= Rebecca Massey =

New Zealand-born Australian actress

- Born: Rotorua, New Zealand
- Education: University of Auckland
- Occupation: Actress
- Years active: 1996–present
- Website: www.rebeccamassey.com.au

Rebecca Massey is a New Zealand-born Australian actress who works in theatre, film and television. Her screen credits include the roles of Beverley Sadler in the ABC comedy Utopia and Lucy Cannon in Chandon Pictures. On stage she has appeared with a number of Australian companies, including Sydney Theatre Company, Belvoir, Bell Shakespeare and Griffin Theatre Company.

== Early life ==
Massey was born in Rotorua, New Zealand. She studied law and English at the University of Auckland and worked briefly as a lawyer before turning to acting.

== Career ==
=== Theatre ===
Massey began her stage career in New Zealand before relocating to Australia, where she appeared in productions with Company B at Belvoir St Theatre from the mid-1990s, including The Alchemist (1996), The Seagull (1997) and the touring production of Tim Winton's Cloudstreet (1998–2001).

In 2018 she played Environment Minister Gwen Malkin in David Finnigan's Kill Climate Deniers at Griffin Theatre Company. In 2024 she appeared in David Finnigan's 44 Sex Acts in One Week, which played at the Canberra Theatre Centre and the Edinburgh Festival Fringe.

=== Film and television ===
Massey played Lucy Cannon in the comedy series Chandon Pictures (2007–2009) and Beverley Sadler in Utopia (2015–2017, 2023). Her other television credits include My Place (2009), Pacific Heat (2016–2017), Metro Sexual (2019–2021) and The Messenger (2023). Her film appearances include Son of the Mask (2005), The Black Balloon (2008), Accidents Happen (2009) and Backyard Ashes (2013).

== Awards and nominations ==
Massey received Helpmann Award nominations for Best Female Actor in a Supporting Role in a Play for The Underpants (2004) and It Just Stopped (2007), and a further Helpmann nomination in the supporting-actress category for Travesties (2010). She has also won a Green Room Award and a Glug Award for her stage work.

Year	Association	Category	Nominated work	Result
2004	Helpmann Award	Best Female Actor in a Supporting Role – Play	The Underpants	Nominated
2007	Helpmann Award	Best Female Actor in a Supporting Role – Play	It Just Stopped	Nominated
2007	Green Room Awards	Best Female Actress	It Just Stopped	Won
2007	Green Room Awards	Best Supporting Female Actress	It Just Stopped	Nominated
2007	Glug Awards	Best Supporting Actress	It Just Stopped	Won
2010	Glug Awards	Best Supporting Actress	Travesties	Nominated
2018	Sydney Theatre Awards	Best New Australian Work	Kill Climate Deniers	Nominated

== Filmography ==
Rebecca Massey's film and television credits include Chandon Pictures (ABC) which won Best Comedy (AFI, ADG, and AWGIES), Best Original Production (ASTRA), Most Outstanding Light Entertainment (Logies), and Utopia (ABC): which won Best Television Comedy Series (AACTA), Most Outstanding Comedy Program (LOGIES).

=== Film ===
Years	Title	Role	Notes
2005	Son of the Mask	Clare	
2006	Final Call		Short film
2008	The Black Balloon	Miss Babb	
2009	Accidents Happen	Louise	
2013	Greg's First Day	Madam 2	Short film
2013	Backyard Ashes	Lilly Waters	
2015	Holding the Man	Woman from Red Cross	
2016	Bad Girl	Detective Daniels	
2018	Last Ark	Captain Shane Hudson	Short film
2022	Blaze	Jade	

=== Television ===
Years	Title	Role	Notes
2002	Kangaroo Creek Gang	Kristie the Koala	Voice
2002	Blood Sports	Sarah	Television film
2002-6	All Saints	Melissa Wilson; Jodie Abbott; Wendy Saralyn	3 episodes
2003	Grass Roots	Kirsten Bovie	Episode: "Youth"
2004	Small Claims	Clare Santarini	Television film
2006	Stepfather of the Bride	Fiona	Television film
2007-9	Chandon Pictures	Lucy Cannon	16 episodes
2009	City Homicide	Peggy Duval	Episode: "Baker's Dozen"
2009	My Place	Mrs Benson	6 episodes
2010-12	Lowdown	Trudy March	4 episodes
2012	Packed to the Rafters	Audrey	2 episodes
2012	Tricky Business	Gaye Hudson	Episode: "Mothercraft"
2015	Winter	Sally McKenzie	Episode: "Blow Up"
2015	The Principal	Rina	4 episodes
2015-17,23	Utopia	Beverley Sadler	11 episodes
2016	Deep Water	Sally Williams	2 episodes
2016-17	Pacific Heat	Maddie Riggs	13 episodes; Voice
2019	Upright	Constable Stacey	Episode: "Day Three"
2019	The Letdown	Real Estate Agent Julie	Episode: "Heavy Heart"
2019-21	Metro Sexual	Miranda Graft	5 episodes
2019	Total Control	Sharon	Episode #1.3
2019	Upright (TV series)	Constable Stacey	1 episode
2022	Barons	Sylive Thompson	3 episodes
2023	The Messenger	Bev Kennedy	6 episodes
2023	While the Men Are Away	Brigadier Birdwood	8 episodes
2023	Erotic Stories	Roz	1 episode
2026	Shakedown	Kathryn Campbell	TV mini series

== Theatre ==
Production	Year	Venue	Company	Role(s)	Director(s)
The Crucible		Mercury Theatre	Mercury Theatre Company	Susanna Walcott	Miles Taylor
The Possibilities			Stronghold Theatre Company	Ensemble	Peter Evans
Daughters of Heaven			Auckland Theatre Company	Pauline Parker	Colin McColl
Evans Freud’s Dora		NZ Arts Council		Dora	Anatoly Frusin
Media Sluts		NZ Puppet Theatre		The Starlet	Peter Evans
Macbeth		Wellington International Festival of the Arts		Lady Macbeth	Peter Evans
The Man from Scotland		New Zealand Fringe Festival			Peter Evans
Steaming		National Tour	Gary Penny Productions	Dawn	Gary Downes
Othello			The Mask Company	Desdemona	Peter Evans
Bad Poetry		NIDA	NIDA Company	Nurse, Sister	Peter Kingston
The Alchemist	1996	Belvoir Street Theatre	Company B Belvoir	Dame Pliant	Neil Armfield
WASP	1996	Belvoir Street Theatre	Company B Belvoir	Zig Zag Woman, Angie, Sis	Neil Armfield
The Seagull	1997	Belvoir Street Theatre	Company B Belvoir	Masha	Neil Armfield
Max & The Trickster		Australian Museum		Trickster	Yaron Lifshitz
Cloudstreet	1998	Sydney Festival, Perth Festival	Company B Belvoir, Black Swan	Elaine, Mrs. Clay, Meredith	Neil Armfield
The Caucasian Chalk Circle	1998	Belvoir Street Theatre	Company B Belvoir	Natella Abashvili	Michael Kantor
Henry IV (Parts I & II)	1999	National Tour	Bell Shakespeare	Lady Percy, Doll Tearsheet Wart	John Bell
Valley of the Big Bones	1999	Australian Museum		Bjork Mcgurk	Warren Coleman
Ship of Fools	1999		Griffin Theatre Company	Sunny, Mayor, Anna Lundsdorf, Madame van Eyck	Ros Horin
Cloudstreet	1999	Melbourne, Adelaide, Zurich Festival, London, Dublin Festival	Company B Belvoir, Black Swan	Elaine, Lucy Wentworth, Meredith	Neil Armfield
The Small Poppies	1999	Sydney Festival	Company B Belvoir	Clint's Mum, Courtney	Neil Armfield
Australian National Playwrights’ Conference	1999				Richard Wherrett, Ros Horin
The Small Poppies	1999	Dublin Festival, Melbourne Festival	Company B Belvoir	Clint's Mum, Courtney	Neil Armfield
Borderlines	2001	The Griffin	Griffin Theatre Company, Riverina Theatre Company	Meredith Danni, Ren, Lisa	Richard Buckham, Adam Cook, Jeremy Sims
Cloudstreet	2001	National Theatre, BAM, Kennedy Centre	Company B Belvoir	Elaine Lamb, Lucy Wentworth, Meredith	Neil Armfield
The Rood Screen	2001	Development Workshop		Alice	Anna Messariti
Macbeth	2003	Belvoir Street Theatre	Company B Belvoir	Witch	Michael Kantor
The Underpants	2003	Belvoir Street Theatre	Company B Belvoir	Gertrude	Neil Armfield
Stuff Happens	2005	Seymour Centre	Company B Belvoir	Various	Neil Armfield
It Just Stopped	2006		Company B Belvoir	Pearl	Neil Armfield
Dead Caesar	2007	Wharf 2 Theater	Sydney Theatre Company	Calpurnia	Tamara Cook
Exit The King	2007	The Merlin, Belvoir Street Theatre	Malthouse Theatre Company, Company B Belvoir	Queen Mary	Neil Armfield
Tartuffe	2008	The Merlin	Malthouse Theatre Company	Dorine	Michael Kantor
Travesties	2009		Sydney Theatre Company	Cecily	Richard Cottrell
The Book of Everything	2013	Tour	Belvoir	Margot	Neil Armfield
Cat on a Hot Tin Roof	2013	Belvoir Street Theatre	Belvoir	Mae	Simon Stone
Vere	2013	Adelaide Festival Centre, Sydney Opera House	State Theatre Company of South Australia, Sydney Theatre Company	Kate	Sarah Goodes
Perplex	2014	Wharf 1	Sydney Theatre Company	Rebecca	Sarah Giles
After Dinner	2015	Wharf 1	Sydney Theatre Company	Dympie	Imara Savage
Chimerica	2017	Roslyn Packer Theatre	Sydney Theatre Company	Barb, Doreen, Marie Dubiecki, Kate, Judy	Kip Williams
Dinner	2017	Sydney Opera House	Sydney Theatre Company	Wynne	Imara Savage
Kill Climate Deniers	2018	The Griffin	Griffin Theatre Company	Gwen Malkin	Lee Lewis
The Misanthrope	2018	Sydney Opera House	Bell Shakespeare	Philipa (Philinte)	Lee Lewis
First Love is the Revolution	2019	The Griffin	Griffin Theatre Company	Cochineal and Bailey Chicken	Lee Lewis
Dance Nation	2020	Adelaide Festival Centre	Belvoir and State Theatre Company of South Australia	Maeve	Imara Savage
The Wayside Bride	2022		Belvoir	Ursula/Rosie/Dusty/Irma	Hannah Goodwin
Light Shining in Buckinghamshire	2022		Belvoir	Cobbe	Eamon Flack
Holding the Man	2024		Belvoir	Louis Caleo	Eamon Flack
44 Sex Acts in One Week	2024		Clubhouse Productions	Malaine Guttierez	Sheridan Harbridge
The Double Life of Marie Curie	2025		The Ensemble Theatre	Hertha Ayrton	Liesel Baddorek
Book of Everything	2026	Belvoir Street Theatre	Belvoir	Margot	Neil Armfield
