= Anne-Louise Sarks =

Australian theatre director, writer and actor

Anne-Louise Sarks is an Australian theatre director, writer, and actor. She has been the artistic director of the Melbourne Theatre Company since October 2021 and its chief executive officer since November, 2025.

== Early life and education ==
Anne-Louise Sarks studied acting at the Victorian College of the Arts.

== Career ==
Sarks began a professional acting career, appearing in plays for Melbourne Theatre Company, Malthouse Theatre, and Belvoir, before beginning to direct. In 2009 she travelled to New York for a summer residency with Anne Bogart at Columbia University and directed her first show for independent theatre company The Hayloft Project, Yuri Wells, co-devised with Benedict Hardie, who starred. The production was shown in both Adelaide and Melbourne, and won awards.

In 2010 she was dramaturg on Simon Stone's production of Thyestes. Also in 2010, she directed her first adaptation of a classic, a recurring feature of her work. The Nest, adapted from Maxim Gorky's The Philistines, was described by The Age as "a subtle, complex manifestation of what ensemble theatre can achieve... Those who thrilled to Hayloft's Thyestes won't be disappointed." In 2013 Sarks co-directed By Their Own Hands, a retelling of the Oedipus myth, with Hardie.

=== Appointments ===
Sarks became the second artistic director of The Hayloft Project in 2010, taking over from Simon Stone, and holding the post until 2013. In 2011 she was also associate artist at Belvoir and director in residence at Malthouse Theatre. In 2013 she was appointed Resident Director at Belvoir.

In 2018, after the success of her production of Seventeen in London, she was appointed artistic director of the Lyric Ensemble at the Lyric Hammersmith.

In April 2021, she was announced as the next artistic director of the Melbourne Theatre Company, making her the first female artistic director of the company since its founding in 1953, with the exception of Robyn Nevin and Pamela Rabe's interim season in 2012.

=== Productions at Melbourne Theatre Company ===
During her time as artistic director at the Melbourne Theatre Company, Sarks has directed the productions Escaped Alone / What If, If Only, Bernhardt/Hamlet by Theresa Rebeck starring Kate Mulvany, and a new musical adaptation of Miles Franklin’s novel My Brilliant Career written by Sheridan Harbridge and Dean Bryant and the Tennessee Williams classic work, A Streetcar Named Desire.

=== Productions at Belvoir ===
In her first year as resident director at Belvoir, Sarks directed an adaptation of Medea, which she co-wrote with Kate Mulvany. The production won five Sydney Theatre Awards, including in the category of Best Mainstage Production. Sarks had also worked, as assistant director and dramaturg, on another show nominated in that category, Thyestes. Sarks was nominated for a Helpmann Award for Best Direction, alongside other nominees Neil Armfield, Lee Lewis, and Rosemary Myers. Sarks and Mulvany won the Australian Writers Guild award for performance writing. The production was also nominated for a Helpmann Award for Best New Australian Work, while the script was nominated for the Nick Enright Prize for Playwriting, within the NSW Premier's Literary Awards, and the Victorian Premier's Prize for Drama.

Sarks has made several shows for Belvoir, including Stories I Want to Tell You in Person, written by Lally Katz, which toured to New York City; an adaptation of A Christmas Carol, co-written with Benedict Hardie; Nora, an adaptation of A Doll's House co-written with Kit Brookman; Elektra/Orestes, co-written with Jada Alberts, a retelling of the Electra myth; Seventeen by Matthew Whittet; Jasper Jones; and in 2018 she directed a new adaptation by Melissa Reeves of An Enemy of the People' which Huw Griffiths, writing in The Conversation, said "fizzes with contemporary relevance".

=== Europe ===
In 2015 Sarks directed Medea for The Gate Theatre, with a British cast. Michael Billington at The Guardian wrote that the production "genuinely makes us see an old play through new eyes", and described seeing the action from the point of view of Medea's children: "The brilliance of the idea is that it offers a wholly plausible picture of the way children react to domestic upheaval with a mixture of alarm and excitement." The Financial Times described it as "Gloriously fresh, and wise far beyond its years", and The Telegraph described it as "powerfully naturalistic", "thick with the tension of anticipation".

In 2017 Sarks directed Seventeen at the Lyric Hammersmith, with a British cast. Michael Billington in The Guardian gave it four stars, and compared it with Dennis Potter's Blue Remembered Hills, writing: "The play wins one over by its sharp understanding of what it is like to be a confused, bewildered teenager."

As artistic director of the Lyric Ensemble at the Lyric Hammersmith, Sarks directed Abandon in 2018. Also in 2018 she directed a Swiss production of Medea for Theater Basel.

In 2019 she directed Avalanche, starring Maxine Peake and adapted for the stage by Julia Leigh from Leigh's book of the same name, at the Barbican Centre.

Her work has also been performed in the United States, Mexico, Poland, New Zealand, Germany, the Netherlands, India, and France.

=== Other Australian work ===
In 2016 Sarks directed A Fiery Maze, a new work written by Tim Finn, based on lyrics by Dorothy Porter, and performed by Finn and Abi Tucker. The show was remounted for the Sydney Festival in 2017.

In 2017 Sarks directed Merchant of Venice for Bell Shakespeare. Writing in The Australian, Chris Boyd argued the work was one of the greatest productions by the company: "By any measure, this is great theatre." She directed Pamela Rabe in the one-woman show The Testament of Mary, by Colm Toibin. The Age praised Rabe for giving a "chiselled, authoritative performance".

In 2018 she directed Blasted for Malthouse Theatre. Alison Croggon wrote that, "It’s hard to think of a better director for this text than Sarks", describing the production as "riveting, real and unreal, like a nightmare". Jana Perkovic, at The Conversation, wrote, "It is the work of a director who has come into her full powers and has nothing left to prove."

== Personal life ==
Sarks's partner is the journalist and political commentator Sean Kelly. They have a son.
