= My Brilliant Career (disambiguation) =

My Brilliant Career is a 1901 novel written by Miles Franklin.

My Brilliant Career may also refer to:

- My Brilliant Career (film), a 1979 film based on the novel
- My Brilliant Career (musical), based on the novel
- My Brilliant Career (TV series), TV series based on the novel
- "My Brilliant Career" (Men Behaving Badly), a 1992 television episode
