= Killernova =

Killernova may refer to:

- A misspelling of Kilonova, an astronomical event
- Killernova, a 2021 collection of poetry by Australian poet Omar Musa
