= Lou Wall =

Australian comedian

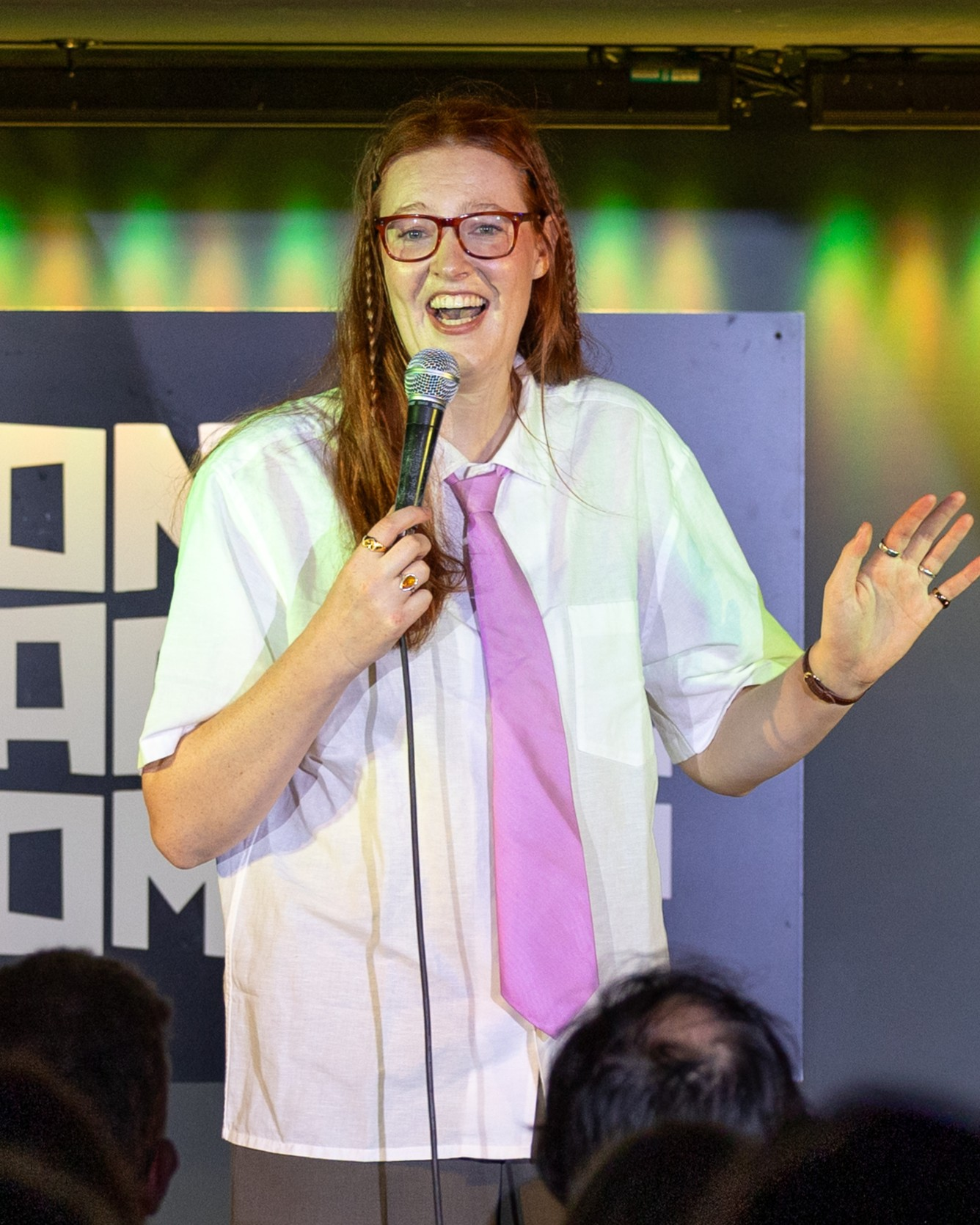
- Lou Wall at the Edinburgh Fringe Festival in 2026.
- Born: Cooma, New South Wales, Australia
- Education: Victorian College of the Arts
- Occupation: Comedian
- Years active: 2016–present

Lou Wall is an Australian comedian known for their multi-media musical comedy. Wall debuted with the solo show, A Dingo Ate My Baby, created for the Victorian College of the Arts's 2016 FRISK festival and later picked up by the Malthouse for the 2017 Melbourne International Comedy Festival.

== Early life ==
Wall grew up in Cooma in New South Wales, Australia. They studied at the Victorian College of the Arts on an acting scholarship.

== Career ==
Wall made their debut with the solo show, A Dingo Ate My Baby, created for the Victorian College of the Arts's 2016 FRISK festival. The show was picked up by the Malthouse for the 2017 Melbourne International Comedy Festival. Wall created their second solo show, It’s Not Me, It’s Lou, as part of the Melbourne Cabaret Festival, and premiered the show at the Melbourne Fringe Festival, where it was nominated for Best Cabaret.

During the COVID-19 pandemic, Wall began incorporating audio-visual elements into their work. Wall joined 84 Facebook groups in attempts to infiltrate Illuminati conspiracy groups, an experience that informed their show, That One Time I Joined The Illuminati, which premiered in 2021. In 2022, their show, Bleep Bloop, which Wall billed as a 'live pop album, premiered.

In 2023, Wall worked as a writer and presenter on WTFAQ on ABC. Their 2023 show, Lou Wall Vs The Internet won a Moosehead Award. Wall's The Bisexual’s Lament was shortlisted for the 2023 Melbourne International Comedy Festival Award and won Best of the Fest at the Sydney Comedy Festival. They co-created Flat Earthers: The Musical with Jean Tong. The comedic musical had its premiere as a co-production with Hayes Theatre Co. and Griffin Theatre Company, Sydney in 2024. Their 2025 show, Breaking the Fifth Wall was directed by Zoë Coombs Marr and nominated for the 2025 Melbourne International Comedy Festival Award for Most Outstanding Show.

== Personal life ==
Wall identifies as queer and non-binary. They were in a relationship with playwright Jean Tong.
