= Boris Ivanoff =

Australian filmmaker, screenwriter and theatre director

Boris Ivanoff is an Australian filmmaker, screenwriter and theatre director based in Sydney, New South Wales. His work includes short films, documentary filmmaking and stage productions, including the war drama Mountain Fire (2021) and The Second Casualty, a feature-length film project.

== Career ==
=== Film ===
Ivanoff's filmmaking career includes short films, documentary work and feature-length drama. His early productions included Midnight Patsy (2002), the short documentary The Second Oldest Profession (2009), Children of Y (2012) and War is Beautiful (2014), which he wrote and directed.

In 2011, Ivanoff received an art department credit on Up the Aisle.

In 2021, Ivanoff wrote and directed the 38-minute dramatic short film Mountain Fire, starring Joseph Del Re, Michael Rebetzke and Sheridan Harbridge. The film follows a photojournalist who survives an improvised explosive device explosion in a war zone and must confront the consequences of betraying a soldier who saved his life.

Mountain Fire was acquired for distribution at the prestigious Clermont-Ferrand and subsequently distributed internationally by Gonella Productions.

Ivanoff subsequently wrote, directed and produced The Second Casualty, a 90-minute Australian war drama starring Joseph Del Re, Michael Rebetzke and Sheridan Harbridge. The film follows a photojournalist stranded in the mountains of Afghanistan who rediscovers his professional purpose while fulfilling a promise to a soldier who saved his life.

Ivanoff also co-edited the film with Adam Eden, with cinematography by Ben Brunnekreef. IMDb lists the production as a 2025 film.

=== Theatre ===
Ivanoff has worked as a theatre director and writer in Sydney, directing productions at the Seymour Centre, Newtown Theatre and New Theatre.

In 1999, he directed and co-wrote Eternity Lounge: The Film Noir Musical at the Seymour Centre. The musical was developed from a story by Ivanoff based on an idea by Xanon Murphy.

In January 2007, Ivanoff directed playwright Venetia Taylor's Hillary Hillary Hillary! at Newtown Theatre as part of Sydney's Short+Sweet festival. AusStage records the production as part of the festival's Wildcards programme, presented by Rag and Bone Productions.

In February 2008, Ivanoff directed Taylor's satirical play Terror on the Northside for Rag and Bone Productions at Newtown Theatre, before its presentation at the Short+Sweet festival finals at the Seymour Centre. The production examined cultural prejudice through a young woman's introduction of her Muslim boyfriend to her parents.

Writing in StageNoise, actor and festival judge Denise Roberts praised Ivanoff's direction of Terror on the Northside, identifying it as the strongest production of the finals. The play received four awards, including Best Overall Production, Best Actress, Best Script and Best New Talent, the latter recognising playwright Venetia Taylor.

The production was also featured in the televised Short & Sweet competition in 2008. The final episode, presented by Jo Stanley, featured judges Georgie Parker, Mark Morrissey and Spencer McLaren, who evaluated the performances and script. The production was declared the winner of the televised series.

The programme is preserved by the National Film and Sound Archive of Australia, which identifies Ivanoff as director and Venetia Taylor as playwright. The production was declared the winner of the televised Short & Sweet competition in 2008.

Later in 2008, Ivanoff directed Jessica Bellamy's Living Breathing Loving as part of New Theatre's Brand Spanking New programme. The production starred Tom Oakley and Matilda Ridgway.

Ivanoff directed Venetia Taylor's Terror on the Northside, which won Best Overall Production at the 2008 Sydney Short+Sweet festival. The production received critical praise in StageNoise and was also the winning production in a televised Short & Sweet competition, documented by the National Film and Sound Archive of Australia.

== Filmography ==
Year	Title	Role	Format
2002	Midnight Patsy	Writer, director	Short film
2009	The Second Oldest Profession	Director	Short documentary
2011	Up the Aisle	Art department	Film
2012	Children of Y	Writer, director	Short film
2014	War is Beautiful	Writer, director	Short film
2021	Mountain Fire	Writer, director, producer, editor	Short film
2025	The Second Casualty	Writer, director, producer, co-editor	Feature film

== Awards and recognition ==
Year	Award	Production	Result
2008	Short+Sweet – Best Overall Production	Terror on the Northside	Won
2008	Short+Sweet – Best Script	Terror on the Northside	Won
2008	Short+Sweet – Best Actress	Terror on the Northside	Won
2008	Short+Sweet – Best New Talent	Venetia Taylor, Terror on the Northside	Won

The awards were received by Terror on the Northside and members of its creative team, rather than being individual directing awards for Ivanoff.
