= Tamsin Carroll =

Australian actress (born 1979)

Tamsin Georgina Carroll
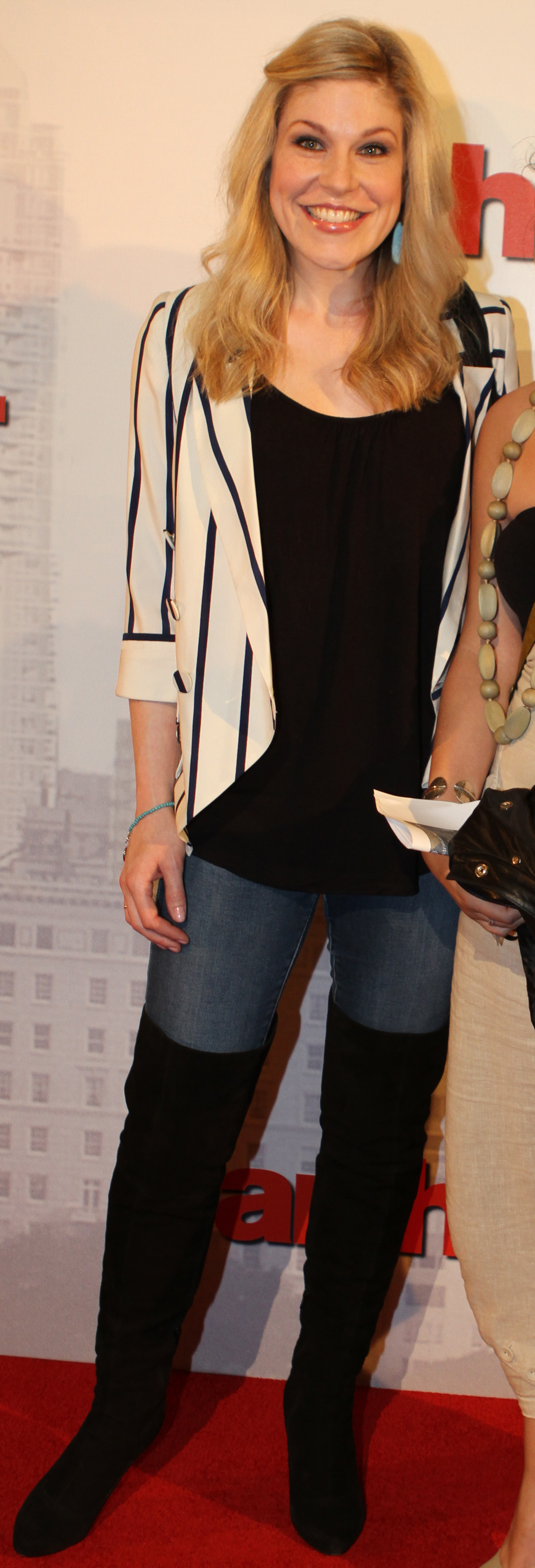
- Tamsin Carroll in April 2011
- Born: 13 February 1979 (age 47); Sydney, Australia
- Occupation: Actress
- Children: 1
- Parent: Peter Carroll

Tamsin Georgina Carroll (born 13 February 1979) is an Australian actress. She is best known for her performances in musical theatre in Australia and the United Kingdom.

== Early life ==
Carroll was born and raised in Sydney. Her parents are Australian actor Peter Carroll and Trisha, a former historian and archivist for the Sydney Theatre Company.

== Career ==
At the age of four, Carroll was an extra in the television western series Five Mile Creek which featured her father, as well as Nicole Kidman in an early role.

Carroll became a member of the Actors Equity of Australia at the age of five, and made her professional debut two years later in a Sydney Theatre Company production of Six Characters in Search of an Author in 1987. Her early adult roles included Little Red Riding Hood in Into the Woods opposite her father as the Narrator/Mysterious Man (Melbourne Theatre Company) and Vicki in Long Gone Lonesome Cowgirls (Railway Street Theatre, Penrith). Carroll first received wide notice as Marianne Renate in the Australian tour of the Johnny O'Keefe jukebox musical Shout! The Legend of the Wild One (Kevin Jacobsen Productions) which opened in Melbourne in 2000.

Subsequent roles as Nancy in Oliver! (IMG / Cameron Mackintosh, Australian tour and Singapore) and Dusty Springfield in Dusty - The Original Pop Diva (Dusty Productions, Australian tour) won Carroll multiple awards.

Other leading roles in Australian theatre and musical theatre include Marta in Company (Kookaburra), Isabella in Measure for Measure (Bell Shakespeare), Rizzo in Grease – The Arena Spectacular (SEL/GFO), Tracy Lord in High Society, Rose in Bye Bye Birdie and Sheila in Hair (The Production Company), Vixen in The Threepenny Opera (Belvoir Street Theatre Bogata Festival), Allie in Harbour and Olivia in The Republic of Myopia (Sydney Theatre Company).

Carroll got her break in London when Cameron Mackintosh toured Oliver! to the West End in 2008. This saw her relocate to the UK permanently in 2012. Her British theatre credits include Emma Goldman in Ragtime and Titania in A Midsummer Night's Dream (Open Air Theatre, Regent's Park), alternate Nancy in Oliver! (Theatre Royal Drury Lane) and Ensemble in The Magistrate (Royal National Theatre). She played the role of Ellen in the West End revival of Miss Saigon and Baroness Bomburst in the UK tour of Chitty Chitty Bang Bang.

In 2017 she appeared in the new musical Everybody's Talking About Jamie at the Crucible Theatre, Sheffield. She subsequently reprised the role when the show transferred to London's West End, playing at the Apollo Theatre from 6 November 2017.

Carroll's television credits include EastEnders, Goddess and Carols by Candlelight. She also starred in the 1999 feature film Holy Smoke! opposite Kate Winslet.

In 2023, Carroll returned to Australia to perform alongside her father in Belvoir Theatre Company’s production of Into the Woods, which they had also previously performed in together with the Melbourne Theatre Company in 1998. They have also collaborated on the stage shows Harbour and The Republic of Myopia for the Sydney Theatre Company, and the 1988 miniseries Melba starring Hugo Weaving.

Carroll returned to the UK in July 2023, to perform in Chichester Festival Theatre's new musical Rock Follies.

== Personal life ==
Carroll met her British husband, Chris, while performing in the West End revival of Oliver!. Together they have a son.

== Filmography ==
=== Film ===
| Year | Title | Role | Type |
|---|---|---|---|
| 1999 | Holy Smoke! | Jodie | Feature film |
| 2000 | The Three Stooges | Brunette | TV film |
| 2013 | Goddess | Deb | Feature film |

=== Television ===
| Year | Title | Role | Type |
|---|---|---|---|
| | Five Mile Creek | Extra | Miniseries |
| 1988 | Melba | Dora Mitchell | Miniseries, 2 episodes |
| 1994 | Heartbreak High | Bonnie | 2 episodes |
| 1998 | A Difficult Woman | Female student | 3 episodes |
| 2000 | Above the Law | Narelle Reilly | 1 episode |
| 2000–2008 | All Saints | Nikki Collins / Tanya Foster-Wallace | 2 episodes |
| 2014 | EastEnders | Nicole | 3 episodes |

== Theatre ==
| Year | Title | Role | Type |
|---|---|---|---|
| 1988 | Six Characters in Search of an Author | | Sydney Opera House with STC for Festival Theatre Company |
| 1989 | Evita | Child | State Theatre, Sydney with Stetson Productions |
| 1998 | Into the Woods | Little Red Riding Hood | Playhouse, Melbourne with MTC |
| 1998 | A Little Night Music | Ann / Fredrika Armfeidt (understudy) | Theatre Royal, Sydney with MTC |
| 1999 | The Listmaker | Corrie / Piriel | Bell Shakespeare |
| 2000 | Long Gone Lonesome Cowgirls | Vicki | Q Theatre, Penrith |
| 2000 | Shout! The Legend of the Wild One | Marianne Renate | State Theatre, Melbourne, Capitol Theatre, Sydney, Lyric Theatre, Brisbane with Kevin Jacobsen Productions |
| 2002 | Into the Woods | The Baker's Wife | Regent Theatre, Melbourne (one night only) |
| 2002 | Helpmann Awards 2002 | Actor / Singer | Star City Showroom |
| 2002-03 | Oliver! | Nancy | Lyric Theatre Sydney, Regent Theatre, Melbourne & Singapore tour with IMG / Cameron Mackintosh |
| 2003 | Bye Bye Birdie | Rose | State Theatre, Melbourne with The Production Company |
| 2003 | Hair | Sheila | Her Majesty's Theatre, Melbourne with The Production Company |
| 2003 | Sideshow Alley | Rita | Chapel Off Chapel with The Production Company |
| 2004 | Harbour | Allie | STC |
| 2004 | Dusty Springfield Musical Workshop | Dusty Springfield | Dusty Productions |
| 2004 | The Threepenny Opera | Vixen | Belvoir, Sydney for Bogota Theatre Festival |
| 2004 | Take Flight | Amelia Earhart | Adelaide Cabaret Festival |
| 2004 | The Republic of Myopia | Olivia | STC |
| 2004 | High Society | Tracy Lord | State Theatre, Melbourne with The Production Company |
| 2005 | Grease – The Arena Spectacular | Rizzo | Sydney Entertainment Centre, Melbourne Park with SEL / GFO |
| 2005 | Measure for Measure | Isabella | Playhouse, Melbourne, Playhouse, Brisbane, Newcastle Civic Theatre, Sydney Opera House, Playhouse, Canberra, Orange Civic Theatre with Bell Shakespeare |
| 2005 | Carols by Candlelight | Singer | Sidney Myer Music Bowl |
| 2005–2006 | Dusty - The Original Pop Diva | Dusty Springfield | State Theatre, Melbourne, Lyric Theatre Sydney, Burswood Theatre, Perth, Festival Theatre, Adelaide, Lyric Theatre, Brisbane with Dusty Productions |
| 2007 | Company | Marta | Theatre Royal, Sydney with Kookaburra Musical Theatre |
| 2007 | ALP Arts Election Launch | Actor | Riverside Theatres, Parramatta |
| 2007 | The Spirit of Christmas | Performer | Concert Hall, Brisbane |
| 2008–2009 | The Rocky Horror Show | Magenta / Usherette | Star Theatre, Sydney, Comedy Theatre, Melbourne with New Theatricals |
| 2009 | Oliver! | Nancy | Theatre Royal Drury Lane, London |
| 2012 | Ragtime | Emma Goldman | Open Air Theatre, Regent's Park, London |
| 2012 | A Midsummer Night's Dream | Titania | Open Air Theatre, Regent's Park, London |
| 2012–2013 | The Magistrate | Singing Dandy / Agatha (understudy) | Royal National Theatre, London, Phoenix Cinema, Oxford |
| 2013 | Barnum | Charity 'Chairy' Barnum | Chichester Festival Theatre |
| 2014 | Miss Saigon | Ellen | Prince Edward Theatre, London |
| 2015 | Casa Valentina | Rita | Southwark Playhouse, London with Amy Anzel Productions |
| 2015 | Chitty Chitty Bang Bang | Baroness Bomburst | West Yorkshire Playhouse |
| 2016–2017 | Strictly Ballrooom | Shirley | London & Toronto seasons with Global Creatures |
| 2017–2020 | Everybody's Talking About Jamie | Miss Hedge | Crucible Theatre Sheffield, Apollo Theatre West End, London |
| 2018 | Twelfth Night | Maria | Southbank Theatre, Melbourne |
| 2019 | Peter Gynt | Woman in Green / Anitra | Olivier Theatre at The National |
| 2021–2023 | Hex | Queenie | National Theatre, London |
| 2022 | 2:22 A Ghost Story | Lauren | Criterion Theatre, West End |
| 2023 | Into the Woods | Witch | Belvoir, Sydney |
| 2023 | Rock Follies | Gloria / Kitty | Chichester Festival Theatre |
| 2024 | Zombie! | Carol | Hayes Theatre Co, Sydney |
| 2024 | August: Osage County | Barbara Fordham | Belvoir, Sydney |

== Awards ==
| Year | Nominated work | Award | Result |
|---|---|---|---|
| 2002 | Tamsin Carroll | Mo Award for Female Musical Theatre Performer of the Year | Won |
| 2002 | Oliver! | Green Room Award for Best Female Actor in a Leading Role (Music Theatre) | Won |
| 2003 | Oliver! | Helpmann Award for Best Female Actor in a Musical | Won |
| 2006 | Dusty – The Original Pop Diva | Helpmann Award for Best Female Actor in a Musical | Won |
| 2006 | Dusty – The Original Pop Diva | Green Room Award for Best Female Actor in a Leading Role (Music Theatre) | Won |
| 2024 | August: Osage County | Sydney Theatre Awards for Best Performance in a Leading Role in a Mainstage Production | Won |
| 2024 | Zombie! The Musical | Sydney Theatre Awards for Best Performance in a Supporting Role in a Musical | Nominated |
