= Sydney Theatre Awards =

Australian theatre awards

The Sydney Theatre Awards are annual awards to recognise the strength, quality and diversity of professional theatre in Sydney, Australia. They were established in 2005 by a group of major Sydney theatre critics. The awards recognise mainstage and independent plays and musicals.

== Selected award recipients ==
=== 2025 ===
The 2025 awards were announced on 19 January 2026.

- Best Mainstage Production: Grief is the Thing with Feathers (Belvoir and Andrew Henry Presents)
- Best Independent Production: Sistren (Green Door Theatre Company in association with Griffin Theatre Company)
- Best Direction of a Mainstage Production: Damien Ryan (The Player Kings)
- Best Direction of an Independent Production: Ian Michael (Sistren)
- Best Performance in a Leading Role in a Mainstage Production: Kat Stewart (Who’s Afraid of Virginia Woolf?)
- Best Performance in a Leading Role in an Independent Production: Fraser Morrison (Cruise)
- Best Performance in a Supporting Role in a Mainstage Production: Angela Mahlatjie (Primary Trust)
- Best Performance in a Supporting Role in an Independent Production: Deborah Galanos (Saints of Damour)
- Best Stage Design of a Mainstage Production: Nick Schlieper and Simon Phillips with Craig Wilkinson and Jon Weber (Grief is the Thing with Feathers)
- Best Stage Design of an Independent Production: Hannah Tayler and Paris Bell (Lost & Finding)
- Best Costume Design of a Mainstage Production: Ella Butler and Hailley Hunt (Orlando)
- Best Costume Design of an Independent Production: Emelia Simcox (Cowbois)
- Best Lighting Design of a Mainstage Production: Nick Schlieper (Grief is the Thing with Feathers)
- Best Lighting Design of an Independent Production: Ryan McDonald (Furious Mattress)
- Best Sound Design of a Mainstage Production: Freya Schack-Arnott and Daniel Herten (Grief is the Thing with Feathers
- Best Sound Design and Composition of an Independent Production: Tom Hogan (Birdsong of Tomorrow)
- Best New Australian Work: Grief is the Thing with Feathers (Simon Phillips, Nick Schlieper & Toby Schmitz)
- Best Newcomer: Danny Howard (Jacky / Whitefella Yella Tree) and Iolanthe (Sistren / The Edit)
- Best Ensemble: The Player Kings (Sport for Jove in association with Seymour Centre)
- Best Production of a Musical: Phar Lap: The Electro-Swing Musical (Hayes Theatre)
- Best Direction of a Musical: Sheridan Harbridge (Phar Lap: The Electro-Swing Musical)
- Best Performance in a Leading Role in a Musical: Joel Granger (Phar Lap: The Electro-Swing Musical)
- Best Performance in a Supporting Role in a Musical: Elenoa Rokobaro (Hadestown)
- Best Musical Direction of a Musical: Guy Simpson (Guys & Dolls)
- Best Choreography of a Musical: Kelley Abbey (Guys & Dolls)
- Best Design of a Musical: Dann Barber (Set and Costume Design, Candide)
- Best Production for Children: Wolfgang in the Stars (Circa and Riverside Theatres)
- Best Production for Young People: Converted (ATYP)
- Lifetime Achievement Award: Elizabeth Butcher AM

=== 2024 ===
The 2024 awards were announced on 20 January 2025.

- Best Mainstage Production: August: Osage County (Belvoir)
- Best Independent Production: The Inheritance (Shane Anthony, Daniel Cottier Productions, Sugary Rum Productions and Seymour Centre)
- Best Direction of a Mainstage Production: Eamon Flack (August: Osage County)
- Best Direction of an Independent Production: Shane Anthony (The Inheritance)
- Best Performance in a Leading Role in a Mainstage Production: Tamsin Carroll (August: Osage County) and Pamela Rabe (August: Osage County)
- Best Performance in a Leading Role in an Independent Production: André de Vanny (The Lonesome West)
- Best Performance in a Supporting Role in a Mainstage Production: Ursula Yovich (The Lewis Trilogy)
- Best Performance in a Supporting Role in an Independent Production: Lilian Alejandra Valverde (Snowflake)
- Best Stage Design of a Mainstage Production: Renée Mulder (Stolen)
- Best Stage Design of an Independent Production: Kate Beere (Arlington)
- Best Costume Design of a Mainstage Production: Renée Mulder (Stolen)
- Best Costume Design of an Independent Production: Dann Barber (Yentl)
- Best Lighting Design of a Mainstage Production: Trent Suidgeest (Stolen)
- Best Lighting Design of an Independent Production: Aron Murray (Arlington)
- Best Sound Design and Composition of a Mainstage Production: James Brown (Stolen)
- Best Sound Design and Composition of an Independent Production: Johnny Yang (Ruins)
- Best New Australian Work: Trophy Boys (Emmanuelle Mattana)
- Best Newcomer: Daniel R. Nixon (The Curious Incident of the Dog in the Night-Time)
- Best Ensemble: The Inheritance (Shane Anthony, Daniel Cottier Productions, Sugary Rum Productions and Seymour Centre)
- Best Production of a Musical: Zombie! The Musical (Hayes Theatre)
- Best Direction of a Musical: Darren Yap (Zombie! The Musical)
- Best Performance in a Leading Role in a Musical: Michael Paynter (Jesus Christ Superstar)
- Best Performance in a Supporting Role in a Musical: Stephen Anderson (Titanique)
- Best Musical Direction: Laura Tipoki (Jesus Christ Superstar)
- Best Choreography in a Musical: Chiara Assetta (Zombie! The Musical)
- Best Production for Children: Cicada (Barking Gecko Theatre and Sydney Theatre Company)
- Best Production for Young People: Saplings (Australian Theatre for Young People and Youth Action)
- Lifetime Achievement Award: Jim Sharman

=== 2023 ===
The 2023 awards were announced on 29 January 2024.

- Best Mainstage Production: The Visitors (Sydney Theatre Company and Moogahlin Performing Arts)
- Best Independent Production: A Streetcar Named Desire (Red Line Productions)
- Best Direction of a Mainstage Production: Shari Sebbens (Fences)
- Best Direction of an Independent Production: Alexander Berlage (A Streetcar Named Desire)
- Best Performance in a Leading Role in a Mainstage Production: Catherine Văn-Davies (Constellations)
- Best Performance in a Leading Role in an Independent Production: Sheridan Harbridge (A Streetcar Named Desire)
- Best Performance in a Supporting Role in a Mainstage Production: Andrew McFarlane (Hubris & Humiliation)
- Best Performance in a Supporting Role in an Independent Production: Catherine Văn-Davies (A Streetcar Named Desire)
- Best Stage Design of a Mainstage Production: Isabel Hudson (Constellations)
- Best Stage Design of an Independent Production: Nick Fry (Metropolis)
- Best Costume Design of a Mainstage Production: Isabel Hudson (Hubris & Humiliation)
- Best Costume Design of an Independent Production: Grace Deacon (An ox stand on my tongue)
- Best Lighting Design of a Mainstage Production: Benjamin Brockman (Constellations)
- Best Lighting Design of an Independent Production: Morgan Moroney (Collapsible)
- Best Sound Design of a Mainstage Production: James Brown (Constellations)
- Best Original Score of a Mainstage Production: Grace Ferguson (On the Beach)
- Best Sound Design and Composition of an Independent Production: Zara Stanton (Metropolis)
- Best New Australian Work: Lewis Treston (Hubris & Humiliation)
- Best Newcomer: Abigail Adriano (Miss Saigon)
- Best Ensemble: The Visitors (Sydney Theatre Company and Moogahlin Performing Arts)
- Best Production of a Musical: A Little Night Music (Hayes Theatre)
- Best Direction of a Musical: Dean Bryant (A Little Night Music)
- Best Performance in a Leading Role in a Musical: Ruva Ngwenya (Tina The Tina Turner Musical)
- Best Performance in a Supporting Role in a Musical: Nancye Hayes (A Little Night Music)
- Best Musical Direction: Zara Stanton (Metropolis)
- Best Choreography in a Musical: Vi Lam (The 25th Annual Putnam County Spelling Bee)
- Best Production for Children: Waru (Bangarra Dance Theatre and Sydney Festival)
- Best Production for Young People: The Lies We Were Told (Shopfront Arts and Monkey Baa)
- Lifetime Achievement Award: Jane Seldon and Terence Clarke

=== 2022 ===
The 2022 awards were announced on 23 January 2023.

- Best Mainstage Production: The Jungle and the Sea (Belvoir)
- Best Independent Production: Albion (Secret House, New Ghosts Theatre Company and Seymour Centre)
- Best Direction of a Mainstage Production: Kip Williams (Strange Case of Dr Jekyll and Mr Hyde)
- Best Direction of an Independent Production: Lucy Clements (Albion)
- Best Performance in a Leading Role in a Mainstage Production: Heather Mitchell (RBG: Of Many, One)
- Best Performance in a Leading Role in an Independent Production: Jane Phegan (The End of Winter)
- Best Performance in a Supporting Role in a Mainstage Production: Peter Carroll (The Tempest)
- Best Performance in a Supporting Role in an Independent Production: Merridy Eastman (Hand of God)
- Best Stage Design of a Mainstage Production: Mel Page (A Raisin in the Sun)
- Best Stage Design of an Independent Production: Grace Deacon and Kelsey Lee (Destroy, She Said)
- Best Costume Design of a Mainstage Production: Romance Was Born and Anna Cordingley (Amadeus)
- Best Costume Design of an Independent Production: Esther Zhong (Moon Rabbit Rising)
- Best Lighting Design of a Mainstage Production: Nick Schlieper (Strange Case of Dr Jekyll and Mr Hyde)
- Best Lighting Design of an Independent Production: Tyler Fitzpatrick (Moon Rabbit Rising)
- Best Sound Design of a Mainstage Production: Michael Toisuta (Strange Case of Dr Jekyll and Mr Hyde)
- Best Original Score of a Mainstage Production: Arjunan Puveendran (The Jungle and the Sea)
- Best Sound Design and Composition of an Independent Production: Christine Pan (Moon Rabbit Rising)
- Best New Australian Work: The Jungle and the Sea (S. Shakthidharan and Eamon Flack)
- Best Newcomer: Masego Pitso (Chewing Gum Dreams)
- Best Ensemble: The Jungle and the Sea (Belvoir)
- Best Production of a Musical: Moulin Rouge! The Musical (Global Creatures)
- Best Direction of a Musical: Cameron Mitchell (Nice Work If You Can Get It)
- Best Performance in a Leading Role in a Musical: Stefanie Jones (Mary Poppins)
- Best Performance in a Supporting Role in a Musical: Simon Burke (Moulin Rouge! The Musical)
- Best Musical Direction: Chris King, Steven Kramer and Nigel Ubrihien (Jekyll and Hyde)
- Best Choreography in a Musical: Cameron Mitchell (Nice Work If You Can Get It)
- Best Production for Children: Yong (Monkey Baa Theatre)
- Best Production for Young People: The Deb (ATYP)
- Lifetime Achievement Award: John Robertson and William Yang

=== 2021 ===
The 2021 awards were announced on 31 January 2022.

- Best Mainstage Production: The Picture of Dorian Gray (Sydney Theatre Company)
- Best Independent Production: Symphonie Fantastique (Little Eggs Collective in association with KXT)
- Best Direction of a Mainstage Production: Kip Williams (The Picture of Dorian Gray)
- Best Direction of an Independent Production: Tasnim Hossain (Yellow Face)
- Best Performance in a Leading Role in a Mainstage Production: Eryn Jean Norvill (The Picture of Dorian Gray)
- Best Performance in a Leading Role in an Independent Production: Shan-Ree Tan (Yellow Face)
- Best Performance in a Supporting Role in a Mainstage Production: Aaron Tsindos (No Pay? No Way!)
- Best Performance in a Supporting Role in an Independent Production: Alfie Gledhill (The Removalists)
- Best Stage Design of a Mainstage Production: Marg Horwell and David Bergman (The Picture of Dorian Gray)
- Best Stage Design of an Independent Production: Charles Davis (Happy Days)
- Best Costume Design of a Mainstage Production: Genevieve Blanchett (Home, I’m Darling)
- Best Costume Design of an Independent Production: Esther Zhong (Three Fat Virgins Unassembled)
- Best Lighting Design of a Mainstage Production: Matt Scott (Fun Home)
- Best Lighting Design of an Independent Production: Benjamin Brockman (Symphonie Fantastique)
- Best Sound Design of a Mainstage Production: David Bergman (Green Park)
- Best Sound Design and Composition of an Independent Production: Oliver Shermacher (Symphonie Fantastique)
- Best New Australian Work: The Visitors (Jane Harrison)
- Best Newcomer: Kiana Daniele (SIX)
- Best Ensemble: Symphonie Fantastique
- Best Production of a Musical: Hamilton (Jeffrey Seller, Sander Jacobs, Jill Furman, The Public Theater and Michael Cassel)
- Best Direction of a Musical: Dean Bryant (Fun Home)
- Best Performance in a Leading Role in a Musical: Lyndon Watts (Hamilton)
- Best Performance in a Supporting Role in a Musical: Marty Alix (Hamilton)
- Best Musical Direction: Carmel Dean (Fun Home)
- Best Cabaret Production: Is This All Then? (Philip Quast)
- Best Production for Children: Wilfrid Gordon McDonald Partridge (Sydney Opera House and Australian Chamber Orchestra)
- Best Production for Young People: I've Been Meaning to Ask You (The Good Room, Critical Stages Touring, ATYP and Riverside Theatres)
- Lifetime Achievement Award: Gale Edwards and Tony Sheldon

=== 2019 ===
The 2019 awards were announced on 20 January 2020.

- Best Mainstage Production: Counting and Cracking (Belvoir and Co-Curious)
- Best Independent Production: John (Outhouse Theatre Co and Seymour Centre)
- Best Direction of a Mainstage Production: Paige Rattray (The Beauty Queen of Leenane)
- Best Direction of an Independent Production: Dino Dimitriadis (Angels in America)
- Best Female Actor in a Leading Role in a Mainstage Production: Sheridan Harbridge (Prima Facie)
- Best Male Actor in a Leading Role in a Mainstage Production: Meyne Wyatt (City of Gold)
- Best Female Actor in a Leading Role in an Independent Production: Janine Watson (The Happy Prince)
- Best Male Actor in a Leading Role in an Independent Production: Justin Amankwah (Good Dog)
- Best Female Actor in a Supporting Role in a Mainstage Production: Shari Sebbens (City of Gold)
- Best Male Actor in a Supporting Role in a Mainstage Production: Hamish Michael (The Beauty Queen of Leenane)
- Best Female Actor in a Supporting Role in an Independent Production: Catherine Văn-Davies (Angels in America)
- Best Male Actor in a Supporting Role in an Independent Production: Joseph Althouse (Angels in America)
- Best Sound Design and Composition of an Independent Production:
- Best Independent Musical: American Psycho (BB Arts Entertainment and Two Doors Productions)
- Best New Australian Work: Counting and Cracking (S. Shakthidharan)
- Best Production of a Mainstage Musical: Fangirls (Belvoir, Queensland Theatre and Brisbane Festival in association with ATYP)
- Lifetime Achievement Award: Maggie Blinco

=== 2018 ===
The 2018 awards were announced on 21 January 2019.

- Best Mainstage Production: The Harp in the South (Sydney Theatre Company)
- Best Direction of a Mainstage Production: Kip Williams (The Harp in the South)
- Best Female Actor in a Leading Role in a Mainstage Production: Claire Lovering (The Feather in the Web)
- Best Male Actor in a Leading Role in a Mainstage Production: Hugo Weaving (The Resistible Rise of Arturo Ui)
- Best Independent Production: Stupid Fucking Bird (New Theatre)
- Best New Australian Work: The Harp in the South (Kate Mulvany)
- Best Production of a Musical: Cry-Baby (LPD in association with Hayes Theatre)
- Best Cabaret Production: Since Ali Died (Omar Musa), directed by Anthea Williams
- Lifetime Achievement Award: Robert Love, director, Riverside Theatres Parramatta

=== 2017 ===
The 2017 awards were announced on 22 January 2018.

- Best Mainstage Production: Hir (Belvoir)
- Best Direction of a Mainstage Production: Anthea Williams (Hir)
- Best Female Actor in a Leading Role in a Mainstage Production: Kate Mulvany (Richard 3)
- Best Male Actor in a Leading Role in a Mainstage Production: Mitchell Butel (The Merchant of Venice)
- Best Independent Production: A View From the Bridge (Red Line Productions)
- Best New Australian Work: Shit (Patricia Cornelius)
- Best Production of a Mainstream Musical: Muriel’s Wedding The Musical (Sydney Theatre Company and Global Creatures)
- Best Production of an Independent Musical: Calamity Jane (One Eyed Man Productions in association with Neglected Musicals and Hayes Theatre)
- Lifetime Achievement Award: Brian Thomson

=== 2016 ===
The 2016 awards were announced at the Seymour Centre on 23 January 2017. Recipients included:

- Best Mainstage Production: The Drover’s Wife (Belvoir)
- Best Direction of a Mainstage Production: Leticia Caceres (The Drover’s Wife)
- Best Female Actor in a Leading Role in a Mainstage Production: Marta Dusseldorp (Gloria)
- Best Male Actor in a Leading Role in a Mainstage Production: Colin Friels (Faith Healer)
- Best Independent Production: Antigone (Sport for Jove)
- Best New Australian Work: Leah Purcell (The Drover’s Wife)
- Best Production of a Musical: Little Shop of Horrors (Luckiest Productions and Tinderbox Productions in association with Hayes Theatre)
- Lifetime Achievement Award: Judi Farr

=== 2015 ===
The 2015 awards were announced at the Paddington RSL on 18 January 2016. Recipients included:

- Best Mainstage Production: Ivanov (Belvoir)
- Best Direction of a Mainstage Production: Eamon Flack (Ivanov)
- Best Actress in a Leading Role in a Mainstage Production: Eryn Jean Norvill (Suddenly Last Summer)
- Best Actor in a Leading Role in a Mainstage Production: Hugo Weaving (Endgame)
- Best Independent Production: Of Mice and Men (Sport for Jove and Seymour Centre)
- Best New Australian Work: The Bleeding Tree (Angus Cerini)
- Best Production of a Musical: Matilda (The Royal Shakespeare Company, Louise Withers, Michael Coppel and Michael Watt)
- Lifetime Achievement Award: Christine Dunstan

=== 2014 ===
- Best Mainstage Production: Henry V (Bell Shakespeare)
- Best Direction of a Mainstage Production: Damien Ryan (Henry V)
- Best Actress in a Leading Role in a Mainstage Production: Sarah Peirse (Switzerland)
- Best Actor in a Leading Role in a Mainstage Production: Richard Roxburgh (Cyrano de Bergerac)
- Best Independent Production: All's Well That Ends Well (Sport for Jove)
- Best New Australian Work: Switzerland (Joanna Murray-Smith)
- Best Production of a Musical: Sweet Charity (Luckiest Productions and Gooding Productions in association with Hayes Theatre)
- Lifetime Achievement Award: Reg Livermore

=== 2013 ===
- Best Mainstage Production: Waiting for Godot (Sydney Theatre Company)
- Best Direction of a Mainstage Production: Sam Strong (The Floating World)
- Best Actress in a Leading Role in a Mainstage Production: Harriet Dyer (Machinal)
- Best Actor in a Leading Role in a Mainstage Production: Peter Kowitz (The Floating World)
- Best Independent Production: Cyrano de Bergerac (Sport for Jove)
- Best New Australian Work: Andrew Bovell (The Secret River)
- Best Production of a Musical: Dirty Rotten Scoundrels
- Lifetime Achievement Award: John Romeril

=== 2012 ===
- Best Mainstage Production: Medea (Belvoir in association with Australian Theatre for Young People)
- Best Direction of a Mainstage Production: Anne-Louise Sarks (Medea)
- Best Actress in a Leading Role in a Mainstage Production: Blazey Best (Medea)
- Best Actor in a Leading Role in a Mainstage Production: Josh McConville (The Boys)
- Best Independent Production: Punk Rock (pantsguys Productions with atyp Under The Wharf)
- Best New Australian Work: Medea (Kate Mulvany and Anne-Louise Sarks after Euripides)
- Best Production of a Musical: South Pacific
- Lifetime Achievement Award: Barry Humphries

=== 2011 ===
The 2011 Sydney Theatre Awards were announced in Paddington on 15 January 2012.

- Best Mainstage Production: The Wild Duck (Belvoir)
- Best Direction of a Mainstage Production: Simon Stone (The Wild Duck)
- Best Actress in a Leading Role in a Mainstage Production: Cate Blanchett (Gross und Klein)
- Best Actor in a Leading Role in a Mainstage Production: Colin Moody (Julius Caesar)
- Best Independent Production: The Libertine (Sport for Jove Theatre with Darlinghurst Theatre Company)
- Best New Australian Work: The Dark Room (Angela Betzien)
- Best Production of a Musical: Hairspray
- Lifetime Achievement Award: David Williamson

== See also ==
- Glugs Theatrical Awards
