= Flat Earthers: The Musical =

Flat Earthers
- The Musical
- Music: Lou Wall; James Gales
- Lyrics: Jean Tong; Lou Wall
- Book: Jean Tong; Lou Wall
- Premiere: 17 October 2024: Hayes Theatre, Sydney

Flat Earthers: The Musical is a musical with a book and lyrics by Jean Tong and Lou Wall, and music by Wall and James Gales. It premiered at the Hayes Theatre in Sydney, Australia, on 17 October 2024. The production was a co-production between the Hayes Theatre and Griffin Theatre Company.

== Premise ==
Ria and Flick meet online and quickly develop a romantic connection. Their relationship is complicated when Flick reveals that she is a Flat Earth believer living in her parents' bunker. To maintain the relationship, Ria falsely claims that she shares Flick's beliefs.

== Production ==
Flat Earthers: The Musical began previews at the Hayes Theatre on 11 October 2024, before its official opening on 17 October 2024. The production ran until 9 November 2024.

== Reception ==
Flat Earthers: The Musical received mixed reviews from critics. Writing for The Guardian, Cassie Tongue described the production as "lightning-fast and slyly sweet" and praised its set design, lighting, video elements, and animation. However, she suggested that the show's structure would benefit from tighter editing, arguing that its emphasis on humour and musicality sometimes came at the expense of narrative resolution.

Suzy Wrong of Suzy Goes See was critical of the production's extensive use of video elements, writing that they made the show overly complicated and weakened its central themes. She nevertheless praised the portrayal of the romantic relationship between the two leads.

David Spicer of Stage Whispers similarly noted shortcomings in the musical's book.

Reviewing the production for ArtsHub, Helenna Barone-Peters acknowledged its intentionally exaggerated style but felt that the show would benefit from more grounded and emotionally authentic moments, arguing that some of its underlying themes were overshadowed by its eccentricity.

== Musical numbers ==
Act I

- "Ultimate Debunker" – Ria, Heather Debunker, Bella Debunker, Lee Debunker, and Debunkers ensemble
- "Perfect Girl" – Ria and Flick
- "Ultimate Debunker (Reprise)" – Ria, Heather Debunker, Bella Debunker, and Lee Debunker
- "WTF (Welcome To Flat-Earth)" – Flick, Mum Freya, Ma Fiona, Frank, Felix, and Faith
- "Dumbest Girl" – Ria and Flick
- "Dark Web" – Ria, Flick, and conspiracists
- "Next Level" – Ria and Flat Earth ensemble
- "You Know" – Heather Debunker, Ria, Flick, Mum Freya, Ma Fiona, Frank, Felix, and Faith
- "Illuminati Parti" – Mz Prism, Jared, Jess, and Illuminati Parti ensemble

Act II

- "The End Is Nigh" – Ria, Flick, Mz Prism, Jared, Jess, and ensemble
- "Beyond The Edge" – Flick and Ria
- "WTF (Reprise)" – Flick
- "Leave The Bunker" – Flick, Frank, Felix, and Faith
- "Back To The Beginning" – Jared and Jess
- "Good Things Come In Threes" – Mz Prism and Illuminati Parti ensemble
- "Open Up" – Flick, Ria, Heather Debunker, Jared, Jess, Mz Prism, and ensemble
- "Turn & Face The World" – Ria, Flick, Mz Prism, Mum Freya, Ma Fiona, Jared, Jess, and Illuminati Parti ensemble
- "When The Parti's Over" – Ria and Flick
- "Perfect Girl (Reprise)" – Mz Prism, Mum Freya, and Ma Fiona
- "Turn & Face The World (Reprise)" – Ria, Flick, Mz Prism, Mum Fryea, Ma Fiona, Jared, Jess, and Illuminati Parti Ensemble

== Principal cast ==
Role	Performer
Mz Prism	Michelle Brasier
Ma Fiona	Lena Cruz
Flick	Manali Datar
Heather (Note: Per the show's programme, this role also covers the characters of Faith and Jared, along with others.)	Milo Hartill
Mum Freya	Amanda McGregor
Ria	Shannen Alyce Quan
Jessica (Note: Per the show's programme, this role also covers the characters of Bella and Frank, along with others.)	Zarif
Onstage swings	Manon Gunderson-Briggs (Note: Gunderson-Briggs swung for the roles of Mz Prism, Mum Freya, Ma Fiona, Heather, and others.)
Onstage swings	Mel O'Brien (Note: O'Brien swung for the roles of Ria, Flick, Jessica, and others.)
