= Kill Climate Deniers =

2018 play by David Finnigan

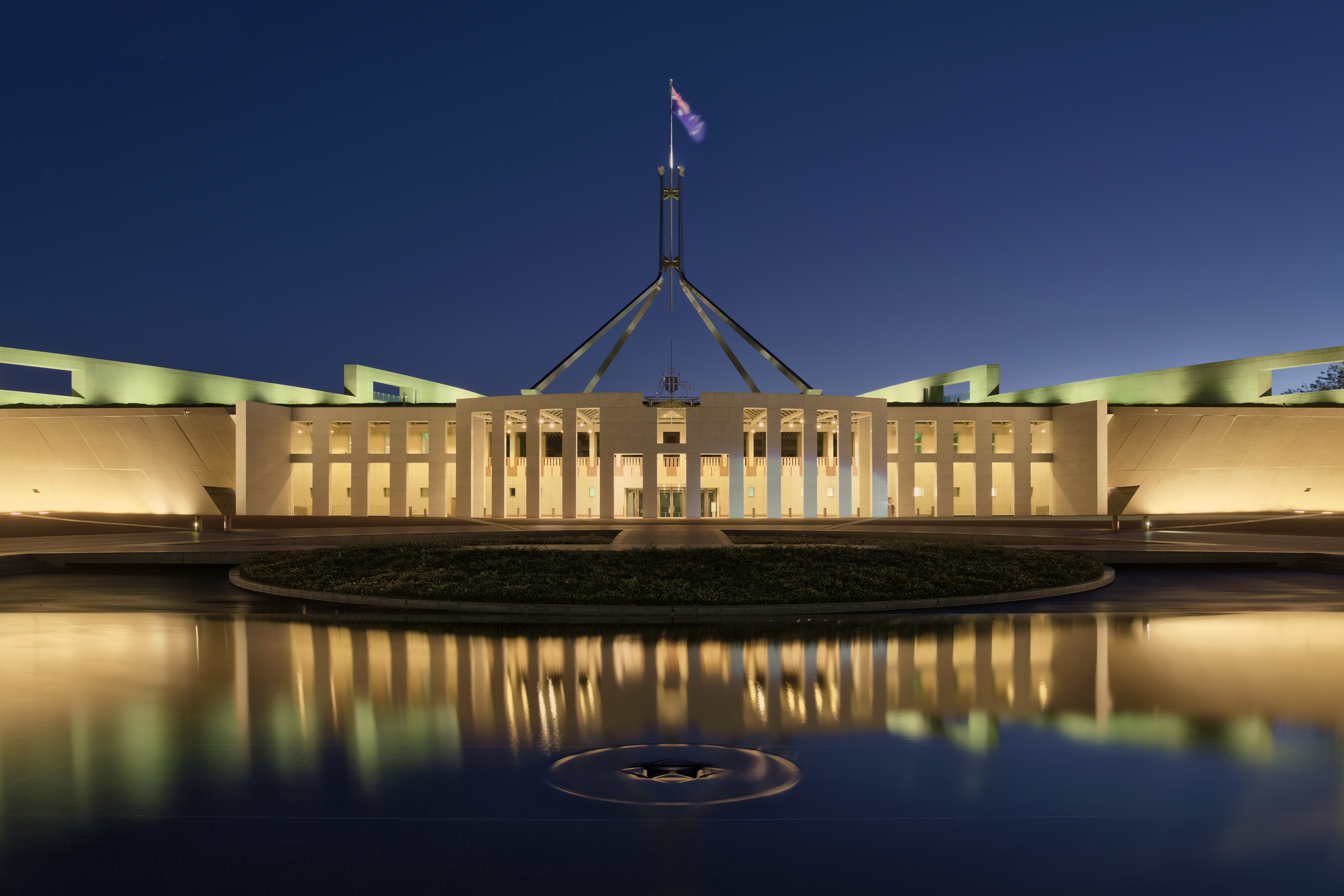
- Parliament House, Canberra: The setting of the play
- Written by: David Finnigan
- Genre: Black Humour

Premiere
- Place: Griffin Theatre, Australia

Kill Climate Deniers is a satirical black comedy play written by playwright, David Finnigan, concerning a group of extremist eco-terrorists who hold 1700 Australian politicians and journalists hostage in Parliament House until a solution to combat climate change is implemented. The play was first performed at Sydney's Griffin Theatre in 2018 following political backlash in 2014 from Andrew Bolt and Brendan Smyth about the theme of terrorism within the play that paused production, despite a $19,000 grant the play received from the ACT Government.

== History ==
In 2014, David Finnigan began writing a script, receiving commission from Canberra's Aspen Island Theatre Company to create a play that would eventually become Kill Climate Deniers. The play was also granted $19,000 towards production costs from the ACT Government through the ArtsACT, that created mass backlash from people unimpressed by the choice to fund a play with a strong political topic of terrorism and climate change. Journalist Andrew Bolt led the revolt against Kill Climate Deniers, criticising the powerful title of the play and the plot involving terrorist action against the Australian Government, Bolt stating; "What sane Government donates to a project urging others to kill fellow citizens, even as a "joke"?"

Similarly in 2014, former Australian politician Brendan Smyth critiqued the decision of the ACT Government to fund a play titled Kill Climate Deniers, arguing, “I don’t care if it’s supposed to be ironic, the title stands on its own. It would not be acceptable if any other group were inserted, and now is not the time to be even joking about this." Smyth further explained that Australian taxpayers' money should not be used for Kill Climate Deniers and it was a bad decision on the Minister's behalf.

In 2016, American news website, Breitbart News, became aware of the Australian play and sarcastically critiqued the choice of the title Kill Climate Deniers, stating that if any other group replaced 'deniers' in the name, funding from the Government would not be granted. Breitbart continued by jokingly stating that they would create a play of their own titled 'Kill Climate Greenies', expecting similar funding to the $19,000 David Finnigan received.

Despite the backlash and criticism, Finnigan continued production on Kill Climate Deniers in 2016, creating and performed a one-man adaptation of his play, titled '(An Attempt to Perform) Kill Climate Deniers' at Canberra's You Are Here Festival in April 2016. Later that year, Finnigan performed in Griffin Theatre's Batch Festival and won the Griffin Theatre Award, granting him $10,000 and the opportunity to stage a full-scale production of Kill Climate Deniers at Griffin Theatre in 2018.

Griffin Theatre's run of Kill Climate Deniers premiered in February 2018 under the direction of Lee Lewis, and along with the story of eco-terrorists invading Parliament House, it also included newly written scenes of (an actor portraying) David Finnigan breaking the fourth wall to directly address the audience about the backlash from Bolt and Smyth during the production phase of the play, and how it impacted the final work. These scenes include projections of news articles from The Canberra Times and angry tweets from people criticising the play, negatively commenting on left-wing and green politics.

== Plot ==
The play opens with Australian Environment Minister Gwen Malkin admiring the night stars with her daughter Cellabrina. Elsewhere, Catch, the leader of an extremist eco-terrorist group, is planning a terrorist attack against the Australian Government.

Malkin has a radio interview with host Jalan Ones (an allusion to Alan Jones). She talks about the Goonyarra Station Project, an attempt to 'blot out the sun with a milky roof over the Earth'. The interview is a failure. Gwen Malkin and her press advisor, Georgina Bekken, prepare for an exclusive Fleetwood Mac concert held at Parliament House. Here, Catch has snuck in with a 3D printer to create weapons for her terrorist attack.

At the concert, Malkin and Bekken go to the bathrooms. Eco-terrorists storm the building and Catch brandishes a rifle on stage. Catch proclaims the whole audience killed unless Australia becomes 100% renewable tonight. Back in the bathrooms, Malkin and Bekken have killed some of the terrorists after a confrontation. Malkin posts a photo of herself with the bodies on social media.

Catch tries to negotiate with the Australian Prime Minister. She kills mining company CEO Remely Clark. She also wounds journalist Beverly Ile, after forcing her to shoot a member of the audience with an unloaded gun.

Malkin and Bekken sneak through the Channel 9 press gallery. They receive a drone care package from the Murdoch Press. It contains merchandise and products for Malkin, who is now the most popular politician on social media. Malkin and Bekken post photos of Malkin wearing merchandise and brandishing weapons to show how serious she is about combating terrorism.

Catch denies the Prime Minister's negotiation attempts and turns to shoot at the audience. Malkin arrives and fires at her and the remaining terrorists. Bekken is killed by Catch in the crossfire. Catch and Malkin fight on the Parliament House flagpole, until Malkin hurls Catch off, killing her.

Thirty years later, Malkin and Cellabrina are looking at the night sky. Malkin has been Prime Minister for the last thirty years, and the Goonyarra Station Project was a success, ridding Australia of bushfires, droughts and floods. However, the stars are invisible due to the blotting out of the sun.

Throughout the play, an actor playing playwright David Finnigan interrupts the plot to insert excerpts of criticism against Kill Climate Deniers. This includes quotes from Brendan Smyth and Andrew Bolt, introducing the notion of 'being Bolted' (gaining popularity through the criticism of journalist Andrew Bolt.)

== Productions ==
=== Initial run ===
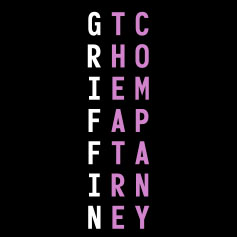
The Griffin Theatre Company logo

Kill Climate Deniers was first performed with Griffin Theatre Company at SBW Stables Theatre in a small run from February 23, 2018 until 7 April 2018. The play premiered under the direction of Lee Lewis and stage design of Jonathan Hindmarsh, with both previously having involvement with Griffin Theatre productions. Additionally, other experienced Griffin Theatre creatives were involved in the show, including Trent Suidgeest as Lighting Designer, Steve Toulmin as Sound Designer, Toby Knyvett as Audiovisual Designer and Khym Scott as Stage Manager.

The Griffin Theatre cast of Kill Climate Deniers consisted of infamous Rebecca Massey as Gwen Malkin, Sheridan Harbridge as Georgina Bekken, Lucia Mastrantone as Catch, Eden Falk as David Finnigan and Emily Havea predominately as a number of terrorists, although many of the cast portray different characters throughout the play. The cast's ability to comment on climate change through comedy was praised highly by critics and director Lee Lewis, who particularly enjoys the comedic duo Rebecca Massey and Sheridan Harbridge portray on stage.

Both Sheridan Harbridge and Emily Havea have made a reappearance on the Griffin Theatre stage since 2018, Harbridge starring in the Griffin Theatre's 2019 run of Suzie Miller's 'Prima Facie' and Havea appearing in Griffin Theatre's 2019 Batch Festival. David Finnigan also returned to Griffin Theatre for the 2019 Batch Festival, premiering his new show, 'You're Safe Till 2024' which also explores the necessity to combat climate change.

The premiere was performed in the SBW Stables Theatre located in Kings Cross, an intimate theatrical performance space known for its unique kite-shaped stage, limited to a small 105-person seating space. Griffin Theatre Company mainly produces Australian Theatre, with their motto stating, "Homegrown inspiration. By you, for you.".

== Characters ==
Listed Characters
Characters	Description	Griffin Theatre Cast (2018)
Gwen Malkin	Australian Environment Minister, mother to Cellabrina	Rebecca Massey
Georgina Bekken	Malkin's press advisor	Sheridan Harbridge
Fleetwood Mac	Band performing at Parliament House	Sheridan Harbridge
Catch	Leader of environmentalist terrorist troop	Lucia Mastrantone
Cellabrina Malkin	Malkin's daughter	Lucia Mastrantone
Remely Clark	CEO of a mining company	Emily Havea
Beverly Ile	TV Journalist	Emily Havea
Throat	Terrorist, undercover as a performer	Emily Havea
Lucky	Terrorist, undercover as a security guard	Emily Havea
Ebb	Terrorist, undercover as a journalist	Emily Havea
David Finnigan*	Playwright of Kill Climate Deniers	Eden Falk

*David Finnigan is not listed as a character in the play, but is meant to be represented by an actor

== Response ==
Professional ratings
Review scores
Source	Rating
TimeOut	4/5 stars
ArtsHub	2/5 stars
Sydney Morning Herald	4/5 stars

After the initial release of Kill Climate Deniers in 2018 at Sydney's Griffin Theatre, critics and reviewers had mixed opinions on the politically controversial play and its portrayal of Australia's critical climate change issues.

TimeOut appreciated the meta theatrical play's use of black humour and unique audio visual design, describing it as a "gleefully anarchic production" that raises a message about climate change in Australia. Many reviewers appreciated the use of comedy to portray a deeply important political message, Australian Stage comments on the 'ludicrous' nature of the play, and its vitality in bringing attention to the effects of global warming. Similarly, theatrical reviewer Suzy Goes See points out that the terrorist theme within the play is utilised only for good intention, and Kill Climate Deniers overall is stylistically impressive and 'unforgettably exhilarating'

ArtsHub found the play "more self-indulgent than political", finding the interruptions from David Finnigan's character to be interruptive to the flow and main plot of the play, detracting from the main message which is about climate activism.

Although reviewer response was varied, some finding the play too confronting and irregular in its meta theatrical portrayal of climate change issues, the response towards Kill Climate Deniers was mainly positive due to the refreshing and enlightening nature of the play.
