= My Brilliant Career (musical) =

Australian musical

- Music: Mathew Frank
- Lyrics: Dean Bryant
- Book: Sheridan Harbridge; Dean Bryant
- Setting: Rural New South Wales; 1895–1899
- Basis: Novel My Brilliant Career by Miles Franklin
- Premiere: 7 November 2024: Southbank Theatre, Melbourne
- Productions: 2024 Melbourne; 2026 Australia tour

My Brilliant Career is an Australian musical based on the novel of the same name by Miles Franklin, with book by Sheridan Harbridge and Dean Bryant, music by Mathew Frank and lyrics by Dean Bryant.

== Principal casts ==
Role	Workshop	Melbourne	National tour
Role	2019	2024	2026
Sybylla Melvyn	Luisa Scrofani	Kala Gare	Kala Gare
Frank Hawden/Bullant M'Swat	Alister Kingsley	Cameron Bajraktarevic-Hayward	Cameron Bajraktarevic-Hayward
Horace Melvyn/Jimmy M'Swat	Unknown	Lincoln Elliott	Lincoln Elliott
Harry Beecham/Peter M'Swat	Andrew Coshan	Raj Labade	Raj Labade
Dick Melvyn/Jay-Jay/Mr M'Swat	Unknown	Drew Livingston	Drew Livingston
Lucy Melvyn/Helen/Mrs M'Swat	Unknown	Christina O'Neill	Christina O'Neill
Gertie Melvyn/Blanche Derrick/Lizer M'Swat	Unknown	HaNy Lee	Melanie Bird
Grannie Bossier/Rose Jane M'Swat	Anne Wood	Ana Mitsikas	Ana Mitsikas

== Musical numbers ==
Act I

- "Prologue"
- "Life As We Know It" – Sybylla
- "Prince of a Girl" – Sybylla, Lucy, Dick
- "Turn Away from the Mirror" – Helen
- "A Girl Who Knows What She Likes" – Jay-Jay
- "Parlour Songs" – Company
- "In the Wrong Key" – Sybylla
- "Brick" – Frank
- "Good Enough" – Sybylla
- "Wait With You" – Harry
- "Make A Success" – Blanche

Act II

- "Ent'racte"
- "A Little Bit More" – Sybylla and Harry
- "The Will (M'Swat)" – M'Swat family
- "Gargoyle" – Sybylla
- "Working My Way" – Harry
- "Goodbye Letter" – Sybylla
- "Someone Like Me" – Sybylla

== Development and production history ==
Bryant and Frank began writing the musical in 2016. It was workshopped in 2019 at Monash University as part of an artist-in-residence program, after which Harbridge joined as a collaborator. The workshop cast featured Luisa Scrofani as Sybylla Melvyn, alongside Andrew Coshan, Alister Kingsley, James Millar, Natalie O’Donnell, and Anne Wood.

My Brilliant Career premiered at the Southbank Theatre for the Melbourne Theatre Company, from 7 November to 21 December 2024. The original production was directed by Anne-Louise Sarks, featuring Kala Gare as Sybylla with an ensemble cast of actor/musicians including Cameron Bajraktarevic-Hayward, Lincoln Elliot, Victoria Falconer, Raj Labade, Drew Livingston, HaNy Lee, Ana Mitsikas, Christina O'Neill and Jarrad Payne.

An Australian tour ran throughout 2026, with seasons in Melbourne, Canberra, Sydney and Wollongong.

== Reception ==
The musical was very well-received including multiple five-star reviews.

Year	Award	Category	Nominee	Result	Ref.
2025	Green Room Awards	Outstanding Production		Won	
2025	Green Room Awards	Outstanding Ensemble/Featured Ensemble	The Company	Won	
2025	Green Room Awards	Outstanding New Australian Music Theatre Writing	Dean Bryant & Sheridan Harbridge (Book) Mathew Frank (Music) Dean Bryant (Lyrics)	Won	
2025	Green Room Awards	Outstanding Choreography	Amy Campbell	Won	
2025	Green Room Awards	Outstanding Direction – Music	Victoria Falconer	Won	
2025	Green Room Awards	Outstanding Artist – Leading Role	Kala Gare	Nominated	
2025	Green Room Awards	Outstanding Artist – Supporting Role	Raj Labade	Nominated	
2025	Green Room Awards	Outstanding Direction – Stage	Anne-Louise Sarks	Nominated	
2025	Green Room Awards	Outstanding Design	Marg Horwell	Nominated	
2026	AWGIE Awards	$120,000 David Williamson Prize for Excellence in Writing for Australian Theatre	Sheridan Harbridge, Dean Bryant, Mathew Frank and Melbourne Theatre Company	Won	
2026	AWGIE Awards	Best Script In Musical Theatre	Sheridan Harbridge, Dean Bryant, Mathew Frank	Won	

== Recording ==
Original Cast Recording

My Brilliant Career (Original Cast Recording)

Cast recording by Dean Bryant and Mathew Frank
- Released: 18 October 2025
- Genre: Show tunes
- Length: 54:18
- Label: Independent

Following the 2019 workshop at Monash University, a cast recording was produced in January 2020, featuring additional performers Jerome Javier and Melanie Bird.

No.	Title	Performer(s)	Length
1.	"Prologue"	Luisa Scrofani	1:51
2.	"Life as We Know It"	Scrofani	3:27
3.	"Prince of a Girl"	Scrofani; James Millar	3:37
4.	"Turn Away from the Mirror"	Natalie O'Donnell	3:40
5.	"A Girl Who Knows What She Likes"	Jerome Javier	1:10
6.	"In the Wrong Key"	Scrofani	3:59
7.	"Brick"	Alister Kingsley	1:52
8.	"Good Enough"	Scrofani	2:42
9.	"Wait with You"	Andrew Coshan	2:22
10.	"Make a Success"	Melanie Bird	2:44
11.	"A Little Bit More"	Coshan; Scrofani	4:44
12.	"That Girl"	Wood	2:07
13.	"When We Walk"	Kingsley; Javier; Scrofani	1:47
14.	"The Will"	Kingsley; Scrofani	4:58
15.	"In the Dark"	Scrofani	2:18
16.	"Working My Way"	Coshan	2:56
17.	"Mists of Avalon"	O'Donnell; Bird	3:04
18.	"Goodbye Letter"	Scrofani; Coshan	1:30
19.	"Someone Like Me"	Scrofani	3:30
Total length:			54:18

Australian Tour Cast Recording

A sneak peek of the Australian tour official cast album was first presented in a panel talk with Victoria Falconer, Mathew Frank and Kala Gare. The release date is unknown.
