= Fierceland =

2025 novel by Omar Musa

- Author: Omar Musa
- Language: English
- Genre: Novel
- Publisher: Penguin
- Publication date: 2 September 2025
- Publication place: Australia
- Media type: Print
- Pages: 384 pp.
- Awards: 2026 Miles Franklin Award, winner; 2026 Victorian Premier's Prize for Fiction, winner
- ISBN: 9781926428796

Fierceland is a 2025 novel by Malaysian Australian writer and musician Omar Musa. It is the winner of the top literary prize in Australia, the Miles Franklin Award, as well as the Victorian Premier's Prize for Fiction. Set mostly on the island of Borneo, it addresses environmental degradation and deforestation in Malaysia.

== Background ==
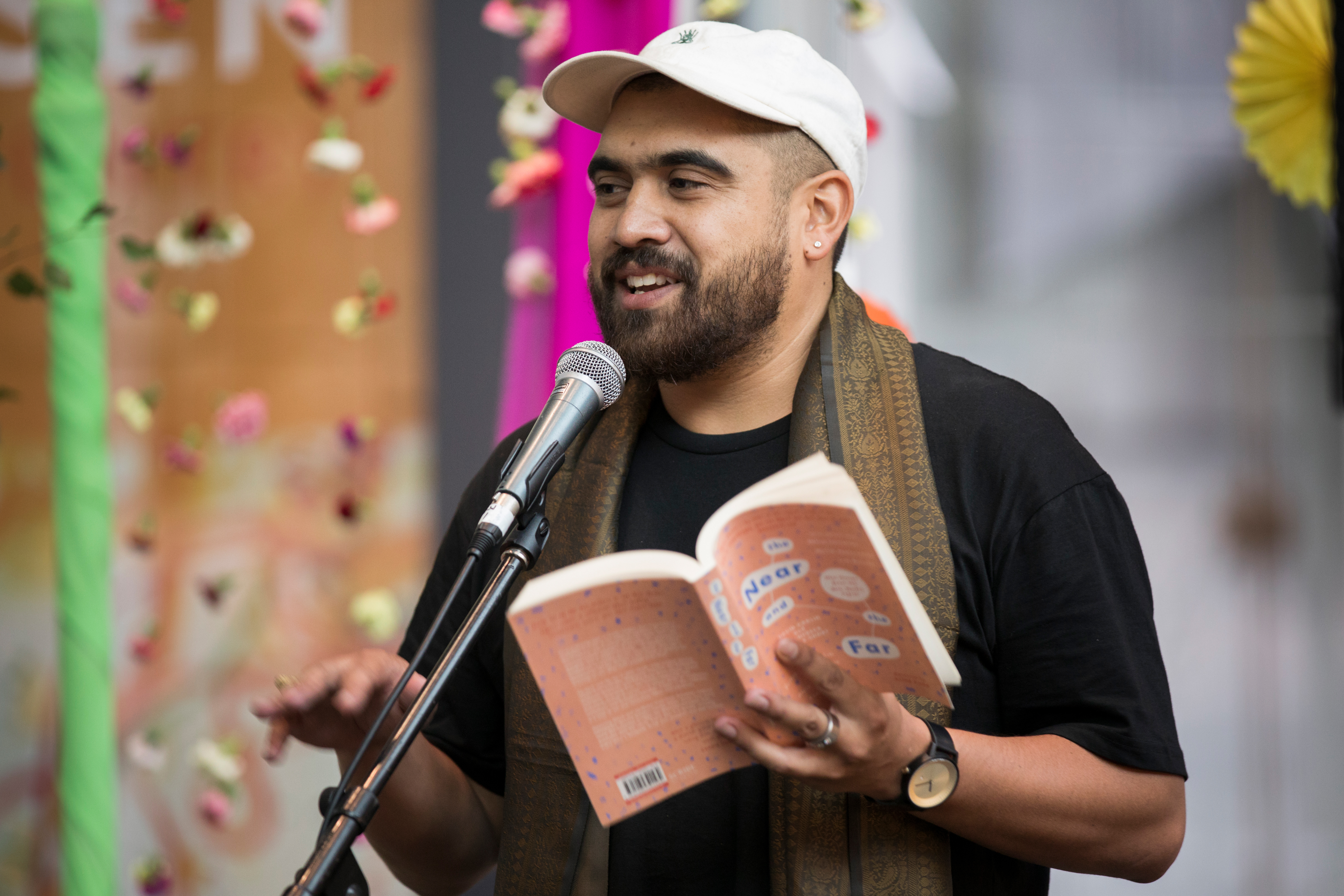
Author Omar Musa in 2017.

Fierceland is the second novel by Malaysian-Australian novelist, playwright, poet, rapper, and visual artist Omar Musa. His mother is Australian, while his father, one of nine siblings is from Kota Kinabalu, Sabah, on the island of Borneo. Many family members worked on oil-palm plantations. Musa had only visited Borneo a few times as a child, but reconnected with his Malaysian family when in his 20s, travelling there at least once a year, before moving back to Kota Kinabalu in 2024.

Musa took six years, and he produced 21 drafts before publishing the novel. During this time, he embraced sobriety, met and married his wife, and his best friend died.

== Synopsis ==
The novel follows the children of a wealthy palm oil baron in Sabah, Harun and Rozana, who are traumatised by a trip into the rainforest with their father. Living "self-indulgent lives as a tech bro in Los Angeles and an artist in Sydney" as adults, they return to Kota Kinabalu for his funeral and must confront their past. The novel addresses environmental degradation and deforestation. It follows several different time periods and locations, and includes elements of poetry and verse, with one poem written by Musa translated into several of the languages of Sabah.

== Genre, language, and themes ==
Written in English, it also features words from Malay, Manglish, and Tamil. The novel spans five locations and around 170 years, and has been described as an epic novel, and incorporates a piece about the hikayat, a type of Malay folk epic.

Musa said that he had "wanted to show that there are more interlinkages between post-colonial nations like Malaysia and Australia than we might think". He said that he had deliberately set himself a "gargantuan task" as he wrote the novel, "imagining himself as the forest itself and making it a major character".

== Reception ==
The novel was reviewed by Seren Heyman-Griffiths in The Guardian, who wrote: "Fierceland is formally restless, weaving voices, poems, myths and histories into a tapestry of a family and a landscape in flux. Musa is at his best when he's playing with language, slipping from narrative prose into cadence and chant, conjuring the 'extravagant and violent lushness' of the forest". Eddin Khoo, writing in The Edge, said: "Most of all, Fierceland demonstrates the best qualities of nuance and sensitivity, in its careful, clever use of the word sayang (Note: "Dear", "darling", or "a dearly loved person (often used as a term of endearment), according to the Cambridge Dictionary.) — surely the most infectious and beautiful word anywhere in the world.

Rosie Milne, writing in Asian Review of Books, says: "Musa treats the Bornean rainforest not just as a setting, or as a focus of moral outrage, but as a character, a witness to its own destruction, and as a poet with its own distinct voice, here lamenting its trees being turned into tables... but though Fierceland is an angry novel, it never feels like it’s preaching, or lecturing; its urgency feels like an irresistible invitation to think, and to act".

Giacomo Bianchino of the University of Sydney has some criticisms: "The tension between the novelistic attention to psychology and detail and the epic tendency to breadth of scale and form makes – and unmakes – this book"; however, concludes: "'The Song of the Forest' alone is an undertaking that carries Musa's novel out of the usual orbit of Australian literature. Fierceland is a tenacious reckoning with an impossible situation.

A reviewer on the Readings website wrote: "This is an ambitious and important novel that interweaves Malaysian history, environmental degradation, cultural heritage, artistic endeavours and fucked-up families. And that description doesn’t even scratch the surface. Highly recommended".

== Accolades ==
In 2026, it won the Victorian Premier's Prize for Fiction and the Miles Franklin Award, worth A$60,000. It was also shortlisted for the fiction category of The Age Book of the Year Awards.
