= Zombie! The Musical =

2024 musical by Laura Murphy

Zombie!
- The Musical
- Music: Laura Murphy
- Lyrics: Laura Murphy
- Book: Laura Murphy
- Setting: Sydney, 1999
- Premiere: 8 March 2024: Hayes Theatre, Sydney
- Awards: TimeOut Sydney Arts and Culture Award for Best Musical; Sydney Theatre Award for Best Production of A Musical; Sydney Theatre Award for Best Direction of A Musical; Sydney Theatre Award for Best Choreography of A Musical

Zombie! The Musical is an Australian musical with book, music, and lyrics by Laura Murphy. This is Laura Murphy's second original musical after The Lovers and her third musical for music and lyrics after The Dismissal.

== Premise ==
Zombie! is a horror-comedy musical that mixes traditional musical theatre and cult-classic zombie films, like 42nd Street but with zombies.

Sydney, Australia. It's the turn of the 21st century, and a dedicated community theatre troupe is frantically rehearsing in the final hours before their big opening night. Little do they know that beyond the walls of the theatre, a highly infectious disease is rapidly spreading through the city – turning its victims into full-blown zombies. Will humanity take its final bow, or can the power of musical theatre save the friggin' world?

The musical follows an ambitious starlet, an optimistic understudy and an ol' hoofer (who thought she'd seen it all) as they're faced with an impossible dilemma – what role to play in humanity's final act? They discover that impending doom has a funny way of revealing our true character.

Grab your torch, your pitchforks, and your headshot. The apocalypse begins in 5, 6, 7, 8...

== Synopsis ==
The following is modified summary of the official synopsis.

=== Act I ===
In Sydney 1999, a community theatre is rehearsing a generic musical hours before opening night ("The Big Opening"). The leading man Dave announces he is leaving right now for a professional production of Rent. Leading lady Felicity suggests she can cover leading man role while Sam can understudy her leading lady role. However director George rebuffs saying Felicity doesn't have what it takes to play the hero ("He Does It Because He Loves Me"). He instead phone calls incapable Hope's male cousin to take over the role.

Felicity and other ensemble Sam, Mila and Hope - all confront George and demand for interesting nuanced female roles. Carol also shares same pain as being aged out of the ingénue trope ("Meaty Part").

Suddenly there's a blackout. A radio broadcast warns there is a rapid spreading virus that has symptoms of desire to consume human flesh. It also suggests to stay indoors which Dave ignores and gets bitten by an unknown creature. The troupe scatter in fear. Transformed zombified Dave eventually catches up to Felicity, Sam and Carol and target attacks Felicity ("Into Your Brains").

Felicity, Sam and Carol escapes and finds the others Trace and Hope in another room. Stage manager Trace has restrained zombified Mila and theorises they are ghouls that feast on victim's emotional vulnerabilities. Sam suggests not to jump to conclusions as "everyone has a backstory". Trace teaches a self-defence workshop on costumed mannequins as Hope leaves to find her boyfriend Dave ("Put Up A Fight").

Hope leaves a voice message to Dave stating that musicals has taught her to always stick by him "despite the obvious red flags" ("Not a Monster"). She finds Dave who attacks her.

Elsewhere a televised broadcast of Doctor von Schreiber theorises that aggression strengthens virus' infection while calmness may help de-escalate it.

Back in the theatre, Felicity directs Sam and Carol search for Hope while she and Trace figure plan of attack.

As Carol and Sam searches, Sam expresses her concern to Carol that Felicity is assuming the worse by wrongfully demonising Dave and Mila. Carol suggests Sam's kindness can help reason with Felicity.

Elsewhere, a lone George stumbles on zombified Dave who now embodies George's distant father longing his connection ("Take After Your Old Man"). As Dave is about to bite George, Sam impulsively starts to sing which stuns Dave. Carol and George join in and with Sam's opening night card, Dave happily appears to be cured ("A Really Good Doorknob"). Unfortunately Felicity bursts in and decapitates Dave ("Put Up A Fight (Reprise)").

=== Act II ===
A montage of apocalyptic chaos spreading across Sydney as the suspected Y2K virus bug takes hold ("You Think You Know Someone").

Back at the theatre, everyone is shocked at Felicity's gruesome murder on Dave - and Sam theorises musical theatre can heal the infected. The group discovers George was bitten by Dave and Felicity suggests decapitation before he turns - which Sam defends against. Felicity states both Dave and George has "something rotten" inside them and that the virus is revealing their true self ("Heroes and Monsters”).

The remaining group of Carol, Trace and George chooses to follow Sam's theory on healing power of musicals and parts ways with Felicity. Before Sam leaves, Sam tells Felicity she has an unfinished opening night card for her but doesn't have the heart to finish it if she continues down her dark path.

As the group walks away and brainstorms a musical to perform, Carol asks what role she would play which they dismissively suggests "the mum" character. Carol disheartened falls behind and encounters a zombified Hope embodying her younger self ("Carol's Last Dance"). Mesmerised by her youthful memories she gets bitten by Hope.

Elsewhere a televised broadcast Doctor von Schreiber has discovered the head and body can continue to function even after decapitation. He warns however humanity is lost if one cuts the connection from head to heart.

Back at the theatre, Sam discovers Carol is missing as George starts to zombify. Trace sacrifices herself so Sam can escape to find Carol. Sam discovers Carol beginning to turn and Sam tries finding her opening night card in attempts to save her. However it's too late as Carol transforms into a heartless version of Felicity, preying on Sam's emotional vulnerabilities of self-worth and belonging ("Insignificant"). Sam loses all hope and succumbs to Carol's bite.

Felicity, wielding an axe after her murder spree within the theatre, discovers Sam in an infected state. A helicopter broadcast reports a zombie horde are swarming towards the theatre and the military are planning to destroy the building and the horde together.

Sam urges Felicity to escape by waving down the helicopter from the roof but Felicity believes this to be a trap as she would bite when her back is turned. Sam agrees and begs Felicity to kill her before she turns.

Felicity chooses compassion over hostility and sings an improvised opening night card to Sam which heals her bite. One by one, other zombified members of the group arrive and Sam song for her love for community theatre cures them all ("Ensemble Player").

As infected swarm are closing in, Sam and Felicity perform together directly to the zombie horde and restoring their humanity successfully ("All Together Now").

Couple months later, the community theatre group has gained international recognition for resolving the zombie Y2K virus. It's opening night for newly created Ghoul! The Musical written by Sam and directed by Felicity. Carol finally gets her meaty part starring as lead role of "Ghoulie Andrews" ("The Even Bigger Opening").

== Principal cast ==
The principal cast are as follows:

Role	Performer
Sam	Natalie Abbott
Carol	Tamsin Carroll
Hope	Chelsea Dawson
Trace	Nancy Denis
Nathan Arnsley	Adam Di Martino
Dave	Ryan González
Felicity	Stefanie Jones
George	Drew Livingston
Mila / Doctor von Schreiber	Monique Sálle
The Musical Director	Damon Wade

== Musical numbers ==
Musical numbers are as follows:

Act I

- "Zombie! The Musical Overture"
- "The Big Opening" – Company
- "He Does It Because He Loves Me" – Music Director, Carol, Sam, Hope, Mila, George
- "Meaty Part" – Felicity, Sam, George, Hope, Mila, Carol
- "Into Your Brains" – Dave, Carol, Felicity, Sam and Company
- "Put Up A Fight" – Trace, Felicity, Carol, Sam, Hope
- "Not A Monster" – Hope, Dave
- "Take After Your Old Man" – Dave, George, Sam and Company
- "A Really Good Doorknob" – Sam, Carol, George, Dave
- "Put Up A Fight (Reprise)" – Felicity, Dave

Act II

- "You Think You Know Someone" – Company
- "Heroes and Monsters" – Felicity
- "Carol's Last Dance" – Hope, Carol and Company
- "Insignificant" – Carol, Sam and Company
- "Ensemble Player" – Felicity, Sam, Carol, George, Trace, Mila, Dave, Hope
- "All Together Now" – Sam, Felicity
- "The Even Bigger Opening" – Company

== Production ==
The original production, directed by Darren Yap, was performed from 8 March to 6 April 2024 at the Hayes Theatre with a sold out season by 18th March.

== Reception ==
The musical was well-received with critics praising the satirical camp humour, the outstanding cast and crew, and the clever use of countless musical theatre, zombie and nostalgic 90s references throughout the script, songs, costumes, choreography and set design.

Kate Prendergast from The Sydney Morning Herald described the music "catchy" and satisfies "both musical theatre enthusiasts and cult horror fans". This is further elaborated by Charlotte Smee from TimeOut that stated it's "veritably stuffed with meta-musical-theatre references, camp (gory) goodness, and genre-bending tunes" and that it "is filled with talent, laughs, and plenty of blood and gore." Rita Bratovich from CityHub summarised "the production features a magnificent cast and crew, fantastic songs and a storyline that should make it appeal to absolutely everybody" and that it is "diabolically witty, devilishly funny, demonically clever and frightfully entertaining show".

=== Awards ===
Zombie! received 6 nominations and won 4 awards:

Award	Category	Nominee	Result
TimeOut Sydney Arts and Culture Award	Best Musical		Won
Sydney Theatre Awards	Best Production of A Musical		Won
Sydney Theatre Awards	Best Direction of A Musical	Darren Yap	Won
Sydney Theatre Awards	Best Performance in a Supporting Role in A Musical	Tamsin Carroll	Nominated
Sydney Theatre Awards	Best Musical Direction of A Musical	Damon Wade	Nominated
Sydney Theatre Awards	Best Choreography of A Musical	Chiara Assetta	Won

== Cast recording ==
An album of the musical was released for streaming in November 2025 featuring the full original cast.

No.	Title	Performer(s)	Length
1.	"Zombie! The Musical Overture"	-	0:53
2.	"The Big Opening"	Ryan González; Nancy Denis; Natalie Abbott; Drew Livingston; Stefanie Jones; Tamsin Carroll; Company	4:59
3.	"He Does It Because He Loves Me"	Damon Wade; Abbott; Carroll; Jones; Monique Sálle; Chelsea Dawson; Livingston	1:40
4.	"Meaty Part"	Jones; Abbott; Livingston; Sálle; Dawson; Carroll	7:48
5.	"Into Your Brains"	González; Jones; Carroll; Abbott; Company	5:57
6.	"Put Up A Fight"	Denis; Jones; Carroll; Abbott	3:09
7.	"Not A Monster"	Dawson; González	2:24
8.	"Take After Your Old Man"	González; Livingston; Company	3:43
9.	"A Really Good Doorknob"	Abbott; Carroll; Livingston; González	3:42
10.	"Put Up A Fight (Reprise)"	Jones	1:48
11.	"You Think You Know Someone"	González; Sálle; Dawson; Company	3:52
12.	"Heroes and Monsters"	Jones	3:29
13.	"Carol’s Last Dance"	Dawson; Carroll; Company	3:38
14.	"Insignificant"	Carroll; Abbott; Company	3:48
15.	"Ensemble Member"	Jones; Abbott; Carroll; Denis; Company	2:21
16.	"All Together Now"	Abbott; Jones; Company	3:26
17.	"The Even Bigger Opening"	González; Denis; Livingston; Carroll; Dawson; Company	1:42
Total length:			58:17
