= Sam Strong (director) =

Australian theatre director

Sam Strong is an Australian theatre director and arts leader; he was the artistic director of Queensland Theatre Company (2015–2019) and of Griffin Theatre Company (2010–2013). He has also been Chair of Circa and the Associate Artistic Director of Melbourne Theatre Company.

== Personal life ==
Strong was born in Nowra, New South Wales and is the son of late Australian businessman James Strong. Strong was Dux of Geelong Grammar School and graduated from the University of Melbourne with a BA(Hons) LLB(Hons) and the Victorian College of the Arts with a Graduate Diploma of Dramatic Art (Directing). He was admitted to practice as a barrister and solicitor in the Supreme Court of Victoria and practised as a solicitor at Freehills.

== Career ==
From 2006 to 2008, Strong was the dramaturg in residence at Red Stitch Actors Theatre, where he co-founded the Red Stitch Writers residency and directed the Green Room Award-winning Red Sky Morning. From 2008 to 2010, he was Literary Associate at Belvoir, where he dramarturged the hit Brendan Cowell play Ruben Guthrie. From 2010 to 2013, Strong was artistic director of Griffin Theatre Company, where he directed successful revivals of contemporary Australian classics, tripled subscribers, and directed the highest selling show in the company's history (The Boys).

From 2013 to 2015, Strong was the associate artistic director of Melbourne Theatre Company, where he directed the theatrical debuts of visual artist Callum Morton and the group Working Dog Productions.

Strong has directed many of Australia's leading actors including Justine Clarke, Lucy Durack, Colin Friels, Noni Hazlehurst, Asher Keddie, Lachy Hulme, Robyn Nevin, Josh McConville, Luke Mullins, Pamela Rabe, Kat Stewart, Erik Thomson, Hugo Weaving, and David Wenham.

Strong commenced as artistic director of Queensland Theatre Company in November 2015 and was appointed chair of contemporary circus company, Circa in April 2015.

Strong launched his first season as artistic director on 12 September 2016 with a rebranding of the company to Queensland Theatre (QT). Strong also announced nine commitments for his 2017 season that will deliver on the company's vision to lead the nation from Queensland, including opening a world premiere production in Cairns, performing in 15 interstate venues, gender parity of writers and directors and one third diverse casting.

Strong's first season at Queensland Theatre (2017) achieved the largest box office in the company's history. In the same year, Strong became only the second director in the history of the awards to have two productions nominated for Best Play in the one year at the Helpmann Awards. Strong announced his departure from QT in March 2019, stating that he was relocating to Melbourne to support his wife's career

Highlights of Strong's four years at Queensland Theatre include the renovation of the Bille Brown Theatre, achieving subscriber growth that made the company the fastest growing in Australia, directing the highest selling new Australian play in the company's history, and securing RACQ as an inaugural principal partner.

Strong's time at Queensland Theatre was also marked by a focus on new plays (leading the company to be described as the "National home of new stories", and creating the next generation of Aboriginal and Torres Strait Islander stories such as My Name is Jimi and City of Gold.

Strong's fourth season 2020 will include him directing the stage premiere of Trent Dalton’s novel Boy Swallows Universe.

In September 2019, it was announced that Lee Lewis (who succeeded Strong at Griffin) would be the next Artistic Director of Queensland Theatre.

As of 2024, Sam Strong is currently the Creative Director and CEO at Gasworks Arts Park in Melbourne.

== Productions ==
2008

- Red Sky Morning by Tom Holloway (Red Stitch Actors Theatre)
- Shedding by Melissa Bubnic (La Mama)

2009

- Faces in the Crowd by Leo Butler (Red Stitch Actors Theatre)
- Thom Pain (based on nothing) by Will Eno (B Sharp)
- Tender by Nicki Bloom [Staged Reading] (Melbourne Theatre Company)
- The Sea Project by Elise Hurst [Staged Reading] (Melbourne Theatre Company)
- Red Sky Morning by Tom Holloway (Red Stitch Actors Theatre return season)

2010

- Madagascar by J.T. Rogers (Melbourne Theatre Company)
- The Power of Yes by David Hare (Belvoir St Theatre)
- Red Sky Morning by Tom Holloway (Red Stitch Actors Theatre national tour)

2011

- And No More Shall We Part by Tom Holloway (Griffin Theatre Company)
- Speaking in Tongues by Andrew Bovell (Griffin Theatre Company)

2012

- Between Two Waves by Ian Meadows (Griffin Theatre Company)
- Les Liaisons dangereuses by Christopher Hampton (Sydney Theatre Company)
- The Boys by Gordon Graham (Griffin Theatre Company/Sydney Festival)

2013

- Other Desert Cities by Jon Robin Baitz (Melbourne Theatre Company)
- The Crucible by Arthur Miller (Melbourne Theatre Company)
- The Floating World by John Romeril (Griffin Theatre Company)

2014

- Private Lives by Noël Coward
- The Speechmaker by Santo Cilauro, Tom Gleisner & Rob Sitch (Melbourne Theatre Company)
- The Sublime by Brendan Cowell (Melbourne Theatre Company)

2015

- Masquerade by Kate Mulvany (Sydney Festival/Griffin Theatre Company/State Theatre Company of South Australia/Melbourne Festival)
- The Weir by Conor McPherson (Melbourne Theatre Company)
- Endgame by Samuel Beckett (Melbourne Theatre Company)

2016

- Jasper Jones based on the novel by Craig Silvey, adapted by Kate Mulvany (Melbourne Theatre Company)
- Double Indemnity by Tom Holloway, adapted from the book by James M Cain (Melbourne Theatre Company)

2017

- Noises Off! by Michael Frayn (Queensland Theatre/Melbourne Theatre Company)
- Once in Royal David's City by Michael Gow (Queensland Theatre/Black Swan State Theatre Company)

2018

- Twelfth Night by William Shakespeare (Queensland Theatre) with music by Tim Finn
- Jasper Jones based on the novel by Craig Silvey, adapted by Kate Mulvany (Queensland Theatre restaging the Melbourne Theatre Company production)
- Nearer the Gods by David Williamson (Queensland Theatre)

2019

- Hydra by Sue Smith (Queensland Theatre/State Theatre Company South Australia)
- Storm Boy by Colin Thiele, adapted for the stage by Tom Holloway (Queensland Theatre/Melbourne Theatre Company)

== Awards ==
- Winner Best Director Sydney Theatre Awards 2013 (The Floating World)
- Nominated for Best Director Green Room Awards 2014 (The Sublime)
- Nominated for Best Production Sydney Theatre Awards 2013 (The Floating World)
- Nominated for Best Director Sydney Theatre Awards 2012 (The Boys)
- Nominated for Best Production Sydney Theatre Awards 2012 (The Boys)
- Nominated for Best Production Sydney Theatre Awards 2012 (Les Liaisons dangereuses)
- Nominated for Best Play Helpmann Awards 2012 (The Boys)
- Nominated for Best Director Helpmann Awards 2012 (The Boys)
- Nominated for Best Director Sydney Theatre Awards 2010 (The Power of Yes)
- Nominated for Best Director Greenroom Awards 2009 (Red Sky Morning)
- Nominated for Best Play Helpmann Awards 2017 (Once in Royal David's City)
- Nominated for Best Play Helpmann Awards 2017 (Jasper Jones)
- Nominated for Best Production Green Room Awards 2017 (Jasper Jones)
- Nominated for Best Director Green Room Awards 2017 (Jasper Jones)
