= Australian Poetry Slam =

Australian Poetry Slam is an annual Slam poetry competition run within Australia. Contestants of all ages, experiences and talents perform live and are judged by the audience to determine the best both locally and nationally through a succession of heats and finals. It is run in the style of an "open slam" in which anyone is able to register to perform. Events are typically hosted by the previous year's Australian Poetry Slam Champion or another established performing writer.

== History ==
Australian Poetry Slam began in 2005, progressing from individual regions and states to the national competition it is today. This was largely made possible by Word Travels partnership with government libraries from 2005 until 2009, and the collaboration continues to exist on a lesser scale. It developed into a national competition in 2007, during which Marc Testart was crowned the first Australian Poetry Slam Champion. National poetry slams, with a similar format also occur in America, Canada, New Zealand and an increasing quantity of African nations.

=== Word Travels ===
Miles Merrill brought poetry slams from Chicago to Australia both through his own artistic endeavours and by founding Word Travels. Merrill remains the creative director of Word Travels. In 2010 Word Travels was approved as an incorporation and not-for-profit arts association. Word Travels created and continues to run the Australian Poetry Slam both through government funding and grants, as well as donations from the public.

=== Story Week ===
Word Travels has additionally created an annual literary festival known as Story Week (formerly Story-Fest until 2019) which coincides with the Sydney, New South Wales and National Finals of the Australian Poetry Slam. Story Week takes place throughout various locations in Sydney, NSW and typically includes workshops, forums and performances by local and international artists. Artists involved in Story Week have included Ian Keteku, Sukhjit Kaur Khalsa, Kaie Kellough and Deborah Emmanuel.

== Rules ==
The Australian Poetry Slam has a fairly compact set of rules aimed at controlling participation, organising logistics and increasing fairness. The current Australian Poetry Slam rules are listed on the Australian Poetry Slam website.

== Format ==
The competition begins annually with over 50 heats representing local council areas around Australia. Poets with the highest scores from each heat progress to regional, state or territory finals. Many heats are run specifically for the Australian Poetry Slam competition, with several run in partnership with local spoken word events such as West Side Poetry Slam and Enough Said Poetry Slam in New South Wales.

A popular tradition of the poetry slam format is that whilst audiences applaud after each performance, they additionally click throughout the performance to encourage the poet. This allows audiences to provide direct feedback regarding which lines, phrases or gestures connected with them the best, without distracting from the performance.

=== Prizes ===
Previous prizes for first place have included the opportunity to perform at Byron Writers Festival, Ubud Writers and Readers Festival, Singapore Writers Festival and Hong Kong International Literary Festival, with expenses for the tour paid by Word Travels and their partners. The Australian Poetry Slam Champion has also received a two-week writing retreat in New South Wales with Bundanon Trust.

If the winner of the Australian Poetry Slam is under 18 year age or not an Australian resident they are instead awarded a cash prize.

== Previous champions ==
- 2020 Australian Poetry Slam Champion - Ren Alessandra, a poet from Melbourne
- 2019 Australian Poetry Slam Champion - wāni Le Frère, a poet from Melbourne
- 2018 Australian Poetry Slam Champion - Melanie Mununggurr-Williams, a poet from the Northern Territory
- 2017 Australian Poetry Slam Champion - Solli Raphael, a young poet from Coffs Harbour
- 2017 Australian Poetry Slam Adult Champion - Jesse Oliver, a poet from Perth
- 2016 Australian Poetry Slam Champion - Arielle Cottingham, residing in Melbourne that year, but spends most of her time in Texas, US
- 2015 Australian Poetry Slam Champion - Phillip Wilcox, a poet from Nowra
- 2014 Australian Poetry Slam Champion - Zohab Zee Khan, a poet from rural NSW with Pakistani heritage
- 2013 Australian Poetry Slam Champion - Jesse John Brand, a poet from Newcastle
- 2012 Australian Poetry Slam Champion - CJ Bowerbird, a poet from the Australian Capital Territory
- 2011 Australian Poetry Slam Champion - Luka Lesson, a poet from Melbourne
- 2010 Australian Poetry Slam Champion - Kelly-Lee Hickey, a poet from the Northern Territory
- 2009 Australian Poetry Slam Champion - Sarah Taylor, a poet from Newcastle
- 2008 Australian Poetry Slam Champion - Omar Musa, a poet from Queanbeyan
- 2007 Australian Poetry Slam Champion - Marc Testart, a poet from Melbourne

== Australian Poetry Slam Youth ==
Australian Poetry Slam Youth (formerly The Rumble Youth Slam until 2018) is a youth poetry slam held annually by Word Travels alongside the Australian Poetry Slam. It is open to young artists between the ages of 12 and 18, and consists of a series of heats in which young poets are encouraged to practice as well as workshops allowing them to develop their skills. The winner of Australian Poetry Slam Youth typically gains the opportunity to perform at that year's Australian Poetry Slam National Final. The rules for Australian Poetry Slam Youth are similar to those of the Australian Poetry Slam.

== Multilingual Poetry Slam ==
The Multilingual Poetry Slam is created and run annually by Word Travels as part of the IN OTHER WORDS festival, with the first event held in 2013. It is a poetry slam held in Sydney that encourages poets to perform in their native language, whatever that may be as all languages are accepted. Through this practice Word Travels aims to celebrate the diversity of language and culture. The 2018 Multilingual Champion was Joseph Schwarzkopf. In 2017 Hasitha Adhikariarachchi was the Multilingual Poetry Slam Champion. The 2016 Multilingual Champion was Bhupen Thakkar.
