= WTFAQ =

Australian television investigative sketch series

- Genre: Comedy
- Directed by: Steven Kirkby, Stef Smith
- Country of origin: Australia
- No. of seasons: 1
- No. of episodes: 8

Production
- Executive producers: Chas Licciardello, Martin Robertson, Mark Sutton

Original release
- Network: ABC1
- Release: 30 August – 18 October 2023

WTFAQ is an Australian television investigative sketch show broadcast on the Australian Broadcasting Corporation (ABC) television station ABC1. It showed comedians investigating and answering viewer questions. The main cast members were Chas Licciardello, Alex Lee, Lawrence Leung, Lou Wall, Cameron James and Kirsten Drysdale. Also appearing on the show were experts in different fields bought in to help answer the questions. While investigating one question Drysdale had her newly born son's name of Methamphetamine Rules accepted by NSW Registry of Births, Deaths and Marriages.
