= Sheridan Harbridge =

Australian actor, writer and director

- Education: National Institute of Dramatic Art (2006)
- Occupations: Actor, writer, theatre director
- Known for: Prima Facie, My Brilliant Career, Phar Lap
- Awards: Sydney Theatre Awards (2019, 2023, 2025); Green Room Award (2025); AWGIE Award (2026)

Sheridan Harbridge is an Australian actor, writer and theatre director, and a three-time winner of the Sydney Theatre Awards, for acting in 2019 and 2023 and for direction in 2025. She originated the role of Tessa Ensler in Suzie Miller's play Prima Facie at Griffin Theatre Company in 2019, winning a Sydney Theatre Award for her performance. She co-wrote the musical adaptation of My Brilliant Career, which won the David Williamson Prize at the 2026 AWGIE Awards, and directed Phar Lap: The Electro-Swing Musical, for which she won the Sydney Theatre Award for Best Direction of a Musical. In 2025 she was named Sydney Theatre Company's Patrick White Fellow.

== Career ==
=== Early career ===
Harbridge graduated in acting from the National Institute of Dramatic Art in 2006. Her early television appearances include All Saints, Rake and The Doctor Blake Mysteries.

In 2012, Harbridge played Amy Cantrowitz in the world-premiere Sydney production of An Officer and a Gentleman, directed by Simon Phillips at the Lyric Theatre.

In 2013, Harbridge received a Mike Walsh Fellowship for acting as a graduate of the National Institute of Dramatic Art.

In 2017, Harbridge played Anni-Frid Lyngstad in the original Sydney production of Muriel's Wedding the Musical, presented by Sydney Theatre Company and Global Creatures at the Roslyn Packer Theatre. The production ran from November 2017 to January 2018.

In 2018, she played Georgina Bekken, the Environment Minister's press adviser, in Griffin Theatre Company's production of Kill Climate Deniers, written by David Finnigan. The production ran at the SBW Stables Theatre in Sydney from 23 February to 7 April 2018.

In a four-star review for Time Out Sydney, critic Cassie Tongue praised Harbridge's comedic performance and her onstage partnership with Rebecca Massey, describing the pair as "a duo to reckon with". Tongue's review highlighted Harbridge's comic talent and her chemistry with Rebecca Massey, describing her as: "one our most natural onstage comedians"

=== Songs for the Fallen ===
Harbridge wrote Songs for the Fallen, a musical about the life of Marie Duplessis, the 19th-century Parisian courtesan who inspired La Dame aux Camélias and La traviata, and played the lead role. The show played seasons in Sydney, Brisbane and Auckland and at Arts Centre Melbourne. At the 2015 New York Musical Theatre Festival it won Best Musical, and Harbridge won Outstanding Lead Actress.

=== Prima Facie ===
Harbridge created the role of Tessa Ensler, a defence barrister, in the premiere production of Suzie Miller's one-woman play Prima Facie, directed by Lee Lewis at Griffin Theatre Company's Stables Theatre in Sydney in May and June 2019. The performance won her the Sydney Theatre Award for Best Female Actor in a Leading Role in a Mainstage Production for 2019. In a five-star review for Time Out, Debbie Zhou called Harbridge's work "a miraculous powerhouse performance". She reprised the role for the production's Melbourne Theatre Company season at Arts Centre Melbourne in 2023, and again for a 2026 return season of the original Australian production at Melbourne's Comedy Theatre and Sydney's Roslyn Packer Theatre. Miller has described Harbridge's performance as "iconic".

=== Amplified: The Exquisite Rock and Rage of Chrissy Amphlett ===
In 2025 Harbridge wrote and starred in Amplified: The Exquisite Rock and Rage of Chrissy Amphlett, a theatrical rock concert about the Divinyls singer Chrissy Amphlett, which she co-created with Glenn Moorhouse and director Sarah Goodes. Drawing on a one-woman show Amphlett had been developing before her death, it premiered at the University of Melbourne in June 2025, and later played Belvoir in January and February 2026, Ballarat, Amphlett's home town of Geelong, Melbourne's Comedy Theatre and the Seymour Centre. The production was warmly received by critics. Limelight praised "Harbridge's expansive talent – as storyteller, singer and indefatigable stage animal", finding her "equally powerful as a stage presence and as a singer, subtly capturing Amphlett's distinctive vocal style". Richard Cotter of Australian Stage called her performance "an exquisite channeling of the charismatic performer", and Alethea Mouhtouris of Theatre Now wrote that Harbridge sang Amphlett's songs "not as a mimic, but as an artist who adores her subject", calling the show "a master class in eulogy". Robyn Roelandts of the Sydney Arts Guide called Harbridge "a unique force of nature" whose Amphlett was "brilliantly and believably executed", ArtsHub's Sharon Willdin described "a diverse performer – a gifted singer, actor and comedian", and Chad Armstrong of Cultural Binge found her vocals "a convincing likeness of Amphlett's tone".

=== Later acting work ===
In 2023 Harbridge played Blanche DuBois in Red Line Productions' staging of A Streetcar Named Desire at the Old Fitz Theatre, winning the Sydney Theatre Award for Best Performance in a Leading Role in an Independent Production. Kirk Dodd of Australian Book Review noted that her Blanche was "so salty and worldly that she drew regular ironic laughs from the audience". She was nominated for the same award category in 2021 for her performance in Stop Girl at Belvoir.

On television, she played Zoe in the Foxtel legal drama The Twelve (2022) and Daz in the ABC series The Messenger (2023). In 2026 she appeared as a guest on the ABC music quiz show Spicks and Specks.

=== My Brilliant Career ===
Harbridge co-wrote the book of My Brilliant Career, a musical adaptation of Miles Franklin's 1901 novel My Brilliant Career, with Dean Bryant, who also wrote the lyrics, and composer Mathew Frank. Bryant and Frank had begun developing the musical before Harbridge joined them as a collaborator. The adaptation reimagines Franklin's heroine, Sybylla Melvyn, as a singer-songwriter. Directed by Anne-Louise Sarks, it premiered at Melbourne Theatre Company's Southbank Theatre in November 2024. Reviewing it for Time Out, Stephen A. Russell gave it five stars and called it "an astounding new musical that's surely destined to travel the world".

The musical won five Green Room Awards in 2025, including Outstanding New Australian Music Theatre Writing for Harbridge, Bryant and Frank. At the 2026 AWGIE Awards the three writers won the Music Theatre award and the $120,000 David Williamson Prize for Excellence in Writing for Australian Theatre. Melbourne Theatre Company brought the production back for a five-week return season in January and February 2026.

=== Other writing and directing ===
She was awarded the 2022 Create NSW Music Theatre Fellowship to develop the musical The Flash Mob, and wrote and directed the cabaret A Model Murder for the 2024 Sydney Festival.

As a director, her work includes the new Australian musical Dubbo Championship Wrestling at the Hayes Theatre, for which she was nominated for Best Director at the Sydney Theatre Awards, and 44 Sex Acts in One Week, which played at the Edinburgh Festival Fringe. She directed the premiere of Phar Lap: The Electro-Swing Musical at the Hayes Theatre in October 2025. Stage Whispers's David Spicer wrote that she had "ridden the production with panache". The production won three Sydney Theatre Awards, including Best Production of a Musical and Best Direction of a Musical for Harbridge.

In May 2025 she was named Sydney Theatre Company's Patrick White Fellow, a year-long position. Harbridge joined Dean Bryant and Mathew Frank as a collaborator on a musical adaptation of Miles Franklin's novel My Brilliant Career, co-writing the musical, with Bryant writing the lyrics and Frank the music. The musical premiered at Melbourne Theatre Company's Southbank Theatre in November 2024. It won five Green Room Awards in 2025, including Outstanding New Australian Music Theatre Writing for Harbridge, Bryant and Frank, and at the 2026 AWGIE Awards the writers won the Music Theatre award and the $120,000 David Williamson Prize for Excellence in Writing for Australian Theatre.

She was awarded the 2022 Create NSW Music Theatre Fellowship to develop the musical The Flash Mob, and wrote and directed the cabaret A Model Murder for the 2024 Sydney Festival.

As a director, her work includes the new Australian musical Dubbo Championship Wrestling at the Hayes Theatre, for which she was nominated for Best Director at the Sydney Theatre Awards, and 44 Sex Acts in One Week, which played at the Edinburgh Festival Fringe. She directed the premiere of Phar Lap: The Electro-Swing Musical at the Hayes Theatre in October 2025. Stage Whispers's David Spicer wrote that she had "ridden the production with panache". The production won three Sydney Theatre Awards, including Best Production of a Musical and Best Direction of a Musical for Harbridge.

In May 2025 she was named Sydney Theatre Company's Patrick White Fellow, a year-long position.

== Awards and nominations ==
Year	Award	Category	Work	Result	Ref.
2015	New York Musical Theatre Festival	Best Musical	Songs for the Fallen	Won	
2015	New York Musical Theatre Festival	Outstanding Lead Actress	Songs for the Fallen	Won	
2019	Sydney Theatre Awards	Best Female Actor in a Leading Role in a Mainstage Production	Prima Facie	Won	
2021	Sydney Theatre Awards	Best Performance in a Leading Role in a Mainstage Production	Stop Girl	Nominated	
2023	Sydney Theatre Awards	Best Performance in a Leading Role in an Independent Production	A Streetcar Named Desire	Won	
2025	Green Room Awards	Outstanding New Australian Music Theatre Writing (with Dean Bryant and Mathew Frank)	My Brilliant Career	Won	
2025	Sydney Theatre Awards	Best Direction of a Musical	Phar Lap: The Electro-Swing Musical	Won	
2026	AWGIE Awards	David Williamson Prize for Excellence in Writing for Australian Theatre (with Dean Bryant and Mathew Frank)	My Brilliant Career	Won	
2026	AWGIE Awards	Music Theatre (with Dean Bryant and Mathew Frank)	My Brilliant Career	Won	
