= Anthea Williams =

Theatre director, film director, and dramaturg

- Born: Christchurch, Canterbury, New Zealand
- Education: University of New South Wales, Victorian College of the Arts
- Known for: Theatre Direction, Film Direction, Dramaturgy
- Notable work: Hir, Since Ali Died, Mother’s Ruin: A Cabaret about Gin, Kill the Messenger, Safety Net
- Awards: Churchill Fellowship – Winston Churchill Memorial Trusts 2017; Best Direction of a Mainstage Production – 2017 Sydney Theatre Awards 2017 Hir – Director
- Website: antheawilliamsdirector.com

Anthea Williams is an Australian and New Zealand theatre director, film director, and dramaturg based in Sydney. She has been directing theatre productions since at least 2008, and made a short film in 2020 titled Safety Net.

== Early life and education ==
Anthea Williams was born and raised in Christchurch, New Zealand.

She is a graduate of the University of New South Wales (Sydney) and the Victorian College of the Arts (Melbourne).

She has had rheumatoid arthritis since she was two. She has written that the way disability is understood affects her every day and believes that directors have a responsibility to people they represent.

== Career ==
Williams was associate director bushfutures at the Bush Theatre in London, England, from 2007 to 2011. She was associate director new work at Belvoir from 2011 to 2017. She has also worked in development at Causeway Films and Screen Australia.

She is a former presenter for the 2RPH program and podcast Activated Arts.

== Recognition and awards ==
Williams was the recipient of a Churchill Fellowship.

For Hir, Williams won the award for Best Direction of a Mainstage Production, and the production won Best Mainstage Production, at the 2017 Sydney Theatre Awards.

Since Ali Died won Best Cabaret Production in the 2018 2018 Sydney Theatre Awards.

== Works ==
Theatre
| Year | Title | Director | Writer | Notes | Ref. |
|---|---|---|---|---|---|
| 2008 | 50 Ways to Leave Your Lover | Yes | No | | |
| 2008 | Two Cigarettes | Yes | No | | |
| 2008 | 50 Ways to Leave Your Lover at Christmas | Yes | No | | |
| 2009 | Sudden Loss of Dignity | Yes | No | | |
| 2010 | The Great British Country Fete | Yes | No | | |
| 2012 | Old Man | Yes | No | | |
| 2013 | Forget Me Not | Yes | No | | |
| 2014 | Cinderella | Yes | No | Also original concept | |
| 2015 | Kill the Messenger | Yes | No | | |
| 2016 | #KillAllMen | Yes | No | | |
| 2017 | Hir | Yes | No | Winner, Best Direction of a Mainstage Production, 2017 Sydney Theatre Awards; Winner, Best Mainstage Production, 2017 Sydney Theatre Awards | |
| 2017 | Mother’s Ruin: A Cabaret about Gin | Yes | Co-writer | Nomination, Best Cabaret Production, 2017 Sydney Theatre Awards | |
| 2018 | Flight Paths | Yes | No | | |
| 2018 | Since Ali Died | Yes | No | Winner, Best Cabaret Production, 2018 Sydney Theatre Awards | |
| 2018 | The Colby Sisters of Pittsburgh, Pennsylvania | Yes | No | | |
| 2018 | The Humans | Yes | No | | |
| 2019 | Fat Musicals | Yes | No | | |
| 2019 | Winyanboga Yuringa | Yes | No | | |
| 2019 | The Pink Hammer | Yes | No | | |
| 2021 | Revolt. She Said. Revolt Again. | Yes | No | | |

Film
| Year | Title | Director | Writer | Notes | Ref. |
|---|---|---|---|---|---|
| 2020 | Safety Net | Yes | No | Official Selection, 2020 Sydney Film Festival; Finalist, New Zealand's Best Short Film, 2020 New Zealand International Film Festival; Official Selection, 2021 Slamdance Film Festival | |
