= Phar Lap (musical) =

- The Electro-Swing Musical
- Music: Steven Kramer
- Lyrics: Steven Kramer
- Book: Steven Kramer
- Premiere: 17 October 2025: Hayes Theatre, Sydney
- Productions: 2025 Sydney; 2027 Australia tour
- Awards: Sydney Theatre Award Best Production Of Musical; Sydney Theatre Award Best Direction Of Musical; Sydney Theatre Award Best Performance Leading Actor in a Musical

Phar Lap: The Electro-Swing Musical is a musical with music, lyrics and book by Steven Kramer. The one-act musical premiered at the Hayes Theatre in Sydney on 17 October 2025. It is a satirical telling of the life of the racehorse Phar Lap, and features electro swing music.

== Premise ==
In a pseudo-coming-of-age story, Phar Lap is bought by American businessman David Davis, on the advice of trainer Harry Telford, based purely on his pedigree. As Telford begins to train Phar Lap to be a racehorse, they begin to experience a father-son-like relationship; Telford teaches Phar Lap how to have autonomy and find his identity, whilst Phar Lap teaches Telford about the importance of caring and having heart.

== Productions ==
A workshop production occurred in 2023, with Joel Granger as Phar Lap leading a cast of seven.

The fully-staged original production premiered at the Hayes Theatre on 17 October 2025. It was directed by Sheridan Harbridge, who was with the musical since early in development, and choreographed by Ellen Simpson. The cast includes Joel Granger as Phar Lap, Justin Smith as Harry Telford, Nat Jobe as David Davis and Phar Lap's alternate jockey, Lincoln Elliott as Nightmarch, Donald Bradman and Andy the bookie, Shay Debney as Jim Pike, Manon Gunderson-Briggs as the announcer, and Amy March as Madame X.

A tour will run around Australia in 2027, including Sydney, Melbourne, Wollongong, Geelong, and Wyong. Joel Granger will reprise his titular role, as will the original creative team.

== Reception ==
The musical was well-received, with critics pointing to the relationship between Phar Lap and trainer Harry Telford as the main throughline of the show. Cassie Tongue of The Guardian highlighted the "witty score", describing the music as "irresistibly bright, catchy, and peppered with laugh-out-loud references", and characterising its "throwback melodies [as] bouncy, fresh and fun".

== Musical numbers ==
- "The Race That Stops the Nation" – Announcer & Company
- "Next Biggest Thing" – Phar Lap
- "Horse Power" – Harry Telford, Phar Lap & Company
- "Ride You" – Jim Pike & Company
- "What are the Odds" – Announcer, Andy & Bookie
- "We'll Stick Together Like Glue" – Harry & Phar Lap
- "National Treasure" – Donald Bradman & Company
- "We'll Reprise Together" – Harry
- "Good As Gold" – Announcer & Company
- "Gimme That Sugar" – Announcer, Nightmarch & Phar Lap
- "What Stops a Nation?" – Phar Lap
- "Race To The Finish" – Company
- "Heart" – Harry and company

== Principal casts ==
Role	Sydney	National tour
Role	2025	2027
Phar Lap	Joel Granger	Joel Granger
Harry Telford	Justin Smith	TBA
Jim Pike	Shay Debney	TBA
Nightmarch	Lincoln Elliott	TBA
Announcer	Manon Gunderson-Briggs	TBA
Madame X	Amy Hack	TBA
David Davis	Nat Jobe	TBA
Swing	Joey Phyland	TBA

== Awards ==
Year	Award	Category	Nominee	Result
2025	Sydney Theatre Awards	Best New Australian Work		Nominated
2025	Sydney Theatre Awards	Best Production of A Musical		Won
2025	Sydney Theatre Awards	Best Direction of A Musical	Sheridan Harbridge	Won
2025	Sydney Theatre Awards	Best Performance in a Leading Role in A Musical	Joel Granger	Won
2025	Sydney Theatre Awards	Best Musical Direction of A Musical	David Gardos	Nominated
2025	Sydney Theatre Awards	Best Choreography of A Musical	Ellen Simpson	Nominated
2025	Sydney Theatre Awards	Best Design of A Musical	Mason Browne (Costume Design)	Nominated
