= Omar Musa =

Australian writer and musician (born 1984)

Omar bin Musa
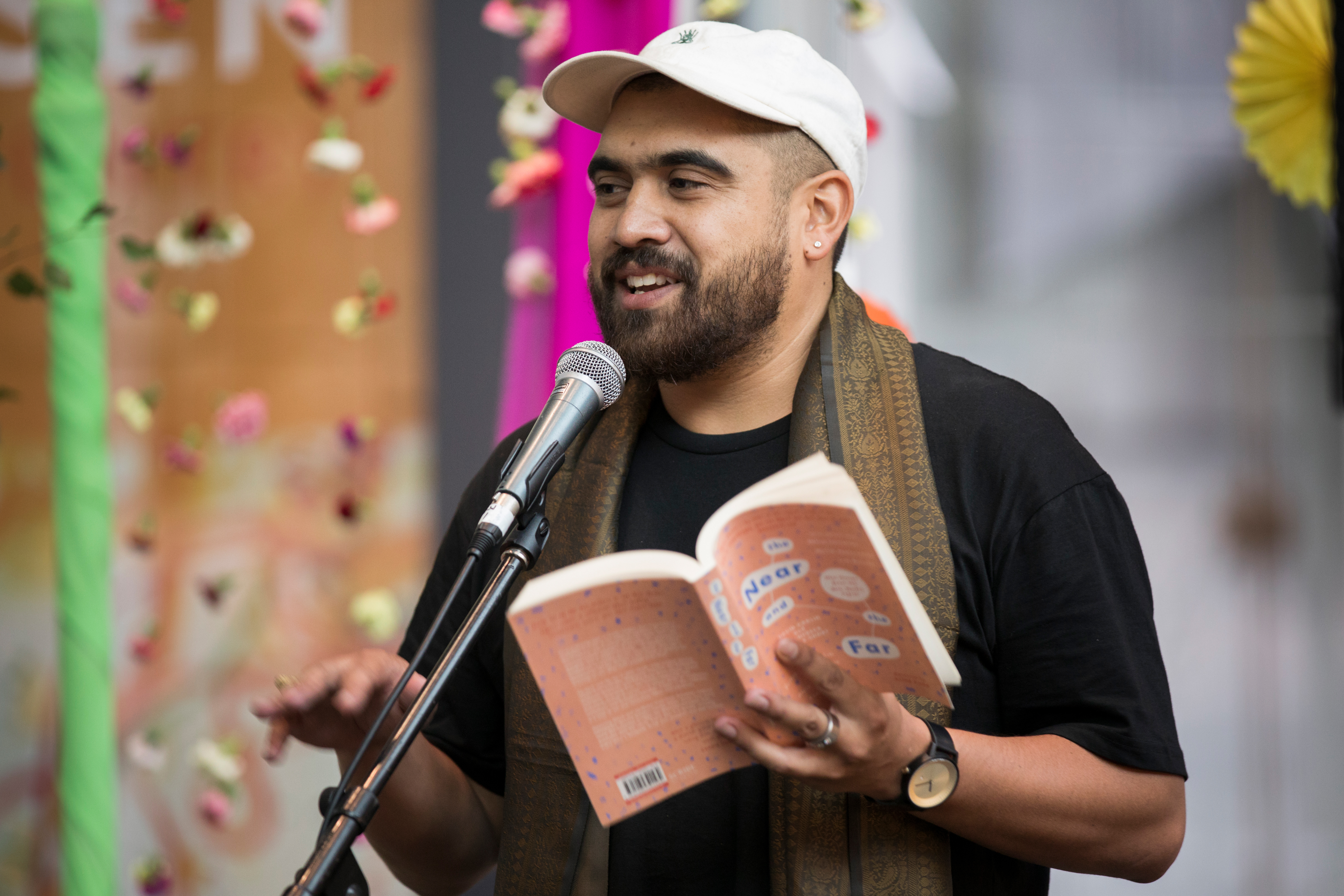
- Omar Musa at Jaipur Literature Festival, Federation Square, Melbourne 2017

Background information
- Born: Omar bin Musa; 1984 (age 41–42); Queanbeyan, New South Wales, Australia
- Genres: hip hop, slam poetry, spoken word
- Occupations: Poet, rapper, novelist, artist
- Instrument: vocals
- Years active: 2002–present
- Awards: Victorian Premier's Prize for Fiction; Miles Franklin Award
- Website: omarmusa.com.au

Omar Musa (born 1984; Omar bin Musa) is a Malaysian-Australian author, poet, rapper, and visual artist. His novel Here Come the Dogs was longlisted for the 2015 Miles Franklin Award and the International Dublin Literary Award. In 2025, he released a second novel, Fierceland, that won the 2026 Miles Franklin Award. He is also known for his 2017 album and 2018 play, both titled Since Ali Died.

== Early life and education ==
Omar Musa was born Omar bin Musa in 1984 in Queanbeyan, New South Wales, Australia. His mother, arts critic and journalist Helen Musa, grew up in Forbes, New South Wales, and is of Irish descent. His father, Musa bin Masran, was a Malaysian poet of Suluk heritage, whose mother was of Kedayan descent from the border areas between Malaysian Borneo and Brunei. They met when Musa bin Masran was cast as Hamlet in the first Malay production of the play. Musa's parents were both strong advocates for artistic expression, and provided him with access to cultural experiences such as concerts, exhibitions, and theatre performances. He has credited this exposure to the arts as a formative influence on his creative development and career.

Musa grew up in a block of flats in Queanbeyan, a satellite city of Canberra. He has described his upbringing as influenced by the cultural diversity of his Macedonian, Korean and Serbian neighbours. He witnessed social challenges within his community, including domestic violence, which he recalled in his 2013 TEDxSydney talk, "Slam Poetry of the Streets". In the talk, he contrasted his childhood with the idealised image of Australia, stating that his experience held "no white sails of the Opera House ... no pavlova."

Musa went to Canberra Grammar School and went on to study at the Australian National University and the University of California, Santa Cruz.

== Career ==
Musa is a poet, hip hop musician, novelist, and visual artist.

=== Writing ===
Musa's career began in poetry, and he gained national attention as a runner-up in the 2007 Australian Poetry Slam. He won the competition the following year, performing at the Sydney Opera House. He also won the Indian Ocean Poetry Slam in 2009. In 2011, he closed the ABC-TV program Q&A with his poem "My Generation". This led to an invitation by Russell Crowe to perform with his band.

Much of Musa's early work explores themes of migration, Australian racism, violence, masculinity and loneliness. It also "celebrated both the grit and beauty of Queanbeyan", where he grew up. His poetry collections include: The Clocks (2009), Millefiori (2012), Parang (2014), and Killernova (2018). Parang, named after the Malay word for "machete," explores themes of his Malaysian heritage, migration, and loss.

In 2014, Musa published his debut novel, Here Come the Dogs, which centres on the lives of three disillusioned young men in small-town Australia. The novel examines issues of race, identity, and the struggles of marginalised youth. The Los Angeles Times called the novel "rousing" and "searing", and said that "with compassion and urgency, Here Come the Dogs excavates the pain of those who struggle to remain part of a ruthless equation that has been determined by others". He later said that he had cut the novel down from 80,000 to 15,000 words, after a talk with his publisher. Here Come the Dogs was nominated for numerous awards, including being longlisted for the Miles Franklin Award and the International Dublin Literary Award. It won the People's Choice Award at the ACT Book of the Year Awards. Musa was named one of the Sydney Morning Herald's Young Novelists of the Year and the novel was short-listed for the New South Wales Premier's Literary Awards in 2015.

In 2018, Musa created a one-man play, Since Ali Died, based on his 2017 album of the same name, that premiered at Griffin Theatre in Sydney, directed by Anthea Williams. The production won Best Cabaret Production in the 2018 2018 Sydney Theatre Awards, and was subsequently performed to critical acclaim at the Melbourne Arts Centre, Sydney Festival, Brisbane Festival, Canberra Theatre, OzAsia Festival in Adelaide, and the Darwin Festival.

Musa's 2025 novel, Fierceland, is set in Sabah. It focuses on two siblings coming to terms with the legacy and death of their palm-oil baron father. It explores topics surrounding illegal logging, indigenous rights, and Borneo rainforests. The novel won the 2026 Victorian Premier's Prize for Fiction, was shortlisted for the fiction category of The Age Book of the Year Awards, and won the Miles Franklin Award.

=== Music ===
Musa has collaborated with various musicians and hip-hop artists, including Kae Tempest, Horrorshow, Kate Miller-Heidke, L-FRESH the Lion, Marc E. Bassy, Lior, Hau Latukefu from Koolism, Joelistics, The Last Kinection, Daniel Merriweather, Akala, and Soweto Kinch. In the US, he was a supporting act for Gil Scott-Heron and performed at the Nuyorican Poets Café in New York City.

After meeting rapper "Mighty Joe" at university in Santa Cruz, California, the pair formed a hip-hop duo called MoneyKat. They had a successful tour in Indonesia, and their track "Nothing is Safe", feat. Candice Monique, was featured on triple j unearthed on 31 May 2011. Mighty Joe is based in Sydney.

In 2017, Musa released Since Ali Died, a full-length hip hop album featuring Sarah Corry, Amali Golden, and Tasman Keith. His 2018 play of the same name, based on the album, was performed at the Griffin Theatre in 2018.

=== Art ===
During a visit to family in Borneo, Musa developed an interest in woodcutting, which led him to incorporate his own woodcut artwork in his fourth collection of poetry, Killernova, adding a visual element to his creative work. He has had several solo exhibitions featuring his woodcut prints.

== Personal life ==
Musa became friends with actor Russell Crowe, who hosted his 30th birthday party on his farm in northern New South Wales.

While writing his 2025 novel Fierceland, Musa embraced sobriety, and also met and married his wife. His best friend died during this period, which added resonance to his writing about grief. He and his wife were honeymooning in the Philippines when he received the news about the Miles Franklin prize.

== Bibliography ==
=== Poetry ===
- The Clocks (2009)
- Parang (2014)
- Millefiori (2017)
- Killernova (2021)

=== Novels ===
- Here Come the Dogs (2014)
- Fierceland (2025)

=== Plays ===
- Since Ali Died (2018)

== Discography ==
=== Studio albums ===
Title	Details
World Goes to Pieces	Released: 2010; Label: Omar Music (OBM002); Format: CD, Digital download, streaming
Since Ali Died	Released: December 2017; Label: Moneykat Music; Format: CD, Digital download, streaming

=== Extended plays ===
Title	Details
The Massive EP	Released: 2009; Label: Omar Music (OBM001); Format: Digital download, streaming
Dead Centre	Released: 2016; Label: Big Village (BV019); Format: CD, Digital download, streaming
