= Company B =

Company B may refer to:

- Company B (band), a dance-pop trio
  - Company B (album), Company B's 1987 debut album
- Company B, former name of Belvoir (theatre company) in Sydney, Australia
- Company B, a modern piece by American choreographer Paul Taylor
