= Hayes Theatre =

- Interactive map of Hayes Theatre
- Address: 19 Greenknowe Ave, Potts Point, Sydney
- Location: New South Wales, Australia
- Coordinates: 33.871°S 151.227°E
- Capacity: 111
- Type: Performing Arts Venue

Website
- hayestheatre.com.au

The Hayes Theatre is a 111-seat theatre specialising in music theatre and cabaret in Potts Point, Sydney, Australia. It is named after the Australian performer Nancye Hayes.

Hayes Theatre Co was established at the former Darlinghurst Theatre after the Darlinghurst Theatre Company moved to the nearby Eternity Playhouse.

Its first production, a revival of Sweet Charity, opened in January 2014. The production transferred to the Sydney Opera House and a national tour, and was nominated for and received multiple Helpmann Awards.

Its ongoing programming includes many world premieres of new Australian musicals and Australian premieres of international musicals, which has gathered significant attention.

Notable performers who have performed at the Hayes include Nancye Hayes, Caroline O'Connor, David Campbell, Verity Hunt-Ballard, Simon Burke, Mitchel Butel, Emma Matthews, Genevieve Lemon, Rowan Witt, Virginia Gay, Tim Draxl, Hellen Dallimore, Bobby Fox, Seann Miley Moore, Trevor Ashley, Marika Aubrey, Blake Bowden, Paul Capsis, Chloe Dallimore, Esther Hannaford, Lucy Maunder, Timomatic, Hayden Tee, Amanda Harrison, Elise McCann, Bert LaBonté, and Tamsin Carroll.

== Productions ==
- 2014 – Sweet Charity, The Drowsy Chaperone, Truth, Beauty and a Picture of You †, Love Bites, Miracle City, Beyond Desire †
- 2015 – Next to Normal, Blood Brothers, Dogfight, Heathers, Master Class, High Society, Rent, Violet
- 2016 – The Fantasticks, Little Shop of Horrors, Rent, The Detective's Handbook †, Xanadu, You're a Good Man, Charlie Brown, Songs for a New World, Side Show, Mack and Mabel
- 2017 – Cabaret, Calamity Jane, Big Fish, Only Heaven Knows, Melba †, Assassins, High Fidelity
- 2018 – Darlinghurst Nights, The View UpStairs, In the Heights, Carmen, Live or Dead †, Gypsy, Cry-Baby, She Loves Me, Evie May †, Aspects of Love
- 2019 – Monty Python's Spamalot, American Psycho, Razorhurst, Catch Me If You Can, Caroline, or Change, H.M.S. Pinafore
- 2020 – The Life of Us †, The Rise and Disguise of Elizabeth R †, The Bridges of Madison County
- 2021 – Young Frankenstein, Well-Behaved Women, Half Time, Merrily We Roll Along
- 2022 – Lizzie, Dubbo Championship Wrestling †, Bonnie & Clyde, Jekyll & Hyde, Godspell, Nice Work If You Can Get It
- 2023 – Urinetown, Gentlemen Prefer Blondes, Metropolis †, The Lucky Country †, City of Angels, Murder for Two, The 25th Annual Putnam County Spelling Bee, A Little Night Music
- 2024 – The Hello Girls, Zombie! †, Tell Me on a Sunday, Ride the Cyclone, Little Women, The Turn of the Screw, Flat Earthers †, Holiday Inn
- 2025 – Ghost Quartet, The Pirates of Penzance, The Producers, Women on the Verge of a Nervous Breakdown, Being Alive †, Once on This Island, Bright Star, Phar Lap †, Merry & Bright †
- 2026 – Barbra: The Greatest Star†, Head Over Heels, A Man of No Importance, Gutenberg!, Dirty Rotten Scoundrels, The Addams Family, The Rink, We Are the Tigers, Silver Tongue †
- 2027 – Peter Allen: Not the Boy Next Door, Lucky Stiff, 1776, House of Rot, A Funny Thing Happened on the Way to the Forum, Swept Away, Next to Normal, Così fan tutte, Be More Chill, Dames at Sea, Flowers for Mrs Harris

† World premiere

Hayes In New Places

Since 2026, some productions by the Hayes Theatre Company has been expanded to different venues or return tours.

- 2026 - The Pirates of Penzance
- 2027 – Phar Lap, Mack The Knife
