= Lee Lewis =

Australian theatre director

Lee Lewis OAM

Artistic Director of Queensland Theatre Company
- In office January 2020 – March 2024
- Preceded by: Sam Strong

Artistic Director of Griffin Theatre Company
- In office 2012 – January 2020

Personal details
- Born: 1970 (age 55–56) Chicago, Illinois, USA
- Education: Columbia University, National Institute of Dramatic Art
- Awards: Helpmann Award

Lee Lewis OAM (born 1970) is an Australian theatre director. She has been artistic director of the Griffin Theatre Company in Sydney and the Queensland Theatre Company in Brisbane, and is the winner of a Helpmann Award.

== Early life and education ==
Lee Lewis was born in 1970 in Chicago, Illinois, United States, of an English father and Zimbabwean mother. Her family emigrated to Australia in 1977, after spending six years in Zimbabwe.

Lewis moved to New York to work in theatre, and trained as an actor at Columbia University while working for a brokerage firm.

Returning to Australia, she completed a Masters of Directing at the National Institute of Dramatic Art in Sydney in 2005.

== Career ==
In 2006 Lewis directed a play by New Zealand writer Matthew J. Saville about the Boer War entitled Kikia te Poa, which was performed at the Old Fitzroy Theatre in Sydney.

She was appointed artistic director of Sydney's Griffin Theatre Company in 2012.

Lewis was appointed artistic director of the Queensland Theatre Company in 2019, succeeding Sam Strong who was her predecessor at Griffin as well. She resigned from Queensland Theatre in March 2024.

In July 2025, Creative Australia announced funding from the new Creative Futures Fund for the production of Suzie Miller's new play Strong Is the New Pretty, to be delivered by Brisbane Festival in partnership with Sydney Theatre Company and Trish Wadley Productions, directed by Lewis.

== Productions ==
- Our Town (2004)
- Vicious Streaks (2004)
- The Drowned World (2005)
- Shopping and F***ing (2006)
- The Nightwatchman (2007)
- Love Lies Bleeding (2007)
- 2000 Feet Away (2007)
- Stoning Mary (2008)
- The Call (2009)
- That Face (2010)
- Honour (2010)
- Twelfth Night (2010)
- Silent Disco (2011)
- The Winter's Tale (2011)
- A Hoax (2012)
- The School for Wives (2012)
- This Heaven (2013)
- The Bull, the Moon and the Coronet of Stars (2013)
- Rupert (2013)
- The Serpents Table (2014)
- Eight Gigabytes of Hardcore Pornography (2014)
- Emerald City (2014)
- Masquerade (2015)
- The Bleeding Tree (2015)
- A Rabbit for Kim Jong-il (2015)
- Replay (2016)
- The Literati (2016)
- Gloria (2016)
- Smurf in Wanderland (2017)
- Hay Fever (2017)
- Darlinghurst Nights (2018)
- The Almighty Sometimes (2018)
- The Misanthrope (2018)
- Mary Stuart (2019)
- Prima Facie (2019)
- Splinter (2019)
- First Love is the Revolution (2019)
- Family Values (2020)
- Return to the Dirt (2021)
- Bernhardt / Hamlet (2022)
- Tiny Beautiful Things (2024)
- Gaslight (2024)
- How to plot a hit in two days (2025)
- Shirley Valentine (2025)
- Art (2026)

== Awards ==
- 2016: Helpmann Award for Best Direction of a Play for Griffin's production of The Bleeding Tree
- 2024: Honorary Medal of the Order of Australia in the 2024 King's Birthday Honours, for service to the performing arts as a theatre director.
