= Playhouse Theatre (Perth) =

Former theatre in Perth, Western Australia

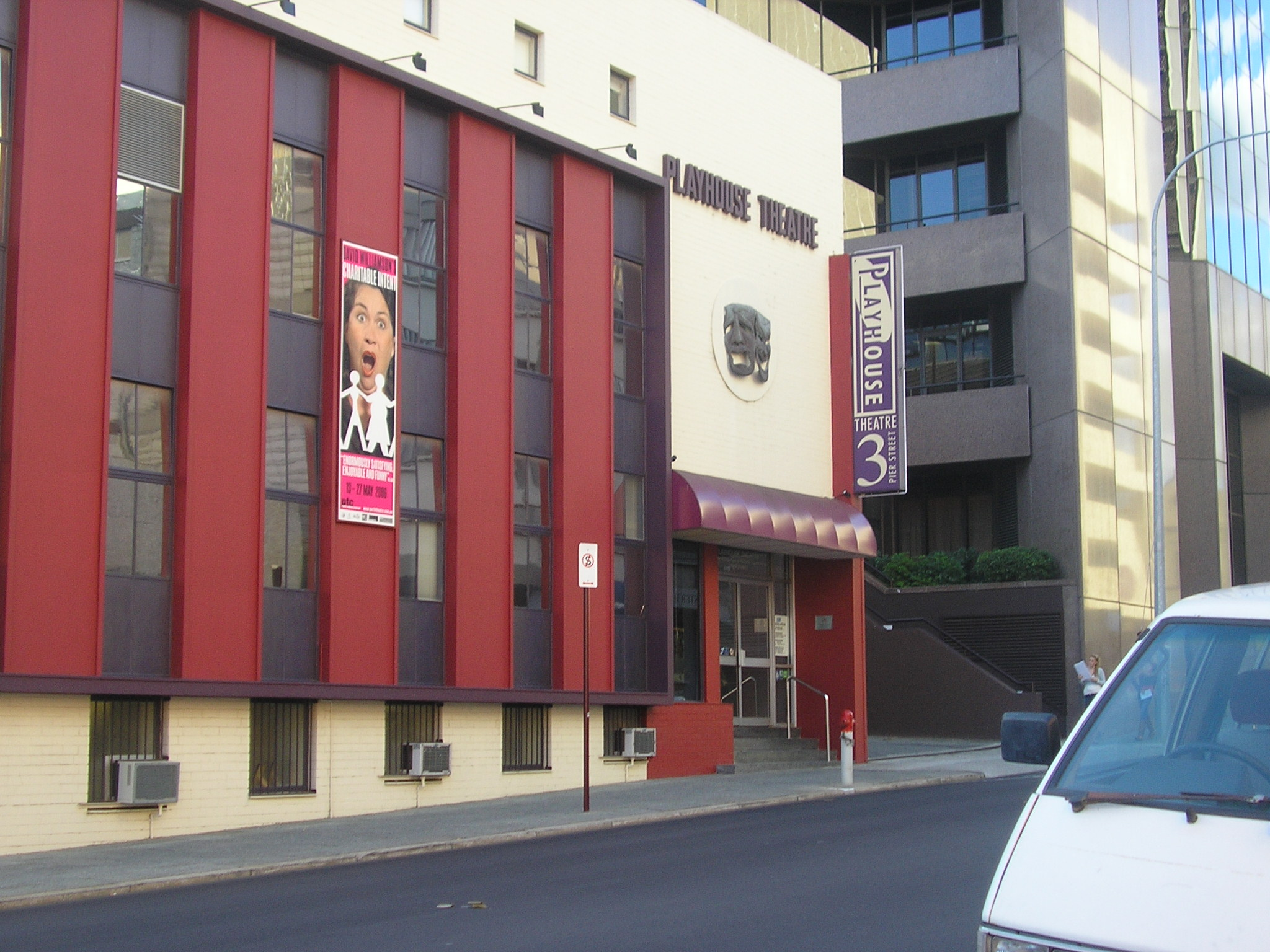
- Playhouse Theatre facade, Pier Street, Perth
- Interactive map of the Playhouse Theatre area

General information
- Type: Theatre
- Location: 3 Pier Street, Perth, Western Australia, Australia
- Coordinates: 31.9559°S 115.8617°E
- Completed: 1956
- Inaugurated: 22 August 1956
- Demolished: October 2012
- Cost: £A 65,000
- Client: National Theatre Company
- Owner: Diocese of Perth
- Landlord: Perth Theatre Trust

Design and construction
- Architecture firm: Krantz & Sheldon

Website
- The Playhouse Theatre

The Playhouse Theatre was a theatre in central Perth, Western Australia. It was purpose-built for live theatre in 1956 and remained one of the city's principal venues for performing arts for over half a century until replaced by the State Theatre Centre of Western Australia in January 2011. It was home to the National Theatre Company from its establishment until 1984, and then to its successor, the Western Australian Theatre Company, until its disbandment in 1990.

The theatre was demolished in October 2012 as part of a redevelopment of Cathedral Square.

== History ==
=== Background ===
On 11 December 1919 the Repertory Club was established in Perth, with about forty members. Its earliest productions were The Amazons and Lady Windermere's Fan, staged in 1920. The Repertory Club initially worked out of a basement room at the Palace Hotel, then a room in Commerce Buildings, King Street, before moving into a cottage in Pier Street from 1921 to 1932. Their next move was to the old composing room of the Western Australian Newspaper Company in St George's Terrace, with their first performance there on 3 August 1933. The club organised a range of entertainments apart from plays, and usually had two productions in rehearsal while one was being staged. Its membership was restricted to 1,000 members and most shows were sold out before opening night, so advertising was seldom necessary.

The need for the Playhouse arose as Perth's main theatre, His Majesty's Theatre was considered too large to provide a feasible venue for locally produced live-theatre productions, and had been functioning principally as a cinema since the early 1940s. In the mid-1950s the board and members of the Repertory Club commenced fundraising for the construction of a smaller purpose-built theatre to stage their productions.

=== Founding ===
The theatre was constructed adjacent to St George's Cathedral on Pier Street land owned by the Anglican Church, the former site of the Church of England Deanery tennis court. The building was designed by the local architectural firm of Sheldon & Krantz and constructed at a cost of £A 65,000. The main lobby contained a mural by Iwan Iwanoff, a local brutalist architect. The theatre was formally opened on 22 August 1956 to a capacity audience of 700, with the opening production of John Patrick's 1953 Pulitzer Prize-winning play The Teahouse of the August Moon.

With the opening of the Playhouse, the Repertory Club became a fully professional theatre company, the National Theatre Company, after amalgamation with the Company of Four.

=== Actors and crew ===
Notable actor Edgar Metcalfe was a regular performer on stage and also served three terms as artistic director between 1963–1984. A rare period of box-office success was enjoyed by the theatre from 1978–1981 when Stephen Barry was artistic director of the National Theatre at the Playhouse. He arranged outstanding guest performances by international celebrities Warren Mitchell, Honor Blackman, Robyn Nevin, Timothy West, Tim Brooke-Taylor and Judy Davis, among others. Barry commissioned Dorothy Hewett's play, The Man from Muckinupin, (Note: The spelling 'Mukinupin' was adopted later.) for the State's sesquicentennial (150th) anniversary celebrations in 1979 (WAY '79), despite hostile resistance from then state premier Charles Court.

However, soon after Barry's departure, the company lost its audience appeal. Despite an extensive renovation in 1982, with reduction of seating capacity, the National Theatre was liquidated in February 1984 and the building and company taken over by the Perth Theatre Trust.

The theatre company continued to operate under the names Threshold Theatre Company and then XYZ Theatre Company for a short while, in May 1985 becoming the Western Australian Theatre Company. This name was retained until they dissolved in July 1990.

The Playhouse Theatre remained one of the city's principal venues for performing arts until replaced by the State Theatre Centre of Western Australia in January 2011. It was demolished in October 2012 as part of a redevelopment of Cathedral Square.

== Facilities ==
A traditional proscenium arch theatre with a raked auditorium, the Playhouse had bar and conference facilities, and hosted productions from the annual Perth International Arts Festival. It was the performance and administrative home of the Perth Theatre Company for sixteen years, until the company's relocation to the new State Theatre Centre of Western Australia in January 2011. The Company's last production was of David Williamson's The Removalists in April 2010. Demolition was originally planned for 2010 but postponed when the Perth Theatre Trust sought to extend its lease due to delays to the construction of the State Theatre. The final production was the pantomime production of Puss in Boots in December 2010, produced by the MS Society of WA.

== See also ==
- Regal Theatre, Perth
