= Village Roadshow Studios =

Film studios located in Oxenford, Gold Coast, Queensland, Australia

General information
- Type: Film and television studios
- Location: Gold Coast, Australia, Entertainment Road
- Coordinates: 27.9110274°S 153.3112476°E
- Inaugurated: 1991; 35 years ago
- Owner: Village Roadshow

Website
- villageroadshowstudios.com.au

Village Roadshow Studios are a set of film studios located in Oxenford, a suburb of the Gold Coast in Queensland, Australia. The studios are owned by Village Roadshow and consist of nine sound stages and a range of other production facilities. The studio commenced in June 1991 and is one of four film studios in Australia, the others being Disney Studios Australia in Sydney, Docklands Studios Melbourne, and Perth Film Studios in Perth.

The studios have been home to many feature films, telemovies, TV series and miniseries. Some feature film productions include Aquaman, San Andreas, The Chronicles of Narnia: The Voyage of the Dawn Treader, Scooby-Doo, House of Wax, Ghost Ship, and Thor: Ragnarok. TV productions have included H_{2}O: Just Add Water, Terra Nova, BeastMaster and The Lost World series.

== History ==
Village Roadshow Studios opened in 1986 and was commissioned by Dino De Laurentiis for De Laurentiis Entertainment Limited (DEL). Village Roadshow purchased DEL and took over the facility in 1988. From July 1988, the studios were occupied producing television shows for Paramount Television: Mission: Impossible for the American Broadcasting Company and Dolphin Bay for CBS. In November 1988, Warner Bros. acquired a 50% share of the studio and jointly proposed with Village Roadshow to build Warner Bros. Movie World theme park, which opened adjacent to the studio in 1991. Despite their physical proximity and operational links, the studios and theme park are separate entities. The studio was renamed Warner/Village Roadshow Studio.

The theme park, and the studios' management have no involvement with productions and, as such, do not recommend cast, crew or extras. This is done independently by the production. However, experienced Warner Bros. Movie World staff are often involved in productions filmed at the studios. The studios are not open to the general public and as the productions are independently owned, permission to go on-set can only be obtained from the production itself.

In June 2004, a fire in Sound Stage 8, during the production of House of Wax, destroyed the sound stage.

== Facility ==
The facility consists of nine sound stages, three water tanks (two outdoor and one indoor; one of which is the largest purpose built film water tank in Australia), 10 production areas, five construction workshops, onsite support facilities, two wardrobe and laundry facilities, accounting services, lock ups, screening and editing, preview theatrette, visual effects studio, film processing, post production, travel and freight services, and much more.

In addition to producing a variety of television shows and films, the studios have also been used by the adjacent Warner Bros. Movie World theme park. When the two facilities opened in 1991, a Studio Tour was run from Warner Bros. Movie World throughout the production areas of the Village Roadshow Studios before returning to the Movie Magic Special Effects Show. In 2011, both Sound Stage 1 and 2 were utilised for the theme park's annual halloween event, Fright Nights. The Saw and Zombie Apocalypse mazes were housed in these studios throughout October.

In 2018, some sound stages were used for the 2018 Commonwealth Games and played host to sports such as boxing and table tennis. Temporary spectator seating was installed for a total of 6,200 people for the two sports.

== Productions ==
=== Films ===
Year	Title	Ref.
1989	The Delinquents	
1990	Blood Oath (Prisoners of the Sun)	
1992	Hurricane Smith	
1993	Fortress	
1994	Escape from Absolom (No Escape)	
1994	Street Fighter	
1995	Mighty Morphin Power Rangers: The Movie	
1996	The Phantom	
1999	Chameleon II: Death Match	
1999	Komodo	
1999	Chameleon 3: Dark Angel	
2000	Pitch Black	
2001	Crocodile Dundee in Los Angeles	
2002	Scooby-Doo	
2002	Ghost Ship	
2003	Darkness Falls	
2003	Tempted (Returning Lily)	
2003	Peter Pan	
2005	House of Wax	
2005	The Great Raid	
2006	Aquamarine	
2006	See No Evil	
2006	Superman Returns	
2006	The Marine	
2007	The Condemned	
2008	The Ruins	
2008	Fool's Gold	
2008	Nim's Island	
2009	Beauty and the Beast	
2009	Triangle	
2009	Daybreakers	
2010	The Chronicles of Narnia: The Voyage of the Dawn Treader	
2011	Sanctum	
2012	Bait 3D	
2012	Bad Karma	
2012	Iron Sky	
2012	Return to Nim's Island	
2013	The Railway Man	
2014	My Mistress	
2014	The Inbetweeners 2	
2014	Unbroken	
2015	The Fear of Darkness	
2015	San Andreas	
2015	StalkHer	
2016	The Shallows	
2017	Kong: Skull Island	
2017	Jungle	
2017	Pirates of the Caribbean: Dead Men Tell No Tales	
2017	Thor: Ragnarok	
2018	Guardians of the Tomb	
2018	Aquaman	
2019	Danger Close: The Battle of Long Tan	
2019	Dora and the Lost City of Gold	
2021	Godzilla vs. Kong	
2022	Elvis	
2022	Thirteen Lives	
2022	Ticket to Paradise	
2023	True Spirit	
2024	Godzilla x Kong: The New Empire	
2024	How to Make Gravy	
2025	Eden	
2025	Anaconda	
2026	Balls Up	
2026	The Bluff	
2026	The Get Out (Bear Country)	
2026	Mortal Kombat II	
2026	The Devil's Mouth	
2026	Spa Weekend	
2027	Godzilla x Kong: Supernova	
2027	Gundam	
2027	Voltron	
TBA	Subversion	
TBA	The Mosquito Bowl	
TBA	Untitled Mike Thornton biopic film	

=== TV series ===
Year	Title	Ref.
1988–1990	Mission: Impossible	
1989	Dolphin Cove	
1993–1994	Paradise Beach	
1995–2000	Flipper	
1995–1996	Space: Above and Beyond	
1996	Pacific Drive	
1997	20,000 Leagues Under the Sea	
1998–1999	Dumb Bunnies	
1999–2002	Beastmaster	
1999–2002	The Lost World	
2006–2010	H_{2}O: Just Add Water	
2007	Animalia	
2008	Sea Patrol (Season 2)	
2011	Terra Nova	
2013	Mako: Island of Secrets (Season 3)	
2019	Reef Break	
2021	Young Rock	
2022	Irreverent	
2022	Rock Island Mysteries	
2022	The Wilds (Season 2)	
2024	Apples Never Fall	
2024	Nautilus	
2026	Monarch: Legacy of Monsters	
2026	Wonka's The Golden Ticket	

== Clients ==
- ABC Productions
- Alliance Atlantis
- Blue Sky Pictures
- Cappadocia Co Ltd
- Carlton America
- CBS Productions
- Disney Channel
- DreamWorks
- Fox Television
- Hartbreak Films
- HBO
- Konigsberg Smith Company
- London Weekend Television
- MGM Television
- Miramax Films
- NBC Productions
- Paramount Pictures
- Paramount Network Television
- Pearson Television
- Phoenix Film
- Revolution Studios
- RTL Television
- Samuel Goldwyn Company
- Telecine
- Viacom
- Von Zerneck/Sertner Productions
- Walden Media
- Walt Disney Features
- Walt Disney Television
- Warner Bros. Pictures
- Warner Bros. Television Studios
- Warner Independent Pictures
- Wilshire Court Productions
- WWE Films
- Marvel Films

== See also ==
- Screen Queensland Studios
- Sports on the Gold Coast, Queensland
- Venues of the 2018 Commonwealth Games
