= His Majesty's Theatre, Perth =

Theatre in Perth, Western Australia

His Majesty's Theatre
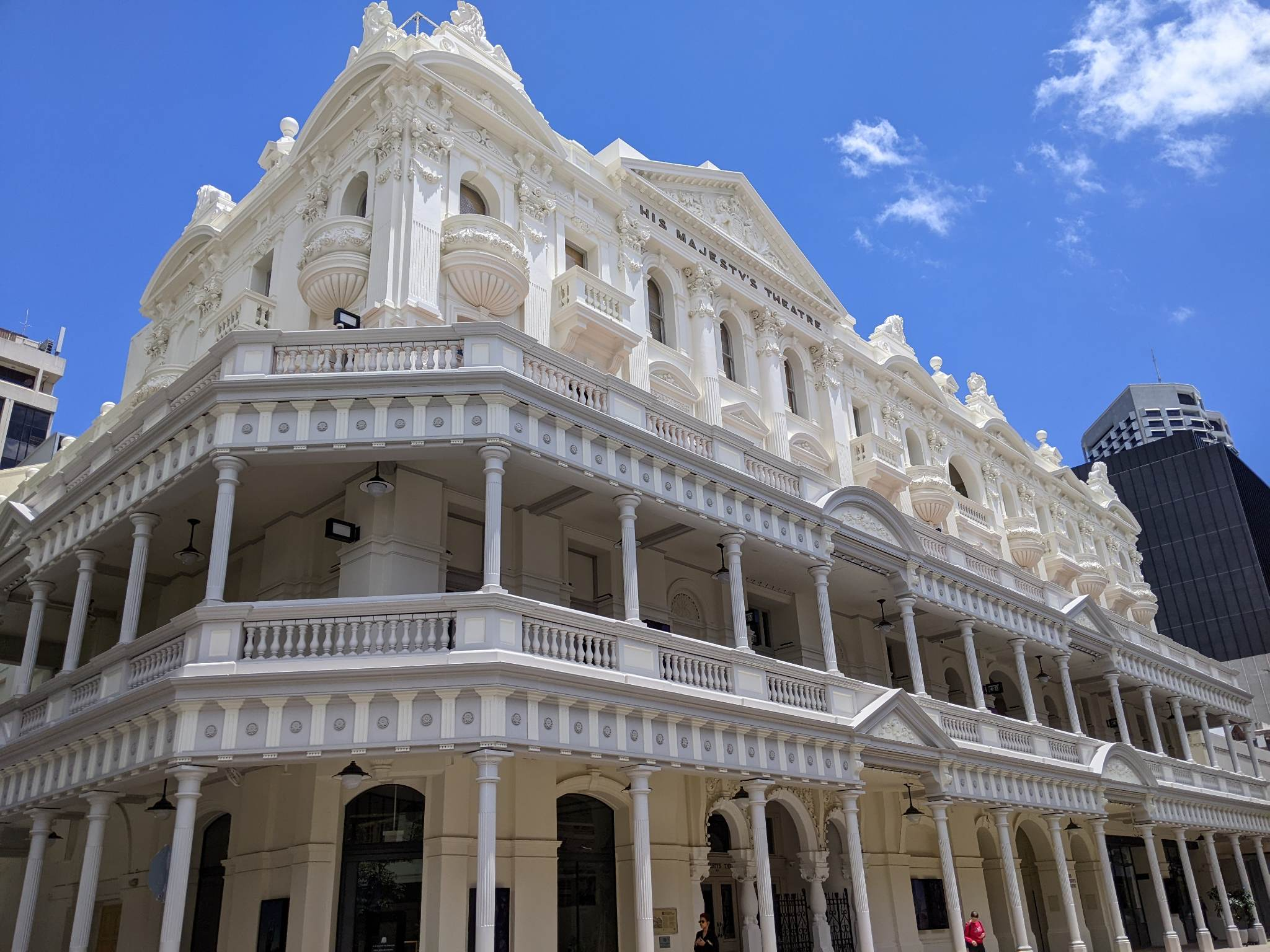
- The theatre in 2022
- Interactive map of His Majesty's Theatre
- Address: 825 Hay Street; Perth; Australia
- Coordinates: 31°57′11″S 115°51′16″E
- Owner: Government of Western Australia
- Capacity: 1,263

Construction
- Opened: 24 December 1904
- Architect: William G. Wolfe

Website
- www.artsculturetrust.wa.gov.au/venues/his-majestys-theatre/

Western Australia Heritage Register
- Type: State Registered Place
- Designated: 16 December 1994
- Reference no.: 2006

His Majesty's Theatre is an Edwardian Baroque theatre in Perth, Western Australia. Constructed from 1902 to 1904 during a period of great growth for the town, the theatre is located on the corner of Hay Street and King Street in Perth's central business district.

At the time the theatre was opened, it was the largest theatre in Australia, and had seating for over 2,500 people. It is also thought to be the first reinforced concrete building constructed in Perth.

Over its life, the theatre has hosted large-scale musicals, ballet, opera, Shakespearean plays and many other events. It has been renovated numerous times, most notably in the late 1970s when the state government purchased it and performed an ornamental restoration whilst modernising the facilities provided. Since that time, it has been the home of the West Australian Ballet and West Australian Opera companies, both of which perform regularly.

The importance of His Majesty's Theatre to the cultural fabric of Western Australia has been recognised by its inclusion on the State Register of Heritage Places and the Register of the National Estate. It has also been named a "State Heritage Icon", and is believed to be the only remaining working Edwardian theatre in Australia.

== Construction ==
At the turn of the 20th century, Perth was experiencing a period of high growth as a result of the Western Australian gold rush. The prosperity which resulted from this boom led to the construction of increasingly opulent baroque buildings. Local politician Thomas Molloy had commissioned the Metropole Hotel in 1896 and adjoining 1200-seat Theatre Royal in 1897, which included the first fully equipped theatre in the growing town. Soon after the completion of that complex, Molloy asked the same architect, William G. Wolf, to design an integrated theatre and hotel complex to be named His Majesty's Theatre and Hotel in honour of the recently crowned King Edward VII. The site selected for this new theatre was the corner of King Street and Hay Street, which in 1896 had been home to "Ye Olde Englishe Faire". In June 1902, Molloy applied to the Perth Licensing Court for planning permission to construct the theatre, and when he finally received permission, he promised completion within a year.

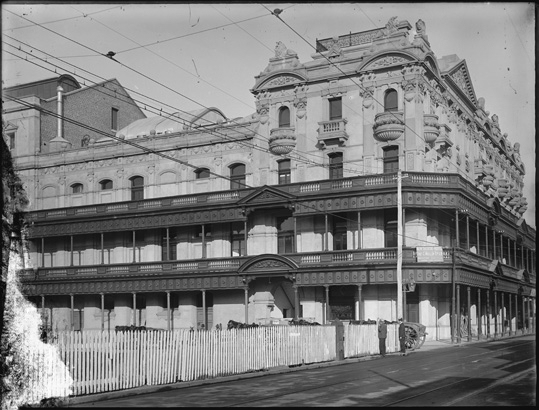
His Majesty's Theatre in the late stages of construction in 1904, showing the original balconies which lined the street frontages

A call for tenders to construct the complex was put out, and the winning tender was by Friederich Liebe who had previously constructed the Bulgarian Houses of Parliament in Sofia and worked on the Budapest Opera House. The tender price was £A 46,000, equivalent to A$7.4 million in 2022, of which £A 43,000 was the cost of the building alone. The construction contract between Molloy and Liebe was signed in November 1902, and Heinrich Schmidt was appointed as foreman for Liebe. Deep excavation of the site for the building's foundations and basement started almost immediately.

During construction, questions were publicly raised about the stability of the building's foundations in light of the water table on the site and the presence of a subterranean stream. Liebe conferred with the architect and engineers before developing a revised design which featured drains to divert running water. Liebe presented the modified plans to Molloy and proceeded with them, assuming that he had the consent of Molloy. Construction progressed, and the building was completed on schedule. When the time finally came for Molloy to pay Liebe for the construction, a dispute arose as to who should be liable for the extra £A 17,000 (equivalent to A$3 million in 2022) incurred in remedying the structural defect. Molloy was reputed to be one of the most litigious businessmen in Perth, and refused to pay higher than the original agreed price, on the basis that the contract required his written approval for extra work to be carried out. Liebe pursued him through the courts all the way to the High Court and Privy Council. The Privy Council eventually ruled in favour of Liebe, however the legal costs he had incurred were exorbitant.

After resolving some last-minute objections by the Central Board of Health to the building's fire safety, the theatre was officially opened at 8pm on Christmas Eve in 1904 by Sylvia Forrest in the presence of her uncle, former premier John Forrest. Opening night saw "Pollard's Adult Opera Company" performing The Forty Thieves, however the choice of opening date was an unfortunate one and the opening night was not a sell-out.

=== Architecture ===
At the time of its opening, His Majesty's Theatre was the largest theatre in Australia, and also featured the country's largest stage and highest fly tower. The complex was constructed with reinforced concrete, and was the first reinforced concrete building in Perth and, possibly, in Australia. The structure is 4-storeys tall, and its features were influenced by 19th-century English and European theatres. It has been described as "a fine example" of Federation Free Classical or Edwardian Baroque architecture.

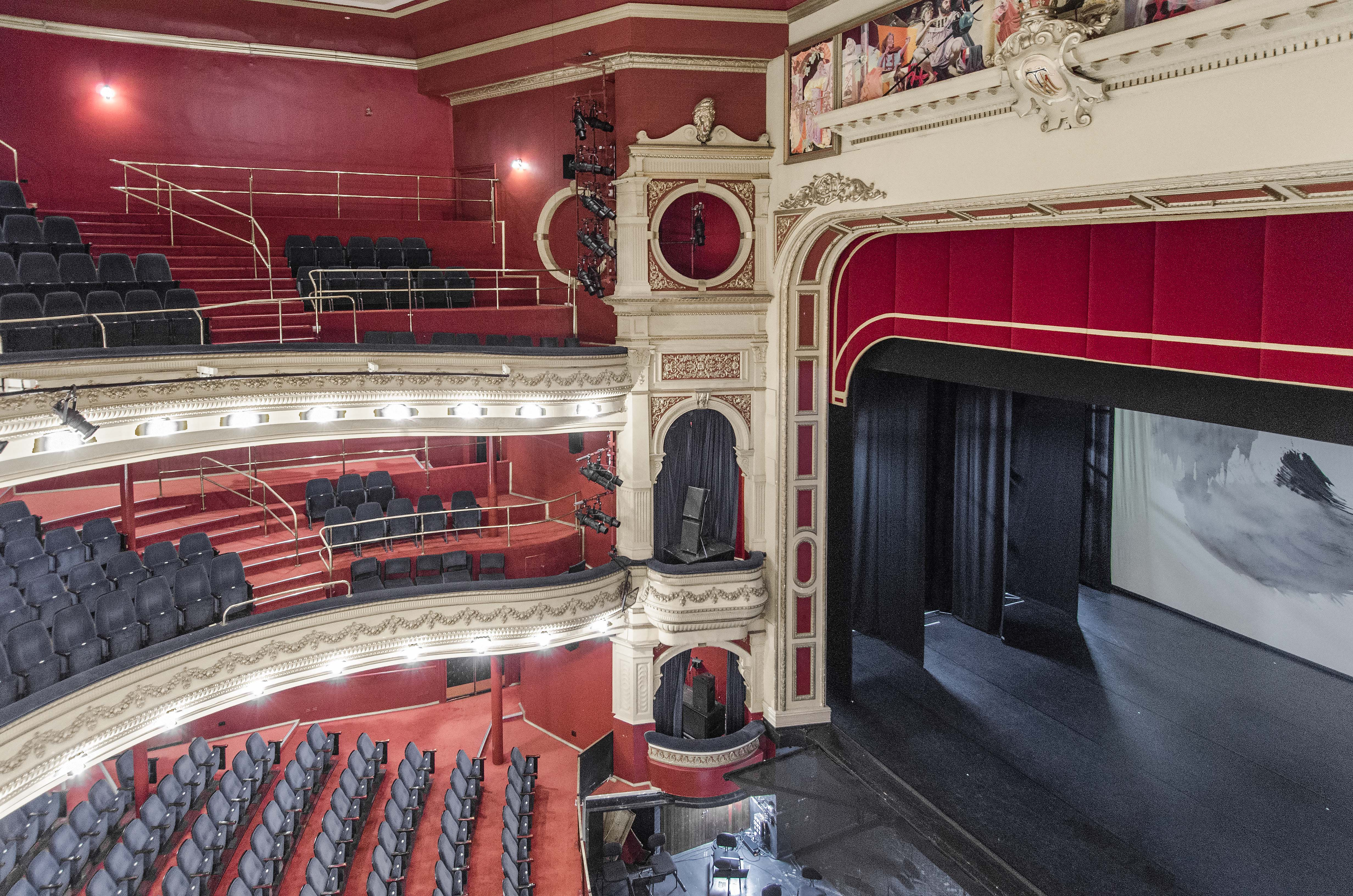
view of the auditorium from the gallery

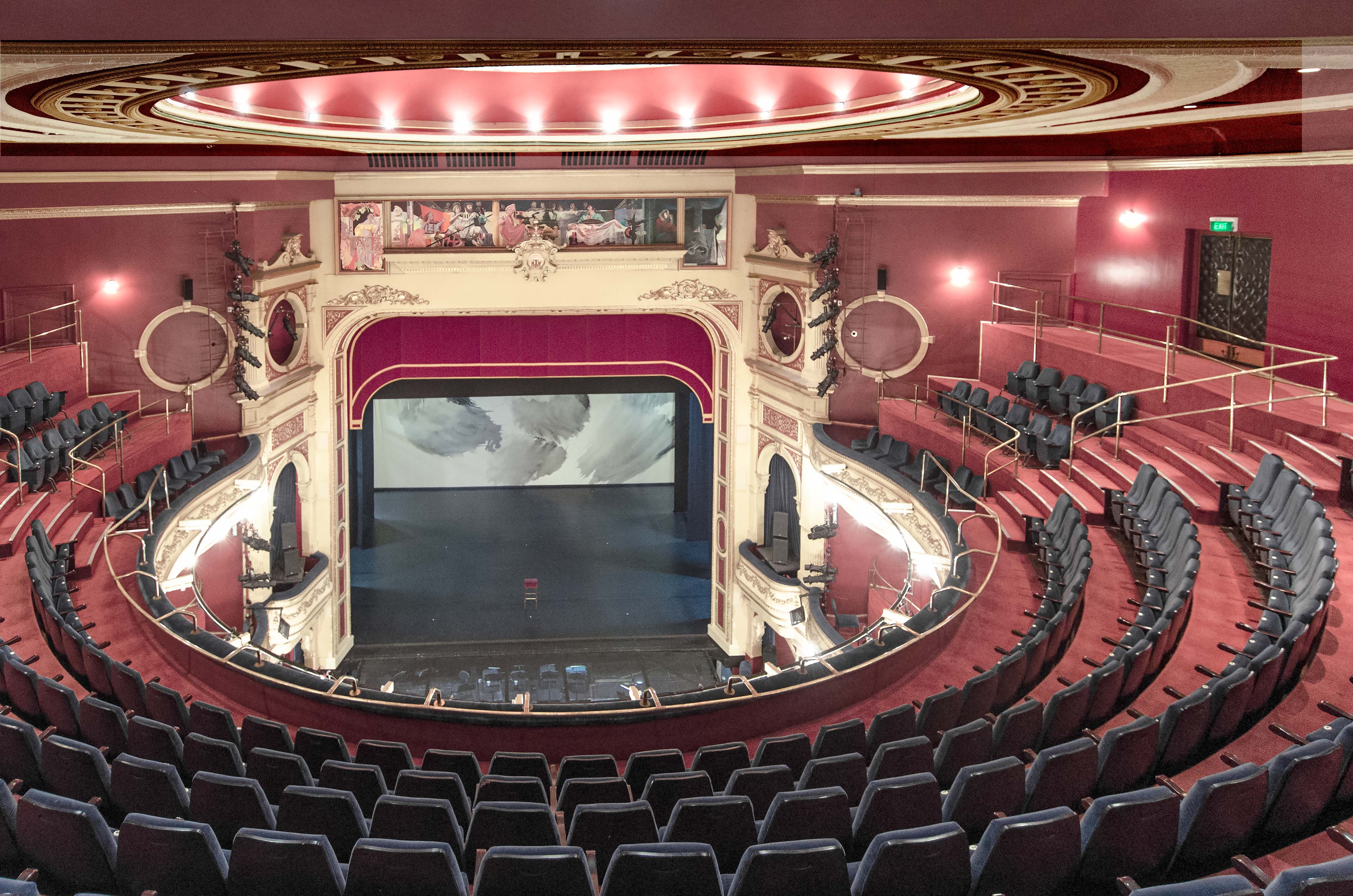
view of the stage from the upper gallery

The building as designed by Wolfe was grander than Molloy's Theatre Royal complex, and featured a 65-room hotel separated from the theatre by internal iron doors. The hotel had billiard rooms, parlours and six bars to serve the patrons of the theatre. The building used 272 tonnes (600,000 lb) of iron and steel, 3.75 million locally made bricks, imported marble, Minton tiles and Castlemaine slate. An electric lift led to the roof, where an observation platform had panoramic views over the town.

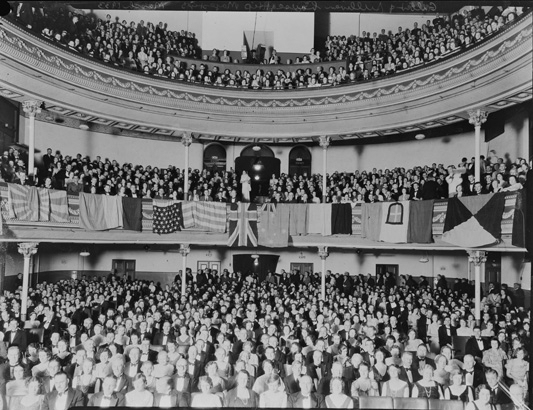
A 1933 audience in the theatre

The auditorium contained a proscenium arch, with a raked stage 20 by 23 metres (66 by 75 ft) in size. The auditorium measured 23 by 21 metres (75 by 69 ft), and its original capacity was 2584 people in three tiers. The interior of the theatre was a typical Edwardian horseshoe-shape to bring the audience closer to the performers. It featured stalls (seating 974), a dress circle (seating 540), an upper gallery (seating 1,074) and private boxes.

The theatre incorporated several cooling features. Four small waterfalls were located on either side of the proscenium arch, intended to cool the audience in tandem with electric fans and a retractable dome in the ceiling. The dome was split down the middle, with each half sliding to either side to open. The dome was decorated in imitation of an umbrella, with panels of gold and silver with scrollwork embellishment. The artificial waterfalls were removed early in the life of the theatre.

The exterior of the theatre was originally lined with two-level verandah balconies, which provided relief to the imposing walls. These were removed in 1947-48, because authorities considered that the proximity of the supporting pillars to the road constituted a traffic hazard. As a result, there is a disparity between the ornamentation at the top of the building's facade and the lower three storeys, which were previously obscured by the balconies.

== Subsequent history and renovation ==
Over its first 70 years of life, His Majesty's played host to the traditional Shakespearean plays, opera, political rallies, boxing matches and movie screenings. It was particularly noted for its excellent acoustics. During World War II, the theatre functioned chiefly as a cinema due to travel restrictions on touring companies.

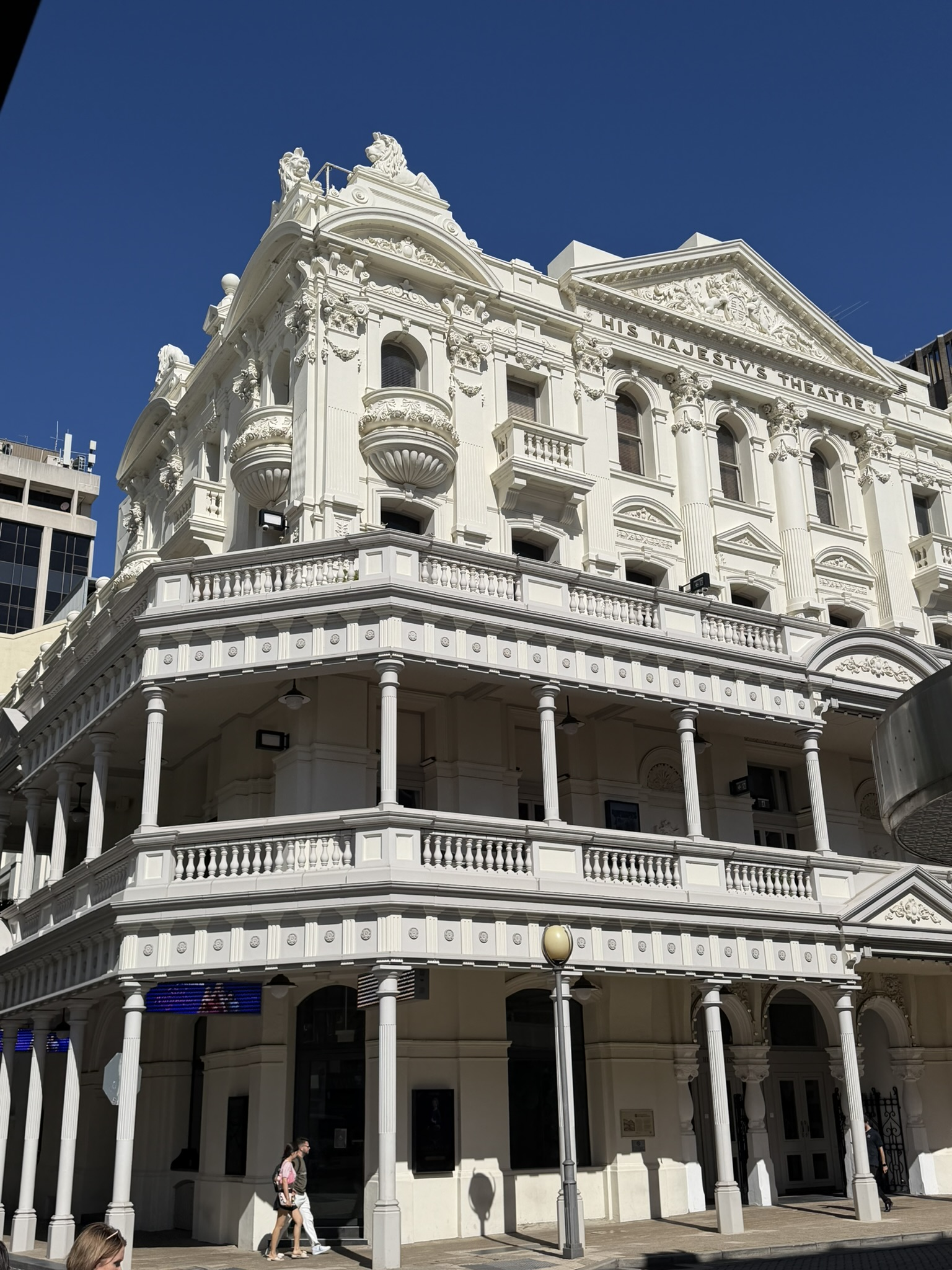
The theatre in 2026

Original proprietor Thomas Molloy leased the theatre to others, including Ben and John Fuller, and local producer Anita Fitzgerald. Another lessee of the theatre, J. C. Williamson Ltd, is said to have made His Majesty's Theatre the Perth home of musical theatre. The theatre was renovated in 1912 at a cost of £A 9,000, and again in 1948 at a cost of £A 11,000. The latter renovation included new backstage electrical fittings and may also have been the time the verandah balconies were removed from the street frontage of the theatre. In 1952, the theatre was leased by the Edgley family and used for "Russian spectaculars". The theatre was redecorated for Edgley and Dawe in 1960, this time at a cost of £A 7,000. Edgley went on to purchase His Majesty's in 1969. After the Perth Entertainment Centre was completed in 1974, the Edgley productions shifted there, and the newly completed Perth Concert Hall was also favoured as a performance venue due to outdated equipment and general disrepair at His Majesty's. The theatre was sold in 1976 to Norman Rydge.

=== 1970s renovation ===
Following several years with an uncertain future and a public campaign to save it, in 1977 the theatre was bought by the Government of Western Australia. Adhering to an April 1974 election promise to retain and restore the theatre in conjunction with a new Art Gallery and Cultural Centre, in 1977 the Charles Court Coalition Government undertook a $10.5 million refurbishment. The final performance in the theatre before closing for renovation was the Gilbert and Sullivan Society's 25th anniversary production of Iolanthe. The refurbishment took three years and was overseen by architects Hill and Parkinson.

The refurbishment saw significant structural changes made to the hotel/theatre complex. Initially, it was suggested that the theatre be largely remodelled to a two-tier concert hall design. However, architect Peter S. Parkinson resisted this push to fundamentally alter the design of the theatre and a sympathetic restoration was instead favoured. Within the auditorium, it was found that the reinforced concrete floor of the stalls was substandard and was completely replaced. Additionally, on one of the upper levels a wall was discovered which was not supported by a beam in accordance with the building plans. The much-maligned supporting pillars were shifted back to improve sight-lines for the audience. The raked stage was replaced with a new flat one, and the proscenium arch widened by 2 metres (6.6 ft) and decorated with plaster mouldings of the original arch. The pressed-metal ceiling was also replaced with a plaster-moulded copy. The sliding dome in the roof was permanently sealed, and redecorated to match its original design from 1904. The orchestra pit was also expanded and new lighting and counterweights installed.

The hotel portion of the complex was separated from the theatre, and renovated to provide a home for the resident West Australian Opera and West Australian Ballet, as well as backstage facilities for touring companies. A separate building was constructed to the rear of the theatre to house new dressing and rehearsal rooms, as well as a new air conditioning system.

The theatre's grand marble staircase was relocated to provide a larger foyer. It had its marble treads replaced but retains the original balustrade. The former Sportsman's Bar of the hotel was converted to function as the theatre's new box office, and the side entrance from King Street was made an emergency exit. Soundproofing was also installed within the building's walls to reduce traffic noise.

During the renovation there was debate about the best way to manage the theatre in the future. The favoured option was to establish a trust to operate it, which could focus on best serving the arts rather than worrying about commercial viability of productions. However, on 8 February 1979, Premier Court announced that His Majesty's would be run by TVW Enterprises Ltd, the owner of the rival Perth Entertainment Centre. This led to public outcry over potential conflicts of interest, and in June 1979 TVW declined to manage the theatre. The Perth Theatre Trust was instead created, and it took over the running of the theatre. His Majesty's Theatre finally reopened on 28 May 1980, with a reduced seating capacity of 1250.

His Majesty's Theatre has long been recognised as an important piece of Western Australia's history: in 1978 it was entered onto the Register of the National Estate. On 8 April 1994, it was included as an interim entry on the Western Australian Register of Heritage Places, before receiving a permanent entry on 16 December 1994.

=== 21st century ===
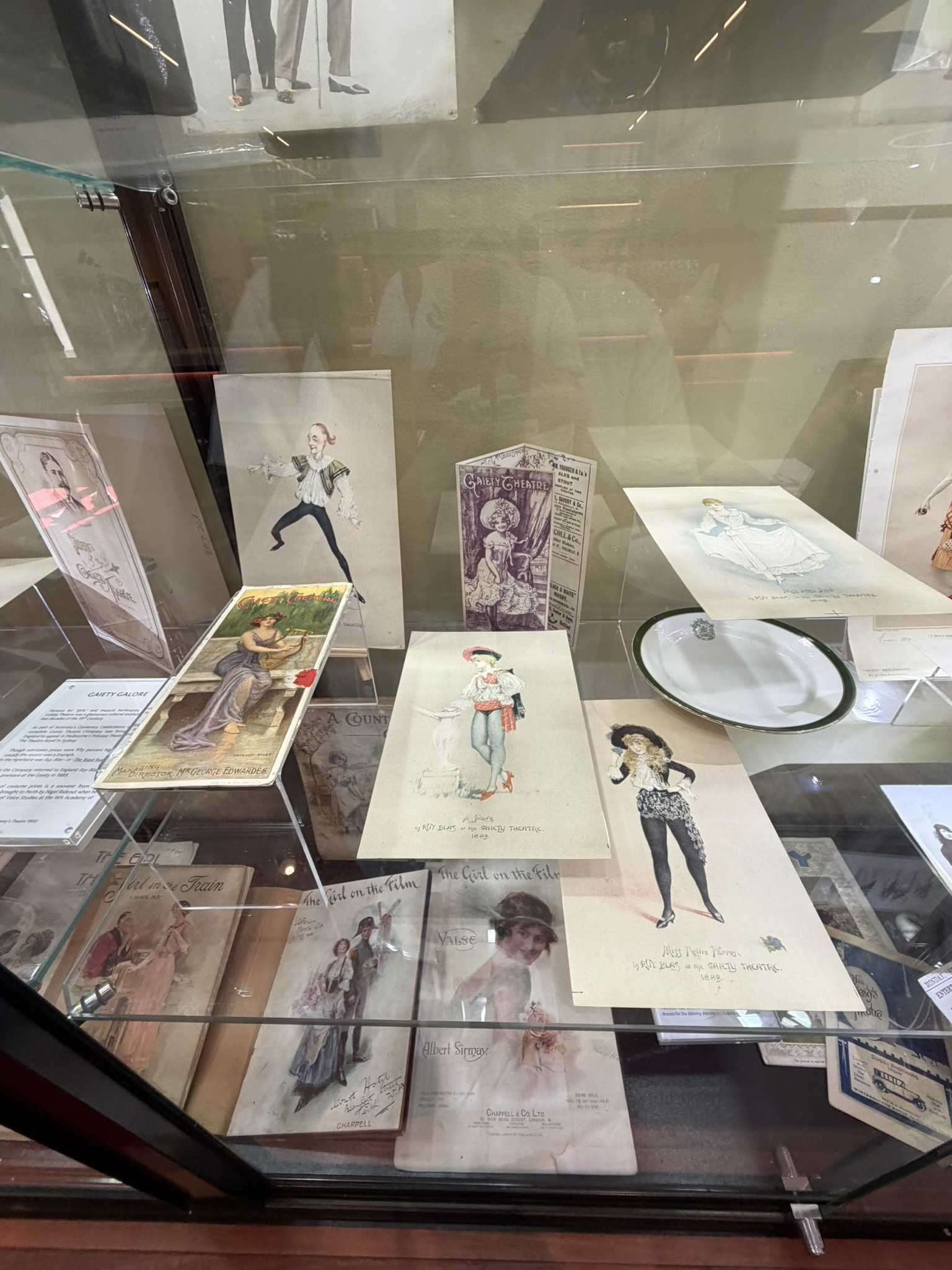
Memorabilia cabinets on show in the theatre in 2026

The theatre was named a State Heritage Icon in December 2004, and since February 2001 has housed a Museum of Performing Arts.

In 2004, the theatre celebrated its centenary; events included the publications of David Hough's volume of history. In 2006 the theatre became twinned with the only other remaining theatre of the same name in the world, His Majesty's Theatre in Aberdeen, Scotland.

The theatre is believed to be the only remaining working Edwardian theatre in Australia, and is presently managed on behalf of the Perth Theatre Trust by AEG Ogden, which also manages the Perth Concert Hall.

In 2008, Savcor (a company which specialises in restoration techniques for concrete and steel) was contracted to do a detailed survey of His Majesty's Theatre. This survey revealed a number of defects on the façades that potentially rendered it unsafe. In 2010, a project involving the restoration of damaged cornices and corbels was carried out. Damaged decorations were replaced by using modern repair mortars which produced perfect reproductions. Mick Summers was in charge of crafting the ornate flowers around the façade. This was achieved with the help of latex moulds which were taken from the original form. Due to structural deterioration, many of the balconies had to be rebuilt completely. The balconies' many features, including clamshell base, curved profile and plaster features, required many different processes to recreate the original. Both latex moulding and traditional construction techniques were used to make sure the balconies remained durable.

In December 2021, renovation work began to reinstate external balcony structures and return the 118-year-old building to its original façade. The Perth Theatre Trust said restoration of the balconies to their original splendour and upgrades of foyers would ensure the theatre remained a viable entertainment venue for future generations: "The extensive renovation will improve patron experience by enhancing the theatre's main entrance and street precinct character; and extending internal foyer spaces to make them more accessible and functional". The canopy was removed and replaced with two levels of balconies designed to reflect Wolfe's intent. The balconies were constructed in sections and craned into place. They are more complex than the originals and can accommodate a variety of uses. The works were completed at the end of 2022.

== Notable performances ==
In addition to being home to the West Australian Opera and the West Australian Ballet, His Majesty's Theatre has hosted famous performers over the years, including:

- Edouard Borovansky – Czech-Australian ballet dancer, visited five times between 1945 and 1960
- Claudette Colbert – French-born American actress
- Peter Cook – English comedian, toured with Dudley Moore
- Margot Fonteyn – English ballerina
- Amelita Galli-Curci – Italian coloratura soprano
- John Gielgud – English actor and singer
- Percy Grainger – Australian-born pianist and composer
- Rex Harrison – English actor
- Robert Helpmann – Australian actor and dancer, starred with Katharine Hepburn in three Shakespeare plays in 1955
- Katharine Hepburn – American actress, starred with Robert Helpmann in three Shakespeare plays in 1955
- Barry Humphries – Australian comedian and character actor, best known for playing Dame Edna Everage
- James Earl Jones – American actor, starred in Driving Miss Daisy in 2013
- Angela Lansbury – British-American actor, starred in Driving Miss Daisy in 2013
- Harry Lauder – Scottish entertainer, performed in 1923
- Vivien Leigh – English actress, starred in Twelfth Night by the Old Vic in 1962
- Ian McKellen – English actor, starred in Waiting for Godot in 2010
- Nellie Melba – Australian soprano
- Gladys Moncrieff – Australian singer and musical theatre actress
- Dudley Moore – English actor and comedian, toured with Peter Cook
- Anna Pavlova – Russian ballerina
- Geoffrey Rush – Australian actor
- Maggie Smith – English actress
- Sybil Thorndike – English actress
- Emlyn Williams – Welsh actor, starred as Charles Dickens in 1958

== Gallery ==
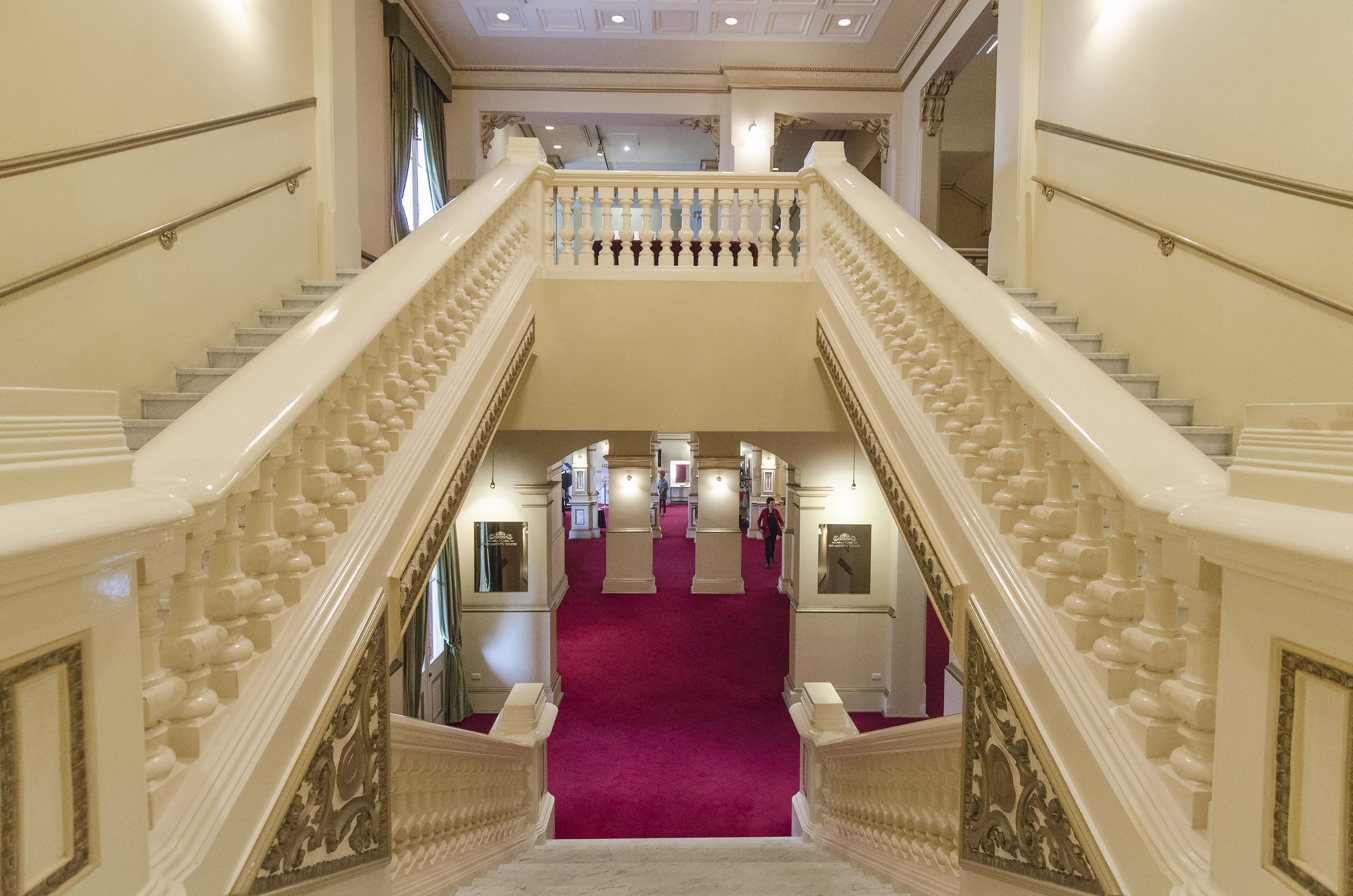
Staircase from first floor landing

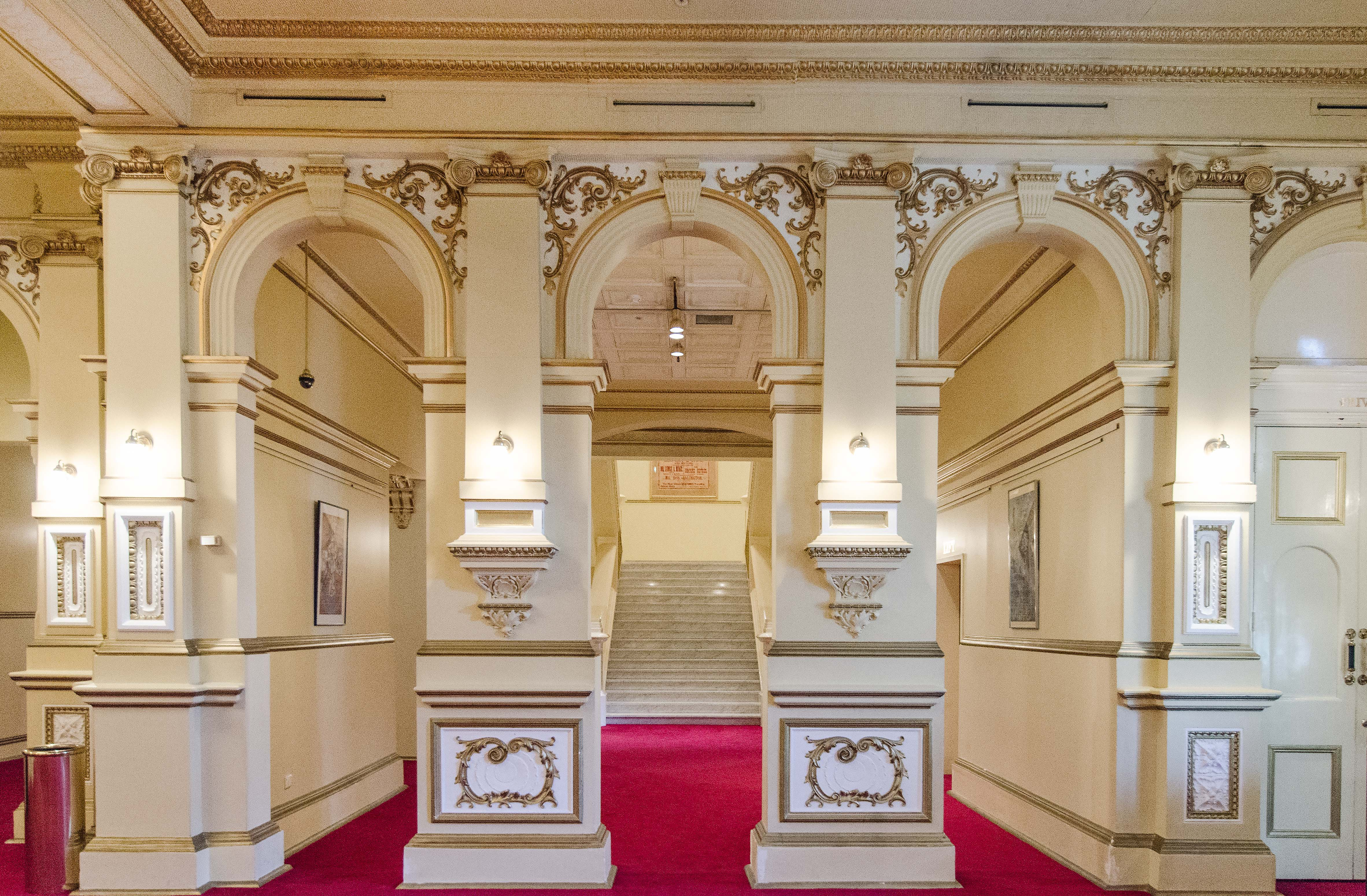
Upper floor foyer

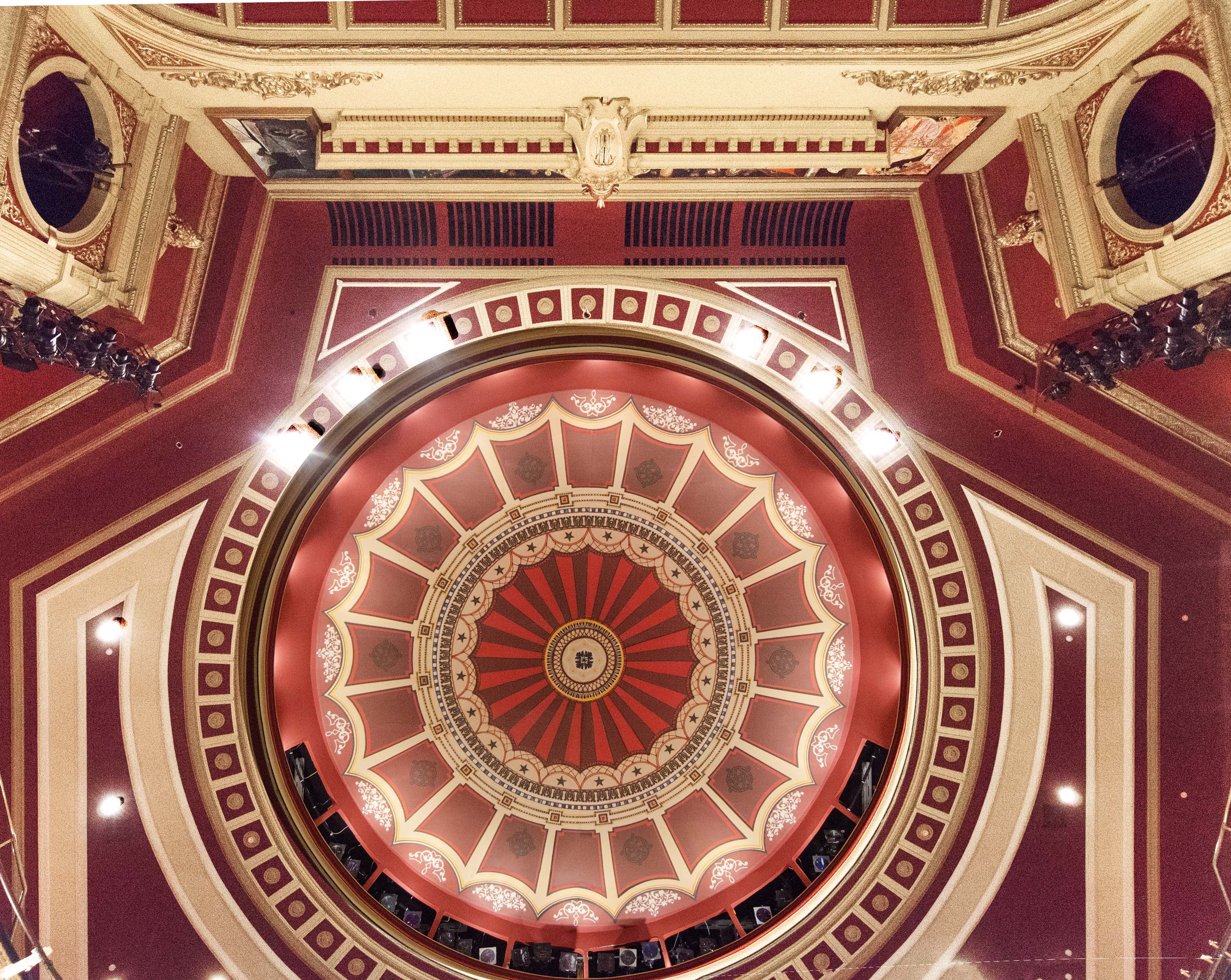
Inside of cupola

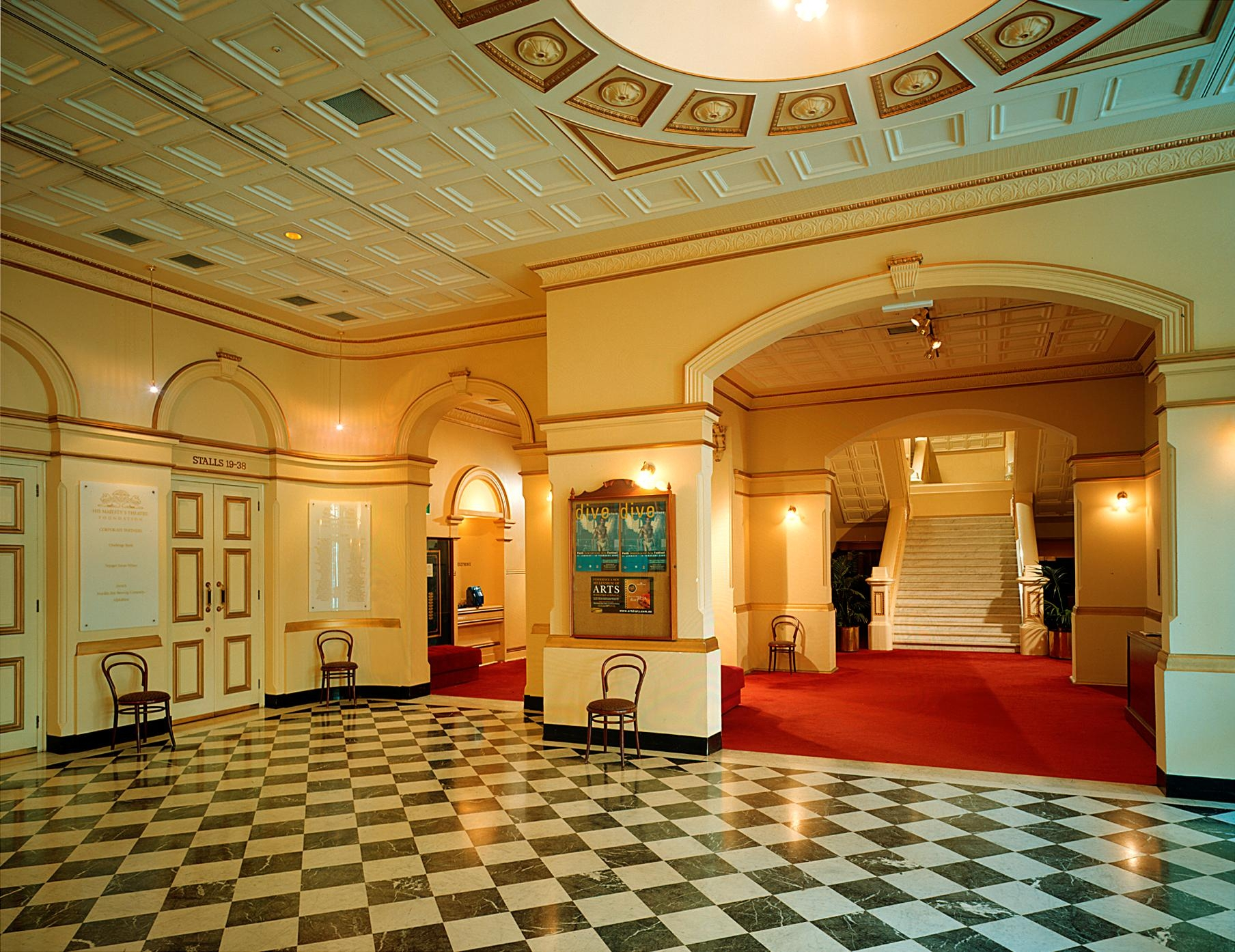
Stalls foyer

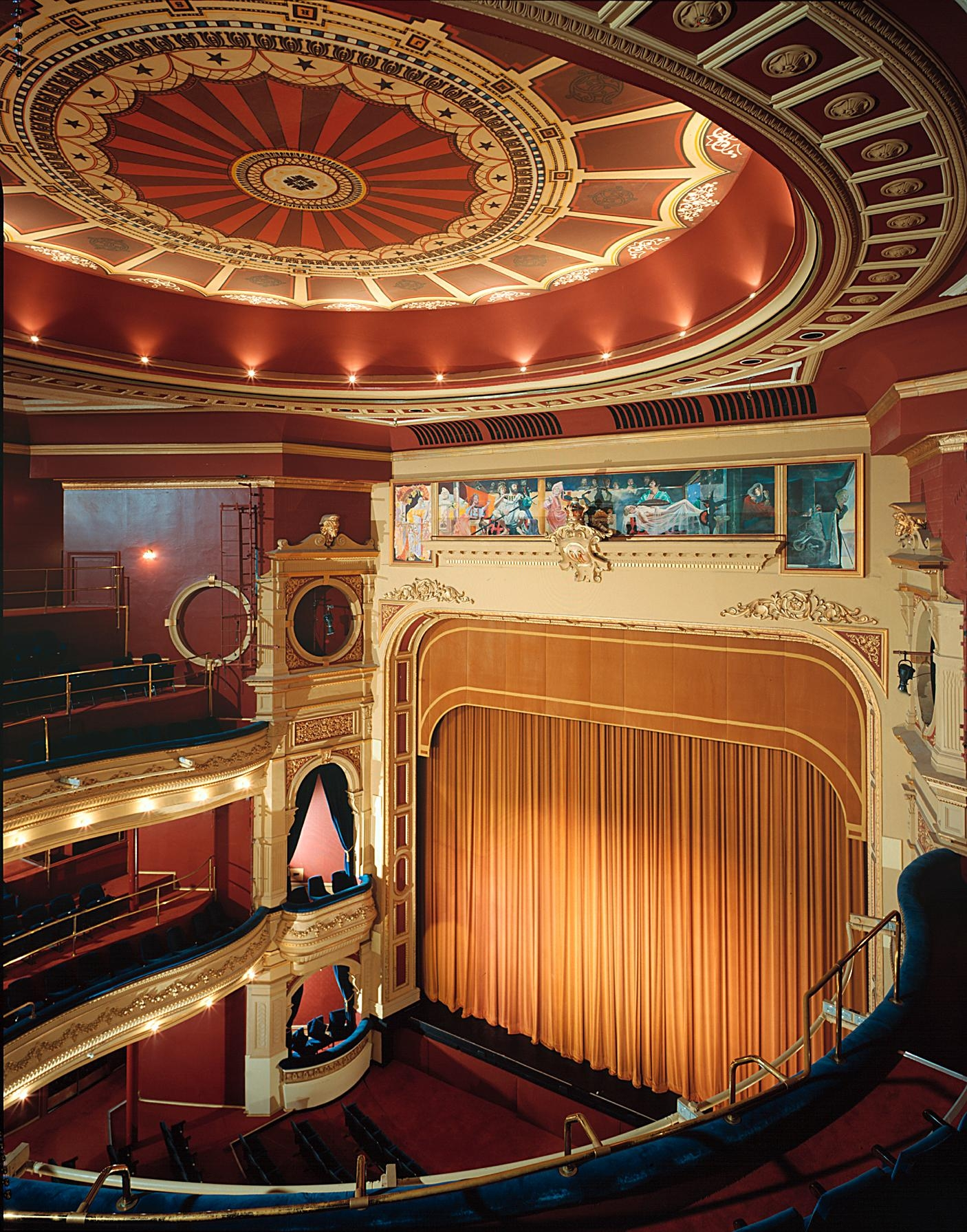
Dome and curtain

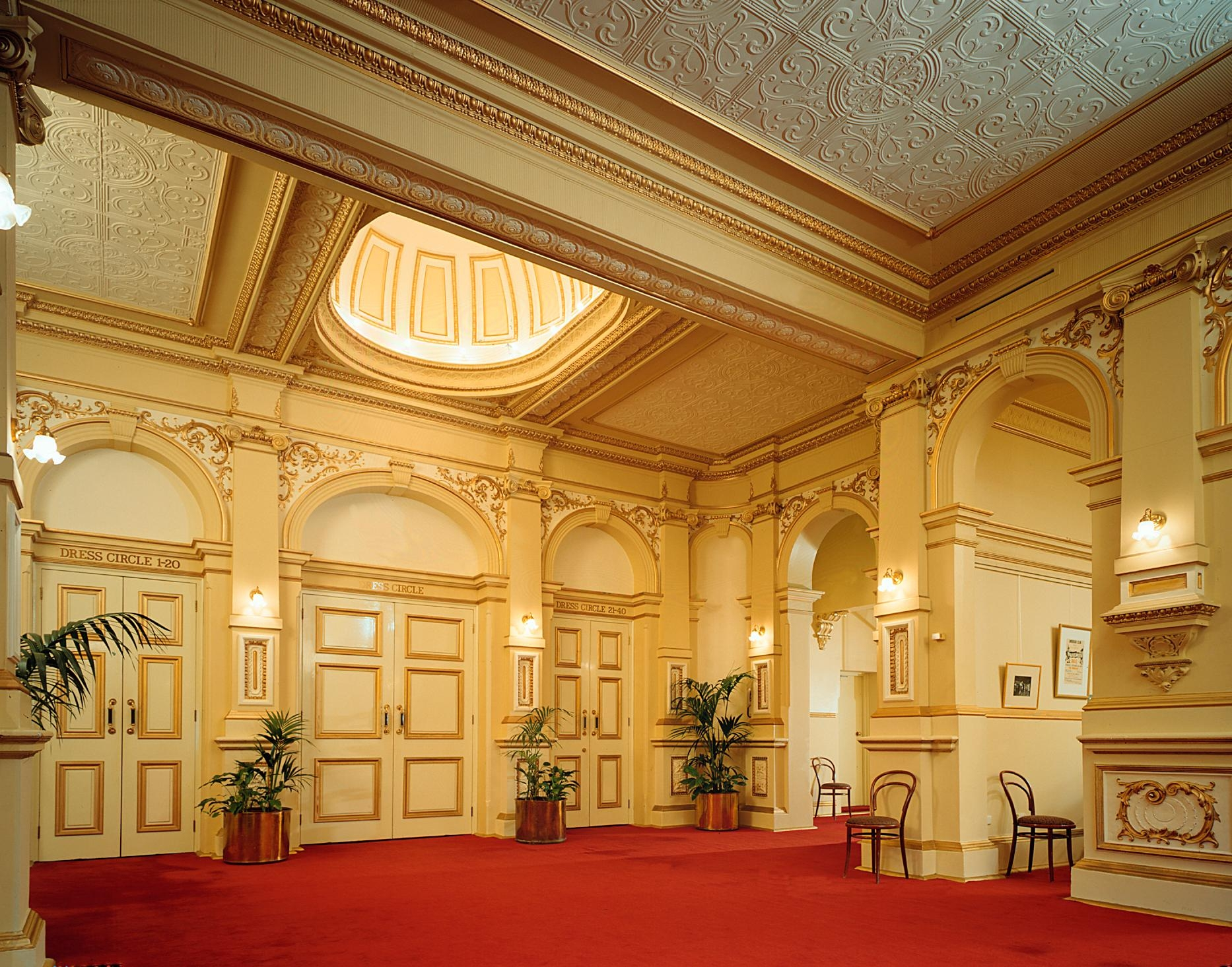
Dress circle foyer

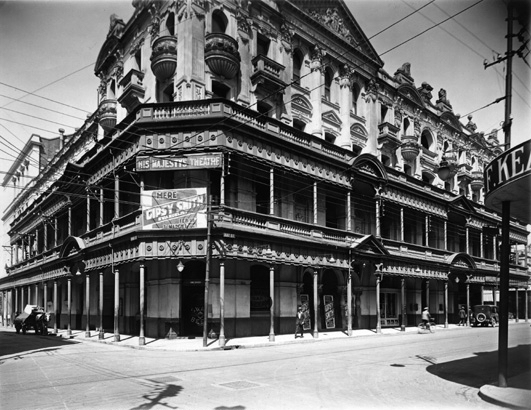
Exterior balconies in 1926

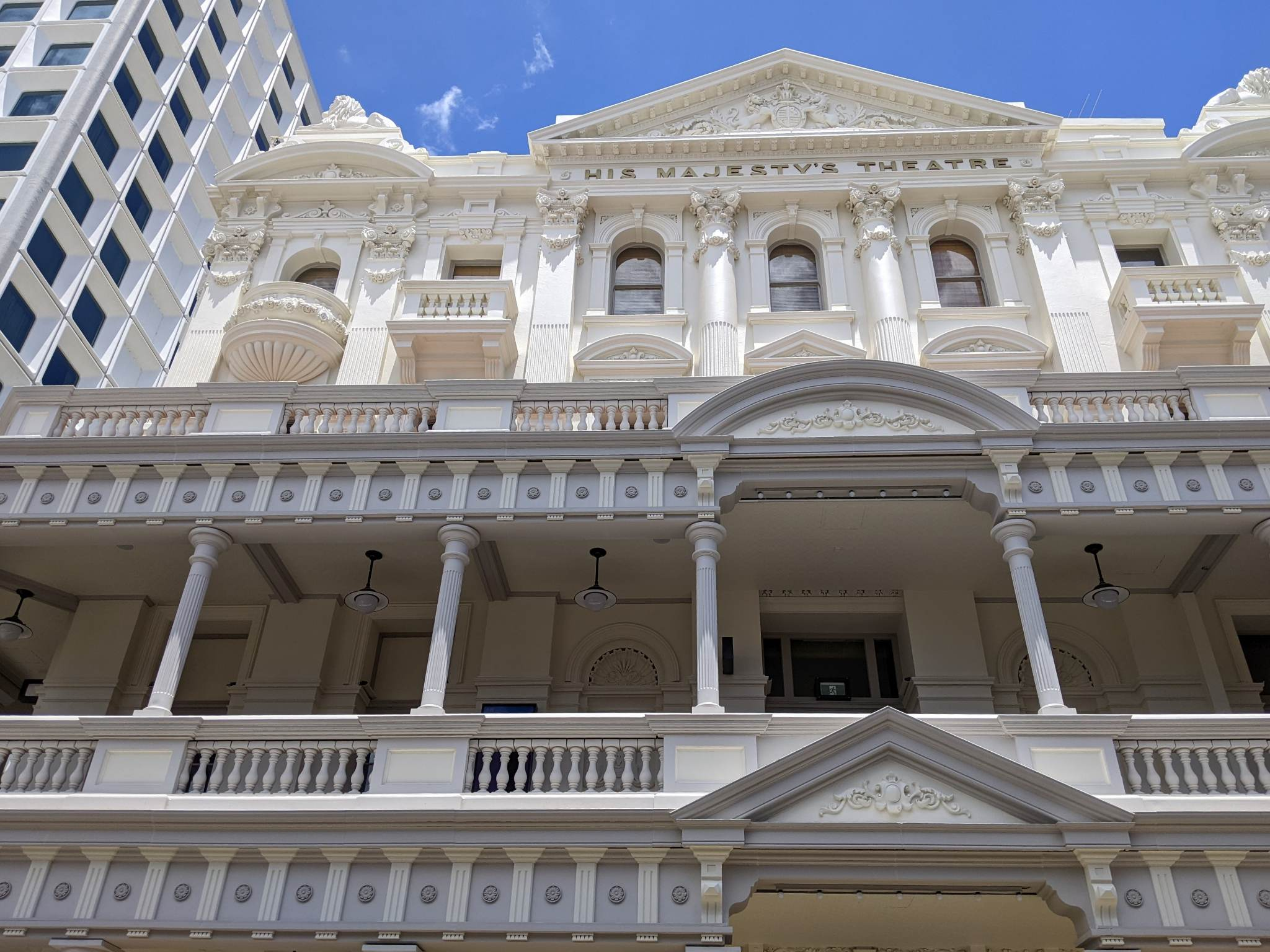
External balconies following restoration

== See also ==
- The Playhouse Theatre (Perth)
- Regal Theatre
- Perth Theatre Trust

== Sources ==
- "Assessment Documentation" (PDF). Register of Heritage Places. Heritage Council of Western Australia. 28 February 1995. Archived from the original (PDF) on 23 May 2009.
- Banks, Ron (26 May 2004). "His Majesty's Theatre opening night". West Australian. p. 20.
- Gervas, Stan (2004) [1991]. Five Graves in Dalwallinu. Maylands: Gervas Books. ISBN 0-646-06820-2.
- Gordon, M. (2004). "The Original His Majesty's - 1904" (PDF). His Majesty's Theatre. Archived from the original (PDF) on 19 July 2008.
- "Heritage News - Number 6: Spring 2011". Heritage News. City of Perth. 2011.
- "His Majesty's Theatre, 825 Hay St, Perth, WA, Australia (Place ID 16697 )". Australian Heritage Database. Australian Government.
- "His Majesty's Theatre". Department of Culture and the Arts. Archived from the original on 10 July 2009.
- "History". His Majesty's Theatre.
- Hough, David (2004). Hutchison, June (ed.). A Dream of Passion: The Centennial History of His Majesty's Theatre. Perth: His Majesty's Theatre. ISBN 1-920843-09-4.
- King, Ivan (2004). "Programme Biography of 'The Maj'" (PDF). His Majesty's Theatre. Archived from the original (PDF) on 19 July 2008.
- "Permanent Entry" (PDF). Register of Heritage Places. Heritage Council of Western Australia. Archived from the original (PDF) on 19 June 2009.
- "Perth Concert Hall". Department of Culture and the Arts. Archived from the original on 25 July 2008.
- "The show goes on during 'Maj' makeover". Arts and Culture Trust. 20 October 2021.
