= Perth Film Studios =

Screen production facility in Perth, Australia

- Location within Western Australia

General information
- Type: Film and television studios
- Location: Whiteman, Western Australia, 390 Marshall Road
- Coordinates: 31.853892°S 115.931535°E
- Opened: January 2026
- Cost: A$233.5M
- Owner: Arts & Culture Trust

Website
- perthfilmstudios.com

Perth Film Studios is a screen production facility located in Whiteman, a suburb of Perth in Western Australia.

The facility opened in January 2026 and is one of four major film and television production studios in Australia, the others being Disney Studios Australia in New South Wales, Docklands Studios Melbourne in Victoria, and Village Roadshow Studios in Queensland.

== Facilities ==
Perth Film Studios is the first large scale screen production facility to be built in Western Australia. As of September 2026, it features four sound stages totalling 8,400 square metres (90,000 ft^{2}), dedicated production office suites, workshops, and a 2.3-hectare (5.7-acre) backlot. It is owned and managed by the Government of Western Australia's Arts & Culture Trust.

== History ==
Plans for Perth Film Studios were first revealed in 2013, where it was proposed to be built as a private venture on the main Murdoch campus of Murdoch University, as part of a larger development. However, the university rejected the studio proposal the following year.

In June 2021, the Government of Western Australia announced that the studios, now a state government initiative, would be built at Victoria Quay in Fremantle. The announcement followed an uptick in international film and television productions being shot in Australia, partially due to the COVID-19 pandemic disrupting Hollywood productions as well as an increase in demand for global streaming content.

In November 2022, it was announced that Perth Film Studios would be built in Whiteman instead, as part of the Ballajura railway station development precinct. Cost and logistics issues were cited as the reasons for the relocation from the Fremantle site. Perth Film Studios started construction in January 2024. The facility cost A$233.5 million, with the state government committing a further A$57 million to support the studio's first decade of operation.

Perth Film Studios became functionally operational in January 2026, though no projects had been booked at the studios at the time. The first production to use the facility was Two Birds, a series for Stan and ITV Studios.

In September 2026 a public open day for the facility was held.

== Productions ==
=== Television ===
- Two Birds
