= Venues of the 2018 Commonwealth Games =

The 2018 Commonwealth Games venues were mostly located in the host city of Gold Coast, though some other events require facilities located elsewhere.

== Sporting venues ==
The Gold Coast 2018 was hosted across 18 venues located on the Gold Coast and in Brisbane, Townsville and Cairns. Sporting venues were well ahead available of Gold Coast 2018 ensuring that they were used and tested before the Games.

=== Central Gold Coast City ===
Venue	Sports	Capacity	Ref.
Broadbeach Bowls Club	Lawn bowling	2,500	
Carrara Stadium	Athletics, Ceremonies (opening/closing)	40,000	
Carrara Sports and Leisure Centre	Badminton, Powerlifting, Weightlifting, Wrestling	5,000	
Gold Coast Convention and Exhibition Centre	Basketball (finals), Netball (preliminaries)	5,000	
Nerang Mountain Bike Trails	Cycling (mountain biking)	2,000	

=== North Gold Coast City ===
Venue	Sports	Capacity	Ref.
Coomera Indoor Sports Centre	Gymnastics, Netball (finals)	7,500	
Gold Coast Hockey Centre	Hockey	5,000	
Gold Coast Aquatic Centre	Aquatics (swimming, diving)	10,000/2,500	
Oxenford Studios	Boxing, Table Tennis, Squash	2,500/2,750/3,000	
Southport Broadwater Parklands	Athletics (marathon, racewalking), Triathlon	2,500	

=== South Gold Coast City ===
Venue	Sports	Capacity	Ref.
Currumbin Beachfront	Cycling (road)	N/A	
Coolangatta Beachfront	Beach Volleyball	4,000	
Robina Stadium	Rugby sevens	27,500	

=== Outside Gold Coast City ===
Venue	Sports	Capacity	Ref.
Anna Meares Velodrome	Cycling (track)	4,000	
Belmont Shooting Centre	Shooting	3,000	
Cairns Convention Centre	Basketball (preliminaries)	5,000	
Townsville Entertainment and Convention Centre	Basketball (preliminaries)	5,000	

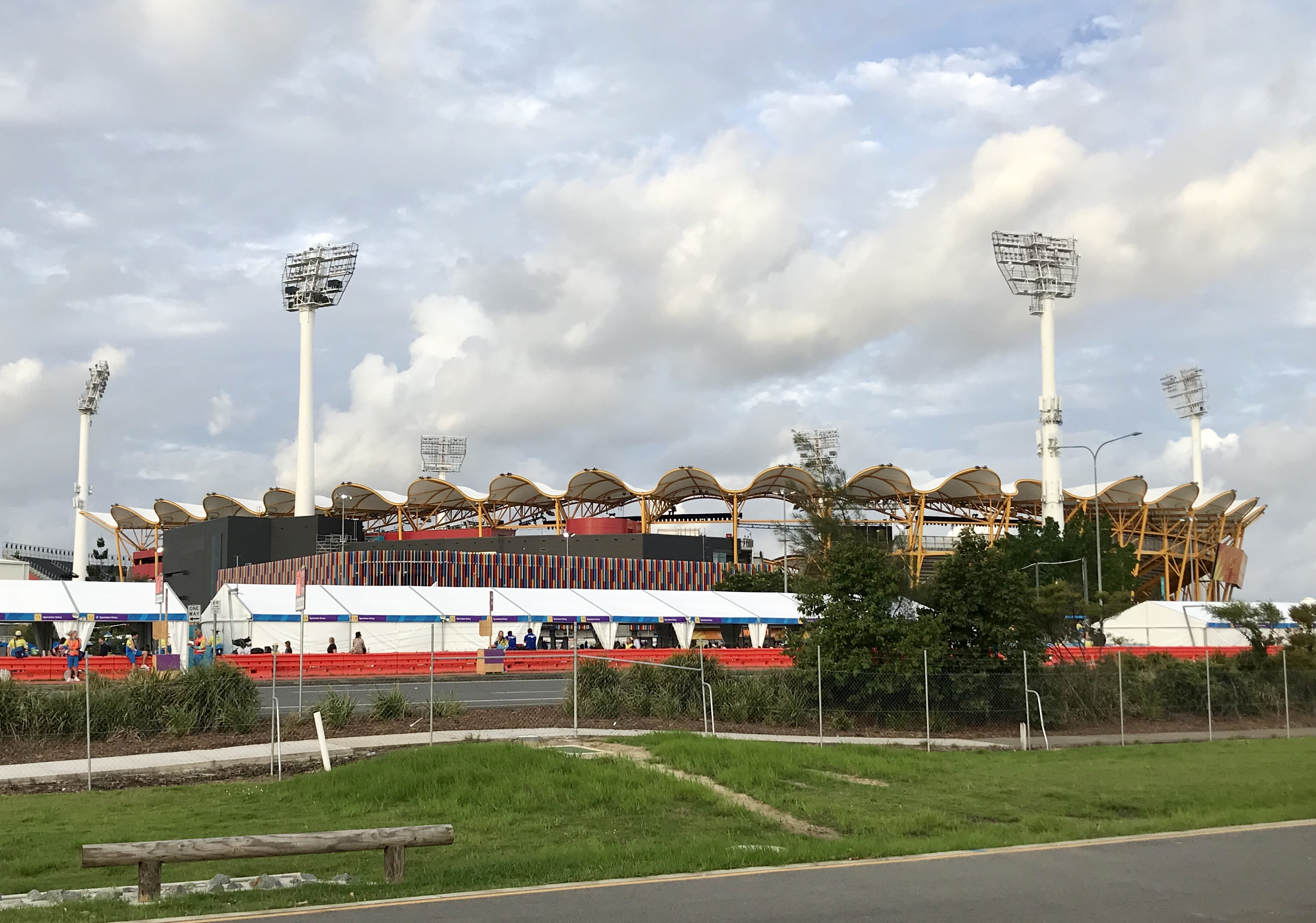
Carrara Stadium

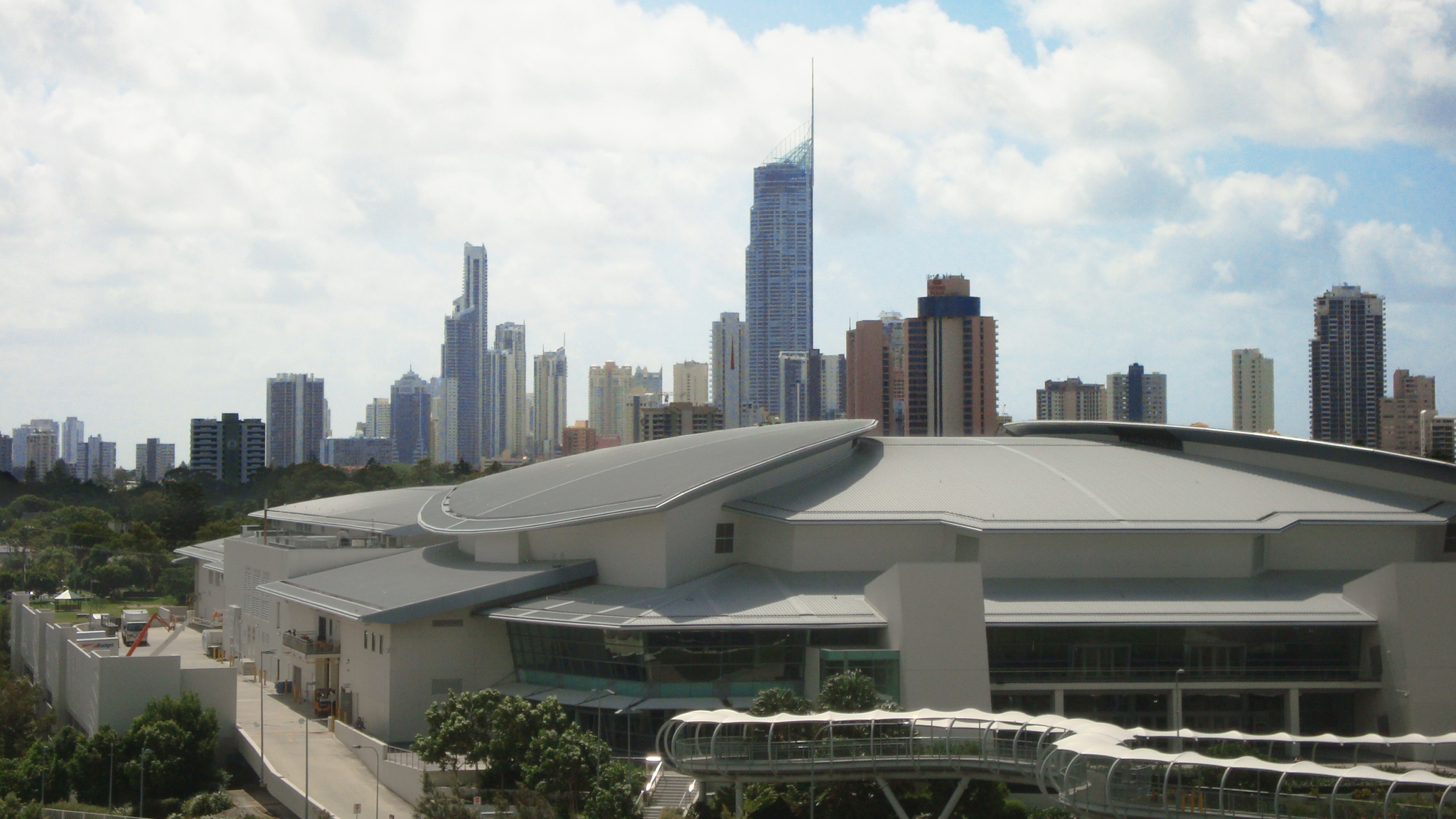
Gold coast convention and exhibition centre

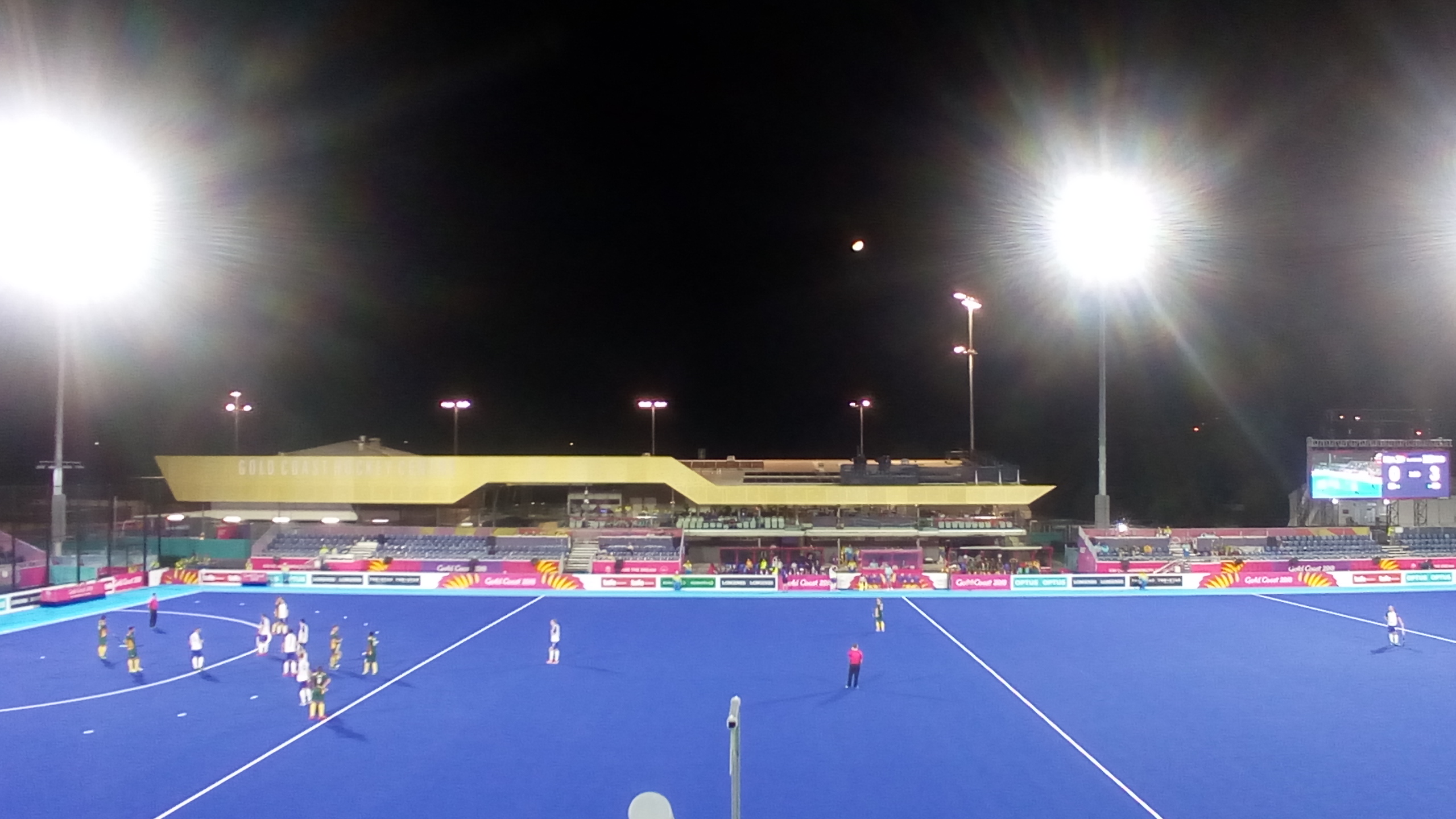
Gold Coast Hockey Centre

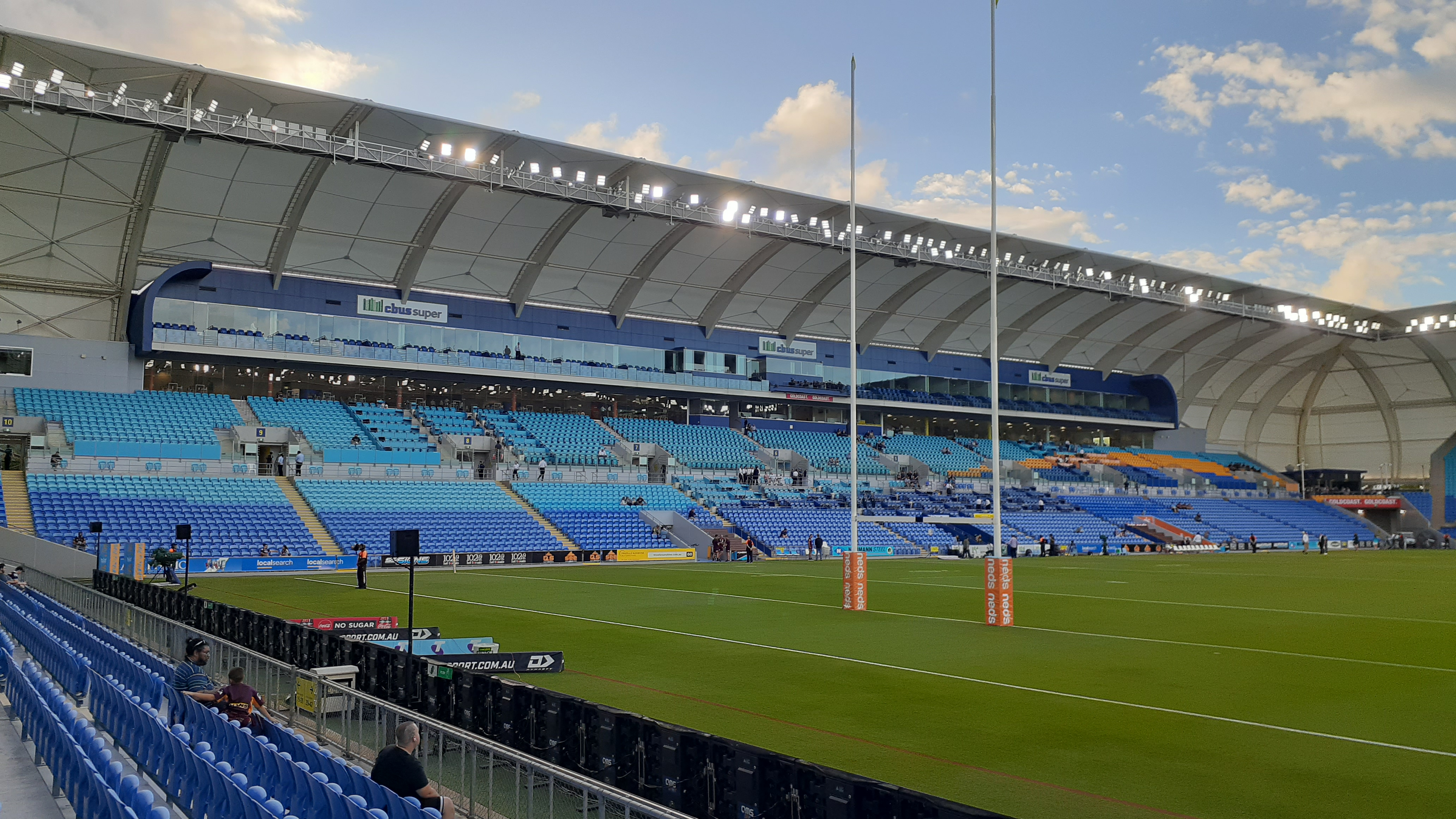
Robina Stadium

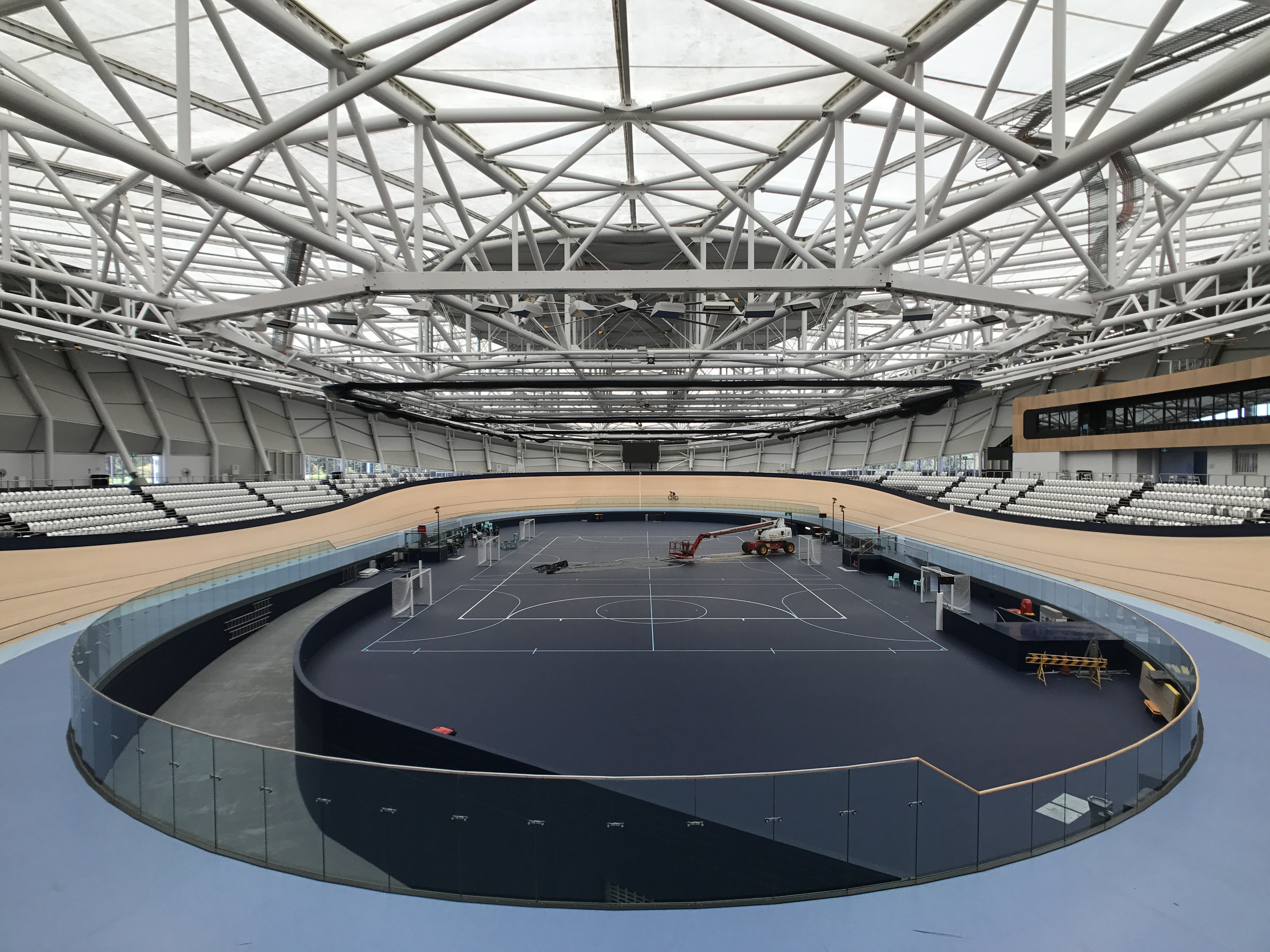
Anna Meares Velodrome

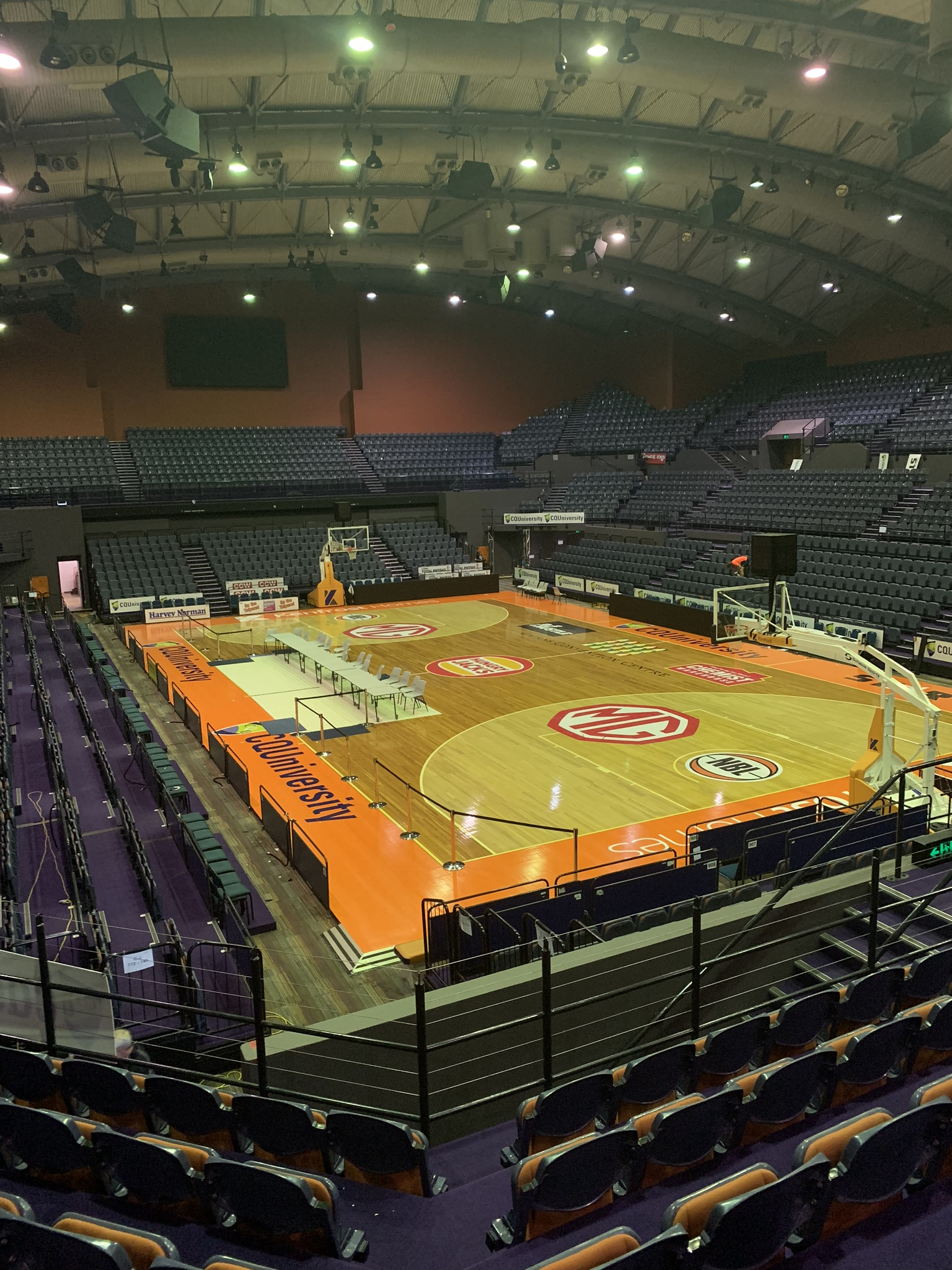
Cairns Convention Centre

== Costs ==
The Australian and Queensland Governments and the City of Gold Coast invested A$320 million to deliver new and upgraded venues.

The cost invested on building new venues are below:

Venue	Cost
Coomera Indoor Sports Centre	A$40 million
Carrara Sports and Leisure Centre	A$105 million
Anna Meares Velodrome	A$60 million
Oxenford Studios	A$15.5 million (Queensland Government A$11.1 million)

The cost invested on upgrading the venues are below:

Venue	Cost
Carrara Stadium	A$6 million
Carrara Indoor Stadium	A$8 million
Gold Coast Aquatic Centre	A$41 million
Gold Coast Hockey Centre	A$16 million
Broadbeach Bowls Club	A$4 million
Nerang Mountain Bike Trails	A$3 million
Belmont Shooting Centre	A$19 million

== Athlete’s Village ==
The Athletes Village was officially opened from 25 March 2018 and provided accommodation and services to 6,600 athletes and officials in 1252 permanent dwellings. It was located in Southport, Gold Coast and was built at a cost of A$550 million. There were 1170 one and two-bedroom apartments and 82 three-bedroom townhouses. The village had three zones - International, Residential and Operational. The residential zone accommodated athletes and officials and also offered recreation, gym and medical facilities. The equipment in the gym was sponsored by Technogym. Adjoining the gym was the Athlete Recovery Area. The International Zone consisted of retail services, shops and the main dining hall. The Festival 2018 events were also held in the International Zone. The Dining hall served over 18,000 meals per day to the athletes during the Games. Australian telecommunications company Optus opened a store in the International zone named "Yes Optus Store" which provided free calling services to the athletes and officials and other services such as phone charging and watching events of the Games in televisions. Optus also provided free Wifi services in the village.

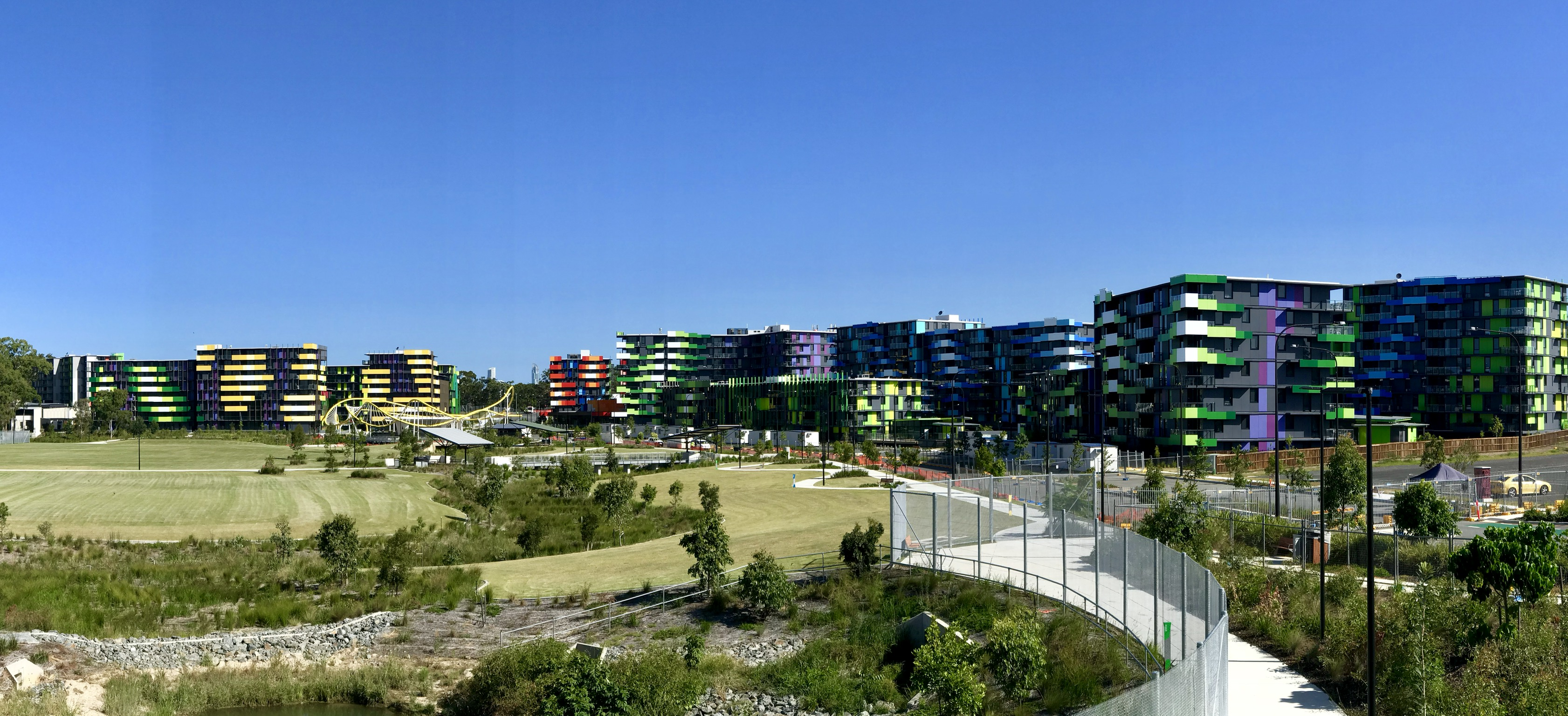
The Athletes Village for the 2018 Commonwealth Games

== See also ==
- List of Commonwealth Games venues
