= Arts & Culture Trust =

Statutory authority in Western Australia

Arts and Culture Trust

Statutory authority overview
- Preceding agencies: National Theatre Company (W.A.); Perth Repertory Club; Perth Theatre Trust
- Jurisdiction: Western Australia
- Headquarters: 825 Hay Street, Perth
- Minister responsible: Simone McGurk, Minister for Creative Industries
- Parent department: Department of Creative Industries, Tourism and Sport
- Website: ptt.wa.gov.au

The Arts and Culture Trust (formerly Perth Theatre Trust) is a statutory authority that manages and operates cultural venues in Western Australia (WA). It manages His Majesty's Theatre, the State Theatre Centre of Western Australia, the Subiaco Arts Centre (leased from the City of Subiaco), the Albany Entertainment Centre, the Goldfields Arts Centre, the Perth Film Studios and the Perth Cultural Centre. The trust leases the Perth Concert Hall from the City of Perth, but the venue is managed by WA Venue and Events. The trust also has a Museum of Performing Arts based in the His Majesty's Theatre building.

== History ==
The trust was created in 1980 to manage theatre properties in the central business district of Perth, Western Australia. This involved bringing the Perth Concert Hall and His Majesty's Theatre within a single administrative unit. In February 1984 the now defunct Playhouse Theatre and National Theatre (the company; later reconstituted as the Western Australian Theatre Company) were taken over by the trust. The trust also incorporated and inherited records from preceding bodies, such as the Perth Repertory Club, which had been established in 1919. The Subiaco Arts Centre was also later included in the trust's scope.

Activities of the Trust included the re-opening of a renovated His Majesty's Theatre in 1980, and publications advertising theatre in Perth.

In 2011, the State Theatre Centre of Western Australia was built, with its main theatre being called the Heath Ledger Theatre, after the late actor Heath Ledger who hails from WA.

From 2015, the Trust began to directly manage His Majesty's Theatre, the State Theatre Centre of Western Australia, Perth Concert Hall, and Subiaco Arts Centre, after fifteen years of outsourcing operations to AEG Ogden.

The Trust leases the Goldfields Arts Centre in Kalgoorlie to the City of Kalgoorlie-Boulder. On 1 July 2018, the Trust assumed responsibility for the management and activation of the Perth Cultural Centre precinct from the Metropolitan Redevelopment Authority.

On the 1st July 2022, the Perth Theatre Trust was dissolved and immediately replaced by the Arts & Culture Trust to serve the same functions, with the added capability of managing non theatre spaces, such as the Perth Cultural Centre and the Perth Film Studios.

In 2024, it was announced that the Perth Concert Hall would be receiving a renovation, which began construction in 2025.

In January 2026, the A$300 million Perth Film Studios project finished practical completion.
