= Docklands Studios Melbourne =

Australian film and TV production studio

Coordinates: 37.814902°S 144.937113°E

General information
- Status: Completed
- Type: Film and television studios complex
- Location: Docklands, Melbourne, Australia
- Completed: 2004; 22 years ago
- Owner: State of Victoria

Website
- www.dsmelbourne.com

Docklands Studios Melbourne is a major film and television production complex located in the redeveloped Docklands precinct of Melbourne, Victoria, Australia. Situated approximately two kilometres (1.2 mi) from Melbourne central business district, the facility opened in 2004 to support Victoria's screen industry and attract both international and domestic productions to Melbourne.

It is one of Australia's four major studios, alongside Village Roadshow Studios (Gold Coast), Disney Studios Australia (Sydney) and Perth Fim Studios.

Docklands Studios Melbourne is a hybrid campus, with a mix of conventional stages, a television broadcast centre, and two LED volume stages operated by NantStudios.

Two of the sound stages feature permanent sub-floor waterpits: Stage 1: 18m long x 12 m wide x 3m deep (59ft x 39ft x 10ft) and Stage 6: 20m long x 18m wide x 4.5m deep (66ft x 33ft x 15ft).

== Background ==
Docklands Studios Melbourne aerial perspective taken July 2022 with Melbourne city in background.

The push for a major studio in Melbourne arose in the late 1990s. At the time, industry leaders expressed concern that the city was "losing some of its media city position to arch-rival Sydney and to the Gold Coast". Establishing a state-of-the-art facility was viewed as a strategic necessity to reflect Melbourne's global ambitions, develop production capacity, and support the needs of the local film and television industry. At the time, Melbourne had a number of smaller facilities with sound stages, but did not have a large state-of-the-art complex.

== History ==
Construction began in 2003 on government-provided land as a partnership between the Victorian Government and a private consortium. The complex opened in April 2004 under the name Melbourne Central City Studios with the Australian feature film production, Hating Alison Ashley as its first major production.

In 2005, the facility hosted its first major international project, Ghost Rider. With a budget of around A$120 million, it was the biggest feature film ever made in Victoria.

In 2008, following the withdrawal of the private consortium, the State of Victoria took control of the facility and it was officially renamed Docklands Studios Melbourne.

== 2020s Expansion ==
In 2022, the studio completed a major expansion with the opening of Stage 6, a 3,700-square-metre (40,000 sq ft) super stage that increased total capacity by 60 per cent and drove a surge in large-scale international productions in Victoria.

Productions filmed in Stage 6 include Michael Gracey's Better Man, Netflix’s The Survivors and War Machine, Sony Pictures’ Thrash and Insidious: Out of the Further, Marc Butan's Empire City, Dan Pritzker's Fog City, and Amazon MGM's Deadlocked.

The two LED volume stages have hosted a number of productions including Peacock's All Her Fault, Nocturnal Entertainment's Play Dead, Mat Govoni's Wilderness,and Apple TV's Last Seen.

Australian productions filmed at the studio recently include Carver Films' Saccharine, and Princess Pictures' Together, Stake Out, and Hotel Hotel Hotel Hotel.

Antony Tulloch, a film industry veteran, has served as CEO since 2022.

== Facilities ==
The studio complex consists of six sound stages with a total area of close to 10,000 m^{2} (110,000 sq ft), various production offices, a workshop divided into bays of different sizes and parking for more than 650 vehicles. The sound stages vary in size from 743 to 3,700 m^{2} (8,000 to 39,830 sq ft). They are hired for production of feature films, drama series and audience-based television programs as well as television commercials, music videos and corporate events.

== Productions ==
=== Feature films and TV dramas ===
By year of release or broadcast (* denotes production base only)

- Hating Alison Ashley (2005)
- The Extra (2005)
- Last Man Standing (2005)
- Charlotte's Web (2006)
- Nightmares and Dreamscapes: From the Stories of Stephen King (2006)
- Ghost Rider (2007)
- Chak De! India (2007)
- Storm Warning (2007)
- Satisfaction (2007–2009)
- As the Bell Rings (Disney
- Where the Wild Things Are (2009)
- Knowing (2009)
- The Pacific (miniseries) (2010)
- Tomorrow, When the War Began (2010)
- Don't Be Afraid of the Dark (2010)
- The Eye of the Storm * (2011)
- Winners and Losers (2011–2016)
- Killer Elite (2011)
- Jack Irish (2012/2016/2020)
- Crawlspace (2012)
- Patrick (2013)
- INXS: Never Tear Us Apart (2014)
- I, Frankenstein (2014)
- Predestination (2014)
- The Dressmaker (2015)
- Oddball (2015)
- Sucker * (2015)
- Partisan * (2015)
- Childhood's End (2015)
- The Menkoff Method (2016)
- Restoration (2016)
- Lion * (2016)
- The Legend of Ben Hall (2016)
- The Leftovers S3 (2017)
- Berlin Syndrome (2017)
- Ronny Chieng: International Student * (2017)
- Guilty (2017)
- Brothers' Nest * (2018)
- The Cry * (2018)
- Winchester (2018)
- Upgrade (2018)
- Bad Mothers (2019)
- Judy and Punch (2019)
- Ride Like a Girl * (2019)
- The Wheel (2019)
- Choir Girl (2019)
- The Whistleblower (2019)
- True History of the Kelly Gang (2019)
- Preacher S4 (2019)
- Relic * (2020)
- Shantaram (2021)
- Clickbait (2021)
- La Brea S1, S2 (2021–2023)
- The King's Daughter (2022)
- Foe (2022)
- Late Night with the Devil (2023)
- Better Man (2024)
- Windcatcher (2024)
- Force of Nature: The Dry 2 * (2024)
- Together (2025)
- Ice Road: Vengeance (2025)
- The Survivors (2025)
- All Her Fault (2025)
- Saccharine (2026)
- Thrash (2026)
- Last Seen (2026)
- Insidious: Out of the Further (2026)
- War Machine (2026)
- Wilderness (tba)
- Empire City (tba)
- Play Dead (tba)
- Stake Out (tba)
- Hotel Hotel Hotel Hotel (tba)
- Fog City (tba)
- Deadlocked (tba)

=== Audience-based and reality TV ===
==== Current ====
- The 1% Club (Seven Network, 2023–present)
- Deal or No Deal (Network 10, 2024–present)
- Millionaire Hot Seat (Network 10, 2025-present)
- Tipping Point Australia (Nine Network, 2026-present)

==== Ongoing ====
- Racing.com

==== Past ====
- The Rich List (Seven Network, 2007)
- 1 vs. 100 (Nine Network, 2007–2008)
- Hole in the Wall (Nine Network, 2008)
- Project Runway Australia (Foxtel, 2008)
- Are You Smarter Than a 5th Grader? (Network 10, 2008–2009)
- Talkin' 'Bout Your Generation (Network 10 and Nine Network, 2009–2012, 2018–2019)
- Beat the Star (Seven Network, 2010)
- Iron Chef Australia (Seven Network, 2010)
- Australia's Got Talent (Seven Network, 2010–2012)
- Ben Elton Live from Planet Earth (Nine Network, 2011)
- The Million Dollar Drop (Nine Network, 2011)
- Millionaire Hot Seat (Nine Network, 2011–2023)
- The AFL Footy Show (Nine Network, 2011–2019)
- Everybody Dance Now (Network 10, 2012)
- SlideShow (Seven Network, 2013)
- MasterChef Australia (Network 10, 2014)
- Q&A, Melbourne episodes (ABC TV, 2016–2017)
- The Big Music Quiz (Seven Network 2016)
- Dancing With the Stars (Network 10, 2020)
- The Masked Singer (Australian season 2) (Network 10, 2020)
- The Weakest Link (2021)
- Come Dance with Me (TV series) (CBS, 2022)
- Would I Lie to You? (Network 10, 2022–2023)
- Aunty Donna's Coffee Cafe (ABC TV, 2023)
- Taskmaster Australia (Network 10, 2023)
- Blow Up (Australian TV series) (Seven Network, 2023)
- The Quiz with Balls (Fox, 2024)
