= King Street, Perth =

Street in Perth, Western Australia

King Street, Perth Western Australia
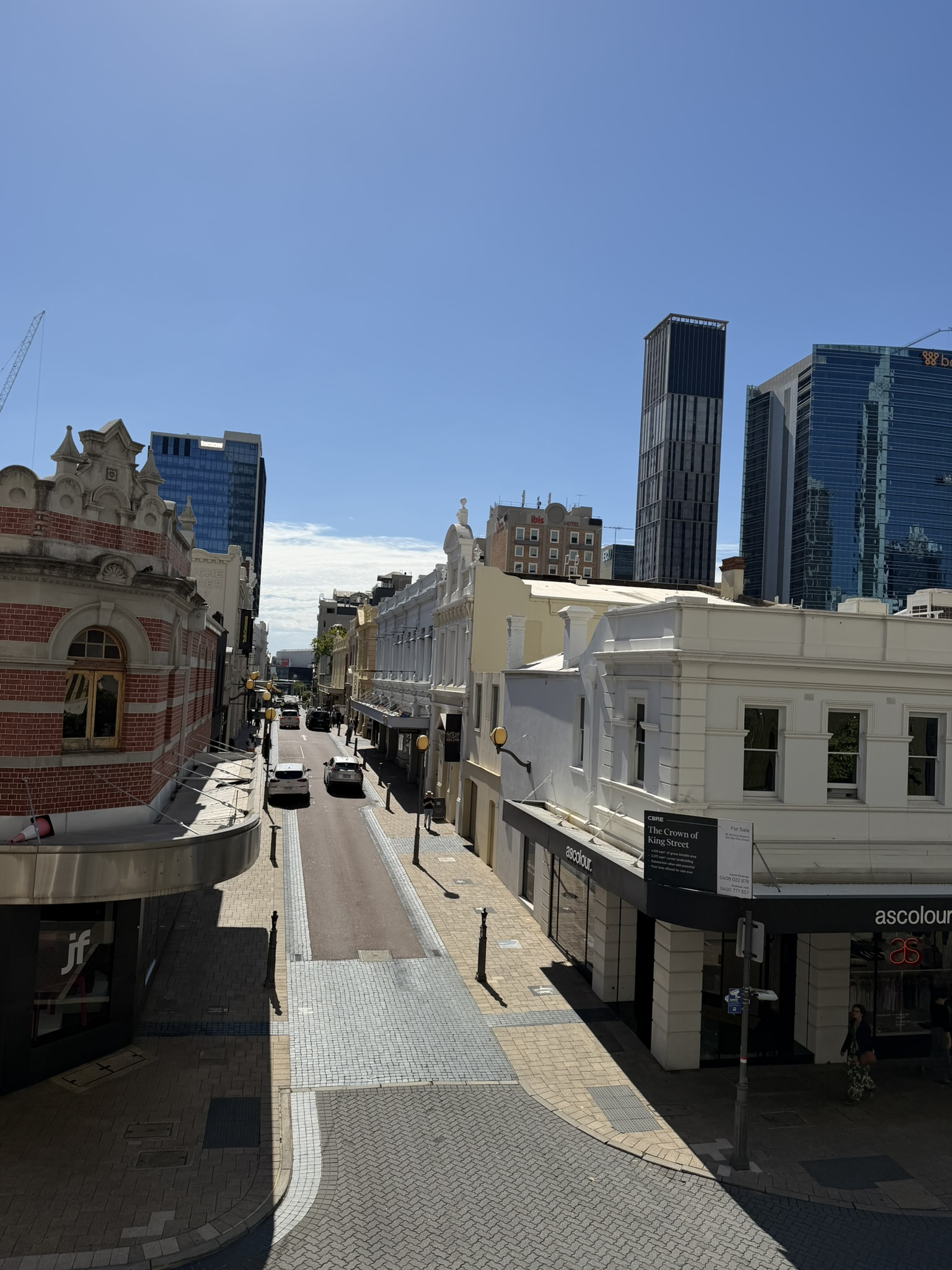
- The street as seen from the balcony of His Majesty's Theatre

General information
- Type: Street
- Length: 400 m (1,300 ft)

Major junctions
- South end: St Georges Terrace
- Hay Street, Murray Street
- North end: Wellington Street State Route 65

Location(s)
- Major suburbs: Perth

King Street is located in the central business district (CBD) of Perth, Western Australia. The street has a very European feel with its early 20th century, low-rise architecture and restored facades.

== History ==
The street was originally called King William Street and was probably named after King William IV. Its name appears for the first time on maps of the Land Department in 1840.

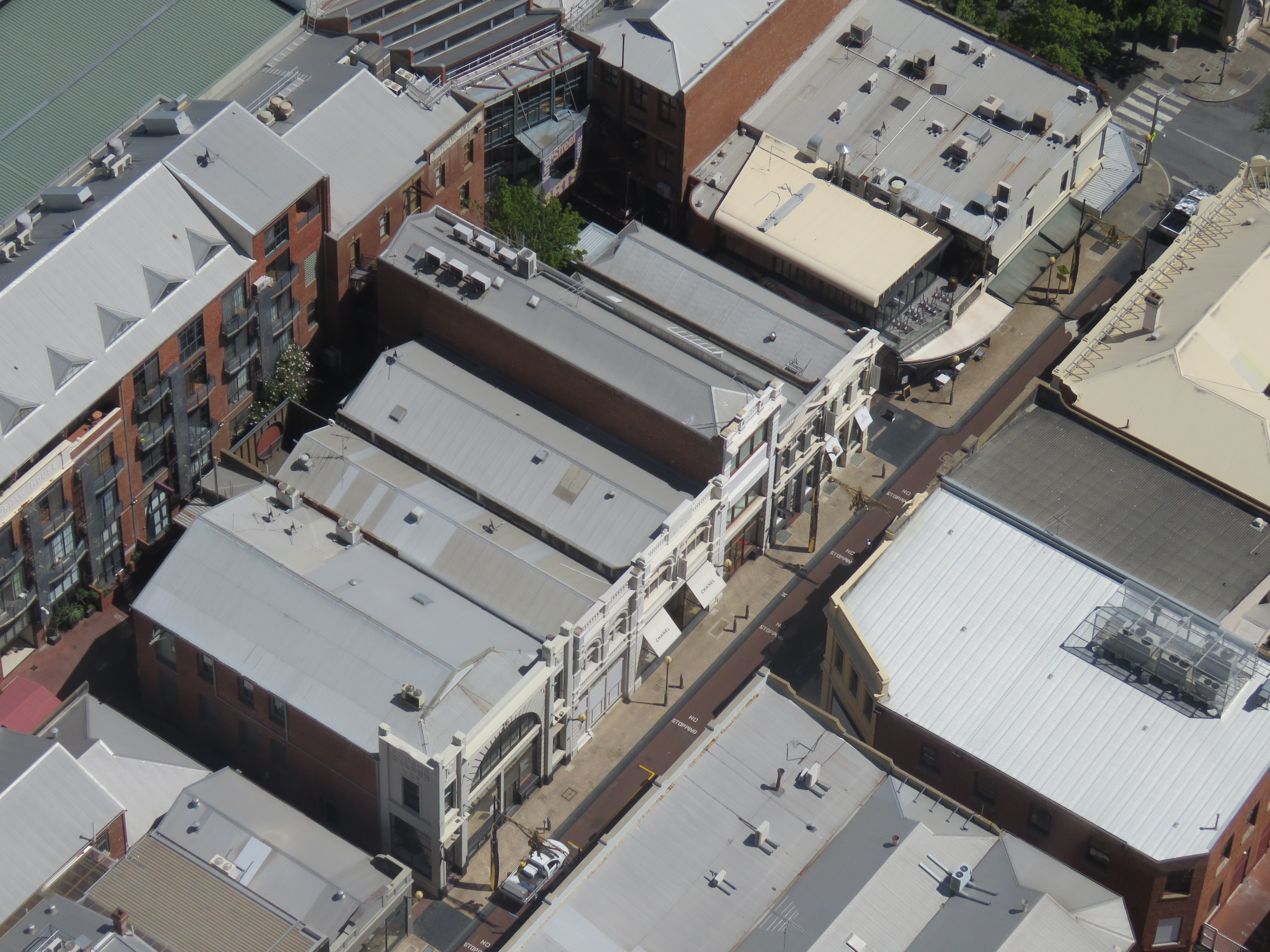
King Street between Hay and Murray Street

Commonly once known locally as the start of the "West End", it transverses two of Perth's major streets, Murray Street and Hay Street. Between the two there used to be many high-end stores such as McKilroy, Louis Vuitton, Gucci, Chanel, Prada, Kookai, Bally, Georg Jensen, Tiffany & Co., Sass and Bide, Watches of Switzerland, Zomp, Dilettante, Hunt Leather, Longchamp, and many other stores and cafes. Almost all have now left for new premises in Murray Street, Perth's new retail centre.

Other high-end retailers that once surrounded King Street on Hay Street included Burberry, Emporio Armani, Canali, Hugo Boss and Apple.

King Street's demise has been well documented and many commentators have noted that it now consists largely of empty shops.

During the 1980s the threat of road widening prompted re-evaluation of the area: the King Street Precinct was Classified by the National Trust (WA) in 1981, listed as a heritage precinct under the City Planning Scheme in 1985, and entered on the Register of the National Estate in 1986, recognising it as a significant remnant of Perth's earlier streetscapes.

The street precinct is listed with the Heritage Council of Western Australia.

== Future development ==
In February 2026, the City of Perth Council endorsed Shaping Perth City Centre: Towards 2036 and Beyond, a planning framework developed in collaboration with urban strategy firm Gehl. Among the framework's five major projects is a "Living Streets" initiative supporting the emergence of new residential neighbourhoods across the city centre, with King Street identified as one of the focus streets.
