= Theatre of Australia =

Overview of theatre in Australia

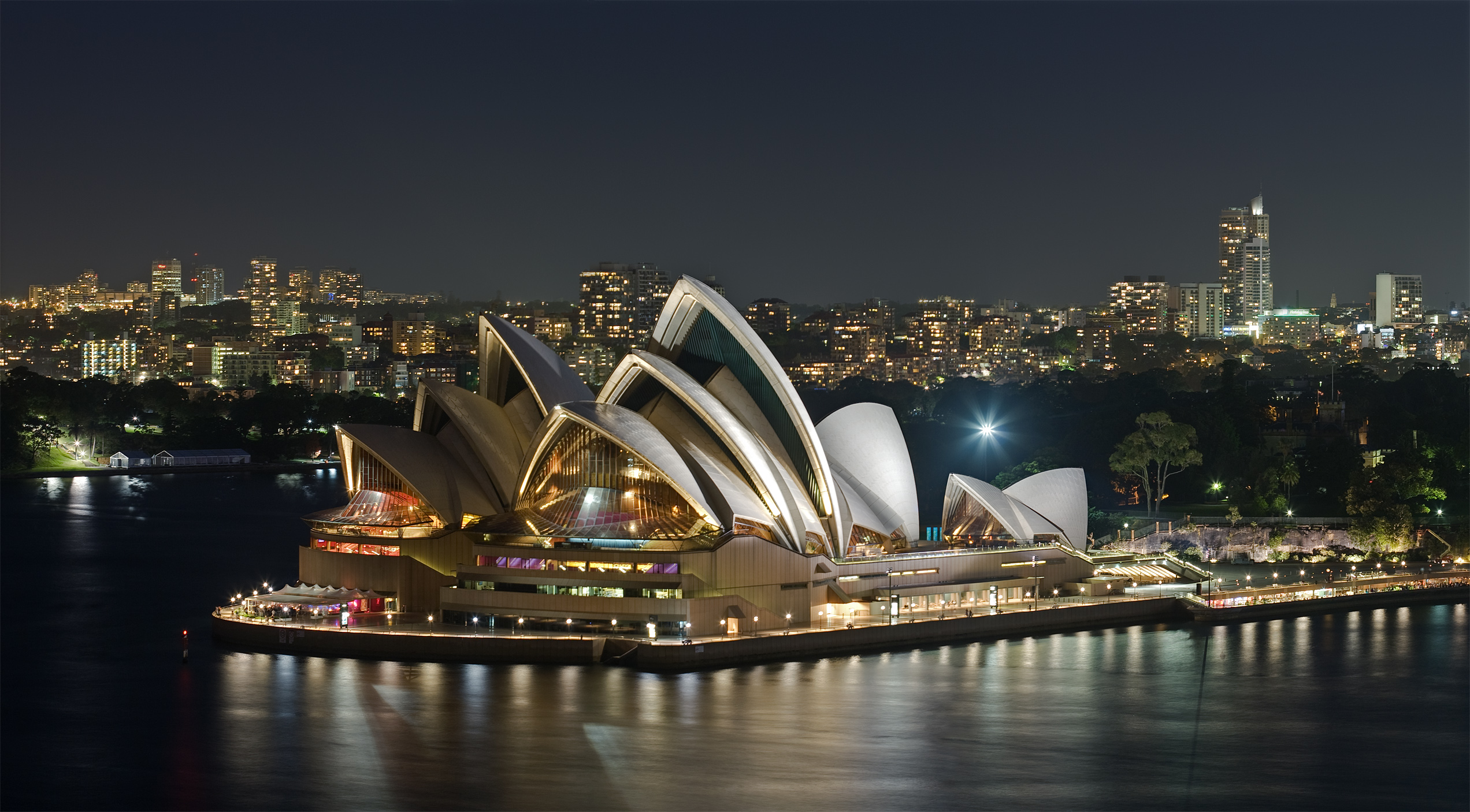
Sydney Opera House

Theatre of Australia refers to the history of the live performing arts in Australia: performed, written or produced by Australians.

There are theatrical and dramatic aspects to Indigenous Australian ceremonies such as the Corroboree, which go back more than 30,000 years. After British settlement in 1788, Australian theatrical arts became linked to the traditions of English literature and to British and Irish theatre. Australian literature and theatrical artists (including Aboriginal as well as multicultural immigrant Australians) have more recently introduced the culture of Australia and the character of a new continent to the world stage.

Like many other spheres of activity, the performing arts have been organised differently in different States. Notable theatrical complexes include the Sydney Opera House in Sydney and the Melbourne Arts Centre in Melbourne. The major teaching institutions for the dramatic arts are the National Institute of Dramatic Art in Sydney and the Western Australian Academy of Performing Arts in Perth.

== Contributing individuals ==
Very many Individuals have contributed to theatre in Australia. Some of the best-known include:

- J. C. Williamson, Betty Burstall, John Sumner, Richard Wherrett, Robin Lovejoy, Jim Sharman, John Bell, John Derum, Carillo Gantner, Aarne Neeme, Aubrey Mellor and Simon Phillips for live theatre management and direction
- Dame Judith Anderson, Frank Thring, John McCallum, Ruth Cracknell, Gordon Chater, Ron Haddrick, Robyn Nevin and Arthur Dignam as live stage actors
- Betty Roland, Mona Brand, Ray Lawler, Patrick White, David Williamson, Dorothy Hewett, Alex Buzo, John Romeril, Justin Fleming, Jack Hibberd and Nick Enwright as playwrights for theatre
- Roy Rene, George Wallace, Barry Humphries, Reg Livermore and Tim Minchin for live comedy
- Dame Nellie Melba, Dame Joan Sutherland, June Bronhill, Sir Robert Helpmann and Graeme Murphy for opera and ballet
- Gladys Moncrieff, Julie Anthony, Anthony Warlow, Nancye Hayes, Robyn Archer, Peter Allen, Colleen Hewett, Marina Prior and Tina Arena in musical theatre

Australia has contributed a high number of international movie actors. Many of these made a beginning in live theatre, and have continued to act on stage throughout their careers.

== Funding ==
In general, larger performing arts companies cannot exist without regular, guaranteed government funding, and this has been particularly true for Australia with its small population, remote from Europe and America.

The Australian Elizabethan Theatre Trust was established with the visit of Queen Elizabeth II in 1953 to bring high culture – opera and ballet – to Australia, providing a theatre "of Australians by Australians for Australians". It formed by public subscription with a matching Commonwealth government contribution, and nurtured Opera Australia and the Australian Ballet Foundation, with associated orchestras in Sydney and Melbourne.

The Australia Council for the Arts was announced in 1967, modelled on similar bodies in the major English-speaking countries. The early Australia Council grants in the 1960s were distributed through the Theatre Trust and went mostly to the largest companies. In 1973, the reformist government of Gough Whitlam doubled Arts funding and reconstituted the Council as a statutory authority consisting of seven autonomous boards, which used a peer-reviewing process to select organisations or individuals for support. The most significant Boards for the performing arts were the Theatre Arts Board and the Literature Board.

In 2014–15, a large proportion of arts funding was removed (totalling $101.8 million), throwing the sector into chaos and leading to the loss of many small to medium companies. The lost funds were returned in 2016 after intensive sector lobbying.

The COVID-19 Pandemic in 2020–21 was very damaging to live performance in Australia, as everywhere in the world, but Australian theatre did somewhat better than most.

== Early history ==
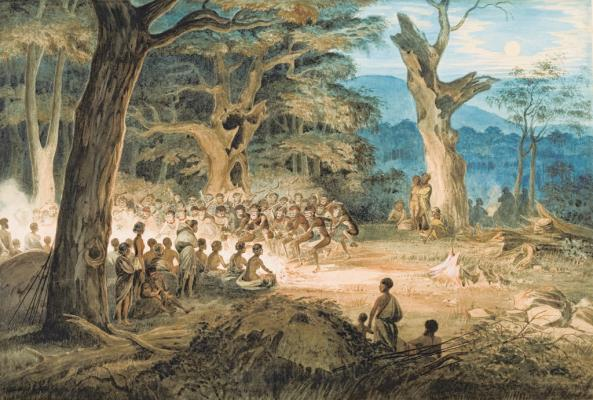
WR Thomas, A South Australian Corroboree, 1864, Art Gallery of South Australia

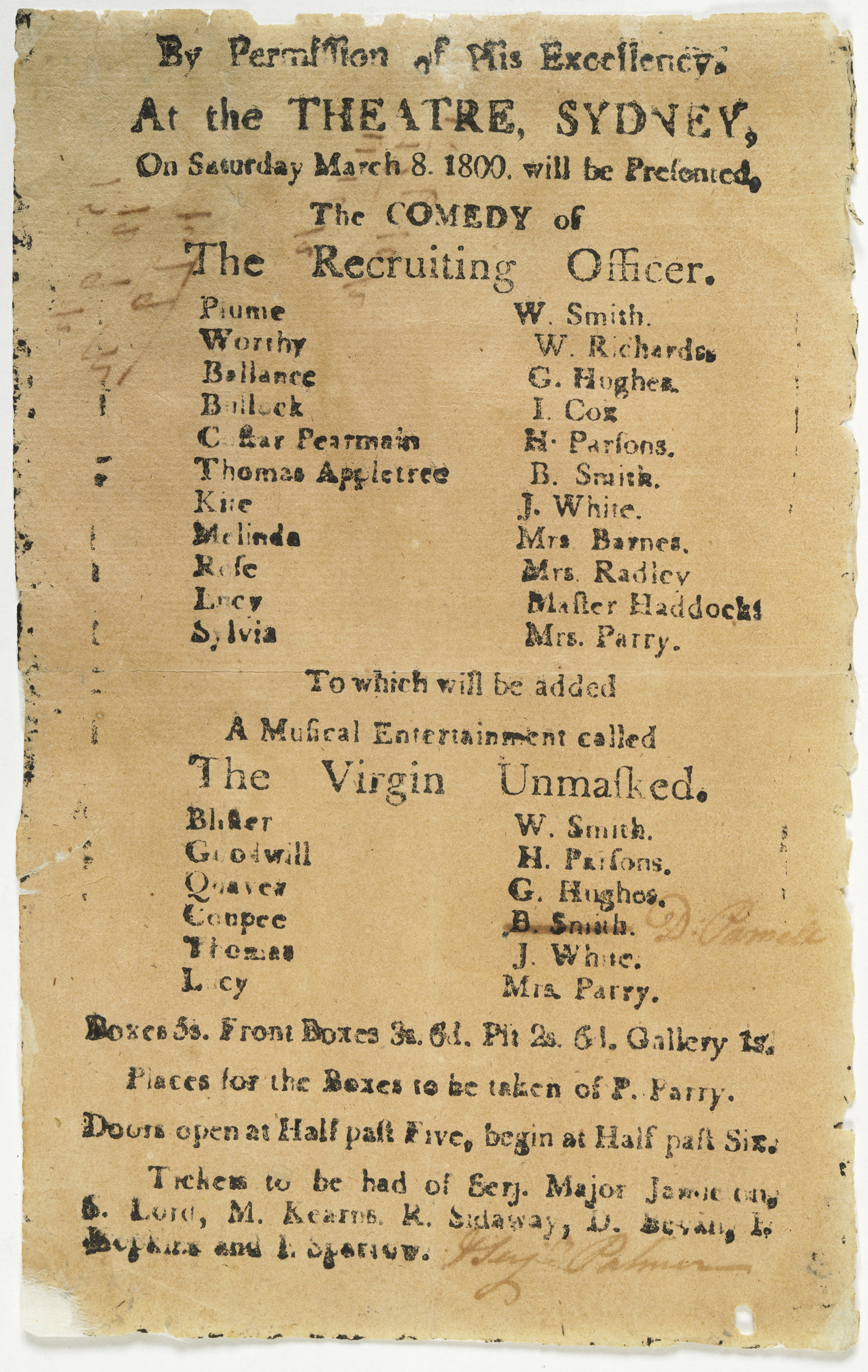
Playbill for the comedy of The recruiting officer, Sydney, 1800, State Library of New South Wales

The traditional ceremonial dances of indigenous Australians performed at corroborees comprise theatrical aspects. At a corroboree Aborigines interact with the Dreamtime through dance, music and costume and many ceremonies act out events from the Dreamtime. Corroboree in many areas have developed and adapted, integrating new themes and stories since European occupation of Australia began. Academic Maryrose Casey writes that 'Australian Aboriginal cultures are probably the most performance-based in the world – in the sense that explicit, choreographed performances were used for a vast range of social purposes from education, through to spiritual practices, arranging marriage alliances, to judicial and diplomatic functions'. Casey suggests that 'corroboree' could also be called 'aboriginal theatre'.

European theatrical traditions came to Australia with European settlement commencing in 1788 with the First Fleet. The first production, The Recruiting Officer written by George Farquhar in 1706, was performed in 1789 by convicts. The extraordinary circumstances of the foundation of Australian theatre were recounted in Thomas Keneally's novel The Playmaker – the participants were prisoners watched by sadistic guards and the leading lady was under threat of the death penalty.

The first European play to refer to Australia was Les Emigres aux Terres Australes, a French play. The earliest British play was Michael Howe, The Terror of Van Diemen's Land.

The earliest theatres copied the burlesque or vaudeville style of minor theatres in Britain, with many different independent acts including comedy, opera and circus. The burlesque form has always been popular and continues to the present day in theatre restaurants.

A theatre was opened in Sydney in 1796 by Robert Sidaway, until closed as a 'corrupting influence' – partly due to the presence of pickpockets in the audience. In major variety theatres, liquor was well-supplied, and prostitutes openly solicited customers in the auditorium of major variety theatres until the 1870s.

The first Australian play professionally produced in Sydney was The Hibernian Father.

From 1876, the American actor J. C. Williamson acted in shows in Australia. He became Australia's leading impresario when he won the right to stage Gilbert and Sullivan musicals in Australia. He brought many famous Victorian stage performers to Australia, becoming known for spectacular, large-scale productions of all kinds, mostly working in the Theatre Royal in Sydney and in Adelaide, but owning or leasing many other theatres. His theatrical empire became the largest in the world, continuing after his death in 1913 until the company closed in 1976. After 1945 the firm was best known for producing long-running American and British musicals in Australia.

After Federation in 1901, theatre productions embodied the sense of national identity that had been present in Australian literature since the 1890s. Playwrights active early in Australia include Arthur Adams, Musette Morrell, Malcolm Afford, Walter J Turner and Charles Haddon Chambers. Louis Esson, with Vance Palmer, founded the Pioneer Players, dedicated to the performance of Australian plays and the development of a national theatre. They produced 18 new Australian plays in their four years of existence.

Musicals were written by Alfred Wheeler, Arlene Sauer, and Edmund Duggan. Other examples include The Bunyip, F.F.F. and a 1918 pantomime version of Robinson Crusoe on Rainbow Island with music by six Australian composers. Operas were composed by Moritz Heuzenroeder and Arthur Chanter.

== Theatre buildings ==
Theatres are usually among the most prominent city buildings, being necessary for the performance of indoor drama, song and dance and for larger events and ceremonies. Their construction usually presents prevailing prosperity and the architectural styles of the time. The Australian gold rushes beginning in the 1850s provided funds for the construction of grand theatres in the Victorian style, along with many other civic buildings. The Western Australian goldrushes in the 1890s led to a similar construction boom in Perth.

Some of the oldest grand heritage theatrical buildings include:

- The term Theatre Royal was initially synonymous with the major theatre in each city. The first Theatre Royal was opened in Sydney in 1833. The building suffered destruction and underwent renovation several times, and the existing Theatre Royal was built on the site in 1976.
- The Theatre Royal, Hobart opened in 1837 and is the oldest still-operating theatre in Australia. Noël Coward called it a Dream Theatre and Laurence Olivier came to its defence when it was threatened with demolition in the 1940s.
- The Queen's Theatre, Adelaide opened with Shakespeare in 1841 and is today the oldest theatre on the mainland.
- The Melbourne Athenaeum was founded in 1839 as the Melbourne Mechanics' Institute, and the theatre in its present form was created in 1924.
- A theatre was built on the present site of Melbourne's Princess Theatre in 1854, with the present building constructed in 1886.
- The Victoria Theatre in Newcastle was built in 1876 and is the oldest theatre still standing in New South Wales. It was decommissioned in 1964, but in 2015 it was acquired, with plans to renovate in motion.
- His Majesty's Theatre, Perth opened in 1904. The building remains a rare example of Edwardian baroque theatrical architecture in Australia.

In the period between the Wars, elaborate cinemas were constructed, often in the Art Deco style. When cinemas were no longer popular, these buildings were sometimes repurposed as general theatres for performances and community events. The Capitol Theatre in Sydney had a long history as a covered market, a circus and a cinema before becoming a theatre for major musicals in 1972. The State Theatre (renamed the Forum in 1963) and the Regent Theatre both opened in Melbourne in 1929, originally as cinemas, while the Astor Theatre opened in 1939. The Palais Theatre, St Kilda is still the largest seated theatre in Australia,. Several art deco picture palaces, now theatres, opened in Perth in the inter-war years – the Regal in Subiaco in 1937 and the Astor in Mount Lawley.

From the 1960s, major cities across Australia developed new government-owned performing arts centres, often housing not-for-profit theatre, opera and dance companies. Examples include the Sydney Opera House, the Arts Centre Melbourne, the Adelaide Festival Centre, the Canberra Theatre Centre and the Queensland Performing Arts Centre in Brisbane.

The Arts Centre Melbourne in the Melbourne Arts Precinct was designed by architect Sir Roy Grounds. The masterplan for the complex was approved in 1960, and construction of the Arts Centre began in 1973. The complex opened in stages, with Hamer Hall opening in 1982, and the Theatres Building opening in 1984. The centre now hosts regular performances by Opera Australia, The Australian Ballet, the Melbourne Theatre Company and Melbourne Symphony Orchestra as well as a large number of Australian and international performances and production companies.

In 1973, the Sydney Opera House, a World Heritage site, opened. It is the home of the Australian Ballet, Opera Australia and the Sydney Symphony Orchestra, and has a drama theatre and other facilities. With its Sydney Harbour site and expressionist design, it is Australia's most visited tourist attraction.

Also opening in 1973, the Adelaide Festival Centre was Australia's first multi-purpose art centre, and it includes three theatres. It hosts the Adelaide Festival and several other festivals, and it is home to the major State performing arts groups.

Most major regional centres and many outer metropolitan areas have a professional-standard performing arts centre typically run by the local council, either newly built such as the Riverside Theatres Parramatta, the Wagga Wagga Civic Theatre or the Frankston Arts Centre, or refurbishment of heritage theatres or cinemas such as the Newcastle Civic Theatre, the Theatre Royal in Hobart or the Empire Theatre in Toowoomba.

Non-establishment theatres like the New Theatre in Newtown, Sydney have catered to a more radical clientele. The New Theatre was originally established in 1932 as part of the international New Theatre movement affiliated with Communist parties, and is the oldest theatre company in continuous production. Its most famous production was Reedy River in 1953 based on the 1891 Australian Shearer's Strike, which helped to launch the 1950s Folk Music Revival. Melbourne also had a New Theatre, founded by radical playwright Betty Roland in 1936. It ran the first play supporting Indigenous Australians, White Justice, about the Pilbara strike, and it was the first theatre to stage Brecht.

For a long time, innovative theatre was only staged by student companies in theatres associated with university precincts. Some of the better-known university performing arts theatres are:

- Union House Theatre at the University of Melbourne
- The Seymour Centre at the University of Sydney
- The Ian Potter Centre, the George Jenkins Theatre and the Robert Blackwood Hall at Monash University
- The Dolphin, Octagon and New Fortune theatres at the University of Western Australia,

There are many smaller theatres associated with particular theatre companies. A full list of existing major theatres in each city is given below,

== Drama ==
=== Theatre companies ===
Theatre companies produce most of the drama in Australia. If successful, they operate under various sustainable business models. Most companies have been associated with a single theatre, but others perform in multiple venues. Resident professional theatre companies produce main-stage seasons of Australian and international plays and, occasionally, musicals.

No theatre company operates out of more than one city. Some of the major companies include:

==== Sydney ====
- The Old Tote Theatre Company was originally established in 1963 as the theatre company for NIDA. It separated from NIDA in 1967, and after a grant from the Australian Council for the Arts, aimed to become a State theatre company. In that capacity it employed most of the best-loved actors and directors of New South Wales. In 1978 it overstretched its capacity and went into liquidation.
- Its role was taken by the Sydney Theatre Company under Richard Wherrett, now one of Australia's foremost theatre companies. It operates from The Wharf Theatre near The Rocks, as well as from the Sydney Theatre and the Sydney Opera House Drama Theatre.
- The tiny Jane Street Theatre was a joint venture of NIDA, the Old Tote and others in 1966. It was an early attempt to foster original Australian work, with a resident company of young professionals. It showcased many new playwrights, directors and actors.
- The Nimrod Theatre was established in Kings Cross by John Bell and Richard Wherrett in 1970 as a venue for new Australian theatre. Until it dissolved in 1988, it was said to have shown more good new Australian drama than any other company, and virtually all significant Australian actors of the period were alumni. It moved to the Belvoir St Theatre in Surry Hills in 1974. The Belvoir company took over this theatre in 1985.
- The Bell Shakespeare Company was created in 1990 by John Bell. The company specialises in the works of William Shakespeare. It is Australia's only national touring theatre company, touring each Australian state in each year.
- The Ensemble Theatre is Australia's longest continuously running theatre company, founded by the American director and method actor Hayes Gordon in 1958 on Sydney's North Shore. The very popular actress Lorraine Bayly was a founder, and performed here until 2003.
- The Griffin Theatre Company was founded in Sydney in 1979 and is based at the Stables Theatre in Kings Cross. It is exclusively devoted to the development and staging of new Australian writing. Cate Blanchett began her professional career here.
- The Genesian Theatre is an amateur company formed in 1944 by members of the Sydney Catholic Youth Organisation, and is one of Australia's oldest theatrical groups. It has since evolved into a community theatre.

==== Melbourne ====
- The Melbourne Theatre Company, originally the Union Theatre Repertory Company, was formed in 1953 by John Sumner, It is a department of the University of Melbourne. It is Australia's oldest fully professional theatre company, and one of the largest in the world. It operates from a conservative middle-class subscriber base and mostly produces stage classics. However it occasionally stages more risky works, introducing newer authors to mainstream Melbourne audiences.
- The La Mama Theatre near the University of Melbourne was created by director Betty Burstall in 1967 to recreate the vibrancy and immediacy of the small on-off Broadway ventures in New York. The production of Australian plays was almost non-existent at the time, and La Mama became the venue for the performance of new experimental Australian theatre. In the first two years, twenty-five new Australian plays premiered there. It went on to become the Australian Performing Group, established by Graeme Blundell. This group was based at the closely associated Pram Factory.which nurtured New Left politics, comedy, popular theatre, new Australian writing, puppetry and circus.The not-for-profit La Mama model of giving artists upfront funding to present work in a rent-free venue with 80% box-office return is unique. La Mama also uses the nearby Carlton Courthouse Theatre.
- The Playbox Theatre Company was founded by Carillo Gantner of the Myer Dynasty in 1976. It has always been dedicated to supporting Australian playwrights and producing new Australian plays. After its original theatre burned down in 1984, it moved to the Malthouse Theatre in the Melbourne Arts Precinct. As well as drama, it shows music theatre, contemporary dance and comedy.

==== Brisbane ====
- La Boite Theatre Company was originally an amateur repertory company. It was established in 1925 and is Australia's longest running theatrical company. By 1980 it had Australia Council funding and became "pro-am", with productions every night of the theatrical year. It is home to the Roundhouse Theatre, Australia's only purpose-built theatre-in-the round.
- The Queensland Theatre Company in South Brisbane runs largely on philanthropic donations.

==== Canberra ====
- The Canberra Repertory Society is an amateur company founded in 1932, with more than 460 productions to its credit.

==== Perth ====
- The Black Swan State Theatre Company is resident in the State Theatre Centre of WA. It was founded in 1991, and runs on subscription. It supports an emerging writers' group and resident artists. Prior to the construction of the Theatre Centre, the main theatre was the Playhouse, now demolished, with its resident National Theatre Company (until 1984), managed by the Perth Theatre Trust. In the late 1980s, this company was producing up to 14 plays by Western Australians per year.
- At the University of Western Australia, the Graduate Dramatic Society is a not-for-profit established in 1952, The University Dramatic Society is student-run and was established in 1923. The Perth playwright Dorothy Hewett's plays were first performed by these groups.

==== Adelaide ====
- The State Theatre Company of South Australia is the leading professional company
- Adelaide Theatre is the oldest surviving repertory theatre in the Southern Hemisphere, established in 1908.

Some professional companies focus on particular genres like classical theatre (Bell Shakespeare), theatre for young people (Windmill, Barking Gecko, Patch, Arena, Monkey Baa), music theatre (The Production Company, Harvest Rain) or circus and physical theatre (Circa, Circus Oz). The Adelaide Theatre Group in the 1980s became the most prominent in experimenting with new and established plays at the Sheridan Theatre. Other companies specialise in areas such as artists with disability (Back to Back), Indigenous artists (see below) or specific communities (Urban Theatre Projects, Big hART).

=== Theatrical training ===
The major training centre for young actors in Australia is the National Institute of Dramatic Art (NIDA) at the University of New South Wales, established in 1958. The list of famous alumni include Cate Blanchett, Toni Collette, Mel Gibson and Baz Luhrmann.

The other dedicated university training centre is the Western Australian Academy of Performing Arts (WAAPA) at Edith Cowan University, established in 1980. As an elite course it accepts only 18 students per year. Famous alumni include Hugh Jackman and Tim Minchin.

As well, almost all Australian universities offer degree and diploma courses in theatre and drama studies.

All States have a range of community-based organisations and colleges for training in theatre. Youth-based companies include the PACT Centre for Emerging Artists in Sydney, St Martins Youth Arts Centre in Melbourne, and the Windmill Theatre Company in Adelaide. The Eora Centre in Redfern, Sydney has been a centre for contemporary visual and performing arts and Aboriginal studies since it was established in July 1984.

=== Playwrights and plays ===
Betty Roland has been called the first "real dramatist" in Australia. Her early plays such as Touch of Silk in 1928, were mostly romantic drama or comedy, but her later work with New Theatre was agitprop and highly political. She also wrote novels, autobiography and film, radio and TV scrips, including the book for Australia's first talking movie Spur of the Moment. Another feminist playwright of the Left around the same time was Dymphna Cusack, who built an international reputation across Europe in leftist communities.

Mona Brand was also associated with the New Theatre and her 28 plays mostly had political messages. From 1950 to 1980 she had more plays put on abroad than any other Australian, although she never had a professional production in Australia.

Up until the 1950s and beyond, Australian actors were trained in Britain and took on typical British upper-class accents. Many had difficulty using the Australian accent and vernacular, even into the 1970s. The Summer of the Seventeenth Doll by Ray Lawler was a watershed for Australian theatre, openly and authentically portraying distinctly Australian life and characters who had Australian accents. It was first performed at the Union Theatre in Melbourne in 1955. It was taken up by the Australian Elizabethan Theatre Trust and presented in all Australian States as well as London and New York. It has become a beloved Australian play, and has been adapted for film, TV and opera.

Some plays tackled Australia's myths critically. In The One Day of the Year, Alan Seymour studied the paradoxical nature of the ANZAC Day commemoration by Australians of the defeat of the Battle of Gallipoli. The first production was by the Adelaide Theatre group in 1960, and many of those involved received death threats.

A considerable expansion of Australian theatre began in the 1970s (sometimes called a 'New Wave') with the works of writers including David Williamson, Dorothy Hewett, John Romeril, Alex Buzo, Barry Oakley, Jack Hibberd, and Alma de Groen. Many of these playwrights debuted at La Mama in Melbourne or the Nimrod in Sydney, and went on to present works in mainstream venues.

David Williamson has been the most successful playwright in Australia's history. He has written over 60 plays, of which The Club has been staged over 130 times while The Removalists and Don's Party have been staged over 50 times, making these the most popular Australian plays of all time. These three plays, and The Coming of Stork, Travelling North and The Perfectionist, were adapted as movies. Williamson also collaborated on high-profile film scripts including Eliza Frazer, Gallipoli, The Year of Living Dangerously and Phar Lap. He was declared the Senior Australian of the Year in 2012.

Unlike in Europe, most original theatre in Australia has been naturalistic, though Patrick White, Dymphna Cusack and Douglas Stewart included non-naturalistic and poetic elements in their plays. From 1969, a series of plays by the Western Australian poet, playwright and novelist Dorothy Hewett introduced home-grown Expressionist or Epic theatre to Australia, with its whirl of disparate theatrical elements. Hewett wrote a number of plays specifically for the open-air New Fortune Theatre at the University of Western Australia, including Australia's first "Second Wave Feminist" play The Chapel Perilous in 1971. Music has featured extensively in Hewett's plays: seven of her 22 plays were musicals and employed theatre composers such as Jim Cotter.

Nick Enright began as an actor and director, but won the Major AWGIE Award from the Australian Writers Guild four times for plays and adaptations. He was happy to take his plays on tour; the play Daylight Saving played in 45 theatres in a round-Australia odyssey during 2000–01. His adaptation of Tim Winton's Cloudstreet received box office and critical acclaim, and went on tour in Australia, at the Festival of Dublin, and in London. He wrote the lyrics and book for a number of musicals, including The Boy from Oz about Peter Allen. Enright died of melanoma at age 52.

=== Actors ===
Several Australian drama actors were famous at home or played major roles abroad.

- Dame Judith Anderson took many leading roles on Broadway and the Old Vic from the 1920s, She is considered one of the 20th century's greatest classical stage actors, even playing Hamlet in her seventies during a national tour of the USA.
- Sir Robert Helpmann the ballet dancer took leading roles in British theatre in the 1940s.
- Frank Thring played long-running character roles in major productions in Australia and Britain from 1945, and gained fame in the movie Ben Hur and in Hollywood epics of the 1950s and 1960s.
- John McCallum did seasons in Britain from 1939, acted in movies after 1947, and became joint Director of J.C. Williamsons in Australia in 1958. He was married to the British entertainer and film star Googie Withers, who played many stage leads in Australia. He received the JC Williamson Award for lifetime achievement.

From the 1950s, actors could make a career in Australia. Some of the most famous and respected have been:

- Ruth Cracknell, a character actor and comedian, acted for most of the major theatre companies and on television and films.
- Gordon Chater arrived in Australia after World War II, and was a stage, radio and TV personality. He toured successfully with the play The Elocution of Benjamin Franklin in the 1970s.
- Ron Haddrick played five seasons in Stratford-on-Avon with Britain's top actors, then played in over forty productions at the Old Tote.
- Robyn Nevin has directed more than 30 productions and acted in more than 80 plays.
- John Bell spent five years with the Royal Shakespeare Company, co-founded the Nimrod Theatre Company in 1970, and founded Bell Shakespeare in 1990. He has been voted a National Living Treasure for the National Trust by public nomination

From the 1980s, Australian actors began to garner leads and action hero roles in Hollywood. Probably the best known internationally as A-list celebrities and Oscar winners are Cate Blanchett, Nicole Kidman, Mel Gibson, Russell Crowe and Heath Ledger.

==== Cross-fertilization with cinema and TV ====
Film and television have been more lucratively funded than live stage, and have provided a career vehicle for aspiring actors and scriptwriters. Conversely, movie stars with an interest in live theatre have headlined important stage productions as a drawcard. Australian movie or TV stars that have made significant contributions to live theatre in Australia and abroad include Peter Finch, Michael Caton, Jacki Weaver, Helen Morse, Wendy Hughes, Bryan Brown, Garry McDonald, Geoffrey Rush, Judy Davis, Mel Gibson, Sigrid Thornton, Hugo Weaving, Greta Scacchi, Nicole Kidman, Hugh Jackman, Cate Blanchett and Toni Collette.

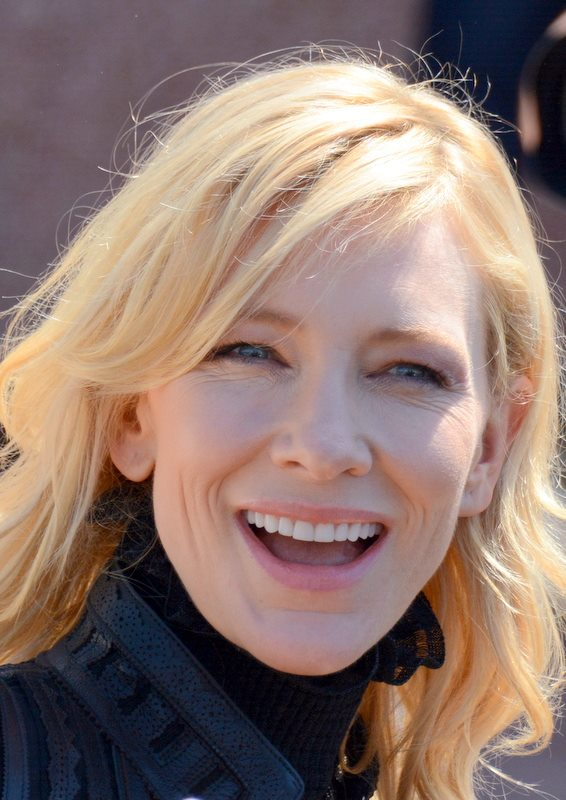
Cate Blanchett of the Sydney Theatre Company.

As an example of cross-fertilisation between the genres, in 1979, two impoverished young Sydney actors, Mel Gibson and Geoffrey Rush, shared a flat and co-starred in a local production of Waiting for Godot. Gibson had studied at NIDA and made his stage debut alongside classmate Judy Davis in a 1976 production of Romeo and Juliet, before becoming internationally known in the Mad Max and Gallipoli films. Rush joined Jim Sharman's Lighthouse Theatre troupe in the 1980s and built a reputation as one of Australia's leading stage actors before becoming known internationally in film.

Conversely, some of the bigger theatre companies have consistently employed film actors. Players associated with the Sydney Theatre Company include Mel Gibson, Judy Davis, Hugo Weaving, Geoffrey Rush and Toni Collette.

=== Festivals and conferences ===
Festivals may be the oldest form of drama, where the larger gathering of people encourages display in costume and rehearsed performance. In Australia they are important showcases to a wider range of people than usual. The major cultural festivals have been the Perth International Arts Festival (Australia's longest running cultural festival, first held in 1953) the Adelaide Festival of the Arts (from 1960), the Melbourne International Arts Festival (from 1973) the Sydney Festival (from 1977), the Darwin Festival (from 1978) and the Brisbane Festival (from 1996). These larger festivals usually feature a mix of overseas and Australian acts of all kinds. There are many smaller specialist festivals and regional festivals in Australia.

Arts conferences have been an important way to showcase new work and to meet others and share ideas. The National Playwrights Conference, associated with the Australian National Playwrights Centre, which ran from 1972 to 2006, became a cornerstone of the industry. A national Play Festival began ran from 2012 to 2019 under the aegis of the short-lived Playwriting Australia. A new Playwrights Conference began in 2022, presented by Currency Press.

From the 1960s to the 1980s, Australian Universities Drama Festivals provided an opportunity for tertiary students to present plays to each other, learning playcrafting and direction. One of the more famous gatherings was in 1963, when Germaine Greer acted in Brecht's Mother Courage and the radical playwright Fernando Arribal was brought from Paris.

== Musical theatre ==
Musical theatre has always been very popular in Australia, though most often this has meant large-scale productions of British or American musicals headlined by international stars. J C Williamsons brought Gilbert and Sullivan productions from 1879 to 1963. Broadway musicals from Rodgers and Hammerstein began long runs from 1949, and then Andrew Lloyd Webber musicals from the 1970s. Rock opera productions such as Hair, Godspell, Jesus Christ Superstar and the Rocky Horror Show gave a major boost to popular music talent, and performers such as Marcia Hines, Reg Livermore, and Colleen Hewett became national names through their involvement. Musical biographies of Australian music singers Peter Allen (The Boy From Oz in 1998) and Johnny O'Keefe (Shout! The Legend of The Wild One) attracted big audiences in the 1990s.

Australian theatrical musicals where authorship was granted to the scriptwriter rather than the composer or a duo, such as The Legend of King O'Malley by Bob Ellis, the Man from Mukinupin by Dorothy Hewett, the Sapphires by Tony Briggs, Bran Nue Day by Jimmy Chi and Miracle City and Summer Rain, by Nick Enright, signalled a more radical political role for musical theatre.

=== Performers ===
- Gladys Moncrieff "the Australian Wonder Child" was a child star. As an adult, "Our Glad" performed in light opera in the 1920s and was known as "Australia's Queen of Song". She was very active raising funds for charities in World War II.
- Nancye Hayes, also "Australia's queen of song and dance", performed many leading roles in musicals, including Australian-written musicals, and won many awards. She was also very active in television.
- Julie Anthony performed in musicals and light opera, and won the Mo Awards 13 times as Best Vocal Performance or Entertainer of the Year.
- Anthony Warlow had lead roles in many musicals, received 11 Mo Awards between 1990 and 2008, and was declared a National Living Treasure.
- Reg Livermore first worked with Philip Street regulars, and on TV, including the Mavis Bramston Show. He starred in the long-running musical Hair in 1970, followed by the cult Rocky Horror Show. He then toured with three of his own one-man shows, especially the high camp Betty Blokkbuster Follies. Unlike Humphries, he was not popular in the USA or Britain, where he was booed off the stage.
- Robyn Archer began as a folk music performer, but in 1974 she became involved with the musical theatre of Brecht and German-style cabaret. From the late 1970s she toured with a series of one woman shows such as A Star is Torn (1979) which moved to London's West End. Archer has devised many works for the stage, and in 2022–23 she has toured with An Australian Songbook. She also acted as a director of many festivals, including the National Festival of Australian Theatre from 1993 to 1995, the Adelaide and Melbourne Arts Festivals between 1998 and 2004, and in Liverpool, England with the European Capital of Culture 2008.

== Comedy, circus and puppetry ==
=== Comedy ===
For much of Australia's early history, touring theatre companies brought variety theatre and vaudeville to regional audiences. Vaudeville consisted of a series of separate acts, including light theatre, comedy and song. Travelling circuits like Brennan-Fullers, which featured illusionists, jugglers, singers and acrobats, or the Tivoli circuit, operating around the Tivoli theatres in four states, were extremely popular.

The Tivoli Theatre or Adelphi Theatre in Sydney presented vaudeville between 1912 and 1966 until television made them no longer profitable. Stars of the Tivoli included Roy Rene. who had created the comic character Mo McCackie from 1916, in white and black makeup. Lecherous, leering and ribald, Mo epitomised the Australian "lair", always trying to "make a quid" or to "knock off a sheila". He played to packed houses right through the war years, and gained a nationwide audience through radio.

George Wallace also began his career in a duo act, creating a "wharfie" character, but he became popular as a solo act in the Depression years. Although uneducated, he wrote all his own material, and could sing and dance. After headlining in five movies, he was known as Australia's biggest film star.

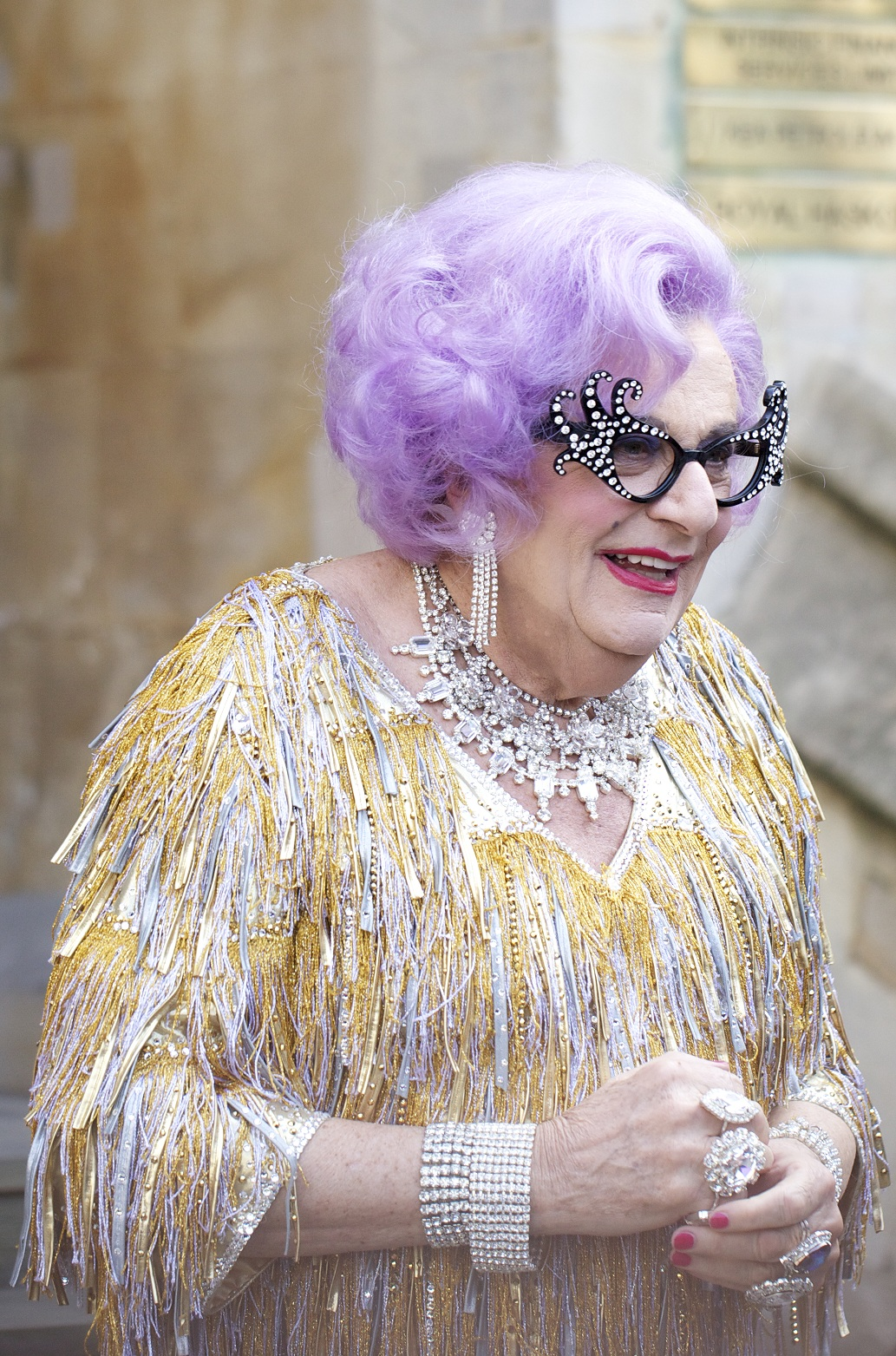
Dame Edna Everage, comic creation of Barry Humphries, had her stage debut in Melbourne in the 1950s and has featured at the West End and Broadway.

Barry Humphries has been Australia's most famous comic As a follower of the absurdist art movement Dada. his many experiments in anarchy and visual satire have been legendary. Amongst many stage characters, he created Edna Everage from Moonee Ponds, who became a household name with her outrageous Australian expressions, audience-shaming and gladioli-waving. Another character, Barry McKenzie, began as a popular comic strip, and actually poked fun at the British while featuring a boorish innocent epitomising the British view of Australians. Humphries was just as popular in England as Australia, and Edna Everage was created a Dame by the Queen. Humphries also achieved success in the US with tours on Broadway and television appearances. He was a stalwart of British and Australian theatre and was honoured in both nations.

The Philip Street Theatre in Sydney, operating from 1954 to 1971, featured intimate satirical revue productions. Humphries and most other significant Australian comedy actors were alumni. The Mavis Bramston Show, Australia's first satirical sketch comedy topical satire TV series, sprang from Philip Street actors.

The Last Laugh, in Collingwood and then at the Athenaeum Theatre, became Australia's prime location for alternative and stand-up comedy, often featuring genuine cabaret acts in the European style. Some of Australia's best comedians made their start in this venue. Melbourne also had a tradition for experimenting with unusual comedy venues, such as mobile trams and trains. John Pinder, owner of the Last Laugh, launched the Melbourne International Comedy Festival, one of the three largest comedy festivals in the world.

=== Circus ===
Vaudeville often contained circus performers, but dedicated travelling circuses were also a regular annual feature in the suburbs and seaside resorts, with Big Top tents, ringmasters, acrobatic, animal and clown acts. Wirth's Circus was billed for eighty years as Australia's own "Greatest Show on Earth" from 1882 to 1963. It took over the present Melbourne Arts Centre site as Olympia Circus from 1902, and occupied a permanent location in Sydney's Haymarket. The circus also toured through the Pacific. Other important circuses were Ashtons Circus, which was founded in Tasmania in 1847 and is one of the longest lasting in the world, run by the sixth generation of Ashtons. Bullen's Circus ran from 1920 to 1969, and featured a large elephant herd.

Television spelled the demise of the original travelling shows, but theatre-based circuses began to appear from the 1970s, doubling as circus schools. The Flying Fruit Fly Circus formed from the Victorian College of the Arts Drama School in 1979. Circus Oz emerged from the Australian Performing Group in 1978 and played long seasons at the Last Laugh; the troupe is currently threatened with closure.

Traditional travelling circuses include the Stardust Circus, which up till 2021 was the last circus to feature wild animal acts, and a number of other small single-family operations.

=== Puppetry ===
The first Australian marionette company was Webb's Royal Marionettes, which formed out of a visiting British company and toured from 1876 to 1887. Puppetry guilds were founded in Sydney and Melbourne in the 1940s. The first major Australian company was the Tintookies, which was founded by Peter Scriven in 1956 under the auspices of the Elizabethan Theatre Trust. It toured Australia and South-east Asia with large scale-shows having an overtly Australian content.

The Australia Council offered funding for puppetry from its inception, and other companies including the Queensland Marionette Theatre, the Tasmanian Puppet Theatre (1976), Polyglot Puppet Company, Terrapin Puppet Theatre and Spare Parts puppet theatre. The Dead Puppet Society, from Queensland but with an international reach, uses computer-designed and laser cut puppets and features multi-genre productions in design-led theatre.

Small one and two person puppet shows operate without subsidy and tour to schools.

== Indigenous theatre ==
During the 1940s, John Antill composed the music for his Corroboree ballet based on the Aboriginal corroboree. The production was first performed in 1946 and toured Australia during the 1950s and featured on the schedule of Queen Elizabeth II's first Royal Tour of Australia in 1954. It represents an early example of the fusion of Western and Aboriginal theatrical forms in Australia – now regularly expressed in the work of the Bangarra Dance Theatre and other indigenous troupes.

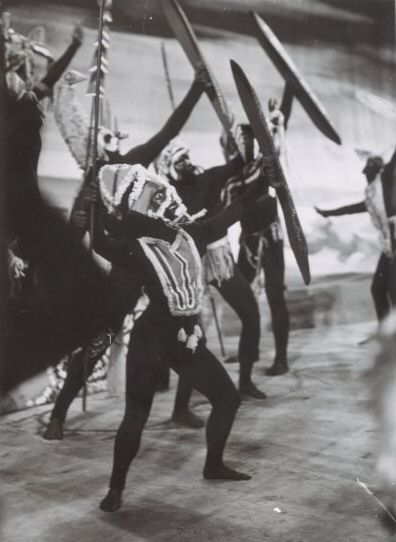
A ballet performance of John Antill's Corroboree

In the late 1960s and early 1970s, street theatre, guerrilla theatre and other performances put on by the Aboriginal community were used as a form of political protest. Brian Syron, actor, director and teacher, was a pioneer of Aboriginal theatre from the 1960s onwards. Melbourne's Nindethana Theatre was Australia's first Aboriginal theatre company, co-founded by Bob Maza and Uncle Jack Charles in 1971. Maza also helped set up National Black Theatre in Redfern, Sydney, in 1972. Playwrights such as Kevin Gilbert, Jack Davis, Bobby Merritt and Kath Oodgeroo Noonuccal Walker wrote works which were by, about and for Aboriginal people, and Harry and Bindi Williams, Gary Foley and Paul Coe added to the content and drive which helped "Blak" theatre production. Rhoda Roberts and Justine Saunders were two other driving forces, as in the creation of the Aboriginal National Theatre Trust, which emerged from the first National Black Playwright's Conference in 1987.

As of 2020 there are several Indigenous theatre companies in existence, including the Yirra Yaakin in Perth, Ilbijerri in Melbourne (led by Maza's daughter, Rachael), and Moogahlin Performing Arts, based in Sydney's Carriageworks. The Bangarra Dance Theatre is known worldwide, BlakDance is another pathway for Indigenous dancers, and Marrugeku, "Australia's Leading Indigenous Intercultural Dance Theatre", has bases on both Sydney Carriageworks and in Broome, Western Australia. The Aboriginal Centre for the Performing Arts in Brisbane provides a pathway for young Indigenous performers. Writer/performers such as Nakkiah Lui, Leah Purcell and others continue to produce work for stage.

Ngapartji Ngapartji, by Scott Rankin and Trevor Jamieson, recounts the story of the effects on the Pitjantjatjara people of nuclear testing in the Western Desert during the Cold War. It is an example of the contemporary fusion of traditions of drama in Australia with Pitjantjatjara actors being supported by a multicultural cast of Greek, Afghan, Japanese and New Zealand heritage.

== Opera, ballet and dance ==
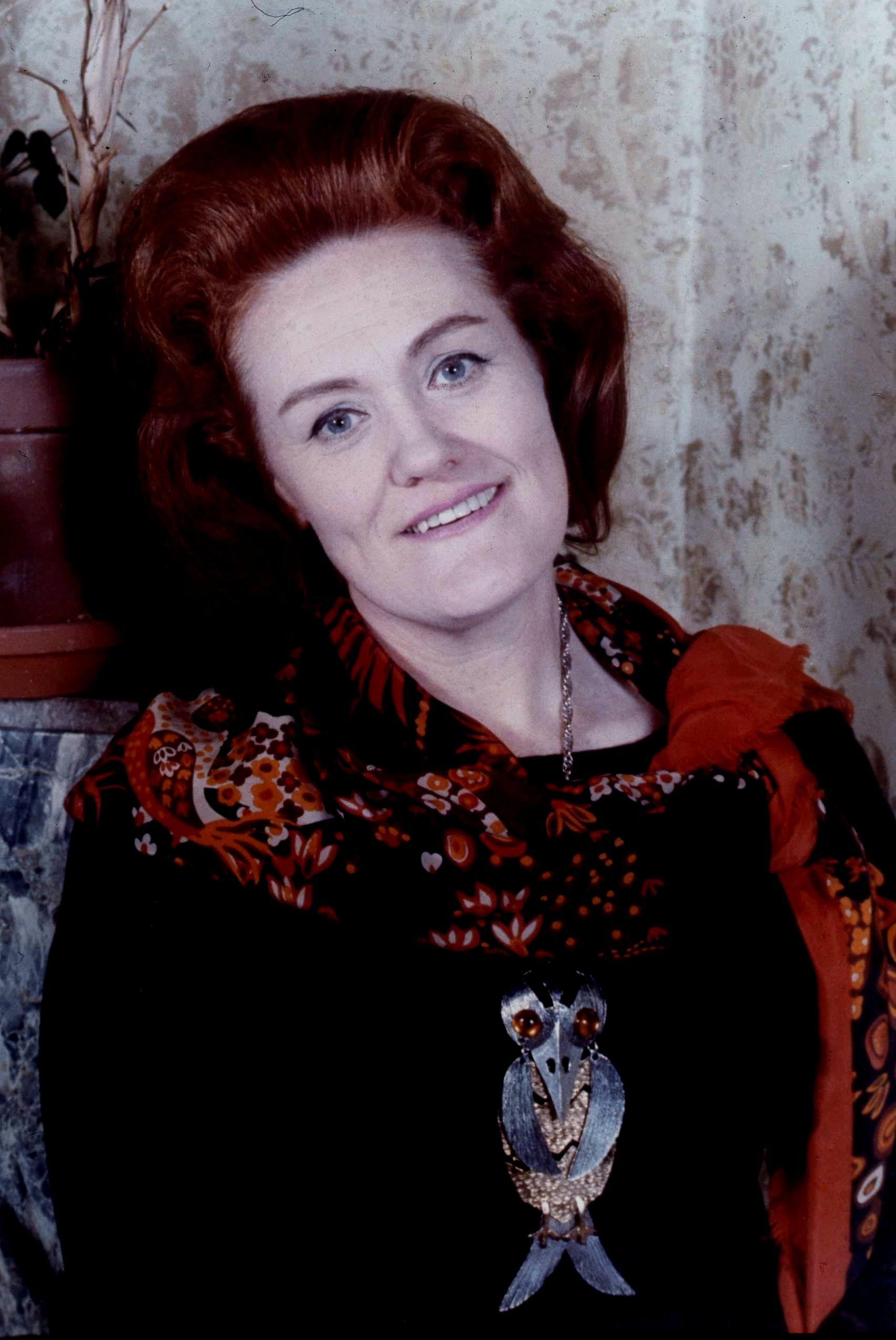
Dame Joan Sutherland of Opera Australia.

=== Opera ===
Opera was not initially regarded as "high culture" and was performed with other musical and comedy material as part of variety entertainment. In the 1820s several operas were staged by convicts at the Emu Plains Prison Farm. The Theatre Royal and the Royal Victoria Theatre presented operas from 1832.

Tours by international opera companies began after the Gold Rushes. The first resident opera company was brought to Australia in 1861 by William Saurin Lyster, and the company toured around Australia and New Zealand. In the 1860s, it performed 42 full-length operas in nearly 1500 performances. The company dispersed after Lyster died in 1880. Australia did not have had another permanent opera company until 1966.

Until then, most opera singers moved abroad to train and find fame. Dame Nellie Melba, a lyric coloratura soprano, was one of the most famous singers of the late 19th century. She travelled to Europe and became a great success in Paris, Brussels and from 1888, in Covent Garden in London. She returned to Australia frequently and raised large sums for Great War charities.

Dame Joan Sutherland was considered the leading coloratura soprano of the 20th century. She began singing leading roles in London in 1952. She sang in Italian, German and English, but was most famous for her lead role in Lucia di Lammermoor, where she became known as La Stupenda.

Other famous Australian opera singers include the sopranos June Bronhill and Yvonne Kenny, and baritones John Shaw, John Cameron, Anthony Warlow and Dennis Olsen.

The assistance of large national funding bodies made Australian opera companies possible. The Elizabethan Trust Opera Company became permanent in 1966, and, as Opera Australia, had its first performance in the Sydney Opera House in 1973. It is not just Australia's principal opera company, but the biggest performing arts company in Australia. Companies such as the West Australian Opera, Opera Queensland, State Opera of South Australia and Victorian Opera are based in individual states. Sydney's Pinchgut Opera performs baroque and early classical works, and Sydney Chamber Opera produces twentieth century and contemporary works.

The Sydney Conservatorium of Music opened an opera school in 1935. Voice is offered as an instrument in other Conservatoria of Music around Australia.

=== Ballet and dance ===
As in opera, early Australian ballet dancers went to England to perform. Sir Robert Helpmann became principal dancer after 1932 for the Vic-Wells Ballet. From the beginning he was also a major director for opera and theatre, an actor with principal roles in plays in major venues, and he appeared in 15 films. He became co-director of the Australian Ballet in 1965, though he frequently clashed with a penny-pinching management. As Australia's greatest theatrical figure of his era, he was given a State Funeral in 1986.The Australian Ballet was founded by the English ballerina Dame Peggy van Praagh in 1962 in Melbourne. It is Australia's foremost classical ballet company and is today recognised as one of the world's major international ballet companies. It performs works from the classical repertoire as well as contemporary works by major Australian and international choreographers. As of 2010, it was presenting approximately 200 performances in cities and regional areas around Australia each year as well as conducting international tours. Regular venues include: the Arts Centre Melbourne, the Sydney Opera House, Sydney Theatre, Adelaide Festival Centre and Queensland Performing Arts Centre.

The Australian Ballet School is the primary training body for the Australian Ballet. It was founded in 1964 and operates out of the Melbourne Arts Precinct.

Most other forms of dance are participatory rather than theatrical performances, with several important exceptions. Indigenous corroboree has commonly been conducted as a presentation or form of theatre, showing the relations of people to Country, to their tribe or to ancestors.

Contemporary dance is also conducted as rehearsed public performance, The Sydney Dance Company was originally a dance-in-education contemporary dance group, which prospered under the leadership of Graeme Murphy from 1976. Murphy is the only choreographer to receive the JC Williamson Award for lifetime achievements in the Arts.

== Theatre today ==
Theatre in Australia today includes a diverse range of performances of different scale and contexts. Performing arts centres across the country like the Sydney Opera House, Arts Centre Melbourne, Queensland Performing Arts Centre, Adelaide Festival Centre produce, present or host Australian and international theatre productions of various kinds. Venues in smaller cities like the Theatre Royal Hobart, The Arts Centre Gold Coast, Darwin Entertainment Centre or Geelong Performing Arts Centre, or outside the CBD of major cities like Frankston Arts Centre, Riverside Theatre Parramatta or Sunnybank Performing Arts Centre, also present seasons of touring productions. Non-traditional spaces Carriageworks in Sydney and Arts House in Melbourne have a focus on contemporary and experimental works. Independent and fringe theatre is fostered by venues such as La Mama and Theatre Works in Melbourne and the Old Fitz in Sydney.

The national Helpmann Awards are the major live performance awards in Australia. Major cities also have their own theatre awards, such as the Sydney Theatre Awards, Melbourne's Green Room Awards and Brisbane's Matilda Awards.

Publishers of Australian playscripts include the non-profit Australian Script Centre, Currency Press, Yackandandah playscripts, Playlab Press and Full Dress Publishing.

== List of current major theatre companies ==
=== Plays and theatre ===
- Back to Back Theatre
- Bell Shakespeare Company
- Black Swan Theatre Company
- Brink Productions
- Belvoir, Sydney
- Griffin Theatre Company
- La Boite Theatre
- La Mama Theatre, Melbourne
- Malthouse Theatre
- Melbourne Theatre Company
- Queensland Theatre
- State Theatre Company of South Australia
- Sydney Theatre Company
- Twelfth Night Theatre
- Windmill Performing Arts

=== Musical theatre ===
- Chamber Made
- Hayes Theatre
- Harvest Rain Theatre Company

=== Circus and physical theatre ===
- Circa, Brisbane
- Circus Oz
- Kage Physical Theatre
- Legs On The Wall
- Gravity and Other Myths

== Performing arts festivals ==
=== Major performing arts festivals ===
- Adelaide Festival of Arts
- Brisbane Festival
- Melbourne Festival
- Perth International Arts Festival
- Sydney Festival
- Ten Days on the Island (Tasmania)

=== Single genre ===
- Adelaide Cabaret Festival
- Melbourne International Comedy Festival

=== Fringe festivals ===
- Adelaide Fringe
- Melbourne Fringe Festival
- Fringe World (Perth)

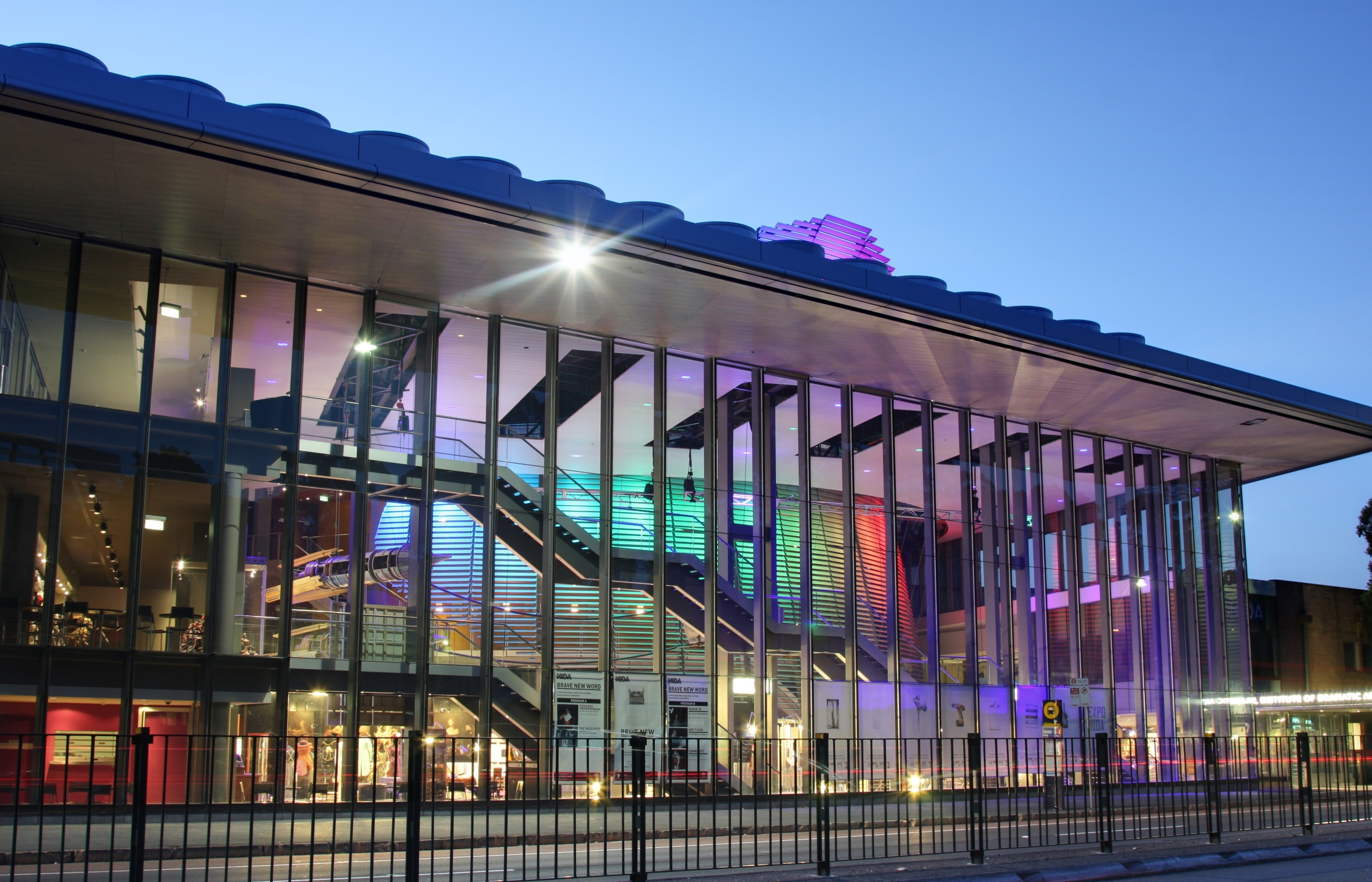
The National Institute of Dramatic Art, Sydney

== Theatre education ==
- Aboriginal Centre for the Performing Arts
- Australian Institute of Music - Dramatic Arts
- National Institute of Dramatic Art (NIDA)
- Western Australian Academy of Performing Arts (WAAPA)
- Victorian College of the Arts (VCA)
- National Institute of Circus Arts (NICA)
- Adelaide College of the Arts
- Australian Institute of Music
- CQUniversity's Central Queensland Conservatorium of Music, Mackay
- Elder Conservatorium of Music and School of Performing Arts

== Awards and competitions ==
- Green Room Awards – for Melbourne theatre, opera and dance
- Helpmann Award – national awards for plays, musicals, opera, dance, comedy, cabaret, contemporary music and classical music
- Mo Awards – national entertainment industry awards live entertainment. Last awarded in 2016
- Matilda Awards – for Brisbane theatre
- Performing Arts WA Awards – for Perth theatre, musicals, opera and dance
- Sydney Theatre Awards – for Sydney theatre

== Performing arts publishers ==
- Australian Script Centre
- Currency Press
- Yackandandah Playscripts

== See also ==
- AusStage – Gateway to Performing Arts
- Performing arts in Australia
- Performing arts education in Australia
- List of concert halls in Australia and New Zealand
- List of festivals in Australia
