= Darren Yap =

Australian actor and director

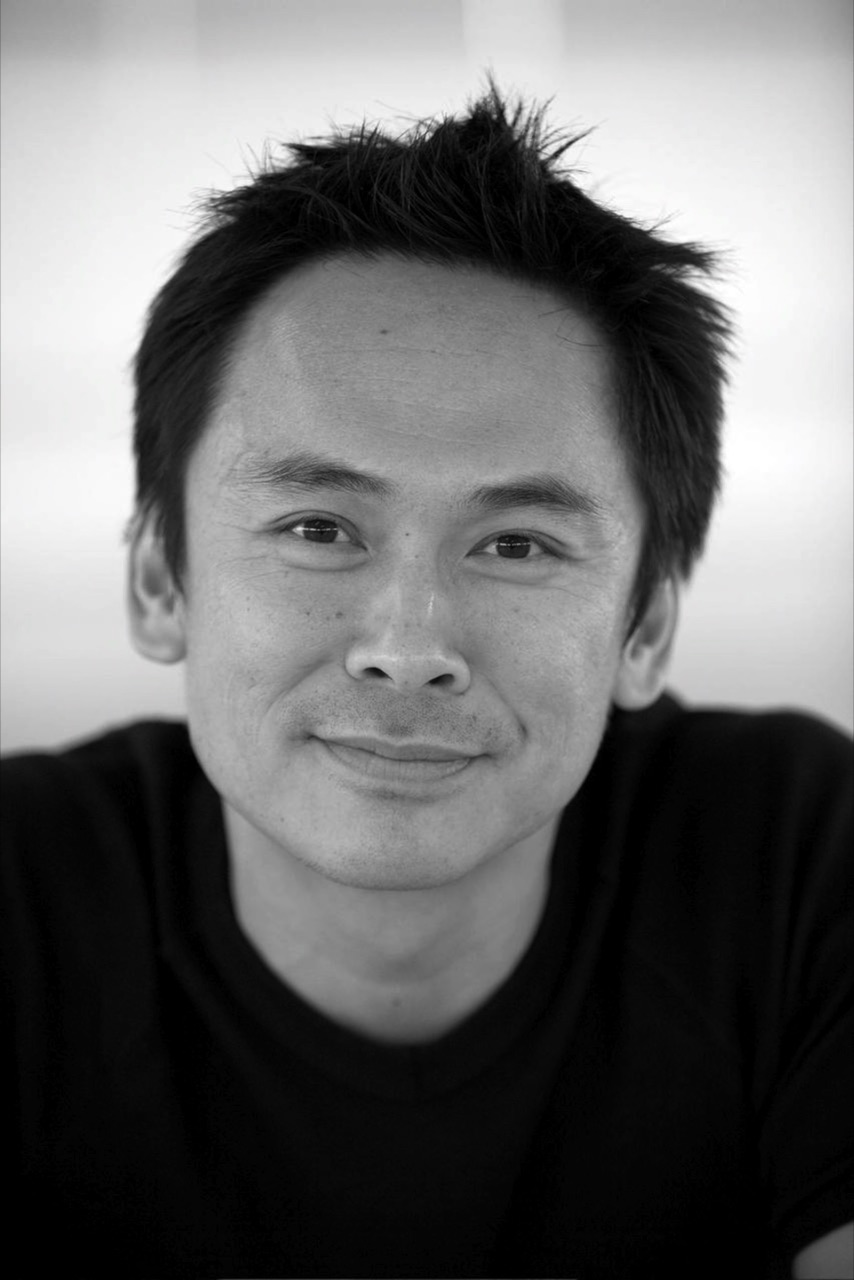
- Born: Darren Robert Yap; 23 August 1967; Sydney, Australia
- Education: Newington College; UWS Theatre Nepean; NIDA
- Years active: 1988 to present
- Spouse: Max Lambert

Darren Yap is an Australian actor and director based in Sydney, Australia.

== Family and education ==
He was born in Sydney and grew up in the South Western Sydney suburb of Cabramatta. He was the third child of a Malaysian-born father and his third-generation Australia-born ethnically Chinese mother. His father, Robert Yap, was a medical practitioner in the western suburbs of Sydney, his brother is a pharmacist in the inner eastern suburbs of Sydney and his sister is a medical practitioner in Victoria.

Yap was educated at Newington College (1980–85).

He initially applied to do the stage management course at the National Institute of Dramatic Art (NIDA) but he was not accepted. When the degree course in acting at University of Western Sydney's Theatre Nepean was first offered he chose to do that. Following UWS, Yap graduated from the director's course at NIDA.

His life partner is the composer Max Lambert.

== Career ==
Yap has a successful career in acting and directing theatre.

== Directing ==
=== Theatre ===
Year	Title	Role	Type
1998	The Boy from Oz	Resident Director	World Premiere
2005	The Admiral's Odyssey	Director	Action Theatre, Singapore – World Premiere
2006	Dick Lee’s Man of Letters	Director	Singapore Repertory Theatre – World Premiere
2006–08	Miss Saigon	Associate Director	Australia, Hong Kong, Singapore, Manchester, Dublin & Edinburgh with Cameron Mackintosh
2009	I Love You, You're Perfect, Now Change	Director	NSW regional tour with Seymour Centre & Kookaburra Musical Theatre & Singapore with Mediacorp VizPro International
2009	Steel Magnolias	Director	Seymour Centre with Blackbird Productions
2009	The 25th Annual Putnam County Spelling Bee	Director	Lasalle College of the Arts, Singapore
2009–10	Mamma Mia	Resident Director / Associate Director	10th Anniversary Australasian tour – Perth, Adelaide, New Zealand, Hong Kong, Singapore, Brisbane & Melbourne
2010	Pinocchio the Musical	Director	Vizpro International & Singapore Repertory Theatre
2010	A Night with the Phantom concert	Director	Brighton, UK
2010–11	Miss Saigon	Associate Director	Korea with Cameron Mackintosh
2011	Thoroughly Modern Millie	Director	Lasalle College of the Arts, Singapore
2011	Miss Saigon	Associate Director	Holland with Cameron Mackintosh
2012	Miss Saigon	Associate Director	Japan with Cameron Mackintosh
2013	King King Live on Stage	Associate Director	World Premiere with Global Creatures
2013	Babies Proms	Director	CDP Theatre Producers
2013–14	A Murder is Announced	Director	Australian national tour with Michael Coppel, Louise Withers & Linda Berwick
2014	Miss Saigon	Associate Director	Tokyo with Cameron Mackintosh
2014	Miracle City	Director	Hayes Theatre with Luckiest Productions
2014	The Serpent's Table	Co-director	Sydney Festival with Griffin Theatre Company & Performance 4a
2015	Lotus Sydney & Playwriting Australia Playreadings	Director	Performance 4a
2015	Little Diana and the Big Fuzz	Director	Hayes Theatre
2016	Ladies Day	Director	Griffin Theatre Company
2017	Diving for Pearls	Director	Griffin Theatre Company
2017	The Great Wall (One Woman's Journey)	Director	Drama Centre, Singapore with Glowsticks Productions – World premiere
2017	Miracle City	Director	Sydney Opera House
2018	Letters to Lindy	Director	Australian national tour with Merrigong Theatre & Canberra Theatre Centre
2018	Spot the Dog	Director	CDP Productions
2018	Ghost, The Musical	Director	Tokyo with Theatre Creation
2018	All Out of Love: The Musical	Director	Newport Performing Arts Theater, Manila
2018; 2020	Jesus Wants Me for a Sunbeam	Director	Riverside Theatres Parramatta, Belvoir Street Theatre & Merrigong
2020	Double Delicious	Director	C.A.A.P, Sydney Festival & Asia Topia 2020
2020	Joseph and the Amazing Technicolor Dreamcoat	Director	Tokyo with C.A.T Productions & Shinjuku Productions
2020–21	Next to Normal	Director	NIDA graduation season
2022	Joseph and the Amazing Technicolor Dreamcoat	Director	Tokyo with C.A.T Productions and Really Useful Group
2022	The Last Five Years	Director	La Boite Theatre, Brisbane
2022	The One	Director	Ensemble Theatre
2022	Yong	Director	Sydney & Victoria with Monkey Baa Theatre
2023	Tim	Director	Glen Street Theatre, Sydney, Newcastle Civic Theatre, Riverside Theatres Parramatta & NSW regional tour with Christine Dunstan Productions
2023	Clyde's	Director	Ensemble Theatre
2024	Zombie! The Musical	Director	Hayes Theatre
	David Williamson’s The Great Man	Affiliate Director	Sydney Theatre Company
	Katherine Thomson’s Navigating	Affiliate Director	Sydney Theatre Company
	Miracle City	Affiliate Director	Western Australian Academy of Performing Arts

=== Events ===
Year	Title	Role	Type
2000	2000 Summer Olympics Closing Ceremony	Associate Director	Homebush Stadium, Sydney
2006	15th Asian Games Closing Ceremony	Segment Director	Doha, Qatar
2006; 2007; 2010	NSW Premier's Gala Concerts	Director	Sydney Entertainment Centre with Venables Entertainment
2008; 2009	Chinese New Year Parade	Director	City of Sydney
2011	SpongeBob SquarePants Parade	Director	Sea World for Gold Coast for Nickelodeon
2015	Opening of the National Gallery & Art Carnival, SG50 Celebrations	Artistic Festival Consultant & Art Carnival Director	Singapore
2016	NSW Premier's Gala Concerts	Director	Allphones Arena, Sydney with Venables Entertainment
2016	Cairo MISR Pre-Show Celabrations	Associate Director	Cairo with World Events
2019	Abu Dhabi 48th National Day Celebrations	Associate Director	Abu Dhabi with Betty Productions
	Red Sea International Film Festival	Director	Jeddah, Saudi Arabia
2020	World Expo Dubai 2020	Staging Director	Al Wasal Plaza, Dubai with Artists in Motion

== Acting ==
=== Theatre ===
Year	Title	Role	Type
1989	Anything Goes	John	Hayden Attractions
1990	Shadow and Splendour	Mori / Local Policeman / Mozart Singer	Queensland Theatre
1990	Capricornia	Cho Sek Ching	STCSA
1991	Chess	Ensemble	Victoria State Opera
1992	Cockroach Opera	Roima	Belvoir Street Theatre with Company B
1993	M. Butterfly	Song Liling	Melbourne Theatre Company
1994	The Wedding Song		NIDA
1995	Miss Saigon	Thuy	Capitol Theatre, Sydney for Cameron Mackintosh
1995	The Quartet from Rigoletto		Ensemble Theatre
1995	Sydney Stories	Various characters	Sydney Theatre Company
2003	Songket	Koua Neng Vang	Griffin Theatre Company
2006	Constance Drinkwater and the Final Days of Somerset	Hop Lee	Bille Brown Theatre with Queensland Theatre
2019	Aladdin		Disney Theatrical Productions

=== Television ===
Year	Title	Role	Type
1988	Mission: Impossible	Quon	TV series, season 2, episode 5: "Countdown"
1988	Richmond Hill		TV series
1989–92	Tanamera - Lion of Singapore	Paul	Miniseries, 7 episodes
1991	Embassy	Hung	TV series, season 2, episode 3: "The East Wind Blows West"
1992	Bony	Chang	TV series, season 1, episode 1: "Bird in the Hand"
1993	G.P.	Jimmy Lee	TV series, 2 episodes
1993	The Leaving of Liverpool	Dave	Miniseries
1992	Children of the Dragon		Miniseries
1994	Heartland	Dr Nguyen	TV series, 2 episodes
1994	Over the Hill	Kevin	TV series,
1998	A Difficult Woman	Dr Wei	Miniseries, 3 episodes

=== Film ===
Year	Title	Role	Type
1996	Floating Life	Lone	Feature film
2007	The Home Song Stories	Adult Tom	Feature film

== Awards and nominations ==
Year	Nominated work	Award	Category	Result
1999	The Boy from Oz (world premiere)	Green Room Awards	Best Re-Staging by a Resident Artist	Won
	Diving for Pearls	BroadwayWorld Regional Award	Best Director of a Play	Won
	Miracle City	Glugs Theatrical Awards	Outstanding Mainstage Musical	Nominated
	Diving for Pearls	Glugs Theatrical Awards	Outstanding Mainstage Production	Nominated
2022	Monkey Baa Theatre Company's Yong	Sydney Theatre Awards		Won
2024	Zombie! The Musical	Sydney Theatre Awards	Best Direction in a Musical	Won
