= Terence Clarke (composer) =

Australian composer and theatre director

Terence Osborne Clarke (AM) (born 1935) is a retired Australian theatrical director and composer who also worked as an actor, pianist, musical director, teacher and dramaturg. On Australian Day 2007 he was installed as a Member of the Order of Australia for service to the performing arts as a director, actor, writer, composer and educator.

== Early life ==
Clarke was born in 1935 in Sydney and educated at Shore and the University of Sydney (resident St Paul's College), graduating BA with first-class honours in Music. While a student he appeared as Robert in the Sydney University Players' rendition of Peter Ustinov's play The Indifferent Shepherd in August 1953. A reviewer for the Sydney Morning Herald observed, "[he] had little to say but said it nicely". One of his fellow students at university was Charles Colman. After graduation Clarke taught at All Saints College, Bathurst (where he had attended primary school) and at Cranbrook School, Sydney, where he became head of mathematics and in charge of drama.

== Career ==
Terence Clarke's career has alternated between theatre work and teaching. While in England during 1959-1960 he acted at the Marlowe Theatre, Canterbury. In 1970 he left teaching to return to theatre and music. During his theatre career he has worked as an actor, artistic director, composer, musical director, writer and pianist from 1963 to 2016. Early work was as actor and musical director at Nimrod Street Theatre, Darlinghurst. His appointments have included: Associate Director of Perth's National Theatre at the Playhouse where he also acted, composed and played piano; founding Artistic Director of the Hunter Valley Theatre Company, Australia's first professional regional theatre company; Artistic Director of the Australian National Playwrights Conference; and Head of Directing at the National Institute of Dramatic Art, where he continued to teach. He directed the world premieres of A Happy and Holy Occasion (John O'Donoghue) and Backyard (Janis Balodis). He has taught at the West Australian Institute of Technology, the University of Newcastle, and the University of New South Wales, where he held a demi-lectureship for a year.

Clarke wrote three musicals to book and lyrics by Nick Enright: The Venetian Twins (cast album, Folkways Records), produced by all state theatre companies, and toured; Variations (Winner of the Play Award, New South Wales Premier's Literary Awards, 1983) not seen since its original Nimrod Theatre production runs in 1982 and 1983; and Summer Rain, commissioned by NIDA for the graduating class of 1984 and directed by Gale Edwards, later revised three times for productions at the Sydney and Queensland Theatre Companies.

His other compositions include: a ballad opera, Flash Jim Vaux (book and lyrics, Ron Blair). Leonard Glickfeld of The Australian Jewish News reviewed its performance at Russell Street Theatre, Melbourne in December 1973. Glickfeld praised Blair's writing including the ballads' lyrics, which were set to music by Clarke and Colman. However the lyrics "are not always matched by the quality or rhythms of the music... about four tunes which really work." Blair later dropped 'Vaux' from the play's title. Clarke also provided five plays with music - Catspaw and Jarrabin (both Dorothy Hewett), Lysistrata (John Croyston), Henry and Peter and Henry and Me (George Hutchinson), and Gone with Hardy (David Allen); incidental music; and song-settings. Late in 1992 he returned to Canberra to direct the Canberra Theatre's version of The Pirates of Penzance (or The Slave of Duty), which ran from 15 to 30 January 1993. He worked with set and costume designer Tim Kobin to eschew the traditional pantomime renditions and depict the titular pirates as "predators, feral, and at the same time like boys who get dirty, tattooed."

== Honours ==
On Australia Day (26 January) 2007 Clarke was appointed as a Member of the Order of Australia "for service to the performing arts as a director, actor, writer, composer, and educator." He was presented a Lifetime Achievement Award at the 2023 Sydney Theatre Awards.

== Theatre roles ==
Year	Title	Role	Notes	Ref(s)
1963	An Ideal Husband	actor	Pocket Playhouse, Sydenham, NSW	
1964	The Man of Mode	actor (Dorimant)	Union Theatre, Sydney, NSW	
1971–73; 1978; 1982	Flash Jim Vaux; Flash Jim	actor, composer musical director, pianist	Nimrod Street Theatre, Darlinghurst, NSW; Twelfth Night Theatre, Bowen Hills, Qld; Claremont Theatre Centre, South Yarra, Vic; Nimrod Street Theatre, Darlinghurst, NSW; Playhouse Theatre, Perth, WA; Theatre 3, Acton, ACT; Russell Street Theatre, Melbourne, Vic; Q Theatre, Penrith, NSW; Bankstown Town Hall, Bankstown, NSW; Marsden Theatre, Parramatta, NSW; Nimrod Upstairs, Surry Hills, NSW	
1971	Duke of Edinburgh Assassinated or The Vindication of Henry Parkes	composer	Nimrod Street Theatre, Darlinghurst, NSW	
1972	The Legend of King O'Malley	musical director, pianist	Civic Theatre Auditorium, Suva, Fiji; Mercury Theatre, Auckland, New Zealand; Downstage Theatre, Wellington, New Zealand; Hunter Theatre, The Junction, NSW	
1973	The Dumb Waiter	director	Perth, WA	
1973	The Proposal	director	Perth, WA	
1973; 1977	Hamlet	actor designer, set designer	Nimrod Street Theatre, Darlinghurst, NSW; The Playhouse, Civic Square, ACT; Hunter Theatre, Broadmeadow, NSW	
1973	The After-Life of Arthur Cravan	actor	Jane Street Theatre, Randwick, NSW	
1973	Lysistrata	composer	Parade Theatre, Kensington, NSW	
1973	The Chocolate Frog	actor	Playhouse Theatre, Perth, WA	
1973	The Typists	director	Playhouse Theatre, Perth, WA	
1973	The House of Blue Leaves	actor	Playhouse Theatre, Perth, WA	
1973–74	Jugglers Three	director	Playhouse Theatre, Perth, WA	
1974	A Who's Who of Flapland	director	Playhouse Theatre, Perth, WA	
1974	Antony and Cleopatra	composer, musical director	New Fortune Theatre, Crawley, WA	
1974	Catspaw	composer, musical director	New Fortune Theatre, Crawley, WA	
1974	The Prisoner of Second Avenue	director	Playhouse Theatre, Perth, WA	
1974	Uncle Vanya	actor	Playhouse Theatre, Perth, WA	
1974	Absurd Person Singular	director	Playhouse Theatre, Perth, WA; Theatre 62, Hilton, SA	
1974	Home	director	The Green Room, Perth, WA	
1974	See How They Run	actor	Playhouse Theatre, Perth, WA	
1975	Knuckle	director	The Green Room, Perth, WA	
1975	Edgar Metcalfe Suggests	actor	The Hole in the Wall Theatre, Leederville, WA	
1975	Time and Time Again	director	Playhouse Theatre, Perth, WA	
1975	A Hard God	director	The Hole in the Wall Theatre, Leederville, WA	
1975	Hello Dolly!	director	Playhouse Theatre, Perth, WA	
1975	Whitlam Days	director	The Green Room, Perth, WA	
1975	What If You Died Tomorrow?	director	Playhouse Theatre, Perth, WA	
1976	The Floating World	director	University of Newcastle Drama Theatre, Callaghan, NSW	
1976	Hamlet on Ice	director, musical director, pianist	University of Newcastle Drama Theatre, Callaghan, NSW	
1976	The Glass Menagerie	director	University of Newcastle Drama Theatre, Callaghan, NSW	
1976	Equus	designer, director	The Griffith Duncan Theatre, Callaghan, NSW	
1976	A Married Man	designer, director	Newcastle, NSW	
1976	Four on the Floor	actor, devisor	Hotel Hunter, Newcastle, NSW	
1977	What the Butler Saw	director	Hunter Theatre, The Junction, NSW	
1977	The Rip-Roaring Twenties Show	playwright	University of New England Union Bistro, Armidale, NSW; Tilly's Tavern, Newcastle, NSW	
1978	Gone with Hardy	director	Canberra, ACT	
1978	Sleuth	director	SGIO Theatre, Brisbane, Qld	
1979	Treasure Island	actor (Squire Trelawney)	Clark Island, Sydney, NSW	
1979	Romeo and Juliet	director	Canberra Theatre, Canberra, ACT	
1979	Flexitime	director	Newcastle, NSW	
1979; 1981-82; 1990–91; 1993; 1996–97; 2000; 2004–05	The Venetian Twins	composer, fight director, musical director, pianist	Drama Theatre (Sydney Opera House), Sydney, NSW; York Theatre, Chippendale, NSW; Canberra Theatre, Canberra, ACT; Festival Theatre, Adelaide, SA; Her Majesty's Theatre, Melbourne, Vic; Geelong, Vic; La Boite Theatre, Milton, Qld; Playhouse, Newcastle, NSW; Suncorp Theatre, Brisbane, Qld; Footbridge Theatre, University of Sydney, NSW; Playhouse, Melbourne, Vic; Peacock Theatre, Hobart, Tas; Newcastle Civic Theatre, Newcastle, NSW; The Playhouse, Adelaide, SA; Playhouse, Melbourne, Vic; Playhouse, South Bank, Qld; Pavilion Theatre, Castle Hill, NSW; Wesley Institute Theatre, Drummoyne, NSW	
1980	The Sunny South	musical arranger	Drama Theatre (Sydney Opera House), Sydney, NSW	
1980	Backyard	director	Nimrod Downstairs, Surry Hills, NSW	
1981	Pal Joey	director	The Playhouse Theatre, Perth, WA	
1981	You Never Can Tell	director	Marian Street Theatre, Sydney, NSW	
1981	One Flew Over the Cuckoo's Nest	director	NIDA Theatre, Kensington, NSW	
1982	Annie	director	Canberra Theatre, Canberra, ACT	
1982	Jonah	director	Parade Theatre, Kensington, NSW	
1982	Night and Day	director	Marian Street Theatre, Sydney, NSW; Canberra Theatre, Canberra, ACT	
1982	A Happy and Holy Occasion	director	Drama Theatre (Sydney Opera House), Sydney, NSW	
1982–83	Variations	composer	Nimrod Upstairs, Surry Hills, NSW; Seymour Centre, Chippendale, NSW	
1983	Madame Butterfly	director	Opera Theatre, Adelaide, SA	
1983; 1989; 1991; 1997; 2001; 2004–05; 2007; 2016	Summer Rain	composer, musical director	Parade Theatre, Kensington, NSW; Drama Theatre (Sydney Opera House), Sydney, NSW; Inverell Town Hall, Inverell, NSW; Western Australian Academy of Performing Arts, Mount Lawley, WA; Suncorp Theatre, Brisbane, QLD; Spotlight Theatre, Benowa, QLD; Mittagong Playhouse, Mittagong, NSW; Performance Space, Wollongong, NSW; Sydney Theatre, Millers Point, NSW; Wagga Wagga Civic Theatre, Wagga Wagga, NSW; New Theatre, Newtown, NSW	
1984	The Servant of Two Masters	translator	Nimrod, Surry Hills, NSW	
1986	The Foreigner	director	Footbridge Theatre, Glebe, NSW; Regal Theatre, Subiaco, WA; Opera Theatre, Adelaide, SA; Noarlunga College Theatre, Noarlunga, SA	
1988	The Touch of Silk	director	Playhouse, Melbourne, VIC	
1989	Too Young for Ghosts	director	Parade Theatre, Kensington, NSW	
1990	Woman in Mind	director	Playhouse, Melbourne, VIC	
1990	The Man from Mukinupin	director	Parade Theatre, Kensington, NSW	
1991	Pest House	director	Parade Theatre, Kensington, NSW	
1993	The Pirates of Penzance (or The Slave of Duty)	director	Canberra Theatre, Canberra, ACT	
1994	Anything Goes	director	Canberra Theatre, Canberra, ACT	
1994	Oscar Wilde at the Cafe Royal	director	Mietta's, Melbourne, VIC	
1995	The School for Scandal	director	Suncorp Theatre, Brisbane, Qld	
2000	Playboy of the Western World	director	The Playhouse, Kingswood, NSW	
2000	Studio Nights	composer	The Studio, (Sydney Opera House), Sydney, NSW	
2001	Plenty and The Sea	director	NIDA Theatre, Kensington, NSW	
2003	The Accrington Pals	director	Parade Theatre, Kensington, NSW	
2003	The Comedy of Errors	director	Seymour Downstairs, Chippendale, NSW	
