= Nick Enright =

Australian dramatist, playwright and theatre director

- Enright c. 1976
- Born: Nicholas Paul Enright; 22 December 1950; Maitland, Australia
- Died: 30 March 2003 (aged 52); Sydney, Australia
- Education: University of Sydney (BA); New York University (MFA)
- Occupations: Playwright; lyricist; teacher; actor; director

Nicholas Paul Enright AM (22 December 1950 – 30 March 2003) was an Australian dramatist, playwright and theatre director.

== Early life ==
Enright was born on 22 December 1950 to a prosperous professional Catholic family in East Maitland, New South Wales. He was drama captain of St Ignatius' College, Riverview in Sydney in 1964, where, like Gerard Windsor and Justin Fleming, he was taught by Melvyn Morrow. At that school, he won the 1sts Debating Premiership in both 1966 and 1967.

During 1971 and 1972 Enright was a member of Sydney's Genesian Theatre, performing in A Doll's House and Uncle Vanya, and directing London Assurance.

Enright earned a BA from Sydney University in 1972.

== Career ==
He worked as a gofer for Sydney's Nimrod Theatre before being appointed a trainee director at the Melbourne Theatre Company. He won an Australia Council Fellowship to study directing at New York University, graduating in 1977. On his return to Australia, he joined the State Theatre Company of South Australia as actor and director, later becoming associate director. He was Head of Acting at the NIDA in 1983 and 1984.

He was encouraged to write plays while at NYU by one of his teachers, the playwright Israel Horovitz. His many plays include: Good Works, Blackrock, Daylight Saving, Mongrels (about the relation between Australian playwrights Jim McNeil and Peter Kenna, the latter a friend), The Female Factory, A Man with Five Children, On the Wallaby, and A Poor Student, many of them published by Currency Press. His plays – which include French and Italian translations and adaptations – have been performed by all major Australian theatre companies, including Sydney Theatre Company, Company B, the Australian Opera (as it then was), Melbourne Theatre Company, Queensland Theatre Company, State Theatre Company of South Australia, the Ensemble Theatre, Playbox, La Boite Theatre, and the Australian Theatre for Young People. His one-act theatre-in-education play A Property of the Clan was developed into the full-length play, and later film, Blackrock (1997).

Enright also wrote a number of screenplays; he was nominated for an Academy Award (along with director/co-writer George Miller) for his screenplay of Lorenzo's Oil (1992).

He wrote the book and lyrics to a number of musical works: three musicals with Terence Clarke – The Venetian Twins; Variations (Winner, NSW Premier's Literary Play Award, 1983); and Summer Rain (commissioned for a graduating class at NIDA) -, and others with Alan John (Orlando Rourke), David King (The Betrothed, The Voyage of Mary Bryant, The Good Fight), and Max Lambert (Miracle City); and an opera with Graham Dudley (The Snow Queen).

Enright wrote the book of the stage musical version of The Boy from Oz, based on the biography of the same name written by Stephen MacLean, which was produced by Ben Gannon with great success around Australia, and, after his death, in New York.

His adaptation, with Justin Monjo, of Tim Winton's Cloudstreet enjoyed huge critical and box-office success at the Sydney and Perth Festivals (whose co-production it was), on tour of Australia, at the Festival of Dublin, and in London. He wrote for ABC Radio, including Watching over Israel (1990 AWGIE winner, Best Radio Play). His non-dramatic work includes a book for children, The Maitland and Morpeth String Quartet (illustrated by Victoria Roberts), a set of verses for The Carnival of the Animals, and occasional verse. He edited Holding the Man, a memoir by his former NIDA student, Timothy Conigrave, and, following Conigrave's death, saw it to publication by Penguin Books.

== Personal life ==
Although he was openly gay, he never found his longed-for committed relationship.

After 15 years in remission, melanoma recurred; he died of cancer on 30 March 2003, at age 52. Three years after his death, Happy Feet was dedicated to his memory.

== Awards ==
Nominated for an Academy Award for Best Original Screenplay for Lorenzo's Oil (1992), co-written with its director George Miller.

Received the Major AWGIE Award from the Australian Writers Guild four times: for the play Daylight Saving (1990); the play A Property of the Clan (1993); the screenplay Blackrock (1997); and the stage adaptation of Cloudstreet (1999, with Justin Monjo).

Received the inaugural Play Award at the New South Wales Premier's Literary Awards in 1983 with composer Terence Clarke for the musical Variations. This award is now named the Nick Enright Prize for Playwriting.

Won a Helpmann Award for Best New Australian Work in 2001 for the musical The Boy from Oz, and was nominated in the same category the following year for A Man with Five Children.

Many other awards include those from the Sidney Myer Performing Arts Awards (1998 Individual Winner) and the Green Room Awards.

Enright had been appointed an adjunct professor in the School of Drama at the Western Australian Academy of Performing Arts; after his death, one of his former WAAPA students, Eddie Perfect, wrote an elegiac song about him ('Someone Like That').

== Honours ==
In June 2004 his appointment as a Member of the Order of Australia was posthumously announced, although it was deemed effective from 14 November 2002. The citation read: 'For service to the performing arts, particularly as a playwright, teacher, actor, director, and as a mentor of emerging talent'.

== Select credits ==
=== Plays ===
- The Mavis McMahon Show (1972) – contributing writer
- The Good Ship Venus (1980) – one act
- On the Wallaby (1980)
- First Class Women (1982)
- The Maitland and Morpeth String Quartet (1985) – based on his radio play
- Daylight Saving (1989)
- St James Infirmary Blues (1992)
- A Property of the Clan (1992)
- Bobbin' Up (1993)
- Good Works (1994)
- Blackrock (1995)
- Playgrounds (1996)
- Mongrels (1997)
- Chasing the Dragon (1998)
- Cloudstreet (1998)
- Spurboard (1999)
- A Poor Student (2001)
- Country Music (2002)
- The Female Factory
- A Man with Five Children
- The Quartet from Rigoletto

=== Musicals ===
- The Venetian Twins (1979)
- On the Wallaby (1980)
- Buckley's! (1981)
- Fatal Johnny (1982)
- Variations (1982)
- Summer Rain (1983)
- Orlando Rourke (1985)
- The Betrothed (1993)
- The Voyage of Mary Bryant (1996)
- Miracle City (1996)
- The Boy from Oz (1998)
- The Good Fight (2001)
- The Snow Queen (opera)

=== Adaptations ===
- Sophocles' Electra (1978) (with Frank Hauser)
- Goldoni's The Servant of Two Masters (1978) (with Ron Blair)
- Oh What a Lovely War, Mate (1979)
- Gozzi's King Stag (1980)
- Beaumarchais' The Marriage of Figaro (1983)
- Molière's Don Juan (1984)
- Hans Andersen's The Snow Queen (1985)
- Euripides' The Trojan Women (1989)
- Offenbach operetta La Périchole (1993)

=== Screenplays ===
- Breaking Through (1990)
- Come In Spinner (1990)
- Lorenzo's Oil (1992)
- Naked – "Coral Island" (1996) (TV episode)
- Blackrock (1997)

=== TV movies ===
- Breaking Up (1985)

=== Radio ===
- The Maitland and Morpeth String Quartet (1979)
- Ship Without a Sail – The Songs of Lorenz Hart (1985)
- Watching over Israel (1990)

=== Theatre director ===
- Uncle Vanya (1972) (assistant)
- London Assurance (1972)
- Juggler's Three (1973)
- Mick Wants to Go (1978)
- Royal (1978)
- Arms and the Man (1978)
- Roses in Due Season (1978)
- American Buffalo (1979)
- Twelfth Night (1979)
- The Matchmaker (1979)
- King Stag (1980)
- Traitors (1980)
- A Month in the Country (1980)
- As You Like It (1981)
- A Hard God (1981)
- The Money or the Box? (1983)
- Holiday Makers (1984)
- The Comedy of Errors (1984)
- The Real Thing (1985)

== See also ==
- List of playwrights
