= Catspaw (rock opera) =

Play written by Dorothy Hewett

- Original language: English
- Written by: Dorothy Hewett
- Genre: Rock musical

Premiere
- Date: 12 February 1974
- Place: Perth, WA
- Directed by: Aarne Neeme

Catspaw is a 1974 rock musical by Australian playwright Dorothy Hewett, with music by Terence Clarke, Piers Partridge and Roy Ritchie. It was Hewett's fifth full-length play and her first rock musical. It was written for the Festival of Perth before Hewett departed permanently for Sydney in early 1974. Catspaw is an expressionist or "epic" play with an episodic plot loosely based on a quest. It is the first of Hewett's plays that deals with the conservation of Australia, both as landscape and cultural heritage, where "imagination" is a universal cultural force opposed to the destruction caused by commercial interests.

The Prologue and Epilogue are set in a car wreckers yard, where Cat has sought refuge with his girlfriend Rabbit and her young daughter Kitten. They set off on his motorbike on a hippie expedition to the desert to find out the 'fantastic possibilities" of life. In Act I the bike breaks down in Opal, an isolated gem town. Cat is bitten by the opal bug, but leaves town when he shoots a mystic Chinese prospector figure. Rabbit dies in childbirth. In Act II a flying saucer lands and disgorges a cargo of old Australian show-biz characters, who are "Greenies", come to save the country. They set off on a great protest march to the Bight, but instead end up back at the car wrecker's yard, as Cat's revolution comes to nothing. However Cat makes a personal journey from arrogance to the beginnings of humility, particularly in his relations with women,

The play ran at the New Fortune Theatre from 12 February to 23 February 1974. and was directed by Aarne Neeme, who had directed Hewett's 1971 play The Chapel Perilous. A student production was conducted at the University of New South Wales in 1984, with a modified ending involving characters from the 1980s.

The script is held in the Hangar Collection of unpublished playscripts. A rehearsal recording is in the University of New England Stage and Screen collection.

== Review ==
Zoltan Kovacs, The West Australian 14 February 1974.
