= Variations (musical) =

1982 musical by Nick Enright and Terence Clarke

- Chamber Music For Nine Players and Six Instruments
- Music: Terence Clarke
- Lyrics: Nick Enright
- Book: Nick Enright
- Productions: 1982 Sydney

Variations is a musical with book and lyrics by Nick Enright and music and arrangements by Terence Clarke.

It premiered at the Belvoir St Theatre in Sydney on 2 December 1982, produced by the Nimrod Theatre Company. The original production was directed by John Bell and featured Nancye Hayes, Deidre Rubenstein, Robert Alexander, Philip Dodd, Vivienne Garrett, Brian James, Patricia Kennedy, Kim Krejus and George Spartels.

Set in contemporary (1982) Sydney, the musical concerned the search for love and fulfilment in three generations of Australian women: a cello-playing grandmother seeking a violinist to play with her; her daughter, a shopfront lawyer and single mother; a daughter-in-law leaving a routine marriage; and a granddaughter approaching love for the first time.

Variations received the Play Award at the 1983 New South Wales Premier's Literary Awards. Despite the award, since the première there has been no further staged production. Neglected Musicals performed a staged reading in 2013 at the Hayes Theatre in Sydney.
