= Max Lambert =

Australian composer and musical director (born 1955)

Max Lambert AM
- Born: 1955 (age 70–71); Sydney
- Origin: Sydney Conservatorium of Music
- Occupations: Composer, musical director

Max Lambert AM (born 1955) is an Australian composer and musical director.

== Early life ==
Born in 1955 in Sydney, he studied at the Sydney Conservatorium of Music.

== Career ==
=== Stage ===
Lambert has worked for Sydney Theatre Company, Melbourne Theatre Company, Queensland Theatre, Griffin Theatre Company, Bell Shakespeare, Sydney Dance Company and The Australian Ballet.

He was the musical director for the original production of The Boy from Oz, for which he received a Helpmann Award for Best Musical Direction in 2001. He was musical supervisor on Hairspray, Fame, King Kong Live and Strictly Ballroom – the Musical.

Lambert composed the stage musicals Berlin (1995) together with Iva Davies for the Sydney Dance Company, Miracle City (2014) for Sydney Theatre Company, and Darlinghurst Nights (2018). He has also composed music for Ladies Day, Letters to Lindy, The Literati, Diving for Pearls and Hot Shoe Shuffle (the latter of which, he co-wrote).

=== Film ===
He has worked on the feature films Happy Feet and The Last Days of Chez Nous.

=== Events ===
Lambert was the musical director for the Opening and Closing Ceremonies of the Sydney 2000 Olympic Games, the 2002 Commonwealth Games in Manchester and the 2006 Asian Games. He was also the Music Supervisor for Expo Dubai UAE 2020.

=== Recording artists ===
Lambert has recorded with a variety of notable Australian singers, including Kate Ceberano, Wendy Matthews, Grace Knight, Vince Jones, Renée Geyer, Paul Kelly, Iva Davies and Icehouse.

== Honours ==
Lambert was made a Member of the Order of Australia in the 2024 Australia Day Honours list "for significant service to music and to the performing arts".

== Personal life ==
Lambert's life partner is the actor and director Darren Yap.
