= James Hardy Vaux =

English-born author known for early 19th century publications in Australia

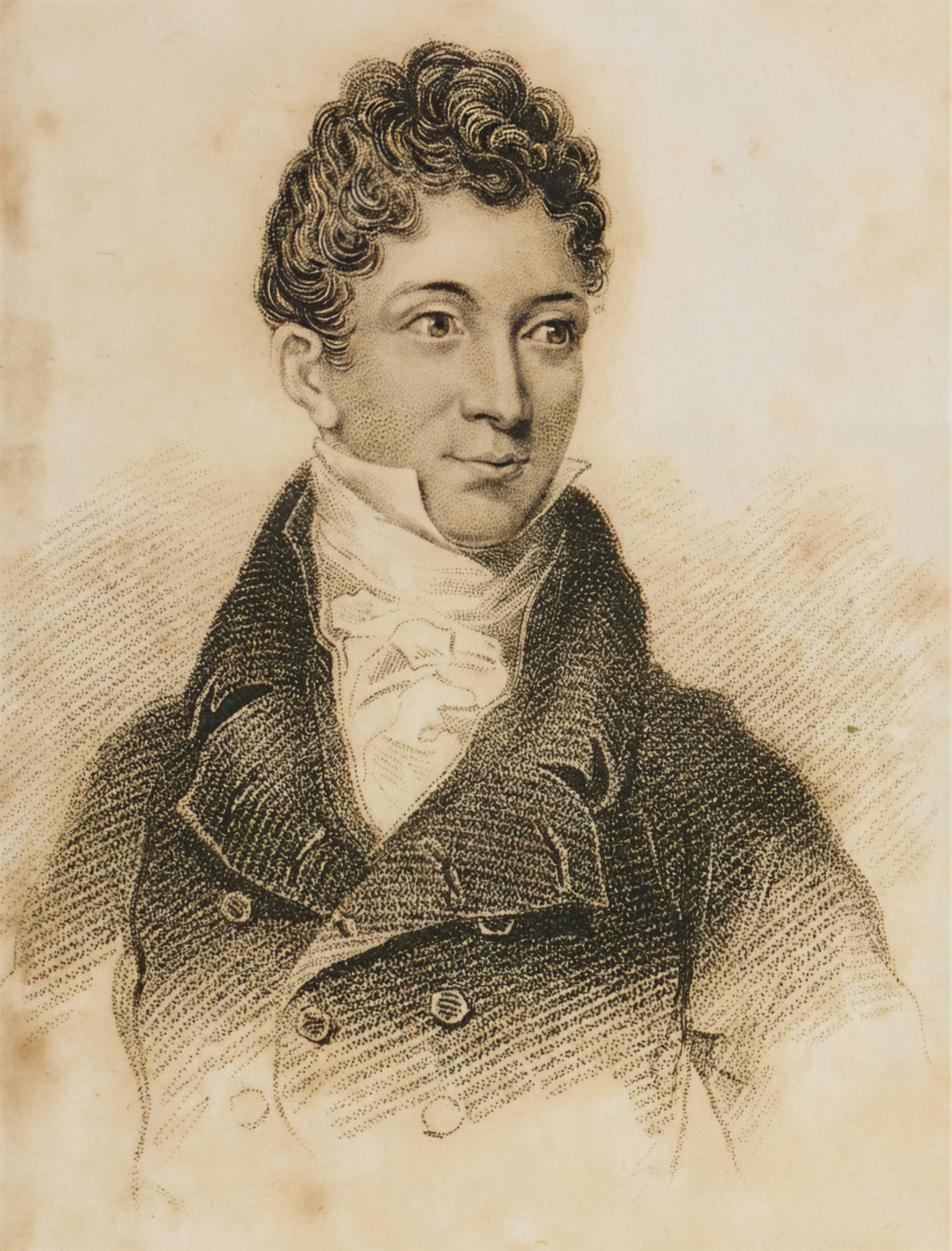
- Portrait of James Hardy Vaux, c. 1819
- Born: c. 1782; Surrey, England
- Other names: James Lowe, James Young
- Convictions: Pickpocketting, theft, passing forged banknotes, indecent assault
- Penalty: Transportation to Australia

James Hardy Vaux (c. 1782 - after 1841) was an English-born convict transported to Australia on three occasions. He was the author of Memoirs of James Hardy Vaux including A Vocabulary of the Flash Language, first published in 1819, which is regarded as both the first full length autobiography and first dictionary written in Australia.

== Early life ==
Born in Surrey, England, James Hardy Vaux was the son of Hardy Vaux, butler and house steward to George Holme Sumner of Hatchlands Park, and his wife Sophia, the daughter of an attorney. Vaux spent much of his childhood living with his maternal grandparents in Shropshire, England.

At age 14, Vaux was apprenticed to a linen draper in Liverpool. He was initially well behaved, but soon developed rakish habits, staying out late at night and disappearing to cock fights during the day. He began pilfering small amounts of money from the till of his employer to pay his gambling debts and maintain his lifestyle. Even though the thefts went undiscovered, Vaux's employer did not approve of his habits and dismissed him after only a few months' service.

Vaux next found employment as a clerk in London, although he was far more interested in frequenting the red-light district of Covent Garden and seedy alehouses than his work. Always restless, he changed jobs several times, including a stint in the Navy in 1798–99 on board HMS Astraea until he deserted and returned to London.

== Criminal career ==
=== First transportation ===
By 1800 Vaux was a professional thief and swindler. He started out by ordering clothes and other goods from tradesmen on credit, never intending to pay for them, and then moving out of his lodgings late at night to avoid paying his debts and rent. He progressed to duping people into donating money to him and betrayed the trust of his employers by stealing from them. He was arrested in April 1800 after defrauding an employer, although he avoided conviction.

Vaux was again arrested in August 1800, this time for pickpocketing a handkerchief in company with Alexander Bromley, a thief he met in Newgate Prison. They were both tried at the Old Bailey, found guilty and sentenced to seven years' transportation.

Transported to Australia, Vaux arrived in Sydney in the convict ship Minorca in December 1801. He worked as a clerk to a storekeeper at Hawkesbury and then at the Colonial Secretary's Office in Sydney. Vaux again betrayed the trust placed in him by forging the initials of Governor King on commissariat orders for which he was punished with hard labour in a convict road-gang. He gradually redeemed himself and in 1806 was appointed clerk to the magistrates at Parramatta.

In 1807 Governor King, then returning to England, gave Vaux a passage home on the ship HMS Buffalo in exchange for him arranging the Governor's papers during the voyage. Vaux's sentence expired during the voyage and, although compelled to enlist as a seaman, he deserted the ship on its arrival in England.

=== Second transportation ===
Back in London, Vaux soon resumed his dishonest activities. Assuming the appearance of a gentleman, he stole chains, brooches and rings from jewellers' shops as well as the pocket books and snuffboxes of fellow theatre patrons. His activities continued undetected for some time until in November 1808 he was arrested and narrowly escaped conviction at his trial the following month for the theft of a silver snuffbox.

His luck ran out in February 1809 when, under the alias James Lowe, he was convicted at the Old Bailey of the felony of stealing three diamond rings and a brooch from a jeweller's shop in Piccadilly. As this was a capital offence, he was sentenced to death although this was subsequently commuted to transportation for life.

After months imprisoned in miserable conditions on the convict hulk Retribution, Vaux was transported on the convict ship Indian and reached Sydney for the second time in December 1810. He was assigned to a Hawkesbury settler and then later appointed overseer of a convict gang in Sydney. However, in 1811 he was banished to the Newcastle penal settlement for receiving stolen property and in 1814 he was caught attempting to escape the colony by ship for which he was flogged and returned to Newcastle.

Vaux received a conditional pardon in 1820 which excused him from serving out his sentence on condition that he remained in the colony. For the next six years he was employed as a clerk in the Colonial Secretary's Office until suddenly dismissed in 1826. His dismissal followed from concerns that his convict past meant it was discreditable to the office to retain him, even though there were no suggestion he had acted improperly. Vaux complained bitterly that his dismissal was unjust. He found work elsewhere but not with the same status or level of responsibility. After staying out of trouble for many years, in April 1829 Vaux absconded from the colony, breaching the terms of his conditional pardon.

=== Third transportation ===
Fleeing to Ireland, Vaux was soon in trouble again. In August 1830 he was convicted at Dublin, under the alias James Young, for using forged banknotes. He pleaded guilty and, was sentenced to transportation for seven years. While this offence usually attracted a more severe penalty, Vaux had written to the bank whose notes were forged and obtained their support for leniency.

He was transported for the third time on the convict ship Waterloo. On reaching Sydney in May 1831, he was recognised as an escaped convict, and his previous life sentence reinstated. He was sent to Port Macquarie penal settlement where he remained for the next six years.

Vaux returned to Sydney in 1837 where he worked as clerk to a wine merchant. In May 1839 he was convicted of indecently assaulting an eight-year-old girl and sentenced to two years imprisonment. He was released from prison in 1841, then age 59. Nothing is known about the remainder of his life after 1841 or his death.

== Literary works ==
Whilst banished to the Newcastle penal settlement for much of the period from 1811 to 1818, Vaux compiled two works.

The first was a dictionary of 'flash' or cant language originally written for use by the commandant of the penal settlement in performing his magisterial duties. A new but unaltered edition was issued in 2008 under the Verbivore imprint, owned and operated by Gordon Balfour Haynes of Australia; it was reissued in 2016. An edited edition by Simon Barnard was republished in 2019 as James Hardy Vaux's 1819 Dictionary of Criminal Slang.

He next compiled his memoirs, which he titled Memoirs of the First Thirty-Two Years of The Life of James Hardy Vaux, A Swindler and Pickpocket; Now Transported for the Second Time, and For Life, to New South Wales. On completing the manuscript, he dedicated his work to the commandant of the penal settlement, who had apparently encouraged Vaux to compile his memoirs.

In 1819 the manuscript of Vaux's memoirs, together with the dictionary of 'flash' language, were published in London by John Murray as Memoirs of James Hardy Vaux, written by himself. The memoirs were republished by John Hunt in 1827 and reprinted in 1829 and 1830. Since Vaux's death, the memoirs were again republished in 1964 with an introduction and editorial notes by Noel McLachlan.

The first full-length autobiography written in Australia, Vaux's memoirs provide a unique insight into criminal life in London and the convict penal system. In 1827 the London Magazine described Vaux's work as 'one of the most singular that ever issued from the press'.

The musical play, Flash Jim Vaux, by Australian playwright Ron Blair demonstrated part of Vaux's colourful life. It was first performed by the Nimrod Theatre in 1971.

== See also ==
- List of convicts transported to Australia
