= Daylight Saving (play) =

Play by Nick Enright

- Original language: English
- Written by: Nick Enright
- Genre: comedy
- Setting: Pittwater

Premiere
- Date: 1989
- Place: Ensemble Theatre, Sydney

Daylight Saving is a comedy by Nick Enright about a married couple living in north Sydney. It was one of Enright's most popular works.
