= Les Emigres aux Terres Australes =

- Written by: Citizen Gamas
- Original language: French

Premiere
- Date premiered: 1792
- Place premiered: Theatre des Amis de la Patrie, the Rue de Louvois, France

Les Emigres aux Terres Australes (English: The Emigrants to the Southern Lands) is a 1792 French stage play by Citizen Gamas. The play had a fortnight's run as in the Theatre des Amis de la Patrie, in the Rue de Louvois.

== Background ==
It was the first play to be set in colonial Australia and is sometimes referred to as the first Australian play.

The subtitle was Le Dernier Chapitre d’une Grande Révolution, Comedie (The Last Chapter of a Great Revolution, a Comedy).

== Notes ==
- L. A. TRIEBEL, LES ÉMIGRÉS AUX TERRES AUSTRALES, French Studies, Volume 1, Issue 4, October 1947, Pages 381–b–382, https://doi.org/10.1093/fs/1.4.381-b
- Gamas, Citizen.; Clancy, Patricia A. (1984), "xv, 29, 29 p.; 25 cm.", The first "Australian" play : Les emigres aux terres australes (1792), Monash Australiana series, Clayton, Vic: Dept. of English, Monash University, nla.obj-2498461012 – via Trove
