= Summer Rain (musical) =

- Music: Terence Clarke
- Lyrics: Nick Enright
- Book: Nick Enright
- Setting: 26 December 1945
- Premiere: 1983: National Institute of Dramatic Art, Sydney
- Productions: Sydney 1989 Brisbane 1997 Sydney 2005

Summer Rain is a musical with book and lyrics by Australian playwright Nick Enright and music by Terence Clarke.

Set in New South Wales, Australia, it's Boxing Day 1945 in Turnaround Creek, an outback town. The dust settles as the town nurses their Christmas hangover. Harold Slocum and his family of the Slocum's Travelling Tent Show are down on their luck and become stranded. They're broke and desperate for an audience; they end up in Turnaround Creek. To the country folk, the prospect of a show is a welcome diversion, but Barry the publican at the Shamrock is strangely unwelcoming. He remembers the last time the Slocums were in the district. Emotions run high and the sedentary life of the town is disturbed by the remembrance of an illicit affair. The musical represses new life breathed into the rural community, and is altogether humorous and sensitive.

== Background ==
Originally written in 1983 for Australia's National Institute of Dramatic Art for the graduating students, the musical has since had professional productions: twice in Sydney (Sydney Theatre Company in 1989 and 2005) and once in Brisbane (Queensland Theatre Company in 1997). Its many amateur and student productions include Western Australian Academy of Performing Arts in 2000, University of Wollongong in 2004, Australian Institute of Music in 2014 and Shellharbour's Roo Theatre in 2014.

Although no cast recording of has been made, the Australian Broadcasting Corporation broadcast a live performance of the 1989 Sydney production on radio. Performers such as Nancye Hayes and David Campbell have recorded the song "Once in a Blue Moon" in solo albums. A 1994 television special on Australian musicals incorporated performances of both "Once in a Blue Moon" and "You Might Miss the Mongrel". The book and lyrics were published by Currency Press.

== Reception ==
Variety said of Sydney Theatre Company's production "the women's roles especially are well-written and the numerous reworkings have ensured the story is tight and focused".

Lauren's Theatre Reviews described Roo Theatre's production of the show as "certain very enjoyable for the most part" and "the script has its ups and down, but ultimately is full of charm and a wide variety of main characters", with praise going to the story's characterisation and mix of both drama and comedy. The music of the show received mixed reception, the review noting feeble songs in the playlist. It listed stand-out examples of the score and said that the rest are unmemorable.

Academia says that the show "honours the musical styles and experiences of a previous Australian generation. This chapter explores the ironic, parodic way that it creates the Australian musical that never existed, a generation after it should have. Australian audiences of the 1940s and 1950s loved the Hollywood musical, and the great American Broadway musicals of the period. It was also a time when the old vaudeville troupes that travelled outback Australia were dying. The songs in Summer Rain deliberately reference both Hollywood and Australian traditions, lightly parodying them in 'Watch the Puddles', or improving them in 'The Casuarina Tree'. At the same time, Enright's musical presents a more modest and laconic Australian attitude, tongue in cheek, and always light-hearted. This story of renewal, forgiveness and recovery after war and drought retrospectively promises a better future for the postwar generation. This chapter analyses some of the patterns of parody and allusion in the play, while arguing that its detailed reference to the language and history of the period prevents it from becoming mere pastiche, and that its humour undercuts its sentimentality."

== Synopsis ==
=== Act I ===
The show begins as The Slocum Family and their troupe perform a show on Christmas Eve ("The Show Goes On"). After the show, the troupe all quit when Harold Slocum, the father of the troupe, reveals that he is unable to pay them. Broke and nowhere to go, Harold, his wife Ruby and his two children of a previous marriage, Johnny and Joy travel to an outback town west of Sydney called Turnaround Creek when Harold suddenly gets the idea. On Boxing Day in Turnaround Creek, the few inhabitants of the town arrive at the local pub, the Shamrock and rest their heads from the night before ("Nothin' Doin'"). The Slocums arrive and promise to put on a show, but the owner of the Shamrock, the widowed old man Barry Doyle publicly tells them that they aren't welcome in the town. Just after they arrive, it begins raining, which the town gets ecstatic about, saying that they've been facing a seven-year drought ("Send 'Er Down, Hughie!"). After this, most of the town makes the Slocums feel very welcome, and it does not take long before it becomes clear that there are many difficult relationships in Turnaround Creek ("Something on the Wind"). The Slocums give the town a preview performance of their upcoming show ("Tango D'Amour") and afterwards, Harold reminisces on a woman he met in the town once, Barry's dead wife Nancy Doyle, after discovering that she passed not long after he last visited the town 16 years ago ("The Eyes of Nancy Doyle"). After the Slocums have a fun night of drinking with the town's inhabitants ("Hear The One About...?"), Barry confronts Harold about his affair with his wife all those years ago. After Ruby breaks them apart before a physical confrontation, Barry reminisces when he met his wife ("The Eyes of Nancy Keenan"). The next day, Joy Slocum strikes up a romantic relationship with the town bookie Clarrie Nugent ("Watch The Puddles") and Johnny Slocum continues to make strong advances toward Barry's eldest daughter, Peg Hartigan, who is already married to Mick Hartigan ("Summer Rain").

=== Act II ===
The Slocums perform their show with songs by Harold and Ruby ("Once in a Blue Moon"), Joy and Clarrie ("Dark Handsome Chappie") and the Slocum family ("At The End of the Parade"). After very positive reception from most of the town's residents, Harold agrees on behalf of the whole family to stay in the town to celebrate New Years. Ruby laments how she misses the man Harold used to be ("Abracadabra Man"), as Peg is torn between her husband and Johnny ("Dark Handsome Stranger"). Barry sees the yellow dress Peg plans on wearing to New Years and is suddenly reminded of his dead wife ("Casuarina Tree"). The town dances the new year in ("The New Year") and afterward, Ruby and Nancy Doyle's sister Renie McKenna complain about the men in their lives, Harold and Barry respectively ("You Might Miss The Mongrel"). Harold and Barry soon reconcile ("Morning in Her Eyes") after Barry confesses that his youngest daughter Cathy is actually the biological daughter of Harold and Joy decides whether to stay in Turnaround Creek with Clarrie or leave with her family, while Cathy also chooses between staying in the town or leaving with the Slocums and Peg struggles to stay with Mick or leave with Johnny ("The Word on the Wind"). The next day, the Slocums except Joy say their goodbyes to Turnaround Creek. Peg stays with Mick and after the Slocums leave, Barry reveals that Cathy is gone as the town watch the Slocums' truck drive away.

== Musical numbers ==
Act I
	Song	Performer(s)
1	"Overture"	Orchestra
2	"The Show Goes On"	Harold, Ruby, Johnny, Joy, Texas, Diamantina, Cora, Magda, Cecil
3	"Nothin' Doin'"	Peg, Mick, Clarrie, Barry, Cathy, Lorna, Red, Renie
4	"Send 'Er Down, Hughie!"	Red, Mick, Barry, Clarrie, Peg, Lorna, Harold, Ruby, Johnny, Joy, Maisie
5	"Something on the Wind"	Peg, Renie, Cathy
6	"Tango D'Amour"	Ruby, Johnny, Joy
7	"The Eyes of Nancy Doyle"	Harold
8	"Hear The One About...?"	Red, Renie, Clarrie, Harold, Ruby, Johnny, Joy, Maisie, Peg
9	"The Eyes of Nancy Keenan"	Barry
10	"Watch The Puddles"	Joy, Clarrie
11	"Summer Rain"	Johnny, Peg

Act II
	Song	Performer(s)
12	"Once in a Blue Moon"	Harold, Ruby
13	"Dark Handsome Chappie"	Joy, Clarrie
14	"At The End of the Parade"	Johnny, Harold, Ruby, Joy
15	"Abracadabra Man"	Ruby
16	"Dark Handsome Stranger"	Peg, Johnny
17	"The Casuarina Tree"	Barry
18	"The New Year"	Company
19	"You Might Miss The Mongrel"	Ruby, Renie
20	"Morning in Her Eyes"	Harold, Barry
21	"The Word on the Wind"	Maisie, Joy, Cathy, Lorna, Peg
22	"Nine Day Wonder"	Peg, Johnny, Mick, Lorna, Red, Harold, Ruby, Joy, Maisie, Renie, Clarrie, Barry

Not including the brief reprises

== Characters ==
Characters
Character	Voice	Description
Harold Slocum	Tenor	The father and proprietor of the Slocum Theatre Troupe. After the rest of the troupe leave him, his wife and children from his previous marriage, he suddenly gets the idea to travel to Turnaround Creek to perhaps meet up with a woman he met during his last visit sixteen years ago. He arrives to the town with less than a warm welcome from the woman's husband, Barry. During the visit, he learns that the woman he knew had died not long after his previous visit. While in the town, he struggles with the relationships he has with his wife, son, daughter and Barry. At the end, he makes peace with them all.
Ruby Slocum	Soprano	Harold's second wife who travels with him to Turnaround Creek. She is very suspicious of her husband's motives and misses the man he used to me. In the end she reconciles with Harold after he apologises for his less than honest behaviour.
Joy Slocum	Alto	Harold's daughter to his first wife, who travels with him to Turnaround Creek. While there, she falls in love with the town bookie Clarrie Nugent and decides to stay there with him.
Johnny Slocum	Tenor	Harold's son of his first marriage who travels with him to Turnaround Creek. While there, Johnny pursues a married woman, Peg Hartigan and asks her to leave the town with him.
Barry Doyle	Bass / Baritone	The publican of Turnaround Creek, who has been widowed for about fifteen years. His wife Nancy Doyle died while giving birth to their third daughter Cathy. He openly tells the Slocum family that they aren't welcome in the town which upsets his daughters and many other people in the town. He struggles in his relationships with his sister-in-law Renie and daughters Cathy and Peg while the Slocums are in town. In the end, he reconciles with Harold and finds romantic interest with Renie.
Peg Hartigan	Mezzo	Barry's eldest daughter who is a waitress at the Shamrock and lives with her husband Mick. Johnny Slocum very openly pursues her and she is torn between him and Mick. Ultimately she decides to stay with Mick.
Mick Hartigan	Bass / Baritone	Peg's husband, a war veteran with a wounded leg. He acts very coldly toward his wife and is the only one who sides with Barry in unwelcoming the Slocums.
Lorna Farrell	Alto	Barry's second daughter, who is pregnant when the show opens. She later gives birth to her first child and names her Nancy after her late mother.
Red Farrell	Tenor	Lorna's husband who works as a farmer in Turnaround Creek. He welcomes the Slocums when the seven-year drought ends. He names his child Nancy after his wife's late mother.
Cathy Doyle	Soprano	Barry's youngest daughter, who asks Harold if she can leave with the troupe when they depart from Turnaround Creek. She is fifteen years old and is tired of the boredom that Turnaround Creek brings.
Clarrie Nugent	Tenor	The bookmaker of Turnaround Creek. He falls in love with Joy Slocum upon her arrival and begins a relationship with her.
Renie McKenna	Mezzo	Sister of Barry's late wife. The aunt of Peg, Lorna and Cathy, Renie acts a mother to three as their real mother died fifteen years ago. She is openly frustrated with Barry's behaviour when the Slocums arrive and later reveals that she has feelings for him.
Miss Maisie Trengrove	Alto	Turnaround Creek's Matriarch.

Other characters include the troupe members from the beginning of the show, such as Bryce Barclay, Texas, Diamantina Price, Cora Price, Magda and Cecil. Other extra townsfolk also inhabit Turnaround Creek.

== See also ==
- Lists of musicals
