= Diving for Pearls (play) =

1991 play by Katherine Thomson

- Original language: English
- Written by: Katherine Thomson

Premiere
- Date: 1991
- Place: Australia

Diving for Pearls is an Australian play by Katherine Thomson set against the background of the economic rationalism of the 1980s, in Port Kembla. It became one of the most popular Australian plays of the 1990s.
