= Miracle City =

Musical by Nick Enright

Miracle City is a musical with book and lyrics by Nick Enright and music by Max Lambert.

== Synopsis ==
It is conceived as a real time, live-to-air Christian television show Ministry of Miracles hosted by Tennessee evangelical family Ricky and Lora Lee Truswell (inspired by Jimmy and Tammy Faye Bakker) and their children Loretta and Ricky-Bob. Ex-con turned evangelist Ricky Truswell has a dream is to build Miracle City, a Christian theme park. But behind the wholesome facade is darker problems. While potential salvation arrives in the form of Reverend Millard Sizemore, it comes at a terrible price, with Sizemore asking something awful in return.

== Productions ==
The Sydney Theatre Company (STC) debuted Miracle City in a four-week workshop production at its small Wharf 2 theatre in 1996. It featured Tom Burlinson, Genevieve Lemon and Peter Carroll, and was directed by Gale Edwards. The season was supported with funding from producer Cameron Mackintosh for the development of new Australian musicals. While it was highly acclaimed, the musical did not have a further life at the time.

A small production at the Hayes Theatre in Sydney in 2014 was its first revival since the original STC production, and generated a cast recording.

A new production of Miracle City featuring Missy Higgins was performed at the Sydney Opera House's Studio in October 2017.
