= Murder of Leigh Leigh =

1989 murder in New South Wales, Australia

- School photograph of Leigh Leigh, as seen in media
- Date: 3 November 1989
- Location: Stockton Beach, New South Wales, Australia; 32°54′04″S 151°47′20″E
- Cause: Sexual assault, blunt trauma
- Deaths: Leigh Leigh (aged 14 years)
- Inquiries: New South Wales Crime Commission (March 1998); Police Integrity Commission (October 2000)
- Convicted: 1. "NC1"; 2. Matthew Grant Webster; 3. Guy Charles Wilson
- Convictions: 1. Having sex with a person under the age of consent 2. Murder; 3. Assault
- Sentence: 1. 100 hours community service 2. 20 years custody; 14 years non-parole period; released in June 2004; 3. Six months custody; released 1990

The murder of Leigh Leigh, born Leigh Rennea Mears, occurred on 3 November 1989 while she was attending a 16-year-old boy's birthday party at Stockton Beach, New South Wales, on the east coast of Australia. The 14-year-old girl from Fern Bay was assaulted by a group of boys after she returned distressed from a sexual encounter on the beach that a reviewing judge later called non-consensual. After being kicked and spat on by the group, Leigh left the party. Her naked body was found in the sand dunes nearby the following morning, with severe genital damage and a crushed skull.

Matthew Grant Webster, an 18-year-old who acted as a bouncer at the event, pleaded guilty to her murder and was sentenced to 20 years in prison with a 14-year non-parole period. He was released on parole in June 2004, after serving 14½ years. Guy Charles Wilson, the other bouncer and only other person aged over 18 at the party, pleaded guilty to assault; a third male (aged 15) pleaded guilty to having sex with a minor. The investigation of Leigh's murder proved controversial, however, as several people who admitted to various crimes, including assaulting Leigh, were never charged; nor was anyone ever charged with her sexual assault. Webster's confession did not match the forensic evidence. The murder investigation was reviewed by the New South Wales Crime Commission in 1996, and by the Police Integrity Commission in 1998, with the latter recommending the dismissal of the detective in charge of the investigation.

Leigh's murder received considerable attention in the media. Initially focusing on her sexual assault and murder, media attention later concentrated more on the lack of parental supervision and the drugs and alcohol at the party, and on Leigh's sexuality. The media coverage of the murder has been cited as an example of blaming the victim. Leigh's murder inspired a theatrical play entitled A Property of the Clan, which was later revised and renamed Blackrock, as well as a feature film of the same name.

== Background ==
Leigh Leigh, born Leigh Rennea Mears on 24 July 1975, was the daughter of Robyn Lynne Maunsell and Robert William Mears. Her parents divorced when she was about seven years old, and her surname was later changed to Leigh as this was the surname of her younger half-sister's father. At the time of her death she lived with her half-sister, mother and stepfather Brad Shearman in Fern Bay. Leigh was a Year Eight student at Newcastle High School. Leigh's family described her as a "typical teenager" who enjoyed school.

== Night of the murder ==
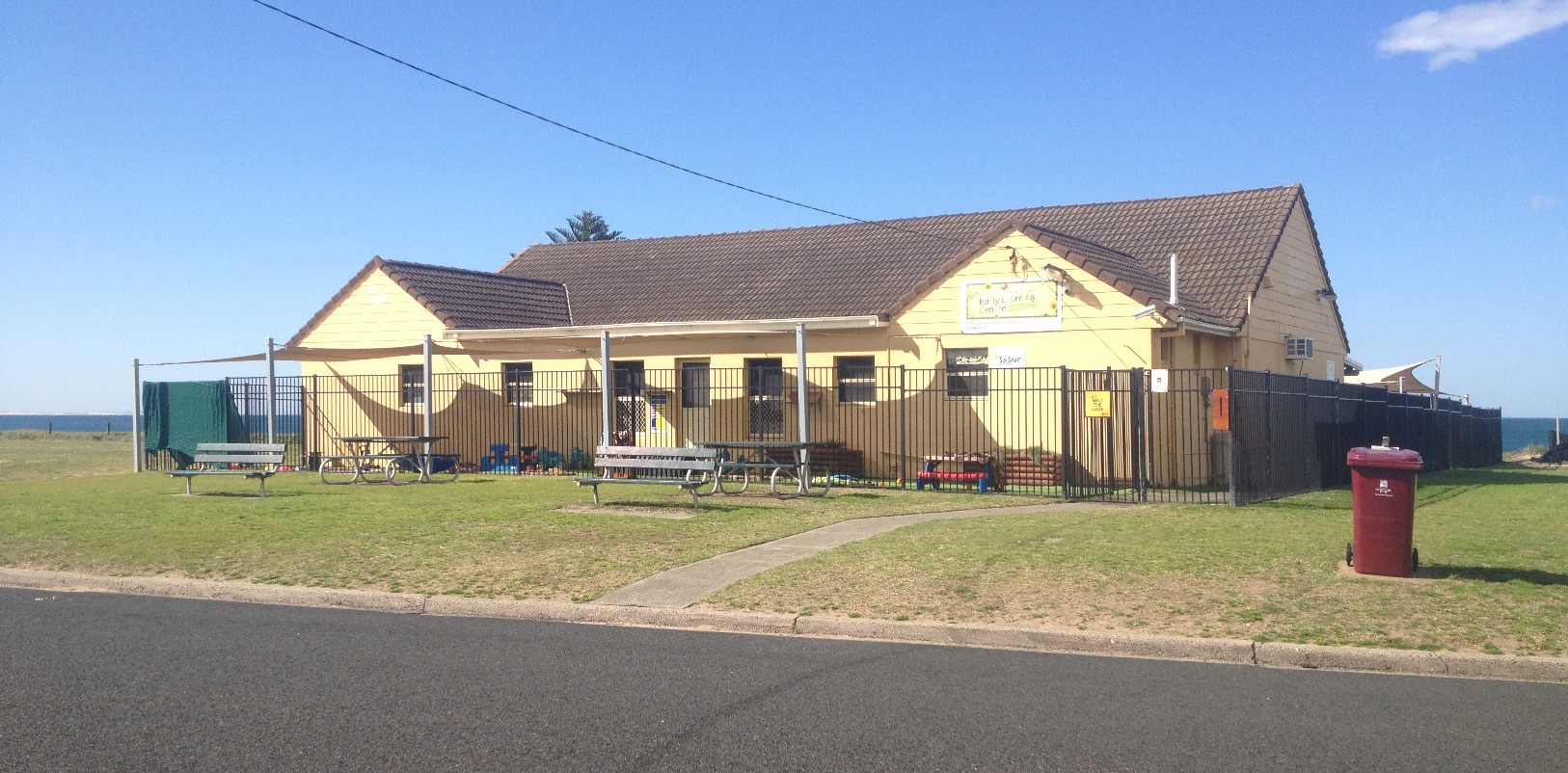
The building where the party was held, pictured in 2014. After the murder, it was disused before being turned into a childcare centre in the mid-1990s. It was demolished in 2019.

Newcastle High School student Jason Robertson's 16th birthday party was held on 3 November 1989 at the North Stockton Surf Club, a formerly abandoned building which the Stockton Lions Club had taken over four years prior, leasing it for various functions. Police estimated that about 60 people had attended the party, though figures as high as 100 were reported in the media. Most of the attendees were Year Ten students from Newcastle High School, though two 10-year-olds were seen at the party at one point. Many were drinking alcohol and smoking marijuana, and some were having sex.

Fourteen-year-old Leigh had a written invitation to attend the party and permission from her mother to stay there until 11 pm; Leigh's mother had been assured that responsible adults would be present at the party. Matthew Webster and Guy Wilson, who acted as bouncers, were the only people aged over 18 at the party. Leigh was said to be very excited, as it was the first teenage party she had attended. According to police witness reports, Leigh was one of several under-age girls who were invited to the party for the purpose of getting them intoxicated and having sex with them. According to a police report, Webster approached another person at the party and said, "Hey dude, we're going to get Leigh pissed and all go through her." Leigh was also one of several under-age people for whom an adult purchased alcohol before the party; she and her friend were given a bottle of Jim Beam whiskey, which they then mixed with Coca-Cola. She was reported to have gotten heavily intoxicated very quickly. A 15-year-old boy, who for legal reasons could not be named and was referred to in official documentation as 'NC1', is quoted to have said, "I'm going to go and fuck [Leigh]." Shortly afterwards Leigh went to the beach with NC1; witnesses stated Leigh was so intoxicated that he "had to almost carry her".

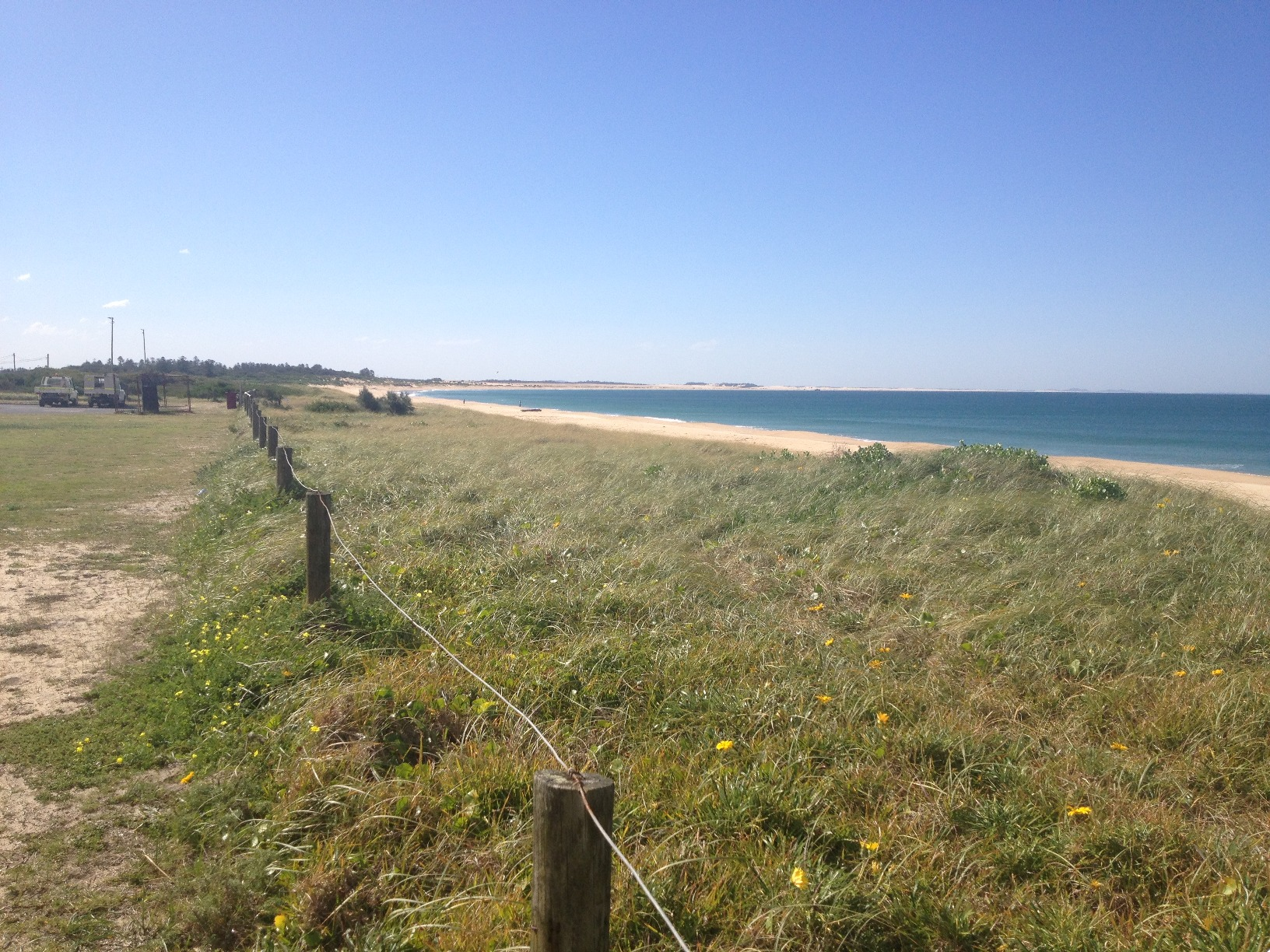
Stockton Beach as seen from the surf club facing north, the direction that Leigh headed after leaving the party

When Leigh returned from the beach, she was bleeding between her legs, distressed, crying and seeking assistance. Some people at the party reported trying to console Leigh and find out what had happened to her; Leigh "asserted she had been raped", replying "[NC1] fucked me" and "I hate him". After witnessing Leigh's complaints, Webster is quoted as saying to a group of boys "she's a bit of a slut and why don't all of us have a go". Nineteen-year-old Guy Wilson then approached Leigh, placed his arm around her and asked her for sex. Wilson pushed Leigh to the ground when she refused, and was joined by Webster and around ten other boys who surrounded Leigh. They yelled abuse, kicked her, poured beer on her and spat both beer and saliva on her. Several people witnessed the assault, yet nobody came to help her or attempted to contact the police, her parents or other adults. The assaults continued for approximately five minutes; Leigh stood up when they stopped and staggered away before picking up an empty beer bottle and throwing it at the group of boys, missing them. Guy Wilson threw a beer bottle back at her as she left, which either hit her in the leg or missed, according to different witness accounts. The group of boys followed her inside the crowded clubhouse where she sought refuge, and similar assaults continued. Leigh was seen leaving the club and walking towards the beach at about 10:30pm. Leigh's stepfather arrived at the party to pick her up at 10:50pm. He and several of the party-goers searched for Leigh, but she could not be found. After repeated search attempts, Leigh's mother and stepfather decided to wait for her to return home, assuming she had gone to a friend's house for the night. Leigh's stepfather recommenced the search for Leigh the following morning, aided by several youths from the party. Her body was found in the sand dunes about 90 metres (300 ft) north of the surf club. Leigh's invitation to attend the party was still in her pocket.

Leigh was found naked except for her socks and shoes, with her knickers and shorts around her right ankle. She was on her back with her legs apart. Her bra, which had its securing hook bent, was found nearby, as was her shirt and jumper, which were intertwined, inside out and stained with liquor. Saltbushes nearby had been flattened. According to the police forensics report, a blood-stained rock weighing 5.6 kg (12 lb) was found next to her, and blood stains were found up to 2.8 metres (9.2 ft) from her body.

=== Postmortem ===
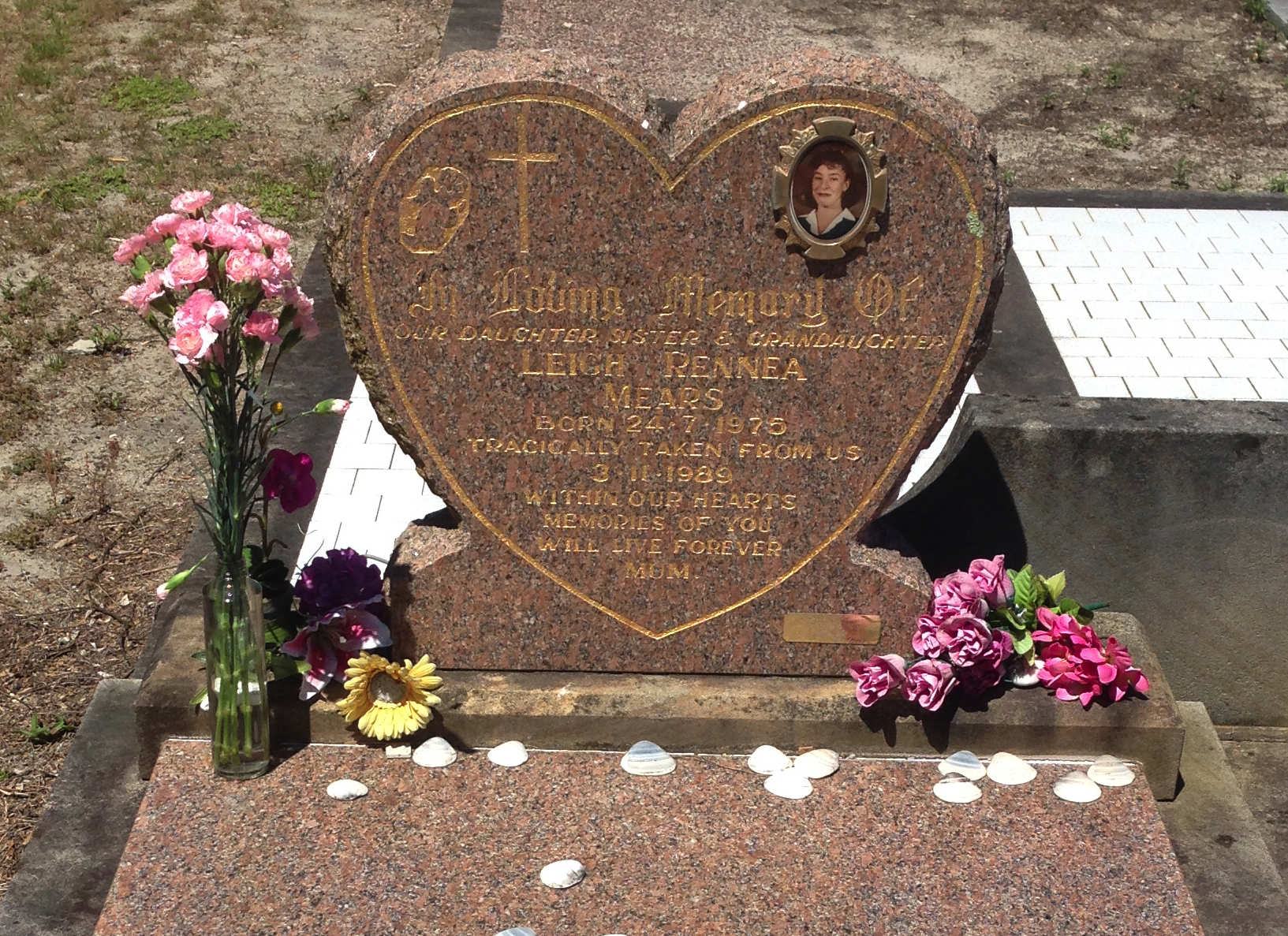
Leigh's grave at the Stockton General Cemetery.

The postmortem report stated Leigh's cause of death to be a fractured skull and injury to the brain. Leigh had been struck with great force several times, including at least three times in the head. The postmortem also found that Leigh had asphyxial haemorrhages, and multiple injuries to the jaw, ribs, liver and right kidney. Leigh had neck fingertip pressure injuries, indicating she had been choked before she died, though this was not the cause of death. Leigh's blood alcohol reading was 0.128, a level which, according to the University of Notre Dame, would have caused "significant impairment of motor coordination and loss of good judgment". There was no doubt that Leigh was violently sexually assaulted before she was murdered, and the evidence indicated that prior to the night of her murder she had not had sexual intercourse. Leigh had deep bruising to the left wall of her vagina, extensive bruising to her hymen and two tears, one 20 millimetres (0.79 in) long, to her vulva. An analysis of the postmortem by Dr Johan Duflou, deputy director of the New South Wales Institute of Forensic Medicine, stated that an inflexible object, possibly a beer bottle, was likely to have caused most of her genital injuries. No semen was found in her body.

== Investigation ==
Twenty detectives, led by Detective Sergeant Lance Chaffey, were assigned to the case though the squad was reduced to fewer than ten members several weeks later. Crime reporter Mark Riley wrote that police were going through the "exhaustive process" of cross-checking the stories of several dozen teenagers; by 5 November police had interviewed around 40 teenagers, stating they expected to interview around 20 more. The three suspects who emerged early in the investigation were Matthew Webster, Guy Wilson and NC1. In interviews on 5 November, NC1 admitted to having sex with Leigh, but said it was consensual. Wilson initially denied any wrongdoing, though in a later interview he admitted to pushing Leigh, pouring beer over her, spitting on her and throwing an empty beer bottle at her. Webster admitted to pouring beer on Leigh, but denied sexually assaulting or killing her. He originally told police he went to a pub after the party, but in an interview eight days later changed his story to state that he had gone for a walk. Webster also stated that two 14-year-old girls had approached him and NC1 at the party, asking for some "hash", and that the two of them had obtained a small bag of resin and exchanged it with the girls for $20. Blood samples were taken from two suspects; The Newcastle Herald reported this as probably the first use of DNA tests in a Hunter Valley murder investigation. Clothing samples were also taken from several suspects.

In her book Who Killed Leigh Leigh?, Kerry Carrington, a criminologist and prominent researcher of the murder, described the investigation as being "fuelled by mutual suspicion and by rumour and counter-rumour". People who attended the party complained of living in fear of being the next rumoured killer; Matthew Webster, Jason Robertson and two other boys appeared on the front page of The Newcastle Herald on 8 November with such complaints. For a time the most popular rumour was that Leigh had been murdered by her stepfather, and that he had been having sex with her for months. In November 1990 Detective Chaffey told journalist Mark Riley that police had heard this rumour so many times that they considered Shearman to be a suspect. Riley's article stated that the community of Stockton harboured suspicions about Shearman right until Webster was charged with murder. On 16 November Webster pleaded guilty to assaulting Leigh and to supplying cannabis resin to a minor. He was released on bail, with his sentencing scheduled for 21 February 1990. On 19 January Wilson pleaded guilty to assaulting Leigh; he was released on bail pending sentencing. On 28 January, upon being taunted by four boys regarding the murder, Webster assaulted one of them. On 31 January, Brad Shearman approached Guy Wilson in public, and punched him in the head three times after Wilson allegedly told him he would get Leigh's younger sister next. Shearman was charged and pleaded guilty to assault.

While he was still on bail on 16 February 1990, during his third interview with police, Webster admitted to killing Leigh. In the interview transcript, Webster initially denied killing Leigh, then "without being asked a further question" he stated, "Well, I did it. But I just can't believe ... it happened. It's just unbelievable." Webster went on to state that he saw Leigh while he was looking for his stash of beers. According to Webster, they walked to the saltbushes together, where he pulled off her clothes and stuck a finger in her vagina. Webster stated he lost his temper when Leigh rebuffed him, choking her for a while before killing her with a rock, specifically saying he killed Leigh because he "thought she would squeal on [him] for trying to rape her". After spending the weekend in a police cell, Webster appeared in court on 19 February where he was refused bail. On 21 March, while in custody, Webster was convicted and fined $250 for offensive behaviour in the 28 January assault. On 17 July Shearman was given a 12-month good behaviour bond for the 31 January assault; the judge did not record a conviction, taking into consideration that he had been provoked into attacking Wilson.

== Convictions ==
NC1 was the first to be sentenced, on 28 February 1990, after pleading guilty to having sex with someone under the age of consent. He was given six months' custody in a detention centre, the maximum possible sentence for a youth charged with that offence. Kerry Carrington and Andrew Johnson, writing in The Australian Feminist Law Journal, said it was likely that prosecutors did not charge NC1 with rape, as a conviction on such a charge would have been unlikely due to a lack of evidence; Leigh's complaints about the incident as reported by witnesses were hearsay and therefore inadmissible in court. On 11 May the sentence was reduced on appeal to 100 hours' community service. In reducing his sentence the judge stated the evidence obliged him to find that the sex was consensual, and that it was better for NC1 to do something positive for the community rather than possibly being led further astray in custody. A number of sources state the judge reached the conclusion that the sex had been consensual because of the inadequate way the evidence was presented to the court. On 19 March 1990 Wilson was sentenced to six months' imprisonment for assaulting Leigh.

Charges were initially laid against Webster for sexual assault, though by the time the case went to trial they had been dropped without public explanation. Hillary Byrne-Armstrong, writing in The Australian Feminist Law Journal, stated it was likely that Webster was offered a plea bargain that would drop the lesser charges in exchange for his guilty plea for murder. Webster pleaded guilty to Leigh's murder on 24 October 1990. The guilty plea meant that no witnesses were called for the trial; Detective Chaffey instead read a list of facts to the court. Justice James Roland Wood sentenced Webster to a minimum of 14 years in prison, with an additional six years during which he would be eligible for parole, saying that a life sentence was inappropriate in view of Webster's potential to be rehabilitated. Wood found that Webster's motivation for killing Leigh was his fear she would report his sexual assault. Five Stockton citizens volunteered to give character evidence at his trial, describing the 120 kg (265 lb) teenager as a quiet "gentle giant" from a good family. Others expressed amazement at this description of Webster, who was also known as "fat Matt, the thug of Stockton". Webster served his sentence at Parklea Correctional Centre.

While acknowledging that plea bargains such as the one Webster was probably offered are common and help avoid expensive and time-consuming trials, Byrne-Armstrong stated that accepting Webster's confession helped create a legal fiction that he unquestionably acted alone in both sexually assaulting and murdering Leigh. The actual level of sexual violence that Leigh sustained was accordingly, she said, "all but erased" from the sentencing, and it appeared Justice Wood had only been given the limited information from the post-mortem report that would have corroborated Webster's confession.

Webster was the first person in New South Wales to be sentenced under the "truth in sentencing" legislation, which meant he could not be released under any circumstances before the end of his 14-year non-parole period; under the previous legislation a person of Webster's age would probably have been released after only nine years. Webster appealed the length of his prison term to the New South Wales Court of Criminal Appeal, where Justices Gleeson, Lee and Allen dismissed his appeal in July 1992. In their view the crime was "so gross that nothing less of a very severe sentence would accord with the general moral sense of the community".

Webster's first application for parole in February 2004 was denied as he had not yet undertaken work release. After completing a few months of this program, Webster was released on parole on 10 June 2004 after serving 14½ years. The conditions of his parole specified that he would only be allowed to visit Newcastle or Stockton with permission from his probation and parole officer. Webster's parole was discussed in the Parliament of New South Wales, with Minister John Hatzistergos responding to queries and concluding that the option to supervise Webster's re-integration into society was better than the alternative of releasing him without supervision at the end of his sentence. Following his release, Leigh's family stated they harboured "no ill thoughts" towards Webster and wished him well in the "re-establishment of his life". Webster's parole was revoked in November 2004 after he was arrested for assault; he pleaded not guilty, citing self-defence. He was released from prison in May 2005 after the charges were dropped due to insufficient evidence.

== Media coverage ==
Leigh's death received widespread and ongoing coverage in both the Sydney and Newcastle media, possibly due to a fascination with her reduplicated name. Between 1989 and 1994, The Newcastle Herald ran at least 39 stories on Leigh, 23 of them featured on the front page. At least ten articles on the case were published in The Sydney Morning Herald during the same period. Both the extended media coverage and the theatrical plays and film the murder inspired have led to it being termed a "celebrity crime", and to Leigh being referred to as a "celebrity victim". In 1996 Psychologist Roger Peters attributed the media fascination to the sense of community in Stockton, and due to the crimes being committed by people not considered to be typical criminals, stating "I think one of the main things is that people can identify with people involved. Had it been a criminal from outside who stalked her and killed I think it would be long forgotten."

Various sources considered the media coverage prior to Webster's arrest to be focused on finding something to blame other than her murderer. After Webster's arrest the media continued to search for any outside agency that might have been responsible for the event. From the beginning, media reports highlighted the lack of parental supervision at the party, and in sentencing Webster, Justice Wood made comments criticising the lack of parental supervision. Researchers Jonathan Morrow and Mehera San Roque in the Sydney Law Review wrote that Wood's comments "might as well have been quoted from the very newspapers that were covering the crime"; his comments, in turn, were heavily reported in the media. Webster's sentencing also received considerable media coverage, possibly due to his youth and the length of his sentence, as well as curiosity about the newly established "truth-in-sentencing" principles. His appeal regarding the length of his sentence received similar coverage.

According to observations by Kerry Carrington and Andrew Johnson, media references to Leigh being sexually assaulted "almost completely disappeared" in less than a year, as did the references to her being assaulted by the group of boys. They stated that the fact that NC1 was not charged with raping Leigh had created the legal fiction that his sex with her was consensual. The "unsustainable assumption" that Leigh consented to sex was the turning point in her being blamed for her own assault and murder on the grounds that, because she was supposedly sexually promiscuous, Leigh had somehow "asked for [the attack]". In addition to sexual promiscuity and the lack of parental supervision, Carrington states that media attention also shifted to the presence of drugs and alcohol at the party; Morrow and San Roque credit media attention to these factors as taking attention away from the abuse that Leigh suffered before she died. The epithet slut in a pretrial psychological report also became a topic of focus for the media:

Webster attacked Leigh, not so much because she would not let him have sex with her but because she became the living proof that even a slut, a property of the clan, thought he was not good enough to have sex with.

— Psychological report on Matthew Webster

Carrington accused the media of completely missing the point that the report was not stating the views of the psychiatrist, rather it was the psychiatrist's interpretation of Webster's feelings. She also considered Mark Riley's extended coverage of the case, which she described at one point as "journalistic voyeurism", to be the most profound case of shifting the blame from the assailants to Leigh herself. One of Riley's articles in particular was considered by her to have suggested that Leigh's discussions with her mother about sex and Leigh's looks and physical development had contributed to her murder. Morrow and San Roque also criticised Riley's article, stating it "disturbingly ... married parental blame with the well-documented notion that the rape victim herself is presumably to blame for her attack". Several writers, including Eva Cox and Adele Horin, rejected the concept that Leigh was in any way responsible for her sexual assault and murder. The media coverage of the murder has been considered by multiple sources to be part of a wider culture of victim blaming.

== Criticism of police ==
Police were criticised over their handling of the investigation, including their failure to identify perpetrators in a timely manner. It took police over three months to press charges against Webster even though they had established within ten days that he had lied about his whereabouts, had publicly stated his intention to rape Leigh, and had the opportunity to commit the crime.

Criticism was also raised regarding the relatively few convictions. Despite several people's admissions to police that they physically attacked Leigh at the party, only Wilson was charged with assault, and the adult who admitted to supplying her with alcohol prior to the party was never charged. NC1 admitted to having sex with another under-age girl at the party, though he was not charged with that offence. With the exception of the charges against Webster that were dropped without explanation, nobody was ever charged with raping or sexually assaulting Leigh in spite of the presence of graphic forensic evidence of genital injuries. During a report on Radio National, Leigh's mother said that when she asked Detective Chaffey why others were not being charged, he asked her if she knew "how much it costs to run an investigation".

=== Forensic testing ===
Police took blood and clothing samples from suspects, including the shirt Wilson was wearing on the night of the murder, which he admitted had a bloodstain on it, but it is not known whether any DNA tests were carried out. Kerry Carrington speculated that the reports of evidence being sent for testing may have been a fabrication to obtain a confession. Leigh's grandmother told Carrington that she called Scotland Yard to enquire about the results, as a detective on the case had informed Leigh's family that this was where the suspects' clothing had been sent. Scotland Yard informed her that they had not received anything from Australia for forensic testing in the relevant timespan.

The only record of forensic testing that has been uncovered is an acknowledgement by a forensic biologist of four items being received for testing on 6 November 1989: three items of Leigh's clothing, and the blood-stained rock found near her body. The acknowledgement, however, indicates that other items were not sent for testing. Results from the supposed tests were never made available, nor was information on why the other items were not sent. According to Carrington, four years after the investigation a detective involved in the case told her that none of the samples taken from suspects were tested. Samples taken from Webster were not used in his prosecution. Professor Harry Boettcher, a forensic scientist, said that if police did not actually test the samples it would be "professional negligence – indefensible". In 2009 a solicitor who acted on behalf of Leigh's family stated that given the advances in DNA testing technology, it was time to re-examine the evidence.

=== Possibility of accomplices ===
Several factors have led to speculation that Webster was not alone when he killed Leigh. According to the transcript of Webster's confession, he was never asked if he acted alone. Carrington accused police of accepting Webster's confession at face value, ignoring both forensic and witness evidence. Her investigations highlighted several discrepancies in Webster's confession, and in the forensic evidence. For example, Webster stated in his confession that he had choked Leigh with his left hand as he knelt beside her although, according to the autopsy report, the bruises on Leigh's neck were consistent with being choked with a right hand. Carrington also questioned Webster's statement that he walked along lit streets to the other side of the Stockton peninsula to wash his bloodstained hands, when he could have washed his hands in total darkness at the beach less than 100 metres (330 ft) away. She also queried his claim that he had blood on his hands but none on his clothes, despite Leigh having been struck so hard blood was splattered 2.8 metres one way from her body and 1.3 metres the other way. Webster stated that he walked to the beach with Leigh, though according to police reports four witnesses said she walked to the beach alone; two witnesses stated they saw Webster and Wilson leave the surf club together. Neither NC1 nor Wilson had a reliable alibi for their whereabouts at the time of the murder; Wilson told police he was alone on the beach when Leigh walked past him as she left the club, minutes before she was murdered. Webster's statement that he only penetrated Leigh with his finger has been considered by various sources to be inconsistent with the autopsy findings of genital trauma, and the trauma is also inconsistent with NC1's account that his sex with her was consensual. In reviewing the autopsy, Boettcher said that the numerous blows which killed Leigh came from multiple directions, and were probably inflicted with different items, indicating the possibility of more than one perpetrator.

Carrington and Johnson speculated that Leigh was assaulted by the group of boys after returning from the beach, as punishment for complaining about being raped, and was murdered by Webster and two others because they were afraid she would tell other people. They refused to specifically name the two other suspects for fear of legal repercussions, though clarified that one had sexually assaulted Leigh earlier in the night, and the other likely sexually assaulted her with a beer bottle before she died, as punishment for publicly refusing to have sex with him. Webster talked to the media about the murder for the first time in 1997, and insisted that he acted alone in killing Leigh.

== Aftermath ==
After being told that nobody was going to be charged with Leigh's sexual assault, in 1990 Leigh's mother began a campaign for the case to be officially re-investigated. In August 1994, Kerry Carrington sent a 17,000-word document and 300 pages of evidence to the Royal Commission into the New South Wales Police Service, asking for the case to be investigated. The commission was headed by Judge James Roland Wood, though a representative for the commission stated that Wood's involvement in Webster's trial would not affect the outcome of any investigation. In December 1994, a representative for the commission said that after thorough consideration, they would not be investigating the matter.

In May 1993 a victim's compensation case had awarded Leigh's mother and sister a combined total of $29,214. An appeal, aided by Carrington's research, was lodged against the original victim's compensation payout. In May 1995, in a landmark legal decision, Judge Joseph Moore approved the appeal, awarding Leigh's mother and sister an additional $134,048. Moore said the evidence indicated that Leigh rejected NC1's sexual advances, and that "his intercourse with her was without her consent." He also acknowledged that whoever sexually assaulted Leigh had never been brought to justice, and the lack of convictions for assault, specifically naming Jason Robertson and three other boys as those who assaulted her in addition to Webster and Wilson. Leigh's mother abandoned her efforts to have the case re-opened in 1997, citing "exhaustion and survival".

=== NSW Crime Commission ===
In October 1996, Police Minister Paul Whelan made an announcement in the Parliament of New South Wales, stating that the murder would be reviewed by the New South Wales Crime Commission. Acknowledging that nobody had ever been charged with Leigh's sexual assault, Whelan stated the upcoming review was "our one opportunity to right the terrible wrongs that occurred on the night that Leigh died".

In March 1998 the Crime Commission released its findings, stating that the crimes that resulted in convictions occurred substantially in the way described to the courts, that no further charges would be laid as Webster had acted alone in both the murder and the assault that immediately preceded it, and that police had not acted inappropriately in their decision not to charge other persons. It did, however, criticise some police procedures and practices. The review did not comment on the discrepancies between Webster's confession and the forensic evidence, and it did not clarify whether forensic evidence was ever sent for testing. A representative for the Commission refused to comment on whether Wilson's blood-stained shirt was ever tested. One expert opinion obtained by the Commission wrote that it was "likely [Webster] engaged in sexual behaviour which demeaned Leigh and to which he will never admit because he is ashamed and embarrassed", and Dr Johan Duflou said that a finger or penis was unlikely to have caused Leigh's severe genital damage. Hillary Byrne-Armstrong stated that these expert opinions, which contradict Webster's confession, raised questions on how the Commission concluded that Leigh's sexual assault occurred in the manner to which he had confessed, also raising doubts about several of the commission's other findings. The Crime Commission released one of their two reports on the matter; their second unpublished report was handed over to the Police Integrity Commission (PIC) for investigation.

=== Police Integrity Commission ===
Twenty-six people, mainly police officers, were interviewed in 1998 as part of the subsequent PIC inquiry. Several witnesses from the party, as well as Webster, Wilson and NC1 were also questioned. The inquiry heard allegations that police assaulted four people during interviews: Webster, Wilson, NC1 and another unnamed suspect referred to as NC5, a relative of Webster who was 17 at the time of the murder. Admitting to the inquiry that he killed Leigh and insisting that he was alone in doing so, Webster stated that police repeatedly punched and kicked him when he refused to confess to her murder. According to Scott Tucker writing in The Newcastle Herald, police were also accused of threatening violence, falsifying reports and withholding evidence; one of the officers being investigated had his police locker raided by internal affairs, who discovered several records on the murder that had previously been listed as missing. Carrington was also summoned to give evidence, though she was not informed why; her book, Who Killed Leigh Leigh, which criticised police over their handling of the investigation, had been released earlier that year. Carrington was cross-examined for three days, longer than any of the police officers who were questioned, in what was described by Hillary Byrne-Armstrong as "an inquisition on just about every word she had spoken [or] written" in relation to Leigh's murder". Byrne-Armstrong accused the PIC of summoning Carrington for the sole purpose of attacking her credibility on issues they had no intention of investigating, and to discredit someone who had attracted considerable media attention for criticising police.

The PIC released their review in October 2000. The review recommended the dismissal of Detective Sergeant Chaffey for "gross dereliction" of duty, also recommending criminal charges against five other investigative officers. The review stated that Webster was falsely arrested, as police arrested him for the purpose of questioning, something for which they did not have the power, and that he was probably assaulted by police while he was in custody. Police received further criticism after it was uncovered that they had interviewed NC1 without contacting his parents, and did not question him about Leigh's murder, only about his intercourse with her. Following the review, Chaffey retired "a little earlier than [he] intended", but dismissed the review's findings, stating he was proud of his team's performance. In October 2001, the Director of Public Prosecutions declined to press criminal charges against any of the officers, on the grounds they had suffered emotional hardship and their careers had already been destroyed. The case, which was described on PM as "one of the longest ever investigations into police conduct in New South Wales", prompted changes in the New South Wales Police Force, including the reform of record-keeping procedures.

== Theatrical and film adaptations ==
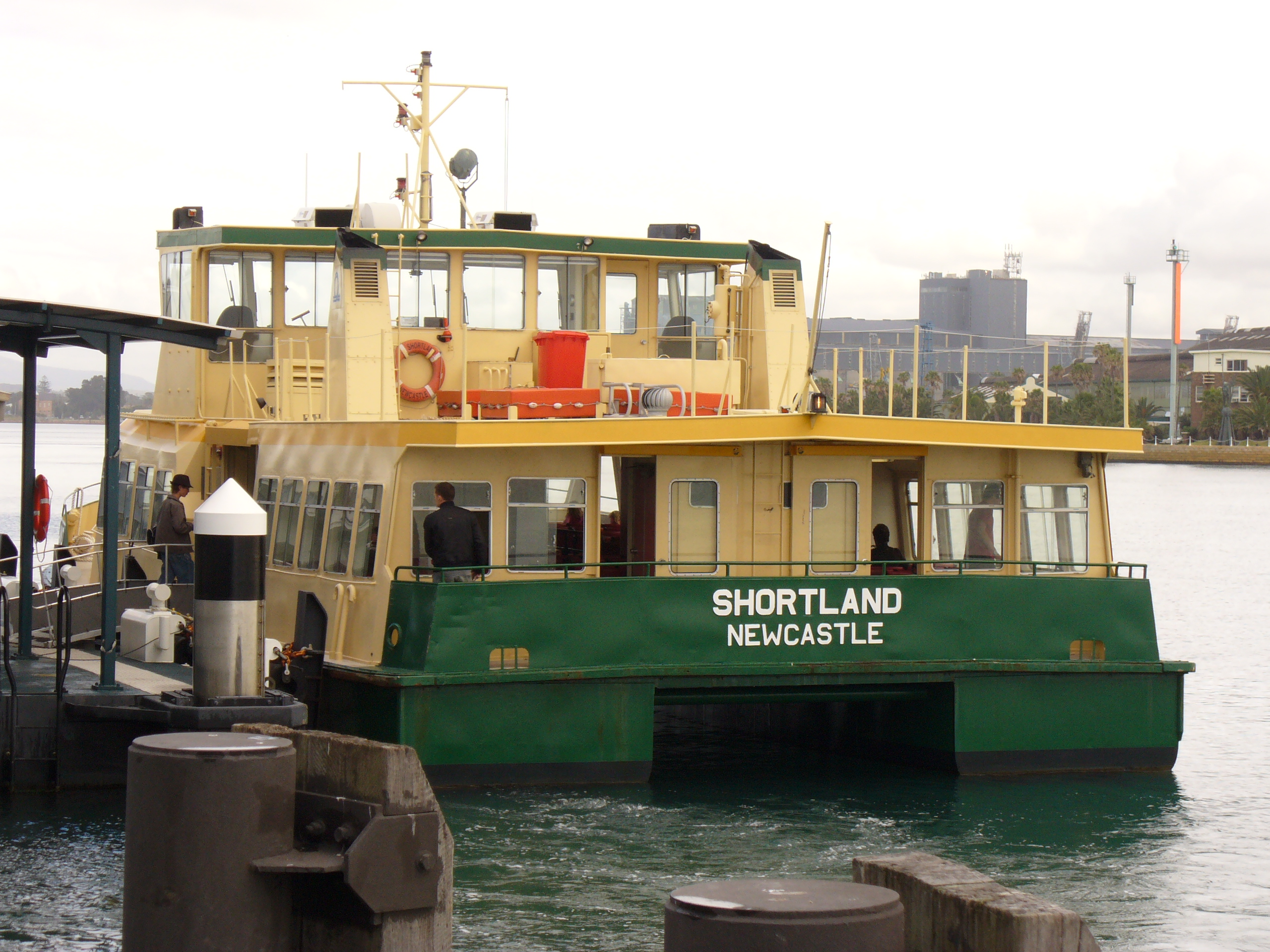
The Stockton Ferry, where several scenes from Blackrock were filmed

Newcastle's Freewheels Theatre commissioned Nick Enright to produce a play that explored themes around the rape and murder. Titled A Property of the Clan, it premiered at the Freewheels Theatre in Newcastle in 1992, and was performed at the National Institute of Dramatic Art in 1993. The title was taken from the controversial quote in the psychological report on Webster made in preparation for his trial. Enright omitted the criminal acts and the murder from the play, instead focusing on the drama, its participants and the aftermath of the murder. The play was shown at various high schools in the Newcastle area, and following its positive reception was shown at high schools nationally, winning several awards. However, Newcastle High School, where both Leigh and Webster had been students, declined to show it. The play is set in the fictional town of Blackrock, and the rape and murder victim is named Tracy. Leigh's family requested that the name be changed, as 'Tracey' was the name of Leigh's cousin and best friend. The name remained, despite other revisions to the script; the play was retitled Blackrock. It was performed by the Sydney Theatre Company in 1995 and 1996.

Blackrock was developed into a film of the same name, which was partially filmed in Stockton and released in 1997. The community of Stockton opposed filming in the area, stating the memories of the events were still fresh and the details of the script were "too close for comfort". When filmmakers arrived in Stockton the local media treated them with hostility, and locations that had previously been reserved were no longer available. The situation was exacerbated by the filmmakers' denial that the film was specifically about Leigh, despite the choice of Stockton for filming. Leigh's family were opposed to the film, saying the filmmakers were "feasting on an unfortunate situation" and portraying Leigh negatively. Associate professor Donna Lee Brien of Central Queensland University stated that some fictional aspects in the film portrayed Leigh in a negative manner, though the book Reel Tracks by Rebecca Doyle credited the film with correcting misinformation reported in the media regarding the murder, as well as with providing a forum for reflection on the events. The film received a mixed-to-positive reception in Australia, but performed poorly when shown elsewhere; Brien stated that because the film lacked the "poignant and powerful narrative support of Leigh's tragedy", it was deemed by critics to be "shallow and clichéd".
