= Mark Riley (journalist) =

Australian journalist

Mark Riley is an Australian journalist. Since 2004 and as of September 2026, he is political editor for Seven News.

== Career ==
Riley started his journalism career in 1979 as a cadet at The Newcastle Herald, where he covered topics including the 1989 Newcastle earthquake and the murder of Leigh Leigh. Riley's extended coverage of Leigh's murder received criticism from the Sydney Law Review and criminologist Kerry Carrington, on the grounds that he was victim blaming Leigh for her own sexual assault and murder.

He later worked for The Sydney Morning Herald, where he covered politics. In 1998, he was appointed the New York correspondent for The Sydney Morning Herald and The Age. Riley provided many reports for both newspapers on the 11 September terrorist attacks.

Returning to Australia in 2002, Riley became The Sydney Morning Herald's chief political correspondent. In this position he provided commentary from Parliament House in Canberra.

In 2004, Riley joined the Seven Network and was appointed political editor for Seven News. His journalistic approach was criticised in 2011, when he was accused of "ambushing" the then Leader of the Opposition Tony Abbott.

As of September 2026 he remains political editor for Seven News.

| Preceded by Glenn Milne | Seven News; Political Editor; 2004–present | Succeeded by Incumbent |

== Recognition and awards ==
Riley jointly won a Walkley Award in 1999 for his part in The Sydney Morning Herald's coverage of East Timor's independence. He also won a Walkley for his articles and opinion pieces in The West Australian.

He won the Paul Lyneham Award for excellence in press gallery journalism, becoming the first first television journalist to do so.
