= Truth in sentencing =

Legal concepts

Truth in sentencing (TIS) is a collection of different but related public policy stances on sentencing of those convicted of crimes in the justice system. In most contexts, it refers to policies and legislation that aim to abolish or curb parole so that convicts serve the period to which they have been sentenced. Truth in sentencing advocates relate such policies in terms of the public's right to know. They argue, for example, that it is deceptive to sentence an individual to "seven to nine years" and then release them after they have served only six years.

In some cases, truth in sentencing is linked to other movements, such as mandatory sentencing (in which particular crimes yield automatic sentences regardless of the extenuating circumstances) and habitual-offender or "three-strikes" laws, in which state law requires the state courts to hand down mandatory and extended periods of incarceration to persons who have been convicted of a criminal offense on multiple occasions.

== Australia ==
In New South Wales, "truth in sentencing" was brought in with the '1989 Sentencing Act'. The term "truth in sentencing", which was commonly used to refer to the legislation, was endorsed by the Australian Law Reform Commission. As the legislation removed inmates receiving time off for good behaviour, it is also said to have removed an important incentive for prisoners to behave, and motivated some to attempt to escape. Alongside behaviour, motivation and work and educational performance from prisoners subsequently deteriorated, as did the rapport between prisoners and officers. Its introduction also resulted in significant overcrowding in NSW prisons during the 1990s.

The first murderer to be sentenced under the legislation was Matthew Webster, who was convicted of the murder of Leigh Leigh. In 1990, Webster received 14 years with an additional six-year parole period; he remained in prison for 14½ years. If he had received a 'life sentence' under the previous legislation, it is likely that he would have only served nine years due to his age.

== Canada ==
In Canada, the Truth in Sentencing act, or Bill C-25 came into effect on Monday, February 22, 2010. This bill amends s.719 of the Criminal Code of Canada, limiting the discretion of a sentencing judges to give credit to individuals who have spent time incarcerated prior to conviction. Until then, as discussed by Justice Arbour in R v. Wust, credit for pre-sentencing custody was not determined by a 'mathematical formula', but many judges frequently granted a two-for-one credit.

That is justified by the quantitative and qualitative differences between pre-and post-sentencing incarceration. Most individuals who are incarcerated will not serve the full length of their sentence, and because time spent incarcerated pre-sentence does not count towards remission time, if a lengthy pre-sentence incarceration is credited equally to post-sentencing incarceration, the convicted individual will serve a longer sentence compared to an individual who is given the same sentence without a lengthy period of pre-sentencing incarceration. Arbour also points out that pre-sentence incarceration is typically served in detention, in harsher circumstances than the sentence will ultimately call for and without access to educational, rehabilitative and vocational programs.

Bill C-25 creates three changes in the Criminal Code; now under s.719(3), generally the maximum credit a judge can give is 1:1. Under s.719(3.1) and 719(3.2) a judge can give a credit of 1.5:1 only "if the circumstances justify it." Under s.719(3.1), the sentencing judge cannot give greater than 1:1 credit if the reason for pre-sentencing incarceration is either that person's criminal record or if that individual has breached bail conditions.

The constitutionality of this bill was challenged under s.7, s.13 and s.15 of The Charter in the Ontario Court of Justice by Marvin Johnson. The court found that the amendment survives Charter scrutiny if the phrase if the circumstances justify it is interpreted in a manner that does not limit the granting of a 1.5:1 credit to such a high standard "that mandates a level of exceptionality that goes well beyond the ordinary experience of "dead time" or the penal disparities that typically flow from such pre-sentence custody." In this case, Johnson, who was sentenced to 18 months for the sale of $20 of cocaine to an undercover officer, was given a 1.5:1 credit for the 12 months that he had spent in pre-sentence custody and was released two days after his sentencing hearing to a one-year period of probation.

== United States ==
The first law requiring truth in sentencing in the United States was passed by Washington State in 1984. In 1994, the Violent Crime Control and Law Enforcement Act created the Violent Offender Incarceration and Truth in Sentencing program, which awarded grants to states so long as they passed laws requiring that offenders convicted of Part 1 violent crimes must serve at least 85% of the sentence for qualifying crimes before becoming eligible for parole. As of 2008, the District of Columbia and 35 of the 50 states qualify for this additional funding.

== See also ==
- Dwight Correctional Center
- Incapacitation (penology)
