= Blackrock (play) =

Play by Nick Enright

- Author: Nick Enright
- Language: English
- Genre: Play
- Publisher: Currency Press
- Publication date: 1996
- Publication place: Australia
- Media type: Print (Paperback)
- ISBN: 978-0-86819-477-6

Blackrock is a play by Australian playwright Nick Enright that was first performed in 1995. It was adapted from a 1992 play by Enright, A Property of the Clan, which was inspired by the murder of Leigh Leigh in Stockton, Australia in 1989. The plays were both well received critically but attracted criticism from both Leigh's family and the media because of the fictionalisation of an actual murder. Despite repeated statements from Enright that the plays were a work of fiction, they have both often been considered by viewers to be a factual account. A Property of the Clan was shortlisted for a New South Wales Premier's Literary Award in 1993, and Blackrock won the AWGIE Award for Best Play in 1996. Blackrock was developed into a feature film of the same name in 1997.

== Plot ==
Blackrock is an Australian beachside working-class suburb (Note: The suburb of Blackrock is fictional and is not to be confused with the similarly-named Melbourne suburb Black Rock, Victoria.) where surfing is popular among youths like Jared. He has his first serious girlfriend, Rachel, who comes from a much wealthier part of the city. One day Ricko, the local surfing legend, returns from an eleven-month trip. Rachel's brother Toby holds his 18th birthday party at the local beach club a few days later, and Jared decides to merge a 'welcome home' party for Ricko with the event. The party is unsupervised, with alcohol freely available. The following morning, it is revealed that 15-year-old Tracy Warner was killed at the party.

Three youths from the party, Davo, Scott, and Toby, tell Ricko that they raped Tracy but left her alive. The three boys are later arrested for the sexual assault. Ricko confesses to Jared that he killed Tracy. He says he was attempting to have sex with her when she bit him and kicked him, so in a moment of rage he grabbed a rock and hit her with it. He has already told police that he was with Jared all night and asks Jared to confirm his alibi in the name of mateship. Jared is torn between telling the truth and protecting his friend. After witnessing Ricko's abusive behaviour towards their friend Tiffany, Jared decides to tell the truth. Ricko is detained by police and hangs himself in his cell.

Jared's silence leads to the breakdown of his relationships with both Rachel and his mother, Diane. In the play's last scene Jared confesses to Diane that he witnessed the three youths raping Tracy, but he did not intervene. He is unsure why he did nothing but he believes it was out of loyalty to the boys who were his mates. Ricko left Jared a suicide note giving him his van, but Jared asks his cousin Cherie to dump the keys to the van in the ocean when she goes out surfing.

== Development ==
=== Origins as A Property of the Clan ===
The play originated as Enright's A Property of the Clan, a theatre-in-education piece written for Freewheels Theatre in Education in Newcastle which premiered in 1992. Enright was approached by the director of Freewheels, Brian Joyce, who suggested the murder of Leigh Leigh as a subject for a play. Enright initially refused, but Joyce argued that the actual subject of the play would be the victim's peer-groups. Enright agreed, after being convinced a play could be made out of the conflicting responses to the crime. The title was taken from a quote in the psychological report that was made on Mathew Webster, the man who murdered Leigh, in preparation for his trial. The first decision regarding the play was to omit the criminal acts and the actual murder from it, instead focusing on the drama, its participants and the aftermath of the murder.

=== Reception of A Property of the Clan ===
Leigh's family, who had found out about the play, attended a private screening of it; some of them had not seen each other for two years. Leigh's mother Robyn objected to the fictionalisation of her daughter's murder, stating she would have preferred a documentary account. The rape and murder victim in A Property of the Clan was named Tracy, which Leigh's family also objected to, as 'Tracey' was the name of Leigh's cousin and best friend. One of Leigh's aunts asked Brian Joyce to change the character's name out of respect for the family, however, the name remain unchanged, even after the play was rewritten and retitled Blackrock. The local media reported on the family objections to the play, and the day after the play opened, Freewheels faced "mounting disapproval", and attempted to distance themselves from Leigh's murder. Both Enright and Freewheels chairperson Sharon McMillan respond to the growing controversy. McMillan wrote in The Newcastle Herald, stating that media coverage of the play was "unfortunately" focusing on Leigh's murder instead of the play's message, also stating that some people reporting on it in this manner had not even watched the play. Enright stated that while the comparison to Leigh's murder was of interest to the media, the play was actually about how any group of boys abuse any girl, and how they came to do it. Nevertheless, many viewers considered the play to be a factual account of the murder. Even though the rape and murder were not shown in the play, the audience were said to be able to fill in their blanks from their knowledge of Leigh's killing.

Despite the controversy, the play was shown at various high-schools in the Newcastle area, and following its positive critical reception, was shown nationally at high schools across the country over a period of eighteen months. However Newcastle High School, where both Leigh and Webster had been students, declined to book the play. The play was also shown at the National Institute of Dramatic Art in 1993, and was shortlisted for a New South Wales Premier's Literary Award that year.

=== Redevelopment as Blackrock ===
In 1994 the Sydney Theatre Company commissioned Enright to develop the original 45-minute play into a full-length production. Blackrock retained the original four characters but also added nine others. It also extended the length of the play, and was considered to be a more fictionalised version of Leigh's murder, though many viewers still considered it to be a factual account of the crime. The narrative and emphasis were reshaped for an adult audience outside of a specifically educational environment, also shifting the plays focus. While A Property of the Clan focused on the possible motives for rape, Blackrock was said to focus on the boys involved in the crime, portraying them as victims of the society they live in.

Blackrock was first performed at Wharf I, a theatre run by the Sydney Theatre Company, on 30 August 1995. It also played at the Australian Theatre Festival in Canberra that same year. Blackrock continued to be performed at the Sydney Theatre Company throughout 1995, and performed a sold-out season at Wharf I in 1996. It has since had many productions throughout Australia, including being performed by a Newcastle-based theatre company, Tantrum Theatre, in 2010. The 2010 version contained a few minor updates, such as referring to surfer Layne Beachley instead of Wendy Botha.

=== Reception of Blackrock ===
John McCallum from The Australian gave a favourable review of the play, also stating that the decision to transform the play from its original educational environment to a mainstream audience was a "bold move" that was "triumphantly successful." Blackrock won an AWGIE Award for Best Play in 1996. When the play was shown in Sydney, Joyce expressed disappointment at how it was misinterpreted as being about Leigh and "that community".

People came up to me after and said "Is it really like that in Newcastle?" ... I was very disheartened because I grew up on the Northern Beaches in Sydney and I didn't see it as any different whatsoever. It was happening 20 years ago when I was young. I remember there was violence, there was rape, there was party rape and there was party rape with alcohol and a lot of violence associated with that.

— Brian Joyce

When interviewed in 1996 while Blackrock was being adapted into a film, Joyce expressed regret that the media continually drawing connections between the play and Leigh's murder had caused additional suffering for Leigh's family, as he had initiated the play with the intention of aiding in the healing process of all the people affected by the murder. Reviewing a version of the play that was performed in 2010, Caroline Wake from RealTime Arts likened the actors performing in the play to several of the initiation ceremonies that occur in the play itself, stating that to perform in Blackrock is to be "initiated into Newcastle’s history, to learn that along with the mines and the beaches, the death of Leigh Leigh too is your ambivalent inheritance."

The New South Wales Department of Education and Communities support website hosted curriculum material for high school classwork on both plays, prior to its decommission in 2016.

== Premiere production ==
Blackrock's premiere production was directed by David Berthold, and featured the following cast:

- Jared: Simon Lyndon
- Cherie: Rebecca Smart
- Ricko: Paul Bishop
- Davo: Dan Wyllie
- Scott: Teo Gebert
- Toby: Joel Edgerton
- Tiffany: Kristina Bidenko
- Stewart/Len/Roy: John Walton
- Marian/Glenys: Julie Godfrey
- Rachel: Kym Wilson
- Diane: Angela Punch McGregor

All other roles were played by members of the company.

== Film adaptation ==
While the revisions to the play Blackrock were still being finalised, Enright started working with first-time director Steven Vidler to produce a film version, which would also be titled Blackrock. Blackrock was released in 1997. Rebecca Smart reprised her role as Cherie in the film. Simon Lyndon who portrayed Jared in the play was cast as Ricko in the film.
