= Doom Runners =

- Written by: Barney Cohen; Ken Lipman
- Directed by: Brendan Maher
- Starring: Tim Curry; Dean O'Gorman; Lea Moreno; Nathan Jones; Bradley Pierce; Rebecca Smart; Paul Livingston; Michael Lake; David Whitney; Peter Carroll; Jon Pollard
- Narrated by: Dean O'Gorman
- Music by: Braedy Neal
- Country of origin: Australia
- Original language: English

Production
- Producer: Posie Graeme-Evans
- Cinematography: Steve Arnold
- Editor: Henry Dangar
- Running time: 90 minutes
- Production company: Millennium Pictures

Original release
- Network: Showtime
- Release: 20 December 1997

Doom Runners (1997) is an Australian science fiction television children's film.

== Cast ==
- Tim Curry as Dr Kao
- Dean O'Gorman as Deek
- Lea Moreno as Jada
- Nathan Jones as Vike
- Bradley Pierce as Adam
- Rebecca Smart as Lizzie
- Peter Carroll as William
- David Whitney as Thorne
- Putu Winchester as Danny
- Paul Livingston as Caesar Lopez
- Jon Pollard as Rule
- Ken Goodlet as Resistance Fighter
- Michael Lake as Endgame Man
- Justin Rosniak as Kid

== Premise ==
The story concerns a group of children in a post-apocalyptic world searching for the last unpolluted place on Earth, New Eden. However, the Doom Troopers (DTs), led by Dr. Kao (Tim Curry), want to get there first and will do anything to stop the children. Prior to the film's release, Curry noted that the production resembled a "'Mad Max' for kids."

== Telecast premiere ==
Produced in cooperation between America's Paramount-owned Showtime and Nickelodeon, the film was telecast on Showtime starting 20 December 1997. Later the next year, it was telecast on Nickelodeon in the US from 25 April 1998, the first original full-length feature film to air on that network.
