= Simon Lyndon =

Australian actor and director

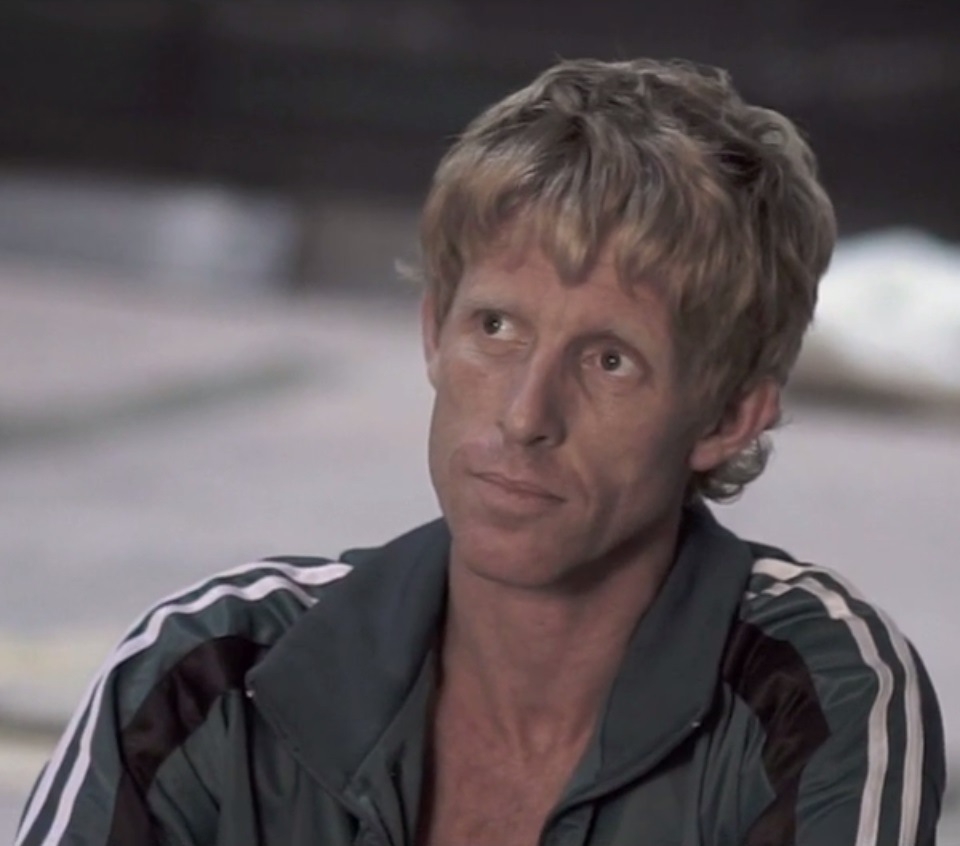
- Born: Lewisham, England
- Education: Western Australian Academy of Performing Arts
- Occupations: Actor, director

Simon Lyndon (born 1971) is an Australian actor and director.

== Early life and education ==
Simon Lyndon was born in Lewisham, London in 1971 and migrated to Australia with his family in 1981. He grew up in Fremantle, Western Australia. Simon attended John Curtin College of the Arts in the Theatre Arts program and later graduated from the Western Australian Academy of Performing Arts in Perth.

== Career ==
=== Film roles ===
Lyndon received an Australian Film Institute Award (AFI) nomination for Best Supporting Actor for the 1997 drama Blackrock.

He played Jimmy Loughnan in Chopper (2000) with Eric Bana, for which he won an AFI Award for Best Supporting Actor, and a Film Critics Circle of Australia Award for Best Supporting Actor.

He won Best Actor in a Telefeature or Mini-series for his role as Jack Meredith in the 2001 telemovie My Brother Jack.

Other films include Fresh Air, Sample People, The Thin Red Line, From the Outside, Caught Inside, Falling in the Paradise, The Glenmore Job, The Well and Dust off the Wings

=== Television roles ===
Lyndon's TV appearances include Police Rescue, Heartbreak High, Wildside, Underbelly and Canal Road.

He also appeared in FOX network show Roar in 1997 as a tribe leader named Colm. The lead role of Connor Der Kilte was played by fellow Australian and Lyndon's former Blackrock co-star Heath Ledger.

In 2011 he played a younger Jack Thompson in Paper Giants: The Birth of Cleo on ABC 1. He played the miner who died, Larry Knight, in the TV film Beaconsfield about the 2006 mine disaster. Also in 2011 Simon appeared in the second series of Spirited, on Foxtel, playing a ghost known as 'The King' or Darren Bonney, who lives in an apartment with a dentist (Claudia Karvan), who is in love with another ghost resident.

Simon played Tintagel Stone in an episode of Miss Fisher's Murder Mysteries in 2012. He also appeared in TV series Puberty Blues as a surfing teacher Gumby that same year.

He appeared as Emilio the truck business owner in season 2 of Mystery Road (episodes 1–3). He also played the unfortunate Hedwig's father Michael in the 2021 Netflix series Eden, and Twist in the 2022 ABC TV series Troppo.

=== Stage roles ===
In 2013 Lyndon was in a four-person play called Anaconda by Sarah Doyle, with Tamarama Rock Surfers at Bondi Pavilion. He has also directed a Tamarama Rock Surfers production of Road, featuring among others Bojana Novakovic, Jeremy Cumpston, Zena Cumpston and Angie Milliken, as well as a Tamarama Rock Surfers production of Diary of a Madman starring Alan Morris.

In June/July 2017 Lyndon appeared in Sunset Strip, a four-person play by Suzie Miller, performed by Stables Theatre Company at Griffin Theatre in Darlinghurst. He reprised this role in a tour around Australia by the same company in 2019.

He has also appeared on stage in That Eye the Sky, Blackrock (in a different role to which he played in the film version), Cloudstreet and Popcorn.

== Filmography ==
=== Film ===
Year	Title	Role	Type
1995	Sidewinder – Titanic Days	Rick	Short film
1997	Blackrock	Brett 'Ricko' Ricketson	Feature film
1997	The Well	Abel	Feature film
1997	Dust Off the Wings	Gazza	Feature film
1998	Bloodlock	Reffo	Short film
1998	The Thin Red Line	Medic #2	Feature film
1999	Fresh Air	Harrison	Feature film
2000	Sample People	Andy	Feature film
2000	Chopper	Jimmy Loughnan	Feature film
2000	Dogwoman: A Grrrl's Best Friend	Matt Heyduke	TV movie
2001	My Brother Jack	Jack Meredith	TV movie
2004	Falling in the Paradise (aka Pad u raj)	Jonathan Schumacher	Feature film
2005	The Glenmoore Job	Warren	TV movie
2005	Best and Fairest	Jake	Short film
2006	Stalled	Rob	Short film
2006	Guy in a Field	Guy	Short film
2006	Warhead		Short film
2007	Shotgun! (An Opening Sequence)	Steve	Short film
2007	BlackJack: Ghosts	Johnny Vale	TV movie
2008	Valentine's Day	Bean	TV movie
2009	The Last Supper	Andrew	Short film
2009	Hunted	Bud	Short film
2009	Facing Rupert	Steve Swanson	Short film
2010	Caught Inside	Toobs	Feature film
2012	Loaded	Lee	Short film
2012	Beaconsfield	Larry Knight	TV movie
2013	Thanks for the Ride	Oliver	Short film
2015	Colt 13	Simmo	Short film
2015	Pedal	Cannon	Short film
2017	Concealed	Max	Feature film
2017	Foreign Body	Adam	Short film
2017	Red Handed	Stalker	Short film
2020	Necktie	David	Short film
2020	Chucky Boy Blue	Chucky	Short film
2022	Maddie's Red Hot	Dylan	Short film
	From the Outside		

2024 Just a Farmer Policeman and directed the film.

=== Television ===
Year	Title	Role	Type
1995	Soldier Soldier	Fusilier Michael Vickers	TV series, 1 episode
1996	Police Rescue	Matt	TV series, 1 episode
1997	Heartbreak High	JJ	TV series, 2 episodes
1997	Roar	Colm	TV series, 1 episode
1998	Wildside	John 'Scratch' Scratchley	TV series, 2 episodes
2000	All Saints	Will Harrington	TV series, 1 episode
2001	Water Rats	Kevin O'Shea	TV series, 1 episode
1999 / 2001	Stingers	Ben Matthews / Hickock	TV series, 2 episodes
2007	City Homicide	Josh Braddock	TV series, 1 episode
2008	Underbelly	Sean Sonnet	TV series, 3 episodes
2008	Canal Road	Daryl King	TV miniseries, 3 episodes
2008	Rush	Snuffy Wells	TV series, 1 episode
2010	Cops L.A.C.	Cameron	TV series, 1 episode
2011	Paper Giants: The Birth of Cleo	Jack Thompson	TV miniseries, 2 episodes
2011	Wild Boys	Hogan	TV series, 1 episode
2011	Spirited	'The King' / Darren Bonney	TV series, season 2, 10 episodes
2012	Miss Fisher's Murder Mysteries	Tintagel Stone	TV series, season 1, episode 3: "The Green Mill Murder"
2012	Puberty Blues	Gumby	TV series, 3 episodes
2015	Deadline Gallipoli	Conrad White	TV miniseries, 1 episode
2019	Mr Inbetween	Pidgy	TV series, 1 episode
2020	Mystery Road	Emilio Gordon	TV series, season 2, episodes 1–3
2021	Eden	Michael	TV series, 3 episodes
2022–24	Troppo	Twist	TV series, 9 episodes
2025	Return to Paradise	Jimmy Clyborne	TV series, season 2, episode 2

== Theatre ==
=== As actor ===
Year	Title	Role	Venue / Co.
1994	Thark		Western Australian Academy of Performing Arts
1995	That Eye, The Sky		Playhouse Perth, Space Theatre, Adelaide
1995	Blackrock	Jared	Wharf 1 Theatre with Sydney Theatre Company, Canberra Theatre
1996	Live Acts on Stage		Stables Theatre
1998	Cloudstreet		Berth 9, Darling Harbour
2007	The Birthday Party		FAD Gallery, Melbourne, St Kilda Army and Navy Club Memorial Hall
2013	Anaconda		Bondi Pavilion with Tamarama Rock Surfers
2017, 2019	Sunset Strip		Stables Theatre Company at Griffin Theatre & Australia tour
	Popcorn		

=== As director ===
Year	Title	Role	Venue / Co.
	Road	Director	Tamarama Rock Surfers
	Diary of a Madman	Director	Tamarama Rock Surfers
