= Eggshells (TV series) =

- Genre: Sitcom
- Written by: Geoffrey Atherden
- Directed by: Geoff Portmann
- Starring: Garry McDonald; Judy Morris
- Composer: Phillip Scott
- Country of origin: Australia
- Original language: English
- No. of episodes: 15

Production
- Running time: 30 minutes

Original release
- Network: ABC
- Release: 11 February 1991 – 4 September 1993

Eggshells is an Australian sitcom about a divorced man. It aired on ABC TV from 1991 to 1993 and ran for two seasons and 15 episodes.

Its first season premiered on 11 February 1991, and it returned for a second season on 17 July 1993.

== Cast ==
- Garry McDonald as Frank Rose
- Judy Morris as Kathy Rose
- Susan Lyons as Jill Knight
- Christine Amor as Vanessa
- Rebecca Smart as Zoe Rose
- Ben Unwin as Andrew
- Justin Rosniak as Jake Rose
- Anna Maria Monticelli

- Steve Bisley as Lester
