= Rebecca Smart =

Australian actor

- Born: Rebecca Elizabeth Smart; 30 January 1976 (age 50); Tamworth, New South Wales, Australia
- Occupation: Actor
- Years active: 1984–present
- Known for: The Shiralee (1987); Elly & Jools (1990); Heartbreak High (1997–1998); Water Rats (2000–2001)
- Website: leeleslie.com/artist/rebecca-smart

Rebecca Elizabeth Smart (born 30 January 1976) is an Australian actor, known for her role in the 1987 television film The Shiralee.

== Early life and education ==
Smart was born in Tamworth, New South Wales on 30 January 1976. She was educated at St Catherine's School, Waverley, an independent, Anglican, day and boarding school for girls, located in the eastern suburbs of Sydney.

== Career ==
Smart began acting for television at the age of eight, appearing in the 1984 miniseries The Cowra Breakout as Shirley Murphy. Her first movie role came one year later, alongside Eric Roberts and Greta Scacchi in the 1985 romantic comedy The Coca-Cola Kid.

She gained recognition playing the co-lead role as Buster (opposite Bryan Brown), in the 1987 television film The Shiralee, based on the 1955 novel of the same name. The role won her the Silver Logie Award for Most Popular Actress in a Miniseries/Telemovie. She also played the title character in the 1988 horror drama film Celia.

Smart went on to feature in regular roles in several television series, including playing Eleanor "Elly" Lockett in 1990 children's series Elly & Jools, Zoe Rose in 1991 sitcom Eggshells, student Melanie Black in high school drama Heartbreak High (1997–1998), and Constable Donna Janevski in police procedural crime drama Water Rats (2000–2001). She also featured in several miniseries including Spit MacPhee (1988), Come in Spinner (1990) and Clowning Around (1991)

She has had guest roles in numerous series including Winners (1985), The Comedy Company (1989), Rafferty's Rules (1989), More Winners (1990), English at Work (1992), G.P. (1994), Home and Away (1996), House Gang (1996), Murder Call (1998), All Saints (1999) and Blue Heelers (2004).

Smart starred in the 1997 thriller Blackrock, alongside Heath Ledger, which saw her nominated for Best Supporting Actor at both the Film Critics Circle of Australia and Australian Film Institute Awards.

Her other film credits include Echoes of Paradise (1987), Say a Little Prayer (1993), Violet's Visit (1997), Tom's Funeral (1999), Savages Crossing (2011) and Skin Deep (2014). She also featured in the made-for-TV films Doom Runners (1997) and Corn Devils (1998).

Smart has also acted for the stage, her credits including The Crucible, Blackrock, and Del Del for Sydney Theatre Company and Hollow Ground for NIDA / Belvoir St Theatre.

== Personal life ==
Smart started studying a Bachelor of Education degree at University of Sydney in her early 20s, when acting opportunities weren't as forthcoming.

== Awards and nominations ==
Year	Award	Category	Work	Result
1987	Logie Awards	Most Popular Actress in a Miniseries/Telemovie	The Shiralee	Won
1997	Australian Film Institute Awards	Best Supporting Actress	Blackrock	Nominated
1997	Film Critics Circle of Australia Awards	Best Supporting Actress	Blackrock	Nominated

== Filmography ==
=== Film ===
Year	Title	Role	Type
1985	The Coca-Cola Kid	DMZ	Feature film
1985	The Empty Beach	Little Girl	Feature film
1987	Echoes of Paradise (aka Shadow of the Peacock)	Tessa	Feature film
1989	Celia	Celia Carmichael	Feature film
1993	Say a Little Prayer	Lynne	Feature film
1997	Blackrock	Cherie Milenko	Feature film
1997	Violet's Visit	Scooter	Feature film
1999	Tom's Funeral	Rebecca	Feature film
2004	Industrial Love Dwarf Number 7	Friend	Film short
2005	Oedipus	Mother	Film short
2011	Savages Crossing	Mickey	Feature film
2014	Skin Deep	Nina	Feature film
2016	Highway	Marlene	Film short

=== Television ===
Year	Title	Role	Notes
1984	The Cowra Breakout	Shirley Murphy	Miniseries, 4 episodes
1985	Winners	Jennie Nelson	Anthology series, 1 episode: "Top Kid"
1987	The Shiralee	Buster	Miniseries, 2 episodes
1988	Spit MacPhee (aka The True Story of Spit MacPhee)	Sadie Tree	Miniseries, 4 episodes
1989	The Comedy Company	Herself	1 episode
1989	Rafferty's Rules	Jackie Rogan	1 episode
1990	Elly & Jools	Eleanor 'Elly' Lockett	
1990	Come in Spinner	Luen	Miniseries, 2 episodes
1990	More Winners: Mr Edmund	Cherry	Anthology series, 1 episode: "Mr Edmund"
1991	Eggshells	Zoe Rose	13 episodes
1992	Clowning Around	Linda Crealy	Miniseries, 2 episodes
1992	English at Work	Herself	1 episode: "Assurance of Support"
1994	G.P.	Cassandra 'Caz' Koffel	1 episode: "Sugar & Spice"
1996	Home and Away		TV series
1996	House Gang	V.J.	2 episodes: "Sex", "Truth or Dare"
1997	Doom Runners	Lizzie	TV film
1997–1998	Heartbreak High	Melanie Black	42 episodes
1998	Corn Devils	Becky	TV film
1998	Murder Call	Claudine Kent	1 episode: "Fatal Charm"
1999	All Saints	Charlotte 'Charlie' Wilde	1 episode: "Outside the Square"
2000–2001	Water Rats	Constable Donna Janevski	60 episodes
2004	Blue Heelers	Amy Rose	Season 12, 1 episode: "Secrets & Lies"

== Theatre ==
Year	Title	Role	Type
1994	The Crucible	Susanna Walcott	Monash University, Melbourne, Riverside Theatres Parramatta, His Majesty's Theatre, Perth
1995	Blackrock	Cherie	Wharf Theatre, Sydney with STC
1998	Del Del	Beth	Glen St Theatre, Sydney with STC
2000	Hollow Ground	Shelley	Belvoir St Theatre with NIDA
2000	Beyond the Door		Tunks Productions
