= Spit MacPhee =

- Genre: Mini-series
- Based on: The True Story of Spit MacPhee by James Aldridge
- Written by: Moya Wood
- Directed by: Marcus Cole
- Starring: John Mills; Phillip Hancock
- Country of origin: Australia
- Original language: English
- No. of episodes: 4

Production
- Producer: Noel Price
- Running time: 4 x 1 hours

Original release
- Network: Nine Network
- Release: 10 May – 13 May 1988

Spit MacPhee is a 1988 Australian mini-series set in the 1930s. It is based on the novel by James Aldridge. Also known as The True Story of Spit MacPhee it stars Phillip Hancock as Spit and John Mills as his grandfather.

Bob Hudson, writing in the Sydney Morning Herald, concludes "(Spit Macphee is a fine family story — a realistic tale that will draw you in from the first moment you see young Spit, hooting like a klaxon, leap into his beloved Murray River." The Age's Barbara Hooks called it "a warm, wise and highly entertaining drama that also speaks with intelligence and eloquence about a universal and timeless theme — relationships between adults and children and the motive that enrich or doom them."

== Cast ==
- John Mills as Fyfe MacPhee
- Phillip Hancock as Spit MacPhee
- Elspeth Ballantyne as Grace Tree
- Rebecca Smart as Sadie Tree
- John Bach as Jack Tree
- Linda Cropper as Betty Arbuckle
- Ray Meagher as Frank Arbuckle
- Marion Edward as Sister Campbell
