= The Australian Feminist Law Journal =

Australian Feminist Law Journal
- Discipline: Law review
- Language: English
- Edited by: Judith Grbich

Publication details
- History: 1999-present
- Publisher: Routledge
- Frequency: Biannual

Standard abbreviations
- ISO 4: Aust. Fem. Law J.

Indexing
- ISSN: 1320-0968
- LCCN: 2009267009
- OCLC no.: 60615973

Links
- Journal homepage; Online access; Online archive

The Australian Feminist Law Journal is a biannual peer-reviewed academic journal covering feminist legal issues from a critical perspective. It was established in 1993 and is published by Routledge.
