= Sydney Law Review =

- Discipline: Law
- Language: English

Publication details
- History: 1953–present
- Publisher: Sydney Law School (Australia)
- Frequency: Quarterly
- Open access: Yes

Standard abbreviations
- Bluebook: Sydney L. Rev.
- ISO 4: Syd. Law Rev.

Indexing
- ISSN: 0082-0512 (print); 1444-9528 (web)

Links
- Journal homepage; Advance content

The Sydney Law Review is a peer-reviewed generalist law journal established in 1953 and published by the Sydney Law School. The Review features original peer-reviewed articles, the 'Before the High Court' column, and review essays and book reviews commissioned by the Editorial Board. Students enrolled in the Sydney Law Review unit of study have the opportunity to publish case notes and law reform comments in the journal.
