= Kerry Carrington =

Australian criminologist and researcher

Kerry Lyn Carrington FASSA (born 1962) is an Australian criminologist, and an adjunct professor at the School of Law and Society at the University of the Sunshine Coast (USC). She formerly served as head of the QUT School of Justice for 11 years from 2009 to 2021. She was editor-in-chief of the International Journal for Crime, Justice and Social Democracy. She is known for her work on gender and violence, feminist criminology, southern criminology, youth justice and girls' violence, and global justice and human rights.

Carrington earned her PhD in sociology at Macquarie University in 1985. She received the Distinguished Scholar Award of the American Society of Criminology in 2014. Her publication Resource Boom Underbelly: The criminological impact of mining won the 2012 Allen Austin Bartholomew Award. She co-edited the Palgrave Handbook in Criminology and the Global South (2018).

Carrington is a Fellow of the Academy of the Social Sciences in Australia, and was the vice chair of the Division of Critical Criminology of the American Society of Criminology until 2019, and a member of the editorial boards of Feminist Criminology, Critical Criminology Journal of Criminology, Current Issues in Criminal Justice, Delito y Sociedad (Crime and Society), Asian Journal of Criminology; Revista Latinoamericana de Sociología and Criminology & Criminal Justice.

As of 2022, Carrington is the Director of Carrington Research Consultancy.

== Books ==
- Southern Criminology (Routledge, 2019)
- The Palgrave Handbook of Criminology and the Global South (ed., Palgrave Macmillan, 2018)
- Feminism and Global Justice (Routledge, 2014)
- Offending Youth: Crime, Sex and Justice (Federation Press, 2009)
- Policing the Rural Crisis (Federation Press, 2006)
- Who Killed Leigh Leigh? (Random House, 1998)
- Offending Girls: Sex, Youth and Justice (Allen & Unwin, 1993)

== Honours ==
- Fellow of the Academy of the Social Sciences in Australia, 2016
- American Society of Criminology, Lifetime Achievement Award (Division of Critical Criminology)
- American Society of Criminology, Distinguished Scholar Award (Division of Women and Crime)
