= Hugo Chiarella =

Australian writer and actor

Hugo Chiarella is an Australian writer and actor best known for his work in musical theatre.

== Early life and education ==
Chiarella grew up in Sydney, and trained in musical theatre at the Victorian College of the Arts (VCA) in Melbourne.

== Writing ==
=== DreamSong ===
While at university at the VCA, Chiarella began collaborating with fellow student, Robert Tripolino, on the musical DreamSong. He wrote the book and lyrics and Tripolino composed the music. DreamSong is a musical satire about an evangelical megachurch that stages the second coming of Christ and markets him as a Christian pop star. Meanwhile, the actual second coming of Christ occurs.

The VCA agreed to support the development of the musical and staged a full production in 2011 directed by Michael Gurr. The show was selected as part of the Carnegie 19 New Music Theatre programme at Arts Centre Melbourne, where the show went through a workshop followed by a four-night showcase featuring John O'May, Sheridan Harbridge, Nick Christo, Sam Ludeman, Stefanie Jones, Nelson Gardner, Briallen Clarke, and Simon Wilton, once again directed by Gurr.

DreamSong then received a full production at Theatre Works in 2014 directed by Dean Bryant and starring Ben Prendergast, Chelsea Gibb, Brent Hill, Connor Crawford, Emily Langridge, Mike McLeish, Alana Tranter, and Evan Lever, as part of the Melbourne International Comedy Festival. Despite its controversial subject matter, the show received mostly positive reviews. Cameron Woodhead wrote in The Age, "Viable new musicals don't come along every day. Dreamsong isn't perfect, but this satire on the far-right Christian lobby has more hits than misses... Music and action are seamlessly intertwined, and Dreamsong has an engaging storyline, brought to life with dynamic acting, vocals and choreography. The humour can be bleak (there are songs picketing gay funerals and abortion clinics), but the acid satire works well against the natural comic brio of Hill's shambolic, scaredy-cat Jesus".

DreamSong was revived in 2019 by EbbFlow Theatre Company in Melbourne with a production directed by Lauren McKenna at The Alex Theatre, St Kilda, featuring Nelson Gardner, Annie Aitken, Olivia Charalambous, Nicola Bowman, Maxwell Simon, Bailey Dunnage, Kate Schmidli, Samuel Skuthorp, Luisa Scrofani, and Tayla Muir. The production featured musical direction by Maverick Newman and choreography by Maddison Lee.

=== Guilty Pleasures ===
In 2014 Chiarella and Tripolino collaborated with writer Josh Robson to provide songs for the one-woman musical Guilty Pleasures. The show featured lyrics by Chiarella, music by Robert Tripolino and a book by Josh Robson. Guilty Pleasures was written as a vehicle for performer Angelique Cassimatis. It tells the story of five ordinary people driven to acts of extraordinary violence. The show explores how love, passion, jealousy, loneliness and desperation can lead us far beyond what we would ever imagine ourselves to be capable of.

The show premiered at Chapel Off Chapel in Melbourne, before touring to the Brisbane Powerhouse and Hayes Theatre, Sydney, the following year.

The show received positive reviews, particularly for its songs and the central performance from Cassimatis. Coral Drouyn wrote in Stage Whispers, "Then there is the music – excellent songs by Tripolino and Chiarella. It is surely only a matter of time before these great composers reach the giddy heights of Broadway. With every outing their songs grow more sophisticated, both musically through Tripolino, and with the clever and witty lyrics of Chiarella... One can't help but be reminded of a young Sondheim in these offerings... There's an edge of Sweeney Todd in the blackness of it all..."

The show was revived in 2019 for a return season at Chapel Off Chapel, with Cassimatis once again performing.

=== Evie May ===
In 2016 Chiarella began collaborating with composer Naomi Livingston on the musical, Evie May.

Evie May is set in 1966, on the evening of the last ever Tivoli performance in Sydney. The show follows veteran variety star Evie May as she recalls the events that lead her from obscurity in regional Western Australia to the bright lights of the Australian variety circuit and the many sacrifices she made to get there.

Chiarella and Livingston began collaborating on the show while they were touring in the Australian cast of Les Miserables. In 2016, the show was picked up for development by New Musicals Australia and secured a season at the Hayes Theatre in Sydney in 2018 with the support of the Australia Council for the Arts.

The show was directed by Kate Champion, with musical direction and orchestration by Steven Kreamer, musical supervision by Max Lambert, design by Anna Gardiner, lighting design by Sian James-Holland and sound design by Nate Edmondson. The cast featured Amanda Harrison, Loren Hunter, Keegan Joyce, Tim Draxl, Jo Turner and Bishanyia Vincent.

Critic, Diana Simmonds wrote of the show, "Evie May is rude, funny, sad and humane in its portrayal of lives and times now gone; yet when it comes to women’s place in the world, there’s much that’s familiar. And in a musical setting, with sharp, smart lyrics, the poignancy and politics are heightened and vividly coloured. This is a remarkable addition to Australian musical theatre". Judith Greenaway wrote for ArtsHub, "Evie May ends in a bareness of space, an echo chamber of those limited choices that empowered a modern movement. This is an entertaining, crafted, timely and relevant work." In his review for Stage Whispers, Peter Gotting wrote, "When the lights go up on this new Australian musical, there’s a sense of maturity - Sydney’s Hayes Theatre is now producing premieres of variety and accomplishment rarely seen in this country before."

The show was nominated for a Glugs Award for Most Outstanding New Australian Performed Work and Tim Draxl also received a nomination for best supporting actor in a musical. Loren Hunter and Bishanyia Vincent were also nominated for Sydney Theatre Awards for best performance by a female actor in a musical and best supporting performance by a female actor in a musical for their work in the show.

In 2019 a live cast recording of the show was released featuring the original cast.

== Performing ==
Between 2005 and 2007, Chiarella performed in the role of Mendel in the Australasian tour of Fiddler on the Roof with Chaim Topol. Upon graduating drama school in 2011, he appeared as Digby Dash in three seasons of the Australian children's TV series Surprises!. He was also a writer, performer and founding member of the Australian sketch comedy group, 'I'm With Stupid' featuring Matthew Backer, Briallen Clarke, Paige Gardner, Tim Reuben and Gabrielle Scawthorn. The group began producing online sketches in 2013 before being selected to produce sketches for the ABC TV/Screen Australia comedy initiative Fresh Blood. Their sketches were broadcast on ABC2 and ABC iView in 2014.

In 2014 he was cast in the Australian production of Les Misérables. In 2016 he then went on to perform the role of Grantaire in the international tour of Les Misérables performing in Manila, Singapore and Dubai for the opening of the Dubai Opera House. Following this he was cast as Grantaire in the 2017/18 West End cast at the Queens Theatre, London.

== Other work ==
Between 2018 and 2020 Chiarella worked as the development producer for UK theatre company, Fuel. He has also produced new work independently under the company name Unlikely Productions. In 2020 Unlikely Productions produced 'The Apologists' with the support of Arts Council England.

In 2020, Chiarella returned to Les Misérables, this time taking over as the resident director on the UK tour. In 2021, Chiarella commenced work as resident director on the West End production of The Phantom of the Opera.

== Awards and nominations ==
Year	Award	Category	Nominee	Result
2018	Glugs Awards	Most Outstanding New Australian Performed Work	Evie May by Hugo Chiarella and Naomi Livingston	Nominated
2021	APRA Professional Development Award	Music Theatre	Evie May by Hugo Chiarella and Naomi Livingston	Nominated
2021	APRA Professional Development Award	Music Theatre	Paradise Road by Hugo Chiarella and Naomi Livingston	Won

== Personal life ==
Chiarella is married to actor and writer, Gabrielle Scawthorn.
