= Geoff Paine =

Australian television and theatre actor (born 1965)

- Born: 8 August 1965 (age 61); Australia
- Education: Victorian College of the Arts (1983–1985)
- Occupation: Actor
- Years active: 1986–present
- Known for: Neighbours; Pig's Breakfast; Mal.com
- Children: 2

Geoff Paine is an Australian television and theatre actor from Melbourne. After graduating from drama school Paine secured a role on the soap opera Neighbours, playing the role of doctor Clive Gibbons. He remained in the role for one year before leaving to pursue other projects. He returned to the role briefly in 1989, with the opportunity to appear in a spin-off series based on the character, but no television network would produce the show. Paine continued his career with roles in A Country Practice and the comedy sketch show The Comedy Company. He also concentrated on his stage career gaining roles in productions that toured Australia, including various projects at the Melbourne International Comedy Festival.

He continued to appear on television with numerous guest roles in dramas. He later started his own production company, then wrote and starred in his own play, Unpack This, which was based on his own experiences. Other regular roles include his appearances as Malcolm Wilson in the Nine Network children's television series Pig's Breakfast and as Malcom Mann in ABC3's Mal.com. In 2017, Paine decided to return to Neighbours as Clive and continued to appear on a recurring basis until the show’s ending in 2022.

== Early life ==
Paine studied drama at Victorian College of the Arts (VCA) for three years from 1983 to 1985. Directly following his studies, he was approached by the Neighbours casting department to audition for the series, after they watched him perform in a play at the Victorian Arts Centre.

== Career ==
=== Television ===
In 1986, Paine secured the role of Clive Gibbons in the Australian soap opera Neighbours. This was his first television acting role after he had graduated.

In November 1986, TV Week reported that Paine had quit the series but would remain on-screen until early 1987. In a 1988 interview, Paine stated that he feared he would become typecast in the role and did not regret leaving. The actor later made a brief return to the show in 1989. Clive became popular with viewers and this return was scripted to set up a spin-off series, City Hospital. A pilot was made, but it was not picked up by any television networks. Paine moved to London briefly before returning to live in Australia. Neighbours had achieved success in the United Kingdom and he was often approached by fans in the street.

He went on to appear in episodes of the Seven Network soap opera A Country Practice as Jeff Ryan from 1987 to 1989. Paine began appearing in the sketch show The Comedy Company when it returned for its 1990 season. In 1996, Paine secured the guest role of Roman in Blue Heelers. He found the role "interesting" because Roman "is not what he seems." On 13 November 1997, he appeared in an episode of State Coroner as a farmer, Barry Davis who is murdered. In 1999, Paine secured the role of newsreader Malcolm Wilson in the Nine Network children's television series Pig's Breakfast. He reprised the role for the show's second series.

Other acting credits include guest roles in The Games, The Adventures of Lano and Woodley, Stingers, The Wedge, City Homicide, Wilfred and The Doctor Blake Mysteries. Paine's film roles include The Craic (1999), The Wog Boy (2000) and The Wedding Party (2010).

In early 2011, Paine took the role of Malcom Mann in Mal.com. The show was created for a young audience and Malcom is a television host who is also secretly a robot. The show debuted via ABC3 on 28 October 2011. In 2013, he secured a presenting role on Spontaneous Saturday which featured theatresport-type games. The two episode pilot was produced for the SBS network.

In 2017, Paine reprised his role of Clive in Neighbours, twenty-eight years after he had last been on the show. Paine's return came after he made an enquiry to the Neighbours production team via his agent. He had been asked to return previously, but was unable to because of family and other work commitments. Paine remained with Neighbours on a recurring basis, filming episodic blocks while also working in a university. The role saw him working with Colette Mann, with who he had previously co-starred in theatre work. Paine also secured a guest role in an episode of Nine Network's Bad Mothers.

=== Theatre ===
Aside from television roles, Paine has also had a career in theatre, securing roles in various national productions. In 1987, he played Michael in The Hope at the Victorian Arts Centre. In 1991, Paine appeared in the stage version of Hair at the Melbourne Athenaeum. He went on to secure a main role in the 1992 Australian tour of Up 'n' Under. In 1993, Paine secured the role of Terry Legge in the production of Big Toys which was held at the Playbox Theatre, Melbourne. That year Paine was appearing in the theatrical comedy titled "Shear Madness", alongside Colette Mann. In April 1996, he played Marlowe in Murder to Die For, which was produced as part of the Melbourne International Comedy Festival. In May 1997, Paine joined his former Neighbours colleague Annie Jones in the production of Effie – Exposed.

In April 2000, Paine starred in the stage production of The Linda Blair Witch Project at the Melbourne Town Hall. He then appeared in theatre production of It's a Dad Thing! for its Australian tour. In 2011, he wrote and acted a play show titled Unpack This, which debuted at the Melbourne Fringe Festival. The show was based on Paine's own experience attending a one day anger management work shop following a dispute with a neighbour. His show then went on tour around Victoria. In 2019, Paine and Mann worked together again creating their own improvisational show Mann Up and Take the Paine. The show, which also served as an acting class, played during the Melbourne International Comedy Festival.

=== Other work ===
Outside of acting, Paine has worked as a content curator and blogger at Monash University since 2016. Other jobs include time as a consultant for ABC and the Seven Network. He also created his own independent production company producing corporate communications for retail, government and non-profit organisations. Paine is the Councillor for Wingrove Ward in the Nillumbik Council and is currently serving the 2020-2024 term.

== Personal life ==
Paine is the youngest of six children. Paine is the father of twins.

== Filmography ==
=== Film ===
Year	Title	Role	Notes
1997	Kangaroo Palace	Keith	TV movie
1999	The Craic	Russell	Feature film
2000	The Wog Boy	Nick	Feature film
2006	Wil	Dr. Fleiglebaum	Film
2010	The Wedding Party	Colin	Feature film
2010	Pisces, Arise!	Eddie	Short film
2011	Remake	Steve	Short film
2012	The Anti-Social Network	Sarge	Short film

=== Television ===
Year	Title	Role	Notes
1986–1987, 1989, 2017–2022	Neighbours	Clive Gibbons	Regular role; 336 episodes
1987	In Between	Uncredited	Guest role
1987	The D-Generation	Various	Guest role
1987–1989	A Country Practice	Jeff Ryan	Recurring role
1988	The Gerry Connolly Show	Queen's Aide / Surgeon	Guest role
1989	Acropolis Now	Jason Felfy	Guest role
1989	The Flying Doctors	Steve Patterson	Guest role
1989	Mission: Impossible	Michael Skelton	Guest role
1990	The Comedy Company	Various	Regular role
1993	Snowy	Geoff Williams	Guest role
1994	Blue Heelers	Arthur Lock	Guest role
1994	Breaking News	Mike Moore Impersonator	Guest role
1994	A Country Practice	Robbie McIntyre	Guest role
1994	Sky Trackers	Space Camp Counsellor #2	Guest role
1995	Halifax f.p.	Bill Doyle	Guest role
1995	The Man from Snowy River	James Duncan	Guest role
1996	Pacific Drive	David	Guest role
1996	Blue Heelers	Roman Kellerman	Recurring role
1997	Good Guys, Bad Guys	Arnold Tilson	Guest role
1997	State Coroner	Barry Davis	Guest role
1998	The Games	Brett Paine	Guest role
1999	The Adventures of Lano and Woodley	Garth Delancey	Guest role
1999	Pig's Breakfast	Malcolm Wilson	Regular role
1999	The Mick Molloy Show	Various	Guest role
2003	Stingers	Jack Devereaux	Guest role
2005	Holly's Heroes	Lenny Cropper	Guest role
2006	The Wedge	Various	Guest role
2007	City Homicide	Jim Conway	Guest role
2008	Canal Road	Joffa Degan	Guest role
2008	Very Small Business	Lloyd	Recurring role
2008	Wilfred	Show Host	Guest role
2010	City Homicide	Geoff Parnell	Guest role
2011	Mal.com	Malcom Mann	Regular role
2016	The Doctor Blake Mysteries	Noel Foster	Guest role
2019	Bad Mothers	Tony	Guest role

== Theatre ==
=== As actor ===
Year	Title	Role	Venue / Co.
1985	Legends		Fairfax Studio, Melbourne with VCA for Next Wave Festival
	As You Like It	Oliver	Grant Street Theatre
1987	The Hope	Michael	Studio Theatre, Melbourne, Playhouse, Perth & WA tour with Playbox & Western Australian Theatre Company
1987–1988	Dizzy Spells	Various characters	The Last Laugh
1990	Pigments of the Imagination		La Mama, Melbourne with Flying Pig Theatre Company
1991	Hair – The Tribal Love-Rock Musical	Claude / Leonard	Universal Theatre, Melbourne, Melbourne Athenaeum
1992	Up 'n' Under	Steve Edwards	Australian tour
1992	Dark of the Moon		Victoria College, Melbourne
1993	The Real Live Brady Bunch – and the Real Live Game Show	Doug Simpson	Comedy Club, Melbourne for Melbourne International Comedy Festival
1993	Shear Madness	Nick	Comedy Club, Melbourne
1993; 1994	Big Toys	Terry Legge	Malthouse Theatre, Melbourne, Ford Theatre, Geelong, Monash University, George Jenkins Theatre, Frankston, West Gippsland Arts Centre, Her Majesty’s Theatre, Ballarat, Monash University with Playbox
1994	Hey Jack!	Jack	La Mama, Melbourne for Melbourne International Comedy Festival
	Jaws The Musical	Dan O'Bannon	Victorian Arts Centre
1994; 1996	Romeo and Juliet	Paris	Royal Botanic Gardens, Melbourne with Australian Shakespeare Company
1995	Putting it Together	Narrator	Flinders Park, Melbourne
1996	Murder to Die For	Marlowe	Fairfax Studio for Melbourne International Comedy Festival
	X Files Unplugged	Smoulder	The Last Laugh
	Happy End	Bill Cracker	St Martins Youth Arts Centre, Melbourne
1997	The La Mama 30th Birthday Celebration		La Mama, Melbourne
1997	The New Rocky Horror Show	Brad Majors	Hong Kong Lyric Theatre with Adelaide Festival Centre Trust
1997	Effie X-posed	Phil	Universal Theatre, Melbourne
2000	The Linda Blair Witch Project	Various characters	Melbourne Town Hall
2002; 2003	Kissing Frogs	Various characters	Australian tour
2005	Control Freaks	Comedian	Duckboard House, Melbourne for Melbourne International Comedy Festival
2006	A Kind of Hush		Cinema Nova, Melbourne
2006	It's a Dad Thing!	Various characters	Australian tour with TML Entertainment
2007; 2009; 2010	Spontaneous Broadway	Chad Bradley	Australian tour
	Do You Know the Way to Ipanema		VCA
2011	It's a Dad Thing!	Various characters	State Opera Studio, Adelaide for Adelaide Fringe Festival
2011; 2014	Unpack This!	Geoff / Nguyen / Nicholas	Melbourne Fringe Festival & Victorian tour, Mt Compass War Memorial Hall with Redskin Productions
2016	Chad's Back in Yack		Yackandandah Hall
2017	Credentials	Stephen / Bruce	La Mama, Melbourne
2019	Mann Up and Take the Paine	Comedian	Melbourne International Comedy Festival
2022	Hearth	Father	La Mama, Melbourne

=== As writer / director ===
Year	Title	Role	Venue / Co.
2006	It's a Dad Thing!	Writer / Director	Australian tour with TML Entertainment
2011	It's a Dad Thing!	Writer	State Opera Studio, Adelaide for Adelaide Fringe Festival
2011; 2014	Unpack This!	Writer / Director	Melbourne Fringe Festival & Victorian tour, Mt Compass War Memorial Hall with Redskin Productions
2019	Mann Up and Take the Paine	Creator	Melbourne International Comedy Festival
