= Medivac =

Medivac may refer to:

- Medical evacuation (Medivac is often colloquially used instead of Medevac)
- Medivac (TV series), an Australian television series
