= Gabrielle Scawthorn =

Australian actress

- Born: Queensland, Australia
- Occupations: Actor, Writer
- Years active: 2010 - Present
- Website: www.gabriellescawthorn.com

Gabrielle Scawthorn is an Australian actress. She has appeared in numerous stage productions as well as TV and film. Gabrielle grew up in Ipswich, Queensland. She trained at NIDA.

== Career ==
In 2015, Scawthorn created the role of Abbey in Christopher Harley's play Blood Bank at Ensemble Theatre The following year, she returned to Ensemble Theatre to perform in a production of Jane Caferella's e-baby, a two-hander play where she played the surrogate in a gestational surrogacy arrangement alongside Danielle Carter and directed by Nadia Tass. In a review for Stage Noise, critic Diana Simmonds said "Largely through Gabrielle Scawthorn’s vivid, vanity-free and characteristically intelligent performance, the humour scattered about the first half is well to the fore. It means that the transition to a more serious and potentially tragic second half (it’s about 90 minutes straight through) is effectively achieved." Carter and Gabrielle Scawthorn were described as bringing "such life to their roles" and being "utterly believable – in equal parts loveable and frustrating – [so that] the heartbreak, when it comes, is visceral. It was the Sydney premiere of the play, which had only previously been produced in Melbourne in 2015, and was Caferella's first full-length play.

In 2017 Gabrielle starred in the Sydney premiere of the Penelope Skinner play The Village Bike directed by Rachel Chant. Scawthorn was nominated for a Sydney Theatre Award for her performance. Sydney Morning Herald critic, Elissa Blake, wrote of her performance, "One of the most expressive actors around, Gabrielle Scawthorn, has impressed in every show I've seen her perform in. This play feels like a match for her talent."

In 2018 Scawthorn performed at Darlinghurst Theatre as The Angel of Death in The Sound Of Waiting by Mary Anne Butler. Later that year she performed with Sport For Jove Theatre Company in the world premiere of Ear To The Edge of time by Alana Valentine. That same year, Scawthorn played the role of Darja in the Australian premiere of Ironbound by Martyna Majok, for which she received her third Sydney Theatre Award nomination. Critic, John Shand, wrote of her performance, "Gabrielle Scawthorn has Darja's essence spilling off the bus-stop bench like it's raining verity and there's no roof beneath which to shelter."

In 2019 Scawthorn premiered the one woman show The Apologists at the VAULT Festival in London. Later that year she returned to Australia to perform in the role of Louise in Steve Martin's The Underpants at The Seymour Centre in Sydney.

In 2020 Scawthorn appeared in a return season of The Apologists at The Omnibus Theatre in London.

She was the host of the Back From Reality podcast investigating the world of reality television and the impact that it has on the lives of its participants. On the show, Gabrielle also regularly reflected on her own experience as runner up on Channel V's Fresh Meat at the age of seventeen. Podcast guests have included The Vixen (RuPaul's Drag Race), Amy Hart (Love Island), Belinda Chapple (Popstars), Fiona Falkiner (The Biggest Loser).

Gabrielle was also a writer, performer and founding member of the Australian sketch comedy group, 'I'm With Stupid' featuring Matthew Backer, Hugo Chiarella, Briallen Clarke, Paige Gardner and Tim Reuben. The group began producing online sketches in 2013 before being selected to produce sketches for the ABC TV/Screen Australia comedy initiative Fresh Blood. Their sketches were broadcast on ABC2 and ABC iView in 2014.

In 2023 Gabrielle created the role of Suzy in "The Confessions" by Alexander Zeldin. The play toured Europe and had a season at the Royal National Theatre in the UK.

== Personal life ==
Gabrielle is married to director and writer, Hugo Chiarella. She currently lives in London and travels between the UK and Australia for work.

== Theatre credits ==
Year	Show	Role	Venue
2014	Stop Kiss	Sara	Unlikely Productions
2014	The Young Tycoons	Sherylyn	Darlinghurst Theatre
2015	Bloodbank	Abbey	Ensemble Theatre
2015	Ride and Fourplay	Alice	Darlinghurst Theatre
2015	Shakespearealism	Actor	Sport For Jove Theatre Company
2015	Love's Labour's Lost	Longaville	Sport For Jove Theatre Company
2015	Young and Jackson	Lorna	Fortyfivedownstairs
2016	Hurt	Alex	Old 505
2016	E-baby	Nellie	Ensemble Theatre
2017	The Village Bike	Becky	The Old Fitz
2017	Hurt	Alex	Belvoir/HotHouse Theatre
2018	The Sound Of Waiting	Angel of Death	Darlinghurst Theatre
2018	Ironbound	Darja	KXT Bakehouse
2018	Ear to the Edge Of Time	Martina	Sport For Jove Theatre Company
2019	The Apologists	Louise/Holly/Sienna	VAULT Festival, London
2019	The Underpants	Louise	Seymour Centre
2020	The Apologists	Louise/Holly/Sienna	UK tour
2021	The Apologists	Louise/Holly/Sienna	Old 505 Theatre, Sydney
2021	A Midsummer Night's Dream	Helena	Bell Shakespeare
2023	The Confessions	Suzy	Royal National Theatre

== Awards and nominations ==
Year	Awards	Category	Work	Result
2015	Sydney Theatre Awards	Best Actress in a Leading Role in an Independent Production	Stop Kiss	Nominated
2017	Sydney Theatre Awards	Best Actress in a Leading Role in an Independent Production	The Village Bike	Nominated
2018	Sydney Theatre Awards	Best Actress in a Leading Role in an Independent Production	Ironbound	Nominated
2022	Sydney Theatre Awards	Best Actress in a Leading Role in an Independent Production	The Apologists	Nominated

== Filmography ==
Year	Title	Role	Notes
2013	Deadly Women	Maid	Television series (Episode 'Brutal Bride')
2014	The Killing Field	Stacey Matthews	TV movie
2014	ABC Fresh Blood	Actor and Writer	Television series (3 episodes)
2015	The Doctor Blake Mysteries	Glenda Lambert	Television series (Episode 'Women and Children')
2017	No Appointment Necessary	Meredith Stanley	Film
