= Evie May (musical) =

- Music: Naomi Livingston
- Lyrics: Hugo Chiarella and Naomi Livingston
- Book: Hugo Chiarella
- Productions: 2018 Hayes Theatre, Sydney

Evie May is an Australian musical by Hugo Chiarella (book and lyrics) and Naomi Livingston (music and lyrics). Set in 1966 on the evening of the last Tivoli performance in Sydney, the show follows veteran variety star Evie May as she recalls the events that lead her from obscurity in regional Western Australia to the Australian variety circuit - and the many sacrifices made to get there.

== Productions ==
Chiarella and Livingston began collaborating on the show while they were touring in the Australian cast of Les Miserables. In 2016, the show was picked up for development by New Musicals Australia and secured a season at the Hayes Theatre in Sydney in 2018 with the support of the Australia Council for the Arts.

The original Australian production of Evie May opened at the Hayes Theatre on the 12th of October 2018. The show was directed by Kate Champion, with musical direction and orchestration by Steven Kreamer, musical supervision by Max Lambert, design by Anna Gardiner, lighting design by Sian James-Holland and sound design by Nate Edmondson.

== Original cast ==
- Amanda Harrison as Evie May
- Loren Hunter as Evelyn
- Bishanyia Vincent as June
- Keegan Joyce as Cole
- Tim Draxl as Heaney
- Jo Turner as Barlow

== Musical numbers ==
Act I

- At The Tivoli – Full Company
- Here I Am – Evie
- Ain’t No Dope – Bob, Barlow
- The Only You I’ve Ever Known – Evelyn, Barlow
- The View – Evelyn
- How The World Happened – Heaney
- The View (reprise) – Evelyn, Heaney
- The Life Of A Woman – June
- My Story - Evelyn, Evie
- Oh Baby Be Nice – June, Evelyn, Evie
- Bindy Do The Lindy – Evelyn
- The Curtain – June, Evelyn
- Belong – Evelyn
- Who Is That Girl – June, Evelyn, Evie
- They Say I Am Too Young – June, Evelyn, Evie
- Belong (reprise) – Evelyn

Act II

- Forgetful Sod – Evie
- Great Australian Digger – Evelyn
- Curtain (reprise) – Evie
- This Child – Evie, Evelyn
- How The World Happened (reprise) – Evie, Evelyn, Heaney
- And It Turns – Evie, Evelyn
- One Last Chance – Cole
- Show Me Where To Stand – Evie, Evelyn

== Reception ==
In her review for Stage Noise, critic, Diana Simmonds wrote of the show, "Evie May is rude, funny, sad and humane in its portrayal of lives and times now gone; yet when it comes to women’s place in the world, there’s much that’s familiar. And in a musical setting, with sharp, smart lyrics, the poignancy and politics are heightened and vividly coloured. This is a remarkable addition to Australian musical theatre". Judith Greenaway wrote for ArtsHub, "Evie May ends in a bareness of space, an echo chamber of those limited choices that empowered a modern movement. This is an entertaining, crafted, timely and relevant work." In his review for Stage Whispers, Peter Gotting wrote, "When the lights go up on this new Australian musical, there’s a sense of maturity - Sydney’s Hayes Theatre is now producing premieres of variety and accomplishment rarely seen in this country before."

== Recording ==
In 2019 a live cast recording of the show was released featuring the original cast. The recording was made with the support of The Russell Mills Foundation and The Ron and Margaret Dobell Foundation.

=== Track listing ===
All tracks are written by Hugo Chiarella and Naomi Livinsgton.

No.	Title	Performer(s)	Length
1.	"Here I Am"	Amanda Harrison	3:40
2.	"The Only You"	Loren Hunter, Jo Turner	4:05
3.	"How The World Happened"	Tim Draxl	2:58
4.	"The Life of a Woman"	Bishanyia Vincent, Hunter	4:01
5.	"My Story"	Harrison, Hunter	3:24
6.	"Oh Baby Be Nice"	Harrison, Hunter, Vincent	2:28
7.	"Bindy do the Lindy"	Hunter	0:44
8.	"The Curtain"	Hunter, Vincent	2:15
9.	"Who Is That Girls"	Harrison, Hunter, Vincent	1:02
10.	"They Say I Am Too Young"	Harrison, Hunter, Vincent	3:23
11.	"Forgetful Sod"	Harrison, Turner	4:27
12.	"The Great Australian Digger"	Hunter	2:42
13.	"From This Day"	Hunter	3:21
14.	"And It Turns"	Harrison, Hunter, Turner, Draxl	4:40
15.	"One Last Chance"	Keegan Joyce	3:56
16.	"Show Me Where to Stand"	Harrison, Hunter	3:52

== Awards and nominations ==
Year	Award	Category	Nominee	Result
2018	Glug Awards	Most Outstanding New Australian Performed Work		Nominated
2018	Glug Awards	Best Supporting Actor in a Musical	Tim Draxl	Nominated
2018	Sydney Theatre Awards	Judith Johnson Award for Best Performance by a Female Actor in a Musical	Loren Hunter	Nominated
2018	Sydney Theatre Awards	Best Performance by a Female Actor in a Supporting Role in a Musical	Bishanyia Vincent	Nominated
2021	APRA Professional Development Award	Music Theatre	Evie May by Hugo Chiarella and Naomi Livingston	Nominated
