= E-baby =

2015 two-hander play by Jane Cafarella

e-baby
- Original language: English
- Written by: Jane Cafarella
- Characters: Catherine; Nellie
- Subject: Gestational surrogacy, infertility
- Genre: Comedy, drama
- Setting: London, New York City, Boston; 2015–2016

Premiere
- Date: March 2015
- Place: Chapel Off Chapel, Melbourne

e-baby is a two-hander play written by Jane Cafarella that was premiered at Chapel Off Chapel in Melbourne, Australia, in 2015. It is set over a 16-month period in 2015–16 and deals with two women going through gestational surrogacy, the genetic mother of the embryo created by in vitro fertilisation, and the woman carrying the child.

== Plot ==
Catherine is an ex-patriate Australian lawyer living in London with her architect husband. Aged in her mid-40s and having been through 18 cycles of in vitro fertilisation treatments over 11 years, Catherine is desperate for a child and gestational surrogacy is her last chance. Nellie is a 28-year old Catholic woman living in Boston, Massachusetts, (where surrogacy is legal), with two children. As a lawyer, Catherine ensures that the contract formed covers various topics which Nellie had not considered. Nellie sees herself as altruistic, able to help Catherine's dearest wish for a child come true, but with different backgrounds, values, and wealth, some degree of conflict is inevitable. Once Nellie has become pregnant, Catherine's controlling nature causes friction and Nellie gradually asserts herself – most notably when the contentious issue of selective reduction becomes relevant – and as it becomes clear that Catherine resents the experiences of pregnancy and child birth which she is missing. Nellie's maintenance of a sometimes too-honest vlog is also a source of tension. As seen in the images below, the relationship comes to involve substantial conflict and tension with each displaying their worst selves, to the point where Nellie shouts at one point "I'm the one who's carrying this baby!" eliciting the cold reply "Yes. And I'm the one who's paying," from Catherine. In a play where money is generally not the issue, we are still reminded that surrogacy does raise issues of the commodification of human life and that differences in socioeconomic status cannot be entirely set aside.

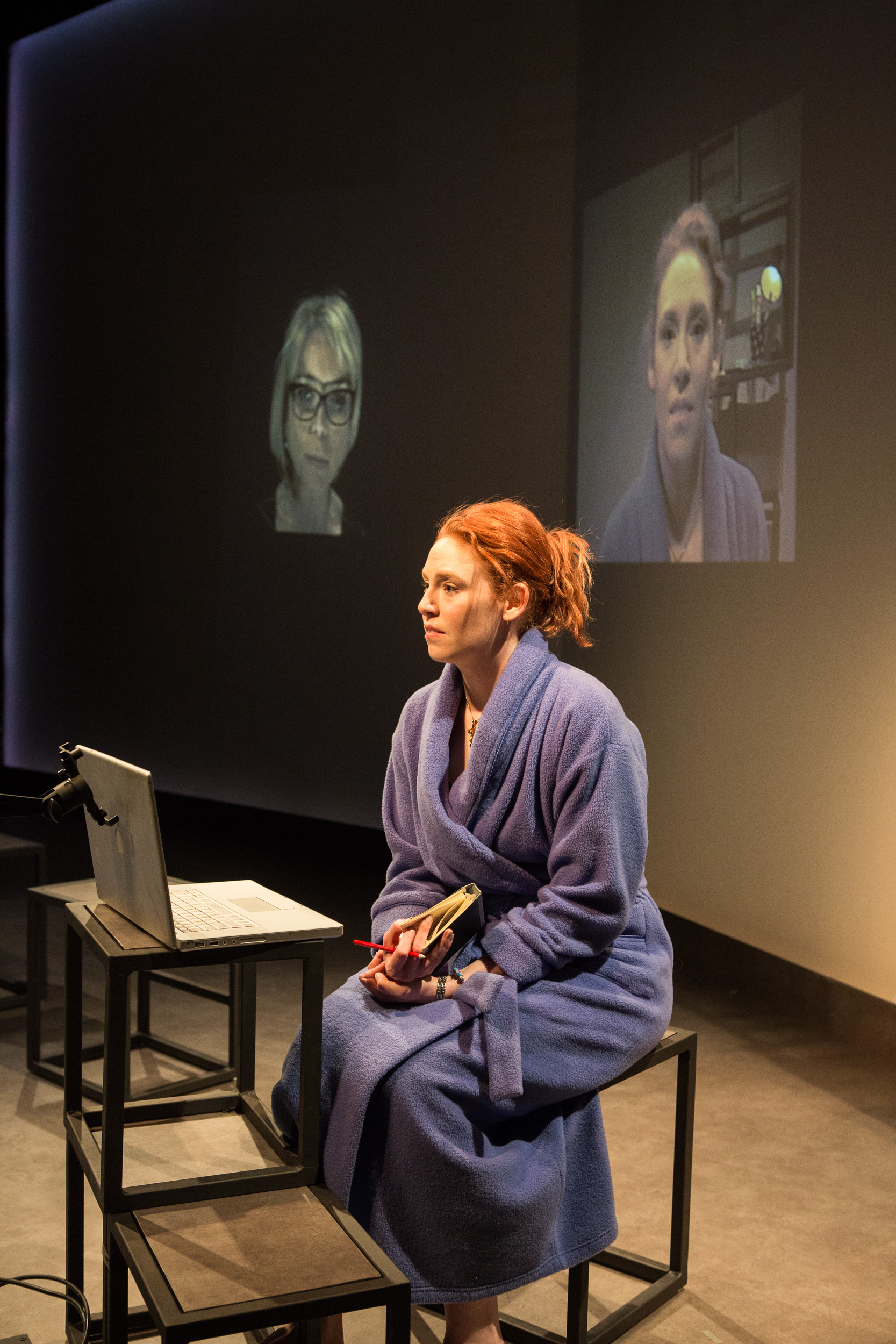
Nellie (foreground) with images of both women projected behind, from the Ensemble Theatre's 2016 production, photo by Clare Hawley

Scenes take place either in person in New York, or through electronic media (Skype, text messages, phone calls) with Catherine in London and Nellie in Massachusetts. In one production, this was achieved by having the two actors on stage, sitting at computers and looking into tripod-mounted video cameras, with the images being projected onto the wall behind the stage (illustrated at left). These enlarged images provide "magnified clarities for the audience to engage and learn from" and was described as an ingenious production approach as it has the effect of "[a]mplifying emotional moments for the audience" by allowing the audience "to see close-ups of their faces and be a fly on the wall for tough conversations". The reviewer for Stage Whispers expressed concerns that this use of projections and technology-facilitated communications would be a distraction, but praised its simple execution as seeming "entirely natural" and as adding to the experience by achieving a closeness to the actors that is rare, even in very intimate theatres.

== Background ==
Jane Cafarella was formerly a journalist, who began writing plays in 2011. e-baby is her first full-length play.

== Themes and commentary ==
Director Nadia Tass wrote "[t]his is a play for today – the advances in medicine create a new world that allows new possibilities – in e-baby we enter that world and explore the raw truth, the unbridled joy and the paradox of surrogacy through a carefully woven story of love, generosity and a newborn child." Cafarella chose to not delve into the issue of Nellie wanting to keep the child, allowing "more nuanced, if less dramatic, questions to be raised," and used decades of research to explore issues without passing judgement. Gestational surrogacy has been a subject for Cafarella for years, and she is praised for touching "on most of the biological, technical, ethical and legal aspects ... in the play's 95 minutes ... without the loud sound of boxes being ticked". Topics explored in the play which are regularly missed in exploring surrogacy issues include "the blasé comments from relatives, the cold legal matters in a contractual obligation, [and] the instances where abortion becomes the best option to save a life".

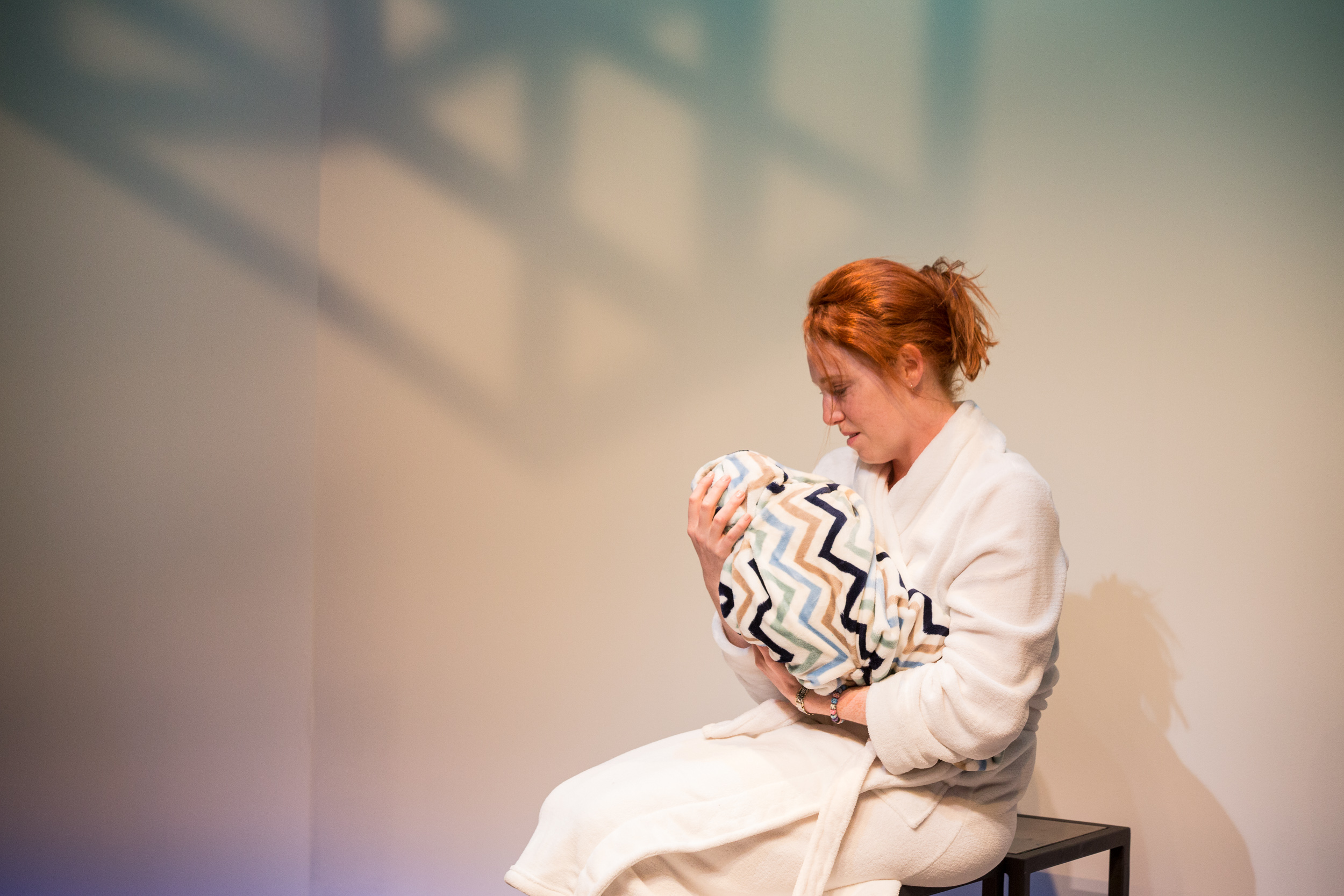
Nellie with the baby from near the end of the play (2016 Ensemble Theatre production, photo by Clare Hawley)

Catherine's character is both "excited about the prospect of being a mother" but also struggling with "the desperation and shame that she [feels] in fear of being seen as less of a woman," while Nellie is "not fully comprehending what she has agreed to, and [experiencing] the conflict this provokes with her religious beliefs," while each is dealing with a "forced" friendship. The play is character-driven by the unlikely bond and blurred lines created by a commercial surrogacy agreement.

== Production history ==
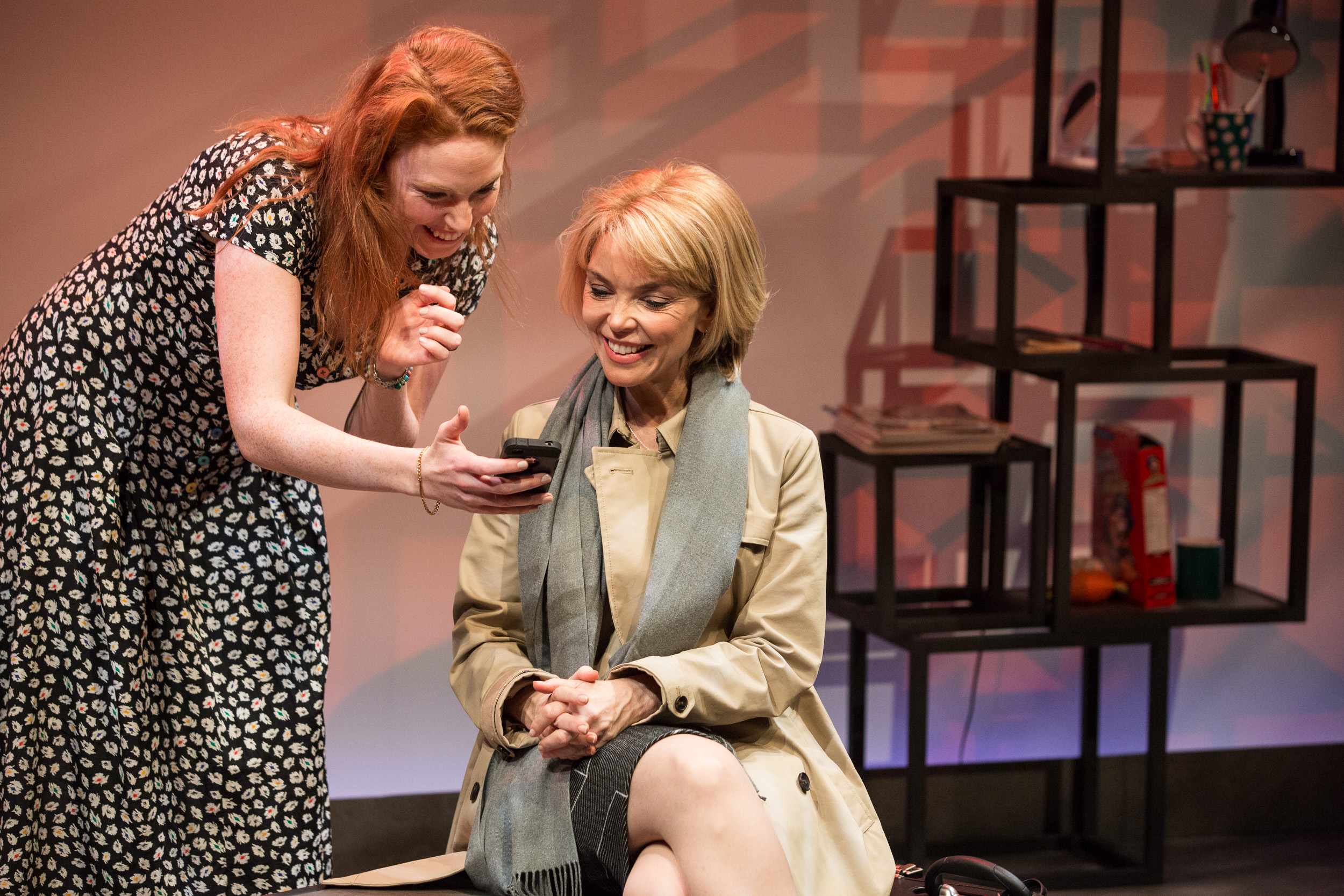
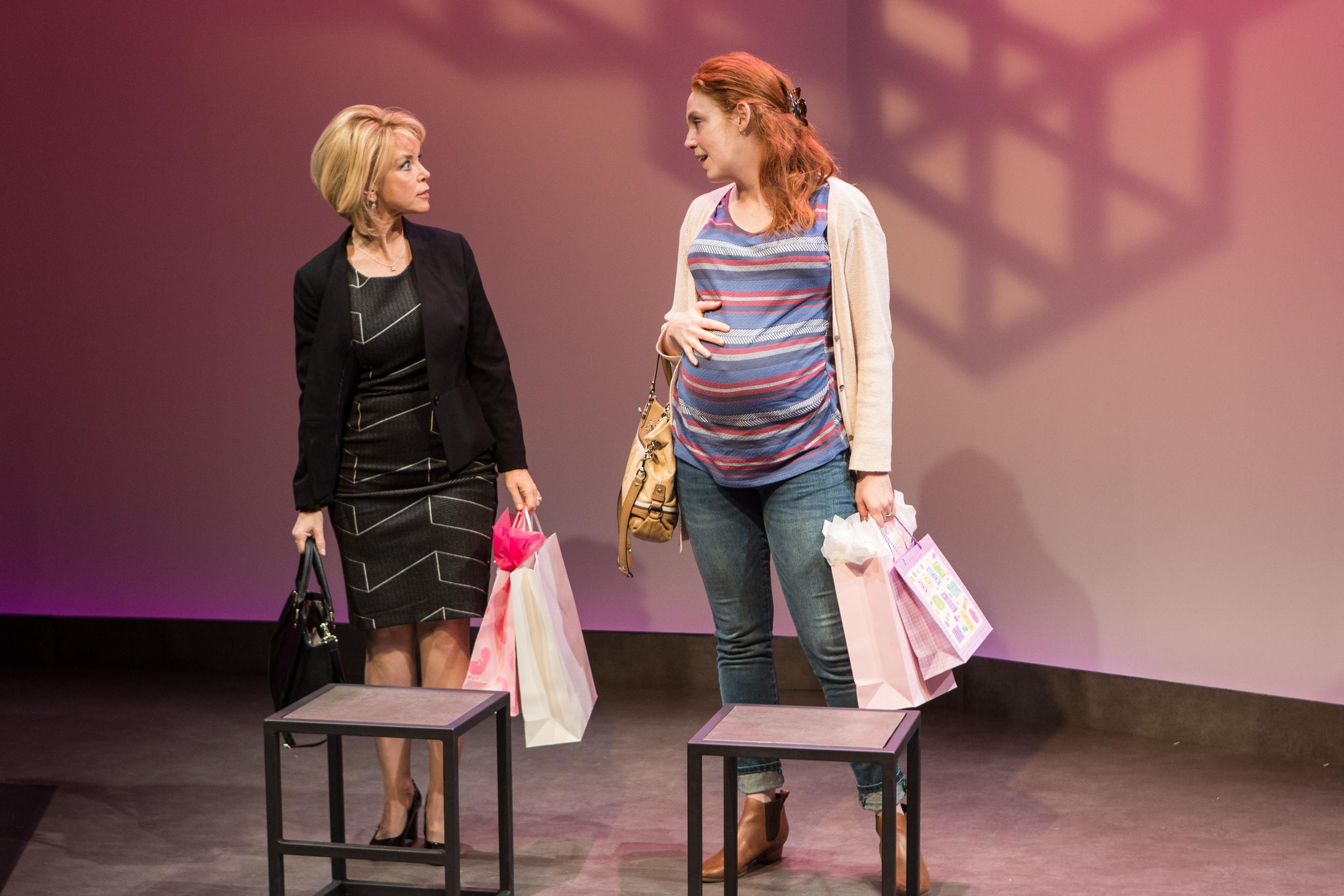
Carter and Scawthorn performing together in the Ensemble Theatre's 2016 production of e-baby. Top image early in the play, bottom later on, showing the change in the relationship between the two women. (Photos by Clare Hawley)

=== World premiere (Melbourne, 2015) ===
The play was premiered at the Chapel Off Chapel theatre in Melbourne in March 2015. Anna McCrossin-Owen was the director and dramaturg with Carolyn Bock (Catherine) and Sarah Ranken (Nellie) doing "a solid job in portraying the often-tense relationship between these two women".

=== Play reading (London, 2015) ===
e-baby received a rehearsed reading at the So and So Arts Club in London on 14 July 2015, directed by Pamela Shermann and starring Kat Rogers (Catherine) and Becky Hands-Wicks (Nellie). The club aims to link emerging and established artists, and the play was developed under the club's auspices; the club also reports that a companion piece to e-baby is under development.

=== Sydney, 2016 ===
The Sydney premiere was in October 2016, with the Ensemble Theatre under the direction of Nadia Tass, multi-award winner for her films Malcolm and Amy, and starred Danielle Carter as Catherine and Gabrielle Scawthorn as Nellie. Carter and Scawthorn were described as bringing "such life to their roles" and being "utterly believable – in equal parts loveable and frustrating – [so that] the heartbreak, when it comes, is visceral".

It received its Hobart premiere in March 2017 with the Tasmanian Theatre Company as part of the 10 Days on the Island festival.

== Reception ==
During its Melbourne run, the play was described by Patricia Tobin as a "quietly feminist play that asserts a heartfelt approach towards matters of infertility, adoption and motherhood". The story was described by Myron My in Theatre Press as affecting through its resolute avoidance of sentimentality, except for the ending which gave in to the sappiness which had been avoided until this point, though one reviewer of the 2016 Sydney production described the final scene as "like being slapped in the face, then hugged", writing "I left with tears in my eyes". Guardian reviewer Clarissa Sebag-Montefiore, writing about the Sydney production, criticised the play for cutting short difficult-to-watch scenes, rather than pushing deeper by allowing them to last longer, a weakness ascribed to Cafarella's relative inexperience as a playwright.

It "gives a gentle education to the uneducated on the intricacies of surrogacy" and "skims the surface like a light comedy," thus taking a "sensitive approach towards a poignant issue [w]ith its enthralling narrative and light comic touch". The play could delve more deeply into the topic as it does "touch upon morally heavy issues with a keen sincerity that is hard to resist" but in circumstances where "women's rights over our bodies are being condemned, scrutinised and attacked now more than ever, it does feel like there's something more to give".

Commenting on the Sydney production directed by Nadia Tass in 2016, Sydney Morning Herald reviewer wrote that Cafarella, who was formerly a journalist, "exhibits a journo's eye for research, balance and telling detail" in writing plays.

Fiona Cameron, writing in The Music about the Sydney production, commented that: "E-baby is a very rare theatrical beast: a two-handed play by women, starring women and about issues that affect women viscerally. Indeed, another such production doesn't readily spring to mind ... [and] the men in the characters' lives, well, they were so peripheral as to be almost incidental ... [in this] play about hope and trust and how two women who would otherwise never have crossed paths are connected by a surrogate pregnancy." This aspect was noted by other reviewers. Susanne Gervay of the Society of Women Writers NSW Inc described the play as a "bitter-sweet, funny, sad, real play of women". Carly Fisher stated that "[f]inding a play with a cast comprised solely of two women is very unusual – finding one that has been produced and is performing is even less of an occurrence. Hopefully, ... more theatre companies will see the potential that a duologue holds and just how captivated an audience can be by the presence of just 2 women." She also loved that money "was not the driving factor for enlisting as a surrogate but rather the burning desire to help someone fulfill a spiritual and moving part of the human condition and experience for a woman. This approach speaks volumes to the current climate in which the topics of surrogacy and IVF can be raised and presents a more humane interpretation of the surrogate than many other art forms have yet been daring enough to do".
