= Ensemble Theatre =

Theatre in Sydney, Australia

The Ensemble Theatre viewed from Careening Cove

The Ensemble Theatre is an Australian theatre company and theatre, situated in the Sydney suburb of Kirribilli, New South Wales. It formerly incorporated an acting school known as Ensemble Studios, until its closure in 2009.

== History ==
The Ensemble Theatre is Australia's longest continuously running professional theatre group, having given its first performance in Cammeray Children's Library on 11 May 1958. It relocated to premises in the old boatshed on the shore of Careening Cove in 1960.

The theatre was founded by Hayes Gordon, along with the Ensemble Studios acting school, which introduced Stanislavsky-influenced method acting to Australia. Ensemble Studios was one of Australia's longest surviving acting school when it closed in 2009. Its alumni included Lorraine Bayly, Reg Livermore, Max Cullen, and Jack Thompson.

Gordon passed on the position of artistic director of Ensemble Theatre to Sandra Bates in 1986, but remained principal of the acting school until his death in 1999. Bates was joined by Mark Kilmurry first as her deputy and then as co-director, with Kilmurry replacing Bates upon her retirement in 2015.

Due to the COVID-19 pandemic in Australia, the Ensemble had to postpone their 2020 Season. The company allowed ticket holders to convert their ticket to a credit voucher.

== Tributes ==
The Ensemble complex honours veteran stars Lorraine Bayly, incorporating Bayly's Restaurant, in recognition of her long-running commitment to the theatre (she was a founding member), to mark her retirement from the stage in June 2003; and Henri Szeps, with the Henri Szeps Room.

=== The Sandra Bates Director's Award ===
Incoming artistic director Mark Kilmurry initiated the Sandra Bates Director's Award (SBDA) in honour of Sandra Bates, who held the position for 30 years before her retirement in 2015. The award is sponsored by the Seaborn, Broughton & Walford Foundation.

Winners of the award include:

- 2016: Priscilla Jackman and Janine Watson
- 2017: Francesca Savige and Shaun Rennie
- 2018: Liz Arday and Felicity Nicol
- 2021: Ursula Yovich
- 2022: Danielle Maas and Sophie Kelly
- 2023: Margaret Thanos and Emma Canalese
- 2024: Julia Robertson and Miranda Middleton

== Notable productions ==
As of 2016 the most successful play in the theatre's history was Six Dance Lessons in Six Weeks, a two-hander which in 2006 paired Todd McKenney, in his first non-musical play, with Nancye Hayes. The pair reprised these roles ten years later, reuniting with Sandra Bates in her final directorial role. The play was taken on tour, in collaboration with Christine Dunstan Productions, and won the 2007 Helpmann Award for Best Regional Touring Production.

In 2016, the company produced the Sydney premiere of Jane Cafarella's e-baby, a two-hander "quietly feminist play that asserts a heartfelt approach towards matters of infertility, adoption and motherhood." Caferella's first full-length play which was world premiered in 2015 at the Chapel Off Chapel theatre in Melbourne. The production was directed by Nadia Tass, and starred Danielle Carter and Gabrielle Scawthorn; Carter and Scawthorn were described as bringing "such life to their roles" and being "utterly believable – in equal parts loveable and frustrating – [so that] the heartbreak, when it comes, is visceral". Tass, described e-baby as "a play for today – the advances in medicine create a new world that allows new possibilities – in e-baby we enter that world and explore the raw truth, the unbridled joy and the paradox of surrogacy through a carefully woven story of love, generosity and a newborn child."
