= Snow on Higher Ground =

Studio album by Keegan Joyce
- Released: 1 September 2016
- Recorded: 19–22 July 2016
- Studio: Black Pearl Studios, Melbourne
- Genre: Acoustic, folk
- Language: English
- Producer: Keegan Joyce, Søren Fisher

Singles from Snow on Higher Ground
- 1. "Cooma" Released: 18 November 2016

Snow on Higher Ground is the debut album from actor Keegan Joyce. The album is acoustic, and described by Joyce to have an 'Australiana folk sound'.

Joyce first released music on his YouTube account in February 2016. He premiered the song 'New Bridge Over Deadman's Creek' with Jane Patterson, which would become Track 1 on the album.

The album was released on 1 September 2016, initially available on iTunes and Bandcamp. Later, Joyce released purchasable album notes and vinyl copy of the album (limited to 300 copies and featuring only songs by Joyce) on his website.

== Track listing ==
No.	Title	Writer(s)	Length
1.	"New Bridge Over Deadman's Creek"	K Joyce	3:38
2.	"Knowledge"	K Joyce	3:35
3.	"Her Perfume"	K Joyce	2:31
4.	"Cooma"	K Joyce	3:08
5.	"Apparently I Was Selfish"	K Joyce	2:39
6.	"Cry, Cry Darling"	J Miller, J Newman	2:55
7.	"Sydney"	K Joyce	4:19
8.	"Rock, Salt and Nails"	B Phillips	4:14
9.	"Midnight Train"	K Joyce	8:40
10.	"Road Train Gone By"	K Joyce	4:50
11.	"Snow on Higher Ground"	K Joyce	4:16
12.	"Jewel atop the Crown" (Bonus track)	K Joyce	1:39
Total length:			46:24

Snow on Higher Ground LP
No.	Title	Length
1.	"Road Train Gone By"	4:50
2.	"Cooma"	3:08
3.	"Apparently I Was Selfish"	2:39
4.	"Sydney"	4:19
5.	"Her Perfume"	2:31
6.	"Midnight Train"	8:40
7.	"Knowledge"	3:35
8.	"New Bridge Over Deadman's Creek"	3:38
9.	"Snow on Higher Ground"	4:16
10.	"Jewel atop the Crown" (Bonus track)	1:39
Total length:		39:15

== Personnel ==
- Keegan Joyce - vocals, acoustic guitar
- Jane Patterson - vocals, violin
- Gerard Carroll - mandolin

=== Production ===
- Terry Hart - recording engineer
- Joe Carra - mastering
