= Mal.com =

Mal.com is an Australian children's television series which premiered on 28 October 2011 on ABC3. The series which consists of 13 episodes series was produced by Susie Campbell for Animazing Productions.

== Plot ==
Mal.com follows the adventures of a group of children who discover that one of TV's most popular hosts, Malcom Mann is actually a robot, otherwise known as a Male Artificial Life form. Television producer Holly picked him up cheap at an auction site and reprogrammed him to become the number one star on TV3, the number one TV network. The three homeless children - Jake, Daisy and the Kid - offer to keep quiet if she gives them a home, so they pretend to be his children.

== Cast ==
=== Main / regular ===
- Geoff Paine as Malcom Mann
- Danielle Carter as Holly
- Luke Ledger as Jake
- Ruby Hall as Daisy
- Gwy McKenna as Kid
- George Ashforth as Chas

=== Guests ===
- Peter Rowsthorn as Franky (1 episode)
- Roz Hammond as Janelle (1 episode)

== Allusions ==
In one episode a reference is made to Good Game: Spawn Point, where Mal gives a game rating of "8 rubber chickens" followed by rubber chickens being thrown at him, as Good Game SP hosts use rubber chickens to score games. Another episode features Mal filming a program called "Mal vs. Wild" a parody of Man vs. Wild where Mal ingests insects as Bear Grylls does, and in the same episode during an awkward scene they reference Prank Patrol.
