= DreamSong =

Australian musical by Hugo Chiarella

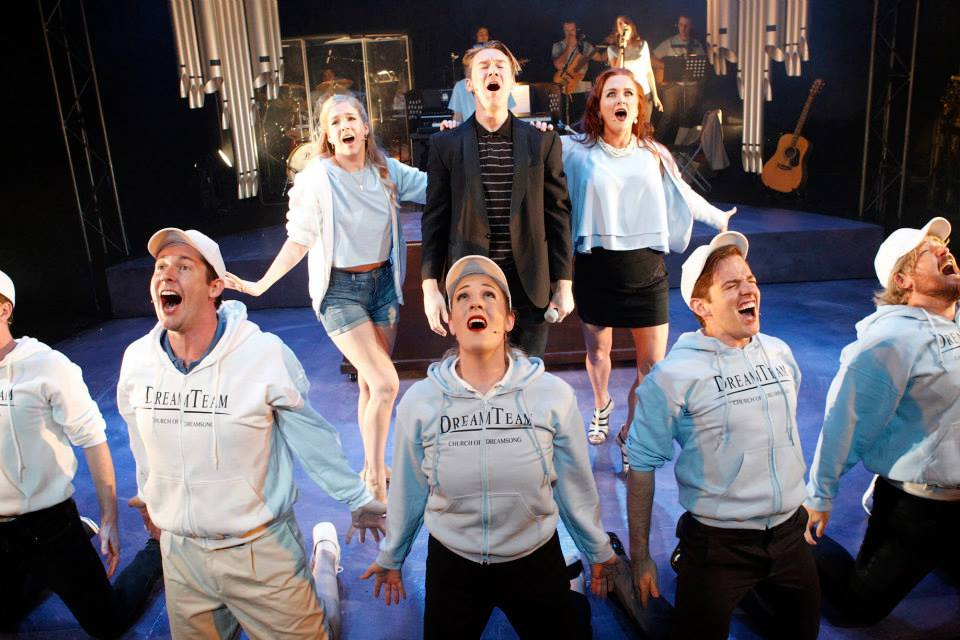
- Music: Robert Tripolino
- Lyrics: Hugo Chiarella
- Book: Hugo Chiarella
- Productions: 2010 Victorian College of the Arts, 2011 Arts Centre Melbourne, 2014 Melbourne International Comedy Festival, 2019 Alex Theatre

DreamSong is an Australian musical by Hugo Chiarella (book and lyrics) and Robert Tripolino (music). DreamSong is a musical satire about an evangelical megachurch that stage the second coming of Christ and market him as a Christian pop star. Meanwhile, the actual second coming of Christ occurs.

== Synopsis ==
The story centres around an evangelical mega church, DreamSong, and its Pastor, Richard Sunday. The church has lost millions in the bad investments and Pastor Sunday decides to stage the second coming of Christ and market him as a Christian Pop Star, as a way through their money problems. At the same time, summoned by the arrival of the anti-Christ, the real second coming of Jesus returns. While the fake Jesus cast his pop-ballad spell over the people of the world, the real Jesus has learned his lesson from his last experience on earth and is determined to keep a low-profile. As the two Messiahs come face to face in a final reckoning, the public are forced to decide what to put their faith in; truth or spectacle.

== Productions ==
While at university at the VCA, Chiarella began collaborating with fellow student, Robert Tripolino, on DreamSong. Chiarella wrote the book and lyrics and Tripolino composed the music. The VCA agreed to support the development of the musical and staged a full production in 2011 directed by Michael Gurr with musical direction by Daniel Puckey.

The show was selected as part of the Carnegie 19 New Music Theatre programme at Arts Centre Melbourne, where the show went through a workshop followed by a four night showcase, once again directed by Michael Gurr with musical direction by Andrew Patterson.

DreamSong then received a full production at Theatre Works in 2014 directed by Dean Bryant and choreographed by Andrew Hallsworth, with musical supervision by Mathew Frank and musical direction by Robert Tripolino.

DreamSong was revived in 2019 by EbbFlow Theatre Company in Melbourne with a production directed by Lauren McKenna at The Alex Theatre, St Kilda. The production featured musical direction by Maverick Newman and choreography by Maddison Lee. Chiarella and Tripolino updated the show extensively for the production, including the addition of a female Jesus Christ.

== Original casts ==
Character	Arts Centre Melbourne (2011)	Melbourne Comedy Festival (2014)	Alex Theatre (2019)
Pastor Richard Sunday	John O'May	Ben Prendergast	Nelson Gardner
Whitney Sunday	Sheridan Harbridge	Chelsea Gibb	Annie Aitken
Jesus Christ	Nick Christo	Brent Hill	Olivia Charalambous
Chris T./Paul	Sam Ludeman	Connor Crawford	Maxwell Simon
April Sunday	Stef Jones	Emily Langridge	Nicola Bowman
Prime Minister Cunningham	Simon Walton	Mike McLeish	Jarrod Griffiths
Neville Gruber	Nelson Gardner	Evan Lever	Bailey Dunnage
Clarice Haldeman	Briallen Clarke	Alana Tranter	Kate Schmidli

== Musical numbers ==
Act I

- DreamSong Song – Full Company
- Resurrection – Pastor Richard, Whitney, Cunningham, Clarice
- April's Prayer – April
- The Father Tells Us So – Full Company
- The Audition – Full Company
- Coming Home – April, Paul
- Funeral Song – Full Company
- Show Me Why – April
- Resurrection (reprise) - Pastor Richard, Whitney, Cunningham, Clarice, Neville
- I Hate Conflict – Jesus
- Just Have Faith – Chris T.

Act II

- The Carnival's In Town – Pastor Richard
- The Miracles – Chris T.
- Jesus Is My Boyfriend – April
- Pastor Richard's Soliloquy – Pastor Richard
- Resurrection (reprise 2) – Neville
- Jesus' Epiphany – Jesus
- Resurrection (reprise 3) – Pastor Richard
- It Isn't Fair – Whitney
- Just Have Faith (reprise) – Chris T.
- Wonders Will Never Cease – Jesus
- Forgive – Full company

== Reception ==
Despite its controversial subject matter, the show received mostly positive reviews. Cameron Woodhead wrote in The Age, "Viable new musicals don't come along every day. Dreamsong isn't perfect, but this satire on the far-right Christian lobby has more hits than misses... Music and action are seamlessly intertwined, and Dreamsong has an engaging storyline, brought to life with dynamic acting, vocals and choreography. The humour can be bleak (there are songs picketing gay funerals and abortion clinics), but the acid satire works well against the natural comic brio of Hill's shambolic, scaredy-cat Jesus".

Regarding the updated version of the show in 2019, Casey Bohan wrote for Theatre Travels, "Chiarella & Tripolino’s story is filled with heart and joy and it handles the delicate balance between making a statement and making fun with grace. It is clear this story, while taking place in a religious setting, is not about religion, but the human experience, temptations, tolerance and kindness above all else. No one is being laughed at, but the ludicrousness of some extreme intolerances are being pointed out and highlighted. It is a story for today, for its audiences and it is one worth paying attention to."
