= Keegan Joyce =

Australian actor and singer (born 1989)

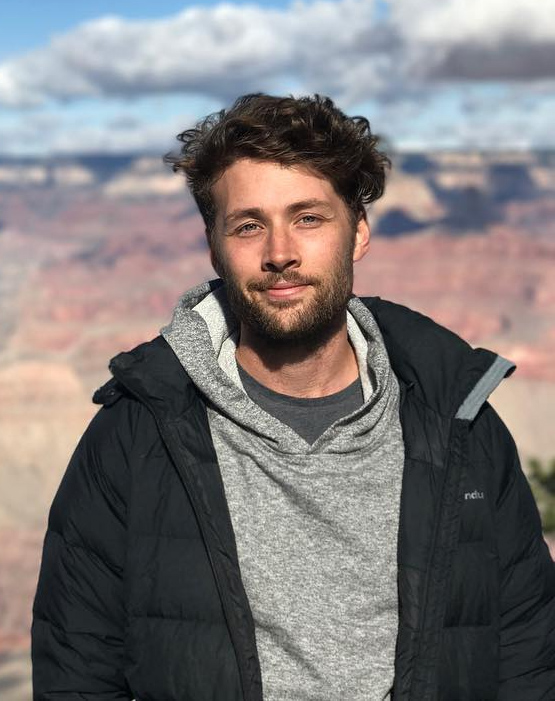
- Born: 25 August 1989 (age 37); Sydney, New South Wales, Australia
- Occupations: Actor, musician
- Years active: 2002–present
- Website: http://keeganjoyce.com/

Keegan Joyce (born 25 August 1989) is an Australian actor and singer.

== Early life ==
Joyce attended The King's School from 2002 until his graduation in 2007. He graduated from the Sydney Conservatorium of Music in 2014.

== Career ==
Joyce began his professional career when he portrayed the eponymous character in Cameron Mackintosh's production of Oliver!. He was the longest serving actor to play Oliver in the musical production of Oliver! touring Sydney, Melbourne, and Singapore. In 2006, Joyce joined the cast of the Australian production of Titanic: A New Musical. He also appeared in the 2006 film Superman Returns as a boy with a camera.

In 2009, Joyce played the character Starkey in the Doctor Who spin-off series K9. He portrayed the role of Andrej in the 2014–2015 Australian season of the musical Once.

In 2010, Joyce played Finnegan "Fuzz" Greene in Australian television series Rake. His character, teenage son of the series' protagonist "Cleaver Greene" played by Richard Roxburgh, appeared in all 8 episodes of the first season and has since appeared in all subsequent seasons of the show.

In 2014, he joined the cast of Please Like Me as Arnold, a young gay man who has an anxiety disorder.

On 1 September 2016, Joyce independently released his first album, Snow on Higher Ground. This was released on iTunes, Bandcamp, and on a limited vinyl.

In April 2018, Joyce starred in a production of Big River -The Adventures of Huck Finn.

In 2021, Joyce released a single, make a break for the ocean, under the pseudonym alter echo.

== Filmography ==
=== Film ===
Year	Title	Role	Notes
2004	For Every Year	Boy	Short film
2006	Superman Returns	Boy with Camera	
2009	Wall Boy	Wall Boy	Short film
2013	Greg's First Day	Greg	Short film
2017	Picking Up	Nathan	Short film
2018	Paper Cut	Guy	Short film

=== Television ===
Year	Title	Role	Notes
2009–10	K-9	Starkey	Main role, 26 episodes
2010–18	Rake	Finnegan "Fuzz" Greene	Main role, 33 episodes
2011	Rescue: Special Ops	Todd Rouse	Episode 3x13: The Dunes
2014–16	Please Like Me	Arnold	Main role, 26 episodes
2023	Wellmania	Sebastian	

== Musical ==
Year	Title	Role	Theatre	Location
2002	Oliver!	Oliver Twist	Lyric Theatre	Star City, Darling Harbour
2006	Titanic		Theatre Royal	Sydney
2010	Edges – A Song Cycle		Parade Theatre	Kensington
2014–2015	Once	Andrej	Princess Theatre	Melbourne
2018	Evie May	Cole	Hayes Theatre	Sydney

== Theatre ==
Year	Title	Role	Theatre	Location
2017	Vivid White	Rake	Sumner Theatre	Perth
2019	Solaris	Ray	Tour: Lyric Hammersmith, Royal Lyceum Theatre	Tour: London, Edinburgh etc.
2020	Cloudstreet	Quick	His Majesty’s Theatre	Perth
2020	Rules for Living	Matthew	Opera House	Sydney
2023	Nosferatu	Tom	Malthouse Theatre	Melbourne
2023	Hour of the Wolf		Malthouse Theatre	Melbourne

== Discography ==
- Snow on Higher Ground (2016)
