= Danielle Carter (actress) =

Australian actress

- Born: Sydney, Australia
- Education: National Institute of Dramatic Art (1993); Moscow Art Theatre School (2013); The Michael Chekhov School (since 2015)
- Occupation: Actress
- Years active: 1987–present
- Known for: Home and Away; Medivac; Something in the Air; Mal.com
- Website: www.daniellecarter.com.au

Danielle Carter is an Australian actress. She has acted in a number of popular television shows, films and plays.

== Education ==
After landing a recurring role in the television series Richmond Hill while still in school, Carter was accepted into Australia's National Institute of Dramatic Art, (NIDA), from which she graduated in 1993. Wanting to further hone her craft, she has since studied with the Moscow Arts Theatre School (in 2013), and The Michael Chekhov School in New York in (since 2015).

== Career ==
=== Television ===
Carter played Nikki Spencer in the soap opera Richmond Hill before it was cancelled in June 1988. She then had a recurring role as Jenny Owens in Neighbours (1989). In 1994 she took on the role of Rebecca Fisher in Home and Away for 17 episodes, after Jane Hall had previously played the role.

In 1996, Carter appeared in the series Pacific Drive as Saskia. She had regular ongoing roles as Bree on Medivac (1996–1997) and Sally on Something in the Air (2000–2002). In 2008, she played the wife of the notorious Australian underworld figure Alphonse Gangitano in the first series of Underbelly. In 2011 she played Holly in Mal.com.

Carter has had guest roles in G.P., Heartland, Murder Call, Flipper, BeastMaster, The Lost World, Halifax f.p., Blue Heelers, The Secret Life of Us, Stingers, City Homicide, All Saints, Satisfaction, House Husbands, Offspring. She has also appeared in the miniseries Mr & Mrs Murder, Paper Giants: Magazine Wars and Clickbait.

=== Film ===
In 2009, Carter appeared in the Nicolas Cage blockbuster Knowing as 'Miss Priscilla Taylor (1959)'. Following this, she appeared in Last Dance (2012), The Legend Maker (2014) and Rip Tide (2017) as well as a number of short films.

=== Theatre ===
Carter has appeared in numerous theatre roles throughout her career, with many of Australia's most prominent theatre companies including Ensemble Theatre, Sydney Theatre Company and La Mama Theatre (Melbourne). She has performed in Uncle Vanya. Hamlet, A Midsummer Night’s Dream, Richard III and My Zinc Bed, among others.

In 2016, Carter performed in the Ensemble Theatre production of Jane Caferella's e-baby, a two-hander play where she played the genetic mother of IVF embryos in a gestational surrogacy arrangement. It was the Sydney premiere of the play, which had only previously been produced in Melbourne in 2015.

== Teaching ==
Carter has worked as an on-set film and television acting tutor, and a performance coach for professional working actors. She has also taught courses at WAPPA, Victorian College of the Arts, Federation University, NIDA, The National Theatre Drama School, 16th Street, Film and Television International and St Martins Youth Theatre.

She wrote a book for Currency Press called "Racing Against Time", a handbook/guide for actors working in film and television.

== Filmography ==
=== Film ===
Danielle Carter film credits
Year	Title	Role	Notes	Ref.
1994	Kid in a Bin	Kate	Short	
2004	False Awakening	Nurse 1	Short	
2005	Eustice Solves a Problem	Betty Ann	Short	
2009	Knowing	Miss Priscilla Taylor (1959)		
2011	S.W.A.T.: Firefight	Officer Alex (uncredited)	Direct-to-video	
2012	Last Dance	Sophie		
2012	Reason to Smile	Mum	Short	
2013	The Hustle	Unknown	Short (also assistant to producer)	
2014	The Legend Maker	Helena Yussipova		
2015	Nothing Better	Sophie	Short	
2017	Rip Tide	Sofia		

=== Television ===
Danielle Carter television credits
Year	Title	Role	Notes	Ref.
1986	Comrade Dad	Cossackette	Episode: "The Lost Domain" (S1.E3)	
1988	Richmond Hill	Nikki Spencer	Regular role	
1989	Neighbours	Jenny Owens	Regular role	
1990, 1994	G.P.	Libby Walsh / Susan Denning	2 episodes: "Payback", "Making Mischief"	
1994	Heartland	Receptionist	TV miniseries. Episode: "1.4"	
1994	Home and Away	Rebecca Fisher	Regular role	
1996	Pacific Drive	Saskia		
1996–1997	Medivac (aka Adrenalin Junkies)	Bree Dalrymple	Regular role	
1998	Murder Call	Sharon Gavin	Episode: "Murder in Reverse" (S2.E7)	
1999	Flipper	Jean Carter	Episode 4: "The Wish" (S4.E4)	
2000–2002	Something in the Air	Sally Sabatini	Regular role	
2000	BeastMaster	Dar's Mother	Episode: "Valhalla"	
2002	The Lost World	Death	Episode 12: "The End Game" (S3.E11)	
2002	Halifax f.p.	Stevie	Episode: "Takes Two"	
2003	Blue Heelers	Andrea Gibson	2 episodes: "Father's Day: Parts 1 & 2" (S10.E14-15)	
2003	The Secret Life of Us	McKenzie Turner (Chloe's Boss)	Episode: "Be True" (S3.E16)	
2004	Salem's Lot	Margaret White (uncredited)	TV miniseries	
2004	Stingers	Alison Bray	Episode: "Starlight Hotel" (S8.E11)	
2005	Holly's Heroes	Ruth Milner	Episode: "Hospital Pass" (S1.E24)	
2007, 2010	City Homicide	Celia Joyner / Danielle Fraser	2 episodes: "Envelope Day", "Killer Moves"	
2008	Underbelly	Virginia Gangitano	2 episodes: "The Black Prince", "The Sorcerer's Apprentice" (season 1)	
2008	All Saints	Donna Griffith	2 episodes: "Beginnings", "Stepping Up" (season 11)	
2008–2009	The Elephant Princess	Ms. Clemment	5 episodes	
2009	Satisfaction	Margot	Episode: "Tess" (S3.E2)	
2011	Mal.com	Holly	13 episodes	
2013	Mr & Mrs Murder	Annie Bell	TV miniseries. Episode 3: "En Vogue"	
2013	Paper Giants: Magazine Wars	Julia	TV miniseries. Episode: "1.1"	
2013–2017	House Husbands	Dr. Dalton	5 episodes (seasons 2, 4–5)	
2017	Offspring	Margot Lee	4 episodes (season 7)	
2021	Clickbait	Wendy McFarland, TV Debate Moderator	TV miniseries, episode 4: "The Mistress"	

== Theatre ==
Danielle Carter stage credits
Year	Title	Role	Notes
1989	Dags	Karen / Wendy	Australian national tour
1992	Here Comes a Chopper		NIDA
1992	Uncle Vanya	Sofia Alexandrovna Serebryakova	NIDA
1992	Hamlet	Ophelia / Osric	NIDA
1992	That's Amore!		NIDA
1992	Metamorphosis	Greta	NIDA
1993	Bobbin’ Up	Nell	NIDA
1993	Road	Brenda / Dor / Leslie	NIDA
1993	Anna Karenina	Dolly / Seriozha / Maria	NIDA
1993	A Midsummer Night's Dream	Hermia	NIDA
1994	Hypothalamania	The Girl	STC
1994	Away	Meg / Leonie / Hermia	Riverside Theatres Parramatta with STC
1995	A Midsummer Night’s Dream	Puck	Original Theatre Company
1995	The Quartet from Rigoletto	Annie	Q Theatre, Penrith, Ensemble Theatre, Sydney
1998	Property of the Clan	Jade	Theatre 20/20
1999	All Things Considered	Joanna	Marian Street Theatre, Sydney
1999	Face to Face	Julie	Ensemble Theatre, Sydney
2003	Still	Order / Want Me	La Mama, Melbourne
2003	Flame / Still		Tower Room, Melbourne with Look Look Theatre
2006	Europe	Barbara	Victorian College of the Arts
2007	Seven Brides for Seven Brothers		Queanbeyan Conference Centre with Queanbeyan Players Inc
2007	Shadow Passion	Catherine Harrow	Chapel Off Chapel, Melbourne
2007	A Midsummer Night's Dream	Titania	Theatre Works, Melbourne
2009	The Cove (8 short works)	Sylvie / Estelle	The Dog Theatre, Melbourne
2009	Absurd Person Singular	Eva Jackson	Ensemble Theatre, Sydney
2010	Status Update	Coral / Adam	La Mama, Melbourne with Melbourne Fringe Festival
2011	My Wonderful Day	Paula Hammond	Ensemble Theatre, Sydney
2012	The Gingerbread Lady	Toby Landau	Ensemble Theatre, Sydney
2014	Richard III	Elizabeth	Ensemble Theatre, Sydney
2015	My Zinc Bed	Elsa Quinn	Ensemble Theatre, Sydney
2016	e-baby	Catherine	Ensemble Theatre, Sydney
2018	Fury	Alice	Red Stitch Actors Theatre
2018	The Norman Conquests	Sarah	Ensemble Theatre, Sydney
2022	When the Rain Stops Falling		Space 28, Melbourne with Clovelly Fox Productions
2022	Boxing Day BBQ	Connie	Ensemble Theatre, Sydney

=== As director ===
Year	Title	Role	Type
2007	Motor-Mouth and Suck-Face: An Apocalyptic Love Story	Director	Randall Theatre, Melbourne with St Martins Youth Arts Centre
