= Medivac (TV series) =

Australian television series

- Starring: Nicholas Eadie; Geneviève Picot; Graeme Blundell; Grant Bowler; Rena Owen; Caroline Kennison; Eugene Gilfedder; Danielle Carter; Mark Constable; Lisa Forrest; Stephen Lovatt; Dieter Brummer; Simone Kessell; Melissa Tkautz; Nique Needles; Ray Barrett; Sean Scully; Steve Jacobs
- Country of origin: Australia
- No. of episodes: 48

Original release
- Network: Network 10
- Release: 10 September 1996 – 1998

Medivac is an Australian television drama series that was broadcast on Network Ten from 10 September 1996 to 1998. There were 48 episodes produced. Medivac is an abbreviation of the term medical evacuation. The series was also known as Adrenaline Junkies overseas.

== Synopsis ==
Medivac is set in the emergency department of Brisbane's fictional Bethlehem West Hospital, where a dedicated medical team works in the demanding world of emergency medicine. The team specialises in the evacuation of disaster areas, journeying by helicopter to remote areas inaccessible by ambulance. They also work in the city streets and the suburbs involving themselves with the patients, their families and the police.

== Cast ==
=== Main / regular ===
- Nicholas Eadie as Dr. Red Buchanan
- Geneviève Picot as Dr. Julia McAlpine
- Graeme Blundell as Dr. Harry Edwards
- Grant Bowler as Dr. Arch Craven
- Rena Owen as Macy Fields, RN
- Caroline Kennison as Gosia Maléski, RN
- Eugene Gilfedder as Dr. Wayne Doubé
- Danielle Carter as Bree Dalrymple, RN
- Mark Constable as Dr. 'Oopy' Hiltonwood
- Lisa Forrest as Dr. Marina Zamoyski
- Stephen Lovatt as Dr. Tom Shawcross
- Dieter Brummer as Dr. Sean Michaels
- Simone Kessell as Dr. Stella O'Shaughnessy
- Melissa Tkautz as Evie Morrison RN
- Paul Mercurio as Roy Fields
- Andrew McKaige as Dave Callen
- John Gregg as Peter Michaels

=== Guests ===
- Aaron Blabey as Danny Haywood (2 episodes)
- Damien Garvey as Slugger (1 episode)
- Diane Craig as Mrs Flynn (1 episode)
- Garry McDonald as Ernie Sharp (4 episodes)
- Grant Dodwell as Paul (1 episode)
- Jeremy Sims as Mark Best (4 episodes)
- John Orcsik as Dr Cliff Houghton (1 episode)
- Jonathan Hardy as Rosenthal (1 episode)
- Josh Lawson as Rob (1 episode)
- Judi Farr as Arch's mother (1 episode)
- Kris McQuade as Carmel (1 episode)
- Lenka Kripac as Nikki Kershaw (3 episodes)
- Matt Doran as James 'Armalite' Dwyer (1 episode)
- Nique Needles as Leo VestI / Johnny Ryan (2 episodes)
- Ray Barrett as Frank Wheeler (1 episode)
- Robert Coleby as Bruce (1 episode)
- Russell Dykstra as Fitzpatrick (1 episode)
- Sarah Lambert as Francine Lord (1 episode)
- Sean Scully as Jack Duval (3 episodes)
- Stephen Curry as Damian 'Rhino' Ryan (1 episode)
- Steve Jacobs as Parker (1 episode)
- Tiriel Mora as Dr Dexter Haben (3 episodes)
- Wayne Pygram as John (1 episode)

== Episodes ==
=== Season 1 (1996) ===
No. overall	No. in season	Title	Directed by	Written by	Original release date	Viewers (millions)
1	1	"Sharing the Blame Part 1"	Geoffrey Bennett	Tony Cavanaugh	10 September 1996	393,000
Wayne and Bree fly out to the Glass House Mountains to rescue an injured hiker. Dr Harry Edwards is starting to burn out and wants Dr Julia McAlpine, Deputy Director, to take over his role. When she is passed over for Dr Red Buchanan, Julia hands in her resignation.
2	2	"Sharing the Blame Part 2"	Geoffrey Bennett	Tony Cavanaugh	11 September 1996	204,000
A ghost train becomes derailed, with multiple casualties. Julia makes a decision, with tragic consequences. Oopy's decision to aggressively treat a cancer patient upsets Gosia. Arch threatens to reveal Red's past. Red talks Julia into staying. Harry vows revenge on Red.
3	3	"Episode 3"	Peter Fisk	Everett De Roche	18 September 1996	233,200
A 58-year-old surrogate, carrying her own grandchild suffers complications. Arch medivacs a patient off Stradbroke Island, but disaster strikes. Harry is announced as the new CEO. Oopy misdiagnoses a patient and covers up his mistake by holding Macy responsible.
4	4	"Episode 4"	Di Drew	Greg Millin	25 September 1996	N/A
When an infection outbreak causes two patients die, the ward is quarantined and closed down. Marina and Julia chopper out to medivac a farmer trapped under a tractor. Macy is formally charged.
5	5	"Episode 5"	Alister Hallum	Adam Todd	2 October 1996	N/A
The disciplinary board suspends Macy for two weeks. A man in the end stages of terminal cancer begs for the doctors to end his life, causing an ethical dilemma.
6	6	"Episode 6"	Rob Stewart	Greg Millin and Tony Cavanaugh	9 October 1996	196,900
Arch tests to become a fellow of the College of Emergency Medicine, but nothing goes smoothly. Macy returns from her two week suspension. Finding her grandmother collapsed, a six-year-old girl directs the staff to her home over the telephone, but the old lady later dies in the hospital.
7	7	"Episode 7"	Di Drew	Adam Todd	16 October 1996	253,900
Red, Julia and Tank chopper out to an island to help with a mysterious outbreak, later discovered to be cholera. The army tries to cover up the situation for national security. Wayne is in charge back at the ward and lets the power go to his head, snooping through the personnel files.
8	8	"Episode 8"	Peter Fisk	Everett De Roche and Tony Cavanaugh	23 October 1996	N/A
Julia tries to commit a patient to a psychiatric ward, when he alludes to plans for a murder-suicide. Arch, Bree, and Wayne must rescue an injured skydiver and locate his detached arm. A stab wound patient cannot undergo a blood transfusion, as he may be a Jehovah's Witness.
9	9	"Episode 9"	Rob Stewart	Adam Todd and Greg Millin	30 October 1996	N/A
Harry collapses in the car park and is sped to emergency, but he refuses treatment. He eventually has a massive heart attack but is saved. Wayne and Gosia's ambulance is dispatched to a house where a shooting has occurred. Arch and Bree go on a dinner date.
10	10	"Episode 10"	Di Drew	Adam Todd	6 November 1996	N/A
Red and Bree rush out to treat a small boy suffering an acute asthma attack. Harry orders Red to close the Emergency department for a week, due to budget cutbacks and overcrowding. Red orders the by-pass be lifted but the consequences could be lethal.
11	11	"Episode 11"	Peter Fisk	Adam Todd	13 November 1996	N/A
Julia receives a needle prick while treating a recovering drug addict, who refuses to consent to a blood test. While the woman is sedated, Wayne forcibly takes a blood sample, which tests positive for syphilis, and he is later arrested. Arch and Macy's helicopter is forced to make an emergency landing.
12	12	"Episode 12"	Rob Stewart	Marcia Gardner	20 November 1996	186,700
Arch treats a man for what he believes is pneumonia, but is in fact tuberculosis. Wayne's assault charge is dismissed. Gosia tells Wayne that he owes her a favour. Julia confesses to Red that she caught syphilis from the contaminated needle. Julia and Red kiss.
13	13	"Episode 13"	Di Drew	Tony Cavanaugh	27 November 1996	N/A
Red's wife tells him that she is pregnant, but he's not the father. A medivac to an island leaves Arch and Julia stranded by an incoming cyclone with a dying patient. Red wants to have Wayne removed from the ER. Red reconciles with his wife and will be a father to her child.

=== Season 2 (1997) ===
No. overall	No. in season	Title	Directed by	Written by	Original release date	Viewers (millions)
14	1	"Episode 1"	Peter Fisk	Susan Macgillicuddy	24 February 1997	N/A
Red's wife undergoes an emergency caesarean. Red doubts whether he can accept the child as his own. Julia is left in charge as Acting Director. During intern assessments, Oopy is failed by Julia. Arch must choose between his band and his medical career.
15	2	"Episode 2"	Rob Stewart	Marcia Gardner	3 March 1997	N/A
While driving a patient home, Marina has a car accident and the patient dies. Bree ends her relationship with Arch. Red's day with his wife and baby ends in tragedy when a young boy falls into the river. A medivac must rescue a stranded hiker in the Glass House Mountains.
16	3	"Episode 3"	Di Drew	Adam Todd	10 March 1997	N/A
The world's longest surviving recipient of a baboon's liver collapses at his wedding and the media relays the event. Harry worries about the legal and publicity ramifications. It is discovered the patient has a deadly contagious herpes virus found in monkeys.
17	4	"Episode 4"	Peter Fisk	Peter McPhee	17 March 1997	N/A
Arch and Bree are faced with treating a gunman who has shot many people. Julia realises the shooter is Danny, who she tried to have sectioned months ago. A grief-stricken father searches the ER for the gunman who killed his daughter, and accidentally shoots Peter.
18	5	"Episode 5"	Rob Stewart	Susan Macgillicuddy	31 March 1997	N/A
Arch reluctantly accepts the Deputy Directorship. On a medivac, Wayne and Macy discover workers are electrocuting themselves, believing it is a cure for Ross River Fever. Gosia's ex-husband arrives from Alice Springs looking for her.
19	6	"Episode 6"	Graeme Blundell	Marcia Gardner	7 April 1997	N/A
Bree and Gosia realise Oopy has been moonlighting at a cosmetic surgery institute, when a medivac returns with one of the institute's former patients who is suffering from surgery complications. Arch cuts funding to an AIDS clinic, and pro AIDS research protesters react.
20	7	"Episode 7"	Peter Fisk	Susan Macgillicuddy	14 April 1997	N/A
Harry's old army friend Bruce wants the past put right, regarding the man they killed in Vietnam. A Papua New Guinean boy needs a mercy operation. Julia and Macy go on a medivac to save a shark attack victim. Harry realises Bruce is suicidal.
21	8	"Episode 8"	Rob Stewart	Adam Todd	21 April 1997	N/A
Wayne and Bree rescue a young school teacher, found naked in the bush. She is pregnant and claims aliens raped her. Wayne and Arch are called out again after a second 'abduction' and discover she is no longer pregnant.
22	9	"Episode 9"	Haydn Keenan	Peter McPhee	28 April 1997	N/A
A baby is in cardiac distress and Dexter Habin performs life saving surgery. Arch tests a zoology student for Lyssavirus. When a virus also threatens the life of Julia's friend and her horses, they find a bat colony. Wayne is bitten by one of Julia's horses.
23	10	"Episode 10"	Peter Fisk	Everett De Roche	5 May 1997	N/A
A fire at a building Harry owns burns down. Arch and Bree find a pregnant woman inside. Her baby is delivered prematurely and dies. Guilt-ridden Harry sets up a fund to help the woman. Duelling celebrity impersonators are admitted to the department.
24	11	"Episode 11"	Rob Stewart	Marcia Gardner	12 May 1997	N/A
Medical practices in the ER are criticised, resulting in Arch being investigated for manslaughter. Macy quits her job. A representative from the Vatican investigates a potential miracle (a patient cured of cancer) which Wayne witnessed.
25	12	"Episode 12"	Peter Fisk	Susan Macgillicuddy	19 May 1997	N/A
The team responds to an accident involving a bus full of blind kids. Arch is due in court, but helps on site. His bail is revoked and he is remanded in custody. Wayne and Gosia disagree over a girl who was used as a drug mule.
26	13	"Episode 13"	Rowan Woods	Peter Kinloch	26 May 1997	N/A
A gallery owner is speared by an Aboriginal artist he has been ripping off. The artist is arrested but has a heart attack. Oopy gives evidence against Arch. Bree finds out Oopy covered up a mistake and implicated Arch. The court case is thrown out.
27	14	"Romeo and Juliet"	Rob Stewart	Matt Ford	2 June 1997	N/A
After robbing Wayne's bank, a young couple crash their car. The man is fatally shot by his girlfriend, and she is shot by Peter. A paraplegic overdoses into a coma. Macy returns to her job. Harry is rescued from jellyfish stings by Bree. Dr Tom Shawcross arrives.
28	15	"Into the Abyss"	Peter Fisk	Anthony Morris	9 June 1997	N/A
Wayne, Tom, and Macy are taken hostage when a riot breaks out at a women's prison. A teenage girl lapses into a catatonic state and demonic possession is suspected. Julia tries to make Oopy quit.
29	16	"Gates to the Kingdom"	Geoffrey Nottage	Matt Ford	16 June 1997	N/A
Duval is asked to exorcise Nikki. As the exorcism progresses, Duval collapses and suffers a ruptured stomach ulcer, forcing Marina to finish the exorcism. Tom treats a woman suffering from orgasmic sneezing.
30	17	"The Promise"	Rob Stewart	Marcia Gardner	23 June 1997	N/A
The ER is quarantined when Nikki's blood tests show a strange antibody. Nikki dies. On a medivac, a ute explodes, injuring Dave's eyes. Marina guides the chopper to safety.
31	18	"The Sleep of Reason"	Peter Fisk	Graham Hartley	30 June 1997	N/A
Bree and Harry's relationship evolves. Dave professes his love for Marina. A man is suspected of causing a car accident and is attacked by the girlfriend of a man who died. Tom steals morphine to help his cancer.
32	19	"All The Saints And Angels"	Geoffrey Nottage	Matt Ford	7 July 1997	N/A
Marina has dinner with Dave. Marina risks her life to help a trapped man in a collapsed mine. A jockey dies after a fall, but the man's mother is opposed to organ donation.
33	20	"Second Chance"	Rob Stewart	Garrett Russell	14 July 1997	N/A
Marina spends the night with Dave. Arch proposes when Madeleine becomes pregnant, but she rejects him. The ER staff contract food poisoning. When a benefactor dies before signing a cheque for a new x-ray machine, Tom forges his signature.
34	21	"Silence"	Peter Fisk	Keith Aberdein and Tony Cavanaugh	21 July 1997	N/A
Gosia welcomes intern Sean Michaels. Oopy quits to become a cosmetic surgeon in Hollywood. Harry and Bree get engaged. Wayne and Peter investigate an abandoned building. Twins suffering heart attacks leave the hospital a donation.
35	22	"Last Sacrament"	Geoffrey Nottage	Adam Todd	28 July 1997	N/A
Macy develops a brain aneurysm, which bursts and she dies. Harry and Bree put their wedding on hold in honour of Macy. Wayne intends to leave the Department.

=== Season 3 ===
No. overall	No. in season	Title	Directed by	Written by	Original release date	Viewers (millions)
36	1	"Duty of Care"	Peter Fisk	Marcia Gardner	TBA	TBD
Rhino collapses during a soccer match, due to Guillain-Barre Syndrome. Julia passes over Gosia as the department's new Nurse Manager. A patient has taken medication which clashes with his gout medicine, leading to a severe reaction.
37	2	"Sharing the Blame"	Graeme Blundell	Matt Ford	TBA	TBD
A yachting victim brings luggage into the hospital, but it contains cocaine. The yacht's skipper, is a smuggler who is on his way to pick up the drugs. A patient nearly dies and Eric is to blame. Eric quits as Nurse Manager and Julia suggests Gosia for the role.
38	3	"Protection"	Di Drew	John Coulter	TBA	TBD
Stella's brother turns up with a gunshot wound and thugs come looking for him job. Stella and Marina disagree over a 14-year-old being put on the pill. Julia and Tom's friendship develops into something more.
39	4	"Pity"	Peter Fisk	Tim Pye	TBA	TBD
Tom and Arch are called out to a violent domestic dispute. Unable to remove her wedding ring, the woman amputates her own finger. A man with Korsakov's Syndrome comes into ER. Sean discovers Tom's file. Dave asks Marina to move in with him.
40	5	"Calling the Shots"	Graeme Blundell	John Concannon and John Coulter	TBA	TBD
Evie and Stella disagree over treatment of a suspected drug addict. The patient is readmitted after an OD and dies. Marina leaves the convent and feels she now has to move in with Dave. Gosia finds accommodation for Ernie at a detox centre.
41	6	"Denial"	Julian McSwiney	Adam Todd	TBA	TBD
Tom takes a special interest in a cancer-ridden patient, wanting her to receive palliative care, while Arch tries to have her accept her imminent death. Dave proposes to Marina, but she refuses. Arch discovers Tom and Julia's relationship.
42	7	"Feet of Clay"	Peter Fisk	John Concannon and John Coulter	TBA	TBD
Stella's brother is brutally beaten and dies from his injuries. Ernie's tragic past is revealed – as a doctor he was unable to save the life of his wife, which led to alcoholism. Sean saves Evie when their ambulance gets into an accident.
43	8	"Code Purple"	Malcolm McDonald	Denise Morgan	TBA	TBD
A boy fakes an illness because he doesn't want to go to church to confess his 'sins'. A man ingests a fish hook on a drunken dare. In pain, Tom takes morphine but collapses. Sean's phobia surfaces when a girl and her pet spider are admitted.
44	9	"Wants and Needs"	Geoffrey Nottage	Marcia Gardner	TBA	TBD
Sean, Evie, and Gosia treat a boy with a broken leg but find homeless kids living in an underground sewer and a man with a 16th century sweating sickness. Marina suspects she is being stalked. Tom's cancer is getting worse and Arch wants him replaced.
45	10	"Boy Scout"	Peter Fisk	Matt Ford	TBA	TBD
When called out to an isolated farmhouse, Sean and Evie's pilot is murdered and their helicopter is stolen. As Tom returns to work, Arch wants him placed on the impaired practitioners register.
46	11	"True Colours"	Karl Zwicky	Marcia Gardner	TBA	TBD
Marina's stalker gets a job at the hospital. Soon afterwards, Mark attacks her, but Arch saves her. Tom collapses while working on a patient and Dr Peter Michaels tells him it's time to leave his job. Stella informs Tom of a new experimental cancer trial.
47	12	"When People Love You"	Graeme Blundell	Denise Morgan	TBA	TBD
A gambling addict is brought in following a suicide attempt. He is then diagnosed with terminal kidney failure. Marina resigns, unsure about her relationship with Arch. Tom's cancer therapy is not working. Julia and Tom get married.
48	13	"God's Greatest Gift"	Peter Fisk	John Coulter and John Concannon	TBA	TBD
Tom goes into cardiac arrest and must be rushed to ER to be revived. Marina return to the convent, but then decides to give her relationship with Arch a go. Sean and Evie reunite and Evie receives a scholarship.

== Filming locations ==
The former Australian Taxation Office building at 320 Adelaide Street, on the corner of Wharf Street in the Brisbane CBD, was used as the location of the hospital.

The old Brisbane Domestic Airport terminal area where the car auctions are held, was used for a scene set in western Queensland. The tarmac was covered in dirt for filming.
