= Credentials (play) =

Play by David Williamson

- Original language: English
- Written by: David Williamson
- Characters: 3F 4 M
- Subject: class in Australia
- Genre: social realism

Premiere
- Date: La Mama Theatre 2017
- Place: Melbourne, Australia

Credentials is a play by David Williamson. It had its premiere at La Mama in 2017 and was part of that theatre's 50th anniversary celebrations.

== Plot ==
Chrissie is working as an ambulance paramedic. Thee director of paramedical services discovers that her qualifications are totally faked.

== Reception ==
The Sydney Morning Herald reviewing the 2017 Melbourne production said the play "has meat for actors to sink their teeth into" and "Any new Williamson play attracts wide interest, and this is a better, riskier, and more ambitious work than anything he's written recently."
