= List of Queensland rugby league team squads =

This article shows the players that have played for the Queensland State of Origin team in every State of Origin series.

== 1980 game ==
- Only one State of Origin game was played in both 1980 and 1981

Position	1980
Fullback	Colin Scott
Wing	Kerry Boustead
Centre	Mal Meninga
Centre	Chris Close
Wing	Brad Backer
Five-Eighth	Alan Smith
Halfback	Greg Oliphant
Prop	Rod Morris
Hooker	John Lang
Prop	Arthur Beetson (c)
Second Row	Rohan Hancock
Second Row	Rod Reddy
Lock	Wally Lewis
Replacement	Norm Carr
Replacement	Bruce Astill

== 1981 game ==
Position	1981
Fullback	Colin Scott
Wing	Brad Backer
Centre	Mal Meninga
Centre	Chris Close
Wing	Mitch Brennan
Five-Eighth	Wally Lewis (c)
Halfback	Ross Henrick
Prop	Paul Khan
Hooker	Greg Conescu
Prop	Rod Morris
Second Row	Rohan Hancock
Second Row	Paul McCabe
Lock	Chris Phelan
Replacement	Norm Carr
Replacement	Mark Murray

== 1982 Series ==
Position	Game 1	Game 2	Game 3
Fullback	Colin Scott		Mitch Brennan
Wing	John Ribot		
Centre	Mitch Brennan		Gene Miles
Centre	Mal Meninga	Graham Quinn	Mal Meninga
Wing	Kerry Boustead	Brad Backer	Kerry Boustead
Five-Eighth	Wally Lewis (c)		
Halfback	Mark Murray		
Prop	Rohan Hancock		Rod Morris
Hooker	John Dowling		
Prop	Paul Khan		
Second Row	Bruce Walker	Rod Morris	Rohan Hancock
Second Row	Paul McCabe		
Lock	Paul Vautin	Norm Carr	
Replacement	Bob Kellaway	Greg Holben	Tony Currie
Replacement	Gene Miles	Paul Vautin	
Coach	Arthur Beetson		

== 1983 Series ==
Position	Game 1	Game 2	Game 3
Fullback	Colin Scott		
Wing	John Ribot	Terry Butler	Steve Stacey
Centre	Mal Meninga		
Centre	Gene Miles		
Wing	Steve Stacey	Chris Close	Mitch Brennan
Five-Eighth	Wally Lewis (c)		
Halfback	Mark Murray		
Prop	Brad Tessmann		
Hooker	Greg Conescu		
Prop	Darryl Brohman	Dave Brown	
Second Row	Bryan Niebling		
Second Row	Paul Vautin	Wally Fullerton-Smith	
Lock	Dave Brown	Paul Vautin	
Replacement	Brett French		Bruce Astill
Replacement	Wally Fullerton-Smith	Ross Henrick	Gavin Jones

== 1984 Series ==
Position	Game 1	Game 2	Game 3
Fullback	Colin Scott		
Wing	Kerry Boustead		John Ribot
Centre	Mal Meninga	Chris Close	Mal Meninga
Centre	Gene Miles		Brett French
Wing	Chris Close	Mal Meninga	Kerry Boustead
Five-Eighth	Wally Lewis (c)		
Halfback	Mark Murray		Ross Henrick
Prop	Greg Dowling		
Hooker	Greg Conescu		
Prop	Dave Brown		
Second Row	Bryan Niebling		Chris Phelan
Second Row	Wally Fullerton-Smith		
Lock	Paul Vautin		Bob Lindner
Replacement	Brett French	Bob Lindner	Bob Kellaway
Replacement	Bob Lindner	Tony Currie	

== 1985 Series ==
Position	Game 1	Game 2	Game 3
Fullback	Colin Scott		
Wing	John Ribot		
Centre	Mal Meninga		
Centre	Chris Close		
Wing	Dale Shearer		
Five-Eighth	Wally Lewis (c)		
Halfback	Mark Murray		
Prop	Greg Dowling		
Hooker	Greg Conescu		
Prop	Dave Brown		
Second Row	Paul Vautin		Ian French
Second Row	Paul McCabe	Wally Fullerton-Smith	
Lock	Bob Lindner		Paul Vautin
Replacement	Brett French	Tony Currie	
Replacement	Ian French		Cavill Heugh

== 1986 Series ==
Position	Game 1	Game 2	Game 3
Fullback	Colin Scott	Gary Belcher	
Wing	Dale Shearer		
Centre	Mal Meninga		
Centre	Gene Miles		
Wing	Chris Close	Les Kiss	
Five-Eighth	Wally Lewis (c)		
Halfback	Mark Murray		
Prop	Greg Dowling	Cavill Heugh	Brad Tessmann
Hooker	Greg Conescu		
Prop	Dave Brown	Darryl Brohman	Cavill Heugh
Second Row	Bryan Niebling	Bob Lindner	Bryan Niebling
Second Row	Gavin Jones		
Lock	Bob Lindner	Ian French	Bob Lindner
Replacement	Peter Jackson		
Replacement	Ian French	Brad Tessmann	Ian French

== 1987 Series ==
Position	Game 1	Game 2	Game 3	Game 4
Fullback	Gary Belcher			
Wing	Tony Currie	Colin Scott		Tony Currie
Centre	Peter Jackson			
Centre	Gene Miles			
Wing	Dale Shearer			
Five-Eighth	Wally Lewis (c)			
Halfback	Allan Langer			
Prop	Greg Dowling			
Hooker	Greg Conescu			
Prop	Martin Bella		Bryan Niebling	
Second Row	Trevor Gillmeister			
Second Row	Paul Vautin			
Lock	Ian French	Bob Lindner		
Replacement	Colin Scott	Tony Currie		Colin Scott
Replacement	Gary Smith	Ian French		

== 1988 Series ==
Position	Game 1	Game 2	Game 3
Fullback	Gary Belcher		
Wing	Alan McIndoe		
Centre	Gene Miles	Peter Jackson	
Centre	Tony Currie	Gene Miles	Tony Currie
Wing	Joe Kilroy	Tony Currie	Joe Kilroy
Five-Eighth	Peter Jackson	Wally Lewis (c)	
Halfback	Allan Langer		
Prop	Sam Backo		
Hooker	Greg Conescu		
Prop	Martin Bella		
Second Row	Wally Fullerton-Smith		
Second Row	Bob Lindner		
Lock	Paul Vautin (c)	Paul Vautin	
Replacement	Brett French		
Replacement	Scott Tronc	Trevor Gillmeister	

== 1989 Series ==
Position	Game 1	Game 2	Game 3
Fullback	Gary Belcher		
Wing	Alan McIndoe		
Centre	Tony Currie		
Centre	Mal Meninga		Dale Shearer
Wing	Michael Hancock		
Five-Eighth	Wally Lewis (c)		
Halfback	Allan Langer		Michael Hagan
Prop	Martin Bella		
Hooker	Kerrod Walters		
Prop	Dan Stains	Sam Backo	
Second Row	Paul Vautin		Dan Stains
Second Row	Gene Miles		
Lock	Bob Lindner		Paul Vautin
Replacement	Dale Shearer		Kevin Walters
Replacement	Michael Hagan		Peter Jackson
Replacement	Trevor Gillmeister		
Replacement	Gary Coyne		

== 1990 Series ==
Position	Game 1	Game 2	Game 3
Fullback	Gary Belcher		
Wing	Alan McIndoe		
Centre	Dale Shearer		
Centre	Mal Meninga		Peter Jackson
Wing	Les Kiss		Willie Carne
Five-Eighth	Michael Hagan	Wally Lewis (c)	
Halfback	Allan Langer		
Prop	Martin Bella		
Hooker	Steve Walters	Kerrod Walters	
Prop	Dan Stains	Sam Backo	
Second Row	Paul Vautin (c)	Dan Stains	Trevor Gillmeister
Second Row	Wally Fullerton-Smith	Gary Coyne	
Lock	Bob Lindner		
Replacement	Mark Coyne	Trevor Gillmeister	Kevin Walters
Replacement	Kevin Walters	Andrew Gee	Michael Hagan
Replacement	Gary Coyne	Mark Coyne	Andrew Gee
Replacement	Trevor Gillmeister	Kevin Walters	Steve Jackson

== 1991 Series ==
Position	Game 1	Game 2	Game 3
Fullback	Paul Hauff		
Wing	Michael Hancock		
Centre	Peter Jackson		
Centre	Mal Meninga		
Wing	Willie Carne		
Five-Eighth	Wally Lewis (c)		
Halfback	Allan Langer		
Prop	Martin Bella		
Hooker	Steve Walters		
Prop	Steve Jackson		
Second Row	Andrew Gee		
Second Row	Mike McLean		
Lock	Gary Larson		
Interchange	Kevin Walters		
Interchange	Steve Renouf	Dale Shearer	
Interchange	Gary Coyne		
Interchange	Gavin Allen		Bob Lindner

== 1992 Series ==
Position	Game 1	Game 2	Game 3
Fullback	Dale Shearer		
Wing	Michael Hancock		
Centre	Mal Meninga (c)		
Centre	Peter Jackson	Mark Coyne	
Wing	Willie Carne	Adrian Brunker	
Five-Eighth	Kevin Walters	Peter Jackson	
Halfback	Allan Langer		
Prop	Martin Bella		
Hooker	Steve Walters		
Prop	Steve Jackson	Gavin Allen	
Second Row	Bob Lindner		Mike McLean
Second Row	Trevor Gillmeister	Gary Larson	
Lock	Gary Larson	Billy Moore	
Interchange	Mark Coyne	Kevin Walters	
Interchange	Gary Coyne	Trevor Gillmeister	
Interchange	Steve Renouf	Mike McLean	Steve Jackson
Interchange	Gavin Allen	Darren Smith	

== 1993 Series ==
Position	Game 1	Game 2	Game 3
Fullback	Gary Belcher	Dale Shearer	
Wing	Willie Carne		Brett Dallas
Centre	Mal Meninga (c)		
Centre	Steve Renouf	Mark Coyne	
Wing	Michael Hancock	Adrian Brunker	Willie Carne
Five-Eighth	Kevin Walters		Julian O'Neill
Halfback	Allan Langer		
Prop	Martin Bella		
Hooker	Steve Walters		
Prop	Steve Jackson	Mark Hohn	
Second Row	Bob Lindner	Trevor Gillmeister	
Second Row	Gary Larson		
Lock	Billy Moore	Bob Lindner	
Interchange	Mark Coyne	Julian O'Neill	Kevin Walters
Interchange	Dale Shearer	Steve Jackson	Darren Smith
Interchange	Mark Hohn	Billy Moore	Steve Jackson
Interchange	Andrew Gee	Darren Smith	Billy Moore

== 1994 Series ==
Position	Game 1	Game 2	Game 3
Fullback	Julian O'Neill		
Wing	Michael Hancock		
Centre	Mal Meninga (c)		
Centre	Steve Renouf	Mark Coyne	Steve Renouf
Wing	Willie Carne		
Five-Eighth	Kevin Walters		
Halfback	Allan Langer		
Prop	Martin Bella	Darren Fritz	
Hooker	Steve Walters	Kerrod Walters	Steve Walters
Prop	Andrew Gee		Mark Hohn
Second Row	Trevor Gillmeister		Billy Moore
Second Row	Gary Larson		
Lock	Billy Moore		Jason Smith
Interchange	Mark Coyne	Gorden Tallis	
Interchange	Darren Smith		
Interchange	Mark Hohn		Mark Coyne
Interchange	Darren Fritz	Adrian Vowles	Andrew Gee

== 1995 Series ==
Position	Game 1	Game 2	Game 3
Fullback	Robbie O'Davis		
Wing	Brett Dallas		
Centre	Mark Coyne		
Centre	Danny Moore		
Wing	Matt Sing		
Five-Eighth	Dale Shearer	Jason Smith	
Halfback	Adrian Lam		
Prop	Tony Hearn		
Hooker	Wayne Bartrim		
Prop	Gavin Allen		
Second Row	Trevor Gillmeister (c)		
Second Row	Gary Larson		
Lock	Billy Moore		
Interchange	Ben Ikin		
Interchange	Terry Cook		
Interchange	Mark Hohn		
Interchange	Craig Teevan		

== 1996 Series ==
Position	Game 1	Game 2	Game 3
Fullback	Robbie O'Davis	Wendell Sailor	
Wing	Brett Dallas		
Centre	Steve Renouf		
Centre	Matt Sing	Mark Coyne	
Wing	Wendell Sailor	Matt Sing	Willie Carne
Five-Eighth	Jason Smith	Julian O'Neill	Dale Shearer
Halfback	Allan Langer	Allan Langer (c)	
Prop	Tony Hearn		
Hooker	Wayne Bartrim	Steve Walters	
Prop	Gary Larson	Andrew Gee	
Second Row	Trevor Gillmeister (c)	Gary Larson	
Second Row	Brad Thorn		
Lock	Billy Moore		
Interchange	Adrian Lam		
Interchange	Michael Hancock	Kevin Walters	Matt Sing
Interchange	Alan Cann	Jason Smith	
Interchange	Craig Greenhill	Owen Cunningham	

== 1997 Series ==
=== State of Origin ===
- Only Australian Rugby League players could play in the State of Origin series.

Position	Game 1	Game 2	Game 3
Fullback	Robbie O'Davis		
Wing	Brett Dallas		
Centre	Matt Sing	Stuart Kelly	Mark Coyne
Centre	Mark Coyne		Julian O'Neill
Wing	Danny Moore	Matt Sing	
Five-Eighth	Ben Ikin		
Halfback	Adrian Lam (c)		
Prop	Neil Tierney		Clinton O'Brien
Hooker	Jamie Goddard	Wayne Bartrim	Jamie Goddard
Prop	Craig Smith		Neil Tierney
Second Row	Gary Larson		
Second Row	Billy Moore	Jason Smith	
Lock	Wayne Bartrim	Billy Moore	
Interchange	Jason Smith	Jamie Goddard	Stuart Kelly
Interchange	Jeremy Schloss		
Interchange	Tony Hearn	Clinton O'Brien	Craig Smith
Interchange	Stuart Kelly	Julian O'Neill	Wayne Bartrim

=== Tri-Series ===
- Only Super League players could play in the Super League Tri-series.

Position	Game 1 (versus NSW)	Game 2 (versus NZ)	Game 3 (versus NSW)
Fullback	Julian O'Neill	Darren Lockyer	
Wing	Mat Rogers		
Centre	Steve Renouf	Darren Smith	Steve Renouf
Centre	Geoff Bell	Tonie Carroll	
Wing	Wendell Sailor		
Five-Eighth	Kevin Walters		
Halfback	Allan Langer (c)		
Prop	Brad Thorn		
Hooker	Steve Walters		
Prop	Andrew Gee	Craig Greenhill	Owen Cunningham
Second Row	Owen Cunningham		Peter Ryan
Second Row	Gorden Tallis		
Lock	Darren Smith	Peter Ryan	Darren Smith
Interchange	Peter Ryan	Michael Hancock	
Interchange	Chris McKenna	Kevin Campion	
Interchange	Paul Green		
Interchange	Shane Webcke		

== 1998 Series ==
Position	Game 1	Game 2	Game 3
Fullback	Darren Lockyer		
Wing	Wendell Sailor		
Centre	Steve Renouf		
Centre	Darren Smith		Ben Ikin
Wing	Matt Sing		Robbie O'Davis
Five-Eighth	Kevin Walters		
Halfback	Allan Langer (c)		
Prop	Shane Webcke		
Hooker	Jason Hetherington		Jamie Goddard
Prop	Gary Larson		
Second Row	Wayne Bartrim	Brad Thorn	Jason Smith
Second Row	Jason Smith	Gorden Tallis	
Lock	Peter Ryan	Wayne Bartrim	Darren Smith
Interchange	Martin Lang		Matt Sing
Interchange	Steve Price		
Interchange	Ben Ikin		Peter Ryan
Interchange	Tonie Carroll		Andrew Gee

== 1999 Series ==
Position	Game 1	Game 2	Game 3
Fullback	Robbie O'Davis		Darren Lockyer
Wing	Mat Rogers		Robbie O'Davis
Centre	Darren Smith	Matt Sing	Tonie Carroll
Centre	Matt Sing	Darren Smith	
Wing	Wendell Sailor		
Five-Eighth	Kevin Walters	Kevin Walters (c)	Ben Ikin
Halfback	Adrian Lam (c)	Paul Green	Adrian Lam (c)
Prop	Shane Webcke		
Hooker	Jason Hetherington		
Prop	Craig Greenhill		
Second Row	Gorden Tallis		
Second Row	Chris McKenna		
Lock	Jason Smith		
Interchange	Ben Ikin		Paul Green
Interchange	Steve Price		
Interchange	Tonie Carroll		Brad Thorn
Interchange	Martin Lang		

== 2000 Series ==
Position	Game 1	Game 2	Game 3
Fullback	Darren Lockyer		
Wing	Mat Rogers		
Centre	Paul Bowman		
Centre	Darren Smith		Matt Sing
Wing	Wendell Sailor	Matt Sing	Wendell Sailor
Five-Eighth	Ben Ikin	Julian O'Neill	Ben Ikin
Halfback	Adrian Lam (c)		
Prop	Shane Webcke		
Hooker	Jason Hetherington		
Prop	Martin Lang		
Second Row	Gorden Tallis		
Second Row	Brad Thorn		Chris McKenna
Lock	Jason Smith		
Interchange	Paul Green		Julian O'Neill
Interchange	Tonie Carroll		Brad Thorn
Interchange	Russell Bawden		Tonie Carroll
Interchange	Steve Price		Craig Greenhill

== 2001 Series ==
Position	Game 1	Game 2	Game 3
Fullback	Darren Lockyer	Darren Lockyer (c)	
Wing	Lote Tuqiri		
Centre	Darren Smith		Chris Walker
Centre	Paul Bowman		
Wing	Wendell Sailor		
Five-Eighth	Daniel Wagon		
Halfback	Paul Green		Allan Langer
Prop	Shane Webcke		
Hooker	Kevin Campion		Paul Green
Prop	John Buttigieg	Russell Bawden	John Buttigieg
Second Row	Gorden Tallis (c)	Dane Carlaw	Brad Meyers
Second Row	Petero Civoniceva		
Lock	Brad Meyers		Darren Smith
Interchange	Chris Walker		Kevin Campion
Interchange	Chris Beattie		Dane Carlaw
Interchange	Carl Webb		
Interchange	John Doyle	Nathan Fien	John Doyle

== 2002 Series ==
Position	Game 1	Game 2	Game 3
Fullback	Darren Lockyer		
Wing	Lote Tuqiri		
Centre	Chris McKenna		
Centre	Darren Smith	Chris Walker	
Wing	Clinton Schifcofske	Justin Hodges	Robbie O'Davis
Five-Eighth	Shaun Berrigan		
Halfback	Allan Langer		
Prop	Shane Webcke		
Hooker	Kevin Campion	PJ Marsh	
Prop	John Buttigieg	Chris Beattie	Petero Civoniceva
Second Row	Gorden Tallis (c)		
Second Row	Petero Civoniceva	Dane Carlaw	
Lock	Dane Carlaw	Darren Smith	
Interchange	Chris Walker	Travis Norton	
Interchange	John Doyle	Steve Price	
Interchange	Carl Webb	Chris Flannery	Brent Tate
Interchange	Andrew Gee		

== 2003 Series ==
Position	Game 1	Game 2	Game 3
Fullback	Darren Lockyer		
Wing	Shannon Hegarty		
Centre	Brent Tate		
Centre	Justin Hodges	Tonie Carroll	Josh Hannay
Wing	Matt Sing		
Five-Eighth	Ben Ikin		
Halfback	Shaun Berrigan		
Prop	Shane Webcke		
Hooker	PJ Marsh	Michael Crocker	Cameron Smith
Prop	Petero Civoniceva	Steve Price	Petero Civoniceva
Second Row	Gorden Tallis (c)		
Second Row	Dane Carlaw	Petero Civoniceva	Dane Carlaw
Lock	Tonie Carroll	Dane Carlaw	Tonie Carroll
Interchange	Steve Price	Travis Norton	Steve Price
Interchange	Andrew Gee		Travis Norton
Interchange	Paul Bowman	Scott Sattler	Michael Crocker
Interchange	Chris Flannery	Matt Bowen	

== 2004 Series ==
Position	Game 1	Game 2	Game 3
Fullback	Rhys Wesser		
Wing	Justin Hodges	Matt Sing	
Centre	Paul Bowman		Brent Tate
Centre	Brent Tate	Willie Tonga	
Wing	Billy Slater		
Five-Eighth	Chris Flannery	Darren Lockyer (c)	
Halfback	Scott Prince		
Prop	Shane Webcke (c)	Shane Webcke	
Hooker	Cameron Smith		
Prop	Steve Price		
Second Row	Michael Crocker	Petero Civoniceva	Michael Crocker
Second Row	Dane Carlaw		
Lock	Tonie Carroll		Chris Flannery
Interchange	Ben Ross		
Interchange	Matt Bowen		
Interchange	Petero Civoniceva	Chris Flannery	Petero Civoniceva
Interchange	Travis Norton	Corey Parker	

== 2005 Series ==
Position	Game 1	Game 2	Game 3
Fullback	Billy Slater		Matt Bowen
Wing	Ty Williams		
Centre	Shaun Berrigan		
Centre	Paul Bowman		
Wing	Matt Sing		
Five-Eighth	Darren Lockyer (c)		
Halfback	Johnathan Thurston		
Prop	Steve Price	Brad Thorn	Danny Nutley
Hooker	Cameron Smith		
Prop	Petero Civoniceva		
Second Row	Michael Crocker		
Second Row	Brad Thorn	Carl Webb	Brad Thorn
Lock	Chris Flannery		
Interchange	Ben Ross		
Interchange	Carl Webb	Dane Carlaw	Corey Parker
Interchange	Casey McGuire		Ashley Harrison
Interchange	Matt Bowen		Tonie Carroll

== 2006 Series ==
Position	Game 1	Game 2	Game 3
Fullback	Matt Bowen	Karmichael Hunt	Clinton Schifcofske
Wing	Steven Bell		Rhys Wesser
Centre	Justin Hodges		Josh Hannay
Centre	Brent Tate		
Wing	Greg Inglis	Adam Mogg	
Five-Eighth	Darren Lockyer (c)		
Halfback	Johnathan Thurston		
Prop	Steve Price		
Hooker	Cameron Smith		
Prop	Petero Civoniceva		
Second Row	David Stagg	Nate Myles	
Second Row	Matthew Scott	Carl Webb	
Lock	Dallas Johnson		
Interchange	Shaun Berrigan		
Interchange	Carl Webb	Chris Flannery	
Interchange	Sam Thaiday		
Interchange	Nate Myles	Jacob Lillyman	Tonie Carroll

== 2007 Series ==
Position	Game 1	Game 2	Game 3
Fullback	Karmichael Hunt		
Wing	Brent Tate		
Centre	Justin Hodges		
Centre	Steven Bell		
Wing	Greg Inglis		
Five-Eighth	Darren Lockyer (c)		
Halfback	Johnathan Thurston		
Prop	Petero Civoniceva		
Hooker	Cameron Smith		
Prop	Steve Price		
Second Row	Tonie Carroll		
Second Row	Nate Myles	Carl Webb	
Lock	Dallas Johnson		
Interchange	Shaun Berrigan		
Interchange	Jacob Lillyman		Matt Bowen
Interchange	Neville Costigan		Dane Carlaw
Interchange	Antonio Kaufusi	Nate Myles	

== 2008 series ==
Position	Game 1	Game 2	Game 3
Fullback	Billy Slater	Karmichael Hunt	
Wing	Brent Tate	Darius Boyd	
Centre	Greg Inglis		
Centre	Justin Hodges	Brent Tate	
Wing	Israel Folau		
Five-Eighth	Karmichael Hunt	Johnathan Thurston	
Halfback	Johnathan Thurston	Scott Prince	
Prop	Carl Webb	Steve Price	
Hooker	Cameron Smith (c)		
Prop	Petero Civoniceva		
Second Row	Michael Crocker		Nate Myles
Second Row	Sam Thaiday	Ashley Harrison	
Lock	Dallas Johnson		
Interchange	PJ Marsh	Billy Slater	
Interchange	Jacob Lillyman	Sam Thaiday	
Interchange	Ben Hannant		
Interchange	Nate Myles		Michael Crocker

== 2009 Series ==
Position	Game 1	Game 2	Game 3
Fullback	Billy Slater		
Wing	Darius Boyd		
Centre	Greg Inglis		
Centre	Justin Hodges	Willie Tonga	Justin Hodges
Wing	Israel Folau		Willie Tonga
Five-Eighth	Darren Lockyer (C)		
Halfback	Johnathan Thurston		
Prop	Steve Price		
Hooker	Cameron Smith		
Prop	Petero Civoniceva		Matthew Scott
Second Row	Ashley Harrison		
Second Row	Sam Thaiday		
Lock	Dallas Johnson		
Interchange	Karmichael Hunt		
Interchange	Ben Hannant		Neville Costigan
Interchange	Nate Myles		David Shillington
Interchange	Michael Crocker		

== 2010 series ==
Position	Game 1	Game 2	Game 3
Fullback	Billy Slater		
Wing	Darius Boyd		
Centre	Greg Inglis		
Centre	Willie Tonga		
Wing	Israel Folau		
Five-Eighth	Darren Lockyer (c)		
Halfback	Johnathan Thurston		
Prop	Matt Scott		
Hooker	Matt Ballin	Cameron Smith	
Prop	Petero Civoniceva	David Shillington	Petero Civoniceva
Second Row	Nate Myles		
Second Row	Sam Thaiday		
Lock	Ashley Harrison		
Interchange	Cooper Cronk		
Interchange	Neville Costigan		
Interchange	David Shillington	Ben Hannant	David Shillington
Interchange	Dave Taylor		

== 2011 series ==
Position	Game 1	Game 2	Game 3
Fullback	Billy Slater		
Wing	Darius Boyd		
Centre	Dane Nielsen		Justin Hodges
Centre	Willie Tonga	Greg Inglis	
Wing	Jharal Yow Yeh		
Five-Eighth	Darren Lockyer (c)		
Halfback	Johnathan Thurston		
Prop	Matthew Scott		
Hooker	Cameron Smith		
Prop	Petero Civoniceva		
2nd Row	Nate Myles		
2nd Row	Sam Thaiday		
Lock	Ashley Harrison		
Interchange	Cooper Cronk		
Interchange	Corey Parker		
Interchange	Jacob Lillyman	David Taylor	Jacob Lillyman
Interchange	Ben Hannant		
18th Man	David Taylor	Jacob Lillyman	Dane Nielsen
Coach	Mal Meninga		

== 2012 series ==
Position	Game 1	Game 2	Game 3
Fullback	Billy Slater		Greg Inglis ^{2}
Wing	Darius Boyd		
Centre	Greg Inglis		Dane Nielsen
Centre	Justin Hodges		
Wing	Brent Tate		
Five-eighth	Johnathan Thurston		
Halfback	Cooper Cronk		
Prop forward	Matthew Scott		
Hooker	Cameron Smith (c)		
Prop	Petero Civoniceva		
2nd-row	Nate Myles		
2nd-row	Sam Thaiday	David Taylor ^{1}	Sam Thaiday
Lock	Ashley Harrison		Corey Parker
Interchange	Matt Gillett		
Interchange	David Taylor	Corey Parker	Ben Te'o
Interchange	Ben Hannant		
Interchange	David Shillington		
Coach	Mal Meninga		
18th man	Daly Cherry-Evans	Dallas Johnson	Matt Bowen
19th man	Dane Nielson	Ben Barba	Dave Taylor

1 - Sam Thaiday was originally selected to play but withdrew due to a shoulder injury. He was replaced by interchange forward David Taylor whilst Corey Parker was called onto the bench.
2 - Billy Slater was originally selected to play but withdrew due to a knee injury sustained during Game II. He was replaced by Greg Inglis whilst Dane Nielson came into the centres for Inglis.

== 2013 series ==
Position	Game 1	Game 2	Game 3
Fullback	Billy Slater		
Wing	Darius Boyd		
Centre	Greg Inglis		
Centre	Justin Hodges		
Wing	Brent Tate		
Five-Eighth	Johnathan Thurston		
Halfback	Cooper Cronk		
Prop	Matt Scott		
Hooker	Cameron Smith (c)		
Prop	David Shillington	Nate Myles	
Second row	Nate Myles	Chris McQueen	
Second row	Sam Thaiday		
Lock	Ashley Harrison	Corey Parker	
Interchange	Corey Parker	Daly Cherry-Evans	
Interchange	Matt Gillett		
Interchange	Ben Te'o		
Interchange	Chris McQueen	Josh Papalii	
Coach	Mal Meninga		
18th Man	Daly Cherry-Evans	Jacob Lillyman^{1}	
19th Man	Josh Papalii		

1 - Martin Kennedy was originally selected as 18th man in game two but withdrew due to injury. He was replaced by Jacob Lillyman.

== 2014 series ==
Position	Game 1	Game 2	Game 3
Fullback	Billy Slater		
Wing	Darius Boyd		
Centre	Greg Inglis		
Centre	Justin Hodges		
Wing	Brent Tate		Will Chambers
Five-eighth	Johnathan Thurston		
Halfback	Cooper Cronk	Daly Cherry-Evans	Cooper Cronk
Prop	Matt Scott		Jacob Lillyman
Hooker	Cameron Smith (c)		
Prop	Nate Myles		
Second row	Chris McQueen ^{1}	Aidan Guerra	
Second row	Matt Gillett		Sam Thaiday
Lock	Corey Parker	Sam Thaiday	Corey Parker
Interchange	Daly Cherry-Evans	Jacob Lillyman	Daly Cherry-Evans
Interchange	Ben Te'o		
Interchange	Aidan Guerra	Chris McQueen	Matt Gillett
Interchange	Josh Papalii	Dave Taylor	
Coach	Mal Meninga		
18th Man	Will Chambers	Ben Hunt	Josh McGuire
19th Man	Jake Friend		Michael Morgan

1 - The number 11 jumper was rested in honour of Arthur Beetson in Game One, which marked the 100th State Of Origin game, with Chris McQueen wearing the number 18 jumper. Playing at prop forward, Beetson captained Queensland in the first ever State of Origin game at Lang Park in 1980 and wore the number 11 jumper.

== 2015 series ==
Position	Game 1	Game 2	Game 3
Fullback	Billy Slater		Greg Inglis
Wing	Darius Boyd		
Centre	Greg Inglis		Will Chambers
Centre	Justin Hodges		
Wing	Will Chambers		Dane Gagai
Five-eighth	Johnathan Thurston		
Halfback	Cooper Cronk	Daly Cherry-Evans	Cooper Cronk
Prop	Matt Scott		
Hooker	Cameron Smith (c)		
Prop	Nate Myles		
Second row	Aidan Guerra		
Second row	Sam Thaiday		
Lock	Corey Parker		
Interchange	Michael Morgan^{1}		
Interchange	Josh McGuire		Josh Papalii
Interchange	Matt Gillett		
Interchange	Jacob Lillyman		
Coach	Mal Meninga		
18th Man	Dylan Napa	Josh Papalii	Edrick Lee
19th Man	Dane Gagai		
20th Man		Korbin Sims	

1 - Daly Cherry-Evans was originally selected to play in game one but withdrew due to injury. He was replaced by Michael Morgan, then Morgan retained his spot on the bench in Game II and III.

== 2016 series ==
Position	Game 1	Game 2	Game 3
Fullback	Darius Boyd		
Wing	Corey Oates		
Centre	Greg Inglis		
Centre	Justin O'Neill		
Wing	Dane Gagai		
Five-eighth	Johnathan Thurston		
Halfback	Cooper Cronk		
Prop	Matt Scott		
Hooker	Cameron Smith (c)		
Prop	Nate Myles	Josh McGuire	Nate Myles
Second row	Matt Gillett		
Second row	Sam Thaiday		
Lock	Corey Parker		
Interchange	Michael Morgan		Gavin Cooper
Interchange	Josh McGuire	Jacob Lillyman	Josh McGuire
Interchange	Aidan Guerra		
Interchange	Josh Papalii		Jacob Lillyman
Coach	Kevin Walters		
18th man	Jacob Lillyman	Ethan Lowe	Felise Kaufusi
19th man	Gavin Cooper		

== 2017 series ==
Position	Game 1	Game 2	Game 3
Fullback	Darius Boyd	Billy Slater	
Wing	Corey Oates	Valentine Holmes	
Centre	Will Chambers	Darius Boyd	Michael Morgan
Centre	Justin O'Neill	Will Chambers	
Wing	Dane Gagai		
Five-eighth	Anthony Milford	Johnathan Thurston	Cameron Munster
Halfback	Cooper Cronk		
Prop	Dylan Napa		
Hooker	Cameron Smith (c)		
Prop	Nate Myles	Jarrod Wallace	
Second row	Josh Papalii	Gavin Cooper	
Second row	Matt Gillett		
Lock	Josh McGuire		
Interchange	Michael Morgan		Ben Hunt
Interchange	Sam Thaiday	Josh Papalii	
Interchange	Aidan Guerra	Coen Hess	
Interchange	Jacob Lillyman	Tim Glasby	
Coach	Kevin Walters		
18th man	Jarrod Wallace	Cameron Munster	Felise Kaufusi

== 2018 series ==
Position	Game 1	Game 2	Game 3
Fullback	Michael Morgan	Billy Slater	Billy Slater (c)
Wing	Valentine Holmes		
Centre	Greg Inglis (c)		Dane Gagai
Centre	Will Chambers		
Wing	Dane Gagai		Corey Oates
Five-eighth	Cameron Munster		
Halfback	Ben Hunt		Daly Cherry-Evans
Prop	Dylan Napa		Jai Arrow
Hooker	Andrew McCullough		
Prop	Jarrod Wallace		Josh Papalii
Second row	Gavin Cooper		
Second row	Felise Kaufusi		
Lock	Josh McGuire		
Interchange	Anthony Milford	Kalyn Ponga	Ben Hunt
Interchange	Josh Papalii		Jarrod Wallace
Interchange	Coen Hess		
Interchange	Jai Arrow		Tim Glasby
Coach	Kevin Walters		

== 2019 series ==
Position	Game 1	Game 2	Game 3
Fullback	Kalyn Ponga		Cameron Munster
Wing	Corey Oates		
Centre	Michael Morgan		Moses Mbye
Centre	Will Chambers		
Wing	Dane Gagai		
Five-eighth	Cameron Munster		Corey Norman
Halfback	Daly Cherry-Evans (c)		
Prop	Jai Arrow	Dylan Napa	Joe Ofahengaue
Hooker	Ben Hunt		
Prop	Josh Papalii		
Second row	Felise Kaufusi		
Second row	Matt Gillett		Ethan Lowe
Lock	Josh McGuire		
Interchange	Moses Mbye		Michael Morgan
Interchange	Joe Ofahengaue	Jarrod Wallace	Christian Welch
Interchange	Dylan Napa	Tim Glasby	
Interchange	David Fifita		
Coach	Kevin Walters		

== 2020 series ==
Position	Game 1	Game 2	Game 3
Fullback	AJ Brimson	Valentine Holmes	Corey Allan
Wing	Xavier Coates		Edrick Lee
Centre	Kurt Capewell		Brenko Lee
Centre	Dane Gagai		
Wing	Phillip Sami		Valentine Holmes
Five-eighth	Cameron Munster		
Halfback	Daly Cherry-Evans (c)		
Prop	Christian Welch	Dunamis Lui	Christian Welch
Hooker	Jake Friend		
Prop	Josh Papalii		
Second row	Felise Kaufusi		
Second row	Coen Hess	Jaydn Su'A	Kurt Capewell
Lock	Tino Fa'asuamaleaui		
Interchange	Ben Hunt		Harry Grant
Interchange	Lindsay Collins		
Interchange	Jai Arrow		
Interchange	Jaydn Su'A	Moeaki Fotuaika	Jaydn Su'A
Coach	Wayne Bennett		

== 2021 series ==
Position	Game 1	Game 2	Game 3
Fullback	Valentine Holmes		Kalyn Ponga
Wing	Xavier Coates		Valentine Holmes
Centre	Kurt Capewell		Dane Gagai
Centre	Dane Gagai		Hamiso Tabuai-Fidow
Wing	Kyle Feldt		Xavier Coates
Five-eighth	Cameron Munster		
Halfback	Daly Cherry-Evans (c)		
Prop	Christian Welch		
Hooker	Harry Grant	Andrew McCullough	Ben Hunt
Prop	Tino Fa'asuamaleaui	Josh Papalii	
Second row	Felise Kaufusi	Jai Arrow	Kurt Capewell
Second row	David Fifita	Felise Kaufusi	
Lock	Jai Arrow	Tino Fa'asuamaleaui	
Interchange	AJ Brimson	Ben Hunt	AJ Brimson
Interchange	Jaydn Su'A	Moeaki Fotuaika	Thomas Flegler
Interchange	Moeaki Fotuaika	David Fifita	Moeaki Fotuaika
Interchange	Joe Ofahengaue	Francis Molo	
Coach	Paul Green		
18th man	Ben Hunt	Coen Hess	Kurt Mann

== 2022 series ==
Position	Game 1	Game 2	Game 3
Fullback	Kalyn Ponga		
Wing	Selwyn Cobbo		
Centre	Valentine Holmes		
Centre	Dane Gagai		
Wing	Xavier Coates	Murray Taulagi	Corey Oates
Five-eighth	Cameron Munster		Tom Dearden
Halfback	Daly Cherry-Evans (c)		
Prop	Tino Fa'asuamaleaui	Lindsay Collins	
Hooker	Ben Hunt		
Prop	Josh Papalii		
Second row	Kurt Capewell		
Second row	Felise Kaufusi		Jeremiah Nanai
Lock	Reuben Cotter	Tino Fa'asuamaleaui	Patrick Carrigan
Interchange	Harry Grant		
Interchange	Lindsay Collins	Jai Arrow	
Interchange	Patrick Carrigan		Tino Fa'asuamaleaui
Interchange	Jeremiah Nanai		Tom Gilbert
Coach	Billy Slater		
18th man	Jai Arrow	Tom Dearden	Thomas Flegler
