= 1992 State of Origin series =

Australian rugby league series

- Won by: New South Wales (4th title)
- Series margin: 2 - 1
- Points scored: 49
- Attendance: 113,417 (ave. 37,806 per match)
- Top points scorer(s): Rod Wishart (10 points)

The 1992 State of Origin series saw the 11th time that the annual three-game series between the New South Wales and Queensland representative rugby league football teams was contested entirely under "state of origin" selection rules. It was the first year of involvement by New South Wales' most successful coach Phil Gould, who made only four player changes to the Blues squad during the series - one of these necessitated by the return from injury of champion play-maker Ricky Stuart. For the first time in thirteen years of Origin there was no involvement by Wally Lewis to inspire Queensland.

== Games ==
=== Game I ===
Wednesday, 6 May 1992

New South Wales	14–6	Queensland
(6 - 3 g) Rod Wishart (4 - 1 t) Bradley Clyde (4 - 1 t) Craig Salvatori	(Report)	Allan Langer (4 - 1 t); Mal Meninga (2 - 1 g)

Sydney Football Stadium
Attendance: 40,039
Referee: David Manson
Player of the Match: Ben Elias

Game I was a battle of attrition with a high casualty rate. Blues hooker Benny Elias spent time in the blood bin after copping a head gash which needed 10 stitches to close, Queensland second-rower Gary Larson left the field on a stretcher and Maroons prop Steve Jackson suffered severe concussion early in the match.

The Blues scored first from a planned move designed by Gould to enable Blues lock Bradley Clyde to encounter Mal Meninga one-on-one. Gould was convinced that Meninga's reduced lateral movement across field in defence was a weakness in the Queensland side. He devised a move that would isolate Meninga and which led to Clyde easily standing up his Canberra teammate to score in the corner.

New South Wales' front-rowers Glenn Lazarus and Paul Harragon slowly began to take control of the rucks and after winger Rod Wishart kicked a penalty goal midway through the second half, replacement forward Craig Salvatori scored a crucial Blues try. In a match with so few scoring opportunities, the Blues' eight-point lead was sufficient to enable them to close out the match.

Clyde went off injured after scoring the first try and Laurie Daley knocked himself out in the in-goal just after half-time. Ben Elias returned in the second-half his face smeared with blood and a red-stained bandage around his head to take over as captain due to Daley's departure and to protect the Blues' lead. This led to one of Origin's enduring images when photographers and broadcast cameramen captured shots after the final siren of Elias' mother Barbara on the field and working around interviewers, mopping up the still flowing blood from her son's forehead as he spoke post-match.

=== Game II ===
Wednesday, 20 May 1992

Queensland	5–4	New South Wales
(4 - 1 t) Billy Moore (1 - 1 fg) Allan Langer	(Report)	Rod Wishart (4 - 2 g)

Lang Park
Attendance: 31,500
Referee: Bill Harrigan
Player of the Match: Bob Lindner

In game II, early in the match prop Martin Bella and five-eighth Peter Jackson were sent to the sin-bin for back-chatting referee Bill Harrigan and the Maroons were reduced to 11 men for ten minutes. A minute after Queensland were restored to their full complement, lock Billy Moore on debut, slipped through to score an unconverted try.

Two penalty goals to Rod Wishart levelled the scores before half time and as the minutes ticked by after the break it appeared the match was headed for the first draw in 35 Origin contests. It was wet and greasy in the second half and scoring chances were minimal with both sides maintaining impregnable defences. Ricky Stuart missed with two late attempts at field goal and then with just 66 seconds remaining, a complete lack of urgency from the Blues defensive line saw Queensland halfback Allan Langer land a wobbly field goal (the first of his career) from close range to steal a 5-4 victory for the home side.

=== Game III ===
Wednesday, 3 June 1992

New South Wales	16–4	Queensland
(4 - 1 t) Ricky Stuart (4 - 1 t) Andrew Ettingshausen (4 - 1 t) John Cartwright (4 - 2 g) Tim Brasher	(Report)	Mal Meninga (4 - 2 g)

Sydney Football Stadium
Attendance: 41,878
Referee: Eddie Ward
Player of the Match: Ricky Stuart

In the Game III decider of 1992 New South Wales led 4-2 at half-time when 21-year-old Balmain Tigers centre Tim Brasher replaced injured Blues winger Rod Wishart. Brasher immediately injected his team with a shot of enthusiasm with a series of lightning bursts from dummy-half that helped build their momentum.

The first try was scored by Ricky Stuart who went over from a rehearsed move in the 14th minute. Blues fullback Andrew Ettingshausen next scored the try of the series midway through the second half following a Laurie Daley grubber-kick. It came after Elias went to the blind side from the play-the-ball, and passed to Daley who kicked. Centre Paul McGregor got to the ball first, stepped past a tackler and found Daley backing up, who gave the ball to Ettingshausen who scored for 8-4. Finally second-rower John Cartwright barged across the line from close range to open up a 16-4 lead.

Queensland's efforts to strike back in the final 10 minutes were thwarted by two desperate tackles from Brasher, the first on a runaway Mark Coyne and the second a stunning ball-and-all effort on Mal Meninga, who threatened to score in the dying minutes.

== Teams ==
=== New South Wales ===
Position	Game 1	Game 2	Game 3
Fullback	Andrew Ettingshausen		
Wing	Graham Mackay		Chris Johns
Centre	Brad Fittler		
Centre	Paul McGregor		
Wing	Rod Wishart		
Five-Eighth	Laurie Daley (c)		
Halfback	John Simon	Ricky Stuart	
Prop	Glenn Lazarus		
Hooker	Ben Elias		
Prop	Paul Harragon		
Second Row	Paul Sironen		
Second Row	John Cartwright		
Lock	Bradley Clyde		
Interchange	Robbie McCormack	Steve Carter	Tim Brasher
Interchange	Craig Salvatori		
Interchange	Brad Mackay		
Interchange	David Gillespie		
Coach	Phil Gould		

=== Queensland ===
Position	Game 1	Game 2	Game 3
Fullback	Dale Shearer		
Wing	Michael Hancock		
Centre	Mal Meninga (c)		
Centre	Peter Jackson	Mark Coyne	
Wing	Willie Carne	Adrian Brunker	
Five-Eighth	Kevin Walters	Peter Jackson	
Halfback	Allan Langer		
Prop	Martin Bella		
Hooker	Steve Walters		
Prop	Steve Jackson	Gavin Allen	
Second Row	Bob Lindner		Mike McLean
Second Row	Trevor Gillmeister	Gary Larson	
Lock	Gary Larson	Billy Moore	
Interchange	Mark Coyne	Kevin Walters	
Interchange	Gary Coyne	Trevor Gillmeister	Darren Smith
Interchange	Steve Renouf	Darren Smith	Steve Jackson
Interchange	Gavin Allen	Mike McLean	Gary Coyne
Coach	Graham Lowe		

== See also ==
- 1992 NSWRL season

== Sources ==
- Big League's 25 Years of Origin Collectors' Edition, News Magazines, Surry Hills, Sydney
- Chesterton, Ray (1996) Good as Gould, Ironbark, Sydney
