= Peter Jackson (disambiguation) =

Peter Jackson (born 1961) is a New Zealand-born filmmaker.

Peter Jackson may also refer to:

== Academics ==
- Peter A. Jackson (born 1956), Australian writer and scholar of sexual politics and Buddhism in Thailand
- Peter Jackson (conservationist) (1926–2016), British journalist, photographer, tiger conservationist and author
- Peter Jackson (geographer) (born 1955), British human geographer
- Peter Jackson (historian), British scholar and historian, author on the history of the Crusades, in particular the Mongols
- Peter Jackson (scientist) (1949–2011), scientist at Thomson Reuters Corporation
- Peter Wyse Jackson (born 1955), Irish botanist

== Politics and law ==
- Peter Jackson (judge) (born 1955), English Court of Appeal judge
- Peter Jackson (politician) (1928–2020), British Labour Party Member of Parliament for High Peak 1966–1970

== Sports ==
=== Association football (soccer) ===
- Peter Jackson (footballer, born 1905) (1905–1986), English footballer and football manager
- Peter Jackson (footballer, born 1937) (1937–1991), his son, English footballer
- Peter Jackson (footballer, born 1961) (born 1961), English footballer and football manager

=== Boxing ===
- Peter Jackson (boxer) (1861–1901), Australian World Colored Heavyweight Champion boxer also known as "Peter the Great"
- Young Peter Jackson (boxer, born 1877) (1877–1923), American welterweight boxer known as "The Baltimore Demon"
- Young Peter Jackson (boxer, born 1912) (1912–1979), American lightweight boxer

=== Other sports ===
- Peter Jackson (cricketer) (1911–1999), English cricketer who played for Worcestershire
- Peter H. Jackson (1912–1983), English silver medallist in rowing at the 1936 Summer Olympics
- Peter Jackson (rugby union) (1930–2004), English rugby union footballer
- Peter Jackson (tennis) (1934–2014), Irish tennis player
- Peter Jackson (sailor) (born 1945), sailor for the U.S. Virgin Islands
- Peter Jackson (rugby league) (1964–1997), Australian rugby league footballer
- Peter Jackson (table tennis) (born 1964), New Zealand table tennis player

== Fiction ==
- Peter Jackson, a fictional character in the Stephen King novels Desperation and The Regulators
- Peter Jackson, a fictional character in the 1969 Michael Crichton novel The Andromeda Strain
- Peter Jackson, Cigar Merchant, a 1919 novel by Gilbert Frankau

== Others ==
- Peter Jackson, a pseudonym for Ernest Hemingway during his second stay in Toronto
- Peter Jackson (artist) (1922–2003), artist who ran a documentary cartoon strip in the London Evening News, giving glimpses of London's history
- Peter Jackson (journalist) (born 1950), American journalist
- Pete Jackson, American singer, songwriter, member of singing band Touch of Class
- Peter Jackson (fashion designer) (1928–2008), Australian men's fashion outfitter and fashion designer
- Peter Jackson, a brand of cigarettes owned by Imperial Tobacco
- Peter Jackson (British businessman) (born 1975), British businessman, CEO of Paddy Power Betfair
- Peter Jackson (Australian businessman) (born 1953), Australian businessman, former CEO of the Essendon and Melbourne football clubs
- Pete Jackson, British screenwriter of the TV series Somewhere Boy (2022) and The Death of Bunny Munro (2025)
