= Queensland rugby league team records =

This is a list of records in the State of Origin series for Queensland Maroons.

== Team records ==
=== Streaks ===
| Streak | Games | When |
|---|---|---|
| Longest winning streak | 8 | Game II, 1987 - Game III, 1989 |
| Longest losing streak | 5 | Game I, 1996 - Game II, 1997 |
| Longest series winning streak | 8 | 2006, 2007, 2008, 2009, 2010, 2011, 2012, 2013 |
Correct to Game 3, 2015 and excludes 1987 exhibition match

=== Series whitewashes ===
| Record | Number | When |
|---|---|---|
| 3-0 series whitewash victories | 4 | 1988, 1989, 1995, 2010 |
| 0-3 series whitewash losses | 3 | 1986, 1996, 2000 |
Correct to Game 3, 2015 and excludes 1987 exhibition match

=== Biggest win ===
| Margin | Score | Game |
|---|---|---|
| 46 | 52-6 | Game 3, 2015 |
| 44 | 50-6 | Game 1, 1989 |
Correct to Game 2, 2022 and excludes exhibition match

=== Biggest loss ===
| Margin | Score | Game |
|---|---|---|
| 44 | 6-50 | Game 1, 2021 |
| 40 | 16-56 | Game 3, 2000 |
| 32 | 6-38 | Game 2, 2019 |
| 32 | 12-44 | Game 2, 2022 |
| 28 | 4-32 | Game 1, 2002 |
Correct to Game 2, 2022 and excludes exhibition match

=== Most points scored in a game ===
| Points | Score | Game |
|---|---|---|
| 52 | 52-6 | Game 3, 2015 |
| 44 | 44-24 | Game 2, 2026 |
| 43 | 43-22 | Game 3, 1983 |
Correct to Game 3, 2015 and includes exhibition match

=== Most points conceded in a game ===
| Points | Score | Game |
|---|---|---|
| 56 | 16-56 | Game 3, 2000 |
| 50 | 6-50 | Game 1, 2021 |
| 44 | 12-44 | Game 2, 2022 |
| 38 | 6-38 | Game 2, 2019 |
| 36 | 14-36 | Game 3, 2004 |
| 32 | 4-32 | Game 1, 2002 |
Correct to Game 1 2023 and includes exhibition match

=== Most total points in a game (win) ===
| Points | Score | Game |
|---|---|---|
| 65 | 43-22 | Game 3, 1983 |
| 58 | 34-24 | Game 3, 2011 |
| 58 | 52-6 | Game 3, 2015 |
Correct to Game 3, 2015 and includes exhibition match

=== Most total points in a game (loss) ===
| Points | Score | Game |
|---|---|---|
| 72 | 16-56 | Game 3, 2000 |
| 56 | 6-50 | Game 1, 2021 |
| 54 | 22-32 | Game 2, 2005 |
| 50 | 14-36 | Game 3, 2004 |
Correct to Game 1, 2021 and includes exhibition match

=== Fewest points in a game (win) ===
| Points | Score | Game |
|---|---|---|
| 2 | 2-0 | Game 1, 1995 |
| 9 | 5-4 | Game 2, 1992 |
| 10 | 6-4 | Game 1, 1991 |
| 10 | 6-4 | Game 1, 2016 |
Correct to Game 1, 2016 and includes exhibition match

=== Fewest points in a game (loss) ===
| Points | Score | Game |
|---|---|---|
| 8 | 0-8 | Game 1, 1990 |
| 10 | 4-6 | Game 2, 2014 |
| 14 | 6-8 | Game 1, 1997 |
Correct to Game 3, 2015 and includes exhibition match

=== Biggest comeback ===
- 15 points.

Trailed New South Wales 15-0 after 30 minutes to win 22–15 in 1981 at Lang Park.

== Individual records ==
Players in bold are still active.

=== Most caps (25+) ===
| No. games | Player | Era |
|---|---|---|
| 42 | Cameron Smith | 2003–2017 |
| 37 | Johnathan Thurston | 2005–2017 |
| 36 | Darren Lockyer | 1998–2007, 2009–2011 |
| 34 | Allan Langer | 1987–1994, 1996, 1998, 2001–2002 |
| 33 | Petero Civoniceva | 2001–2012 |
| 32 | Greg Inglis | 2007–2016, 2018 |
| 32 | Mal Meninga | 1980–1986, 1989–1994 |
| 32 | Nate Myles | 2006–2017 |
| 31 | Wally Lewis | 1980–1991 |
| 31 | Billy Slater | 2004–2005, 2008–2015, 2017–2018 |
| 29 | Steve Price | 1998–2000, 2002–2009 |
| 29 | Sam Thaiday | 2006–2017 |
| 28 | Darius Boyd | 2008–2017 |
| 26 | Daly Cherry-Evans | 2013–2015, 2018–2025 |
| 26 | Dale Shearer | 1985–1987, 1989–1993, 1995–1996 |
| 25 | Bob Lindner | 1984–1993 |
Correct to Game 1, 2025 and includes exhibition match

=== Most points (40+) ===
| No. points | Player | Tries | Goals | Field goals |
|---|---|---|---|---|
| 220 | Johnathan Thurston | 5 | 99 | 2 |
| 161 | Mal Meninga | 6 | 69 | 0 |
| 154 | **Valentine Holmes** | 13 | 51 | 0 |
| 86 | Darren Lockyer | 10 | 22 | 2 |
| 72 | Greg Inglis | 18 | 0 | 0 |
| 66 | Dale Shearer | 12 | 9 | 0 |
| 68 | Darius Boyd | 17 | 0 | 0 |
| 58 | Cameron Smith | 5 | 19 | 0 |
| 48 | Gary Belcher | 4 | 16 | 0 |
| 48 | **Dane Gagai** | 12 | 0 | 0 |
| 48 | Billy Slater | 12 | 0 | 0 |
| 48 | Hamiso Tabuai-Fidow | 12 | 0 | 0 |
| 41 | Allan Langer | 10 | 0 | 1 |
Correct to Game 1, 2026 and includes exhibition match

=== Most tries (7+) ===
| No. tries | Player | No. games |
|---|---|---|
| 18 | Greg Inglis | 32 |
| 17 | Darius Boyd | 28 |
| 13 | **Valentine Holmes** | 21 |
| 12 | Dale Shearer | 26 |
| 12 | Billy Slater | 31 |
| 12 | **Dane Gagai** | 23 |
| 12 | **Hamiso Tabuai-Fidow** | 11 |
| 10 | Allan Langer | 34 |
| 9 | Darren Lockyer | 36 |
| 7 | Israel Folau | 8 |
| 7 | Wally Lewis | 31 |
| 7 | Bob Lindner | 25 |
Correct to Game 2, 2025 and includes exhibition match

=== Single match scoring records ===
| Record | Player | Detail | When |
|---|---|---|---|
| Most tries in a match | Kerry Boustead | 3 | Game 1, 1984 |
| | Lote Tuqiri | 3 | Game 2, 2002 |
| | Matt Sing | 3 | Game 3, 2003 |
| | Dane Gagai | 3 | Game 2, 2016 |
| | Valentine Holmes | 3 | Game 3, 2017 |
| | Hamiso Tabuai-Fidow | 3 | Game 1, 2024 |
| Most goals in a match | Johnathan Thurston | 9 | Game 3, 2015 |
| Most points in a match | Lote Tuqiri | 18 | Game 2, 2002 |
| | Johnathan Thurston | 18 | Game 3, 2015 |
| Most tries in a series | Lote Tuqiri | 5 | 2002 |
| Most goals in a series | Mal Meninga | 13 | 1983 |
| | Johnathan Thurston | 13 | 2015 |
| Most points in a series | Mal Meninga | 30 | 1983 |
Correct to Game 1, 2024 and includes exhibition match

=== Other records ===
| Record | Player | Detail | When |
|---|---|---|---|
| Youngest player | Ben Ikin | 18 years, 83 days | Game 1, 1995 |
| Oldest player | Daly Cherry-Evans | 36 years, 97 days | Game 1, 2025 |
| Most consecutive appearances | Johnathan Thurston | 36 games | Game 1, 2005 to Game 3, 2016 |
| Most appearances as captain | Wally Lewis | 30 games | 1981 to 1991 |
Correct to Game 1, 2025 and includes exhibition match

=== Attendance records ===
The largest home attendances for Qld State of Origin games are:

- Lang Park (1980–1993) - 33,662 - Game 1, 1984
- Suncorp Stadium (1994–2001) - 40,665 - Game 3, 1994
- ANZ Stadium (2001–2002) - 49,441 - Game 3, 2001
- Suncorp Stadium (2003–present) - 52,540 - Game 3, 2017
