= 2014 State of Origin series =

Australian rugby league series

- Won by: New South Wales (13th title)
- Series margin: 2-1
- Points scored: 26-44
- Attendance: 185,687 (ave. 61,896 per match)
- Player of the series: Paul Gallen
- Top points scorer(s): Johnathan Thurston – 16
- Top try scorer(s): Darius Boyd – 3

The 2014 State of Origin series was the 33rd time the annual best-of-three series between the Queensland and New South Wales rugby league teams has been played entirely under 'state of origin' rules (1980 and 1981 were only 1 game series). It is the second series to be administered by the Australian Rugby League Commission which was created in a major restructure of the sport's administration in Australia.

Originally, New South Wales were to host two home matches this year, however the ARLC Commission announced in November 2012 a new five-year cycle which would see Queensland instead host two home matches this year, as well as in 2017, the Blues to host two home matches in 2016 and the remaining match in 2015 to be hosted at a neutral venue (later named to be the 100,024 capacity Melbourne Cricket Ground).

Former Canberra, Queensland and Australian captain Mal Meninga remained as coach of the Queensland side, having won all eight previous editions dating back to 2006. New South Wales were coached by former Canberra, NSW and Australia captain Laurie Daley for a second consecutive year.

Consecutive victories over Queensland in the first and second games with respective scores of 12–8 and 6–4 have enabled New South Wales to finally conclude their opposition's eight year domination of uninterrupted Origin series victories. Additionally, with the exception of Luke Lewis, every player to have so far featured in this year's New South Wales squad have achieved their first ever series win. The Blues had the chance to record their first series clean sweep since 2000, however the Maroons won the final game 32–8 to reduce the final series margin to 2–1 in New South Wales' favour.

== Game I ==
Breaking usual tradition, the Queensland squad was announced before New South Wales. Changes to the team were largely minor with Matt Gillett earning his first promotion to the starting side to replace the injured Sam Thaiday in the second-row whilst Aidan Guerra from the Sydney Roosters makes his debut from the bench. The halves combination for New South Wales were once again modified, with Canterbury-Bankstown Bulldogs pairing Josh Reynolds and Trent Hodkinson (making his debut) replacing the Roosters and incumbent halves pairing of James Maloney and Mitchell Pearce. Pearce, who played in every game as halfback since the second match of the 2010 series and held the record for consecutive matches in the position, was omitted largely due to him being arrested at a Kings Cross nightclub for drunken misbehaviour. After missing out from the second and third games from last year due to injury, Jarryd Hayne returned to the side to reclaim his fullback role over Josh Dugan. Daniel Tupou will be the second debutant in the side to partner his Roosters team mate Michael Jennings on the left edge, with Brett Morris switching to the other side to be alongside his twin brother Josh. Beau Scott was recalled into the side in the starting second-row after being overlooked from last year's series. Joining the bench, fellow forward Tony Williams was also recalled due to improved form and likely combinations with his club team mate halves. Notable forced omissions from the squad were Greg Bird (suspension), Andrew Fifita (injury) and Boyd Cordner (injury).

Wednesday, 28 May 2014
8:00 pm

Queensland	8 – 12	New South Wales
Tries: Boyd (5', 57') 2 Goals: Thurston 0/2	Report	Tries: 1 (19') B Morris; 1 (33') Hayne; Goals: 2/4 Hodkinson (26' pen, 44' pen)

Suncorp Stadium, Brisbane
Attendance: 52,111
Referee: Shayne Hayne, Ben Cummins
Player of the Match: Jarryd Hayne

Queensland opened the scoring for the series with a try to winger Darius Boyd in the fifth minute. The attempted conversion from Johnathan Thurston, who only needed four points to surpass Mal Meninga as the highest pointscorer in Origin history, was unsuccessful; leaving the score 4–0 to the Maroons.

Shortly after, halfback Cooper Cronk left the field with a broken arm, and did not return for the match. This meant that interchange player Daly Cherry-Evans was brought on to replace Cronk, thus unsettling the Maroons' attacking structure. At 19 minutes, winger Brett Morris scored the Blues' first try, but appeared to suffer a shoulder injury in doing so. Another try to the Blues, through fullback Jarryd Hayne, saw the Blues lead the Maroons 10–4 at halftime.

Boyd scored the only try of the second half in the 57th minute, and was denied a third when former Dragons team-mate Morris tackled him just short of the try-line with five minutes remaining. Queensland continued to attack the New South Wales line in the final minutes; they had one last play after a penalty in the last few seconds, but desperate defence from the Blues ensured that they would win their first match in Brisbane since 2009 and first Game I in the city since 2003.

The Blues' victory set a new television viewership record for an opening State of Origin match, with 2.596 million metro viewers watching the match, with 1.23 million watching in Sydney alone. Total national viewership was 4.056 million.

In the aftermath of the Blues' victory, five-eighth Josh Reynolds was charged with a dangerous tackle on the Maroons' Brent Tate, but earned a successful downgrade at the judiciary, freeing him to play in Game II, while Brett Morris was later diagnosed with a fractured shoulder which has ruled him out for the entire series. Maroons halfback Cooper Cronk's arm injury resulted in a prognosis of up to twelve weeks, meaning his Origin series was already over.

== Game II ==
Heading into the second match of the series, Queensland had a host of injury concerns with Billy Slater, Greg Inglis and Daly Cherry-Evans all in significant doubt, whilst the man Cherry-Evans deputised for, Cooper Cronk, was suspected to be ruled out of the remainder of the series with a broken arm he suffered in the first game. As a result, Mal Meninga chose to carry 22 man squad into game two, where he would name Will Chambers, Ben Hunt, Jacob Lillyman, Anthony Milford and Willie Tonga as his reserves. Sam Thaiday returned from injury that ruled him of the first game to rejoin the starting forward pack. To further complicate matters, forwards Josh Papalii and Corey Parker would later rule themselves out with injury, forcing Meninga to announce David Taylor as another reserve. On game day, Slater, Inglis and Cherry-Evans would pass fitness to reprise their positions, with Thaiday named at lock and Aidan Guerra into the starting second row. Changes on the bench saw Taylor and Lilyman joining the demoted Chris McQueen.

Laurie Daley would have his own share of injury headaches, as twins and right side wing-centre pairing Brett Morris and Josh Morris were ultimately ruled out with injuries sustained from game one. Daley would choose Will Hopoate and Josh Dugan as the respective replacements, both players of whom debuted in 2011 as centre and fullback but were instead selected to play in unfamiliar positions. Unavailable for the first game due to suspension, Greg Bird returns to the side as lock, shifting Paul Gallen to the front row whilst James Tamou replaced Tony Williams on the interchange.

Wednesday, 18 June 2014
8:00pm

New South Wales	6 – 4	Queensland
Tries: Hodkinson (71') 1 Goals: Hodkinson (73') 1/1	Report	Tries: Goals: 2/2 Thurston (14' pen, 30' pen)

ANZ Stadium, Sydney
Attendance: 83,421
Referee: Shayne Hayne, Ben Cummins
Player of the Match: Paul Gallen

The first half was played with high intensity displayed from both sides, with the only points in the first half coming from two penalty goals to Maroons five-eighth Johnathan Thurston; those two successful penalty conversions saw him overtake his coach Mal Meninga as the highest pointscorer in State of Origin history. Nearing halftime, Blues five-eighth Josh Reynolds prevented a certain Maroons try by kicking the ball away from the Maroons' tryline.

Sam Thaiday appeared to have scored the first try of the match for the Maroons in the 51st minute, only for the replay to show that he had lost possession of the ball whilst trying to ground the ball on the try-line thanks to a strong tackle from Jarryd Hayne. Following numerous handling mistakes from the Blues, halfback Trent Hodkinson then scored the only try of the match with seven minutes to go; his successful conversion seeing the team lead 6–4 entering the final five minutes. The game had controversy with the kick restart being declared by the referee to be out on the full providing NSW with a penalty from half way despite replays clearly showing the ball touching Aaron Woods which should have resulted in a NSW goal line drop out, providing QLD with an attacking opportunity.

Queensland were unable to score in the final five minutes, resulting in New South Wales clinching their first series victory since 2005 and sentencing Maroons coach Mal Meninga to his first and only Origin series defeat since taking over as coach of Queensland in 2006. The match result of 6–4 also resulted as the Maroons' first tryless defeat since 1999. As a result of the victory, a fireworks display was held at the Sydney Harbour Bridge.

The game also again saw the Origin Record for TV Ratings broken, with 2.682 million metro viewers and a national total of 4.159 million watching the match.

== Game III ==
Wednesday, 9 July 2014
8:15pm

Queensland	32 – 8	New South Wales
Tries: Smith (38') 1 Slater (44') 1 Boyd (72') 1 Guerra (74') 1 Cronk (78') 1 Goals: Thurston 6/6 (40', 46', 60' pen, 74', 76', 79')		Tries: 1 (61') Dugan; Goals: 2/2 Hodkinson (24' pen, 64')

Suncorp Stadium, Brisbane
Attendance: 50,155
Referee: Ben Cummins, Gerard Sutton
Player of the Match: Corey Parker

As had been the case in the first two matches, the first half was a defensive affair, with the first try not coming until just before half-time, when Cameron Smith pounced on a kick by Daly Cherry-Evans to score close to the posts with two minutes remaining. The successful conversion by Johnathan Thurston made the score 6–2 in favour of the Maroons at half-time.

At half-time, most of the former players who had taken part during Queensland's eight-year Origin reign were honoured.

The Maroons dominated in the second half, scoring four tries to one as they easily produced the best attacking performance of any state this series. Tries to Billy Slater, Darius Boyd, Aidan Guerra and Cooper Cronk pushed the final score out to 32–8. Josh Dugan scored the only try for the Blues, whose five-eighth Josh Reynolds was booked for a shoulder charge on Maroons winger Will Chambers in the second half.

Queensland's 32–8 Game III victory saw them outscore the Blues 44–26 across the three matches. Queensland's win also made Cameron Smith the first player in State of Origin history to win 20 games.

After both states completed their lap of honour post-match, Paul Gallen then became the first New South Wales captain since Danny Buderus in 2005 to raise the State of Origin shield. Gallen was also named the Wally Lewis Medallist for being the best player in the series, whilst Corey Parker was named by Channel Nine as the man-of-the-match.

== Teams ==
The 18th, 19th & 20th man are reserves to cover for any forthcoming injuries and, unless chosen, do not actually play.

=== New South Wales Blues ===
Position	Game 1	Game 2	Game 3
Fullback	Jarryd Hayne		
Wing	Brett Morris	Will Hopoate	James McManus
Centre	Josh Morris	Josh Dugan	
Centre	Michael Jennings		Josh Morris
Wing	Daniel Tupou		
Five-eighth	Josh Reynolds		
Halfback	Trent Hodkinson		
Prop	Aaron Woods		
Hooker	Robbie Farah		
Prop	James Tamou	Paul Gallen (c)	
Second row	Beau Scott		
Second row	Ryan Hoffman		
Lock	Paul Gallen (c)	Greg Bird	
Interchange	Trent Merrin		
Interchange	Anthony Watmough		Boyd Cordner
Interchange	Luke Lewis		
Interchange	Tony Williams	James Tamou	
Coach	Laurie Daley		
18th Man	Josh Jackson	Tony Williams	
19th Man	Will Hopoate		Jarrod Croker

=== Queensland Maroons ===
Position	Game 1	Game 2	Game 3
Fullback	Billy Slater		
Wing	Darius Boyd		
Centre	Greg Inglis		
Centre	Justin Hodges		
Wing	Brent Tate		Will Chambers
Five-eighth	Johnathan Thurston		
Halfback	Cooper Cronk	Daly Cherry-Evans	Cooper Cronk
Prop	Matt Scott		Jacob Lillyman
Hooker	Cameron Smith (c)		
Prop	Nate Myles		
Second row	Chris McQueen ^{1}	Aidan Guerra	
Second row	Matt Gillett		Sam Thaiday
Lock	Corey Parker	Sam Thaiday	Corey Parker
Interchange	Daly Cherry-Evans	Jacob Lillyman	Daly Cherry-Evans
Interchange	Ben Te'o		
Interchange	Aidan Guerra	Chris McQueen	Matt Gillett
Interchange	Josh Papalii	Dave Taylor	
Coach	Mal Meninga		
18th Man	Will Chambers	Ben Hunt	Josh McGuire
19th Man	Jake Friend		Michael Morgan

1 - The number 11 jumper was rested in honour of Arthur Beetson in Game One, which marked the 100th State Of Origin game, with Chris McQueen wearing the number 18 jumper. Playing at prop forward, Beetson captained Queensland in the first ever State of Origin game at Lang Park in 1980 and wore the number 11 jumper.

== Under-20s ==
New South Wales retained the Darren Lockyer Shield.

3 May 2014
18:00 (Local)

New South Wales	30 - 8	Queensland
Tries; Mamo 3 Phillips 1 Mata'utia 1 Goals; Gutherson 5/5	Report	Tries; Folau 1 Bateman 1 Goals; Milford 0/2

Centrebet Stadium, Penrith
Referee: Chris Sutton
Player of the Match: Jake Mamo

NSW: Clint Gutherson (Manly), Jake Mamo (Newcastle), Aaron Gray (South Sydney), Sione Mata'utia (Newcastle), Tyrone Phillips (Canterbury), Drew Hutchison (St George Illawarra), Mitchell Moses (Wests Tigers), Jake Trbojevic (Manly), Kaysa Pritchard (c) (Parramatta), Matthew Lodge (Wests Tigers), Jakiel Mariner (Sydney Roosters), Adam Elliott (Canterbury), Jack Bird (St George Illawarra). Res - Ryan Matterson (Parramatta), Pauli Pauli (Parramatta), Dean Britt (Melbourne), Rhys Kennedy (Canberra).

Qld: Valentine Holmes (Cronulla), Nene MacDonald (Sydney Roosters), Brenko Lee (Canberra), Brendan Elliot (Sydney Roosters), John Folau (Parramatta), Anthony Milford (c) (Canberra), Jaelen Feeney (Newcastle), Lloyd Perrett (Canterbury), Kieran Moseley (Penrith), Christian Welch (Melbourne), Brett Greinke (Brisbane), Patrick Mago (Canberra), Luke Bateman (Canberra). Res - Cameron Munster (Melbourne), Francis Molo (Brisbane), Ajuma Adams (Brisbane), Joe Ofahengaue (Brisbane).

== Women's State of Origin ==
2 May 2015
18:00 (Local)

New South Wales	v	Queensland

Centrebet Stadium, Penrith
