= Greg Bird (rugby league) =

Australian rugby league footballer

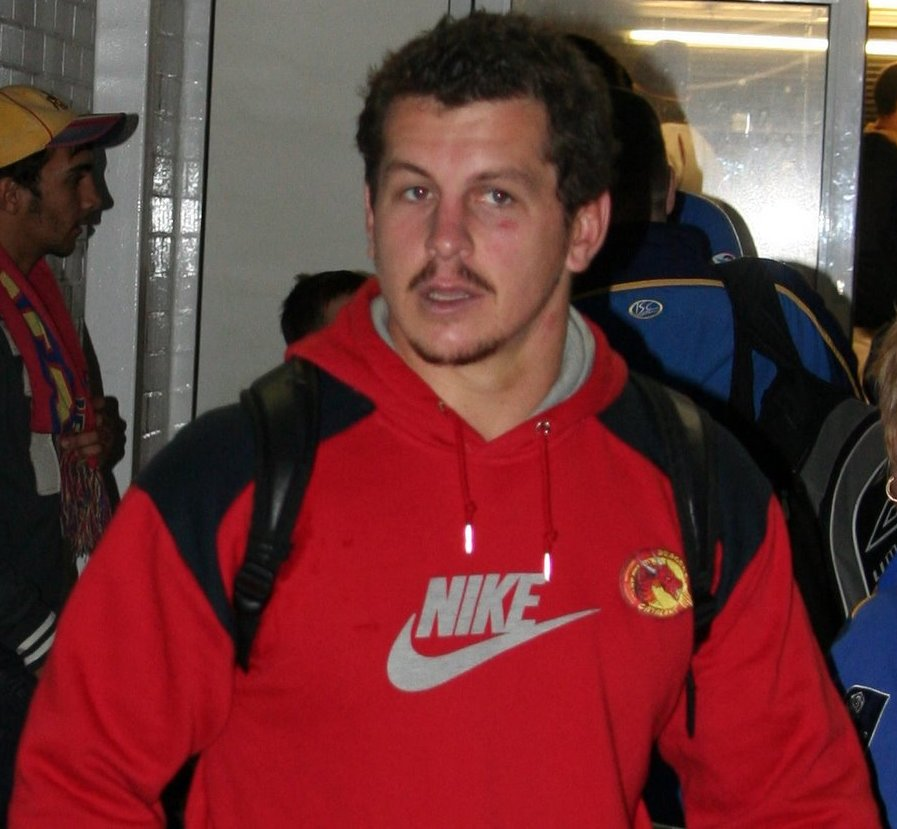

Personal information
- Full name: Gregory James Howard Bird
- Born: 10 February 1984 (age 42) Maitland, New South Wales, Australia

Playing information
- Height: 183 cm (6 ft 0 in)
- Weight: 103 kg (16 st 3 lb)
- Position: Lock, Second-row, Five-eighth
Club
Years	Team	Pld	T	G	FG	P
2002–08	Cronulla Sharks	106	35	6	0	152
2009	Catalans Dragons	23	5	3	0	26
2010–16	Gold Coast Titans	129	15	19	2	100
2017–19	Catalans Dragons	58	8	0	0	32
	Total	316	63	28	2	310
Representative
Years	Team	Pld	T	G	FG	P
2007–12	NSW Country	3	0	0	0	0
2007–16	New South Wales	18	2	0	0	8
2007–13	Prime Minister's XIII	3	0	0	0	0
2007–15	Australia	17	4	0	0	16
2010–15	Indigenous All Stars	5	0	0	0	0

Greg Bird (born 10 February 1984) is an Australian former professional rugby league footballer who played in the 2000s and 2010s. He played as a second-row, lock or five-eighth for Australia at international level.

Bird previously played for the NRL for the Cronulla-Sutherland Sharks and the Gold Coast Titans. He played for the Catalans Dragons in the Super League in two separate spells, having previously played for the French club in 2009. He is a NSW Country, New South Wales State of Origin, Prime Minister's XIII and Indigenous All Stars representative.

== Background ==
Bird was born in Maitland, New South Wales, Australia.

He played junior football for the West Maitland Red Dogs and Maitland Pumpkin Pickers before being signed by the Newcastle Knights. He played for the Knights' Harold Matthews and SG Ball teams before being signed by the Cronulla-Sutherland Sharks. In 2001, while playing for Rutherford Technology High School, Bird was selected for the Australian Schoolboys team and captained the side.

== Professional playing career ==
=== Cronulla-Sutherland Sharks ===
In round 7 of the 2002 NRL season, Bird made his NRL debut for the Cronulla-Sutherland Sharks against the Canterbury-Bankstown Bulldogs. In 2003, he became a regular first-grader for the Sharks.

In 2004, Bird obtained notoriety after kneeing South Sydney Rabbitohs wing Shane Marteene in the head during their round 4 clash, which resulted in him being sent off by the referee and being suspended from playing for 10 weeks. According to his agent, Gavin Orr, Bird had "said he copped a couple of blows to the face during the match and he got an elbow from Shane Marteene in the tackle and just lost it." Chief executive of the Cronulla-Sutherland Sharks, Steve Rogers, claimed that Bird had "been made an example of" and was angered that there "wasn't much consideration given to Greg's youth and his previous record". The judiciary stated that it took Bird's remorse and good record into account, but decided upon the lengthy suspension due to the severity of the offence. After the game Bird apologised to Marteene in the dressing rooms and also wrote letters to the player and the South Sydney Rabbitohs club.

In 2006, Bird posed for the Naked Rugby League 2007-08 charity calendar, which was produced to raise money for the National Breast Cancer Foundation of Australia.

In March 2006, Bird was alleged to have sent model Lara Bingle inappropriate text messages, although he denied this. Cronulla-Sutherland Sharks spokesman Rob Willis said "Greg's thrown up his hands. He says he's done nothing inappropriate. There's been nothing obscene written. There's been no harassment."

In 2006, Bird suffered a serious rib injury in round 21, against the Newcastle Knights, which ended his season. He was voted as the Sharks' player of the year, despite missing 7 games of the season through injury.

In May 2007, Bird was selected for the New South Wales Country Origin team in the annual City vs Country Origin match. In June 2007, Bird was selected for the New South Wales side to play Queensland in game 2 of the 2007 State of Origin series. His performance earned him a recall for game 3, this time at five-eighth. He was awarded the man of the match award. In September 2007, Bird was selected for the Prime Minister's XIII team to play Papua New Guinea. In October 2007, Bird was selected for Australia to play New Zealand in the one-off test match in Wellington, New Zealand. He scored a try on debut and was named the player's player.

In May 2008, Bird was selected for Australia in 2008 centenary test, retaining his five-eighth jersey in place of the injured Darren Lockyer. Bird was also selected for game 1 of the 2008 State of Origin series for New South Wales, controversially chosen again in the five-eighth position. He was named man of the match and was again selected in game 2. In August 2008, Bird was named in the preliminary 46-man Kangaroos squad for the 2008 Rugby League World Cup. However, he didn't play a game in the tournament.

On 25 August 2008, Bird appeared in the Sutherland Local Court charged with maliciously inflicting grievous bodily harm on his 24-year-old American girlfriend, Katie Milligan, at his flat in Cronulla. It was alleged that he had smashed a glass into her face. It was reported that she underwent surgery for a fractured eye socket and facial injuries. Bird was granted bail. The Cronulla-Sutherland Sharks chief executive, Tony Zappia, advised Bird that he would be stood down from the playing roster pending further investigation. Milligan had moved to Sydney to be with Bird earlier in the month, having met him in Las Vegas while he was on holiday there earlier in the year. In September 2008, Bird's legal representative was advised that Bird would be facing additional charges of public mischief and false accusation. The charges against Bird led to the British Government denying him a work permit to take up a playing position with Bradford Bulls.

On 17 January 2009, Bird signed a 1-year contract with the Bradford Bulls starting in the same year after being released from his contract with the Sharks the day before. However, he was unable to play for the Bulls as his visa was denied. After initially deciding to play rugby union for the Southern Districts Rugby Club in the Shute Shield, Bird eventually signed with French club the Catalans Dragons of the Super League.

=== Catalans Dragons ===
On 13 March 2009, Bird again appeared in the Sutherland Local Court on 5 charges; 1 charge with 4 backup charges, of common assault against another woman at Cronulla on 19 January 2008. This matter was not related to the case involving his girlfriend. His accuser was found to have been the aggressor in the incident and Bird was cleared of all charges by the magistrate. On 28 April 2009, he was found guilty of a count of reckless wounding of his girlfriend and another count of making a false accusation to police after attempting to blame his flatmate. On 6 May 2009, the Dragons opened talks with Bird about extending his contract with the club despite his court case on 28 April 2009 for assault. On 22 June 2009, he was sentenced to a maximum of 16 months imprisonment.

On appeal in November 2009, Bird was acquitted of the charges, after both he and his girlfriend gave evidence to support his claims.

=== Gold Coast Titans ===
On 7 December 2009, Bird signed a one-year contract with the Gold Coast Titans, starting in 2010, returning to the National Rugby League after being cleared of his glassing conviction. In February 2010, he was voted in by the fans for the Indigenous All Stars team to play the NRL All Stars in the inaugural All Stars Match. In May 2010, he was again selected for the New South Wales Country Origin team in the annual City vs Country Origin match. In July 2010, he was selected for game 3 of the 2010 State of Origin series for New South Wales. He scored a try. In November 2010, Bird played two matches for Australia in their 2010 Four Nations campaign. After playing 22 games for the Titans in 2010, he played for the Titans in 2011 and 2012 while also returning to the representative arena.

In February 2011, Bird was again voted in by the fans for the Indigenous All Stars team to play the NRL All Stars in the annual All Stars Match. In 2011, he was selected for New South Wales in all three games of the 2011 State of Origin series. Bird made a total of 19 appearances for the Gold Coast as they finished bottom of the table and claimed the Wooden Spoon.

In September 2011, he was again selected for the Prime Minister's XIII team to play Papua New Guinea. On 11 January 2013, he re-signed with the Titans on a four-year contract. He was named a Titans co-captain for 2013 alongside Nate Myles. Bird was selected for Australia in the 2013 ANZAC Test and played at second-row forward. In what was the first test match ever played in Canberra, New Zealand were defeated.

In February 2012, Bird was again voted in by the fans for the Indigenous All Stars team to play the NRL All Stars in the annual All Stars match. In April 2012, he was again selected for the Country Origin team in the annual City vs Country Origin match. In 2012, he was again selected for New South Wales in all 3 games of the 2012 State of Origin series. In 2013, Bird played in all three games of the 2013 State of Origin series where NSW failed to win the shield once more. In 2014, he played in Game 2 and 3 of the 2014 State of Origin series where he was finally part of a winning series.

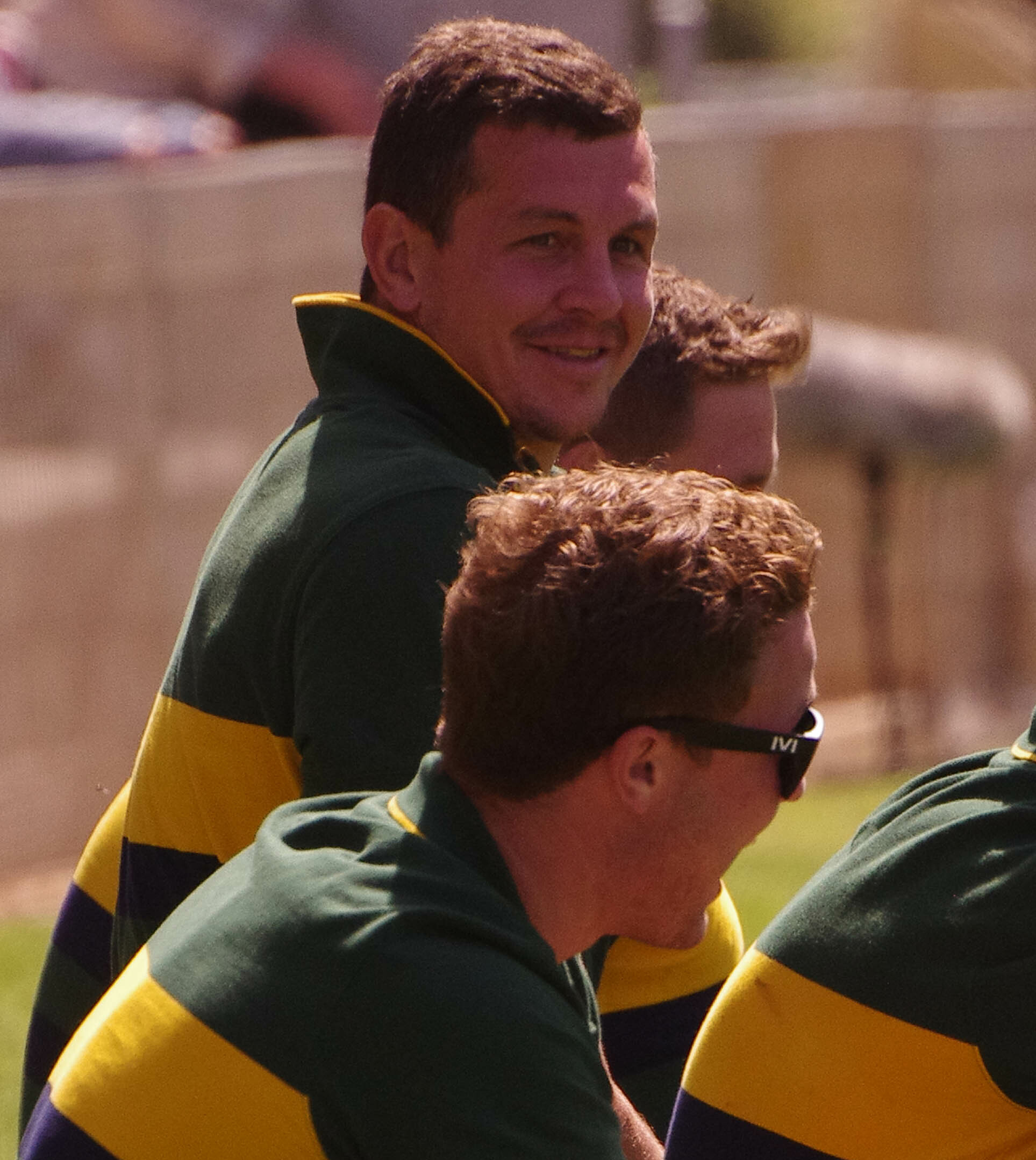
Bird on international duty for the Kangaroos in 2014

On 8 December 2014, Bird was fined after he was caught urinating next to a police car in a carpark outside where he was celebrating his wedding. He told the media "It's put a dampener on our wedding weekend. I'm incredibly embarrassed and disappointed at myself."

In February 2015, Bird was stood down by The Gold Coast after he was issued a court notice along with other Gold Coast players for alleged cocaine supply. On 7 October 2015, he had his charges thrown out of court.

On 17 September 2016, Bird was alleged to have been involved in an incident at a Byron Bay pub and was placed under investigation by the NRL. On 18 October 2016, he was fined $550 after being found guilty of being intoxicated at the venue and refusing to leave after being instructed by security guards to do so. At the end of 2016, he signed a five-year deal to join Super League side Catalans Dragons. Before leaving for France, Bird took one last swipe at The Gold Coast saying "I’m disappointed that like other people at the club I got pushed out the door."

== Statistics ==
Season	Team	Pld	T	G	FG	Pts
2002	Cronulla-Sutherland Sharks	9	2	0	0	8
2003	Cronulla-Sutherland Sharks	21	9	2	0	40
2004	Cronulla-Sutherland Sharks	11	3	2	0	16
2005	Cronulla-Sutherland Sharks	12	1	0	0	4
2006	Cronulla-Sutherland Sharks	17	6	0	0	24
2007	Cronulla-Sutherland Sharks	20	9	2	0	40
2008	Cronulla-Sutherland Sharks	16	5	0	0	20
2009	Catalans Dragons	23	5	3	0	26
2010	Gold Coast Titans	22	3	0	1	13
2011	Gold Coast Titans	19	3	1	1	15
2012	Gold Coast Titans	17	3	0	0	12
2013	Gold Coast Titans	20	3	2	0	16
2014	Gold Coast Titans	17	3	14	0	40
2015	Gold Coast Titans	12	0	2	0	4
2016	Gold Coast Titans	22	2	1		10
2017	Catalans Dragons	18	1			4
2018	Catalans Dragons	27	5			20
2019	Catalans Dragons	15	2			8
	Totals	316	63	28	2	310

== Honours ==
Debut
Cronulla-Sutherland Sharks
First Grade Debut – 28 April 2002
Country
City vs. Country Debut – 3 May 2007
New South Wales Blues
State of Origin Debut – 13 June 2007
Australian Kangaroos
Australian Test Debut – 21 October 2007
Catalans Dragons
Club Debut – 7 March 2009
Gold Coast Titans
Club Debut – 14 March 2010

Sporting positions
Preceded by Scott Prince	Captain; Gold Coast Titans; 2013 – 2016	Succeeded by Nathan Friend
Awards
Preceded by Nate Myles	Gold Coast Titans; Paul Broughton Medal; 2013	Succeeded by Beau Falloon
