= Chris Slane =

New Zealand cartoonist

Chris Slane (born 1957) is a New Zealand cartoonist.

He has had cartoons published in Metro, New Zealand Herald and AA Directions magazine. Slane is currently the cartoonist for the New Zealand Listener and New Zealand Farmers Weekly.

He has a degree in town planning from the University of Auckland, and contributed to the student magazine Craccum while studying there.

== Bibliography ==
- The Home: your guide to social welfare homes (1985)
- Sheep Thrills (1989) ISBN 1-86954-004-2
- Let me Through, I have A Morbid Curiosity (1998) ISBN 0-473-05472-8
- Maui: Legends Of The Outcast (1996) ISBN 1-86962-006-2
