= Gavin Allen =

Australian rugby league footballer (born 1965)

Gavin "Jed" Allen
Personal information
- Full name: Gavin Suan Allen
- Born: 30 March 1965 (age 61) Cairns, Queensland, Australia

Playing information
- Height: 187 cm (6 ft 2 in)
- Weight: 98 kg (15 st 6 lb)
- Position: Prop
Club
Years	Team	Pld	T	G	FG	P
	Fortitude Valley Diehards
1987	St. George Dragons	2	0	0	0	0
1990–95	Brisbane Broncos	65	2	0	0	8
1996	London Broncos	10	0	0	0	0
	Total	77	2	0	0	8
Representative
Years	Team	Pld	T	G	FG	P
1991–95	Queensland	8	0	0	0	0

Gavin Allen (born 30 March 1965) is an Australian former rugby league footballer who played in the 1980s and 1990s. He played club football in the Brisbane Rugby League premiership for Fortitude Valley and in the NSWRL premiership for the St. George Dragons and Brisbane Broncos, achieving selection to play for Queensland in the State of Origin series.

== Career ==
Hailing from Cairns in far north Queensland, where he played junior rugby league with Wests, Gavin Allen started his career with Brisbane's Fortitude Valley Diehards before moving to Sydney's St. George Dragons for the 1987 and 1988 seasons.

An undersized prop forward, Allen returned to Queensland signing with the Brisbane Broncos ahead of the 1989 season. His exceptionally high workrate made him a vital component of the Broncos' forward pack from 1990. Allen made his interstate representative debut when selected on the bench for Game I of the 1991 State of Origin series, becoming Queensland State of Origin player No. 72.

Allen played a major part in the Brisbane forward pack that dominated St. George in the 1992 Grand Final. After taking part in the club's win over Wigan in the World Club Challenge, Allen was a non-playing reserve in the Broncos' return bout with the Dragons in the 1993 Grand Final. With Glenn Lazarus, Andrew Gee and Mark Hohn competing, Allen found it difficult to maintain his first-grade berth.

In 1995, Allen's career was winding down but had a brief reprieve when, by now a fringe first-grader, he was the only Broncos player not signed by Super League. Consequently, he was selected by Queensland coach Paul Vautin for the three State of Origin games, in which his experience and workrate helped players like Gary Larson and Billy Moore win Queensland a totally unexpected cleansweep.

In 1996, Allen signed with the London Broncos in the Super League playing ten matches.

Following his retirement, Allen expanded his role in the printing business he had set up early in his football career, later returning to rugby league as team manager for the Australia national rugby league team and media manager of the Queensland rugby league team.

== Personal life ==
Allen has four children with wife Christine. His son Josh plays for the Redcliffe Dolphins in the Queensland Cup competition, having previously played for the Northern Pride and the Canberra Raiders in the New South Wales Cup.

In 2018, Allen underwent heart transplant surgery, having played his career with a congenital heart issue.
