= Shayne Currie =

New Zealand journalist (born 1971)

- Born: Shayne Currie; 1 April 1971 (age 55)
- Occupation: Journalist
- Organization: The New Zealand Herald
- Awards: Canon Media Awards

Shayne Currie (born 1 April 1971) is a senior journalist from New Zealand. Currie is the Editor at Large of The New Zealand Herald newspaper, based in Auckland. He has previously held executive and senior editorial roles at NZME, including NZME managing editor, NZ Herald editor and Herald on Sunday editor. Currie studied at Tauranga Boys' College in New Zealand.

== Previous career ==
Currie began his journalistic career as a teenager, editing his school's newspaper, the Reflector. In 1989, he began working at The Evening Post in Wellington, where he won the national award for crime reporting. He subsequently worked on newspapers, including The Press and The Sunday Star-Times, which were at the time all part of the same media group, Independent Newspaper Limited (INL), owned then by Australian newspaper magnate Rupert Murdoch. Currie was at The Sunday Star-Times when Murdoch sold his New Zealand newspaper holdings to John Fairfax Holdings, another Australian newspaper publishing company.

In July 2004, Currie resigned from the Star-Times to work on a special project for APN News & Media, which owned The New Zealand Herald and a range of provincial newspapers, magazines, and radio stations. The special project was later revealed to be the Herald on Sunday, another Sunday newspaper. Currie was appointed deputy editor to Suzanne Chetwin.

Currie studied at Cambridge University.

== Editorship ==
Currie took up the editorship of the Herald on Sunday on 1 February 2005, succeeding Chetwin.

On 8 August 2005, he addressed the 2005 PANPA annual conference in Cairns, Australia, on how launching a newspaper can change an entire market. He spoke shortly after Kevin Rudd, the elected prime minister of Australia.

Under Currie's leadership, the Herald on Sunday became only major newspaper in New Zealand to consistently increase its circulation, selling 93,665 papers each week in the audit period ended June 2008.

When the figures were published, Currie said: "In the three years since the launch of the Herald on Sunday, the newspaper has found its voice, attracting new Sunday newspaper buyers to what is the most competitive newspaper market in the country. We owe a huge debt to those who stood with us in our early days, and to those readers who have picked us up for the first time, or more frequently, over the past 12 months. We've listened to what readers liked – and didn't like – and evolved accordingly."

On 9 May 2008, Currie accepted the Qantas Award for Newspaper of the Year for the Herald on Sunday.

In August 2008, the Nielsen Media Research National Readership Survey showed the Herald on Sunday had increased its readership by 64,000 to 390,000: a 19.6% jump in the 12 months to 30 June 2008.

== Controversies ==
During his time as acting editor of The Sunday Star-Times, Currie defended one of his journalists, who was charged with the theft of a videotape that belonged to a drug case involving a teacher and pupils. On an evening in September 2003, one of Currie's reporters took a group of young people to dinner and drinks at the cost of the newspaper. Later in the night, two of the male youths stole the video from the teacher after at least one of them performed oral sex on the teacher, a court heard. Currie was quoted at the time saying the Sunday Star-Times had acted properly. "The newspaper at all times was acting in good faith in a matter of extreme public interest", he said. "As a result of the newspaper's work, a teacher has been charged with supplying teenagers with a Class A drug. We believe we have done everything right in this matter – we handed the videotape to the police before we published anything so that they could carry out their own investigation."

Later, in October 2005, as editor of the Herald on Sunday, Currie discovered that one of his staff reporters, John Manukia, 38, had fabricated an interview with former South Auckland police officer Anthony Solomona. Currie dismissed Manukia and gave a public apology. Further investigations revealed that Manukia had fabricated other material at the Herald on Sunday and as a reporter at another newspaper, the Fairfax-owned Sunday News.

Currie wrote a first-person article in the Herald on Sunday of 23 October 2005, explaining what had happened and expressing his regret to readers. He drew comparisons with the actions of reporters Jayson Blair at The New York Times, and Stephen Glass at The New Republic.

In 2009, a former assistant editor of the Herald on Sunday sued Currie for unjustified dismissal. Reporter Stephen Cook, who helped Currie launch the tabloid, was fired in 2008 after two drug squad detectives visited the Herald on Sunday offices searching for him. Cook had reportedly been seen at an address which was under police surveillance. On the day that the case commenced, Currie faced further scrutiny when The New Zealand Herald revealed examples of industrial espionage. He sent a reporter to the rival Sunday Star-Times print site to obtain advanced copies in a bid to get stories for his own paper. The allegations were again reported in the Sunday News and Sunday Star-Times, branded “unprecedented spying”. Currie and APN won the employment case after the court found Cook's dismissal was justified, as he could not adequately explain why he was at the address under surveillance.

In 2015, the Herald published a front-page story about Prime Minister John Key repeatedly pulling the hair of a waitress, later reported by international media as "ponytail-gate". Currie issued a statement to staff defending the paper's integrity after criticism they had revealed the identity of the waitress without her consent. The New Zealand Media Council later upheld complaints that the Herald used "elements of subterfuge" to persuade the waitress to go public.

== Awards ==
In 2015, Currie was awarded a fellowship to Wolfson College, Cambridge, as part of the 2015 Canon Media Awards.
