= Jacob Lillyman =

Australian rugby league footballer

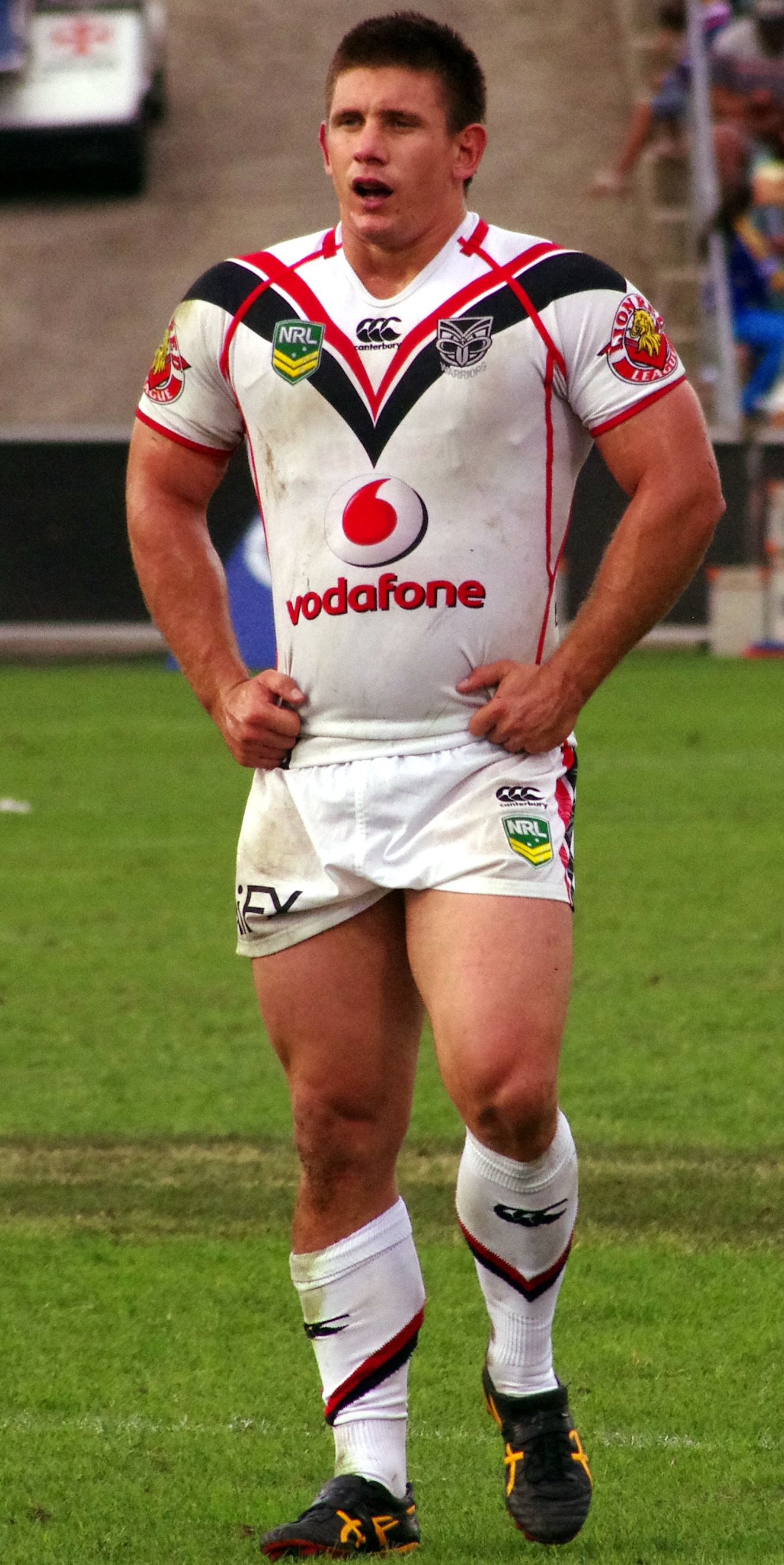

Personal information
- Born: 7 March 1984 (age 42) Richmond, Queensland, Australia

Playing information
- Height: 183 cm (6 ft 0 in)
- Weight: 104 kg (16 st 5 lb)
- Position: Prop, Second-row
Club
Years	Team	Pld	T	G	FG	P
2003–08	North Qld Cowboys	62	3	0	0	12
2009–17	New Zealand Warriors	188	6	0	0	24
2018	Newcastle Knights	15	0	0	0	0
	Total	265	9	0	0	36
Representative
Years	Team	Pld	T	G	FG	P
2006–17	Queensland	14	0	0	0	0

Jacob Lillyman (born 7 March 1984) is an Australian former professional rugby league footballer. Throughout his career, he played for the North Queensland Cowboys, New Zealand Warriors and Newcastle Knights in the National Rugby League, while representing Queensland in State of Origin as a prop or second-row.

== Early years ==
Lillyman was born in Richmond, Queensland, Australia.

Lillyman attended Columba Catholic College, Charters Towers, where he was a boarding student for a while. His youth club was the Richmond Tigers in Northwest Queensland.

While attending Kirwan State High School, Lillyman played for the Australian Schoolboys team in 2002.

== Playing career ==
=== North Queensland Cowboys ===
Lillyman made his debut for the Cowboys in round 22 of the 2003 season against the Newcastle Knights. He then went on to play sixty two games for the club, showing good enough form to earn State of Origin selection.

In 2008 Lillyman was forced to leave the North Queensland Cowboys due to salary-cap pressures, and that year there ended abruptly for him when he suffered a season-ending injury in Round 15, playing against the Melbourne Storm.

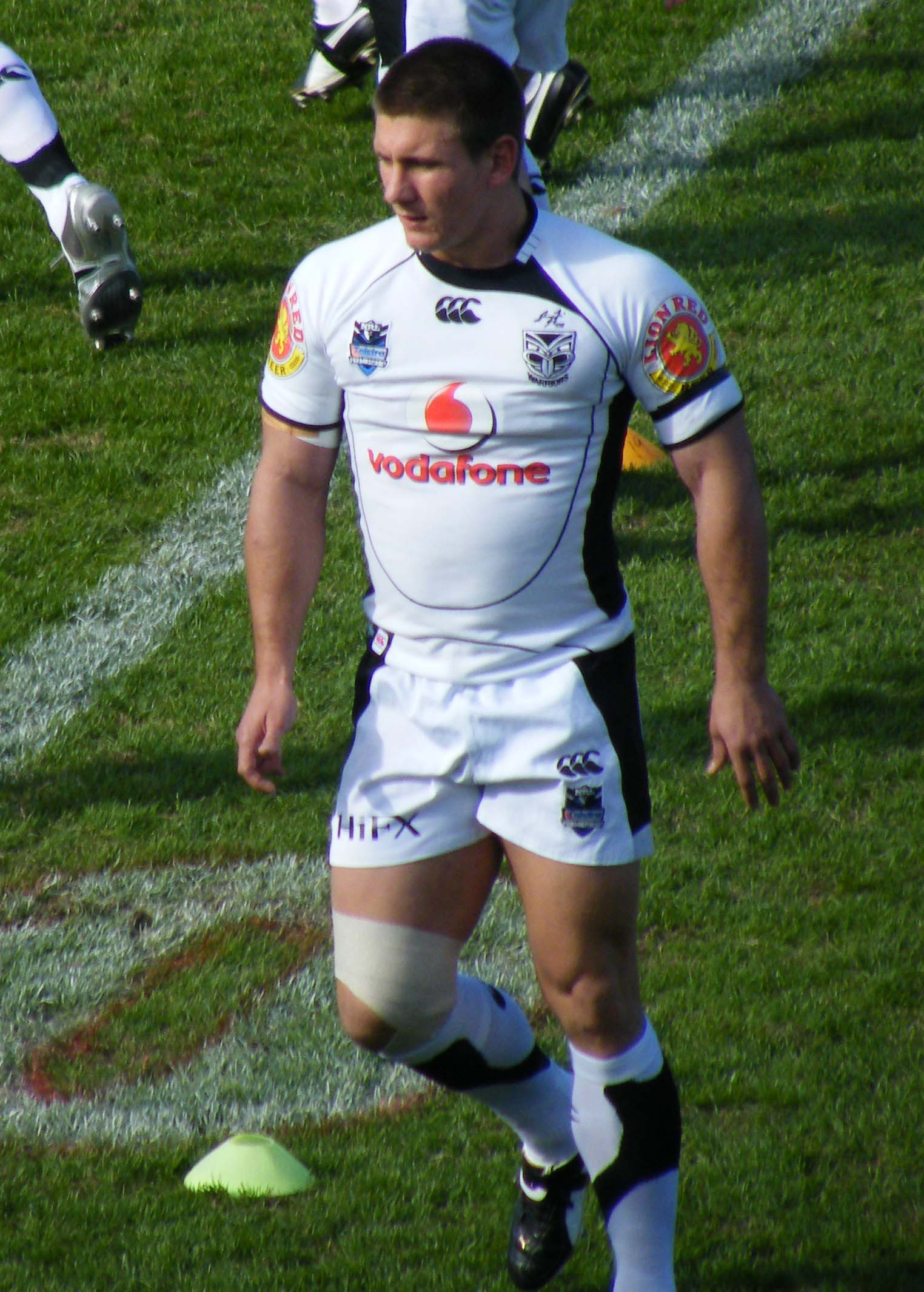
Jacob Lillyman playing for the New Zealand Warriors

=== New Zealand Warriors ===
In June 2008, it was announced that he had signed a two-year deal with the New Zealand Warriors for the 2009 and 2010 seasons. At that time he was joining a strong Queensland contingent at the club, which included former Cowboys Nathan Fien and Micheal Luck and well as fellow State representatives Steve Price and Brent Tate. In August 2010 he signed a one-year extension and a further two-year extension followed in May 2011 when Lillyman re-signed for the Warriors until the end of the 2013 season In April 2014 he re-signed until the end of the 2017 season, which would make it a straight nine years with the club. On 3 April 2016 Lillyman became the 11th player to mark 150 games for the New Zealand Warriors in their 32–28 win over the Sydney Roosters at Gosford, NSW, making 159 metres, with 31 tackles.

=== Newcastle Knights ===
After 188 games with the New Zealand Warriors, Lillyman decided it was time to return to Australia, signing a one-year contract with the Newcastle Knights starting in 2018.

In round 1 of the 2018 season, Lillyman made his debut for the Newcastle club in their 19-18 golden point extra-time win over the Manly Warringah Sea Eagles.

In August 2018, he announced he would be retiring at the end of the 2018 season.

== Statistics ==
Year	Team	Games	Tries	Pts
2003	North Queensland Cowboys	3		
2005	North Queensland Cowboys	12	1	4
2006	North Queensland Cowboys	15		
2007	North Queensland Cowboys	21	1	4
2008	North Queensland Cowboys	11	1	4
2009	New Zealand Warriors	24		
2010	New Zealand Warriors	12	1	4
2011	New Zealand Warriors	26	1	4
2012	New Zealand Warriors	16	2	8
2013	New Zealand Warriors	22	1	4
2014	New Zealand Warriors	24		
2015	New Zealand Warriors	21		
2016	New Zealand Warriors	22	1	4
2017	New Zealand Warriors	21		
2018	Newcastle Knights	15		
	Totals	256	9	36

== Representative career ==
Lillyman made his State of Origin debut for Queensland on 14 June 2006 coming off the bench in the 53rd minute. Lillyman was recalled to the Queensland State of Origin team for the first match on the 2011 series.

In the week leading up to Game II of the 2013 State of Origin series, it was announced that Lillyman would replace injured Sydney Roosters forward Martin Kennedy as the 18th man for Queensland in the next game of the series, marking his return to representative football.

Lillyman played for Queensland in games two and three of the 2014 State of Origin series and in all three of the 2015 State of Origin series.

A week before Game II of the 2016 State of Origin series, it was announced that Lillyman would replace injured Manly Warringah Sea Eagles prop Nate Myles for Queensland in the next game of the series.
