= Martin Lang (rugby league) =

Australian rugby league footballer (born 1975)

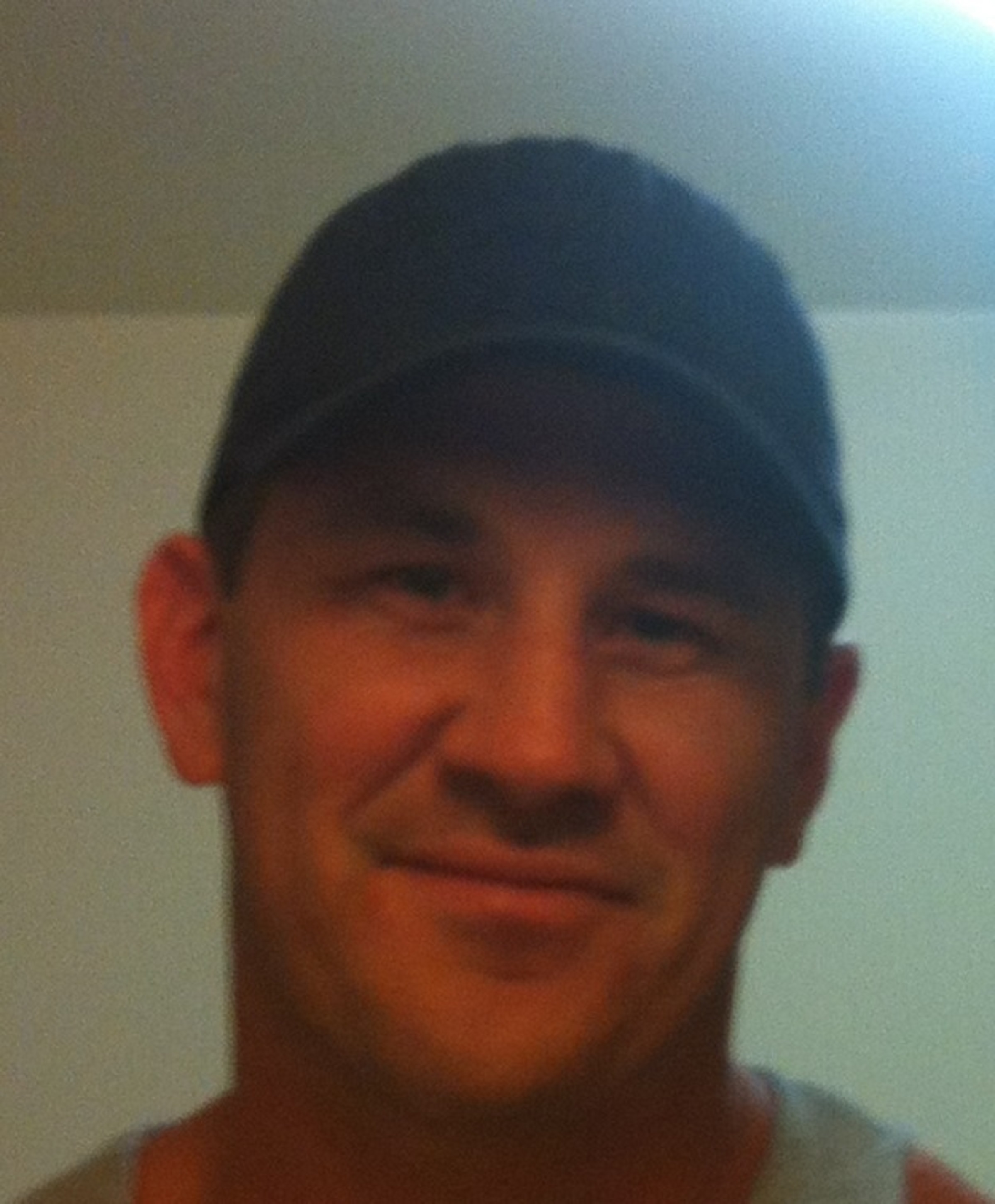
- Lang in 2013

Personal information
- Born: 26 September 1975 (age 51)

Playing information
- Height: 188 cm (6 ft 2 in)
- Weight: 110 kg (17 st 5 lb)
- Position: Prop
Club
Years	Team	Pld	T	G	FG	P
1996–01	Cronulla Sharks	109	2	0	0	8
2002–04	Penrith Panthers	67	0	0	0	0
	Total	176	2	0	0	8
Representative
Years	Team	Pld	T	G	FG	P
1998–00	Queensland	8	0	0	0	0
- Father: John Lang

Martin Lang (born 26 September 1975) is an Australian former professional rugby league footballer who played in the 1990s and 2000s. He played as a prop in the National Rugby League for the Cronulla-Sutherland Sharks and the Penrith Panthers as well as representing for the Queensland Maroons in State of Origin. Martin Lang is the son of Australian former international and coach John Lang, under whom he played his entire top-grade career.

== Playing career ==
Lang made his first grade debut for Cronulla-Sutherland against the Sydney City Roosters in round 21 1996 at the Sydney Football Stadium. In the same year he played in the club's qualifying final victory over Western Suburbs.

In 1997, Cronulla joined the rival Super League competition during the Super League war. Lang missed out on playing in Cronulla's grand final team which lost to the Brisbane Broncos. In 1999, Lang played 23 games as Cronulla won the minor premiership but suffered preliminary final heartbreak against St. George at Stadium Australia.

Lang was a hard-running prop with a straight, unswerving style when taking the ball forward. He ran 4,571 metres with the ball over the 2000 NRL season, more than any other player in the competition.

Lang's final game for Cronulla was the club's preliminary final loss against eventual premiers Newcastle in the 2001 NRL season.

In April, 2002, Lang was knocked unconscious by a high-tackle from Petero Civoniceva. The resulting concussion, his tenth, led to calls for the prop to retire or to change his running style. Commenting later on his concussions, Lang said, "There was times when I'd been knocked out that you weren't aware of anything until you're sitting on the sideline and you're thinking, 'Geez, what happened?' You're not feeling fresh. It's liked you've been drugged or had an anaesthetic or something like that, you're feeling very ordinary."

Lang played at prop forward for the Penrith Panthers in their 2003 NRL grand final victory over the Sydney Roosters. As 2003 NRL premiers, the Penrith travelled to England to face Super League VIII champions, the Bradford Bulls in the 2004 World Club Challenge. Lang played at prop forward in the Penrith's 22–4 loss.

Retiring at the end of the 2004 NRL season, Lang spent a period recovering from surgery on a disc in his spine. He has said he, "pretty much couldn't do a thing for the whole of 2005. For about nine months there, I couldn't even lift up my kids."

Martin Lang is a neuroscientist, with a special interest in contact sport-induced traumatic brain injury (concussion) phenotypes.

He is a former professional NRL and State of Origin Rugby League player and is a member of the Australasian Neuroscience and International Neuropsychological societies.

He is also Managing Director of QLD Spinal Arthroplasty Solutions, based on the Gold Coast.

Martin holds a Bachelor of Exercise/Biomedical Science (Bex/Biomed Sci) awarded The Griffith Award for Academic Excellence.
