= Bob Kellaway =

Australian rugby league footballer

Bob Kellaway (born 24 November 1955) is a former professional rugby league footballer who played in the 1980s for Bradford Northern where he played for the Queensland Maroons from 1982 to 1984.
