= Bruce Astill =

Australian rugby league player

Personal information
- Born: 13 June 1955 (age 71)

Playing information
Club
| Years | Team | Pld | T | G | FG | P |
|---|---|---|---|---|---|---|
| | Souths Magpies |
Representative
| Years | Team | Pld | T | G | FG | P |
| 1979 | Queensland | 2 | 0 | 0 | 0 | 0 |
| 1983 | Brisbane | 1 | 0 | 0 | 0 | 0 |

Bruce Astill (born 13 June 1955) is an Australian former professional rugby league footballer who played in the 1970s and 1980s. A Queensland State of Origin representative three-quarter back, he played club football in the Brisbane Rugby League premiership with Souths Magpies whom he captained to victory in the 1981 Grand Final.

Astill first represented Queensland against New South Wales in 1979. He was selected on the bench for the first ever State of Origin match in 1980, becoming Queensland State of Origin player No. 15, but did not take the field.

In 1981, Astill captained the Souths Magpies to a Brisbane Rugby League premiership. He again played for Queensland in the third and deciding match of the 1983 State of Origin series.
