= Gary Larson (rugby league) =

Australia international rugby league footballer

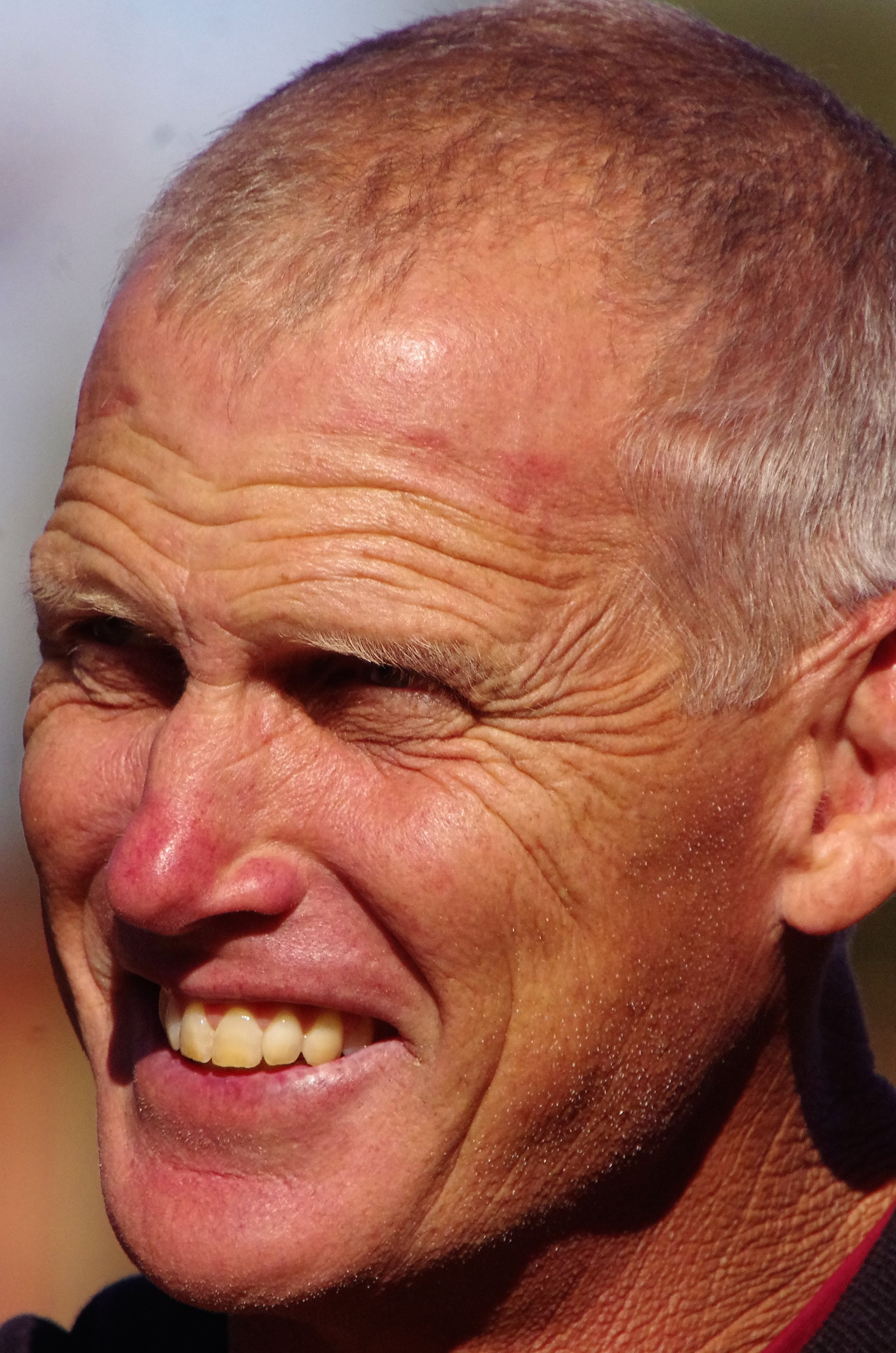
- Larson in 2021

Personal information
- Born: 2 January 1967 (age 59) Gladstone, Queensland, Australia

Playing information
- Position: Lock, Second-row, Prop
Club
Years	Team	Pld	T	G	FG	P
1987–1999	North Sydney Bears	233	33	0	0	132
2000	Parramatta Eels	17	1	0	0	4
	Total	250	34	0	0	136
Representative
Years	Team	Pld	T	G	FG	P
1991–98	Queensland	24	0	0	0	0
1995–97	Australia	9	1	0	0	4
- Source: As of 11 November 2019

Gary Larson (born 2 January 1967) is an Australian former rugby league footballer who played as a lock, prop and second-row forward in the 1980s and 1990s.

He represented Australia internationally and Queensland in State of Origin, and played most of his club football with the North Sydney Bears, before finishing his career with a brief stint at the Parramatta Eels.

== Background ==
Larson was born in Gladstone, Queensland, Australia.

== Career ==
=== North Sydney Bears ===
Larson made his first grade debut for North Sydney in his only game for the 1987 NSWRL season, a Round 9 match with Penrith at Penrith Stadium. Starting from the bench, Larson scored a try on debut but the Bears still went down to the Panthers 19–10. 1988 saw Larson playing mainly Reserve Grade for the Bears and he only played two games for the season, including his debut in the starting side playing second-row in North Sydney's 6–38 loss to league newcomers, the Newcastle Knights.

Nicknamed "Sven Svennson" due to his Nordic appearance, Larson cemented his place in North Sydney's first grade forward pack in 1989, playing 22 games for the season. As a player, he became known for his reliability as a "workhorse" due to his staggering workload in matches.

Larson's breakout season was 1991. That year, in a team with players such as Phil Blake, David Fairleigh, Mario Fenech, Greg Florimo, Peter Jackson, Les Kiss, Billy Moore, and goal kicking sensation Daryl Halligan, his efforts were rewarded with State of Origin selection for Queensland, as well as helping Norths to the finals for the first time since 1982.

It would be the start of a Bears resurgence as the club with the league's longest premiership drought (not having won a title since 1922) only failing to reach the Semi-finals on three occasions (1992, 1993 and 1999) between 1991 and 1999, Larson's last season with the club. The clubs perennial bad luck still showed though as the Bears failed at the last hurdle (Preliminary Final), therefore failing to make the Grand Final, on four occasions, (1991, 1994, 1996 and 1997), falling to the eventual premiers Penrith, Canberra and Newcastle in 1991, 1994 and 1997, while losing to runners-up St George in 1996.

Larson was sent off in the 1994 Preliminary final against the Canberra Raiders for a dangerous tackle on Raiders second-rower David Furner. According to most experts, it was this send-off which cost Larson selection on the 1994 Kangaroo Tour. Teammates Greg Florimo and 1994 Rothmans Medal winner David Fairleigh were selected to tour with the Kangaroos.

Larson remained loyal to the Bears and the Australian Rugby League (ARL) during the Super League War. He played for Queensland in their shock 3-0 1995 State of Origin series whitewash of New South Wales, before making his test debut for Australia in the 1995 Trans-Tasman Test series win over New Zealand.

At the end of the 1995 ARL season in which North Sydney finished in 8th place and were bundled out of the Finals in the first round by Newcastle, Larson was considered a certainty for selecting in Australia's squad for the 1995 Rugby League World Cup played in England and France. He was duly selected to the ARL only squad, but declined to tour for personal reasons. However, following an injury to Newcastle front rower Paul Harragon during an early tournament game, Kangaroo's coach Bob Fulton sent an SOS for Larson to join the squad in England. Larson answered the call and went on to play in Australia's 16–8 win over England in the World Cup Final at London's famous Wembley stadium, London.

Larson announced his retirement from representative games in 1999, but following the merger of North Sydney and their local rivals Manly-Warringah to become the Northern Eagles, chose to see out the final season of his career with the Parramatta Eels.

Larson played for North Sydney in their last game as a top grade side which came in against North Queensland in round 26 1999 at the Willows Sports Complex. Norths won the match 28–18.

=== Parramatta Eels ===
Larson joined Parramatta in 2000, in what would prove to be his final season of rugby league before retiring. He played 16 games for the Parramatta club in 2000, mostly from the bench, helping the team to 7th on the ladder, but missing their finals campaign due to injury.

Larson played 249 first grade games for North Sydney and Parramatta over 14 seasons, scoring 34 tries (Norths – 233 games, 33 tries. Parramatta – 16 games, 1 try). In August 2006, Larson was named at prop-forward in the North Sydney Bears' Team of the Century.

== Representative career ==
=== Queensland ===
Larson played his first game for Queensland in Game 1 of the 1991 State of Origin series when he was chosen at lock forward for the game at Lang Park in Brisbane. He would go on to claim the record for the most consecutive State of Origin appearances with 24 for Qld, from his first game in Game 1 of the 1991 series until his last match, Game 3 of the 1998 series. This record was equaled by Queensland's Johnathan Thurston in Game 3 of the historic 2012 series in which Qld won their record 7th series in a row.

Gary Larson was named man-of-the-match in the second game of the 1995 series and the third game of the 1997 series. Roy and HG, when commentating State of Origin matches on radio, would refer to Larson as being "on the far side" of the playing arena – a joke aimed at his name being shared with famous cartoonist Gary Larson ("and the ball is passed to Gary Larson... on the far side...").

=== Australia ===
Between 1995 and 1997, at the height of the Super League War, Gary Larson played in 9 tests for Australia. Following the ARL's decision not to select any Super League signed player for representative duty in 1995, Larson made his belated test debut in the first test of the 1995 Trans-Tasman Test series against New Zealand. He would play all three tests against the Kiwis, helping the Kangaroos to a 3–0 series whitewash with what many originally believed to be a 'second string' side without the SL players.

Larson initially declared his unavailability for Australia's 1995 Rugby League World Cup team due to family commitments. However, he answered a call from coach Bob Fulton to join the team in England following a broken cheekbone suffered by Paul Harragon and, after playing in the 66-0 thrashing of Fiji where he scored his only test try, he played in both the Semi-final, against NZ, and the final against England in front of 66,540 at Wembley Stadium, London. The Australian's won their 8th World Cup with a 16–8 win.

Gary Larson would then play in two 'tests' in 1996. The first, an 84–10 win at the Marathon Stadium in Newcastle against ARL aligned players representing Fiji, and the second, a 52–6 win over an ARL-aligned Papua New Guinea at the Lloyd Robson Oval in Port Moresby.

Larson's final match in the green and gold was in 1997 for a game against the Rest of the World. With the ARL struggling to play international matches against other countries as most had signed with the Super League, a composite international side of ARL aligned players was put together for a match against Australia at Brisbane's Suncorp Stadium. Putting in his usual workhorse performance, Larson helped the Kangaroos to a 28–6 win in front of just 14,927 fans, the smallest international crowd in Brisbane for 15 years.

== Personal life ==
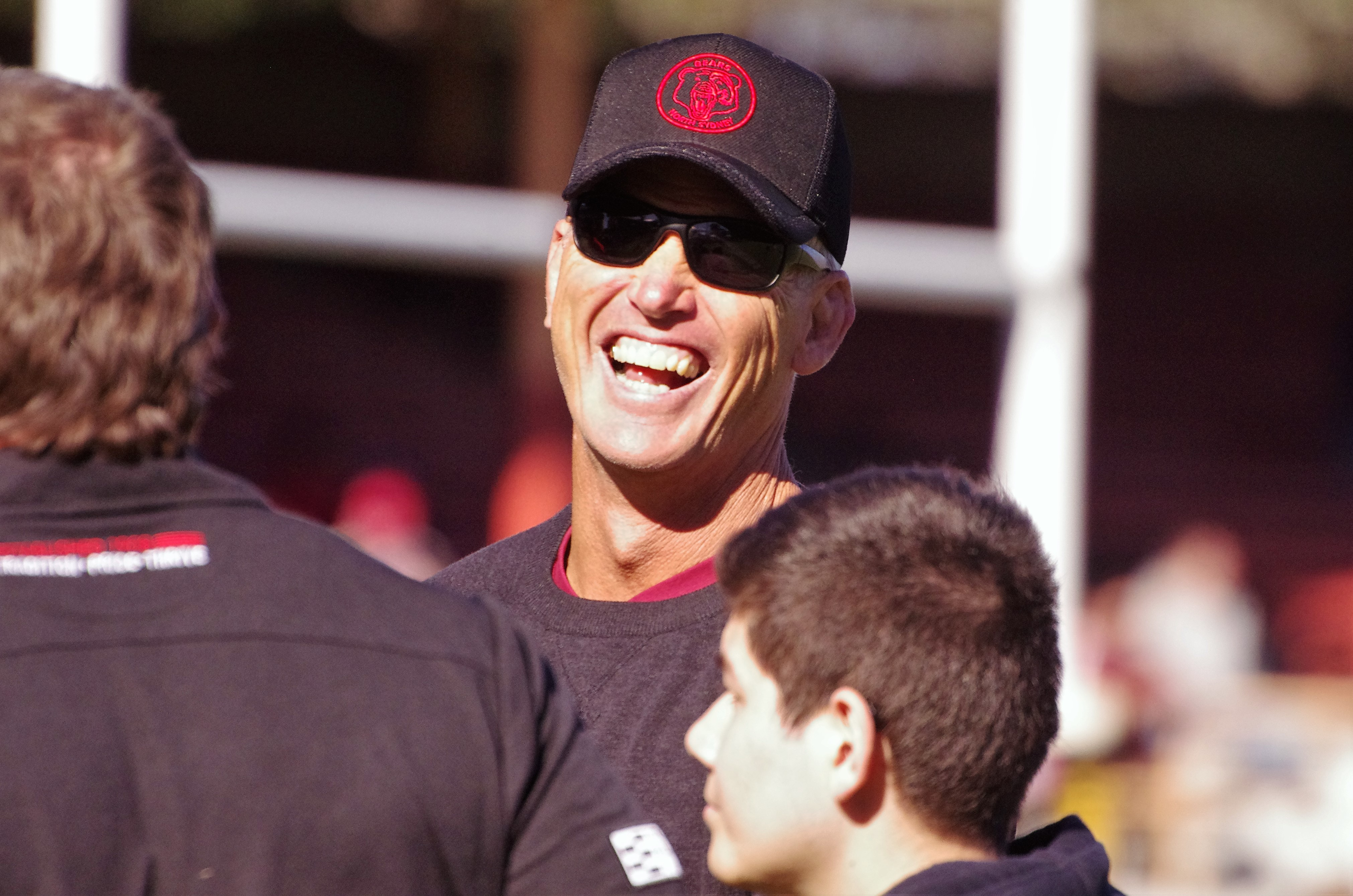
Larson at a North Sydney Bears game in 2021

Larson currently lives in the coastal town of Tannum Sands in Qld with his wife Kate and his two children, Poppy and Jack. Larson is still heavily involved in the football industry. He is also the brother-in-law of fellow former Norths teammate Greg Florimo.
