= Peter Jackson (scientist) =

Bajan chief scientist (1949–2011)

- Born: 1949; Bridgetown, Barbados
- Died: August 3, 2011 (aged 61–62); Burnsville, Minnesota
- Education: Graduate; Ph.D. in Artificial Intelligence
- Alma mater: University of Leeds

Peter Eric Jackson (1949, Bridgetown, Barbados – August 3, 2011, Burnsville, Minnesota) was the chief scientist and head of research and development at Thomson Reuters.

== Biography ==
He was born in 1949 in Bridgetown, Barbados, and graduated from University of Leeds with a Ph.D. in Artificial Intelligence. He died August 3, 2011, aged 62, at his home in Burnsville, Minnesota.

== Publications ==
- Introduction to Expert Systems, Addison Wesley (1986, 1992, 1999)
- Logic-Based Knowledge Representation, MIT Press (1989)
- Natural Language Processing for Online Applications, John Benjamins (2002, 2007)
