= Peter Jackson (journalist) =

American journalist (born 1950)

- Born: December 12, 1950 (age 75); Bangor, Maine, U.S.
- Education: B.A. English, Penn State University, 1976
- Occupation: Journalist
- Notable credit: Associated Press
- Spouse: Renee Jackson
- Children: Erin Nicole (Ferry)

Peter Jackson (born December 12, 1950) is an American journalist and was the correspondent in charge of the Associated Press bureau in Harrisburg, Pennsylvania, from 1996 to 2016. He previously worked in the AP bureau in Augusta, Maine, from 1978 to 1996, serving most of that period as the correspondent.

Jackson covered eight gubernatorial campaigns (1978, 1982, 1986, 1990 and 1994 in Maine, and 1998, 2002, 2006, 2010 and 2014 in Pennsylvania). He helped cover national political conventions in San Francisco in 1984, Philadelphia in 2000 and Boston in 2004.

In 2005, he was named one of "Pennsylvania's Most Influential Reporters" by the Pennsylvania political news website PoliticsPA. In 2006, Jackson edited a series of stories about Pennsylvania's state pension system that generated significant statewide interest. He was named Pennsylvania AP Staffer of the Year in 2007.

Jackson retired in 2016 after 38 years with AP.
