= Gary Coyne =

Australian former professional footballer

Personal information
- Born: 30 September 1961 (age 64) Ipswich, Queensland, Australia

Playing information
- Position: Second-row
Club
Years	Team	Pld	T	G	FG	P
1983–85	Wynnum-Manly
1986–92	Canberra Raiders	171	28	0	0	112
	Total	171	28	0	0	112
Representative
Years	Team	Pld	T	G	FG	P
1989–92	Queensland	11	0	0	0	0
1991	Australia	2	0	0	0	0
- Source: RLP and Yesterday's Hero

Gary Coyne (born 30 September 1961) is an Australian former professional rugby league footballer who played in the 1980s and 1990s. An Australia international and Queensland State of Origin representative forward, he played club football in the Brisbane Rugby League for the Wynnum-Manly Seagulls (with whom he won the 1984 premiership) and in the New South Wales Rugby League for the Canberra Raiders (with whom he won the 1989 and 1990 premierships).

== Playing career ==
Originally from Ipswich, Coyne was a part of Canberra's competition-winning side of the 1989 and 1990 seasons. Coyne also played for the club in two further grand finals which both ended in defeat which were the 1987 and 1991 deciders.

In the 1989 post season, he travelled with the Canberra club to England for the 1989 World Club Challenge which was lost to Widnes. He also played in two Test matches for Australia in 1991 and 11 State of Origin games for Queensland between 1989 and 1992.

Coyne was named a member of Canberra's 25-man "Dream Team" in 2007, as part of the club's 25th anniversary of their entry into first-grade rugby league.

In the 1991 semifinal against the Manly-Warringah Sea Eagles, Coyne went over for his 4th and final try of the match after Canberra legend Mal Meninga took a tap instead of the expected shot at goal. Manly were stunned and seen out of the 1991 season. Meninga can be seen casually approaching Coyne and suggesting something as the Manly players walk towards the posts, backs turned.
