= Mike McLean (rugby league) =

Australian rugby league footballer

Personal information
- Full name: Mike McLean
- Born: 11 March 1963 (age 63) Bowen, Queensland, Australia

Playing information
- Position: Second-row
Club
Years	Team	Pld	T	G	FG	P
1985–90	Eastern Suburbs	52	5	0	0	20
1991	Newcastle Knights	17	1	0	0	4
1992	Gold Coast	16	1	0	0	4
	Total	85	7	0	0	28
Representative
Years	Team	Pld	T	G	FG	P
1991–92	Queensland	5	0	0	0	0
- Source: As of 23 January 2019

Mike McLean is an Australian former rugby league footballer who played in the 1980s and 1990s. McLean played in the New South Wales Rugby League and the Brisbane Rugby League for the Eastern Suburbs Roosters, Newcastle Knights and the Gold Coast Seagulls. He gained selection for the Queensland Origin team. His position of choice was second-row.

== Playing career ==
He started his first grade career for the Easts Tigers in the Brisbane Rugby League in 1983. McLean also ran second in the Dally M medal to Gavin Miller in 1988. He was affectionately known as the 'Paddle pop lion' due to his rather prominent head of hair.

== Representative career ==
McLean was named in the Queensland squad in 1991 to 1992.

== Post playing ==
McLean is a fourth generation publican and operates a bar in Bowen, Queensland.
