= Peter Jackson (rugby league) =

Australian rugby league footballer

Personal information
- Born: 19 May 1964 Brisbane, Queensland, Australia
- Died: 5 November 1997 (aged 33) Sydney, New South Wales, Australia

Playing information
- Position: Centre, Five-eighth
Club
Years	Team	Pld	T	G	FG	P
1981–86	Souths Magpies
1987–88	Canberra Raiders	43	15	6	2	72
1987–88	Leeds	21	5	0	0	20
1989–90	Brisbane Broncos	29	5	0	0	20
1991–93	North Sydney Bears	31	3	0	2	14
	Total	124	28	6	4	126
Representative
Years	Team	Pld	T	G	FG	P
1986–92	Queensland	17	2	1	0	10
1988–92	Australia	9	4	0	0	16

Peter Jackson (19 May 1964 – 5 November 1997) was an Australian professional rugby league footballer who played in the 1980s and 1990s. Nicknamed 'Jacko', he was an Australia national and Queensland State of Origin representative centre or five-eighth. Jackson played club football in the Brisbane Rugby League for the Souths Magpies, before moving to the New South Wales Rugby League and playing for the Canberra Raiders, Brisbane Broncos and North Sydney Bears. He also played in the Rugby Football League for English club Leeds. Jackson worked in the media following his retirement in 1993, and died as the result of a drug overdose in 1997.

== Playing career ==
=== 1980s ===
In 1980, Jackson played rugby union in the under-17s Australian schoolboys representative team, before playing in the under-18s Australian schoolboys rugby league team the following year. He went on to play in the Brisbane Rugby League premiership for Souths Brisbane, and proved himself as a valuable attacking player at Centre and Five-eighth under the coaching of mentor Wayne Bennett. At Souths, Jackson was also a teammate of heavyweight centre partner Mal Meninga, and fullback Gary Belcher. Together they played in the 1985 Brisbane Rugby League season's Grand Final victory over Wally Lewis's Wynnum-Manly side. In 1986, Jackson made his State of Origin début for the Queensland team coached by Bennett, and the following year he followed Bennett to play for the Canberra Raiders in the NSWRL premiership, where he re-linked with Meninga and Belcher, who had moved there at the end of 1985. Jackson also played in the centres at Canberra, appearing in the Raiders' 1987 NSWRL season's Grand Final loss to Manly-Warringah.

Jackson later signed for the English rugby league club Leeds, and played there for the 1987–88 English season, along with fellow Australian imports Peter Tunks, Steve Morris and Marty Gurr. During the 1987–88 Rugby Football League season Jackson played at centre, and scored a try in Leeds' 14–15 loss toy St. Helens in the 1987–88 John Player Special Trophy Final at Central Park, Wigan on 9 January 1988.

The 1988 season saw Jackson achieve international selection for the first time in Australia's successful home defence of The Ashes during the 1988 Great Britain Lions tour. In the Centenary Test in 1988, the first match of the three-Test series at the Sydney Football Stadium, Jackson scored two tries, contributing to Australia's 17–6 win. He went on to play in all three Tests of this series against the Lions, as well as the one-off Test against Papua New Guinea. At the end of this season, Jackson departed Canberra to sign with the Brisbane Broncos for the next two years, once again under the coaching of Bennett. In June 1989 he played at centre in the Brisbane Bronco's' 1989 Panasonic Cup tournament's final victory over the Illawarra Steelers, also scoring a try. In July 1989 Jackson was selected to go on the 1989 Kangaroo tour of New Zealand playing several tour games against local sides, but didn't play in any Test matches.

=== 1990s ===
Jackson joined the North Sydney Bears in 1991 and his arrival, along with the addition of veteran forward Mario Fenech, and goal-kicking winger Daryl Halligan, saw the club's fortunes turn around as they went from being easybeats (not having won a premiership since 1922) to being title contenders. Playing at five-eighth, Jackson was the focal point of the team's attack during their successful 1991 season where they finished just one game shy of qualifying for the club's first Grand Final appearance since 1943, losing the preliminary final 30–14 to defending premiers Canberra.

After being overlooked for a Test return in the first match of the 1991 Trans-Tasman series against New Zealand in favour of former Test captain Wally Lewis, Jackson's form for the North Sydney Bears earned him a recall for the second Test in Sydney after Australia's shock 24–8 loss to the Kiwis in Melbourne. His international return quickly turned sour, though, as he was sent off midway through the first half of the game, which Australia's new-look team won 44–0. Despite his send-off, Jackson retained his place for the deciding Test at Lang Park in Brisbane, where Australia won again, 40–12. At the end of the 1991 season, Jackson was selected to go on the 1991 Kangaroo tour of Papua New Guinea playing in the second Test for Australia against the Kumuls.

The 1992 season saw his form continue for both the North Sydney Bears and for Queensland in the Origin series, and he was selected for the first two Ashes Tests against Great Britain on their 1992 Australasian tour, however Jackson's Test career came to an end when Australia suffered a 33–10 loss to Great Britain in the second Test in Melbourne.

Also in 1992, Jackson released a book of "rugby league facts, funnies and argument starters" called Whatd'ya Reckon!.

== Death ==
It would later be revealed that, as a fifteen-year-old, Jackson had been sexually abused by his (Southport) football coach, Hugh Michael "Ossie" McNamara (1935–2012), a former Roman Catholic Marist Brother (his clerical name was "Brother Oswald") who was later convicted and jailed (in 1995) for indecently dealing with a boy at Marist Brothers' College Ashgrove, Queensland. McNamara had molested boys at St Joseph's College, Hunters Hill in Sydney while he was a brother at the school during the 1970s. It has been alleged that McNamara was let go by St Joseph's but was never actually charged. McNamara then started working at The Southport School where he sexually abused a number of the 1980 1st XV Rugby team, including Jackson.

The trauma caused by this abuse led Jackson to suffer from depression and to use drugs and alcohol throughout his life to try to combat it. In November 1997, Jackson shocked the Australian rugby league community when he died, alone in a Sydney hotel room, of a heroin overdose. He was cremated and his ashes were scattered at both Stanwell Park, where he lived, south of Sydney and at Lang Park in Brisbane.

Jackson's death went on to be used as a powerful image in 2000 in a radio and television campaign to raise awareness of an anti-child abuse campaign. Since 2003, the Peter Jackson Memorial Trophy has been awarded to the person, whether a player or member of the support staff, who makes the greatest contribution to the Queensland State of Origin team each year.
