= Billy Moore (rugby league, born 1971) =

Australian footballer (born 1971)

Personal information
- Born: 7 May 1971 (age 55) Tenterfield, New South Wales, Australia

Playing information
- Weight: 95 kg (14 st 13 lb)
- Position: Lock, Second-row
Club
Years	Team	Pld	T	G	FG	P
1989–99	North Sydney Bears	211	34	0	0	136
Representative
Years	Team	Pld	T	G	FG	P
1992–97	Queensland	17	1	0	0	4
1995–97	Australia	3	0	0	0	0

Billy Moore (born 7 May 1971) is an Australian former rugby league footballer who played as a lock or second-row forward in the 1980s and 1990s. He played representative football for both Queensland and Australia.

== Background ==
Moore was born in Tenterfield, New South Wales and raised in Wallangarra, Queensland. He was born in Tenterfield as their town's hospital was closer to Wallangarra than the one in Stanthorpe. Moore was quoted as saying, "My Mum assures me I was rushed back to the Channel Country before the oxygen had time to affect my lungs."

He attended Wallangarra State School and, later, Stanthorpe State High School and began playing his junior rugby league for the Wallangarra Bulls. At 15, he played his first senior game for Inglewood-Milmerran against Warwick.

When the Wallangarra Bulls club folded, Moore began playing for the Tenterfield Tigers, where he was selected to represent New South Wales under-17s in 1988. Later that year, after representing Queensland Schoolboys, Moore received contract offers from the North Sydney Bears, Penrith Panthers, Brisbane Broncos and Parramatta Eels, signing with the Bears.

== Playing career ==
In 1989, Moore moved to Sydney to join the North Sydney Bears and played in the club's reserve grade premiership side. In 2019, Moore recalled when he first joined the club saying, "All this talk about the Bears being losers, I didn't give a shit about it, I hated it. I despised the fact that we even mentioned it, because that was the legacy of the past, that wasn't something we'd carry into the future".

With a radical change of the guard the following year, Moore and a number of other players (including long-time back-row partner David Fairleigh) became regular first graders the following year and propelled the club from also-rans in 1989 to finalists in 1991. Although Moore damaged a jaw at the start of that year, he played superbly in the first semi-final win by the Bears for 39 years against Manly, scoring two tries. Moore was first selected in Queensland's State of Origin side in 1992. Moore was the sole try-scorer in the Maroons' 5–4 win in the second match of the series at Lang Park.

Moore was a regular selection for the maroon jersey for three seasons and famously yelled 'Queenslander! Queenslander!' in an attempt to motivate an underdog Maroons team on their way out of the tunnel in 1995 Moore was reacting to the fact that New South Wales players had said they would belt the first person that said he was a Queenslander. The young Queenslanders won the series 3 nil without its star Super League players. While Moore was initially overlooked for Test duty against New Zealand, he won a place in Australia's World Cup squad at the end of the year. He made one appearance in the competition, against South Africa, before playing further ARL Tests against Fiji (1996) and Rest of the World (1997) in consecutive years.

He continued to play for his club in subsequent semi-final campaigns but his representative career ended when he was left out of the Queensland team for the 1998 series. At the end of 1999, Moore failed to secure a contract with the merged Northern Eagles club and reluctantly retired.

As part of the South Sydney Rabbitohs push to be reinstated in first grade, Moore played for the club in promotional games to raise money and awareness and to gain support of the rugby league community for a readmission into the NRL which was ultimately successful in 2002.

== Post-playing ==
In 2000, Moore was awarded the Australian Sports Medal for his contribution to Australia's international standing in rugby league. In August 2006 he was named in the North Sydney Bears' Team of the Century. He now co-owns a restaurant on Queensland's Sunshine Coast.

In 2011, Moore became the ambassador for a second Brisbane NRL expansion team. In 2015, Moore became a panelist on Fox Sports for the NRL 360 show. In July 2015, Moore was forced to apologize after making derogatory comments regarding the New Zealand Warriors playing style. Moore read a statement saying "I would like to sincerely apologise to anyone that was offended by my comment regarding the New Zealand Warriors playing style, particularly the Polynesian community – many of whom I played with and am great mates with".

In 2017, Moore advocated for the return of the North Sydney Bears as a merged entity with the Gold Coast Titans. There were talks of Norths buying the Gold Coast licence with the club being rebranded as the Gold Coast Bears, which would have also resulted in the creation of a new logo and the return of the famous red and black colors. At the end of 2017, the bid ultimately failed with the licence being purchased by Rebecca Frizelle and Darryl Kelly.

In 2025, Moore's dream of North Sydney returning to the NRL in some capacity became a reality as the club's bid to form a partnership with the Western Australian consortium was granted the licence by the NRL to become the competition's 18th team.
