= Nate Myles =

Australia international rugby league footballer

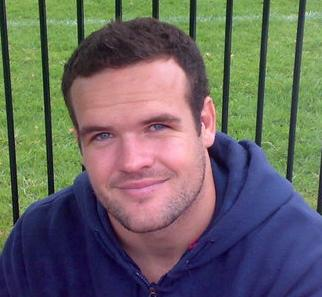

Personal information
- Born: 24 June 1985 (age 41) Cairns, Queensland, Australia

Playing information
- Height: 187 cm (6 ft 2 in)
- Weight: 107 kg (16 st 12 lb)
- Position: Prop, Second-row, Lock
Club
Years	Team	Pld	T	G	FG	P
2005–06	Canterbury Bulldogs	40	2	0	0	8
2007–11	Sydney Roosters	90	2	0	0	8
2012–15	Gold Coast Titans	75	3	0	0	12
2016–17	Manly Sea Eagles	26	0	0	0	0
2017	Melbourne Storm	3	0	0	0	0
	Total	234	7	0	0	28
Representative
Years	Team	Pld	T	G	FG	P
2006–17	Queensland	32	1	0	0	4
2007–11	Prime Minister's XIII	3	0	0	0	0
2010	NRL All Stars	1	0	0	0	0
2010–15	Australia	9	0	0	0	0

Nate Myles (born 24 June 1985) is an Australian former rugby league footballer who played in the 2000s and 2010s, he last played for the Melbourne Storm in the National Rugby League. A Queensland State of Origin and Australia national representative forward, he previously played for Canterbury-Bankstown, Sydney Roosters, Gold Coast Titans and Manly-Warringah.

== Personal life ==
Myles is married to actress Tessa James. In 2018 the couple welcomed their first child.

== Playing career ==
=== Canterbury-Bankstown ===
Myles was a Canterbury junior and a housemate of fellow future NRL stars Sonny Bill Williams and Johnathan Thurston. As 2004 NRL premiers, the Canterbury-Bankstown Bulldogs faced Super League IX champions, Leeds in the 2005 World Club Challenge. Myles played from the interchange bench in the Bulldogs' 32–39 loss.

Myles made his first grade debut for Canterbury in round 1 of the 2005 NRL season against St. George Illawarra at Telstra Stadium.

In 2006 he was picked to represent Queensland in the State of Origin competition. At club level, Myles played in Canterbury's 2006 preliminary final defeat against the Brisbane Broncos at the Sydney Football Stadium. This would be Myles last game for Canterbury and he joined the Sydney Roosters for the 2007 NRL season.

=== Sydney Roosters ===
Myles moved to the Sydney Roosters for the 2007 NRL season. In November 2006, Myles was charged with drink driving following a Melbourne Cup luncheon. Sydney Roosters imposed a fine of $10,000, 20 hours of community charity work and forced him to undergo alcohol counselling.

Myles first season at the club saw them miss the finals series after finishing 10th. In August 2008, Myles was named in the preliminary 46-man Kangaroos squad for the 2008 Rugby League World Cup.

In April 2009, he was named in the preliminary 25 man squad to represent Queensland in the opening State of Origin match for 2009. Following another alcohol-related incident, Myles was suspended for six matches by the NRL. At 8am on 5 July 2009, Myles was found drunk and naked on the fire escape of the Crowne Plaza in Terrigal, New South Wales. He had earlier tried to gain entry into one of the hotel's rooms, and had also defecated in the hotel's corridor. This incident was referenced by the media as "Dumpgate '09".

At club level, Myles made 17 appearances for the Sydney Roosters in the 2009 NRL season as the club finished last for the first time since 1966. In 2010, the club had a complete form reversal and reached the 2010 NRL Grand Final against St. George Illawarra. Myles played at second-row in the decider as the Roosters were defeated 32–8 at Telstra Stadium.

Myles played for Australia in the 2010 Four Nations tournament. In December 2010 he became engaged to Home and Away actress Tessa James. The pair wed on 23 December 2011.

=== Gold Coast Titans ===
Myles was selected to play in all three matches of the 2012 State of Origin series, being awarded the Wally Lewis Medal as man of the series, which was won by Queensland for the seventh consecutive year. At the 2012 Dally M Awards Myles was named the NRL's second-row forward of the year. He was also named the 2012 Gold Coast Titans season's best player and awarded the club's annual Paul Broughton Medal.

He was named a Titans co-captain for 2013 alongside Greg Bird. Myles was selected for Australia in the 2013 ANZAC Test and played from the interchange bench. In what was the first test match ever played in Canberra, New Zealand were defeated. Myles played all three games of the 2013 State of Origin series in which Queensland extended their record for consecutive series victories to eight.

In game 1 of the 2013 State of Origin series, Myles was involved in a fight with New South Wales player Paul Gallen. Gallen alleged that Myles had twisted his knee in the previous tackle. Gallen then punched Myles twice in the face. The memorable melee was one of the last significant Origin stoushes before punching was outlawed in all forms of the game.

=== Manly-Warringah ===
On 13 May 2015, Myles signed a three-year contract with the Manly Warringah Sea Eagles starting in 2016.

=== Melbourne Storm ===
On 14 June 2017, Myles announced he had signed a mid season transfer to the Melbourne Storm.

Myles initially played for the Storm's feeder team, Eastern Suburbs Tigers, playing against the Sunshine Coast Falcons at Suzuki Stadium, Langlands Park, the result going down to a field goal, Easts winning 17–16. On 8 July, he made his Storm debut against the Parramatta Eels in round 18 at AAMI Park.

On 19 November 2017, Myles announced his retirement from the NRL.

== Post-playing career ==
Following his retirement from playing, Myles has worked with the Queensland rugby league team during the annual State of Origin series under head coach and former teammate Billy Slater. He was also worked with the junior rugby league program at Hallam Secondary College. During the 2024 State of Origin series, Myles was given an official warning after he swore at NSW Player Joseph Sua'ali'i.

On 6 January 2025, Myles was named as coach for the Melbourne Storm Jersey Flegg squad.

== Statistics ==
Year	Team	Games	Tries	Pts
2005	Canterbury-Bankstown Bulldogs	19	1	4
2006	Canterbury-Bankstown Bulldogs	20	1	4
2007	Sydney Roosters	15		
2008	Sydney Roosters	17	1	4
2009	Sydney Roosters	17		
2010	Sydney Roosters	24		
2011	Sydney Roosters	17	1	4
2012	Gold Coast Titans	22	3	12
2013	Gold Coast Titans	19		
2014	Gold Coast Titans	18		
2015	Gold Coast Titans	16		
2016	Manly Warringah Sea Eagles	16		
2017	Manly Warringah Sea Eagles	10		
2017	Melbourne Storm	3		
	Totals	234	7	28
