= Roy and HG's State of Origin commentary =

Broadcast on the Triple J radio station to simulcast with the annual three-game rugby league State of Origin series, Australian comedians Roy and HG (played by John Doyle and Greig Pickhaver) provide a commentary of the match at hand. An extension of the duo's This Sporting Life radio program, also on Triple J, Roy and HG's use of comedy makes their sporting calls unique from that provided by other media sources, and has earned a cult following. With the duo's move to Triple M radio in 2009, and the end of This Sporting Life, the State of Origin commentary is currently on hiatus.

== Format ==
=== Build-up ===
At 7:30pm on the night of a State of Origin match, Triple J interrupts its normal evening broadcasts (Super Request) in New South Wales and Queensland, and the State of Origin coverage begins with a fanfare of horns. A lengthy introduction to State of Origin rugby league is given by "King Wally Otto in the Soundproof Booth" (a pseudonym for well-known Australian voice-over presenter Robbie McGregor). This introduction, which can last for 5 minutes or more, features King Wally Otto enthusiastically reading an elaborate Doyle and Pickhaver script, which more often than not culminates in a list of Former Origin Greats ("F.O.G.s"), and anecdotes about their achievements or foibles. It is also common for Otto to announce a 'theme' for the year's three game series, often to do with current events (such as the 2003 invasion of Iraq). A twist on this was when the 2006 series was heavily "sponsored" by fictitious Lakemba-based car dealership Frosty Lahood Motors Australia.

At the end of Otto's build-up to the game, he usually switches to a rhapsodic introduction for Roy and HG themselves, ending with the question "are you there...HG?" Taking his role of the 'sports announcer' of the pair, HG Nelson thanks King Wally Otto in the Soundproof Booth, welcomes listeners to their State of Origin coverage and provides further build-up to the game at hand. Nelson introduces the State of Origin contest as being played for the "highest principles on the planet"; those principles being "Peace through violence, harmony through brutality and getting everyone to shut-up and behave just like us or they’ll cop a boot up the date [buttocks] and a fist of fives."

During the first few minutes, Nelson's broadcasting partner, "Rampaging" Roy Slaven remains silent until eventually introduced to the airwaves by Nelson. Roy's character, a supposed former player of the game who takes more of an 'expert commentary' role to Nelson's main call, is often restrained with his opening remarks; that is, until his enthusiasm for the game provokes a passionate expression of opinion about the contest to Nelson and the listening audience. The pair talk about the build-up to the game for approximately half an hour, often with Slaven recounting supposed interactions he had with stars of the league (he professes intimate friendships with virtually every current and former player of rugby league). An example of one of these (obviously fictional) exchanges was before the first game of the 2006 series which New South Wales was entering after winning the previous three in a row. With many media commentators declaring the concept of State of Origin dead after such one-sided results, Roy contacted Wally Lewis for his thoughts on the upcoming series, to which he replied "oh, are they still playing that?"

=== Game commentary ===
Compared to the more traditional commentary on Channel 9 and ABC Radio's Grandstand, Roy and HG are often less restrained in their criticism of players and teams. This feature of their call may be off-putting for certain fans who are sensitive to hearing players in their team criticised (being called a "goose", etc.), but is generally taken in the humorous way it is intended. The duo's commentary, and particularly Slaven's, often features over the top reactions to the game at hand, such as calling for entire teams of players to be sacked after losses, or even questioning whether losing teams will ever win another match in the future.

Though Doyle was born in New South Wales, and both currently reside within the state, this gives seemingly little influence to any commentary 'bias'. Roy and HG are also quick to relish the more 'unsavoury' actions of players on the field which are ignored or downplayed by more traditional commentators. This includes spitting, dacking, wedgies, gouging, groping, pig-rooting, fighting and roughhousing in general.

Roy and HG's State of Origin commentary is also noteworthy for the use of nicknames to refer to many of players on the field, rather than their surnames. While standard, well-known nicknames such as "Sticky" Ricky Stuart and "Mad Dog" MacDougall are used, the duo are renowned for their creation and use of more obscure 'running joke'-type nicknames about players. A partial list of nicknames is presented below:

== Player nicknames ==
New South Wales State of Origin player nicknames
Player name	Roy and HG nickname	Reason for nickname
Jamie Ainscough	The Cough Drop	A play on the pronunciation of Ainscough's surname. He was also called "the prettiest sight in rugby league" due to his bizarre running style.
Braith Anasta	The Black Hole	Roy and HG noted during one match that Anasta's effectiveness in the New South Wales defence was like a hole that Queensland players could break through with little trouble, "There's a hole out there, and it's called Anasta".
Braith Anasta	Death and Poison	A nickname picked up during the 2007 Origin series, Anasta made several errors with the ball after which Roy and HG suggesting that everything he touched turned to death and poison.
Braith Anasta	The Car Horn	Given to Anasta during the 2007 series as Roy and HG pointed out, the horn doesn't do anything for the car except make noise.
David Barnhill	Mockers	To "put the mocker on someone" is similar to a curse or a bad luck wish. Roy and HG nicknamed Barnhill "Mockers" because of the numerous losing grand final teams he had been a part of.
Greg Bird	Tweet Tweet	Occasionally named Tweet Tweet because of his last name.
Greg Bird	The Personality	For growing a moustache and therefore having more personality than anyone else on the field
Tim Brasher	The Boy/Man on the Bike	Brasher entered first grade while still in high school.
Danny Buderus	Butterball Buderus	Possibly because of his poor ball handling in a State of Origin match.
John Cartwright	The Burning Map	The television series Bonanza, whose protagonists were the Cartwright family, featured a burning map in its intro sequence.
Matt Cooper	The Brown Polish	Cooper was tackled several times in the first and second games of the 2007 series on top of some of the advertising paint on the playing field, most of which was black and red in colour, causing Cooper's face and legs to get covered in black/red/brown polish. Most of the other players ended up with this as well. This nickname also alludes to the coaching polish put on Cooper by his St George-Illawarra club coach Nathan Brown.
Laurie Daley	Tooley	In reference to an alleged dressing room incident following the Canberra Raiders' first Grand Final win in 1989 where Daley celebrated by allegedly popping his own "magnum" of champagne in full view of his teammates and then Prime Minister Bob Hawke. Tool is a slang term used often by Roy and HG for penis.
Jim Dymock	The Doctor's Feet	Due to Dymock's "sublime" kicking game, Roy posited that his feet were as educated as a doctor's.
Ben Elias	Back Door Benny	Often shortened to just "The Door." Elias occasionally attempted to pass the ball behind his back or "through the back door" with mixed success. This nickname alludes to Benny's alleged sexual predilections.
Ben Elias	The Crimea Look	During a 1990s State of Origin appearance, Elias suffered a nasty head gash during the game which required a bandage. By the end of the game, the wound was so bad that a lot of blood had seeped through the bandage and was all over his face and jersey. The Blues ended up winning the game and Elias's mother ran on the field to congratulate him. This post-match hug resulted in his mother being covered in blood too. The Roy and HG nickname is derived from Elias' appearance more resembling a warring soldier than a sportsman.
Andrew Ettingshausen	The Nudist	After nude pictures taken of Ettingshausen in the shower were published by Blue Magazine, he sued them for invasion of privacy. Also referred to as "The Flathead" in response to the nude dressing room photo. The flathead fish observed from above is said to have a similar profile to a penis. In Game 2, 1993, HG, Encouraged ET to "grease up and slip through" when running the ball back into the QLD defence.
Brad Fittler	Captain in a Cab, Adolf, About to cut loose	While captaining New South Wales, Fittler was found unconscious and incoherently drunk in front of a police station unable to communicate his name or address. After three hours, he was sober enough to remember his address and he was loaded into a cab by police officers. Early in his career, he was occasionally referred to as "Adolf" (i.e. Adolf Fittler).
Craig Fitzgibbon	Raw Bones	Named because of his bald head and thin bony physique, resembling a skeleton.
Bryan Fletcher	Old Man River	The nickname was given as a reference to his age, being one of the oldest players on the team.
Mark Gasnier	Fire Up Bitch!	Gasnier was fired from the 2004 New South Wales State of Origin team for leaving an obscene voice mail message on a woman's mobile phone after a 'bonding session'. The transcript of the phone message is as follows: "Where the fuck are you? There's four toey humans in the cab with sausages ready to spurt sauce. It's 20 to four...and you're in bed, fuck me. Fire up, you sad cunt." Roy and HG also shorten this nickname to variations such as "The F.U.B.", "Fubby" and "The Fubster".
Mark Gasnier	Shimmy, Shimmy, Whoosh!	From an NRL Pog describing Gasnier's step maneuver as the "Shimmy, Shimmy, Whoosh".
Mark Geyer	The Tap	He can run hot and cold or "turn it on" i.e. on-field violence. By extension, Geyer's younger brother Matt is nicknamed "Tap II."
Kurt Gidley	Giddy-Up Gidley	The younger brother of Matthew Gidley and has had the nickname handed down to him.
Kurt Gidley	Newcastle's Finest Slicer	Often shortened to just "The Slicer". Named after one particular match where Kurt constantly broke or "sliced" through Queensland's defensive line. Also prior to becoming a first grade footballer, Kurt was an apprentice butcher.
Matthew Gidley	Giddy-Up Gidley	See above.
Ryan Girdler	"No Sex Please" I'm Ryan Girdler	Often shortened to "No Sex Please". A reference to the play No Sex Please, We're British. Taken from Girdler's reluctance on The Footy Show to interact with any females when engaged to be married (Girdler ended up not marrying).
Craig Gower	The Man in the Taxi	After Gower was involved in an off-field incident involving a taxi.
Jarryd Hayne	Hip Head Hayne	In the 2008 State of Origin series, Hayne was briefly knocked out because he hit his head against another player's hip.
Terry Hill	Fizzer	During a particular game, Roy and HG noted how most plays involving Hill "fizzed out" due to factors such as his poor ball-handling skills. From that point onwards, he was dubbed "Fizzer Hill" with the pair shouting "FIZZ! FIZZ! FIZZ!" whenever he was passed the ball. During his final appearances for New South Wales, the older Hill was lampooned by Slaven for being "too old, too slow, too stupid" whenever he was brought into play. Slaven and Nelson surmised that Hill wasn't in the New South Wales side for his sporting talent, but rather for his personal qualities (calling him "the funniest man in rugby league"). In his 1996 book Petrol, Bait, Ammo & Ice, HG mused "Imagine the mayhem the world would have to endure if Terry couldn't find an outlet for his enthusiasm in the League"." Also known in earlier years as "Teasing Terry Hill" or "The Teaser".
Terry Hill	The Lobster Fisherman/Lobster Expert	Derived from an incident after his playing days when Hill was caught stealing lobsters from pots that didn't belong to him, resulting in Hill facing the Magistrates Court.
Nathan Hindmarsh	Money Box Man	This nickname is drawn from the term "coin slot" to describe an "arse crack" or buttock cleavage. Hindmarsh's shorts would often be worn low, with his buttocks exposed to the television cameras.
John Hopoate	Stinkfist	Although he was described by a 2005 newspaper story as "the most suspended player of the modern era", Hopoate is best known for the incidents that lead to his sacking from the Wests Tigers in 2001. During a 2001 match against the North Queensland Cowboys, Hopoate attempted to insert his finger into the anuses of Paul Bowman and Glenn Morrison in an effort to unsettle them. This incident, and the following rugby league judiciary decision to ban him for 12 weeks, was widely publicised by the sporting and mainstream media and left Hopoate humiliated. The Roy and HG nickname is drawn from the 1996 Tool song Stinkfist and is a result of Roy and HG asking their listeners what his boxing name should be (as he left rugby league to pursue a career in boxing). "Stinkfist" (often shortened to "Stinky") is one of the suggestions. Another was "Dr. Digit".
Rodney Howe	Needles/The Chemist	In 1998, Howe was suspended for 22 weeks for using a prohibited steroid in the treatment of a leg injury.
Andrew Johns	The Unmade Bed	Roy and HG once read a feature story which detailed some of Johns' on-tour habits. Specifically, the article mentioned Johns' technique of going to bed fully dressed in his traveling clothes following a late night out on the town. This allowed him to get an extra 15 minutes sleep the next morning, though his crumpled clothes took upon an "unmade bed" appearance for the following day. While playing in the 1997 Grand Final with a punctured lung, he was also granted the name "One Bung Lung." Was also called "The Third Chair", a reference to the band Silverchair who are from Newcastle (the same city where the Newcastle Knights are based where Johns played throughout his career in the NRL).
Ben Kennedy	The President	The nickname was given after a comment made by Slaven or Nelson remarking how much Kennedy looks like his namesake, former U.S. President John F. Kennedy. In reality, the burly, bald Kennedy looks nothing like JFK but Roy and HG ran with this joke by making references to Air Force One and The White House when Kennedy had possession of the ball. Other nicknames include "Ken Bennedy" and "Dead Kennedy" (in reference to the punk band Dead Kennedys).
Glenn Lazarus	The Brick with Eyes	The nickname is because of Lazarus' large, solid physique. Roy and HG have also called him "Dr Death." The United Kingdom's The Sun newspaper once got this name wrong and called him "The Brick with Ears." He was also referred to as the "Besser Block of Rugby League"
Adam MacDougall	Mad Dog MacDougall; Drugs	Was referred to as "Drugs" after testing positive to performance-enhancing drugs in 1998.
Willie Mason	The Brains Trust	The nickname originated in the aftermath of the 2004 Canterbury Bulldogs sex scandal, in which Mason was labeled a central figure. His club later claimed that Mason has attention deficit hyperactivity disorder . After his move to the Sydney Roosters, he was labelled the "New Face of the Eastern Suburbs".
Steve Menzies	Methuselah	Menzies played in the New South Wales team until 2006, when he was aged 32 years old. During his final appearances, having played professional rugby league since 1993, Roy and HG made exaggerated references to Menzies' age such as calling him "Methuselah" claiming he was around 800 years old and had made 400 Origin appearances.
Steve Mortimer	The Prince of Darkness	A play on his sinister appearance and demeanour.
Mark O'Meley	Dencorub Man	A reference to the rumour that O'Meley rubbed Dencorub (a deep heat cream) on his bald head before the game to fire himself up. More recently, they have referred to him as "Mad Dog O'Meley" in the absence of Adam MacDougall.
Michael O'Connor	Tiberius	In reference to his nickname, "Snoz" and the famous Roman nose.
Tommy Raudonikis	"Raw-don-neek-us"	Pronounced "Ra-donny-kiss", Roy and HG render Tommy's name as "Raw-don-neek-us" which they claim to be the correct "Greek" pronunciation. Raudonikis was of Lithuanian descent. Also known as "Tom Tomato" due to his tomato-growing prowess.
Steve Roach	Blockhead	A variation of his normal nickname, "Blocker".
Ian Roberts	"Totally" Ian Roberts	Named after a fictitious fashion label that Slaven and Nelson invented for the well dressed, openly gay Ian Roberts.
Paul Sironen	The Buttocks	Sironen's short shorts made his buttocks look quite prominent. Another memorable feature of the commentary was HG saying "don't the poms hate Sirro, Roy?" - a reference to the fear he struck in the English players when representing Australia. Roy's replies to this leading question included, "More than a bar of soap, HG. ", "More than a tube of toothpaste, HG." and "More than a warm bath, HG."
Jason Stevens	Stupid Stevens	A crude nickname which was used after Stevens made a number of mistakes in a match.
Jason Stevens	Praise the Lord Pastor Stevens	A reference to his Christian faith.
Brett Stewart	The Try Scoring Wizard	Due to his impressive performance in scoring a try in his debut match in 2007, the name is taken from his NRL Tazo. This is sometimes shortened to "The Wizard" or interchanged with "The Try-Scoring Machine." He was also lampooned during the 2008 Origin Series for failing to break tackles, something he is ordinarily a master of.
Timana Tahu	Tim Tam Tahu	Named after the Australian chocolate biscuit brand, Tim Tams.
Shaun Timmins	Tea Bag Timmins	Named so due to the phonetic sound of Timmins and its similarity with tea bag.
Anthony Watmough	Sponge-Kiss	During his first Origin appearance in Game I 2005, Watmough was used only sparingly off the bench and played little game time. He also had a very little impact in the second row. After the game, he was dropped and replaced by Steven Menzies. Ever since that poor performance, Roy and HG have dubbed him the Sponge-Kiss to signify his lack of impact. Also known as "AVO" Watmough
Rod Wishart	The Fastest Man in the League	Made after Wishart, a winger, was chased down by the "Ungrateful Head", a front row forward, after breaking away. Roy and HG also suggest that people should "put the kettle on" or "put the cat out" when Wishart gets the ball - implying that nothing happens when Wishart is in possession.
Craig Young	Constable Craig; Fat Albert	"Constable Craig" is a reference to his employment in the New South Wales police force. "Fat Albert" results from combining his actual nickname "Albert" with his girth and the resulting facial resemblance to the cartoon character of the same name.

Queensland State of Origin player nicknames
Player name	Roy and HG nickname	Reason for nickname
Gary Belcher	Snakey Substances	In reference to Belcher's running style, which would often be used to slide through the opposition's defensive line in a snake-like manner.
Martin Bella	The Squirrel Gripper	In reference to Bella gaining a match winning last minute penalty conversion which was awarded because Des Hasler retaliated after Bella had grabbed and squeezed his testicles during a tackle. See "squirrel grip" elsewhere in this article.
Steven Bell	Ding Dong Bell	A play on the word "bell" and his last nam.
Wayne Bennett	Skeletor	A reference to his taciturn manner. Also called "Supercoach Bennett".
Petero Civoniceva	Fridge and a Freezer	Rhyming slang with Civoniceva's actual surname. Roy and HG also usually intentionally mispronounce his surname as "Siv-ee-ya-see-na" and sometimes introduce other variations such as "Petrol SeventyCentsALitre" and "Petero SecondReceiver". Also nicknamed "The Rear Admiral" from his habit of turning his back to the defensive line when he is about to be tackled.
Petero Civoniceva	The Second Keel	Reference to Steve Price's nickname of the pair being the direction of the Queensland pack.
Mark Coyne	The Two Dollar Coit	A play on his surname's pronunciation, coit is another slang term used by Roy and HG to mean anus. His older brother Peter has been referred to as "One Dollar Coit".
Michael Crocker	Betty Crocker	Reference to the fact that he shares his surname with the famous cookbook brand.
Brett Dallas	Debbie Does	Named after the 1978 pornographic film Debbie Does Dallas.
Brett Dallas	The Grassy Knoll	U.S. President John F. Kennedy was assassinated in the city of Dallas. One of the conspiracy theories going around was that the shot was fired from behind a grassy knoll close to the motorcade route. Dallas also had a habit of bursting into the open out of nowhere, a fact which Roy and HG claim is similar to the unexpected nature of Kennedy's assassination.
Greg Dowling	Dish-Head Dowling; Wing-Nut Dowling	The name "Dish-Head" implies that Dowling's face is concave as his nose has been broken. The name "Wing-Nut" refers to the fact that Dowling has large ears.
John Doyle	Roy	John Doyle is the real name of the actor behind the Roy Slaven character, so the duo nicknamed the rugby league player accordingly.
Andrew Gee	Older Than His Grandpa	Due to his age, Roy and HG would often refer to him as being "Older Than His Grandpa".
Trevor Gillmeister	Chock-a-Block Full of Angry Pills	Gillmeister was a player who seemed especially fired up around Origin time and Roy and HG's explanation for this was the consumption of "angry pills" in the dressing room just before kick-off.
Michael Hancock	Three Knees	Roy and HG hypothesised that Hancock used his large "middle leg" to his advantage in the game of rugby league, such as slowing play-the-balls by holding down opposing players with it when making tackles. He was also sometimes referred to as "Tripod".
Ben Hannant	The Ambitious Walk	HG often comments that Hannant is a very slow runner. When Hannant takes a hit-up, HG will often comment "God he's slow isn't he?" Variations of the nickname include "The Ambitious Walker" and "The Hiker".
Paul Hauff	The Clip Clop Club	Nickname derived from pronunciation of his surname (i.e. horse hoof).
Tony Hearn	The Penalty Puller	Roy and HG regarded Hearn as a player who frequently faked injury to fool the referee into penalising the New South Wales team. Later in his career, Roy and HG referred to Hearn as a mentor-like figure who coaches young players how to best "pull penalties" in State of Origin matches. In his 1996 book Petrol, Bait, Ammo & Ice, HG spuriously claimed "[Hearn] is the only player to be able to lay on a headbutt at State of Origin level and then pull the following penalty when the all-in broke out".
Ben Ikin	Tina Turner	Derived from the homophonic qualities of Ikin and Ike & Tina Turner.
Peter Jackson	Inaction Jackson	Based on his tendency to bludge on the wing or the blindside.
Adrian Lam	Baa Baa Lam	Nicknamed Baa Baa due to Lam being his surname.
Martin Lang	The Ungrateful Head	The head of Martin Lang, who ran with an erratic style, would be violently and spectacularly whiplashed backwards after a collision with a tackling opponent.
Allan Langer	Deborah Kerr	Actress Deborah Kerr starred opposite Yul Brynner in the 1956 film The King and I. This nickname is derived from Langer's on-field partnership with Brisbane Broncos and Maroons five-eighth Wally Lewis, who is nicknamed "The King." The duo often referred to Lewis as "K.W. Lewis".
Gary Larson	The Far Side	Larson shares his name as the cartoonist responsible for the popular comic strip, The Far Side.
Darren Lockyer	Silk	Reference to Lockyer's ability to glide smoothly through the defensive line.
Mal Meninga	Chicken George	Mal was known to eat chicken for breakfast, lunch and dinner and every meal in between. His teammates gave him the nickname ‘Chicken George'.
Adam Mogg	Moggball	Mogg's debut Origin match was the second game of the 2006 series, which was being played at the same time as the soccer World Cup. Mogg scored two tries in an unexpected Queensland thrashing which led Roy to declare "you can talk about Wogball, but this is "Moggball"."
Julian O'Neill	The Poo in the Shoe	O'Neill, who has a history of off-field misconduct including two DUI charges and urinating under casino blackjack tables on two separate occasions, was involved in a 1999 pre-season incident which led to him being banned from a Dubbo hotel. Following years of personal and professional turmoil, O'Neill trashed the Dubbo hotel room by smearing the walls with faeces. A direct quote from the horse's mouth describing a further bad deed from the night was "Hey Schlossie, I just shat in your shoe."
Julian O'Neill	The Golden Shower Boy	Used in reference to O'Neill urinating under a Jupiters Casino card table on two occasions.
Robbie O'Davis	Roids O'Davis	Nicknamed after O'Davis was suspended for 22 weeks early in his career after it was discovered he had used anabolic steroids.
Steve Price	Price Attack	Named after the Australian discount haircare and beauty chain, Roy and HG would make the "woo woo woo!" noise of a storefront siren whenever Price would take a hit up.
Steve Price	The Keel	Roy and HG hailed Price as the direction of the Queensland pack and later awarded Petero Civoniceva with the title of "Second Keel". The pair lamented that New South Wales would have no keel while Queensland had two.
Wendell Sailor	Ding Dong Dell	Also, at one time, Roy and HG would shout "HELLO SAILOR!" every time Wendell was passed the ball.
Clinton Schifcofske	Shkkkkkk	Just about everyone in Australian rugby league media pronounces Schficofske's name differently and few got it right (it's pronounced "Shif-oss-key") and his nickname was a play on this. Roy and HG also deliberately mispronounce his name as "Shiv-cough-skee".
Dale Shearer	The 180B Man	Named after a late 1970s car model, Roy and HG would remark how Shearer "offers so many options on the park he's like a Datsun 180B". An extension of this joke was that Shearer offered "too many options", which led to no action because of indecision.
Matt Sing	On Song	Nicknamed so due to his surname, Sing.
Cameron Smith	Call-Me-Cam	Smith, in the first half his career, preferred to be known as "Cam" rather than his full given name.
Darren Smith	Cheese and Chives	Smiths Chips is a large manufacturer of potato chips in Australia.
Jason Smith	Salt and Vinegar	Jason is the brother of Darren Smith (see above).
Dan Stains	The Underpants	Roy and HG began calling Stains "Underpant Stains" after suggesting that no matter how the Blues might wash, they just can't get those "Dan Stains" out. This was soon shortened to "The Underpants."
Brent Tate	Show Us Ya Date Tate	Roy and HG were instrumental in popularising the usage of the slang term "date", which means anus. After being tackled, Tate occasionally rises to play the ball after lying on his back with his legs open and inadvertently pointing towards the camera. After scoring two tries in Game III of the 2003 State of Origin series, Roy and HG proclaimed "everybody's talking Tate!" This would prove to be a popular phrase which would be modified to "Nobody’s Talking Tate" during less impressive performances.
Sam Thaiday	The Personality	Also "The Character" for his wild hair and rollickg take ups with hair and knees flying.
Brad Thorn	Thorn in the Side	A reference to his surname.
Lote Tuqiri	Plum Daiquiri	A nickname derived from Lote's unusual Fijian surname. Another version is "Strawberry Daiquiri".
Kerrod Walters	Prune	Because the Walters brothers were "fruit of the same loins", each got a "fruity" moniker
Kevin Walters	Cumquat	The brother of Kerrod. (see above)
Steve Walters	Quince	The brother of Kerrod and Kevin, completing the fruit motif.
Shane Webcke	BigPond	Telstra BigPond is a popular web provider in Australia.

In addition to the players, Roy and HG frequently refer to two former top grade referees: Kelvin Jeffes and Moghseen Jadwat, ironically describing them as the two best officials ever to grace the sport (in actuality, Jadwat's top-grade career was decidedly short (1997-8) whilst Jeffes has only controlled one Origin fixture). This is in contrast to Roy and HG's typical opinions of refereeing staff (e.g. Bill Harrigan, which is often vocally critical beyond the norm for sports commentators).
