= 1990 State of Origin series =

Australian rugby league series

- Won by: New South Wales (3rd title)
- Series margin: 2 - 1
- Points scored: 50
- Attendance: 98,451 (ave. 32,817 per match)
- Top points scorer(s): Gary Belcher (8)
- Top try scorer(s): Mark McGaw (2)

The 1990 State of Origin series saw the ninth time that the annual three-game series between New South Wales and Queensland representative rugby league football teams was contested entirely under "state of origin" selection rules. It was the first year that the Australian Rugby League took an Origin match to Melbourne to showcase the code in Victoria. New South Wales broke an eight-game losing streak in game I and took the series for the first time since 1986.

== Games ==
=== Game One ===
Wednesday, 9 May 1990

New South Wales	8–0	Queensland
(4 - 1 t) Mark McGaw (4 - 2 g) Michael O'Connor	(Report)

Sydney Football Stadium, Sydney
Attendance: 41,235
Referee: David Manson
Player of the Match: Ben Elias

Game I at the Sydney Football Stadium was a typical Origin arm-wrestle and resulted in the lowest score in the series' 10-year history to that point. Queensland's Wally Lewis withdrew pre-match due to a hamstring tear (only the 2nd Origin match he had missed in the series' history), Maroon's hero Gene Miles had retired and Tony Currie, Michael Hancock and Kerrod Walters were all out with injuries.

New South Wales' captain Benny Elias played what was regarded as his finest representative performance with a copybook dummy-half display. Blues' centre Mark "Sparkles" McGaw scored the only try of the match. He outplayed his opposite, the Mal Meninga and pulled off a covering tackle on winger Alan McIndoe that was so comprehensive that both McIndoe's boots came flying from his feet. The win was the Blues' first since the post-series exhibition match in 1987.

=== Game Two ===
Wednesday, 30 May 1990

New South Wales	12–6	Queensland
(4 - 1 t) Ricky Stuart (4 - 1 t) Brad Mackay (4 - 2 g) Rod Wishart	(Report)	Les Kiss (4 - 1 t); Mal Meninga (2 - 1 g)

Olympic Park, Melbourne
Attendance: 25,800
Referee: Greg McCallum
Player of the Match: Ricky Stuart

The public relations exercise to showcase the game in Melbourne proved a success with a sell-out crowd of 25,800 cramming into Olympic Park. The game was highlighted by NSW halfback Ricky Stuart racing 70 metres to score, easily outpacing Qld winger Les Kiss who made no ground on the former Wallaby.

Queensland halfback Allan Langer's stealing of the ball from Blues replacement prop Glenn Lazarus helped spell the end of three years of Queensland State of Origin dominance which had included two consecutive series clean sweeps from 1988. Langer's steal was a defining moment giving Rod Wishart the chance to put the Blues ahead 8-6. Shortly afterwards Brad Mackay swooped on an intercept and streaked away for the try that put the game out of reach for the Maroons.

=== Game Three ===
Wednesday, 13 June 1990

Queensland	14–10	New South Wales
(8 - 1 t, 2 g) Gary Belcher (4 - 1 t) Steve Jackson (2 - 1 g) Wally Lewis	(Report)	Glenn Lazarus (4 - 1 t); Mark McGaw (4 - 1 t); Rod Wishart (2 - 1 g)

Lang Park, Brisbane
Attendance: 31,416
Referee: David Manson
Player of the Match: Bob Lindner

In Game III the Blues led 10-4 after just 24 minutes and looked set for a series whitewash. Then the Maroons clawed back to 10-all early in the second half with their Origin "King" Wally Lewis landing a wide conversion after Gary Belcher had taken the earlier kicks. Western Suburbs Magpies' forward Steve Jackson who the year before had scored a Grand Final try to give his club the Canberra Raiders the premiership, scored an almost identical try to give Queensland the game and a face-saving sole victory in the series.

== Teams ==
=== New South Wales ===
Position	Game 1	Game 2	Game 3
Fullback	Andrew Ettingshausen		
Wing	Rod Wishart		
Centre	Michael O'Connor	Brad Mackay	Michael O'Connor
Centre	Mark McGaw		
Wing	Ricky Walford	Graham Lyons	
Five-eighth	Laurie Daley	Des Hasler	Brad Mackay
Halfback	Ricky Stuart		
Prop	Steve Roach		Glenn Lazarus
Hooker	Ben Elias (c)		
Prop	Ian Roberts		
Second Row	David Gillespie		
Second Row	Bruce McGuire		
Lock	Bradley Clyde		
Replacement	Glenn Lazarus		Mark Sargent
Replacement	Paul Sironen		
Replacement	Geoff Toovey	Andrew Farrar	
Replacement	Graham Lyons	Brad Fittler	Greg Alexander
Coach	Jack Gibson		

=== Queensland ===
Position	Game 1	Game 2	Game 3
Fullback	Gary Belcher		
Wing	Alan McIndoe		
Centre	Dale Shearer		
Centre	Mal Meninga		Peter Jackson
Wing	Les Kiss		Willie Carne
Five-eighth	Michael Hagan	Wally Lewis (c)	
Halfback	Allan Langer		
Prop	Martin Bella		
Hooker	Steve Walters	Kerrod Walters	
Prop	Dan Stains	Sam Backo	
Second Row	Paul Vautin (c)	Dan Stains	Trevor Gillmeister
Second Row	Wally Fullerton-Smith	Gary Coyne	
Lock	Bob Lindner		
Replacement	Mark Coyne	Trevor Gillmeister	Kevin Walters
Replacement	Kevin Walters	Andrew Gee	Michael Hagan
Replacement	Gary Coyne	Mark Coyne	Andrew Gee
Replacement	Trevor Gillmeister	Kevin Walters	Steve Jackson
Coach	Arthur Beetson		

== See also ==
- 1990 NSWRL season

== Sources ==
- Big League's 25 Years of Origin Collectors' Edition, News Magazines, Surry Hills, Sydney
