= 1989 State of Origin series =

Australian rugby league series

- Won by: Queensland (6th series title)
- Series margin: 3-0
- Points scored: 130
- Attendance: 106,356 (ave. 35,452 per match)
- Top points scorer(s): Mal Meninga (18)
- Top try scorer(s): Michael Hancock (4)

The 1989 State of Origin series was the eighth time the annual three-game series between New South Wales and Queensland was contested entirely under 'state of origin' selection rules. It was Queensland's second consecutive Origin clean-sweep and an unpleasant inauguration for New South Wales' new coach Jack Gibson who, along with a new captain in Gavin Miller and eight new players, was brought into a dramatically overhauled Blues side that had lost its five last State of Origin matches.

== Game I ==
Jack Gibson had never before coached at representative level and turned from Origin commentator to coach. He was pitted against his good friend and golfing buddy Arthur Beetson who had been recalled as Queensland coach to take over from Wayne Bennett. Experienced Blues Peter Sterling and Wayne Pearce declared their reluctance to be selected for the Kangaroo tour of New Zealand following the series and were declared non-selections by the NSWRL (effectively ending their representative careers), while King Wally's greatest Origin nemesis Brett Kenny, had retired from representative football after suffering an ACL injury in 1988. As such, New South Wales were forced to elevate some debutantes and only four players in game I of 1989 were in the squad from game III of 1988 - Garry Jack, John Ferguson, Des Hasler and Andrew Ettingshausen. According to Ch.9 Brisbane commentator Andrew Thomas, Jack Gibson said before the game saying that Queensland had their two best players Wally Lewis and Allan Langer playing for them while his two best players, Peter Sterling and Wayne Pearce, would be watching from the grandstand.

Two surprise non-selections for NSW was that of tough front rowers Steve Roach (Balmain) and Penrith's Peter Kelly, with Gibson pulling a surprise by naming ball playing Penrith second rower John Cartwright for his Origin debut in the unfamiliar position of prop.

Queensland's 19 year old Brisbane Broncos winger Michael Hancock became the youngest State of Origin footballer to that point from either state that night. Hancock was one of five Maroons making their Origin debut in Game 1, the others being his Broncos team mate and hooker Kerrod Walters, Cronulla-Sutherland forward Dan Stains in the front row ahead of Brisbane's Sam Backo who had been struggling for form, reserve forward Gary Coyne from the Canberra Raiders, and in-form Newcastle Knights half Michael Hagan was selected for his debut off the bench after finding that three reserve grade games for Brisbane Wests in 1982 qualified him to play for Queensland. Hagan, the younger brother of 1960s Test centre Bob Hagan and a dual Premiership winner with Canterbury-Bankstown in 1985 and 1988, became the first Knights player selected to play State of Origin.

Gavin Miller had not represented for New South Wales since 1983, but was selected and posted as skipper. Canberra teenagers Laurie Daley and Bradley Clyde made their debut at the intimidating Lang Park "Cauldron", with Daley also handed the goal kicking duties despite the experienced Terry Lamb in the team at Five-eighth. Daley showed his nerves when missed his first shot on goal, a penalty from only 15 metres out from the posts and directly in front when Qld were leading 6–0. Also making their debut for NSW were Broncos centre Chris Johns playing on the wing, South Sydney forward Mario Fenech at hooker, 1986 Kangaroo Tourist and 1988 World Cup final second rower Paul Sironen from Balmain, with Canberra prop Glenn Lazarus and 1986 Kangaroo tourist, Penrith halfback Greg Alexander, on the bench. NSW in fact went in with three backs on the bench and only one forward. Chris Johns, actually born in Brisbane and normally a centre with the Brisbane Broncos (but grew up in Sydney and was graded with St George in 1984), made history by becoming the first player chosen to represent NSW Origin while playing for a Queensland-based club.

Tuesday, May 23, 1989

Queensland	36–6	New South Wales
(8 - 2 t) Michael Hancock (16 - 2 t, 4 g) Mal Meninga (4 - 1 t) Alan McIndoe (4 - 1 t) Allan Langer (4 - 1 t) Bob Lindner	(Report)	Andrew Ettingshausen (4 - 1 t); Laurie Daley (2 - 1 g)

Lang Park
Attendance: 33,088
Referee: Mick Stone
Player of the Match: Martin Bella

The game seemed to start well for the Blues as Maroons winger Alan McIndoe knocked on in-goal fielding the kick off. From the ensuing line drop out, Qld quickly gained the upper hand. Wally Lewis put up a towering goal line drop out that went 58 metres on the fly and was let bounce by NSW fullback Garry Jack. Unfortunately for NSW, the ball continued bouncing towards their own line and Jack finally fielded the ball just two metres inside his own quarter, allowing the Qld defence to trap NSW in their own half. From there things just went from bad to worse for NSW. A breakout from their own half started by Lewis who passed to Currie who passed on to Hancock for a 30 metre run before an offside penalty saw Langer run across field before putting a flying McIndoe over in the south-west corner. After Meninga's conversion, NSW were able to put together some attacking plays with almost 10 minutes of pressure on the Queensland line, forcing another two goal line dropouts, but the Maroons defence held strong. Then with Qld leading 6–0, a penalty right in front and just 14 metres saw NSW with a chance to put points on the board, but Laurie Daley badly hooked his kick wide of the posts. And from there the floodgates opened despite Lewis being sent to the sin-bin for 5 minutes. Michael Hancock scored two tries in his Origin debut, while Mal Meninga signalled his return to representative football with two tries and four goals of his own and in the process overtake dual rugby international outside back Michael O'Connor (NSW) as the greatest point scorer in Origin history to that point (Meninga's tries were his first in Origin since Game 1 of the 1983 series, and doubled his Origin total to that point). Also scoring for the Maroons were Langer and Bobby Lindner. However, on the night there was none better than Martin Bella whose powerhouse performance in the front row gave the likes of Wally Lewis and Allan Langer the room they needed and earned him the Man of the Match award.

While the Maroon debutants such as Michael Hancock, Kerrod Walters and Dan Stains had seemingly handled the pressure of Origin easily, only Bradley Clyde and Paul Sironen of the many Blues new faces seemed to handle the pressure in what was New South Wales' biggest Origin losing margin: 30 points (it had been 18–nil at half time). Only a late try to reserve back Andrew Ettingshausen who grounded a kick from his Cronulla club mate Gavin Miller, prevented NSW from losing the game 36–0. ET's try was converted by Daley who unlike his first kick, had settled his nerves and put the conversion straight over the black dot.

== Game II ==
Wednesday, June 14, 1989

Queensland	16–12	New South Wales
(4 - 1 t) Michael Hancock (4 - 1 t) Kerrod Walters (4 - 1 t) Wally Lewis (2 - 1 g) Mal Meninga (2 - 1 g) Gary Belcher	(Report)	Laurie Daley(4 - 1 t); Chris Johns (4 - 1 t); Greg Alexander (4 - 2 g)

Sydney Football Stadium
Attendance: 40,000
Referee: David Manson
Player of the Match: Wally Lewis

Queensland wrapped up the 1989 series in game II in probably their most courageous effort in Origin history. They lost Allan Langer with a broken leg, Mal Meninga with a fractured eye socket and Paul Vautin with an elbow injury by half-time. In the second half, Michael Hancock came off with a bruised shoulder while Bob Lindner played on with a fracture in his ankle which he carried for much of the match before retiring five minutes from the end, leaving the Maroons down to 12 men.

Lindner, who stayed on the field despite his injury as there were no reserves left, claimed it was the toughest match in which he had played and Wally Lewis, who scored a memorable 40-metre try, rated it as Queensland's greatest performance. Maroon's coach Arthur Beetson was irate at the Blues' intimidating tactics, claiming New South Wales hard man Peter Kelly was allowed to get away with illegal tackling by Queensland referee David Manson.

The day before the game, some NSW players entered Jack Gibson's hotel room to talk to him and were reportedly shocked to find their coach entertaining the enemy. In the room, long-time friends Gibson and Maroons coach Arthur Beetson were enjoying a drink and playing cards. The same situation had happened in reverse before Game 1 in Brisbane with Wally Lewis, Gene Miles and Paul Vautin entering Beetson's hotel room the night before the game only to find their coach playing cards with Gibson.

Despite the 36-6 thrashing in Game 1, the NSW public got behind their team which resulted in a capacity crowd of 40,000 attending Game 2 at the Sydney Football Stadium. To date this was the second largest Sydney crowd in Origin history after the 42,048 that had attended Game 2 of the 1987 series at the Sydney Cricket Ground.

== Game III ==
Wednesday, June 28, 1989

Queensland	36–16	New South Wales
(16 - 2 t, 4 g) Dale Shearer (4 - 1 t) Gary Belcher (4 - 1 t) Alan McIndoe (4 - 1 t) Michael Hancock (4 - 1 t) Kerrod Walters (4 - 1 t) Tony Currie	(Report)	Des Hasler (4 - 1 t); David Trewhella (4 - 1 t); Bruce McGuire (4 - 1 t); Michael O'Connor (4 - 2 g)

Lang Park
Attendance: 33,268
Referee: Greg McCallum
Player of the Match: Kerrod Walters

The first points came after Queensland hooker Kerrod Walters made a break from dummy half within his own half and passed on to his winger Alan McIndoe to run forty metres to score. Australian test winger Dale Shearer, who had moved from the bench to starting in the centres replacing the injured Mal Meninga and also took over the goal kicking duties despite the 1988 NSWRL season's top point scorer Gary Belcher playing at fullback, missed the sideline conversion attempt so the score remained 4 nil in favour of the Maroons. After collecting the ball from a scrum win within ten metres of Queensland's line, Blues halfback Greg Alexander dashed forth before passing it to his halves partner Des Hasler who dived over next to the uprights to equalize. Michael O'Connor made no mistake with the conversion and New South Wales were in front 6 - 4. The Maroons hit back when they got the ball after a Blues mistake and from over forty metres out, Michael Hagan kicked downfield for Shearer to beat the defence to and score in the left corner. Shearer missed this conversion as well so Queensland led 8 - 6. New South Wales responded with another try after lock forward Brad Mackay made a break about twenty metres out from Queensland's line before offloading in a tackle to Eastern Suburbs hooker David Trewhella coming through in support to score behind the posts. O'Connor's successful conversion put the score at 12 - 8 in favour of the Blues. New South Wales then crossed twice but were called back both times so the score remained unchanged for the half-time break.

Queensland opened the scoring in the second half when Kerrod Walters again made a break from dummy half, running about forty metres before getting the ball out to support players, who passed on to a flying Michael Hancock to dive over in the left corner. Shearer's third conversion attempt was successful so Queensland had regained the lead at 14 - 12. Garry Jack fumbled as he stooped to pick up a Wally Lewis grubber and Walters dived on the loose ball to score the Maroons' next try. Shearer kicked the extras, giving Queensland a 20 - 12 lead. The Maroons' next try came after playing the ball over twenty metres out and keeping it alive, three players passing from tackles until it went to Gary Belcher who broke for the try-line and scored near the uprights. Shearer's kick was successful so Queensland led 26 - 12. The points kept coming for Queensland who started another movement from within their own half, putting the ball through the hands to players coming through in support until it made its way out to Tony Currie to dive over in the left corner. They didn't stop there though, with Shearer at dummy-half and in an attacking position passing the ball to Lewis before running around him to re-collect it and race through almost untouched to score again. Shearer then converted his own try and the score was 36 - 12.

== Teams ==
=== New South Wales ===
Position	Game 1	Game 2	Game 3
Fullback	Garry Jack		
Wing	John Ferguson		
Centre	Andrew Farrar	Andrew Ettingshausen	Brian Johnston
Centre	Laurie Daley		Chris Johns
Wing	Chris Johns		Michael O'Connor
Five-eighth	Terry Lamb	Chris Mortimer	Des Hasler
Halfback	Des Hasler	Greg Alexander	
Prop	Paul Dunn		Bruce McGuire
Hooker	Mario Fenech		David Trewhella
Prop	John Cartwright	Peter Kelly	
Second Row	Gavin Miller (c)		
Second Row	Paul Sironen	Bruce McGuire	Mark Geyer
Lock	Bradley Clyde		Brad Mackay
Replacement	Andrew Ettingshausen	Brad Mackay	Terry Matterson
Replacement	Greg Alexander	Alan Wilson	
Replacement	Glenn Lazarus	Des Hasler	Phil Blake
Replacement	Chris Mortimer	John Cartwright	
Coach	Jack Gibson		

=== Queensland ===
Position	Game 1	Game 2	Game 3
Fullback	Gary Belcher		
Wing	Alan McIndoe		
Centre	Tony Currie		
Centre	Mal Meninga		Dale Shearer
Wing	Michael Hancock		
Five-eighth	Wally Lewis (c)		
Halfback	Allan Langer		Michael Hagan
Prop	Martin Bella		
Hooker	Kerrod Walters		
Prop	Dan Stains	Sam Backo	
Second Row	Paul Vautin		Dan Stains
Second Row	Gene Miles		
Lock	Bob Lindner		Paul Vautin
Replacement	Dale Shearer		Kevin Walters
Replacement	Michael Hagan		Peter Jackson
Replacement	Trevor Gillmeister		
Replacement	Gary Coyne		
Coach	Arthur Beetson		
