= David Trewhella =

Australian rugby league footballer

Personal information
- Born: 9 June 1962 (age 64) Maitland, New South Wales, Australia

Playing information
- Position: Halfback, Lock, Hooker
Club
Years	Team	Pld	T	G	FG	P
198?–85	Redcliffe
1986–91	Eastern Suburbs	81	7	0	0	28
1992	Cronulla-Sutherland	9	0	0	0	0
	Total	90	7	0	0	28
Representative
Years	Team	Pld	T	G	FG	P
1988–89	NSW Country	2	0	0	0	0
1988–89	New South Wales	2	1	0	0	4
1988	President's XIII	1	0	0	0	0
1989	Australia	1	0	0	0	0

David Trewhella (born 9 June 1962, Maitland, New South Wales) is an Australian former rugby league footballer who played in the 1980s and 1990s. After playing junior football in Newcastle, he started his senior football career in Queensland, playing for Redcliffe.

== Club career ==
While at Redcliffe, Trewhella was named their player of the year in 1984. In 1986 he moved to Sydney where he played for the Eastern Suburbs Roosters. A halfback when playing for the Dolphins, he was moved to the forwards by Easts coach Arthur Beetson, playing mostly at lock and later as a hooker. Trewhella played 81 games for the Roosters from 1986 to 1991.

Trewhella's last season of first grade football was with the Cronulla-Sutherland Sharks in 1992. He only played in 9 games for Cronulla before retiring at the end of the season. Trewhella's first NSWRL coach at Easts (Beetson) was also his coach for his last season with the Sharks.

== Representative career ==
Despite having played most of his senior football in the Brisbane Rugby League competition, Trewhella was ruled to be eligible to play for New South Wales in State of Origin after having first play senior football as a teenager in the Newcastle Rugby League. He was selected on the bench for Game 1 of the 1988 State of Origin series at the Sydney Football Stadium, and at hooker in Game 3 of the 1989 series at Lang Park in Brisbane where he scored his only try in representative football. Trewhella was also selected for the 1988 replay, but ruled himself out with a back injury.

Following the 1989 Origin series (and thanks to injuries to South Sydney's Mario Fenech and Balmain's Benny Elias), Trewhella was selected as a hooker in the 20 man squad for the mid-season 1989 Kangaroo Tour of New Zealand. He played in 3 of the 6 games on tour, but was not selected for any of the tests against New Zealand with coach Bob Fulton preferring Queensland and Brisbane Broncos rake Kerrod Walters in the role.

Trewhella also played 2 games for Country Origin in 1988 and 1989.

== Personal life ==
Trewhella ran a clothing and swimwear company, Charra Holdings, during his playing career.
