= Lowes Menswear =

Australian menswear retail company

Lowes Manhattan Pty Ltd
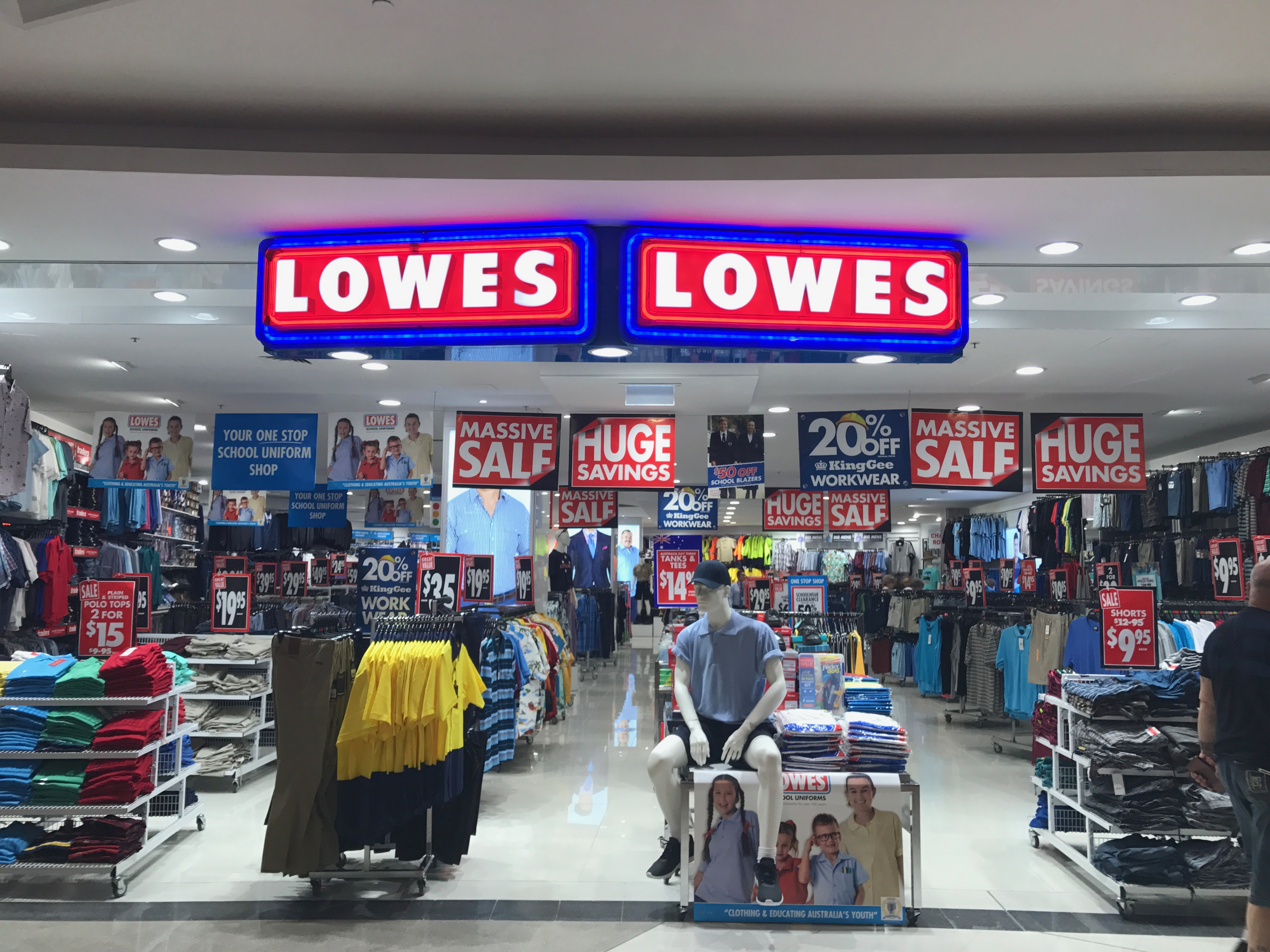
- Lowes Miranda store
- Industry: Retail
- Founded: 1898; 128 years ago
- Founder: William Lowe (1898) Hans Mueller (1948)
- Headquarters: Sydney, Australia
- Number of locations: ▲206 (2017); 181 (2012)
- Area served: Australia, New Zealand
- Key people: Linda Penn (MD) (2017)
- Products: Apparel
- Number of employees: 1,900 (2017)
- Website: lowes.com.au

Lowes Menswear, also currently known as Lowes Manhattan Pty Ltd, is a private, family-owned leading Australian menswear and retail chain established in 1898 by William Lowe. There are now over 200 stores nationally because of expansion driven by Hans Mueller who established Lowes Manhattan Pty Ltd in 1948. Lowes primarily sells casual wear, big men's, corporate workwear, school wear and have expanded into the senior market.

== Product range ==
Lowes sells school wear, casual wear, workwear, business and formal wear, men's outsize clothing, socks, underwear, shoes and accessories. In addition, their range includes sportswear and clothes for older people, fragrances and gifts, household items, confectionery and stationery.

== Operations ==
As of January 2017, the Lowes chain employed 1900 employees and includes 206 shop locations across all Australian states and mainland territories; this is a 13% increase from the 181 stores in the chain in 2012. The largest of the chain's stores is in Bankstown.

The three main shops in New South Wales include Westfield Miranda, Bankstown and MacArthur. Lowes’ head office and warehouse is located in Arncliffe.

== Advertising ==
Lowes is known for featuring rugby league personalities in their commercials, most notably Ray Warren, Peter Sterling, Phil Gould, Wally Lewis, Paul Harragon, Matthew Johns, Andrew Johns, Ben Elias, Steve Roach, Ray Hadley, Paul Sironen, Paul Vautin, and Darryl Brohman. These television ads proclaiming getting good priced, quality clothing “at Lowes” became famous in Sydney during the 1980s and 1990s.

== Future ==
Hans Mueller died in December 2016. His son, Jeffery Mueller, and daughter, Linda Penn, are now directors of Lowes.

== See also ==
- List of oldest companies in Australia
