= Lauren Bella =

Australian rules footballer

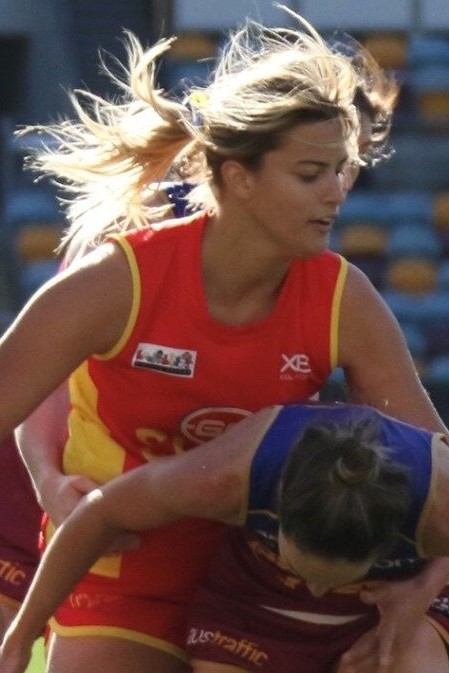
- Bella with Gold Coast

Personal information
- Born: 12 September 2000 (age 26); Mackay, Queensland
- Original team: Bond University (QAFLW)
- Draft: No. 45, 2018 AFL Women's draft
- Debut: Round 1, 2019, Brisbane vs. Greater Western Sydney, at Moreton Bay Central Sports Complex
- Height: 188 cm (6 ft 2 in)
- Position: Ruck

Club information
- Current club: Carlton

Playing career^{1}
Years	Club	Games (Goals)
2019	Brisbane	3 (0)
2020–2025	Gold Coast	66 (1)
2026–	Carlton	0 (0)
Total		69 (1)
- ^{1} Playing statistics correct to the end of the 2025 season.

Lauren Bella (born 12 September 2000) is an Australian rules footballer playing for the Carlton in the AFL Women's competition (AFLW). She has previously played for Brisbane and Gold Coast.

== Early life ==
Bella was born in Mackay, Queensland. Her father, Anthony, was a professional rugby league player for the South Queensland Crushers, and her uncle, Martin, also played rugby league professionally, representing Queensland in State of Origin as well as Australia in international competitions. Lauren began playing Australian rules football as a child, but had to stop playing when the local competition no longer allowed girls to compete in mixed teams with boys.

Bella then picked up netball in high school, and excelled so much that she was placed in the 2017/18 Netball Queensland's Elite Development Program. Despite finding success in netball, she returned to play football for Bakers Creek in the local AFL Mackay competition in 2017, and accepted an invitation to join the Gold Coast Suns Academy in 2018. She relocated to the Gold Coast in early 2018 to play club football for Bond University in the QAFLW competition and fulfil her academy commitments with the Suns. The decision paid off when the Brisbane Lions drafted her with the 45th pick in the 2018 AFL Women's draft.

== AFLW career ==
Bella made her debut in the Lions' round-one game against Greater Western Sydney at Moreton Bay Central Sports Complex on 3 February 2019.

In April 2019, Bella joined expansion club Gold Coast. In an interview she disclosed she is legally blind and requires a customised pair of contacts to see.

Bella had a breakout season in 2021, leading the league for hitouts up until the finals, as well as the average for the whole season.

=== Statistics ===
Statistics are correct to the end of the 2021 season.

Legend
G	Goals	K	Kicks	D	Disposals	T	Tackles
B	Behinds	H	Handballs	M	Marks	H/O	Hit-outs

Season	Team	No.	Games	Totals								Averages (per game)								Votes
Season	Team	No.	Games	G	B	K	H	D	M	T	H/O	G	B	K	H	D	M	T	H/O	Votes
2019	Brisbane	32	3	0	0	2	13	15	0	6	50	0.0	0.0	0.7	4.3	5.0	0.0	2.0	16.7	0
2020	Gold Coast	2	7	0	0	16	21	37	6	10	130^{‡}	0.0	0.0	2.3	3.0	5.3	0.9	1.4	18.6^{§}	0
2021	Gold Coast	2	9	0	0	26	32	58	12	19	190^{†}	0.0	0.0	2.9	3.6	6.4	1.3	2.1	21.1^{§}	0
Career			19	0	0	44	66	110	18	35	370	0.0	0.0	2.3	3.5	5.8	0.9	1.8	19.5	0

== Honours and achievements ==
Individual

- AFL Women's Rising Star nominee: 2021
