= Anthony Bella =

Australian rugby league footballer

Personal information
- Full name: Anthony Bella
- Born: 8 July 1973 (age 52) Queensland, Australia

Playing information
- Position: Prop, Second-row, Lock
Club
Years	Team	Pld	T	G	FG	P
1995–97	South Qld Crushers	25	1	0	0	4
- Source: As of 10 November 2023
- Relatives: Martin Bella (brother)

Anthony Bella is an Australian former professional rugby league footballer who played as a prop for the South Queensland Crushers in the ARL Premiership.

== Background ==
He is of Italian descent.

His daughter, Lauren Bella, plays in the AFLW for the Gold Coast Suns. He is also the brother of Australian international Martin Bella.

== Playing career ==
From a successful rugby league family, Bella signed for the new South Queensland Crushers team in 1995 and was part of their inaugural side on 11 March 1995. He played for the club for three seasons, playing in 25 first grade matches.

Bella also played in the club's final ever game which was against Western Suburbs in round 22 of the 1997 ARL season which South Queensland won 39–18 at the old Lang Park.
