= Billy Walters (rugby league) =

Australian rugby league footballer

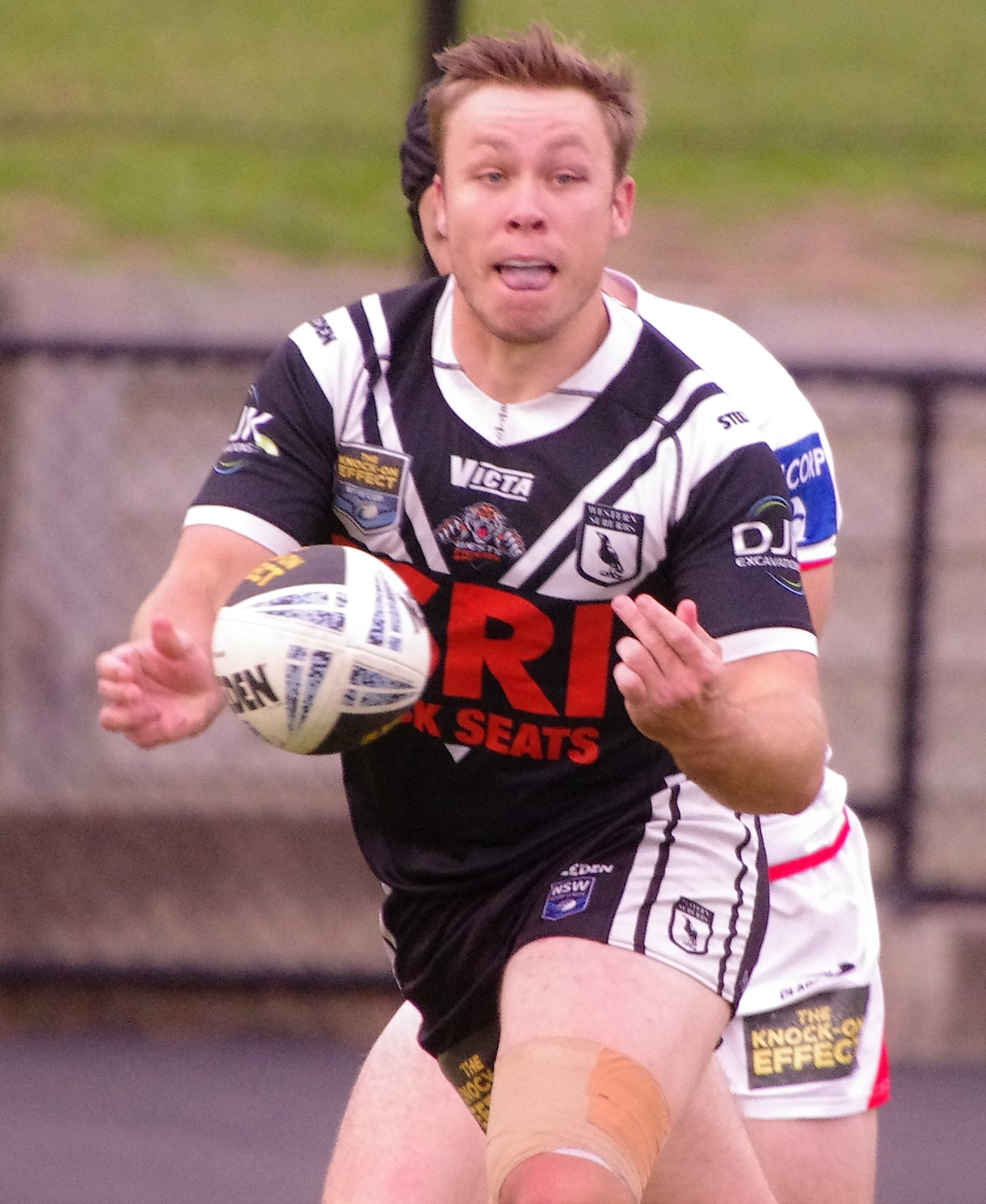

Personal information
- Full name: Billy Walters
- Born: 9 February 1994 (age 32) Brisbane, Queensland, Australia
- Height: 180 cm (5 ft 11 in)
- Weight: 88 kg (13 st 12 lb)

Playing information
- Position: Hooker, Five-eighth
Club
Years	Team	Pld	T	G	FG	P
2019	Melbourne Storm	2	0	0	0	0
2020–21	Wests Tigers	10	1	0	0	4
2022–	Brisbane Broncos	104	21	0	0	84
	Total	116	22	0	0	88
Representative
Years	Team	Pld	T	G	FG	P
2026	Prime Minister's XIII	1	1	0	0	4
- Source: As of 6 November 2026
- Father: Kevin Walters
- Relatives: Kerrod Walters (uncle); Steve Walters (uncle)

Billy Walters (born 9 February 1994) is an Australian professional rugby league footballer who plays as a hooker or five-eighth for the Brisbane Broncos in the National Rugby League.

He previously played for the Wests Tigers and the Melbourne Storm in the NRL.

== Background ==
Walters was born in Brisbane, Queensland, Australia.

At age four, Walters lost his mother Kim to breast cancer. Walters is the son of the Brisbane Broncos and former Maroons coach Kevin Walters and nephew of former Maroons players Kerrod Walters and Steve Walters. He attended Marist College Ashgrove, Brisbane.

== Playing career ==
=== 2019 ===
Walters made his NRL debut in round 16 for the Melbourne Storm against St. George Illawarra. He had his jersey (cap 196) presented to him by his father and former Melbourne Storm assistant coach Kevin Walters.

On 12 September, Walters signed a two-year deal with the Wests Tigers that would take him to the end of 2021.

=== 2020 ===
In round 1 of the 2020 NRL season, Walters made his club debut for the Wests Tigers, starting the match at hooker. In round 10 of the 2020 NRL season, Walters scored his first try in the top grade as Wests Tigers defeated his future club Brisbane 48-0 at Leichhardt Oval.

=== 2021 ===
On 6 September, Walters was one of five players who were released by the Wests Tigers club. He was subsequently signed by the Brisbane Broncos to play under the coaching of his father, Kevin, in 2022.

=== 2022 ===
Walters played 23 games for Brisbane in the 2022 NRL season as the club finished 9th on the table and missed the finals.

=== 2023 ===
In round 15 of the 2023 NRL season, Walters played his 50th NRL game. In round 24, Walters scored two tries for Brisbane in their 54-10 victory over Parramatta. In the 2023 preliminary final, Walters scored two tries in a 42-12 win over the New Zealand Warriors, helping the Brisbane club get to their first grand final in eight years. Walters played 26 matches for Brisbane in the 2023 NRL season. Walters played in Brisbane's 26-24 loss against Penrith in the 2023 NRL Grand Final.

=== 2024 ===
Walters played 23 games for Brisbane in the 2024 NRL season which saw the club miss the finals finishing 12th on the table.

=== 2025 ===
On 15 September, Brisbane announced that Walters would be ruled out of the rest of the finals after suffering "ACL damage" during the clubs win against Canberra. Due to this injury Walters missed the 2025 NRL grand final win over the Melbourne Storm but was invited by captain Adam Reynolds to help lift the Provan Summons Trophy.

=== 2026 ===
On 19 August 2026, the Broncos announced that Walters had re-signed with the club until the end of 2028. Walters played just seven matches for Brisbane in the 2026 NRL season as the club finished 14th on the table.

He made his Prime Minister's XIII début on 3 October 2026 in the 10-60 win over PNG Prime Minister's XIII in Port Moresby, scoring a try.

== Statistics ==
Year	Team	Games	Tries	Pts
2019	Melbourne Storm	2		
2020	Wests Tigers	8	1	4
2021	Wests Tigers	2		
2022	Brisbane Broncos	23	3	12
2023	Brisbane Broncos	26	6	24
2024	Brisbane Broncos	23	3	12
2025	Brisbane Broncos	25	7	28
2026	Brisbane Broncos	7	2	8
2027	Brisbane Broncos			
	Totals	116	22	88
