= Kevin Walters =

Australia international rugby league footballer and coach

Personal information
- Full name: Kevin David Walters
- Born: 20 October 1967 (age 59) Rockhampton, Queensland, Australia
- Height: 170 cm (5 ft 7 in)
- Weight: 83 kg (13 st 1 lb)

Playing information
- Position: Five-eighth, Halfback
Club
Years	Team	Pld	T	G	FG	P
1986	Ipswich Jets	4	1	0	0	4
1987–89	Canberra Raiders	50	9	0	0	36
1990–00	Brisbane Broncos	237	63	0	0	252
2001	Warrington Wolves	4	1	0	0	4
2001	Brisbane Broncos	4	2	0	0	8
	Total	299	76	0	0	304
Representative
Years	Team	Pld	T	G	FG	P
1989–99	Queensland	20	3	0	0	12
1990–98	Australia	11	1	0	0	4
1997	Queensland (SL)	3	0	0	0	0

Coaching information
Club
Years	Team	Gms	W	D	L	W%
2009–10	Catalans Dragons	63	25	0	38	40
2021–24	Brisbane Broncos	99	50	0	49	51
2027–	St Helens	0	0	0	0
	Total	162	75	0	87	46
Representative
Years	Team	Gms	W	D	L	W%
2016–19	Queensland	12	6	0	6	50
2025–26	Prime Minister's XIII	1	1	0	0	100
2025–	Australia	8	8	0	0	100
- Source: As of 22 November 2026
- Education: Bremer State High School; Ipswich Grammar School
- Relatives: Billy Walters (son); Steve Walters (brother); Kerrod Walters (brother)

Kevin David Walters (born 20 October 1967) is an Australian professional rugby league coach who is the head coach of both the Australia national rugby league team and St Helens, as well as a pundit (2017–2018, 2025–2026) for Fox League and a former professional rugby league footballer.

As a first-grade player for the Canberra Raiders and the Brisbane Broncos clubs, Walters was positioned at five-eighth or halfback in squads that cumulatively won six premiership titles. He played a few games for the Warrington Wolves in the British Super League, and the Ipswich Jets in the Brisbane Rugby League Premiership. Mostly in the 1990s, Walters represented Australia and Queensland.

Walters coached the Catalans Dragons (2009–2010) in the British Super League, Queensland in the State of Origin series (2016–2019), and the Brisbane Broncos (2021–2024) in the National Rugby League (NRL).

== Early life ==
Walters was born in Rockhampton, Queensland in 1967 to parents Kevin (died 2010) and Sandra (died 2013), who had a total of five children, all male: Brett, Steve, Andrew, Kevin and his twin Kerrod.

Walters attended Bremer State High School until gaining a sporting scholarship for Years 11 and 12 at Ipswich Grammar School, where he and his twin became school prefects. Walters grew up playing football with his brothers, in particular Steve and Kerrod, as well as Allan Langer. This combination of players was later referred to as "The Ipswich Connection".

== Playing career ==
From 1983 to 1984, Walters and three of his brothers (Brett, Steve and Kerrod) played for the Booval Swifts club before joining the Ipswich Jets in the Brisbane Rugby League Premiership competition in 1986. The next year, Walters followed Steve to the Canberra Raiders and the New South Wales Rugby League Premiership competition and remained until transferring to the Brisbane Broncos in 1990.

According to the Broncos, Kevin Walters holds the record for most finals' appearances and has played six times in premiership-winning teams; one with the Canberra Raiders (1989) and five with the Brisbane Broncos (1992, 1993, 1997, 1998 and 2000).

=== Canberra Raiders (1987–1989) ===
In the 1987 NSWRL season, Walters was a reserve in the Canberra Raiders' first grand final, which they lost 8–18 to the Manly-Warringah Sea Eagles at the Sydney Cricket Ground. Notwithstanding, he was named the Raiders' Rookie of the Year. In 1989, Walters played from the bench for Canberra in their 19–14 NSWRL Grand Final win against the Balmain Tigers at the Sydney Football Stadium.

Separately, Walters made his debut for the Queensland Maroons in the 1989 State of Origin series as a reserve in game 3 at Lang Park in Brisbane.

=== Brisbane Broncos (1990–2001) ===
Walters signed with the Brisbane Broncos in 1990 and played again alongside his twin brother. Head coach Wayne Bennett positioned Walters at five-eighth. Walters won the Broncos' 1990 Player of the Year award. At representative level, Walters played from the reserve bench for Queensland in all six games of the 1990 and the 1991 State of Origin series. He gained selection for the 1990 Kangaroo tour of Great Britain and France, but only played in tour matches against local sides rather than in Test matches. On the 1991 Kangaroo tour of Papua New Guinea, Walters made his test match debut; he and Kerrod became the first twin brothers to play rugby league for Australia.

Walters played in the 1992 Great Britain Lions tour of Australia and New Zealand that saw Australia retain The Ashes. Later that year, he was part of the Brisbane roster that won the 1992 Grand Final 28–8 against the St George Dragons at Sydney Football Stadium. Steve, Kevin and Kerrod Walters had already become the first trio of brothers to play for Queensland and Australia in 1992, and another milestone was achieved when all three were selected to tour in England with the Australian Rugby League World Cup squad. Australia won the final 10–6. Furthermore, Walters played in Brisbane's 1992 World Club Challenge win over the Wigan Warriors at Central Park in England. In 1993, he was part of Brisbane's 14–6 grand final victory over the St George Dragons at ANZ Stadium, Brisbane.

During the 1994 NSWRL season, Walters played at five-eighth for defending premiers Brisbane when they hosted and lost the 1994 World Club Challenge 14–20 to British champions Wigan Warriors at ANZ Stadium. At the end of the season, Walters went on the 1994 Kangaroo tour.

Walters also played in the 1997 Super League Grand Final victory for Brisbane. Although not a consistent player for the Maroons, Walters was part of the winning 1998 State of Origin team, dummying his way over for a try in the decider. That year, he played at five-eighth in the 1998 NRL grand final and won another premiership with the Broncos. When Allan Langer retired in 1999, Walters became the Brisbane Broncos' team captain. In the second match of the 1999 State of Origin series, he also captained Queensland. In the Broncos' 2000 NRL grand final 14–6 win against the Sydney Roosters at Stadium Australia, Walters captained at halfback, claiming one more premiership ring with the club before moving to England at the request of Allan Langer.

In 2001, Walters played four games for the Warrington Wolves in the English Super League. However, he and his family preferred to be in Australia, so Walters returned to the Brisbane Broncos, played five games and finished his playing career in the 2001 NRL season. In 2003, Walters was one of the first four former players inducted into the Broncos official Hall of Fame. In 2007, Walters was included in a club list of their best twenty best players to date.

== Coaching career ==
Following retirement as a player, Walters started his coaching career with the Toowoomba Clydesdales in the Queensland Cup regional competition as head coach (2001–2003), then the Brisbane Broncos in the NRL as assistant coach (2003–2005, 2015, 2018) and the Queensland Maroons in the State of Origin series as assistant coach (2006–2008, 2014–2015). Each of Walters' stints (2003–2005, 2015, 2018) as an assistant coach at Brisbane was under head coach Wayne Bennett. At the end of the 2005 season, after five successive years without a grand final appearance, Bennett decided to clean-out the coaching staff and removed long-time allies such as Walters, Gary Belcher and Glenn Lazarus. Walters then became head coach of the Ipswich Jets (2007–2008) in the Queensland Cup competition before securing a coaching contract in the English Super League with the France-based Catalans Dragons.

=== Catalans Dragons (2009–2010) ===
In 2009, Walters was appointed as the head coach of the Catalans Dragons. The team reached the qualifying semi-final for the Super League Grand Final and finished eighth in the competition after sixteen wins and sixteen losses during the Catalans Dragons 2009 season. In the 2010 season, the Dragons finished fourteenth (last) after six wins and twenty-one losses.

Returning to Australia, Walters was going to coach the Easts Tigers in the Queensland Cup in 2011, but instead joined the Melbourne Storm as an NRL assistant coach under Craig Bellamy, where he remained until the end of the 2013 NRL season. After Melbourne, Walters was appointed in 2014 as the halves' coach for the Newcastle Knights under Wayne Bennett.

=== Queensland Maroons (2016–2019) ===
In December 2015, Walters was appointed as head coach of the Queensland State of Origin team after Mal Meninga had to resign on becoming the Australian national rugby league team coach. In both 2016 and 2017, the Maroons achieved a 2–1 series victory over New South Wales. In the 2018 series, New South Wales won 2–1. In the 2019 State of Origin series, Queensland won the first game but suffered a 38–6 loss at Optus Stadium in the second game. In game 3, Queensland lost in the final twenty seconds after New South Wales scored a length of the field try. In September 2020, Walters resigned as the Maroons' head coach after being appointed head coach of the Brisbane Broncos.

=== Brisbane Broncos (2021–2024) ===
In the 2021 NRL season, Walters made his debut as an NRL head coach. His first victory as such was in round 3 when the Brisbane Broncos defeated the Canterbury-Bankstown Bulldogs 24–0 at Suncorp Stadium. By the end of 2021, Brisbane had won a total of seven matches and lost seventeen. They did not qualify for the finals and finished fourteenth on the NRL ladder. In 2022, former South Sydney Rabbitohs captain and prolific football-kicker Adam Reynolds joined Brisbane as halfback and team captain. They won a total of thirteen matches and lost eleven, but missed out on the finals again, finishing ninth.

Brisbane started 2023 with five consecutive wins, including the Battle for Brisbane 18–12 victory on 24 March at Suncorp Stadium against the Dolphins – coached by Walters' former mentor Wayne Bennett – in their inaugural NRL season. Brisbane extended Walters' contract until the end of the 2025 season. At the end of round 10, Brisbane was on top of the 2023 league ladder; however, that changed the following week. By round 25, Brisbane was back in first position and needed to defeat the Melbourne Storm to secure the minor premiership, but a decision to rest eleven of thirteen regular players that match contributed significantly to Brisbane finishing second (two weeks later) on the 2023 ladder after the Penrith Panthers, the minor and major premiers from 2022. Nevertheless, Brisbane went on to qualify for their first grand final in eight years. In the 2023 NRL Grand Final at Accor Stadium against the Penrith Panthers, Brisbane trailed 6–8 at half-time. In the second half, they scored three quick tries to lead 24–8. However, during the last twenty minutes, Brisbane suffered the worst collapse in NRL Grand Final history, losing 26–24.

Under Walters in the 2024 NRL season, Brisbane were unable to back up their feats from 2023 with the club, even after winning the 2024 NRL Pre-season Challenge, finishing twelfth on the table. Walters' position as Brisbane head coach came under heavy scrutiny by the media. The club conducted an internal review after the end of the regular season, and Walters was terminated from his coaching position on 26 September 2024.

=== Australia (2025–2026) ===
Walters was head coach of the Australia national rugby league team for the 2025 Kangaroo tour of England. Australia won the series 3–0. Walters will lead the Australia through the 2026 Rugby League World Cup.

=== St Helens (2027) ===
On 20 August 2026, it was announced that Walters signed a three-year contract as head coach of St Helens in the Super League for the 2027 season onwards.

== Personal life ==
Walters is a carpenter by trade, completing his apprenticeship with MBA Group Training in Canberra. Walters married long-term partner Narelle Bristow in 2012 and together they have two children, Harry (born 2003) and Ava (born 2005). In total, Walters has five children from two marriages; all of whom have played rugby league.

In January 1991, Walters married Kim Alison Facer and together had three children: Jack, Billy (a qualified carpenter) and Jett. Kim died from breast cancer in 1998. With Dr Cherrell Hirst, the then director of the Wesley Breast Clinic, Walters launched The Wesley Hospital Kim Walters Choices Program – a free community service that offers support to people diagnosed with cancer – in Brisbane. In 2017, the program's name changed to The Wesley Hospital Choices Cancer Support Centre with Walters continuing as Patron.

== Honours ==
Player

- 1987: NSWRL Grand Final runner-up – Canberra Raiders
- 1989: State of Origin series winner – Queensland
- 1989: NSWRL Grand Final winner – Canberra Raiders
- 1990: Paul Morgan Medal – Brisbane Broncos
- 1991: State of Origin series winner – Queensland
- 1992: Ashes Series winner – Australia
- 1992: NSWRL Minor Premiers – Brisbane Broncos
- 1992: NSWRL Grand Final winner – Brisbane Broncos
- 1992: World Club Challenge winner – Brisbane Broncos
- 1992: Rugby League World Cup winner – Australia
- 1993: NSWRL Grand Final winner – Brisbane Broncos
- 1993: Trans-Tasman Test series winner – Australia
- 1994: World Club Challenge runner-up – Brisbane Broncos
- 1995: State of Origin series winner – Queensland
- 1997: Super League Minor Premiers – Brisbane Broncos
- 1997: Super League Grand Final winner – Brisbane Broncos
- 1997: World Club Champions – Brisbane Broncos
- 1998: State of Origin series winner – Queensland
- 1998: NRL Minor Premiers – Brisbane Broncos
- 1998: NRL Grand Final winner – Brisbane Broncos
- 1999–2000: Brisbane Broncos Club Captain
- 2000: NRL Minor Premiers – Brisbane Broncos
- 2000: NRL Grand Final winner – Brisbane Broncos

Individual

- 2000: Australian Sports Medal for contributions to Australia's international standing in rugby league.

Coaching

- 2011: NRL Minor Premiers – Melbourne Storm (assistant coach)
- 2012: NRL Grand Final winner – Melbourne Storm (assistant coach)
- 2013: World Club Challenge winner – Melbourne Storm (assistant coach)
- 2016: State of Origin series winner – Queensland
- 2017: State of Origin series winner – Queensland
- 2023: NRL Grand Final runner-up – Brisbane Broncos
- 2024: NRL Pre-season Challenge winner – Brisbane Broncos
- 2025: Ashes Series winner – Australia
- 2026: World Cup winner - Australia
