= Sam Backo =

Australian rugby league footballer (1961–2025)

Personal information
- Full name: Samson Backo
- Born: 1 January 1961 Ingham, Queensland, Australia
- Died: 3 August 2025 (aged 64) Cairns North, Queensland, Australia

Playing information
- Height: 188 cm (6 ft 2 in)
- Weight: 115 kg (18 st 2 lb)
- Position: Prop
Club
Years	Team	Pld	T	G	FG	P
1980–82	Fortitude Valley
1983–88	Canberra Raiders	115	15	0	0	60
1988–89	Leeds	18	1	0	0	4
1989–90	Brisbane Broncos	20	3	0	0	12
	Total	153	19	0	0	76
Representative
Years	Team	Pld	T	G	FG	P
1988–90	Queensland	7	3	0	0	12
1988–89	Australia	6	3	0	0	12

Samson Backo (1 January 1961 – 3 August 2025) was an Australian professional rugby league footballer who played as a prop in the 1980s and 1990s.

Named as one of the greatest Aboriginal players of the 20th century, he represented Australia and Queensland, and played club football in the New South Wales Rugby League premiership for the Canberra Raiders and Brisbane Broncos, primarily as a prop forward. Backo was the first Australian forward to score tries in all three Tests of an Ashes series, and following his retirement was named in an Indigenous Australian team of the century.

== Early career ==
Former chairwoman of the Council for Aboriginal Reconciliation, Evelyn Scott gave birth to Sam Backo on 1 January 1961. Originally from North Queensland township, Ingham he was a forward for Cairns in the Queensland Rugby League's Northern Division before moving south to Woden Valley in the New South Wales Country Rugby League's Group 8 competition in 1981. The following year he returned to his home state to play for Yeppoon in the Central Division competition.

== BRL and Canberra ==
After playing in the Brisbane Rugby League premiership for Fortitude Valley, in 1983 Backo was given his first opportunity in the Sydney Rugby League premiership with the Canberra Raiders in their second season. He made his début in March and went on to play a handful of games that season. From 1984, Backo was a regular member of the starting line-up at Canberra and in 1987 appeared in his, and the club's, first grand final, which was lost to the Manly-Warringah Sea Eagles.

While in his final season at Canberra, Backo was first selected to play State of Origin football for the Queensland Maroons in the 1988 series. He played in all three games at prop forward, scoring one try in game II and two tries in game III. Queensland won the series in a three-game whitewash. In games II and III Backo won consecutive man-of-the-match awards, one of only a handful of players to do so. During the 1988 Great Britain Lions tour Backo was selected to make his test match debut at prop forward in the first of the Ashes series against Great Britain in Sydney, scoring a try. He went on to become the first Australian forward to score tries in all three Tests of an Ashes series, and at the time he was only the second Australian player to do so after legendary winger Ken Irvine. At the end of the 1988 NSWRL season Backo was the Dally M front rower of the year. A late season injury playing for Canberra saw him miss selection in Australia's World Cup Final winning team.

== RFL and Brisbane ==
Moving to England, Backo played in the 1988–89 Rugby Football League season for Leeds. On Sunday 16 October 1988 he played as an interchange, replacing prop Hugh Waddell, in Leeds' 33–12 victory over Castleford in the 1988 Yorkshire Cup Final at Headingley, Leeds.

Backo's final two seasons of top-level football, 1989 and 1990, were spent in Queensland, with the Brisbane Broncos. He was selected to go on the 1989 Kangaroo Tour of New Zealand. Backo also played in a further four games for the Maroons – games II and III of the 1989 State of Origin series, and games II and III of the 1990 series – despite his knee problems, which limited his participation with his club to only five appearances during 1990 and eventually forced his retirement at the end of the season. Although selected for the 1990 Australia team to play France in the NSW country town of Parkes, he was forced to withdraw because of his ongoing knee injury. In total, Backo played in six Tests and scored three tries. In 1991, Backo made a short-lived return to football to play for Logan Scorpions in the Brisbane competition.

== Post-playing life ==
Backo was awarded the Australian Sports Medal in 2000 for his contribution to Australia's standing in rugby league. The Indigenous Team of the Century was announced in 2001 with Backo included in the starting line-up which also included Arthur Beetson, Gorden Tallis and John Ferguson. In 2004, Backo was named in the Canberra Raiders' All Indigenous team.

== Personal life ==
Backo had a daughter with dancer Lillian Crombie, actress Elaine Crombie.

His son, Daniel Backo, was signed to the North Queensland Cowboys but did not make an NRL appearance.

=== Illness and death ===
On 2 April 2023, it was reported that Backo had suffered a heart attack the previous day and was in a critical condition in a Cairns hospital. Rugby league identities Wally Lewis, Trevor Gillmeister, Steve Renouf and Darryl Brohman were among those who offered support to Backo and his family upon learning the news.

Backo died from melioidosis at Cairns Hospital, on 3 August 2025, at the age of 64. He had been diagnosed with the bacterial infection in April of that year.
