= Peter Kelly (rugby league) =

Australian rugby league footballer

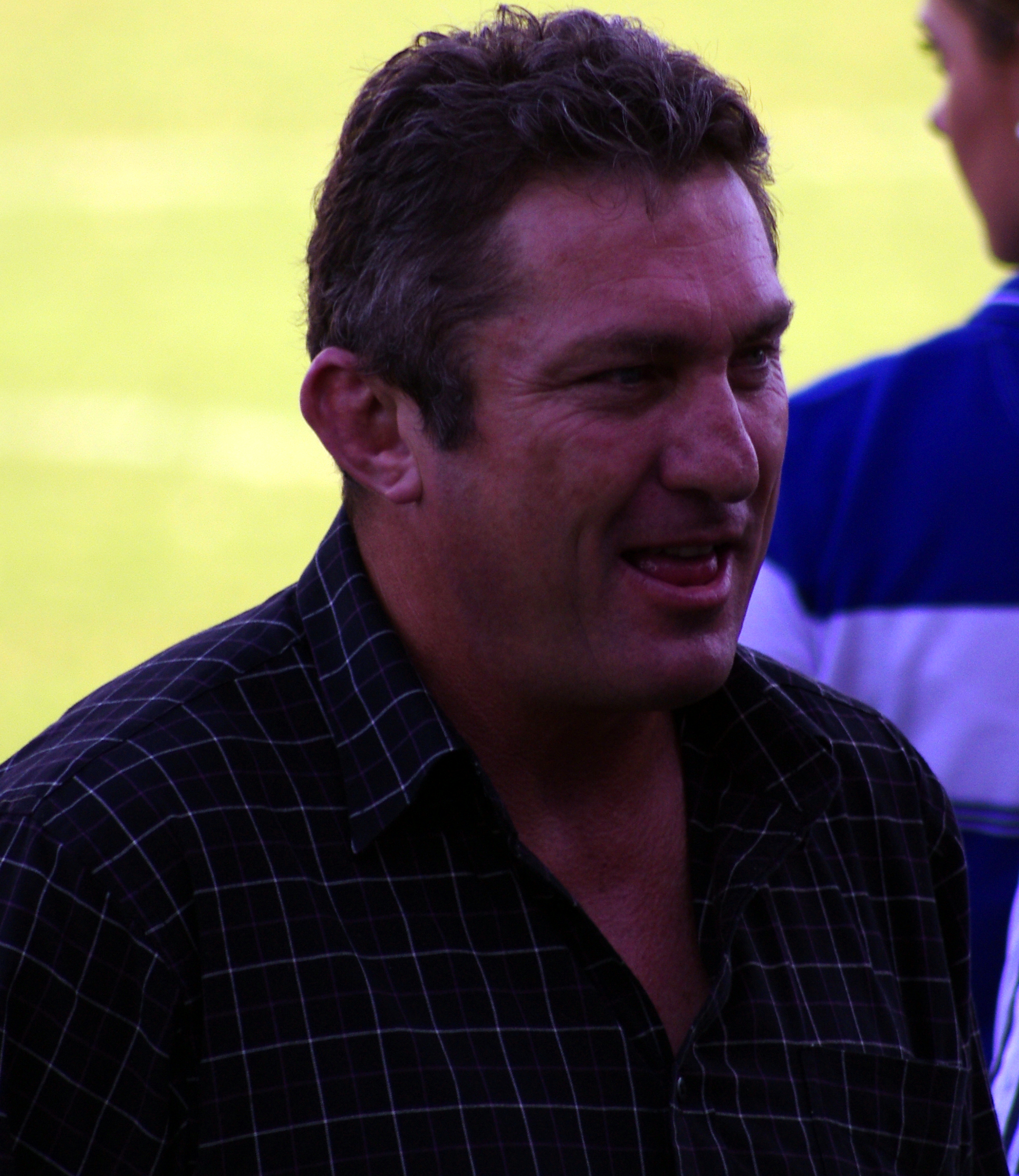

Personal information
- Born: 17 September 1959 (age 67)

Playing information
- Height: 180 cm (5 ft 11 in)
- Weight: 96 kg (15 st 2 lb)
- Position: Prop
Club
Years	Team	Pld	T	G	FG	P
1982–83	Newtown Jets	33	5	0	0	17
1984–87	Canterbury-Bankstown	69	2	0	0	8
1988–90	Penrith Panthers	40	1	0	0	4
	Total	142	8	0	0	29
Representative
Years	Team	Pld	T	G	FG	P
1983–89	NSW Country	4	0	0	0	0
1989	New South Wales	2	0	0	0	0

Peter Kelly (born 17 September 1959) is an Australian former professional rugby league footballer who played in the 1980s and 1990s. Originating from the New South Wales south coast town of Eden, he played front-row forward in the NSWRL Premiership for Newtown, Canterbury-Bankstown and the Penrith Panthers. A noted "hard man" he won two premierships with Canterbury and was a two-time New South Wales State of Origin representative.

== Playing career ==
Kelly was selected to represent New South Wales in the front-row for games II and III of the 1989 State of Origin series.

Kelly appeared in three Grand Finals for Canterbury, the two Premiership-winning teams of 1984 and 1985, and the 1986 runners-up. Kelly was man of the match in the 1984 NSWRL Grand Final and in retrospect was awarded the Clive Churchill Medal during rugby league's centenary celebrations in 2008.
