= Steve Roach (rugby league) =

Australia international rugby league footballer

Personal information
- Full name: Stephen David Roach
- Born: 24 April 1962 (age 64) Wollongong, New South Wales, Australia

Playing information
- Height: 188 cm (6 ft 2 in)
- Weight: 16 st 12 lb (107 kg)
- Position: Prop
Club
Years	Team	Pld	T	G	FG	P
1982–92	Balmain Tigers	186	12	0	0	48
1988	Warrington	20	1	0	0	4
	Total	206	13	0	0	52
Representative
Years	Team	Pld	T	G	FG	P
1984–91	New South Wales	17	0	0	0	0
1985–91	Australia	19	3	0	0	12

Stephen David Roach (born 24 April 1962), nicknamed Blocker or Blocker Roach, is an Australian former professional rugby league who played as a prop forward in the 1980s and early 1990s.

He made thirty-nine representative appearances for the Australian national team in Tests, World Cup and New South Wales State of Origin matches between 1985 and 1991. His football career was followed by a period as a commentator.

== Background ==
Roach was born in Wollongong, New South Wales, Australia.

== Club career ==
Roach played his early rugby league for Wests Illawarra and was signed by the Balmain Tigers in 1982. He quickly advanced to first grade and in 1983 was part of the Balmain side which made the semi-finals for the first time since 1977. Between then and 1992 Roach played 185 first grade games for the Tigers. 1987 was almost completely wiped out for Roach due to a serious knee injury and though he returned to excellent form in 1988 he was cited for a tackle on Penrith's Chris Mortimer suspended for four weeks, missing the 1988 finals including the Grand Final loss to Canterbury.

In the 1989 club season his combination with Paul Sironen, Benny Elias and Wayne Pearce was one of the strongest packs in club rugby league history and the side dominated opposing forwards. In the 1989 Grand Final, after having led Canberra 12 points to 2 at half-time, the Tigers were run down. Roach and Sironen were replaced by coach Warren Ryan late in the 2nd half and when the game ultimately went into extra time they were unable to return and with their strikepower gone in the added period Canberra were able to overpower Balmain 19–14. In 1991 his club form showed some decline but he again managed national selection and his experience was vital to the improvement of a side needing reorganisation after they suffered a shocking start to the club season. After an ankle injury in 1991 he was also troubled by a knee injury in 1992 which would prove to be his last club season.

== Representative career ==
State representative honours first came his way in 1984 when he was called into the New South Wales Blues side for all three games of that year's State of Origin series. Thereafter barring injury (which ruled him out of the 1987 series) and his surprise omission in 1989 (which saw NSW suffer their second straight 3–0 defeat by Queensland), he was generally a regular Blues starter and he made 17 State of Origin appearances until Game 2 of the 1991 series. When Jack Gibson was New South Wales coach in 1989 and 1990, he reportedly threatened the NSWRL with resignation from the position if Roach was selected in the side, though the Balmain front rower was selected in 1990 and went on to win their first series since their 3–0 win in 1986.

In 1985, Roach became the 562nd player to represent Australia when he made his national representative début in the first Test in Brisbane against New Zealand. His excellent club form for Balmain in 1986 ensured his place on the 1986 Kangaroo tour where he appeared in two Tests and seven minor tour matches, though his tour was interrupted after he suffered a dislocated elbow in a match against St. Helens before the second Ashes test against Great Britain.

Citations and despatches to the sin-bin in the 1989 club season may have contributed to his omission by State selectors from the Blues squad of that year however powerful club performances with his fellow representative Balmain forwards made him a certainty for the 1989 New Zealand tour where he played in all three Tests. On the 1990 Kangaroo tour Roach played in all five Tests against Great Britain and France and in five other minor tour games. In a Test match against New Zealand in Melbourne in 1991, Roach clashed famously with Kiwi forward Dean Lonergan and required 20 stitches. Early in the game the Kiwi forward had attempted a tackle on Roach but the pair accidentally clashed heads, leaving Roach requiring stitches and Lonergan convulsing on the ground, though both would return to the game.

Blocker was dropped after the Australian's shock 24–8 loss to NZ in the Melbourne test but was chosen for the end of season tour of Papua New Guinea.. However, Roach suffered a broken ankle in the first match of the tour which would prove to be his last appearance in any game for the Kangaroos

== Playing style ==
In a game in 1990 against Manly at Brookvale Oval, he received a four-week suspension for backchatting the referee Eddie Ward, whom Roach patronisingly patted on the head after he was ordered from the field. Coming into physical contact with a referee is regarded as a serious offence and Roach was considered fortunate that no further action was taken, especially considering Roach had also verbally abused the touch judge on his way off the field, calling him a “(expletive) wombat".

== Post-playing life ==
By the end of the 1992 season Roach had written an autobiography, Doing My Block and he became a commentator with the Nine Network as well as making appearances on The NRL Footy Show. After a disagreement with fellow Channel 9 commentators Paul Vautin and Peter Sterling he was sacked by the network and signed by the official rugby league radio broadcaster 2UE, before later moving to 2GB with Ray Hadley and his Continuous Call Team. He has made further television appearances on the Seven Network's Sportsworld and is one of a number of former players who appear in radio, TV and print ads for the Lowes menswear chain. After a 3-year stint as assistant coach with Manly, Roach was appointed to the coaching committee of his beloved Tigers – now the Wests Tigers.

On 23 June 2000, Roach was awarded the Australian Sports Medal for his contribution to Australia's international standing in rugby league.

In February 2008, Steve Roach was named in the list of Australia's 100 Greatest Players (1908–2007) which was commissioned by the NRL and ARL to celebrate the code's centenary year in Australia.

In 2011 Roach joined Network Ten's new Thursday night Rugby League show The Game Plan.

In 2014, Roach was sacked by 2GB after a staff member filed a bullying complaint against him.

In 2016 he made a comeback to the Rugby League commentary box signing on with Fox Sports.

In 2018, Roach revealed that his nickname 'Blocker' actually came from his time employed as a Licensed Plumber where it was remarked by his colleagues that he would 'block' pipes that would subsequently require plumbing works to be conducted.

In 2019, he appeared regularly on Fox Sports panel show, 'Controversy Corner', as well as commentating for the network.

== Sources ==
- Whiticker, Alan and Hudson, Glen; The Encyclopedia of Rugby League Players (3rd ed); published 1998, Gary Allen Pty. Ltd.
- Roach, Steve with Ray Chesterton; Doing My Block; published 1992, Ironbark Press.
- Andrews, Malcolm (2006) The ABC of Rugby League Austn Broadcasting Corpn, Sydney
