= 2024 NRL Pre-season Challenge =

- Duration: 15 – 25 February 2024
- Teams: 16
- Premiers: Brisbane Broncos (1st title)
- Matches played: 16
- Points scored: 762

The 2024 NRL Pre-season Challenge was played from 15 to 25 February 2024, before a 7-day lead up until the beginning of the 2024 NRL season.

== Background ==
The Penrith Panthers did not participate in the Pre-season Challenge as they were in the United Kingdom contesting the 2024 World Club Challenge.

== Standings ==
The winner of the Pre-season Challenge received $100,000 AUD. Twelve competition points were awarded for a win and six for a draw. One bonus competition point was awarded for each of the following: 5 or more tries, 5 or more line breaks, and 10 or more offloads.

Pos	Team	Pld	W	D	L	PF	PA	PD	BP	Pts
1	Brisbane Broncos (C)	2	2	0	0	86	34	+52	4	28
2	Sydney Roosters	2	2	0	0	82	32	+50	4	28
3	Canberra Raiders	2	1	0	1	64	52	+12	4	16
4	Newcastle Knights	2	1	0	1	54	46	+8	4	16
5	Dolphins	2	1	0	1	48	48	0	4	16
6	New Zealand Warriors	2	1	0	1	50	40	+10	3	15
7	St. George Illawarra Dragons	2	1	0	1	40	46	−6	3	15
8	Parramatta Eels	2	1	0	1	42	54	−12	3	15
9	Canterbury-Bankstown Bulldogs	2	1	0	1	30	24	+6	2	14
10	Melbourne Storm	2	1	0	1	40	34	+6	2	14
11	Wests Tigers	2	1	0	1	36	50	−14	2	14
12	North Queensland Cowboys	2	1	0	1	56	72	−16	2	14
13	South Sydney Rabbitohs	2	1	0	1	38	52	−14	1	13
14	Cronulla-Sutherland Sharks	2	1	0	1	30	50	−20	0	12
15	Gold Coast Titans	2	0	0	2	30	52	−22	0	0
16	Manly Warringah Sea Eagles	2	0	0	2	36	76	−40	0	0

Source: Official NRL Ladder for 2024 Premiership Season
(C) Champions

== Fixtures ==
=== First week ===
15 February 2024
19:00 AEDT (UTC+11:00)

Canterbury-Bankstown Bulldogs	24–12	Melbourne Storm
	Report

Belmore Sports Ground, Sydney
Referee: Wyatt Raymond

17 February 2024
13:45 AEDT (UTC+11:00)

Newcastle Knights	44–18	Cronulla Sutherland Sharks
	Report

Industree Group Stadium, Gosford
Attendance: 7,952
Referee: Kasey Badger

17 February 2024
15:45 AEDT (UTC+11:00)

Sydney Roosters	36–22	Manly-Warringah Sea Eagles
	Report

Industree Group Stadium, Gosford
Attendance: 8,663
Referee: Peter Gough

17 February 2024
17:55 AEDT (UTC+11:00)

Parramatta Eels	16–38	Canberra Raiders
	Report

Netstrata Jubilee Stadium, Sydney
Attendance: 8,827
Referee: Nick Pelgrave

17 February 2024
20:05 AEDT (UTC+11:00)

South Sydney Rabbitohs	28–6	St George Illawarra Dragons
	Report

Netstrata Jubilee Stadium, Sydney
Attendance: 8,827
Referee: Belinda Sharpe

18 February 2024
16:00 NZDT (UTC+13:00)

New Zealand Warriors	16–18	Wests Tigers
	Report

Apollo Projects Stadium, Christchurch
Attendance: 13,760
Referee: Chris Sutton

18 February 2024
15:55 AEST (UTC+10:00)

North Queensland Cowboys	20–46	Brisbane Broncos
	Report

BB Print Stadium, Mackay
Attendance: 5,332
Referee: Ziggy Przeklasa-Adamski

18 February 2024
17:15 AEST (UTC+10:00)

Dolphins	26–14	Gold Coast Titans
	Report

Sunshine Coast Stadium, Sunshine Coast
Attendance: 7,869
Referee: Chris Butler

=== Second week ===
23 February 2024
18:00 AEDT (UTC+11:00)

South Sydney Rabbitohs	10–46	Sydney Roosters
	Report

Belmore Sports Ground, Sydney
Attendance: 6,091
Referee: Ashley Klein

23 February 2024
20:00 AEDT (UTC+11:00)

Cronulla Sutherland Sharks	12–6	Canterbury-Bankstown Bulldogs
	Report

Belmore Sports Ground, Sydney
Attendance: 6,091
Referee: Adam Gee

24 February 2024
14:45 FJT (UTC+12:00)

Melbourne Storm	28–10	Newcastle Knights
	Report

Churchill Park, Lautoka
Attendance: 5,218
Referee: Belinda Sharpe

24 February 2024
17:45 NZDT (UTC+13:00)

New Zealand Warriors	34–22	Dolphins
	Report

Go Media Stadium, Auckland
Attendance: 14,276
Referee: Liam Kennedy

24 February 2024
17:55 AEDT (UTC+11:00)

Manly Warringah Sea Eagles	14–40	Brisbane Broncos
	Report

4 Pines Park, Sydney
Referee: Grant Atkins

24 February 2024
20:05 AEDT (UTC+11:00)

St George Illawarra Dragons	34–18	Wests Tigers
	Report

Glen Willow Oval, Mudgee
Attendance: 4,962
Referee: Kasey Badger

25 February 2024
15:00 AEDT (UTC+11:00)

Canberra Raiders	26–36	North Queensland Cowboys
	Report

Seiffert Oval, Queanbeyan
Attendance: 6,048
Referee: Chris Butler

25 February 2024
16:00 AEST (UTC+10:00)

Gold Coast Titans	16–26	Parramatta Eels
	Report

North Ipswich Reserve, Ipswich
Attendance: 5,306
Referee: Gerard Sutton

== See also ==
- 2024 NRL season
- 2024 NRL season results
