= Kerrod Walters =

Former Australia international rugby league footballer

Personal information
- Born: 20 October 1967 (age 59) Rockhampton, Queensland, Australia

Playing information
- Height: 175 cm (5 ft 9 in)
- Weight: 80 kg (12 st 8 lb)
- Position: Hooker
Club
Years	Team	Pld	T	G	FG	P
	Booval Swifts
1986–87	Ipswich Jets	21	10	0	0	40
1988–96	Brisbane Broncos	181	23	0	0	92
1997–98	Adelaide Rams	41	4	0	0	16
1999	Gateshead Thunder	22	2	1	0	10
2000	Brisbane Broncos	1	0	0	0	0
	Total	266	39	1	0	158
Representative
Years	Team	Pld	T	G	FG	P
1989–94	Queensland	7	2	0	0	8
1989–92	Australia	8	1	0	0	4
- Education: Bremer State High School; Ipswich Grammar School
- Relatives: Steve Walters (brother); Kevin Walters (brother); Billy Walters (nephew)

Kerrod Walters (born 20 October 1967) is an Australian former rugby league footballer. A Queensland State of Origin and Australian international representative hooker, he played most of his club football with the Brisbane Broncos, with whom he won the 1992 and 1993 NSWRL Premierships.

Kerrod Walters was endorsed by the Glenn Lazarus Team as a candidate for the Senate in Queensland at the 2016 federal election.

== Playing career ==
=== Early years ===
Born in Rockhampton and hailing from Ipswich, Kerrod Walters first showed his talent with the Ipswich Jets alongside his brothers Steve, Kevin and Brett. The combination of the Walters brothers and Allan Langer later became known as "the Ipswich connection". In 1988 he and Ipswich teammate Langer joined the newly formed Brisbane Broncos to compete in the Winfield Cup premiership. Along with Shane Duffy Walters was named the 1988 Brisbane Broncos season's rookie of the year.

=== Brisbane Broncos ===
In 1989, Walters displaced representative hooker Greg Conescu as the Broncos first choice rake and would go on to represent Queensland, being named man-of-the-match in the third game of that year's State of Origin series. After his standout performances for Queensland who won the series 3–0, Walters was selected for the mid-season Kangaroo Tour of New Zealand where he made his test début in the first test against New Zealand at Queen Elizabeth II Park in Christchurch, scoring a try on début as the Aussies won 26–6. He would retain his place in the side for the final two tests of the series as Australia swept the Kiwis 3–0.

In the 1990 State of Origin series he out-pointed New South Wales hooker Ben Elias (despite the Blues winning the series 2-1) and was selected to play in the mid-season Tests against New Zealand and France. The Broncos would go on to play in their first finals series in 1990 and Walters was considered an automatic selection for the 1990 Kangaroo tour. History was created when Kerrod and brother Kevin were selected both to tour making them the first ever twins to make a Kangaroo Tour. After disappointing in the shock first Test loss to Great Britain at London's famous Wembley Stadium, he was lost his test spot to Elias for the remainder of the tour.

The following year, Walters was sent off for punching Western Suburbs Magpies forward Graeme Wynn in a club match, and his resulting two-week suspension opened the way for brother Steve (at the time a two time premiership winner with the Canberra Raiders) to come into both the Queensland and Australian teams. This connection continued when Steve Walters was injured on the 1991 tour of Papua New Guinea and Kerrod was called up to replace him. The two tests against the Kumuls in 1991 would prove to be the final tests of his career in which he would make it onto the field.

While Kerrod did not appear in a Test match during 1992, he played his role in the Broncos maiden Grand Final win over St George and their World Club Championship win over English champions Wigan. That year he was awarded the Broncos' player of the year. The Walters brothers had already become the first trio to play for Queensland and Australia when, in 1992, they achieved another milestone when all three were selected to tour with the 1992 Rugby League World Cup final squad, though while Steve and Kevin played in 10–6 win over Great Britain at Wembley, Kerrod was not selected in the final XVII.

Kerrod Walters was selected for what would be his final test in the first test of the mid-season Trans-Tasman Test series against New Zealand in Auckland. Walters was selected on the bench (brother Steve was the starting hooker while Kevin played five-eighth), but did not take the field in the 14–all draw. This game created history for Australia as it was the first (and so far only) test in which 3 brothers were selected. While his brothers would be selected for the final two tests of the series (both won by Australia), Kerrod would never again gain Australian selection.

After the Broncos' back-to-back grand final win in 1993, Walters made his final appearance for Queensland the following year. During the 1994 NSWRL season, Walters played at hooker for defending premiers Brisbane when they hosted British champions Wigan for the 1994 World Club Challenge. Unfortunately for Walters and the Broncos, in front of a record World Club Challenge crowd of 54,220 at their home ground ANZ Stadium, Wigan gained revenge for their 1992 loss by winning 20–14.

=== Super League and England ===
In 1996, he was cut from the Broncos and signed with Super League club, the Adelaide Rams. In his second season with the Rams, he was dropped from first grade (after a falling out with coach Rod Reddy) but returned to something resembling his best form late in the season after Reddy's sacking.

When the club folded at the end of 1998 Walters joined Gateshead Thunder in the Super League but returned to Australia midway through the 1999 season after he and his wife were injured in a car accident while on holiday in Thailand.

=== Retirement ===
At the end of the 1999 season, Walters signed a one-year deal with the Broncos but played in just one match from the interchange bench during the 2000 season. That year he was awarded the Australian Sports Medal for his contribution to Australia's international standing in the sport of rugby league.

In 2004, Walters became the 5th former player inducted into the Broncos official Hall of Fame. During the 2007 season at the Broncos' 20-year anniversary celebration, Walters was included in a list of the Broncos 20 greatest players.

== Accolades ==
Dally M Hooker Of The Year: 1989, 1990

== Political career ==
Walters was part of Glenn Lazarus' team in the 2016 Senate election. Both Lazarus and Walters were unsuccessful in gaining election.

== Personal life ==
In May 2013, Walters suffered a heart attack and required treatment in hospital.
