= Martin Bella =

Australia international rugby league footballer

- Born: 26 March 1964 (age 62); Sarina, Queensland, Australia
- Relatives: Anthony Bella (brother)
- Rugby league career

Personal information
- Height: 182 cm (6 ft 0 in)
- Weight: 120 kg (18 st 13 lb)

Playing information
- Position: Prop
Club
Years	Team	Pld	T	G	FG	P
1983–85	Easts (Brisbane)
1984–86	Halifax	33	3			12
1986–89	North Sydney Bears	83	1	0	0	4
1990–92	Manly Sea Eagles	57	2	0	0	8
1993–94	Canterbury Bulldogs	46	2	0	0	8
1995	North Qld Cowboys	14	0	0	0	0
1996–97	Gold Coast Chargers	35	2	0	0	8
	Total	268	10	0	0	40
Representative
Years	Team	Pld	T	G	FG	P
1983–94	Queensland	22	0	0	0	0
1988–91	Australia	9	0	0	0	0

Member of Mackay Regional Council
- Incumbent
- Assumed office 19 March 2016

Personal details
- Party: Independent

Martin Bella (born 26 March 1964), nicknamed Munster, is an Australian former rugby league footballer who played in the 1980s and 1990s. A prop, he represented Queensland and Australia, and played his club football for a number of clubs in Australian and England.

== Background ==
Born in Sarina, Queensland, Bella is of Italian descent and played his junior rugby league for the Sarina Crocs.

== Playing career ==
Bella first came to prominence playing in the Foley Shield competition. A Queensland and Australian Schoolboy representative, his Mackay under-18 team defeated Herbert River in the final and he later represented the North Queensland Marlins. In 1983, Bella left north Queensland to play for the Easts Tigers in Brisbane Rugby League premiership. After three seasons in Brisbane and two off-seasons playing for Halifax in England's Rugby Football League, Bella moved to North Sydney Bears in 1986.

=== North Sydney Bears ===
In 1986, Bella played 23 games for the Bears in his first season at the club, starting 19 games at prop. At the end of the season, he went on the 1986 Kangaroo tour of Great Britain and France, playing in most games on the tour, but not the Tests.

In 1987, he made his State of Origin debut for Queensland and played in 23 games for the Bears. In 1988, he again represented Queensland and played his first Test match for Australia, coming off the bench in the Kangaroos' third Test loss to Great Britain on their tour of Australia.

In 1989, Bella played 17 games for the Bears and was named man of the match in Queensland's Game One win over New South Wales. Following the Origin series, in which Queensland won 3–0, Bella was selected for Australia's mid-season tour of New Zealand, though he only played in 3 minor games on tour and failed to make the Test team.

=== Manly Warringah Sea Eagles ===
In 1990, Bella joined the Manly Warringah Sea Eagles. He played in 22 games for the Sea Eagles and was named the Dally M Prop of the Year. At the end of the 1990 NSWRL season, he went on the 1990 Kangaroo tour of Great Britain and France. Unfortunately for Bella, he paid the price for Australia's first Ashes series loss to Great Britain at Wembley Stadium and was replaced in the test team by Glenn Lazarus for the remaining tests on the tour.

In 1991, Bella won his second man of the match award in the third and deciding match of the 1991 State of Origin series. After his displays for Queensland, he was recalled to the Australian team for the mid-season 1991 Trans-Tasman Test series against New Zealand. He played his final two Tests during Australia's tour of Papua New Guinea in 1991, played a total of nine Tests for his country.

=== Canterbury-Bankstown Bulldogs ===
After three years with the Sea Eagles, Bella joined the Canterbury-Bankstown Bulldogs as one of their key signings along with Jim Dymock and Jim Serdaris for the 1993 season. During the 1993 State of Origin series, Bella memorably played the ball the wrong way after being spun around in a strong tackle. In 1994, he played in Canterbury's Grand Final loss to the Canberra Raiders, where he famously knocked the ball on from the opening kick off.

In all, he played 46 out of a possible 48 games in his two seasons with the Bulldogs – the only two he missed were due to State of Origin duties.

His final season with the Bulldogs coincided with his final of 21 State of Origin games for Queensland.

=== North Queensland Cowboys ===
In 1995, Bella decided against retirement and returned to north Queensland, signing with the newly established North Queensland Cowboys. A veteran, representative forward at that stage of his career, Bella was perhaps the club's biggest signing for their first season. On 11 March 1995, Bella started at prop in the Cowboys' inaugural game, a 16–32 loss to the Sydney Bulldogs at Stockland Stadium. Bella played just 14 games for the Cowboys, being released from the club at the back end of the 1995 season due to behavioural issues.

=== Gold Coast Chargers ===
Bella considered retirement after his release by the Cowboys but again decided against it, signing with the Gold Coast Chargers in 1996. In two seasons with the club, he played 35 games, including the club's first (and only) finals games in 1997. After 12 seasons and 235 first grade games, he retired from rugby league at the end of the 1997 season.

== Achievements and accolades ==
=== Individual ===
- Dally M Prop of the Year: 1990

== Post-football life ==
Bella holds a degree in physiotherapy and has run his own practice in the Queensland rural town of Sarina. Since 2016, he has served as a councillor on the Mackay Regional Council.

== Statistics ==
=== NSWRL/ARL ===
Season	Team	Matches	T	G	GK %	F/G	Pts
1986	North Sydney	23	1	0	—	0	4
1987	North Sydney	23	0	0	—	0	0
1988	North Sydney	20	0	0	—	0	0
1989	North Sydney	17	0	0	—	0	0
1990	Manly Warringah	22	0	0	—	0	0
1991	Manly Warringah	19	1	0	—	0	4
1992	Manly Warringah	16	1	0	—	0	4
1993	Canterbury-Bankstown	22	2	0	—	0	8
1994	Canterbury-Bankstown	24	0	0	—	0	0
1995	North Queensland	14	0	0	—	0	0
1996	Gold Coast	17	1	0	—	0	4
1997	Gold Coast	18	1	0	—	0	4
Career totals		235	7	0	—	0	28

=== State of Origin ===
†	Denotes seasons in which Bella won a State of Origin Series

Season	Team	Matches	T	G	GK %	F/G	Pts
1987†	Queensland	2	0	0	—	0	0
1988†	Queensland	3	0	0	—	0	0
1989†	Queensland	3	0	0	—	0	0
1990	Queensland	3	0	0	—	0	0
1991†	Queensland	3	0	0	—	0	0
1992	Queensland	3	0	0	—	0	0
1993	Queensland	3	0	0	—	0	0
1994	Queensland	1	0	0	—	0	0
Career totals		21	0	0	—	0	0

=== Australia ===
†	Denotes seasons in which Bella won a World Cup

Season	Team	Matches	T	G	GK %	F/G	Pts
1988†	Australia	1	0	0	—	0	0
1990	Australia	3	0	0	—	0	0
1991†	Australia	5	0	0	—	0	0
Career totals		9	0	0	—	0	0

== Post-playing career ==
In 2000, Bella was awarded the Australian Sports Medal for his contribution to Australia's international standing in rugby league. In 2008, Bella was named in the North Queensland rugby league Team of the Century.

== Personal life ==
A qualified physiotherapist, Bella's brothers Robert and Anthony, played first grade for the South Queensland Crushers. Bella's son, Ross, currently plays for the Mackay Cutters in the Queensland Cup and previously played for the Townsville Blackhawks and North Queensland Cowboys under-20 team. His niece, Lauren, plays in the AFLW for the Gold Coast Suns.
