= Alan McIndoe =

Australia international rugby league footballer

Personal information
- Born: 14 May 1964 (age 62) Emerald, Queensland, Australia

Playing information
- Position: Wing
Club
Years	Team	Pld	T	G	FG	P
1983–88	Illawarra Steelers	73	38	0	0	152
1989–90	Penrith Panthers	37	26	0	0	104
1991–93	Illawarra Steelers	53	27	0	0	108
	Total	163	91	0	0	364
Representative
Years	Team	Pld	T	G	FG	P
1988–90	Queensland	9	3	0	0	12
1988	Australia	1	0	0	0	0

Alan McIndoe (born 14 May 1964) is an Australian former rugby league footballer who played in the 1980s and 1990s. A Queensland State of Origin and Australian international representative wing, he played club football in the New South Wales Rugby League premiership for the Illawarra Steelers, with whom he topped the League's try-scoring list in 1991, and the Penrith Panthers. On 4 October 2006 McIndoe was named on the wing in a 40 Year Panthers Legends Team. The same year he was named on the wing in the Illawarra Steelers' "Team of Steel".

== Playing career ==
Coming from Emerald, Queensland, McIndoe started playing first grade football for Illawarra in 1983. He made his debut for Queensland in the 1988 State of Origin series, scoring a try in game 1 and playing in all three matches.

That year he also represented Australia against a 'Rest of the World' team. The following season McIndoe moved to Penrith and also played in all three matches of the 1989 State of Origin series, scoring in games 1 and 2.

In the 1990 season he was, for the third consecutive year, selected for Queensland in all three games of the State of Origin before playing for the Panthers in their Grand Final loss to Canberra. He returned to Illawarra in the 1991 NSWRL season and that year took the club record for most tries in a match with 5 against the Gold Coast and went on to be the League's top try-scorer with 19. McIndoe played his final season with the Steelers in 1993.

In 2020, McIndoe spoke to NRL.com about his final year at Illawarra saying "I love Illawarra – it will always be my second home but we had a disagreement in my final season in 1993. I got into financial planning and one of my teammates was Dale Fritz. We sat down and he told me how much money he was on ... he was a good player and I told him he could do better and to put feelers out. Another coach found out – and told the Steelers and the shit hit the fan. They wanted to sack me straight away. In the end, they stripped me of the club captaincy, which hurt. But we resolved it and I left on good terms. I had two years as captain-coach of Tumut and then gave it away".

== Sources ==
- Alan McIndoe at stateoforigin.com.au
- Alan McIndoe at nrlstats.com
- Queensland representatives at qrl.com.au
