= Bob Hagan (rugby league) =

Australian rugby league footballer and coach (1940–2025)

Personal information
- Born: 8 January 1940 Brisbane, Queensland, Australia
- Died: 25 February 2025 (aged 85)

Playing information
- Position: Wing, Centre
Club
Years	Team	Pld	T	G	FG	P
1965–66	Huddersfield
1967–70	Canterbury-Bankstown	45	6	6	0	30
	Total	45	6	6	0	30
Representative
Years	Team	Pld	T	G	FG	P
1961–63	Queensland	11	3	8	0	25
1962–63	Australia	2	0	2	0	4
1967	New South Wales	1	0	0	0	0
1967	NSW City	1	0	0	0	0

Coaching information
Club
Years	Team	Gms	W	D	L	W%
1971–72	Canterbury-Bankstown	44	23	0	21	52
- Source: As of 25 October 2019
- Relatives: Michael Hagan (brother)

Bob Hagan (8 January 1940 – 25 February 2025) was an Australian rugby league footballer, and coach. He played for Easts (Brisbane) in Queensland and for Canterbury-Bankstown in New South Wales, representing both states as well as playing for the Australian national side, he also played for Huddersfield in England. He was the older brother of rugby league player and coach, Michael Hagan.

== Playing career ==
Hagan represented the Commonwealth XIII rugby league team while at Huddersfield in 1965 against New Zealand at Crystal Palace National Recreation Centre, London on Wednesday 18 August 1965.

He played for Canterbury-Bankstown in their 1967 NSWRL grand final defeat against South Sydney at the Sydney Cricket Ground.

== Post playing ==
Hagan coached Canterbury-Bankstown in 1970–71 and was later a board member under club stalwart Peter Moore. Hagan took over as CEO of Canterbury when Moore retired in 1996 and was in that position when the salary cap scandal of 2002 broke. He resigned from the club immediately and retired to Queensland. His replacement was Steve Mortimer.

Hagan died on 25 February 2025, at the age of 85.
