= Michael Hagan =

Australian rugby league footballer and coach (born 1964)

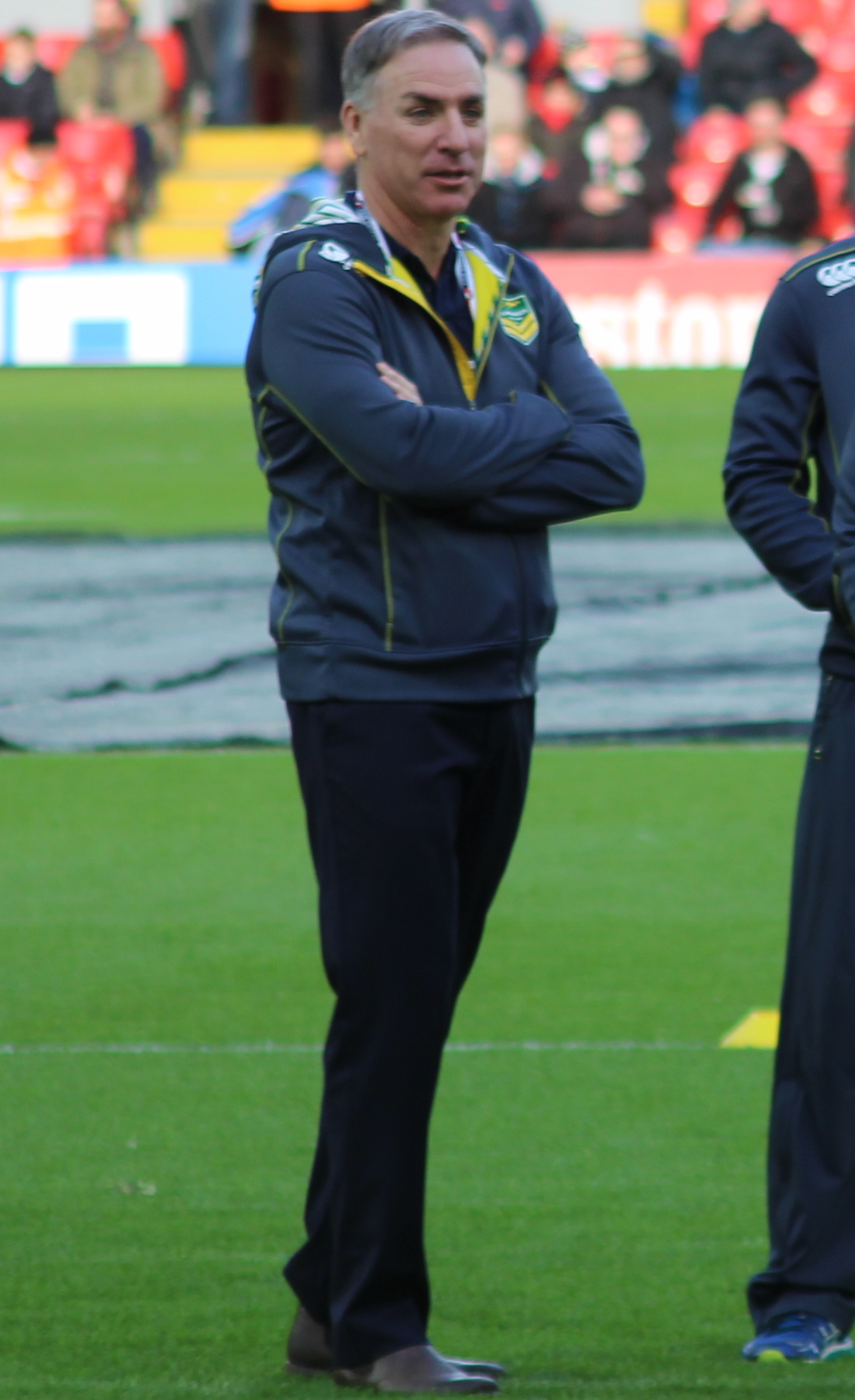

Personal information
- Born: 12 August 1964 (age 62) Brisbane, Queensland, Australia

Playing information
- Height: 180 cm (5 ft 11 in)
- Weight: 81 kg (12 st 11 lb)
- Position: Five-eighth, Centre, Halfback
Club
Years	Team	Pld	T	G	FG	P
1984–88	Canterbury Bulldogs	72	9	0	0	36
1984–85	Halifax	25	14	0	0	56
1989–93	Newcastle Knights	111	16	0	3	67
1993–95	Halifax	67	16	0	1	19
	Total	275	55	0	4	178
Representative
Years	Team	Pld	T	G	FG	P
1988–89	Queensland	5	0	0	0	0

Coaching information
Club
Years	Team	Gms	W	D	L	W%
2001–06	Newcastle Knights	154	83	1	70	54
2007–08	Parramatta Eels	51	26	0	25	51
	Total	205	109	1	95	53
Representative
Years	Team	Gms	W	D	L	W%
2004–05	Queensland	6	2	0	4	33
- Relatives: Bob Hagan (brother)

Michael Hagan (born 12 August 1964) is an Australian professional rugby league football coach and former player. He currently works as an assistant coach under Mal Meninga for the Australian rugby league team. A Queensland State of Origin representative half, he played his club football in Australia with Canterbury-Bankstown (with whom he won the 1988 and 1985 premierships) and Newcastle (whom he captained), as well as in England with Halifax. He went on to have a successful coaching career with Newcastle (winning the premiership with them in 2001) and Parramatta, and was also selected to coach the Queensland Maroons for two State of Origin series before becoming Meninga's assistant coach. Hagan was inducted into the Newcastle Knights Hall of Fame in April 2012.

== Playing career ==
The younger brother of former Test centre Bob Hagan, Hagan was graded with Canterbury in 1983. Although best suited to play at five-eighth or halfback, the presence of Terry Lamb and Steve Mortimer forced Hagan to play much of his career with Canterbury as a "fill in" at fullback or lock forward. Hagan played a role filling in for Lamb in Canterbury's upset win in the 1985 grand final.

In 1988 Hagan was injured in a car crash but recovered to play in Canterbury's three finals, scoring a try in the grand final. With Mortimer retiring, Hagan might have had a chance for a permanent position in the halves, but by this time he had already decided to move to Newcastle where he signed with the Knights.

Hagan's craft and guile at five-eighth led to a rapid rise in the Knights' fortunes: they advanced from fourteenth to sixth (losing a play-off for the club’s first finals berth) in two seasons between 1988 and 1990. He took over Newcastle's captaincy in early 1990, eventually leading the club to its first finals appearance in 1992. Despite fluctuating team fortunes after this, and being moved to a less-preferred centre position to accommodate the emerging Matthew Johns for his final season of 1993, Hagan finished his career without having missed a match in any of his five seasons with the Knights.

Hagan also played 92 games for Halifax in 1984-1985 and 1993–1995. During his career with Newcastle, Hagan played five State of Origin games for Queensland, deputising for Allan Langer at halfback in 1989.

== Coaching career ==
Hagan was the media manager for the Hunter Mariners during the Super League war in Australia, and subsequently joined the coaching staff with Mal Meninga at the Canberra Raiders, coaching the President's Cup team in 1998 and First Division in 1999.

In 2000, Hagan became the first division coach at the Newcastle Knights, and succeeded Warren Ryan as coach in 2001. He became the first former Knights player to coach the club, and later that season led them to victory in the 2001 NRL grand final, becoming the first coach since Phil Gould to win the premiership in his first season.

Hagan coached the Queensland State of Origin team in 2004 and 2005. Although he was unable to win a series, in both years the series went to a deciding game, only for the Maroons to lose. During both years, Hagan coached the likes of Slater, Lockyer, Thurston, Thaiday, Smith and Bowen (whilst having to coach against Buderus, Simpson and Johns at the same time), most of whom went on to play for Australia, and most of whom featured prominently in Queensland's eight-year Origin reign between 2006 and 2013. Hagan resigned as Queensland coach in 2005 to concentrate on coaching the Knights given their poor season in which they finished at the foot of the ladder for the first time in the club's history. His successor, Mal Meninga, went on to win nine out of the following ten State of Origin series for Queensland. In 2010 Hagan returned to the Queensland side as an assistant coach.

In 2005, after losing their first thirteen games of the season, the Knights finished with the wooden spoon. In early 2006, Hagan signed a contract to coach the Parramatta Eels from 2007 to 2009, finishing his tenure at Newcastle at the end of the 2006 season. He left the Knights as the longest serving coach in club history, and guided them to finals appearances in four of his six seasons, more than any other coach in the team's history.

In 2007, the Eels showed much improvement under Hagan, spending much of the season at 3rd position on the ladder (only behind the Melbourne Storm and bitter rivals the Manly-Warringah Sea Eagles) before a surprise defeat against his old club the Newcastle Knights (who were at the time coached by Brian Smith) triggered a late-season form slump. The Eels toned up for the finals by handing what was to be the Brisbane Broncos' worst-ever defeat at the time with a 68-22 mauling (this despite the Eels trailing 22–6 at one stage) in the final round at Parramatta Stadium. The Eels advanced to the finals finishing in 5th position which meant a tough away trip in the first round to face the 4th-placed New Zealand Warriors in New Zealand. The Eels managed to upset the Warriors 12-10 despite a late charge from the hosts. This earned the Eels a home semi final match against long-time rivals the Bulldogs. The Eels also won this match comfortably, earning them a preliminary final showdown with the Melbourne Storm at Melbourne's Telstra Dome. The Eels were gallant in defeat, losing 24–10, whilst Melbourne ultimately went on to win the 2007 NRL Grand Final.

Following a relatively disappointing 2008 NRL season, Hagan ended his head coaching role at the Parramatta Eels citing family reasons and health.

In 2010, he returned to coaching, being appointed the Maroons assistant coach.

== The Daily Telegraph ==
Hagan has made journalistic contributions to 'League Central' section of The Daily Telegraph. He provides his opinions on current League issues as well as evaluating team form and performances.
