= Paul Sironen =

Australia international rugby league footballer

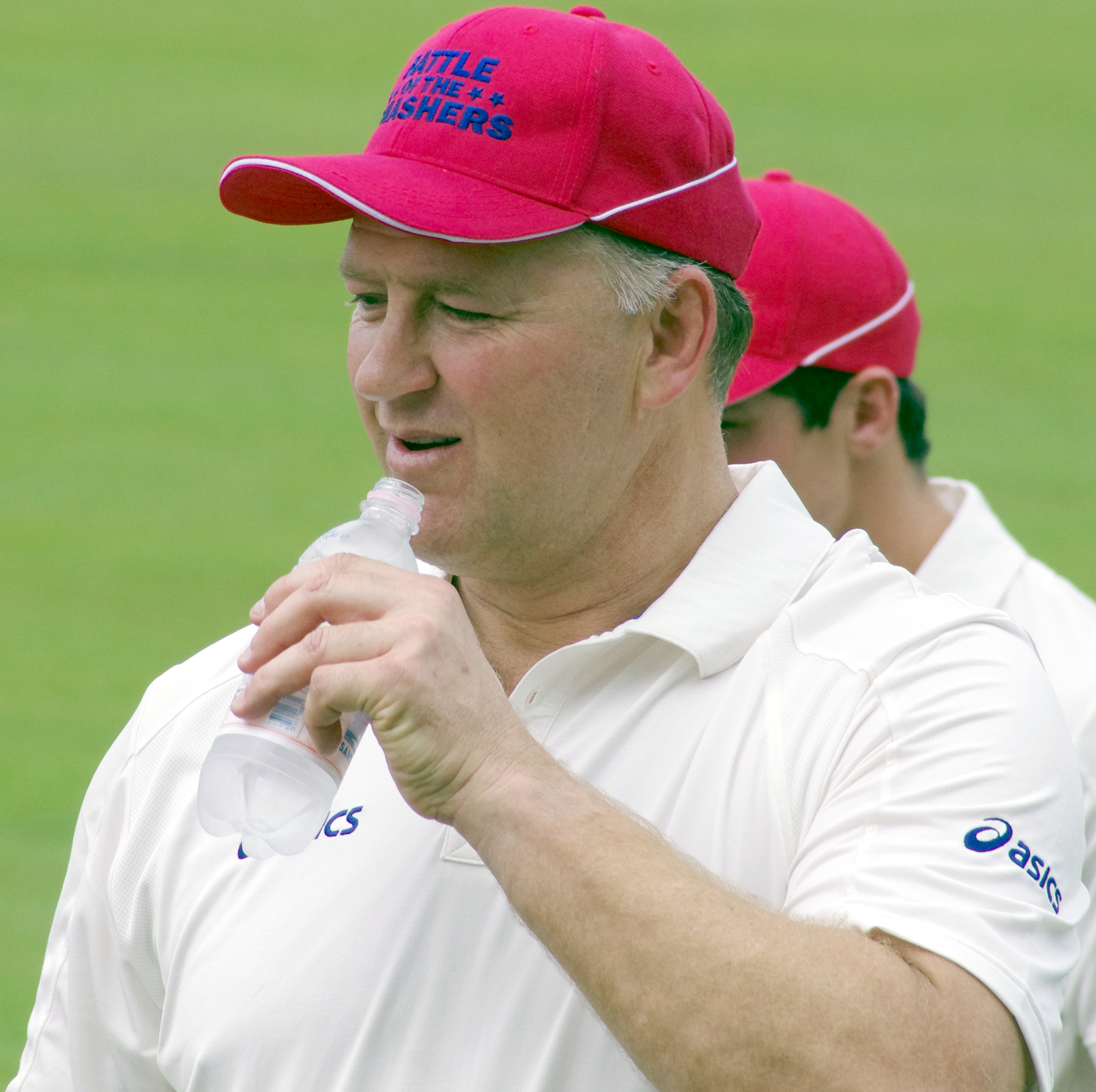

Personal information
- Full name: Paul Sironen
- Born: 23 May 1965 (age 61) North Sydney, New South Wales, Australia

Playing information
- Height: 195 cm (6 ft 5 in)
- Weight: 115 kg (18 st 2 lb)
- Position: Second-row, Prop
Club
Years	Team	Pld	T	G	FG	P
1985–98	Balmain Tigers	246	22	0	0	88
1999	Villeneuve-sur-Lot
	Total	246	22	0	0	88
Representative
Years	Team	Pld	T	G	FG	P
1989–94	New South Wales	14	0	0	0	0
1986–94	Australia	21	3	0	0	12
- Relatives: Curtis Sironen (son); Bayley Sironen (son)

Paul Sironen (born 23 May 1965) is an Australian former professional rugby league footballer of Finnish descent who was a prominent Second-row forward for the Balmain Tigers during the late 1980s, and early 1990s. He was part of the team that played in successive Grand Finals in 1988 and 1989, and included other representative players Steve "Blocker" Roach, Wayne Pearce, Benny Elias and Garry Jack. He made a number of appearances for both New South Wales in State of Origin, and also for Australia, and has been named as part of the Wests Tigers Team of the Century.

Sironen is the father of St Helens second rower Curtis Sironen who made his NRL debut for the Tigers against the North Queensland Cowboys in Round 12 of the 2012 NRL season and Bayley Sironen.

== Playing career ==
Sironen was born in North Sydney, New South Wales. In the early 1980s, the University of Hawaii offered him a scholarship to move to Waikiki in Hawaii and play American football in the position of defensive tackle. On a (northern) summer break, Sironen played some games in the lower grades for Balmain, but also made his first-grade debut, playing two games in the top grade late in the season. Sironen decided that he "never got to touch the ball enough" and, after the first season ended in Hawaii, he moved back to Australia. He joined the Balmain Tigers and, in his first full year, he was named as the Dally M Rookie of the Year. In the 1988 NSWRL season, Sironen played in the Grand Final in which Balmain were defeated by twenty four points to twelve by the Canterbury-Bankstown Bulldogs. The following year the club again made the Grand Final. Sironen scored a try just before half time to give the Tigers a 12–2 lead, but his club again lost the Grand Final, this time by nineteen points to fourteen against the Canberra Raiders. In the 1990 season, he was named as the Dally M Second-rower of the Year. At the end of the 1990 NSWRL season, he went on the 1990 Kangaroo tour of Great Britain and France.

During the 1994 NSWRL season, Sironen was offered a two-year deal by the Cronulla-Sutherland Sharks worth $500,000 a season but he opted to stay with Balmain. At the end of the 1994 NSWRL season, he went on the 1994 Kangaroo tour. At the start of the 1995 season he was named as the captain of the club but he resigned as club captain after six rounds of the competition, in order to focus more specifically on his own game. Sironen surpassed Garry Jack's club record for the most first grade games. At the end of the 1998 season, Sironen left the club to finish out his career for French club US Villeneuve. In total he played 246 matches for the Tigers scoring twenty-two tries for a total of 88 points. He was named as a starting second rower in the Wests Tigers Team of the Century as well as the Balmain Team of the Century. In France, where he was affectionately known as "The Beast", Sironen helped his club Villeneuve-sur-Lot to victory in the final of the 1999 French championship season.

== Representative career ==
=== New South Wales ===
Sironen made his State of Origin debut for NSW in Game 1 of the 1989 series. In total he made fourteen appearances for New South Wales from 1989 to 1994, although he failed to score a single point in his State of Origin career.

=== Australia ===
In his first season in professional rugby league, Sironen was called up to the Australian squad to play against Papua New Guinea and a test match against France, as well as being selected for the 1986 Kangaroo Tour. In 1988 he was selected to play in Australia's World Cup campaign, including the final on 9 October 1988 at Eden Park in which Australia defeated New Zealand by 25–12.

In 1989, Sironen played in two Test matches on the tour of New Zealand, and in 1990 made a further two Test appearances, against France and New Zealand. He again was selected for the Kangaroo Tour in 1990, where he was a stand out performer in the 2-1 Ashes series win against Great Britain and the two-game sweep of France. Although he was injured for the majority of the 1991 season, he did manage to play for Australia during the 1992 Great Britain Lions tour of Australia and New Zealand, helping the Kangaroos retain The Ashes, winning man-of-the-match award in the third and deciding Test at Lang Park in Brisbane.

Sironen was selected for the 1992 Rugby League World Cup final, played at the famous Wembley Stadium in London in which Australia defeated Great Britain 10–6. In the 1993–94 season, Sironen had to overcome back problems to be included in the Australian squad for their three test series against New Zealand. He became just the fourth forward in the history of the game to make a third Kangaroo Tour in 1994. He was involved in controversy, after being hit by an elbow in a club game against Wigan at Central Park by British forward Barrie McDermott, and later in the tour was sent off in the match against St. Helens.

Altogether Sironen made 21 appearances for his country, scoring three tries. His last test appearance was on the 1994 Kangaroo tour where he came off the bench against Great Britain at Old Trafford in Manchester. Coach Bob Fulton had originally dropped Sirro from the side that lost 8–4 at Wembley, but he got a recall due to an injury to David Fairleigh.

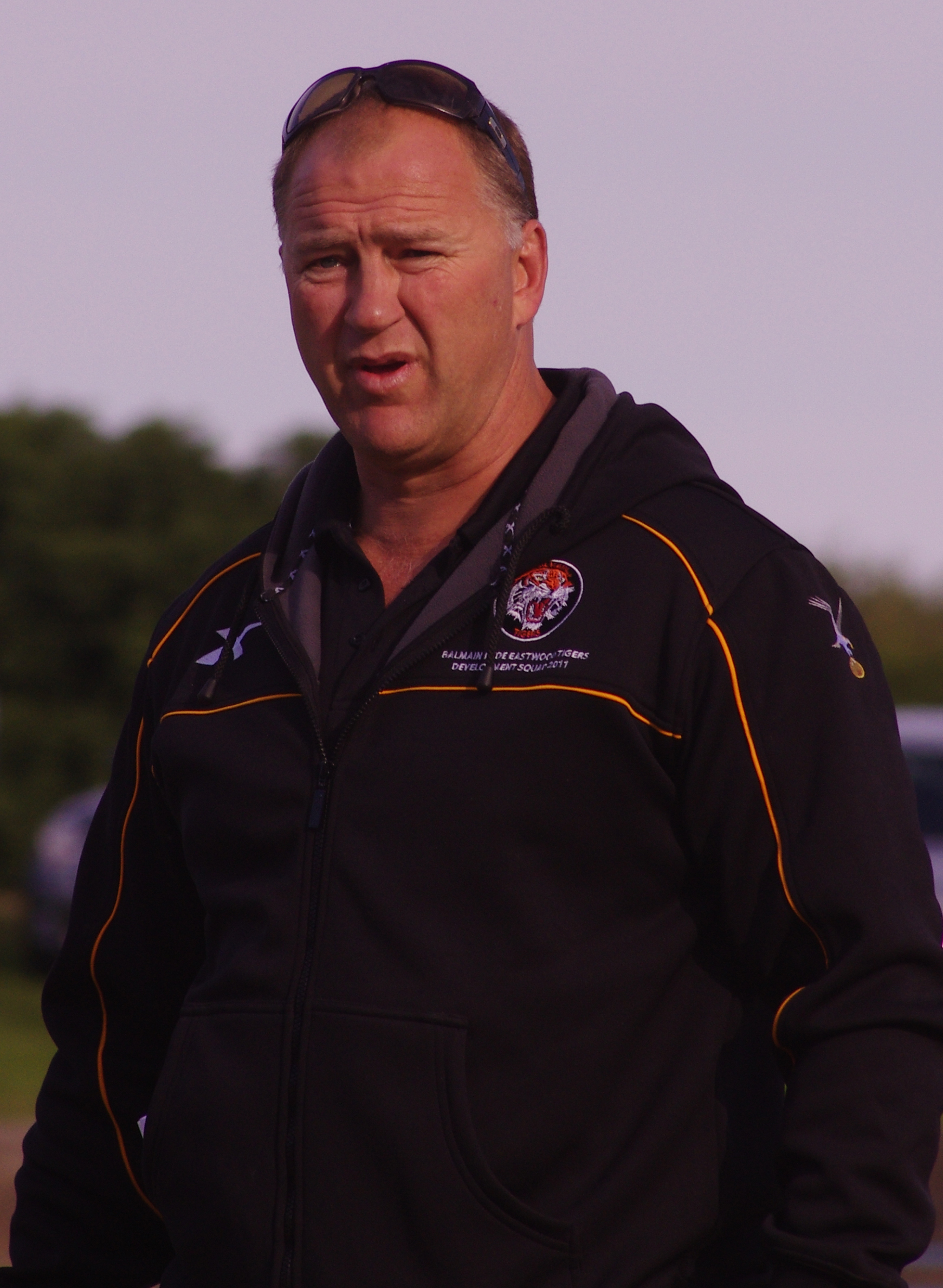
Sironen in 2012

== Life outside rugby league ==
Affectionately known as "Siro" during his playing days, he was also a former police officer and American footballer prior to his career with the Balmain Tigers. Most recently, he has branched out into business as part of the Krispy Kreme management team in Australia.

Sironen is the only original model left on Lowes Menswear television commercials which also feature Darryl Brohman and Matt Ballin, who replaced the other original models Steve "Blocker" Roach, Paul Vautin and Ray Hadley.

While playing football, Sironen also served in the New South Wales Police Force and in 2008, rugby league's centenary year in Australia, he was named at second-row in a NSW Police team of the century.

== Sources ==
- Whiticker, Alan; Hudson, Glen (2007). The Encyclopedia of Rugby League Players. Wetherill Park, New South Wales: Gary Allen Pty Ltd. p. 609. ISBN 978-1-87708-293-1.
- Sironen, Paul with Lane, Daniel (1997). Sirro! Tales from Tiger Town. GPO Box 9994, Sydney, New South Wales, 2001: ABC Books. ISBN 0-73330-577-6.
