= Bruce McGuire =

Australia international rugby league footballer

Personal information
- Full name: Bruce McGuire
- Born: 31 January 1962 (age 64) Nowra, New South Wales, Australia

Playing information
- Position: Second-row, Prop
Club
Years	Team	Pld	T	G	FG	P
1986–90	Balmain Tigers	83	6	0	0	24
1989–90	Sheffield Eagles		2	0	0	8
1991–92	Canterbury-Bankstown	39	7	0	0	28
1992–94	Sheffield Eagles		4	0	0	16
1994–96	Warrington Wolves		4	0	0	16
	Total	122	23	0	0	92
Representative
Years	Team	Pld	T	G	FG	P
1989–91	Country Origin	3	0	0	0	0
1989–90	New South Wales	5	1	0	0	4
1989	Australia	2	0	0	0	0

Bruce McGuire (born 31 January 1962) is an Australian former rugby league footballer who played in the 1980s and 1990s.

== Playing career ==
A New South Wales State of Origin and Australian international representative forward, he played in the New South Wales Rugby League premiership for the Balmain Tigers for five seasons between 1986 and 1990 and the Canterbury-Bankstown Bulldogs for two seasons between 1991 and 1992. Bruce Maguire played in two losing Grand Finals with the Balmain Tigers in 1988 and 1989. His representative career includes N.S.W. City in 1988 and New South Wales State of Origin in 1989 and 1990. He then represented Australia in two tests against New Zealand in 1989. He is listed on the Australian Players Register as Kangaroo No. 595. He finished his rugby league career in England, initially at the Sheffield Eagles and finally at the Warrington Wolves between 1994 and 1996. Bruce McGuire played at prop in Warrington's 10–40 defeat by Wigan in the 1994–95 Regal Trophy Final during the 1994–95 season at Alfred McAlpine Stadium, Huddersfield on Saturday 28 January 1995.

Originally from Nowra, he is a member of the Shoalhaven Sporting Hall of Fame.

== County Cup Final ==
Bruce McGuire played at second row and scored two tries in Sheffield Eagles' 16–29 defeat by Wakefield Trinity in the 1992 Yorkshire Cup Final during the 1992–93 season at Elland Road, Leeds on Sunday 18 October 1992.
