= Dan Stains =

Australia international rugby league footballer and coach

Personal information
- Full name: Daniel Stains
- Born: 28 June 1964 (age 62) Toowoomba, Queensland, Australia

Playing information
- Position: Second-row, Prop, Hooker
Club
Years	Team	Pld	T	G	FG	P
1987–94	Cronulla Sharks	135	6	4	0	32
1989–90	Halifax	20	2	0	0	8
1995–96	Balmain Tigers	35	0	0	0	0
1997–99	London Broncos
	Total	190	8	4	0	40
Representative
Years	Team	Pld	T	G	FG	P
1989	Australia	0	0	0	0	0
1989–90	Queensland	4	0	0	0	0

Coaching information
Club
Years	Team	Gms	W	D	L	W%
1999	London Broncos

Dan Stains (born 28 June 1964) is an Australian former rugby league footballer and coach. He played primarily for the Cronulla-Sutherland Sharks, usually as a second-row, prop and as a hooker.

== Background ==
Stains was born in Toowoomba, Queensland, Australia. He attended Centenary Heights State High School in Toowoomba.

== Playing career ==
Stains played for Halifax and captained Cronulla-Sutherland Sharks where he won the 1988 minor premiership with them. Stains had also represented Australia and Queensland State of Origin.

== Coaching career ==
Stains had previously been coach at Super League clubs Bradford Bulls and London Broncos, and is currently coaching the U14 Nambour Crushers.
