= Benny Elias =

Australia international rugby league footballer

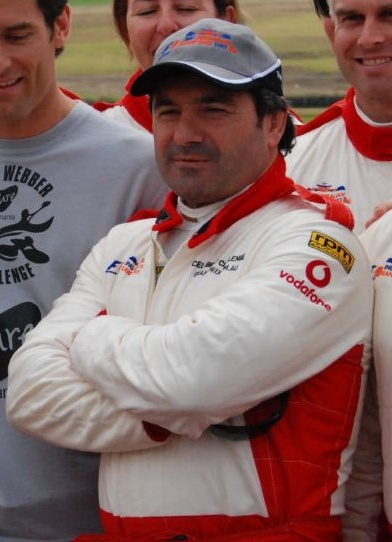

Personal information
- Full name: Benjamin Elias
- Born: 15 November 1963 (age 63) Tripoli, Lebanon

Playing information
- Height: 175 cm (5 ft 9 in)
- Weight: 83 kg (13 st 1 lb)
- Position: Hooker
Club
Years	Team	Pld	T	G	FG	P
1982–94	Balmain	234	36	4	33	181
Representative
Years	Team	Pld	T	G	FG	P
1985–94	New South Wales	19	1	0	2	6
1985–90	Australia	6	1	0	1	5
1985–94	NSW City	7	2	0	0	8
- Relatives: Mitchell Moses (nephew)

Ben Elias (Arabic: بن الياس; born 15 November 1963 in Tripoli, Lebanon) is an Australian former rugby league footballer who played in the 1980s and 1990s. He played primarily as a hooker for Balmain in the New South Wales Rugby League premiership. He was one of the leading hookers from the mid-1980s until his retirement at the end of the 1994 season. Along with Wayne Pearce, Paul Sironen and Steve Roach, Elias and his Balmain teammates formed one of the best forward packs in the modern era during the late 1980s.

Since his retirement as a player, Elias has pursued media and business interests. He is the uncle of former Wests Tigers and now Parramatta Eels half back Mitchell Moses.

== Early life ==
Elias was born in 1963 in Lebanon to Barbara Elias. The family moved to Australia at a young age.

== Playing career ==
=== Early career ===
Elias was a fan of rugby league from very young days and played his first rugby for Holy Cross College Ryde in the late 1970s as a halfback, representing Australia in the Schoolboys team from 1979 to 1981. He was graded by Balmain in 1981, and transferred quickly to the hooking position where he remained for the rest of his career. When he first played first grade in 1982 his potential as a teenager was immediately noticed, and he developed so well that by 1984 he was widely tipped for major representative honours.

While attending Holy Cross College, Ryde, Elias played for the Australian Schoolboys team in 1979 and 1981.

=== Representative Debuts ===
These came Elias' way in 1985 when he played in New South Wales' first team to win a State of Origin series, and was selected for the New Zealand tour that year. Elias was subsequently selected for the following year's Kangaroo Tour, which was undefeated through England and France, however Elias was unable to displace Royce Simmons as the Test hooker.

Elias was instrumental in Balmain's advancement to the NSWRL Grand Final against the Canterbury Bulldogs in 1988, despite experiencing a painful rib cartilage injury during the lead-up to the finals series. Though they lost 12–24 to Canterbury, Elias won the Rugby League Week Player of the Year award (one of only two hookers to achieve this feat). He was selected for the 1988 World Cup, and only a broken thumb kept him out of representative honours in 1989. He was back at his best in Balmain's surge to the Grand Final that year, narrowly missing a vital field-goal attempt in the second half of the overtime defeat by the Canberra Raiders, a game in which Steve Walters began to assert his dominance as one of leading hookers in the game at that time.

=== State of Origin career ===
Elias made 19 appearances for the New South Wales State of Origin team between 1985 and 1994 and was named man-of-the-match on 3 occasions ( Game I 1990, Game I 1992 and Game III 1994). Elias played State of Origin with incredible passion and is remembered for his fiery clashes with Queensland hookers Kerrod and Steve Walters. He was honoured later in his career when he captained the Blues in six games in 1990–1991. An enduring image of State of Origin remains from 1992 when with blood streaming down his face he helped NSW to a 14–6 win in Sydney. The nickname given to him by Roy and HG for Roy and HG's State of Origin commentary was "Backdoor Benny" and "The Crimea Look".

In 2005 he was named one of the 25 greatest ever NSW players.

=== 1990s ===
Elias produced some of his best form during 1990, including:

- Captaining NSW City in their 28–26 victory over NSW Country in the annual the City v Country match at the Sydney Football Stadium (SFS), scoring one of City's 5 tries on the day.
- Captaining NSW to their first Origin series victory over Queensland since 1986. The Blues win in Game 1 at the SFS was their first victory over Queensland since the exhibition game in Los Angeles in 1987.
- Four test appearances on the 1990 Kangaroo tour (two against Great Britain and two against France). Elias was the man of the match in the second Ashes series Test match victory over Great Britain at Old Trafford in his first test match since the 1988 World Cup Final, and scored a try in the third test win at Elland Road. Elias was the Kangaroos vice-captain on the tour.

However, 1991 was largely plagued by injury as Alan Jones replaced Warren Ryan as Balmain coach, and though Elias was fit again in 1992, he could not displace Steve Walters from his Test spot and had many competitors for the New South Wales jersey.

1993 was controversial, hit hard by suspension which prevented his re-establishing his representative career, but in 1994 Elias showed some wonderful form in the State of Origin series (man of the match in the last game) and even at times for the struggling Balmain coached by former teammate Wayne Pearce. Elias missed out on selection on the 1994 Kangaroo Tour, and at age 31, he announced his retirement as a player in December.

== Controversy ==
Despite being diminutive in size compared to many of his opponents, Elias was a tough and aggressive player, and appeared to welcome physical confrontations. Elias and then South Sydney hooker Mario Fenech had a very competitive rivalry until Fenech left South Sydney in 1991. Elias admitted on The NRL Footy Show on 19 July 2007, that during the 1986 Semi-final between Balmain and Souths at the SCG, he was successful in getting Fenech sent off when he bit his own hand and then claimed the bite was done by Fenech. Without Fenech, Souths were knocked out of the finals race with Balmain winning 36–11.

Elias released his autobiography, Balmain Benny (ISBN 1875471332), towards the end of his career, touching on many of the controversial on and off-field incidents in his career.

In 2000 Elias was awarded the Australian Sports Medal for his contribution to Australia's international standing in rugby league.

== Post retirement career ==
Following his retirement, Elias graduated from the University of Western Sydney and became a successful businessman as one of Australia's retail mobile phone sales pioneers and began rugby league radio commentary in Sydney. Elias also became the rugby league pundit for now defunct SBS Television 7pm weeknight sports program in the mid-2000s.

During his playing days, Elias was regularly interviewed. Rugby league journalist Roy Masters referred to Elias as the cliché king for his love, and occasionally incorrect use of, clichés and metaphors.

Elias is currently a member of the Wests Tigers Board along with former teammate Paul Sironen. He is also a member of the advisory board of the Perth Glory FC.

He has two children and lives in Sydney, Australia.

Elias has been involved in the controversial development of the Balmain Leagues Club site, owning a 50 per cent stake in the company behind the development while urging club members to support the proposal.

=== Hall of Fame ===
In August 2024, the National Rugby League announced that Elias was an inductee into the National Rugby League Hall of Fame. Elias, who was ascribed Hall of Fame number 118, was amongst eleven male players in the 2024 Class.
