= Club Buggery =

1995–1997 Australian TV series

- Genre: Comedy
- Written by: John Doyle; Greig Pickhaver
- Directed by: Colin Bromley
- Starring: Greig Pickhaver; John Doyle; Ian Turpie
- Country of origin: Australia
- Original language: English
- No. of seasons: 2
- No. of episodes: 28

Original release
- Network: ABC
- Release: 21 April 1995 – 27 September 1997

Club Buggery is an Australian television series made in the 1990. It was created and performed by Australian comedy duo Roy and HG (John Doyle and Greig Pickhaver) and broadcast on the Australian Broadcasting Corporation (ABC) network in 1996 and 1997.

== Development ==
The series was an offshoot of the duo's long-running, groundbreaking improvised radio comedy series This Sporting Life (TSL), which premiered on the Triple J radio network in 1986 and ran until 2008. Doyle and Pickhaver first essayed a television adaptation of TSL in 1993, but that series was only partially successful and suffered from the limitations imposed by its predominantly 'talking head' style.

Its successor Club Buggery, broke these limitations by creating an innovative blend of format elements including variety, talk and sketch comedy. It referenced many Australian club and television entertainment genres including the RSL club circuit, and vintage television programs in the sport, variety, quiz, talk and music genres. The intertextual and subversive nature of the humour was evidenced by the title.

The program ran for two series of 28 episodes each under the title Club Buggery and it then was retitled as The Channel Nine Show (retaining the same basic format) for a further series of ten episodes in 1998. The title was a reference to both a vintage television series (it was the Sydney title of the famous Melbourne-based variety series In Melbourne Tonight, presented by Graham Kennedy), as well as referring ironically to contemporary rumours that the duo were leaving the ABC to go to the Kerry Packer-owned Nine Network.

Later in 1998 they presented the similarly-formatted Planet Norwich, which was recorded in the UK and presumably intended for the British market. Some time later they also presented segments as part of a comedy series hosted by British comedian Ben Elton.

== Title ==
In most English speaking countries, the word "buggery" has two quite specific and extremely negative meanings – one refers to the act of anal intercourse, and the other to the charge in law that proscribes that act. But in Australian English, the word "buggery" and its derivations have taken on a remarkably broad range of uses, many of which are generally understood as being slightly (and usually deliberately) exaggerated and comical in tone, and while probably considered somewhat "common", most of these usages are now quite broadly accepted and are in general not considered overly offensive. It was this peculiar Australian usage pattern which obviously made it attractive to Doyle and Pickhaver as a title.

For example – one can tell someone to "go to buggery", which is a slightly stronger equivalent to the American expression "take a hike". The adverb "buggered" is also widely used and often refers to a broken or defective object ("my car's buggered") or is used as a means of expressing tiredness or exhaustion ("I'm buggered after that bushwalk"). The word can also be used as an expression of lack, such as in the phrase "There's bugger-all (money) left in the bank". But this novel range of usages is evidently only inoffensive in Australia, and the use of the word "buggery" in the series title was a source of some amazement to overseas guests such as Canadian comedian Mike Myers.

== Format ==
Essentially a blend of variety, talk show, and sketch comedy. The show interspersed interviews with guests, giveaway segments, discussion and comment by Roy & HG, music segments, pre-taped comedy inserts (including a soap opera parody performed by a number of famous sporting personalities including footballers Paul Sironen and Warren Boland) and a closing musical performance by a well-known Australasian music star of the past.

The guest interviews were often highlights of the show, as Roy and HG honed their often revealing two-handed "good cop/bad cop" interview style. Typically HG opened by asking some seemingly innocuous questions (some of which had a subtle sting) and he was followed by Roy, who had a much more probing and sarcastic manner and specialised in asking questions that put the guest "on the spot". One memorable interview was with actor/comedian Mike Myers who jokingly flirted with Doyle and the two danced arm-in-arm afterwards. Other notable guests included actor Roger Moore, singer Pat Benatar, musician Nick Cave and comedian/writer Alexei Sayle. One celebrity who turned down an invitation to appear was Sting as his manager was concerned about the show's title.

Other regular features included:-

- The Nissan Cedrics, a singing duo composed of Dannielle Gaha and Louise Anton who provided musical links and jingles to introduce guests and regular segments and also occasionally performed full-length songs. The name of the duo was a tribute to the classic 1960s car. They released a self-titled album of cover songs in 1997.
- A segment where an Australian sporting or entertainment celebrity would appear in a pre-filmed sketch where they would mime an old classic song. One memorable example was actor Andrew McFarlane who acted out a WW2 movie spoof whilst miming Dean Martin's "Everybody Loves Somebody".
- The weekly 'This is Living' giveaway where the couple or party that Roy & HG judged to be the best-dressed amongst the studio audience were given a prize. In the first series, the prize was an over-sized 'Meat-Tray' over which Roy and HG gave a lurid description of how they hunted and shot it earlier that week. In the later series, the prize was a special night-out for the winners to a venue carefully chosen by Roy & HG. Amongst the memorable evenings were a smorgasboard dinner and pokies at an RSL club, a visit to a Greyhound track and front-row seats to a showing of Kenneth Branagh's 4-hour movie version of Hamlet.
- Ian 'Turps' Turpie performed as 'Club President' (MC) for all 4 years of the show, being referred to as The Giant of the G-Chord and he also performed musical numbers. In addition, he starred in several comedy sketches, each of which ran for a number of short episodes. These were;- Turps about the House in which he played the flat-mate of the Nissan Cedrics, a police drama Sam Stain which also starred actor Harold Hopkins and TV presenter Indira Naidoo and Star Trek spoof Captain Ajax which also featured Hopkins (whose character's name was Dogrooter) and a sultry cameo from Network Ten newsreader Anne Fulwood.
- As already mentioned above, another regular segment was the soap-opera parody Ian which, in addition to footballers Sironen and Boland, also featured musician Col Joye, athlete and actress Lisa Forrest, cricketer Greg Matthews and TV presenter Annette Shun Wah. When introducing the segment, HG usually described the show as extraordinary people doing bloody ordinary things.

== 2000 Olympics ==
The duo scored their greatest successes and reached a peak of popularity in 2000. Having moved to the commercial Seven Network, the official Australian broadcaster for the 2000 Summer Olympics, they were ideally placed to present a new version of the This Sporting Life concept. The series, The Dream with Roy and HG, gained record ratings and won them a huge new audience, and made their unofficial animal mascot, 'Fatso the Fat-Arsed Wombat', into a national icon.

== Awards ==
- At the 39th Annual TV Week Logie Awards held in 1997, the program won the Logie for the 'Most Outstanding Achievement In Comedy'
- At the 39th Annual TV Week Logie Awards held in 1997, the program was nominated for the 'Most Popular Comedy Program'
- At the 40th Annual TV Week Logie Awards held in 1998, the program was nominated for the Logie for the "Most Outstanding Achievement In Comedy".

== See also ==
- List of Australian television series
