= Greig Pickhaver =

Australian comedian

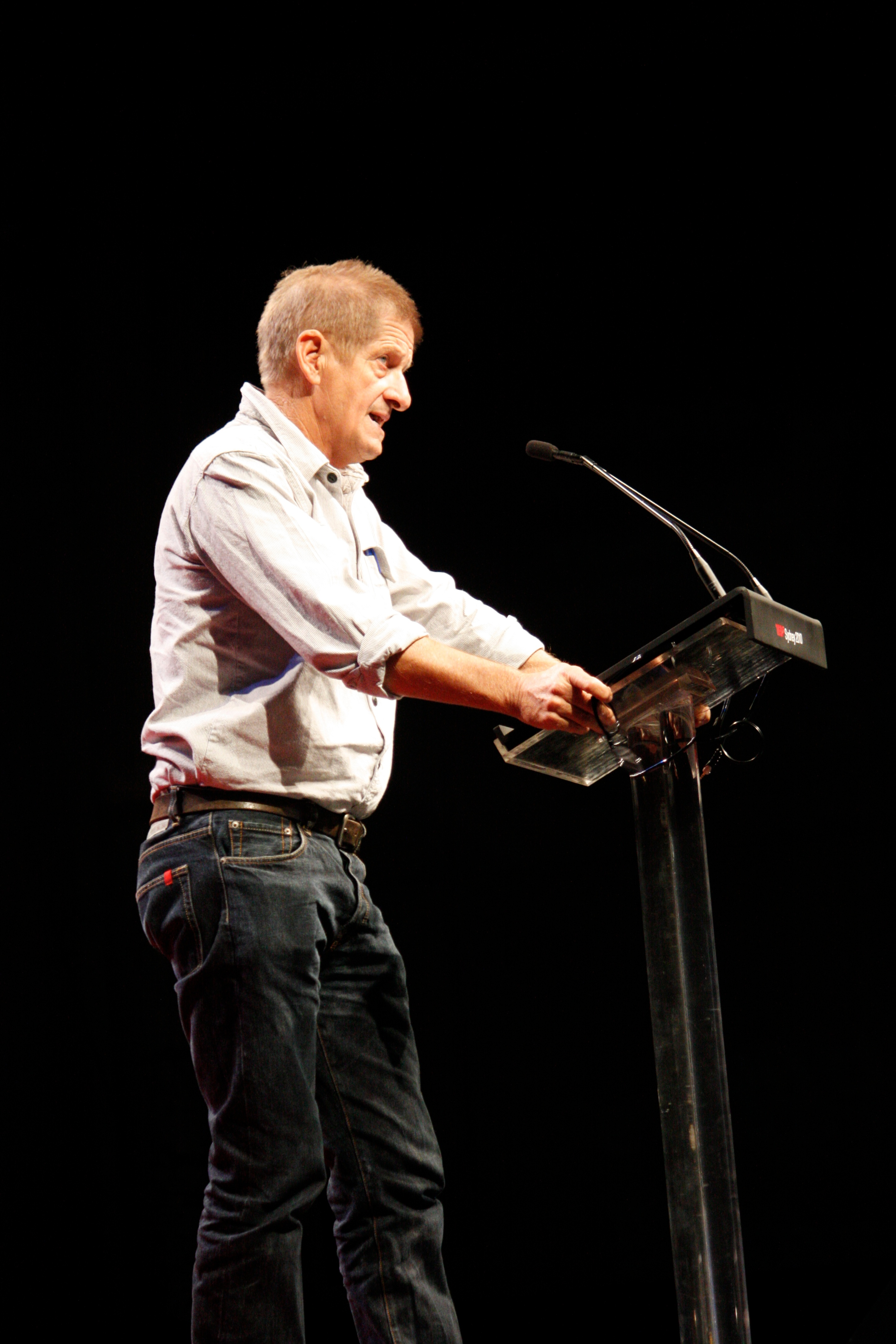
- Pickhaver in 2010
- Born: February 10, 1948 (age 78); Myrtle Bank, South Australia
- Other name: H. G. Nelson
- Occupations: Television host; writer; actor; radio host; theatre actor; author
- Years active: 1986–present
- Known for: This Sporting Life 1986–2008; Club Buggery 1996–1997; The Dream with Roy and HG 2000
- Parent(s): Gordon Pickhaver; Beryl Skuce

Gordon Greig Pickhaver AM (born 10 February 1948) is an Australian actor, comedian and writer, who forms one half of the satirical sports comedy duo Roy and HG as the excitable sports announcer HG Nelson. (Note: Pickhaver is adamant in pronouncing the "H" in "HG" as "haitch". This is contrary to the "aitch" as generally accepted in his home state of South Australia.) The award-winning duo teamed up in 1986 for the Triple J radio comedy program This Sporting Life, and were broadcast nationwide for 22 years, leading to several successful television spinoffs.

== Personal life ==
Pickhaver was born at Walwa private hospital, Myrtle Bank, South Australia, to parents Gordon Samuel Pickhaver, and Beryl Marion Rebecca Pickhaver née Skuce. His father was a World War II veteran who saw action in the Middle East and on the Kokoda Track and whose career was in the South Australian dairy industry. (Note: Gordon S. Pickhaver was co-author (with James Dez Marshall) of People, Places and Cheese in South Australia 1842–1984 Pagel Books 1986) Pickhaver has three sisters (Jane, Anne and Mary) and a brother, Mark. Pickhaver lived on Morphett Road, Warradale, South Australia up to the age of 15, and then the family moved to the suburb of Prospect, where he lived until the age of 22. He attended Oaklands Park Primary school, Brighton Secondary School, and for the last two years of high school Adelaide High School. He graduated from Flinders University and describes himself as dyslexic, having always relied heavily on memory and recall to achieve any academic results.

== Radio career ==
Pickhaver performed in plays at school and at university. After a stint as a roadie for Australian rocker Billy Thorpe in the early 1970s, he became involved in the Melbourne theatre co-operative The Pram Factory. He moved into radio broadcasting on 3RRR in Melbourne and developed the HG Nelson character while performing in the Melbourne radio sports comedy show Punter To Punter in the early 1980s.

Pickhaver met John Doyle in 1985 while both were playing minor characters in an SBS TV show, and they teamed up as Roy (a.k.a. Rampaging Roy Slaven) and HG in 1986. Their radio comedy program This Sporting Life was broadcast initially in Sydney and later nationally on the Australian Broadcasting Corporation's Triple J youth radio network. It was continuously on-air for a 22-year period till 2008. This Sporting Life was added to the National Film and Sound Archive's Sounds of Australia registry in 2013. Since March 2020, the Roy and HG characters have broadcast 'Bludging on the Blindside', on ABC radio on Saturdays through the football season, a sports program whose main focus is both celebrating and lampooning the culture and business of rugby league in Australia.

== Television and film career ==
With John Doyle as Rampaging Roy Slaven, Pickhaver has appeared on television shows such as The Dream with Roy and HG, This Sporting Life, Blah Blah Blah, Club Buggery, The Channel Nine Show, Planet Norwich, Win Roy and HG's Money, The Monday Dump, The Nation Dumps, The Ice Dream with Roy and HG, The Cream, The Dream in Athens, The Memphis Trousers Half Hour, and Roy and HG's Russian Revolution.

Pickhaver hosted It's a Knockout from 2011 to 2012 alongside former Hi-5 star Charli Robinson and sports presenter Brad McEwan. Pickhaver joined Stephen Quartermain and Alisa Camplin for the Sochi Tonight show during the Sochi 2014 Winter Olympics in February 2014, and was featured in the SBS series Who Do You Think You Are? in September 2015. Many of his television opportunities have been "alternative" sports presentation coverages of the Summer or Winter Olympics.

Pickhaver starred in the cult 1993 Australian comedy film This Won't Hurt a Bit opposite Jacqueline McKenzie. In 2003, he appeared in the political comedy The Honourable Wally Norman.

== Published works ==
- 1989: Pants off, this sporting life, by Roy Slaven and H. G. Nelson
- 1994: Where it all went wrong [sound recording] : address delivered by H. G. Nelson, anti-smoking activist, to the National Press Club, Canberra on World No Tobacco Day, 1 June 1994
- 1994: Boys and balls, by Brian Nankervis; in the press box: Roy Slaven and H. G. Nelson
- 1996: Petrol, bait, ammo & ice, by H. G. Nelson, with a foreword by Roy Slaven; illustrated by Reg Mombassa
- 1999: It's yours for a sawn-off! : Sameranch's Sydney, by H. G. Nelson; illustrations by James de Vries
- 2006: The really stuffed guide to good food 2006, edited by H. G. Nelson
- 2008: Sprays, by H. G. Nelson
- 2011: My life in SHORTS, by H. G. Nelson
