= Bludging on the Blindside =

Australian sports comedy radio show

- Genre: Sports journalism, improvisational comedy
- Running time: 2 hours (Saturdays 12pm–2pm)
- Country of origin: Australia
- Home station: ABC Local Radio (Note: Only on some metro and regional stations in New South Wales and Queensland; see #Broadcast.); ABC Sport
- Hosted by: Roy and HG
- Created by: John Doyle; Greig Pickhaver
- Original release: 14 March 2020 – present
- No. of series: 7
- No. of episodes: 200+
- Website: Official website

Bludging on the Blindside is an Australian satirical sports radio show hosted by comedians John Doyle and Greig Pickhaver, who play their characters Roy and HG: 'Rampaging' Roy Slaven, the retired sportsman turned commentator, and HG Nelson, the show's announcer. It has been broadcast on ABC Sport and some ABC Local Radio stations since March 2020, also becoming one of the ABC's most popular podcasts.

== History ==
At the start of 2020, the Australian Broadcasting Corporation (ABC) announced Roy and HG would return to the network after several years on Macquarie Sports Radio and Triple M. Their first gig was on the ABC's youth network Triple J for This Sporting Life, which ran from 1986 to 2008.

The first episode of Bludging on the Blindside was broadcast on 14 March 2020, with the inaugural season wrapping up on 3 October 2020.

== Format and comedy ==
As with This Sporting Life, Doyle (who plays Roy Slaven) and Pickhaver (HG Nelson) improvise the show entirely. Pickhaver said they "don't actually write the show, [they] trawl threads that are unravelling from the carpet of sport and join them together to have fun with them." Andrew McMillen described Roy and HG's chemistry in an article for The Australian: "At its heart, the show is purely about trying to make the other bloke crack up laughing, often by suggesting completely outrageous ideas with a straight face."

Roy and HG's brand of comedy involves many layers of inside jokes. For example, they constantly refer to Peter V'landys, the National Rugby League administrator, as "Feathers" or the "Man of Feathers", while Gillon McLachlan, the Australian Football League administrator, is branded the "murderer".

== Broadcast ==
Bludging on the Blindside is broadcast on the ABC Sport radio station and some ABC Local Radio stations in New South Wales and Queensland, including 702 ABC Sydney, 612 ABC Brisbane, plus 666 ABC Canberra, and several regional stations. This is because the primary focus of the show is rugby league, which is most popular east of the Barassi Line and less so in other markets such as Melbourne.

The show is also released as a podcast, available on ABC listen and other online podcast platforms.
