= This Sporting Life (disambiguation) =

This Sporting Life is a 1963 drama film.

This Sporting Life may also refer to:

- This Sporting Life (novel), the 1960 novel on which the film is based
- This Sporting Life (radio program), an Australian radio programme
  - This Sporting Life (Roy & HG album), a 2016 retrospective comedy album
- This Sporting Life (Skink and Demoralised album), a 2010 album by Skint & Demoralised
- "This Sporting Life", a 1965 Ian Whitcomb song
- "This Sporting Life", a 1981 The Mekons song

== See also ==
- Sporting Life (disambiguation)
