= Geoff Morrell (actor) =

Australian actor (born 1958)

- Born: 19 February 1958 (age 68); Fairfield, New South Wales, Australia
- Education: University of Wollongong (Bachelor of Arts)
- Occupation: Actor
- Years active: 1985–present
- Known for: Murder Call; Grass Roots; Blue Heelers
- Spouse: Caroline Brazier (m.2008-2015)
- Children: 2

Geoff Morrell (born 19 February 1958) is an Australian actor.

== Early life ==
Morrell was born in Fairfield in Western Sydney, where his father was a schoolteacher. The family moved to Wollongong when Morrell was nine. He finished high school without doing well, academically. He subsequently worked at the Port Kembla Steelworks, but decided to repeat year 12, and after applying himself second time around, topped the HSC.

Morrell received a NSW Teacher's Scholarship and studied a Bachelor of Arts at the University of Wollongong. While studying, he made his stage debut as Algernon in The Importance of Being Earnest. He was also President of the Student Representative Council. He graduated in 1979.

== Career ==
Morrell began his career in theatre acting, becoming a founding member of the Theatre South organisation. In 1983, he briefly moved to England, featuring in a number of productions there.

In 1985, he branched into film acting, with a minor role in a telemovie version of Oscar Wilde's Lady Windermere's Fan. Over the next few years, he moved between film and theatre, starring in productions such as Macbeth and King Lear, as well as several supporting roles in films, telemovies, miniseries and regular series. These included notable Australian films Blackrock and Oscar and Lucinda. He has had guest roles in the series The Secret Life of Us, Stingers and Farscape.

Morrell starred as Harry in Australia's first production of Michael Gow's play Away, which was performed by the Griffin Theatre Company and premiered at the Stables Theatre in Sydney on 7 January 1986.

After filming Oscar and Lucinda, Morrell won the role of forensic scientist Lance Fisk in the series Murder Call, which screened from 1997 to 1999. In 2000, he won one of his most significant roles to date, as the protagonist of the ABC series Grass Roots. The series was not renewed after the 2001 season, and Morrell followed this with a major role in the ABC telemovie Marking Time, as the father of a boy in love with an asylum seeker.

Morrell won the 2000 AFI Award for Best Actor for Grass Roots, and has been nominated four times, for Fallen Angels (1997), Grass Roots second series, Changi (2001) and Marking Time. He has been nominated for three Silver Logies for Grass Roots (first and second series) and Changi.

In 2004, Morrell made a move into the mainstream when he became one of four new actors to join the long-running police series Blue Heelers, on which he played Sergeant Mark Jacobs. In September 2004, there was speculation that the ABC would commission a third series of Grass Roots. However, Morrell stated that the ABC "may have missed its chance", and as he remained contracted to Blue Heelers, would likely not have been able to participate if the series did return. Due to family commitments, Morrell chose to leave Blue Heelers.

He has also been involved in the film Right Here Right Now. In 2010, Morrell made a return to ABC to star alongside Richard Roxburgh in the first series of Rake. Morrell played the role of Joe Sandilands, a fictional NSW Attorney-General involved in the inside wheeling and dealing of the NSW Labor.

In 2015, he appeared as Inspector Clive Small, in the two-part miniseries Catching Milat.

He appeared in the feature film Rogue, and Anthony Hayes' feature film debut Ten Empty. In 2010, he began work on the set of Cloudstreet, a television miniseries version of Tim Winton's novel. He plays the role of Lester Lamb.

Morrell has since appeared in numerous other productions including The Lord of the Rings: The Rings of Power. In 2023 Morrell was named as part of the cast in Foxtel drama High Country, and Stan series Thou Shalt Not Steal.

In 2024, Morrell was named as part of the cast for the Liam Neeson led The Ice Road 2: Road to the Sky. On 21 November 2024, Morrell was named for the second series of Mystery Road: Origin.

== Personal life ==
Morrell is married to Australian actress and NIDA alumni Caroline Brazier. They met while working on the 2007 Australian thriller Rogue, and were married in 2008.

He has two children together with his ex-wife Megan, whom he had married in the early 1980s.

Since 1995, Morrell has also been an accomplished visual artist, having held several solo exhibitions.

== Filmography ==
=== Film ===
Year	Title	Role	Notes
1992	The Girl Who Came Late (aka Daydream Believer)	Brad Hislop	
1994	No Worries	Ben Bell	
1996	Mr. Reliable (aka My Entire Life)	Sergeant Campbell	
1997	Blackrock	Stewart Ackland	
1997	Oscar and Lucinda	Charley Fig	
2000	Looking for Alibrandi	Mr. Barton	
2003	Ned Kelly	Robert Scott	
2004	Right Here Right Now	Paul	
2007	Lucky Miles	Peter Coode	
2007	Rogue	Allen Smith	
2008	Ten Empty	Ross	
2008	The View from Greenhaven	Theodore	
2009	Coffin Rock	George	
2010	Oranges and Sunshine	Walter	
2014	The Mule	John	
2017	Red Christmas	Joe	
2025	Ice Road: Vengeance	Spike	

=== Television ===
Year	Title	Role	Notes
1985	Lady Windemere's Fan	Mr. Hopper	TV film
1986	The Bill	Rod	1 episode
1986	The Monocled Mutineer	Aussie Gas Mask	2 episodes
1988	Rafferty's Rules	Alan Tillaman	Season 4, episode 9
1988	Captain James Cook	Perry	Miniseries, 3 episodes
1989	Round the Twist	Porter	1 episode
1991	Strangers	Frank	TV movie
1991	The Flying Doctors	Dr. Rex Waddington	1 episode
1993	G.P.	Neil Gordon	1 episode
1994	Heartbreak High	Allan Masters	1 episode
1995	Bordertown	Bates	Miniseries, 8 episodes
1995	Blue Murder	Les Knox	Miniseries, 1 episode
1996	Fallen Angels	Jack Landers	6 episodes
1997–1999	Murder Call	Det. Snr. Sgt. Lance Fisk	56 episodes
1998	Good Guys, Bad Guys	Beckett	1 episode
1998	Never Tell Me Never	Rehab Specialist	TV movie
2001	My Husband, My Killer	Bob Richardson	TV film
2001	BackBerner		1 episode
2001	The Secret Life of Us		2 episodes
2001	Changi	Major Dr. Rowdy Lawson	Miniseries, 6 episodes
2000–2003	Grass Roots	Col Dunkley	18 episodes
2003	Farscape	TR Holt	1 episode
2003	Stingers	Ron Moore	1 episode
2003	Marking Time	Geoff Fleming	Miniseries
2004	Go Big	Ian Patterson	TV film
2004–2005	Blue Heelers	Sergeant Mark Jacobs	59 episodes
2005	Second Chance		TV film
2006	All Saints	Chris Harrison	1 episode
2007	Curtin	Ben Chifley	TV film
2007	Bastard Boys	Chris Corrigan	Miniseries
2008	Emerald Falls	Jack Donnelly	TV film
2008	Sea Patrol	Lieutenant Commander Jack Freeman	Season 2, 1 episode
2008	Bed of Roses	Tibor Havel	4 episodes
2009	Rogue Nation	John Macarthur	2 episodes
2009	Packed to the Rafters	Tim Connelly	3 episodes
2010	Not Available	Remington	TV short film
2010	Rake	Joe Sandilands	Season 1, 7 episodes
2011	Small Time Gangster	Les	Miniseries, 8 episodes
2011	Cloudstreet	Lester Lamb	Miniseries, 3 episodes
2011	Winners & Losers	Paul Armstrong	4 episodes
2011–2012	Home and Away	Geoffrey King	8 episodes
2012	Dripping in Chocolate	Stuart Verger	TV film
2013	Miss Fisher's Murder Mysteries	Bob Ryan	1 episode
2013	Serangoon Road	Sir Philip Tuckworth	1 episode
2015	Catching Milat	Inspector Clive Small	Miniseries, 2 episodes
2015	8MMM Aboriginal Radio	Dave Cross	6 episodes
2015	Open Slather	Special Guest	3 episodes
2015–2016	Please Like Me	Bruce	2 episodes
2016	The Code	David Banks	Season 2, 6 episodes
2016	Deep Water	Don Lustigman	Miniseries, 2 episodes
2017	Top of the Lake: China Girl	Ray – Pathologist	3 episodes
2017	Fucking Adelaide	Geoff	Miniseries, 2 episodes
2018	Nippers of Dead Bird Bay	Judge	1 episode
2019	Blue Water Empire	Government Official	
2019	Harrow	Dr. Laurie Badcoe	Season 2, 4 episodes
2022–2024	The Lord of the Rings: The Rings of Power	Waldreg	7 episodes
2023	Wolf Like Me	Peter Stenning	2 episodes
2023	Compulsory Entertainment	Uncle Pete	1 episode
2024	High Country	Bryan Harris	7 episodes
2024	Thou Shalt Not Steal	Dick	Miniseries, 2 episodes
2025	Mystery Road: Origin	Phillip	6 episodes
2026	The Killings at Parrish Station	Tony Cooke	TV series

== Theatre ==
Year	Title	Role	Type
	Macbeth		Classical Theatre Co
	The Importance of Being Earnest	Algernon	University of Wollongong
1979	The Common Room		Teachers Federation Auditorium with Southern Cross Theatre Company for Sydney Festival
1980	The Con Man	David	Wollongong with Theatre South
1980	Man of La Mancha	Dr. Carrasco	Wollongong Conservatorium Theatre Company
1981	First People		NSW
1981	Norse Saga	Thorhall Hunter / Kol	NSW with Seagull Theatre-in-Education
1981	Travelling North	Freddy	Wollongong Technical College with Theatre South
1981; 1983	Might as Well Talk to Yourself (or Confusions)	Waiter / Others	Wollongong Technical College with Theatre South
1981	The Playboy of the Western World	Shawn Keogh	Wollongong Technical College with Theatre South
1982	Can't Pay? Won't Pay!		Wollongong Technical College with Theatre South
1982	Diggers' Darling		Wollongong Technical College, Clubbe Hall, Mittagong with Theatre South
1983	The Glass Menagerie		Wollongong Technical College with Theatre South
1983	What the Butler Saw		Wollongong Technical College with Theatre South
1983	On Our Selection		Wollongong Town Hall with Theatre South
1986	Away	Harry	Stables Theatre, Sydney with Griffin Theatre Company
1986	The Madras House		Sydney Opera House with STC
1986	The Seagull		Sydney Opera House with STC
1986	Don't Pay! Don't Pay!		Playhouse, Newcastle with Hunter Valley Theatre Company
1987	Trumpets and Raspberries		Wharf Theatre, Sydney with Theatre South for Sydney Festival
1987	Tom and Viv		Wharf Theatre, Sydney with STC
1987	Blood Relations	Das	Sydney Opera House, Playhouse Adelaide with STCSA & STC
1987	The Department	John	Seymour Centre, Sydney with Australian Elizabethan Theatre Trust
1988	King Lear	Edgar	Playhouse Adelaide
1988	Big and Little	Guitar Player / A Young Man / Man	Sydney Opera House with STC
1989	Top Silk	Trevor Fredericks	Seymour Centre, Sydney, Melbourne Athenaeum, Canberra Theatre, Playhouse Adelaide with MTC
1989	Hedda Gabler	Jörgen Tesman	Playhouse Adelaide with STCSA
1990	Other Times	Roo	Playhouse, Newcastle with Hunter Valley Theatre Company
1990	The Tempest		Belvoir Street Theatre, Sydney
1990	Hot Fudge and Icecream		Wharf Theatre, Sydney with STC
1991	Racing Demon		Wharf Theatre, Sydney with STC
1992	The Boy Who Climbed Windmills		Riverside Theatres Parramatta, Wharf Theatre, Sydney, Zenith Theatre, Sydney for Sydney Festival
1992	Time and the Room		Wharf Theatre, Sydney with STC
1993	Scenes from an Execution		Belvoir Street Theatre, Sydney
1994	Short Circuit		Seymour Centre, Sydney for Sydney Festival
1994	A Cheery Soul	Mr Wakeman / Furniture Removal Man 2	Her Majesty's Theatre, Adelaide with Queensland Theatre for Adelaide Festival of Arts
1994	Away		Riverside Theatres Parramatta with STC
1994	Oleanna	John	Wharf Theatre, Sydney, Geelong Arts Centre, Monash University, Melbourne, Fairfax Studio, Melbourne with STC & MTC
1995	The Malevolence		Belvoir Street Theatre, Sydney
1996	Pentecost		Wharf Theatre, Sydney with STC
1996-99	Speaking in Tongues	Pete / Neil / John	Stables Theatre, Sydney, Marian Street Theatre, Sydney with Griffin Theatre Company
1999	Things We Do For Love		Marian Street Theatre, Sydney
1999	Art	Serge	Theatre Royal, Sydney with Gordon Frost Organisation
2000	A Month in the Country	Arkady Sergyevich Islayev	Sydney Opera House with STC
2000	Life After George	George	Wharf Theatre with STC
2000	A Cheery Soul	Mr Wakeham	Sydney Opera House with STC & Company B Belvoir for Sydney Festival
2002	Man of La Mancha	Dr Sanson Carrasco / Duke	Regent Theatre, Melbourne, Capitol Theatre, Sydney
2004	Blithe Spirit	Charles	Sydney Opera House with MTC & STC
2005	Love Letters	Andrew Makepeace Ladd III	NIDA Parade Theatre, Sydney
2008	Rabbit	Father	Wharf Theatre with Sydney Theatre Company
2009	Ruben Guthrie	Peter	Belvoir Street Theatre, Sydney
2009	God of Carnage	Michel Vallon	Playhouse, Melbourne with MTC
2012	Australia Day	Brian	Playhouse Melbourne, Riverside Theatres Parramatta, Canberra Theatre Centre, Sydney Opera House with MTC & STC
2013	Vere (Faith)	Ralph / Roger	Dunstan Playhouse, Adelaide, Sydney Opera House with STCSA & STC
2016	The Blind Giant is Dancing	Michael Wells	Belvoir Street Theatre, Sydney
2016	The Great Fire	Patrick	Belvoir Street Theatre, Sydney
2017–19	Black is the New White	Dennison Smith	Wharf Theatre, Sydney, Playhouse Brisbane, IMB Theatre Wollongong, Roslyn Packer Theatre Sydney, Riverside Theatres Parramatta, Southbank Theatre, Melbourne, Dunstan Playhouse, Adelaide with STCSA & STC

== Awards ==
Year	Work	Award	Category	Result
2000	Grass Roots	AFI Awards	Best Actor in a Leading Role in a Television Drama	Won
1997	Fallen Angels	AFI Awards	Best Actor in a Leading Role in a Television Drama	Nominated
2001	Changi	AFI Awards	Best Performance by an Actor in a Telefeature or Miniseries	Nominated
2003	Grass Roots	AFI Awards	Best Actor in a Leading Role in a Television Drama or Comedy	Nominated
2004	Marking Time	AFI Awards	Best Actor in a Leading Role in a Television Drama or Comedy	Nominated
