= The Main Event (Australian game show) =

Australian television series

- Genre: Game show
- Created by: Craig Johnston
- Directed by: Adrian Woods
- Creative director: Craig Johnston
- Presented by: Larry Emdur
- Narrated by: Don Blake; Niel Chantler
- Opening theme: "Walking on Sunshine" by Katrina and the Waves
- Composers: Kimberley Rew; Jamie Rigg
- Country of origin: Australia
- Original language: English
- No. of seasons: 2

Production
- Executive producer: Lyle McCabe
- Producer: Bill Edmonds
- Running time: 60 minutes
- Production companies: Leisuretime Media; Craig Johnston Productions; Seven Network

Original release
- Network: Seven Network
- Release: 7 April 1991 – 22 November 1992

The Main Event was a weekly hour-long Australian game show that aired on the Seven Network from 1991 to 1992. The show was hosted by Larry Emdur, with Don Blake and Niel Chantler as announcers.

The series was created by former soccer player Craig Johnston, who was also listed as "Creative Director" in the ending credits.

== Game play ==
Two teams (one red and one yellow), each consisting of three celebrities in the studio and up to four family members at home, compete against each other to earn points. The team with the highest point score wins the game and a brand new car.

The number of points available is announced at the beginning of each round.

=== Round One ===
The first round is made up of several different mini-games that are presented in various playing orders.

==== What do you know? ====
The two teams race on the buzzers to answer. The first team to buzz in and answer correctly earns points. An incorrect answer locks out the team from further clues and gives the opposing team a chance to see the remainder of clues and answer. No penalty for an incorrect answer. There was only one buzzer per team. Team members who buzz in must answer individually and cannot confer with their partners. Questions in this round fit the following categories:

- Name That Tune: A song is played in the background of a music video specially made for the show. The contents of the video are also clues to the song's title. Guessing the title of the song earns 10 points.
- Odd One Out: Five items are listed. Four of the items have something in common and one does not. Guessing the one that does not belong earns 10 points.

==== Who am I? ====
A video is played featuring progressively older photographs and progressively larger descriptive clues given to the identity of a famous person. Guessing the identity of the person earns 10 points.

==== Name That Film ====
A film clip is played featuring progressively larger descriptive clues given to the title of a movie. Guess the title of the film and the team earns 10 points.

==== Home Team Question ====
A film clip and descriptive clue is played. A question and three answer choices about the subject of the clip is asked to the home viewers. The family can confer but only the captain can buzz in and give the answer. The first family to buzz in and answer correctly earns 20 points. An incorrect answer gives the opposing family a chance to answer from the remaining choices. No penalty for an incorrect answer.

=== Round Two – Picture This ===
Six hidden and numbered pictures appear on the game board. Each member of each team, alternating one at a time, chooses a number. The picture containing part of a subject is revealed. A correct identification is worth 10 points apiece. No penalty for an incorrect guess. Team members can confer with each other, but only the controlling player can guess.

=== Round Three – Who Lives Here? ===
This round is played one team at a time in three parts.

==== Part One – Who Lives Here? ====
The celebrities and home players on one team are shown a video containing the inside and outside contents of the home of a famous celebrity. With the contents as clues, the celebrities must guess the identity of the home's owner. Then the home players either agree with the celebrities or make their own guess if they don't. If the identity is correct, the team earns 20 points. However, if the home team gave a different identity, and it was correct, the team earned 40 points. Again, there is no penalty for a wrong guess.

==== Part Two – Under the Spotlight ====
The celebrities were shown a video containing the celebrity from part one giving answers to fifteen questions, with the questions edited out of the video. Then, the celebrities were given 30 seconds to remember five of the responses mentioned in the video and try to match them to the questions asked. The questions were asked one at a time, and the team can pass if they cannot give an answer. If five responses were correctly matched, the team earned 20 points. The team must match all five responses in order to earn the points.

==== Part Three – Would You Believe… ====
The home players were then shown a video containing the celebrity from part one giving a statement about themselves that may or may not be true. Then, the team decided if the statement was true or false. A correct response earns the team 20 points, with no penalty for an incorrect response.

The round was then repeated for the opposing team with a different celebrity.

=== Round Four – Who is This? ===
This round is played on the buzzers in two parts.

==== Part One – Who is This? ====
The home teams are shown electronically pixilated faces of well known celebrities along with a vocal description. As the clues get larger, the picture gets slowly restored. The first member of the first team to buzz in and answers correctly earns 10 points. The first two identities are played by the adults and the third is played by the children. The winner of the third identity also wins a special related prize.

==== Part Two – What Happens Next? ====
The celebrities are shown a video that is stopped at a specified point. Both teams are then given three choices to predict what happens next in the video. The first team to buzz in makes a selection, and then the opposing team makes a selection from the remaining two choices. The team with the correct selection earns 20 points. No penalty for an incorrect selection.

=== Round Five – Observation ===
This round is played one team at a time. The celebrities on one team are shown a film clip from a movie or television series. A question is asked to one of the celebrity teammates about something that occurred on the clip. The celebrities cannot confer with each other in this round. After the team member responds, a portion of the clip was repeated revealing the answer. A correct answer earned 20 point. However, an incorrect answer deducted 20 points from the team's score. Each team member was asked a different question from left to right. Sometimes all questions are asked by a special guest celebrity appearing in studio or on video that is related to the film clip.

The team with the highest score at the end of this round wins a prize. Anything from free groceries for a year to a $5,000(AUS) Citibank Cash Management Account, the prize is theirs to keep no matter what happens in the game.

=== Round Six – Championship ===
This round is played one team at a time. The home team that was leading in score going into the round was given the choice of two categories, with the one not chosen going to the opposing team. The home team that was trailing in score was then given 45 seconds to answer five questions, each with a choice of two answers, in the specified category. A correct answer earns 20 points and an incorrect answer deducts 20 points. Then the home team that was leading in score played similarly with their chosen category. The leading team played the round even if the trailing team failed to tie or surpass the leaders score.

The team with the highest score at the end of the round was declared the winner of the game and won a brand new car. The losing team won a cash consolation prize.

== Celebrities ==
Among the celebrities who either competed or appeared as a special guest on The Main Event included:

- Kym Wilson
- Agro
- Louise Anton
- Mary Coustas
- Lisa Curry
- Robert DiPierdomenico
- Nick Giannopoulos
- Wally Lewis
- Barton Lynch
- Greg Matthews
- Bruce McAvaney
- Georgie Parker
- Guy Pearce
- Collette Roberts
- Shirley Strachan
- Adriana Xenides
- Simon Wilton
- Chelsea Brown
- Guy Leech
- Maria Venuti
- Lorrae Desmond
- Joan Sydney
- Lynda Stoner
- Anne-Maree Biggar
- Judith McGrath
- Diane Smith
- Hazel Phillips
- Megan Williams
- Michael Horrocks
- Emily Symons
- Dannii Minogue
- Craig McLachlan
- Mat Stevenson
- Fiona Coote
- Jeanne Little
- Jackie Love

American actors George Kennedy and Darius McCrary also made appearances as special guests.

== Sets and remotes ==
The in-studio set was designed by set designers Diaann Wajion and Phil McLaren as a theatre in the round in the shape of a two-level football stadium complete with cheerleaders and a jumbotron-style video screen. Episodes were filmed at the Channel 7 studios located in Epping, New South Wales.

Two remote broadcast units were used for presenting live broadcasts of the family teams via satellite from their homes throughout Australia. Additionally, the new car is shown pulling up into each family's driveway by a special celebrity driver during the course of the show. At the end of each show the winning family is shown celebrating in and around the car they won.

== Theme music ==
The theme music is an instrumental version of the international hit song Walking on Sunshine, originally composed by Kimberley Rew for the UK band Katrina and the Waves. This version arranged by series music composer Jamie Rigg featured female vocalists repeatedly singing The Main Event as its only lyric.

== International versions ==
Country	Name	Host	Network	Premiere	Finale
France	Le Jeu/Score à battre	William Leymergie	France 2	21 September 1992	26 February 1993
United Kingdom	The Main Event	Chris Tarrant	BBC1	1 May 1993	24 July 1993
