= Louise Anton =

- Born: Louise Joy Despina Antonas; Perth, Western Australia
- Genres: Contemporary, Pop, Balladeer
- Occupations: Singer, Songwriter, Voice Artist, Live Performer & Concert Host
- Instruments: Voice, Piano
- Years active: 1981–present
- Labels: Warner Music, Flashpoint Music
- Publisher: Flashpoint Music
- Website: https://www.louiseanton.com

Louise Anton, also known as Louise Antonas, is an Australian singer-songwriter and musician.

She was one half of singing duo The Nissan Cedrics, with Dannielle Gaha, on ABC-TV comedy show Club Buggery from 1995, which was hosted by Roy and HG. The Nissan Cedrics released "Going for a Song" in 1997.

Anton won the inaugural APRA/AMCOS UTAS Stephen Schwartz Songwriting award in 2010 and was invited by American Composer Burt Bacharach to perform ahead of American singer Dion Warwick at the Sydney Opera House.

Anton recorded her debut solo album True Believer with Australian producer and mentor Harry Vanda at Flashpoint Music which was released in 2008.

== Career ==
Born in Perth, Western Australia, Anton began songwriting at 9 and performing solo voice and piano gigs by 16. Her professional career began in the mid-1980's on STW Channel Nine Perth as the host of locally-produced TV talent show "Perth's Young Entertainers".

Alongside the show, Anton was known for putting Humphrey B. Bear and Flapper the Elephant to bed nightly for younger viewers, and would perform live with the characters at festivals, functions and events.

In 1988, Anton was named Australian Ambassador to represent Australia in Tokyo, Japan at an Australian tourism festival. She received a United Nations of Australia Award for her services to the arts in 1987.

Moving to Sydney in 1988, Anton appeared as a regular solo performer on Nine Network's The Midday Show with Ray Martin, Hey Hey It!s Saturday with Daryl Somers, Good Morning Australia with Bert Newton, The Steve Vizard Show, The Eric Bana Show Live, and Andrew Denton's Sydney Olympic TV Special.

In 1987, Anton was invited to perform at The Viná Del Mar International Song Festival in Chile. The festival was staged to a live audience of 65,000 and televised live to over two million people. Her chosen song, "It's Only Love", gained 3rd place in the competition.

In 1991, Anton won the lead role of Sandy in the David Atkins/Gordon Frost Australian production of Grease the musical, starring alongside Guy Pearce. The production toured nationally around Australia and New Zealand with guest appearances as Danny by Nick Giannopoulos and Miquel Ayesa.

In the mid-1990's, Australian comedy duo Roy & HG invited Anton to join their cult ABC TV show Club Buggery as one half of the singing duo The Nissan Cedrics alongside fellow Australian singer Dannielle Gaha. The singing duo went on to record an album "Going For A Song", produced by Paul Gray of Australian 1980's funk band Wa Wa Nee.

In 2003 and 2004, Anton was backing vocalist and voice coach for both season one and season 2 of Australian Idol. Each season ended with a national tour of Australia staged as arena style concerts with a live band and renowned Australian musical director John Foreman at the helm.

In 2005, Anton joined The Wrights super group, recording a cover of the Vanda & Young hit Evie (song) which was performed on a live Television broadcast WAVE AID at the Sydney Cricket Ground. The same year she recorded Jump In My Car" with David Hasselhoff, produced by Harry Vanda and released through Sony/BMG Australia. Anton later performed alongside Hasselhoff for Foxtel's 10th Anniversary Special.

Anton met American songwriter Burt Bacharach in 2006 in Sydney. Bacharach invited Anton to open for Dionne Warwick at The Sydney Opera House on the main concert stage. Anton went on to perform a live version of her debut album True Believer ahead of Warwick gracing the stage.

After being signed to Flashpoint Music in early 2000s, Anton finished recording her self-penned debut solo album "True Believer" with music producer Harry Vanda in 2008. One of the tracks off the album "Who'll Speak For Love" was by personal invitation from Burt Bacharach and Tim Rice for Anton to record. String arranger and composer Larry Muhoberac wrote intricate string arrangements for the album, which were recorded by a live string ensemble.

In 2010, Anton received the inaugural Stephen Schwartz UTAS APRA/AMCOS award for her self-written song "Here I Am" which was accepted in a ceremony in the Sydney Town Hall later that same year.

Anton pursued a career as a Session singers recording a variety of TV and radio commercials, album guest vocals and singing live with many Australian and international artists including John Farnham, Tom Jones, Renée Geyer, Bernard Fanning, Neil Finn, Burt Bacharach, Dionne Warwick, Tim Rice, Sting, Roger Moore, Mike Myers, Leo Sayer, Hoodoo Gurus, Jimmy Webb, Don McLean, David Hasselhoff, Kerrie Biddell, Barbara Morrison, Jimmy Little, Vince Jones, Vika and Linda Bull, Kate Ceberano, Marcia Hines, Jon Stevens, Billy Thorpe and John Waters.

Anton went on to tour the UK, Europe, Asia and the Middle East before moving back to her hometown of Perth and remains a working musician, recording artist and entertainer.

== Discography ==
=== Albums ===
| Title | Artist | Released | Label | Format |
|---|---|---|---|---|
| Going For A Song | The Nissan Cedrics | 1997 | Warner Music | CD |
| Origin Best – Compilation | Louise Anton/Various | 2007 | Origin Music | CD |
| True Believer | Louise Anton | 2008 | Flashpoint Music | CD/Streaming |
| True Believer Re-Release | Louise Anton | 2025 | Flashpoint Music | Streaming |

=== Singles ===
| Title | Artist | Released | Label | Format |
|---|---|---|---|---|
| Jump In My Car | David Hasselhoff – Louise Anton Female Singer | 2006 | Sony BMG | CD/Streaming |
| Evie (Parts 1,2,3) | The Wrights – Supergroup | 2008 | Flashpoint Music | CD/Streaming |
| True Believer | Louise Anton | 2008 | Flashpoint Music | CD/Streaming |
| Here I Am | Louise Anton | 2010 | Flashpoint Music | Streaming |
| Having A Few | John Paul Young – Louise Anton Writer | 2006 | Flashpoint Music | CD |

== Sources ==
1. ^Apra/Amcos – Inaugural Stephen Schwartz Award – September 2010
2. ^Australian Arts Review – On The Couch – 23 June 2021
3. ^The Mandurah Mail – The Singing Studio – 14th September 2022
4. ^The West Australian – Charity Fundraiser – 15 February 2015
5. ^Mandurah Performing Arts Centre – Career Interview – 21 September 2021
6. ^Today Tonight Interview – Travelling East for Music Career – 2012
7. ^Music Mind Podcast – Brian Hayes Interview – 24 July 2024
8. ^Channel Nine Perth – 50 Year Anniversary Special – 17 June 2015
9. ^Wave Aid Tsunami Relief Concert – Sydney Cricket Ground – 2005
