= Changi (miniseries) =

2001 Australian television miniseries

- Genre: Drama / war
- Created by: John Doyle
- Developed by: Australian Broadcasting Corporation
- Directed by: Kate Woods
- Starring: Stephen Curry; Leon Ford; Matthew Newton; Mark Priestley
- Theme music composer: Mario Millo
- Country of origin: Australia
- Original language: English / Japanese
- No. of episodes: 6

Production
- Executive producer: Tim Pye
- Producers: Bill Hughes; Tim Pye
- Running time: 60 minutes

Original release
- Network: ABC Television
- Release: 14 October – 18 November 2001

Changi is a six-part Australian television miniseries broadcast by ABC TV in 2001. It originally aired from 14 October 2001 to 18 November 2001.

== Overview ==
The series follows the trials and tribulations of six fictional Australian soldiers interned at the Changi prisoner of war camp in Singapore during World War II.

Changi is presented as a frame story, with six older war veterans reuniting in 1999 to share their experiences and memories of their time as young men at the camp. The series is also notable for featuring scenes of toilet humour and black comedy in an otherwise serious production, a deliberate inclusion on the part of writer John Doyle, better known for his comedic alter-ego Rampaging Roy Slaven.

Doyle originally envisaged the series as a sitcom with the working title of Worn Out & Weary and he first pitched the idea to the ABC as such. It was only later in the writing phase that he decided to switch to drama, albeit with elements of humour remaining as a prominent feature.

A total of 53 sets had to be built for the miniseries, standing in for the camp, parts of Singapore and the Malayan jungle. The series was shot in four locations and in studio sets around Sydney. The ABC invested AUD 6 million (USD 6188992) on the production, a figure representing one-sixth of the ABC's annual drama budget.

Two cast members portraying the older versions of the main characters previously served in World War II. Bud Tingwell served as a fighter pilot while Slim DeGrey was actually imprisoned as a POW at the Changi camp after the fall of Singapore to the Japanese.

The series was directed by Kate Woods who, at the time, was best known for directing the successful Australian film Looking for Alibrandi (2000) and who, in more recent years, has become a successful television director in the United States.

== Cast ==
- Old David Collins - Charles 'Bud' Tingwell
- Young David Collins - Matthew Newton
- Old Gordon - Frank Wilson
- Young Gordon - Anthony Hayes
- Old Bill Dwyer - Terry Norris
- Young Bill Dwyer - Leon Ford
- Old Curley - Slim DeGrey
- Young Curley - Mark Priestley
- Old Eddie - Bill Kerr
- Young Eddie - Stephen Curry
- Old Tom - Desmond Kelly
- Young Tom - Matthew Whittet
- Major Dr Rowdy Lawson - Geoff Morrell
- Lieutenant Aso - Tsushima Gotaro
- Colonel Nakamura - Misawa Shingo
- Old Kate - Jill Perryman
- Young Kate - Mary Docker
- Ken - John Howard
- Nerida - Sacha Horler
- Betty & Joanne - Katherine Slattery
- General Tanaka - Ken Senga
- Captain Shindo - Ishihara Tatsumi
- Dr Hurrell - Peter Carroll
- Old Vi - Marie Armstrong
- Young Vi - Rebecca Murphy
- Todd - Simon Maiden
- Lisa - Nadine Garner
- Old Joyce - Judi Farr
- Young Joyce - Eliza Logan
- Bertie Jenkins - Joel McIlroy
- Father Keogh - Simon Chilvers
- Lofty Morgan - Christopher James Baker
- John - Ned Manning

== Episodes ==
1999. Six ageing former POWs who spent three and a half years in Changi are each preparing for the reunion of 'The Secret 9', the name of the close-knit group of six POWs whose mutual support and friendship sustained them throughout their experiences in the camp.

Since the end of the war, the group have held reunions every nine years and this upcoming one will most likely be their last. As the date of the reunion draws near, each of the veterans find his memories ignited by a sight or sound associated with their traumatic experiences.

No.	Title	Directed by	Written by	Original release date
1	"Seeing is Believing"	Kate Woods	John Doyle	14 October 2001
David, a successful property developer (now retired), has recently undergone eye surgery and is temporarily blinded. The confinement of his condition forces him to confront memories that he has suppressed ever since the war. In 1942, the young David arrives at Changi with thousands of other Allied POWs after the fall of Singapore. He meets five other young Australians who will become his closest friends in the camp - Gordon, Eddie, Tom, Bill and Curley. Whilst on a work detail outside the camp, David is savagely beaten by Japanese guards and is temporarily blinded with concussion. Left behind, he is later picked up by other Japanese troops who are herding a group of local civilians. Forced to stand on the edge of a pit, the civilians are shot by the Japanese. David is missed in the crush and he falls into the pit where he is buried by the bodies of the slain Singaporeans. After the Imperial soldiers depart, David somehow manages to claw his way out and his new friends find him and return him to the camp. In the present day, the memories return in painful fragments, after being hidden for so long. His lifelong refusal to talk about his experiences in the war has strained his marriage but his wife Kate has stuck by him nonetheless although she dreads the approaching reunion and the emotional difficulties it will bring.
2	"Gordon’s Will"	Kate Woods	John Doyle	21 October 2001
Gordon senior is visited at home by his son Ken, with whom he has a difficult relationship. An argument about inheritance brings on a severe stroke, hospitalising Gordon and leaving him paralysed down one side. His granddaughter Nerida, to whom he is closer than Ken, reads to him the invitation to the reunion. Gordon’s immobility makes his thoughts go back to his time in Changi. Of the six friends, Gordon is the only one who experienced actual combat during the battle of Malaya, the other five men having arrived as reinforcements just in time for the Allied surrender. The toughest and most outspoken of the group, Gordon is singled out for attention by Lieutenant Aso, the camp’s second-in-command. Refusing to salute the bad-tempered young officer, Gordon is forced to stand upright on a box in an open compound. Gordon remains defiant, even when Aso cuts off one of his toes. His five friends help him through the ordeal by finding a British POW who looks like Gordon to take his place at night, allowing him to get some rest. Finally, the camp’s commander Colonel Nakamura, intervenes, ordering Aso to cease the futile exercise. Back in the present day, Gordon is awake, revealing he has been feigning unconsciousness during the past several days in hospital. He tells his unpleasant son Ken that it will be his granddaughter Nerida who will be the main beneficiary of his will.
3	"Private Bill"	Kate Woods	John Doyle	28 October 2001
Bill, a much respected and loved University mathematics professor, is about to retire. He is visited by one of his students, Joanne, who bears a striking resemblance to a woman from Bill’s past. Joanne shows him a photo of her grandmother Betty and it turns out that she and Bill were lovers prior to the war. In Changi, a young Bill meets Dr Hurrell, a British civilian academic who instils in Bill his love of mathematics. A Japanese General named Tanaka arrives and accuses Nakamura and Aso as having been too soft on the prisoners. To Bill’s horror, Tanaka executes a friend of his named Morgan. Aso sees Tom, a talented artist and musician, drawing and forces him to sketch a portrait of Nakamura. Unbeknown to the Japanese, the gang of friends swap the picture for an offensive caricature which is unveiled in front of Nakamura and Tanaka. Aso vows revenge on the Secret 9. Shortly after arriving home from the war, Bill visits Betty only to discover that she, having assumed Bill to be dead, has married another man. Back in the present day, Bill watches from his office as Joanne leaves and he breaks down in tears, still heart-broken at having lost the love of his life.
4	"Curley"	Kate Woods	John Doyle	4 November 2001
Curley is out practising for his approaching driving test. Dazzled by sunlight, he loses concentration, sparking an outburst of road-rage from an impatient driver behind him. Shaken, he rests at home but the incident brings back memories of Changi. The senior-ranking Australian in the camp, Major Dr Rowdy Lawson, gets the POWs to organise a concert. Young Curley and Gordon dress up as campy versions of Nakamura and Aso and sing to the assembled prisoners and guards. Outraged, Aso gets revenge by punishing Curley for theft shortly afterwards and throwing him in 'the hole', a dark, dank pit. Surviving on whatever scraps of food thrown to him, including a dead snake, Curley’s sanity begins to crack. But the Secret 9 restore his spirits by throwing down a piece of paper on which Tom has drawn an obscene comic mocking the camp’s commanders. After six weeks in the hole Curley, half-starved but alive, crawls out into the blinding sunlight.
5	"Eddie’s Birthday"	Kate Woods	John Doyle	11 November 2001
Eddie’s 78th birthday is approaching and he is shaving. He rubs his jaw as he remembers the ache of an old illness. His grandson Todd arrives at Eddie’s small, cluttered flat, bringing his girlfriend Lisa with him. More forthright than Todd, Lisa probes Eddie about his life and past. In Changi, it is now 1945 and the young Eddie is increasingly troubled by a painful toothache. A new Japanese officer, Captain Shindo, arrives, having been sent by Tanaka to improve discipline and productivity at the camp. Taking a dislike to Eddie, Shindo repeatedly beats him, causing his tooth to become infected and inflamed, leaving Eddie in absolute agony. With no anaesthetic, Dr Lawson operates on Eddie with his makeshift tools, removing the tooth. As Eddie slowly recovers, he asks his mates to shave him, as it is his 23rd birthday. With news arriving of the British victory in Burma, Shindo, realising the war is lost, gets drunk and staggers into the prison compound, savagely beating Eddie and the others of the Secret 9. A defiant Dr Lawson demands that he stop and to everyone's shock, the Captain draws his pistol and shoots himself in the head.
6	"Pacifying the Angels"	Kate Woods	John Doyle	18 November 2001
Tom, a widower living in an aged care hostel, has mixed feelings about the impending reunion, dreading the traumatic memories that it will bring back. On the day of the reunion, the six friends meet at an RSL. Even Gordon arrives, despite his condition. As the friends celebrate and remember, Tom’s thoughts return to the one night that he wants to forget, the final night in Changi. August 1945, the war is coming to an end. The Japanese are hurriedly evacuating the camp in chaotic fashion. Many of the guards are randomly shooting many of the Allied POWs who are either hiding or trying to flee. Tom, in a dazed shock at the events unfolding around him, wanders into the compound and is nearly shot dead by a guard but two British POWs rescue him. Dawn arrives and the surviving prisoners emerge to find the Japanese have all left, including Lieutenant Aso, his fate unknown. They discover the body of Colonel Nakamura who has taken his own life. Dr Lawson assembles the Australian POWs into ranks and leads them marching out of Changi. Tom, the most gentle and sensitive of the group, marries after the war but the relationship proves to be an unhappy one, as his wife eventually grows bored of his timid, introverted nature and she feels imprisoned by his silent brooding about the past. Tom, anxious to get back to the hostel before curfew, is the first to depart the reunion. As his friends wave farewell, Tom visualises them as the young men back in Changi, standing alongside Lawson, Aso and Nakamura, saying goodbye from his past.

== Reception ==
The series Changi was a ratings success. The final episode, which aired on ABC-TV on Sunday evening on 18 November 2001, was the second-most watched show that night in Australia.

Reviews for the series were mixed. Robin Oliver, writing in The Sydney Morning Herald, declared the series to be "immensely satisfying" and Robert Fidgeon, in Melbourne's Herald Sun, wrote that it was "one of the finest pieces of drama ever produced (in Australia)" Michael Fitzgerald, writing in Time, said that the series, despite some flaws, was "the finest, most thoughtful local drama since Australia's miniseries heyday in the 1980s... The series isn't about the history of Changi, it's about the idea of Changi and how it refracts through the years to become something repressed, mythologised and feared.... Most movingly, it's about the transfer of memory to the next generation."

Christopher Bantick, writing in Brisbane's Courier Mail, was scathing in his review about the series. He said that the series "is a long way from representing fairly or in a balanced way what went on in the notorious camp and is close to being a profligate waste of public money". Bantick referred to Changi as "sick" and a "bomb" that "deserves to fail." Stephen Garton, writing in 2002 in the Journal of Australian Studies, believed the series to be a missed opportunity. In his view, Changi portrayed "an enfeebled narrative of the POW experience – narrow, parochial, inward-looking, blind to the complexities of former prisoner's voices but attuned to a nostalgic vision... of the Anzac Legend."

== Controversy and criticism ==
The series Changi attracted considerable controversy when it first aired in 2001 and drew both praise and criticism from military historians, media commentators and real-life former POWs.

Peter Stanley, principal historian at the Australian War Memorial 1987–2007, was highly critical of the series: "It gives viewers a misleading and unrealistic idea of the POW experience and of their captors. The danger is that people either believe what they see on television or don't know what's wrong and right." According to Stanley, the series contained a number of historical inaccuracies.

- The massacre of POWs that occurs in the final episode never happened in the real Changi.
- POWs are depicted as saluting Japanese officers whereas in reality, they were required to bow. Also, the real-life Changi in-mates had to endure frequent roll-calls ('Tenko') which do not occur in the TV version.
- In the series, POWs and Japanese guards mingle frequently but in reality, the prisoners and the Japanese kept apart and rarely saw each other, the POWs having to run the camp themselves.
- In the series, the POWs mock their captors in a camp concert but according to Stanley, that could never have happened as 'Japanese guards were very conscious of preserving their dignity. In real POW camps, prisoners dared not make fun of Japanese guards. It just simply wouldn't have happened.'
- The camp is portrayed in the series as quite small, housing only a few hundred prisoners but the real Changi was much larger, being a permanent or temporary home to many thousands of Allied POWs.

A number of real-life former in-mates of Changi were interviewed for their opinions on the series and the responses varied greatly. Some ex-POWs declared the series to be a moving, accurate portrayal whilst others dismissed it as unrealistic, overly sanitised, inaccurate and guilty of failing to depict the hardships of the real camp. 'Half of its rubbish!', declared one former POW.

Historian Michael Cathcart praised the series, calling it 'a moving series that captured the suffering and comradeship that were at the heart of the prisoner of war experience...and a celebration of the powerful egalitarian spirit that is the Australian story'

John Doyle defended his work. 'It's a series that runs the risk of offending everyone and satisfying no one'. Doyle argued that the series 'was not history but art – an effort to be honest to the spirit not the facts of Changi. When you try to deal with such a tricky subject, you have to abandon naturalism.' Doyle claimed that he wanted the series to show how 'Australian humour and mateship allowed Australians to survive in greater numbers than other groups of prisoners.'

== Awards ==
The production won the Logie Award for the Most Outstanding Mini Series/Telemovie in 2002. Actors Geoff Morrell, Matthew Newton and Bud Tingwell were also nominated for Most Outstanding Actor Logies, and the mini series also received 3 AFI Award nominations.

== See also ==
- King Rat (Clavell novel), set in Changi
