= John Doyle (comedian) =

Australian comedian, actor and writer

- Born: John Patrick Doyle; 9 March 1953 (age 73); Lithgow, New South Wales, Australia
- Other names: Roy Slaven, Rampaging Roy Slaven
- Education: University of Newcastle (NSW)
- Occupations: Television host; writer; actor; radio host; theatre actor; author
- Years active: 1983–present
- Known for: This Sporting Life 1986–2008; Club Buggery 1996–1997; The Dream with Roy and HG 2000
- Spouse: Deanna Doyle

John Patrick Doyle AM (born 9 March 1953) is an Australian actor, writer, radio presenter and comedian best known for his character Rampaging Roy Slaven.

== Early life and education ==
Doyle was born in Lithgow, New South Wales in 1953 into a music-loving, Catholic household with three sisters, Deanna, Cathy, and Jen, and a brother, Tony. His mother was a business woman and his father a railway fettler. He was an altar boy for a time but lost interest in Catholicism with the introduction of contemporary changes in the mass, among other things.

He attended and was a prefect at De La Salle Academy in Lithgow before graduating from the then Newcastle Teachers' College in 1973 with a Diploma of Teaching (Secondary English/History). He completed a Bachelor of Arts degree at the University of Newcastle (NSW) in 1978 before joining the Hunter Valley Theatre Company. Doyle continued to perform while teaching at Glendale High School near Newcastle. After seven years of teaching, he moved to Sydney, where he worked with the Sydney Theatre Company.

== Career ==
=== Radio ===
Doyle began his radio career in 1985 when his character "Rampaging" Roy Slaven appeared on Triple J's breakfast show every Friday. Loosely based on classic TV sporting commentators such as Rex Mossop, Doyle created Slaven as an opinionated, talented "sporting everyman" who has represented Australia in every field, won innumerable Melbourne Cups on his ageless mount Rooting King, is on intimate terms with every sporting celebrity (including many top racehorses), as well as film and music stars, politicians and other leaders of society around the world, yet who retains the "common touch" and stands for Australian manhood, fairness, and honesty. Slaven is the name of a well known family from Doyle's home town, Lithgow.

During that time, he met Flinders University arts graduate and comedian Greig Pickhaver when they worked together as minor characters on the SBS children's series Five Times Dizzy. Pickhaver had similar comedic skills and interests, and had also developed a sporting commentator character called HG Nelson while appearing on the Melbourne radio comedy program Punter to Punter in the early '80s. An amalgam of just about every Aussie sports commentator and race caller who ever lived, HG, like Roy, has seen and done it all and is utterly passionate about truth and honesty in sport.

The team of "Roy and HG" was born when This Sporting Life premiered on Triple J in early 1986. The four-hour (later three-hour) comedy show, improvised live, soon became a cult hit. Over that time Doyle and Pickhaver perfected a unique style that satirises the world of sport and the athletes, the entertainment scene and celebrity in general, in a manner that is simultaneously ruthless and affectionate. As well as their weekly radio show, the duo also made satirical radio "calls" of major annual sporting events including the State of Origin series, the NRL and AFL Grand Finals (known as the Festivals of the Boot, Parts I and II) and the Melbourne Cup, as well as occasional outside broadcasts of TSL performed before live audiences.

In addition to This Sporting Life, Doyle hosted the two-hour mid-afternoon shift on ABC radio station 2BL in Sydney for several years in the late 1980s and early 1990s, earning a loyal following among listeners and demonstrating that he was not only extremely knowledgeable on a huge range of subjects, but was also a superb interviewer. He took over many existing program segments and made them entirely his own, and his regular conversations with guests such as cooking expert Barbara Lowery, Sydney Opera House media liaison officer "Commodore" David Brown (whom he nicknamed "The Salty Sea Dog"), gardening expert Angus Stewart (nicknamed "The Doctor Of The Dirt"), pop music expert and "Sydney Morning Herald" journalist Bruce Elder (nicknamed "The Professor of Pop") and Sydney Morning Herald TV Guide editor Tony Squires, became regular highlights of the show.

Like Graham Kennedy, Doyle specialised in subtly (or blatantly) undercutting the "straight" presentation of such stock segments, and he often veered off on tangents that he found funny or diverting, or introduced ideas which he thought might be likely to get a "rise" from his guest. One memorable thread was his long-running obsession with the source of a supposed "mystery noise" that was reputedly disturbing patrons in the Opera House Concert Hall, and he regularly badgered long-suffering Opera House publicist David Brown for an explanation. The inadequacy of the women's toilets were also a frequent subject of discussion, or more correctly, interrogation, and the "what's on at the Opera House" segments stretched from around 10 minutes to a whole half-hour, through most of which David Brown's characteristic laugh was a highlight.

Although his "Slavenesque" sense of humour often showed through on the 2BL shift, Doyle and Pickhaver were assiduous about keeping their real-life identities and the Roy and HG characters separate (they were rarely photographed) and although Pickhaver often appeared on The Afternoon Programme as HG Nelson, Doyle never performed overtly as Roy, or referred to him in any way. During this period Doyle kept up a hectic work schedule, presenting The Afternoon Programme two hours a day, Monday to Friday, as well as his regular four-hour stint on Saturdays on This Sporting Life and also, at one stage, the first weekly half-hour TV version of the show.

This Sporting Life was added to the National Film and Sound Archive's Sounds of Australia registry in 2013.

In March 2020, Doyle and Pickhaver reprised their roles as Roy Slaven and HG Nelson for their weekly show Bludging on the Blindside.

=== Television ===
In 1984, Doyle appeared as English bowler George "Gubby" Allen in the acclaimed Network Ten television miniseries Bodyline.

In 1986, John appeared in some episodes of the incredibly popular Australian drama series "A Country Practice" - specifically episodes 39 and 40 titled "Duty Bound" in series 6, playing young father Neil Thomas, who struggling with relationship issues between his character and on-screen wife. https://www.imdb.com/title/tt1041929/

In the early 1990s, "Roy and HG" successfully transferred to ABC-TV; the first version, also called This Sporting Life, was moderately successful, but suffered from being essentially a TV "talking head" version of the radio show. They reinvented the concept by marrying it with a broad parody-cum-tribute of Australian variety entertainment. The result, Club Buggery ran for two series (one as The Channel Nine Show); it became a cult hit, and the duo won a Logie Award.

After moving to the commercial Seven Network in the late 1990s, they scored record TV ratings and gained international notoriety during the Sydney 2000 Olympics with their hit late-night Olympic commentary show The Dream. The show became so popular that the Australian Olympic Committee included the duo in the Closing Ceremony. They have also appeared on the Seven Network with The Monday Dump and The Nation Dumps and have repeated their success with The Dream in two subsequent series commentating on the 2002 Winter Olympics in Salt Lake City and the 2004 Olympics in Athens. The two have also appeared together on the television shows The Channel Nine Show and Planet Norwich.

Over the last decade Doyle has also developed a very successful parallel career as a writer of serious television drama. His first major effort as a TV dramatist was the highly acclaimed ABC-TV miniseries Changi, an adventurous exploration of the experiences of a group of young Australian soldiers interned in Changi POW camp during World War II. The series was partly inspired by Hogan's Heroes and was originally conceived as a situation comedy; using the dramatic technique of magic realism, Doyle developed the script into a deeply moving yet often humorous examination of the experiences of young men at war and the effects it has on their later lives.

In 2003, he completed the drama series Marking Time, which examines contemporary racial and cultural tensions in Australian society, seen through the prism of an Australian country town and focusing on the relationship between two teenagers — an Anglo Celtic Australian boy named Hal and an Afghan refugee Muslim girl named Randa.

In 2006, Doyle appeared in Two Men In A Tinnie, a documentary of his own making involving a trip down the Murray-Darling river system of Australia with his longtime friend, biologist Dr. Tim Flannery. The program focuses on the degradation of the once mighty rivers and gives many different insights as to the causes. John and Tim reprised their collaboration in 2008 with Two In The Top End where they explored northern Australia and subsequently in 2012 with Two On The Great Divide where they travelled along the 3500 km long Great Dividing Range, and in 2014 with Two Men in China.

In 2013, he released Building Australia, a miniseries exploring the architecture and history of houses in Australia.

=== Theatre ===
In 2008, his play Pig Iron People was produced by Sydney Theatre Company at the Sydney Opera House Drama Theatre. Another play written by John Doyle, Vere (Faith), produced by Sydney Theatre Company and the State Theatre Company of South Australia, was shown in October and November 2013.

== Personal life ==
Doyle met his wife Deanna, a visual artist, while working with the Hunter Valley Theatre Company, though they both graduated from the Newcastle Teachers' College in 1973. The couple lives in the Sydney suburb of Balmain.

Doyle is the Patron of Autism Spectrum Australia; with his affiliation brought about as a result of his younger sister Jen being diagnosed with autism when she was ten. Doyle's late father suffered from dementia, which inspired his play Vere (Faith). Both of Doyle's parents died in 2012 and his sister Jen died in early 2020.

== Honours ==
Doyle's outstanding contribution to Australia's cultural scene, through theatre, radio and television was recognised with the granting of an honorary Doctorate of Letters from the University of Newcastle in 2001. He delivered the 2005 Andrew Olle Media Lecture. He has also presented the AWGIE Awards a number of times, including in 2012 and 2015 as himself and in 2002 with Pickhaver as Rampaging Roy Slaven and HG Nelson.

Doyle became a Member of the Order of Australia on 14 June 2010 for service to the media as a presenter and entertainer, and as a supporter of a range of charitable organisations, particularly the United Nations Children's Fund in Australia.

Year	Nominated work	Category	Award	Result	Notes	Ref.
1981		City of Newcastle	Newcastle Drama Award	Won	Excellence in theatre	
1989	This Sporting Life	AWGIE Awards	Comedy - Any Medium	Won	With Greig Pickhaver	
1990	This Sporting Life	AWGIE Awards	Comedy - Any Medium	Won	With Greig Pickhaver	
1991	This Sporting Life	AWGIE Awards	Comedy - Any Medium	Won	With Greig Pickhaver	
1992	This Sporting Life	AWGIE Awards	Comedy - Any Medium	Won	With Greig Pickhaver	
1993	This Sporting Life	AWGIE Awards	Comedy	Won	With Greig Pickhaver	
1995	The World of An	AWGIE Awards	Comedy	Won		
1996	Club Buggery	AWGIE Awards	Comedy Revue/Sketch	Won		
1998	Club Buggery	Logie Awards	Most Outstanding Achievement in Comedy	Nominated	With Greig Pickhaver	
2001		AWGIE Awards	Fred Parsons Award	Won	With Greig Pickhaver	
2001	The Dream	Logie Awards	Most Outstanding Comedy Program	Nominated	With Greig Pickhaver	
2001	Changi	Australian Film Institute Awards	Best Screenplay in a Television Drama	Nominated		
2001	Changi	Australian Film Institute Awards	Best Telefeature of Miniseries	Nominated		
2002	Changi	Logie Awards	Most Outstanding Mini Series or Telemovie	Won		
2002	Changi episode Private Bill	AWGIE Awards	Miniseries (Original)	Won		
2002	Changi episode Seeing is Believing	AWGIE Awards	Miniseries (Original)	Nominated		
2004	Marking Time	Australian Film Institute Awards	Best Screenplay in Television	Won		
2004	Marking Time	Australian Film Institute Awards	Best Telefeature or Mini-Series	Won	With John Edwards	
2004	Marking Time	NSW Premier's Literary Awards	Betty Roland Prize for Scriptwriting	Won		
2004	Marking Time - episodes 1 & 2	AWGIE Awards	Television Award - Mini-Series (Original)	Won	Episodes 3 & 4 were also nominated	
2004	Marking Time	Logie Awards	Most Outstanding Mini Series or Telemovie	Nominated		
2004	The Cream	Logie Awards	Most Popular Sports Program	Nominated	With Greig Pickhaver	
2005	The Dream in Athens	Logie Awards	Most Popular Sports Program	Nominated	With Greig Pickhaver	
2006	Two Men in a Tinnie	SPAA Awards	Best Documentary	Won		
2009	Two in the Top End	Logie Awards	Most Outstanding Factual Program	Nominated		
2013	Vere (Faith)	Sydney Theatre Awards	Best New Australian Work	Nominated		

== Published works ==
- Nelson, H. G.; Slaven, Roy (1989). Pants off, this sporting life (paperback). Crows Nest, NSW: ABC Enterprises. p. 143. ISBN 0-642-12888-X.
- Slaven, Roy (1990). This is the south coast news and I'm Paul Murphy. Leak, Bill (illus). Crows Nest, NSW: ABC Enterprises. Archived from the original on 7 January 2016.
- Nankervis, Brian; Slaven, R.; Nelson, H. G. (1994). Boys and balls. St. Leonards, NSW: Allen & Unwin. p. 257. ISBN 1-86373-738-3.
- Nelson, H. G.; Slaven, Roy; Mombassa, Reg (1996). Petrol, bait, ammo & ice. Pan Macmillan. p. 220.
- Doyle, John (2001). Changi. Sydney: ABC Books. p. 289. ISBN 0-7333-1036-2.
- Doyle, John; Flannery, Tim (2006). "Two men in a tinnie: with John Doyle and Tim Flannery". [videorecording] : DVD. Film Finance Corporation Australia Limited and Cordell Jigsaw Productions Pty Ltd.
- Doyle, John (2008). The pig iron people. Strawberry Hills, NSW: Currency Press. p. 87. ISBN 978-0-86819-842-2.
- Doyle, John (2021). Blessed: The Breakout Year of Rampaging Roy Slaven. Sydney, NSW: Hachette. p. 304. ISBN 9780733647352.
