= Roy and HG's Russian Revolution =

2014 Australian sports comedy TV series

- Genre: sports/comedy talk show
- Presented by: Roy and HG
- Country of origin: Australia
- Original language: English
- No. of seasons: 1
- No. of episodes: 15

Production
- Production location: TEN Studios Melbourne
- Running time: 30 minutes

Original release
- Network: Network Ten; One
- Release: 8 February – 22 February 2014

Related
- The Ice Dream with Roy and HG

Roy and HG's Russian Revolution was a sports/comedy talk show, broadcast every night during the Sochi 2014 Olympics, presented by Australian comedy duo Roy and HG.

Targets of humour included Vladimir Putin, "useful" Russian phrases, New Zealand, the public toilets in the Olympic Park and Russian pop and folk music. Roy and HG also provided commentary for several events, parodying the pressure commentators put on athletes, with HG becoming upset when Australian athletes were beaten, and Roy being extremely critical of them for under-performing.
