= Fatso the Fat-Arsed Wombat =

Unofficial Olympic mascot

- The Dream with Roy and HG character
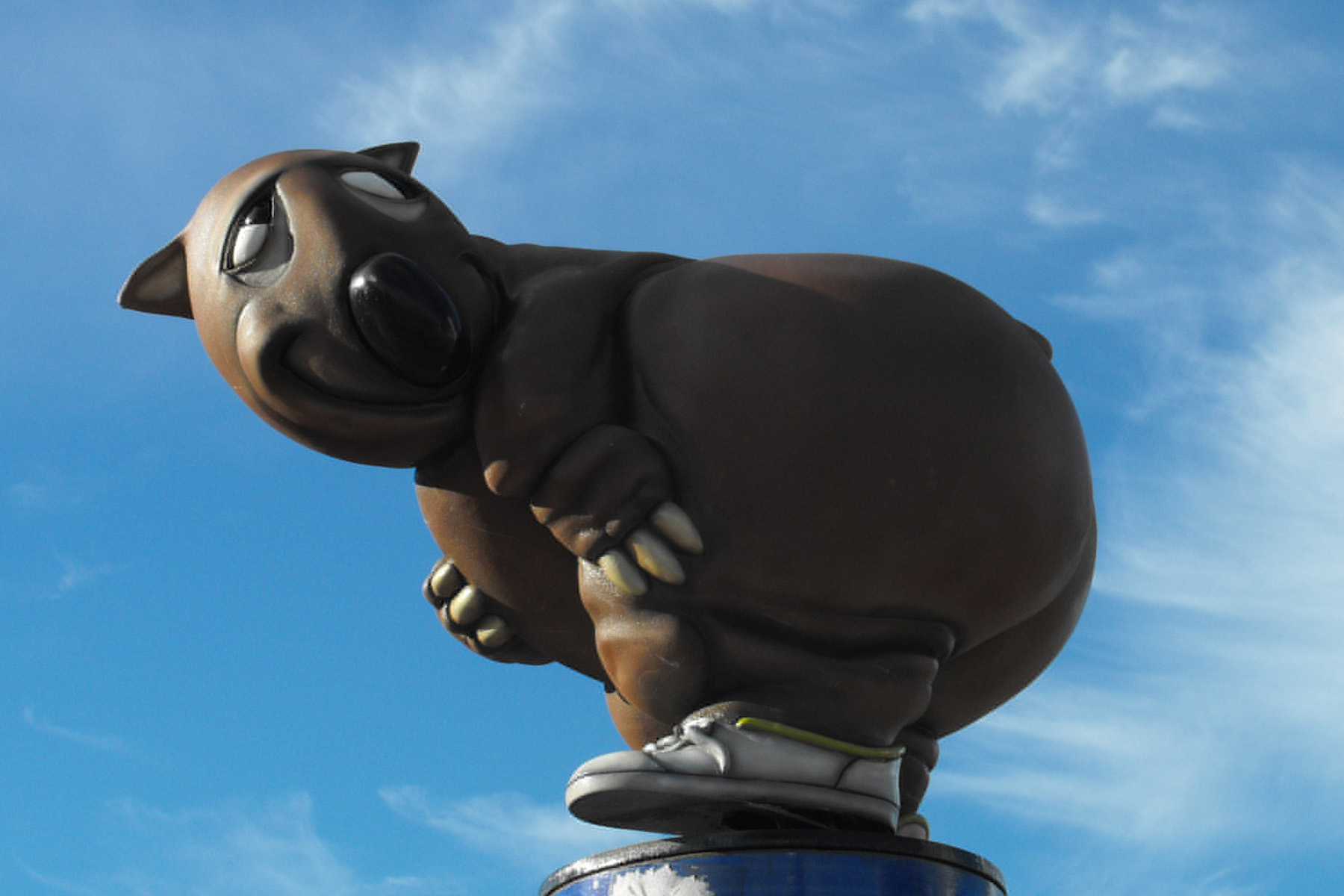
- Side view of "Fatso the Fat-Arsed Wombat" as he appeared on top of a pole outside Sydney's Stadium Australia
- First appearance: 2000
- Created by: Paul Newell; Roy and HG

In-universe information
- Species: Wombat
- Gender: Male
- Nationality: Australian

Fatso the Fat-Arsed Wombat was an unofficial mascot of the 2000 Summer Olympics created by Sydney cartoonist Paul Newell with Roy and HG from the Australian Channel Seven sports comedy television program The Dream with Roy and HG. Fatso is a wombat with a lazy, cheerful expression and comically pronounced rump. He usually appeared on The Dream broadcasts, sometimes as a life-size stuffed toy on Roy and HG's desk.

Fatso was a spoof of the official Olympic mascots Olly, Millie, and Syd, whom Roy & HG disparaged as "Syd, Ollie & Dickhead". He was nicknamed "the battlers' prince" and proved to be more popular among Australian fans of the duo (and some visitors who viewed the program) than the official mascots. Fatso appeared with gold medalists Susie O'Neill, Grant Hackett and the Australian men's 4×200-metre relay team on the winners' dais. He consequently appears on an official commemorative postage stamp of the Australian men's 4×200-metre relay team in the arms of Michael Klim. During the Olympics, the Australian Olympic Committee attempted to ban athletes appearing with Fatso to stop him upstaging their official mascots. The ensuing public relations disaster forced the president of the AOC, John Coates, and the director general of the IOC, Francois Carrard, to distance their organisations from these attempts.

In keeping with Fatso's role as a protest against the commercialisation of Olympic mascots, only two Fatso plushes were officially produced: one for use in the studio and the other for use in the athletes' village. At the end of the Olympics, one of the Fatso plushes was auctioned for the Olympic Aid charity, selling for A$80,450 to Seven Network executive chairman Kerry Stokes. It is currently housed in a glass box in Kerry Stokes' North Sydney office. A number of unofficial Fatso toys and memorabilia were sold by merchants without authorisation from the producers of The Dream.

A statue of Fatso appeared as part of an official Olympic memorial outside the Sydney Olympic Stadium, commemorating the volunteers who worked during the Olympics. The Fatso statue was vandalised in late September 2010, then stolen sometime before 8 October 2010. The stolen statue was replaced in 2020.

== See also ==
- List of Olympic mascots
- List of Australian sporting mascots
