= Sporting Life =

Sporting Life, The Sporting Life or Sportin' Life may refer to:

== Film ==
- Sporting Life (1918 film), a silent drama film directed by Maurice Tourneur
- Sporting Life (1925 film), a silent comedy-drama film directed by Maurice Tourneur
- Sportin' Life (2020 film), an Italian documentary film

== Music ==
- Sportin' Life (Mink DeVille album), issued in 1985, is the sixth and final album by the rock band Mink DeVille
- Sportin' Life (Weather Report album), the fifteenth studio album by Weather Report, released in 1985
- The Sporting Life (album), a 1994 album by avant-garde singer Diamanda Galas
- "The Sporting Life," a song on The Decemberists' album Picaresque
- Sporting Life (musician) (born 1983), member of New York City hip hop group Ratking

== Other uses ==
- Sportin' Life, a character in George Gershwin's opera Porgy and Bess
- Sporting Life (retailer), a sporting goods retailer based in Toronto, Ontario, Canada
- Sporting Life (British newspaper), a former British racing newspaper now operating as a website only
- Sporting Life (American newspaper), a defunct US newspaper

== See also ==
- This Sporting Life (disambiguation)
