= Smiggin Holes 2010 Winter Olympic bid =

2010 Olympic host bid

The Smiggin Holes 2010 Winter Olympic bid was a joke campaign initiated by Australian comedians Roy & HG to bring the 2010 Winter Olympics to the tiny and little-known village of Smiggin Holes, part of the Perisher Valley ski resort, in New South Wales, Australia. The bid was first proposed on the television show The Ice Dream, which aired as part of the Seven Network's coverage of the 2002 Winter Olympics in Salt Lake City.

== Overview ==
During the course of The Ice Dream's broadcast, a number of suggestions were presented by the hosts to the audience in order to make the holding of the Winter Games possible at Smiggin. For example, in order to provide a tall enough mountain for skiing events, Roy and HG proposed that either Mount Kosciuszko be raised 300 metres (from its current height of 2,228 metres), or that a new mountain be built in Smiggin itself, which would be named Mount Steggall, after Australian Nagano slalom bronze medalist Zali Steggall. "We've just got to get the nation to dump all its rubbish on top of Kosciuszko, compact it a bit and voila, Mount Steggall."

In addition, the duo suggested that the caravan park could be used as the athletes' village, and local portable toilet business Dougie Does Dunnies promised the cleanest Olympic Games ever as far as toilets were concerned. The Cooma KFC would provide catering for the event. The duo also suggested that the Biathlon would "have live targets, something that will make a noise when it's hit". Roy also said that "we can have a kangaroo cull. God we're going to have fun."

Mottos for the Smiggin Holes 2010 bid included "Unleash the Mighty Mongrel of the Holes", "Winter Wonder Down Under" and "If you've got the poles, we've got the holes." Appearing on The Ice Dream, International Olympic Committee president Jacques Rogge described the bid film as "very impressive".

== Smiggin Holes 2014 bid ==
After the disappointment of being pushed out by Vancouver for 2010, HG Nelson stated in a June 2009 podcast that "I think 2014 is not beyond us, and we're still marking it under the slogan, 'If you've got the poles, we've got the holes.'" Sochi has since hosted the 2014 Winter Games.
