= Communication (John Farnham song) =

Single by John Farnham and Danni'Elle
- Released: August 1989
- Recorded: 1989
- Studio: Metropolis Audio.
- Label: RCA Records
- Songwriters: Phil Beasley; Phil Rigger; Terry McArthur
- Producer: Ross Fraser

John Farnham singles chronology
"We're No Angels" (1989)	"Communication" (1989)	"Chain Reaction" (1990)

"Communication" is a song by Australian singer John Farnham and Danni'Elle. The song was recorded and released in 1989 and peaked at number 13 on the ARIA Charts. The single came with full colour poster and "Sex & Drugs & AIDS" booklet.

== Track listing ==
1. "Communication" by John Farnham & Danni'Elle
2. "Attitude" by Question Time

== Chart history ==
Chart (1989)	Peak position
Australia (ARIA)	13
