= Marking Time =

- Genre: Drama
- Created by: John Doyle
- Starring: Abe Forsythe; Bojana Novakovic; Geoff Morrell; Elena Carapetis
- Country of origin: Australia
- No. of episodes: 4

Production
- Producers: John Edwards; Jo Rooney
- Running time: 230 min
- Production company: Southern Star Group

Original release
- Network: ABC
- Release: 9 November 2003

Marking Time is an Australian television mini-series, consisting of four one-hour episodes. It first aired on 9 and 10 November 2003 on ABC-TV. Directed by Cherie Nowlan and written by John Doyle, it was the first mainstream television/film project to address the issue of the Government of Australia' refugee policy, a topic it approaches by chronicling the emotional journey of one young man during his year off after graduation, in his fictional rural home-town of Brackley, Australia.

The storyline of Marking Time was inspired by the real-life experiences of Afghan refugees and their hosts in the rural town of Young; however much of the outdoor scenes of the series were actually shot at Singleton.

== Plot ==
An Afghan father and his daughter, Randa (Bojana Novakovic), arrive in Australia to escape the Taliban. At school Randa is teased for her religion and wearing a hijab. The main character who finished secondary school the previous year, Hal (Abe Forsythe) begins to feel sorry for her and over a course falls in love with her. Although her father initially allows them to date, there is a lot of tension with their culture differences (Randa is a practising Muslim, Hal an atheist).

Soon after the September 11th attacks, Randa's father's house is destroyed by an intentionally lit fire. Hal's father (Morrell) offers them shelter in his house. Later that night, Randa, afraid, sneaks into Hal's room seeking comfort. The two sleep together and are later found in bed by her father. Upset by what has happened, he leaves and refuses to let Hal see Randa.

Hal and Randa continue to see each other in secret, Randa admitting she 'did not regret' what she did with Hal. Eventually their refugee status is rejected and they are ordered to return. Hal and his father try valiantly to think of a way to keep them there, but come up empty handed. Finally Hal, decides that he loves Randa and offers to run away from the law with her. He tells his plan to his father who initially disapproves, but after seeing how much they love each other, allows. He also tells Randa's father, who is initially reluctant. Hal promises to take care of her and her father agrees, realising that Randa will be deported with him unless she leaves. Randa is initially reluctant to leave her father, but ultimately agrees.

They leave on the night of Randa's deportation. Stopping off in a hotel room, they make love tenderly one last time. When Hal awakes, Randa is gone. She leaves him a note explaining she can not leave her father or get him or her father into trouble. He returns, but is too late as he sees Randa and her father on a bus for deportation.

Eventually he decides to go overseas to look for her. He uses the money his mother left to him to buy a plane ticket and the series ends with Hal unsure about what will happen in his search for his love.

== Cast ==
- Abe Forsythe - Hal Fleming
- Geoff Morrell - Geoff Fleming
- Elena Carapetis - Gemma
- Bojana Novakovic - Randa
- Matthew Le Nevez - Bullet Sheather
- Abbie Cornish - Tracey
- Katie Wall - Belinda

- Gyton Grantley - Shane Sheather
- Scott Swalwell - Jamie
- Lech Mackiewicz - Hassan
- Graeme Blundell - Ralph Dare
- Anthony Simcoe - Scott Seaton
- Brian Meegan - Ross Ferguson
- Matthew Lilley - Todd Paynter

- Barbara Morton - Marie Stockard
- Ian Bliss - Col Bryant
- Paul Pantano - Remus Migotso
- Thea Gumbert - Katey
- Arianthe Galani - Mrs. Spiro
- Sharin Contini - Constable Welch
- Dave Rondo - Cos

- Rhonda Doyle - Aunt Holly
- Ben Tate - Troy
- Adam Cahill - Troy's mate
- Sueyan Cox - Aunty Sarah
- Andrew Harris - Salesman
- Cecil Parkee - Billy Chan
- Shauna Jensen - Wedding Singer
- Megan Dickinson - Flower Girl
- Arianthe Galani as Mrs Spiro

Abe Forsythe and Bojana Novakovic already knew each other as they went to primary school together.

== Awards and nominations ==
=== Awards ===
Australian Film Institute Television Awards
Year	Category	Winner	Episode
2004	Best Actor in a Supporting or Guest Role in a Television Drama or Comedy	Matt Le Nevez	
2004	Best Actress in a Supporting or Guest Role in a Television Drama or Comedy	Katie Wall	

The miniseries won a record 7 AFI Awards in 2004.

=== Nominations ===
Australian Film Institute Television Awards
Year	Category	Winner	Episode
2004	Best Actress in a Supporting or Guest Role in a Television Drama or Comedy	Abbie Cornish	
