= Dannielle Gaha =

Australian singer

Dannielle DeAndrea
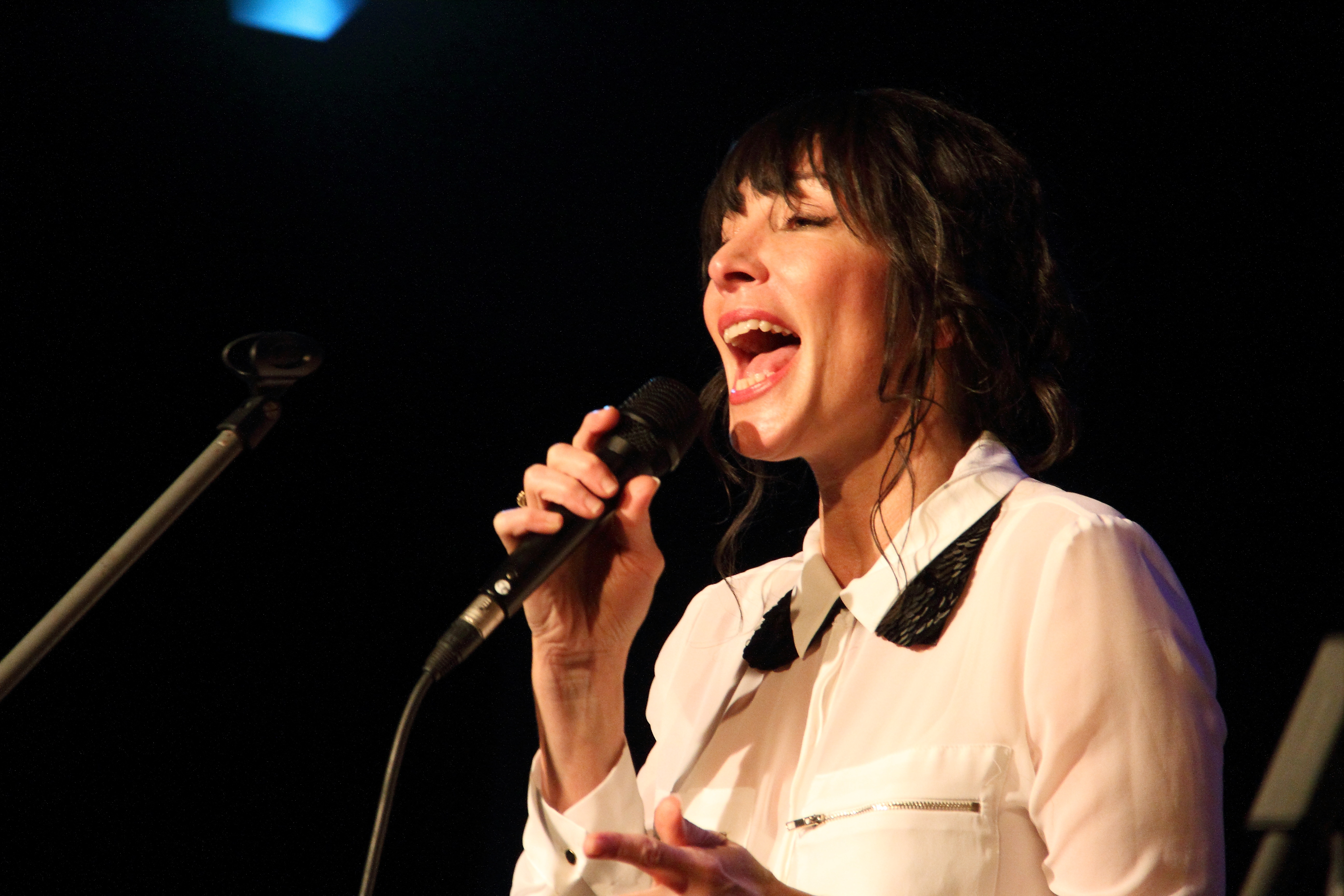
- Dannielle DeAndrea in KULT, Niederstetten 2017

Background information
- Also known as: Danni'elle, Sheets Afyre
- Born: Dannielle Gaha
- Genres: Pop, rock, soul, jazz
- Occupations: Singer, songwriter
- Instrument: Vocals
- Years active: 1986–present
- Labels: East West, Warner, Epic

Dannielle Gaha DeAndrea, sometimes styled as Danni'elle, is an Australian singer and songwriter. She has toured and recorded with fellow Australian John Farnham; their 1989 duet, "Communication", peaked at number 13 on the Australian Recording Industry Association (ARIA) Singles Chart. When based in London from 1992 to 1993, she released two solo singles, which have appeared in the UK Singles Chart, and she is the first Australian artist to appear on the UK soul chart.

As Sheets Afyre, she was part of singing duo The Nissan Cedrics, with Louise Anton, on ABC-TV comedy show Club Buggery from 1995, which was hosted by Roy and HG. The Nissan Cedrics released Going for a Song in 1997. Her debut solo album, You Don't Know Me, containing jazz covers, was issued in 2002. She is the sister of reality television producer Eden Gaha. In 2007, she married Kyle DeAndrea and they live in Los Angeles.

== Career ==
Gaha was a backing vocalist for Glenn Shorrock (ex-Little River Band) during his solo tours in the late 1980s and together they released a duet single, "One Million Minutes of Peace" for the International Year of Peace (1986). She first came to national prominence in August 1989 on a duet with John Farnham called "Communication", which reached number 13 on the ARIA Singles Chart. She toured with Jason Donovan as a backing vocalist in 1990 and on-stage she sang Kylie Minogue's part in the duet "Especially for You" with Donovan.

In 1991, Gaha released her debut solo single, "I Like It" which was followed with "Secret Love" in 1992; neither had chart success in Australia. Later that year, she signed to Epic Records and travelled to the UK. Her first UK single, "Stuck in the Middle" peaked in the top 75. The accompanying club remixes were by Roger Sanchez, E-Smoove and Maurice Joshua. Epic released "Do It for Love" in February 1993, which peaked just outside the UK top 50. Again, the track came with a batch of reputable club remixes from artists including Creative Thieves, Dave Seaman (of Brothers in Rhythm) and Phil Kelsey.

In June 1993, Gaha's remixed version of "Secret Love" was released, and it became a UK club hit and peaked at No. 41. There was an album recorded around this time, featuring the three aforesaid singles, but Epic chose not to release it.

Gaha was part of the singing duo The Nissan Cedrics, with Louise Anton (as Muff Merkin) on the ABC-TV comedy show, Club Buggery from 1995, which was hosted by Roy and HG. The Nissan Cedrics released "Going for a Song" in 1997.

In 1997, English house and garage producer Danny J Lewis sampled "Secret Love" in "Spend the Night", which was a UK top 30 hit.

Gaha toured Australia with Farnham in 2002–2003 on his The Last Time Tour. In 2002, her debut album You Don't Know Me was released. It comprised covers of jazz and blues standards by artists like Ella Fitzgerald and included "Moon River", "A-Tisket, A-Tasket" and "The Masquerade Is Over". You Don't Know Me was well received by critics and sold respectably in Australia but did not chart.

In early 2007, Gaha recorded an album with French composer Christophe Jacquelin, who found her on Myspace and flew her over for 2 weeks to record the album Lovers and Tears by Leaving the Ozone—a project with Gaha, Jacquelin and songwriter Claudia Phillips—with a French and Bulgarian orchestra. One of their songs was used for the closing credits on 3D IMAX movie Dolphins and Whales 3D: Tribes of the Ocean (2008).

Also in 2007, Gaha married Kyle DeAndrea; they live in Los Angeles, California. She released a CD, Chocolate for Holly, which includes a reworked version of "Do It for Love". Dannielle DeAndrea won a California State University, Northridge (CSUN) jazz competition in late 2007 and from that recorded her next original EP, Be with Me.

In 2008, DeAndrea joined up with Scooter Pietsch and Jessica New to record the dance/pop album Supabeat. Songs from this album have been used on television series including Degrassi High, The Bold and the Beautiful, MTV's Real World, The Greek and Burn Notice.

In March 2009, DeAndrea returned to Australia for the launch of Chocolate for Holly and Be with Me at The Vanguard; the performance was sold out. DeAndrea joined Farnham on his Back by Demand Tour in September–October 2009 throughout Australia. She also performed solo concerts of her own material and jazz standards into November.

In 2010, DeAndrea toured Europe and North America as part of Jackson Browne's band. She returned to Australia in October to join Farnham on his national tour. She also performed side shows to promote the release of her new single "Blue Skies".

In 2012, she performed backing vocals for Ariana Grande and combined with Erica Canales (backup singer for Brandon Flowers) and Gaby Moreno to form the vocal group The SongBirds. The SongBirds' 2012 EP was launched at the Sunset Marquis Hotel by Modern Family actress Sarah Hyland and Elle magazine. In 2014, The SongBirds toured Australia performing shows in Perth, Melbourne, Brisbane and finishing with a sold-out show at club 505 in Sydney. The SongBirds ended the year with two tracks featured on the nationwide Australian compilation The Spirit of Christmas 2014. In 2015, she recorded the track "High Dreams" together with David Batteau and Larry Goldings that won the UK Songwriting Competition.

== Discography ==
=== Albums ===
Title	Album details
You Don't Know Me	Released: 2002; Label: Danndelion (5106392000); Format: CD

=== Extended plays ===
Title	EP details
Love, Chocolate & All Other Christmas	Released: 18 December 2010; Label: Danni'elle Gaha DeAndrea; Format: Download

=== Singles ===
Title	Year	Peak chart positions		Album
Title	Year	AUS	UK	Album
"One Million Minutes of Peace" (with Glenn Shorrock)	1986	—	—	Non-album singles
"Communication" (with John Farnham)	1989	13	—	Non-album singles
"I Like It"	1991	—	—	Non-album singles
"Stuck in the Middle"	1992	—	68	Non-album singles
"Do It for Love"	1993	—	52	Non-album singles
"Secret Love"	1993	—	41	Non-album singles
"The Man with the Bag" (with The Rudolphs)	2003	—	—	Non-album singles
"Heaven" (with Ian Pooley and Jade MacRae)	2004	—	—	Souvenirs (Ian Pooley album)
