= Short Circuit (play) =

Short Circuit is a 1935 British comedy play by Alec Coppel. It was his first produced play.

== Premise ==
A fair of adulterous lovers have troubles.

== Original Cast ==
- Cecil Humphreys as Robert Winton
- Iris Baker as Julia Winter
- Anthony Ireland as Deryk Bryce
- Ernest Jay as Mr Simpson
- Pamela Carme as Constance Bryce
- Ian MacDonald as Mr Hopkins
- Frederick Annerley as Fraser
- John Kentish as Lloyd

== Reception ==
Reviewing the original 1935 production The Observer disliked the first act but enjoyed the second act.
