= This Sporting Life (Roy & HG album) =

Compilation album by Roy & HG
- Released: 19 August 2016
- Genre: Comedy
- Length: 128:49
- Label: ABC Music/ UMA
- Producer: Mark Kennedy

Roy & HG chronology
Roy & HG Present Allan Border: Cricket's First Saint (1995)	This Sporting Life (2016)

This Sporting Life is the fifth album by Australian comedy duo Roy & HG, featuring content from their radio show of the same name. The album was released in August 2016 and peaked at number 6 on the ARIA Charts.

At the ARIA Music Awards of 2016 it won Best Comedy Release.

== Background and release ==
From 1986 to 2008, Roy & HG hosted This Sporting Life on Triple J, a live, improvised satirical radio program on sport in Australia – among other things. It's the longest running show in the station's history. To celebrate 30 years since the show first aired, Roy & HG released a compilation album of some of the show's highlights from throughout the years.

== Reception ==
Chris Murray from Stack said "The only problem with this 30th anniversary collection of some of the 'gold' from the dynamic duo's unsurpassed satire and dissection of Australian sport and pop culture, is that you simply don't want the snippets to end. Unaware of them? Two highly intelligent raconteurs wax lyrical with endless ease on complete bullsh-t, based on loose facts around current events that will have you in stitches, while also remembering that very uncanny and uniquely Australian sense of humour which is lacking in today's mass media. From why Rampaging Roy Slaven's favourite horse never played rugby league, to the solution to finding new heavyweight (fat) boxers via travelling the country simply armed with binoculars, or indeed how Cher was once explicitly examined by Roy (at her request) to kill media speculation on cosmetic surgery – you are hooked." Murray concluded saying "Nothing will ever come close to their winning formula of smarts and silliness."

== Track listing ==
Disc One

1. "This Sporting Life Opener" - 2:09
2. "TSL Promo" - 0:21
3. "Grand Final Week Breakfasts" - 1:33
4. "Funny Meats for Kids" - 0:37
5. "Roy's Rectal Ring Balm" - 0:16
6. "Rooting King and the League" - 1:23
7. "Chicks Love Big Feet" - 0:43
8. "Istanga Art" - 1:12
9. "Sunday Night Lineup on ABC" - 3:37
10. "How Would You Like the Perfect Kiddie?" - 0:42
11. "Baghdad Brian" - 0:53
12. "Players' Media Duties" - 3:09
13. "Burn Your Pants!" - 0:33
14. "Roy's Signature Small Goods" - 0:30
15. "Istanga Yoga" - 0:23
16. "Why Roy Never Coached" - 1:43
17. "King Tide Sleepmaker I" - 0:36
18. "Webcke Park I" - 0:57
19. "Grand Final Walk" - 1:32
20. "The Don Bradman Invincibles Calendar" - 0:35
21. "NRL Gods are Cruel" - 1:31
22. "Broncos' and Cowboys' Fans in Sydney" - 0:53
23. "How Would You Like to Be Stout?" - 0:16
24. "Cher Goes Under the Microscope" - 5:26
25. "Frosty Lahood Motors - No Root, No Toot!" - 0:32
26. "Backless Sports Coat for Men" - 0:26
27. "People Bag the Shark I - PGA" - 1:51
28. "Rent-a-Star International - Golf Keynote Speakers" - 0:42
29. "People Bag the Shark II - Get to Know Him First" - 0:58
30. "Look Of Laura Knitwear Range"- 0:23
31. "Webcke Park 2 [Live with Your Storage]" - 0:23
32. "Golf Technology/2 Big Spaniards" - 3:32
33. "Aussie Fuzzy Fruits for Kids" - 0:47
34. "Frosty Lahood Motors - Frosty Junior" - 0:41
35. "Home and Away" - 5:14
36. "Jeffrey Smart's Smart Arses" - 0:54
37. "Shackleton's Hot Knob" - 0:34
38. "Burn Your House Down for Sydney 2000" - 1:23
39. "King Tide Sleepmaker II" - 0:26
40. "What Sports Might Roy Represent In?" - 01:36
41. "The Shooter's Radio Antenna" - 0:23
42. "No Ball, No Bull" - 0:50
43. "Graham Gooch's Finger" - 3:45
44. "Lazy Boy Crack Baffler: - 0:33
45. Royal House of Trouser" - 1:00
46. "Stumpy Boon Learns to Walk Again" - 2:39
47. "Adopt a Cock!" - 0:37
48. "Roy's World of Rockets" - 1:17
49. "Hunt for a Heavy" - 2:10
50. "Love Fountain" - 0:28
51. "Baggy Green Bum Ring Kit" - 0:50
52. "Jeff Fenech Gives Back" - 2:35
53. "Farts of the Famous" - 0:56
54. "Anzac Day Weekend" - 0:45

Disc Two

1. "There are Collectors, and Collectors" - 0:47
2. "The Ruddock Toilet Fish" - 1:01
3. "Cultures of Sex or Violence in AFL" - 2:07
4. "Frosty Lahood Fundraiser for Tsunami" - 0:27
5. "Mad Dads" - 0:28
6. "Tanking in Tennis" - 4:46
7. "Date Ace" - 0:44
8. "Prime Minister's Fund for Cricketers"- 1:00
9. "Roy & HG Deal With the Palace" - 3:14
10. "The South Coast News" - 6:34
11. "Toilet Police Go to London" - 0:39
12. "Doctor Spoof in Brighton" - 0:28
13. "Rabbits Re-Enact First Game of League" - 3:12
14. "Agents to the Stars" - 0:20
15. "Eau De Cliff" - 0:37
16. "The John Eales Medal Night" - 2:53
17. "Pole up Australia" - 0:23
18. "The Bitemeister" - 1:10
19. "Junior Sport" - 3:00
20. "Frosty Lahood [Junior's Videos]" - 1:10
21. "AJ Gel" - 0:46
22. "Cinderella Stadium" - 3:25
23. "Fuzzy Fruit Challenge"- 0:34
24. "Terminal Tuesday at City Morgue" - 0:21
25. "Grandstands at the Speedway" - 3:51
26. "Jockaroos" - 0:20
27. "Chunky Gold Chains" - 0:26
28. "Robbie Maddison's Leap" - 5:39
29. "Frosty Lahood for Aussie Fuzzy Fruit"- 0:40
30. "Jim Waley" - 0:36
31. "The Wedding of the Year" - 1:38
32. "New Age of This Sporting Life" - 0:21
33. "Ronnie Quinton's Last Ride" - 1:30
34. "Toilet Police Go to Sydney" - 1:03
35. The Andy Caddick Tapes" - 1:07
36. "Don Bradman's Cap" - 0:52

== Charts ==
Chart (2016)	Peak position
Australian Albums (ARIA)	6

== Release history ==
Region	Date	Format	Label	Catalogue
Australia	19 August 2016	2x CD; digital download	ABC Music / Universal Music Australia	4743881
