= The Ice Dream with Roy and HG =

2002 Australian sports comedy TV series

- Also known as: The Ice Dream
- Presented by: Roy and HG
- Country of origin: Australia
- Original language: English
- No. of seasons: 1
- No. of episodes: 15

Production
- Running time: 60 minutes

Original release
- Network: Seven Network
- Release: 10 February – 24 February 2002

Related
- The Dream with Roy and HG

The Ice Dream with Roy and HG was a sports/comedy talk show, broadcast every night during 2002 Winter Olympics, presented by Australian comedy duo Roy and HG.

Targets of humour during the coverage of the 2002 Winter Olympics included figure skating, curling, Monaco's bobsleigh team (especially Albert II, Prince of Monaco). They promoted the Smiggin Holes 2010 Winter Olympic bid, even presenting it to IOC president Jacques Rogge, who described it as "very impressive". According to The Ice Dream, during the 1952 Olympics, Cedric Sloane skewered a seagull during a cross-country skiing event, putting a curse on the Australian team that could only be lifted when Australia won a gold medal (achieved by Steven Bradbury).

== See also ==
- Australia at the Olympics
