= Macquarie Sports Radio =

Australian radio network (2018–2020)

- Type: Sports radio
- Country: Australia
- Broadcast area: Australia
- Headquarters: Pyrmont, Sydney

Programming
- Language(s): English

Ownership
- Owner: Macquarie Radio Network

History
- Launch date: 4 April 2018
- Replaced: Talking Lifestyle
- Closed: 1 February 2020
- Replaced by: 2UE, 4BH, 6GT, Magic 1278

Coverage
- Stations: Northern stations: AM: 954 kHz Sydney; AM: 882 kHz Brisbane; DAB+: 9A Sydney; DAB+: 9B Brisbane; Southern stations: AM: 1278 kHz Melbourne; DAB+: 9B Melbourne; DAB+: 9B Perth

Macquarie Sports Radio was a short-lived Australian commercial radio network broadcasting to Sydney, Melbourne, Brisbane and Perth. Owned and operated by Macquarie Media, the network launched on 4 April 2018, replacing Talking Lifestyle. Following the acquisition of Macquarie Media by Nine Entertainment, programs outside of live sports commentary were suspended in October 2019, and on 1 February 2020 the network ultimately ceased broadcasting.

== History ==
On 2 March 2018, Radioinfo reported that Talking Lifestyle would cease broadcasting on 30 March, and be replaced by a sports radio format. Macquarie Sports Radio launched on 4 April 2018, with live coverage of the 2018 Commonwealth Games. Reflecting the geographical difference in the popularity of Australian sporting codes, the network broadcast two separate breakfast programs—hosted by John Stanley and Beau Ryan in Sydney and Brisbane, and Tony Leonard, Tony Shaw and Jimmy Bartel in Melbourne and Perth. Other presenters at launch included David Morrow, Tiffany Cherry, Mieke Buchan, Shane McInnes, Sam Stove, David Schwarz and Mark Allen.

The network retained Macquarie Radio's test cricket, Big Bash League and One Day International rights. Coverage of the Australian Football League (AFL) was broadcast into the northern markets—all games featuring Sydney Swans and Greater Western Sydney Giants were broadcast in Sydney, and all games featuring Brisbane Lions and Gold Coast Suns were broadcast in Brisbane. In Melbourne, the network broadcast National Rugby League (NRL) matches featuring the Melbourne Storm.

The network's initial ratings performance was poor. In Sydney, the final GfK ratings survey for Talking Lifestyle recorded the breakfast show as reaching 4.4% of all listeners. By the second survey of Macquarie Sports Radio, this figure had fallen to 0.7%. In July, Beau Ryan had departed the Sydney and Brisbane breakfast show, replaced by Mark Riddell.

In January 2019, significant programming changes were announced. The two breakfast shows would be merged into one, presented by Riddell and Mark Levy. On weekends, additional AFL and NRL coverage would be added, sourced from sister stations 3AW, 6PR and 2GB. In August, Macquarie Sports Radio was named the exclusive Australian radio broadcast partner of the English Premier League, syndicating live commentary from Talksport.

=== Closure ===
Despite the changes, the network continued to rate poorly. On 29 October, Macquarie Media announced that its sports talk shows would cease production from 1 November 2019. However, the station remained on the air and continued to broadcast live cricket and the Premier League, and on 4 November Macquarie Media announced it would reinstate Schwarz and Allen's drive program.

Following Nine Entertainment's acquisition of Macquarie Media, in January 2020 it was confirmed the network would cease broadcasting, with each station to revert to its pre–2016 branding. On 2 February 2020, the stations were re-launched as 2UE, 4BH and Magic 1278 with a classic hits music format.

== Sports coverage ==
Macquarie Sports Radio had exclusive and non-exclusive rights to various sports in Australia, although coverage varied by market:

Australian rules football

- Australian Football League (Sydney & Brisbane only)

Cricket

- Australian cricket team in the United Arab Emirates in 2018–19
- Big Bash League
- ICC Women's T20 World Cup
- Indian cricket team in Australia in 2018–19

Football

- A-League
- Premier League

Horse racing

- Melbourne Cup

Rugby league

- National Rugby League (Melbourne & Perth only)

== Transmitters ==
Macquarie Sports Radio was broadcast via three full-power AM stations.

Call sign	Frequency	Broadcast area	Power W	Transmitter coordinates	Notes
2UE	954 AM	Sydney, New South Wales	5,000	33°49′56″S 151°4′16″E	Locally branded as Macquarie Sports Radio 954
3EE	1278 AM	Melbourne, Victoria	5,000	37°44′42″S 145°6′38″E	Locally branded as Macquarie Sports Radio 1278
4BH	882 AM	Brisbane, Queensland	5,000	27°27′49″S 153°8′47″E	Locally branded as Macquarie Sports Radio 882

Each station was simulcast on DAB+ digital radio in their respective markets. Melbourne programming was also heard on digital radio in Perth.
