= Logie Awards of 1998 =

40th Logie Awards
- Date: 19 April 1998
- Site: Crown Palladium, Melbourne, Victoria
- Hosted by: Daryl Somers

Highlights
- Gold Logie: Lisa McCune
- Hall of Fame: Graham Kennedy
- Most awards: Blue Heelers (4)

Television coverage
- Network: Nine Network

The 40th Annual TV Week Logie Awards was held on Sunday 19 April 1998 at the Crown Palladium in Melbourne, and broadcast on the Nine Network. The ceremony was hosted by Daryl Somers, and guests included Matt LeBlanc, Kathy Najimy, Kenny Rogers and Reba McEntire.

== Winners and nominees ==
In the tables below, winners are listed first and highlighted in bold.

=== Gold Logie ===
Most Popular Personality on Australian Television
- **Lisa McCune in Blue Heelers (Seven Network)**
  - Kerri-Anne Kennerley in Midday With Kerri-Anne (Nine Network)
  - Ray Martin in A Current Affair (Nine Network)
  - Daryl Somers in Hey Hey It's Saturday (Nine Network)
  - John Wood in Blue Heelers (Seven Network)

=== Acting ===
Most Popular Actor	Most Popular Actress
**Martin Sacks in Blue Heelers (Seven Network)**; Colin Friels in Water Rats (Nine Network); Jesse Spencer in Neighbours (Network Ten); Nic Testoni in Home and Away (Seven Network); John Wood in Blue Heelers (Seven Network)	**Lisa McCune in Blue Heelers (Seven Network)**; Belinda Emmett in Home and Away (Seven Network); Rebecca Gibney in Halifax f.p. (Nine Network); Catherine McClements in Water Rats (Nine Network); Kristy Wright in Home and Away (Seven Network)
Most Outstanding Actor in a Series	Most Outstanding Actress in a Series
**Tony Martin in Wildside (ABC TV)**; Colin Friels in Water Rats (Nine Network); William McInnes in Blue Heelers (Seven Network); Rob Sitch in Frontline (ABC TV)	**Catherine McClements in Water Rats (Nine Network)**; Rachael Blake in Wildside (ABC TV); Rebecca Gibney in Halifax f.p. (Nine Network) and Kangaroo Palace (Seven Network); Alison Whyte in Good Guys, Bad Guys (Nine Network)
Most Popular New Talent
**Brooke Satchwell in Neighbours (Network Ten)**; Bree Desborough for Home and Away (Seven Network); Daniel Kowalski for Plucka's Place (Nine Network); Callan Mulvey for Heartbreak High (ABC TV)

=== Most Popular Programs ===
Most Popular Series	Most Popular Light Entertainment Program
**Blue Heelers (Seven Network)**; Home and Away (Seven Network); Neighbours (Network Ten); Water Rats (Nine Network)	**Hey Hey It's Saturday (Nine Network)**; In Melbourne Tonight (Nine Network); Midday With Kerri-Anne (Nine Network); Who Dares Wins (Seven Network)
Most Popular Comedy Program	Most Popular Lifestyle Program
**Full Frontal (Seven Network)**; Bullpitt! (Seven Network); Club Buggery (ABC TV); Frontline (ABC TV)	**Better Homes and Gardens (Seven Network)**; Burke's Backyard (Nine Network); Getaway (Nine Network); Our House (Nine Network)
Most Popular Sports Program	Most Popular Sports Event
**The Footy Show (AFL) (Nine Network)**; The Footy Show (ARL) (Nine Network); Sports Tonight (Network Ten); Wide World of Sports (Nine Network)	**AFL Grand Final (Seven Network)**; Bathurst 1000 (Network Ten); Grand Final ARL (Nine Network); Tennis Australian Open (Seven Network)
Most Popular Public Affairs Program
**A Current Affair (Nine Network)**; 60 Minutes (Nine Network); Today Tonight (Seven Network); Today (Nine Network)

=== Most Outstanding Programs ===
Most Outstanding Series	Most Outstanding Mini-series or Movie Made for Television
**Frontline (ABC TV)**; Good Guys, Bad Guys (Nine Network); Water Rats (Nine Network)	**Wildside (ABC TV)**; Halifax f.p. (Nine Network); Simone De Beauvoir's Babies (ABC TV)
Most Outstanding Achievement in Comedy	Most Outstanding Achievement in Sports
**Frontline (ABC TV)**; Club Buggery (ABC TV); McFeast: Pussy Power (ABC TV)	**Australia vs Iran World Cup Qualifier (SBS TV)**; Bathurst 1000 (Network Ten); AFL Grand Final (Seven Network)
Most Outstanding Achievement in News	Most Outstanding Achievement in Public Affairs
**"Thredbo Tragedy", Seven Nightly News (Seven Network)**; "Travel Rorts"; "Thredbo Tragedy"	**"Where Does The Buck Stop?", Four Corners (ABC TV)**; "Showdown in Emerald", Sunday (Nine Network); "Valentine's Day", Australian Story (ABC TV)
Most Outstanding Achievement in Children's Television	Most Outstanding Documentary
**Play School (ABC TV)**	**Rats in the Ranks (ABC TV)**; The Big House (ABC TV); The Call of Kakadu (ABC TV); Mabo: Life of An Island Man (ABC TV); Tell My Kids I'm Sorry (Seven Network)

== Hall of Fame ==
After a lifetime in Australian television, Graham Kennedy became the 15th inductee into the TV Week Logies Hall of Fame. However, Bert Newton accepted the award on his behalf.
