= Roy and HG =

Australian comedy duo

- Notable work: This Sporting Life; State of Origin commentaries; The Dream; The Ice Dream; Club Buggery; Russian Revolution; Bludging on the Blindside

Comedy career
- Years active: 1986–present
- Medium: Radio, television, books
- Genres: Satire, improvisational, deadpan
- Subjects: Sport (mainly rugby league), Australian culture, Australian politics
- Members: John Doyle; Greig Pickhaver
- Website: ABC webpage

Roy and HG are an Australian comedy duo, comprising John Doyle in the role of 'Rampaging' Roy Slaven and Greig Pickhaver as HG Nelson. Their act is an affectionate but irreverent parody of Australia's obsession with sport. The characters are based on stereotypes in sports journalism: Nelson the excitable announcer, and Slaven the retired sportsman turned expert commentator. In his 1996 book Petrol, Bait, Ammo & Ice, Pickhaver summarised the duo's comedic style as "making the serious trivial and the trivial serious".

The duo hosted This Sporting Life on the national youth station Triple J from 1986 to 2008, becoming one of the longest running radio shows in Australian history. It was added to the National Film and Sound Archive's Sounds of Australia registry in 2013, and a compilation released in 2016 won the ARIA Award for Best Comedy Release. After stints in commercial radio, they returned to the ABC in 2020 for their show Bludging on the Blindside, which continues weekly.

Roy and HG also had successful television projects, most notably their sports talk show The Dream, which formed part of Seven Network's coverage of the 2000 and 2004 Summer Olympics, and The Ice Dream during the 2002 Winter Olympics. Other programs include Club Buggery, which ran from 1995 to 1997 on the ABC, and Russian Revolution, which ran alongside the 2014 Winter Olympics.

== Radio ==
=== Triple J ===
Doyle and Pickhaver hosted the live, improvised, and satirical radio program This Sporting Life (TSL) on Australia's national youth station Triple J from 1986 to 2008. They also broadcast annual live commentaries of the NRL and AFL Grand Finals (dubbed the Festival of the Boot) and the Melbourne Cup. Commentaries for all three matches of rugby league's annual State of Origin series were also broadcast, and they have also broadcast live commentaries of other major events, including the Bicentennial celebrations on 26 January 1988 and the 2007 Australian federal election (Indecision 07). They also provided a half-hour coverage of the 2008 Beijing Olympics every weekday as the Golden Ring Show.

At conclusion, This Sporting Life held the record for the longest running program in the history of Triple J. The show was added to the National Film and Sound Archive's Sounds of Australia registry in 2013, and a 30th anniversary compilation released in 2016 won the ARIA Award for Best Comedy Release.

=== Triple M ===
Starting 12 January 2009, the duo presented the drive-time program The Life on the Triple M network, on Mondays and Fridays. In 2011, The Life show was cut to Fridays only, with the last episode broadcast on 25 November 2011. Roy and HG's Mardi Gras of Medals – their coverage of the Rio Olympic Games – was broadcast on Triple M in August 2016.

A weekly program, The Sporting Probe, commenced broadcast in January 2017 and ran for two years until December 2018. The show aired from 10:00 am to midday on Saturday in 2017, and in the same timeslot on Sunday in 2018. All episodes are available as a podcast.

=== Macquarie Sports Radio ===
In 2019, Roy and HG presented Just Short of a Length on the Macquarie Sports Radio network.

=== ABC Radio ===
Between 2012 and 2016, Roy and HG resumed their Festival of the Boot AFL and NRL grand final commentaries on ABC Radio.

In March 2020, Roy and HG returned to ABC Sport to present a new weekly Saturday afternoon show entitled Bludging on the Blindside. The show is broadcast on ABC Sport digital radio and the ABC Listen app, and broadcast on ABC Local Radio in NSW, ACT and QLD. All episodes are available on podcast platforms and the ABC Listen app soon after initial broadcast.

During the 2020 Summer Olympics, Roy and HG presented a daily Olympic games podcast for ABC Radio, entitled Dodging Armageddon. Similarly for the 2024 Summer Olympics, Roy and HG presented a show titled People, Medals and Cheese.

== Television ==
=== ABC ===
After several years on radio, Roy and HG transferred the radio show's format to a series of ABC television shows, including Blah Blah Blah (1988) (where they were only seen in silhouette), This Sporting Life (1993–94), the Logie award-winning Club Buggery (1995–97) and its successor The Channel Nine Show (1998), Planet Norwich (1998; made in the UK) and The Memphis Trousers Half Hour (2005; taped in Sydney but performed as if broadcast from the United States).

=== BBC ===
Roy and HG were recurring guests on the 1998 BBC One TV comedy series The Ben Elton Show.

=== Seven Network ===
After transferring to the commercial Seven Network in the late 1990s, they presented Win Roy & HG's Money (2000), an unsuccessful adaptation of the US hit Win Ben Stein's Money. They later succeeded with higher-rating shows The Monday Dump and The Nation Dumps.

Their biggest hit was their top-rating commentary-interview television program The Dream with Roy and HG (from the Sydney 2000 Olympics), featuring their own special outlook on the event. The Dream was followed by three spinoffs – The Ice Dream (from the 2002 Salt Lake City Winter Olympics), The Cream (from the 2003 Rugby World Cup), and The Dream again for the Athens 2004 Olympics. During the Ice Dream they launched a bid for the Winter Olympics to be held at Smiggin Holes, in the humorous Smiggin Holes 2010 Winter Olympic bid with suggested slogans "Unleash the Mighty Mongrel", "Winter Wonder Down Under" and "If you've got the poles, we've got the holes." Dream-style coverage of the 2006 FIFA World Cup, called the Dribble mit HG und Roy, was streamed via the Internet.

Roy and HG's sport shows were filmed in front of a live studio audience, segments including discussion between the two characters, interview with athletic guests and pre-recorded sports commentary. The humour of the duo's sports commentary came from their mock-serious tone which belied the innuendo and invented terminology that they used to describe the on-screen action. The pair would state fictitious "facts" about the competitors' occupations, histories and personalities. Roy & HG would also describe fictitious aspects of the competition venues, such as the so-called "Gobbler's Gulch" section of the Salt Lake City luge track.

Roy and HG were not selected by Channel Seven to cover the Beijing Olympics because of security concerns and the belief by Channel Seven management that the style of their coverage – going to air live following a day's events – would not have suited Australian audiences given Australia's time zones. Instead, a daily radio programme, The Golden Ring Show, was broadcast on Triple J, with Roy styled as "Crouching Tiger" and HG as "the Hidden Dragon".

=== Network 10 ===
Roy and HG joined Network 10 for their Sochi 2014 Winter Olympics coverage, where they hosted a commentary show called Roy and HG's Russian Revolution. HG Nelson also joined Stephen Quartermain and Alisa Camplin for the Sochi Tonight daily show.

== Awards and nominations ==
Year & Ceremony	For	Award	Result
1990 ARIA Awards	Rampaging Roy... The Life and Times of Roy Slaven	Best Comedy Release	Nominated
1991 ARIA Awards	Wicket to Wicket	Best Comedy Release	Nominated
1997 Logie Awards	Club Buggery	Most Outstanding Achievement in Comedy	Won
1997 Logie Awards	Club Buggery	Most Popular Comedy Program	Nominated
1998 Logie Awards	Club Buggery	Most Outstanding Achievement in Comedy	Nominated
2001 Logie Awards	The Dream with Roy and HG	Most Popular Sports Program	Won
2001 Logie Awards	The Dream with Roy and HG	Most Outstanding Comedy Program	Nominated
2002 Logie Awards	The Monday Dump	Most Popular Sports Program	Nominated
2002 Logie Awards	The Monday Dump	Most Outstanding Comedy Program	Nominated
2003 Australian Comedy Awards	17 years of radio & television work	Outstanding Performers	Won
2003 Australian Comedy Awards	17 years of radio work	Outstanding Networked Radio Comedy Performance	Won
2003 Logie Awards	The Ice Dream	Most Outstanding Comedy Program	Nominated
2003 Logie Awards	The Monday Dump	Most Popular Sports Program	Nominated
2004 Logie Awards	The Cream with Roy and HG	Most Popular Sports Program	Nominated
2005 Logie Awards	The Dream in Athens	Most Popular Sports Program	Nominated
2016 ARIA Awards	This Sporting Life	Best Comedy Release	Won

== Published works ==
=== Books ===
- 1989: Pants Off: This Sporting Life, by Roy Slaven and HG Nelson
- 1996: Petrol, Bait, Ammo & Ice by HG Nelson, with a foreword by Roy Slaven; illustrated by Reg Mombassa

=== DVDs ===
- 2000: The Dream with Roy and HG: The Sydney 2000 Olympic Games, (DVD)

=== Albums ===
Name	Album details	Peak chart positions
Name	Album details	AUS
Roy – The Life and Times of Rampaging Roy Slaven	Released: 1989; Label: ABC Records (ISBN 0-642-12950-9); Format: Cassette	—
Wicket To Wicket	Released: 1991; Label: ABC Records (ISBN 0-642-12919-3); Format: Cassette	—
Pound for Pound with Roy and HG	Released: 1993; Label: ABC Records (ISBN 0-642-17721-X); Format: Cassette	—
Tool Talk and Wise Cracks with Roy and HG	Released: 1993; Label: ABC Records (ISBN 0-642-17785-6); Format: Cassette	—
Roy & HG Present Allan Border: Cricket's First Saint	Released: 1995; Label: ABC Records (ISBN 0-642-17819-4); Format: CD	—
This Sporting Life	Released: August 2016; Label: ABC/ Universal Music (4743881); Format: CD, Digital download	6

== Influence on artists ==
In 2001 a portrait of Roy & HG by visual artist Paul Newton won the Packing Room Prize and the People's Choice award at the Archibald Prize.
