= This Sporting Life (radio program) =

Australian radio program

- Genre: Sports journalism, improvisational comedy
- Running time: 3 hours (Sundays 2pm–5pm)
- Country of origin: Australia
- Home station: Triple J
- TV adaptations: This Sporting Life (1993–1994)
- Hosted by: Roy and HG
- Created by: John Doyle; Greig Pickhaver
- Original release: 1986–2008

This Sporting Life was a satirical sports show on the Australian youth radio station Triple J, which ran from 1986 to 2008. It was created and hosted by comedians John Doyle and Greig Pickhaver as their characters Roy and HG — 'Rampaging' Roy Slaven, the retired sportsman turned commentator, and HG Nelson, the show's announcer.

Broadcast for 22 years, This Sporting Life remains the longest-running show in Triple J history, and garnered a dedicated national audience throughout its run. From 1993 to 1994, the show was adapted to television on ABC TV.

This Sporting Life was added to the National Film and Sound Archive's Sounds of Australia registry in 2013. A 30th anniversary compilation album of the show released in 2016 won the ARIA Award for Best Comedy Release in 2016.

== Format ==
This Sporting Life was a parody of sporting panel shows, although the duo cast a wide comedic net that encompassed entertainment, politics, celebrity and contemporary Australian culture in general. It was modelled to some extent on the popular 1980s Melbourne radio sport comedy panel show Punter to Punter, which also featured Greig Pickhaver (who plays HG Nelson) as a panel member and which was primarily concerned with the world of horse and greyhound racing.

This Sporting Life was substantially improvised. Doyle and Pickhaver would meet on the morning of the broadcast to discuss the week's events and agree on a general list of topics, but almost all of their discussions were made up live.

== History ==
=== Early years ===
Doyle and Pickhaver launched their Roy and HG persona on Australian public service youth radio station Triple J. They originally presented sporting editorials on the Breakfast show once a week.

After they commentated the 1986 NRL Grand Final live on Triple J, they were offered their own program, titled This Sporting Life. It was originally broadcast for four hours on Saturday afternoons, before being shuffled to three hours on Sundays.

Although the show was not an instant hit—some Triple J listeners at first mistook it for a real sport show—it soon found a loyal audience in Sydney, and this grew into a substantial nationwide following in the 1990s as Triple J expanded to become a national network.

=== Departure from Triple J ===
On 3 December 2008, Triple J announced that Roy and HG would be leaving the ABC after 22 years on air, and This Sporting Life would be discontinued. Doyle reflected on when he knew it was the right time to depart:

"Look, it was just getting a little bit silly ... Here we were on the youth network and I look at this grey-haired fellow shaving of a morning and think, maybe not."

In a press statement, Triple J manager Linda Bracken said: "They are more than a radio programme, they have become their own radio comedy genre. It's been a joy and a privilege to work with them."

Roy and HG began broadcasting on Triple M on 12 January 2009 with a show called The Life, presented during drive time at 4pm to 7pm every Monday and Friday nationally, excluding Adelaide.

== Segments ==
=== Sketches and guests ===
External audio
- The Nelson Report, Excerpt from a 1990 edition of The Nelson Report in which he discusses the Melbourne Cup

Aside from their improvised commentary, over the years, This Sporting Life included numerous scripted, pre-recorded segments, such as the topical satire commentaries "The Nelson Report" and "Date's Up, With Roy Slaven".

There was also a series of regular live feature segments; one of the earliest of these was "Tips from the Other Side", in which Nelson would list predictions for forthcoming sporting fixtures which had been provided by contacting the spirits of deceased celebrities. According to Nelson, many of these tips were provided thanks to the spirit of the late British "psychic" Doris Stokes, who acted as an intermediary. During one of these segments it was revealed that the spirits of the Russian Royal Family were avid fans of rugby league. For several years in the late 1980s the show also featured a weekly satirical roundup of entertainment at local Sydney clubs.

Guests appeared on the program in the early days, such as comedian Angela Webber in the guise of "punk granny" Lillian Pascoe, but guest appearances were gradually eliminated as the years passed. However the duo maintained an enduring relationship with actor Robbie McGregor who, in the guise of "King Wally Otto in the Soundproof Booth", provided the introduction, links and a wide variety of parodic fake advertisements. Australian Big Brother host Gretel Killeen and actor-comedian Jonathan Biggins have also provided voice-overs for many fake ads, including the ongoing series of fictitious products and services provided by Nelson-Slaven Industries.

In the last few years of the series comedian Chris Taylor from the Chaser filled in for John Doyle, broadcasting alongside Nelson on the occasions when Doyle was absent due to "other media commitments".

Aside from the regular improvised discussions and fake ads, one of the show's most enduring features was the listener giveaway segment, "The Fat", two of which occurred per show ("the first Fat of the afternoon", typically open to women only, and "the second Fat of the afternoon", open to all comers). In these competitions, listeners were asked to phone in with the answer to a question sourced from one of that afternoon's wide-ranging and often fantastical discussions of sporting news and personalities, for example: "Who is known as the founding father of Russian rugby league"?

==== The South Coast News ====
One of the show's most popular scripted segments was "The South Coast News", a parody news bulletin read by real-life journalist and TV presenter Paul Murphy. It ran for several years in the late 1980s and early 1990s and two volumes of scripts were later published in book form, with illustrations by cartoonist Bill Leak, who had an enduring relationship with the duo.

The basic conceit of the sketch was that the small New South Wales south coast town of Ulladulla was heavily populated by famous Australian sporting and show business identities, that many of these celebrities owned businesses in the area or worked in various official capacities in the town, and that all were regularly involved in hilarious and often ribald misadventures.

Prominent recurring characters included the town's mayor, renowned TV composer and conductor Tommy Tycho, former TV wrestler Mario Milano, owner of the Bluebird Cafe, and former NSW Premier Barrie Unsworth, owner of the disreputable 'Cardigan Club'. This fictional Ulladulla also boasted a colossal statue of long-distance swimmer Linda McGill ("The Big Linda", which stood astride the entrance to the boat harbour and featured a revolving restaurant in its head). All the streets were named after sporting or TV stars, and the local high school was named after rugby league player Barry Beath.

=== Advertising parodies ===
Doyle and Pickhaver wrote dozens of parody advertisements for a vast range of imaginary products and services provided by Roy and Nelson's numerous fictional companies, most of which were gathered under the Nelson-Slaven Industries banner.

These included services such as the HG Nelson Butchery ("still doing things with meat other butchers only dream of"), Roy's Rectal Ring Balm (a rectal ointment), Happy Jack's Ta-taa Packs (a body bag), Angus Fraser Paints ("If you've got nothing to say the whole world can hear it"), as well as innumerable parody books, films and TV series. Other highlights included a long-running series of fake ads for Istengar, an esoteric branch of yoga that teaches practitioners how to create works of art from their own faeces. Another fake ad, satirising the Nine Network's The Footy Show, promotes Rex Mossop's Rugby League Finishing School, which offers training to footballers hoping to pursue a career in the media.

In later years, real-life sporting stars such as rugby league players Stan Jurd and Paul Sironen also recorded parodic voiceovers for the show promoting fictional bodies such as the National Rugby League Party, a fictitious political organisation. Another recurring voiceover character was Sydney car dealer Frosty Lahood (voiced by ABC NewsRadio sports reporter David Lord), whose famous "No root: no toot" deal offered customers their money back if the attractive new vehicle (usually a Daewoo Nubira or Hyundai Lantra) did not enable the buyer to "get a root" within 24 hours of purchase.

== Humour and terms ==
Much of Roy and HG's comedy was topical, poking fun at current sporting news, the foibles, ego trips and media gaffes of sporting, film and music stars, and the often risible phraseology used by sporting writers and commentators.

Their uniquely Australian form of linguistic comedy that often verges on the obscene, and they have coined many memorable terms, while others revive archaic expressions from their youth, and many have since entered Australian vernacular. This includes:

- "bed flute" or simply "flute"—the male sex organ
- "bugger-all to the power of less"—nothing
- "bush-junk"—useless native or introduced wild animals, suitable only for shooting
- "date"—anus
- "dwahl"—a slump in sporting form or a period of poor performance
- "football head"—the Zen-like focus or mindset required to play a good game of footy; underperforming players are often described as not having their football head on
- "half dream room, the"—an unconscious state, usually derived from a concussion; Nelson often claimed certain players were at their best when playing concussed
- "horizontal folk dancing"—sexual intercourse
- "(Planet) Koozbane"—a perennial Nelson-ism applied to sportspersons who have been stunned by a heavy blow, fall or tackle. The term is believed to derive from the name of the home planet of the alien puppet characters featured on The Muppet Show and Sesame Street
- "love-tap"—a blow inflicted on another player (usually during League or ARL games) without the intention of inflicting serious harm
- "night-tools"—genital organs
- "night-tool work"—sexual intercourse
- "room of mirrors, the"—a metaphorical mirror-lined room to which players are (or should be) banished for a period of time, in order to renew their motivation by "taking a long, hard look at themselves"
- "set of seven"—one week, in reference to the expression "set of six" (tackles) from Rugby league
- "sloop"—penis; the organ is said to be "pointing north" when erect
- "stink"—a fight
- "Sweet Science, The"—boxing
- "yips, the"—a grave condition that adversely affects the performance of professional golfers

The duo are well known for their lengthy, hyperbolic dissertations on the characters of sporting and cultural identities.

He will often describe the subject as "a hopeless joke", and declare that they are a fool to him/herself and to his/her family, state and country of origin; this climactic phase of his analysis is usually delivered at the top of his voice. Yet, paradoxically, Slaven almost invariably concludes these harangues with quiet, amiable remarks on what a nice person the subject is, how much he likes them, and how much he or she has contributed to their particular field of endeavour. This can also be reversed such as when commentating the first Melbourne Grand Prix he praised the track as "the best in the world... superior to Monza, Spa and Hockenheim" which were all "rubbish". When there was a big crash on the first corner he claimed the track was to blame because it was "a joke".

Although usually more concise than Slaven, and typically taking the role of presenter/interviewer who sets out the subject and poses questions for Slaven to comment on, Nelson has his own unique and colourful editorial style. On many occasions he has described decisions or innovations with which he disagrees as "a hastily cobbled-together farrago". He once promised that he would "walk nude down George Street with a pie on my head" if the outcome of a sporting fixture did not match his prediction, and during one especially memorable rant he denounced golfer Greg Norman as "a hapless water buffalo, wallowing around in the swamp, waiting for the safari to wander by and finish him off".

In his roundup of the 2006 Melbourne Cup, Nelson described the unusual hat he had worn to the event, which was fashioned in the form of a miniature chicken-processing factory, and which automatically dispensed tiny chickens for "the kiddies". The duo have also long been advocates of the concept of employing "celebrity shooters" at racing fixtures—i.e. hiring well-known personalities to 'put down' horses that are badly injured during races and in 2008 they energetically promoted the concept of a national pig-shoot for peace.

TV programming is another favourite target for duo's satire. Responding to the growth in reality TV programming, Slaven suggested several innovative new programs including "Celebrities With Gastric" and "Celebrity Horses With Gastric".

Cricket legend Sir Donald Bradman has long been a target of the duo's satire, and it is now well established—at least according to Roy and HG—that Bradman was a spy for the Japanese during World War II. They have also deduced that, in his twilight years, "The Don" was locked in a shed at the back of his house in Bowral, NSW and forced to sign millions of items of all descriptions in order to capitalise on the inevitably lucrative market in Bradman memorabilia that would emerge after his death.

=== Player nicknames ===
List of player nicknames and descriptions
Player name	Term	Reason
Braith Anasta	The most overrated man in Rugby League	Came about as a result of repeated Rugby league player polls in which Anasta was often nominated as the most overrated player by his peers.
Martin Bella	Squirrel Gripper	Came about as a result of Bella's penchant for employing the "squirrel grip" or "Christmas handshake" which involves firmly gripping an opponent's testicles during a tackle performed in the sport of Rugby league.
Martin Bella	The Bellaphant	
Danny Buderus	Butterball Buderus	Because of his poor ball handling in a State of Origin match.
Dean Brogan	Dick Head	Brogan took exception to being called Dick Head at Adelaide Airport by a heckler and punched the offender in the nose, he was subsequently fined by the AFL and Port Adelaide.
Ben Cousins	Rolled Note	Derived from Cousins's after-hours work with the white powder.
Ben Cousins	Ben Off The Gear Cousins	Developed after Cousins declared himself clean and ready to resume his football career.
Greg Dowling	Dish-head Dowling	
Ben Elias	Backdoor Benny	Often shortened to simply The Door or B.D.B. Elias.
Israel Folau	The Queensland wunderkind	Refers to a newspaper report; often said sotto voce to show Slaven's displeasure with the use of a German word.
Richard Fromberg	Clay court specialist	Refers to one good tournament that Frommers had on clay. Ever after he was considered Australia's clay court specialist.
Mark Gasnier	Fire Up Bitch! aka "The Fire Up Bitch Man"	Gasnier was fired from the 2004 New South Wales State of Origin team for leaving an obscene voice mail message on a woman's mobile phone after a 'bonding session'. The transcript of the phone message is as follows: "Where the fuck are you? There's four toey humans in the cab and our cocks are fat and ready to spurt sauce. It's 20 to four...and you're in bed, fuck me. Fire up, you sad cunt." Roy and HG also shorten this nickname to variations such as "the F.U.B.", "fubby" and "the fubster".
Mark Gasnier	The Shimmy, Shimmy, Whoosh! Man.	From an NRL Pog describing Gasnier's step maneuver as the Shimmy, Shimmy, Whoosh.
Mark Gasnier	Dare I say	A reference to the frequent use of "Dare I say" as a preface to comments in Marks regular newspaper column which appears in the Daily Telegraph.
Mark Geyer	The Tap	He can run hot and cold, or "turn it on" i.e. on-field violence. By extension, Geyer's younger brother Matt is "Tap II".
Barry Hall	Hitman	'Hitman' came about due to Roy and HG looking for a nickname for Hall to make his boxing debut under.
Barry Hall	Barry Deck The Hall	Another nickname that was developed for Hall's boxing career.
Solomon Haumono	Captain Feathers	Constructed due to the lack of a fighting name for Haumono when he began his boxing career following his rugby league career.
Jarryd Hayne	Hip-Head	As a result of Hayne being knocked out momentarily after attempting to make a tackle in Game III of the 2008 State of Origin series, in which his head cannoned into his opponent's hip.
Mark Hensby	The forgotten man of Australian golf	A reference to Hensby's laments in national newspapers that he was the "forgotten man" of golf.
Lleyton Hewitt	Little	Due to Hewitt's diminutive size.
Terry Hill	King of the Kids or The Lobster Fisherman	The latter title derived from an incident after his playing days, when Hill was caught stealing lobsters from pots that didn't belong to him, resulting in Hill facing the magistrates' court, where he his defence was that he "didn't know what he was doing".
John Hopoate	Stinkfist, The Proctologist	A reference to an infamous incident during a 2001 NRL game when, in an attempt to unsettle the opposing team, Hopoate forcibly pushed his finger into the anuses of three opposing players. This led to speculation by Roy and HG that Hopoate may have in fact been acting as an unofficial proctologist and that he was doing the players a favour because his impromptu rectal examination may have detected early signs of serious illness.
Alan Jones	The Parrot	
Senator Rod Kemp	The "Eh-Eh" Man	Kemp is the former federal Minister for Arts and Sport (2001–2007) whose nickname parodies his halting manner of speech. In the final years of the series Kemp was often held up as a supposed model of excellence in his portfolio, usually by way of an unfavourable comparison with the current incumbent (e.g. "This wouldn't have happened if The Eh-Eh Man was still in charge, Roy!"). On one occasion Roy summed up Kemp's distinctive facial hair (a beard without a moustache) by saying "He's got that type of beard that says 'I'm a failed psychologist' ".
Glenn Lazarus	The Brick With Eyes	The nickname is because of Glenn's large, solid physique. Roy and HG have also called him "Dr. Death". The United Kingdom's The Sun newspaper once got this name wrong and called him "The Brick with Ears".
Glenn Lazarus	Dr. Death	
Wally Lewis and Allan Langer	The King and I	A reference to the Rodgers and Hammerstein musical. Wally Lewis's nickname is 'King Wally', making his teammate Allan Langer the 'I'. Langer was usually referred to as "Deborah Kerr", the actress who played the "I" in the movie version with Yul Brynner.
Greg Norman	The Paleface Adios of Golf	A reference to Norman's drawn-out career.
Greg Norman	G.W. Shark	Abbreviation of Norman's usual nickname. In one program, Roy noted that Norman had designed a new model for Holden, 'The Holden Shark', which (according to Roy) featured an extended choke in the shape of a 1 wood.
Willie Mason	The Brainstrust	A satirical reference to the fact that Mason's well-known propensity for aggressive behaviour was explained by the fact that he reportedly suffers from an autism spectrum disorder.
Willie Mason	The New Face of the Eastern Suburbs	
Les Mason	Mad-Dog	Introduced due to the lack of a nickname for Mason, as compared to Captain Feathers and Stinkfist.
Steve Menzies	Beaver	Other Roy and HG name variations include "Beav", "The Flying Beaver" and "Leave it to Beaver" along with "Beaver Las Vegas".
Steve Menzies	Methuselah	A poke at Menzies' relatively old playing age in the twilight of his career.
Steve Mortimer	Prince of Darkness	
Mark Philippoussis	The dangerous floater	A double reference, both to the media constantly promoting Philippoussis as a hidden threat in tennis tournaments, and also a play on Philippoussis's nickname 'The Poo'. Usually invoked with reference to the U.S. Open at Flushing Meadow.
Julian O'Neill	The Poo in the Shoe	O'Neill, who has a history of off-field misconduct, including two DUI charges and urinating under casino blackjack tables on two separate occasions, was involved in a 1999 pre-season incident which led to his South Sydney Rabbitohs being banned from a Dubbo hotel. Following years of personal and professional turmoil, O'Neill trashed the Dubbo hotel room by smearing the walls with faeces. A direct quote from the horse's mouth describing a further bad deed from the night was "hey Schlossie, I just shat in your shoe".
Wendell Sailor	Ding Dong Dell	
Wendell Sailor	Hello Sailor	
Casey Stoner	The Real Deal	From an article in a local paper, in reference to his dominance in MotoGP, "The Real Deal" was used to describe Stoner as a genuine competitor for the Moto GP title.
Ricky Stuart	The Angry Ant	
Ricky Stuart	Carlos Smearson	From 2009, when the Sharks played a home game in Adelaide, their media manager organised a radio interview for Ricky Stuart on FIVEaa &, for a joke, told the station that his name was Carlos Smearson. That led to an introduction along the lines of, "and now joining us it's the coach of the Cronulla Sharks NRL team, Carlos Smearson. Welcome to the show Carlos...."
Ricky Stuart	The Game's Greatest Thinker	
Timana Tahu	Tim Tam Tahu	Named after the Australian chocolate biscuit brand, Tim Tams.
Kostya Tszyu	The Russian-born, Sydney-based powerhouse	A direct quote from a newspaper article.
Mark Webber	"The DNF maestro", "DNF Specialist", "DNF Hero"	An acronym derived from the perception that the Formula One driver earned numerous "DNF" (did not finish) race results early in his Formula One career due to collisions or mechanical breakdowns.
Shane Webcke	BigPond	Taken from Webcke (Web-key) to Website and Australia's largest internet service provider Telstra Big Pond.
Karrie Webb	The Funnel	A reference to the Sydney Funnel Web Spider.
Tiger Woods	The man they call Tiger	A reference to sports reporter Tim Webster, who has a habit of constantly introducing sporting celebrities using the term "the man they call (first name)".
Kevan Gosper	Lord Gosper	A reference to Gosper's overly officious and self-righteous nature when it comes to matters concerning sport, particularly the Olympics .
Anthony Minichiello	The Count	A reference to his resemblance to Sesame Street's The Count.

== State of Origin commentaries ==
Besides This Sporting Life, Roy and HG have also provided radio commentary for the National Rugby League's three annual State of Origin series matches, as well as the NRL and AFL grand finals (dubbed the "Festival of the Boot", parts one and two). Their commentary often features sensationalist over-reactions to the game at hand, such as calling for entire teams of players to be sacked after losses, or even questioning whether certain teams will ever win another match in the future. The commentary is also notable for its overly biased support of whichever team is winning, and the calling of every player on the field by their assigned nicknames.

== Television ==
This Sporting Life was adapted to a television show on ABC TV, which was broadcast from 1993 to 1994. Their first endeavour on screen together, it was described as Pickhaver as punk television: it was a low-rent production—essentially their radio program with pictures. The duo later went on to host several TV programs for other projects.

== Compilations ==
- This Sporting Life (2×CD, released 19 August 2016) – celebrating 30 years of This Sporting Life.

== Awards ==
In November 2003, This Sporting Life was named Outstanding Networked Radio Comedy Performance at the inaugural Australian Comedy Awards in Melbourne.

The 30th anniversary compilation album of the show released in 2016 won the ARIA Award for Best Comedy Release in 2016.

== Legacy ==
This Sporting Life was added to the National Film and Sound Archive's Sounds of Australia registry in 2013, which collects "recordings of cultural, historical and aesthetic significance to Australia."
