= The Dream with Roy and HG =

2000; 2004 sports comedy Australian TV series

- Also known as: The Dream
- Presented by: Roy and HG
- Country of origin: Australia
- Original language: English
- No. of seasons: 2
- No. of episodes: 30

Production
- Running time: 120 minutes

Original release
- Network: Seven Network
- Release: 16 September 2000 – 28 August 2004

Related
- The Ice Dream with Roy and HG

The Dream with Roy and HG was a sports comedy talk show that was broadcast every night during the 2000 Summer Olympics and 2004 Summer Olympics, presented by Australian comedy duo Roy and HG.

The broadcasts featured interviews with Olympians from several countries. Interviewees received commemorative gifts, some of which later became collectors’ items associated with the Games.

Due to the attention on Australia as the host nation, the 2000 season took the form of a two-hour show and was made available to Olympic broadcasters internationally; the 2004 season was a one-hour show broadcast in Australia only.

The pair became well known for their commentary of certain events, particularly the men's gymnastics. Speaking with mock-seriousness, Roy and H.G. used fictitious terminology to describe various manoeuvres. Such coined terms included adapted vernacular such as "battered sav" and "Chiko Roll", and other inventions like "flat bag", "Dutch wink", "crazy date" and "hello boys" that became familiar to viewers worldwide. Roy and H.G. also interspersed their commentary with made-up "facts" about the competitors, such as their occupation and pre-match preparation routines. Other running jokes included showing slow-motion clips of Greco-Roman wrestling accompanied by raunchy Barry White music and the very snugly fitting outfits worn by the male Rowing teams.

They also popularised Fatso the Fat-Arsed Wombat as their mascot, dismissing the official mascots as "Olly, Millie, and Dickhead". This was emphasised in a satirical diving contest between Fatso, the three official mascots, and the Boxing Kangaroo later in the Games. Fatso's huge popularity during the series caused consternation with the Australian Olympic Committee, who at first tried to ban the character from Olympic events after Australian athletes appeared carrying Fatso dolls at medal ceremonies. When auctioned for charity at the end of the series, Fatso was purchased by Seven Network CEO Kerry Stokes for A$80,450. A statue of Fatso was later erected at the Olympic Park site.

Insulting New Zealanders, particularly by way of the medal tally, was also a favourite pastime of Roy. When New Zealand won their first gold of the Games in the rowing, he remarked: "And New Zealanders perform at their best when they're sitting down going backwards." During the 2004 season, Norway was insulted frequently, along with New Zealanders, as was former Olympic host city Atlanta, which Roy regularly denounced as "the toilet".

== Spin-off shows ==
The show's popularity during the 2000 season prompted the creation of two spin-off shows, broadcast in Australia only—The Ice Dream during the 2002 Winter Olympics in Salt Lake City, and The Cream, during the 2003 Rugby World Cup. The show's success also spawned The Monday Dump, a weekly sports/talk show with a similar format but lacking the central focus of a single sporting event.

== Awards ==
In 2001, the show won Most Popular Sports Program at the Logies. In 2005, the show was nominated for the same category.

== See also ==
- Australia at the Olympics
