= Pia Miranda =

Australian actress (born 1973)

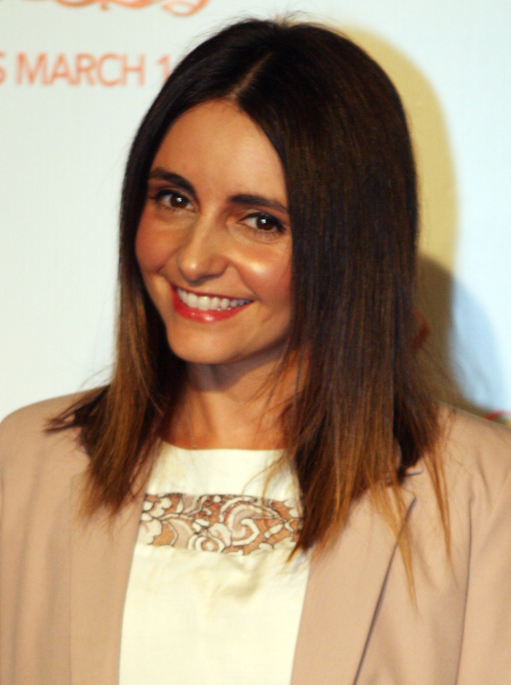
- Miranda in 2013
- Born: 15 June 1973 (age 53); Melbourne, Victoria, Australia
- Education: Sacré Cœur School; Victoria University, Melbourne (BA); Atlantic Theater Company
- Occupation: Actress
- Years active: 1997−present
- Spouse: Luke Hanigan (m. 2001)
- Children: 2

Pia Miranda is an Australian actress. Her career was launched with her role in the 2000 feature film Looking for Alibrandi, an Australian film based on the novel of the same name by Melina Marchetta. She is also known for her roles as Karen Oldman in Neighbours (1998–1999), Jodie Spiteri in Wentworth (2015), and Jen in Mustangs FC (2017–2020), as well as winning Australian Survivor in 2019.

== Early life ==
Born in Melbourne, Victoria, Miranda spent the majority of her early life travelling throughout Australia with her family, attending a large number of schools. She returned to Melbourne at the age of 12, growing up in the suburb of East Malvern. She is of Italian and Irish descent. After completing her high school certificate at the Sacré Cœur School, Miranda studied history and drama at La Trobe University before transferring to Victoria University, where she majored in drama and graduated with a Bachelor of Arts (Performance Studies) in 1996.

== Career ==
=== Film and television career ===
After university, Miranda studied drama at the Atlantic Theater Company in New York for one year before playing Karen Oldman on the Australian soap Neighbours, from 1998 to 1999. At this time, she was also starring in the ABC television series Bondi Banquet, playing Jo Tognetti. This was the starting point for Miranda's future success within the Australian film and television industry, quickly being chosen for the role of Josephine Alibrandi in the hugely successful Australian film Looking for Alibrandi, directed by Kate Woods in 1999.

The movie was based on the novel written by Melina Marchetta in 1992, where seventeen-year-old Josephine Alibrandi deals with the stresses of Year Twelve, her illegitimacy, the reunion with her father, new-found companionship, the death of her close friend and life as a third-generation migrant in contemporary Australian society. Miranda co-starred with fellow prominent Australian actors Kick Gurry, Anthony LaPaglia, Greta Scacchi, Elana Cotta and Matthew Newton. The movie received critical acclaim, with Pia Miranda receiving the Australian Film Institute award in 2000 for Best Actress for her performance. Her role in Looking for Alibrandi also earned her a nomination in 2001 for an FCCA Award in the Best Actor - Female category which she lost to Julia Blake.

In 2002, Miranda played a small role in the US movie, Queen of the Damned, although her scene was cut from the film as it appeared on the DVD. Also in 2002, Pia Miranda starred in The Doppelgangers. The movie was part of a project where eight Australian filmmakers were given a short film script by celebrated writer Brendan Cowell. Filmmakers had to name their own film and characters and adhere to a set of rules, such as shooting on digital cameras and making no dialogue changes. The project had limited success.

Following The Doppelgangers, Miranda starred in another Australian film Garage Days, playing Tanya. The coming-of-age comedy revolved around a young Sydney band trying to gain a foothold in the competitive pub rock scene. The movie was well received within Australia and is available on DVD. In 2003, Miranda played the role of Leanne Ferris in Travelling Light, about two sisters growing up in Adelaide in the early 1970s. Following this, Miranda also starred in Right Here Right Now in 2004.

Though Miranda is best known as a film actress, she has also featured in some television series. She was a recurring guest star on the long-running drama All Saints in 1998, the drama The Time of Our Lives in 2013 and 2014, and the popular Australian drama The Secret Life of Us, playing Talia. Miranda has also been featured in The Glass House, Grass Roots and the Australian talk shows The Panel and The Project.

Miranda has also worked as a celebrity artist for A Midwinter Night's Dream, a ticketed charity auction of art with pillow cases as the medium and inspired by the childhood dreams of artists and celebrities, to raise money for War Child Australia and was a judge for the 2005 Project Greenlight competition alongside fellow actors such as Sam Worthington. Miranda's sister, Nicole, starred in the Australian film Moving Out with Vince Colosimo. In 2014, she performed in Standing on Ceremony, nine plays on gay marriage written by Neil LaBute and Paul Rudnick.

Miranda starred in the popular Australian prison drama Wentworth in 2015. She has played a recurring role in the teenage comedy drama Mustangs FC as Jen since 2017.

Miranda was a contestant on the sixth season of Australian Survivor. A long time fan of the Survivor franchise, Miranda's casting resulted from an interview with the television blog TV Tonight, where she revealed her "guilty pleasure" of Survivor before being called by producers to see if she was interested in participating on the show as a "Champion" for the Champions V Contenders theme. After 50 days of competition, she ultimately won the series, winning the final jury vote unanimously 9–0 over fellow finalist Baden Gilbert. In 2021 she was inducted into the Australian Survivor Hall Of Fame.

In 2022, Miranda appeared as Thong on the fourth season of The Masked Singer Australia. She was the third contestant to be revealed, and placed tenth overall.

In May 2023, it was announced that Miranda would be participating in the twentieth series of Dancing with the Stars. She was paired with Declan Taylor.

In October 2023 Miranda released her first book, a memoir titled Finding My Bella Vita, which tells the story of how Looking for Alibrandi changed her life and how her career almost went in a very different way.

In March 2024, Miranda was named as part of the cast for Stan Australia series Invisible Boys. Miranda would also appear in the Stan Australia movie Windcatcher.

== Personal life ==
In March 2001, Miranda married her boyfriend Luke Hanigan, lead singer and guitarist of the Australian band Lo-Tel, at the Elvis Presley chapel in Las Vegas after four months of dating. The couple have two children.

== Filmography ==
=== Film ===
Year	Title	Role	Notes
2000	Looking for Alibrandi	Josie Alibrandi	Won — AACTA Award for Best Actress in a Leading Role; Nominated — FCCA Award for Best Actor, Female
2002	Queen of the Damned	Jesse's Roommate	
2002	Garage Days	Tanya	
2002	The Doppelgangers	Cornell	Short
2003	Travelling Light	Leanne Ferris	
2004	Right Here Right Now	Mads	
2007	The Girl Who Swallowed Bees	Girl	Short
2008	Three Blind Mice	Sally	
2008	The Tender Hook	Daisy	
2011	Surviving Georgia	Heidi	
2013	Goddess	Sophie	
2015	Telepathy	Alina	Short
2021	The Odyssey	Mrs. A	Short
2021	Seen	Pia-Ryan's Sister	
2023	Slant	Maggie Kopoulos	Film
2024	Windcatcher	Miss Berrick	

=== Television ===
Year	Title	Role	Notes
1998–1999	Neighbours	Karen Oldman	19 episodes
2000	Bondi Banquet	Jo Tognetti	
2000	All Saints	Brittany Finlay	6 episodes
2003	Grass Roots	Ruth Levine	Episode: "Youth"
2003–2004	The Secret Life of Us	Talia	7 episodes
2011	The Jesters	The Voice	Episode: "Go For Gold"
2011	Sea Patrol	Tracey McQueen	Episode: "Lifeline"
2013–2014	The Time of Our Lives	Kristen	6 episodes
2015	Wentworth	Jodie Spiteri	8 episodes
2017	Sherazade: The Untold Stories	Jinan (voice)	7 episodes
2017–2020	Mustangs FC	Jen	26 episodes
2018	True Story with Hamish & Andy	Mrs. D	Episode: "Stephen's Meet The Parents Story"
2018	Back in Very Small Business	Sandi	2 episodes
2019	The Drop Off	Nicola McGinty	2 episodes
2019	Welfare	Dr. Michele Henderson	Episode: "PTSD"
2022	Riptide	Jenny Clark	2 episodes
2023	Aunty Donna's Coffee Cafe	Nic	Episode: "1.4"
2023	Heat	Sarah Cameron	4 episodes
2025	Darby and Joan	Silvia	Guest: 1 episode
2025	Invisible Boys	Anna Calogero	8 episodes

=== Other appearances ===
Year	Title	Role	Notes	Ref
2019	Show Me the Movie!	Herself	Episode: "2.2"	
2019	Australian Survivor	Contestant	24 episodes, Sole Survivor; Season: "Champions vs Contenders II"	
2019	Have You Been Paying Attention?	Herself	Episode: "Have You Been Paying Attention to 2019?"	
2022	Would I Lie to You?	Herself	Episode: "1.7"	
2022	The Masked Singer	Contestant / Thong	2 episodes	
2022	The Hundred with Andy Lee	Herself	Episode: "3.8"	
2023	The Cook up with Adam Liaw	Herself	1 episode	
2023	Dancing with the Stars	Contestant		
2024	The Big Trip	Self		
2024	Shaun Micallef's Eve of Destruction	Herself	Episode 6	
2025	Memory Bites with Matt Moran	Guest		
2025	Claire Hooper's House Of Games	Self	5 episodes	

== Stage ==
Year	Title	Role	Notes
1983	The Nutcracker	Maid	Playhouse, Canberra
1999	The Wild Duck	Hedvig Ekdal	STCSA & Glen Street Theatre, Sydney
2000	Sweet Road		Stables Theatre, Sydney with Ensemble Theatre
2001	Fireface	Olga	Wharf Theatre, Sydney with Sydney Theatre Company for Sydney Festival
2004	The Glass Menagerie	Laura Wingfield	Playhouse, Melbourne with Melbourne Theatre Company
2004	The Unlikely Prospect of Happiness	Zoe Sparkes	Sydney Theatre with Sydney Theatre Company
2007	ALP Arts Election Launch		Riverside Theatres Parramatta
2016	Around the World in 80 Days	Passepartout	Alex Theatre, Melbourne
2023	Finding my Bella Vita (reading)	Herself	Australian book tour

== Audio ==
=== Podcasts ===
Year	Title	Notes
2019-2021	Rob Has a Podcast	Guest; 5 episodes

=== Audiobooks ===
Year	Title	Notes
2020	What Zola Did on Monday	Written by Melina Marchetta ISBN 978-1760895150
