= Looking for Alibrandi =

Looking for Alibrandi may refer to:

- Looking for Alibrandi (novel), a 1992 novel by Australian author Melina Marchetta
- Looking for Alibrandi (film), a 2000 Australian film, based on the novel
