= The Alice (TV series) =

Australian television drama series

- Genre: Drama
- Created by: Justin Monjo; Robyn Sinclair
- Starring: Erik Thomson
- Theme music composer: Stephen Rae
- Country of origin: Australia
- Original language: English
- No. of series: 1
- No. of episodes: 22

Production
- Executive producers: John Edwards; Posie Graeme-Evans
- Producer: Jo Rooney
- Production location: Alice Springs
- Running time: 60 minutes (inc. commercials)
- Production companies: ApolloProScreen Filmproduktion; Southern Star Productions

Original release
- Network: Nine Network
- Release: 31 July 2005 – 16 January 2006

The Alice was an Australian drama television series created by Justin Monjo and Robyn Sinclair. It was set in the central outback city of Alice Springs. The program began as a successful TV movie, The Alice, that later spun off a regular series. The series proved less popular and was cancelled by the Nine Network on 28 September 2005 after a sharp decline in its ratings. The entire series and original TV movie have since been released on DVD.

== Cast ==
=== Main / regular ===
- Jessica Napier as Jess Daily
- Erik Thomson as Jack Jaffers
- Caitlin McDougall as Helen Gregory
- Simon Burke as Patrick
- Patrick Brammall as Matt Marione
- Roxane Wilson as Ellie Delaney
- Brett Stiller as Toby Delaney
- Andrew McFarlane as Hugh Delaney
- Anne Louise Lambert as Heaven Daily
- Luke Carroll as Michael Anderson
- Henry Hereford as Adam Cooper
- Steve Dodd
- Kick Gurry as Darren

=== Guests ===
- Dee Smart as Maxine (2 episodes)
- Jodie Dry as Beverley (1 episode)
- Kristy Wright as Simone (1 episode)
- Lenka Kripac as Sally Fleming (2 episodes)
- Paula Arundell as Lara (1 episode)
- Rel Hunt as Kane (1 episode)
- Robert Mammone as Simon (3 episodes)

== Awards and nominations ==
=== APRA-AGSC Screen Music Awards ===
The annual APRA-AGSC Screen Music Awards are presented by Australasian Performing Right Association (APRA) and Australian Guild of Screen Composers (AGSC) for television and film scores and soundtracks.

Year	Nominee / work	Award	Result
2005	The Alice (David Bridie)	Best Music for a Mini-Series or Telemovie	Nominated
2005	"Pitjantjara" (Bridie, Frank Yamma) – The Alice	Best Original Song Composed for a Feature Film, Telemovie, TV Series or Mini-Series	Won

== See also ==
- List of Australian television series
