= The Tender Hook =

- Theatrical poster
- Directed by: Jonathan Ogilvie
- Written by: Jonathan Ogilvie
- Produced by: Michelle Harrison; John Brousek
- Starring: Hugo Weaving; Rose Byrne; Matt Le Nevez; Pia Miranda; Luke Carroll; John Batchelor; Tyler Coppin
- Cinematography: Geoffrey Simpson
- Edited by: Ken Sallows
- Music by: Chris Abrahams
- Production companies: Mandala Films; Film Finance
- Distributed by: Dendy Films
- Release dates: 30 May 2008 (Dungog Film Festival); 18 September 2008 (Australia)
- Running time: 99 minutes
- Country: Australia
- Language: English
- Budget: A$7 million
- Box office: A$40,390

The Tender Hook is a 2008 Australian film noir directed by Jonathan Ogilvie and starring Hugo Weaving, Rose Byrne and Matthew Le Nevez. The film was retitled The Boxer and the Bombshell for its North American DVD release.

== Plot synopsis ==
The film tells the story of a love triangle set in a stylised version of Sydney's criminal/boxing underworld in the 1920s. The story is about Iris' rise to the apex of a love/power triangle that includes her English con man, lover, McHeath, and Art an honest, young boxer. Within the flawed moral landscape each character struggles to establish their sovereignty.

== Cast ==
- Hugo Weaving as McHeath
- Rose Byrne as Iris
- Matt Le Nevez as Art Walker
- Pia Miranda as Daisy
- Luke Carroll as Alby "Othello" O'Shea
- John Batchelor as Ronnie
- Tyler Coppin as Donnie

== Production ==
The Tender Hook is the second feature by writer/director Jonathan Ogilvie, and stars Hugo Weaving, Rose Byrne, and Matt Le Nevez.

Producers are Michelle Harrison and John Brousek.

The crew includes: director of photography, Geoffery Simpson; editor, Ken Sallows; production designer, Peter Baxter; costume designer, Cappi Ireland and composition of the score by Chris Abrahams from The Necks.

The film was financed by the Film Finance Corporation Australia, and Parkland Pictures (UK), with support from Film Victoria. Parkland Pictures (UK) handled international sales, with Icon Films distributing in Australasia.

== Reception ==
The film was not a box-office success, earning only $64,232 against its $7 million budget.

Critics gave the film negative to average reviews. David Stratton and Margaret Pomeranz both gave the film 3 out of 5 stars, with Stratton explaining the film has "some very strong elements... [but] never really works as a thriller or as a romance".

== See also ==
- Cinema of Australia
