= Finnikin of the Rock =

2009 young adult fantasy novel by Melina Marchetta

- Finnikin of the Rock first edition cover.
- Author: Melina Marchetta
- Illustrator: Cathy Larsen (maps)
- Cover artist: John Churchman / Photolibrary and Dougal Waters/Getty Images (photos)
- Language: English
- Genre: Young adult, Fantasy
- Publisher: Viking Press
- Publication date: 29 September 2008
- Publication place: Australia
- Media type: Print (Hardback & Paperback)
- Pages: 416 pp (first edition)
- ISBN: 978-0-670-07281-1

Finnikin of the Rock is a 2009 young adult fantasy novel by Melina Marchetta. It follows the story of Finnikin, an exile of Lumatere, who has been away from his kingdom for over 10 years. Being forced out by a mysterious magical barrier created after the death of the royal family, he wanders the lands in search of other exiles, trying to find out what happened to his home. But when he discovers that the heir to the Lumaterean throne could still be alive, Finnikin must follow a young woman, Evanjalin, to save the prince and his kingdom.

== Background ==
Finnikin of the Rock was first published in Australia on 29 September 2008 by Viking Press in trade paperback format. In February 2010 it was released by Candlewick Press in the United States in hardback format. Finnikin of the Rock won the 2008 Aurealis Award for best young-adult novel and the 2009 Australian Book Industry Awards Older Readers award. It was also a short-list nominee for the 2009 CBCA Book of the Year: Older Readers award.

== Plot ==
Finnikin of the Rock is the son of Trevanion, the captain of the royal guard of Lumatere. But Finnikin and his guardian, Sir Topher, have not been home to Lumatere for ten years ever since the royal family's' murder, which put a curse on the whole of Lumatere, exiling all Lumatereans outside of the kingdom, and trapping the ones within. But then Finnikin is summoned to the Largrami Cloister in Sendecane to meet Evanjalin, a young woman with an incredible claim: the heir to the throne of Lumatere, Prince Balthazar, is still alive.

Finnikin, Sir Topher and Evanjalin start traveling to Sorel, Finnikin reluctantly. Sir Topher tells Evanjalin the story of the Five Days of Unspeakable. They journey to a town in Sarnak. Finnikin and Evanjalin go to the market to buy food. A thief steals Evanjalin's ruby ring. Evanjalin runs after the thief. She chases him into an alleyway but there are four men there. Finnikin comes and they both start fighting the men.

Evanjalin and Finnikin fight the men, steal a horse, and ride to Sir Topher. They see the thief again and Finnikin brings him to their camp. In the following days, the group reaches Charyn. They come to an exile camp and a man tells them that Lord August wants Finnikin and Sir Topher to travel to Belegonia. At Belegonia, Finnikin and Sir Topher ask Lord August to ask the Belegonian king to spare a piece of land for the Lumateran exiles.

Lord August says that he will only help them if they provide him with information that the king doesn't already know. Evanjalin tells him that Charyn wanted to take over Lumatere, which was between Charyn and Belegonia so that it could take over Belegonia. The group takes a ship to Sorel and they reach there. They talk but then soldiers come and Evanjalin says that Finnikin is pretending to be Balthazar. Finnikin is arrested.

In the Sorel mines, Trevanion is visited by Evanjalin who tells him that Finnikin is also in the mines. Finnikin sees his father again, Trevanion. Together they make a plan to escape. Meanwhile, Evanjalin and Sir Topher find out that their horse has been stolen. They see it in the market and Evanjalin trades the thief for it. Finnikin and his father fight the guards and manage to get out of the mines. They reach Evanjalin and Sir Topher, but Finnikin's father doubts their loyalty.

== Characters ==
Finnikin – The protagonist of the story. He is strong, brave, intelligent, and sometimes strong-headed. He is the son of Captain Trevanion.

Trevanion – Finnikin's father and captain of the King's Guard. After the curse was cast upon Lumatere, he was captured along with his hand-picked guard, they were sent to work in the mines of their neighboring countries. He hasn't seen his son Finnikin since then.

Sir Topher – Finnikin's guardian while his father remains imprisoned. Sir Topher was a tutor to the heir of Lumatere.

Prince Balthazar. The heir to the throne of Lumatere, Finnikin's childhood friend.

Evanjalin – A novice of the goddess Lagrami who joins Finnikin and his guardian Sir Topher on their quest to build a second Lumatere. She leads them to believe that Prince Balthazar, the heir to the throne of Lumatere, is alive and that they may return.

Froi – A thief whom Evanjalin and Finnikin meet on their journey. He has a nasty attitude which worsens when Evanjalin enslaves him, but slowly starts to become better throughout the story.

Isaboe – A princess of Lumatere, assumed dead until revealed to be Evanjalin.

== Critical reception ==
A.T. Ross, writing for Fantasy Book Review, noted: "Finnikin of the Rock is an unusual fantasy novel, but that does not mean it is lackluster. It is more of an extended fairy tale in atmosphere and story than a pure 'fantasy' in the way the genre is today normally conceived. This makes it a fresh entry into a genre often beset by copycat stories; if there is anything Finnikin of the Rock is copying, it is the dark fairy tale feel of the Brothers Grimm."

== Inspiration ==
Marchetta has stated that the cloister of Lagrami in the novel is based on the French island fortress of Mont Saint-Michel.

== Notes ==
- Dedication: "For Marisa and Daniela, because I've always loved being a Marchetta sister..."
