= The Alice (film) =

- Written by: Justin Monjo
- Directed by: Kate Dennis
- Starring: Erik Thomson
- Country of origin: Australia
- Original language: English

Production
- Cinematography: Louis Irving
- Running time: 90 minutes

Original release
- Release: 1 August 2004

The Alice is a 2004 Australian drama film created by Justin Monjo and Robyn Sinclair. It is set in the central outback town of Alice Springs. The made-for-TV movie was followed by a regular TV series, which proved less popular than the film and was cancelled by the Nine Network. The entire series and the original TV movie have since been released on DVD.

== Plot ==
The approach of a solar eclipse has drawn various people from all directions to Alice Springs, an Australian town in the Northern Territory, nearby which is the best point for observation.

Toby Delaney and his partners are expecting a bus-load of German tourists, but a truck driver destroys their hotel. He improvises an 'adventurous bush trip' for them, even though he has no experience with 'bush foods'. He serves them Tim Tams, which he claims to be flavoured with Witchetty grubs.

Matt Marione, a medical student with an interest in botany, takes The Ghan from Adelaide, but leaves the train at an unscheduled stop to search for a rare outback plant. He is left behind when the train leaves, and survives only by the intervention of a mysterious Aboriginal elder who seemingly appears from nowhere and vanishes the same way. Toby Delaney eventually finds and rescues him.

Connor 'The Pelican' Gregory, a fanatic runner and hillclimber jogs all the way to the eclipse site, accompanied by Helen, his unenthusiastic wife and her grumpy friend in their motorhome. He is killed when he falls over a cliff. His wife is suspected of his murder by the local police, but nothing can be proven.

Former rock musician Jack Jaffers, who deserted his band's reunion to revisit the hotel where they had their first successful gig, joins them. He is so mesmerised by the scene that he plans to buy land there and rebuild the hotel where they performed (which is now derelict).

== Cast ==
- Jessica Napier – Jess Daily
- Erik Thomson – Jack Jaffers
- Caitlin McDougall – Helen Gregory
- Simon Burke – Patrick
- Patrick Brammall – Matt Marione
- Roxane Wilson – Ellie Delaney
- Brett Stiller – Toby Delaney
- Andrew McFarlane – Hugh Delaney
- Anne Louise Lambert – Heaven Daily
- Luke Carroll – Michael Anderson
- Michael Denkha – Motorcycle Cop
- Felicity Price – Felicity Marione

== See also ==
- The Alice (TV series)
