= The Postcard Bandit (film) =

2003 television film directed by Tony Tilse

- Written by: Peter Gawler
- Directed by: Tony Tilse
- Starring: Tom Long, Brett Stiller, Matthew Le Nevez
- Country of origin: Australia
- Original language: English

Production
- Producer: Matt Carroll
- Running time: 106 minutes

Original release
- Network: Nine Network
- Release: 1 June 2003

The Postcard Bandit is a 2003 Australian television film directed by Tony Tilse, loosely based on the life of a convicted bank robber Brenden James Abbott. The plot is based on the biographical book No Fixed Address by newspaperman Derek Pedley, who also assisted screenwriter Peter Gawler.

== Plot ==
Brenden Abbott is on the run with fellow criminal Aaron Reynolds, having just escaped together from Fremantle Prison, Western Australia. They rob banks across Australia before Abbott decides that it is time to live the high life for a while. To hinder identification, the two travel the country with a Japanese tourist and, during this trip, Abbott tells Reynolds he is giving him the flick. Reynolds tells Abbott, "You won't last a week without me," but it is Reynolds who is arrested some four weeks later. Although Glenn (brother) and Brenden have NO criminal history together, people are still lead to believe other wise which is incorrect.

At Gold Coast, Queensland, Brenden meets the future mother of his only son William. He soon returns to robbing banks to feed his extravagant lifestyle. Abbott's brother Glenn introduces a driver whom he uses as an accomplice to rob a Perth bank, going in through the roof and breaking his ankle in the process.

Abbott returns to Gold Coast and learns that his lover is pregnant to him. He leaves her and resumes bank robberies; she learns the true identity and character of the man she knew as "Peter". He begins seeing a prostitute, who becomes the getaway driver for his next few robberies. He teams up with his brother Glenn, who proves to be a loose cannon. He informs Glenn that he will still need his services in obtaining guns and fake ID cards, but will no longer rob banks with him. Glen replies that he is, "No good on me own," and punches Brenden before the pair go their separate ways.

Glenn is detained by police while in possession of illegal weapons, and is forced to give up information on his brother's whereabouts, resulting in Brenden's arrest at Surfers Paradise. Abbott is sent to a maximum-security prison in Brisbane, where he befriends a small-time criminal who is due for release and successfully plots an escape with four other inmates. The four are quickly recaptured, while Abbott and his new partner remain at large. The pair rob a number of banks, including his most notorious robbery, netting some $800,000 from the Commonwealth Bank at Pacific Fair, Gold Coast. Abbott's partner soon is the target of a manhunt, after killing two police officers during a failed drug deal. He goes back to Abbott distraught at his actions and the two escape to Darwin, where they remain for some time. While walking down the street one day, Abbott returns a cricket ball hit by a boy. The boy's father—a policeman—recognizes the criminal, who is recaptured and sent back to jail in Queensland.

A sequence in the film debunks the popular myth, created by police, that Abbott sent postcards to taunt them while on the run. In reality, an accomplice was caught with a roll of film which the police subsequently developed and sent prints to news media.

== Cast ==
- Tom Long as Brenden Abbott
- Brett Stiller as Glenn Abbott
- Matthew Le Nevez as Aaron Reynolds
- Geneviève Lemon as Nola
- Simon Burke as Thomas
- Helen Dallimore as Gina
- James Reyne as himself
- Nick Simpson-Deeks as Greg
- Tasma Walton as Frankie
- Felicity Price as Receptionist
- Annie Byron as Thelma Abbott
- Michael Denkha as Pippos
- Ian Bliss as Potter
- Ned Manning as Branch Manager
