= Garage Days =

- Theatrical release poster
- Directed by: Alex Proyas
- Written by: Alex Proyas; Michael Udesky; Dave Warner
- Produced by: Alex Proyas; Topher Dow; Lawrence Grey (executive); Adrienne Read
- Starring: Kick Gurry; Maya Stange; Pia Miranda; Russell Dykstra
- Cinematography: Simon Duggan
- Edited by: Richard Learoyd
- Music by: Andrew Lancaster; David McCormack; Antony Partos
- Production companies: Australian Film Finance Corporation (AFFC); Mystery Clock Cinema
- Distributed by: Fox Searchlight Pictures
- Release date: 3 October 2002
- Running time: 105 minutes
- Country: Australia
- Language: English
- Box office: $1.3 million

Garage Days is a 2002 Australian comedy-drama film directed by Alex Proyas and written by Proyas, Dave Warner and Michael Udesky. Garage Days is the story of a young Sydney garage band desperately trying to make it big in the competitive world of rock music. Its soundtrack includes the song "Garage Days" composed by David McCormack and Andrew Lancaster and performed by Katie Noonan. The climax of the film was filmed at the Homebake festival in Sydney in 2001.

The film made its US premiere at the 2003 Sundance film festival.

== Cast ==
- Kick Gurry as Freddy
- Maya Stange as Kate
- Pia Miranda as Tanya
- Russell Dykstra as Bruno
- Brett Stiller as Joe
- Chris Sadrinna as Lucy
- Andy Anderson as Kevin
- Marton Csokas as Shad Kern
- Yvette Duncan as Angie
- Tiriel Mora as Thommo
- Holly Brisley as Scarlet
- Matthew Le Nevez as Toby
- Angela Keep as Shad's Assistant
- Rohan Nichol as York Pub Manager
- Emma Lung as Freddy's Babysitter
- Gregory Apps as University Professor

== Soundtrack ==
Original music for the film was composed by Andrew Lancaster and David McCormack.

The soundtrack album was released in 2002.

1. High Voltage (The D4)
2. Alright (Supergrass)
3. Kooks (Motor Ace)
4. Buy Me A Pony (Spiderbait)
5. Rockin' It (David McCormack, Andrew Lancaster)
6. Garage Days (David McCormack, Andrew Lancaster)
7. Love is the Drug (Roxy Music)
8. Add It Up (Sonic Animation)
9. Walk Up (David McCormack, Andrew Lancaster)
10. Ghost Town (Rhombus)
11. Smash It Up (The (International) Noise Conspiracy)
12. Say What? (28 Days)
13. That's Entertainment (The Jam)
14. Masterplan (David McCormack)
15. Stop Thinking About It (Joey Ramone)
16. Mad Man (The Hives)
17. Get the Tarp (David McCormack, Andrew Lancaster, Anthony Partos)
18. Lucky Number Nine (The Moldy Peaches)
19. Help Yourself (Tom Jones)

== Reception ==
The film received mixed reviews. Based on reviews from 53 critics collected by the film review aggregator Rotten Tomatoes, 45% gave Garage Days a positive review. At Metacritic, which assigns a weighted average score out of 100 to reviews from mainstream critics, the film received an average score of 50 based on 19 reviews.

== Awards and nominations ==
- Maya Strange for Jan Logan AFI Award for Best Actress in a Supporting Role 2002 (nominated)
- Peter Grace, Tony Vaccher, Phil Winters, Simon Leadley for AFI award for best sound (nominated)
- Michael Philips for AFI award for best production design (nominated)
- "Garage Days" (Dave McCormack / Andrew Lancaster) for APRA-AGSC Screen Music Awards for Best Original Song Composed For a Feature Film, Telemovie, TV Series Or Mini-series 2003 (nominated)

== See also ==
- Cinema of Australia
- Rock music in Australia
