= Matthew Le Nevez =

Australian actor (born 1979)

- Born: 10 January 1979 (age 47); Canberra, Australian Capital Territory, Australia
- Education: National Institute of Dramatic Art (BFA)
- Occupation: Actor
- Years active: 2000–present
- Partner: Michelle Smith
- Children: 2

Matthew Le Nevez (born 10 January 1979) is an Australian actor. He is best known for his roles as Doctor Patrick Reid in the TV series Offspring, Detective Brian Dutch in the Tasmanian Gothic sci-fi television show The Kettering Incident and Agent Cal Isaac in the thriller drama series Absentia. He also played the role of Jim Marsh in the Australian series, Love Child.

== Early life ==
Le Nevez was born in Canberra, Australian Capital Territory (ACT) in 1979 and attended The French-Australian Preschool, Telopea Park School and St Edmund's College, Canberra before being accepted into NIDA aged 17. He graduated in 1999.

== Career ==
Le Nevez took a small role in Australian-made sci-fi series Farscape, followed by a part in teen drama Head Start. In 2002 he appeared in his first feature film, Garage Days, playing a drug-fuelled rock star. He then played Aaron Reynolds, accomplice to the notorious Brenden James Abbott, the Post Card Bandit, in the TV miniseries of the same name.

In 2003 came a break-through role, that of rough-and-ready Bullet Sheather in the ABC Television miniseries Marking Time, for which Le Nevez won an AFI Television Award in 2004 for Best Actor in a Supporting or Guest Role in a Television Drama or Comedy.

In 2005 Le Nevez starred in his first American film, Marvel feature film Man-Thing, as Sheriff Kyle Williams.

The film Peaches saw him sharing a screen with Hugo Weaving and Jacqueline McKenzie, but it was the 2006 role of notorious Mathew Wales (convicted of the murders of his mother Margaret Wales-King and stepfather Paul King), in the TV movie The Society Murders, that won Le Nevez critical acclaim. He won the Logie Award for Most Outstanding Actor on Australian television in 2006.

Le Nevez stars in the Australian film The Tender Hook. Written and directed by Jonathan Ogilvie, it is the story of Iris (Rose Byrne) and a love triangle that includes her roguish English lover, McHeath, and Art (Matt Le Nevez), an earnest young boxer. The film also stars his previous acting colleague, Hugo Weaving.

Le Nevez appeared as the boyfriend of "Kate" (Sibylla Budd) in the Come Walkabout commercial for Tourism Australia, directed by Baz Luhrmann.

In 2010, Le Nevez appeared in Legend of the Seeker as Leo, the new Seeker. In 2011, he became a regular in the Network Ten comedy/drama Offspring as anaesthetist Dr Patrick Reid, and continued in season 3 (2012), 4 (2013), and, after his character's death, in dream sequences during season 5 (2014) and 6(2016). Having chosen to leave the show, his character was killed off in the 12th episode of season 4. It was broadcast on 7 August 2013, and made Australian headlines following an outpouring of grief from Offspring fans.

In 2012 he played the part of Australian former cricketer Dennis Lillee in the miniseries Howzat! Kerry Packer's War about Kerry Packer's World Series Cricket.

He played the part of Damien Parer in the 2014 television film Parer's War.

In 2014, despite leaving Offspring to pursue acting in America, it was reported that Le Nevez was joining the cast of Australian T.V. series Love Child. It was announced in July 2014 that he would be co-starring in upcoming drama series The Kettering Incident.

In 2016 he starred in Brock, a Channel 10 miniseries, as Australian motor racing legend Peter Brock.

== Personal life ==
Le Nevez and his American-born wife Michelle Smith have two children.

Le Nevez is a supporter of Richmond in the AFL and Canberra Raiders in the NRL.

== Filmography ==
=== Film ===
Year	Title	Role	Notes
2002	Garage Days	Toby	Feature film
2004	Peaches	Brian	Feature film
2005	A Family Legacy	New Zealand Batsman 1	Short film
2005	Man-Thing	Sheriff Kyle Williams	Feature film
2005	Feed	Nigel	Feature film
2005	Paradise Lost	Daniel	Short film
2006	Emulsion	Actor	Short film
2007	What They Don't Know	Stan	Short film
2008	The Tender Hook	Art Walker	Feature film
2011	Deserted	Boyfriend	Short film
2017	Australia Day	Detective Mitchell Collyer	Feature film

=== Television ===
Year	Title	Role	Notes
2000	Farscape	Caveman Crichton	TV series, season 2, episode 10: "My Three Crichtons"
2001	Head Start	Terry Vaughan	TV miniseries, 3 episodes
2001	All Saints	Andy Barton	TV series, season 4, episode 26: "Law of the Jungle"
2002	MDA	Sam Livingstone	TV series, season 1, 4 episodes
2003	White Collar Blue	Larry Drevo	TV series, season 1, episode 20
2003	The Postcard Bandit	Aaron Reynolds	TV film
2003	Marking Time	Bullet Sheather	TV film
2004	Blue Heelers	Matt Proctor	TV series, season 11, episode 12: "Reasonable Doubt: Live"
2004	Love My Way	Jai	TV series, season 1, episode 4: "Spin Cycle"
2006	The Society Murders	Matthew Wales	TV film
2007	Sea Patrol	Jullian Wiseman	TV series, season 1, episode 2: "What Lies Beneath"
2010	CIA: Crime Investigation Australia	John Myles Sharpe	TV series, season 1, episode 4: "Contract to Kill/The Mornington Monster"
2010	Legend of the Seeker	Leo	TV series, season 2, 3 episodes
2010	Cops L.A.C.	Ben Ellis	TV series, season 1, episode 10: "Ghost House"
2011–2016	Offspring	Patrick Reid	TV series, seasons 2–6, 47 episodes
2012	Howzat! Kerry Packer's War	Dennis Lillee	TV miniseries, 2 episodes
2014	Parer’s War	Damien Parer	TV film
2013	The Glades	Alexanders Barnes	TV series, season 4, episode 10: "Gallerinas"
2015	The Lizzie Borden Chronicles	Bat Masterson	TV miniseries, 2 episodes
2015–16	Love Child	Jim Marsh	TV series, seasons 2–4, 8 episodes
2016	The Kettering Incident	Detective Brian Dutch	TV miniseries, 8 episodes
2015	Runner	Adam	TV film
2016	Brock	Peter Brock	TV miniseries, 2 episodes
2017	Kingdom		TV series, season 3, episode 7: "Platinum Level"
2017	Unit Zero	Dave Trace	TV film
2019	The Widow	Will Mason	TV miniseries, 7 episodes
2019–2020	Absentia	Cal Isaac	TV series, seasons 2–3, 20 episodes
2021	Celebrity MasterChef Australia	Himself (contestant)	TV series, season 2, 13 episodes
2023	Luxury Escapes: The World’s Best Holidays	Himself	TV series, season 1, episode 5: "European Cruise"

=== Theatre ===
Year	Title	Role	Notes
1997	Don’s Party	Evan	NIDA Parade Theatre
1997	The Father We Loved on a Beach by the Sea	Geoff / Second Man	NIDA Parade Theatre
1998	One Flew Over the Cuckoo's Nest	Aide Turkle	NIDA
1998	A Cry from the City of Virgins		NIDA Parade Theatre
1998	Julius Caesar	Cinna / Marullus / Pindarus	NIDA
1998	A Chaste Maid in Cheapside (or Carry on Chaste Maid)	Touchwood Jnr	NIDA Parade Theatre
1999	Twelve Angry Men	Juror # 6	NIDA Parade Theatre
1999	Cloud 9	Betty / Gerry	NIDA Parade Theatre
1999	Celluloid Heroes II	Brett	NIDA Parade Theatre

== Awards and nominations ==
Year	Award	Work	Result
2004	AFI Television Award for Best Actor in a Supporting or Guest Role in a Television Drama or Comedy	Marking Time	Won
2007	Logie Award for Most Outstanding Actor	The Society Murders	Won
2013	Logie Award for Most Popular Actor	Offspring	Nominated
2014	Logie Award for Most Popular Actor	Offspring	Nominated
