= Ten Days in the Valley =

- Genre: Drama
- Created by: Tassie Cameron
- Starring: Kyra Sedgwick; Adewale Akinnuoye-Agbaje; Erika Christensen; Kick Gurry; Josh Randall; Malcolm-Jamal Warner; Ella Thomas; Abigail Pniowsky; Francois Battiste; Felix Solis
- Composer: W. G. Snuffy Walden
- Country of origin: United States
- Original language: English
- No. of seasons: 1
- No. of episodes: 10

Production
- Executive producers: Kyra Sedgwick; Tassie Cameron; Jill Littman; David Ellison; Dana Goldberg; Marcy Ross
- Production location: Hollywood, California
- Running time: 43 minutes
- Production companies: Pentimento Productions; Cameron Pictures; Uncharted

Original release
- Network: ABC
- Release: October 1, 2017 – January 6, 2018

Ten Days in the Valley is an American drama television series that aired on ABC from October 1, 2017, through January 6, 2018. The series, starring Kyra Sedgwick, was ordered direct-to-series on August 4, 2016. After airing four episodes, ABC announced that they were pulling the series from their schedule but would air the rest of the episodes beginning December 16, 2017.

== Premise ==
A television producer's life gets complicated after her young daughter disappears in the middle of the night and the two worlds she tries to navigate violently collide.

== Cast and characters ==
=== Main ===
- Kyra Sedgwick as Jane Sadler
- Adewale Akinnuoye-Agbaje as Detective John Bird
- Kick Gurry as Pete Greene
- Erika Christensen as Ali Petrovich
- Josh Randall as Tom Petrovich
- Felix Solis as Commander Elliot Gomez
- Francois Battiste as Gus Tremblay
- Malcolm-Jamal Warner as Matt Walker
- Abigail Pniowsky as Lake Sadler-Greene

=== Recurring ===
- Emily Kinney as Casey
- Ali Liebert as Detective Nickole Bilson
- Ella Thomas as Detective Isabel Knight
- Gage Golightly as Lynn
- Marisol Ramirez as Beatriz
- Missy Peregrym as Jamie
- Carlos Sanz as Chistopher Gomez
- Currie Graham as Henry Vega

== Episodes ==
No.	Title	Directed by	Written by	Original release date	U.S. viewers (millions)
1	"Day 1: Fade In"	Carl Franklin	Tassie Cameron	October 1, 2017	3.44
Although exhausted from working on her crime drama, Jane Sadler must leave her sleeping daughter, Lake, to brainstorm rewrites in her converted office behind her house. Six hours later, she returns to the house, only to discover it locked and Lake missing. Both Jane and her sister, Ali, suspect that Jane's ex-husband, Pete, has taken Lake. Jane immerses herself in her series, expecting Lake to be found soon. However, Pete has an alibi, Jane's assistant, Casey, despite Casey leaving him early within the timeframe of Lake's disappearance. Lake is then seen being read a bedtime story by an unknown man.
2	"Day 2: Cutting Room Floor"	Colin Bucksey	Sherry White	October 8, 2017	2.59
3	"Day 3: Day Out of Days"	Sarah Pia Anderson	Aubrey Nealon	October 15, 2017	2.62
4	"Day 4: Below the Line"	Jessica Yu	Chris Roberts	October 22, 2017	2.20
5	"Day 5: Back to Ones"	Christopher Misiano	Marsha Greene	December 16, 2017	1.54
6	"Day 6: Down Day"	Steve Robin	Tassie Cameron & Sherry White	December 16, 2017	1.36
7	"Day 7: Breaking the Story"	Constantine Makris	Aubrey Nealon & Bryan Garcia	December 23, 2017	1.56
8	"Day 8: Against Type"	Bethany Rooney	Marsha Greene & Chris Roberts	December 30, 2017	1.44
9	"Day 9: Re-Cast"	Hanelle Culpepper	Sherry White & Aubrey Nealon	January 6, 2018	2.55
10	"Day 10: Fade Out"	Steve Robin	Tassie Cameron	January 6, 2018	2.24

== Production ==
The series began development in early 2016 with Demi Moore set to star. She left the project for unknown reasons, and was replaced by Kyra Sedgwick.

== Critical reception ==
The review aggregator website Rotten Tomatoes reported a 61% approval rating with an average rating of 7.45/10 based on 18 reviews. The website's consensus reads, "Ten Days in the Valley's instantly tense delivery of familiar material leads to an intriguing character study and engrossing mystery despite naggingly untapped potential." Metacritic, which uses a weighted average, assigned a score of 63 out of 100 based on 12 critics, indicating "generally favorable reviews".
