= Looking for Alibrandi (novel) =

1992 Australian novel by Melina Marchetta

- First edition
- Author: Melina Marchetta
- Cover artist: Marina Messiha
- Language: English
- Genre: Young adult novel, bildungsroman
- Publisher: Penguin Australia/Orchard Books
- Publication date: October 1992
- Publication place: Australia
- Media type: Print (Hardcover)
- Pages: 260 pp
- ISBN: 0-531-30142-7
- OCLC: 39508243
- LC Class: PZ7.M32855 Lo 1999
- Followed by: Saving Francesca, 2003

Looking for Alibrandi is the debut novel of Australian author Melina Marchetta, published in 1992. A film adaptation of the same name was made in 2000, and a stage adaptation was commissioned and performed in 2022.

== Plot ==
Josephine (nicknamed "Josie") Alibrandi, is an Italian-Australian teenager living in Glebe, an inner-west suburb in Sydney, with her mother, Christina Alibrandi. Josie attends a Catholic girls high school where she is disillusioned with the cliques and social politics of her snobby peers. Her usually sophisticated, outspoken demeanour is challenged when she is overcome with the pressures of her final year of high school: the suicide of her friend, John Barton, and meeting her estranged father, Michael Andretti, who is in Sydney on a business trip. She confides in a young man with a bad reputation, Jacob Coote, and they slowly develop a romantic relationship. This relationship, mirrored by the tumultuous relationship with her father, forms the centre complications of the novel as Josie tries to navigate through the complexities and hurdles she faces as a young adult.

== Awards ==
- Won - CBCA Children's Book of the Year Award: Older Readers (1993)
- Won - Books I Love Best Yearly: Older Readers Award (1995)
- Won - Books I Love Best Yearly: Older Readers Award (2000)

== Adaptations ==
The world premiere of the play Looking for Alibrandi, based on the novel, was created and performed by the PACT Youth Theatre in Sydney in 1995. It sold out for three seasons, leading to the making of a film adaptation.

The film Looking for Alibrandi (2000) starred Pia Miranda as Josephine Alibrandi, Anthony LaPaglia as her father, Michael Andretti, and Kick Gurry as her boyfriend, Jacob Coote. Melina Marchetta wrote the screenplay.

Playwright and comedian Vidya Rajan created another stage adaptation of the novel, which was commissioned and directed by Stephen Nicolazzo in a production that played at the Malthouse Theatre in Melbourne in July 2022 and then at the Belvoir in Sydney in October. In 2025, Nicolazzo, as director of Brink Productions, re-staged the play for a 12-venue national tour, opening at the Adelaide Festival Centre on 22 May.
