= Melina Marchetta =

Australian author (born 1965)

- Born: 25 March 1965 (age 61); Sydney, New South Wales, Australia
- Occupation: Writer
- Writing career
- Period: 1992–present
- Genre: Young adult fiction
- Notable works: Looking for Alibrandi; Finnikin of the Rock; Saving Francesca; On the Jellicoe Road
- Notable awards: CBCA Children's Book of the Year Award: Older Readers
- Website: www.melinamarchetta.com.au

Carmelina Marchetta (born 25 March 1965) is an Australian writer and teacher. Marchetta is best known as the author of teen novels, Looking for Alibrandi, Saving Francesca and On the Jellicoe Road. She has twice been awarded the CBCA Children's Book of the Year Award: Older Readers, in 1993 and 2004. For Jellicoe Road she won the 2009 Michael L. Printz Award from the American Library Association, recognizing the year's best book for young adults.

== Education and early work ==
Melina Marchetta was born in Sydney on 25 March 1965. She is of Italian descent, a middle child with two sisters. Marchetta attended high school at Rosebank College in the Sydney suburb of Five Dock. She left school at age fifteen as she was not confident in her academic ability. She enrolled in a business school which helped her gain employment with the Commonwealth Bank and later at a travel agency. This gave her confidence to return to study and gain a teaching degree from the Australian Catholic University.

== Breakthrough: Looking for Alibrandi ==
Her first novel, Looking for Alibrandi was released in 1992 with a first print-run sellout within two months of its release. Published in 16 countries, including 11 translated editions, Looking for Alibrandi swept the pool of literary awards for young adult fiction in 1993 including the CBCA Children's Book of the Year Award: Older Readers. Dubbed "the most stolen library book", the novel has sold more than half a million copies worldwide and was followed by her film adaptation of the same title released in 2000, Looking for Alibrandi.

== Worldwide recognition: 2003–present ==
While writing the AFI award-winning screenplay Marchetta taught English, Italian and History full-time for ten years at a city high school for boys. During that time she released her second novel, Saving Francesca in 2003, followed by On the Jellicoe Road in 2006. Both novels have been published in more than 6 countries, with Saving Francesca translated into 4 languages. In its U.S. edition, Jellicoe Road won the 2009 Printz Award for "literary excellence in young adult literature".

Marchetta's fourth novel, the fantasy epic Finnikin of the Rock, was released by Penguin Australia in October 2008. It has since won the 2008 Aurealis Award for best young-adult novel and the 2009 ABIA (Australian Booksellers Industry Awards) Book of the Year for Older Children, and was shortlisted for the 2009 CBCA Children's Book of the Year Award: Older Readers. In the USA Finnikin has received starred reviews from Publishers Weekly, School Library Journal, Booklist and the Bulletin of the Center for Children's Books.

Marchetta has also written short stories including Twelve Minutes, part of the Books Alive anthology "10 Short Stories You Must Read This Year", along with reviews and opinion pieces for The Sydney Morning Herald, The Australian and the Australian Literary Review. She has been a writer-in-residence around the country, as far north as Thursday Island and as far south as Hobart.

Her fifth novel, The Piper's Son was released in Australia in 2010 and is an accompanying novel to Saving Francesca, but through the perspective of another character in the book.

She has been working on getting the Jellicoe Road movie script into production, while also working on writing the script for Saving Francesca. In 2016, she published Tell The Truth, Shame The Devil. Melina went on to collaborate with Kathryn Barker on a book When Rosie Met Jim/ Shoeboxes: Volume 22. In 2019, she released The Place on Dalhousie. Marchetta's most recent publications have been part of a junior fiction series entitled What Zola Did.

== Personal life ==
Marchetta lives in Sydney. Marchetta makes visits to schools to talk about her books. She also attends interviews, book signings, book club meetings at libraries and bookshops and gives talks to students about her novels.

== Awards and nominations ==
- Won – CBCA Children's Book of the Year Award: Older Readers for Looking for Alibrandi (1993)
- Won – Film Critics Circle of Australia, Best Screenplay – Adapted for Looking for Alibrandi (2000)
- Won – New South Wales Premier's Literary Awards, Script Writing Award for Looking for Alibrandi (2000)
- Won – Australian Film Institute Award, Best Adapted Screenplay for Looking for Alibrandi (2000)
- Won – BILBY Award: Older Readers winner for Looking for Alibrandi (2000)
- Shortlisted – South Australia Premier's Awards, Children's Literature Award for Saving Francesca (2004)
- Won – CBCA Children's Book of the Year Award: Older Readers for Saving Francesca (2004)
- Shortlisted – Australian Book Industry Awards (ABIA), Australian Book of the Year: Older Children for On the Jellicoe Road (2007)
- Shortlisted – Queensland Premier's Literary Awards, Best Young Adult Book for On the Road (2007)
- Won – Aurealis Award, Young Adult Division, Best Long Fiction for Finnikin of the Rock (2008)
- Won – Michael L. Printz Award for Excellence in Young Adult Literature for On the Jellicoe Road (2009)
- Shortlisted – New South Wales Premier's Literary Awards, Young Adult Book Award for The Piper's Son (2010)
- Shortlisted – New South Wales Premier's Literary Awards, Ethel Turner Prize for The Piper's Son (2010)
- Shortlisted – Prime Minister's Literary Awards, Young Adult Literature, for The Piper's Son (2011)
- Winner – New South Wales Premier's Literary Awards, Special Award

== Screenplay ==
Marchetta wrote the screenplay for the film Looking for Alibrandi (1999), a film starring Pia Miranda, Greta Scacchi and Anthony La Paglia. The film was a box office success, winning five awards including an AFI award and an Independent Film Award for best screenplay, as well as the NSW Premier's Literary Award and the Film Critics Circle of Australia Award.

In 2016, Marchetta announced on her blog she had completed the screenplay for a film adaptation of On the Jellicoe Road. In December 2019 Werner Film Productions, ZDF Enterprises and Wild Sheep Content announced an 8-part TV series. Marchetta will write the pilot with writers Samantha Strauss, Sarah Walker and Angela Betzien also attached.

== Selected works ==
- Looking for Alibrandi (1992), novel
- Looking for Alibrandi (1999), screenplay
- On the Jellicoe Road (2006); U.S. title, Jellicoe Road (2008)
- The Gorgon in the Gully: Pocket Money Puffins (September 2010)
- Tell the Truth, Shame the Devil (2016)
- When Rosie Met Jim/ Shoeboxes: Volume 22 (2017) with Kathryn Barker

=== Saving Francesca ===
- Saving Francesca (2003)
- The Piper's Son (March 2010)
- The Place on Dalhousie (2019)

=== The Lumatere Chronicles ===
- Finnikin of the Rock (2008)
- Froi of the Exiles (2011)
- Quintana of Charyn (2012)

=== What Zola Did (illustrated by Deb Hudson) ===
- What Zola Did on Monday (2020)
- What Zola Did on Tuesday (2020)
- What Zola Did on Wednesday (2020)
- What Zola Did on Thursday (2021)
- What Zola Did on Friday (2021)
- What Zola Did on Saturday (2021)
- What Zola Did on Sunday (2021)
- Zola and the Christmas Lights (2022)
