= Travelling Light (2003 film) =

- Directed by: Kathryn Millard
- Written by: Kathryn Millard
- Produced by: Helen Bowden
- Starring: Pia Miranda; Sacha Horler; Brett Stiller
- Cinematography: Tristan Milani
- Edited by: Stephen Evans
- Music by: Richard Vella
- Release date: 2003
- Country: Australia
- Language: English
- Box office: A$54,619 (Australia)

Travelling Light is a 2003 Australian film directed by Kathryn Millard and starring Pia Miranda, Sacha Horler, and Brett Stiller.

Horler won an Australian Film Institute award as Best Supporting Actress for her role in the film.

== Cast ==
- Pia Miranda as Leanne Ferris
- Sacha Horler as Bronwyn White
- Brett Stiller as Lou Bonetti
- Tim Draxl as Gary Wilkins
- Marshall Napier as Don Ferris
- Heather Mitchell as Betty Ferris
- Tamblyn Lord as Brian White
- Anna Torv as Debra Fowler
- Simon Burke as Ray Sugars

== Reception ==
Sandra Hall in the Sydney Morning Herald asks "So how can they still get the timing so wrong?" and writes "More eloquent is Millard's visual style. She and her cinematographer, Tristan Millani, use saturated colour and wide angles to suggest the sensation of being stranded in a landscape which goes on forever." It got 1 1/2 stars in the Herald Sun which said "You're scratching for something good to say about a movie when all you can commend it on is its camerawork." and that "Travelling Light is all head and no heart, a self-indulgent slab of artsy dithering concerned only with intellectualising a storyline that doesn't bear thinking about in the first place." The Daily Telegraph's Vicky Roach gave it 2 1/2 stars finishing "For a film about getting rid of unnecessary baggage, Travelling Light feels strangely unresolved." The Courier Mail's Des Partridge also gave it 2 1/2 stars. He writes "While it is a solidly made film, the characters and their problems have been ploughed over in so many Australian-made dramas that there's a lack of freshness."

== Awards ==
- 2003 Australian Film Institute Awards
  - Best Supporting Actress in Film – Sacha Horler – Won
  - Best Cinematography – Tristan Milani – Nominated
  - Best Original Music Score – Richard Vella – Nominated
  - Best Original Screenplay – Kathryn Millard – Nominated
