= Heroes' Mountain =

2002 film

- Directed by: Peter Andrikidis
- Written by: John Misto
- Produced by: Anthony Buckley
- Starring: Craig McLachlan; Tom Long
- Cinematography: Joseph Pickering
- Edited by: Neil Thumpston
- Music by: Mario Millo
- Release date: 2002
- Running time: 95 minutes
- Country: Australia
- Language: English

Heroes' Mountain is a 2002 Australian TV film about Stuart Diver, survivor of the 1997 Thredbo landslide, and the team that rescued him.

== Plot ==
Stuart Diver, the only survivor of the Thredbo landslide, is trapped in the rubble of a building. A rescue team led by Paul Featherstone free him.

== Cast ==
- Craig McLachlan - Stuart Diver
- Tom Long - Paul Featherstone
- Anthony Hayes - Woody
- Jodie Dry - Sally Diver
- Simon Burke - Euan Diver
- Joe Manning - Dave Brodie
- Nadine Garner - Federal Policewoman
- Andy Anderson - Peter Forbutt
- Andrew McFarlane - Mike Sodergren
- Tony Barry - Steve Diver
- Penne Hackforth-Jones - Annette Diver
- John Gregg - Andrew Donald
- Tina Bursill - Margy Donald
- Tiriel Mora - Mark Powderly

== Production ==
Heroes' Mountain was based on Diver's book Survival. Filming began in August 2001 Filming took place in Thredbo, a Sydney quarry and a studio in Sydney.

== Reception ==
''Heroes' Mountain rated well with 219,503 viewers and it was the ninth highest rated movie of the year.

Matt Buchanan of The Sydney Morning Herald gave it a positive review stating "Much of the considerable success of Heroes' Mountain lies in Andrikidis's and screenwriter John Misto's focusing on life and death at Thredbo in 1997." Brian Courtis of The Sun-Herald gave it 3 stars and the pick of the week saying "It is nail-biting, disaster-movie material and, with a line-up of some of Australia's more prominent actors in the heroic roles, that is the way it is treated."

== Awards ==
- 2002 AFI Awards
  - Best Mini-Series or Telefeature - nominated
  - Best Actor in a Supporting or Guest Role in a Television Drama - Tom Long - nominated
- 2003 Logie Awards
  - Most Outstanding Miniseries/Telemovie - nominated
