= Roxane Wilson =

South African actress (born 1965)

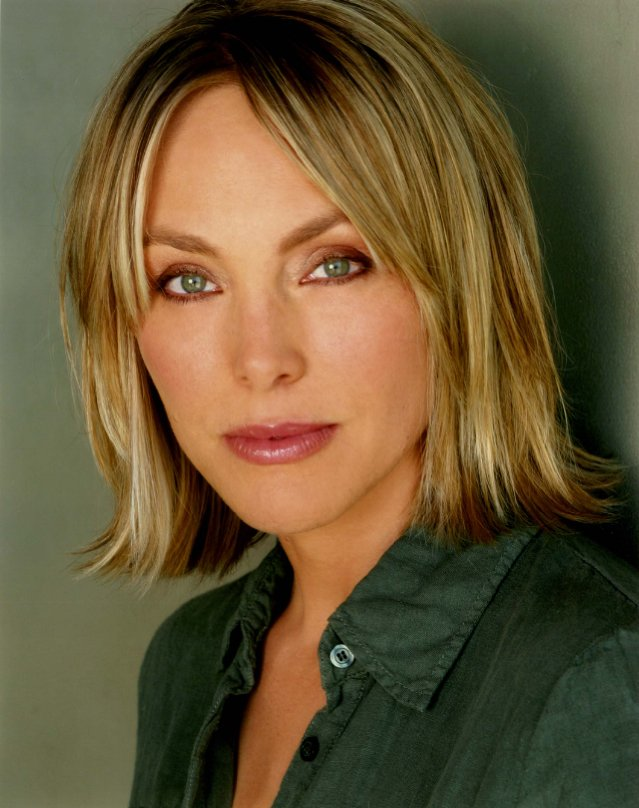
- Wilson in August 2010
- Born: 1965 (age 60–61); Durban, South Africa
- Education: Western Australian Academy of Performing Arts (1993)
- Occupation: Actress
- Years active: 1988–present
- Known for: Water Rats; Stingers; The Alice
- Spouse: Grant Bowler (m. 2001; div. 2011)
- Children: 2
- Website: www.roxanewilson.com

Roxane Wilson (born 1965) is a South African-born Australian actress best known for her roles in Water Rats, Stingers and The Alice. She was born in Durban, South Africa to an Italian mother and an English father. She lives in Los Angeles with her children.

== Early life ==
Wilson was born in Durban, South Africa in 1965, to an Italian mother and an English father. Her father was also an actor, who trained at the Old Vic in London.

In 1972, Roxane moved with her mother to Sydney, via London. Her stepfather is Ian 'Peewee' Wilson, leader and founding member of the Australian rock and roll band The Delltones.

After a couple of years in suburban Sydney, touring with the band, her family moved to Eungai Creek, New South Wales on the mid-north coast, where they maintained a fifty-acre farm, growing organic vegetables.

== Career ==
Wilson began her career at an early age with modelling. In 1981 she signed with the Chadwick Models agency in Sydney. She also joined the Rocks Players drama school, paying for her studies with earnings from modelling. In 1983 she relocated to New York for three years, where she signed with Wilhelmina Models and travelled the world modelling. During her time in New York she studied acting at HB Studio and the Meisner technique with Robert Modica.

On her return to Australia in 1990, Wilson began her career as a professional actress, playing the lead female role in the television series Family and Friends. In 1991 she relocated to Perth and furthered her craft by studying acting at Western Australian Academy of Performing Arts She graduated in 1993 with a Diploma of Performing Arts, before returning to Sydney, where she worked extensively in film, television and theatre.

She had leading stage roles in Noël Coward's Private Lives, Practical Mamet, Edward Albee's Finding the Sun and Freak Winds. She also had significant roles in the television series Water Rats, The Alice, and the film Punishment. She had a guest role Home and Away, and appeared in the films Doing Time for Patsy Cline (1997) alongside Miranda Otto, Paperback Hero (1999) with Hugh Jackman and independent film Black & White & Sex (2011).

In 2014 she appeared in the Australian Theatre Company's Los Angeles production of Holding the Man opposite Cameron Daddo, Adam J. Yeend and Nate Jones. The production was directed by Larry Moss and received strong critical praise.

She has also worked as a tutor and as a private acting coach at Screenwise and ATYP.

== Personal life ==
In 2001 Wilson married fellow actor Grant Bowler. They relocated to Los Angeles not long afterwards, to further their respective acting careers. Wilson became pregnant with their first child and subsequently focussed on being a full time mother to daughter Edie. During a return to Sydney in 2005, their son Ezekiel was born.

Wilson and Bowler divorced in 2011, and Wilson returned to Los Angeles with her children in 2012, where she now lives.

== Filmography ==
=== Film ===
Year	Title	Role	Notes
1989	Azzedene	Azzedene	Short film
1992	Loose Ends	Lee	Short film
1994	Shadow Chasing	Kate	Short film
1994	Spare Tires	Helen	Short film
1996	Three Months in Her Bathroom	Carmen	
1998	Reflections	Helen Stacey	
1997	The Final Squeak	The Girl Friend	Short film
1999	True Colours	Helen	Short film
1998	Erskineville Kings	Eve	
1999	The Heroes	Charlotte	Short film
1999	Change of Heart	Anne	
2000	The Day Neil Armstrong Walked on the Moon	Tracey	
2000	A Once Smiling Woman	Girl in Shop	Short film
2001	Lucky Blue	Angel	Short film
2007	Punishment	Marie Rogen	
2010	Mrs Wright	Mrs Wright	Short film
2011	Black and White and Sex	Angie 4	
2010	Emily	Jane	Short film
2010	Spirit-Ed	Mrs Jones	Short film
2015	Molly's Method	Molly Mayer	Short film
2015	Crushed	Sophie Rose	
2015	Brentwood Strangler	Sasha Green	Short film
2019	Dark Whispers: Volume 1	Hannah Wieldance	Anthology film

=== Television ===
Year	Title	Role	Type
1990	Family & Friends	Jennifer Chandler	TV series
1995	Echo Point	Coral O'Connor	130 episodes
1996	Police Rescue	Tessa	Season 5, episode 9: "The Only Constant"
1996	Common Law	Karen	
1997	Big Sky	Robbie Manning	Season 1, 13 episodes
1998	Wildside	Marilyn O'Connor	Season 1, episode 33
1998	Murder Call	Kristen Charlton	Season 2, episode 9: "Dead Fall"
1998–1999	Water Rats	Suzi Abramovich	Seasons 3–4, 6 episodes
1999	Beastmaster	Queen Atlantia	Season 1, episode 16: "A Devil's Deal"
2000–2002	Stingers	Daniella Mayo	Seasons 3–6, 69 episodes
2004	The Alice	Ellie Delaney	TV movie
2005–2006	The Alice	Ellie Delaney	Season 1, 22 episodes
2008	Outrageous Fortune	Candice Fletcher	Season 4, episode 8: "Guilty Creatures"
2008	Out of the Blue	Angela Mulroney	Season 1, 17 episodes
2009	Rescue: Special Ops	Chantelle Gregory	Season 1, 2 episodes
2010	Send in the Dogs	Narrator	
2010	City Homicide	Myra Rawlings	Season 4, episode 22: "Empowerment"
2011	Home and Away	Laura Carmody	16 episodes
2013	Wonderland	Kate	Season 1, episode 12: "Gary Marriage"
2020	Deadhouse Dark	Coach Iris Sloane	Season 1, episode 2: "No Pain No Gain"

== Stage ==
Year	Title	Role	Notes
1988	Suddenly Last Summer	Miss Holly	The Drama Studio, Sydney
1988	Territorial Rites	Genevieve	The Drama Studio, Sydney
1992	Just Genes	Performer	Also co-writer
1992	The Greeks	Helen of Troy	
1992	The Dining Room	8 characters	
1992	A Month in the Country	Natalia Petrovna	
1993	Red Noses	Mother Metz & others	
1993	A Dream Play	Keeper / Alice	
1993	Bumpy Angels	Blanche	Western Australian Academy of Performing Arts
1993	Lady Windermere's Fan	Lady Plymdale	Western Australian Academy of Performing Arts
1993	Bobbin' Up	Jeanie / Violet / Rita	Western Australian Academy of Performing Arts
1993	The Taming of the Shrew	Hortensio	
1994	Rosencrantz and Guilderstern Are Dead	Gertrude	
1994	Private Lives	Amanda Prynne	NSW tour
1998	Practical Mamet	Various	PAWA, Stables Theatre, Sydney
1999	Finding the Sun	Cordelia	Swell Productions
2000–2001	Freak Winds	Myra	Old Fitzroy Theatre, Sydney with Tamarama Rock Surfers
2014	Holding the Man	Mary-Gurt / Lois / Various	Matrix Theatre, Los Angeles with Australian Theatre Company
