= On the Jellicoe Road =

2006 novel by Melina Marchetta

- First edition
- Author: Melina Marchetta
- Language: English
- Genre: Young adult novel
- Publisher: Penguin Australia
- Publication date: 2006
- Publication place: Australia
- Media type: Print (hardback & paperback)
- Pages: 432 (hardcover); 290 (paperback)
- ISBN: 978-0-06-143183-8
- OCLC: 191931317
- Dewey Decimal: [Fic]
- LC Class: PZ7.M32855 Je 2008

On the Jellicoe Road is a young adult novel by Australian novelist Melina Marchetta. It was first published in Australia in 2006 by Penguin Australia under the title On the Jellicoe Road, where it was awarded the 2008 West Australia Young Readers Book (WAYRB) Award for Older Readers. It was later published in the United States in 2008 under the abbreviated title Jellicoe Road by HarperTeen and went on to win the 2009 Michael L. Printz Award from the American Library Association.

== Summary ==
The story is set around the life of Taylor Lily Markham, the 17-year-old leader of the boarding school on the Jellicoe Road (country NSW/ACT). Taylor was abandoned at the 7/11 on the Jellicoe Road by her mother when she was 11, and her only recollection of her father is a brief memory of sitting on her father's shoulders. The only adult influence in her life is her mentor/guardian Hannah, who lives in the unfinished house by the river, and writes stories about five kids who lived there in the 1980s and who has suddenly vanished into thin air at a time when Taylor really needs her.

To top all of Taylor’s problems off, there is a territory war going on between the boarders, the Townies (children from the Jellicoe Town), and the Cadets (Sydney boys who come for a six-week training exercise every year to Jellicoe). The leader of the cadets this year happens to be the boy whom Taylor ran away with when she was fourteen in search of her mother. The boy had previously betrayed her trust and Taylor never wished to see him again.

Running parallel to Taylor's story is the story that Hannah writes, about the five kids in the 1980s. As Hannah has not yet compiled it, the story is shown in pieces throughout the novel with her handwriting. In the American editions, it is shown with those chapters printed in a different font, while original edition shows Hannah's chapters in italics.

== Characters ==
Taylor Lily Markham Taylor is the 17-year-old leader of the boarders at Jellicoe School, which is located on the Jellicoe Road, 'where trees make breezy canopies like a tunnel to the Shangri-la', outside the fictional town of Jellicoe. (Located somewhere in rural New South Wales, north of Yass). Taylor was born in Sydney, but spent most of her childhood living on the streets with her mother and squatting from town to town. However her life changed when she was 11, and her mother dropped her off at the Seven-Eleven on the Jellicoe Road, and then drove away. Minutes later, a young woman named Hannah came and picked her up, and then took her to the Jellicoe School - and it's where Taylor's been ever since.

Taylor's character is difficult to imagine. The memories of her past have changed the person she is today. Most of the time she is lost in her own world, but she is prone to depression, anxiety, asthma and being unfriendly towards others. She has no idea who her father is and her only memory of him is standing on his shoulders and reaching for the sky. Taylor's appearance describes her as being tall for her age with light brown hair and blue/green eyes.

Jonah Griggs The leader of the Cadets from Sydney, Jonah is described as a 'ten foot tank.' He is tall, strong and attractive. He has had a violent childhood, from his father who used to verbally, physically and mentally abuse his mother, his younger brother Daniel and himself. When he was 14, Jonah's father was in one of his rages and so the young Jonah whacked him over the head with a cricket bat, which ultimately caused his father's death. Jonah, who was traumatised by this act, attempted to commit suicide by jumping in front of a train, but, on the day he planned it, he met Taylor and he decided he didn't want to kill himself in front of her, due to the fact that Taylor had already witnessed a suicide. So instead he catches the train with her, and they travel to Yass. Once they get off, they attempt to hitchhike with a postman to Sydney where Taylor's mother is supposed to be, but Jonah has a dream from his dead father saying 'if you go any further, you won't come back.' (although it is strongly hinted later that the postman they rode with was the serial killer that is frequently referenced in the novel by Taylor's younger classmates) So that night, Jonah rings his school, and the next day the Brigadier shows up and takes them both back to Jellicoe. Taylor sees this act as a great betrayal, and she refuses to speak to Jonah again.

Chaz Santangelo The incredibly good looking Italian/Aboriginal leader of the Townies (townsfolk of Jellicoe), Chaz is the son of the Chief of Police, Sal and the Mayor, Clara. He is the eldest child and only son, with four younger female siblings - Mary, Elisha, Tilly and Sarah Santangelo who often drive him insane. He's a sentimental, wise and fair person, who eventually becomes good friends with Taylor and Jonah, and continues to have a highly complicated relationship with Raffy, his childhood friend and complicated love interest. They both attended Jellicoe Primary school, where they were obviously close. Raffy and Chaz's families are also very close, with him once breaking into the school because Raffy's mother left her teacher's chronicle there.

Raffy was born a Townie, and has parents who live there, but attends the Jellicoe School. Her parents are teachers in the town of Jellicoe and she went to Primary School with Chaz Santangelo. She was his best friend there, and even his romantic interest. Both their families are good friends. She seems to know the moves of the Townies and often uses her past relationship with Chaz to Jellicoe school's advantage. Raffy is considered to be a traitor by Chaz and the Townies for attending Jellicoe School. She was an outsider at Jellicoe School in her younger years, along with Taylor and Ben, the Violinist. As she progresses to the senior year levels, she becomes more popular, and looks after the younger levels, mothering them. This mothering also comes into play with her friendship with Taylor. She has long brown hair and is mentioned to be religious several times, although not of the common sense.

== Adaptation ==
In 2013, Screen Australia announced development funding to support Marchetta in adapting On the Jellicoe Road for the screen. At the time, Sue Taylor and Rosemary Blight were producing and Kate Woods was attached to direct. In 2016, Marchetta announced on her blog she had completed the screenplay for a film adaptation but new producers had come on board. In December 2019, Werner Film Productions, ZDF Enterprises, and Wild Sheep Content announced an 8-part TV series. Marchetta will write the pilot with writers Samantha Strauss, Sarah Walker, and Angela Betzien also attached.
