= Risk (2001 film) =

- Theatrical film poster
- Directed by: Alan White
- Written by: John Armstrong
- Based on: The Adjuster by Tracy Kidder
- Produced by: Marian Macgowan
- Starring: Tom Long; Bryan Brown; Claudia Karvan
- Cinematography: Simon Duggan
- Edited by: Lee Smith
- Music by: Don Miller-Robinson
- Release date: 10 May 2001
- Running time: 93 minutes
- Country: Australia
- Language: English
- Box office: A$460,760 (Australia)

Risk is a 2001 Australian film about insurance fraud directed by Alan White and starring Tom Long, Bryan Brown, and Claudia Karvan. The film is based on the story The Adjuster by Tracy Kidder.

== Plot synopsis ==
John Kriesky (Bryan Brown) is a veteran insurance investigator who is tempted towards the wrong side of the law. With the help of an amateur con man Ben (Tom Long), John hatches a scheme to substantiate false claims by taking part of several questionable claims his firm has settled for a fraction of what they're usually worth. John and Ben get help in their illegal business by lawyer Louise (Claudia Karvan), who has a cocaine addiction and is John's lover. But when Louise becomes involved with Ben and demands a bigger cut of the money, their shaky confidence game begins to fall apart.

== Cast ==
- Tom Long as Ben Madigan
- Claudia Karvan as Louise Roncoli
- Melissa Madden Gray as Colleen
- Bryan Brown as John Kriesky
- Jason Clarke as Chris
- Bob Baines as Grayson
- Sharin Contini as Mrs. Whelan
- Thomas Clunie as Mr. Whelan
- Brian Meegan as Instructor
- Kim Lewis a Child’s Mother
- Michael Denkha as hospital husband
- Alan David Lee as Young Auditor

== Reception ==
Risk was met with positive reviews from critics and audiences, earning an 80% approval rating on Rotten Tomatoes.

Scott Weinberg of Apollo Guide gave a positive reviews, commenting "Risk may not be the most unique crime drama to come down the pike, but it's certainly intriguing and polished enough to earn a look."

Jason Gorber of Film Scouts gave a negative review, calling it "a straight ahead, uneventful movie. Boring in parts, the film tries to work as a slick Indie feature but seems like a tired Hollywood film."

=== Accolades ===
Bryan Brown was nominated for Best Supporting Actor at the FCCA Awards.
