= Brett Stiller =

Australian actor

- Occupation: Actor
- Notable work: Garage Days; The Alice; Travelling Light

Brett Stiller is an Australian actor.

Featured roles he played include Joe in Garage Days, Toby Delaney in The Alice and its spinoff series, Glenn Abbott in The Postcard Bandit, and Lou in Travelling Light and he had a run on All Saints

Stage roles Stiller featured in include Oresteia (The Sydney Theatre Company, 2010), Accidental Death of an Anarchist (The Sydney Theatre Company, 2010), The Mysteries: Genesis (The Sydney Theatre Company, 2009), Holding the Man (Griffin Theatre Company, 2006), Strangers in Between (Griffin Theatre Company, 2005), The Miser (The Sydney Theatre Company, 2004), Bash (Glen St Theatre, 2003) and Borderlines (The Stables, 2001)

Stiller was a member of the Australian Theatre for Young People, studied drama for his HSC at Hunters Hill High School and graduated from Nepean University with a degree in performing arts.
