= Caught (2023 TV series) =

Australian television hostage comedy series

- Also known as: C*A*U*G*H*T
- Genre: Comedy
- Created by: Kick Gurry
- Written by: Kick Gurry
- Directed by: Kick Gurry
- Starring: Ben O'Toole; Kick Gurry; Alexander England; Matthew Fox; Lincoln Younes; Fayssal Bazzi
- Music by: Richard Breakspear
- Country of origin: Australia
- Original language: English
- No. of series: 1
- No. of episodes: 6

Production
- Executive producers: Sean Penn; Cailah Scobie; Andrew Mann; Silvio Salom; Amanda Duthie
- Producers: Kick Gurry; Brendan Donoghue; John Schwarz; Michael Schwarz
- Cinematography: Alex Dufficy
- Camera setup: Multi-camera
- Running time: 30 minutes
- Production companies: Deep Water Films; Little Bird Films; Fremantle Media

Original release
- Network: Stan
- Release: 28 September 2023

Caught (stylised as C*A*U*G*H*T) is an Australian television comedy series for Stan, released on 28 September 2023. Produced and directed by Kick Gurry, the series follows four Australian soldiers trapped after a secret mission to Behati-Prinsloo they are mistaken for Americans spies with no way home after their government abandons them, the men take it upon themselves to make the ultimate hostage video for the public.

== Plot ==
Four Australian soldiers Rowdy (Ben O'Toole), Dylan (Kick Gurry), Albahnis (Lincoln Younes) and Phil Choi (Alexander England) are trapped during a secret mission to war-torn Behati-Prinsloo when they are captured by the island's Director Bustard (Fayssal Bazzi) and are mistaken for enemy spies. When they realise the government has no interest in saving them they take it upon themselves to create the ultimate hostage video for the public. With the media back home in Australia watching every single video, the boys realise that this may have been the best thing to have happened to them.

== Cast and characters ==
=== Main ===
- Ben O'Toole as Rowdy Gaines
- Kick Gurry as Dylan Fox
- Alexander England as Phil Choi
- Lincoln Younes as Albahnis
- Fayssal Bazzi as Director Bustard
- Rebecca Breeds as Josie Justice
- Bella Heathcote as Jemima Justice
- Matthew Fox as Lieutenant Pete
- Bryan Brown as Warren Whistle
- Erik Thomson as Colonel Bishop
- Jessica Napier as Tania Towers
- Rob Carlton as Tony Barber

=== Guests ===
- Daniel Webber as Jason

=== Cameos ===
- Sean Penn as Himself
- Karl Stefanovic as Himself
- Allison Langdon as Herself
- Susan Sarandon as Alaska Adams
- Silvia Colloca as Princess Depinder
- Travis Fimmel as The Dingo

== Production ==
The series was filmed in different locations around Sydney and at Fox Studios.

== Episodes ==
| Episode | Title | Date | Ref |
|---|---|---|---|
| 1 | "Everyone Loves Australians" | 27 September 2023 | |
| 2 | "Blue Check Mark" | 27 September 2023 | |
| 3 | "Content" | 27 September 2023 | |
| 4 | "Cancelled" | 27 September 2023 | |
| 5 | "The Greatest Show, Man" | 27 September 2023 | |
| 6 | "Deep Fake" | 27 September 2023 | |

== Reception ==
ITVX in the UK had secured the rights for C*A*U*G*H*T in 2023 but before it was set to be released in the UK it had been delayed by ITVX. C*A*U*G*H*T aired from 13 June 2024.

The series was pulled from international release In October 2023 due to sensitivities around the Gaza war, as it was due to be shown at MIPCOM.

David Knox of TV Tonight gave the series 3 out of 5 stars. Stephen Russell of ScreenHub gave the series 2 out of 5 stars, Russell criticized the subplots and the stereotypes that were present.

== Accolades ==
| Year | Award | Category | Nominees | Result | Ref |
|---|---|---|---|---|---|
| 2024 | TV Week Silver Logie Award | Best Lead Actor in a Comedy | Lincoln Younes | Nominated | |
