= Do or Die (miniseries) =

2001 British Australian mini series

- Written by: Christopher Lee
- Directed by: Rowan Woods
- Starring: Kate Ashfield; Tom Long; William McInnes
- Music by: Edmund Butt
- Countries of origin: Australia; United Kingdom
- Original language: English

Production
- Producers: John Edwards; Lavinia Warner
- Cinematography: Martin McGrath
- Editor: Shawn Seet
- Running time: 240 minutes

Original release
- Release: 22 April – 29 April 2001

Do or Die is a 2001 British Australian TV mini-series that was broadcast in England in April 2001 and in Australia in July 2001.

== Plot ==
When Samantha's 6 years old son is diagnosed with leukemia and neither parent is compatible to be a donor, she has to confess to her husband that he's not his biological father. She returns to Australia to find her sick son's biological father in order to be a medulla donor. Michael is a notorious criminal and has spent the last 7 years since last saw Sam in jail for armed robbery. The two reunite and old feelings might not be as forgotten as Sam thought.

== Cast ==
- Kate Ashfield as Samantha
- Tom Long as Michael Tyler
- Hugo Speer as Nicholas
- William McInnes as Daryl Quint
- Patsy Palmer as Claire
- Martin Sacks as Jimmy Grattan
- Ditch Davey as Slipper

== Production ==
The mini-series is a coproduction between Australia's Seven Network and Britain's BSkyB.

== Reception ==
Do or Die's first episode was beaten in the ratings by A Perfect Murder and then the second episode was beaten by coverage of the Wimbledon men's final.

Writing in the Age Debi Enker says "It's easy to focus on the men in Do or Die, for even though it starts out as a mother-and-son story, the drama rapidly develops into a battle of wits involving three cunning and determined men who go to war, with a woman and a sick child between them. The sting in the tale is that, as the representative of law and order, Quint is so dislikeable that you find yourself barracking for the alleged bad guy." Kerrie Murphy of The Australian wrote "apart from the occasional lull in plot, Do or Die is well written. There are some genuine moments of intrigue and, for the most part, you don't see the answer coming, or if you do it's not until the last minute." The Chronicle Herald's Pat Lee wrote that it "is not much above a soap opera, but it's a fun one with all the elements in place."

== Awards ==
- 2001 AFI Awards
  - Open Craft Award - Shawn Seet, for Editing - won
  - Best Mini-Series or Telefeature - nominated
  - Best Direction in a Television Drama - Rowan Woods - nominated
