= Luke Carroll =

Australian actor (born 1982)

- Born: 1982 (age 43–44); Sydney, New South Wales, Australia
- Education: Marcellin College Randwick (1996)
- Occupation: Actor
- Years active: 1991–present
- Known for: Australian Rules (2002); The Alice (2005); Play School
- Children: 2

Luke Carroll is an Australian stage, television, and film actor. He is known for his role in the television drama The Alice (2005), and as a host of the children's program Play School.

== Early life and education ==
Luke Carroll was born in Sydney in 1982 and is an Aboriginal Australian man of the Wiradjuri and Ngunnawal peoples. He grew up in the inner-city suburb of Woolloomooloo, in a single-parent household. His mother, Faye was a kinship carer and worked in education for more than 30 years, as an Aboriginal education aid in Sydney primary and secondary schools. He has a brother Darren who is eight years older. Rarely seeing his father, Carroll somewhat regarded his brother as a father figure.

Carroll's maternal grandfather was African American and met his grandmother when he was based out of Sydney with the U.S. Navy for three years from 1941. He died when Carroll's mother was two, when his ship was bombed by the Japanese after being posted to the Philippines.

Considered the 'class clown' at primary school, Carroll got the attention of his year three relief teacher, who connected him with an acting agent in North Bondi. Prior to this, he had never considered becoming an actor, with his interests aligning closer with sport. But when the opportunity to act arose, he ran with it, with enthusiastic support from his mother.

Carroll then attended high school at Marcellin College Randwick, where, after his initial few acting roles as a child, he focussed on his studies, while acting in television commercials and undertaking catalogue modelling work for Best & Less and David Jones. He completed high school in 1996, and toying with the idea of becoming a dentist, undertook work experience at an Aboriginal medical service in the suburb of Redfern and then worked as a postman, before ultimately deciding to rekindle his acting career.

== Career ==
=== Television and film ===
Carroll got his start on television in 1991, at the age of nine, with a guest appearance in The Flying Doctors as the younger brother of Ernie Dingo's character, followed by a role in ABC children's series Lift Off!, as Paul Jordan – the eldest child and step-brother to Aku.

He then had a recurring role as Jason Sutton in ABC drama miniseries Heartland in 1994, alongside Ernie Dingo and Cate Blanchett. In 1999, he also had a recurring role in Heartbreak High, playing the character of Mo. He had guest roles in several other Australian series, including The Flying Doctors, The Man from Snowy River, G.P., Ocean Girl, All Saints and Water Rats.

Carroll then landed his break with a leading role as Dumby Red, opposite Nathan Phillips in the 2002 football drama film Australian Rules. His portrayal saw him nominated for an AFI Award for Best Supporting Actor. The same year, he had a lead role in short film Free, winning the POV competition award for Best Actor in 2003.

Regular television drama roles began to come Carroll's way, including The Alice (2005), in which he played the role of Michael Anderson and the miniseries RAN (2006), appearing as Paul Gabui. In 2007, he co-presented (together with Cathy Freeman) Going Bush, a documentary travel show for SBS Television, taking over from Deborah Mailman, after she vacated the hosting position to have her first child. That same year, Carroll had a recurring role as intern doctor Lewis Rigg, in long-running soap opera Home and Away.

Carroll appeared opposite Rose Byrne and Hugo Weaving in 2008 film The Tender Hook, playing the role of Alby O'Shea. The film was renamed The Boxer and the Bombshell for the American market. Also in 2008, Carroll hosted annual indigenous awards ceremony The Deadlys, for SBS. He co-hosted the awards again in 2010, with singer Naomi Wenitong, and once more in 2013, with singer Casey Donovan.

In 2009, Carroll had a starring role as Eddie in the Aboriginal stoner comedy film Stone Bros., earning a 2009 Deadly Award for Male Actor of the Year. That same year, he also appeared in comedy drama film Subdivision, opposite Brooke Satchwell, Gary Sweet and Steve Bisley. The following year, he portrayed Nelson in horror film Needle, alongside Michael Dorman, Travis Fimmel and Ben Mendelsohn.

In 2010, Carroll began a long-running presenting role with children's television series Play School, appearing alongside Teo Gebert in his first episode. He marked 16 years with the series in 2026.

Carroll had a major guest role in an episode of indigenous drama series Redfern Now in 2012, which saw him nominated for an Best Guest or Supporting Actor in a Television Drama. His portrayal also won him a 2013 Deadly Award for Male Actor of the Year. He then had a recurring role as Wayne in drama miniseries The Gods of Wheat Street in 2014, before playing a minor part in drama suspense film Strangerland, opposite Nicole Kidman and Joseph Fiennes, the following year.

Between 2016 and 2020, Carroll made numerous guest appearances in comedy sketch series Black Comedy. During this period he also played Archie in 2018 period drama film The Nightingale,

In 2022, Carroll played two recurring roles in Grey Nomads and MaveriX, before landing the role of Tim Billiberliary in big budget Disney+ series The Artful Dodger in 2023. The series serves as a follow up to Oliver Twist, but set in 1850s Australia. He reprised the role in the second season in 2025. Carroll also had a recurring role as Jonny in Mystery Road: Origin, the 2025 second season of Mystery Road, which saw him nominated for an AACTA Award for Best Guest or Supporting Actor in a Television Drama. He was named as part of the cast for the second season of Scrublands, going on to play the part of Scotty Waaliti. In June 2025, he was named in the cast for ABC drama miniseries Goolagong. The biopic, chronicling the career of tennis champion Evonne Goolagong Cawley premiered in January 2026, with Carroll in the role of Kenny Goolagong.

Carroll is also part of the presenting team of Channel Seven's Sydney Weekender. He has also appeared in an Australian Government advertisement about being "Climate Clever", as well as advertisements for Colgate and Nestle Quik.

=== Stage ===
Carroll has made many appearances in theatre, including a 2013 Yirra Yaakin / Belvoir production of Bob Merritt's 1975 play The Cake Man, about Aboriginal life on a mission. His role as Sweet William saw him nominated for a 2014 Helpmann Awards for Best Male Actor in a Play.

In 2018 and 2019, Carroll toured with Nakkiah Lui's Black is the New White. His role as the Curator in a 2020 production of Black Cockatoo for Sydney's Ensemble Theatre earned him a BroadwayWorld Sydney Award for Best Professional Actor in a Play.

In 2022, Carroll played a lead role in the Belvoir production of Nathan Maynard's play At What Cost?. The play had its world premiere at the Belvoir in Sydney, then toured to Adelaide in June, presented by the State Theatre Company of South Australia, before going on to Hobart.

== Awards and recognition ==
Year	Work	Award	Category	Result	Ref.
2002	Australian Rules	AFI Awards	Best Actor in a Supporting Role	Nominated	
2002	Australian Rules	Film Critics Cicle Awards	Best Supporting Actor	Nominated	
2003	Free	POV competition	Best Actor	Won	
2005	The Alice	The Deadly Awards	Male Actor of the Year	Nominated	
2006	RAN	AFI Awards	Best Guest or Supporting Actor in Television Drama	Nominated	
2008	Luke Carroll	Bob Maza Fellowship	Emerging Acting Talent	Awarded	
2009	Stone Bros.	Deadly Awards	Male Actor of the Year	Won	
2013	Redfern Now	Deadly Awards	Male Actor of the Year	Won	
2013	Redfern Now (episode 6: "Pretty Boy Blue")	AACTA Awards	Best Guest or Supporting Actor in a Television Drama	Nominated	
2014	The Cake Man	Helpmann Awards	Best Male Actor in a Play	Nominated	
2020	Black Cockatoo	BroadwayWorld Sydney Awards	Best Actor in a Play – Professional	Nominated	
2024	The Artful Dodger	Equity Ensemble Awards	Outstanding Performance by an Ensemble in a Drama Series	Nominated	
2026	Mystery Road: Origin	AACTA Awards	Best Supporting Actor in a Drama	Nominated	

== Other activities ==
As of April 2024, Carroll is ambassador for Education, Action & Change, a resource pack for schools, at Reconciliation SA. He is also an ambassador for the Cathy Freeman Foundation and My Forever Family NSW, and has had a long association with medical organisation, Malpa.

In 2022, Carroll joined Officeworks and the Australian Literacy and Numeracy Foundation (ANLF), in supporting their annual appeal to help close the literacy gap for First Nations, refugee and other vulnerable Australian children across Australia, via community-led literacy and language programs.

== Personal life ==
Carroll is a supporter of rugby league club the South Sydney Rabbitohs.

Carroll has two sons, the youngest of whom, he had together with his partner, Danica Sarno, and was the first baby born in Sydney in 2014. He had his oldest son with his first girlfriend, thirteen years earlier, when he was 22. Carroll also has two stepdaughters.

== Filmography ==
=== Film ===
Year	Title	Role	Type	Ref.
1994	Dallas Doll	Boy	Feature film	
1998	Tears	Vaughn	Short film	
2002	Australian Rules	Dumby Red	Feature film	
2002	Free		Short film	
2004	The New Boots	De Lisle	Short film	
2008	The Tender Hook	Alby "Othello" O'Shea	Feature film	
2009	Stone Bros.	Eddie	Feature film	
2009	Subdivision		Feature film	
2010	Needle	Nelson	Feature film	
2010	The Biggest Port	Lukie SweetHeat	Short film	
2015	Strangerland	Darrell	Feature film	
2018	The Nightingale	Archie	Feature film	
2019	Twelfth Round		Short film	
2025	Lickerish	Anthony		

=== Television ===
Year	Title	Role	Type	Ref.
1991	The Flying Doctors	Cameron	1 episode	
1992	Lift Off	Paul Jordan	3 episodes	
1992	Lift Off: The Story of E.C	Paul Jordan	TV special	
1992	Six Pack	Felix	1 episode	
1993; 2007	Home and Away	Lewis Rigg / Buyer No.1	12 episodes	
1994	G.P.	Tony Thompson	2 episodes	
1994	Heartland	Jason Sutton	Miniseries, 8 episodes	
1994	Sky Trackers	Simon Tjapiljari	1 episode	
1995	Snowy River: The McGregor Saga	Sam Murray	1 episode	
1996	Naked: Stories of Men	Buddy	1 episode	
1997	Ocean Girl	Bobby	1 episode	
1997	Fallen Angels	Chris	1 episode	
1999	All Saints	Seb	1 episode	
1999	Water Rats	Courier	1 episode	
1999	Heartbreak High	Mo	6 episodes	
2003	Stingers	Alan Kelly	1 episode	
2004	The Alice	Michael Anderson	TV movie	
2005	The Alice	Michael Anderson	22 episodes	
2006	RAN	Paul Gaibui	Miniseries, 6 episodes	
2007	Going Bush	Co-host (with Cathy Freeman)		
2009	Heartbeat	Nev	2 episodes	
2010–2026	Play School	Host	60 episodes	
2012	Redfern Now	Lenny Brewster	1 episode	
2012	Woollo	Chris Olsen	TV movie	
2014	The Gods of Wheat Street	Wayne	3 episodes	
2016–2020	Black Comedy	Uncle Dave / various	6 episodes	
2019	Total Control	Rob	1 episode	
2019	Upright	Constable Brett	1 episode	
2020–2024	Sydney Weekender	Presenter	6 episodes	
2021	Preppers	Quincy	1 episode	
2022	Grey Nomads	Yarran Charles	6 episodes	
2022	MaveriX	Murray Peterson	6 episodes	
2022	Significant Others	Ian	Miniseries, 1 episode	
2023–2026	The Artful Dodger	Tim Billiberliary	16 episodes	
2024	BlakBall	Various		
2025	Mystery Road: Origin	Jonny	6 episodes	
2025	Scrublands: Silver	Scotty Waaliti	4 episodes	
2026	Goolagong	Kenny Goolagong	Miniseries, 3 episodes	

== Theatre ==
Year	Title	Role	Theatre	Ref.
2001–2002	The Cherry Pickers	Lead	Wharf Theatre, Sydney with STC & UK tour	
2002	The Dreamers	Shane Wallich	Belvoir, Sydney	
2002	No Sugar	Juvenile Lead	Belvoir, Sydney	
2002	Purple Dreams	Support role	Judith Wright Arts Centre, Brisbane	
2002	My Girragundji	Lead	Australian tour with Bell Shakespeare	
2003	Conversations with the Dead	Lead	Belvoir, Sydney	
2004	A Midsummer Night's Dream	Puck	Belvoir, Sydney	
2004	Eora Crossing	Lead	Museum of Sydney	
2004	Riverland	Lead	Adelaide Festival	
2006	Capricornia	Norman	York Theatre, Sydney	
2013	Mother Courage and Her Children	Eilif	Playhouse, Brisbane	
2013	The Cake Man	Sweet William	Studio Underground Perth, Belvoir, Sydney with Yirra Yaakin	
2014	20 Questions		Belvoir, Sydney	
2014–2015	Black Diggers	Indigenous soldier	Australian tour	
2015	The Wind in the Willows	Ratty / Mole / Badger / Toad	Roundhouse Theatre, Brisbane with La Boite	
2015	Battle of Waterloo	Ray	Wharf Theatre, Sydney with STC	
2016	The Hanging	Detective Flint	Wharf Theatre, Sydney with STC	
2017	The Season	Ritchie Duncan	Sydney Opera House, Theatre Royal, Hobart, Malthouse Theatre, Melbourne	
2017–2018	Black is the New White	Narrator	Australian tour with STC	
2018	The Harp in the South	Various	STC	
2019	The Torrents	Kingsley Myers	Black Swan Theatre Co	
2020	Black Cockatoo	Curator	Ensemble Theatre, Sydney	
2021–2023	Sunshine Super Girl	Larry	Australian tour	
2022	At What Cost?	Boyd Mansell	Belvoir, Sydney	
2023	The Visitors	Gordon	Sydney Opera House & NSW tour	
