= Family and Friends =

- Genre: Soap opera
- Created by: Alan Bateman
- Written by: Bevan Lee; Greg Haddrick
- Starring: Roxane Wilson; Renato Bartolomei; Jonathan Hardy; Dinah Shearing; Rachael Beck; Simon Westaway; Ross Newton; Sean Myers
- Country of origin: Australia
- Original language: English
- No. of seasons: 1
- No. of episodes: 96

Production
- Executive producer: Alan Bateman
- Producer: Bruce Best
- Running time: 30 minutes
- Budget: $2 million

Original release
- Network: Nine Network
- Release: 7 February – 27 December 1990

Family and Friends is a short-lived Australian television soap opera by the Nine Network which debuted on 7 February 1990 and aired for a single season until 27 December.

The series was intended to be the networks response to the already successful soaps on the rival channels - Neighbours and E Street on Network Ten and Home and Away on the Seven Network.

== Synopsis ==
Family and Friends is set in a suburban community and the series focuses on two families – the Chandlers and the Italian-Australian Rossis – who are linked by a long-standing vendetta stemming from an accidental death in the 1950s. Old enmities were renewed by the Romeo and Juliet style romance between Jennifer Chandler (Roxane Wilson) and Robert Rossi (Renato Bartolomei).

== Production ==
After the Nine Network lured the creative team of Alan Bateman, John Holmes and Bevan Lee away from Seven Network's Home and Away, Bateman came up with the idea for the show, which would explore the cultural differences between an Australian family and an Italian family. The show was initially titled The Family, then A Family Matter, before becoming Family and Friends. Holmes was to development produce, while Lee would script edit. Lee told the writers that the premise should be a Romeo and Juliet story, but not to tell anyone as audiences where bored of that story. However, Nine's publicity department ran with the concept and began promoting the show as a "Romeo and Juliet for the 90s". The show had a $2 million budget and launched on 7 February 1990.

Despite the strong cast of which included actors known for previous soap roles including: Anne Phelan as Myra Desmond and Maxine Klibingaitis, Justine Clarke, Abigail and Alyce Platt, the series failed to catch on with the viewers. Episodes were initially broadcast in one-hour instalments up against Ten's E Street on Wednesdays and Thursdays at 19:30–20:30, but ratings were poor. The show was promptly reformatted as half-hour episodes stripped at 17:30 weeknights, but ratings remained very low. And now that it was lead-in to National Nine News's 6pm bulletin its low ratings meant it remained in a precarious position.

The series then underwent a major revamp which included the loss of six cast members and addition of new cast members including Rebecca Rigg. A week's worth of episodes were produced in the new format, when the series was abruptly cancelled on 26 April 1990. The final episodes went to air in a late-night timeslot during the 1990–1991 summer non-ratings period. In total 96 episodes had been produced.

== Cast ==
- Abigail - Doreen Stubbs
- Renato Bartolomei - Robert Rossi
- Rachael Beck - Claudia Rossi
- Justine Clarke - Cheryl Brooks
- Diane Craig - Pamela Chandler
- Robert Forza - Joe Rossi
- Jonathan Hardy - Brother Ignatius
- Gavin Harrison - Renato
- Maxine Klibingaitis - Gloria Stubbs
- Adrian Lee - Marco Rossi
- Dominic McDonald - Greg Chandler
- Anna-Maria Monticelli - Luciana Rossi
- Sean Myers - Greg Chandler
- Ross Newton - Bartholomew Purvis (Thommo)
- Anne Phelan - Dawn Rossi
- Alyce Platt - Stephanie Collins
- Rebecca Rigg - Pasquelina
- Mario Rossello - Mikey Rossi
- Dinah Shearing - Antoinetta Rossi
- Wendy Strehlow - Janet Simmonds
- Simon Westaway - Damien Chandler
- Kym Wilson - Blondie
- Roxane Wilson - Jennifer Chandler
- Teo Gebert – Jak

== Reception ==
The opening episode attracted a low eight rating points, before dropping down to four. Barbara Hooks from The Age said the show "makes a promising debut", but criticised the ending, writing "the episode ends in the worst-kept cliff hanger in the history of Australian TV when the lovers fall down a well." Hooks enjoyed Shearing's character, calling her "a right old bitch made bitter and twisted by the past". She also praised Craig and Monticelli and observed that the female characters carry the first episode, while the male characters "came across as wooden when intended to play it stiff and stand-offish." Hooks thought the episode had "clumsy exposition and rough dialogue" and she preferred "more subtlety of execution", but hoped viewers thought the show had "sufficient saving graces".

After viewing a few episodes, Robin Oliver of The Sydney Morning Herald said Family and Friends had "a solid and very narrowly focused start – and one of two disappointingly wooden performances". Oliver praised Craig, McDonald, Shearing, Hardy and Phelan for their performances. He also stated "Above all, Family and Friends looks good on the screen. It may only be soap, but soap makes the world go round. Judged by episodes three through to six, Nine is on target after a long run of outs. Here is a hit."

Robert Fidgeon of the Herald Sun called Family and Friends one of "Australia's All-time Top 50 TV Turkeys", and stated "Expensive, modern-day Romeo and Juliet soapie stinker. Nine commissioned 90 one-hour episodes, but axed it after 11 weeks."
