= Tom Long (actor) =

Australian actor (1968–2020)

- Born: Thomas Andrew Long; 3 August 1968; Boston, Massachusetts, U.S.
- Died: 4 January 2020 (aged 51)
- Education: National Institute of Dramatic Art
- Occupations: Film and television actor
- Years active: 1992–2012
- Spouse: Rebecca Fleming (m. 2019)
- Partner: Rachael Maza
- Children: 1

Thomas Andrew Long (3 August 1968 – 4 January 2020) was an Australian film and television actor. He played court official and avid surfer Angus in the late 1990s TV series SeaChange and Brenden Abbott in the 2003 Australian TV movie The Postcard Bandit.

== Early life ==
Long was born on 3 August 1968 in Boston, Massachusetts, as his Australian parents were visiting there at the time. On their return to Australia he grew up on a farm near Benalla, Victoria. He worked as a jackaroo and shearer after attending Geelong Grammar School, before going abroad, travelling to India, the United Kingdom, Los Angeles, and South Carolina.

After returning to Australia, Long successfully auditioned for a place at the National Institute of Dramatic Art, graduating in 1994.

== Career ==
Long appeared in several Australian television series, most notably the Australian Broadcasting Corporation (ABC) hit SeaChange (1998–2000) and the Nine Network police drama Young Lions (2002). He appeared in the Australian films Two Hands (1999) and The Dish (2000). Long played Brenden Abbott in the 2003 telemovie The Postcard Bandit and appeared in the film The Book of Revelation.

He also appeared in The Last of the Ryans, Doing Time for Patsy Cline, Do or Die, Risk, Heroes' Mountain: The Thredbo Story, Black Jack: Ghosts, Joanne Lees: Murder in the Outback, and East of Everything, and Woodley.

Long stopped acting after he collapsed on stage during a performance of the play Coranderrk: We Will Show the Country at the Sydney Opera House in July 2012.

== Personal life ==
Long was in a long-term relationship with actress Rachael Maza, breaking up in 1998 just before the birth of their son, Ariel. The couple reunited in 2005, after Maza and Ariel survived a deadly car accident, albeit with serious injuries.

Long married Rebecca Fleming in February 2019.

Long was diagnosed in 2012 with multiple myeloma, an incurable blood cancer. He underwent chemotherapy and received a stem cell transplant to treat the disease. In December 2018, Long was given an updated prognosis of 3–12 months to live. In March 2019, Long travelled to Seattle, Washington, to undergo a medical trial, after which he was pronounced "cancer free".

On 4 January 2020, Long died of encephalitis at age 51.

== Filmography ==
=== Film ===
Year	Title	Role	Type
1994	Country Life	Billy Livingstone	Feature film
1997	The Last of the Ryans	Peter Walker	TV movie
1997	Doing Time for Patsy Cline	Brad Goodall	Feature film
1999	Two Hands	Wally	Feature film
1999	Strange Planet	Ewan	Feature film
2000	Risk	Ben Madigan	Feature film
2000	The Dish	Glenn Latham	Feature film
2001	Hildegarde	Tony	Feature film
2002	Heroes' Mountain	Paul Featherstone	TV movie
2003	The Postcard Bandit	Brenden Abbott	TV movie
2006	The Book of Revelation	Daniel	Feature film
2006	Black Jack: Ghosts	Mike	TV movie
2007	Joanne Lees: Murder in the Outback	Tony Elliot	TV movie

=== Television ===
Year	Title	Role	Type
1992	The Leaving of Liverpool	Ned	TV miniseries (2 part)
1995	Echo Point	Dave Campbell	TV series
1998-2000	SeaChange	Angus Kabiri	TV series
2001	Do or Die	Michael Tyler / Joey	TV miniseries
2002	Young Lions	Det. Sr. Const. Guy 'Guido' Martin	TV series
2006	Two Twisted	Karl Wells	TV series, 1 episode
2008-09	East of Everything	Vance Watkins	TV series
2012	Woodley	Greg	TV series (final appearance)
