= Looking for Alibrandi (film) =

- DVD cover
- Directed by: Kate Woods
- Written by: Melina Marchetta
- Based on: Looking for Alibrandi by Melina Marchetta
- Produced by: Robyn Kershaw
- Starring: Greta Scacchi; Anthony LaPaglia; Elena Cotta; Kerry Walker; Pia Miranda
- Cinematography: Toby Oliver
- Edited by: Martin Connor
- Music by: Alan John
- Production companies: Australian Film Finance Corporation; Beyond Films; Showtime Australia; New South Wales Film and Television Office; Miall and Kershaw Productions
- Distributed by: Beyond Distribution
- Release date: 4 May 2000
- Running time: 103 minutes
- Country: Australia
- Languages: English; Italian
- Budget: $4.5 million
- Box office: $8.3 million

Looking for Alibrandi is a 2000 Australian coming-of-age film directed by Kate Woods and written by Melina Marchetta (which she adapted from her 1992 novel of the same name). The film is set in 1990s Sydney, New South Wales, and features a cast of Australian actors, including Pia Miranda as Josephine Alibrandi, the film's main character; Anthony LaPaglia as her father, Michael Andretti, who left her and her mother before her birth; and Kick Gurry as Josie's love interest, Jacob Coote. The film won the Australian Film Institute Award for Best Film in 2000.

== Plot ==
Josephine (nicknamed "Josie") Alibrandi (Pia Miranda) is an ambitious and outspoken 17-year-old Italian-Australian teenager who lives in Glebe, an inner-western suburb in Sydney, and is in her final year of high school. Josie is a scholarship student (also vice-captain) at the prestigious Catholic girls school St Martha's (which is located in the eastern suburbs of Sydney), where she is completing her HSC. Most of the students are Anglo-Australian and from elite socio-economic backgrounds, and she experiences xenophobia and discrimination due to her Italian and working-class background (and also due to growing up in a single-parent household). Josie attends St. Martha's with her two best friends, Sera (Leanne Carlow) and Anna (Diane Viduka). She is friends with John Barton (Matthew Newton), who attends St Anthony's College, the brother school of St Martha's. She has romantic feelings for him, but has not explicitly disclosed them. He is the son of an influential politician, and feels pressure to follow in his father's footsteps. Josie meets Jacob Coote (Kick Gurry), a rebellious and charismatic public school student, at an inter school debate. They dance together at Josie's Year 12 formal, and even go on a date, but their personalities clash and they mutually decide to not pursue things further.

Josie's mother, Christina Alibrandi (Greta Scacchi), gave birth to Josie out of wedlock when she was 17. Christina was disowned by her father, Francesco Alibrandi, and banished from the family home until his death. Josie has a complicated relationship with her grandmother/nonna, Katia Alibrandi (Elena Cotta), and they frequently argue. Christina never told Josie's father, Michael Andretti (Anthony LaPaglia), that she had his baby. He moved to Adelaide to study law, and has since been working as a lawyer there. During Josie's final year of high school, he visits Sydney temporarily for work and finds out about his child. Josie is initially uninterested in pursuing a father/daughter relationship with Michael, due to his absence for most of her life.

One day, Josie arrives at school and it is revealed that John Barton has taken his own life. Josie is devastated and struggles to cope with the loss. She seeks comfort in Jacob, and they begin a romantic relationship. Josie gets into a physical altercation with Carly (Leeanna Walsman) at school, and after Carly's father threatens to sue, she asks Michael for his help. They bond as father and daughter and start spending time together. Michael decides to move back to Sydney for a more long-term basis.

Katia reveals a family secret; throughout their marriage, Francesco was abusive and neglectful towards her. She then had an affair with an Anglo-Australian man, Marcus Sandford, and he is the biological father of Christina. Francesco was aware that Christina was not his biological daughter because he was infertile, and this was one of the reasons why he resented her so much. Katia revealing this secret helps improve her relationship with Christina and Josie, and they subsequently grow closer as a family.

== Cast ==
- Greta Scacchi as Christina Alibrandi
- Anthony LaPaglia as Michael Andretti
- Elena Cotta as Katia Alibrandi
- Kerry Walker as Sister Louise, Nun
- Pia Miranda as Josephine "Josie" Alibrandi
- Kick Gurry as Jacob Coote
- Matthew Newton as John Barton
- Leanne Carlow as Sera Conti
- Diane Viduka as Anna Selicic
- Leeanna Walsman as Carly Bishop
- Michael Gallina as Robert
- Rosa DiMarte as Patrizia
- Geoff Morrell as Mr. Barton
- Ned Manning as Mr. Coote

== Production ==
The world premiere of the play Looking for Alibrandi, based on the novel, was created and performed by the PACT Youth Theatre in 1995. It sold out for three seasons, leading to the making of a film adaptation.

The film was produced by Robyn Kershaw.

The entire film was filmed in Sydney, including such locations as Glebe (Alibrandi's house), Bondi Beach, Sydney Central Station on Eddy Avenue, the Sydney Opera House (including the Concert Hall Northern Foyer), George Street/Anzac Bridge (the scene where Jacob Coote sent Josephine Alibrandi home with his motorcycle), the Scots College and Kincoppal School were also used throughout the film, the main quadrangle of University of Sydney (the John Barton and Josephine Alibrandi scene), Village Cinema (Jacob and Josie's date) and Oporto (where Josie works part-time).

== Critical acclaim ==
The film, while not well known in international markets, has received critical acclaim for its insights into both the second-generation-migrant experience and the universal human condition.

Looking for Alibrandi was Kate Woods' directorial debut in film; Woods was acclaimed for "giving [the film's] multicultural terrain the true respect and depth it deserves."

== Awards ==
Looking for Alibrandi won five awards at the 2000 AFI Awards:

- Best Film–presented to producer Robyn Kershaw
- Best Lead Actress–Pia Miranda
- Best Supporting Actress–Greta Scacchi
- Best Adapted Screenplay–Melina Marchetta (adapted from her own novel)
- Best Film Editing–Martin Connor

== Box office ==
Looking for Alibrandi grossed approximately $8,300,000 at the box office in Australia.

== See also ==
- Cinema of Australia
- Sydney in film
