= Kate Woods =

Australian film and television director

- Occupations: Film director, television director
- Years active: 1984–present

Kate Woods is an Australian film and television director who has directed and produced mini series, television shows, pilots and feature films.

== Career ==
In 1984, Woods became the first female to direct for the Australian Broadcasting Corporation as an assistant director for Kindred Spirits. She worked as director on shows such as G.P., Heartland, and Something in the Air. During this time she had the opportunity to work with Academy-Award winner Jane Campion, while also providing Cate Blanchett and Hugh Jackman with some of their first on-screen roles.

Woods made her feature film directorial debut with the film Looking for Alibrandi (2000), which won 5 AACTA Awards from Australian Film Institute, including Best Film.

In 2005, Woods moved to America, working as a television director on shows including Person of Interest, Agents of S.H.I.E.L.D., and The Umbrella Academy.

In 2020, Woods directed four of the ten episodes of the controversial Netflix miniseries, Messiah.

In 2024, Woods was named as director for Kangaroo.

== Selected filmography ==
=== As Director ===
Film
| Year | Title | Role | Notes |
|---|---|---|---|
| 2000 | Looking for Alibrandi | Director | Film |
| 2025 | Kangaroo | Director | Film |

=== Television ===
| Year | Title | Role | Notes | Ref |
|---|---|---|---|---|
| 1987 | Relative Merits | Director | TV series | |
| 1988 | The Last Resort | Director | TV series | |
| 1989-92 | G. P. | Director | 8 episodes | |
| 1992-93 | Phoenix | Director | 6 episodes | |
| 1992-93 | Police Rescue | Director | 4 episodes | |
| 1994 | Heartland | Director | 13 episodes | |
| 1994 | Escape from Jupiter | Director | 10 episodes | |
| 1994-95 | Janus | Director | 6 episodes | |
| 1995 | Correlli | Director | 3 episodes | |
| 1996 | Mercury | Director | 1 episode | |
| 1996 | The Feds: Deadfall | Director | TV movie | |
| 1997 | Big Sky | Director | 2 episodes | |
| 1997 | Simone de Beauvoir's Babies | Director | 4 episodes | |
| 1997-98 | Raw FM | Director | 2 episodes | |
| 1998 | Wildside | Director | 2 episodes | |
| 2000 | Something in the Air | Director | 3 episodes | |
| 2001 | The Farm | Director | 3 episodes | |
| 2001 | Changi | Director | 6 episodes | |
| 2002 | Worst Best Friends | Director | 4 episodes | |
| 2003 | Farscape | Director | 1 episode | |
| 2003 | Always Greener | Director | 2 episodes | |
| 2002-03 | MDA | Director | 2 episodes | |
| 2003 | The Sleepover Club | Director | 6 episodes | |
| 2007 | Crossing Jordan | Director | 1 episode | |
| 2007 | Shark | Director | 2 episodes | |
| 2006-07 | Without a Trace | Director | 4 episodes | |
| 2007 | Law & Order: Special Victims Unit | Director | 2 episodes | |
| 2007 | Blackjack: Ghosts | Director | TV movie | |
| 2004-08 | All Saints | Director | 3 episodes | |
| 2009 | Private Practice | Director | 1 episode | |
| 2009 | City Homicide | Director | 2 episodes | |
| 2010 | Past Life | Director | 1 episode | |
| 2010 | Lie to Me | Director | 1 episode | |
| 2011 | Body of Proof | Director | 1 episode | |
| 2011 | Suits | Director | 1 episode | |
| 2010-11 | Covert Affairs | Director | 3 episodes | |
| 2011 | Against the Wall | Director | 1 episode | |
| 2011 | House | Director | 1 episode | |
| 2011 | Hawaii Five-0 | Director | 1 episode | |
| 2010-12 | NCIS: Los Angeles | Director | 4 episodes | |
| 2013 | The Mob Doctor | Director | 1 episode | |
| 2013 | Camp | Director | 1 episode | |
| 2013 | King & Maxwell | Director | 1 episode | |
| 2013 | Do No Harm | Director | 2 episodes | |
| 2006-13 | Bones | Director | 8 episodes | |
| 2013 | Nashville | Director | 1 episode | |
| 2014 | Revenge | Director | 1 episode | |
| 2015 | MyChonny Moves In | Director | 6 episodes | |
| 2015 | Complications | Director | 1 episode | |
| 2014-15 | Rizzoli & Isles | Director | 3 episodes | |
| 2016 | Unforgettable | Director | 1 episode | |
| 2012-16 | Castle | Director | 5 episodes | |
| 2015-16 | Person of Interest | Director | 2 episodes | |
| 2016 | Rectify | Director | 1 episode | |
| 2017 | Blindspot | Director | 1 episode | |
| 2017 | The Magicians | Director | 1 episode | |
| 2017 | Hand of God | Director | 1 episode | |
| 2017 | Once Upon a Time | Director | 1 episode | |
| 2016-17 | Underground | Director | 3 episodes | |
| 2015-18 | Agents of S.H.I.E.L.D. | Director | 3 episodes | |
| 2018 | Unsolved | Director | 2 episodes | |
| 2018 | Fighting Season | Director | 4 episodes | |
| 2020 | Messiah | Director | 4 episodes | |
| 2020 | The Good Lord Bird | Director | 1 episode | |
| 2020-21 | Home Before Dark | Director | 2 episodes | |
| 2021 | The Lost Symbol | Director | 2 episodes | |
| 2022 | Good Sam | Director | 1 episode | |
| 2022 | Bosch: Legacy | Director | 1 episode | |
| 2022 | The Umbrella Academy | Director | 1 episode | |
| 2022 | Law & Order: Organized Crime | Director | 1 episode | |
| 2023 | The Lincoln Lawyer | Director | 2 episodes | |

== List of awards and nominations received by Kate Woods ==
| Year | Organisation | Name Of Award / Category | Nominated work | Result | Ref |
|---|---|---|---|---|---|
| 1992 | Australian Film Institute | Best Achievement in Direction in a Television Drama | Phoenix ("Fond Memories") | Nominated | |
| 1993 | Australian Film Institute | Best Achievement in Direction in a Television Drama | Phoenix ("Under Siege") | Nominated | |
| 2000 | Australian Film Institute | Best Achievement in Direction | Looking for Alibrandi | Nominated | |
| 2001 | Film Critics Circle of Australia | Best Director | Looking for Alibrandi | Nominated | |
| 2008 | Australian Directors' Guild | Michael Carson Award | | Won | |
| 2021 | Australian Directors' Guild | Best Direction in a TV or SVOD Miniseries Episode | The Good Lord Bird | Nominated | |
