= Simon Burke =

Australian actor (born 1961)

Simon Burke AO
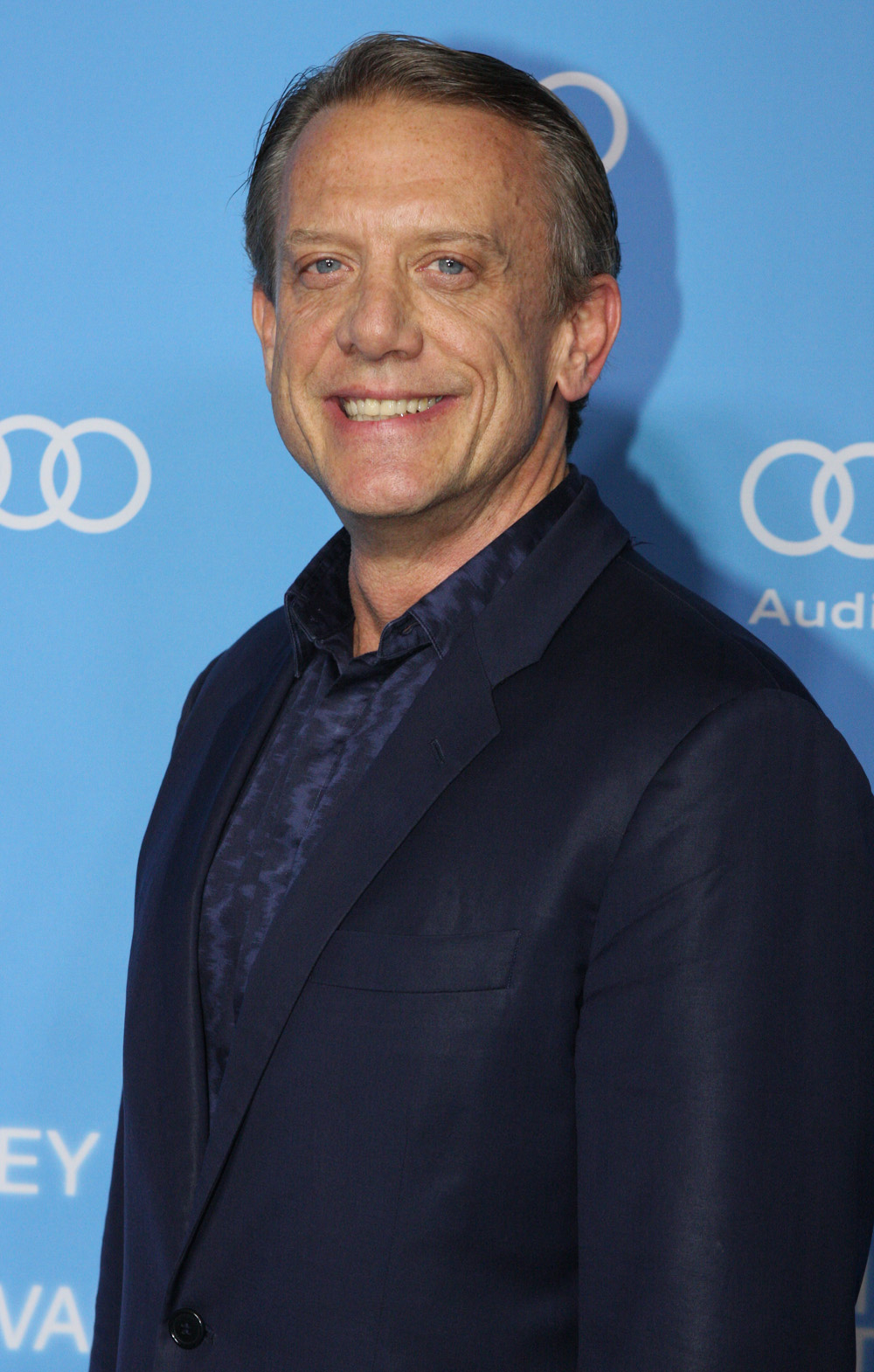
- Simon Burke, June 2013
- Born: 8 October 1961 (age 65); Melbourne, Australia
- Occupation: Actor
- Years active: 1973–present

Simon Gareth Burke AO (born 8 October 1961) is an Australian actor, active in films, television and theatre.

== Biography ==
Simon Burke began his career at the age of 12, starring in Michael Cove's Kookaburra (1974); a painful look at a dysfunctional working-class family, focusing particularly on an almost autistic young boy. Soon after at the age of 13, Burke starred in Fred Schepisi's acclaimed feature film The Devil's Playground for which he won the AFI Award for Best Actor at the Australian Film Institute Awards. He remains the youngest person ever to be honoured with this award. Since then he has enjoyed great success both in Australia and internationally in film, television, stage, concert appearances and cabaret.

In 2014, Burke starred in Matchbox Pictures/NBC-Universal's highly acclaimed miniseries Devil's Playground in which he reprised the role of Tom Allen that he created as a 13-year-old. He was the co-creator and executive producer of the project, and in the same year it won both the AACTA and Logie Award for Most Outstanding Telefeature or Miniseries.

He has since starred in numerous film, television and theatre productions in Australia and the UK. He starred as Captain Georg von Trapp in The Sound of Music at the London Palladium alongside Connie Fisher and then Summer Strallen. He also played the role of Mr Banks in Mary Poppins in Sydney, Brisbane, Perth and Auckland.

Burke was Federal President of Actors Equity Australia (2004–14). He is currently a Vice President of the International Federation of Actors (FIA), a global federation of performers, trade unions, guilds and professional associations.

On 10 September 2015, at the Queens Birthday Honours ceremony presided over by the Governor of New South Wales, General David Hurley, Burke was made an Officer of the Order of Australia (AO) with the following citation: For distinguished service to the performing arts as an actor, singer and producer, and through senior advocacy roles for performers' rights and access to professional development and education programs.

Simon Burke is also well remembered for his long term stint as a presenter on the children's television series Play School from 1988 to 2007 then 2013 and again in 2020.

== Personal life ==
In 2016 he publicly identified himself as being gay.

== Filmography ==
=== Film ===
Year	Title	Role	Notes
1976	The Devil's Playground	Tom Allen	
1978	The Irishman	Michael Doolan	
1982	The Clinic	Paul	
1987	Slate, Wyn & Me	Wyn Jackson	
1999	Passion	Herman Sandby	
2000	Pitch Black	Greg Owens	
2003	Preservation	Mr. Crewe	
2003	Travelling Light	Ray Sugars	
2006	Shuffle	Edgar	Short
2015	Super Awesome!	Jack Simpson	
2017	Dirt Tin	Burko	Short

=== Television ===
Year	Title	Role	Notes
1973	Matlock Police	Davey Evans	Episode: "Sky High"
1977	The Sullivans	Peter Robinson	Episode:,"1.37"
1977	The Restless Years	Stephen Moran	
1979	The Young Doctors	David McAllister	
1980	Slippery Slide	Steve	Television film
1982	A Country Practice	Roger Morrison	Episode: "The Push: Parts 1 & 2"
1983	Scales of Justice	Probationary Constable Leonard "Spider" Webber	Episode: "The Job"
1987	The Flying Doctors	Daryl Stokes	Episode: "Keeping Up Appearances"
1988–2007, 2013	Play School	Presenter	TV series
1988	Great Performances	John McCormack	"Melba"
1988	Always Afternoon	Tom	
1991	Brides of Christ	Jack Delahunty	Episode: "Paul"
1991	Heroes II: The Return	Capt. Ellis	Television film
1992	Six Pack		Miniseries
1996	The One That Got Away	Stan	Television film
1997	Water Rats	Det. Sgt. 'Mac' Phillips	Episode:,"Blood Trail", "Dead or Alive"
1998	Murder Call	Guy Searle	Season 2, episode 14: "Menu for Murder"
2001	South Pacific	Harbison	Television film
2001	Blue Heelers	Mick Boyce	Episode: "Blood"
2002	Heroes' Mountain	Euan Diver	Television film
2002	Young Lions	Rob Watson	Episodes: "Boy School Bullies", "Asylum Seekers", "Nursing Home"
2003	Grass Roots	Tony Ludovic	Episode: "Egomania"
2003	The Postcard Bandit	Thomas	Television film
2003	After the Deluge	Michael	Television film
2004	The Alice	Patrick	Television film
2005–2006	The Alice	Patrick	Main role
2006	Small Claims: The Reunion	Jon	Television film
2007	All Saints	Brad Douglas	Episode: "Balancing Act"
2009	Hustle	Nick	Episode: "The Road Less Travelled"
2010	Rescue: Special Ops	Warren Thompson	Episode: "Enemy Mine"
2011	I Shouldn't Be Alive	Mike Dillon	Episode: "Left for Dead on Everest"
2013	Miss Fisher's Murder Mysteries	Nicholas Mortimer	Episode: "Murder Under the Mistletoe"
2014	Devil's Playground	Tom Allen	Miniseries
2016	Rake	Warwick Dormann	Episode "4.1"
2016	Deep Water	Simon Mawbrey	Miniseries
2018	Dead Lucky	Tom Hodge	3 episodes
2023	Crazy Fun Park	Mark	2 episodes

== Theatre ==
Year	Title	Role	Notes
1974	Kookaburra		Nimrod Theatre Company
1979:	Romeo and Juliet		Nimrod Theatre Company
1980	Pirates at the Barn		Nimrod Theatre Company
1981	The Choir		Nimrod Theatre Company
1983	Are You Lonesome Tonight?		Nimrod Theatre Company
1985	Jonah Jones	Waxy	Wharf Theatre for Sydney Theatre Company
1986	Jonah Jones	Jonah Jones	Wharf Theatre for Sydney Theatre Company
1986	Company	Harry	Sydney Opera House for Sydney Theatre Company
1987–88	Les Misérables	Marius	Theatre Royal
1989–90	Anything Goes	Billy Crocker	Australia/New Zealand tour - won Green Room Award for Best Actor in a Musical
1992-93	The Phantom of the Opera	Raoul	Her Majesty's Theatre, London
	Leonardo the Musical: A Portrait of Love	Leonardo	Old Fire Station Oxford
	Cabaret	Cliff	Crucible Theatre, Sheffield
	The Life of the World to Come		Almeida Theatre
	The Wild Party	Burrs	
	Take Flight	George Puttnam	
1994:	Nosferatu the Vampire	The Innkeeper	Concept cast recording
1994	Jeffrey	Steve	London premiere at Greenwich Theatre
	They're Playing Our Song	Vernon	
1994	Falsettos	Whizzer	Sydney Opera House, then tour of Victoria, Hobart & Canberra for Sydney Theatre Company - nominated Best Musical Performance Sydney Theatre Critics' Circle Awards
1996	A Little Night Music	Carl-Magnus	Royal National Theatre with Dame Judi Dench
1998	The Herbal Bed	Rafe Smith	Sydney Theatre Company interstate tour
1999	She Stoops to Conquer		Sydney Theatre Company
1999–2000	Chicago	Billy Flynn	Sydney, Perth, Brisbane, Singapore, Hong Kong
2001	Up for Grabs	Gerry	World premiere at Sydney Opera House for Sydney Theatre Company
2002	Mr. Kolpert	Bastian	Sydney Theatre Company
2004	High Society	CK Dexter Haven	State Theatre, Victorian Arts Centre for The Production Company
2005–06	Three Furies – Scenes from the Life of Francis Bacon	Francis Bacon	Sydney Festival, Perth Festival & Adelaide Festival - nominated Best Actor Sydney Theatre Awards 2006
2007	Company	Harry	Theatre Royal for Kookaburra Musical Theatre
2007	October	Detective Dick	World premiere for Griffin Theatre Company
2007	The Adventures of Snugglepot and Cuddlepie and Little Ragged Blossom	Mr Lizard / Baby Koala	Theatre Royal
2007–08	The Sound of Music	Captain Georg von Trapp	London Palladium
2009	When the Rain Stops Falling	Joe	Almeida Theatre, European premiere
	Australia Plays Broadway	Host / Performer	Carnegie Hall
	Take Me Out	Mason Marzac	Australian premiere for Melbourne Theatre Company
	Satango		World premiere for Griffin Theatre Company
2009	La Cage aux Folles	Georges	Playhouse Theatre, London
2010	The Sound of Music	Captain Georg von Trapp	Princess of Wales Theatre, Toronto
2010	Holding the Man	Dick Conigrave	Trafalgar Studios, London
2010–12	Mary Poppins	Mr Banks	Sydney, Brisbane, Perth, Auckland
2013	Mrs. Warren's Profession	Praed	Wharf Theatre for Sydney Theatre Company
2014	La Cage aux Folles	Georges	Victorian Arts Centre for The Production Company
2017	The Homosexuals, or Faggots	Warren	Malthouse Theatre, Melbourne
2017	Noises Off	Lloyd Dallas	Queensland Theatre Company, Melbourne Theatre Company
2018	Strangers in Between	Peter	Fortyfivedownstairs, Melbourne
2019	Mary Stuart	Amias Paulet	Kate Mulvany's adaptation at Roslyn Packer Theatre, Sydney Theatre Company
2020–21	Pippin	Charlemagne	Sydney Lyric Theatre
2021–24	Moulin Rouge! The Musical	Harold Zidler	Regent Theatre, Melbourne, Capitol Theatre, Sydney, QPAC Brisbane) - winner of Sydney Theatre Award for Best Performance in a Supporting role in a Musical 2022
2024	Wicked	The Wonderful Wizard of Oz	Australian Tour
2026	The Elocution of Benjamin Franklin	Robert O'Brien	Griffin Theatre Company

== Bibliography ==
- Holmstrom, John. The Moving Picture Boy: An International Encyclopaedia from 1895 to 1995. Norwich, Michael Russell, 1996, p. 338.
