= Kick Gurry =

Australian actor

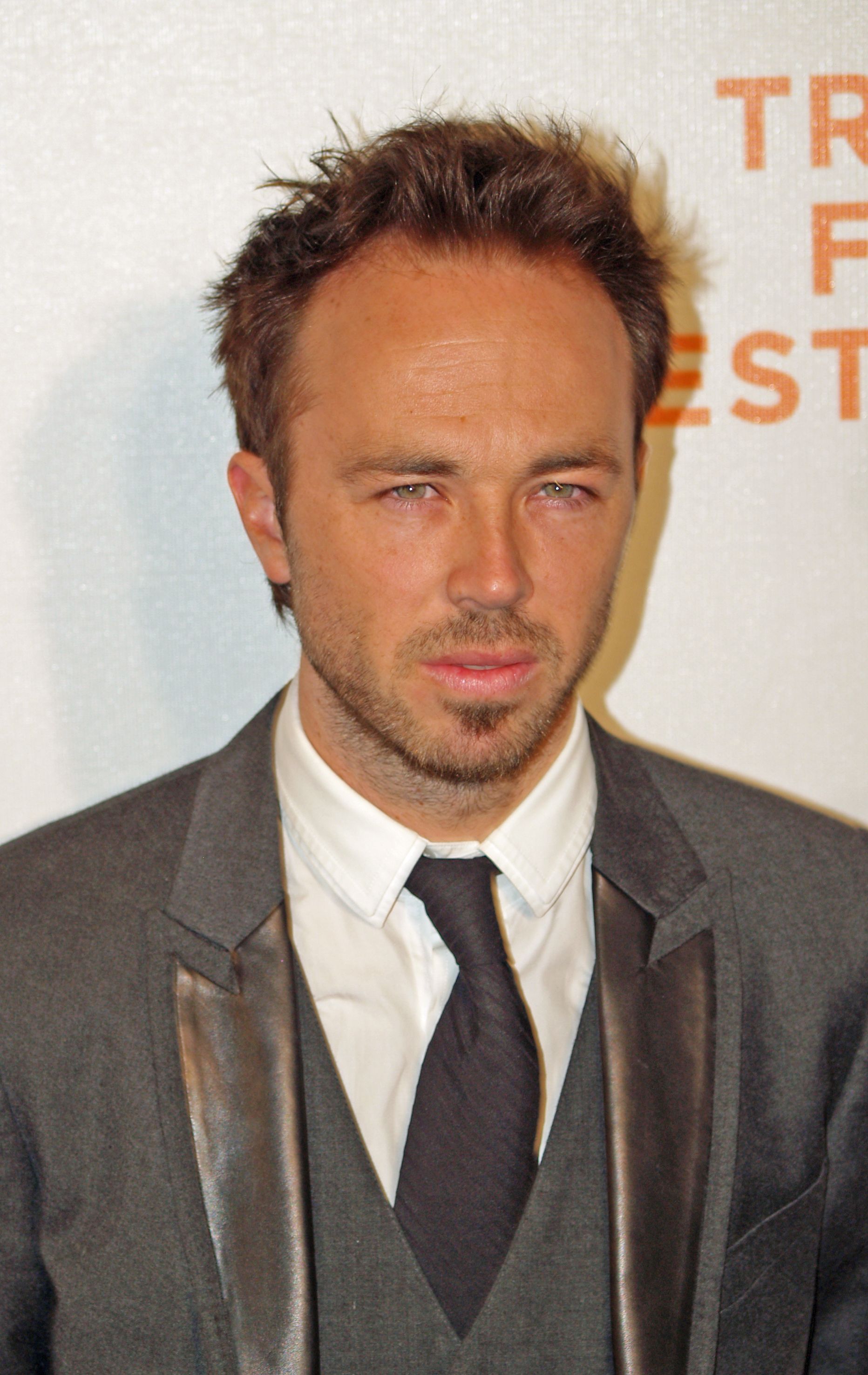
- Gurry at the Tribeca Film Festival, 2008
- Born: Christopher Gurry; May 25, 1978 (age 48); Melbourne, Victoria, Australia
- Occupations: Actor, director, writer
- Years active: 1995–present
- Known for: Looking for Alibrandi; Garage Days; Speed Racer; Jupiter Ascending; Edge of Tomorrow; War Machine; Tangle; Ten Days in the Valley; Caught

Christopher "Kick" Gurry (born 1978) is an Australian actor. He is known for his roles in films such as Looking for Alibrandi (1999), Garage Days (2002), Speed Racer (2008), and Edge of Tomorrow (2014), and has also starred in several television series.

== Early life and education ==
Gurry was born in Melbourne, Australia. He got his nickname when his brother could not say Christopher so he said "Kicker". When he got into high school, he shortened it to "Kick". He studied at Wesley College, Melbourne.

== Career ==
Gurry initially appeared in television guest roles in Raw FM, SeaChange, State Coroner, Wildside and Halifax f.p.. He then starred in his breakthrough Australian film roles as Jacob Coote in Looking for Alibrandi (2000) and Freddy in Garage Days (2002).

He went on to appear in American feature films Spartan (2004, alongside Val Kilmer and William H. Macy), Daltry Calhoun (2005, with Johnny Knoxville), Speed Racer (2008, with Emile Hirsch), Edge of Tomorrow (2014, opposite Tom Cruise and Emily Blunt), Jupiter Ascending (2016, with Channing Tatum and Mila Kunis) and War Machine (2017, alongside Brad Pitt).

He starred in several Australian television series including miniseries The Alice as Darren (2005–2006), seasons 2 and 3 of Tangle as Joe Kovac (2010–2012) and 4 episodes of Offspring (2012). He had appearances in American series Cybergeddon (2012) and CSI: Crime Scene Investigation (2014).

In 2016, Gurry joined the filming for American drama series Ten Days in the Valley (opposite Kyra Sedgwick) appearing as Pete Greene for all 10 episodes. In 2021, he appeared as Mac in the Australian ABC surf drama miniseries Barons.

In 2022, Gurry created, wrote and directed the 6 episode Stan original series Caught, as well as playing the role of Dylan Fox. American actor Sean Penn contacted Gurry to ask to produce the series, and also went on to star in it, alongside Matthew Fox, Susan Sarandon, Alexander England, Lincoln Younes and Bryan Brown. In 2023 the series was released in Australia to mixed reviews, but was delayed by UK streaming platform ITVx because of the start of the Gaza war.

== Filmography ==
=== Television ===
Year	Title	Role	Notes
2023	Caught	Dylan Fox	Season 1, 6 episodes
2022	Barons	Mac	Miniseries, 3 episodes
2017–19	Friends from College	Tag	Seasons 1–2, 3 episodes
2017–18	Sense8	Puck	Season 2, 5 episodes
2018	Hollywood Mom	Ted	Season 1, 1 episode: Pilot
2017	Ten Days in the Valley	Pete Greene	Season 1, 10 episodes
2014	CSI: Cyber	Clikk	Season 14, episode 21: "Kitty"
2012	Cybergeddon	Rabbit Rosen	Season 1, 2 episodes
2012	Cybergeddon Zips	Rabbit Rosen	Season 1, episode 3: "Rabbit"
2012	Offspring	Adam	Season 3, 4 episodes
2010–12	Tangle	Joe Kovac	Seasons 2–3, 12 episodes
2006	Two Twisted	Jenkins	Miniseries, episode 11: "Jailbreak"
2005–06	The Alice	Darren	Miniseries, 10 episodes
2002	Young Lions	Danny	Season 1, episode 22: "Serial Killer: Part 2"
1999	Halifax f.p.	Luke	Season 4, episode 1: "Someone You Know"
1999	Wildside	Steve	Season 2, episode 14
1998	State Coroner	Josh	Season 2, episode 9: "Three's a Crowd"
1998	SeaChange	Jerome	Season 1, episode 9: "Balls and Friggin Good Luck"
1997	Raw FM	Toby	Season 1, 2 episodes

=== Film ===
Year	Title	Role	Notes
2022	McCrorey Road	Frank	Short film
2020	At the Edge of Night	Sneak	Short film
2017	War Machine	Tom Howard	Feature film
2015	Jupiter Ascending	Vladie	Feature film
2014	Edge of Tomorrow	Griff	Feature film
2013	Off Course	Chaz	Short film
2011	Spider Walk	Greg	Short film
2011	Cocks	Alpha	Short film
2008	Speed Racer	Sparky	Feature film
2005	Daltry Calhoun	Frankie Strunk	Feature film
2004	Spartan	Agent Jones	Feature film
2003	Good Luck Jeffrey Brown	Jeffrey Brown	Short film
2002	Garage Days	Freddy	Feature film
2001	The Big House	Sonny	Short film
2001	Buffalo Soldiers		Feature film
2000	Looking for Alibrandi	Jacob Coote	Feature film
1998	The Thin Red Line	Soldier (uncredited)	Feature film
1998	Denial FM	Slink	Short film
1996	Inner Sanctuary	Street Walker	Feature film

=== Production ===
Year	Title	Role	Notes
2023	Caught	Writer, Creator, Director	6 episodes
