= Syd Brisbane =

Australian actor (active 1982– )

- Education: Flinders University Drama Centre (1983)
- Occupation: Actor
- Years active: 1982–present
- Notable work: Epsilon (1995); Silent Partner (2001)

Syd Brisbane is an Australian actor.

== Early life and education ==
Brisbane undertook his formal training at the Flinders University Drama Centre, in Adelaide, graduating in 1983.

== Career ==
In 1990, Brisbane appeared in AFI Award-winning film Struck by Lightning and miniseries Shadows of the Heart with Marcus Graham. He then had a role in 1992 TV sports drama miniseries Tracks of Glory, with Cameron Daddo and Richard Roxburgh. He followed this with a role in 1993 independent film Bad Boy Bubby opposite Nicholas Hope. That same year, he appeared opposite Russell Crowe in one of his early roles, in drama film Hammers Over the Anvil.

In 1995, Brisbane starred as 'The Man' in Australian-Italian sci-fi film Epsilon (aka Alien Visitor) directed by Rolf de Heer. He also featured in 1998 romantic comedy Dead Letter Office with Miranda Otto, before playing a customs official in The Missing the following year.

In 2001, Brisbane co-starred with David Field in comedy drama film Silent Partner, in the role of Bill. He appeared opposite Nathan Phillips in two films in 2004 – comedy adventure Under the Radar and drama One Perfect Day. A role in TV movie Little Oberon followed in 2005, where he played opposite Sigrid Thornton. In 2006, he played the role of Jeff in comedy feature BoyTown, alongside Glenn Robbins and Mick Molloy. The following year he featured in docudrama film Boxing Day.

In 2012, Brisbane played the part of Gavin 'Cheesy' Cheeseman in Beaconsfield, a TV movie based on the true story of Brant Webb and Todd Russell, who were trapped nearly a kilometre below the surface in a mining disaster. The same year, he had a recurring role as Repro in miniseries Conspiracy 365.

Brisbane played the role of Ben in 2014 crime film Cut Snake, alongside Sullivan Stapleton and Jessica De Gouw. That same year, he had a role as Smythe in Fell, with Daniel Henshall and Jacqueline McKenzie. A part in comedy film Sucker with Timothy Spall and Shaun Micallef followed, as well as the recurring role of Mr Norris, school maths teacher and year head, in children's series Worst Year of My Life Again. He then appeared in the 2016 sequel to Red Dog, family film Red Dog: True Blue, with Jason Isaacs, Levi Miller and Bryan Brown.

In 2020, Brisbane acted in a recurring capacity in drama miniseries Stateless, with Yvonne Strahovski, Cate Blanchett and Jai Courtenay. In 2022, Brisbane was announced as part of the cast for season two of ABC comedy series Aftertaste, in which he played the role of Terry, opposite Erik Thomson and Rachel Griffiths. He also played Mark in 2022 Paramount+ drama series More Than This. Most recently, he was named in the cast for the 2026 second season of Amazon Prime black comedy mystery series Deadloch. He is also set to appear in upcoming Stan original series Gnomes, starring Asa Butterfield.

Brisbane has also worked extensively in theatre. In 1998, he performed in a production of The Europeans for Sydney's Wharf Theatre in 1998 and in Blue Remembered Hills for Belvoir Street Theatre in 2001. In 2012 he performed in a staging of Unpack This! at Subiaco Arts Centre, In 2016, he played the role of Manuel in a national touring production of Fawlty Towers, which was adapted for the stage by John Cleese.

Brisbane co-founded theatre production company The Rabble in Melbourne 2006.

== Awards ==
Year	Work	Award	Category	Result	Ref.
2016	Ryan	Green Room Awards	Best Male Performer – Independent Theatre	Nominated	
2024	Animal Farm	Green Room Awards	Best Performer	Nominated	

== Filmography ==
=== Television ===
Year	Title	Role	Notes	Ref.
1990	Shadows of the Heart	Johnny	2 episodes	
1992	Tracks of Glory	Larrikan	2 episodes	
1994	The Battlers	Smith		
1995	Correlli	Steve	1 episode	
1997	We Are Angels	Father	6 episodes	
1998–2001	Blue Heelers	Various characters	2 episodes	
1999–2002	Stingers	Various characters	4 episodes	
2001	Horace and Tina	Mr Wilson	1 episode	
2002	Shock Jock	Chip	1 episode	
2002	The Secret Life of Us	Foreman	1 episode	
2003	MDA	Scott Watts	1 episode	
2003	McLeod's Daughters	Ben	1 episode	
2005	Heartbreak Tour	Sergeant Falk	TV movie	
2005	Little Oberon	Butcher	TV movie	
2008	The Saddle Club	Gus	2 episodes	
2010	City Homicide	Brian Hocking	1 episode	
2012	Conspiracy 365	Repro	4 episodes	
2012	Laid	Peter	1 episode	
2012	Beaconsfield	Gavin 'Cheesy' Cheeseman	TV movie	
2013	Nowhere Boys	Jim	1 episode	
2013	Upper Middle Bogan	Farmer	1 episode	
2013	Mr & Mrs Murder	Lincoln	1 episode	
2013	The Doctor Blake Mysteries	Stan Egan	1 episode	
2014	Worst Year of My Life Again	Mr Quinnford Norris	9 episodes	
2014; 2016	Wentworth	Martin Tucker	2 episodes	
2017	The Ex-PM	Loins	1 episode	
2017	True Story with Hamish & Andy	JJ	1 episode	
2019	Upright	Barry	1 episode	
2019	The Inbestigators	Gary	1 episode	
2019	Glitch	Cam	1 episode	
2019	Bloom	Mayor Patrick Nemaric	1 episode	
2020	Stateless	Teddy	5 episodes	
2022	Black Snow	Drinker	1 episode	
2022	Shantaram	Foreperson	1 episode	
2022	Aftertaste	Terry	6 episodes	
2022	More Than This	Mark	2 episodes	
2023	Utopia	Foreman	1 episode	
2024	Buried	Nigel	3 episodes	
2024	High Country	Scooter	5 episodes	
2026	Deadloch	Roger	6 episodes	
TBA	Gnomes			

=== Film ===
Year	Title	Role	Notes	Ref.
1990	Struck by Lightning	Spencer		
1993	Bad Boy Bubby	Yobbo		
1993	Hammers Over the Anvil	Duke		
1996	Epsilon (aka Alien Visitor)	The Man		
1997	Kiss or Kill	Nikki's father		
1998	Dead Letter Office	Kevin		
1999	The Missing	Customs Official		
2001	Silent Partner	Bill		
2003	The Legend of Matilda Dixon	Lowell Hansen		
2004	Under the Radar	Garry		
2004	Holly's Grail		Short film	
2004	One Perfect Day	Hamish		
2006	The Amazing Adventures of Gavin, a Leafy Seadragon	Gavin (voice)	Short film	
2006	BoyTown	Jeff		
2006	The Cow Thief	Cow Thief	Short film	
2007	Boxing Day	Dave		
2007	Let Me Not	Mr Lovett		
2008	Why I Fired My Secretary	Kevin	Short film	
2008	Hawker	Hawker	Short film	
2009	The Pistachio Effect	Kevin	Short film	
2010	Agency Time	Van	Short film	
2011	Keeper	Beggar	Short film	
2014	Cut Snake	Ben		
2014	Fell	Smythe		
2015	Sucker	Micky		
2016	Red Dog: True Blue	Big John		
2017	The Knife Salesman	Tom	Short film	
2019	Dirt Music	Chugger		
2022	Sam and Sophie	Yelling Poet	Short film	
2023	Related		Short film	
2026	Silent Night	Brett (voice)	Short film	
TBA	The Busking Adventures of Violet and Sparkles	Luke	Short film – Completed	
TBA	Tone	The Coach	Short film – Post-production	
TBA	Who Needs Love Songs?		Post-production	

== Theatre ==
=== As actor ===
Year	Title	Role	Notes	Ref.
1982	Happy End		Red Shed Theatre, Adelaide	
1984	Tibetan Inroads	Chongup / Tondrop	Unley Town Hall, Adelaide with Troupe Theatre Co	
1984	The Kelly Dance		Unley Town Hall, Adelaide, Church Theatre, Melbourne with Troupe Theatre Co	
1984	The Floating Palais		Unley Town Hall, Adelaide with Troupe Theatre Co	
1985	Troupe's Young Playwrights Season		Unley Town Hall, Adelaide with Troupe Theatre Co	
1985	Rundle Rita		Unley Town Hall, Adelaide with Troupe Theatre Co	
1985	The Search	Jason	Unley Town Hall, Adelaide with Troupe Theatre Co	
1985	The Life and Times of George Tudor		Unley Town Hall, Adelaide with Troupe Theatre Co	
1986	The Last Drive In On Earth	Tony	Unley Town Hall, Adelaide with Troupe Theatre Co	
1987	A Fortunate Life		SA tour with Harvest Theatre Company	
1988	Wilfrid Gordon McDonald Partridge		Studio Theatre, Melbourne, QPAC, Brisbane with Playbox Theatre & Patch Theatre	
1988	Immaculate Deceptions	Joe / Jesus / Giovanni	Red Shed Theatre, Adelaide	
1989	Road		Wetpack Theatre, Adelaide with Red Shed Company	
1990	Marat/Sade		Playhouse, Adelaide with STCSA	
1990	The Comedy of Errors		Playhouse, Adelaide with STCSA	
1990	Quickies		Space Theatre, Adelaide with STCSA	
1990	Restoration	Frank	Playhouse, Adelaide with STCSA	
1990	Capricornia	Frank McLash / Stanley Steggles /Serageant O'Crimnell	Playhouse, Adelaide, Playhouse, Melbourne with STCSA	
1990	Tales from the Decameron		Space Theatre, Adelaide with STCSA	
1991	Spring Awakening	Malchoir Gabor	Playhouse, Adelaide with STCSA	
1991	Offshore	Vince Mammon / Vigilante / Businessman	Thebarton Theatre, Adelaide with Junction Theatre Company	
1991	Sweetown		Red Shed Theatre, Adelaide	
1992	Dog Eat Dog	Lenin / Father / Computer	Red Shed Theatre, Adelaide	
1992	Tears of Blood		Theatre 62, Adelaide with Bearly Together Company	
1992	Low	Jay	Red Shed Theatre, Adelaide	
1993	All Souls		Red Shed Theatre, Adelaide,	
1993	The Red King		Space Theatre, Adelaide with Patch Theatre Co	
1996	Station 2: Eye of Another	Bing / Patrol Sergeant Bob / Jack	Red Shed Theatre, Adelaide	
1996	The Club	Danny Rowe	SA / VIC / TAS tour with STCSA	
1996	Silent Partner		Red Shed Theatre, Adelaide	
1996	Terminus		Red Shed Theatre, Adelaide	
1996	Dark Paths		Junction Theatre, Adelaide	
1996	Nil, Cat and Buried		Junction Theatre, Adelaide	
1996; 1997	[Uncle] Vanya	Vanya	Red Shed Theatre, Adelaide, Belvoir St Theatre, Sydney with Brink Productions	
1997	Cat	One man show	Melbourne	
1997	Features of Blown Youth	Strawberry	Queen's Theatre, Adelaide with Magpie Theatre Co	
1998	Morde		Praxis Theatre, Adelaide	
1998	Unidentified Human Remains and the True Nature of Love		Playhouse, Adelaide with STCSA	
1998	The Europeans		Wharf Theatre, Sydney, Balcony Theatre, Adelaide with Brink Productions & STC	
1999	Closer	Larry	Space Theatre, Adelaide with STCSA	
2000	Quartet		Queen's Theatre, Adelaide with Brink Productions	
2000	The Ecstatic Bible		Adelaide Festival with University of Adelaide & Brink Productions	
2000–2001	Blue Remembered Hills		Space Theatre, Adelaide, Belvoir St Theatre, Sydney with Brink Productions	
2001	The Prodigal Son / Insouciance		Malthouse Theatre, Melbourne with Playbox Theatre Co	
2001	Magpie		Arts House, Melbourne with Melbourne Workers Theatre	
2002	Enuff	Lieutenant	Malthouse Theatre, Melbourne with Playbox Theatre Co	
2002	Keene/Taylor Theatre Project Season 15: Scissors, Paper, Rock		Fortyfivedownstairs, Melbourne with STCSA	
2002	Dealer's Choice	Frankie	Space Theatre, Adelaide with STCSA	
2003	The Government Inspector		Arts House Meat Market, Melbourne with Hoist Theatre Group	
2003	The Eskimo Calling		Belvoir St Theatre, Sydney with Neonheart Theatre	
2003	Flame; Still		Tower Room, Melbourne with Look Look Theatre	
2004	Romeo and Juliet		Royal Botanic Gardens, Melbourne with Australian Shakespeare Co	
2004	Victory: Choices in Reaction		Wharf Theatre, Sydney with STC	
2005	Much Ado – The Musical		Majestic Cinemas with Australian Shakespeare Co	
2005	Lucky		La Mama, Melbourne	
2005	Twelfth Night		Royal Botanic Gardens, Melbourne with Australian Shakespeare Co	
2006	Squizzy		La Mama, Melbourne	
2006	The Bush Undertaker		Petty Traffikers, Melbourne	
2006	The Drover's Wife		Petty Traffikers, Melbourne	
2006	Been So Long		Bunka, Adelaide	
2006	Noble Rot		Fortyfivedownstairs, Melbourne	
2006	A Midsummer Night's Dream		Royal Botanic Gardens, Melbourne with Australian Shakespeare Co	
2007	A Man for All Seasons		VIC tour with Complete Works Theatre Co	
2007	Romeo and Juliet		Royal Botanic Gardens, Melbourne with Australian Shakespeare Co	
2008	Salome: In Cogito Volume 3		Carriageworks, Sydney with The Rabble	
2008	Father Son Rule		La Mama, Melbourne	
2008	Zombie State		University of Melbourne with Melbourne Workers Theatre	
2008	The Lower Depths		Fortyfivedownstairs, Melbourne	
2009	A Midsummer Night's Dream		Royal Botanic Gardens, Melbourne with Australian Shakespeare Co	
2010	The Comedy of Errors	Dromio of Syracuse	Melbourne Athenaeum, Royal Botanic Gardens, Melbourne	
2010	Squizzy		Trades Hall New Ballroom, Melbourne with Royal Botanic Gardens, Melbourne	
2011; 2014	Unpack This!		Subiaco Arts Centre, Perth, Mt Compass War Memorial Hall	
2011–2016	Coranderrk: We Will Show the Country		VIC / NSW with Ilbijerri Theatre Co / La Mama	
2012	Henry IV, Part 1	Henry Percy	Melbourne Athenaeum with Australian Shakespeare Co	
2012; 2014	Orlando		Malthouse Theatre, Melbourne with The Rabble	
2014	Night on Bald Mountain		Malthouse Theatre, Melbourne	
2016	The Village Bike		Red Stitch Actors Theatre	
2016	Triumph		Fortyfivedownstairs, Melbourne	
2016	Fawlty Towers	Manuel	Australian tour with Michael Coppel Entertainment	
2018	Fierce		Theatre Works, Melbourne	
2018	Macbeth	Witch 3 / Porter	Royal Botanical Gardens, Melbourne with Australian Shakespeare Co	
2018	Pygmalion	Alfred Doolittle	Australian Shakespeare Company	
2019	Macbeth	Macduff	Royal Botanic Gardens, Melbourne with Australian Shakespeare Co	
2020	Hamlet	Gravedigger	Royal Botanic Gardens, Melbourne with Australian Shakespeare Co	
2021	Because the Night	Polonius	Malthouse Theatre, Melbourne	
2022	K-BOX	George	Malthouse Theatre, Melbourne	
2022	An Indigenous Trilogy, Part 2: Masterpiece		La Mama, Melbourne	
2023	Romeo and Juliet	Peter	Royal Botanic Gardens, Melbourne with Australian Shakespeare Co	
2023	MI:WI 3027		Carlton Courthouse, Melbourne with La Mama	
2023	Animal Farm		Northcote Town Hall Arts Centre, Melbourne with Darebin Arts Speakeasy / Bloomshed	
2023	Much Ado About Nothing	Antonio	Australian Shakespeare Co	
2024	A Midsummer Night's Dream	Puck	Royal Botanic Gardens, Melbourne with Australian Shakespeare Co	
2024; 2025	37	The General	Bille Brown Theatre, Brisbane with MTC	
2025	Three Sisters		Theatre Works, Melbourne	
2025	Songs and Sketches by Barry Dickins		Theatre Works, Melbourne	
2025	Much Ado About Nothing	Leonato / Ensemble	Southbank Theatre, Melbourne with MTC	
2025	Lazarus	Various roles	Yirramboi Festival	
2026	Pride and Prejudice		Malthouse Theatre, Melbourne with Bloomshed	
2026	Some Secrets Should Be Kept Secret		La Mama, Melbourne	

=== As director ===
Year	Title	Role	Notes	Ref.
2006	Been So Long	Director	Bunka, Adelaide	
2006–2007	Osama the Hero	Director	Old Fitzroy Theatre, Sydney, Carlton Courthouse, Melbourne with Tamarama Rock Surfers, La Mama & The Rabble	
2007	Dreaming	Director	Illawarra Performing Arts Centre	
2023	The Crucible	Co-Director	Melbourne Athenaeum with Australian Shakespeare Co	
