= Blazey Best =

Australian actress

- Occupation: Actress

Blazey Best is an Australian actress. She has a long stage career including performances as Cornelius and Emily in Then the Mountain Comes at the Australian Museum in 1994, as Tessa in Chair in a Landscape at the Q Theatre in 1995, as Cressida in Troilus and Cressida at the Playhouse in 2000, as Sybil in Fawlty Towers: The Play at Roslyn Packer Theatre in 2016, as Rose in Gypsy at Hayes Theatre in 2018 and as Amanda Wingfield in The Glass Menagerie at the Ensemble Theatre in 2025, She playe Medea in Kate Mulvany and Anne-Louise Sarks's reinterpretaion of Medea at the Belvoir Downstairs Theatre in 2012 for which she won the best actress award at the 2012 Sydney Theatre Awards.

She starred in the debuts of Brendan Cowell's early plays Men and Happy New at the Old Fitzroy Theatre in Woolloomooloo in 2000 and 2001 respectively and ATM at the Sydney Festival in 2002,

Her stage debut was as Katherine in Henry V with the Australian Theatre for Young People, for which she had originally asked if she could audition for the role of Henry.

Best has performed in musical theatre including in Hedwig and the Angry Inch, touring in 2006 and B-Girl at the Playhouse, Sydney Opera House in 2015 both alongside iOTA.

Best moved into directing with King of Pigs at the Old Fitzroy Theatre in 2018. She directed Tell Me on a Sunday at the Hayes Theatre in 2024.

Best featured in the films Ten Empty and Powder Burn. On TV she was in Good Cop/Bad Cop and Between Two Worlds.
