= Daniel Frederiksen =

Australian actor

- Born: Australia
- Occupation: Actor
- Years active: 2002–present

Daniel Frederiksen is an Australian actor who has worked in television, film and live theatre.

== Early life and education ==
Frederiksen grew up in Metcalfe, Victoria. He moved to Sydney to study at the National Institute of Dramatic Art.

== Career ==
=== Film and television ===
Frederiksen played minor parts in the television shows Young Lions (2000), Blue Heelers (2002) and Mermaids (2003). He secured his first major television role as part of the cast of Australian series Stingers in its seventh season, playing Leo Flynn. He received a Logie Award nomination in the category of Most Popular New Male Talent for his work on Stingers in 2004. He later played the lead in the ABC miniseries Bastard Boys in 2007, and received an AFI Award nomination as Best Lead Actor for his portrayal of Australian politician Greg Combet. He appeared in a 2013 episode (S2:E1) of Miss Fisher's Murder Mysteries, "Murder Most Scandalous". In 2019 Frederiksen was cast in Upright, an Australian TV series created by Chris Taylor.

Frederiksen portrayed Wallow in the 2007 Sony Pictures film Ghost Rider. He starred in the Australian feature film Ten Empty (2009). Other film credits include feature films Closed for Winter (2009) and Summer Coda (2010) and an appearance in Underground: The Julian Assange Story (2012). Frederikson also played a trangendered mother in Pawno, which premiered at the Melbourne International Film Festival.

=== Theatre ===
In addition to his screen credits Frederiksen has performed extensively in Australian live theatre. For the Melbourne Theatre Company he has performed in Measure for Measure in 2000, Don Juan in Soho and Cheech in 2007, Dead Man's Cell Phone and Rockabye in 2009. Frederiksen portrayed Mark Antony in Bell Shakespeare's production of Julius Caesar (2011), touring around Australia and closing at the Sydney Opera House.

He was part of the original ensemble of Melbourne-based theatre company Red Stitch Actors Theatre, helping to establish the company. For Red Stitch he has appeared in many productions. Just some of these include playing the title role in Brendan Cowell's Ruben Guthrie (2011), Fatboy (2010), Leaves of Glass (2009), The Pain and the Itch (2008) and After Miss Julie (2007). In 2008 Frederiksen received a Melbourne Green Room nomination as Best Male actor for his performance in an independent production. In 2009 he directed On Ego at Red Stitch.

In 2013 he performed the role of Giles in Travis Cotton's play Robots vs Art and Neil Labute's Fat Pig. In 2016 he was part of the Australian cast of Matilda the Musical, playing Matilda's nasty father.

== Filmography ==
=== Film ===
Year	Title	Role	Notes
2007	Ghost Rider	Wallow	
2008	Ten Empty	Elliot	
2009	Closed for Winter	Martin	
2010	Summer Coda	Miklos	
2013	Vessel	Quentin	
2015	Pawno	Paige Turner	
2020	The Dry	Dr. Leigh	
2022	Petrol	Robert	

=== Television ===
Year	Title	Role	Notes
2002	Young Lions	Chris Doone	2 episodes
2002–2003	Blue Heelers	Dr. Josh Carmichael	7 episodes
2003	Mermaids	Randy	TV film
2003–2004	Stingers	Leo Flynn	58 episodes
2007	Bastard Boys	Greg Combet	Miniseries
2012	Underground: The Julian Assange Story	Wayne	TV film
2013	Miss Fisher's Murder Mysteries	Sidney Fletcher	3 episodes
2013	Underbelly	Alexander	Episode: "Squizzy Tempts Fate"
2013	Redfern Now	Detective Harrison	Episode: "Babe in Arms"
2019–2022	Upright	Andy Adams	8 episodes
2021	Fires	Raf Gordon	Episode #1.6
2022	Joe vs. Carole	Lucas Field	Episode: "The Tiger King"
2024	Exposure	Barry	4 episodes
