= Peta Murray =

Australian writer

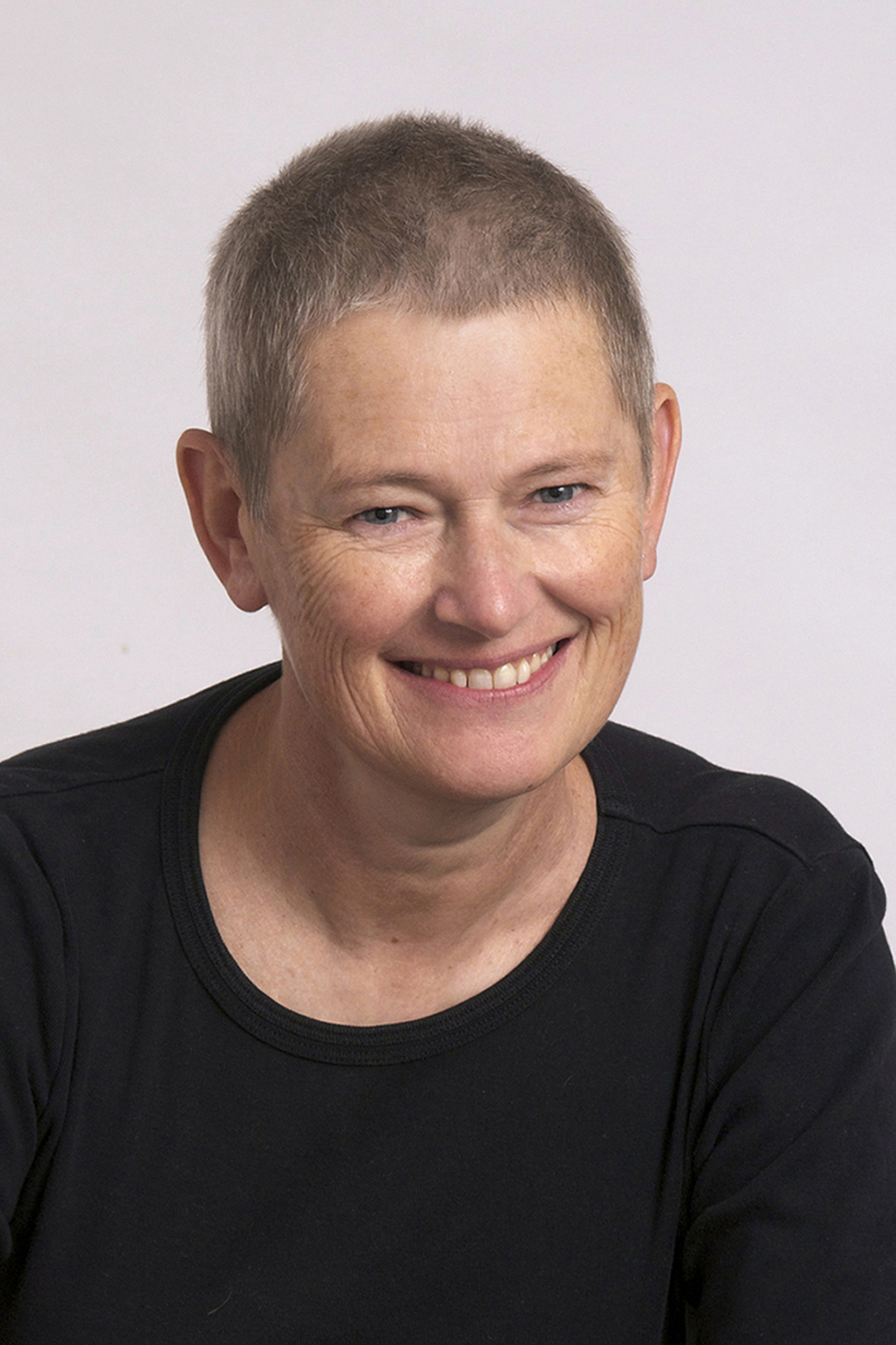
- Peta Murray in 2012
- Born: 1958 (age 67–68); Sydney, New South Wales, Australia
- Occupations: Playwright and short story writer
- Writing career
- Notable awards: 2001 Victorian Premier's Literary Awards – Prize for Drama

Peta Murray is an Australian writer. Best known as a playwright, she also writes short stories and essays and is a freelance dramaturg, director and occasional performer. She leads a parallel life as a teacher of creative writing and late-blooming academic researcher, in the higher education sector.

== Early life and education ==
Peta Murray graduated from Killara High School, Sydney in 1975.

She graduated from the University of New South Wales School of Drama, and went on to complete her Diploma of Education at the University of Sydney.

== Career ==
Following her graduation, Murray then began work as a high-school teacher of English and History, but remained involved in fringe and community theatre throughout her teaching career.

In 1989 she began writing full-time. Several of her plays were subsequently published by Currency Press. Her short stories have been published by Sleepers and Scribe.

== Playwright ==
Murray's first play, The Procrastinator, was produced by the Griffin Theatre Company in 1981. Her best-known play, Wallflowering, was workshopped at the Australian National Playwrights' Conference in 1988, and went on to have numerous productions in Australia and overseas. Other works include Salt, Spitting Chips, an adaptation of Tim Winton's novella Blueback, The Procedure, and The Keys to the Animal Room produced by Junction Theatre Company in South Australia.

Community theatre works include This Dying Business produced by Junction Theatre Company and The Law of Large Numbers by Mainstreet Theatre company in Mount Gambier. In 2006, she wrote Room, for Playworks and the Melbourne Writers Festival. In 2010, two "micro-plays" featured in Finucane & Smith's The Carnival of Mysteries at the Melbourne International Arts Festival. She has since developed and produced an epic new work for performance entitled Things That Fall Over: an (anti-)musical of a novel inside a reading of a play, with footnotes, and oratorio-as-coda. This was presented as a marathon of an extravaganza over five hours at Footscray Community Arts Centre on 1 March 2014 to mark International Women's Day. It featured a women's community choir working alongside well known artists and performers including Caroline Lee, Margaret Dobson, Liz Welch, Lisa Maza, and, as Verity in the musical coda, Swansong!!! The Musical!!! the legendary Margret RoadKnight. Music was composed by Peta Williams, choreography was by Robin Laurie, and musical direction was by Jo Trevathan.

In 2016, Murray made first forays into live art performance and installation-based work. She presented Litanies for the Forgetful as part of the embOLDen exhibition at Footscray Community Arts Centre, and returned the following year to perform Missa Pro Venerabilibus: A Mass for the Ageing, alongside Robin Laurie and Heather Horrocks. This project was staged as part of Melbourne Fringe Festival, and made in collaboration with scenographers Rachel Burke and Jane Murphy, with whom Murray continues to work.

In 2018, she presented vigil/wake at Arts House, North Melbourne, under the banner of the Mere Mortals season. This work, first staged as part of the Melbourne International Festival project, Survival Skills for Desperate Times, continues to evolve. A tourable pop-up version was presented at the Public Health Palliative Care International Conference, in Leura, NSW.

In 2019, Murray returned to playwriting, with the premiere season of an immersive and participatory work for children, On Our Beach, created for and staged in Fremantle, Western Australia, by Spare Parts Puppet Theatre. It was directed by Philip Mitchell, designed by Cecile Williams, and featured original music by Lee Buddle.

== Other activities ==
Murray has worked as a freelance dramaturg and director, and taught playwriting at the University of Melbourne, RMIT University and Melbourne's CAE as co-facilitator of the Black Writers Lab (now BlackWrights), a program run by the Ilbijerri Theatre Company.

In 2010, Murray co-founded, with clinical psychologist Kerrie Noonan, the not-for-profit arts-and-health organisation The GroundSwell Project. Its focus was on challenging Australia's culture of medicalised, institutionalised death and dying, and promoted a public health approach to deliver increased agency and broader choices at end-of-life. Murray served this organisation for many years in a pro bono capacity as its Creative Director, before both she and Noonan stepped away in 2019. In the early years of the organisation, Murray and Noonan ran three successful iterations of The Drama Project with students and Drama Teacher Nicole Bonfield at Penrith Selective High School. In its first year, its intergenerational arts-and-health project, "Rain-dancing For Beginners", conducted in partnership with MND NSW and won a 2010 Excellence in the Arts in Palliative Care award at the Art of Good Health and Wellbeing, Second International Arts and Health Conference, in Melbourne. The Drama Project was later the subject of a documentary by filmmaker Jordan Byron. In its early years, The Groundswell Project also delivered the FilmLife in partnership with the Organ and Tissue Authority, Busting Cancer – a body casting project in Western Sydney for women, and events within the Hidden program at Sydney's Rookwood Cemetery. Murray also devised and ran workshops on "Writing Loss", while Noonan's focus included research projects such as the development of the first national Australia-wide Death Literacy Index, and community programs including "Ten Things To Know Before You Go". They later established an annual event, Dying to Know Day, since held in August each year.

Since 2010, Murray has also completed a Diploma of Creative Industries at Victoria University and two postgraduate degrees, a Master of Arts in playwriting through QUT and a creative practice-based PhD through RMIT University. Her doctoral project "Essayesque Dismemoir: w/rites of elder-flowering" employed variations of the performance essay to devise participatory nonfiction on the embodied experience of ageing. As part of her project, awarded in 2017, she produced a triptych of new works, under the title Ware With A Translucent Body.

Since 2018, Murray has held an appointment as a Vice-Chancellor's Postdoctoral Research Fellow in the School of Media & Communication at RMIT, where she is an active member of the non/fictionLab, and one third of the research collective, The Symphony of Awkward, with Stayci Taylor and Kim Munro. The Symphony of Awkward conducts practice-led research in an emergent-field they call diarology.

== Awards ==
Her play Salt won the 2001 Louis Esson Prize for Drama in the Victorian Premier's Literary Awards.

Murray has won Australian Writers' Guild awards for Spitting Chips (Theatre in Education/Community Theatre Category, 1990), The Keys to the Animal Room, (Theatre in Education/Community Theatre Category and Major Award Winner, 1994) and Blueback (Theatre for Young People, 2000).

In 2001, Murray was awarded an Australian Government Centenary Medal for Services to Society and Literature.
