= Tom Budge =

Australian actor (born 1982)

- Born: Thomas Budge; 15 March 1982 (age 44); Melbourne, Victoria, Australia
- Occupation: Actor
- Years active: 1999–present

Thomas Budge (born 15 March 1982) is an Australian television and film actor.

== Early life ==
Budge was born in Melbourne, Victoria.

== Career ==
=== Screen ===
Early in his acting career, Budge appeared in a number of Australian television shows, beginning with a recurring guest role in long-running soap opera Neighbours. He also had regular roles in children's series Round the Twist, playing Tiger Gleeson in seasons 3 and 4, from 2001 to 2002, and comedy-drama series Shock Jock as Clive Rank from 2001 to 2002.

Budge then transitioned from television to film, making his silver screen debut alongside Nathan Phillips and Luke Carroll as Pickles in 2002 sports drama Australian Rules. He reunited with Phillips in 2003 comedy film Take Away, which also starred Rose Byrne, Vince Colosimo and Stephen Curry. That same year, he played the role of Normie Norman in comedy film The Honourable Wally Norman.

In 2005, Budge appeared in western film The Proposition, playing opposite Guy Pearce and Ray Winstone as Samuel Stoat and in Three Dollars with David Wenham and Frances O'Connor. 2006 saw him appear in several films, including World War II feature Kokoda with Angus Sampson and Ewen Leslie and romantic drama Candy, alongside Heath Ledger and Abbie Cornish. For his performance as Trev in 2006 thriller Last Train to Freo, he was nominated for Best Supporting Actor at both the Australian Film Institute Awards and the Film Critics Circle of Australia Awards.

In 2008, Budge joined the cast of Ten Empty, including Jack Thompson and Brendan Cowell, playing the role of Brett. That same year, he was tipped to play AC/DC guitarist Angus Young in a movie about the former AC/DC lead singer Bon Scott. From 2008 to 2009, Budge appeared in several episodes of the television drama East of Everything, before landing a role in 2009 musical comedy drama Bran Nue Dae with Geoffrey Rush and Jessica Mauboy. He then played PFC Ronnie Gibson in Steven Spielberg-produced HBO World War 2 miniseries The Pacific, which aired in 2010.

Budge featured opposite Deborah Mailman in 2012 biographical TV movie Mabo, about Torres Strait Islander activist Eddie Mabo, who campaigned for Indigenous land rights. He then appeared opposite Ewan McGregor and Brenton Thwaites in 2014 crime drama film Son of a Gun, playing the role of Josh. In 2015, he portrayed Cliff Sutton in the World War I miniseries Gallipoli, starring Kodi Smit-McPhee. He then had an ongoing role as Jeremy in comedy-drama series The Wrong Girl, with Jessica Marais, in 2017.

In 2019, Budge played town mayor Mr. Frankly in Mirrah Foulkes’ directorial debut feature film Judy and Punch, alongside Damon Herriman and Mia Wasikowska. He then played the regular role of Shane in sci-fi mystery drama series Bloom, opposite Bryan Brown, Jacki Weaver and Phoebe Tonkin. In early 2020, it was announced that Budge had been cast in an undisclosed role in The Lord of The Rings: The Rings of Power on Amazon Prime. In March 2021, he walked away from the role due to creative differences, saying that "after recently seeing the first episodes shot over the last year, Amazon has decided to go in another direction with the character I was portraying."

Budge had a recurring guest role in comedy-drama series Upright in 2022, playing Geert, opposite Tim Minchin. In 2024, he starred as writer/producer Guy Chambers in the Robbie Williams biographical musical drama film Better Man, reuniting with his Judy and Punch co-star Herriman. That same year, he played Simpkins in comedy drama film Runt, alongside Jai Courtney and Jack Thompson.

=== Stage ===
Budge has also performed for the stage, including in the Belvoir production of The Lieutenant of Inishmore, which earned him a Best Supporting Actor nomination at the 2004 Helpmann Awards. In 2013, he was again nominated for Best Supporting Actor in Eddie Perfect’s The Beast, with the Melbourne Theatre Company.

Budge won rave reviews for both his roles as Clov in Andrew Upton and Hugo Weaving’s 2015 production of Samuel Beckett’s Endgame with the Sydney Theatre Company, and The Rasputin Affair at Sydney's Ensemble Theatre in 2017.

=== Music ===
When not acting, Budge has said that he enjoys playing guitar and singing. He also performs in The Tom Budge Band, and has toured both in Australia and internationally. In the 2005 film The Proposition, Budge's character sang the Canadian folk song "Peggy Gordon", which can be found on YouTube.

== Filmography ==
=== Film ===
Year	Title	Role	Notes	Ref.
2002	Australian Rules	Pickles	Feature film	
2003	The Night We Called It a Day (aka All the Way: The Kidnapping of a Music Legend)	Geeky Kid	Feature film	
2003	The Honourable Wally Norman	Normie Norman	Feature film	
2003	Take Away	Tarquin	Feature film	
2003	The Rouseabout	Tom	Short film	
2003	Pity 24		Short film	
2004	Apprentice			
2004	Crash	Phil	Feature film	
2005	Three Dollars	Chicken Shop Assistant	Feature film	
2005	The Proposition	Samuel Stoat	Feature film	
2005	The Opposite of Velocity	Trevor		
2006	Candy	Schumann	Feature film	
2006	Kokoda (aka Kokoda: 39th Battalion)	Johnno	Feature film	
2006	The Cow Thief	Robert	Short film	
2006	Last Train to Freo	Trev	Feature film	
2007	Damned	Abraham		
2008	Ten Empty	Brett	Feature film	
2008	$9.99	Bisley (voice)	Animated feature film	
2009	Everything's Alright	Crash Austin		
2010	Bran Nue Dae	Slippery	Feature film	
2011	Larry Crowne	Stan	Feature film	
2014	Son of a Gun	Josh	Feature film	
2019	Judy and Punch	Mr Frankly	Feature film	
2024	Better Man	Guy Chambers	Feature film	
2024	Runt	Simpkins	Feature film	

=== Television ===
Year	Title	Role	Notes	Ref.
1999; 2000	Neighbours	Tim Harrison	4 episodes	
2000	The Games	Michael	1 episode	
2000–2001	Round the Twist	Tiger Gleeson	24 episodes	
2001	Horace & Tina	Cameron	1 episode	
2001–2002	Shock Jock	Clive Rank	26 episodes	
2003	Welcher & Welcher	Jake Buzzo	1 episode	
2005	The Glenmoore Job	Peter	TV series	
2008–2009	East of Everything	Dale	7 episodes	
2009	The Pacific	Ronnie 'The Kid' Gibson	Miniseries	
2012	Mabo	Greg McIntyre	TV film	
2015	Gallipoli	Cliff Sutton	Miniseries, 7 episodes	
2016	Wentworth	Daz	1 episode	
2017	Here Come the Habibs	Neville	1 episode	
2017	The Wrong Girl	Jeremy	10 episodes	
2017	The Doctor Blake Mysteries	Walter Gregan	1 episode	
2018	True Story with Hamish & Andy	Brett	1 episode	
2019	Glitch	Rob	1 episode	
2019	Utopia	Martin	1 episode	
2019	Secret Bridesmaids' Business	Detective McKenzie	2 episodes	
2019–2020	Bloom	Shane	10 episodes	
2020	How to Stay Married	Dale	1 episode	
2021	Artist 2 Artist	William (voice)		
2022	Upright	Geert	2 episodes	

== Theatre ==
Year	Title	Role	Notes	Ref.
2003	The Lieutenant of Inishmore	Davey	Belvoir Street Theatre	
2013	The Beast		Southbank Theatre. Melbourne with MTC	
2015	Endgame	Clov	Sydney Theatre Company	
2017	The Rasputin Affair	Felix	Ensemble Theatre	

== Awards ==
Year	Award	Category	Nominated work	Result	Ref.
2004	The Lieutenant of Inishmore	Helpmann Awards	Best Supporting Actor	Nominated	
2006	Last Train to Freo	AFI Awards	Best Actor in a Supporting Role	Nominated	
2006	Last Train to Freo	FCCA Awards	Best Actor in a Supporting Role	Nominated	
2013	The Beast	Helpmann Awards	Best Supporting Actor	Nominated	
