= Marcia Gardner (writer) =

Australian television writer and producer

- Education: Tisch School of the Arts, New York University
- Occupations: Screenwriter, television producer
- Years active: 1996–present
- Notable work: Wentworth; Sea Patrol; High Country

Marcia Gardner is a writer and producer. She is best known for Wentworth, High Country and Sea Patrol. Gardner has produced over one hundred hours of television in Australia.

== Education ==
Gardner graduated with an honours degree from New York's University Tisch School for the Arts.

== Career ==
In 2013, after the first season of Wentworth aired, it was announced that the second season was headed into production with Gardner joining the series as script producer and writer.

In March 2022, the series Bali 2002 was announced with its crew and cast being announced with Gardner serving as a writer for the series. In November 2022, Gardner was announced as part of the writing team for Channel 10 series North Shore.

In 2023, Gardner would serve as writer and creator of Foxtel drama High Country. High Country's creators Gardner and John Ridley pitched the idea to the late Brian Walsh in 2020 with the series becoming Walsh's last commissioned program for Foxtel and Binge prior to his passing. The High Country production team for series one consisted of a reunited Wentworth crew. In 2026 the series return for a second series.

== Filmography ==
Writer
| Year | Title | Role | Notes |
|---|---|---|---|
| 2024-26 | High Country | Creator / Writer | 16 episodes |
| 2023 | North Shore | Writer | 1 episode |
| 2022 | Bali 2002 | Writer | |
| 2014-21 | Wentworth | Writer | 18 episodes |
| 2014 | Celblok H | Original Script | 1 episode |
| 2014 | The Doctor Blake Mysteries | Writer | 2 episodes |
| 2007-11 | Sea Patrol | Writer | 8 episodes |
| 2006 | Blue Heelers | Story editor | 11 episodes |
| 2000-02 | Stingers | Writer/Editor | 38 episodes |
| 1996-98 | Medievac | Writer | 8 episodes |
| 1998 | All Saints | Writer | 2 episodes |
| 1996 | Heartbreak High | Writer | 1 episode |

Producer
| Year | Title | Role | Notes |
|---|---|---|---|
| 2024-26 | High Country | Producer | 16 episodes |
| 2014-21 | Wentworth | Script Producer | 90 episodes |
| 2008-11 | Sea Patrol | Script Producer | 55 episodes |
| 2003-04 | Stingers | Script Producer | 68 episodes |
