= Plum (TV series) =

Australian television drama series

- Genre: Drama
- Created by: Brendan Cowell
- Inspired by: Plum by Brendan Cowell
- Written by: Brendan Cowell; Fiona Seres
- Directed by: Wayne Blair; Margie Beattie
- Starring: Brendan Cowell; Asher Keddie; Jenni Baird; María Dupláa; Matt Nable; Susie Porter
- Country of origin: Australia
- Original language: English
- No. of seasons: 1
- No. of episodes: 6

Production
- Executive producers: Brendan Cowell; Louise Smith
- Producers: John Edwards; Dan Edwards; Jonathan Duncan
- Production locations: Sutherland Shire, New South Wales
- Running time: 49–54 minutes
- Production companies: Roadshow Rough Diamond; Modern Convict Films

Original release
- Network: ABC TV
- Release: 20 October 2024 – present

Plum is a 2024 Australian television drama for ABC Television, released on 20 October 2024. Created and written by Brendan Cowell, the series follows Peter Lum, a retired former rugby league player who is diagnosed with a brain disorder following years of concussions he suffered on the field. The story is inspired by Cowell's novel of the same name.

== Synopsis ==
After a career in rugby league, Peter 'The Plum' Lum is diagnosed with a brain disorder, but does not reveal it to family and friends. However when his ex-wife becomes very concerned with erratic behaviour and his son Gavin, who is being head-hunted by rugby league teams, he starts to realise his father is not the same person he used to be, and the game might be to blame. Plum attempts to turn his life around, as journalist Dana Hanlon goes on a fact finding mission to reveal the dangers of chronic traumatic encephalopathy.

== Cast ==
The cast was announced when the series went into production on 17 January 2024.

- Brendan Cowell as Peter 'The Plum' Lum
- Asher Keddie as Renee Lum
- Jenni Baird as Dana Hanlon
- Matt Nable as Dave
- Nicholas Cassim as Albert Lum
- Vincent Miller as Gavin Lum
- María Dupláa as Charmayne
- John Tui as Brick
- Matthew Sunderland as Charles Bukowski
- Adolphus Waylee as Kutiote
- Josh McConville as Squeaky
- Wayne McDaniel as Magic Matt
- Susie Porter as Sarah Lum
- Jemaine Clement as Oliver
- Janet Anderson as Tatania
- Andrew Ryan as Bobby D
- Charlotte Friels as Sylvia Plath
- Peter Phelps as Mo Hanlon

Former NRL players Andrew Johns, James Graham, Mark Carroll and Paul Gallen make special cameo appearances in the series.

== Production ==
On 17 January 2024, it was announced that the series had gone into production, securing its funding from Screen Australia and Screen NSW.

Plum was filmed in and around the area of the Sutherland Shire of Sydney.

ABC had revealed its 2024 drama slate on 9 May 2024, with Plum and series two of Bay of Fires. Plum was expected to air in 2025 but was pushed forward to air in October 2024.

== Episodes ==
All episodes were released on 20 October 2024 via ABC iview.

Number	Title	Directed by	Written by	iview air date	Terrestrial air date	Aus. Viewers
Episode 1	"Hurricane"	Wayne Blair	Brendan Cowell	20 October 2024	20 October 2024	484,000
Episode 2	"King of Cronulla"	Wayne Blair	Brendan Cowell	20 October 2024	27 October 2024	343,000
Episode 3	"Storm"	Wayne Blair	Fiona Seres	20 October 2024	3 November 2024	270,000
Episode 4	"The Gap"	Margie Beattie	Brendan Cowell	20 October 2024	10 November 2024	258,000
Episode 5	"The Tree"	Margie Beattie	Fiona Seres	20 October 2024	17 November 2024	268,000
Episode 6	"Impact Player"	Margie Beattie	Brendan Cowell	20 October 2024	24 November 2024	244,000

== Reception ==
David Knox of TV Tonight gave the series four stars, saying that it was a labour of love for Cowell who had written the novel. Knox cited the viewing experience and said that people should be "ready to confront what lies beneath the surface".

Paul Dalgarno of ScreenHub gave the series 3½ stars, saying that Cowell has been writing "about how blokey life leaves successful Sydney men adrift and unsatisfied spiritually since his days contributing to Love My Way". Dalgarno cited the viewing experience and said that sport in Australia is a industry worth more than a billion dollars, and that sport does not prepare people for death, while poetry does.
