= Shock Jock (Australian TV series) =

Australian comedy television series

- Genre: Comedy
- Created by: Tim Ferguson; Marc Gracie
- Written by: Chris Thompson
- Starring: Matthew Dyktynski; Michael Veitch; Rod Mullinar; Tom Budge; Sancia Robinson; Fiona Todd; Cassandra Magrath
- Country of origin: Australia
- Original language: English
- No. of seasons: 2

Production
- Running time: 30 minutes
- Production companies: Mockingbird; Mondayitis Productions

Original release
- Network: TV1
- Release: 2001 – 2002

Shock Jock is an Australian television comedy series on TV1. The series lasted for two series between 2001 and 2002 and was created by comedian Tim Ferguson.

Ferguson starred along with Matthew Dyktynski, Michael Veitch, Tom Budge, Rod Mullinar, Sancia Robinson, Fiona Todd and Cassandra Magrath, with many well-known Australian actors and comedians in guest roles. Tiriel Mora joined the second season.

It focused on an Australian talkback radio station, CHAT-AM, in the 1980s. The introduction of FM radio in the early 1980s was leading to the slow demise of the AM band. CHAT-AM discovered shock jock Barry Gold (Matthew Dyktynski) and its fortunes were reversed as the station transformed into a popular tabloid show.

Shock Jock was the first original series produced for TV1.

The series was produced by Mockingbird and Mondayitis Productions and was distributed by Foster Gracie TV.

== Cast ==
- Tim Ferguson
- Matthew Dyktynski as Barry Gold
- Michael Veitch as Jack Piper
- Tom Budge as Clive Rank
- Rod Mullinar as Basil Hannigan
- Sancia Robinson
- Fiona Todd
- Cassandra Magrath as Steph Thom
- Tiriel Mora as Neville Roach
- Alex Menglet as Dieter Kohl (1 episode)
- Denise Scott as Miss Wanda (1 episode)
- Greg Stone as Gil (5 episodes)
- Jane Clifton as Joy Gold (1 episode)
- Jane Hall as Megan (1 episode)
- Krista Vendy as Yoni Shaktipat (1 episode)
- Syd Brisbane as Chip (1 episode)
- Tim Robertson as Dr Arnold Kipax (1 episode)

== See also ==
- List of Australian television series
