= ATM (play) =

2002 play by Brendan Cowell

- Written by: Brendan Cowell
- Original language: English
- Genre: Comedy
- Setting: In front of an ATM

Premiere
- Date premiered: 2002
- Place premiered: Bowlers' Club of NSW, Sydney Festival

ATM is a play by Australian actor and playwright Brendan Cowell that premiered in 2002. It features a series of encounters in front of an automatic teller machine. It was produced by Roguestar after being approached by Sydney Festival's new artistic director, Brett Sheehy.

ATM debuted at the 2002 Sydney Festival on 7 January as part of their Two Up season. It was written by Cowell, directed by Leland Kean and performed by Blazey Best, Natasha Beaumont, Anthony Hayes, Damon Herriman, Katherine Slattery and Darren Weller who play more than 50 different characters.

The Sydney Morning Herald's Stephen Dunne finished his review "The play isn't perfect yet — there's still some fat that could be trimmed, and the production drags slightly in the last half hour. Still, Cowell is an exciting and distinctive writer and, with this production, the Sydney Festival's decision to include new Australian writing has already paid off handsomely." In the Daily Telegraph Carrie Kablean describes it as "Fabulous writing that is both sharp and satirical, plus great performances from a six-strong cast playing multiple roles, and a money-money-money theme, add up to a wonderfully comi-tragic entertainment that holds a mirror to inner-city life" Alanna MacLean in the Canberra Times says "The piece is episodic and could do with less use of the blackout but there's genuine humour in the procession of sharply played lovers and losers." The Australian Jewish News's Peter Morrison notes "ATM is in fact more of a satirical revue than a play and as such it makes wonderful entertainment."

In 2003 it was staged at the Nick Enright Theatre by students from the WA Academy of Performing Arts, directed by Marcelle Schmitz. Ron Banks of the West Australian says "Cowell's writing can be sharp and edgy, but certain scenes could have benefited from some tighter editing" and finishes "But the play's title, with its suggestion that it will deal with our relationship to money, is never really fulfilled. In that sense, this ATM short-changes us, or gives us a counterfeit deal."
