= Observance (film) =

2015 Australian film

- Directed by: Joseph Sims-Dennett
- Written by: Joseph Sims-Dennett; Josh Zammit
- Produced by: Joseph Sims-Dennett; Josh Zammit
- Starring: Stephanie King; Lindsay Farris; Brendan Cowell
- Cinematography: Rodrigo Vidal-Dawson
- Edited by: Charles Ivory
- Music by: Haydn Walker; Adrian Sergovich
- Release date: 2015
- Running time: 83 minutes
- Country: Australia
- Language: English
- Budget: $11,000

Observance is a 2015 Australian film directed by Joseph Sims-Dennett. It premiered at the Fantasia International Film Festival in Montreal in July 2015.

== Synopsis ==
Parker is paid to move into a building and spy on a woman in her apartment.

== Cast ==
- Stephanie King as Tenneal/Subject 1
- Lindsay Farris as Parker Woodhouse
- Brendan Cowell as Employer
- Benedict Hardie as Charlie
- Tom O'Sullivan as Bret Buchanan
- John Jarratt as Snitch
- Roger Ward as Conspirator

== Reception ==
On review aggregator Rotten Tomatoes, the film has an approval rating of 71% based on 17 reviews.

The Hollywood Reporter says "the picture draws on everyone from Cronenberg and early Polanski to Shane Carruth in the construction of its existential mystery. While in the end many viewers will find that mystery frustratingly unresolved, many will be moved enough to talk about it; buzz at fests could well lead to an arthouse deal."

The Sydney Morning Herald's Jake Wilson gave it 3 stars and says "Farris modulates his uneasy reactions with skill, but never manages to turn Parker into an interesting character. A bit more humour, and a stronger sense of a society surrounding the main characters, might have allowed Sims-Dennett to lure us further into his sinister imaginative world."

Luke Buckmaster in the Guardian gave it a 3 star review and wrote "Observance feels poised on a knife edge, on some occasions tinkering on the precipice of excellence and on others feeling at risk of slipping into a cabin fever B movie. Somehow Sims-Dennett and his peculiar thriller stand their ground. Whatever you make of the film’s oblique thinking-person’s ending, and whether or not it cuts the mustard from a storytelling point-of-view, Observance is undoubtedly an impressive achievement."

Richard Scheib of Moria gave it 2 stars and noted "The great frustration about Observance is that it is all build-up and no third act. It never provides any answers as to what is going on. There is no explanation about the infection or where it is coming from – in fact, this only seems there in a couple of scenes but the film never pushes it for the sense of a growing sense of decay and horror as you get in Contracted and especially Thanatomorphose."
