= High Country (TV series) =

Australian television series

- Genre: Drama; Mystery drama; Crime drama
- Created by: Marcia Gardner; John Ridley
- Starring: Leah Purcell; Ian McElhinney; Sara Wiseman; Aaron Pedersen; Matt Domingo
- Composers: Cezary Skubiszewski and Jan Skubiszewski
- Country of origin: Australia
- Original language: English
- No. of seasons: 2
- No. of episodes: 16

Production
- Executive producers: Jo Porter; Rachel Gardner; Lana Greenhalgh; Penny Win; Marcia Gardner; John Ridley
- Producers: Pino Amenta; Sue Edwards
- Running time: 45 minutes
- Production companies: Curio Pictures; Rage Media

Original release
- Network: Binge; Showcase
- Release: 19 March 2024 – present

High Country is an Australian mystery drama series created by Marcia Gardner and John Ridley, which was broadcast from 19 March 2024 on Binge and Showcase. The series stars Leah Purcell, Ian McElhinney, Sara Wiseman, and Aaron Pedersen. On 11 September 2025, Foxtel announced a second season.

== Premise ==
When Sergeant Andrea 'Andie' Whitford is transferred to the town of Brokenridge in the Victorian High Country, she realises the mysterious cases of five missing people who have disappeared into the wilderness might be linked. As she delves further into the investigation, she begins to uncover a complex web of murder, deceit and revenge.

Series two, a new case draws Andie into a deeper more personal investigation that pushes her to the limit.

== Cast and characters ==
=== Main ===
- Leah Purcell as Sergeant Andrea 'Andie' Whitford
- Ian McElhinney as Retired Sergeant Sam Dryson
- Sara Wiseman as Helen Hartley
- Aaron Pedersen as Owen Cooper
- Geoff Morrell as Brian Harris
- Linda Cropper Rose De Vingy
- Henry Nixon as Damien Stark
- Luke McKenzie as Senior Constable Brett Sweet
- Matt Domingo as Constable Reza Bohrani
- Pez Warner as Kirra Hartley
- Pedrea Jackson as Ben Cooper
- Leah Vandenberg as Tammy Samson

=== Recurring ===
- Francis Greenslade as Dr Patrick Haber
- Annie Chiswell as Maddie Harris
- Catherine Glavicic as Bernice
- Nicholas Bell as Senior Sergeant Steven Cripps
- Nathaniel Dean as Nash Mason
- Jamie Tominy as Liam Mason
- Jess Harris as Rachel Griggs
- Shannon Berry as Sophie
- Melissa Jaffer as Liz Whitford
- Syd Brisbane as Scooter
- Stacy Clausen as Finn McKenzie

=== Guests ===
- Eddie Baroo as Lachlan Francis
- Fletcher Humphrys as Gary

=== Series 2: What Lies Beneath ===
- Brendan Cowell as Glenn Gilmour
- David Field as Jax Mason
- Chika Ikogwe as Diane Holt
- Michael Sheasby as Mitch Hamilton
- Ariadne Sgouros as Stella Cross
- Andrea Demetriades as Kat Pappas
- Ryan Corr as Leo Pappas
- Nadine Garner as Lynn McKenzie

== Production ==
High Country was developed by the creators of Wentworth, Marcia Gardner and John Ridley. The eight-part series, which was shot in 36 days, was commissioned for Foxtel, in association with Screen Australia, VicScreen, and its production company Curio Pictures. Filming commenced in April 2023, and set in the Victorian Alps, in the small town of Jamieson, a region rarely captured on screen. Foxtel Chief CEO, Graeme Mason believes that "High Country is sure to be a landmark television series". Jo Porter, Rachel Gardner, Lana Greenhalgh, Penny Win, Marcia Gardner and John Ridley serve as executive producers for the series.

High Country went into production for its second series, On 13 January 2026, Brendan Cowell, Ryan Corr and Nadine Garner were announced as new cast for the second series.

== Broadcast ==
High Country premiered on 19 March 2024 on Foxtel-on-demand service, Binge, followed by a television screening on Foxtel's Showcase on the same day. Episodes will be released on Tuesdays through Binge at noon, and Tuesday nights on Showcase at 8.30 pm.

On 3 May 2024 all eight episodes from the first season were made available in New Zealand on Three's streaming service, ThreeNow.

It was announced in June 2024, that the BBC had acquired the rights to broadcast the series in the UK; it premiered on 13 July 2024 on BBC One, airing its first four episodes in double bills over two weeks, before moving to BBC Two for its final four episodes, where it also in double bills for the remaining two weeks. All episodes were broadcast on Saturday nights. The entire series became available to stream on BBC iPlayer following the broadcast of the first episode.

On 21 August 2026, it was announced that the second series would air from 14 September 2026.

== Reception ==
Reviews for the series have been positive. David Knox of TV Tonight rated the series at 4 out of 5 stars, stating that "It’s fair to say the themes of High Country, being missing persons and associated crimes, have been explored in a range of other series, including Scandi-noir drama. Here it gets the First Nations treatment thanks to the fine talents of Leah Purcell." He did particularly praise Purcell's performance – "Purcell is outstanding as a grounded, diligent cop, using her smarts and following the law, whilst being challenged spiritually."

In a review for Screenhub, Anthony Morris gave the series a 4 out of 5 star rating and said that "The Victorian-shot series starring Leah Purcell stands out from the pack with its authentically shady sense of place."

Luke Buckmaster of The Guardian gave the series a rating of 3 stars out of 5 and commented on Purcell's "rock-solid" performance, mentioning that "Leah Purcell is as engaging as ever in a decent, if familiar crime series".

Following its debut in New Zealand, Tara Ward of the online magazine The Spinoff, said that "High Country is the ideal crime drama for a cold winter night", while she also praised the show for its setting, as well as the cast performances. On a negative note, she did criticise the series as being a clichéd mystery drama, stating, "'People disappearing into the wilderness' is… not exactly a new idea for a murder mystery. And it feels like High Country ticks every box in the genre," but she did ultimately recommend the series.

In a review for British newspaper The Daily Telegraph, Anita Singh rated the series at 3 out of 5 stars and said that "This crime thriller won’t be winning any awards for originality, but its heady tale of deceit, murder and magic realism is absorbing enough."

== Episodes ==
Series	Episodes	Originally released	
Series	Episodes	First released	Last released
1	8	19 March 2024	30 April 2024
2	8	14 September 2026	3 November 2026

=== Season 1 (2024) ===
No. overall	No. in season	Title	Directed by	Written by	Original release date
1	1	"Episode 1"	Kevin Carlin	Marcia Gardner & John Ridley	19 March 2024
Detective Sergeant Andrea 'Andie' Whitford is the new senior police officer in the small town of Brokenridge in the Victorian high country. She discovers an abandoned car on a remote forest road, registered to a Dr. Haber who's recently murdered his wife and children. While searching for Haber, Whitford finds human remains in a hollow tree. Whitford and team eventually find a naked, confused Haber who kills himself after warning Whitford "you don't know what's going on here". Both discoveries are aided by suggestions from local teacher and self-professed psychic Damien Stark. Whitford also deals with her immediate predecessor in Brokenridge, popular retiring Sergeant Sam Dryson, local larrikins the Mason brothers and her disgruntled daughter Kirra.
2	2	"Episode 2"	Kevin Carlin	Marcia Gardner & John Ridley	19 March 2024
The remains are of the missing female hiker who disappeared months earlier. An autopsy reveals a broken knife-tip in her chest. Dryson is obsessed with the case and tells Whitford he is convinced Stark is responsible, and that Stark's 'visions' are suppressed guilt. Whitford notes several people have been reported missing in the area in recent years, but Dryson dismisses her concerns. Whitford's wife Helen helps out with the accounts at an artists' retreat and becomes friendly with owner/manager Rose De Vigny. Rose encourages Helen to restart her abandoned artistic pursuits. Local woman Sarah Harris, wife of influential cattle farmer Bryan Harris, is reported missing and a large-scale search is organized. Whitford brings in Stark as a consultant.
3	3	"Episode 3"	Kevin Carlin	Marcia Gardner & John Ridley	26 March 2024
4	4	"Episode 4"	Kevin Carlin	Marcia Gardner & John Ridley	2 April 2024
5	5	"Episode 5"	Kevin Carlin	Marcia Gardner & John Ridley	9 April 2024
6	6	"Episode 6"	Beck Cole	Marcia Gardner & John Ridley	16 April 2024
7	7	"Episode 7"	Beck Cole	Marcia Gardner & John Ridley	23 April 2024
8	8	"Episode 8"	Kevin Carlin	Marcia Gardner & John Ridley	30 April 2024

=== Season 2 (2026) ===
No. overall	No. in season	Title	Directed by	Written by	Original release date
9	1	"Episode 1"	Lucy Gaffy	John Ridley	14 September 2026
10	2	"Episode 2"	Lucy Gaffy	Beck Cole & John Ridley	21 September 2026
11	3	"Episode 3"	Lucy Gaffy	Marcia Gardner	28 September 2026
12	4	"Episode 4"	Lucy Gaffy	John Ridley	5 October 2026

== Awards and nominations ==
Year	Association	Category	Recipient	Result	Ref.
2024	APRA Awards	Best Music for a Television Drama	Cezary Skubiszewski & Jan Skubiszewski	Won	
2025	AACTA Awards	Best Lead Actress in a Television Drama	Leah Purcell	Nominated	
2025	AWGIE Awards	Television – Limited Series	Marcia Gardner, John Ridley, and Beck Cole	Nominated	
2025	Screen Producers Australia	Drama Series Production of the Year	High Country	Nominated	
