= I Love You Too (2010 film) =

- Theatrical release poster
- Directed by: Daina Reid
- Written by: Peter Helliar
- Produced by: Yael Bergman; Laura Waters
- Starring: Brendan Cowell; Peter Dinklage; Yvonne Strahovski; Peter Helliar; Megan Gale
- Cinematography: Ellery Ryan
- Music by: David Hirschfelder
- Production company: Princess Pictures
- Distributed by: Roadshow Films
- Release date: 6 May 2010
- Running time: 103 minutes
- Country: Australia
- Language: English
- Budget: $6 million
- Box office: $2.1 million

I Love You Too is a 2010 Australian romantic comedy film, and the directorial film debut of Daina Reid. The screenplay was written by first-time writer Peter Helliar. It stars Brendan Cowell, Peter Dinklage, Yvonne Strahovski, Helliar, and Megan Gale, and was produced by Princess Pictures on a budget of A$6 million. Principal photography began on 4 May 2009 and took place in Melbourne.

== Plot ==
Jim (Brendan Cowell) is a thirty-three-year-old, emotionally stunted man who works at a miniature railway, and refuses to grow up. He lives in the granny flat at the back of his sister's house. Jim's pregnant sister Marie (Bridie Carter) struggles with her oafish brute of a husband, Owen (Travis McMahon).

Jim is unable to commit to his English girlfriend of three years, Alice (Yvonne Strahovski), who is very disappointed that Jim can't tell her that he loves her. Hoping to drive her boyfriend into saying those magical words, she considers taking a job in England, but to no avail.

After a drunken night on the town with his mate Blake (writer Peter Helliar), Jim unsuccessfully attempts to steal a car, owned by the vertically challenged Charlie (Peter Dinklage). Discovering an undelivered love letter Charlie wrote to Francesca, Jim cajoles Charlie into helping him mend his relationship with Alice. Jim's first attempt at a love letter fails as he is unable to express the words so he copies Charlie's original letter and gives it to Alice. Alice knows that the words aren't Jim's and is not impressed. Jim returns to Charlie's place and Charlie realises Jim copied his letter. Charlie tells Jim the words have to come from him so over a long afternoon and bottles of shiraz, Jim manages to write many rough drafts but he screws up all his work and gives up.

Although Jim fails with Alice, he commits Charlie to deliver his 3-year-old love letter. Charlie reveals that Francesca is supermodel Francesca Moretti (Megan Gale) with whom he is obsessed. Luckily Moretti is in town on a promotional tour and Jim takes Charlie to her book signing. Charlie gets cold feet and leaves but Jim hand-delivers the letter.

Meanwhile, Charlie visits Alice and gives her a shoebox of Jim's writings, telling her, His handwriting's terrible, he writes like a doctor who lost both hands in the war. The words are coming; they're not quite there yet, but they're close.

Later that evening Francesca reads Charlie's letter then invites him for a drink at her hotel. The two enjoy a pleasant evening together.

Blake uses his influence to stall Alice's taxi ride to the airport to allow Jim to express his true feelings and to propose to her.

== Cast ==
- Brendan Cowell as Jim
- Peter Dinklage as Charlie
- Yvonne Strahovski as Alice
- Peter Helliar as Blake
- Megan Gale as Francesca
- Travis McMahon as Owen
- Bridie Carter as Marie
- Steve Bisley as Bill, Jim's boss
- Marshall Napier as Mechanic
- Nicholas Bell as Alice's Dad
- Angus Sampson as Thug
- Brett Tucker as Julian
- Toby Truslove as Racquetball Guy #1

There are also cameo appearances from some prominent Australians, including actor Rose Byrne and comedians Hamish Blake and Dave Lawson. Former Strange Idols and Rattling Sabres vocalist, Robert Price, makes a brief appearance as a policeman.

== Release ==
=== Critical reception ===
The film received mixed reviews. Review aggregator website Rotten Tomatoes reports that 54% of critics gave the film a positive review, based on 13 reviews, with an average score of 5.4/10.
