= North Shore (2023 TV series) =

2023 Australian TV series

- Genre: Mystery; Crime; Thriller
- Created by: Mike Bullen
- Written by: Marcia Gardner; Mike Bullen
- Directed by: Gregor Jordan
- Starring: John Bradley; Joanne Froggatt
- Composer: Stephen Rae
- Country of origin: Australia
- Original language: English
- No. of seasons: 1
- No. of episodes: 6

Production
- Executive producers: David Maher; David Taylor; Mike Bullen; Rick Maier
- Producer: Diane Haddon
- Cinematography: Geoffrey Hall
- Camera setup: Multi-camera
- Running time: 43–44 minutes
- Production companies: Beach Road Pictures; ITV Studios

Original release
- Network: Network 10; Paramount+
- Release: 10 May – 14 June 2023

North Shore is an Australian mystery crime thriller television series, which was created by Mike Bullen and premiered on 10 May 2023 on Network 10. The series is set in Sydney and stars John Bradley and Joanne Froggatt.

== Plot ==
A British and an Australian detective are forced to team up to investigate the murder of the British trade minister's daughter, after her body is found in Sydney Harbour. As they uncover the complex case throughout their investigation, their personalities and cultures clash.

== Cast ==
=== Main / regular ===
- Joanne Froggatt as Abigail Crawford
- John Bradley as D.S. Max Drummond
- Kirsty Sturgess as D.S. Meg Driscoll
- Dan Spielman as Simon Chalcott
- Rob Carlton as Lloyd Macklin
- Matt Passmore as Greg Hardy
- Rhys Muldoon as D.C.I. Andrew Newell
- Toby Truslove as Justin Makepeace
- Claire Lovering as Tori
- Kristian Schmid as Hamish

=== Guests ===
- Diana McLean as Marjorie Abbott (3 episodes)
- Marta Kaczmarek as Dima (2 episodes)
- Michael Beckley as Gary Weaver (1 episode)
- Tasneem Roc as Claire Buchanan (1 episode)
- Helen Dallimore as Sarah Skillman (1 episode)

== Episodes ==
No.	Title	Directed by	Written by	Original release date
1	"Episode 1"	Gregor Jordan	Mike Bullen	May 10, 2023
The body of Sophie Chalcott, daughter of UK Minister for Trade Abigail Crawford, is discovered dead in the water. Detective Sergeant Max Drummond, a British police officer, is sent to Sydney to assist with the investigation. Drummond meets the Sydney police team, including DS Meg Driscoll, the lead detective on the case, and the parents to identify the body. The autopsy reveals that drowning was not the cause of death and it becomes a murder inquiry. It is revealed in a flashback that Sophie was the daughter of Greg Hardy, the leader of the Australian Labor Party, not Simon Chalcott of her name, nor Abigail Crawford. It came to light when Sophie was diagnosed with hypertrophic cardiomyopathy, a heritable disease that neither Abigail nor Simon have.
2	"Episode 2"	Gregor Jordan	Mike Bullen	May 17, 2023
Sophie was seen at 11pm leaving a bar on the night of her disappearance, but no trace of her movements after that have been found. The toxicology report shows she had taken MDMA. No trace of Erica has been found since the withdrawal of money from Sophie's bank accounts. Abigail and Simon decide upon a press conference to appeal for information, which raises public sympathy and interest in the case. The Macklins are shown watching the press conference on TV, with Lloyd Macklin insisting on a family meeting immediately. It is revealed that Sophie and Erica were supplying drugs at the boat party, and Oscar, who was Erica's boyfriend, confirms that they habitually re-sold pills that he claims they sourced from an anonymous supplier. Greg Hardy's chief of staff, Justin Makepeace, is questioned by Drummond and Driscoll who have tracked the $20,000 that was in Sophie's account to a bank transfer originating from a consulting firm associated with Greg Hardy's election campaign. Greg reveals that he knew Sophie was his daughter and that the money was a bribe to leave Sydney until after the election. It is also revealed that Justin's alibi for the night in question is another man with whom he has a sexual relationship, who works at a Christian school and who is later questioned by Drummond and Driscoll posing as prospective parents: he confirms Makepeace's alibi. At a barbecue at the Macklin residence, Abigail comes under pressure to facilitate the Australia/UK trade deal by adjusting UK food standards to permit Australian beef exports, which Abigail resists. Abigail later receives a call from what appears to be Sophie's number, and Drummond receives an anonymous text message from someone claiming to know why Sophie was murdered.
3	"Episode 3"	Gregor Jordan	Mike Bullen	May 24, 2023
Erica is revealed as the person who messaged Drummond and meets him. She claims that her laptop was stolen in the previous break-in to the flat and that Sophie had concluded that the thieves must have been after her own laptop, given the sensitive information it contained. Erica gives Drummond the laptop, believing that its contents explain Sophie's death. The laptop contains information on the Macklin group, a complex web of companies having only one common director, Marjorie Abbott, an elderly lady who reveals that Lloyd Macklin grew up next door to her, later paid off her mortgage, and occasionally brings her documents to sign which she gladly does, having no idea what they are for. Lloyd denies any significance to the information contained on the laptop when later interviewed by Drummond and Driscoll, but later angrily instructs Tom and Oscar to find Erica by any means possible. Abigail has gained political popularity in the UK following a minor scandal that has weakened the Prime Minister; she is now favourite to replace him in a leadership contest, should the PM resign. Although the PM would prefer her to remain in Australia negotiating the trade deal personally, she opts to go back to the UK in order to bring Sophie's body home. She meets Greg Hardy before she leaves where they discuss Sophie. She later breaks down when Sophie's body is being moved for transport and changes her mind, cancelling the return. Drummond persuades Erica to meet again; she agrees on condition it's just the two of them, but Driscoll decides to ambush the meeting and arrest Erica, against Drummond's advice and without his foreknowledge.
4	"Episode 4"	Gregor Jordan	Mike Bullen	May 31, 2023
Erica is interviewed by the police; Drummond wants to make a formal complaint about her arrest. Oscar is arrested on a drugs charge, his smartphone reveals intimate photos of Sophie, which comes as a shock in due course to Erica. Greg Hardy and Justin meet Abigail and Ben (Abigail's political advisor) at her hotel to discuss the trade deal, but Justin and Ben to their surprise are told they are not needed further that evening; Greg and Abigail rekindle their long-dead romance. Justin reveals to Ben that Greg and Abigail have a prior romantic history, to Ben's surprise. Simon and Abigail visit Manly the next day to see where Sophie lived. Simon admits that he has a personal, illicit stake in the sale of a Queensland ranch owned by the Macklins, and that the AUS/UK trade deal is the reason the sale has not concluded, which has exposed him to potential losses of $2m. Abigail is furious and refuses to conclude the deal on the basis of saving Simon's investment, but agrees to talk up the deal on a TV interview scheduled for the next day: Simon is to exit his position as soon as this improves the share price. Drummond and Driscoll visit the Macklin house with a warrant to view CCTV footage on the night Sophie disappeared, but the CCTV system was removed some time previously, according to Macklin. Later they both attend a charitable function there, where they discuss their personal lives: Drummond is going through a difficult separation with his wife, while Driscoll is divorced with a son who lives with his father.
5	"Episode 5"	Gregor Jordan	Mike Bullen	June 7, 2023
Driscoll is shown returning home with a banker she met at the Macklin charity function, who mentions in passing the expense of the Italian stone used to tile the patio at the Macklin house. This reminds Driscoll of a sample of stone taken from Sophie's head injury during the autopsy, and after a search warrant is granted it seems the stone is a match at the subsequent forensic examination. Lloyd Macklin, Tom and Oscar conspire to present a story to the police in which Sophie confronts Tom with her infidelity with Oscar, a fight between the two men breaks out, and Sophie is accidentally knocked over, striking her head on the stone. Oscar and Tom panic and take her body to the jetty and throw her into the harbour. At a later meeting that includes Macklin's lawyer, Oscar agrees to assist in ensuring that the Macklins escape any charges by scapegoating himself in exchange for a bribe of $50,000 and an assurance that the charges he faces are non-serious. Macklin unexpectedly visits Abigail at her hotel where he shares information with her that unsettles her. He meets Greg while leaving, implying he knows the reason for his arrival. Later when Drummond updates Simon and Abigail on what happened to Sophie, Abigail surprises Drummond by appearing resolved to accept the story as it stands. Drummond meets Oscar and persuades him that Macklin does not have his best interests at heart; Oscar then changes his story to the police, saying that after Sophie's fall, he and Tom did not dispose of Sophie's body as previously claimed, that they left the house and returned to find it already gone.
6	"Episode 6"	Gregor Jordan	Mike Bullen	June 14, 2023
Abigail has announced a trade deal that is perceived to have rolled over to the Australians' advantage: Greg is blindsided by this, having expected that such an announcement would only take place after his predicted election victory. Abigail's reputation in the UK is also affected. Tom meets Oscar who is wearing a wire unknown to Tom. It emerges that Tom deliberately hit Sophie. He also refers to his father's belief that he possesses a trump card that can influence the legal process to protect Tom. Abigail, Greg, Justin and Ben meet to discuss the trade deal shock. She claims that the PM has promised her the position of Foreign Secretary if she aligns behind himself. Greg is sceptical that this sufficiently explains events. Drummond, who has been staying in Sydney with his sister-in-law Tori, has developed an affection with her as a result of his marital separation and Tori's growing distance with her own workaholic husband, Hamish, from whom she later demands a divorce. Simon confesses to Abigail that he did not exit his option position as promised and that he has made $4m on the announcement of the trade deal. Drummond, who has kept in contact with Marjorie, realises that the CCTV footage that would implicate Macklin will be at her house; the police search it and discover a hard drive which on examination confirms Oscar's story that Tom deliberately punched Sophie. What also emerges is that Simon knew about Sophie's real parentage: Sophie had told him of this previously, that Sophie had warned Simon to distance himself from Macklin due to Macklin's corrupt business practices, and that she intended to expose Macklin to the press. Simon realised that this would destroy his illicit bet on the outcome of the UK-AUS trade deal and communicated this previously to Lloyd Macklin who had invited him to the house. Simon coincidentally arrives where he discovers Sophie, still alive, on the patio, who he chooses to suffocate instead of permitting her to expose Macklin. This he admits privately to Abigail who insists on a divorce at a time compatible with her political ambitions. The footage of the real course of events is what had enabled Macklin to blackmail Abigail into agreeing the suboptimal UK-AUS trade deal. Simon Chalcott is arrested for Sophie's murder; Drummond privately informs Abigail of the course of events who is more concerned with the political fallout, and Lloyd Macklin is arrested for conspiracy to pervert the course of justice. Abigail announces a return to the UK at a press conference, which makes Drummond realise that her reaction on being told the truth implies that she already knew it. Drummond and Driscoll attend her son's football game, Drummond admits to a growing and reciprocated affection for Tori, Abigail returns to the UK, and Drummond is offered a secondment for a year in Sydney which he decides to accept after discussing the prospect with Tori. However upon agreeing this, the doorbell rings, and it is Drummond's wife who has unexpectedly arrived in the hope of repairing their marriage.
