= Sucker (film) =

- Directed by: Ben Chessell
- Written by: Lawrence Leung; Ben Chessell
- Produced by: Jason Byrne; Robyn Kershaw
- Starring: John Luc; Timothy Spall; Lily Sullivan
- Cinematography: Katie Milwright
- Edited by: Rodrigo Balart
- Music by: Paul Mac
- Production companies: Guilty Content; Robyn Kershaw Productions
- Release dates: 15 August 2015 (Melbourne International Film Festival); 1 December 2015 (Australia)
- Running time: 96 minutes
- Country: Australia
- Language: English

Sucker is a 2015 Australian comedy film directed by Ben Chessell, starring John Luc, Timothy Spall and Lily Sullivan.

== Cast ==
- John Luc as Lawrence
- Lily Sullivan as Sarah
- Timothy Spall as The Professor
- Jacek Koman as Riley
- Shaun Micallef as Harry
- Kat Stewart as Emma
- Lawrence Leung as The Real Lawrence Leung
- Thomas Vu as The Real Jeremy Fong
- Ferdinand Hoang as Leo
- Linda Schragger as Mai-Ling
- Adam Murphy as Principal
- Yang Li as Uncle Sam
- Louise Siversen as Val, Dodgy Bar Woman
- Eddie Baroo as Stu
- Jacinta Stapleton as Alice
- John Brumpton as Elmsley
- Syd Brisbane as Micky

== Release ==
The film premiered at the Melbourne International Film Festival on 15 August 2015. It was released in Australia on 1 December 2015.

== Reception ==
Rochelle Siemienowicz of SBS called the film "likable, geeky and gently funny rather than hilarious".

Glen Falkenstein of FilmInk rated the film $9.00 out of $20.00 and wrote that the film "just can't decide what it wants to be; its enjoyable confidence machinations often playing second-fiddle to a less than interesting love story."

Luke Buckmaster of The Guardian rated the film 2 stars out of 5, writing that "Spall is the film’s greatest asset but Luc’s performance is a more harmonious fit tonally. Like the film, he is pleasant, unprepossessing and nothing to write home about."

The Hollywood Reporter called the film an "episodic, uneven affair".

== See also ==
- Cinema of Australia
