= Happy New =

2001 play by Brendan Cowell

- Written by: Brendan Cowell
- Original language: English
- Genre: Comedy

Premiere
- Date premiered: 2001

Happy New is a play by Australian actor and playwright Brendan Cowell that premiered in 2001. It features two brothers, Danny and Lyle, who were locked in a chicken pen as children.

Happy New debuted at the Old Fitzroy Theatre in Woolloomooloo in July 2001 where it starred Cowell, Anthony Hayes and Blazey Best with The Sydney Morning Herald's Stephen Dunne calling it "a fascinating and bleakly funny journey through tragedy and despair." Colin Rose of the Sun Herald gave it 7/10 and says "Very strange but I enjoyed it a lot." In June 2004 it showed at The Store Room in Fitzroy North. There it was directed by Ben Harkin and featured Dai Paterson, Angus Sampson and Jude Beaumont. Kate Herbert from the Herald Sun says "Cowell's script accentuates the absurdity rather than the tragedy of this incredible story" and writes "The script needs a vigorous edit. It is so riddled with metaphor and analogy that it becomes impenetrable at times." The Age's Helen Thomson says "Despite a flawed and often over-written script, there is enormous energy and impact, and shocks that violently interrupt the comedy, at times and leave a powerful sense of menace." Bill Perrett in the Sunday Age finishes "The problem with Happy New is that it all goes pear-shaped in the second half, with speeches, particularly by Danny, becoming over-long and gratuitously florid as Cowell tries to stretch the whole thing into a comprehensive condemnation of The Australian Way of Life. A nice twist in the tail fails to redeem things."

In 2012 it played in London at the Old Red Lion, Islington with Joel Samuels, Alfred Enoch and Josie Taylor. Amy Yorston of the British Theatre Guide said "Whilst there are also some biting one-liners, I would not suggest viewing it as a comedy. The dark themes lend a macabre edge to the play and the ending, although brutal, is not a total surprise." This was followed by a run in June 2013 in the West End at Trafalgar Studios starring Samuels, William Troughton and Lisa Dillon and directed by Robert Shaw. Lauren Mooney of exeunt Magazine writes "Director Robert Shaw handles the slow reveal of information to the audience with skill, allowing the horror at the heart of things – it turns out the two boys were abandoned by their mother in a chicken coop for months on end before being taken into care and, as a result, have become celebrities of a sort – to unfold gradually." She says "Though Cowell’s play is crammed with ideas, Happy New doesn’t quite come together as a cohesive whole, and though Cowell’s writing is engagingly idiosyncratic, some of the dramatic devices he employs, like the use of a newsreader to convey plot information, feel a little hackneyed." William Moore gave it 3 stars in the Standard. He notes "Brendan Cowell’s script is littered with darkly comic turns of phrase and hints towards some serious themes of abandonment and social duty, but runs out of steam towards the end."
