= Ten Empty =

- Film poster
- Directed by: Anthony Hayes
- Written by: Brendan Cowell; Anthony Hayes
- Starring: Brendan Cowell; Geoff Morrell; Lucy Bell; Jack Thompson
- Release dates: June 2008 (Sydney); July 3, 2008 (Australia)
- Country: Australia
- Language: English
- Box office: A$49,015 (Australia)

Ten Empty is a 2008 Australian film directed by Anthony Hayes and starring Brendan Cowell, Geoff Morrell, Lucy Bell, and Jack Thompson.

== Cast ==
- Brendan Cowell as Shane Hackett
- Geoff Morrell as Ross
- Lucy Bell as Diane
- Jack Thompson as Bobby Thompson
- Tom Budge as Brett
- Daniel Frederiksen as Elliott

== Synopsis ==
Following the death of his mother to suicide, Elliot (Daniel Frederiksen) fled suburban Adelaide to work in Sydney ten years ago. He returns to his family home for the weekend to attend his new half-brother's christening, at which he will be made godfather.

Elliott’s father Ross (Geoff Morrell) has remarried his late wife's sister Diane (Lucy Bell). Elliott's younger brother Brett (Tom Budge) has locked himself away in his room, in a deep depression in a self-imposed silence. Elliot must navigate the tense and dysfunctional family dynamic.

== Production ==
The film was written by Anthony Hayes and Brendan Cowell, who were good friends. Hayes said they were interested in exploring Australian masculinity:

After The Castle there was a string of comedies trying to replicate that success with cardboard cut-out characters, which really annoyed me. That's what we were working against in Ten Empty. That surface wit. Men cracking jokes instead of dealing with their emotions. What happens when you run out of jokes? The people I grew up with kept things to themselves, but they'd open up too. The average Aussie bloke is not just a beer-swilling idiot, and we wanted to show that.

The film was shot in Adelaide.

== Release ==
The film premiered at the Sydney Film Festival on 29 June 2008. It continued on the Australian festival circuit, including the Melbourne International Film Festival in July 2008. It was officially released in Australian cinemas from 3 July 2008.

The film was released on DVD in Australia on 4 March 2009, by Madman Entertainment.

== Reception ==
Bernard Hemingway from Cinephilia rated the film two and a half stars, saying: "Some re-shaping of the script to give its characters depth of connection would have considerably improved this otherwise well-intentioned film."

FilmInk reviewed the film as follows: "Dark in tone and serious in nature, Ten Empty is a beautifully written, powerfully performed drama about Australia’s suburban heartland. ... the big-and-brave Ten Empty is a powerful and deeply moving drama that resounds with honesty and reverberates with emotional truth."

== See also ==
- Cinema of Australia
