= Melbourne Workers Theatre =

Former Australian theatre company

Melbourne Workers Theatre (MWT) was an Australian theatre company based in Melbourne, Australia.

The company was founded in 1987 by Patricia Cornelius, Steve Payne and Michael White.

It specialised in producing work from a left-wing stance, seeking to create work that "articulates flaws in the mainstream perception of Australian culture and identity, contesting how Australians think about themselves as a nation and as a people". Indigenous actor and director (later playwright) Jada Alberts participated in various projects with the theatre.

After several arts funding bodies removed their financial support, the company struggled financially, eventually closing in 2012.

== See also ==
- Andrew Bovell
- Junction Theatre Company
- New Theatre, Melbourne
