= Junction Theatre Company =

Theatre company in Australia

The Junction Theatre Company was South Australia's first professional community theatre company, founded in 1984. It was located in the Adelaide suburb of Thebarton, until its closure in 2002. Its touring productions were performed in schools, factories and other workplaces, with the aim of reaching sections of the community who may not otherwise access theatre. In its early days it was a proponent of the Art and Working Life funding program. Geoff Crowhurst was its most prominent artistic director.

== History ==
Junction Theatre Company was South Australia's first professional community theatre company, founded in 1983–4 by Malcolm Blaylock, "with a mission to bring important social and workplace issues to the forefront".

Geoff Crowhurst (23 March 1951 – 4 July 2009) was artistic director from 1990 until the closure of the company in 2001. Crowhurst was considered “a master of making theatre work for the good of whole communities”, and had an Arts South Australia Ruby Award category posthumously named in his honour, the Geoff Crowhurst Memorial Award, for individuals who make "an outstanding contribution to community cultural development”.

Through the use of its own venue, it also became known as having an important role in facilitating the work of smaller companies in South Australia.

== Art and Working Life funding ==
In its early days, Junction Theatre was one of the country's main proponents of work supported by the funding program Art and Working Life, along with companies such as Melbourne Workers Theatre in Victoria. The Art and Working Life funding program supported projects created in partnership with trade unions. It was a joint funding initiative by the Australia Council for the Arts and the Australian Council of Trade Unions, which funded and promoted cultural activities by artists, art workers and unions in the workplace as well as elsewhere. The program aimed to "encourage art practice and policy, informed by the concerns and issues affecting workers own lives and acknowledges working class cultural traditions and the multicultural nature of those traditions". It ran until 1986.

== Directors ==
Junction Theatre Company's first artistic director was Malcolm Blaylock.

The subsequent and artistic director was Geoff Crowhurst, who was in the role until the closure of the company in 2001. Geoff Crowhurst was considered “A master of making theatre work for the good of whole communities”, and had an Arts South Australia Ruby Award category posthumously named in his honour, the Geoff Crowhurst Memorial Award, for individuals who make "an outstanding contribution to community cultural development”.

== Touring ==
The Company created touring works in schools, factories and other workplaces, with an aim to “create theatre of a high artistic quality which is accessible to those sections of the community who have not traditionally participated in theatre as an accessible option for entertainment, learning and expressing issues”.

== Selected productions ==
- Next Year's Model (1984), about the gradual closure of the General Motors Holden plant in Woodville, South Australia (first production)
- The Keys to the Animal Room (1993) by Peta Murray, about an abusive marital relationship, which received the 1994 Gold AWGIE Award
- Hello Down There (1993), about the collapse of the State Bank of South Australia, which was named "Best Community Theatre for 1993" in The Advertiser
- Love Land and Money (2002), relating to themes of reconciliation and mining industries, co-presented by Adelaide Fringe and Tandanya National Aboriginal Cultural Institute (last production)
