= Stingers (TV series) =

Australian drama television series

- Genre: Crime drama Police procedural Action; Mystery thriller Neo-noir; Crime thriller Black comedy Comedy drama
- Created by: Guy Wilding; Mikael Borglund; Michael Messenger; Tony Morphett
- Starring: Peter Phelps; Kate Kendall; Anita Hegh; Joe Petruzzi; Roxane Wilson; Ian Stenlake; Jessica Napier; Jacinta Stapleton; Daniel Frederiksen; Lisa Chappell; Gary Sweet
- Country of origin: Australia
- No. of seasons: 8
- No. of episodes: 192

Production
- Executive producers: Mikael Borglund; Kris Noble; Posie Graeme-Evans
- Camera setup: Single-camera
- Running time: 44 minutes
- Production companies: Beyond Simpson Le Mesurier & Simpson Le Mesurier Films

Original release
- Network: Nine Network
- Release: 29 September 1998 – 14 December 2004

Stingers is an Australian police procedural crime drama television series. It premiered on 29 September 1998, and ran for eight seasons on the Nine Network before it was cancelled in late 2004 due to declining ratings, with its final episode airing on 14 December 2004. Inspired by true events, Stingers chronicled the cases of a deep undercover unit of the Victoria Police. The series also followed their personal lives, which sometimes became intertwined with their jobs. The original cast members include Peter Phelps, Kate Kendall, Anita Hegh, Ian Stenlake, Joe Petruzzi, and Jessica Napier. Phelps and Kendall were the only actors to remain with the show for its entire run (although Kendall is the only actor to appear in every episode, while Phelps appeared in 191 of the 192 episodes; absent from only one episode in season seven).

The show received average ratings during its debut season, but after some major changes, including intensive character development, the series became a success the following year. The series has also aired in 65 countries, including Canada, Ireland, New Zealand, the United Kingdom, and the United States.

== Overview ==
Inspired by true events, Stingers chronicled the cases of a deep undercover unit of the Victoria Police. The series also followed their personal lives, which sometimes became intertwined with their jobs. The original unit was composed of Senior Constable Peter Church (whose real name was Mike Fischer) played by Peter Phelps, Constable (later Detective Senior Constable) Angie Piper (Kate Kendall), Constable Kaye Kelso (whose real name was Emily Shaw) played by Jessica Napier, Constable Oscar Stone (whose real name was Cameron Pearce) played by Ian Stenlake, Detective Sergeant (later Detective Senior Sergeant) Ellen 'Mac' Mackenzie (Anita Hegh) and Detective Senior Sergeant Bernie Rocca (Joe Petruzzi), who led the unit. Kaye left the unit after being kidnapped and almost dying at the hands of a serial killer early in season one, while Rocca was shot and ultimately retired from police force in season two, with Mac becoming the new head of the unit soon after.

Constable Danni Mayo (Roxane Wilson) joined the unit in season three, while season five saw two casualties: Stone was killed while Mac ran away with a diamond robber. Detective Inspector Luke Harris (Gary Sweet) took over as head of the unit (now permutated into the newly-formed Special Investigations squad) until the end of the series, and Danni quit the force after being enraged by him. Probationary Constable (later Constable) Christina 'Chris' Dichiera (Jacinta Stapleton) joined the unit in season six. Her real name is Felicity 'Flick' Mathews, but this was not known to the force, as she had a juvenile criminal history under that name - having been a street kid during her teenage years prior to joining the police. Constable Leo Flynn (Daniel Frederiksen) joined in season seven, soon after initially been wrongly investigated by the unit.

Season eight saw the arrival of Homicide Detective Katherine Marks, who was revealed as Harris' daughter from his first marriage. The revelation also ended Harris and Angie's already shaky relationship, which had produced a son.

== Characters ==
=== Main ===
- Senior Constable Peter Church, played by Peter Phelps
- Detective Senior Constable (originally Constable) Angie Piper, played by Kate Kendall
- Constable Kaye Kelso, played by Jessica Napier (season 1)
- Detective Senior Sergeant Bernie Rocca, played by Joe Petruzzi (starring seasons 1–2; guest season 7)
- Constable Oscar Stone, played by Ian Stenlake (seasons 1–5)
- Detective Senior Sergeant (originally Detective Sergeant) Ellen 'Mac' Mackenzie, played by Anita Hegh (seasons 1–5)
- Constable Daniella 'Danni' Mayo, played by Roxane Wilson (seasons 3–6)
- Detective Inspector Luke Harris, played by Gary Sweet (seasons 6–8)
- Constable (originally Probationary Constable) Christina Dichiera, played by Jacinta Stapleton (seasons 6–8)
- Constable Leo Flynn, played by Daniel Frederiksen (seasons 7–8)

=== Recurring and supporting ===
- Detective Inspector (briefly demoted to Detective Senior Sergeant) Bill Hollister (Head of Homicide), played by Nicholas Bell (seasons 1–4)
- Detective Senior Sergeant Reg 'The Ferret' Masters (Head of Vice Squad/Head of Drugs Squad), played by Richard Morgan (seasons 2–8)
- Samantha Piper, Angie's younger sister, played by Asher Keddie (seasons 3–8)
- Detective Senior Sergeant Bryan Gray (Head of Armed Robbery/Senior Detective for Special Investigations), played by Jeremy Kewley (seasons 3–8)
- Detective Inspector Andrew Bligh (Internal Affairs), played by Russell Kiefel (seasons 3–7)
- Detective Stewart Campbell (Homicide Detective), played by William Houten (seasons 3–7)
- Detective Senior Sergeant Eric Chatterly (Fraud Squad Detective/Senior Homicide Detective, possibly Acting Head of Homicide), played by John Ridley (seasons 4–8)
- Detective Inspector Harry Love (Head of Homicide), played by Martin Jacobs (season 5)
- Detective Nick Jardine (Homicide Detective), played by Andy Rodoreda (season 5)
- Marty Engle (Informant/Angie's Fiancé), played by Jim Russell (season 5)
- Detective Inspector Frank Callahan (Head of Homicide), played by David Swann (seasons 5–6)
- Criminal Barrister Ingrid Burton, played by Rebecca Gibney (seasons 6–7)
- Sophie Novak (Receptionist for Special Investigations), played by Katrina Milosevic (seasons 7–8)
- Detective Katherine Marks (Homicide Detective), Harris' daughter, played by Gigi Edgley (season 8)
- Constable Megan Walsh, played by Lisa Chappell (season 8)

== Episodes ==
=== Season One (1998–1999) ===
No. overall	No. in season	Title	Original release date
1	1	"Ratcatcher"	29 September 1998
When a Homicide investigation into the disappearance of a teenage babysitter fails to reveal any useful evidence, Church and Angie go undercover to infiltrate a sinister criminal family.
2	2	"Hit Me"	6 October 1998
Someone is looking to hire a hitman, so Church goes undercover. His client is a woman who claims that her husband is trying to kill her. She wants him dead before he succeeds.
3	3	"The Initiation"	13 October 1998
A policeman has been shot. Undercover is called upon to infiltrate a suspected Romanian gang, but they don't deal with outsiders. Rocca must rely on an ex-undercover operative who could potentially jeopardize the job and the unit.
4	4	"Show the Dead Mouse: Part 1"	20 October 1998
Undercover is called in to a serial killer case. When Angie's cover is blown, Kaye becomes her replacement. Her first solo job is going well until all contact with her is lost and she vanishes.
5	5	"Show the Dead Mouse: Part 2"	27 October 1998
Following Kay's disappearance, the Unit goes into damage control, scrutinizing the surveillance footage and following up on the few leads they have – a process that provides an unexpected suspect. Final Appearance of Jessica Napier as Constable Kaye Kelso
6	6	"Backlash"	3 November 1998
Whilst undercover, Church is employed by a brutal mercenary, Cameron Fraser, to assist in the abduction of a young girl. After a botched attempt, Fraser successfully tails Church, putting the security of the unit at risk.
7	7	"Innocents Abroad"	10 November 1998
Following the drug-related death of a young clubber, the unit attempts to crack a large scale Ecstasy racket.
8	8	"Blind Love"	17 November 1998
Mackenzie is put undercover on the witness protection scheme to befriend a victim of attempted murder because of her connections with a leading politician who is suspected of corruption.
9	9	"Jelly Babies"	24 November 1998
While taking part in a buy/bust, Church and his dealer inadvertently become involved in a siege instigated by three teenage criminals.
10	10	"Nothing Personal"	22 February 1999
The Professional Integrity Unit investigations goes undercover over claims of corrupt handling. After evidence leads to Rocca's suspension, the unit wants to know what's going on.
11	11	"Ten Feet Tall and Bullet Proof"	1 March 1999
Church is forced to drop his longtime team informant, Benny. Benny is outraged, but as a last hurrah, he gives Church information about a planned armoured van robbery.
12	12	"Faking It"	8 March 1999
Working undercover, Church sets up a buy/bust which turns sour after Stone is bashed and falls into a coma. Emotions run high as Church is forced to remain undercover.
13	13	"Right on Target"	15 March 1999
After Stone is nearly shot during a meeting with a dealer, Mac is worried about Stone's well-being when an informant helps Stone penetrate a gun dealing ring.
14	14	"Without Fear or Favour"	6 April 1999
The Unit goes undercover to locate a charismatic prison escapee, Kane, who accuses the police of wanting him dead rather than recaptured.
15	15	"Lunatic Fringe: Part 1"	13 April 1999
Stone and Angie go undercover to infiltrate "Mother Earth," a radical environmental group suspected of stealing explosives. Church is put in prison to befriend Aaron Feilder, the psychopathic leader of the group.
16	16	"Lunatic Fringe: Part 2"	20 April 1999
Church encounters Stone as part of the environmental extremist group. Stone wants to report to the unit but Church, driven by his own agenda, insists that any contact would jeopardise the sting.
17	17	"Talker"	27 April 1999
Someone is killing prostitutes and when another woman is found murdered, Mackenzie and Angie go undercover at a brothel.
18	18	"Into the Cold"	4 May 1999
When Church goes undercover to investigate a murder, he inadvertently ingratiates himself with the Rossis, a criminal family currently the target of an independent inquiry. Church is ordered to remain undercover.
19	19	"Lone Hand"	11 May 1999
With the help of the unit, Church manages to impress Dino Rossi and weaken the position of his right-hand man, who is resentful of Church being accepted into the ranks.
20	20	"Proving Ground"	18 May 1999
Mackenzie and Angie face an Internal Affairs investigation when an informant commits suicide.
21	21	"Cast Off"	25 May 1999
While the Unit learns of Church's relationship with Christina, Church is forced to come to terms with Christina's involvement with the family business and refuses to testify against Dino.
22	22	"Dead Man's Throw"	1 June 1999
Information comes to light that someone is trying to sell Dino details about Church. With his identity revealed, it is a deadly race against time for Church to save his relationship and his life.

=== Season Two (1999) ===
No. overall	No. in season	Title	Original release date
23	1	"Salsa: Part 1"	8 June 1999
Stone and Angie go undercover to investigate the murder of a young Asian woman involved in the X-rated movie business. MacKenzie receives a compromising photograph relating to her former relationship with Church.
24	2	"Salsa: Part 2"	15 June 1999
The compromising photograph of MacKenzie and Church threatens the security of the entire unit. Church pursues the source of the photos while Angie and Stone push for more information on the Porn Star murderer.
25	3	"Set for Life"	22 June 1999
Church works undercover as a safecracker to find out the target of the robbery, discovering that the gang have a one-off, get-rich-quick scheme.
26	4	"The Big Picture"	29 June 1999
Rocca finds himself in unfamiliar territory when he goes undercover with Church on a case involving gold smuggling and political intrigue.
27	5	"Rat Trap"	6 July 1999
The Unit pull off a successful cocaine bust, leaving drug lord, Justin Forbes, wanting revenge. Acting on information supplied by Forbes' lover, Heather, Stone is sent undercover to infiltrate the drug lord's operation.
28	6	"Finders Keepers"	27 July 1999
MacKenzie goes undercover in a woman's prison. Her target is Nancy, a young woman convicted of murdering her husband, who embezzled millions of dollars in an investment scam. The Unit's aim is to recover the money.
29	7	"Playing with the Celibate Dead"	29 July 1999
Stone and MacKenzie infiltrate a gang planning to rob and murder a coin dealer. When they lose contact with the Unit, Rocca must second guess their movements.
30	8	"White Lies"	3 August 1999
Church is due to give evidence in court against major crime figure, Dino Rossi, but the Unit discovers someone wants Church silenced before he can testify.
31	9	"Mr. Right"	10 August 1999
MacKenzie works closely with Maddern, a psychological profiler to identify a killer who uses the internet to select his victims. With the Unit in full-scale back up, Mac is put undercover as bait.
32	10	"The Favour"	17 August 1999
Working undercover as an ex-army officer, that now supplies illegal explosives, Stone encounters his first girlfriend, Kelly, entangled in a contrabrand arms export scam.
33	11	"Judas Kiss"	31 August 1999
While investigating large scale thefts on the docks, Church accidentally shoots an old mate, Tony. While Church is suspended, the Unit continues to uncover the extent of the shipping robberies.
34	12	"Counting the Beat"	7 September 1999
Church and Angie go undercover to investigate suspected drug importation in the music industry. Church works on the record company manager, while Angie investigates charismatic rock star, Jimi Mercer.
35	13	"Just Acting"	14 September 1999
Stone leads a sting on a well known crime family that doesn't quite go to plan as the eldest son, Billy, escapes. Stone and Angie lay low at Stone's family farm, but Billy tracks them down.
36	14	"Unnatural Justice"	21 September 1999
When the daughter of a Family Court judge is abducted, Church teams up with Rory, a young Undercover recruit, and together they investigate a group lobbying against the judge.
37	15	"Dance with the Dragon"	28 September 1999
While investigating a heroin racket, Church encounters his nephew, Matt, who has fallen victim to the needle. Church spends time with Matt, experiencing the emotional, rather than criminal, side of heroin addiction.
38	16	"The Long Haul"	5 October 1999
Undercover with Angie and Stone, Church investigates a series of strategic truck-hijackings which have turned to murder.
39	17	"Swarm"	12 October 1999
When the husband of a leading Aboriginal activist is car-bombed, Stone and Angie go undercover to investigate SWARM, a radical right-wing group suspected of involvement.
40	18	"Men in the Dark"	19 October 1999
When A.J., one of MacKenzie's informants, finds out that the adoption of his young Vietnamese daughter wasn't strictly legal, Church and MacKenzie uncover a ring of child smugglers.
41	19	"Full Term"	26 October 1999
By using Stone's informant, Rocca plans a dangerous drug operation to land a well known drug heavy. The drug operation is put at risk when Stone's informant goes into labour and Church is left holding the baby.
42	20	"House Rules"	2 November 1999
Church and Mac go undercover to infiltrate a group of high-roller gamblers who conduct illegal gaming sessions. The sting takes a bizarre turn when the gaming session is raided, not by the police, but by robbers.
43	21	"Signal One"	9 November 1999
When Rocca is shot outside his home, Church becomes obsessed with finding the gunman. Mac assumes she will fill in for Rocca so there is friction aplenty as a new boss joins the ranks.
44	22	"The Dingo (Listed as Dingo on the DVD)"	16 November 1999
Church meets a new informant, Terry Hanks, who repeatedly delivers big time drug dealers, but when Terry offers to land them 'The Dingo', the biggest and baddest dealer of all, Mac and Church have their doubts.

=== Season Three (2000) ===
No. overall	No. in season	Title	Original release date
45	1	"Brilliant Lies"	14 June 2000
A sassy new operative arrives at the Unit as the group go undercover to entrap a gang of teenage thieves. However, a mistake leads to as kidknapping which places everyone in jeopardy.
46	2	"Forced Perspective"	21 June 2000
Church goes undercover into the world of stolen art. When he discovers that the target is abusing his son, Church's repressed memories. of his abusive father are triggered and he must grapple with conflicting emotions.
47	3	"Which Bank?"	28 June 2000
A well planned sting goes horribly wrong when Church infiltrates a criminal gang who are intent on robbing a very large bank.
48	4	"Twisted Sister"	1 August 2000
Angie's assignment is jeopardised with the unexpected arrival of her sister. Mac is faced with a crisis when she discovers that Danni is involved with a suspect.
49	5	"Unplaced Favourite"	8 August 2000
Danni's future with the unit is on the line when her ex-boyfriend becomes the prime suspect in a horse-doping scam.
50	6	"No Way Out"	15 August 2000
Hollister asks Mac for help to capture master bank robber, Marty Stockwell. Hollister wants revenge after Stockwell fatally shot one of his men. Church and Danni go undercover to bring Stockwell to justice.
51	7	"Necessary Force"	22 August 2000
In court, things go horribly wrong when the Magistrate dismisses the charges against Tony Howarth for shooting Bernie Rocca. Church comes under fire from Internal Affairs after he is accused of using excessive force to obtain a confession.
52	8	"No Pain, No Gain"	29 August 2000
Church becomes involved in a young boy's life after he catches him trying to steal his car. Meanwhile, Angie goes undercover to expose a dentist accused of malpractice.
53	9	"HeartLine"	5 September 2000
Three backpackers are murdered. Stone is sent in to investigate the suspect, Evelyn Leigh but he lets his emotions cloud hs judgement – a mistake that could cost him his life.
54	10	"Mob Rules"	12 September 2000
Mac and Church must infiltrate a neighbourhood residents group who are protesting the acquittal and return to the neighbourhood of a local teacher recently charged with the murder of a young student.
55	11	"A Marriage to Die For"	12 September 2000
When Church conducts a sting on a bikie gang, a simple gun deal becomes complicated after Church is hired to do a hit.
56	12	"In Too Deep"	19 September 2000
The undercover Unit face a psychological challenge when an operative loses his identity during a long-term assignment.
57	13	"The Last Hit"	19 September 2000
Church strikes up an unlikely friendship with a hitman after preventing his attempted suicide. He is drawn into the middle of a heated triangle with no simple solution.
58	14	"Fine Details"	26 September 2000
Danni learns the meaning of betrayal when she is forced to use an innocent to solve a murder.
59	15	"Truly, Madly, Deeply"	3 October 2000
MacKenzie faces a dilemma when Detective Inspector Bill Hollister is revealed as a regular client at an illegal brothel.
60	16	"The Good Life"	17 October 2000
Danni and the rest of the team are called in when a well-known career criminal turns Crown witness under unusual circumstances.
61	17	"Second Chance"	24 October 2000
MacKenzie's past comes back to haunt her when her adopted brother is released from prison.
62	18	"Every Move You Make"	31 October 2000
While working to exposed and armed robbery ring, Angie is stalked by an obsessed admirer. The stalker not only jeopardises Angie's sting, but threatens the security of the entire unit.
63	19	"A Matter of Trust"	7 November 2000
Church must put his career on the line when an old Academy buddy is implicated in a homicide.
64	20	"Spare Parts"	14 November 2000
A personal favour from Church becomes a case for Undercover when an illegal organ-trading scam is exposed.
65	21	"Organised Crime"	21 November 2000
The Undercover Unit are assigned to investigate a five-year-old unsolved bank robbery with tragic consequences.
66	22	"Something Old, Something New"	21 November 2000
MacKenzie and Angie face an internal Affairs investigation when an informant commits suicide.

=== Season Four (2001) ===
No. overall	No. in season	Title	Original release date
67	1	"Snakehead"	14 August 2001
The Undercover Unit is called in to investigate when eleven illegal immigrants are found dead inside a shipping container.
68	2	"Rich Man's World"	21 August 2001
Church uses an informant to infiltrate a drug syndicate, with tragic consequences.
69	3	"Beyond Redemption"	28 August 2001
Angie goes undercover at a halfway house to obtain evidence against a psychological killer.
70	4	"Tell Me You Love Me"	11 September 2001
Church and MacKenzie pose as a married couple experiencing relationship difficulties as they investigate a murder.
71	5	"Fool to Want You"	18 September 2001
Church becomes the prime suspect in a murder investigation when he moonlights as a private investigator.
72	6	"Family Values"	25 September 2001
Church goes undercover in a bikie gang to expose a major amphetamine ring, with unexpected and tragic consequences.
73	7	"Whatever It Takes"	2 October 2001
The future of the Undercover Unit looks uncertain when Stone is investigated for the shooting death of biker Chicken Lake.
74	8	"Into the Darkness"	10 October 2001
In the aftermath of Bill Hollister's murder, MacKenzie grieves while Church tries to bring the killer to justice.
75	9	"Foster Cops"	17 October 2001
Church and Danni pose as foster parents in an unusual operation to capture Australia's Most Wanted Armed Robber.
76	10	"The Whisper Room"	23 October 2001
The Undercover Unit investigates a group of paedophiles who use an internet chat-room to procure their victims.
77	11	"Feud"	24 October 2001
The Undercover investigate an extortion attempt against a pharmaceutical company and find themselves at the centre of a long-term feud.
78	12	"One of Us"	30 October 2001
Stone is recruited by an Assistant Commissioner to assassinate the Bomb-maker responsible for Bill Hollister's death.
79	13	"Dog Eat Dog (Episode 80 on DVD)"	31 October 2001
The Undercover Unit stage an intensive investigation to nail the ex-police officer believed responsible for Bill Hollister's murder.
80	14	"Slice (Episode 79 on DVD)"	6 November 2001
Danni's cover is blown and her career is threatened when an escaped criminal seeks his revenge.
81	15	"Love Hurts"	7 November 2001
A case of mistaken identity results in Stone being recruited to assist with a major armed robbery.
82	16	"Psychotic Episode"	20 November 2001
Strange guns, UFOs, and piggerists with glass eyes – it's all in a day's work for Church, when his only source of information for a possible murder case is a paranoid schizophrenic.
83	17	"Closure"	21 November 2001
MacKenzie investigates a Private Detective who specialises in adoption cases, with the secret hope of locating her birth mother.
84	18	"True Colours"	21 November 2001
MacKenzie makes contact with her natural mother and both women become embroiled in an Undercover operation to nail a mastermind armed robber.
85	19	"Too Many Crooks"	27 November 2001
The Unit works with an undercover operative from Queensland to defeat a gang of amphetamine dealers responsible for a kidnapping.
86	20	"Just Another Day"	27 November 2001
Stone is caught in a siege situation at a hospital when an armed robbery goes horribly wrong.
87	21	"Reunion"	28 November 2001
Church's worlds collide when he has to attend his twenty year high-school reunion as part of a drug sting.
88	22	"Do the Right Thing"	28 November 2001
As Church, Danni, Stone and Angie focus on a drug sting, MacKenzie is distracted by an invitation to apply for Head of Homicide – which would mean leaving the Undercover Unit.

=== Season Five (2002) ===
No. overall	No. in season	Title	Original release date
89	1	"Thin Ice"	5 February 2002
MacKenzie becomes the victim of a grifter on the eve of her interview for Head of Homicide, while Church's career is threatened when a journalist attempts to expose him.
90	2	"An Anonymous Guy"	12 February 2002
Angie has to develop a romantic relationship with a murder suspect and then coerce him into becoming an informant.
91	3	"Cash on Delivery"	19 February 2002
Danni's determination to go it alone with her pregnancy clouds her professional judgement when she stumbles across an illegal adoption racket.
92	4	"What's Love Got to Do with It?"	27 February 2002
MacKenzie discovers the grifter who drugged her is linked to a senior colleague – someone who had good reason to want her out of the running for Head of Homicide.
93	5	"A Little Crush"	5 March 2002
Stone cultivates a live-wire young prostitute named Brittany to obtain information on a dangerous drug criminal.
94	6	"No Promises"	12 March 2002
When Church is sent under cover to share a cell with a convicted murder, Danni must face the toughest decision of her life alone.
95	7	"Mule Train"	19 March 2002
Angie is forced to bend the rules as she attempts to prevent her sister Sam from being arrested on drug importation charges.
96	8	"White Ants"	26 March 2002
Danni has to protect former undercover cop Gary Edgerton and help prepare him for court case where he is the reluctant key witness.
97	9	"In the Gun"	2 April 2002
Stone investigates a woman who may be organising a hit on her husband, while MacKenzie is dealing with hit men of a different kind.
98	10	"In Plain View"	9 April 2002
Angie and the rest of the Undercover Unit rally around MacKenzie, risking their jobs in order to prove her innocence.
99	11	"Fatal Flaw"	16 April 2002
With Harry Love in a position to make his final move against MacKenzie, she and the other Undercover have to take desperate action.
100	12	"Trust"	23 April 2002
Angie goes undercover to bust an armed robbery ring but her romance with informant Marty Engle places them both in dangerous territory.
101	13	"Big Fish"	30 April 2002
Stone and Church go undercover to investigate a pair of teenage drug manufacturers, with unexpectedly tragic consequences.
102	14	"Demilitarized Zone"	7 May 2002
Sonte is abducted when Undercover fails to bust an international arms dealing ring that is run by lethal ex SAS officers.
103	15	"Blow Off"	14 May 2002
When a failed frug bust leaves Undercover with a dead dealer and a high class prostitute holding a couple of bags of cocaine, the Unit undertakes an operation inside a busy brothel.
104	16	"Inside Man"	21 May 2002
When an undercover operation causes the death of a young woman, Church and Angie are faced with the dilemma of saving one dangerous criminal from another.
105	17	"Mind Games"	28 May 2002
The Unit's attempt to trap a serial killer leaves MacKenzie fighting for her and her best friend's life.
106	18	"Disgraceful Conduct"	4 June 2002
Stone is set to expose a high powered businessman trading cars for heroin when he discovers a young prostitute he has cared for his in anger as a result of his actions.
107	19	"Smoke and Mirrors"	2 July 2002
Church becomes convinced he is being stalked by a man who holds him responsible for the murder of his girlfriend.
108	20	"Too Much Information"	9 July 2002
When the Unit try to nab a standover man for murder, Angie's relationship with an informant causes a confrontation within the ranks.
109	21	"Pale Horse"	16 July 2002
The unit seems on shaky ground when Homicide attempt to charge Church with murder, but are devastated when Stone goes beyond the call of duty to save Church.
110	22	"A Girl's Best Friend"	23 July 2002
MacKenzie is faced with a choice between her personal happiness and her successful career when she becomes involved with a charismatic art thief.

=== Season Six (2002) ===
No. overall	No. in season	Title	Original release date
111	1	"Collateral Damage"	13 August 2002
Oscar Stone's Killer is brought to trial in a situation of high security. The accused is represented by a high profile criminal barrister, Ingrid Burton.
112	2	"The Last Dance"	20 August 2002
When Church goes undercover as an armed robber, he is busted by a young cop. Harris is so impressed that he arranges for her to join Undercover for a trial period.
113	3	"Teamwork"	3 September 2002
Church's undercover assignment results in the kidnapping of a drug dealer's son. Meanwhile, Chris finds herself on what appears to be a routine surveillance job at a video store.
114	4	"Looking After Number One"	10 September 2002
An undercover attempt to sting a drug distributor results in tragedy, with accusations made against an undercover operative.
115	5	"Old Scores"	24 September 2002
Harris sends Chris undercover to infiltrate a violent gang of brothers despite Church's reservations about her inexperience.
116	6	"Separation Anxiety"	1 October 2002
A middle-aged woman, Helen, brings a cardboard box into police headquarters claiming it contains a bomb.
117	7	"Slow Hand, Easy Touch"	8 October 2002
Church's hapless pursuit of the coke happy Vidarl crew takes a turn for the worse when most of them turn up dead – victims of a bloody armed robbery.
118	8	"Scratch Me Lucky"	15 October 2002
Church goes undercover on a building site to investigate union corruption and the disappearance of activist Craig Shore.
119	9	"Payback"	22 October 2002
Church goes undercover on the construction site where Ingrid Burton's client, Steer, was murdered. Church is convinced that Harris is corrupt and goes to extreme lengths to prove it.
120	10	"The Whole Truth"	29 October 2002
Church and Angie continue piecing together links between Conrad, suspected drug kingpin Stig Enquist and known union basher Rick Tyson. Harris suspects Church of corruption.
121	11	"Breakdown"	5 November 2002
Harris is clearly losing it and is convinced that his officers are out to get him. In his paranoid state, he decides it's time to do something about Church...kill him.
122	12	"Partners in Crime"	12 November 2002
The cat is well and truly set among the pigeons when Church and Harris are forced to work together determined to catch two small-time dealers.
123	13	"Revenge of the Turtles"	19 November 2002
Church and Harris find themselves under extreme pressure to sealer their names after the Police Integrity Unit are tipped off about the duo's possible involvement in a drug trade.
124	14	"Uriel's Sword"	26 November 2002
When drug boss Stig Enquist survives an attempt on his life, Church convinces him that the assailant was Stone's killer, Conrad.

=== Season Seven (2003–2004) ===
No. overall	No. in season	Title	Original release date
125	1	"Lies and Secrets"	25 March 2003
Church's determination to find Ingrid, missing for seven days, brings him into conflict with his colleagues.
126	2	"Pentimento"	1 April 2003
An undercover operation investigating stolen art reveals black market dealings.
127	3	"Cul-De-Sac"	8 April 2003
Harris' attempts to teach a mate a lesson in crime and punishment backfire with disastrous consequences.
128	4	"Your Cheating Heart"	15 April 2003
When Angie is hired as a nurse by two brothers, she's forced to go on a job without back-up.
129	5	"Don't Look Back"	22 April 2003
Chris' future is jeopardised when she's forced to shoot a former squat mate.
130	6	"Snakes in the Grass"	29 April 2003
The team lose a colleague when a hostage situation erupts at Police Headquarters.
131	7	"Aftershocks"	6 May 2003
While investigating the murder of a friend, Church loses Angie's heart to his boss, Luk Harris.
132	8	"Priapus' Playground"	13 May 2003
Church and Angie penetrate the liberated world of swinging couples and find that love really is a drug.
133	9	"The Eighth Day"	20 May 2003
Church fakes the murder of a security guard to infiltrate a Jewish crime family.
134	10	"Sex & Drugs & Deep House"	27 May 2003
Chris' relationship with a lesbian clubber turns to tragedy when her lover is suspected of murder.
135	11	"New Blood"	3 June 2003
The unit discover a renegade young detective who has all the qualities to become the new undercover recruit.
136	12	"Cold War"	10 June 2003
Rookie Leo Flynn bites off more than he can chew while investigating a drug war between two rival ice-cream vendors.: Only episode in the series not to feature Peter Phelps as Peter Church.
137	13	"Acts of Love"	17 June 2003
Harris takes an impulsive trip to Singapore in an attempt to win Angie's heart and protect her from Internal Affairs.
138	14	"Heartbeat"	24 June 2003
A young deaf girl arrives at PHQ declaring she's Church's daughter. When Harris uses her to solve a crime, all hell breaks loose.
139	15	"Sons & Lovers"	1 July 2003
The undercover unit simultaneously pursues a European war criminal and her drug dealing son.
140	16	"It Started with a Kiss"	8 July 2003
A sexual indiscretion of Harris' comes back to haunt him when Church is hired to kill him.
141	17	"Wild Card"	15 July 2003
Church makes a dangerous call when faced with a conflict of loyalty between Harris and his old box, Bernie Rocca.
142	18	"Practice of Deceit"	22 July 2003
Flynn endangers his life and that of his pregnant sister on a deadly assignment with two cop killers.
143	19	"Killing Heidi"	29 July 2003
Chris risks her life to sting a sadistic chef for murder.
144	20	"Sleeping with the Enemy"	5 August 2003
Church is hired at a furniture removal company suspected of a drug courier business.
145	21	"A Horse Is a Horse"	12 August 2003
Masters goes undercover in order to bust a racehorse stealing, coke dealing porn king.
146	22	"Conversations with the Dead"	19 August 2003
Church goes undercover as a spiritual medium to hoodwink an internal gun runner.
147	23	"Free Radical"	26 August 2003
Sophie takes Church to lunch with two of the state's biggest criminals which could mean Church's last meal.
148	24	"Daddy's Little Diamond"	2 September 2003
While playing nanny to the daughter of a suspected hitman, Chris is horrified by the child's revelation.
149	25	"Time Out"	9 September 2003
Leo finds himself in deep trouble with a group of armed robbers while Harris is having his own problems.
150	26	"Perfect Match"	16 September 2003
Harris is blackmailed by an adversary from his past who threatens to reveal his psychiatric disorder. Meanwhile, Angie receives a proposal of marriage.
151	27	"Boosted"	23 September 2003
Harris' blackmailer has more tricks up his sleeve which put Angie's life on the line.
152	28	"One Perfect Day"	30 September 2003
Bi-polar, confused, gun-toting, groom Luke is a bundle of nerves – but not over the big day.
153	29	"Troppo Fest"	7 October 2003
The showdown between Harris and his blackmailer reaches a dramatic climax and Angie may pay the price.
154	30	"Train Wreck"	14 October 2003
Church unwillingly agrees to play cupid for an informant and his estranged wife, until she is murdered.
155	31	"The Thin Blue Line"	21 October 2003
Flynn finds himself in a treacherous love triangle when he is seduced by a colleague.
156	32	"Love's Labours Lost"	28 October 2003
The undercover squad are working on a drug sting in the rave scene when they discover that the drug dealer's 12-year-old daughter is the girlfriend of Detective Bryan Gray's teenage son Frank. When Bryan finds out, his response is typically insensitive and it jeopardizes the operation. But it leads to a watershed in Bryan's strained relationship with his son and forces Luke Harris to re-appraise Bryan Gray. Meanwhile Luke is pressuring Angie to give their very brief marriage one more go. He wines and dines his estranged wife, but it seems she can't be won over.
157	33	"Fashion Victim"	28 October 2003
Things quickly become more complicated in Angie and Luke's marriage.
158	34	"Total Recall"	9 March 2004
Eight months have passed since Chris was shot by an unseen gunman, but the shooter's identity is still to be found.
159	35	"The Wrong Man"	16 March 2004
Church goes undercover as a hitman in a desperate attempt to save a kidnapped girl.
160	36	"The Weakest Link"	23 March 2004
Church's efforts to nail a high profile people smuggler are thrown into chaos by a rogue Homicide detective.
161	37	"Twilight"	30 March 2004
Flynn wakes up in a hazy, drug-induced state next to the dead body of a prostitute.
162	38	"The Object of My Affection"	6 April 2004
A drug dealer offers to act as an informant in his father's drug organisation. However, he has a condition: Chris must go on a date with him.
163	39	"From Russia with Love"	13 April 2004
Despite agreeing to help her, Church is not convinced that he can trust the daughter of one of his informants.
164	40	"Cops and Robbers"	20 April 2004
Working undercover, a masked Leo is forced to steal the proceeds of an illegal poker game – and the players happen to be none other than Peter Church and Bryan Gray.

=== Season Eight (2004) ===
No. overall	No. in season	Title	Original release date
165	1	"Hammer Horror"	27 April 2004
Flynn's old flame guides him deep into the world of body art, heroin and murder.
166	2	"A Square Inside the Circle"	25 May 2004
Chris suffers body blows when she is forced to fight with her fists to nail a big time gangster.
167	3	"Family Ties (listed as "Husbands and Wives" on the DVD)"	1 June 2004
Harris and Angie's son, Joshua, is abducted in a tragic case of mistaken identity.
168	4	"The River of No Return"	8 June 2004
Angie goes undercover to hunt down a serial killer who is preying on a popular tourist hotel.
169	5	"Brave New World"	15 June 2004
Church risks radiation exposure in a desperate attempt to avert the detonation of a dirty bomb.
170	6	"No Man's Land (Listed as "Mid Level Violence" on the DVD)"	22 June 2004
A stalled murder investigation forces Flynn to go undercover in a Middle Eastern consulate.
171	7	"One More Chance"	29 June 2004
A domestic violence victim takes the law into her own hands.
172	8	"Break and Enter"	6 July 2004
A hitman targets Chris when she investigates the sex murders of two teenage boys.
173	9	"House of Mirrors"	13 July 2004
Luke Harris uses his bi-polar disorder as a cover to try and find a killer in a psychiatric clinic.
174	10	"Roman Charity"	20 July 2004
Apparently addicted to opium, Harris strikes a deal with a major drug dealer.
175	11	"Starlight Hotel"	27 July 2004
A revelation in a murder investigation suggests that the homeless are being exploited for snuff movies.
176	12	"The Complete Package"	3 August 2004
Harris goes undercover as a translator for a Malaysian drug cartel.
177	13	"The Contract"	10 August 2004
Church and Gray attempt to sting an elusive crook but they might have targeted the wrong man.
178	14	"Vanished"	17 August 2004
Betrayed by an old love, Church faces execution at the hand of a major drug dealer.
179	15	"Mea Culpa"	23 August 2004
Angie Piper pursues a personal journey of revenge for the shocking death of her sister.
180	16	"Past Lives"	30 August 2004
When a gay friend of Chris' commits suicide, Chris suspects he was murdered as pard of a paedophilia cover up.
181	17	"I Am the Walrus"	7 September 2004
Harris' complex relationship with his daughter threatens to implode.
182	18	"Dream Machine"	14 September 2004
Church hunts down a politically connected businessman importing cocaine.
183	19	"The Good Oil"	21 September 2004
Harris' opium addiction nearly costs him his life when he is exposed during an investigation.
184	20	"Dirty Little Secrets"	28 September 2004
Angie and Harris discover the shocking truth about their colleague, Meagan Walsh.
185	21	"Being Josh Brisbane"	3 October 2004
Undercover as a hitman, Church is injured and suffers amnesia.
186	22	"End Game"	19 October 2004
Accused of corruption and under investigation by IA, Church may have reached his use-by-date.
187	23	"Random Harvest"	26 October 2004
Flynn and Church are undercover in the rival gangs when the city erupts into violence.
188	24	"Hunting Ground"	2 November 2004
Angie goes undercover to bust a contract killer by posing as his long lost daughter.
189	25	"Year of the Snake"	9 November 2004
The murder of an illegal immigrant leads undercover to a brothel trading sex slaves.
190	26	"Head On"	30 November 2004
Chris is involved in a car smash which leaves a young boy permanently disabled.
191	27	"The Heart Is a Lonely Hunter"	7 December 2004
Harris' obsession with Angie's new partner spirals out of control when one of the Undercover unit falls victim to a serial killer.
192	28	"After the Fact"	14 December 2004
Angie frantically tries to clear her lover's name while Harris works equally hard to convict him as the serial killer.

== Series history and production ==
On Sunday 16 July 2006 at 2 p.m., Executive producer John Wild and script producer Marcia Gardner sat down with an audience at ACMI in Federation Square in Melbourne to "explore the narrative arc and character development from the first episodes to the final series." The event took place in the Screen Pit and was free to the public. Also in attendance was cast member Jeremy Kewley who posted the following rundown of the discussion for the Stingers forum:

Stingers came about in a very fast manner. John Wild had to get the show from a concept 'jotted down on paper' into a television series in just 11 weeks and in an 8.30pm time slot!

It first began airing up towards the end of the year, on Monday nights. It was up against another new show on Channel Seven, Ally McBeal, and Stingers beat McBeal regularly for its first 11 weeks before it went on its Christmas ratings break. When both shows returned after the ratings break, McBeal began to win in the ratings quite comfortably, worrying Nine executives.

At this time Channel Nine and the producers had to work out how to win ratings back, and found that the reason why so many people preferred Ally McBeal over Stingers was because Stingers had a very rough, edgy and realistic feel to it, and that this did not appeal to women of all ages, who preferred the lightness of McBeal. So Stingers was moved to Tuesday night. This helped a bit, but not enough. Channel Nine were thinking about canceling the show, but Nine owner Kerry Packer liked the show and suggested that they keep it on the air. Nine did, but moved it an hour later to 9.30pm Tuesdays, and Stingers started to find its audience (although this was still not a big one). It stayed at this timeslot until the end of 7th season which seemed to be predominately male middle class white collar workers between the ages of 30–55.

By the middle of the second season, ratings were still not spectacular enough and Channel Nine commissioned research which showed that women were not particularly interested in Stingers. As women make up 50% of the audience the producers were told to make the first major change to Stingers: make it more female-friendly. This led to the departure of Joe Petruzzi, making Anita Hegh's character the boss of the Unit. This also led to another female character being introduced, undercover operative Danni Mayo, portrayed by Roxane Wilson. This led to the show becoming more 'lighter' to appeal to the female audiences. Soon after, humour was added to the show, in the form of Jeremy Kewley's character, Bryan Gray. These changes worked well and Stingers steamed through Seasons 3, 4 and 5, but then Anita Hegh and Ian Stenlake decided to leave the show, causing another drastic change in the series.

Channel Nine, on a nationwide cost-cutting drive, hinted at dropping the show because Stingers' was considered too expensive; its budget had crept up from its original $440,000-per-episode cost, to around $480,000. They dropped a bombshell on the producers: shave around $130,000 every week from the budget or the show would have to cease production. A huge ask, but everyone at Stingers was keen to keep going as everyone felt there were still life in the show and plenty of stories to tell.

By the start of the next season the budget was chopped down to $350,000 per episode. Shooting changed from six days per episode to five, stock changed from 16 mm film to SP Betacam Videotape, the crew became smaller, and writers were given less time to write each episode. The location changed from the "Crimplex" (warehouse/studio/offices by the Yarra River) to the studios of Channel Nine in Richmond. Channel Nine spent money on a big new set (plus a new "hospital ward" set and a new "pub/bar" set) and justified the cost by making sure that most of the action on the show now took place inside the studio on the new sets, with a lot less time spent on locations, with less money spent on car chases, stunts and special effects.

Channel Nine also wanted more "star power" in the show, so Gary Sweet and Jacinta Stapleton were brought in as Luke Harris and Christina Dichiera respectively (while Roxane Wilson decided to leave), and Rebecca Gibney – now out of a job without Halifax f.p. – was cast for the first few episodes of the new season. Most of these major changes worked quite well, and most viewers at home would not have been too aware of the changes to the visual quality of the show (such as using tape instead of film).

But, as Executive Producer John Wild humorously pointed out, "the ratings didn't change one point!" Channel Nine commissioned more surveys that told them the show needed to appeal to younger viewers. So another new character, Leo Flynn, was added, played by Daniel Frederiksen, and, John Wild said, "and the ratings still didn't change one point!" Channel Nine insisted that still more star power was needed to lift the ratings, so Lisa Chappell (Logie winning McLeod's Daughters star) joined the cast. After still no improvement to the ratings, more star power was further added in guest roles with Bill Hunter, Gigi Edgley, Steve Bisley, Tottie Goldsmith. No improvement still.

Stingers was then "rested" for a couple of weeks and replaced by repeats of CSI: Crime Scene Investigation, and these repeats rated better than first-run episodes of Stingers (screening a repeat episode of CSI probably costs the network about $25,000 as opposed to a first-run episode of Stingers at $350,000).

It became clear what Nine would do: move Stingers to 10.30pm on a permanent basis and put higher-rating repeats of CSI on at 9.30 p.m. Channel Nine in Adelaide did not like this move and moved Stingers to 9:30 Monday nights, however this only lasted for five weeks before it was moved back to 10:30 on a Tuesday night; such a move to a later timeslot caused Stingers’ ratings to drop considerably, giving Nine reason to finally end the show. Stingers’ curse seemed to be that it always rated well, but it never rated spectacularly.

== Home media ==
- 2006–2009: Beyond Home Entertainment released Seasons 1–8 as individual Season DVDs.
- 2013: Beyond Home Entertainment released Stingers: The Complete Collection Boxset.
- 2016: Beyond Home Entertainment released Stingers: Season 1 & 2 Collectors set.
- 2020: In August, 9now began streaming the complete series. However, the series was later removed from 9now in 2022
- 2024: In August, 7plus began streaming the complete series, initially with the first six seasons available from early August, before adding the remaining two seasons of the series two weeks later.

Title	Format	Ep #	Discs	Region 4 (Australia)	Special Features	Distributor
Season One	DVD	22	6	4 September 2006	None	Beyond Home Entertainment
Season Two	DVD	22	6	14 March 2007	None	Beyond Home Entertainment
Season Three	DVD	22	6	4 June 2007	None	Beyond Home Entertainment
Season Four	DVD	22	6	7 December 2007	None	Beyond Home Entertainment
Season Five	DVD	22	6	11 June 2008	None	Beyond Home Entertainment
Season Six	DVD	14	4	6 January 2009	None	Beyond Home Entertainment
Season Seven	DVD	40	10	10 June 2009	None	Beyond Home Entertainment
Season Eight	DVD	28	7	4 August 2009	None	Beyond Home Entertainment
Stingers The Complete Series	DVD	192	51	1 May 2013	None	Beyond Home Entertainment
Stingers Season 1 & 2 Collectors set	DVD	44	13	20 April 2016	None	Beyond Home Entertainment
Stingers (Season 01-04)	DVD	88	24	21 April 2021	None	Madman Entertainment & Via Vision Entertainment
Stingers (Season 05-08)	DVD	104	27	18 August 2021	None	Madman Entertainment & Via Vision Entertainment
Stingers The Complete Collection	DVD	192	51	06 November 2024	None	Via Vision Entertainment

== Reception ==
=== Series ratings ===
Season	Episodes	Originally aired		Viewers (in millions)	Rating	Drama Rank
Season	Episodes	Season premiere	Season finale	Viewers (in millions)	Rating	Drama Rank
1	22	29 September 1998	1 June 1999	—N/a	11.2	#5
2	22	8 June 1999	16 November 1999	—N/a	8.4	#6
3	22	12 June 2000	21 November 2000	—N/a	8.3	#7
4	22	14 August 2001	28 November 2001	—N/a		
5	22	5 February 2002	23 July 2002	1.003	7.6	#9
6	14	13 August 2002	26 November 2002	1.003	7.6	#9
7	40	25 March 2003	20 April 2004	1.024	7.6	#8
8	28	27 April 2004	14 December 2004	0.646	4.7	#6

=== Awards and nominations ===
==== Awards ====
Australian Film Institute Television Awards:

- Best Television Drama Series (2004)
- Best Performance by an Actor in a Guest Role in a Television Drama Series – Chris Haywood for the episode "Men in the Dark" (2000)

Logie Awards:

- Most Popular Actor – Peter Phelps (2002)

==== Nominations ====
Australian Film Institute Television Awards:

- Best Actress in a Supporting or Guest Role in a Television Drama or Comedy – Jacinta Stapleton (2004)
- Best Direction in Television – Grant Brown (2004)
- Best Screenplay in Television – Matt Ford (2004)
- Best Television Drama Series (2003)
- Best Actor in a Guest Role in a Television Drama Series – Travis McMahon for the episode "Rich Man's World" (2001)
- Best Performance by an Actress in a Guest Role in a Television Drama Series – Rhondda Findleton for the episode "Fool To Want You" (2001)
- Best Performance by an Actor in a Guest Role in a Television Drama Series – Aaron Blabey for the episode "Second Chance" (2000)
- Best Performance by an Actor in a Guest Role in a Television Drama Series – Daniel Daperis for the episode "Forced Perspective" (2000)
- Best Performance by an Actress in a Leading Role in a Television Drama Series – Anita Hegh (2000)

Logie Awards:

- Most Outstanding Drama Series (2005)
- Most Popular New Female Talent – Katrina Milosevic (2004)
- Most Popular New Male Talent – Daniel Frederiksen (2004)
- Most Outstanding Actor in a Drama Series – Gary Sweet (2004)
- Most Outstanding Actress in a Drama Series – Kate Kendall (2004)
- Most Outstanding Actor in a Drama Series – Gary Sweet (2003)
- Most Outstanding Drama Series (2001)
