= Brendan Cowell =

Australian actor and writer

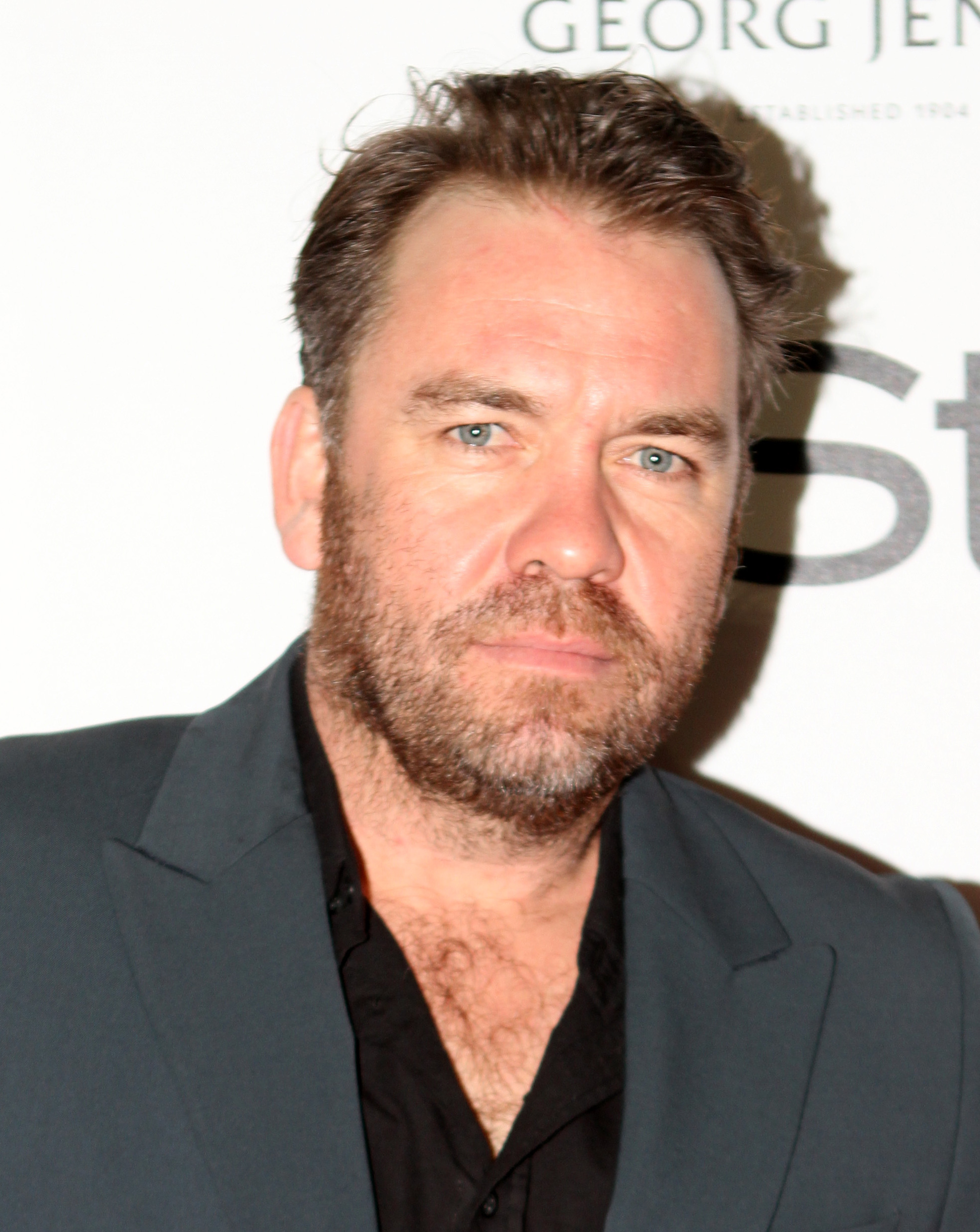
- Cowell in 2015
- Born: Sydney, New South Wales, Australia
- Occupations: Actor, screenwriter, playwright
- Years active: 1986–present
- Partner: Rose Byrne (2003–2010)

Brendan Cowell is an Australian actor and writer. He is known for starring in the 2024 television series Plum, which he adapted for television from his 2021 novel of the same name. In 2026 he appears in a lead role in the mystery thriller TV series Last Seen.

== Early life and education ==
Brendan Cowell was born in Sydney and grew up in the beachside suburb of Cronulla. He credits his mother and high school drama teacher with encouraging him to explore his creative side.

He attended Charles Sturt University in Bathurst to complete a Bachelor of Arts in Theatre/Media.

== Career ==
=== Stage ===
Cowell won the Patrick White Playwrights' Award for his third play, Bed along with a collection of other awards. His play Ruben Guthrie showed at the Belvoir St Theatre in 2009 to sell-out houses. It had a new production at La Boite Theatre in 2011, starring Gyton Grantley and directed by David Berthold.

He won some acclaim for his portrayal of the title role in Bell Shakespeare's 2008 Production of Hamlet and acted in Sydney Theatre Company's production of True West, directed by Philip Seymour Hoffman, in 2010.

The Sublime (Melbourne Theatre Company) was shortlisted for the Nick Enright Prize for Playwriting in the New South Wales Premier's Literary Awards 2015. His play Happy New was performed in London in 2013, starring Joel Samuels, Lisa Dillon and William Troughton. It had previously premiered in Australia.

In 2017 he starred as Galileo Galilei in the Young Vic's production of Bertholt Brecht's Life of Galileo.

=== Television ===
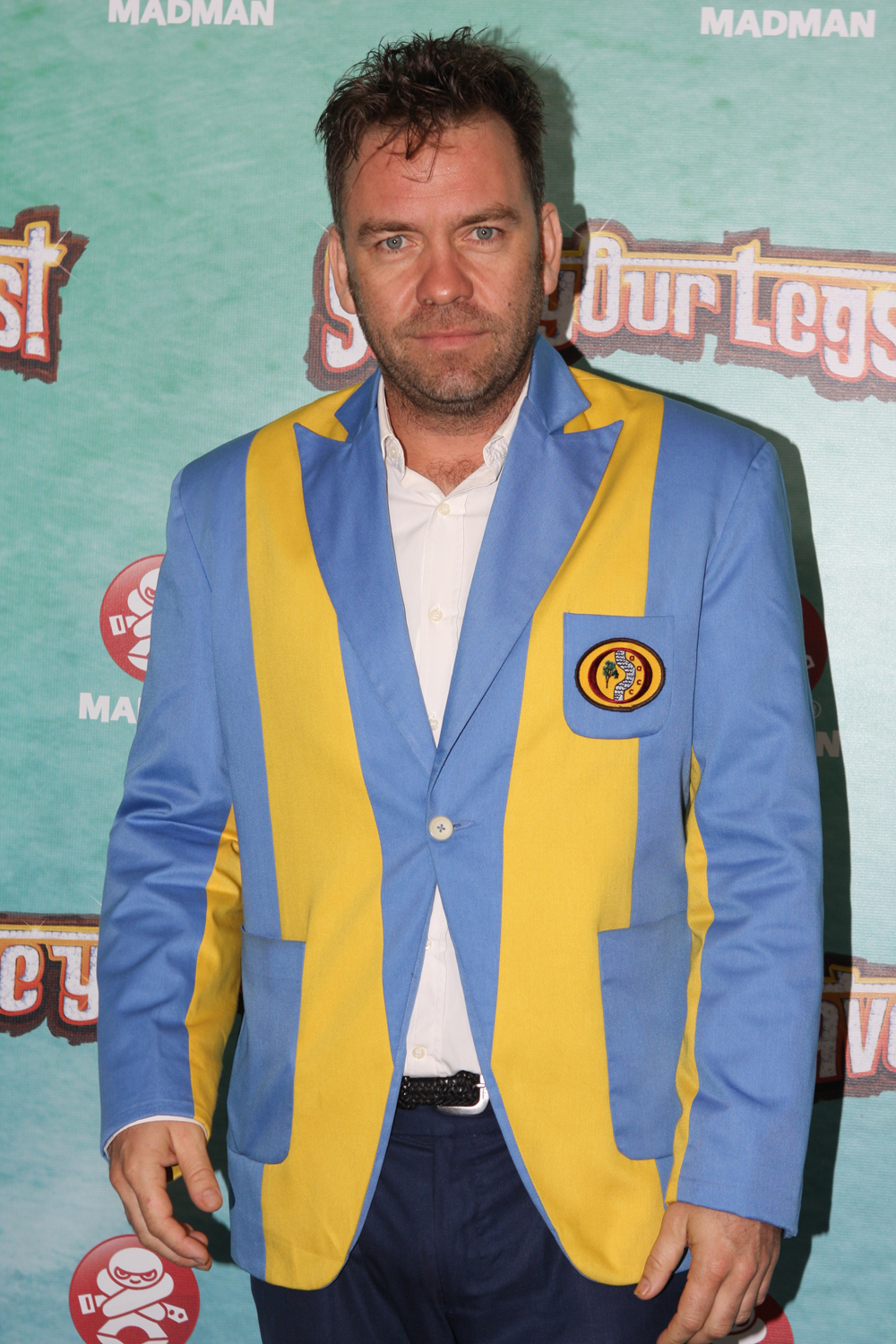
Cowell in February 2013

Cowell played the enigmatic Tom on Australian cable TV's Love My Way, for which he also wrote several episodes, and played Todd for the first two seasons on Life Support on SBS TV, for which he also wrote sketches.

In 2017 Cowell joined the cast of the HBO series Game of Thrones in season 7 as Harrag, an Ironborn sea captain allied to Theon Greyjoy.

In 2024 it was announced that Cowell had begun filming for ABC drama Plum based on his novel of the same name. The series aired on 20 October 2024.

On 27 March 2025, Cowell was named in the cast of Apple TV+ series Last Seen. The series was released on 9 September 2026.

On 13 January 2026, Cowell was named in the cast for the second series of High Country.

=== Film ===
Cowell's acting work in film include roles in the 2007 crime drama Noise, the World War 1 war film Beneath Hill 60, the romantic comedy I Love You Too. and a notable role in Avatar: The Way of Water and Avatar: Fire and Ash as Captain Mick Scoresby.

=== Other writing ===
In 2010 Cowell published his first novel, How it Feels.

== Awards and nominations ==
Year	Award	Category	Work	Result
2005	Logie Awards	Silver Logie for Most Outstanding Actor	Love My Way	Nominated
2006	Logie Awards	Silver Logie for Most Outstanding Actor	Love My Way	Nominated
2007	AFI Awards	Best Lead Actor	Noise	Nominated
2007	AWGIE Awards	Television - Series	Love My Way	Nominated
2007	Inside Film Awards	Best Actor	Noise	Nominated
2007	Logie Awards	Silver Logie for Most Popular Actor	Love My Way	Nominated
2008	ASTRA Awards	Most Outstanding Performance by an Actor	Love My Way	Nominated
2008	Film Critics Circle of Australia	Best Actor	Noise	Won
2010	AFI Awards	Best Lead Actor	Beneath Hill 60	Nominated
2011	Film Critics Circle of Australia	Best Actor	Beneath Hill 60	Nominated
2011	Sydney Theatre Awards	Best Actor in a Leading Role in a Mainstage Production	The Dark Room	Nominated
2012	AACTA Awards	Best Screenplay in Television	The Slap	Won
2012	AWGIE Awards	Television Mini-Series - Adaptation (with Emily Ballou, Alice Bell, Kris Mrksa, and Cate Shortland)	The Slap	Won
2015	AACTA Awards	Best Adapted Screenplay	Ruben Guthrie	Nominated
2015	AWGIE Awards	Feature Film - Adaptation	Ruben Guthrie	Won
2015	ZOOM Awards	Best Director	The Outlaw Michael Howe	Won

== Personal life ==
Cowell dated Rose Byrne for six years until they parted ways amicably in early 2010.

== Performances and works ==
=== Film ===
Key
†	Denotes productions that have not yet been released

Year	Title	Role	Notes
1986	The Siege of Barton's Bathroom	Dominic Barton	Short film
1999	Kick	Macca	
2000	Bored Olives	Robert	
2000	The Monkey's Mask	Hayden	
2001	To End All Wars	Wallace Hamilton	
2003	Floodhouse	Herringbone John	
2005	Deck Dogz	Kurt	
2006	Suburban Mayhem	Interviewer	Voice role
2007	Noise	Graham McGahan	
2008	Three Blind Mice	Glenn Carter	
2008	Ten Empty	Shane Hackett	
2010	Beneath Hill 60	Oliver Woodward	
2010	I Love You Too	Jim	
2012	Save Your Legs!	Rick	
2013	The Darkside		
2015	Last Cab to Darwin	Publican	
2015	Observance	Employer	
2016	Broke	Kirk	
2017	National Theatre Live: Yerma	John	
2017	The Current War	Confederate Soldier	
2022	Avatar: The Way of Water	Captain Mick Scoresby	
2025	Avatar: Fire and Ash	Captain Mick Scoresby	

=== Television ===
Year	Title	Role	Notes
1999	Monster!	Nate	TV film
2001	Water Rats	Jonathan Freeman	Episode: "Family Matters"
2001–2002	Life Support	Todd	Series regular
2002	Young Lions	Jason Doone	2 episodes
2002	White Collar Blue	Daniel Hudson	1 episode
2003	Fat Cow Motel	Jack Green	Mini-series
2004	Salem's Lot	Dud Rogers	Mini-series
2004–2007	Love My Way	Tom Jackson	Series regular
2008	Review with Myles Barlow	As himself	Season 1 Episode 3
2010	Rush	Blake Fincher	Episode: "Cooked"
2011	The Slap	Craig	Episode: "Richie"
2011	Underbelly Files: The Man Who Got Away	Benny O'Connell	TV film
2012	Howzat! Kerry Packer's War	Rodney Marsh	Mini-series
2013	The Borgias	Mattai the Hebrew	5 episodes
2013	The Outlaw Michael Howe	British Soldier	TV film
2014	Wastelander Panda	Isaac	6 episodes, voice role
2014	Soul Mates	Harry Cunston	Episode: "Self Destruction"
2014–2016	Black Comedy	Various roles	4 episodes
2016	Brock	Allan Moffat	Mini-series
2016	Comedy Showroom: The Letdown	Harry	TV film
2017	Game of Thrones	Harrag	3 episodes
2017–2019	The Letdown	Harry	3 episodes
2018	Press	Peter Langley	Series regular
2020	The End	Christopher Brennan	4 episodes
2022	The Twelve	Garry Thorne	10 episodes
2023	The Castaways	Mike Brasse	5 episodes
2024	Plum	Peter 'The Plum' Lum	6 episodes
2024	Dune: Prophecy	Duke Ferdinand Richese	2 episodes
2026	Last Seen	Henry Reid	TV series
2026	High Country: What Lies Beneath	Glenn Gilmour	TV series

=== Theatre ===
Year	Play	Role	Venue	Notes
2000	The Recruit	Jimmy	Wharf 1 Theatre, Sydney, New South Wales	with Sydney Theatre Company
2000	Men	Guy	Old Fitzroy Theatre, Woolloomooloo, Sydney, New South Wales	
2001	Happy New	Lyle	Old Fitzroy Theatre, Woolloomooloo, Sydney, New South Wales	
2003	The Shape of Things	Adam Sorenson	Wharf 1 Theatre, Sydney, New South Wales	with Sydney Theatre Company
2004	Far Away	Todd	Wharf 1 Theatre, Sydney, New South Wales	with Sydney Theatre Company
2006	Dissident, Goes Without Saying	Phillipe	Wharf 2Loud Theatre, Sydney, New South Wales	with Sydney Theatre Company
2008	Hamlet	Prince Hamlet	Drama Theatre, Sydney Opera House, Sydney, New South Wales	with Bell Shakespeare
2010	True West	Austin	Wharf 1 Theatre, Sydney, New South Wales	with Sydney Theatre Company
2011	The Dark Room	Stephen	Downstairs Theatre, Belvoir St Theatre, Sydney, New South Wales	with Company B
2013	Miss Julie	Jean	Upstairs Theatre, Belvoir St Theatre, Sydney, New South Wales	with Belvoir Sydney
2013	The Wild Duck	Hjalmar Ekdal	Vienna Festival & Holland Festival	with Belvoir Sydney
2014	Once in Royal David's City	Will Drummond	Upstairs Theatre, Belvoir St Theatre, Sydney, New South Wales	with Belvoir Sydney
2014	The Wild Duck	Hjalmar Ekdal	Barbican Centre, London & UK Tour	with Belvoir Sydney
2016	Yerma	Juan	Young Vic, London	
2017	Life of Galileo	Galileo Galilei	Young Vic, London	
2018	Dance Nation	Dance Teacher Pat	Almeida Theatre, London	
2018	Yerma	Juan	Park Avenue Armory, New York City	
2022	The Crucible	John Proctor	Olivier Theatre, London	
2025	The Lady from the Sea	Finn Marcet	Bridge Theatre, London	

=== Writing ===
Year	Title	Format	Notes
2000	Men	Play	
2001	Happy New	Play	
2001–2002	Life Support	TV series. Satire. Comedy	Writer (with others) in 4 episodes
2002	Bed	Play	Won the Patrick White Playwrights Award and Fellowship in 2002
2002	ATM	Play	
2002	Sweet Dreams	Short film	Co-written with Anthony Hayes
2002	Running Down These Dreams	Short film. Drama	
2002	Free	Short film. Drama	
2002	Wasted on the Young	Short film. Comedy	
2002	I Love U	Short film. Drama	
2002	Baggage Claim	Short film. Drama	
2002	The Doppelgangers	Short film. Sci-Fi	
2002	Chrono-logic	Short film. Drama	
2003	Rabbit	Play	Won the 2003 Griffin award.
2004	Morph	Play	
2004-2007	Love My Way	TV series	8 episodes
2005	Europe	Short film. Romance	
2007	Ten Empty	Film. Drama	
2009	Ruben Guthrie	Play ISBN 9780868198590	Cowell adapted this as a film script for the 2015 feature film with the same title
2010	How It Feels	Debut novel ISBN 9781405039291	
2011	The Slap	TV series based on Christos Tsiolkas' novel	2 episodes: #1.3 Harry, #1.8 Richie
2012	Save Your Legs!	Feature film. Comedy	
2013	The Outlaw Michael Howe	TV film. Historical drama. Western	
2014	The Sublime	Play	
2015	Ruben Guthrie	Feature film. Dark comedy, drama, romance	
2021	Plum	Second novel ISBN 9781460760505	Audiobook read by Cowell (ISBN 9781460789377). Adapted as a TV series, released in 2024.
2024	Plum	TV series	Writer / Exec producer; 6 episodes

=== Directing ===
Year	Title
2005	Europe
2013	The Outlaw Michael Howe
2015	Ruben Guthrie
