= Janet King (character) =

Fictional character

- Crownies and Janet King character
- Marta Dusseldorp as Janet King
- First appearance: "Episode 1"; 14 July 2011
- Portrayed by: Marta Dusseldorp

In-universe information
- Occupation: Senior Crown Prosecutor
- Family: Graham King (father) Robyn King (mother)
- Significant other: Ash Larsson (deceased)
- Children: Liam King Larsson (son) Emma King Larsson (daughter)
- Nationality: Australian
- Born: 1974

Janet King is a fictional character from the Australian ABC1 legal dramas Crownies and Janet King, played by Marta Dusseldorp. She debuted on-screen in the first episode of Crownies broadcast on 14 July 2011. To prepare, Dusseldorp researched legal cases and observed prosecutors in court. She also visited the NSW Director of Public Prosecutions Nicholas Cowdery and shadowed Margaret Cunneen SC, a Senior Crown Prosecutor and model for the character Janet King. Janet is characterised as a "tough and tenacious" Senior Crown Prosecutor who has worked in the DPP office for ten years. The character is in a same-sex relationship and has children via IVF. When Crownies finished airing plans were made to create a spin-off show centric to the character. Janet King was produced in 2013 with Dusseldorp returning to the title role. The actress has stated that she made deliberate changes to ensure Janet listened to others more often.

The character has been well received by critics. Glen Humphries of the Illawarra Mercury opined that Janet was a "standout character" and Debi Enker labeled her one of Crownies "better" characters. Crikey's Ben Neutze said Janet was the viewers’ favourite. Guy Davis from The Newcastle Herald named her a role model for junior solicitors. While ABC1 Controller Brendan Dahill has publicised his admiration of Dusseldorp's portrayal. In 2014, Dusseldorp won the AACTA Award for Best Lead Actress in a Television Drama for her portrayal of Janet.

== Development ==
=== Creation and casting ===
The character was conceived by associate producer Hilary Bonney and co-producer Jane Allen. Bonney explained that Janet developed from their "combined experiences", as she is a barrister and Allen is a criminal lawyer and writer. Janet is also gay, like Allen. Bonney wrote, "she is a bit of both of us, and of all the women we know and admire who work in criminal law." On 24 January 2011, Greg Hassall from The Sydney Morning Herald announced Dusseldorp's involvement in the show. The following month, Les Kennedy of The Sun-Herald revealed that she had been cast as the drama's senior Crown prosecutor. Dusseldorp spent eight months filming the role for Crownies.

=== Preparation ===
"Watching her take on this vitally important role in society, and do a job that is so emotionally wrenching, helped me build a character that I hoped did crown prosecutors justice."

— Dusseldorp on her time spent with Margaret Cunneen SC (2013)

In preparation for the role Dusseldorp researched numerous legal cases and observed prosecutors behaviour before judges in district courts. She and fellow cast member Lewis Fitz-Gerald (who plays David Sinclair) visited and was welcomed by the Director of Public Prosecutions Nicholas Cowdery. She also shadowed a Senior Crown Prosecutor, Margaret Cunneen SC. Her time with Margaret Cunneen SC found her attending conferences with defence lawyers, psychiatrists and a victim. She also inspected the New South Wales Director of Public Prosecutions office. Dusseldorp found the experience "humbling" and became "addicted" to the serious nature surrounding cases. Dusseldorp explained to a reporter from Lawyers Weekly that she found it challenging when she realised "how atrocious" most cases are. She credited her research for her admiration of the job prosecutors do for the community.

Dusseldorp used her experiences to portray Janet. She told Wendy Tuohy of the Herald Sun she wanted to capture the "public/private dichotomy" of a Prosecutor. She believed they had slight arrogance and were calm and collected when in court. They would not decide to prosecute unless they believed in a conviction. Dusseldorp stated "I feel very much when I do the show I am always working with the truth, and on the right side."

=== Characterisation ===
Senior Crown Prosecutor, Janet King, is a star and one of the most feared and admired advocates at the bar. Steely and immovable, with an armour-piercing gaze and a tongue that can eviscerate a poor argument, she is a consummate professional. Cool but not cold, juries feel she is one of them, a wise, unbiased guide to the truth. Janet will impart her legal wisdom to those who seek her counsel. Gaining her respect is a long road for the uninitiated, but you want her in your corner.

— The official Crownies website on Janet (2011).

Janet studied law at the University of Sydney before being awarded with a Rhodes Scholarship to study at Oxford University. She is an experienced barrister and has worked in the DPP's office for ten years. She is characterised as tough and tenacious, with a sharp tongue and mind. The actress described Janet as "complicated, competent, risky, vicious, loving." Dusseldorp was loath to portray Janet as too "hard-nosed and ball-breaking". Despite Janet's strong willed nature, she said of her portrayal, "I've tried to confess to the audience when I can that she's actually as fragile and full of feeling and love for humanity." The actress also admired how self-assured Janet is.

Dusseldorp has tried to play Janet with little compassion because becoming emotionally involved with victims is not helpful for prosecutors' cases. Instead her compassion is learned over time through situations arising in her personal life. But one storyline really challenged the actress. When Janet deals with a case of child murder, Dusseldorp found it difficult to say her lines without crying. Knowing that Janet would not become emotional she had to overcome the predicament. The series does explore light-hearted stories. Dusseldorp has stated that she plays Janet more "wry than dry" in such scenarios. Dusseldorp's hair was coloured by stylist Timothy Cole especially for the role.

Janet is a lesbian and Dusseldorp told Graeme Watson from "Out in Perth" that viewers were happy with it. She believed that depiction of lesbian characters was not prevalent. She liked her character because “she was one of the most all rounded women” she had played. She told Sacha Molitorisz from The Age "not to give anything away, she's in a lesbian relationship and things spin out of control a bit." Janet becomes pregnant via in vitro fertilisation and as a mother of two, Dusseldorp felt able to portray pregnancy accurately. The pregnancy and relationship storyline was played out as a background sub-plot.

=== Janet King spin-off ===
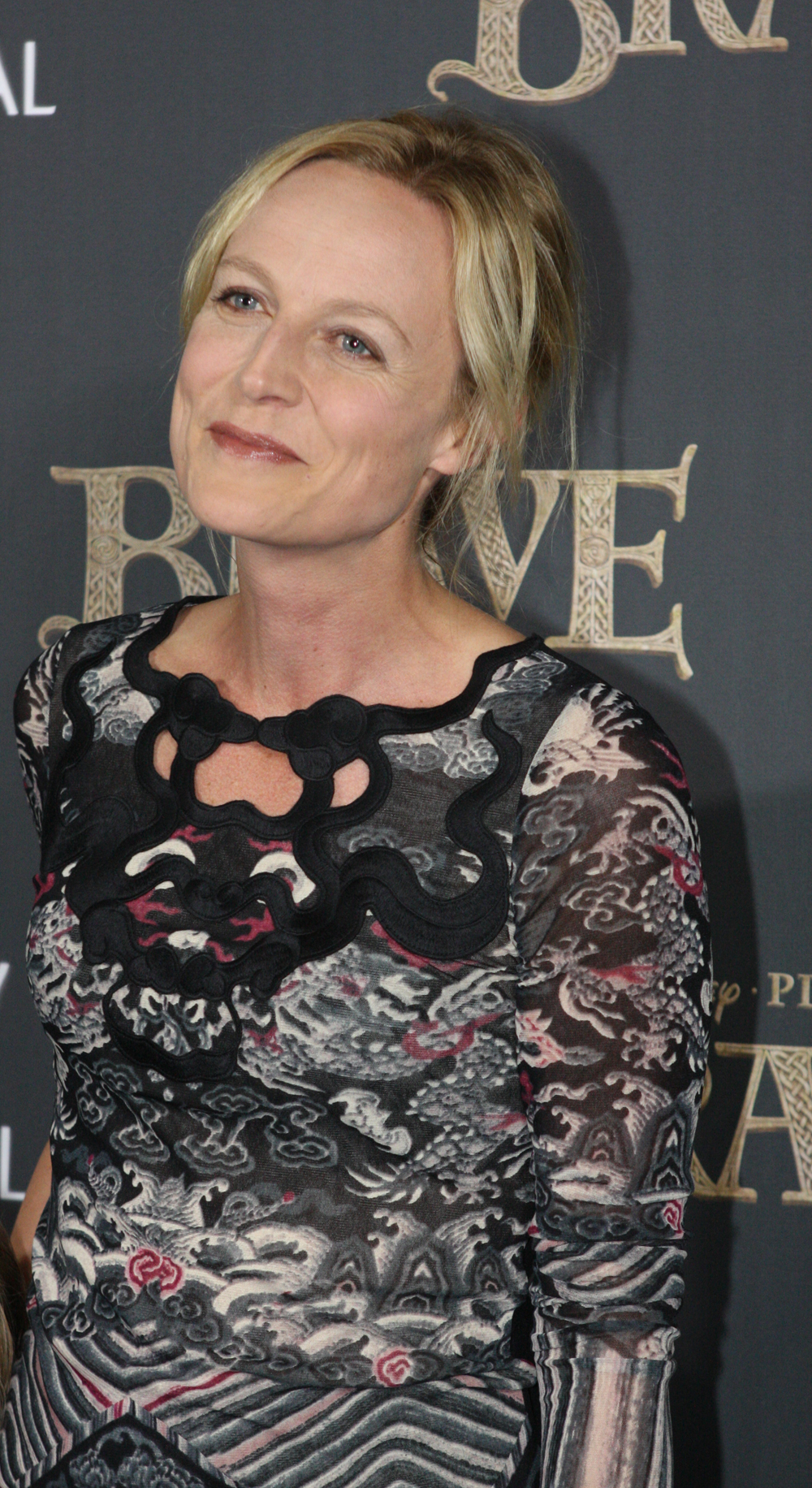
ABC1 Controller Brendan Dahill praised Dusseldorp's portrayal.

Prior to Crownies final airing, ABC1 Channel Controller Brendan Dahill revealed that he wanted a spin-off to be created. He also cited Dusseldorp and Michael as his favourite performers. On 20 August 2012, ABC TV confirmed that it had commissioned an "8-part legal and political thriller" titled Janet King. ABC's Head of Fiction, Carole Sklan branded Janet a "fabulous character" and the series would be "exciting" and centric around Janet. She added "the series looks at the dilemmas of a contemporary woman who returns to work after a year's maternity leave and is flung into a shocking prosecution that involves layers of intrigue played out at the highest levels of power. Janet King's case leads her through some astounding twists and revelations that impact on her life on every level." Screentime's Des Monaghan said that it had become obvious to his company and the ABC that the audience had developed "a great deal" of affection for the character of Janet and was happy to build on that success. It was also revealed that more of the cast of Crownies would return alongside Dusseldorp. Sklan later revealed more details in a press release. She stated "Janet returns to the DPP to confront a high-profile murder and a conspiracy which will threaten to unravel her life and everything she loves." She also praised Dusseldorp's portrayal of Janet as "compelling and captivating".

Dusseldorp loves playing Janet but often finds the experience a "harrowing" one. She told Elissa Blake from The Sydney Morning Herald that Janet "never shuts up". She believed that in Crownies Janet did not listen to others - "she knew what she knew and that was that". But she deliberately played her differently in Janet King and despite admiring her superior trait; Dusseldorp felt the need to tone it down. Janet's foray into motherhood also makes her uncertain if she wants to return to work. The actress added that "then, just as she's wondering if it's all worth it, she's propelled into a series of horrors."

== Storylines ==
Janet prosecutes in a case of a murdered teenager. She and Lina Badir (Andrea Demetriades) then go to the trial and the suspect is found guilty. When a secret file is leaked to the press, Janet reprimands Lina, Erin O'Shaughnessy (Ella Scott Lynch), Ben McMahon (Todd Lasance), Richard Stirling (Hamish Michael) and Tatum Novak (Indiana Evans). The Office of the DPP becomes under bombardment from journalists. Janet and David make it clear that they will end the career of the culprit. Janet then deals with more harrowing cases ranging from child murder to a drawn-out fraud case.

Erin learns that Janet is pregnant and they form a friendship. But when Erin turns a case down Janet becomes harsh with her explaining that she needs to become less emotionally involved. Janet uses her experience to get Tina Chang (Tasneem Roc) to testify in court but she is later attacked. This and other cases make her feel the pressure of work and pregnancy. She then helps Ben on a case following the murder of his grandfather. Janet is faced with many problems but some advice from Tony Gillies (Peter Kowitz) secures a prosecution. Janet goes to have her first scan with partner Ashleigh Larsson (Aimee Pedersen). They later discover that they are having twins but there is a possibility of a foetal disability. When she later discovers the sex of the babies she accidentally tells Ash when, after Ash has bought the cribs for the twins, Janet says "just don't buy one blue and one pink bedding", which reveals the babies' sex. Ash is elated at the prospect of having a boy and a girl.

Janet and Lina become conflicted over the mental state of a child accused of murder, Max Gardiner (Nicholas Bakopoulos-Cooke). Despite Janet's reluctance to prosecute him, David forces her to. The case proves controversial in the office and Janet and Lina fail to change their stance on the case. Following a series of developments Max eventually is found innocent. Janet is shocked when Max is found dead and promises to try to help the family again. She also promises to help Sean Gardiner (David Franklin) defeat charges but the DPP override her. Janet helps Erin out following her troubles but then Erin gets drunk at Janet's during dinner that evening. Erin apologises by throwing a baby shower for Janet. Janet's maternity leave approaches but she continues with large work loads. David decides Janet should be shifted onto smaller cases instead despite her reluctance. Janet goes into labour without Ash and Erin is forced to comfort her.

== Reception ==
Ben Neutze from Crikey believed that Janet was the viewers favourite Crownies character. He opined that combined with Dusseldorp's raised acting profile the spin-off series would be successful. "Out in Perth's" Watson branded her a "professional, detached, incredibly intelligent, ambitious and amazing" character. A writer from Lawyers Weekly branded Janet the "head-honcho" of Crownies. Guy Davis from The Newcastle Herald branded Janet a mentor and role model to the junior solicitors. Glen Humphries of the Illawarra Mercury opined that Janet was a "standout character" and "hard-nosed workaholic". Critic Debi Enker has also echoed that Janet was one of Crownies "better" characters and Dusseldorp one of the "standout" actors. The Sydney Morning Herald's Ruth Ritchie said "perennial hard workers Jeanette Cronin, Marta Dusseldorp, Lewis Fitz-Gerald and Peter Kowitz are all at their best. They bring nuance and heft to their wonderfully written characters." His colleague Doug Anderson described Janet as a veteran solicitor who "is as tough as they come but she is also vulnerable".

Nicholas Cowdery of The Sun-Herald said that Janet represented "the independence and courage of the DPP" and viewed it as "heartening". While fellow reporter Elissa Blake described her "fearless lawyer with cool intelligence and subtle sex appeal." While Greg Hassall believed Janet was one of the show's strong characters and Dusseldorp deserved a Logie Award. The Age's Larissa Dubecki said that Dusseldorp's portrayal of Janet taking on the case of Ben's grandfather death "exudes gravitas"; despite having to recite "clunky expository dialogue about the jury system".

For her portrayal of Janet, Dusseldorp won the Best Lead Actress in a Television Drama accolade at the 4th AACTA Awards in 2014. The following year, she was nominated for the Logie Award for Most Outstanding Actress.
