= Crown prosecutor (Australia) =

Legal profession

Crown prosecutors are the public prosecutors in the legal system of Australia. In Western Australia, they are referred to as State prosecutors.

Crown prosecutors represent the Crown in right of the Commonwealth and in right of each state or Territory in criminal proceedings. Crown prosecutors are appointed (not elected) and are not public servants; they are private counsel briefed by the Director of Public Prosecutions for particular cases.

Both the Commonwealth of Australia and the states and territories can make criminal laws under the Constitution of Australia, so Crown prosecutors deal with both state and federal offences. The typical Crown prosecutor, often a King's Counsel or Senior Counsel, will have extensive experience as defence counsel as well as prosecuting counsel, across a full spectrum of legal disciplines.

== History, role and function ==
The Office of the Director of Public Prosecutions (DPP) was derived from the United Kingdom in the 19th Century. Their role was created to further the separation of powers and remove prosecutorial decisions from the legislature and any political influence. This was partly driven by the fact Attorneys-General are attached to the ministry and parliament. Thus to ensure integrity and fairness in the judicial process, it was deemed prudent to develop an independent body to deal with, what can be, often controversial and politically damaging decisions. Lastly, prosecutors' main functions are statutorily derived from the Director of Public Prosecutors Act 1986 (NSW). From a procedural perspective, the ODPP has also absorbed the International Association of Prosecutor's Standards of Professional Responsibility and Statement of the Essential Duties and Rights of Prosecutors, into their practices and guidelines.

Crown prosecutors are independent and perform a unique function. Their role is to represent the community or 'the Crown' in criminal trials, and seek to assist the court and steer the jury toward the truth as well as providing justice to the victim and the wider community. As their role is independent, they will always seek to provide the jury with all relevant and credible evidence that they have been presented with for an alleged crime, without the intention of achieving victory or loss. This notion of not solely seeking to obtain a conviction was conveyed by the Canadian Supreme Court in Boucher v The Queen (1954) 110 CCC 263 at 270; “It cannot be over-emphasised that the purpose of a criminal prosecution is not to obtain a conviction; it is to lay before a jury what the Crown considers to be credible evidence relevant to what is alleged to be a crime. Counsel have a duty to see that all available legal proof of the facts is presented: it should be done firmly and pressed to its legitimate strength, but it must also be done fairly.”

To clarify, the ODPP is the main prosecutorial body responsible for representing the Crown in criminal trials. Crown prosecutors are barristers who are briefed, by the ODPP, to appear on behalf of the Crown and perform prosecutorial and other ancillary functions. Further, the ODPP and by extension crown prosecutors do not investigate crimes. The respective police force in each state or territory is responsible for the investigative aspect of an alleged criminal offence. The prosecutor's role is to firstly, determine whether the evidence is strong enough and/or admissible in a court proceedings. And secondly, to then use that brief of evidence and act for the Crown in presenting that evidence to the jury to deliberate and make a decision.

A growing conflict with prosecutorial duties is becoming the duty of disclosure. As aforementioned, a major component of the prosecutorial function is the exercise of procedural fairness and absolute adherence to judicial principles and prosecutorial guidelines. Duties of disclosures relate to instances whereby the police and/or prosecutors do not disclose all available information to the opposing counsel in an attempt to disguise the true appearance of the facts. Recent Australian cases where this has been an issue include R v Easterday (2003) 143 A Crim R 154 and R v Sonnet [2010] VSCA 315.

== Appointment process ==
This section will focus on the appointment and eligibility requirements to become or be eligible to be appointed as a crown prosecutor. Each state has different legislation that is responsible for the appointment process. All prosecutors generally have the same requirements. Using NSW as a case study, appointments are made pursuant to the 'Crown Prosecutors Act 1986 (NSW). They firstly must be a qualified Australian legal practitioner. Secondly, crown prosecutors must also be members of the private bar, in NSW known as the New South Wales Bar Association. To be appointed at the bar as a barrister, one must receive the required standard of 75% in the NSW Bar Examination along with other administrative components. Once a member of the private bar, barristers can be appointed by the Governor to serve as Crown Prosecutors. The main condition of their appointment is viewed below:

Section 4(2A) – 'A Crown Prosecutor is to be appointed by the Governor for a term of 7 years or for such shorter term as may be necessary to ensure that the person's term of office extends to (but not beyond) the date on which the person reaches the age of 72 years. A Crown Prosecutor is eligible (if otherwise qualified) for reappointment.'

At the moment, there are currently 124 crown prosecutors in NSW.

Another role that exists within this is that of a Senior Crown Prosecutor. This follows a similar process of appointment to that of the Crown Prosecutors, outlined in section 4A. Senior Crown Prosecutors have the same roles and responsibilities; however, they represent the Crown in the most serious and complex matters. Their remuneration and tenure is fixed, yet the remuneration is slightly higher to reflect the added seniority and complexity of the job.

== Controversies ==
There have been recent instances where Crown and Senior Crown Prosecutors have found themselves under the microscope of investigations and been charged or publicly reprimanded. Particularly, Margaret Cunneen being summoned before ICAC and Mark Tedeschi's numerous misconduct allegations and complaints.

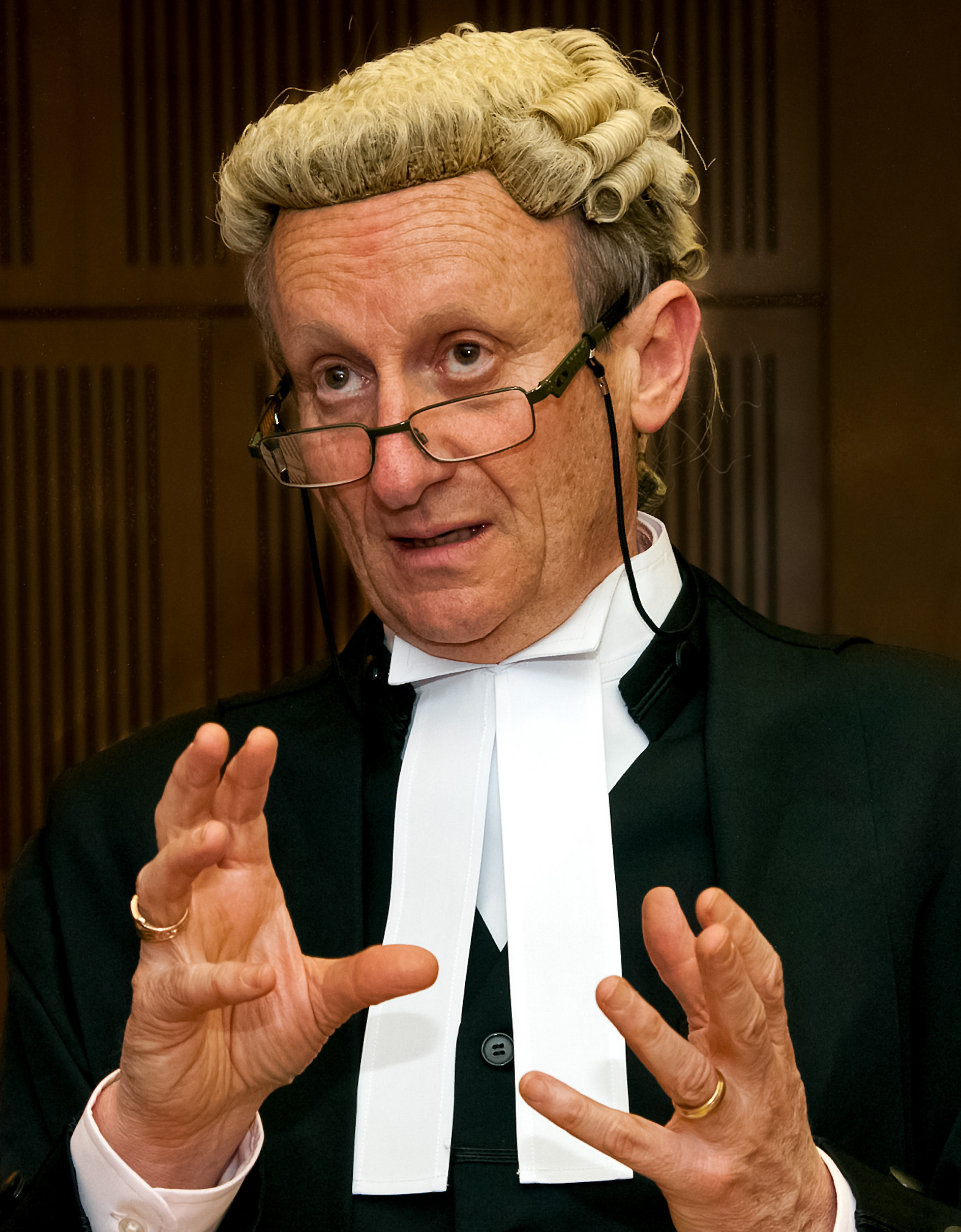
Mark Tedeschi, AM, QC

In October 2014, ICAC established ‘Operation Hale’ to investigate allegations that in May 2014, Margaret Cunneen had advised her eldest son's girlfriend to fake chest pains to avoid a roadside breath test at the scene of a car crash. and also whether she lied about aspects of the accident to the insurance agency and DPP. Cunneen sought an injunction against ICAC in the NSW Supreme Court on two grounds: (1) a declaration ICAC was exceeding its jurisdictional scope; and (2) a declaration that the ICAC's decision to hold a public inquiry was invalid. Cunneen appealed the initial decision of the Supreme Court, which went in ICAC's favor, to the NSW Court of Appeal. In Cunneen v ICAC, a 2:1 majority of the NSW Court of Appeal held, inter alia, that the impugned conduct was not corrupt conduct as stipulated in s 8(2) of the Independent Commission Against Corruption Act 1988 (NSW) (‘ICAC Act’). In addition, the Court also ruled that ICAC's decision to hold such a public inquiry was unreasonable. ICAC appealed the Supreme Court's decision to the High Court, given the significance of this decision on future investigations. On 15 April 2015, via a 4:1 majority the High Court held in favor of the respondent (Cunneen), that the conduct was not corrupt within the meaning of the ‘ICAC Act’. Subsequently, amendments were made to the ICAC Act, resulting in the Independent Commission Against Corruption Amendment Act 2015 (NSW) (‘ICAC Act’).

Mark Tedeschi AM QC is another high-profile Senior Crown Prosecutor who has faced accusations and allegations for misconduct and malicious prosecution. Tedeschi was a regarded Crown Prosecutor, securing convictions in high-profile trials of Ivan Milat, the political assassin Phuong Ngo and the infamous case of the baby killer Keli Lane. Nevertheless, during the appeal of Gordon Wood's murder conviction, the appeal judges issued scathing commentary on the conduct of Tedeschi during the trial as they threw out Mr. Wood's murder conviction. The judges accused Tedeschi of failing his core obligation as a prosecutor, which is to portray the case fairly to the jury. They alleged Mr. Tedeschi tried to artificially inflate the strength of the Crown case by employing fiction, inadmissible reasoning and ambiguity that suggested Wood had been in a relationship with the deceased to delineate and convince the jury Caroline Byrne could not have committed suicide. Other instances of complaints have also come from former Ananda Marga member, Tim Anderson who sought action against Mark Tedeschi after a 1991 Appeal Court dismissed Anderson's conviction for the murder of three people in the Hilton Hotel Bombing. He claimed Legal Aid have laid almost fifty complaints to the NSW Bar Council against Tedeschi. In addition, former NSW Drug Squad undercover detective Paul Kenny states he was a victim of Tedeschi's prosecutorial tactics. Kenny was charged by internal affairs police with conspiring to pervert the course of justice and demanding bribes from a heroin dealer. Tedeschi led the prosecution; however ultimately withdrew the charges. Tedeschi's handling of the case came under scrutiny by a judicial inquiry with Justice Nader noting, “[he found it] frightening that [Tedeschi] didn't even concede the possibility that Kenny was innocent”. The inquiry found no evidence that suggested Tedeschi had acted improperly.

== Commonwealth prosecutors ==
Whilst the majority of crown prosecutors belong to one of the independent state agencies, such as the ODPP NSW or the OPP VIC, an independent prosecutorial body exists that is responsible for the prosecution of crimes against the Commonwealth as well as the provision of advice to agencies. This prosecution agency is called the Office of the Commonwealth Director of Public Prosecutions or, colloquially, the Commonwealth Director of Public Prosecutions (CDPP). Established by parliament under the Director of Public Prosecutions Act 1983 (the DPP Act), the service seeks to prosecute alleged offences against Commonwealth Law. This originally pertained to acts committed under the Crimes Act 1914 (Cth) and the Commonwealth Criminal Code.

In more recent times, Commonwealth crown prosecutors have overseen and covered areas such as commercial and financial crimes, human exploitation and border protection, illegal trade, organised crime and counter terrorism along with revenue and benefits fraud. Previous Commonwealth Directors of the CDPP and established senior crown prosecutors include Ian Temby AO, QC, Christopher Craigie SC, Michael Rozenes QC and the current director – Sarah McNaughton SC.

== In the media ==
Two prominent Australian television shows have been made that depict the role of crown prosecutors. These are Crownies and its subsequent spin-off series Janet King.

=== Crownies ===
Crownies depicts the life of five recently graduated solicitors as they navigate the fast-paced and morally challenging workplace that is the Office of the Director of Public Prosecutions, whilst working alongside crown prosecutors. There was twenty two episodes run which were broadcast on ABC1 from 14 July until 1 December 2011. Crownies was written by Greg Haddrick and produced by Karl Zwicky. The main cast included: Todd Lasance as Ben McMahon, Hamish Michael as Richard Sterling, Marta Dusseldorp as Janet King and Jerome Ehlers as Rhys Kowalski. The character of Janet King was later spun-off into its own show. In critical analysis, a Craig Mathieson article in the Sydney Morning Herald drew correlations to the US hit show, Greys Anatomy. This pertained to the “overlap of professional stress and personal relationships, the overt melodrama, the comic diversions.” Crownies was nominated for an Equity Award for Most Outstanding Performance by an Ensemble in a Drama Series in March 2012.

=== Janet King ===
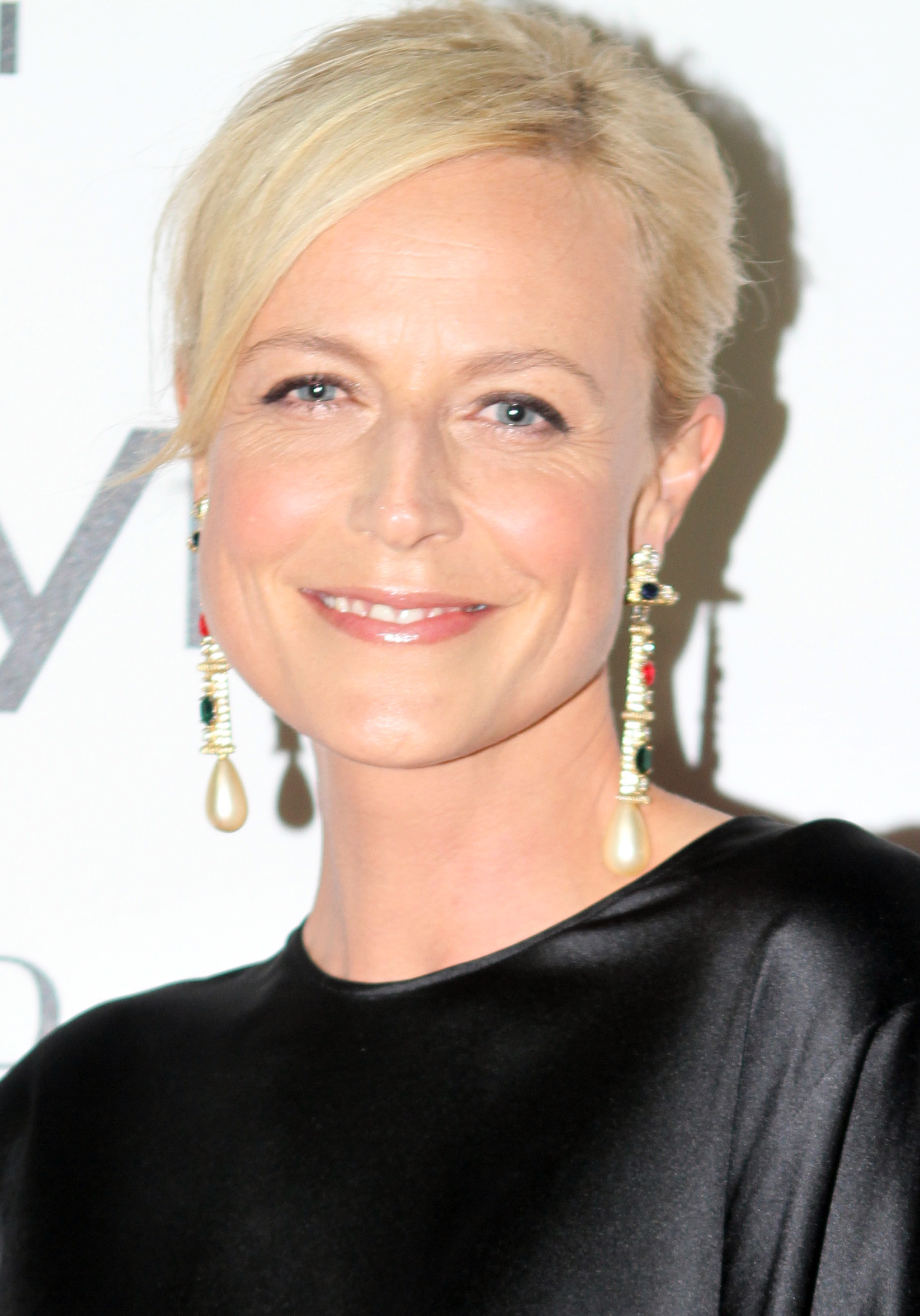
Marta Dusseldorp, lead actress who played Janet King in Crownies and the subsequent spin-off series

Janet King was first aired on ABC1 on the 27th February 2014 as a spin-off from the 2011 legal drama Crownies. The show was 'spun-off' due to modest reviews in the original Crownies 22-part season and wanting to focus on certain positive aspects of the original show. The show was starred by Marta Dusseldorp who played Janet King in the original show, and featured many of her other supporting actors including; Hamish Michael (Richard Sterling), Ella Scott Lynch (Erin O’Shaughnessy), Andrea Demetriades (Lina Badir), Peter Kowitz (Tony Gillies), Christopher Morris (Andy Campbell) and Indiana Evans (Tatum Novak). The show was split into three seasons, focusing on her involvement in the Department of Public Prosecutions (Season 1), her leading role in the Royal Commission into Serious Firearm Crime (Series 2), and culminating with her lead role in a National Crime Commission investigation into organised crime in sport (Season 3). The show was well-received with Ben Pobjie commenting that it was a “high-class act” that managed to overcome the “inherent staleness of legal drama”. The show received accolades and nominations with Marta Dusseldorp winning the Best Lead Actress in a Television Drama in the 2014 AACTA Awards. The show Janet King was also nominated for Best Television Drama Series in the same awards. Marta was also subsequently nominated for Most Outstanding Actress in the 2015 Logie Awards.

== See also ==
- Crown attorneys in Canada
- Crown Prosecution Service in England and Wales
- District attorneys in the United States
- Procurator fiscal in Scotland
- Director of Public Prosecutions (New South Wales)
- Director of Public Prosecutions (Australia)
- Director of Public Prosecutions (Victoria)
