= Margaret Cunneen =

Australian barrister, prosecutor, commissioner

Margaret Cunneen SC
- Born: Margaret Mary Cunneen; 15 January 1959 (age 67); Darlinghurst, New South Wales, Australia
- Education: NSW Institute of Technology (now University of Technology, Sydney); University of Sydney
- Occupations: Barrister; Prosecutor; Commissioner
- Employer: New South Wales Office of the Director of Public Prosecutions
- Spouse: Greg Wyllie
- Children: 3

Margaret Mary Cunneen SC (born 15 January 1959 in Sydney) is an Australian barrister, prosecutor and commissioner of a government inquiry.

== Background and early career ==
Cunneen was born at St. Margaret's Hospital in Darlinghurst, the daughter of John and Catherine Cunneen. Her father was a civil engineer who became chief of the NSW Water Resources Commission. Cunneen grew up in the south western suburbs of Sydney, and was educated at Santa Sabina College, Strathfield.

She joined the Attorney General's Department in 1977, working in the Ministerial office. She was an Industrial Officer at the Public Service Board of NSW from 1981 to 1986, when she transferred to what is now the New South Wales Office of the Director of Public Prosecutions where her immediate manager was Megan Latham. After commencing study part-time in 1977, she graduated with a Bachelor of Laws from the NSW Institute of Technology in 1982 and a Master of Laws from the University of Sydney in 1989. In 1982, she was admitted a legal practitioner of the New South Wales Supreme Court. In 2014 she was awarded the Law Alumni Award by the University of Technology.

== Crown Prosecutor ==
Cunneen was a Deputy Senior Crown Prosecutor in the NSW Office of the Director of Public Prosecutions and has held a commission as a Crown Prosecutor since 1990. She came to prominence when she prosecuted a series of highly publicised pedophiles and several notable gang rape and murder trials.

In October 2007, Cunneen was appointed as Senior Counsel and her peers at the Bar elected her as one of 21 members of the Bar Council of New South Wales. She is a Bar Councillor, having received the second highest number of votes in the 2014 Bar Council elections.

Between 1995 and 2009, Cunneen was a lecturer in child abuse and neglect, focusing on the court system, at the Faculty of Social Work at the University of New South Wales.

In April 2007, The Sydney Morning Herald reported that Cunneen had been removed as prosecutor in the trial of an alleged gang rapist after the court found there would be a perception of unfairness if she acted in the case. Cunneen had referred to the case, although without naming it and speaking only in reference to the deleterious effects on the victim arising from the seven–year delay in concluding it, during the Sir Ninian Stephen Lecture in 2005 at Newcastle University. Cunneen's lecture was described by Justice David Levine as "the most articulate commentary on the criminal justice system, in my opinion". The decision to remove her was criticised by the New South Wales Bar Association, however it was not appealed by the Director of Public Prosecutions. John Marsden wrote to the Legal Services Commissioner, calling Cunneen "a disgrace to our profession". His complaint was dismissed.

In 2010, Cunneen as a private citizen, gave character evidence for Brett Stewart, referring to his having campaigned in New Guinea against violence towards women, in Sydney's District Court in his trial after an allegation of sexual assault. Stewart was found not guilty by the jury in under an hour's deliberation.

== ICAC investigation ==
Following a serious car accident involving the girlfriend of one of her sons, it was alleged by an anonymous complainant that Cunneen, her son (Stephen Wyllie), and his injured girlfriend (Sophia Tilley) attempted to influence the outcome of police inquiries into the accident by attempting to pervert the course of justice. Cunneen rejected the claims against her. Cunneen was accused of advising Sophia Tilley to fake chest pains to avoid a breath test after the car accident.

The Independent Commission Against Corruption (ICAC) announced on 29 October 2014 that it would begin investigations into her alleged actions. Independent witnesses at the scene vouched that Tilley was being treated in the ambulance before the police, and later Cunneen, arrived. Tilley, who was not the at-fault driver, was blood-tested at hospital and recorded 0.00. Cunneen submitted that the failure of ICAC to clearly illustrate the reasons for their decision to investigate Cunneen's alleged conduct was to commission an investigation, thereby acting beyond their powers. Cunneen successfully appealed to the New South Wales Court of Appeal, and ICAC was granted leave for the matter to be heard before the High Court of Australia.

On 15 April 2015 the High Court found that ICAC had exceeded its authority based on its misinterpretation of "corrupt conduct" in the ICAC Act. The Court ruled that Cunneen's alleged conduct, had it occurred, might have affected an official's choice of action, but would not have affected the official's probity in making that choice. The High Court also held that the alleged conduct could not have amounted to corruption. The Court accepted that the alleged conduct of Cunneen, had it occurred, would have been in a private and not an official capacity, and also found that the alleged conduct could not have amounted to corruption. ICAC was ordered to pay costs.

On 27 May 2015, ICAC referred the allegations against Cunneen, Wyllie and Tilley to the New South Wales Director of Public Prosecutions. The DPP referred the matter to the Attorney General, who referred it to the Solicitor General. The Solicitor General, after obtaining advice from senior counsel in another state in view of Cunneen's prominence in the NSW legal profession, determined that there was no evidence whatever warranting the prosecution of any of them for any offence. Following this decision, Cunneen criticised ICAC's powers as "extraordinarily draconian".

=== Notable cases ===
Notable cases defended by Cunneen included

R v Jarryd Hayne – sentenced to 4 years and 9 months for sexual assault

R v Kulwinder Singh – Mr Singh was found not guilty, by a jury, of murdering his wife after all forensic evidence indicated self-harm.

R v Wang Jing – a Chinese movie producer on trial, with a Chinese movie star Gavin Gao, for sexual assault. Both men were found not guilty by a jury.

R v Omar Omar – charged with shooting dead a man who had driven to his home intending to shoot my client’s brother. He was found not guilty by the jury when the prosecution evidence was found to be insufficient to prove any case against him.

R v MG – charged with sexually assaulting a young women who had invited him to her home to have sexual intercourse. She was found, after subpoena, to have made false allegations against another man. Mr G was found not guilty of all charges by a jury.

R v SM – a young solicitor had been charged with sexually assaulting another solicitor who had sought to remain with him in the office for many hours into the night. The trial revealed that the complainant was involved in an intimate relationship with a more senior solicitor and was not dependant on the accused for her employment, as she had falsely claimed. SM was found not guilty by the jury.

R v Blake Davis – killed a man by striking his head with a Samurai sword. The victim had invaded Mr Davis' home, brandishing a gun, and punched Mr Davis in the eye with knuckle-dusters, rendering him momentarily unconscious. When he came to, he could hear his partner screaming from down the street. He picked up the nearest object he could use, a ceremonial sword on display just inside his front door. Mr Davis was found not guilty of murder but guilty of manslaughter. He was of otherwise good character and was sentenced to just over 2 years’ custody. He has since been released and is starting a new life.

Notable cases prosecuted by Cunneen include:

- Robert 'Dolly' Dunn
- Diane Fingleton – the Chief Magistrate of Queensland, convicted of the offence of intimidation of a witness; subsequently overturned on appeal by the High Court of Australia;
- Colin Fisk and Phillip Bell – convicted for pedophilia;
- Jeffrey Gilham – ;
- Michael Guider;
- Michael Kanaan – for the shooting of a police officer;
- The four Khan Brothers, commonly called The K brothers
- William Matheson – the murderer of Disney cartoonist Lyndsay van Blanken
- Paul Peters – the man who put a fake collar bomb around the neck of Sydney teenager Madeleine Pulver
- Graeme Reeves – the so-called Butcher of Bega
- Bilal Skaf
- Quoc Vinh To – convicted of rape
- Newcastle triple murderer Anthony Richard Dent

In 2004 it was reported that Cunneen's advice to Nicholas Cowdery, the NSW Director of Public Prosecutions, concerning sexual abuse allegations against an Australian swimming coach, Scott Volkers, was leaked. It was reported that Cunneen's advice stated that "the inevitable conclusion from the brief as a whole is that Scott Volkers was a thoroughly disreputable man, given to inappropriate touching and comments towards young swimmers in his charge." But it warned that the situation was "complicated by the fondness of many for him." Her final assessment of the matter was that "prosecution of these old matters being so relatively minor would erode public confidence in the course of the criminal justice system." In July 2014 Cunneen made a statement to the Royal Commission into Institutional Responses to Child Sexual Abuse.

== Commissioner ==
On 9 November 2012, Cunneen was appointed Commissioner of the NSW Special Commission of Inquiry into matters relating to the police investigation of certain child sexual abuse allegations in the Roman Catholic Diocese of Maitland-Newcastle. Commissioner Cunneen reported to the NSW Governor Marie Bashir on 30 May 2014.

== Commonwealth Integrity Commission ==
On 18 December 2018, Cunneen was appointed to the panel of experts who will advise Government on the development of the legislation for the Commonwealth Integrity Commission.

== Personal life ==
Cunneen lives in Sydney's North Shore. She has three sons, born in 1988, 1990 and 1992. She is married to Grandmaster Gregory Wyllie, 9th Dan, who runs a taekwondo school, Wyllie Martial Arts.

The fictional character Janet King, in the ABC TV drama series of the same name, is believed to be loosely based on Cunneen.
