= Swimming Australia =

Competitive swimming governing body

- IOC nation: AUS
- Sport: Swimming
- Official website: www.swimming.org.au

History
- Year of formation: 1909
- Former names: Australian Swimming

Demographics
- Number of affiliated Swimming clubs: 1,100 estimated
- Membership size: 100,000 estimated

Affiliations
- International federation: World Aquatics
- World Aquatics members page: www.fina.org
- World Aquatics member since: 1909
- Continental association: Oceania Swimming Association
- National Olympic Committee: Australian Olympic Committee
- Member of NOC since: 1896
- National Paralympic Committee: Australian Paralympic Committee
- Member of NPC since: 1990
- Other affiliation(s): Australian Commonwealth Games Association

Board
- President: Chris Fydler
- Board: Matt Abood; Shaun Creighton; Melissa Fein; Tim Ford; Iain Melhuish; Alice Williams; Matt Dunn; Susan Smith

Organisation Structure
- Chief Executive: Rob Woodhouse
- Head Coach: Rohan Taylor

Finance
- Sponsors: Tech Mahindra / Arena

Swimming Australia is the peak governing body for competitive swimming in Australia. The body has approximately 100,000 registered members nationally in 1100 clubs across the country, which includes swimmers, coaches, officials, administrators and volunteers. The body oversees the management and development of the sport from the national team at the elite level, the conduct of national and international events, through to grass roots participation.

In 1985, the organisation had approximately 90,000 registered members.

== History ==
Competitive national swimming championships were first held in 1894. Australia had swimmers at most major international swimming events since the 1896 Summer Olympics.

This interest led to the creation of the Amateur Swimming Union of Australia, the precursor to Swimming Australia, which was founded in 1909 at a meeting of state swimming representatives at the Sports Club on Hunter Street in Sydney's CBD. There they established a charter which included the key features of the promotion of uniformity of rules and regulations across Australia; the adjudication all matters of disputes between affiliated associations; the control and management of swimmers visiting Australia; the control and management of Australian representatives in any contest of international nature; and control the recognition of all "best on record" performances.

Within a short time the Amateur Swimming Union of Australia had extended its charter to include negotiation with the recently formed International Swimming Federation (Fédération Internationale de Natation, FINA).

James Taylor was the foundation president and served for the first 35 years of the body's existence from 1909 to 1944.

During 1985, under a new corporate structure, the Amateur Swimming Union of Australia was incorporated in the Australian Capital Territory and became Australian Swimming Inc.

On 1 October 2004, Australian Swimming became a company limited by guarantee and changed its name to Swimming Australia Ltd. Glenn Tasker served as the chief executive officer until June 2008, and the organisation's headquarters is located at Unit 12, 7 Beissel Street, Belconnen, ACT. In 2013, Mark Anderson was appointed CEO.

The Australian Swim Team underwent a rebranding in 2014 and was renamed the Australian Dolphins Swimming Team.

In 2022, it established the Swimming Australia Hall of Fame.

Swimming Australia supports and runs the Swimming Australia National Training Centre at the Australian Institute of Sport in Canberra.

== Australian Swimmers of the Year ==
Swimming Australia announces a number of awards annually, most notably the Australian Swimmer of the Year Award.

Year	Winner	State
1990	Glen Housman	Queensland
1991	Hayley Lewis	Queensland
1992	Kieren Perkins	Queensland
1993	Kieren Perkins	Queensland
1994	Kieren Perkins	Queensland
1995	Susie O'Neill	Queensland
1996	Susie O'Neill	Queensland
1997	Michael Klim	Victoria
1998	Michael Klim	Victoria
1999	Ian Thorpe	New South Wales
2000	Ian Thorpe	New South Wales
2001	Ian Thorpe	New South Wales
2002	Ian Thorpe	New South Wales
2003	Ian Thorpe; Grant Hackett	New South Wales; Queensland
2004	Jodie Henry	Queensland
2005	Grant Hackett	Queensland
2006	Leisel Jones	Queensland
2007	Libby Lenton	Queensland
2008	Stephanie Rice	Queensland
2009	Jessicah Schipper	Queensland
2010	Alicia Coutts	Queensland
2011	James Magnussen	New South Wales
2012	Alicia Coutts	Queensland
2013	Cate Campbell	Queensland
2014	Cate Campbell	Queensland
2015	Bronte Campbell; Emily Seebohm	Queensland; South Australia
2016	Kyle Chalmers	South Australia
2017	Emily Seebohm	South Australia
2018	Cate Campbell	Queensland
2019	Ariarne Titmus	Tasmania
2021	Emma McKeon	New South Wales
2022	Mollie O'Callaghan	Queensland
2023	Mollie O'Callaghan	Queensland
2024	Kaylee McKeown	Queensland
2025	Kaylee McKeown	Queensland

== Stakeholders and affiliations ==
Swimming Australia's key stakeholders includes:

- Swimming New South Wales
- Swimming Victoria
- Swimming Queensland
- Swimming South Australia
- Swimming Western Australia
- Swimming Tasmania
- Swimming Northern Territory
- Swimming ACT
- Australian Swimming Coaches and Teachers Association (ASCTA)
- Australian Swimmers Association

Swimming Australia is affiliated to the following bodies:

- The Fédération Internationale de Natation (FINA)
- The Australian Olympic Committee (AOC)
- The Australian Commonwealth Games Association (ACGA)
- The Australian Paralympic Committee (APC)
- Oceania Swimming Association
- Australian Water Safety Council

Whilst the following organisations are affiliated with Swimming Australia:

- Australian Waterpolo Association Inc
- Australian Diving Association Inc
- Australian Synchronised Swimming
- AUSSI Masters Swimming in Australia

Swimming Australia is also a foundation member of AUSTSWIM and is involved in the development of an Australian Water Safety Organisation.

== Sexual abuse allegations ==
In July 2014 the Royal Commission into Institutional Responses to Child Sexual Abuse, a Royal Commission of inquiry initiated in 2013 by the Australian Government and supported by all of its state governments, began an investigation into the responses of the Offices of the Directors of Public Prosecutions in Queensland and New South Wales to determine whether to prosecute allegations of child sexual assault; the response of Scone Swimming Club to the convictions of Stephen John Roser for indecent assault and for committing acts of indecency against a child; and related matters. Six former students, a number of swimming executives, government officials, Margaret Cunneen SC, Anthony Moynihan QC, Nicholas Cowdery QC, Lloyd Babb SC, The Honourable Justice Leanne Clare SC and Paul Rutledge gave evidence or made statements before the Royal Commission. The Royal Commission heard from women who alleged they had been abused as children and that despite informing officials, the alleged perpetrators did not face criminal trial on the basis of recommendations provided by government prosecutors in both New South Wales and Queensland. In April 2015 Swimming Australia president John Bertrand issued an apology to former swim students who were victims of sexual abuse.

Allegations against various swimming coaches were reported as first aired in the media up to ten years earlier; and new cases were alleged following the Royal Commission hearings.

== See also ==
- Diving Australia
- Swim Kids
- Swimming ACT
