= Norrie May-Welby =

Scottish-Australian transgender person

Norrie
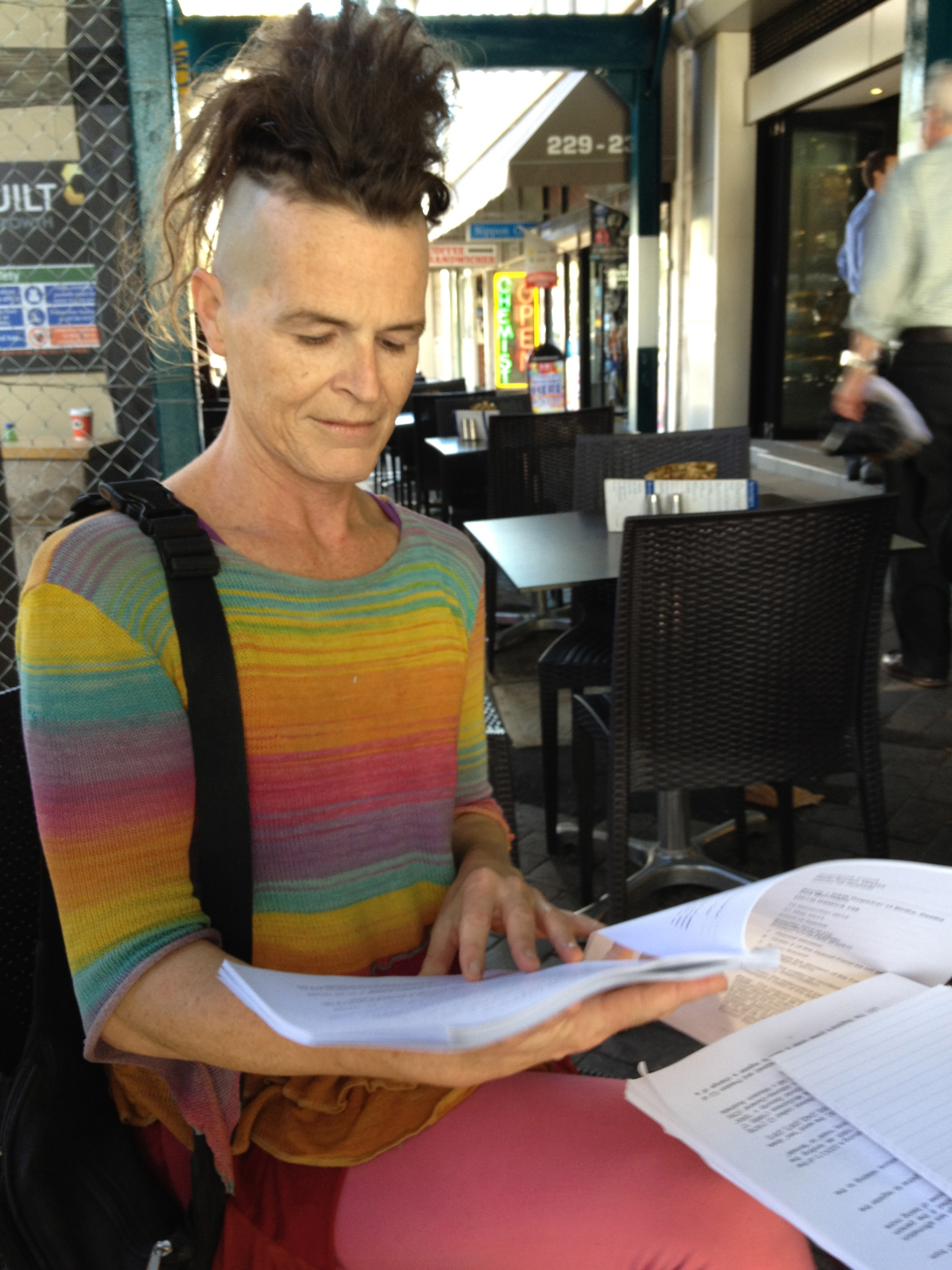
- Born: Paisley, Renfrewshire, Scotland
- Other names: Norrie May-Welby, stylized as norrie mAy-Welby
- Occupations: Social activist; political cartoonist
- Known for: Legal action to recognise non-specific gender

Norrie, also known by the pseudonym Norrie May-Welby, (Note: Stylised as norrie mAy-Welby) is a Scottish-Australian transgender person who pursued the legal status of being neither a man nor a woman, between 2010 and 2014. The High Court of Australia ruled in April 2014 that it was in the power of the NSW Registry of Births, Deaths and Marriages to record in the register that the sex of Norrie was "non-specific".

== Life ==
Norrie was born in Paisley, Renfrewshire, Scotland. Norrie moved to Perth, Western Australia at the age of seven. Norrie underwent sex reassignment surgery on 3 April 1989, but later found that being a woman was not what they felt like either. Norrie describes their gender as androgynous.

Norrie moved to Sydney, New South Wales in the early 1990s, after a highly publicised court case in Perth. Doctors stated in January 2010 that Norrie was a neuter, with a self-image that was neither male nor female, and no sex organs. Norrie publicly uses gender-neutral third-person pronouns, such as singular they, but does not object to being referred to by feminine pronouns "as long as there are no imposed assumptions about reproductive biology coming along with them".

In 2019, Norrie published the autobiographical book Ultrasex (Beyond Division).

=== NSW Registrar of Births, Deaths and Marriages v Norrie ===
The New South Wales Government Registry of Births, Deaths and Marriages initially recognized Norrie as being neither male nor female, with a registered details certificate stating "not specified" in 2010. However, the Registry rescinded its decision in a formal letter of cancellation on 17 March 2010. In response, Norrie filed a complaint with the Australian Human Rights Commission and to the Court of Appeal. The Court of Appeal ruled in favour of Norrie, but the Registrar appealed to the High Court. In April 2014, the High Court ruled that it was within the Registrar's power to record in the register that the sex of Norrie was "not specific". The Court found that sex affirmation "surgery did not resolve her [sic] sexual ambiguity". Regarding the four-year battle, Norrie stated, "It was swings and roundabouts, but I'm on Wikipedia now".

=== Australian Marriage Act ===
Norrie was featured on the first episode of Hatch, Match & Dispatch, where Norrie was seeking to obtain a marriage licence. Norrie could not do so due to being legally genderless, and the Australian marriage law at the time stated that marriage was defined as being between a man and a woman. Norrie planned to protest this to the UN. Though Norrie declined to do so, Norrie was told that they would be able to get married if they agreed to change their legal gender to "female".

== See also ==
- Third gender in Australia
