= Janet King (TV series) =

Australian TV series

- Genre: Legal drama Political thriller
- Written by: Greg Haddrick; Jane Allen; Kris Mrksa; Shaun Grant; Stuart Page; Niki Aken; Felicity Packard
- Directed by: Grant Brown; Peter Andrikidis; Ian Watson
- Starring: Marta Dusseldorp
- Country of origin: Australia
- Original language: English
- No. of series: 3
- No. of episodes: 24

Production
- Executive producers: Des Monaghan; Greg Haddrick
- Producers: Karl Zwicky; Jane Allen; Lisa Scott
- Production location: Australia
- Editors: Antonio Mestres (4 episodes); Nicole LaMacchia (2 episodes)
- Running time: 57 minutes
- Production company: Screentime

Original release
- Network: ABC1
- Release: 27 February 2014 – 13 July 2017

Related
- Crownies

Janet King is an Australian television drama program which began airing on ABC1 from 27 February 2014. It was created as a spin-off from the 2011 legal drama Crownies. It follows the story of Senior Crown Prosecutor Janet King (Marta Dusseldorp), tracking her journey in Series 1 in the Department of Public Prosecutions to a Royal Commission into Serious Firearm Crime in Series 2 to the National Crime Commission in Series 3.

Various cast members who appeared alongside Dusseldorp in Crownies also appeared in Janet King. A number of new characters were also created. The show was commissioned for an eight part series and filming began in 2013. A second series aired from March 2016, and a third began in May 2017.

== Production ==
=== Conception ===
Shortly before the final episode of the ABC1 legal drama Crownies was broadcast in November 2011, David Knox from TV Tonight reported that the series could continue in the form of a spin-off. The drama had suffered from modest ratings and mixed critical reviews during its 22-part run. ABC1 controller, Brendan Dahill explained "Crownies won't be coming back as Crownies. But we are talking to (producers) Screentime about a spin-off. There are lots of things I love about Crownies and lots of things that were done brilliantly, and I'm really proud of Crownies. I'm genuinely surprised it didn't engage a bigger audience than it did. Genuinely surprised. But I don't want to throw the baby out with the bathwater. There are plenty of brilliant things in it and we're talking to Screentime at the moment."

Dahill stated that the spin-off would not be season two of Crownies and that it would take the characters in different directions. He told Knox that there were certain elements of Crownies that worked well and he did not want to lose them because of poor ratings. He continued "So what Screentime have come up with is a really great compromise that allows us to keep the best bits, and learn and move on." Knox added that a spin-off is rare in Australian television drama, but not unprecedented. On 20 August 2012, ABC TV confirmed that it had commissioned the Crownies spin-off, Janet King. The series was billed as an 8-part legal and political thriller. Janet King was produced by Karl Zwicky, Jane Allen and Lisa Scott, with Hilary Bonney acting as story consultant. Greg Haddrick, Jane Allen, Kris Mrksa, and Shaun Grant wrote the series.

Dahill said he was excited about Janet King and the fresh new direction it would take. Carole Sklan, ABC's Head of Fiction, commented "Screentime has developed an exciting drama series about the fabulous character, Janet King. The series looks at the dilemmas of a contemporary woman who returns to work after a year's maternity leave and is flung into a shocking prosecution that involves layers of intrigue played out at the highest levels of power. Janet King's case leads her through some astounding twists and revelations that impact on her life on every level." Screentime's Des Monaghan said that it had become clear to Screentime and the ABC that viewers had developed "a great deal" of affection for the character of Janet King and the cast of Crownies, so he was "delighted" that there would be a chance to build on that.

On 30 June 2015, it was announced that ABC had renewed Janet King for a second eight-part series. At the ASTRA Conference in September 2016, Dusseldorp confirmed four scripts for the third series had been written. The third series began airing from 25 May 2017, replacing Seven Types of Ambiguity. It focuses on organised crime in the sporting world, with Janet heading up a National Crime Commission investigation. Her former colleague Richard Stirling (Hamish Michael) is now a barrister for some of the athletes involved, while Owen Mitchell (Damian Walshe-Howling) has become the head of the DPP.

=== Casting ===
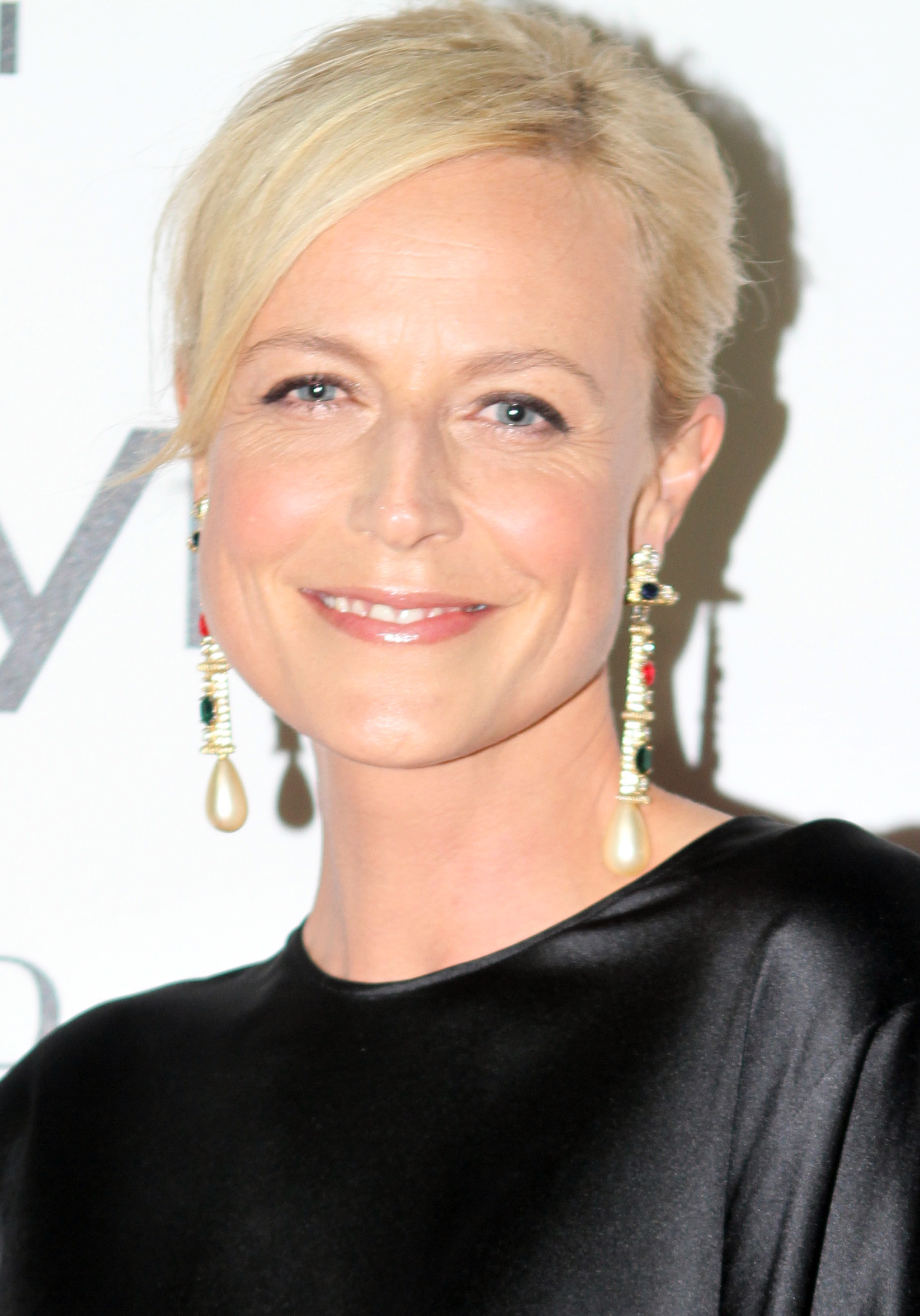
Marta Dusseldorp plays the titular character.

Anthony Soegito from If Magazine revealed that Marta Dusseldorp would return as Janet King, while many of the characters that became established on Crownies would also make appearances. These included; Hamish Michael (Richard Stirling), Ella Scott Lynch (Erin O'Shaughnessy), Andrea Demetriades (Lina Badir), Peter Kowitz (Tony Gillies), Christopher Morris (Andy Campbell), Indiana Evans (Tatum Novak), Jeanette Cronin (Tracey Samuels), Aimee Pedersen (Ashleigh Larsson) and Lewis Fitz-Gerald (David Sinclair). Knox revealed that Vince Colosimo had been cast as Chief Superintendent Jack Rizzoli, while Damian Walshe-Howling was cast as Owen Mitchell, a rising star prosecutor. John Howard, Sonia Todd, Jessica Napier, Deborah Kennedy and Tiriel Mora also have roles in the series. Todd Lasance and Daniel Lissing did not reprise their respective roles as Ben McMahon and Conrad De Groot.

Joining Dusseldorp as title character Janet King for series 2 include former Crownies originals; Hamish Michael (Richard Stirling), Andrea Demetriades (Lina Badir), Christopher Morris (Andy Campbell) and Peter Kowitz (Tony Gillies), as well as, Janet King season one cast members, Damian Walshe-Howling (Owen Mitchell) and Terry Serio (Terry Renner). New faces include Leah Purcell, Philip Quast, Anita Hegh, Aaron Jeffery, Genevieve Hegney, Nicholas Hope and Ewen Leslie.

Dusseldorp, Michael, Demetriades, Morris, Kowitz, Walshe-Howling, Hegh all returned for the third series. Joining them was Don Hany, Robert Mammone, Susie Porter, Andrew Ryan, Huw Higginson, Steve Le Marquand, Arka Das, Adam Demos, Geraldine Viswanathan and Zoe Terakes. John Bach was cast as Janet's estranged father Graham King. Todd Lasance reprised his Crownies role of Ben McMahon.

=== Filming ===
The series went into production in early 2013. Grant Brown, Peter Andrikidis, and Ian Watson were hired to direct the episodes. Filming finished by June 2013. It began broadcasting on 27 February 2014. Filming on the second series commenced in October 2015 for 11 weeks. The series was mostly shot in Bankstown, and locations included the former library, the Compass Centre, and Saigon Place. The third series went into production during the week commencing 7 November 2016.

== Cast ==
=== Main / regular ===
- Marta Dusseldorp as Janet King
- Damian Walshe-Howling as Owen Mitchell
- Hamish Michael as Richard Stirling
- Andrea Demetriades as Lina Badir
- Peter Kowitz as Tony Gillies SC
- Christopher Morris as Andy Campbell (23 episodes)
- Anita Hegh as Sergeant Bianca Grieve (16 episodes)

=== Recurring ===
- Aaron Jeffery as Simon Hamilton (3 episodes)
- Adam Demos as Nate Baldwin (7 episodes)
- Aimee Pedersen as Ashleigh Larsson (9 episodes)
- Akos Armont as Drew Blakely (8 episodes)
- Andrew Ryan as Flynn Pearce (8 episodes)
- Andrew McFarlane as Keith Nelson (3 episodes)
- Benita Collings as Robyn King (4 episodes)
- Darren Gilshenan as Alex Moreno (4 episodes)
- Deborah Kennedy as Dianne Vasilich (4 episodes)
- Don Hany as Clay Nelson (2 episodes)
- Ella Scott Lynch as Erin O'Shaughnessy (8 episodes)
- Ewen Leslie as Patrick Boccaro (5 episodes)
- Gary Sweet as Roger Embry (4 episodes)
- Geraldine Viswanathan as Bonnie Mahesh (8 episodes)
- Harriet Dyer as Maya Blakely (8 episodes)
- Heather Mitchell as Justice Victoria Walker (4 episodes)
- Huw Higginson as Wayne Page (6 episodes)
- Indiana Evans as Tatum Novak (4 episodes)
- Jeanette Cronin as Tracey Samuels (8 episodes)
- Jessica Napier as Caroline Martin (3 episodes)
- John Bach as Graham King (5 episodes)
- John Howard as Steven Blakely (2 episodes)
- Josef Ber as Robbie Carter (5 episodes)
- Leah Purcell as Heather O'Connor (8 episodes)
- Leeanna Walsman as Peta Vickers (season 2, 7 episodes)
- Genevieve Hegney as Deborah Larsson (6 episodes)
- Lewis Fitz-Gerald as David Sinclair QC (4 episodes)
- Marcus Graham as Danny Novak (2 episodes)
- Melissa Bonne as Keisha Gibson (7 episodes)
- Milly Alcock as Cindi Jackson (3 episodes)
- Mitchell Butel as Tim Dolan (2 episodes)
- Nicholas Hope as Justice Felton (2 episodes)
- Noel Hodda as Magistrate Hansford (2 episodes)
- Peter Mochrie as Geoff Hadley (4 episodes)
- Philip Quast as Lincoln Priest (5 episodes)
- Rahel Romahn as Sam Nobakht (6 episodes)
- Robert Mammone as Darren Faulkes (4 episodes)
- Sonia Todd as Gail Jones (5 episodes)
- Steve Le Marquand as Wes Foster (6 episodes)
- Susie Porter as Maxine Reynolds (6 episodes)
- Terry Serio as Terry Renner (8 episodes)
- Tiriel Mora as Judge Granville Renmark (4 episodes)
- Vince Colosimo as Chief Superintendent Jack Rizzoli (8 episodes)
- Zoe Carides as Gillian Warden (3 episodes)
- Zoe Terakes as Pearl Perati (7 episodes)

=== Guests ===
- Aaron Glenane as Collard (1 episode)
- Andy Anderson as Anthony Schaeffer
- Arka Das as Ravi Hasan (1 episode)
- Arky Michael as George Healy (2 episodes)
- Doris Younane as Magistrate Brenner (1 episode)
- Jamie Meyer-Williams as Oliver Pittman (1 episode)
- John Adam as Simon Nixon (1 episode)
- Josephine Mitchell as Dr Wyburn (1 episode)
- Marshall Napier as Magistrate Schaeffer (1 episode)
- Nicholas Hope as Justice Felton (2 episodes)
- Raelee Hill as Maureen (1 episode)
- Sarah Chadwick as Justice Stanton (1 episode)
- Todd Lasance as Ben McMahon (1 episode)

== Episodes ==
=== Series overview ===
Series	Episodes	Originally released	
Series	Episodes	First released	Last released
1	8	27 February 2014	17 April 2014
2	8	24 March 2016	12 May 2016
3	8	25 May 2017	13 July 2017

=== Series 1 (2014) ===
No.	Title	Directed by	Written by	Original release date	AUS viewers (millions)
1	"A Song of Experience"	Grant Brown	Greg Haddrick	27 February 2014	0.824
Senior Prosecutor Janet King returns to the Department of Public Prosecutions following maternity leave. She fails to get suspected sexual predator Alex Moreno convicted, so she throws herself into a case involving high ranking police officer, Steven Blakely, who has been charged with the assisted suicide of his wife.
2	"Every Contact Leaves a Trace"	Grant Brown	Jane Allen	6 March 2014	0.754
Janet feels guilty when Blakely disappears and may have committed suicide. However, Detective Campbell believes that Blakely was murdered by Dianne Vasilich, a woman who was angry with Blakely for covering up her daughter's murder. Meanwhile, Erin and Owen become involved with a bikie murder that ends with their witness being killed in a drive-by shooting.
3	"Natural Justice"	Grant Brown	Kris Mrksa	13 March 2014	0.770
Owen takes on the case of Zabina's murder and the police soon identify the two bikies responsible, Franzen and Collard. Janet goes for a murder conviction when Blakely's blood is found on Dianne's coat but she claims she merely found him injured. Franzen offers to testify that Dianne tried to pay him to beat information out of Blakely, in return for immunity from prosecution. Collard's confession is ruled inadmissible and Erin's testimony is torn to shreds. Dianne and her son are found guilty but then Blakely's body is found far away from where they supposedly dumped it.
4	"The Third Man"	Peter Andrikidis	Jane Allen and Shaun Grant	20 March 2014	0.740
The case against Dianne and her son will collapse unless the police produce an accomplice who buried Blakely's body. Andy finds Blakely argued with Danny Novak shortly before he died and was reinvestigating the murder of Dianne's daughter; Tatum gives her father a false alibi. Rizzoli points Andy towards Cranford, who claims to have buried Blakely's body for the Vasilichs, but Janet exposes him as a liar in court. Lina becomes obsessed with convicting Tim Clarke and mistakes his daughter for one of his victims. Novak tells Janet that Blakely's murder is connected to the Moreno case.
5	"Lurking Doubt"	Peter Andrikidis	Jane Allen	27 March 2014	0.772
Janet recognises Moreno's daughter Ruby in one of the photos from Clarke's computer and Lina discovers it was taken in a house owned by Blakely. Gail Jones orders Tony to oversee Dianne's appeal but the judges overturn the conviction with little discussion. Andy is taken off the case when he has to cover Rizzoli's leave, while Janet is harassed by the press when she is accused of having an affair with Erin, who has just been promoted. Ash and the children are taken into protective custody when a bomb goes off in Janet's empty car.
6	"Overtime"	Peter Andrikidis	Kris Mrksa	3 April 2014	0.831
Janet is convinced Moreno was involved in the bombing but no evidence can be found. Blakely's daughter Maya reveals she was abused as a child by Keith Nelson, a family friend; Owen and Lina get him committed to trial but Maya is reluctant to give evidence. Janet and Richard investigate Judge Renmark, who acquitted Moreno and is currently investigating Janet and Erin; Rizzoli suspects he was in the pay of organised crime.
7	"An Achilles Heel"	Ian Watson	Shaun Grant and Greg Haddrick	10 April 2014	0.820
Renmark is found dead after a fall from a multi-story car park, and a USB stick full of child pornography, similar to one Nelson had, is found in his house. Lina tells Andy about her apparent infertility. Richard tells Andy and Janet that Owen knew about Richard's investigation into the history of Renmark's judgements, and Tony discovers that he spread the story about Janet and Erin to the press. Tony convinces Maya to testify but Owen fails to cut a deal with David Sinclair. Drew claims in court that it was Blakely who abused them.
8	"The Greatest Good"	Ian Watson	Jane Allen	17 April 2014	0.855
Drew is exposed as Blakely's murderer, Danny Novak is arrested for the murder of Orianna Vasilich and Nelson is found guilty. Moreno confesses to taking the photographs and offers information in exchange for Ruby's name being left out of it. Drew states that Blakely was behind the ring and Renmark behind the car bomb. However, Janet realises Rizzoli was behind both, as well as Renmark's murder: He was using the ring to control high ranking officials and ensure convictions. When Janet refuses to keep quiet, he commits suicide. Gail increases the DPP's budget in return for keeping quiet about his involvement and the other members of the ring are arrested.

=== Series 2 (2016) ===
No. overall	No. in series	Title	Directed by	Written by	Original release date	AUS viewers (millions)
9	1	"The Invisible Wound"	Peter Andrikidis	Greg Haddrick	24 March 2016	0.627
The murder of Todd Wilson is the latest in over a dozen committed with illegal handguns in the last 15 months and Attorney-General Lincoln Priest assigns Janet to the Royal Commission into Serious Firearm Crime to investigate the crimes; Owen, Richard, Lina and Andy are assigned to assist her. Janet is also dealing with Ash's murder by a still unknown gunman two years previous and running an inquest into the suicide of Corporal Allman, a soldier with PTSD. The police are interested in George Healy, a small-time drug user who was involved in a car crash near Todd's murder, and Janet's new assistant Heather O'Connor helps Andy arrest him. Richard visits Keisha Gibson, who was with Todd when he was killed, and sees a bag of blood-stained money in her room; Janet and the others suspect she is going to meet someone to split it and decide to keep her under surveillance. Janet is visiting Todd's widow Elaheh and her family to give her an expensive bracelet he bought her when someone shoots through the window.
10	2	"Here and Now"	Peter Andrikidis	Stuart Page	31 March 2016	0.613
The Commission feel that the Nabekhts know more about the shooting than they are letting on. Susie, who is married to Elaheh's brother Amil, turns out to be the sister of Allman's friend Karen. Keisha contacts Richard for help and makes a statement about the money. Janet has personal trouble with Ash's sister Deborah, who has been unable to conceive and wishes to use an embryo of Ash's that was never used. CCTV footage shows that Todd stole something from Boccaro's car but when Janet and Owen talk to him he admits it. Ballistics show that the gun used in the attack on the Nabekht house was the same one used in Ash's murder. George offers to give information on the guns in exchange for immunity and a new protection, but when Andy and Heather go to see him they find he has been hanged.
11	3	"In Plain Sight"	Ian Watson	Niki Aken	7 April 2016	0.608
Janet asks Andy and Owen to have Bianca carry out an undercover operation to get information from Felix Murphy, who was shot with the same gun as Ash. Tony tells Janet that DNA evidence suggests Ash and George were killed by the same person and Bianca suggests advanced tests could get a description of the killer. Janet asks Richard to help her with her case against Deborah. Lina and Heather convince Elaheh to make an appeal to the public. Richard finds out that Major Hamilton bought a car similar to the one Todd tried to steal shortly before Todd was killed.
12	4	"The Smoking Gun"	Ian Watson	Niki Aken	14 April 2016	0.613
Karen admits to Janet and Owen that Todd stole Hamilton's credit card details, and Richard and Lina learn Todd bought and sold the Ferrari using Hamilton's identity. Janet asks Tim to support her position but instead he puts in a request that the embryo be destroyed. Richard nearly blows Bianca's cover when he unknowingly takes Keisha on a date to the bar where she is meeting Felix. Owen learns Hamilton is importing a crate and he, Janet, Andy and Richard raid it to find fridges stuffed with handguns.
13	5	"Apprehended Violence"	Grant Brown	Greg Haddrick	21 April 2016	0.595
Richard supervises the federal police disarming and repacking the guns, and realises the contact number is not Hamilton but Amil. However, when he receives notification of the shipment he makes no move to collect it. Heather and Lina realise Todd was killed with one of the homemade, one-use-only guns Hamilton had the plans of. They visit a council meeting and witness an altercation between Boccaro and Bao Long, who is opening a leisure centre-cum-casino. Heather visits Roger Embry of the State Corruption Commission to see if anyone tipped off the Nobakhts. Janet gets Richard to take Keisha to PTSD counselling, where she recalls hearing another witness to the murder. A judge awards Janet ownership of the embryo. Janet's iPad is stolen, with Heather's security codes used to enter the building. The corruption officers start investigating Janet, Bianca, Richard and Lina. Lincoln pressures Janet and Owen to deliver an interim report and Bianca has Andy poses as her ex so Felix will send the person who shot him to give her a gun. However, the person that turns up is Brett, who recognises Andy as a police officer and fires at him.
14	6	"The Thaw"	Grant Brown	Felicity Packard	28 April 2016	0.628
Bianca kills Brett, saving Andy but preventing them getting any information from him. More guns are found at Brett's house and DNA evidence shows he was one of the people that killed George but not the one that killed Ash. The Nobakhts are caught trying to take 30,000 US dollars to Iran and explain they are trying to buy Sam exemption from military service; Brett paid them to put their details on the shipping order and was the one who shot up their house. Lina tells Andy she is pregnant, while Richard spends the night with Keisha. Embry shows Janet evidence that she helped Richard get Keisha off a drug possession charge; Janet suspects that Deborah, who is appealing the ruling, tipped him off. Heather learns Hamilton had a liaison with Robbie Carter. Bianca gets Felix witness protection and he leaves behind an anagram indicating Brett was working for Bao Long.
15	7	"The Heart of It"	Peter Andrikidis	Stuart Page and Greg Haddick	5 May 2016	0.663
Janet interviews Hamilton and Robbie and realises Jane Carter killed Todd with a plastic gun that Hamilton gave Robbie, believing he was Hamilton. Lincoln encourages Janet to resign prior to the SCC investigation. Boccaro, who has used a damaging press report to convince Lincoln to give him the leisure centre contract, tells Owen and Heather that Brett and Todd may have sold what they stole from his car to Bao Long. The Commission interview Lang but fail to get a DNA sample. Janet and Bianca have sex. Deborah's appeal is rejected and she admits she spoke to the SCC. Peta gives Janet her iPad, from which photos of Ash have been deleted. Keisha asks Richard to go overseas with her; instead, he tells Janet that once the Commission is over he will be leaving the DPP to do his bar exams. Janet asks Owen to help her and Bianca with a trap, then announces she is suspending the Commission.
16	8	"The Long Goodbye"	Peter Andrikidis	Greg Haddrick and Felicity Packard	12 May 2016	0.673
Janet and Owen use a micro-camera to get footage of Boccaro selling the handguns to a biker gang. Tony convinces Embry to drop the SCC investigation and Boccaro is arrested. Lincoln is forced to resign when it is revealed Boccaro paid him millions of dollars, ostensibly for a tea set but more likely a bribe for the land deal. Boccaro indicates that he loaned the gun to Ashley's killer, who is now going to kill Janet. Janet and Bianca learn the killer was someone genetically male but outwardly female and suspect Heather, whose nephew Janet sent to jail on an apparently false rape charge. Richard represents Heather at her bail hearing. DNA morphology reveals the culprit to be Peta, whose husband committed suicide after Janet refused to prosecute a historic child abuse charge. Peta traps Janet's children at the bottom of a lift shaft but Bianca stops her sending the lift down by shooting her in the leg. Janet visits a pregnant Deborah in hospital, implying she gave her the embryo after all.

=== Series 3 (2017) ===
No. overall	No. in series	Title	Directed by	Written by	Original release date	AUS viewers (millions)
17	1	"Playing Advantage"	Peter Andrikidis	Greg Haddrick	25 May 2017	0.503
Janet, Tony and Bianca are working for the National Crime Commission investigating bet fixing in sports, with Owen having taken over the DPP. Janet focuses on the case of Oliver Pittman, a young cricketer who committed suicide after being accused of fixing a Twenty20 match for the Firecrackers. Sports agent Maxine Reynolds has hired Richard to represent several of her clients, including Firecrackers captain Clay Nelson, and sets him up to almost take a bribe from developer Darren Faulkes. Janet is also suspicious of Ravi Hasan, whose home was torched just after the match. She asks Richard to convince Clay to tell the commission the truth. Instead, Clay deliberately steps in front of a bus outside the commission.
18	2	"Blindsided"	Peter Andrikidis	Felicity Packard	1 June 2017	0.475
The commission speak to Maxine who suggests they talk to Northern Devils' sponsor, Pax Car Rentals, whose chairman turns out to be Janet's estranged father Graham. Nate Baldwin accidentally kills Tyler during a brawl after Tyler sees the video of his teammates assaulting Pearl and is charged with manslaughter. The autopsy shows that Tyler was taking an unknown performance enhancing drug which may have caused excessive bleeding. Andy tells Janet that a pack of morphine tablets found at Clay's home was stolen from a hospital. Janet realises the family's computer was recording and they hear someone telling Clay that if he doesn't commit suicide and make it look like an accident they will kill Reed.
19	3	"Levelling the Playing Field"	Grant Brown	Niki Aken	8 June 2017	0.425
Tony discovers that Graham called the man who visited Clay and orders Janet to stay out of interviews. Graham also has links to Wazim Jandaphur, whose house Razim was staying in at the time of the arson. Lina gets Nate committed to trial and he rejects Richard's attempt to get him to plead guilty to a lesser charge. Both Janet and Richard go looking for Pearl, who has run away from home and is staying with Flynn from Continuum. Wayne discovers Eddie Cooke and Shannon Hinksman are selling steroids. It transpires that Graham and Darren offered Nate extra payments to sign for the Devils, which Shannon picks up but which are delivered by the man who visited Clay, who was also behind the arson.
20	4	"Running Out the Clock"	Grant Brown	Alexa Wyatt	15 June 2017	0.518
Graham makes a statement to the press denying knowledge of the salary cap. Owen hires Ben McMahon to prosecute Nate's trial. Janet offers Richard the drug in exchange for testimony from Nate, prompting Maxine to try and get a sample herself. She goes to Eddie but he no longer has any; however, Flynn has a bottle that he offers to sell to Maxine. Janet admonishes Bonnie for ignoring Maxine's meeting with Flynn. She has Zoe approach Eddie for help and he gets the bottle from Flynn but analysis shows it only contains tap water. Eddie's car is run off the road. Without the drug as evidence of a contributing factor, Nate is found guilty of manslaughter. Pearl has stolen the real bottle, intended to sell it, but Cindi drinks some of it and collapses.
21	5	"Game Changer"	Peter Andrikidis	Alexa Wyatt	22 June 2017	0.462
Janet and Tony are suspicious of Maxine and Janet deduces that Nate, Eddie or Flynn could give evidence against her, aiming to put pressure on them. Janet gets the bottle from Pearl and it is found to be THX-5, a blood thinner not authorised for human consumption, which has dangerous side effects for a minority of people like Tyler and Cindi. Richard helps Lucy sort out her finances and they sleep together, before Janet gives him the evidence that could free Nate. Janet uses Flynn's role in Tyler's death to convince Pearl to report him for sex with a minor, then sets her up in an apartment. Janet asks Bianca to move in with her and the twins. Mitchell Douglas turns out to be the one who ran Eddie off the road. On learning Maxine was in contact with Clay's visitor, Janet and the police go to her house to find it ransacked and empty.
22	6	"Hard Ball"	Peter Andrikidis	Felicity Packard	29 June 2017	0.477
Darren tells the commission that Maxine gave the signal to Oliver about the spot betting. Bianca and Wayne catch her trying to leave the country and she says Darren is behind everything but refuses to testify. Janet insists Lina proceeds with the case against Flynn despite her misgivings but he is found not guilty after his defence points out Pearl contacted him with an app for over-18s. Janet does however discover Flynn was the one who stole the morphine tablets given to Clay. Nate is released on appeal. Richard confides in Lina about his guilt over not helping Pearl. Graham, who is being investigated for fraud, gives evidence to the commission and is then beaten by masked men in front of Janet. The phone used by Clay's visitor is found in the possession of Lionel Cartwright, who is being threatened into bringing in the ingredients for MDMA. Surveillance identifies Shannon and Clay's visitor, Wes Foster, as being involved; Foster is arrested but refuses to say anything. A recording of Richard having sex with Lucy is used to induce him to help infiltrate Darren's inner circle, unaware that Owen is already befriending him.
23	7	"White Line Fever"	Catherine Millar	Greg Haddrick	6 July 2017	0.521
Janet invites Graham, who has declared himself bankrupt, to stay with her while he recuperates. She and Tony help him prepare for his case but an attempt to talk through their history ends unsatisfactorily. Richard attends one of Darren's parties on a pretext, where Nate blames him for the breakdown of his marriage. Owen instructs Lina not to oppose Foster's bail but keeps quiet about Richard's connection to the NCC, asking Darren for advice on betting. Andy replaces Wayne at the NCC and carries out blatant surveillance of Foster but Foster gives him the slip. Darren uses Richard as an unwitting courier to deliver a case full of money that will be sent abroad labelled as foreign currency; Richard tampers with the combination lock. Foster attacks someone implied to be Richard in a public toilet.
24	8	"Little Victories"	Catherine Millar	Felicity Packard	13 July 2017	0.480
The body in the toilet turns out to be Flynn, his death made to look like an overdose. Foster is arrested after his DNA is found at the scene. Richard learns Darren's next target is Glen Farmer, a young tennis player who will be bribed to throw a set. Janet convinces him to talk Glen into it when Shannon fails and the police arrest the drug dealers Darren is working with, forcing him to rely on his laundered money to make bets so the NCC can track it. Janet gets Pearl into a sports scholarship but Bianca breaks up with her, realising she'll never be her priority. Darren and Shannon are arrested after an attempt to abduct Richard but Owen has ASIO agents shut down the NCC interrogation; Darren is needed to monitor international terrorist organisations radicalising Australian youths, with NCC only allowed to confiscate the profits from the betting scams and money laundering. Zoe dies of heart failure, probably caused by damage from taking performance-enhancing drugs. Janet has Foster make a statement about all the crimes Darren was involved in, predicting that one day his usefulness to ASIO will be over and he can be charged.

== Reception ==
Ben Neutze from Crikey said that Janet was an "audience favourite" from Crownies. He also noted that Dusseldorp's acting profile had been raised following her appearance in A Place to Call Home. He predicted that the combination would secure success for the show and ABC. Ben Pobjie, writing for The Sydney Morning Herald, praised the series for trying "to keep things varied and interesting. Most likely aware of the pitfalls of such a familiar genre, the show moves at a neat pace."

=== Accolades ===
Year	Award	Category	Recipients and nominees	Result
2014	AACTA Awards	Best Lead Actress in a Television Drama	Marta Dusseldorp	Won
2014	AACTA Awards	Best Television Drama Series	Janet King	Nominated
2015	Logie Awards	Most Outstanding Actress	Marta Dusseldorp	Nominated
2015	Logie Awards	Most Outstanding Drama Series	Janet King	Nominated
2016	AACTA Awards	Best Editing in Television	Nicole La Macchia	Nominated
2016	AACTA Awards	Best Guest or Supporting Actor in a Television Drama	Hamish Michael	Nominated
2017	Logie Awards	Most Outstanding Actress	Marta Dusseldorp	Nominated
2017	AWGIE Awards	Best Script for a Television Series or Miniseries	Greg Haddrick for "Playing Advantage"	Nominated

== Home media ==
Series 1 was released by ABC and Roadshow Entertainment on a three disc DVD (Region 4, PAL) on 18 April 2014, and released in the U.S. on 21 June 2016. Series 2 was released in the U.S. on 25 October 2016. Series 3 was released in the U.S. on 26 September 2017.

== International ==
In the United States, the series premiered on Acorn TV on 14 March 2016. The show also airs in Denmark, Finland, Iceland and Spain. Although the series has never been shown in the UK, all seasons are available to view on the STV Player, the video on demand service owned by STV, the ITV affiliate in North and Central Scotland.
