= Crownies =

2011 Australian drama TV series

- Genre: Legal drama Dramedy
- Starring: Todd Lasance; Hamish Michael; Ella Scott Lynch; Andrea Demetriades; Indiana Evans; Marta Dusseldorp
- Theme music composer: Lanie Lane
- Opening theme: What Do I Do
- Composers: Sonar Music; Antony Partos
- Country of origin: Australia
- Original language: English
- No. of seasons: 1
- No. of episodes: 22

Production
- Executive producers: Carole Sklan; Des Monaghan; Greg Haddrick; David Ogilvy
- Producers: Karl Zwicky; Jane Allen; Lisa Scott
- Production location: Sydney
- Cinematography: Bruce Young
- Editor: Marcus D'Arcy
- Running time: 55 mins approx
- Production company: Screentime

Original release
- Network: ABC1
- Release: 14 July – 1 December 2011

Related
- Janet King

Crownies is an Australian television drama series which was originally broadcast on ABC1 from 14 July until 1 December 2011. The series revolves around a group of solicitors fresh from law school, working with Crown Prosecutors, who are the public prosecutors in the legal system of New South Wales, working for the office of the Director of Public Prosecutions (DPP).

== Production ==
ABC1 ordered Crownies for a twenty-two-episode run and it was produced by Karl Zwicky. It was the first long-form drama format to be commissioned by the Australian Broadcasting Corporation since 2005's MDA. Filming began in January 2011. The location chosen for filming was Sydney, New South Wales. Many scenes were filmed in the business district Parramatta, more predominantly around the Parramatta Justice Precinct for the low financial cost and its accessibility. Alongside the Parramatta river shops, churches and streets were used for location shoots. Every twelve days a Brazilian restaurant located on Church Street would be converted into the set of "Gar's Bar", which served as the "legal hangout" for the characters. To cut costs, scenes requiring countryside settings were filmed a mere fifteen-minute drive away from Parramatta. The series finished filming in September 2011.

It is written by Greg Haddrick, Jane Allen, Kylie Needham, Tamara Asmar, Blake Ayshford, Chris Hawkshaw, Justine Gillmer, Pete McTighe, Stuart Page & Sam Miekle. It is directed by Tony Tilse, Chris Noonan, Cherie Nowlan, Grant Brown, Lynn Hegarty, Garth Maxwell and Jet Wilkinson.

On 24 January 2011, Greg Hassall from The Sydney Morning Herald announced the casting of Todd Lasance, Hamish Michael, Marta Dusseldorp and Jerome Ehlers.

== Cast ==
=== Main ===
- Todd Lasance as Ben McMahon
- Hamish Michael as Richard Stirling
- Ella Scott Lynch as Erin O'Shaughnessy
- Andrea Demetriades as Lina Badir
- Marta Dusseldorp as Janet King
- Indiana Evans as Tatum Novak
- Peter Kowitz as Tony Gillies
- Jeanette Cronin as Tracey Samuels
- Lewis Fitz-Gerald as David Sinclair QC
- Jerome Ehlers as Rhys Kowalski

=== Recurring ===
- Aimee Pedersen as Ashleigh Larsson
- Anna Lise Phillips as Sonya
- Chantelle Jamieson as Julie Rousseau
- Christopher Morris as Andy Campbell
- Daniel Lissing as Conrad De Groot
- Elias Joukhdar as Tariq Badir
- Heather Mitchell as Judge Walker
- Marcus Graham as Danny Novak
- Paul Moxey as Harry
- Petra Yared as Paula Corvini
- Ritchie Singer as The Honourable Mr Justice Rosenberg
- Toby Schmitz as Detective Dylan Thorne

=== Guests ===
- Amy Mathews as Vanessa Kenay (1 episode)
- Anya Beyersdorf as Rebecca (1 episode)
- Ben Winspear as Dr Preston (1 episode)
- Bob Baines as Dr Wally Kos (1 episode)
- Diane Craig as Carolyn Fletcher (1 episode)
- Ian Bliss as Inspector Red Bindall (1 episode)
- Fayssal Bazzi as Mustafa Al-Tikriti (1 episode)
- Lucy Bell as Ruth Steinberg (1 episode)
- Marina Finlay as Trudie (1 episode)
- Nathaniel Buzolic as Jesse Major (1 episode)
- Sarah Chadwick as Justice Stanton (1 episode)
- Tammy MacIntosh as Dr Amelia Ward (1 episode)
- Tina Bursill as Magistrate Ellen Hansby (1 episode)

== Episodes ==
No.	Title	Directed by	Written by	Original release date
1	"Episode 1"	Cherie Nowlan	Greg Haddrick	14 July 2011
2	"Episode 2"	Cherie Nowlan	Kylie Needham	14 July 2011
3	"Episode 3"	Tony Tilse	Tamara Asmar	21 July 2011
4	"Episode 4"	Tony Tilse	Greg Haddrick	28 July 2011
5	"Episode 5"	Grant Brown	Jane Allen	4 August 2011
6	"Episode 6"	Grant Brown	Blake Ayshford	11 August 2011
7	"Episode 7"	Lynn Hegarty	Justine Gillmer	18 August 2011
8	"Episode 8"	Lynn Hegarty	Tamara Asmar	25 August 2011
9	"Episode 9"	Chris Noonan	Kylie Needham	1 September 2011
10	"Episode 10"	Chris Noonan	Jane Allen & Blake Ayshford	8 September 2011
11	"Episode 11"	Garth Maxwell	Justine Gillmer	15 September 2011
12	"Episode 12"	Garth Maxwell	Peter McTighe	22 September 2011
13	"Episode 13"	Lynn Hegarty	Chris Hawkshaw	29 September 2011
14	"Episode 14"	Lynn Hegarty	Blake Ayshford	6 October 2011
15	"Episode 15"	Jet Wilkinson	Kylie Needham	13 October 2011
16	"Episode 16"	Jet Wilkinson	Tamara Asmar	20 October 2011
17	"Episode 17"	Garth Maxwell	Stuart Page	27 October 2011
18	"Episode 18"	Garth Maxwell	Justine Gillmer	3 November 2011
19	"Episode 19"	Lynn Hegarty	Sam Meikle	10 November 2011
20	"Episode 20"	Lynn Hegarty	Peter McTighe	17 November 2011
21	"Episode 21"	Jet Wilkinson	Tamara Asmar	24 November 2011
22	"Episode 22"	Jet Wilkinson	Jane Allen	1 December 2011

== Spin-off ==
Before the series finale of Crownies had broadcast, ABC1 Channel Controller Brendan Dahill revealed that he sought the creation of a spin-off and singled out Dusseldorp and Michael for their portrayals. He believed that there were many successful aspects of Crownies to build on and expressed his surprise that the show was not as popular as he had envisioned. On 20 August 2012, ABC TV confirmed that it had commissioned an "8-part legal and political thriller" titled Janet King. The spin-off went into production in early 2013 and featured various cast members from Crownies. The first episode aired on 27 February 2014.

== Home media ==
Crownies was initially released on region 4 DVD in two separate parts. The first eleven episodes were released on 6 October 2011. The remaining episodes were released on 1 December 2011. The two box-sets were later released for region 2.

Although the series has never been shown in the UK, it is available to view on the STV Player, the video on demand service owned by STV, the ITV affiliate in North and Central Scotland.

== Reception ==
=== Critical analysis ===
Doug Anderson from The Sydney Morning Herald liked the show for the cast, "fresh" writing and good relationship between character. He believed anyone with intelligence could relate to the show. He praised the character of Tatum Novak for being the modern girl and branded the rest as fairly conventional characters, with personal issues blended in with cases. But his colleague Craig Mathieson criticised the show stating "The show is struggling to find an even tone and at various times it's flirtatiously sexy, coolly cynical and blazingly emotional. The problem is that these diverse moods jarringly occur one after the other. It's somewhat messy."

=== Awards and nominations ===
Award	Date of ceremony	Category	Recipients and nominees	Result
Equity Awards	29 March 2012	Most Outstanding Performance by an Ensemble in a Drama Series	Crownies	Nominated
Logie Award	15 April 2012	Most Outstanding New Talent	Hamish Michael	Nominated
Australian Directors' Guild Awards	11 May 2012	Best Direction in a TV Drama Series	Jet Wilkinson	Nominated
