= Sally Dowling =

Australian lawyer

Sally Dowling SC is an Australian lawyer who has been Director of Public Prosecutions for New South Wales since August 2021.

== Early life and education ==
Dowling is one of three children; her mother, Stephanie Claire, worked as an English teacher and writer, and later married artist Salvatore Zofrea. Dowling attended North Sydney Girls High School but left in Year 11. She worked as a waitress and a bookie's clerk before later completing her HSC at TAFE. She graduated from the University of Sydney in 1994.

== Career ==
Dowling was admitted as a legal practitioner in 1995. She worked as an associate to Justice Hill in the Federal Court before practicing intellectual property and trade practices law as a solicitor. She was admitted as a barrister in 1997 and worked in private practice in commercial and intellectual property.

Dowling started work at the DPP in 2001 and became a Crown prosecutor since 2005. In 2004, when her children were very young, Dowling was the only part-time trial crown prosecutor in NSW, working one week on, one week off. She acknowledged that it was very difficult to work part-time as a barrister and still earn enough to cover expenses, but said that working part-time "promotes efficiency."

In 2013, Dowling was appointed senior counsel and in 2016 she was appointed deputy senior Crown prosecutor and head of the appeals unit within the NSW office of the DPP. In 2019, she was senior counsel assisting the NSW Government's Special Commission of Inquiry into the Drug ‘Ice’. In 2020, she became a barrister in private practice at Wardell Chambers.

Dowling was appointed to a ten-year term as Director of Public Prosecutions in August 2021. She is the first woman to hold the role. In July 2026, a report was released that suggested Dowling should be removed as Director of Public Prosecutions due to an alleged leak from her office. This suggestion was rebuffed by attorney-general Michael Daley. Dowling was also supported by other state and territory DPPs.

== Personal life ==
Dowling has two children.

In 2018, Salvatore Zofrea's portrait of Dowling was a finalist in the Archibald Prize.
