= Contagion (1987 film) =

- Film poster
- Directed by: Karl Zwicky
- Written by: Ken Methold
- Produced by: Leo Barretto; Ken Methold
- Starring: John Doyle; Nicola Bartlett; Ray Barrett
- Cinematography: John Stokes
- Edited by: Ray Mason
- Music by: Frank Strangio
- Release date: 1987
- Running time: 90 minutes
- Country: Australia
- Language: English
- Budget: A$750,000

Contagion is a 1987 Australian horror film directed by Karl Zwicky and starring John Doyle, Nicola Bartlett and Ray Barrett.

The film was shot around Brisbane in 35 days.

== Plot ==
Mark, a naive real estate agent, is asked by his boss to travel to Crompton for a job. Along the road, Mark sees a beautiful woman being sexually abused by crazies that live in the bush, and he stops to aid her. However, the crazies attack and abuse him instead. He makes an escape and in the forest finds his way to a nearby mansion where he is given a welcome by millionaire Roderick Bael and Cleo and Helen, two seductive girls who live with him. They introduce Mark to their lives of luxury and pleasure. Mark sleeps with both the girls, and Bael explains Mark the secret of his success, the Threefold Plan, which involves being ruthless with anyone in his way. He teaches Mark how to make millions on currency exchange markets. Mark then returns to his girlfriend Cheryl changed, demanding all their savings to invest with Bael and acting violent with her, while also killing his bosses. Concerned, Cheryl follows Mark as he returns to Bael's house only to find there is nothing there – just an old ruin. She must now confront a deranged and murderous Mark.

== Cast ==
- John Doyle as Mark
- Nicola Bartlett as Cheryl
- Ray Barrett as Bael
- Nathy Gaffney as Cleo
- Jacqueline Brennan as Trish
- Michael Simpson as Frank
- Pamela Hawkesford as Helen
- Chris Betts as Alec
