= Swimming ACT =

Logo of Swimming ACT

Swimming ACT is as district of NSW Swimming. It is the peak body of the sport of competitive swimming in the Australian Capital Territory and administers the sport on behalf of its affiliated clubs. Like all districts of NSW Swimming, its own ACT Championships; but unlike many other districts in NSW these are open to teams and competitors from outside the district.

ACT Swimming awards an annual "Presidents Trophy" at the conclusion of the summer championships. The winner is determined by the overall rankings of the clubs in the Men's, Women's, Relay and Development Championships. This has been won for the last several years by the Tuggeranong Vikings swimming club .

As members of NSW Swimming, members of clubs affiliated with ACT Swimming compete in the NSW Championships. Swimming ACT is constituted by 10 swimming clubs which are all registered with Swimming NSW and Swimming Australia, two of these clubs (Goulburn and Queanbeyan are not geographically within the ACT but are affiliated with ACT Swimming. In this regard ACT Swimming is much like ACTAFL and ACT Rugby Union in that the area covered geographically extends across state borders.

== Clubs ==
Swimming ACT's registered swimming clubs include:

- Burley Griffin Amateur Swim Club
- Canberra Amateur Swimming Club
- CRUIZ Swim Club
- Dickson Amateur Swimming Club
- Ginninderra Swimming Club
- Goulburn Amateur Swimming Club
- Tuggeranong Vikings Swim Club
- Queanbeyan Leagues Swimming Club
- Telopea Amateur Swimming Club
- Woden Swim Club
