= Hatch, Match & Dispatch =

Hatch, Match & Dispatch is an Australian factual television show narrated by Marta Dusseldorp that looks at the work of the staff from the New South Wales Registry of Births, Deaths and Marriages who are there to share in people's joy and heartache. This eight part observational documentary series began airing on the ABC in 2016.
