= Lloyd Babb =

Australian lawyer and prosecutor

Lloyd Babb SC (born 1966) is an Australian barrister and was the New South Wales Director of Public Prosecutions from his appointment on 18 July 2011 through to 17 July 2021.

In making his announcement about the appointment of Babb, Attorney General for New South Wales Greg Smith SC, who worked with Babb in the office of the DPP, said he was youthful and energetic and had a "calming effect" on those he met. Furthermore he went on to say "Babb has proven himself to be a lawyer of the highest quality, who is well versed with all aspects of criminal law".

Babb’s appointment to the role of NSW Director of Public Prosecutions was for 10 years and just before his tenure ended he gave an interview to Belinda Barker for barnews (the journal of New South Wales Bar Association) giving some insight to his role as DPP.

Lloyd assumed the position of President of the Hornsby Ku-ring-gai Spiders Basketball Association in June 2021 in a landslide victory.

== Early life and education ==
Babb was educated at Asquith Boys High School, where he served as the school captain in 1984 and in a 2010 address to a school assembly at his high school, Babb stated, "A criminal lawyer is what I always wanted to be ever since I was in the mock trial for Asquith Boys High in year 10 in 1982".

Babb attained his Bachelor of Arts and Bachelor of Laws degrees from Macquarie University in 1989, where he graduated with a LL.B. He was also awarded a Rotary International Foundation Scholarship, which enabled him to complete a Masters in Criminal Justice from the University of Illinois at Chicago. Another period of study abroad saw him as a visiting fellow at the University of Copenhagen’s Institute of Criminology between September 1992 and June 1993.

== Career ==
Babb was admitted as an Australian lawyer in 1989 and was called to the bar in the same year.

In 2000, Babb was appointed a Crown Prosecutor. In 2007, he was appointed as Senior Counsel. Babb's 10-year appointment as the Director of Public Prosecutions began on 18 July 2011, when he replaced Nicholas Cowdery, who retired after 17 years in the job.

In a media release congratulating Sally Dowling SC, Babb's replacement, Attorney General Mark Speakman said “She is very well positioned to continue the dedicated work of Lloyd Babb SC, who finished his 10-year term on 17 July 2021. NSW has been fortunate indeed to have benefited from the expertise, professionalism and integrity Babb brought to the position over the past decade.”

=== Notable successful prosecutions ===
Babb's notable successful prosecutions include the Darwiche Razzak Fahda series of murders, Robert Hughes (Hey Dad actor), Graeme Reeves (the Butcher of Bega), the constitutional challenge to the state application to outlaw the Hells Angels Motorcycle Club, and the Wendy Stott slavery case.

=== Controversy around the failure to prosecute suspects accused of the sexual assault and manslaughter of Lynette Daley ===
In his role as the New South Wales Director of Public Prosecutions (DPP), Lloyd Babb twice oversaw a decision not to prosecute Adrian Attwater and Paul Maris for the sexual assault that led to the death of indigenous woman Lynette Daley. In January 2011, Ms Daley, 33, died from serious injuries during a camping trip on the beach near Iluka, after sex acts were performed on her while she was drunk. Despite NSW police charging Attwater with manslaughter, and Maris as an accessory, the office of the NSW Director of Public Prosecutions dropped both cases before they reached the committal hearing in March 2012. State Coroner Michael Barnes found that there could be "no doubt" that Attwater had inflicted her fatal injuries; however, in November 2015, the NSW DPP declined to prosecute for a second time, sending a letter to Ms Daley's family stating that "There is not enough evidence to establish that Attwater committed the unlawful and dangerous act which led to Lynette's death." The NSW DPP resisted the coroner's recommendations to consider renewing charges against Attwater and Maris, until the intervention of Attorney General for New South Wales Gabrielle Upton in February 2016. Following the airing of an ABC Four Corners story in May 2016, Babb announced that he had "taken the unusual step of seeking advice from independent counsel," who would review the decision not to prosecute the two suspects. On 22 June 2016, NSW police confirmed that a 42-year-old man was charged with manslaughter and aggravated sexual assault, and a 46-year-old was charged with accessory after the fact to manslaughter and aggravated sexual assault. Ms Daley's stepfather, Gordon Davies said, "If it wasn't for Four Corners we would have just been swept under the [carpet]."

== Personal life ==
Babb is married with a son. His interests include basketball, golf, surfing and playing the guitar.

Legal offices
Preceded by Nicholas Cowdery	Director of Public Prosecutions; 2011 – present	Incumbent
