= Marta Dusseldorp =

Australian actress and producer (born 1973)

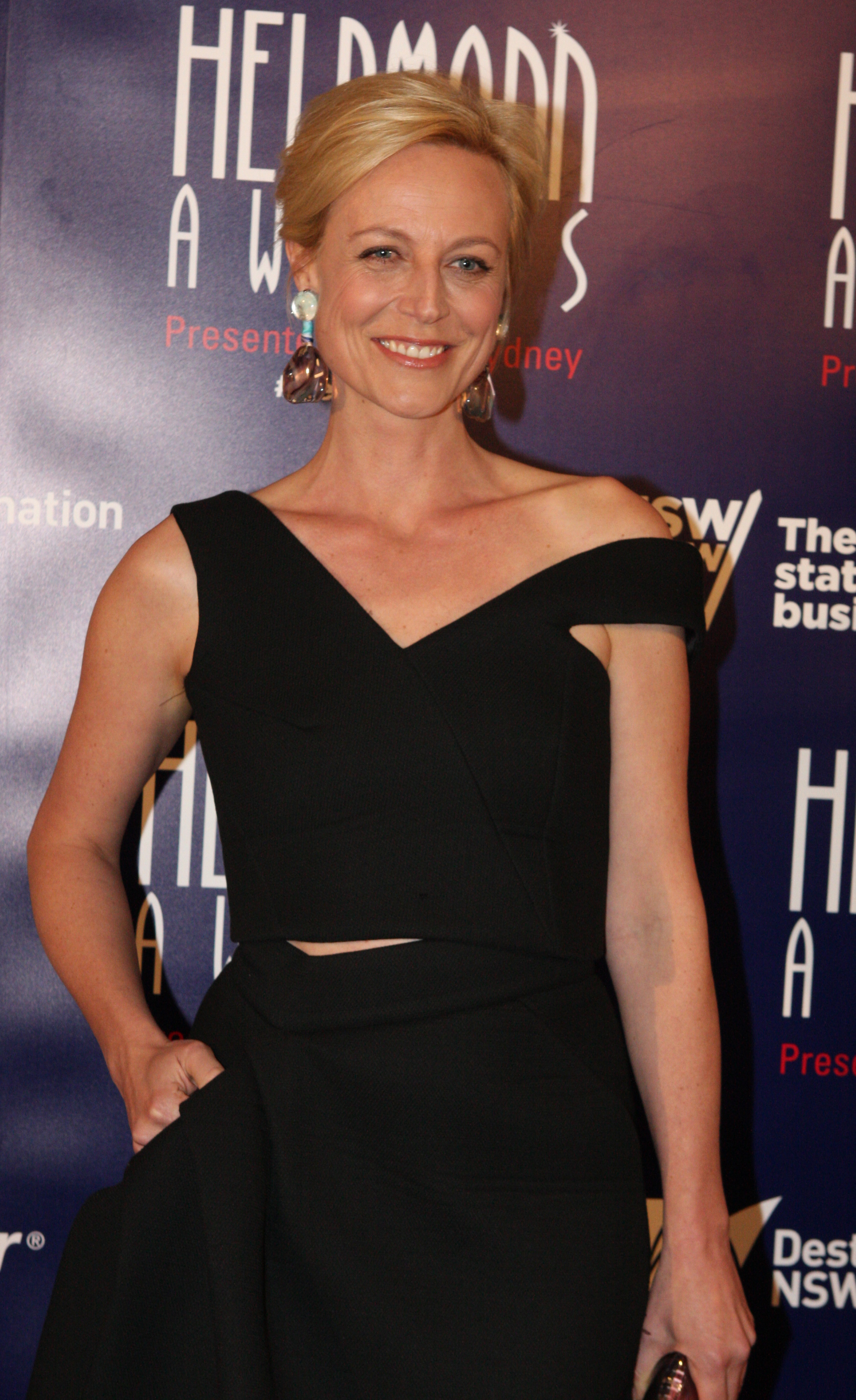
- Marta Dusseldorp in 2015
- Born: Australia
- Education: University of New South Wales; Victorian College of the Arts
- Occupation: Actress
- Years active: 1992-present
- Spouse: Ben Winspear
- Children: 2

Marta Dusseldorp is an Australian stage, film and theatre actress. Her television credits include BlackJack, Crownies (and its spin-off Janet King), Jack Irish and A Place to Call Home.

She is also a producer, as co-founder and co-owner with her husband Ben Winspear of Archipelago Productions in Hobart, Tasmania.

== Early life and education ==
Dusseldorp is the granddaughter of Dutch-born engineer Dick Dusseldorp, the founder of Lendlease. Her maternal grandfather was Sandy Robertson, a Sydney paediatrician, whose forebears were also medical doctors. Her great-grandfather was one of seven brothers in a family from Dumbarton, on the west coast of Scotland, in which eight of ten sons studied medicine at the University of Glasgow. Dusseldorp was the subject of an episode of the television genealogical documentary series Who Do You Think You Are? that first screened on SBS on 14 May 2019.

She attended Ascham School and then Geelong Grammar School, graduating in 1990, and the University of New South Wales, where she majored in theatre and film for two years. She then went on to study at the Victorian College of the Arts in Melbourne.

== Career ==
=== Stage ===
Dusseldorp started her career on the stage, performing in productions of The Lost Echo, The War of the Roses (Shakespeare), and The Bourgeois Gentleman. She has worked with Sydney Theatre Company, Belvoir, Griffin, The Ensemble, Bell Shakespeare, and Melbourne Theatre Company.

She returned to the stage in 2016 in the premiere of Benedict Andrews' play Gloria with the Griffin Theatre Company. In November 2017, Dusseldorp and her husband Ben Winspear played the couple in Joanna Murray-Smith's stage adaptation of Scenes from a Marriage for the Queensland Theatre Company.

In 2020, Dusseldorp played the role of Mum in Angus Cerini's The Bleeding Tree at Hobart's Theatre Royal, directed by Ben Winspear.

In 2021, Dusseldorp and Essie Davis played sisters as Solange and Claire, with Stephanie Jack as Mistress, in The Maids by Jean Genet as translated by Martin Crimp. It was directed by Ben Winspear and performed at The Playhouse Theatre in Hobart, opening on 30 October 2021.

In a new production of Euripides’ timeless play Women of Troy, Dusseldorp played Andromache, Wife of Hector in March 2023. It was staged at Tasmania's Ten Days on the Island arts festival, at Hobart's Theatre Royal, directed by Ben Winspear. The production, by Dusseldorp and Winspear's company Archipelago Productions, was based on Tom Wright’s adaptation. The production included an original score by composer Katie Noonan, who set to music poems by Kurdish-Iranian journalist Behrouz Boochani performed by a community chorus of women and children.

=== Television and Film ===
Dusseldorp played Sam Lawson in the telemovie series BlackJack (2003–2007). In 2011 she played the character of Janet King in the ABC1 drama series Crownies, her breakout role, which she regarded as "a gift". She reprised the role in the 2014 spin-off Janet King. She played Linda Hillier opposite Guy Pearce in all of the Jack Irish TV series, which ran from 2012 to 2021.

She played Sarah Adams in the series A Place to Call Home, which was the most-watched drama series in 2013, and ran until 2018.

In 2020, Dusseldorp was announced to appear in Foxtel drama Wentworth in the role of Shelia Bausch.

In 2020, she played the role of Erica Bowden in the film version of the romantic comedy Ellie & Abbie (& Ellie's Dead Aunt), which the author, Monica Zanetti, wrote based on her own stage play.

Dusseldorp is co-creator and producer of the 2023 comedy series Bay of Fires, after she pitched the idea to writers and co-creators Andrew Knight and Max Dann. Dusseldorp's company (with her husband) Archipelago Productions, partnered with Fremantle Australia to produce Bay of Fires. Dusseldorp plays a lead role as a wealthy businesswoman, along with a number of other prominent actresses, such as Kerry Fox, Pamela Rabe, and Yael Stone. Bay of Fires was renewed for a second series in 2024. Season 2 debuted on 15 June 2025 in Australia on ABC iview and ABC TV.

Dusseldorp plays Sharon in and executive produced the film With or Without You, directed by Kelly Schilling and also starring Melina Vidler and Albert Mwangi, which premiered at the 2024 Adelaide Film Festival. The film, which was made in South Australia, was released in Australian cinemas in May 2025.

In August 2025, Dusseldorp appeared as guest host on ABC series Back Roads. Her episode titled “Tarkine” explored the Tarkine region of North West Tasmania, located in close proximity to the filming location of Bay of Fires.

== Recognition and awards ==
Dusseldorp won the award for Best Lead Actress in a Television Drama for Janet King in the 2015 Australian Academy of Cinema and Television Arts (AACTA) Awards.

Dusseldorp won the award for Best Female Actor in a Supporting Role in a Play in the 2009 Helpmann Awards for her performance as Queen Margaret in Benedict Andrews' The War of the Roses with the Sydney Theatre Company.

== Other activities ==
Dusseldorp and husband Ben Winspear set up their own stage and screen company, Archipelago Productions, after moving to Hobart, Tasmania, in 2018. Archipelago produces films, stage productions, art installations, and music.

In 2022 Düsseldorp was named as a member of the Screen Australia board and its campaign of 'Make It Australian'.

As of 2023, Dusseldorp is an ambassador for Save the Children Australia, in which role she has visited remote Aboriginal settlements in the Northern Territory. and an advocate for refugees as Australian representative in Australia for UNHCR.

On 24 March 2026, Dusseldorp was reappointed to the Screen Australia board for a further three years.

== Personal life ==
Dusseldorp is married to fellow actor Ben Winspear, and they have two children. Winspear, a National Institute of Dramatic Art-trained actor, has had a significant career in the theatre, including a stint as resident director of Sydney Theatre Company. Winspear was born in Wagga Wagga but raised in Hobart, and the whole family relocated to Hobart, Tasmania from Sydney in 2018. Winspear was a stay-at-home parent in 2020.

== Filmography ==
=== Films ===
Year	Title	Role	Notes	Ref
1997	Paradise Road	Helen van Praagh		
1998	Praise	Rachel		
2000	Innocence	Monique		
2001	Elly	Elly	Short film	
2002	Baggage Claim	Lisa	Short film	
2011	Burning Man	Lisa		
2013	The Railway Man	Memsahib (uncredited)	Scenes cut	
2020	Ellie & Abbie (& Ellie's Dead Aunt)	Erica		
2025	With or Without You	Sharon	Executive Producer	
2026	Caterpillar	Maxine		
2027	Before You Leave	Rose	Feature	

=== Television ===
Year	Title	Role	Notes	Ref
1992	G.P.	Sophie	"Dial the Universe" (#4.25)	
1996	Mercury	Lily-Ann Venables	"Bad News Is Good News" (#1.13)	
1997	Fable	Sarah	TV movie	
1999	Halifax f.p.	Glenys Lund	"A Murder of Crows" (#1.14)	
2000	All Saints	Inspector Debbie Bloom	4 episodes	
2000	Murder Call	Marion Dreyfuss	"Last Act" (#3.16)	
2002	Kangaroo Creek Gang	Actress		
2002	Farscape	Officer Yal Henta	2 episodes	
2002	Young Lions	Catherine McGregor	"Boy School Bullies" (#1.5)	
2003	After the Deluge	Eva	TV movie	
2003	MDA	Joanna Gilchrist	2 episodes	
2004	BlackJack: Sweet Science	Sam Lawson	TV movie	
2005	BlackJack: In the Money	Sam Lawson	TV movie	
2005	BlackJack: Ace Point Game	Sam Lawson	TV movie	
2005	Hell Has Harbour Views	Helen	TV movie	
2006	BlackJack: Dead Memory	Sam Lawson	TV movie	
2006	BlackJack: At the Gates	Sam Lawson	TV movie	
2007	BlackJack: Ghosts	Sam Lawson	TV movie	
2010	Rescue: Special Ops	Lisa Hartigan	"Locked In" (#2.3)	
2011	Crownies	Janet King	22 episodes	
2012	Jack Irish: Black Tide	Linda Hillier	TV movie	
2012	Jack Irish: Bad Debts	Linda Hillier	TV movie	
2012	Devil's Dust	Meredith Hellicar	2 episodes	
2013	Precinct 13	Anne Chalmers	1 episode	
2013–18	A Place to Call Home	Sarah Adams	67 episodes	
2014	Jack Irish: Dead Point	Linda Hillier	TV movie	
2014–17	Janet King	Janet King	24 episodes	
2014	Life on Us	Narrator	SBS documentary	
2016	Hatch, Match & Dispatch	Narrator	ABC documentary	
2016–21	Jack Irish	Linda Hillier	3 series (14 episodes)	
2020	Stateless	Margot	6 episodes	
2020–21	Wentworth	Sheila Bausch	Special guest star (4 episodes)	
2021	Wentworth Unlocked	Self	TV special	
2022	The Twelve	Lucy Bloom	10 episodes	
2022	Inside the Sydney Opera House	Narrator/Self	3 episodes	
2023	Appetite	Voicing		
2023, 2025	Bay of Fires	Stella Heikkinen	Main role, producer, co-creator	
2025	Back Roads	Self	Guest host for episode “Tarkine”	
2025	My Life Is Murder	Lydia	TV series: 1 episode (The Top Two Inches)	
2026	Who The Hell is Hamish?	TBA	TV series	

=== Production ===
Year	Title	Role	Notes
2016–17	Janet King	Associate Producer	
2023–25	Bay of Fires	Producer	Co-creator, actor
2024	With or Without You	Executive Producer	
