= Karl Zwicky =

Australian film director

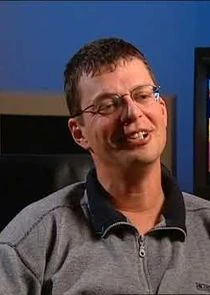
- Zwicky in 1999
- Occupation(s): Producer, director, screenwriter
- Years active: 1982–present

Karl Zwicky is an Australian film director, producer and screenwriter. He is known for directing the 1987 horror film Contagion and for his work on many television series between 1986 and 2012.

== Movies ==
| Year | Film | Functioned as | | | Notes |
| Year | Film | Director | Screenwriter | Producer | Notes |
|---|---|---|---|---|---|
| 1986 | The Humpty Dumpty Man | | Yes | | |
| 1987 | Contagion | Yes | | | |
| 1988 | To Make a Killing | Yes | Yes | | |
| 1997 | Paws | Yes | Yes | | |
| 2000 | The Magic Pudding | Yes | | | Based on book by same name |
| 2009 | A Model Daughter: The Killing of Caroline Byrne | | | Yes | TV movie |
| 2011 | Sinbad and The Minotaur | Yes | | | TV movie |

== Television series ==
- Power Rangers Dino Super Charge (2016) (3 episodes)
- Tricky Business (2012) (2 episodes)
- Crownies (2011) (22 episodes)
- Cops L.A.C. (2010) (4 episodes)
- K-9 (2010) (5 episodes)
- City Homicide (2009–2010) (4 episodes)
- Home and Away (2009–2019) (69 episodes)
- Neighbours (2008–2012) (16 episodes)
- Farscape (2003) (1 episode)
- Short Cuts (2002)
- The Lost World (2002) (1 episode)
- McLeod's Daughters (2001–2009) (163 episodes)
- BeastMaster (2001) (1 episode)
- Cushion Kids (2001) – Director
- Fairy Tale Police Department (2001–2002) – Director
- Hi-5 (1999) – Director
- Medivac (1998) (1 episode)
- All Saints (1998–2001) (4 episodes)
- Driven Crazy (1998) – Director
- Sweat (1996) (6 episodes)
- Heartbreak High (1994–1999) (25 episodes)
- Ship to Shore (1993) (6 episodes)
- The Comedy Sale (1993) (3 episodes)
- The New Adventures of Black Beauty (1992) (2 episodes)
- Police Rescue (1991) (1 episode)
- The Miraculous Mellops (1991–1992) (40 episodes)
- The Flying Doctors (1990) (3 episodes)
- Elly & Jools (1990) – Director
- The Gerry Connolly Show (1988) (6 episodes)
- Relative Merits (1987) – Director
- Fame and Misfortune (1986) – Director
- Sons and Daughters (1982–1983) (14 episodes)
