= Todd Lasance =

Australian actor (born 1985)

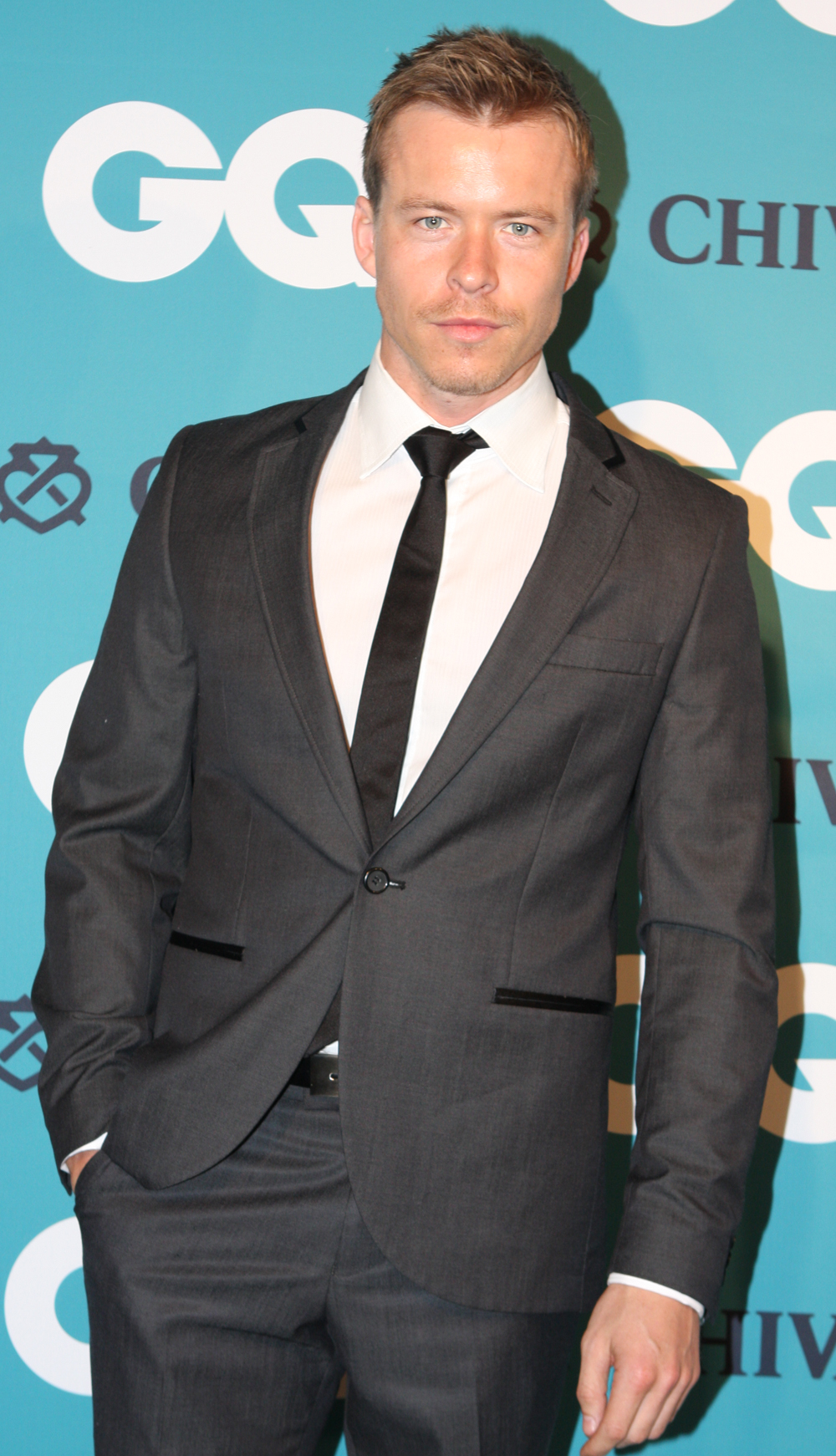
- Todd Lasance in 2012
- Born: Todd James Lasance; 18 February 1985 (age 41); Newcastle, New South Wales; Australia
- Occupation: Actor
- Years active: 2005–present
- Spouse: Jordan Wilcox (m. 2020)
- Children: 2

Todd James Lasance (born 18 February 1985) is an Australian actor, best recognised for his roles in Australian television including Aden Jefferies on Home and Away, Cam Jackson on Rescue: Special Ops, Ben McMahon on Crownies and Major Sydney "Syd" Cook on ANZAC Girls. He has also appeared in American television roles, such as Julius Caesar on Spartacus: War of the Damned, Julian on The Vampire Diaries and Edward Clariss / Rival on The Flash. In 2020, he partnered with his Spartacus co-star Liam McIntyre to create the gaming series Get Good for the CouchSoup YouTube channel, following a charity livestream benefiting Black Summer. He currently stars as Sergeant Jim "JD" Dempsey in the Network 10/Paramount+ series NCIS: Sydney.

== Career ==
In 2006, Lasance made his acting debut on the teen drama series Blue Water High. In 2007, he was cast in the Seven Network soap opera series Home and Away as Aden Jefferies, which is generally recognized as his breakout role. In October 2007, Seven announced he would become a regular for its 2008 season. In May 2009, he won the Logie Award for Most Popular Actor. In December 2009, Lasance announced he would be leaving the series with a view to pursuing his acting career in America. He filmed his final scenes on 11 December 2009.

In 2008, Lasance made his film debut with a small role in the film Fool's Gold. In 2010, Lasance was cast in one of the planned film spin-offs to the Australian crime drama series Underbelly. The film Underbelly Files: Tell Them Lucifer Was Here concerns the murder of two Victorian police officers and the subsequent hunt for their killers. He portrayed police detective Dean Thomas who was part of the investigation team. The film premiered on 7 February 2011.

In March 2010, the Sydney Morning Herald reported Lasance had signed on to co-star in the drama mini-series Cloudstreet, based on the Tim Winton novel of the same name, in which he played the role of Quick Lamb. The story follows the lives of two working-class Australian families who live together on One Cloud Street and was filmed in Perth. The series premiered on the subscription channel Showcase on 22 May 2011 to positive reviews from critics.

In September 2010, Nine Network announced Lasance had signed on to appear in a recurring role on the third season of the adventure drama series Rescue: Special Ops. He played the role of Cam Jackson, a member of a rival rescue firm which competes with the show's main team.

In January 2011, Lasance was confirmed to be a principal character on the ABC1 legal drama series Crownies in which he played the charismatic young lawyer Ben McMahon. The series reunited Lasance with his former Home and Away cast member Indiana Evans. The series premiered on 14 July 2011 and ran for one season.

After his appearance on Crownies, Lasance was cast in the Nine Network television film The Great Mint Swindle in the role of Peter Mickelberg, one of three Mickelberg brothers suspected of involvement in the Perth Mint Swindle. The film premiered on 11 March 2012 to mixed reviews from critics.

In 2012, Lasance played the role of the young Julius Caesar in the fourth and final season of the American historical action series Spartacus: War of the Damned. The season premiered on 25 January 2013.

Lasance reprised his role of Ben McMahon in the Crownies spin-off Janet King in 2017. In 2023, Lasance began playing the lead role of Sergeant Jim "JD" Dempsey in the Network 10/Paramount+ series NCIS: Sydney.

== Personal life ==
Lasance is the son of Robert and Jan Lasance and has an older brother, Chad. He and his family lived in the town of Medowie, New South Wales before moving to the nearby city of Newcastle in 2002. He attended St. Philip's Christian College and studied drama as part of his Higher School Certificate before receiving further formal training as an actor at Screenwise in Sydney. In December 2008, he returned to Screenwise to teach a short acting course for young students.

His acting career required him to relocate to Sydney where he shared a flat with former Home and Away co-star Mark Furze. He has also shared an apartment with Lincoln Lewis, who played his enemy on the show.

In December 2008, he appeared in the music video of the song "Favourite Habit", by Mark Furze's band Falcon Road. He was a candidate for the 2009 Cleo Bachelor of the Year.

Lasance was involved in a car accident on 10 August 2008 in which his Toyota Supra collided with an elderly woman's Honda Civic. He and his passenger escaped with minor injuries, while the elderly driver was taken to hospital in a serious condition but later recovered sufficiently to be released.

Lasance and wife Jordan Wilcox welcomed their first child, a daughter in 2016 and their second child, a son in 2023.

=== Arrest ===
On 12 December 2009, Lasance was arrested at a Kings Cross nightclub in Sydney for possession of cocaine. He was subsequently ordered to serve a 12-month good behaviour bond. This good behaviour bond has since been lifted.

== Filmography ==
=== Film ===
Year	Title	Role	Notes
	BlackJack	Stephen Hulce	TV film series
2008	Fool's Gold	Frat Boy #2	Feature film
2015	Terminus	Zach Aronson	Feature film
2021	Without Remorse	Dallas	Feature film
2022	Black Site	Darren Wesley	Feature film
2023	True Spirit	Craig Atherton	Feature film

=== Television ===
Year	Title	Role	Notes
2005–10	Home and Away	Aden Jefferies	482 episodes
2006	Blue Water High	Chris	2 episodes
2007	McLeod's Daughters	Brad	Episode: "Bloodlines"
2011	Underbelly Files: Tell Them Lucifer was Here	Sgt. Dean Thomas	Television film
2011	Cloudstreet	Quick Lamb	Episode: "Part 3"
2011	Rescue: Special Ops	Cam Jackson	8 episodes
2011	Crownies	Ben McMahon	22 episodes
2012	The Great Mint Swindle	Peter Mickelberg	Television film
2012	Bikie Wars: Brothers in Arms	Kiddo	4 episodes
2013	Spartacus: War of the Damned	Julius Caesar	9 episodes
2014	ANZAC Girls	Major Sydney "Syd" Cook	6 episodes
2015–16	The Vampire Diaries	Julian	10 episodes
2016	The Flash	Edward Clariss / Rival	3 episodes
2017	Janet King	Ben McMahon	Episode: "Running Out the Clock"
2018	Underbelly Files: Chopper	Syd Collins	Miniseries
2018	Olivia Newton-John: Hopelessly Devoted to You	Lee Kramer	Miniseries
2018	Bite Club	Dan Cooper	8 episodes
2022	The Secrets She Keeps	Jack Shaughnessy	6 episodes
2022	Darby and Joan	Riley Harrington	1 episode
2023–present	NCIS: Sydney	Jim 'JD' Dempsey	Main role

== Awards and nominations ==
Year	Award	Category	Work	Result
2009	TV Week Logie Awards	Silver Logie for Most Popular Actor	Home and Away	Won
2010	TV Week Logie Awards	Silver Logie for Most Popular Actor	Home and Away	Nominated
2011	Jameson IF Awards	Out of the Box	Crownies	Nominated
2011	AACTA Awards	Best Guest or Supporting Actor	Cloudstreet	Nominated
