= Hamish Michael =

Australian actor

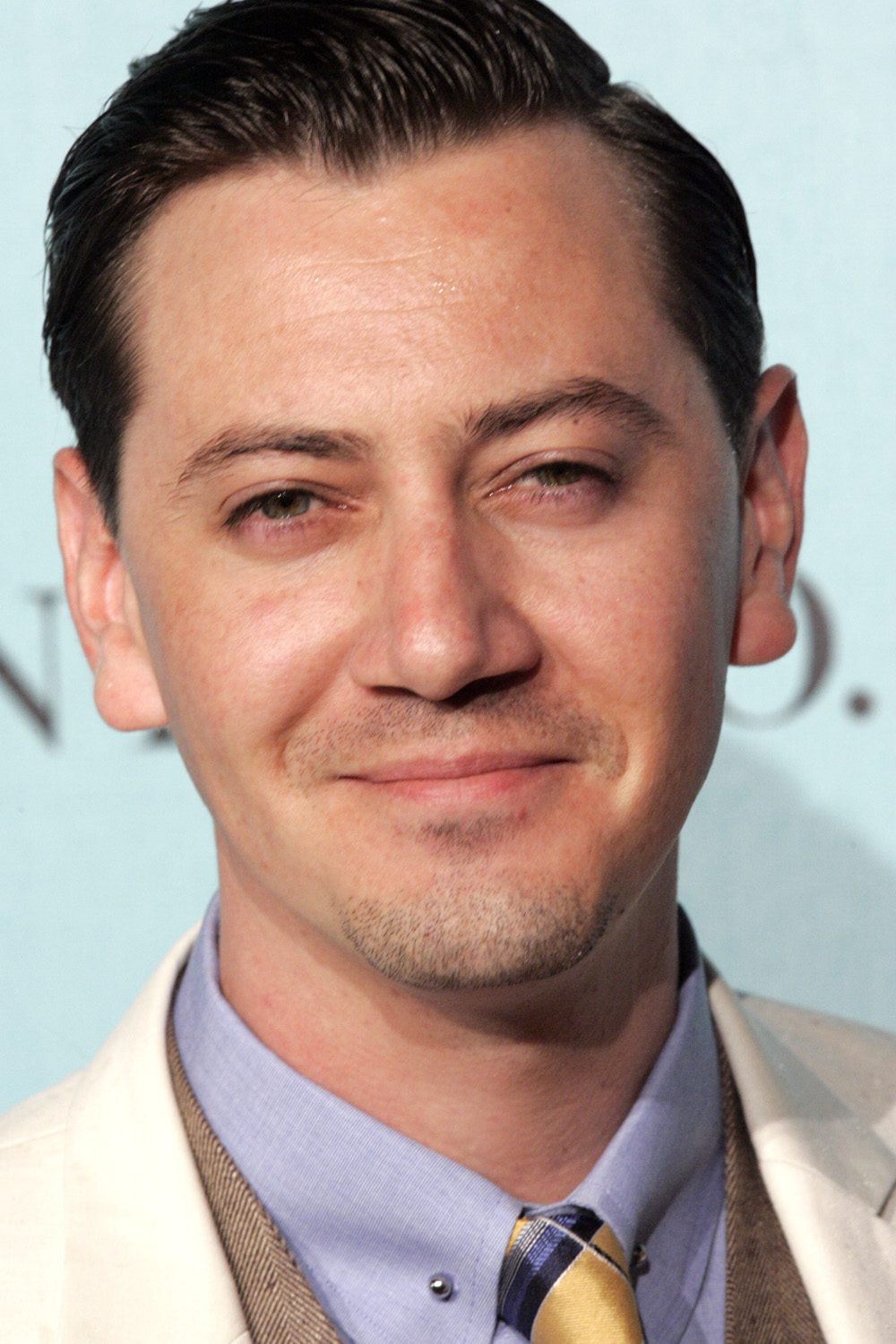
- Occupation: Actor
- Years active: 2002-Present
- Notable work: Crownies; Janet King; The Twelve
- Spouse: Kate Mulvany (m. 2015)

Hamish Michael is an Australian actor. Michael is also a voice artist.

== Career ==
For his performance in Crownies he was nominated for the 2012 Logie Award for Most Outstanding Newcomer. and for its spin off series Janet King he was nominated for the 2016 AACTA Award for Best Guest or Supporting Actor in a Television Drama. At the 6th Helpmann Awards he was nominated for the Helpmann Award for Best Male Actor in a Supporting Role in a Play for Two Brothers (Melbourne Theatre Company & Sydney Theatre Company). Other featured roles include The Twelve, Howzat! Kerry Packer's War and Power Games: The Packer–Murdoch War.

In June 2024, Michael was named for the second series of Stan series Scrublands.

On 13 February 2025, Michael was announced for Liam Neeson–led film The Mongoose.

== Personal life ==
Michael is married to actress Kate Mulvany.

== Filmography ==
Year	Title	Role	Notes	Ref
2026	The Airport Chaplain	Troy Cameron	4 episodes	
2025	Scrublands: Silver	Jasper Speight	4 episodes	
2025	Apple Cider Vinegar	Jeremy	4 episodes	
2024	Ladies in Black	Ken Marlow	4 episodes	
2022	The Twelve	James Merrick	9 episodes	
2021	Frayed	Fairbank	6 episodes	
2019	Total Control	Kosta	2 episodes	
2017	Rosehaven	Steve	4 episodes	
2016–2017	Doctor Doctor	Tim	3 episodes	
2014–2017	Janet King	Richard Stirling	24 episodes	
2014–2016	Black Comedy	Guest Cast	4 episodes	
2015	Ready for This	Mr. Bott	5 episodes	
2013	Miss Fisher's Murder Mysteries	Raymond Hirsch	1 episode	
2013	Redfern Now	Steven	1 episode	
2013	Power Games: The Packer–Murdoch War	Bruce Gyngell	2 episodes	
2012	Howzat! Kerry Packer's War	Doug Walters	2 episodes	
2011	Crownies	Richard Stirling	22 episodes	
2010–2011	Spirited	Young Billy Brixton	3 episodes	
2008	City Homicide	Marcus Linton	1 episode	
2006	Nightmares & Dreamscapes	Road Virus	1 episode	
2004–2006	Blue Heelers	Leon Dyer / Antony Beaumont	2 episodes	
2005	Heartbreak Tour	Jason	TV Movie	
2004–2005	The Secret Life of Us	Mini Evan	3 episodes	
2002–2004	Stingers	Callum Lewis / Tony McKinnon	2 episodes	

=== Film/Shorts ===
Year	Title	Role	Notes	Ref
TBA	The Mongoose			
2025	One More Shot	C-Word		
2021	Shark	Best Man	Short	
2019	Little Monsters	Sara's Friend		
2013	The Great Gatsby	Clerk-Probity Trust		
2007	Heaven	Jamie	Short	
2007	Lucky Miles	Peter Coade		
2007	Em 4 Jay	Steve		
2004	Homesick	Nick Collins	Short	
2003	Sweetness and Light	Billy	Short	
2002	The Only Person in the World	Damien	Short	
