= Nicholas Cowdery =

Australian barrister

Nichols Cowdery AO, KC
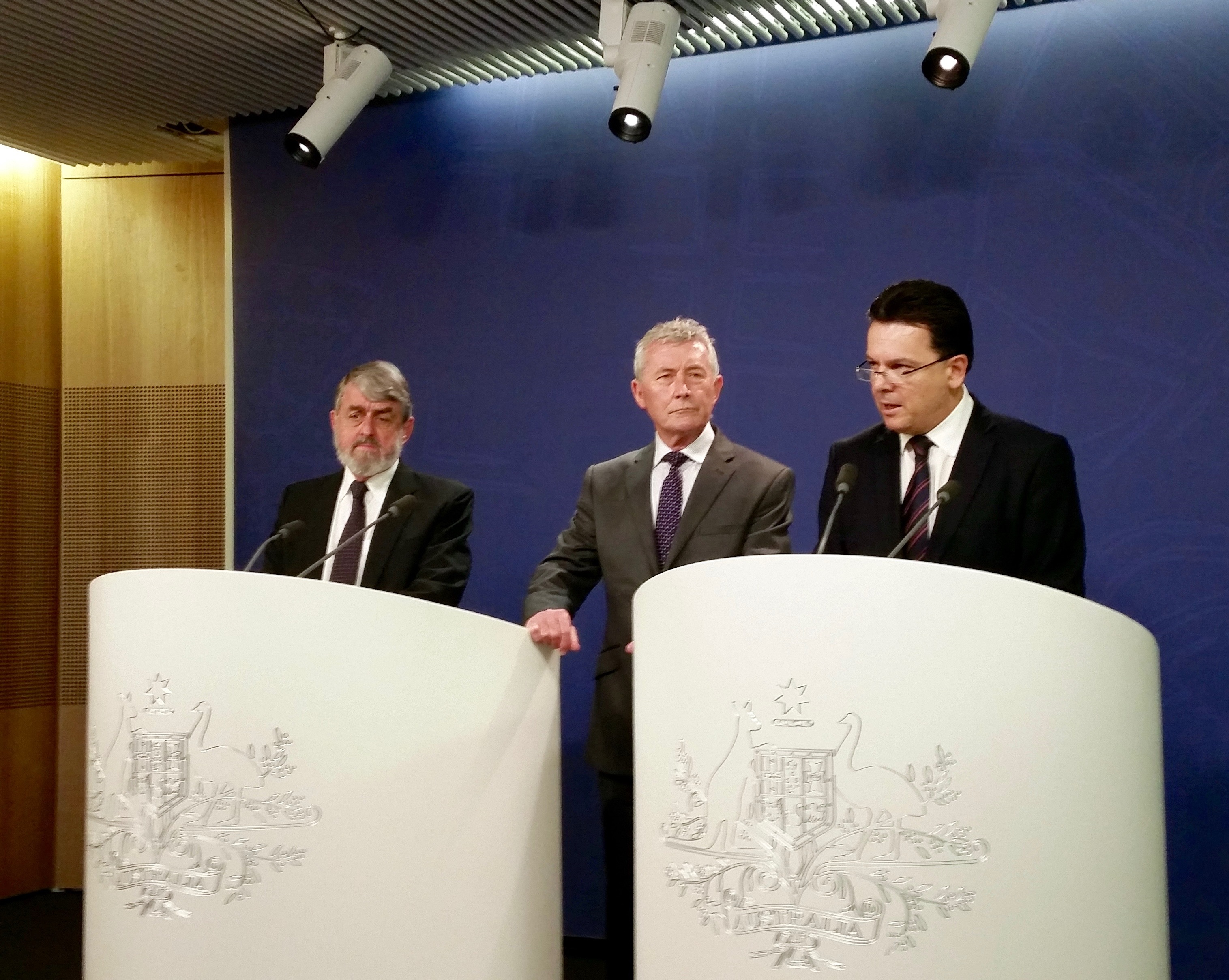
- Cowdery (left) in 2015
- Born: Nicholas Richard Cowdery; 19 March 1946 (age 80)
- Education: University of Sydney; Wollongong High School; Sydney Grammar School
- Occupations: Barrister; NSW Director of Public Prosecutions
- Years active: 1994 – 2011
- Awards: Member of the Order of Australia (2003); Officer of the Order of Australia (2019); Honorary Doctor of Laws (UoW: 2011)

Nicholas Richard Cowdery AO, KC (born 19 March 1946), is a barrister who served as the Director of Public Prosecutions for the Australian state of New South Wales from 1994 to 2011. Cowdery also served as president of the International Association of Prosecutors from 1999 to 2005.

== Early life and education ==
Cowdery attended Wollongong High School and completed his secondary schooling at the Sydney Grammar School. He graduated in Arts and Law at the University of Sydney where he was a resident of St. Paul's College, where he is now an Honorary Fellow.

Cowdery was awarded with an Honorary Doctor of Laws from the University of Wollongong in 2011.

== Career ==
In 1971, he commenced practising as a public defender in Papua New Guinea after admission as a barrister in the same year. Cowdery entered private practice in 1975, where he stayed until 1994, concentrating on criminal law, common law, administrative law and some commercial law. He was appointed Queen's Counsel in 1987, served as an Associate Judge of the District Court between 1988 and 1990.

Cowdery was appointed the director of public prosecutions for New South Wales in 1994, and ended his sixteen-year tenure in 2011. During his term as NSW Director of Public Prosecutions he was, according to Phillip Adams "... an outspoken critic of the pace and style of drug reform, .... and of the mandatory sentencing regimes in the Northern Territory and Western Australia. With his office independent of government, Cowdery would often speak out publicly against politicians - especially if he disagreed with them. Cowdery's notable successful prosecutions include Ivan Milat, Gordon Wood, and Keli Lane.

Cowdery was elected president of the International Association of Prosecutors in 1999 and re-elected to a second three-year term in September 2002. Since his retirement as public prosecutor, he holds a number of honorary academic positions including as an adjunct professor of law at the University of Sydney's Institute of Criminology; an adjunct professor of law at the University of New South Wales. Cowdery is also a Fellow of the Australian Academy of Law.

Cowdery is president of the International Commission of Jurists (Australian Section), chair of the National Human Rights Committee of the Law Council of Australia, a director and patron of the Justice Reform Initiative, and a past president of the NSW Council for Civil Liberties.

Cowdery was chairman of White Ribbon Australia before standing down after it was revealed in the media that Cowdery had earlier made comments about the sex life of Keli Lane, a convicted murderer.

== Honours ==
Cowdery was appointed a Member of the Order of Australia in June 2003; and an Officer of the Order in June 2019 in recognition of his distinguished service to the law, to the protection of human rights, to professional legal bodies, and to the community.

== Selected published works ==
- Cowdery, Nicholas (1999). "Mandatory Life Sentences in New South Wales". UNSW Law Journal. 22 (1). 290.
- Cowdery, Nicholas (2001). Getting justice wrong : myths, media and crime. Crows Nest, NSW: Allen & Unwin. ISBN 978-1-86508-322-3.
- Cowdery, Nicholas (22 March 2005). Creative sentencing & plea bargaining : does it happen and what are the results?. LAWASIAdownunder. pp. Session 9.1.
- Cowdery, Nicholas (2011), Reforming the criminal justice system [electronic resource], Office of the Director of Public Prosecutions
- Cowdery, Nicholas; Chin, Rachael Jane (2019), Frank & fearless, NewSouth Publishing, ISBN 978-1-74224-910-0
- Cowdery, Nicholas Discretion in Criminal Justice, 2023, LexisNexis

Legal offices
Preceded by Reg Blanch	Director of Public Prosecutions; 1994 – 2011	Succeeded by Lloyd Babb
