= Director of Public Prosecutions (New South Wales) =

Independent law officer

New South Wales Office of the Director of Public Prosecutions
Agency overview
- Formed: 13 July 1987
- Type: Department
- Jurisdiction: New South Wales
- Headquarters: Level 6, 252 Pitt Street, Sydney, Australia
- Minister responsible: Attorney General of New South Wales
- Agency executive: Sally Dowling SC, Director of Public Prosecutions
- Parent Agency: New South Wales Department of Communities and Justice
- Key document: Director of Public Prosecutions Act 1986 (NSW)

The New South Wales Office of the Director of Public Prosecutions (ODPP) is an independent prosecuting service and government agency within the portfolio of the Attorney General of New South Wales. Of all prosecuting services in Australia, the ODPP has the largest caseload, staff, and budget.

The current Director of Public Prosecutions is Sally Dowling SC.

== History ==
The ODPP was established by the Director of Public Prosecutions Act 1986 (NSW) and began its operations on 13 July 1987.

=== Directors ===
Ordinal	Officeholder	Term start	Term end	Time in office	Notes
1	Reg Blanch QC	1987	1994	6–7 years	
2	Nicholas Cowdery AM, QC	1994	30 June 2011	16–17 years	
3	Lloyd Babb SC	1 July 2011	30 June 2021	9 years, 364 days	
4	Sally Dowling SC	1 July 2021	incumbent	5 years, 138 days	

=== Deputy Directors ===
Deputy Directors	Period
Michael Alan Viney QC	1987 – 1990
Unknown	1990 – 1997
Martin Blackmore SC	1997 – March 2002
Greg Smith SC	April 2002 – November 2006
David Frearson SC	November 2007 – 2 March 2009
Donna Woodburne SC	4 June 2009 – January 2011
Christopher Maxwell QC (acting)	January 2011 – February 2012
John Pickering SC	February 2012 – May 2016
Kara Shead SC	May 2016 – date
Deputy Director	Period
Unknown	1987 – 1999
Roy Ellis	November 1999 – 11 August 2003
Luigi Lamprati SC	December 2003 – October 2011
David Arnott SC (acting)	October 2011 – November 2011
Keith Alder	November 2011 – date

== Function ==
In general, it is for the prosecution, not the courts, to decide who is prosecuted and for what offences. It is the prosecution's sole discretion to shape its charges, and as a result, to influence what may follow in the trial. The functions of the Director of Public Prosecutions, per the Director of Public Prosecutions Act 1986 (NSW) (i.e., the DPP Act), include:

- prosecution of all committal proceedings and some summary proceedings before the Local Courts;
- prosecution of indictable offences in the District and Supreme Courts;
- conduct of District Court, Court of Criminal Appeal and High Court appeals on behalf of the Crown; and,
- conduct of related proceedings in the Supreme Court and Court of Appeal.

Furthermore, under the DPP Act, the Director has similar functions with regard to:

- finding a bill of indictment, or determining that no bill of indictment be found, in respect of an indictable offence, in circumstances where the person concerned has been committed for trial;
- directing that no further proceeding be taken against a person who has been committed for trial or sentence; and,
- finding a bill of indictment in respect of an indictable offence, in circumstances where the person concerned has not been committed for trial.

Section 21 of the DPP Act provides that the Director may appear in person or may be represented by a counsel or solicitor in any proceedings which are carried on by the Director.

The functions of the Solicitor for Public Prosecutions are prescribed in section 23 of the DPP Act. These are:

- to act as solicitor for the Director in the exercise of the Director's functions; and,
- to instruct the Crown Prosecutors and other counsel on behalf of the Director.

The functions of Crown Prosecutors are set out in section 5 of the Crown Prosecutors Act 1986. They include:

- to conduct, and appear as counsel in, proceedings on behalf of the Director;
- to find a bill of indictment in respect of an indictable offence;
- to advise the Director in respect of any matter referred for advice by the Director; and,
- to carry out such other functions of counsel as the Director approves.

== Organisation ==
The ODPP consists of:

- the Director, two Deputy Directors, and their legal and administrative support staff;
- the Crown Prosecutors and their administrative support staff;
- the Solicitor for Public Prosecutions, the solicitors, witness assistance officers, and administrative support staff employed in the Solicitor for Public Prosecution's Office; and,
- the Corporate Services Division.

The Director, Deputy Directors, the Crown Prosecutors, and the Solicitor for Public Prosecutions are statutorily appointed office holders under the DPP Act.

The relationship between the Director, the Crown Prosecutors, and the Solicitor, is somewhat analogous to that which exists between client, counsel, and solicitor in the private sector. The Corporate Services Division provides financial, personnel, information technology, and property services to the other three groupings in the ODPP.

The ODPP Head Office, where the Director, the two Deputy Directors, and their support staff are based, located at 175 Liverpool Street. In Western Sydney, the ODPP has three offices, located at Parramatta, Penrith, and Campbelltown. In regional New South Wales, the ODPP has six offices, located at Lismore, Newcastle, Gosford, Wagga Wagga, Dubbo and Wollongong.

Each of the ODPP offices is staffed by Crown Prosecutors, solicitors, and administrative officers. Each office conducts prosecutions in the relevant Local, District, and Supreme Courts. Witness Assistance Service officers, who are generally social workers or psychologists, are also located in each Office. The officers of this Service provide assistance, support, referral to support agencies, and information to civilian prosecution witnesses.

== See also ==
- Director of Public Prosecutions (Australia)
- Director of Public Prosecutions (Victoria)
