= Ned Manning =

Australian actor and playwright (born 1950)

- Born: 1950 (age 75–76)
- Occupations: Playwright, actor, teacher
- Spouse(s): Bronwyn Bancroft (1); Marion Potts (2)
- Children: Jack Manning Bancroft, 3 others

Ned Manning (born 1950) is an Australian playwright, actor and teacher. His film credits include the lead role in Dead End Drive-In (1986), and television credits include The Shiralee and Prisoner, and Brides of Christ. His plays include Us or Them, Milo, Kenny's Coming Home and Close to the Bone. In 2007 Manning played the lead in his own play, Last One Standing, at the Old Fitzroy Theatre in Sydney.

== Early life ==
Ned Manning was born in Coonabarabran, New South Wales in 1950, where he grew up on a property. His father was a progressive Labour shire president, and his mother was a socialite and budding artist. His mother died when he was twelve years old, and he wasn't particularly close with his father.

== Career ==
=== Theatre ===
Manning's first play, Us or Them, was initially produced at the Childers Street Hall in Canberra on 1 November 1977. It was then re-written and performed in 1984 at the Stables Theatre in Sydney for the Griffin Theatre Company, where it marked a turning point in Griffin's history as the play's success led to the cast and creatives being paid full professional rates. The play then transferred to the Phillip Street Theatre and on to the Q Theatre in Penrith.

Milo premiered at the Sydney Theatre Company's Wharf 2 Theatre in October 1984 before productions at the Q Theatre, Theatre Up North in Townsville, Theatre South in Wollongong and regional performances. Milo has been recorded for Radio National, had numerous other productions, and also been published by Currency Press.

Manning's next play, Kenny's Coming Home (1991), was performed at the Q Theatre, Penrith and was subsequently recorded for radio on ABC Radio National. The play is centred on a Rugby league footballer, Kenny, who gets caught up in a preselection battle between two of his family members. Kenny's Coming Home included songs by Shane McNamara.

Close to the Bone was written in collaboration with the Indigenous students at the Eora Centre, and first produced there in September 1991. Luck of the Draw was produced by the Darwin Theatre Company in May 1999 and was the first play written by a non-Indigenous writer to be produced by Kooemba Jdarra theatre company in Brisbane. Last One Standing was performed at Sydney theatre the Old Fitzroy in 2007. Manning played lead character Joe in the Old Fitzroy production.

In 1989 Manning directed the Belvoir St Theatre production of a play, Black Cockatoos, about the relationship between a white woman and an Aboriginal man.

Manning has created many works for young audiences. He has prepared scripts for ten works for The Bell Shakespeare Company's Actors at Work program, a travelling community and schools theatrical education initiative. Other plays for young people have included Alice Dreaming, which is one of the Australian Script Centre's anthology of large cast plays. In 2012 he contributed to a Federation Press anthology of monologues for drama students, No Nudity, Weapons or Naked Flames. His play Romeo and Juliet Intensive was nominated for a 2011 AWGIE Award.

=== Film and television ===
Manning's film credits include the lead role in the 1986 Ozploitation film Dead End Drive-In. Based on a Peter Carey short story called "Crabs", Dead End Drive-In is a post-apocalyptic tale about a young man stranded in a small town's drive-in theater when the wheels are stolen off his car. He finds himself amongst a community of misfits trapped at the site, and seeks to break out. The film, directed by Brian Trenchard-Smith, received mixed reviews and it is one of American film director Quentin Tarantino's favourites. The film received only a short box-office season; Manning was critical of the distributor Greater Union and worked with the film's other actors to secure separate release in independent cinemas.

Manning's other film credits include appearances in the 1985 film Rebel (alongside Matt Dillon and Debra Byrne), 2000 teen film Looking for Alibrandi (alongside Pia Miranda and Anthony LaPaglia). and 2003 made for television crime film The Postcard Bandit (opposite the late Tom Long). In 1998 he appeared in docudrama Aftershocks, based on the 1989 Newcastle earthquake. He also made several short films including, Love Bites. His most recent film was The Menkoff Method, opposite Noah Taylor in 2016.

Manning's television credits include 1984 biographical cricket miniseries Bodyline (alongside Hugo Weaving), 1987 miniseries The Shiralee (alongside Bryan Brown), 1991 miniseries Brides of Christ (alongside Naomi Watts) and several episodes of miniseries Tanamera – Lion of Singapore. He had a recurring role as Nick Clarke in Prisoner in 1981.

He has made guest appearances in numerous other television series including The Restless Years, Young Ramsay, Cop Shop, Bellamy, A Country Practice, Rafferty's Rules, Home and Away, Heartbreak High, Big Sky, Changi, White Collar Blue, All Saints, Offspring, Neighbours and Mr Inbetween.

=== Author and teacher ===
In 2012, NewSouth Books published Manning's memoir of a life of school teaching, '"Playground Duty".

The same year, he also released his debut novel "Painting the Light" – a love letter to his parents, published by Broadcast Books.

Manning taught at Newtown High School of the Performing Arts where he was a Senior Examiner in HSC Drama, and developed a playwrighting program. He has helped local and refugee students write and perform their own plays in Bendigo and at the MTC. He has also taught playwriting at Monash University. He once received a NSW Premiers Teachers Scholarship.

== Filmography ==
=== Film ===
Year	Title	Role	Type
1979	The Odd Angry Shot	John	Feature film
1983	Debris	William	
1984	G'day Love	Baz	
1985	Rebel	Private Jones	Feature film
1986	Dead End Drive-In	Jimmy 'Crabs' Rossini	Feature film
1993	Get Away, Get Away	Benny the Brain	Feature film
1998	Aftershocks	Stan Gill	TV movie
2000	Looking for Alibrandi	Mr Coote	Feature film
2003	The Postcard Bandit	Branch Manager	TV movie
2004	The Fall of the House	Detective Travenar	Short film
2011	Random 8	Paul Wilson	Short film
2016	The Menkoff Method	Harold	Feature film

=== Television ===
Year	Title	Role	Type
1977	The Restless Years	Danny Woodward	TV series
1980	Young Ramsay	Joe Taylor	TV series, season 2, episode 5: "Gift Horse"
1980	Cop Shop	Paul Filby	TV series, 2 episodes
1981	Prisoner	Nick Clarke	TV series, season 3, 8 episodes
1981	Bellamy	Sims	TV series, episode 7: "Daring Young Man"
1982	1915	Captain Ashworth	Miniseries, episode 4: "Your Country Needs You"
1982–1993	A Country Practice	Paul Adams / Benny Benson / Col Bailey / Jeremy Small	TV series, 6 episodes
1984	Bodyline	Jack Fingleton	Miniseries, 2 episodes
1987	The Shiralee	Jim	Miniseries, 2 episodes
1987	Pals	Oscar	TV series, 10 episodes
1988	Rafferty’s Rules	Ross Hurle	TV series, season 4, episode 4: "Sense of Duty"
1988	Australians	Mick Hawkins	Miniseries, episode 1: "Les Darcy"
1988	The Dirtwater Dynasty	David Eastwick II	Miniseries, 2 episodes
1989	Naked Under Capricorn	Tom Copeland	Miniseries, 2 episodes
	G.P.	Ned	TV series
1990	Home and Away	Robbo	TV series, 1 episode
1991	Brides of Christ	Sean	Miniseries, 1 episode
1989–1992	Tanamera – Lion of Singapore	Ray	Miniseries, 7 episodes
1994	Heartbreak High	Marty	TV series, season 1, episode 17
1995	Soldier Soldier	Ed Grisham	TV series, season 5, episode 5: "Far Away"
1996	Naked: Stories of Men	Davo	Anthology series, episode 6: "Cross Turning Over"
1999	Big Sky	Ray	TV series, season 2, episode 3: "Stand by Your Man"
2001	The Farm	Eddie McCormick	Miniseries, 3 episodes
2001	Australians at War	Various characters	Documentary
2001	Changi	John	Miniseries, episode 6: "Pacifying the Angels"
2003	White Collar Blue	Brendan McAlister	TV series, season 1, episode 22: "Pacifying the Angels"
	Mr. Chifley’s 50 Days	Communist Official	
2003; 2007	All Saints	Angus Skinner / John Leopold	TV series, 2 episodes
2012	Offspring	Dream Dr Noonan	TV series, season 3, 1 episode
2013	Neighbours	Eddie Lawson	TV series, 2 episodes
2021	Mr Inbetween	Reg	TV series, season 3, episode 8: "I'll See You Soon"

== Theatre ==
=== As actor ===
Year	Title	Role	Type
1976	The Changing Room	Billy	Acton Theatre with Canberra Repertory Society
1976	Female Transport	Tommy	Acton Theatre with Canberra Repertory Society
1977; 1984; 1985	Us or Them	Robert Whitcan	Childers Street Hall, Canberra, Stables Theatre, Sydney with Griffin Theatre Company, Phillip Street Theatre, Sydney, Q Theatre, Penrith, Playhouse, Newcastle, Playhouse, Canberra, Bondi Pavilion, Sydney
1978	The Salzburg Everyman		Civic Square, Canberra with Fortune Theatre Company
	Romeo and Juliet	Romeo	Canberra Repertory
	Twelfth Night	Sebastian	Canberra Repertory
1978	Norm and Ahmed	Steward	Canberra Theatre with Fortune Theatre Company
1978	Nathan and Tabileth	Bernie	Canberra Theatre with Fortune Theatre Company
1980	The Precious Woman	Rebel / Servant / Soldier	Sydney Opera House with STC
	Hamlet	Various roles	STC
	Street Level	Glen	Griffin Theatre Company
1985	Wet Dreams	Gary	Cell Block Theatre for Sydney Festival
	Dreams of a Salesman	Biff	STC
	Betrayal	Robert	STC
1993	Daylight Saving	Tom Finn	Q Theatre, Penrith
2007	Last One Standing	Joe	Old Fitzroy Theatre, Sydney with Tamarama Rock Surfers

=== As writer / director ===
Year	Title	Role	Type
1977; 1984; 1985	Us or Them	Playwright	Childers Street Hall, Canberra, Stables Theatre, Sydney with Griffin Theatre Company, Phillip Street Theatre, Sydney, Q Theatre, Penrith, Playhouse, Newcastle, Playhouse, Canberra, Bondi Pavilion, Sydney
1980	Kim	Playwright	Australian National University, Canberra, Playhouse, Canberra with Peppercorn Productions
1984	Verbals	Production Assistant	Stables Theatre, Sydney with Griffin Theatre Company
1989	Black Cockatoos	Director	Belvoir St Theatre, Sydney
1991; 1992	Close to the Bone	Playwright	Eora Centre Sydney, Price Theatre, Adelaide, Q Theatre, Penrith
1991	Kenny's Coming Home	Playwright	Q Theatre, Penrith
1994; 2001	Milo	Playwright	Wharf 2 Theatre, Sydney with STC, Q Theatre, Penrith, Theatre Up North, Townsville, Theatre South, Wollongong, regional tour, Queanbeyan Bicentennial Function Centre, Bridge Theatre, Coniston, Riverside Theatres Parramatta
1999; 2000	Luck of the Draw	Playwright	Brown's Mart Theatre, Darwin with Darwin Theatre Company, Cremorne Theatre, Brisbane with Kooemba Jdarra Theatre Company
2004–2022	Alice Dreaming	Playwright / Director	Wharf Theatre, Sydney, Michael Hoskins Creative Arts Centre, Armidale, Auckland Performing Arts Centre, Malthouse Theatre, Melbourne, Noosa Arts Theatre, Nexus Theatre, Perth, Dreamhouse Theatre, Melbourne, Young People's Theatre, Hamilton & extensive school touring
2007	Last One Standing	Playwright	Old Fitzroy Theatre, Sydney with Tamarama Rock Surfers
2009; 2011; 2018	Women of Troy	Adaptor	Studio Theatre, Sydney, Luther College, Croydon, NIDA Parade Theatre, Sydney
2010	Stories from the 428	Playwright	Sidetrack Theatre, Sydney
2015; 2019; 2020	Love's Magic	Adaptor / Director / Playwright	Melbourne Girls Grammar School, Southern Highlands Christian School, Bowral, 3 Sisters Youth Theatre, Leura
2016; 2023	Macbeth Intensive	Playwright / Adaptor	Frederick Irwin Anglican School, Perth, Scots School Albury
2016	The Bridge is Down	Playwright	Mitcham Girls High School, Adelaide
2019	Magic Box	Playwright	Castlecrag, Sydney
2020	Dagger's Drawn	Adaptor	Notre Dame College, Shepparton
2023	Romeo and Juliet Intensive	Adaptor	Scots School Albury; Nominated for a 2011 AWGIE Award

== Publications ==
Year	Title	Role	Type
2012	Painting the Light	Writer	Debut novel, Broadcast Books
2012	No Nudity, Weapons or Naked Flames – Monologues for Drama Students by 7-On	Contributor	Anthology of plays
2012	Playground Duty	Writer	Teaching memoir, NewSouth Books
2012	Drama Reloaded	Contributor	Textbook, Cambridge
	Shakespeare for Australian Schools	Writer	Teaching resource, series of 10 scripts
	Alice Dreaming	Writer	Teaching resource

== Personal life and family ==
Manning married Bronwyn Bancroft, an Indigenous Australian artist, with whom he had two children, including New South Wales Young Australian of the Year for 2010, Jack Manning Bancroft.

Manning remarried to theatre director Marion Potts, with whom he had two children. In 2010, they relocated from Sydney to Melbourne when she was appointed director of the Malthouse Theatre.
