= Fayssal Bazzi =

Lebanese actor

- Born: 1982 (age 43–44); Beirut, Lebanon
- Occupation: Actor
- Years active: 2000s–present
- Known for: Best lead actor winner 10th AACTA Awards for Stateless

Fayssal Bazzi (Arabic: فيصل بزي; born 1982) is a Lebanese-Australian actor. He was nominated for the 2018 AACTA Award for Best Actor in a Supporting Role for his role in The Merger and again in 2020 for Measure for Measure.

== Early life ==
Bazzi was born in Beirut, Lebanon, to a Lebanese father and a Syrian mother. As his mother was a French teacher, Bazzi learned to speak French fluently alongside Arabic. When he was 3 years old, his family moved to Australia after the Lebanese Civil War.

When immigrating to Australia, the Bazzis lost their immigration records. Bazzi was often bullied as a child as he did not initially speak English. His parents transferred him to a Catholic school, and he eventually learned English after a teacher decided to personally teach him. He was inspired to become an actor by that teacher.

== Career ==
Bazzi started his acting career in his early 20s, in the early 2000s. As a child he was a fan of Star Wars and anime, so he was keen to work in the fantasy genre, however in the aftermath of 9/11 he found that he was pigeonholed as an Arab man, in terms of the way the industry viewed him.

His career began in theatre. After securing an agent, Bazzi started attending screen auditions in the early to mid-2000s, but based on the amount of rejection he experienced based on his ethnic background, he realised the theatre culture was more progressive than screen, allowing him a lot more casting scope and creative and cultural input. He continued to audition for screen roles regardless, and started to be cast in guest roles.

While touring Australia with a play called Food, Bazzi secured a part on the film Down Under – a black comedy based on the racial tensions in the wake of the real-life 2005 Cronulla riots. He starred alongside Alexander England, Damon Herriman, Justin Rosniak and Lincoln Younes.

After a decade of guest roles, supporting roles, and short films, Bazzi performed as part of a six month national tour of The Merchant of Venice with Bell Shakespeare, before finishing the tour early to film his first lead role in 2018 drama comedy movie The Merger.

Prior to leaving on a holiday, Bazzi auditioned for the recurring role of Nasir in season 2 of comedy drama series Mr Inbetween, and for a lead role as Ameer, a Syrian refugee in 2020 miniseries Stateless, both of which he secured and started filming on his return. In the latter series, he starred opposite Cate Blanchett, Yvonne Strahovski, Jai Courtney, Dominic West and Asher Keddie, and had to learn to speak Dari, an Afghan language. He was then was offered a part on The Commons, before having to fly to Timor-Leste to finish filming overseas scenes for Stateless.

In 2023, Bazzi was announced and appeared in several television projects including SBS' Erotic Stories, Total Control's final season, and the second season of Australian legal drama The Twelve. He also appeared in Australian/American co-produced horror film Late Night with the Devil. He was then named for legal thriller The Correspondent.

== Personal life ==
Bazzi has been in a relationship with fellow Australian actor Catherine Văn-Davies since 2014.

== Filmography ==
=== Television ===
Year	Title	Role	Notes	Ref
2007	East West 101	Ali	1 episode	
2008	The Strip	Joe Abadi	2 episodes	
2008	Double the Fist	Evil Clown	1 episode	
2008	All Saints	Tim Spillane	1 episode	
2008	Stupid, Stupid Man	Daniel	1 episode	
2011	Tough Nuts: Australia’s Hardest Criminals	Dino Dibra	1 episode	
2011	Crownies	Mustafa Al-Tikriti	1 episode	
2017	The Letdown	Tony	1 episode	
2017	Wake in Fright	Donald	2 episodes	
2017	Top of the Lake	Cop Thommo	2 episodes	
2018	Rake	Mr Ahmad	1 episode	
2018	Chosen	Fixer	3 episodes	
2019	The Commons	Abel	5 episodes	
2019	Mr Inbetween	Nasir	2 episodes	
2020	Colour Blind		Miniseries	
2020	Stateless	Ahmad Ameer	6 episodes	
2022	Shantaram	Abdullah Taheri	12 episodes	
2022	Significant Others	Ali	5 episodes	
2023	The Artful Dodger	Captain Grimm	1 episode	
2023	Erotic Stories	Aldo	Episode 5: "Walking Gambit"	
2023	C*A*U*G*H*T	Director Bustard	6 episodes	
2024	Total Control	Matthew Kohli	4 episodes	
2024	Prosper	Samir	1 episode	
2024	The Twelve	Jude Persand	8 episodes	
2024	Bump	Boyd	Season 5, episode 1 (guest)	

=== Film/Shorts ===
Year	Title	Role	Notes
2004	Halfway House	Barmaid	Short
2006	Emulsion	Taxi Driver	
2006	Geoffrey Bagel	Thug 1	
2008	Wireless	Maurice	Video
2009	Fallen	Jerry	Short
2009	Cedar Boys	Assad	
2009	Street Angel	Drug Dealer	Short
2010	Rainbow Renegades	George	Short
2012	Simpleton	Anthony	Short
2013	Refuge	Sayad	Short
2016	Down Under	D-Mac	
2017	6 Days	Makki	
2018	The Merger	Sayyid	
2018	Peter Rabbit	Mr. Tod	Voice
2020	Measure for Measure	Farouk	
2020	We're Not Here to Fuck Spiders	Ahmed	
2022	Mother Mountain	Dean	
2022	Black Site	Rashid Nassar	
2023	Late Night with the Devil	Christou	
2024	The Correspondent	Mansour	
2024	How to Make Gravy	Roy	

== Theatre ==
=== As actor ===
Year	Title	Role	Notes
2004	Instant Karma	Joe Inkle	Darlinghurst Theatre, Sydney
2004	This Blasted Earth / A Christmas Miracle With Music	John Lafayette	Old Fitzroy Theatre, Sydney with Tamarama Rock Surfers
	Love, Madness & Poetry		
2005	The Savage Parade	Death	Red Star Dog Fish Productions
2005	Queen Lear	Gower	CUT Theatre
2005	The Key to the Mystic Halls of Time		Newtown Theatre, Sydney with Short+Sweet
2005	To the Green Fields Beyond	Lion	Tamarama Rock Surfers
2005	Cross Sections	Connor / Mohammad	Old Fitzroy Theatre, Sydney, Sydney Opera House
2006	Lord of the Flies	Bill	Stables Theatre, Sydney
2007	Verbatim		Newtown Theatre, Sydney with Fuzzbusters & Short+Sweet
2008	All the Blood and All the Water	Angel	Casula Powerhouse, Lennox Theatre, Parramatta with Riverside Productions
2008	Poster Girl	Prakash Larda	Old Fitzroy Theatre, Sydney with Tamarama Rock Surfers
2009	Don Juan in Soho	Pete / Vagabomd	New Theatre, Sydney
2010	The Pigeons	Dr Erich Asendorf	Stables Theatre, Sydney with Griffin Theatre Company
2010; 2011	Woyzeck	Andres	Belvoir Street Theatre, Sydney, Sue Benner Theatre, Brisbane
2010	Redemption	Quill	Drama Queen / Different Corner
2011	Sprout	John	Tamarama Rock Surfers
2011	I Only Came to Use the Phone	Herculina	Darlinghurst Theatre, Sydney
2011	K.I.J.E.	Konrad	Old Fitzroy Theatre, Woolloomooloo with Tamarama Rock Surfers
2012; 2013; 2014	Food	Hakan	Australian national tour with Force Majeure
2013	The Other Way	David	with STC
2013	The Motherf**cker with the Hat	Adam Mitchell	Studio Underground, Perth with Black Swan Theatre Company
2013	A Beautiful Lie	Ahmad	Riverside Theatres Parramatta
2013	Empire: Terror on the High Seas		Bondi Pavilion, Sydney with Tamarama Rock Surfers
2014	The Government Inspector		Belvoir Street Theatre, Sydney, Malthouse Theatre, Melbourne
2014	Dust		Heath Ledger Theatre, Perth
2015	Timeshare	Gary / Juan Fernando	Malthouse Theatre, Melbourne
2015	Ivanov	Borkin	Belvoir Street Theatre, Sydney
2016	Back at the Dojo	Jerry	Belvoir Street Theatre, Sydney
2017	The Merchant of Venice	Gratiano	Australian national tour with Bell Shakespeare
2018	Sami in Paradise	Abu Walid	Belvoir Street Theatre, Sydney (also adaptor)
2018	Good Cook. Friendly. Clean.	Character B	Stables Theatre, Sydney with Griffin Theatre Company
2018	Blasted	The Soldier	Malthouse Theatre, Melbourne
2019	Mary Stuart	Mortimer	Roslyn Packer Theatre, Sydney with STC
2020	The Deep Blue Sea	Freddie Page	Roslyn Packer Theatre, Sydney with STC
2021	Queen Fatima	Gada	National Theatre of Parramatta, Sydney Festival
2024	Much Ado About Nothing	Benedick	MTC

=== As crew ===
Year	Title	Role	Notes
2006	Pork	Director	Newtown Theatre, Sydney with Short+Sweet
2018	Sami in Paradise	Adaptor	Belvoir Street Theatre, Sydney
2019; 2011	The Appleton Ladies' Potato Race	Dialect coach	Ensemble Theatre, Sydney & regional tour
