= Ella Scott Lynch =

Australian actor (active 1985– )

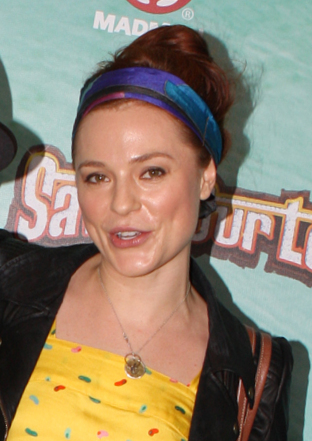
- Ella Scott Lynch (2013)
- Born: Ella Scott Lynch; Sydney, New South Wales, Australia
- Education: National Institute of Dramatic Art (BFA)
- Years active: 1985–present
- Children: 2

Ella Scott Lynch is an Australian actor. Her notable roles include as lawyer Erin O'Shaughnessy in Crownies and its sequel Janet King, Shirley Ryan in the series Love Child, and Melbourne gangland barrister Nicola Gobbo in the Channel Nine mini-series Informer 3838.

== Early life and education ==
Ella Scott Lynch was born in Sydney's inner western suburbs, to arts executive Michael Lynch and Oscar-nominated film producer, Jane Scott. She attended St Catherine's School, Waverley, in Sydney. While having previously worked on some of her mother's films, it wasn't until after she completed high school, and spent a gap year travelling, that she realised she wanted to pursue acting as a career.

Lynch studied a Bachelor of Dramatic Art in Acting at National Institute of Dramatic Art (NIDA), graduating in 2004.

== Career ==
In 2005, immediately after graduating from NIDA, Lynch was cast in long-running soap opera Home and Away in the role of Hayley Lawson (previously played by Bec Cartwright), which she played until the end of the 2005 season.

In 2008, Lynch was cast as a regular in All Saints. Her character, nurse Claire Anderson, replaced Jolene Anderson's character Erika. Coincidentally, Kip Gamblin, who played Hayley's love interest Scott Hunter in Home and Away, also joined All Saints at that point. She played the role for two seasons, through 2009.

Lynch had a main role in legal drama series Crownies, in 2011, playing Erin O'Shaughnessy. She followed this with a main role as Senior Constable Camille Alavoine in Underbelly: Badness, the 2012 fifth season of underworld crime series Underbelly. In 2014, she reprised her role as Erin O'Shaughnessy in Janet King, a spin-off of Crownies.

From 2014 to 2016, Lynch had a main role in the first three seasons of drama series Love Child, playing Shirley Ryan, amongst an ensemble cast including Jessica Marais, Mandy McElhinney, Miranda Tapsell, Jonathan LaPaglia and Matthew Le Nevez. In 2016, she played photojournalist Meg Flynn in the second season of drama series The Code. That same year, she appeared in miniseries Brock, based on the life of motor racing driver Peter Brock, playing the role of Bev Brock, alongside Matthew Le Nevez.

Lynch made her second appearance in the Underbelly franchise in 2018, playing Mark "Chopper" Read's second wife, Margaret Cassar in Underbelly Files: Chopper, opposite Aaron Jeffery. Lynch next took on the dual lead roles of Rachel and Sarah in 'psychosexual thriller' feature Pimped, opposite Benedict Samuel. The film had its world premiere at London's FrightFest in 2018, before its Australian premiere at Monster Fest VII the following year.

In 2019, Lynch appeared in the film Standing up for Sunny, alongside Breaking Bad's RJ Mitte and Philippa Northeast, playing Felicity. Beginning in 2019, she also began playing the recurring role of Suzie Flynn, alongside Tim Minchin and Milly Alcock in comedy drama series, Upright, continuing through to the second season in 2022.

In 2020, Lynch starred in her third Underbelly spin-off, Informer 3838 as the titular character, Melbourne gangland lawyer Nicola Gobbo. The miniseries was inspired by the real-life career of Gobbo, who was recruited by Victoria Police in the 1990s as an informer on crime figures, such as drug kingpin Tony Mokbel.

2025 saw Lynch play Doctor Nina Hirsch in the second season of crime drama series Black Snow, alongside Travis Fimmel.

== Personal life ==
Lynch's former partner is actor Toby Schmitz. They share a daughter, who was born in May 2016.

On 15 June 2021, Lynch welcomed her second child, a boy, with partner Steve Toulmin.

== Filmography ==
=== Film ===
Year	Title	Role	Notes	Ref.
1996	Shine	Jessica		
2006	Emulsion			
2006	Charlotte's Web	Girl at Fair	Scene cut	
2008	Monkey Puzzle (aka Enter the Wild)	Pippa		
2008	Rope Burn	Bella	Short film	
2012	Inhuman Resources (aka Redd Inc)	Female Secretary		
2013	Fruit	Isobel	Short film	
2016	The Lake	Actress	Short film	
2018	Pimped	Sarah Montrose / Rachael Montrose		
2019	Standing Up for Sunny	Felicity		
2023	The Trial	Joan	Short film	
2023	I've Got You	Elizabeth	Short film	
2024	Unspoken	Alice	Short film	

=== Television ===
Year	Title	Role	Notes	Ref
1985	Winners	Doyle Family Member	Episode: "Top Kid"	
2005	Home and Away	Hayley Lawson	Regular role (Season 18)	
2005	All Saints	Shauna Lapin	Episode: "New Beginnings"	
2006	The Silence	Lilya	TV film	
2008	Emerald Falls	Blossom Piggot	TV film	
2008	Pink Dragon	Flick	TV film	
2008–2009	All Saints	Claire Anderson	Main role (seasons 11–12)	
2011	City Homicide	Narelle O'Brien	Season 4, episode: "No Greater Honour: Tangled Web"	
2011	Crownies	Erin O'Shaughnessy	Main role	
2012	Underbelly: Badness	Snr Constable Camille Alavoine	Main role	
2013	Mr & Mrs Murder	Emily Gorman	Episode: "Keeping Up Appearances"	
2013	Serangoon Road	Angelica Warnock	3 episodes	
2014	Janet King	Erin O'Shaughnessy	Main role (season 1)	
2014–2016	Love Child	Shirley Ryan	Main role (seasons 1–3)	
2015	NCIS: Los Angeles	Dr. Karen Ward	Episode: "Spiral"	
2015	Miss Fisher's Murder Mysteries	Angela Lombard	Season 3, episode 7: "Game, Set & Murder"	
2016	The Code	Meg Flynn	Main role (season 2)	
2016	Brock	Beverly Brock	Miniseries	
2017	Newton's Law	Lana Devries	Episode: "Control Theory"	
2017	Friday on My Mind (aka Easybeats)	Lillian Roxon	Miniseries	
2017; 2019	Doctor Doctor (aka The Heart Guy)	Celia Cartwright	2 episodes: "Both Sides Now" & "A House Divided"	
2018	Underbelly Files: Chopper	Margaret	2 episodes	
2019–2022	Upright	Suzie Flynn	Seasons 1-2, 11 episodes	
2020	Informer 3838	Nicola Gobbo	2 episodes	
2021	Amazing Grace	Christina	4 episodes	
2023	While the Men Are Away	Rita	2 episodes	
2023	Jones Family Christmas	Christina Jones	TV movie	
2025	Black Snow	Dr Nina Hirsch	Season 2	

== Theatre ==
Year	Name	Role	Theatre	Ref.
2003	Twelfth Night	Maria	NIDA, Sydney	
2004	Plasticine	Ludnila	NIDA, Sydney	
2004	Playhouse Creatures	Nell Gwynn	Theatre Royal, Hobart with NIDA, Sydney	
2004	This Blasted Earth: A Christmas Miracle With Music	Nathalie Corn-Mathews	Old Fitzroy Theatre, Sydney with Tamarama Rock Surfers	
2004	Who's Afraid of the Working Class?	Claire & Stacey	NIDA, Sydney	
2005	Jumping and All That		Old Fitzroy Theatre, Sydney with Tamarama Rock Surfers	
2005	Love Letters	Melissa Gardner	NIDA Parade Theatre, Sydney	
2006	Constance Drinkwater and the Final Days of Somerset	Hope	Stables Theatre, Sydney with Griffin Theatre Co / Tamarama Rock Surfers	
2007	Capture the Flag	Mathilde	Old Fitzroy Theatre, Sydney with Tamarama Rock Surfers	
2013	Empire: Terror on the High Seas	Nicole Hertz- Hollingsworth	Bondi Pavilion, Sydney with Tamarama Rock Surfers	
2018	King of Pigs	Lead role	Old Fitzroy Theatre, Sydney with Red Line Productions	
2019	The Astral Plane	Master Wanda	Belvoir Theatre, Sydney	
2025	Betrayal	Emma	Old Fitzroy Theatre, Sydney with Sport for Jove	

== Awards and nominations ==
Year	Work	Award	Category	Result	Ref.
2011	Crownies	Equity Ensemble Awards	Most Outstanding Performance by an Ensemble in a Drama Series	Nominated	
2012	Underbelly: Badness	Equity Ensemble Awards	Most Outstanding Performance by an Ensemble in a Miniseries or Telemovie	Nominated	
2018	King of Pigs	Sydney Theatre Awards	Best Female Actor in a Leading Role in an Independent Production	Nominated	
