= Toby Schmitz =

Australian actor and playwright

- Born: 4 May 1977 (age 49); Perth, Western Australia
- Education: University of Western Australia; National Institute of Dramatic Art (BFA)
- Occupations: Actor and playwright
- Children: 1

Toby Schmitz (born 4 May 1977) is an Australian actor, playwright, director and novelist.

== Early life ==
Schmitz was born in Perth, Western Australia, where he was raised in the suburb of Swanbourne, the elder of two brothers. He attended Perth's Scotch College, where he performed in a school production of Seven Brides for Seven Brothers.

At the age of 15, Schmitz met comic performer Tim Minchin at Midnite Youth Theatre Company, where they first performed together in a production of The Wind in the Willows in 1992. They both then moved on to study at University of Western Australia, where Schmitz briefly studied law. While at university, Schmitz and Minchin hosted a cabaret show, performing Beat poems and Beatles medleys.

Schmitz then went on to study acting at National Institute of Dramatic Art, graduating in 1999.

== Career ==
=== Theatre ===
Schmitz has performed in numerous stage productions for Sydney Theatre Company, Company B at Belvoir St Theatre and Griffin Theatre Company. His STC credits include The School for Scandal directed by Judy Davis and the premiere and national tour of David Williamson's The Great Man directed by Robyn Nevin. He has also had leading roles in George Bernard Shaw's Major Barbara, Andrew Upton's Hanging Man, Tony McNamara's The Great, Nina Raine's Rabbit and Tom Stoppard's Travesties. Several of these productions toured interstate.

Schmitz appeared in the 2000 premiere of Brendan Cowell's Men for Rogue Star Productions at Sydney's Old Fitzroy Theatre. Cowell, on the search for a “suave and cocky” actor, cast Schmitz in the play after encountering him at an STC audition, marking the beginning of regular collaborations, including Schmitz appearing in a lead role in Cowell's Self Esteem in 2007 and playing the title role in Ruben Guthrie for Company B in 2008 and 2009.

For Griffin Theatre Company, Schmitz played the central role of Luke Boyce in Louis Nowra's The Boyce Trilogy – The Woman with Dog's Eyes (2004), The Marvellous Boy (2005) and The Emperor of Sydney (2006), all directed by David Berthold.

In 2009, Schmitz played the role of Coleman in The Lonesome West at Belvoir. He then played the eponymous character Hamlet in the successful 2010 La Boite Theatre production in Brisbane, directed by David Berthold.

Schmitz played the lead role of Elyot Chase in Noël Coward's Private Lives, to packed audiences in Sydney and Canberra in 2012. The same year, he appeared in Strange Interlude, before once again playing the title role in Hamlet in 2013. That same year, he appeared opposite Tim Minchin in a Sydney Theatre Company production of Rosencrantz and Guildenstern Are Dead. The pair had previously appeared together in a 1996 university production of the play, albeit in minor roles.

In 2015, Schmitz appeared in Andrew Upton's adaptation of Chekhov's play Platonov, titled The Present, for Sydney Theatre Company, opposite Cate Blanchett, Jacqueline McKenzie, Marshall Napier and Richard Roxburgh. In 2016, the production moved to the Ethel Barrymore Theatre in New York City for the Broadway debut of Schmitz and the rest of the cast.

In 2022, Schmitz took on the role of Benedick in Bell Shakespeare's Much Ado About Nothing. Later that year and into 2023, he began playing Emperor Joseph II, alongside Michael Sheen as Salieri, in a production of Amadeus at the Sydney Opera House. For one performance in January, he played the role of Salieri.

Schmitz played the dual roles of Dad and Crow in his adaptation of Grief Is the Thing with Feathers for Belvoir. It won awards for Best New Australian Work and Best Mainstage Production at the Sydney Theatre Awards. while Schmitz was also nominated for Best Performance in a Leading Role in a Mainstage Production. In February 2026, Schmitz began appearing opposite Damon Herriman and Richard Roxburgh, as Yvan in the comic Yasmina Reza play Art, for a national tour.

=== Television ===
Schmitz's first television appearance was in the drama series Sweat in 1996, playing the role of Cameron, opposite Heath Ledger and Martin Henderson.

Beginning in 2004, Schmitz had a lead role as Gabe Francobelli in short-lived series The Cooks. In 2010, he scored a role in the Steven Spielberg/Tom Hanks-produced war drama miniseries The Pacific.

In 2011, Schmitz appeared in the third instalment of the Underbelly Files series of telemovies, titled The Man Who Got Away, portraying the lead role of notorious drug smuggler and organised crime figurehead David McMillan. The same year, he played the part of Barry Humphries, opposite Asher Keddie as Ita Buttrose, in two-part miniseries Paper Giants: The Birth of Cleo. Schmitz then teamed up with Angus Sampson in 2012, for Season 1 of the Australian word game Randling, hosted by Andrew Denton on ABC1.

In 2014, Schmitz joined an ensemble cast in Starz American action-adventure series Black Sails, as historical pirate John Rackham. The series was written to be a prequel to Robert Louis Stevenson's 1883 novel Treasure Island. He played the role for all four seasons of the series. In 2017, he starred opposite Claudia Karvan in the ABC legal drama Newton's Law, portraying Lewis Hughes.

In 2020, Schmitz had a recurring role as John in Bloom. The same year, he was in miniseries Reckoning, playing opposite Sam Trammell and Aden Young as John Ainsworth. In 2021, he featured in Mexican horror S.O.Z. Soldados o Zombies and the following year appeared in the first season of 2022 series The Twelve, playing the role of Otto Bell.

In 2024, Schmitz played corrupt detective Tim Cotton, opposite Simon Baker, Bryan Brown, Travis Fimmel and Phoebe Tonkin in miniseries Boy Swallows Universe, based on Trent Dalton's 2018 semi-autobiographical novel of the same name.

Schmitz's other television credits include McLeod's Daughters, The Heartbreak Tour, White Collar Blue, Water Rats, Fat Cow Motel, Home and Away and Temptation.

=== Film ===
Schmitz's has also appeared in numerous films. His early roles included 2002 short film Heaven with Rose Byrne and 2003 comedy The Rage in Placid Lake opposite Ben Lee and reuniting with Byrne. In 2004, he had a minor role in romantic drama Somersault with Abbie Cornish and Sam Worthington, and played Gary opposite Matthew Newton and Ewen Leslie in Right Here Right Now, which he also co-wrote and co-produced, together with Newton.

In 2006, Schmitz played the role of Trent in Solo, opposite Colin Friels and Vince Colosimo. He then reunited with Matthew Newton and Ewen Leslie in 2008 film Three Blind Mice. The film played at numerous international film festivals and won awards including the 11th FIPRESCI International Critics Award at the London Film Festival.

In 2010, Schmitz appeared in romantic superhero comedy/drama film Griff the Invisible opposite Ryan Kwanten. The following year he played lead character and narrator Goodchild in LBF (an acronym for 'Living Between Fucks').

=== Writing and directing ===
Schmitz is also a playwright. After a solid grounding in writing revue and stand-up comedy at university in Perth, Schmitz wrote his first play, dreamalittledreamalittle, while studying acting at NIDA. It was presented there in 1998 and was later restaged at Belvoir St Theatre.

In 2000, Schmitz directed a production of Howard Korder's Boys' Life at Sydney's Bondi Pavilion for the Sydney Fringe Festival.

In 2002, Schmitz won Sydney Theatre Company's Patrick White Playwrights' Award with his play Lucky, which was later produced by the Australian Theatre for Young People. His play Chicks Will Dig You! was performed as part of Company B's 2003 B Sharp season and won the Australian National Playwrights' Centre's New Dramatists Award in 2004. It was also shortlisted for the 2003 Philip Parsons Young Playwrights Award.

Schmitz reunited with Tim Minchin in 2004, when his satirical Christmas pantomime This Blasted Earth (co-written with actor Travis Cotton) was staged at Sydney's Old Fitzroy Hotel. The same year, Australian film Right Here Right Now was released, which Schmitz co-wrote with Matthew Newton.

In 2007, Schmitz wrote and directed Capture the Flag for Tamarama Rock Surfers. He later toured a production of the play nationally with Playwriting Australia in 2011. In 2008, he directed Neil LaBute's This Is How It Goes, at Sydney's Darlinghurst Theatre, to critical acclaim. In 2012, his play I Want to Sleep with Tom Stoppard was a hit at Bondi Pavilion. The following year, Melbourne's Malthouse Theatre staged a production of The Dragon, Schmitz's adaptation of an Evgeny Schwartz fable.

Schmitz's other plays include Fifteen and Then Some, Pan, Cunt Pi, and A Christmas Miracle with Music. His play Grazing the Phosphorus was commissioned by the National Institute of Dramatic Art.

In 2017, Schmitz directed the premiere of Louis Nowra's This Much is True at Sydney's Old Fitz Theatre to critical acclaim. In 2025, together with Cowell and Ewen Leslie, Schmitz devised and starred in Hamlet Camp at Carriageworks, a play exploring the 'baggage' of actors who have played Hamlet. The same year, he adapted a production of Grief Is the Thing with Feathers together with Simon Phillips for Belvoir.

Schmitz's first novel, The Empress Murders, was published by Allen & Unwin in 2025.

== Personal life ==
Schmitz's former partner is actress Ella Scott Lynch. They share a daughter who was born in May 2016.

== Filmography ==
=== Film ===
Year	Title	Role	Notes
2002	Heaven		Short film
2003	The Rage in Placid Lake	Bull	
2004	Somersault	John	
2004	Right Here Right Now	Gary	Also co-writer / co-producer
2006	Solo	Trent	
2006	Emulsion		
2007	My Last Ten Hours with You	Mark	Short film
2007	The Heist	Justin	Short film
2008	Three Blind Mice	Dean Lieberman	
2009	Agoraphobia in the Desert of the Real	Sebastian	Short film
2010	Griff the Invisible	Tony	
2010	After the Credits	Kyle	Short film
2011	LBF	Goodchild	
2012	Almost	Alfie	Short film
2013	Chicom	Geoff	Short film
2016	Perry	Perry	Short film
2018	Book Week	Rob	
TBA	Ariadne's Thread	Michael 'Doc' Welles	In development

=== Television ===
Year	Title	Role	Notes
1996	Sweat	Cameron	3 episodes
2000	Home and Away	Charlie Nicholas	2 episodes
2000	Water Rats	Nathan Albury	1 episode
2001	Life Support		1 episode
2002; 2003	White Collar Blue	Dirk Eikmeier	2 episodes
2003	Fat Cow Motel	Toby Meares	Miniseries, 2 episodes
2003	Temptation	Gabriel Francobelli	TV movie
2004–2005	The Cooks	Gabriel Francobelli	13 episodes
2005	Heartbreak Tour	Ryan	TV movie
2008	McLeod's Daughters	Scott Johnson	2 episodes
2010	The Pacific	Captain Burns Lee	Miniseries, 1 episode
2010	City Homicide	Adrian Farrell	1 episode
2011	Underbelly Files: The Man Who Got Away	David McMillan	TV movie
2011	Paper Giants: The Birth of Cleo	Barry Humphries	Miniseries, 2 episodes
2011	Spirited	Scott	1 episode
2011	Crownies	Detective Dylan Thorne	5 episodes
2012	Miss Fisher's Murder Mysteries	Charles Freeman	1 episode
2017	Newton's Law	Lewis Hughes QC	Miniseries, 8 episodes
2014–2017	Black Sails	Jack Rackham	37 episodes
2017	Blue Murder: Killer Cop	Internal Affairs Detective Jed Wilson	Miniseries, 1 episode
2019	Reef Break	Leo Murphy	1 episode
2020	Black Comedy	Guest cast	1 episode
2020	Bloom	John	6 episodes
2020	Reckoning	John Ainsworth	Miniseries, 7 episodes
2021	S.O.Z. Soldados o Zombies	Agustus Snowman	8 episodes
2021	Preppers	Brody	1 episode
2022	Dota: Dragon’s Blood	Emperor Shabarra (voice)	Animated series, 5 episodes
2022	The Twelve	Otto Bell	Season 1, 4 episodes
2024	Boy Swallows Universe	Detective Tim Cotton	Miniseries, 5 episodes
2026	The Artful Dodger	Ludwig Leichhardt	1 episode
2026	The F Ward	Dennis	TV series

=== Video game ===
Year	Title	Role	Notes
2000	Warlords Battlecry	Voice	Video game

== Theatre ==
=== As actor ===
Year	Title	Role	Notes	Ref.
1992	The Wind in the Willows	Ferret	Midnite Youth Theatre Co	
1994	The Birds		His Majesty's Theatre, Perth	
1996	Rosencrantz and Guildenstern are Dead	Hamlet	University of Western Australia	
1997	The Father We Loved on a Beach by the Sea	Foreman / Dan	NIDA Parade Theatre, Sydney	
1998	Being Friends / Touched	Eric / Keith	NIDA Parade Theatre, Sydney with Midnite Theatre Co	
1998	A Cry from the City of Virgins		NIDA Parade Theatre, Sydney	
1998	Measure for Measure	Angelo	NIDA Parade Theatre, Sydney	
1998	A Chaste Maid in Cheapside (or Carry on Chaste Maid)	Servant / Gossip / Waterman / Nurse	NIDA Parade Theatre, Sydney	
1999	Twelve Angry Men	Juror # 2	NIDA Parade Theatre, Sydney	
1999	The Imaginary Invalid	Thomas Diafoirus	NIDA Parade Theatre, Sydney	
1999	The Libertine	Rochester	NIDA Parade Theatre, Sydney	
2000	The Great Man	Adam	Playhouse, Brisbane, Playhouse, Melbourne with STC & QTC	
2000	Men	Jules	Old Fitzroy Hotel, Sydney	
2001	Turnstiler	E109	Stables Theatre, Sydney with Griffin Theatre Co	
2001	The School for Scandal	Charles	Sydney Opera House with STC	
2002	Howie the Rookie		Belvoir, Sydney	
2002	Hanging Man	Robert	Wharf Theatre, Sydney with STC	
2003	Major Barbara	Stephen Undershaft	NIDA Parade Theatre, Sydney with STC	
2003	Black Milk		Belvoir, Sydney	
2004	Ladybird		Belvoir, Sydney	
2004	The Woman with Dog's Eyes	Luke Boyce	Stables Theatre, Sydney with Griffin Theatre Co	
2005	Her Master’s Voice		Belvoir, Sydney	
2005	Cunt Pi	Sam / Eric	Old Fitzroy Hotel, Sydney with Tamarama Rock Surfers	
2005	The Marvellous Boy	Luke Boyce	Stables Theatre, Sydney with Griffin Theatre Co	
2006	The Emperor of Sydney	Luke Boyce	Stables Theatre, Sydney with Griffin Theatre Co	
2006	Under Ice		Wharf Theatre, Sydney	
2006	15 and Then Some		East Village Hotel, Sydney	
2007	Self-Esteem	Chad	Wharf Theatre, Sydney with STC	
2008	Rabbit	Richard	Wharf Theatre, Sydney with STC	
2008	The Great	Peter / Didi	Wharf Theatre, Sydney with STC	
2008–2009	Ruben Guthrie	Ruben Guthrie	Belvoir, Sydney	
2009	The Lonesome West	Coleman	Belvoir, Sydney	
2009	Travesties	Tristin Tzara	Sydney Opera House with STC	
2010	Hamlet	Hamlet	Roundhouse Theatre, Brisbane with La Boite	
2010	Thyestes	Atreus	Malthouse Theatre, Melbourne with Belvoir	
2010	Measure for Measure	Lucio	Belvoir, Sydney	
2011	Much Ado About Nothing	Benedick	Sydney Opera House, Playhouse, Canberra, Playhouse, Melbourne with Bell Shakespeare	
2011	The Importance of Being Earnest	Earnest	Southbank Theatre, Melbourne with MTC	
2011–2012	The Wild Duck	Gregers Werle	Belvoir, Sydney, Malthouse Theatre, Melbourne, Nationaltheatret, Oslo with Belvoir	
2012	Strange Interlude	Ned Darrell	Belvoir, Sydney	
2012	Private Lives	Elyot Chase	Belvoir, Sydney	
2013	The Dragon		Malthouse Theatre, Melbourne	
2013	Rosencrantz and Guildenstern are Dead	Guildenstern	STC	
2013	Hamlet	Hamlet	Belvoir, Sydney	
2014; 2018	Thyestes	Atreus	Belvoir, Space Theatre, Adelaide	
2015; 2016	The Present	Mikhail (understudy) / Nikolai	STC, Ethel Barrymore Theatre, New York	
2017	The Rover	Willmore	Belvoir, Sydney	
2018	Wild	Man	Southbank Theatre, Melbourne with MTC	
2018	The Dance of Death	Kurt	Belvoir, Sydney	
2018	Degenerate Art	Joseph Goebbels	Old Fitz Theatre, Sydney with Red Line Productions	
2018	Toby Schmitz Live	Solo show	Old Fitz Theatre, Sydney with Red Line Productions	
2019	The Real Thing		Sydney Opera House with STC	
2019	The Beauty Queen of Leenane		Roslyn Packer Theatre, Sydney with STC	
2020	The Writer		Dunstan Playhouse, Adelaide with STCSA & STC	
2020	Thom Pain (based on nothing)	Thom Pain	Online with Red Line Productions	
2022	In a Nutshell		Neilson Nutshell, Sydney with Bell Shakespeare	
2022	Much Ado About Nothing	Benedick	Bell Shakespeare	
2022–2023	Amadeus	Emperor Joseph II / Salieri	Sydney Opera House with Red Line Productions	
2023	The Seagull	Boris	Roslyn Packer Theatre, Sydney with STC	
2024	Gaslight	Jack	Comedy Theatre, Melbourne with QTC	
2025	Grief is the Thing with Feathers	Dad / Crow	Belvoir, Sydney	
2026	Hamlet Camp	Hamlet / various	Carriageworks, Sydney	
2026	Art	Yvan	Roslyn Packer Theatre, Sydney, Playhouse, Brisbane with STCSA	

=== As director / writer ===
Year	Title	Role	Notes	Ref.
1998	dreamalittledreamalittle	Playwright	NIDA Parade Theatre, Sydney	
2000	dreamalittledreamalittle	Playwright	Belvoir, Sydney	
2000	Boys' Life	Director	Bondi Pavilion, Sydney for Sydney Fringe Festival	
	Grazing the Phosphorus	Playwright	NIDA	
2002	Lucky	Playwright	Wharf Theatre, Sydney with ATYP	
2003	Chicks Will Dig You!	Playwright	Belvoir, Sydney	
2004	One: Your Body Belongs to Your Nation	Playwright	Newtown Theatre, Sydney for Short+Sweet	
2004	This Blasted Earth	Co-writer	Old Fitzroy Hotel, Sydney	
2005	Fifteen and Then Some	Playwright	Old Fitzroy Hotel, Sydney	
2005	Lucky	Playwright	La Mama, Melbourne	
2005	Cunt Pi	Playwrighf	Old Fitzroy Hotel, Sydney with Tamarama Rock Surfers	
2006	Plays: By Himself	Director	Old Fitzroy Hotel, Sydney with Tamarama Rock Surfers	
2006	15 and Then Some	Playwright / Director	East Village Hotel, Sydney	
2006	Pan	Playwright	Seymour Centre, Sydney with B Sharp	
2007	Chicks Will Dig You!	Playwright	Blue Room Theatre, Perth with Capgun Productions	
2007	Shane Warne: The Musical	Script Developer		
2007; 2011	Capture the Flag	Playwright / Director	Old Fitzroy Hotel, Sydney with Tamarama Rock Surfers & Australian regional tour with Playwriting Australia	
2008	This Is How It Goes	Director	Darlinghurst Theatre, Sydney	
2009	Sydney Ghost Stories: The Point of the Story	Playwright	Old Fitzroy Hotel, Sydney with Tamarama Rock Surfers	
2012	Pygmalion	Dramaturge	STC	
2012	I Want to Sleep with Tom Stoppard	Playwright	Bondi Pavilion, Sydney	
2013	Empire: Terror on the High Seas	Playwright	Bondi Pavilion, Sydney with Tamarama Rock Surfers	
2013	The Dragon	Adaptor	Malthouse Theatre, Melbourne	
2014; 2016	Howie the Rookie	Director	Old Fitzroy Hotel, Sydney with Red Line Productions	
2015	Shakespearialism	Director	Old Fitzroy Hotel, Sydney with Red Line Productions	
2017	This Much is True	Director	Old Fitzroy Hotel, Sydney, Riverside Theatres Parramatta with Red Line Productions	
2018	Degenerate Art	Playwright / Director	Old Fitz Theatre, Sydney with Red Line Productions	
2020	Thom Pain (based on nothing)	Director	Online with Red Line Productions	
2025	Grief is the Thing with Feathers	Co-Adaptor	Belvoir, Sydney	
2026	Hamlet Camp	Writer	Carriageworks, Sydney	

== Awards and nominations ==
Year	Work	Award	Category	Result	Ref.
2002	Lucky	Sydney Theatre Company	Patrick White Playwrights' Award	Won	
2003	Chicks Will Dig You!	NSW Philip Parsons Fellowship for Emerging Playwrights	Young Playwright's Award	Shortlisted	
2004	Chicks Will Dig You!	Australian National Playwrights Centre	New Dramatists Award	Won	
2008	The Great	Sydney Theatre Awards	Best Actor in a Supporting Role	Nominated	
2008	Ruben Guthrie	Sydney Theatre Awards	Best Actor in a Lead Role	Nominated	
2010	Measure for Measure	Sydney Theatre Awards	Best Actor in a Supporting Role	Nominated	
2010	Ruben Guthrie	Helpmann Awards	Best Male Actor in a Play	Nominated	
2011	Much Ado About Nothing	Helpmann Awards	Best Male Actor in a Play	Nominated	
2011	Much Ado About Nothing	Sydney Theatre Awards	Best Actor in a Leading Role of a Mainstage production	Nominated	
2011	Body of Work	Green Room Awards	Best Male Actor	Nominated	
2012	I Want To Sleep With Tom Stoppard	Sydney Theatre Awards	Best New Australian Work	Shortlisted	
2014	Howie the Rookie	Sydney Theatre Awards	Best Direction of an Independent Production	Nominated	
2018	Thyestes	Helpmann Awards	Best Male Actor in a Play	Nominated	
2019	Degenerate Art	AWGIE Awards	Stage Award	Nominated	
2023	The Seagull	Sydney Theatre Awards	Best Performance in a Supporting Role in a Mainstage Production	Nominated	
2025	Grief is the Thing with Feathers	Sydney Theatre Awards	Best New Australian Work	Won	
2025	Grief is the Thing with Feathers	Sydney Theatre Awards	Best Mainstage Production	Won	
2025	Grief is the Thing with Feathers	Sydney Theatre Awards	Best Performance in a Leading Role in a Mainstage Production	Nominated	
