= Henry Nixon =

Australian actor (active 2001– )

- Born: Surry Hills, New South Wales, Australia
- Education: Canberra Grammar School; Narrabundah College; Australian National University; NIDA (2000)
- Occupation: Actor
- Years active: 2001–present
- Known for: Don’t Blame the Koalas; All Saints

Henry Nixon is an Australian actor. His notable roles include, Don't Blame the Koalas as Chris King and All Saints as Sterling 'Sterlo' McCormack.

== Early life ==
Nixon was born at St Margaret's Hospital in the inner-Sydney suburb of Surry Hills. As a child, he lived in Elanora Heights, Paddington, and Wollstonecraft in Sydney with his father, Gerald Nixon, a recording engineer, and his mother, Vanessa, a nurse. After their divorce, Nixon relocated (with his mother and stepfather) from Sydney to the Burra Valley, near Canberra. He was educated in Canberra at AME School, Red Hill Primary, Canberra Grammar School and then Narrabundah College, where he studied drama.

Nixon graduated from the Australian National University with an Arts degree, majoring in anthropology, sociology, and English, before deciding to pursue an acting career. He auditioned for WAAPA, VCA, and Sydney's National Institute of Dramatic Art (NIDA). He was accepted into all three but ultimately attended NIDA, graduating with Bachelor of Dramatic Art (Acting) in 2000.

== Career ==
Since graduating from NIDA in 2000, Nixon has worked extensively in film, television, and theatre. In 2002, he played the character Chris King in children's series Don't Blame Me (known in the UK as Don't Blame the Koalas). From 2003 to 2004, he landed a regular role in long-running Australian hospital drama All Saints, as Sterling 'Sterlo' McCormack.

In 2004, Nixon appeared in coming-of-age drama film Somersault with Abbie Cornish and Sam Worthington. Then in 2006, he played the role of Nigel in horror film Safety in Numbers, before appearing in Matthew Saville's 2007 drama-thriller Noise with Brendan Cowell. Further film roles followed with The Black Balloon in 2008, in which he portrayed a social worker opposite Toni Collette and 2009 horror film Triangle, playing Downey, alongside Melissa George, Liam Hemsworth and Michael Dorman.

After being flown to Los Angeles to audition for Tom Hanks and Steven Spielberg for 2010 American war drama miniseries The Pacific, Nixon landed the role of 1st LT Hugh Corrigan. He had originally auditioned for the lead role of Robert Leckie, which was instead played by James Badge Dale. That same year he had a recurring guest role in dance drama series Dance Academy.

In 2011, Nixon then had a role in Julia Leigh's erotic psychological drama film Sleeping Beauty, alongside Emily Browning, as well as the TV movie Underbelly Files: Infiltration, part of the Underbelly franchise. The following year he appeared in the miniseries Devil's Dust in the role of Bob Debus, comedy film Scumbus, alongside Glenn Robbins and Ryan Shelton and drama film Being Venice with Garry McDonald.

A recurring guest role as Bryn Parry in Packed to the Rafters followed in 2013, as well as the ongoing role of Jonah Ellroy in crime-comedy series Mr & Mrs Murder, opposite Shaun Micallef and Kat Stewart. Then in 2014, he played the lead character of Jef in YouTube comedy series Low Life. The following year, he appeared in sci-fi drama film Terminus.

Nixon played the role of Snr Constable Fergus McFadden in sci-fi miniseries The Kettering Incident in 2016, for which he received the coveted Silver Logie for Most Outstanding Actor at the 2017 Logie Awards. The series aired internationally, giving Nixon exposure in the US, where he was based for a while. This helped him land a guest role in American series NCIS.

Nixon then appeared alongside Matthew Le Nevez and Brendan Cowell as Shane Barry, in 2016 two-part biographical miniseries Brock, about motor racing legend Peter Brock. Nixon was cast in the role of Andrew Payne, alongside Teresa Palmer and Sam Neill in 2019 sports drama Ride Like a Girl, telling the story of Michelle Payne, the first female jockey to win the Melbourne Cup.

In 2020, Nixon appeared opposite Jessica De Gouw and Ewen Leslie in comedy-drama miniseries Operation Buffalo, as Agent Whickler. This was followed by a role in 2021 ABC psychological mystery miniseries Wakefield with Dan Wyllie, Harriet Dyer and Mandy McElhinney. He then had a recurring role in The Secrets She Keeps as Governor Terence Ulrich in 2021. In 2023 he played Nigel Bolt in Paramount+ crime series Last King of the Cross and Andrew Irving in children's series The PM's Daughter.

Nixon next appeared in 2024 Binge/Foxtel mystery drama series High Country with Leah Purcell. That same year, he had a role in horror film The Moogai, followed by a part in 2025 sci-fi-horror war film Primitive War, featuring opposite Ryan Kwanten and Jeremy Piven.

Nixon also took over as narrator for the 2025 fifth season of The Dog House Australia, the series having previously been narrated by Chris Brown, followed by Mark Coles Smith. As a voice-over artist, he has also voiced major campaigns for Mitsubishi, McDonald's, Nissan, IGA and NIB.

== Personal life ==
Nixon divides his time between Sydney, Australia, and Los Angeles, California. He is a keen skipper and outdoor enthusiast.

== Acting credits ==
=== Television ===
Year	Title	Role	Notes	Ref.
2001; 2005–2006	McLeod's Daughters	Bruce Barry / Greg Dawson	6 episodes	
2002	The Lost World	Bartholomew Thorne	1 episode	
2002	Home and Away	Steve McLaren	1 episode	
2002–2003	Don't Blame the Koalas	Chris King	26 episodes	
2003–2004	All Saints	Sterling 'Sterlo' McCormack	52 episodes	
2009	East West 101	Jake Santor	1 episode	
2010	The Pacific	1st LT Hugh Corrigan	Miniseries, 3 episodes	
2010	Dance Academy	James – Legal Aid Lawyer	2 episodes	
2011	Underbelly Files: Infiltration	Leigh	TV movie	
2012	Event Zero	Egan	Web series, 1 episode	
2012	Devil's Dust	Bob Debus	Miniseries, 2 episodes	
2013	Packed to the Rafters	Bryn Parry	4 episodes	
2013	Mr & Mrs Murder	Jonah Ellroy	13 episodes	
2014	Low Life	Jef	6 episodes	
2016	Rake	Sgt Billy James	1 episode	
2016	The Kettering Incident	Fergus McFadden	8 episodes	
2016	Brock	Shane Berry	Miniseries, 2 episodes	
2016	NCIS	Mason Finley	1 episode	
2019	Mr Inbetween	Tim	1 episode	
2020	Operation Buffalo	Agent Whickler	Miniseries, 1 episode	
2021	Wakefield	David	Miniseries, 5 episodes	
2022	The Secrets She Keeps	Governor Terence Ulrich	5 episodes	
2023	Last King of the Cross	Nigel Bolt	2 episodes	
2023	The PM's Daughter	Andrew Irving	2 episodes	
2024	High Country	Damien Stark	7 episodes	
2025	NCIS: Sydney	Detective Senior Constable Ed Pickering	1 episode	
2025–	The Dog House Australia	Narrator	Season 5 onward	

=== Film ===
Year	Title	Role	Notes	Ref.
2004	Somersault	Nick		
2006	Safety in Numbers	Nigel		
2006	Happy Feet	Live-action cast	Animated film	
2007	Noise	Craig Finlay		
2007	Feeling_Lonely?	Drew	Short	
2008	The Black Balloon	Trevor – Social Worker		
2008	$9.99	Drazen / Radio Announcer / Bean Bag (voice)	Stop motion animated film	
2009	Triangle	Downey		
2009	Nightwalking	Dad	Short	
2010	Dying Ice	Cael	Short	
2010	Deliberation	Tim	Short	
2010	Cold Sore	Guy	Short	
2011	Venger	Agent Hollis	Short	
2011	Sleeping Beauty	Lucy's Ex-boyfriend		
2011	Shelling Peas	Policeman	Short	
2012	Skull Punch	Vincent	Short	
2012	Cryo	Harris	Short	
2012	Butterflies	Mean Boy (voice)	Animated short	
2012	Scumbus	David Rizeman		
2012	Being Venice	Marcus		
2012	The One Who Broke Your Heart	Preppie	Short	
2013	Amina	Roman Sokalov	Short	
2013	Compulsion	Max	Short	
2013	The Landing	Father		
2014	Notes	George	Short	
2015	Terminus	Agent Epstein		
2015	A Month of Sundays	Kyle Holland		
2016	Down Under	Police Officer		
2017	Face	Steve	Short	
2019	Little Monsters	Security Guard #1		
2019	Ride Like a Girl	Andrew Payne		
2020	Suspect	Andrew	Short	
2021	Blackout	Drew	Short	
2024	The Moogai	Brett		
2026	Alphabet Lane	Cory		
2026	Primitive War	Bishop		

=== Theatre ===
Year	Title	Role	Notes	Ref.
2001	A Poor Student		Marian St Theatre, Sydney	
2005	A Girl in a Car with a Man	Alex	Old Fitzroy Theatre, Sydney	
	Lord of the Flies	Roger	Stables Theatre, Sydney with Griffin Theatre Company	
2008	Frankenstein		Wharf Theatre, Sydney with STC	
	Knives in Hens		Belvoir B-Sharp	
	Loveplay		Belvoir B-Sharp	
2018	Degenerate Art	Adolf Hitler	Old Fitzroy Theatre, Sydney with Red Line Productions	
2022	The Caretaker	Mick	Ensemble Theatre, Sydney	
2025	So Young	Milo	Old Fitzroy Theatre, Sydney with Outhouse Theatre Co	

== Writing credits ==
Year	Title	Role	Notes	Ref.
2017	Face	Writer	Short	

== Awards and nominations ==
Year	Work	Award	Category	Result	Ref.
2017	The Kettering Incident	2017 Logie Awards	Silver Logie for Most Outstanding Actor	Won	
