= Josef Ber =

Australian actor, director and writer

- Born: Josef Ber; January 10; Australia
- Occupations: Actor; director; writer

Josef Ber is an Australian actor, director and writer, best known for his role as Sergeant Dominic Wales in the television series Rush.

== Early life ==
Ber grew up in Sydney Australia. He went to school at Marayong Heights Public School, Lorien Novalis and Baulkham Hills High School. He graduated from Australia's National Institute of Dramatic Art (NIDA) with a degree in Performing Arts (Acting) in 1997.

Ber started out as a singer in his teens, performing at Australia’s Wonderland.

== Career ==
In addition to his role as Sergeant Dominic Wales in Rush, Ber has had recurring roles in McLeod's Daughters (2004; 2007), East West 101 (2009), Janet King (2016) and Pieces of Her (2022). He appeared in Home and Away as several characters (spanning from 1990 to 2017).

Other television appearances include guest roles in Love My Way, The Surgeon, All Saints, Young Lions, Murder Call, Wildside and Water Rats.

Ber's first stage performance, was in the musical Grease, which toured Australia and New Zealand in the early 90's. Since then he has appeared on stage regularly. He most recently toured Australia as Bill Austin in Mamma Mia! (2017–2018), and appeared as Sir Joseph Porter in H.M.S. Pinafore for Sydney Festival (2021).

Ber has written, directed, produced and edited four short films, including Jack's Promise (2015) written exclusively for Cinema Australia.

In 2024, Ber appeared in the third season of award-winning political drama Total Control. and as Hugh Horvat in the miniseries Critical Incident.

== Personal life ==
Ber has two daughters together with his partner. He is both a rugby league and baseball fan, supporting Wests Tigers and LA Dodgers.

== Filmography ==
=== Television ===
Year	Title	Role	Notes
1993	E Street	Hank Williams	1 episode
1998	Water Rats	Owen	Episode: "Mocha Fudge"
1998	Wildside	Officer Colin Ryan	Episodes: #1.24 & #1.25
2000	Murder Call	Michael Frampton	Episode: "Paid in Full"
2002	Young Lions	Officer Craig Simons	Episode: "Drag Racing"
2004	All Saints	Dusty Crow	Episode: "Happy Families"
2005	Dramatically Black		Episode: "Plains Empty"
2005	The Surgeon	Obstetric Registrar	Episode: #1.3
2004–2007	McLeod's Daughters	Hugh Mcleod	2 episodes
2006	The Alice	Amon Fitzsimmons	Miniseries, 1 episode
2007	Love My Way	Bruce	Episode: "And in the End"
2008–2010	Rush	Sergeant Dominic 'Dom' Wales	41 episodes
2009	East West 101	Agent Doug Ford	6 episodes
2011	Rescue: Special Ops	Blake Owens	1 episode
2011	Wild Boys	Mr Prescott	1 episode
2012	Tricky Business	Adrian Penn	1 episode
2012	Devil's Dust	Ted Banton	Miniseries, 2 episodes
2013	Redfern Now	Luis	1 episode
2014	ANZAC Girls	Major Sherwin	2 episodes
2015	Australia:The Story of Us	Geoff Maiden	Miniseries, 1 episode
2016	Janet King	Robbie Carter	5 episodes
2016	Brock	James Macintosh	Miniseries, 1 episode
1990; 1999; 2005; 2006; 2012; 2017	Home and Away	Dr. Matthews / Student / Johnno / Will Shepard	14 episodes
2022	Pieces of Her	Detective Shooltz	Miniseries, 2 episodes
2023	Strife	Eddy (Auctioneer)	1 episode
2024	Total Control	Dominic	5 episodes
2024	Critical Incident	Hugh Horvat	6 episodes

=== Film ===
Year	Title	Role	Notes
1999	Powderburn	Clay	Feature film
2002	The Junction Boys	Pine	TV movie
2003	Ned	Joe Byrne / Orderly	Feature film
2005	The Umbrella	Smoker	Short film
2008	$9.99	Voice role	Animated stop-motion film
2011	Babies from the Future	Agent Johnstone	Short film
2011	Things to Do	Tim	Short film
2012	Treading Water	John	Short film
2014	Notes		Short film
2015	Jack's Promise	Allistair	Short film
2015	Talk to Someone	Joe	Short film
2015	Three Kings	Donnie / Rick / George	Short film
2016	Down Under	Police Officer	Feature film
2018	The Defector	Teddy Knox	Short film
2019	Break Street	Uncle Frank	Short film

==== As director, writer, producer & editor ====
Year	Title	Role	Notes
2005	The Umbrella	Short film	Also cinematographer & composer
2014	Notes	Short film	
2015	Jack's Promise	Short film	
2019	Break Street	Short film	

== Theatre ==
Year	Title	Role	Notes
1992–1993	Grease		Festival Theatre, Adelaide, Lyric Theatre, Brisbane, State Theatre, Melbourne with Gordon/Frost Organisation
1995	The Kid	Dean	NIDA
1996	Philistines	Teterev	NIDA
1996	The Wild Duck	Dinner Guest	NIDA
1996	Henry VI	Winchester / Richard Plantagenet	NIDA
1996	The Caucasian Chalk Circle		NIDA
1996	Baby Doll		NIDA
1997	The Hostage	Rio Rita	NIDA
1999	Polly Blue		Belvoir St Theatre, Sydney with Siren Theatre Co
2000	Wanna Go Home Baby?		Belvoir St Theatre, Sydney with Siren Theatre Co
2001	The Laramie Project	Moisés Kaufman / Rulon Stacey / Phil Laurie / Jon Peacock / Cal Rerucha / Aaron McKinney / John McAdams / Anonymous / Reverend Davis, Baptist Minister	Belvoir St Theatre, Sydney
2001	The Tempest		Glen St Theatre, Sydney with Bell Shakespeare
2002	Lobby Hero		Ensemble Theatre, Sydney
2003	Bash		Glen Street Theatre with Ulladulla Picture Co
2003	Frozen		Belvoir St Theatre, Sydney with Siren Theatre Co
2004	Run Rabbit Run!	Mark Courtney / Norman Nicholas / Peter Macourt	Belvoir St Theatre, Sydney
2005	Rice Pudding		Seymour Centre with Siren Theatre Co for Short + Sweet
2005	A Foetal Moment		Cat & Fiddle Hotel, Sydney with for Gestation Productions
2006	Human Resources		Darlinghurst Theatre, Sydney with Siren Theatre Co
2007	Floyd Collins		Sydney Theatre with Kookaburra Musical Theatre
2007	Tiger Country	Eddie	Stables Theatre, Sydney with Griffin Theatre Company
2008	Twelfth Night		Wharf Theatre, Sydney
2008	All the Blood and All the Water		Casula Powerhouse with Riverside Productions
2012	Porn.Cake	Bill	Stables Theatre, Sydney with Griffin Theatre Company
2012	My First Time		Sydney Opera House with Kay & McLean Productions
2015	Misterman	Voiceover artist	Old Fitzroy Theatre, Sydney, Theatre Royal, Backspace, Hobart with Siren Theatre Company
2016	Savages	Rabbit	Eternity Playhouse, Sydney with Darlinghurst Theatre Company
2017	The Ham Funeral		Stables Theatre, Sydney with Siren Theatre Company
2017–2018	Mamma Mia!	Bill Austin	Canberra Theatre, Lyric Theatre, Brisbane, Capitol Theatre, Sydney, Crown Perth, Princess Theatre, Melbourne, Festival Theatre, Adelaide
2019	Nothing	The Man	Salamanca Arts Centre, Hobart with Blue Cow Theatre Inc & Siren Theatre Company
2021	H.M.S. Pinafore	Sir Joseph Porter	Riverside Theatres Parramatta with Siren Theatre Company for Sydney Festival
	Pan		
	Responsive Project #2		STC
