= Marion Potts =

Australian theatre director

- Born: 1965 (age 60–61)
- Education: University of Sydney; National Institute of Dramatic Art
- Occupation: Theatre director
- Spouse: Ned Manning
- Children: 2

Marion Potts is an Australian theatre director.

== Early life and education ==
Potts developed an interest in the theatre when she went to see Shakespeare’s Twelfth Night on a school excursion.

While attending the University of Sydney, she joined the Sydney University Dramatic Society and contemplated a career in theatre after studying theatre symbiotics with an inspiring female academic. She obtained a Bachelor of Arts in French and a Master of Philosophy in Performance Studies. She also studied directing at the National Institute of Dramatic Art (NIDA).

== Career ==
Potts has directed productions for many of Australia's major theatre companies including Sydney Theatre Company, Melbourne Theatre Company, Queensland Theatre Company, Malthouse Theatre, State Theatre Company of South Australia, Griffin Theatre Company, Bell Shakespeare and Victorian Opera.

Potts was a Resident Director for the Sydney Theatre Company from 1995 to 1999. She was Bell Shakespeare’s Associate Artistic Director and Artistic Director of its development arm, Mind’s Eye, from 2005 to 2010. She was Artistic Director of the Malthouse Theatre in Melbourne from 2010 to 2015. She became Director of Theatre with the Australia Council in 2015. Marion was Executive Producer of Performing Lines from 2017 to 2024.

She was also a founding directorate member of HotHouse Theatre and has been Chair of World Interplay, Townsville, a board member of Griffin Theatre Company, Windmill Theatre and Playworks, and Curator of the National Playwrights Conference.

== Awards and nominations ==
Year	With	Award	Category	Result
2006	The Goat, or Who is Sylvia?	Helpmann Awards	Best Direction of a Play || style="background: #9EFF9E; color: #000; vertical-align: middle; text-align: center; " class="yes table-yes2 notheme"|Won	
2007	The Goat, or Who is Sylvia?	Sydney Theatre Awards	Best Direction of a Play || style="background: #FFE3E3; color: black; vertical-align: middle; text-align: center; " class="no table-no2 notheme"|Nominated	
2008	Venus and Adonis	Green Room Awards	Best Direction	Nominated
2011	Meow Meow's Little Match Girl	Green Room Awards	Best Cabaret Director	Won

== Personal life ==
Potts is married to actor Ned Manning, with whom she had two children. In 2010, they relocated from Sydney to Melbourne when she was appointed director of the Malthouse Theatre.

== Credits ==
=== As director / creator ===
Year	Title	Role	Venue / Co.
1988	Sylvia Plath: a dramatic portrait	Director	University of Sydney
1990	Struth	Director	Stables Theatre, Sydney
1992	The Will	Director	Harold Park Hotel, Sydney with Lounge Acts
1993, 1994	The Gap	Director	Belvoir Street Theatre, Sydney, Civic Square, Canberra with Asia Arts Management
1993	The Gentleman's New Clothes (aka Le Bourgeois Gentilhomme)	Director	Belvoir Street Theatre, Sydney
1994	Falsettos	Assistant Director	Monash University, Melbourne with STC
1994	The Cafe Latte Kid / Darling Oscar	Director	Wharf Studio Theatre, Sydney with STC
1995	Sydney Stories 2: The Blessing / Two Wongs / In the Club / The Way I Was		Wharf Theatre, Sydney with STC for Sydney Festival
1995	Dead White Males	Assistant Director	Regional Australian tour, Sydney Opera House with STC
1995	Two Weeks with the Queen	Director	Alexander Theatre, Johannesburg, South African State Theatre, Wharf Theatre, Sydney with STC
1995	Tales from the Vienna Woods	Director	NIDA Parade Theatre, Sydney
1995	Three Tall Women	Assistant Director	Wharf Theatre, Sydney with STC, Fairfax Studio, Melbourne with MTC, Gold Coast Arts Centre
1995, 1996	Beecham	Director	Marian Street Theatre, Sydney for Sydney Festival
1996	Playgrounds	Director	Wharf Theatre, Sydney with STC
1996	The Torrents	Director	Playhouse, Adelaide with STCSA
1996, 1997	Who's Afraid of Virginia Woolf?	Assistant Director	Queens Park Theatre, Perth, Bunbury Regional Entertainment Centre, Esperance Civic Centre, His Majesty's Theatre, Perth, Theatre Royal, Hobart, Burnie Arts and Function Centre, Princess Theatre, Launceston, Canberra Theatre, Sydney Opera House with Glen Street Theatre & STC
1997, 1998	The Herbal Bed	Director	Wharf Theatre, Sydney, Playhouse, Adelaide, Canberra Theatre with Royal Shakespeare Company, with STCSA & STC
1997	Pygmalion	Director	Glen Street Theatre, Sydney, Canberra Theatre with STC
1997	Gary's House	Director	Adelaide Festival Centre with STCSA
1997	Closer	Director	Wharf Theatre, Sydney with STC
1998	Navigating	Director	Sydney Opera House with STC
1999	Cyrano de Bergerac	Director	Wharf Theatre, Sydney with STC
1999	Big Hair in America	Director	The Butter Factory Theatre, Wodonga with HotHouse Theatre
2000	Equus	Director	Playhouse, Adelaide with STCSA
2000	The Beauty Queen of Leenane	Associate Director	Playhouse, Adelaide, Fairfax Studio, Melbourne with STC & with MTC
2000	Life After George	Director	Wharf Theatre, Sydney with STC
2001	Don Juan	Director	Sydney Opera House with STC
2002	Volpone	Director	Sydney Opera House
2002	Fear and Misery of the Third Reich	Director	Western Sydney University
2003	Wonderlands	Director	The Butter Factory Theatre, Wodonga, Riverina Playhouse, Wagga Wagga, Stables Theatre, Sydney with HotHouse Theatre, Griffin Theatre Company & Riverina Theatre Company
2003	A Midsummer Night’s Dream	Artistic Director	Amphitheatre, Gateway Island, Wodonga with HotHouse Theatre
2004	Dreaming Transportation	Director	Sydney Opera House with Performing Lines
2004	A Number	Director	Brisbane Powerhouse with STCSA
2004	Newton's Cradle	Director	Wharf Theatre, Sydney with Blueprints
2005	Cyrano de Bergerac	Translator	Playhouse, Melbourne with MTC
2005, 2006	The Goat, or Who Is Sylvia?	Director	Dunstan Playhouse, Adelaide, Seymour Centre, Sydney with STCSA
2006	Constance Drinkwater and the final days of Somerset	Director	Bille Brown Studio, Brisbane with Queensland Theatre
2007	Othello	Director	Playhouse, Canberra, Playhouse, Melbourne, Sydney Opera House, Orange Civic Theatre with Bell Shakespeare
2007	The Story of the Miracles at Cookie's Table	Director	Stables Theatre, Sydney, Butter Factory Theatre, Wodonga with HotHouse Theatre & Griffin Theatre Company
2008, 2009	Venus and Adonis	Director	Malthouse Theatre, Melbourne, Wharf Theatre, Sydney, Bruce Mason Centre, Auckland with Bell Shakespeare
2008	Hamlet	Director	Sydney Opera House, Playhouse, Melbourne with Bell Shakespeare
2009	Grace	Director	Fairfax Studio, Melbourne with MTC
2009	The Wonderful World of Dissocia	Director	Wharf Theatre, Sydney with STC & MTC
2009	The Taming of the Shrew	Director	Theatre Royal, Hobart, Sir Robert Helpmann Theatre, Mt Gambier, Chaffey Theatre, Renmark, Barossa Arts and Convention Centre, Northern Festival Centre, Port Pirie, Middleback Theatre, Whyalla, Nautilus Theatre, Port Lincoln, Canberra Theatre, Sydney Opera House with Bell Shakespeare
2010	King Lear	Director	Sydney Opera House, Playhouse, Canberra, Playhouse, Brisbane, Playhouse, Melbourne, His Majesty's Theatre, Perth with Bell Shakespeare
2010	Sappho...In Nine Fragments	Director	Malthouse Theatre, Melbourne
2010	Uncle Vanya	Associate Director	Sydney Theatre with STC
2011	‘Tis Pity She’s a Whore	Director	Malthouse Theatre, Melbourne
2011, 2012	Little Match Girl	Director	Malthouse Theatre, Melbourne, The Famous Spiegeltent, Sydney, Queen Elizabeth Hall, London
2012	Blood Wedding	Director	Malthouse Theatre, Melbourne
2012	Wild Surmise	Director	Malthouse Theatre, Melbourne
2013	Hate	Director	Malthouse Theatre, Melbourne
2013	The Dragon	Director	Malthouse Theatre, Melbourne
2013–2014, 2016	The Shadow King	Dramaturge	Malthouse Theatre, Melbourne, Carriageworks, Sydney, Heath Ledger Theatre, Perth, Her Majesty's Theatre, Adelaide, Darwin Amphitheatre, Godinymayin Yijard Rivers Arts and Culture, Katherine, Brisbane Powerhouse, Barbican Theatre, London
2014	Ugly Mugs	Director	Malthouse Theatre, Melbourne, Stables Theatre, Sydney with Griffin Theatre Company
2014	Cyrano de Bergerac	Translator	Sydney Theatre with STC
2014, 2016	The Riders	Director	Malthouse Theatre, Melbourne with Victorian Opera, His Majesty's Theatre, Perth with West Australian Opera
2015	Meme Girls	Creator	Malthouse Theatre, Melbourne
2017	Di and Viv and Rose	Director	Southbank Theatre, Melbourne with MTC
2018	Good Cook. Friendly. Clean.	Director	Stables Theatre, Sydney with Griffin Theatre Company

=== As actor ===
Year	Title	Role	Venue / Co.
1989	Artaud at Rodez		University of Sydney
