= Noise (2007 Australian film) =

- theatrical poster
- Directed by: Matthew Saville
- Written by: Matthew Saville
- Produced by: Trevor Blainey
- Starring: Brendan Cowell; Henry Nixon; Luke Elliot; Katie Wall; Maia Thomas; Nicholas Bell
- Cinematography: Laszlo Baranyai
- Edited by: Geoff Hitchins
- Music by: Bryony Marks
- Distributed by: Madman Entertainment (Australia); Film Movement (US)
- Release date: 18 January 2007 (Sundance Film Festival)
- Running time: 108 minutes
- Country: Australia
- Language: English
- Box office: $869,107

Noise is a 2007 Australian drama-thriller film written and directed by Matthew Saville. The film stars Brendan Cowell, Henry Nixon, Luke Elliot, Katie Wall, Maia Thomas and Nicholas Bell.

== Plot ==
The film is set against the landscape of two potentially related murders: that of an engaged woman in the inner-western Melbourne suburb of Sunshine, and that of seven passengers on a Melbourne train. From there, the film deals primarily with the experiences of Lavinia Smart, a young woman who boarded the train shortly after the murders, and police Constable Graham McGahan, who is afflicted with increasingly severe tinnitus. When he requests light duty on account of his tinnitus, Constable McGahan is assigned the night shift of a police information van in Sunshine, where he encounters the traumatized members of the local community, including Lucky Phil, a mentally handicapped man, and Dean Stouritis, the dead woman's fiancé.

At the same time, the film explores the fear Lavinia experiences after the horrific events she witnessed. Although she escapes with her life, the police are dissatisfied with her statements and accuse her of holding back information. Lavinia is further traumatized when she realizes that the killer has stolen a portrait that can be used to identify her. The police try to reassure her of her safety, but a man she identified in a police lineup easily tracks her down and tries to intimidate her. After Lavinia angrily confronts him and explains her situation, he apologizes and gives her a ride back to her house.

After McGahan dismisses the concerns of Craig Finlay, a profane racist, Finlay ambushes McGahan and opens fire on the van with a shotgun. Finlay also kills a passing motorist while hunting McGahan, who escapes through a window. The crashed car's horn cancels out McGahan's tinnitus, and he hears Finlay approaching him. McGahan kills Finlay, though he is shot and wounded. After he rescues a baby from the car, McGahan collapses, and the film leaves his ultimate fate unresolved.

== Cast ==
- Brendan Cowell as Graham McGahan
- Maia Thomas as Lavinia Smart
- Fiona Macleod as Melanie Ryan
- Nicholas Bell as Noel Birchall
- Katie Wall as Caitlin Robinson, Graham's girlfriend
- Henry Nixon as Craig Finlay
- Simon Laherty as Lucky Phil
- Luke Elliot as Dean Stouritis
- Nathan Page as Nigel Gower
- Monica Maughan as Elderly woman
- Maude Davey as Constable Rhonda Harris

== Production ==
Tinnitus was chosen for its inescapability and to emphasise themes of isolation. Matthew Saville begun writing the script after the Port Arthur Massacre in August 1997. He states that he was fascinated by the country's resilience following their grief. The film faced commercial issues: it was designed to be difficult to categorize, unknown actors were chosen for casting, and a distinctly Australian voice made foreign distribution difficult. Saville, however, wanted to remain honest and uncompromising in his script.

== Release ==
Noise premiered at the 2007 Sundance Film Festival. It received a limited release in Australia on 3 May 2007 and grossed $869,107 at the box office. It was released on DVD on 10 October 2007.

== Reception ==
Margaret Pomeranz gave the film four and a half stars out of five and David Stratton four out of five on At the Movies. Paul Brynes of The Sydney Morning Herald rated it 3.5/4 stars and called it "an impressive debut, a serious, fresh, surprising film by a writer-director with plenty on his mind." Jake Wilson of The Age rated it 3.5/5 stars and wrote that Saville "demonstrates considerable reserves of dry wit." Russell Edwards of Variety called the film "a slickly executed experiment full of sound and fury, signifying nothing more than technical prowess."

=== Awards ===
Award	Category	Subject	Result
AACTA Awards (2007 AFI Awards)	Best Film	Trevor Blainey	Nominated
AACTA Awards (2007 AFI Awards)	Best Direction	Matthew Saville	Nominated
AACTA Awards (2007 AFI Awards)	Best Screenplay, Original or Adapted	Matthew Saville	Nominated
AACTA Awards (2007 AFI Awards)	Best Actor	Brendan Cowell	Nominated
AACTA Awards (2007 AFI Awards)	Best Cinematography	Laszlo Baranyai	Nominated
AACTA Awards (2007 AFI Awards)	Best Editing	Geoff Hitchins	Nominated
AACTA Awards (2007 AFI Awards)	Best Original Music Score	Bryony Marks	Nominated
AACTA Awards (2007 AFI Awards)	Best Sound	Emma Bortignon	Won
AACTA Awards (2007 AFI Awards)	Best Sound	Philippe Decrausaz	Won
AACTA Awards (2007 AFI Awards)	Best Sound	Doron Kipen	Won
AACTA Awards (2007 AFI Awards)	Best Production Design	Paddy Reardon	Nominated
Australian Directors Guild	Best Direction in a Feature Film	Matthew Saville	Won
ASSG Award	Feature Film Soundtrack of the Year		Nominated
ASSG Award	Best Achievement in Sound for Film Sound Recording	Philippe Decrausaz	Nominated
ASSG Award	Best Achievement in Sound for Film Sound Recording	Georgina Hanley	Nominated
ASSG Award	Best Achievement in Sound for Film Sound Design	Scott Findlay	Won
ASSG Award	Best Achievement in Sound for Film Sound Design	Gerard Long	Won
ASSG Award	Best Achievement in Sound for Film Sound Design	Jed Palmer	Won
ASSG Award	Best Achievement in Sound for Film Sound Design	Emma Bortignon	Won
ASSG Award	Best Achievement in Sound for Film Sound Mixing	Emma Bortignon	Won
ASSG Award	Best Achievement in Sound for Film Sound Mixing	Doron Kipen	Won
ASSG Award	Best Achievement in Sound for Film Sound Mixing	Keith Thomas	Won
AWGIE Award	Best Writing in a Feature Film - Original	Matthew Saville	Nominated
Chicago International Film Festival	Gold Hugo - New Directors Competition	Matthew Saville	Nominated
FCCA Awards	Best Film	Trevor Blainey	Won
FCCA Awards	Best Director	Matthew Saville	Won
FCCA Awards	Best Screenplay	Matthew Saville	Nominated
FCCA Awards	Best Actor	Brendan Cowell	Won
FCCA Awards	Best Cinematography	László Baranyai	Won
FCCA Awards	Best Editing	Geoff Hitchins	Won
FCCA Awards	Best Music Score	Bryony Marks	Won
Golden Trailer Award	Best Sound Editing		Nominated
Inside Film Award	Best Director	Matthew Saville	Nominated
Inside Film Award	Best Actor	Brendan Cowell	Nominated
Inside Film Award	Best Editing	Geoff Hitchins	Won
Inside Film Award	Best Music	Bryony Marks	Nominated
Inside Film Award	Best Sound	Emma Bortignon	Won
Inside Film Award	Best Sound	Philippe Decrausaz	Won
Inside Film Award	Best Sound	Doron Kipen	Won
Leeds International Film Festival	Special Mention	Matthew Saville	Won
Sundance Film Festival	Grand Jury Prize	Matthew Saville	Nominated
