= Newton's Law (TV series) =

Australian television series

- Genre: Drama
- Created by: Deb Cox; Fiona Eagger
- Starring: Claudia Karvan; Toby Schmitz; Brett Tucker; Georgina Naidu; Sean Keenan; Miranda Tapsell; Andrew McFarlane; Jane Hall; Ming-Zhu Hii; Will Ewing; Ella Newton; Makwaya Masudi
- Country of origin: Australia
- No. of episodes: 8

Production
- Production locations: Melbourne, Victoria
- Production company: Every Cloud Productions

Original release
- Network: ABC Television
- Release: 9 February – 30 March 2017

Newton's Law is an Australian television drama series that began airing on ABC TV on 9 February 2017. The eight-part series was developed from an original concept by Deb Cox and Fiona Eagger.

== Premise ==
The series follows Josephine Newton (Claudia Karvan), a suburban solicitor with an overdeveloped sense of responsibility who attempts to return to her briefly glorious stint at the Bar. After Josephine's modest neighborhood solicitor's practice is incinerated by arson, she is persuaded by an old university friend and not-so-secret admirer, Lewis Hughes QC (Toby Schmitz), to join the high-flying Knox Chambers. With her marriage collapsing and motherhood fast losing its charm, Josephine decides it's time to again put on her wig and barrister's robe.

== Cast ==
- Claudia Karvan as Josephine Newton
- Toby Schmitz as Lewis Hughes QC
- Brett Tucker as Callum Docker
- Georgina Naidu as Helena Chatterjee
- Sean Keenan as Johnny Allbright
- Miranda Tapsell as Skye Stewart
- Andrew McFarlane as Eric Whitley QC
- Jane Hall as Jackie Russo
- Ming-Zhu Hii as Claire Zhang
- Makwaya Masudi as Zareb Mulumba
- Ella Newton as Lydia Newton-Docker
- Freya Stafford as Rose Newton
- Jason Agius as Nikos Aristides
- Simon Maiden as Alan Edgeworth
- Lester Ellis Jr. as Gregor 'Spike' Zdunowski
- Matt Boesenberg as Ryan Wexler
- Ernie Dingo as Frank Stewart
- Alice Ansara as Carla
- Greg Stone as Judge Gregg Halliday
- Marta Kaczmarek as Zora
- Katherine Hicks as Tracey Dingwell
- Heather Mitchell as Caroline Gale
- Andrew Blackman as Lars Svensson
- Eddie Baroo as Shane
- Anthony Brandon Wong as Gang Chen
- Ella Scott Lynch as Lana Devries

== Episodes ==
No.	Title	Directed by	Written by	Original release date	AUS viewers (millions)
1	"External Forces"	Jennifer Leacey	Belinda Chayko	9 February 2017	0. 695
When her suburban solicitor's office is incinerated by a disgruntled client, Josephine Newton resumes her briefly glorious career at the Bar.
2	"The Butterfly Effect"	Jennifer Leacey	Chris Corbett	16 February 2017	0.546
Josephine takes the lead in a gender dysphoria case while, downstairs, Helena defends Lydia against a criminal damage charge.
3	"Control Therapy"	Jennifer Perrott	Elizabeth Packett	23 February 2017	0.509
Josephine & Lewis inherit a murder trial where all the evidence points to the client being guilty, while Johnny & Skye are reluctantly thrown together to help defend Skye's father from an assault charge.
4	"Uniform Motion"	Jennifer Perrott	Elizabeth Coleman	2 March 2017	0.455
Josephine worries she's crossed over to the dark side when representing a furniture conglomerate, but manages to assist the underdog in a downstairs case.
5	"Newton's Law of Cooling"	Jonathan Brough	Belinda Chayko	9 March 2017	0.480
Josephine is surprised that Whitley wants her to represent him in a property dispute, and the downstairs team make their own discoveries in what is ostensibly a simple assault case.
6	"The Uncertainty Principle"	Jonathan Brough	Chris Corbett	16 March 2017	0.484
Josephine's high profile asylum seeker kidnapping case is further complicated when Callum intervenes, landing Josephine's witness, and himself, in hot water.
7	"Terminal Velocity"	Jennifer Leacey	Ellie Beaumont	23 March 2017	0.412
As Josephine unexpectedly re-unites with a former client, Lewis' defence of a privileged thief unearths a troubling link between the boy and her sister, Rose.
8	"Equal & Opposite Forces"	Jennifer Leacey	Elizabeth Coleman	30 March 2017	0.460
The upstairs and downstairs teams join forces in a class action, taking on a pharmaceutical company that tried to cover up the side effects resulting from their drug trials.

== Ratings ==
No.	Title	Air date	Overnight ratings		Consolidated ratings		Total viewers	Ref(s)
No.	Title	Air date	Viewers	Rank	Viewers	Rank	Total viewers	Ref(s)
1	External Forces	9 February 2017	695,000	7	137,000	6	832,000	
2	The Butterfly Effect	16 February 2017	546,000	15	120,000	11	666,000	
3	Control Therapy	23 February 2017	509,000	16	92,000	12	602,000	
4	Uniform Motion	2 March 2017	455,000	17	94,000	11	549,000	
5	Newton's Law of Cooling	9 March 2017	480,000	15	108,000	12	588,000	
6	The Uncertainty Principle	16 March 2017	484,000	14	92,000	8	576,000	
7	Terminal Velocity	23 March 2017	412,000	18	96,000	13	508,000	
8	Equal & Opposites Forces	30 March 2017	460,000	16	88,000	9	548,000	
