= Pals (TV series) =

1987 Australian television series

- Created by: Rob George; Ron Saunders
- Written by: Rob George; John Patterson
- Directed by: Mario Andreacchio
- Starring: Lachlan Haig; Ned Manning
- Composer: Stephen Matters
- Country of origin: Australia
- Original language: English
- No. of seasons: 1
- No. of episodes: 10

Production
- Producers: Jim George; Wayne Groom
- Cinematography: Roger Dowling
- Editor: Andrew Ellis
- Running time: 25 minutes
- Budget: $1.2 million

Original release
- Network: ABC
- Release: July 13 – July 28, 1987

Pals is an Australian television series that aired on ABC in 1987 during The Afternoon Show. It followed Sammy who ran off from his grandparents, Zeno and Anna, to join his father Oscar, a carnival stuntman, on the road. The pair are pursued by a private investigator, Jacko.

== Cast ==
- Lachlan Haig as Sammy
- Ned Manning as Oscar
- Moshe Kedem as Zeno
- Daphne Grey as Anna
- Dave Flannagan as Jacko
