= Brock (miniseries) =

2016 two-part Australian miniseries

- Genre: Drama
- Written by: Justin Monjo; Adam Todd
- Directed by: Geoff Bennett
- Starring: Matthew Le Nevez; Ella Scott Lynch; Brendan Cowell; Natalie Bassingthwaighte; Steve Bisley
- Country of origin: Australia
- Original language: English
- No. of episodes: 2

Production
- Executive producer: Rory Callaghan
- Producer: Kerrie Mainwaring
- Running time: 88 mins
- Production company: Endemol Shine Australia

Original release
- Network: Network Ten
- Release: 9 October – 10 October 2016

Brock is a two-part Australian miniseries based on the life of motor racing driver Peter Brock which premiered on Network Ten on 9 October 2016 & concluding on 10 October 2016.

== Synopsis ==
The series charts the highs of Peter Brock's motor racing career and the lows of his personal life. It covers his action packed career and his association with Holden for almost 40 years including a public split involving the controversial device the Energy Polariser. The controversy followed in his personal life with three marriages, many affairs and accusations of domestic violence.

== Cast ==
- Matthew Le Nevez as Peter Brock
- Ella Scott Lynch as Beverly Brock
- Brendan Cowell as Allan Moffat
- Natalie Bassingthwaighte as Julie Bamford
- Steve Bisley as Harry Firth
- Ryan Johnson as Tim 'Plastic' Pemberton
- Ben Hall as Phil Brock
- Nadia Townsend as Pauline Moffat/Sue McCure
- Henry Nixon as Shane Barry
- Kirsty Lee Allan as Michelle Downes
- Martin Sacks as Geoff Brock
- Axle Whitehead as Colin Bond
- Alex Williams as John 'Slug' Harvey
- Salvatore Coco as Jack 'Peanut' Freebody
- Ryan O'Kane as Dennis Sutcliff
- Brad McMurray as Al Turner
- Robert Mammone as Dr. Eric 'Rick' Dowker
- Rupert Reid as Norman Gown
- Joanne Samuel as Louise Kraft
- John Batchelor as Larry Perkins
- Josef Ber as James Macintosh
- Kristian Schmid as Evan Green
- Jon Sivewright as Mick Hone

== Episodes ==
No.	Title	Original release date	Australian viewers (thousands) (Note: Ratings for live, same day and timeshifted viewing within 7 days of the original airdate in 5-city metro areas)
1	"Part 1"	9 October 2016	964,000
2	"Part 2"	10 October 2016	694,000
