= Fátima Molina =

Mexican actress (born 1986)

- Born: Fátima Ileana Molina Vargas; 9 March 1986 (age 40); Ensenada, Baja California, Mexico
- Years active: 2008, 2015–present

Fátima Ileana Molina Vargas (born 9 March 1986) artistically known as Fátima Molina is a Mexican actress and singer, best known for her role as Lidya Corona in the Telemundo series La Doña (2016–2017), followed by her debut as the protagonist in the Sony Pictures Television series Tres Milagros (2018). In films, she has stood out for I Dream in Another Language, for which she was nominated at the Ariel Award for Best Supporting Actress.

== Biography ==
Molina born in Ensenada, Baja California, Mexico, but then she moved to Guadalajara, Jalisco. She began her career doing school theater. She studied Performing Arts at the Instituto Escena 3 and began to have roles in theater in plays such as Rent and Chicago, but it was not until 2008, when she participated in the reality show La Academia 6: Última generación of Televisión Azteca when her career began to take off.

== Filmography ==
=== Film roles ===
Year	Title	Roles	Notes
2016	El Hotel	Citlalli	
2017	I Dream in Another Language	Lluvia	Nominated – Ariel Award for Best Supporting Actress
2019	Marioneta	Belén	
2023	Where the Tracks End	Adult Valeria	

=== Television roles ===
Year	Title	Roles	Notes
2015	Señorita Pólvora	Juanita	Recurring role; 11 episodes
2015	El Dandy	Deyanira	Recurring role
2016	El Vato	Estela Núñez	Recurring role (season 1); 9 episodes
2016–2017	La Doña	Lidya Corona	Series regular (season 1); 102 episodes
2017	Las Malcriadas	Yuridia Cavarca	Recurring role; 11 episodes
2018	Tres Milagros	Milagros Cruz "Nikita"	Main role; 55 episodes
2018	Falco	Sonia García	Recurring role; 7 episodes
2018–2020	Diablero	Enriqueta Infante "Keta"	Main role (seasons 1–2); 14 episodes
2021	Luis Miguel: The Series	Paola Moreno	Episode 3, "Suave"
2021	Who Killed Sara?	Clara	Recurring role
2021	¿Te acuerdas de mí?	Vera Solís	Main Role
2022	Daddies on Request	Itzel	Main role (season 1); 10 episodes
TBA	S.O.Z. Soldados o Zombies	Lilia	Post-production
2026	Lobo, morir matando	Antonia Lazo	Main role
