= Katie Wall =

Australian actress

Katie Wall is an Australian actress who has appeared in various television and film roles.

== Filmography ==
=== Film ===
Year	Title	Role	Notes
2007	Clubland	Kelly	
2007	Noise	Const. Caitlin Robinson	
2009	My Year Without Sex	Winona	
2012	Not Suitable for Children	Ex-girlfriend in park	
2012	Being Venice	Irene	

=== Television ===
Year	Title	Role	Notes
1998	Water Rats	Donna King	"Die for Me"
2002	All Saints	Diana Short	"No Expectations", "Secrets"
2003	Marking Time	Belinda	TV film
2004–05	The Secret Life of Us	Karen	Guest role (series 4)
2004–2006	Love My Way	Sonia McClusky	Recurring role (series 1–2)
2005	The Surgeon	Siobhan Kerry	Main role
2006	All Saints	Rhiannon Andrews	"Love and Hate"
2007	Dangerous	Esther	Main role
2009	The Cut	Kelly Ann Reed	"The Best Sex I Ever Had"
2009	Underbelly: A Tale of Two Cities	Karen Soich	Recurring role
2009	Dirt Game	Caz Cohen	Main role
2011	Crownies	Hannah Dean	"1.17"
2012–2014	Puberty Blues	Lynette Hayes	Main role (series 1), recurring (series 2)
2015	Winter	Tammy Davis	TV miniseries
2016	Cleverman	Rowena	"A Free Ranger", "A Man of Vision", "Terra Nullius"
2023	The Appleton Ladies' Potato Race	Nikki Bunyan	TV film
