= Lobo, morir matando =

- Genre: Drama
- Based on: Morir matando by F.G. Haghenbeck
- Developed by: Indira Páez
- Written by: Amaris Páez; Jośe Vicente Spataro; Laura Sosa; Felipe Silva; Christian Jimenez
- Directed by: Enrique Begné; Carlos Carrera; Rolando Ocampo; Julia Rivero
- Starring: Arap Bethke; Fátima Molina; Angélica Celaya; Marjorie de Sousa; Alejandro de la Madrid; Camille Mina
- Composer: Enrique Díaz
- Country of origin: United States
- Original language: Spanish
- No. of seasons: 1
- No. of episodes: 70

Production
- Executive producer: Gabriela Valentán
- Producers: Cynthia Martínez; Arcelia Tapia
- Cinematography: Rocco Rodríguez; Luis Montalvo
- Editor: Hader Antivar
- Production company: Telemundo Studios

Original release
- Network: Telemundo
- Release: 17 February – 9 June 2026

Lobo, morir matando is an American television series developed by Indira Páez for Telemundo. It is an adaptation of the 2022 novel Morir matando by F.G. Haghenbeck. The series stars Arap Bethke and Fátima Molina. It aired from 17 February 2026 from 9 June 2026.

== Cast ==
=== Main ===
- Arap Bethke as Damián Rosales "Lobo"
- Fátima Molina as Antonia Lazo
- Angélica Celaya as Miranda Villanueva
- Marjorie de Sousa as Graciela Villanueva
- Alejandro de la Madrid as Hernando Cruz
- Camille Mina as Renata de la Colina
- Ofelia Medina as Guillermina Ortiz
- Gina Moret as Remedios
- Dominika Paleta as Leonor Castañeda
- Eduardo Yáñez as Plácido García "El Azufrero"
- Gabriel Porras as Eugenio Lazo
- Roberto Romano as Dante Melquiades
- Christian Ramos as Fernando Cuevas
- Mariano Palacios as Santiago Vega
- Jorge A. Jimenez as Nemesio Carrillo "El Cocula"
- Roberto Quijano as Hugo Rivas
- Majo Perez as Adela Montes
- Tizoc Arroyo as Rodolfo Paz "El Cripta"
- Héctor Marino Testarrosa as Misael García
- Eduardo Zucchi as Óscar García
- Daniel Lozano as Ignacio Cruz
- César Díaz as César Cruz
- Mara Cuevas as Zahie
- Jennifer Gabrielle as Sue Carrillo
- Lucero Cardoza as Magola
- Gerardo Oñate as Carlo Musazzi

=== Recurring and guest stars ===
- Rafael Novoa as Gustavo de la Colina
- Gabriela Roel as Berta Castaño
- David Aguiar as Javi
- Svetko Vladich as Alexey
- Gonzalo de Esesarte as Agustín Castillo
- Rodolfo Zarco as El Martillo
- Álvaro Sagone as Licenciado Martínez
- Rafa Blásquez as Ramos
- Bárbara Falconi as Esperanza
- Lucas Mollar as Lucas
- Evan Regueira as Fabio
- Rebeca Manríquez as Teresa
- Homero Ali as Raúl Briseño "El Alicate"
- Enrique Trejo as Rodo
- Tito Guillén as Judge Hermenegildo del Valle
- Manu Nna as himself
- Darío Cisneros as Pablo
- Eduardo Reza as Rúben
- Luis Enrique Álvarez
- Arly Velázquez as Adrián Rivas
- Kandy Ramírez as Aida
- Norma Reyna as Lola
- David Villalpando as Arsenio Cuevas
- Carlos Ceja as El Tuerto

== Production ==
On 8 May 2025, Lobo was announced by Telemundo at their upfront for the 2025–2026 television season. Filming of the series began on 27 October 2025. A few days later, Lobo, morir matando was confirmed as the official title of the series and the complete cast was announced.

== Episodes ==
No.	Title	Original air date
1	"La niña y el Lobo"	17 February 2026
2	"Visitante inesperado"	18 February 2026
3	"Animales"	19 February 2026
4	"Adiós Berta"	20 February 2026
5	"Cruzando el umbral"	23 February 2026
6	"Máscara contra máscara"	25 February 2026
7	"Dilema moral"	26 February 2026
8	"Apuntando"	27 February 2026
9	"Sin pruebas no hay fe"	2 March 2026
10	"Ruta de escape"	3 March 2026
11	"Esto no es un juego"	4 March 2026
12	"Casi grande"	5 March 2026
13	"Trágica revelación"	6 March 2026
14	"Encrucijada"	9 March 2026
15	"#nonospersigan"	10 March 2026
16	"Las fauces del Lobo"	11 March 2026
17	"Reencuentros inevitables"	12 March 2026
18	"La tregua"	13 March 2026
19	"La propuesta"	16 March 2026
20	"Confío en ti"	17 March 2026
21	"Amor de padres"	18 March 2026
22	"Los caminos se cruzan"	19 March 2026
23	"La huella de Miranda"	20 March 2026
24	"El eslabón débil"	23 March 2026
25	"El regreso de Antonia"	24 March 2026
26	"Auge y caída de Dante"	25 March 2026
27	"Dante al descubierto"	26 March 2026
28	"La captura de Lobo"	27 March 2026
29	"El descubrimiento de Eugenio"	30 March 2026
30	"El reclamo de Miranda"	1 April 2026
31	"Traición al descubierto"	2 April 2026
32	"La libertad de Eugenio"	3 April 2026
33	"Una muerte inesperada"	6 April 2026
34	"El desquite de Cruz"	7 April 2026
35	"Juntos de nuevo"	8 April 2026
36	"Cara a cara con Miranda"	9 April 2026
37	"El regreso de Miranda"	10 April 2026
38	"Los celos de Miranda"	13 April 2026
39	"Rivales enfrentadas"	14 April 2026
40	"El secuestro de Antonia"	15 April 2026
41	"Miranda da la cara al mundo"	16 April 2026
42	"El rescate de Antonia"	20 April 2026
43	"La decisión de Antonia"	21 April 2026
44	"La amenaza sobre Antonia"	22 April 2026
45	"La caída de Antonia"	27 April 2026
46	"El azufrero hunde a Antonia"	28 April 2026
47	"El encuentro de las hermanas"	29 April 2026
48	"Una prueba contra el fiscal"	30 April 2026
49	"Antonia debe morir"	4 May 2026
50	"Golpes para los malvados"	5 May 2026
51	"La hija del Lobo"	6 May 2026
52	"Jaque al fiscal"	7 May 2026
53	"La paternidad confirmada"	11 May 2026
54	"Antonia vuelve al juego"	12 May 2026
55	"El asesino de Gustavo"	13 May 2026
56	"La advertencia del fiscal"	14 May 2026
57	"La furia del Azufrero"	18 May 2026
58	"Una tregua con mentiras"	19 May 2026
59	"Expedientes cerrados"	20 May 2026
60	"En la mira del enemigo"	21 May 2026
61	"La caída de un ídolo"	25 May 2026
62	"El precio del silencio"	26 May 2026
63	"La fuga del Fiscal"	27 May 2026
64	"Tregua mortal"	28 May 2026
65	"Traición de sangre"	1 June 2026
66	"Verdades que destruyen"	2 June 2026
67	"El cerco se cierra"	3 June 2026
68	"Sangre de mi sangre"	4 June 2026
69	"El tesoro del jerarca"	8 June 2026
70	"Un nuevo comienzo"	9 June 2026
