= Triangle (2009 British film) =

2009 film by Christopher Smith

- Theatrical release poster
- Directed by: Christopher Smith
- Written by: Christopher Smith
- Produced by: Jason Newmark; Julie Baines; Chris Brown
- Starring: Melissa George; Michael Dorman; Rachael Carpani; Henry Nixon; Emma Lung; Liam Hemsworth
- Cinematography: Robert Humphreys
- Edited by: Stuart Gazzard
- Music by: Christian Henson
- Production companies: UK Film Council; Dan Films (UK)
- Distributed by: Icon Film Distribution
- Release dates: 27 August 2009 (FrightFest); 16 October 2009 (United Kingdom); 29 April 2010 (Australia)
- Running time: 99 minutes
- Countries: United Kingdom; Australia
- Language: English
- Budget: $12 million
- Box office: $1.3–1.6 million

Triangle is a 2009 British-Australian psychological horror film written and directed by Christopher Smith and starring Melissa George, Michael Dorman, Rachael Carpani, Henry Nixon, Emma Lung, and Liam Hemsworth. George portrays a single mother who goes on a boating trip with several friends. When they are forced to abandon their ship, they board a derelict ocean liner, where they become convinced that someone is stalking them. The screenplay is partly based on the story of Sisyphus, the Greek mythological figure cursed to repeatedly push a boulder up a hill without ever successfully reaching the top.

A British-Australian co-production, Triangle was financed by UK Film Council, which awarded £1.6 million ($2.8 million) of public money from the National Lottery fund towards the development, production, and distribution of the film. Smith cited a number of influences on the screenplay, ranging from The Twilight Zone to the films Dead of Night (1945), Back to the Future (1985), and Memento (2000). The film was shot on sets and on location in Queensland, Australia. Smith insisted on having a set constructed that depicted the exterior of a cruise liner, in order to minimize shooting in front of green screens.

Triangle premiered at the London FrightFest Film Festival on 27 August 2009, and was released theatrically in the UK on 16 October 2009. The film received generally positive reviews from film critics and grossed $1.3–1.6 million worldwide.

== Plot ==
Jess prepares to take her autistic son Tommy on a boat trip with her friend Greg. When Tommy becomes upset, she tells him that he just had a bad dream. Jess goes to a Florida harbor without Tommy, explaining that he is at school, and boards Greg's boat with his deckhand Victor, his married friends Sally and Downey, and Sally's friend Heather. On the boat she has a dream about crabs on a beach, and wakes up disturbed, but then she forgets what disturbed her. At sea, a storm approaches, and while Greg radios the Coast Guard, he listens to a distress signal from a woman pleading for help. She says that someone is killing everyone but is cut off before she can provide her location. The sudden storm capsizes the boat. Heather is swept away, but the others climb onto the overturned sailboat when the storm clears.

The five survivors board a passing ocean liner, the Aeolus. It appears to be deserted even though they saw the silhouette of a person aboard. Jess experiences a sense of déjà vu as they explore the ship. They find Jess's keys and fresh food in the dining room. Jess spots someone watching them and Victor gives chase. Jess and Greg find the words "go to theater" written in blood on a mirror, but Greg insists the crew must be playing a prank. Jess returns to the dining room, where the food is now rotting. Victor, with a head wound, tries to strangle Jess, but she fights him, and he collapses.

Jess hears gunfire and follows it to the ship's theater, where Greg lies dead from a gunshot. Sally and Downey say that Greg told them Jess shot him. Someone in a burlap mask shoots Sally and Downey. Jess runs, grabs an ax and disarms the shooter, who tells her, "You have to kill them; it's the only way to get home" before Jess knocks the masked shooter overboard.

Jess hears yelling and sees another copy of her group on Greg's boat, who spot her (as the earlier unidentified figure). This new set of passengers boards the ship. They spot her after she drops her keys, and she attempts to warn the new Victor when he chases her, only to accidentally injure his head on a wall hook. She finds dozens of her own lockets and notes in her own handwriting telling her to kill them all. She takes a shotgun and confronts the new group, intending to "change the pattern", but a third Jess shoots the new Greg and stabs the new Downey and Sally.

The old Jess chases the new Sally, who sends the distress signal heard on Greg's boat. Jess catches up to her on a deck filled with dozens of Sally's corpses, and Sally succumbs to her wound as, below them, the new Jess kills the third Jess. The overturned boat returns again with another copy of her group, and the old Jess realizes the loop restarts once everyone is killed. Desperate to stop the loop, she sets the loop into motion by writing on the mirror in blood, dumping bodies overboard, and telling the latest Sally and Downey to go to the theater. She then arms herself, dresses in the shooter's outfit, and puts on a burlap mask. After she shoots the latest group and is disarmed, she urges the latest Jess to kill everyone, before being knocked overboard.

She awakens near crabs on a beach, having washed ashore, and she discovers that it is earlier that morning. She returns home and watches from outside her house as her earlier self yells abusively and strikes Tommy out of frustration with his autism. She distracts her counterpart with the doorbell, then kills her, and tells Tommy that he just had a bad dream. She puts the bagged body in her car's trunk and leaves with Tommy, vowing to him that things will change.

A seagull hits their windshield and dies, but after she tosses it off the road, she sees there's a pile of many dead seagulls. Realizing she is still trapped in the loop, Jess hurriedly drives away, but crashes into a truck, killing Tommy. A taxi driver approaches her. Jess asks him to take her to the harbour, evidently hoping to bring back her son. The driver tells her he will wait for her, and she promises him that she will return. Exhausted, she joins the others on Greg's boat, starting the loop again.

== Cast ==
- Melissa George as Jess
- Michael Dorman as Greg
- Rachael Carpani as Sally
- Henry Nixon as Downey
- Emma Lung as Heather
- Liam Hemsworth as Victor
- Joshua McIvor as Tommy
- Bryan Probets as Cab Driver

== Production ==
=== Development ===
Smith began developing a screenplay for a horror film set aboard an ocean liner, and cited The Twilight Zone and Back to the Future (1985) as inspirations for the time loop-themed narrative; in particular, he was influenced by the final sequence in the latter film, in which Marty McFly observes his future self. Smith was also inspired by Dead of Night and Memento, adding: "I wanted to make a cyclical film that explored Déjà vu avoiding using the same elements seen in Jacob's Ladder." The film is also based in part on the story of Sisyphus, a figure from Greek mythology cursed to repeatedly push a boulder up a hill without ever successfully reaching the top. Smith stated in a 2024 interview that he felt the ultimate theme of the film was regret, and "not being able to change something you've done."

A British-Australian co-production, Triangle was partly financed by the U.K. Film Council, which contributed £1.6 million of public money from the National Lottery fund towards the development, production and distribution of the film. The production team consisted of Jason Newmark and Julie Baines from Dan Films-UK and Chris Brown from Pictures in Paradise. Icon Entertainment handled international distribution.

=== Casting ===
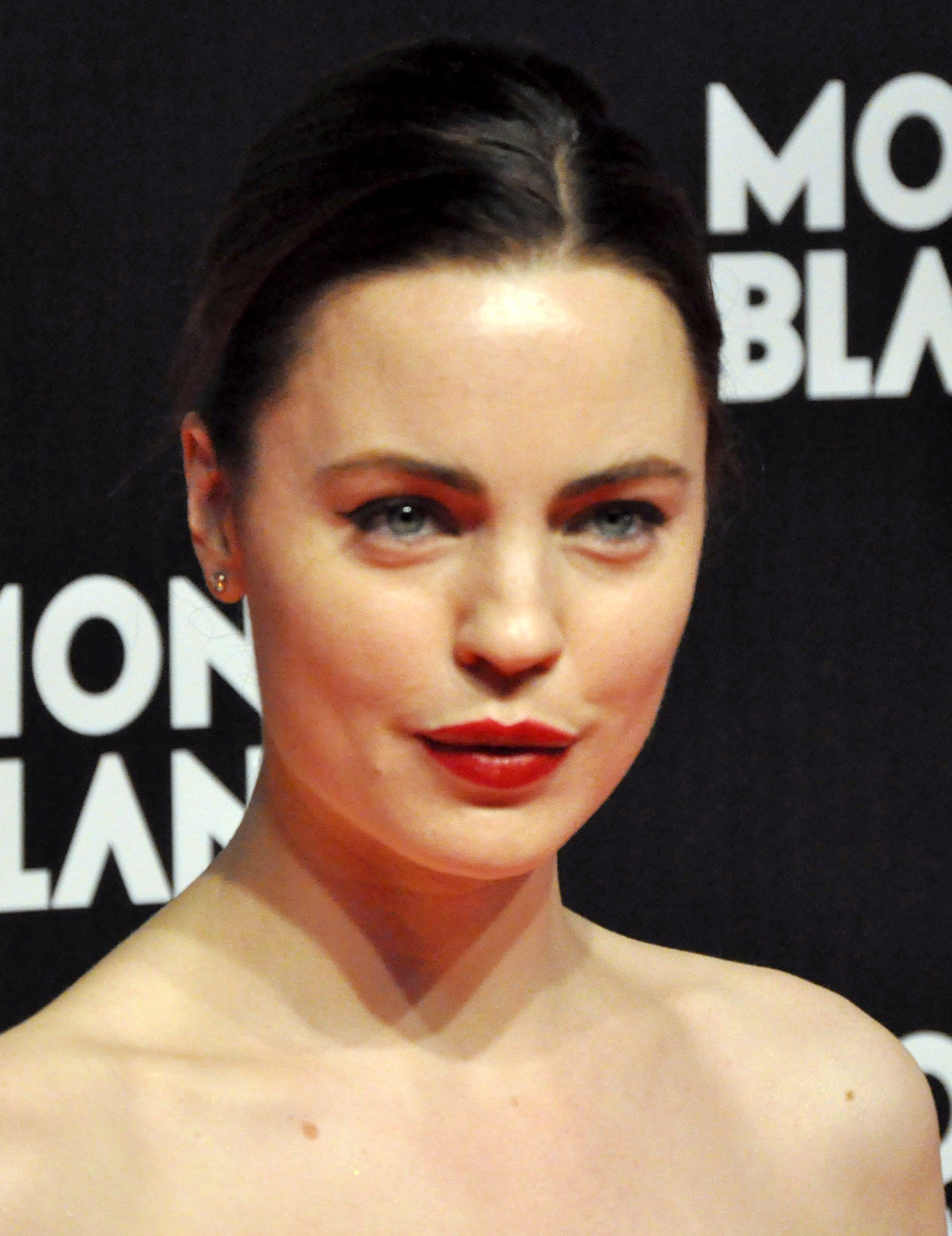
Melissa George (pictured in 2010) was cast in the lead role of Jess

The director chose Melissa George for the lead role after seeing her in the television series In Treatment, where she plays a young woman who feels a deep attraction for her psychotherapist. George's casting was announced in February 2008.

=== Filming ===
Although set in the American city of Miami, Florida, it was filmed in Brisbane and the Gold Coast, in the Australian state of Queensland, with a cast of mostly Australian actors. The sets include the exterior of a cruise ship, which Smith insisted on building as he considered it important not to overuse the use of green screens. Smith cited The Shining (1980) as a visual inspiration for the appearance of the ship's interiors.

Principal photography began in April 2008. The writer-director wanted to maintain the link and, to do so, baptized the housing estate where Jess lives "Sunshine State", a nickname used for both Florida and Queensland.

To edit the sequence in which the camera passes through the mirror "following" the actress, Smith acknowledged having been inspired by one of the final shots of The Woman in the Window, by Fritz Lang.

== Release ==
Triangle premiered at the London FrightFest Film Festival on 27 August 2009. It was released theatrically in the United Kingdom on 16 October 2009, in Belgium on 30 December 2009, and in the Netherlands on 21 January 2010. It opened in Australia on 29 April 2010.

It did not receive a theatrical release in the United States, though it did screen at Screamfest in Los Angeles on 24 October 2009.

=== Home media ===
Icon Home Entertainment released Triangle on DVD and Blu-ray in the UK on 1 March 2010, with features including a commentary track by director Smith. First Look Studios distributed the film on DVD and Blu-ray in the US, releasing it on 2 February 2010. The American discs do not include the commentary track, nor some of the other extras on the British releases.

The Australian label Umbrella Entertainment released a limited collector's edition Blu-ray set on 9 October 2024.

== Reception ==
=== Box office ===
Triangle grossed $894,985 in the United Kingdom, and $1,303,598 total worldwide.

=== Critical response ===
On the review aggregator website Rotten Tomatoes, 78% of 37 critics' reviews are positive, with an average rating of 6.5/10. The website's consensus reads: "Triangle sails into some strange waters, but this intelligent, well-acted horror outing anchors its idiosyncrasies in a satisfyingly scary story."

Empire gave the film a 4/5 stars rating and called it a "satisfying mind-twister, with an unexpectedly poignant pay-off". Variety said that Triangle only makes some kind of sense on its own fantastic level. Time Out London reviewer Nigel Floyd praised George's "fearless, credible performance" that "grounds the madness in a moving emotional reality". The Guardian critic, Philip French compared it to a "Möbius strip" in which the viewer "wonders how Smith will keep things going" and added the viewer will "leave his picture suitably shaken". Fellow Guardian critic Peter Bradshaw wrote that Triangle is a "smart, interestingly constructed scary movie", complimenting Smith for "creating some real shivers".

Entertainment.ie's Mike Sheridan was less impressed. Although he praised George's acting, he wrote that her performance "can't shield the fact that this still an exceptionally non-scary horror, that will have you scratching your head more than jumping out of your seat", ultimately rating it 2/5 stars. Alistair Harkness of The Scotsman called it "a trickily plotted and slickly made effort that nevertheless can't quite make its premise fly in gripping enough fashion".

== See also ==
- Death Ship
- List of films featuring time loops
