= S.O.Z. Soldados o Zombies =

- Genre: Horror
- Created by: Nicolas Entel; Miguel Tejada Flores
- Directed by: Rigoberto Castañeda
- Composer: Christian Basso
- Country of origin: Mexico
- Original language: Spanish
- No. of episodes: 8

Production
- Production companies: Dynamo; Red Creek Productions

Original release
- Network: Amazon Prime Video
- Release: August 6, 2021

S.O.Z. Soldados o Zombies (English: S.O.Z. Soldiers or Zombies) is a Mexican horror fiction television series created by Nicolas Entel, and Miguel Tejada Flores. The first season consisted of 8 episodes and premiered in 2021 on Amazon Prime Video. The series was produced by Dynamo and Red Creek Productions, and starred Sergio Peris-Mencheta, Fátima Molina, Horacio García Rojas, Nery Arredondo, and Adria Morales.

== Plot ==
The plot revolves around the legendary drug trafficker Alonso Marroquín (Sergio Peris-Mencheta), who, with his son Lucas (Nery Arredondo) escapes from a high-security Mexican prison and finds refuge in Paradiso, a remote drug rehabilitation facility located on the American side of the border. Meanwhile, the bodies of experimental piglets, who were victims of a failed military experiment by the U.S., are abandoned near the border, and then revived as mutant zombies. In the search for Alonso and his son, the Mexican special forces team is infected by mutant zombies, becoming a zombie army. Alerted by the imminent threat that this new species represents for humanity, the United States Army embarks on a mission to annihilate them.

== Cast ==
- Sergio Peris-Mencheta as Alonso Marroquín
- Nery Arredondo as Lucas
- Fátima Molina
- Horacio García Rojas
- Adria Morales
- Toby Schmitz as Agustus Snowman
