= Luke Elliot =

American singer-songwriter and composer

- Born: June 30, 1984 (age 42); Princeton, New Jersey, United States
- Genre: Rock
- Occupations: Singer, Songwriter
- Instruments: Vocals, Guitar, Piano
- Website: lukeelliot.com

Luke Elliot (born June 30, 1984) is an American musician, producer, and actor.

== Biography ==
Luke Elliot was born in Princeton, New Jersey, the second of five children, to Lorna Silver, a poet, and Norbert Elliot, an English language professor. He grew up in Lawrence Township, Mercer County, New Jersey. He currently resides in Majorstua (Oslo), Norway.

== Career ==
Playing in New York's Lower East Side, Elliot and his band made their way from the small bar scene to some of New York's more popular venues. Director Paul Cantagallo asked Elliot to compose the music for his film, Benny the Bum, which won Best Local Film at the 2012 Philadelphia Independent Film Festival. Elliot began headlining Philadelphia venues such as North Star and World Cafe Live. After a chance meeting with an influential journalist led to his music being promoted in Norway's biggest daily newspaper, Elliot traveled for the first time outside of the U.S. to Norway in 2014.

There, he formed a band, toured the country, and recorded his debut album, Dressed for the Occasion with producer John Agnello in Halden, Norway at Athletic Studio. The album was released in 2015, and they toured Europe and the world to enthusiastic response. Soon after, he moved permanently to Oslo, met and married a Norwegian woman, and had a child.

Elliot's sophomore album, The Big Wind, released in 2020. “These songs have to do with a pull to come into a stable existence,” Elliot explains. “While writing them, I had no permanent residence, but I stopped being a mess and I scrambled to get this record done.”

Rolling Stone France picked The Big Wind as its "Album Of The Month" upon release and referred to Elliot as an "undeniable talent combined with a truly stunning voice." MOJO Magazine in the UK called him “…a master of accessible, twisted, gothic Americana.”

Elliot is also an accomplished actor and has appeared in several Norwegian productions, alongside Carrie-Anne Moss in the hit series Wisting. He has also been featured in Thomas Giersten’s Helt perfekt, Øystein Karlsen’s series Exit and narrated for Gry Hivju’s Fearless, starring collaborator and friend, Kristofer Hivju.

== Style and influences ==
Elliot has been described as having a dark crooning style, with a traditional, melancholic and melodic sound. He has garnered favorable comparisons to roots, folk, and rock icons such as Hank Williams, Big Joe Turner, PJ Harvey, and Nick Cave.

== Discography ==
- Provisions (2014)
- Dressed for the Occasion (2016)
- The Big Wind (2020)
- Let ‘em All Talk (2023)
