= Down Under (2016 film) =

- Theatrical film poster
- Directed by: Abe Forsythe
- Written by: Abe Forsythe
- Produced by: Jodi Matterson
- Starring: Damon Herriman; Lincoln Younes; Alexander England
- Cinematography: Lachlan Milne
- Edited by: Drew Thompson
- Music by: Piers Burbrook de Vere
- Release date: 11 August 2016
- Running time: 88 minutes
- Country: Australia
- Language: English

Down Under is an Australian black comedy drama film set in the aftermath of the 2005 Cronulla riots. It is written and directed by Abe Forsythe.

== Cast ==
- Damon Herriman as Jason
- Lincoln Younes as Hassim
- Alexander England as Shit-Stick
- David Field as Vic
- Marshall Napier as Graham Sheather
- Rahel Romahn as Nick
- Michael Denkha as Ibrahim
- Chris Bunton as Evan
- Fayssal Bazzi as D-Mac
- Justin Rosniak as Ditch
- Harriet Dyer as Stacey
- Josh McConville as Gav
- Dylan Young as Az
- Christiaan Van Vuuren as Doof
- Anthony Taufa as Taufa
- Robert Rabiah as Amir
- Arka Das as Steve
- Josef Ber as Police Officer
- Josh Quong Tart as Police Officer / Video Porn Star
- John Ibrahim as Middle-Eastern Man in Gucci Hat

== Reception ==
On review aggregator Rotten Tomatoes, the film holds an approval rating of 63% based on 19 reviews, with an average rating of 6.6/10.

=== Accolades ===
| Award | Category | Subject | Result |
|---|---|---|---|
| AACTA Awards (6th) | Best Original Screenplay | Abe Forsythe | Nominated |
| AACTA Awards (6th) | Best Supporting Actor | Damon Herriman | Nominated |
| AFCA Award | Best Film | Jodi Matterson | Nominated |
| CGA Award | Best Casting in a Feature Film | Kirsty McGregor | Won |
| CGA Award | Best Casting in a Feature Film | Stevie Ray | Won |
| Fantastic Fest | Best Picture | Abe Forsythe | Won |
| Fantastic Fest | Best Director | Abe Forsythe | Won |
