= Tamarama Rock Surfers =

Australian Theatre Company

The Tamarama Rock Surfers was an independent theatre company that operated out of the Old Fitzroy Theatre in Sydney, Australia, and beyond. After 18 years, the group ceased trading in December 2015 due to lack of funding.

== History ==
The Tamarama Rock Surfers were founded in December 1994 by Jeremy Cumpston, Zena Cumptson and Michael Gwynne. When they produced the James Gaddas play Shadow Boxing in Adelaide at the Kings Theatre, with Jeremy Cumpston in the lead role. The idea for the company came about when Jeremy, Zena and Michael, dreamed of a stand alone independent theatre company making theatre beyond mainstream stages. The story behind the name is open to conjecture yet it is believed to have come from the summers spent jumping off the rocks at Tamarama Beach freestyle without anything except a desire to swim beyond the breakers. Post that many of the subsequent members embraced being a "surfer"...more metaphysical than anything else...yet the name embraced the idea of being free. The Tamarama Rock Surfers also founded the Old Fitzroy Theatre, Woolloomooloo in 1997 after sell-out season in Sydney of the play Road written by Jim Cartwright and performed at the Lansdowne Hotel. Following that success all of the performers donated the profits of the production to establish the Old Fitzroy Theatre. The first production TRS staged at the Old Fitz was Diary of a Madman - produced by Jeremy Cumpston, directed by Simon Lyndon designed by Imogen Ross and featuring actors Alan Morris and Bojana Novakovic.(Edited by journalist and documentary filmmaker Ted McDonnell, who interviewed one of the founders in December 2019 - who stated previous entries were based on myth, not fact)

Since its inception, the Company produced over 200 main stage productions and premiered 130 new Australian plays. The company was led by artists such as Jeremy Cumpston, Ansuya Nathan, Zena Cumpston, Leland Keene, Kar Charmers and Alan Flower.

In 2011, Rock Surfers with the help of Waverley Council, moved to a larger venue at the Bondi Pavilion. Not confined to the space, the Rock Surfers have also performed in the Studio venue of the Sydney Opera House.

The company has also been the start of many other independent Australian theatre companies. It has also started many theatre careers like Tim Minchin, Kate Mulvany, Toby Schmitz, Sarah Goodes, Ewen Leslie, Suzie Miller, Iain Sinclair, Sarah Giles, Josh Lawson, Brendan Cowell, Blazey Best, Jason Clarke and Sarah Snook.

== Artists and performers ==
Many talented Australian actors, both veterans and newcomers, perform in plays at the Old Fitzroy Theatre, such as Bojana Novakovic, Beejan Olfat, Jeremy Cumpston, Simon Burke, Pippa Grandison, Toby Schmitz, Victoria Hill, Damon Herriman, Mouche Phillips, Carole Skinner, Leah Vandenberg and Danny Adcock. In addition, many notable directors have recognised the space as one of Sydney's finest intimate venues, among them David Field, Simon Lyndon, Jason Clarke, Brendan Cowell, Van Badham, Jeremy Sims, Alan Flower, Zena Cumpston, Ansuya Nathan, Jeremy Cumpston, Leland Keane, Joel Edgerton, Leeanna Walsman and Nick Enright.

== Productions and awards ==
2002 saw the introduction of the innovative 'late shows'. Running on Sunday nights after the scheduled performance, the space was opened up to a variety of performances such as cabaret, multi-media, music and dance.

2006 - A particular highlight of the season was Sue Smith's Thrall, directed by current CEO Leland Kean, starring Peta Sergeant, John McNeill, Tamara Cook and Bryce Youngman. "Sue Smith's beautiful, evocative and erotic play understands the necessary seduction of narrative set-up but, even better, knows how to develop bigger and universal ideas inside the reductive machinery of plot. It's a grounded work in which the thematic ideas transcend the narrative"

2008 was a mixed year for the Company with the success of Toby Schmitz's Cu*t Pi, and the sudden tragic loss of company member Mark Priestley.

The 2009 season opened with the Philip Ridley play Vincent River, starring Beejan Land and Elaine Hudson to encouraging reviews, "In a period of heatwaves in Sydney (turning the Fitz into an oven) and the distractions of the Sydney Festival, these two have risen above all to grip audiences by the throat and not let go for a minute." TRS continually collaborate with other independent production companies both nationally and internationally.

== Demise ==
Lack of funding and some other uncertainties, forced the Rock Surfers Company into voluntary liquidation in December 2015. The company depended on support from foundations, individuals and investment from local and government bodies as ticket sales only covered a fraction of their costs. There are no immediate plans to reopen but there is some optimism within the company for a comeback in the future.
