= Bondi Pavilion =

Pavilion in Sydney, Australia

Coordinates: 33°53′24.64″S 151°16′37.51″E

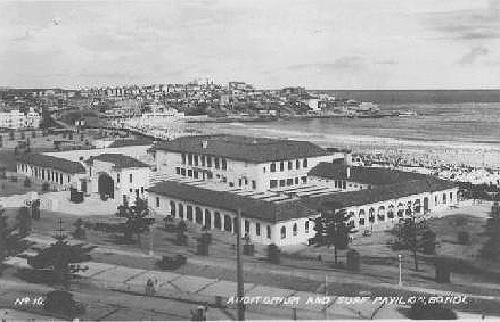
Bondi Surf Pavilion circa 1930

The Bondi Surf Pavilion is a beachside banqueting house in Bondi Beach, an eastern suburb of Sydney, New South Wales, Australia. It is an outstanding beach cultural icon of Australia, together with the beach, park and surf lifesaving club. The structure is listed on the NSW State Heritage Register 01786 as well as by Waverley Council. The building has also been listed by the Heritage Council. According to the National Trust it "has come to represent the Australian culture of beach bathing and outdoors living".

The pavilion was constructed in 1928–29, and is managed by Waverley Council. It includes the Bondi Pavilion Theatre, opened in 1974.

== Background ==
Sea bathing gradually changed from a restricted dangerous activity in NSW to a popular pastime in the later 19th century. Bondi Beach was opened to the public as a pleasure grounds for picnicking in 1855. The beach was dedicated as a public reserve in 1882, and Waverley Council built and opened ocean baths there in 1889 and a bathing shed in 1903. Bondi Surf Lifesaving Club was established in 1906. People went to the beach for a picnic, but they seldom went swimming. Waverley Council agreed to the construction of two dressing sheds in 1905 – one for men and one for women (the ladies' shed is shown in the centre photo below) – although it soon became apparent that these sheds were not adequate, as they seem to have lacked roofs. One lady complained in 1910 that people passing in the tram could see those in the sheds dressing and undressing. Consequently, Waverley Council asked for tenders for the structure and accepted a bid for £3,000 submitted by Taylor and Bills. The new sheds were completed in 1911 and were affectionately dubbed 'The Castle' or 'Castle Pavilion' in reference to the distinctive turrets. The new dressing shed is pictured below (far right photo) and was described in detail in the Sydney Morning Herald:

Bondi now boasts not only the most up-to-date surf bathers' accommodation in the State but also the Commonwealth. It is provided with facilities for 1000 bathers and [the building] is divided into two sections providing accommodation for 750 men and 250 women. Bathers' compartments are separated by asbestos sheet partitioning and the floor is wholly of concrete to ensure cleanliness. Besides shower-baths and other necessities for bathers the front of the building is devoted to the purposes of a tea-room which is capable of holding a large number of persons while wide verandahs on the seaward side are also designed for tea parties.

Bondi Beach circa 1900, before surf bathing became popular	The ladies dressing sheds at Bondi, built about 1905	Bondi dressing sheds built in 1911

== Construction ==
Surf bathing had become a mass leisure pursuit after World War One. In 1923 Waverley Council commenced the implementation of the Bondi Beach and Park Improvement Scheme. The scheme included provision of a kiosk and surf sheds, three lavatory blocks, a band stand, parks to surround the buildings and increased car and pedestrian facilities. A competition was held to design the structures and was won by the architectural firm of Robertson and Marks.

The foundation stone marking the commencement of the project was laid in May 1928. In OctoberThe Sydney Morning Herald photographed the building, which was still under construction, as shown below.

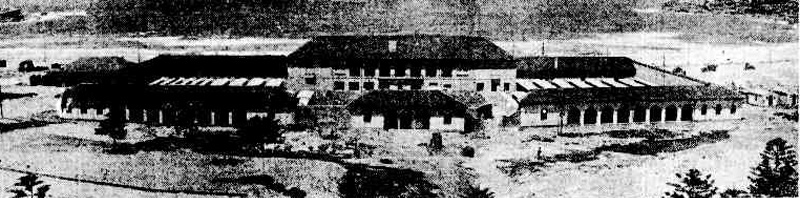
Bondi Pavilion under construction in October 1928

The pavilion was a very ambitious project. It had extensive dressing cubicles, which were originally in two courtyards on the ground floor of the building. One courtyard was for men and the other for women, and the individual changing booths were constructed in rows in each courtyard. These rows within the courtyards can be seen in the photograph above. It also had Turkish and hotwater baths, shops, a ballroom, cabaret theatre, an auditorium and a cafe. Tunnels leading from the two courtyards passed underneath Marine Parade (now Queen Elizabeth Drive) to a pair of concrete groynes which opened onto the beach.

The pavilion was not officially opened until the end of 1929. However, by October 1928 the project was sufficiently completed to allow people to use the dressing accommodation. The council placed the advertisement shown below, outlining the attractions of Bondi.

Newspaper advertisement outlining the attractions of Bondi Beach, October 1928	Surf bathers at Bondi Beach, October 1928

== Opening ==
The official opening of the Bondi Beach improvement scheme was held on 21 December 1929. The Sydney Morning Herald outlined the event in detail:

A great crowd attended the official opening of the Bondi Beach improvement scheme by the Mayor of Waverley (Alderman D Hunter) on Saturday afternoon. Bondi was permeated with music all through the day and evening. There were brass bands, fife and drum bands and bugle bands and when there was no band playing loud speakers took their place. A little after noon King Neptune landed from a surf boat in front of the pavilion where he was welcomed by the Mayoress. His majesty brought a number of balloons and these were eagerly struggled for by hundreds of children. The beach was alive with surfers and sea nymphs, Girl Guides and Boy Scouts and thousands of spectators. It was estimated that there were between 160,000 and 200,000 people present, the marine drive, promenade and the sands being covered by a dense mass of pleasure seekers.

A photo of some of the beach improvements is shown below. Some of the material commissioned by the council to promote Bondi is also shown.

Poster commissioned in 1929 by the council to promote Bondi	Some of the beach improvements shortly before the official opening in December 1929	Booklet by the council promoting Bondi Beach

== Popularity ==
The Bondi Pavilion was well utilised for about two decades after its opening. During the war the first floor, where the Esplanade Cabaret had been, was requisitioned by the American Red Cross and the U.S. military to become an officers' club until the end of the war. After the war, dances were organised at the pavilion, and the proceeds went to disadvantaged Australian returned soldiers. In 1948 the pavilion obtained a liquor licence.

== 1950s-1970s ==
By the mid-1950s utilisation of the pavilion had begun to decline, as changes in bathing costumes from heavy material to nylon reduced the need for changing rooms. In 1955 the council reported a substantial operating loss for the building. During the 1950s and 1960s the ground floor refreshment rooms were still in use and operated by lessees; however, the main hall and auditorium were rarely used.

In the early 1970s old Palm Court Ballroom space was transformed into a theatre, the Bondi Pavilion Theatre, which was opened in 1974 by Gough Whitlam.

In 1977 and 1978 the changing rooms, lockers, former Victorian-style Turkish baths and courtyard were demolished. In their place a new netball court, an art gallery, a gymnasium and an amphitheatre were constructed. In 1978 the building was officially reopened as the Bondi Surf Pavilion Community Centre.

== Today ==
On 22 June 1993, the Australian Heritage Commission added the Bondi Beach area to the Register of the National Estate. Today the pavilion is still a community centre where the accomplished French born dancer Jeanine Claes did teach from 1985 till 2001. It has a theatre, a gallery and rehearsal, meeting and function rooms. Many cultural and film festivals are held at the building, and shops, changing rooms and toilets are still available to the public but the Pavilion has been the subject of controversial development proposals that residents argue would change the area from a community and artistic one to a commercial one.

As of 2021 the Bondi Pavilion Theatre continues to host performances.
