= Old Fitzroy Theatre =

Pub theatre in Sydney, Australia

- Interactive map of Old Fitzroy Theatre
- Address: 129 Dowling Street
- Location: Woolloomooloo, Sydney
- Coordinates: 33°52′23″S 151°13′14″E

Construction
- Opened: 1997

The Old Fitzroy Theatre (also called the Old Fitz Theatre) is a pub theatre in Woolloomooloo in central Sydney, Australia.

The 58-seat venue was established by Jeremy Cumpston in 1997 in the cellar of the Old Fitzroy Hotel. It is known for independent productions featuring emerging artists. Many leading Australian theatre makers participated in plays at the theatre early in their careers. The theatre was managed until 2012 by Tamarama Rock Surfers, and since 2014 by Red Line Productions.

== History ==
In 2014, Red Line Productions was established marking a new chapter for the Old Fitzroy Theatre. Andrew Henry (Artistic Director,) Vanessa Wright (Executive Director), Seann Hawkins (Associate Producer.) Under Henry's artistic direction from 2014 to 2021, the theatre became a cornerstone of Sydney's independent theatre scene, presenting over 200 productions and attracting more than 550,000 patrons. Notable productions during this period included Angels in America, The Wolves, I Am My Own Wife, The Whale, and This Much Is True by Louis Nowra. In recognition, Henry received the Hayes Gordon Memorial Award for Outstanding Contribution to Australian Theatre.

Red Line Productions also commissioned over 20 new Australian works, including the world premieres of Degenerate Art by Toby Schmitz and King of Pigs by Steve Rogers. The theatre's final year under Henry's artistic leadership featured a landmark revival of The Chairs directed by Gale Edwards, starring Paul Capsis and iOTA, and a new production of A Streetcar Named Desire that won four Sydney Theatre Awards, including Best Independent Production.

In 2021, Red Line Productions expanded its artistic leadership, appointing Constantine Costi, Alexander Berlage, and Catherine Văn-Davies as co-artistic directors, while Henry transitioned to the role of creative producer.

In 2023, after nearly a decade of stewardship, Red Line Productions passed the management of the Old Fitzroy Theatre to New Ghosts Theatre Company, led by Artistic Director Lucy Clements and Executive Producer Emma Wright. Clements, who had previously served as a resident director at the theatre, brought a focus on new Australian works. Under their leadership, the theatre continues its legacy of presenting innovative independent productions.
