= Stables Theatre, Sydney =

Theatre in Sydney, Australia

The Stables Theatre is a 105-seat theatre in Darlinghurst, Sydney. The intimate theatre has a kite-shaped stage.

The theatre was built in 1970; 55 years ago, converting an old stables. It was originally called the Nimrod Street Theatre, giving its name to the Nimrod Theatre Company which originally performed there. The name changed to the Stables Theatre in 1975.

Griffin Theatre Company has been resident in the theatre since the early 1980s. It was purchased in 1986 by Rodney Seaborn when it was up for sale and risked demolition. He established a trust called the Seaborn, Broughton & Walford Foundation as owners, with his cousins Peter Broughton and Leslie Walford on the board.

The theatre is being renovated from 2024 to expand the stage and increase seating capacity to 140, alongside a new lift and on-site rehearsal space.
