= Noel Hodda =

Australian actor

- Born: 1954 (age 71–72); Albury, New South Wales, Australia
- Education: National Institute of Dramatic Art, UNSW Sydney (1980)
- Occupations: Actor; writer; dramaturge; director; teacher

Noel Hodda (born 1954) is an Australian actor, writer, dramaturge, director and teacher, he was born in Albury, New South Wales.

== Career ==
=== Acting and narration ===
Hodda was a founding member of the Riverina Theatre Company, located in Wagga Wagga and Project TYER, a Theatre In Education Co., for whom he also wrote and appeared in the play Strata Digger. Subsequently, he graduated from the National Institute of Dramatic Art (NIDA) at the UNSW Sydney and then worked as an actor for the Sydney Theatre Company, the Queensland Theatre Company, the Griffin Theatre Company, the Ensemble Theatre, the Q Theatre, Marian Street Theatre, Sport for Jove at the Seymour Centre and others. He also performed in major national and international tours, including The Removalists, Are You Lonesome Tonight?, The Club, Life of Galileo, Chasing the Dragon, Diving for Pearls and Dinner.

He has appeared in numerous Australian television series and tele-dramas as both a lead and guest character. His first major television gig was a regular role in the drama Sons and Daughters as Rob Keegan, from 1982 to 1984. He played celebrity TV doctor David Fielding in E Street from 1989 to 1991 and patriarch Ron O'Donnell in Out of the Blue in 2008. Hodda has also had guest roles in Neighbours, Janet King and Rake.

His film appearances include A Step in the Right Direction (1981), The Highest Honour (aka Heroes of the Krait/Southern Cross) (1982), Silver City (1984), Emoh Ruo (1985) and The Bet (2006) among others.

Hodda began recording books as a student at NIDA as a means of earning extra money. He became a long-standing narrator for Vision Australia from 1977 to 2009. In gaps between his work in the theatre, films and television, he has recorded hundreds of talking books for them, as well as the ABC and commercially. He has been shortlisted for several Talking Book Awards and won the National Library TDK Australian Audio Book Award for his narration of the novel Cold Mountain. He has also performed voiceover work for numerous advertisements.

=== Writing ===
Hodda has written and staged numerous plays including Issues Addressed, The Secret House, Half Safe, Photographs, On The Public Record, The Sculpture Garden, In This Light and Threat: Norma, Norm & the Dog. A selection of his plays titled "Plays: Noel Hodda" was published by Janus Imprint.

His play Later (eventually known as Across the Water) was chosen to be workshopped at the prestigious Banff playRites Colony, in Banff, Canada in 2004. His play Rehearsing Julie (now re-drafted and titled Manda) was nominated for a Silver Gull Play Award in 2024. His one act play Norma was made into a short film.

His television writing credits include episodes of the ABC TV G.P. drama.

Hodda was writer in residence both at Charles Sturt University School of Performing Arts and University of Wollongong Faculty of Creative Arts.

=== Directing and teaching ===
Hodda is an Honorary Life Member of Griffin Theatre Company, where he was a board member, Chairman of the Board, Director of D-Week and a member of the Literary Committee. Currently, he still acts, directs and teaches.

He assesses plays for Page to Stage (a young playwrights' organisation) and Parnassus' Den. He has also been a script assessor for the Australia Council for the Arts, The Australian National Playwright's Centre and Belvoir Street Theatre, and has conducted acting and writing workshops for many organisations. He has been Artist-In-Residence at Charles Sturt University in Wagga Wagga, and has also taught acting and voice there on short-term appointments, as well as at the University of Wollongong School of Performing Arts.

His dramaturgical work on the play Codgers by Don Reid contributed to that play winning the prestigious Rodney Seaborn Playwrights Award in 2006.

=== Music ===
Hodda was the bass player in two resident bands for Griffin Theatre Company in the 1980s – The Brian Roberts Big Band (jazz, blues and country) and The Fabulous Front Girls and their backing band The Coathangers (a surf band formed to play at a 1985 benefit rally against the closure of live theatres).

== Acting credits ==
=== Television ===
Year	Title	Role	Notes
1982	1915	Captain Barnes	Miniseries, 3 episodes
1982	Holiday Island	Georgio	
1983	M.P.S.I.B.	Kenneth	1 episode
1982–1987	Sons and Daughters	Rob Keegan	238 episodes
1984	Five Mile Creek	Mr Little	1 episode
1984	Bodyline	Vic Bradman	Miniseries, 2 episodes
1984	Cop Shop	Fermer	
1984–1992	A Country Practice	Gareth Spencer / Murray West / Col Herbert / Mystery Caller	8 episodes
1985	Wild & Woolley	Woolley	
1986	Cyclone Tracy	Lt. Tony Baker	TV miniseries, 3 episodes
1987–1988	Neighbours	Derek Morris	7 episodes
1989	Living with the Law	Rich	
1989–1991	E Street	Dr. David Fielding	182 episodes
1992	Shortland Street	Peter Sheldon	9 episodes
1995	G.P.	Mark Dowling	1 episode
1995	Blue Heelers	Inspector Harris	1 episode
1997	Big Sky	Doug Matthews	1 episode
1997	Heartbreak High	Bob Rainer	1 episode
1997–2000	Water Rats	Bobby Weaver / Simon Waverly	3 episodes
1998	McFeast	Elle's Dream Man	
2000	Murder Call	Jack Turkington	1 episode
2001	BackBerner	Various	1 episode
2001	Farscape	Charrid Leader	1 episode
2001; 2005	All Saints	Rob Kydd / Perry Anderson	2 episodes
2005	Pizza	PM's Head of Security	
2005	Blue Water High	George	1 episode
2007; 2017	Home and Away	David Mayvers / Tim Birch	2 episodes
2008–2009	Out of the Blue	Ron O'Donnell	68 episodes
2010	Mary Mackillop	Father Tappeiner	Documentary
2010	Tough Nuts: Australia’s Hardest Criminals	Police Inspector	
2014	Rake	Banking Commissioner	2 episodes
2014–2017	Janet King	Magistrate Hansford	3 episodes
2017	House of Bond	Judge	Miniseries, 2 episodes
2017	Friday on My Mind	Alexis Albert	Miniseries, 1 episode
2018	Dr Max	Lecturer	

=== Film ===
Year	Title	Role	Notes
1981	A Step in the Right Direction	Gary	TV movie
1982	The Highest Honour (aka Heroes of the Krait/Southern Cross)	Able Seaman M.M. Berryman	TV movie
1984	Silver City	Estonian man	Feature film
1985	Emoh Ruo	Pete	Feature film
1993	You and Me and Uncle Bob	Neville	TV movie
2000	Ihaka: Blunt Instrument	Wickham	TV movie
2006	The Bet	Brian	Feature film

=== Theatre ===
Year	Title	Role	Notes	Ref.
1976	How Does Your Garden Grow?	Brenda	Rivcol Dramaturg Club, Wagga with Stable Productions	
1977	Diamond Studs		Riverina Trucking Co	
1977–1978	The Removalists	Constable Neville Ross	Riverina Trucking Co	
1977–1978	Much Ado About Nothing	Messenger / Boy / Dogberry	Riverina Trucking Co	
1979	The Three Sisters		Jane St Theatre, Sydney with NIDA	
1979	The Caucasian Chalk Circle	Nephew	Sydney Opera House with NIDA & STC	
1979	Beyond Mozambique		NIDA Theatre, Sydney	
1979	The Love of a Good Man		Jane St Theatre, Sydney with NIDA	
1980	The Women Pirates Ann Bonny and Mary Read	Pierre / Thomas Deane	NIDA Theatre, Sydney, University of Newcastle, Playhouse, Canberra	
1980	Strife	Edgar Anthony	NIDA Theatre, Sydney	
1981	The Incredible Vanishing	Constable Jack Parker	Q Theatre, Penrith	
1981	The Circle	Edward Luton	SGIO Theatre, Brisbane with QTC	
1984	When Are We Going to Manly?	Colin	Stables Theatre, Sydney with Griffin Theatre Co	
1985	The Removalists	Kenny	Phillip St Theatre, Sydney	
1986–1987	Are You Lonesome Tonight?	Young Duke / Doctor / Company	Her Majesty's Theatre, Sydney, Festival Theatre, Adelaide	
1988	The Boys	Stevie Sprague	NIDA Parade Theatre, Sydney	
1991	Caravan	Pierce	Churchill Theatre, Bromley, Theatre Royal, Lincoln, Adam Smith Centre, Kirkcaldy, UK	
1992	The Common Day	Lenny	ANU, Canberra	
1994	Choice	Various roles	NSW tour with Riverina Theatre Co & Hunter Valley Theatre Co	
1995	Table for One	Nick	Wonderland Productions	
1995	The Club	Gerry	Marian St Theatre, Sydney with Northside Theatre Co	
1996	The Life of Galileo	Monk / Mathematician	Sydney Opera House with STC	
1998	Chasing the Dragon	Gavin	Wharf Theatre, Sydney with STC	
1999	Art		Theatre Royal Sydney with STC	
1999	Diving for Pearls	Ron	Ensemble Theatre, Sydney	
2000	Favourite Names for Boys	Les / Frank	Railway St Theatre	
2002	The Great Man	Rhys Rogers	Dunstan Playhouse, Adelaide with STCSA	
2003	A Conversation	Col Shorter	Australian tour	
2007	Dinner	Hal	Stables Theatre, Sydney	
2009	Blackbird	Ray	Acton St Theatre, Canberra	
2009	Embers	Various roles	Australian tour with HotHouse Theatre & STC	
2010	The God Committee	Fr. Charlie Dunbar	Ensemble Theatre, Sydney	
2011	The Dapto Chaser	Cess Sinclair	Illawarra Performing Arts Centre with Merrigong Theatre Co	
2012	Time Stands Still	Richard	Darlinghurst Theatre, Sydney	
2014	Charitable Intent	Brian	The Concourse, Sydney with Ensemble Theatre	
2015	The Secret House (reading)	Playwright	Bowen Library Theatrette, Sydney	
2015–2020	The Dapto Chaser	Arnold Denny	NSW tour & online	
2016	Three Sisters	Chebutykin	Seymour Centre, Sydney with Sport for Jove	
2017	Blackrock	2017 Stewart / Len / Roy	Seymour Centre, Sydney	
2018	Stalking the Bogeyman	David's father	Old Fitzroy Theatre, Sydney	
2023	Unprecedented	Various roles	VIC & NSW tour with HotHouse Theatre	
2023	The Lives of Eve	Paul	KXT On Broadway, Sydney	
2024	Seventeen	Tom	Seymour Centre, Sydney	
2024	Cut Chilli	Jeff	Old Fitzroy Theatre, Sydney	
2025	Heaven	Mal	The Loading Dock – Qtopia Sydney	
	Strata Digger		Project TYER, a Theatre In Education Co	

== Narration / voiceover ==
=== Audiobooks ===
Year	Title	Role	Ref.
1999	Cold Mountain	Narrator	
	The Hobbit	Narrator	
	The Lord of the Rings	Narrator	
	The Fortunes of Richard Mahony trilogy	Narrator	
	The Book Thief	Narrator	
2003	The Girl Green as Elderflower	Narrator	
2005	Scarecrow Army	Narrator	
2010	Things We Didn't See Coming	Narrator	
2013	The Breadmaker's Carnival	Narrator	
2020	The Ambassador	Narrator	
2021	Freedom Highway	Narrator	

=== Commercials ===
Title	Role	Ref.
Australian Capital Reserve	Voiceover	
Avis Budget Group	Voiceover	
BRW Rich List	Voiceover	
The Children’s Hospital at Westmead	Voiceover	
Frontline Plus	Voiceover	
Macquarie Bank	Voiceover	
Mercedes-Benz C-Class	Voiceover	
Westfield Group	Voiceover	

== Writer / director credits ==
=== Television ===
Year	Title	Role	Notes
1994; 1996	G.P.	Writer	2 episodes

=== Theatre ===
Year	Title	Role	Notes
1985	Yeah, But Is It Funny?: The Gummy Man in Search of Love / Issues Addressed	Director	Stables Theatre, Sydney with Griffin Theatre Company
1980s	Issues Addressed	Co-writer / Director	Griffin Theatre Company
1986	Crosscuts – A Rock and Roll Cabaret	Director	Stables Theatre, Sydney with Griffin Theatre Company
1987–1989	The Secret House	Playwright	Stables Theatre, Sydney, Anthill Theatre, Melbourne, The Hole in the Wall Theatre, Perth with Griffin Theatre Company
1990	Half Safe	Playwright	Riverina Playhouse, Wagga Wagga, Stables Theatre, Sydney with Griffin Theatre Company
	Photographs	Playwright	Charles Sturt University School of Performing Arts
	On The Public Record	Playwright	University of Wollongong Faculty of Creative Arts
2004; 2013	Later (renamed Across the Water)	Playwright	playRites Colony, Banff, Canada, Laguna Community Hall with Valley Artists
2006	Codgers	Dramaturg	
2013	The Secret House	Playwright	National Theatrette, Melbourne with Australian National Theatre
2015	The Secret House (reading)	Playwright	Bowen Library Theatrette, Sydney
2018	The Sculpture Garden	Playwright	Laguna Community Hall with Valley Artists Inc
2022	In This Light	Playwright / Producer	Flight Path Theatre, Sydney with Ca Va Productions
	Threat: Norma, Norm & the Dog	Playwright	Later made into a short film directed by the writer
2025	Manda (formerly Rehearsing Julie)	Writer	Actors Benevolent Fund, Sydney
	Strata Digger		Project TYER, a Theatre In Education Co
	Never a Moment's Peace		East Coast Theatre Company

== Awards and nominations ==
Year	Work	Award	Category	Result	Ref.
1999	Cold Mountain	National Library TDK Australian Audio Book Awards	Unabridged Fiction Award	Won	
2016	Three Sisters	Glugs Theatrical Awards	Best Supporting Actor	Nominated	
2024	Rehearsing Julie (now re-drafted and titled Manda)	Silver Gull Awards	The Silver Gull Play Award	Nominated	
