= Anne Looby =

Australian actress

- Education: National Institute of Dramatic Art
- Occupations: Actress; stage director; playwright
- Years active: 1989–present
- Known for: Disgrace (2008), Babies (mini-series)
- Notable work: A Country Practice as Anna "Lacey" Newman

Anne Looby is an Australian actress, producer and stage director. She is known for playing character roles in TV serials.

== Career ==
=== Screen ===
Since graduating from NIDA in 1988, Looby has worked in theatre, television and film. She appeared in the serial A Country Practice as vet Anna "Lacey" Newman and All Saints as Julie Archer and the award-winning ABC mini-series Simone de Beauvoir's Babies. She was awarded the AFI for Best Actress in a mini-series for this role.

She has appeared in the feature films Daydream Believer (1992), Willful (2001) and with John Malkovich in Disgrace.

=== Stage ===
In 2007, Looby was in Company in the role of Joanna. She appeared in the play Arcadia, winning the Sydney Critic Award.

Looby directed the stage productions of Hi-5 House Hits for international touring in 2014, followed by Hi-5 House of Dreams touring production in 2015. Between 2012 and 2016, she directed school productions of A Midsummer Night's Dream, Much Ado About Nothing and Twelfth Night. In addition, Anne has been assistant director at ACA for the 2012, 2014 productions of Reality Bytes.

Between 2006 and 2011, Looby conceived, developed and produced Breast Wishes.

She has taught acting-for-camera and Shakespeare for Beginners at both the NIDA summer school and Theatre Nepean UWS. She has also been a drama coach for HSC drama students.

Looby was a member of the NIDA Board of Studies for 11 years and is a member of the Actors Centre Australia Advisory Board and member of the Sydney arts community and has been a member of MEAA for 30 years.

== Filmography ==
=== Film ===
Year	Title	Role	Type
1991	Strangers	Anna	TV movie
1992	Over the Hill	TV reporter	Feature film
1992	Daydream Believer	Margo	Feature film
2005	Alex's Party	Laura	Short film
2007	Frail	Mother	Short film
2007	Hammer Bay	Lauren Clarke	TV film
2008	Disgrace	Rosalind	Feature film

=== Television ===
Year	Title	Role	Type
1985	Star Search	Contestant with Phillip Stammers (Winner)	TV series
1989	Rafferty's Rules	Katherie Dever	TV series
1991	Embassy	Kate	TV series
1990	A Country Practice	Jennifer Rose	TV series
1992–1993	A Country Practice	Anna Lacey Newman	TV series, 148 episodes
1994	G.P.	Grace	TV series
1996	Heartbreak High	Dana	TV series
1997	Simone de Beauvoir's Babies	Louise	TV miniseries
1997–1998	Wildside	Carla Wallace	TV series
1999	See How They Run	Lilly Morton/Cassidy	TV series
2000	Water Rats	Gabrielle Lloyd McMahon	TV series
2001	Willful	Katya	
2001	Corridors of Power	Caroline Fielding	TV series
2003	Always Greener	Margaret Milne	TV series
2003–2004	All Saints	Julie Archer	TV series
2012	Underbelly	Anthony’s Barrister	TV series
2013	Power Games: The Packer-Murdoch War	Florence Packer	TV miniseries
2010–2013	Dance Academy	Dr. Wicks	TV series
2016	Rake	Stella	TV series
2017	House of Bond	Kathleen Bond	TV miniseries

== Theatre ==
=== As actor ===
Year	Title	Role	Type
	Mack and Mabel		Amateur production
1984	The Rocky Horror Show	Janet Weiss	Bathurst, Rialto Theatre Brisbane, Theatre Royal
1985	Tommy		Newcastle Panthers Club
1987	Undiscovered Country		NIDA Theatre
1988	Veneer 2		UNSW Parade Theatre
1988	5th of July		UNSW Parade Theatre
1989	Hello		Wharf Theatre
1989-90	The Rover		Playhouse Adelaide, Seymour Centre
1990	The Imaginary Invalid		NIDA Theatre
1990	Macbeth		NIDA Theatre
1991	Twelfth Night		Playhouse Newcastle
1991	Mongrels		Ensemble Theatre
1993	The Shaughraun (aka The Lovable Rascal)		Suncorp Theatre, Brisbane
1994	King Lear	Gonerill	Sydney Opera House with Sydney Theatre Company
1994	Arcadia	Lady Croom	Sydney Opera House with Sydney Theatre Company (Won Sydney Theatre Critics Award)
1994-95	The Shaughraun (aka The Lovable Rascal)	Claire Ffolliott	Playhouse, Melbourne, Sydney Opera House with Melbourne Theatre Company / Sydney Theatre Company
1996	Macbeth	Lady Macbeth	Wharf Theatre with Sydney Theatre Company
2006	The Peach Season	Celia	Stables Theatre with Griffin Theatre Company (Nominated for Helpmann Award)
2007	Company	Joanna	Theatre Royal (Nominated for Sydney Theatre Award)
2009	Breast Wishes	Carol	Seymour Centre, IMB Theatre Wollongong, Riverside Theatres Parramatta, Newcastle Civic Theatre, Playhouse Canberra, His Majesty's Theatre, Perth
	Digger		Festival Theatre with State Theatre Company of South Australia

=== As director / creator ===
Year	Title	Role	Type
2009	Breast Wishes	Creator / Producer	Seymour Centre, IMB Theatre Wollongong, Riverside Theatres Parramatta, Newcastle Civic Theatre, Playhouse Canberra, His Majesty's Theatre, Perth
2011	Breast Wishes	Creator / Producer	Clocktower Centre Melbourne
2012, 2014	Reality Bytes	Assistant Director	ACA
2014	Hi-5 House Hits	Director	Australian, Asian & UAE tour
2015	Hi-5 House of Dreams	Director	Australian & Asian tour
	A Midsummer Night's Dream	Director	School production
	Twelfth Night	Director	School production
	Much Ado About Nothing	Director	School production
2016	Breast Wishes	Creator / Producer	Basement Theatre, Gold Coast
