= Wendy Strehlow =

Australian actress

- Born: 1958 (age 67–68); Rockhampton, Queensland, Australia
- Education: Flinders University (1977–1978); National Institute of Dramatic Art (1980; 1993)
- Occupations: Actress (theatre and television)
- Years active: 1979–present
- Known for: A Country Practice (TV series) as Judy Loveday; All Saints (TV series) as Lorraine Tanner
- Family: Sophie Hensser (daughter)

Wendy Strehlow (c. 1958) is an Australian television and theatre actress, best known for her role as Judy Loveday in A Country Practice.

== Early life and education ==
Strehlow grew up in the outback outside Rockhampton, in Queensland. She is Jewish, and her family originally migrated to Australia from Europe. Strehlow's considers that her family name may have been anglicised from 'Stralov'. She had a large extended family, who were farmers and ran a bakery.

She took ballet lessons from the age of four, before joining Rockhampton Little Theatre at age 11, where she played Puck in A Midsummer Night's Dream, cementing her love for acting. She went on to study drama at Flinders University in South Australia in 1977, and graduated the following year, in 1978. She then studied a Bachelor of Dramatic Art in Acting at Sydney's NIDA, graduating in 1980.

In 1993, Strehlow studied a post-graduate course in Movement Studies at NIDA, and has since taught Movement, Text and Acting for Camera at NIDA, Australian Theatre for Young People and Western Australian Academy of Performing Arts (WAAPA).

== Career ==
Strehlow has appeared in numerous television series. She was cast in the 1982 TV movie A Step in the Right Direction, straight out of NIDA. She then won the role of much-loved nurse sister Judy Loveday in the soap opera A Country Practice from the pilot episode in 1981. Her character did not appear for some time, because while they were waiting to see if the series was greenlit, Strehlow was offered a year of work with the South Australian Theatre Company and a role in For the Term of His Natural Life. She was, however, asked back to continue playing Judy at the end of that year, and went on to appear as the character until 1986, for 217 episodes. The role won her a Logie Award for Best Supporting Actress in 1985.

After her tenure on A Country Practice, Strehlow won the role of Eliza Doolittle in Pygmalion at the Phillip Street Theatre in Sydney. She has appeared in numerous other theatre productions, including The Greening of Grace, The Memory of Water, Travesties, Broken Glass, Machinal and the Pulitzer Prize winning production, Clybourne Park. She has also performed in several Shakespeare works, including Henry IV, The Tempest, Love’s Labour’s Lost and an all-female version of The Taming of the Shrew.

From mid-2005 to 2008, Strehlow played the role of paramedic Lorraine Tanner in the Seven Network medical drama All Saints. Her other television credits include E Street, Blue Heelers, McLeod's Daughters, Home and Away and The Saddle Club.

Strehlow was nominated for a Sydney Theatre Award and a Glugs Theatrical Award for her role as Jackie in a 2012 stage production of I Want to Sleep with Tom Stoppard. In 2019, Strehlow and her fellow cast members were nominated for an Equity Ensemble Award for their performance in the boxing drama miniseries On the Ropes.

In 2023, Strehlow appeared at an event for A Country Practice, where fans had gathered at locations, including the Wandin Valley hospital.

In 2023, Strehlow appeared as Christine in a Q Theatre production of The Village, Puck in A Midsummer Night's Dream, and Queen Margaret in Richard III.

For many years, Strehlow has been a spokesperson on the rights of artists and the need for arts to be on the Australian national policy agenda.

She has worked as front of house manager at Seymour Centre / Carriageworks in Sydney since 2010.

== Personal life ==
Strehlow is married to a television sound technician and is the mother of soap actress Sophie Hensser. They have appeared on screen together in The Saddle Club and The Snip. Strehlow is a grandmother through Sophie, who has two children of her own.

== Filmography ==
=== Film ===
Year	Title	Role	Type
1981	Hoodwink	Martin's Sister	Feature film
1999	Dead End	Det. Maggie Layton	Feature film
2001	Dalkeith	Miss Denham	Feature film
2005	The Libertine	Woman	Film short
2009	Dear Diary	Rhonda	Film short
2009	The Storymaker	Grinning Gaol-Keeper	Film short
2009	Clown Porn	Bubbles	Film short
2015	Swingers	Carol	Film short
2017	Falling	Older Rebecca	Film short
2018	Toe-Sucker	Terri	Film short
2019	The Snip	Mathilda Farrugia	Film short
2019	Mystic Pines	Carol	Film short
2020	The Complex	Mum	Film short
2020	Diving In	Wendy	Film short
2023	Wonder Down Under	Barb Barrett / Wonder Down Under	

=== Television ===
Year	Title	Role	Type
1981	Film Continuity	Herself	Film documentary short
1981	A Step in the Right Direction	Robyn	TV film
1981–1986	A Country Practice	Sister Judy Loveday	217 episodes
1982	For the Term of His Natural Life	Jenny	Miniseries, 3 episodes
1988	The Dirtwater Dynasty	St Lukes Sister (as Wendy Stehlow)	Miniseries, 1 episode
1990	How Wonderful!	Perfect Mum / Francine Raymond / Politician's Mistress	TV film
1990	Family and Friends	Janet Simmonds	
1990	TV Celebrity Dance Party	Singer with The Madrigirls	TV special
1991	Act of Necessity	Cressa Buchanan	TV film
1991	E Street	Ruth Sloman	1 episode
1992	G.P.	Alice Meyer	Season 4, 1 episode
1993	Bay City	Sue Walker	Miniseries, regular role
1993–1994	Ship to Shore	Denise Garney	Season 2, 3 episodes
1996	The Adventures of the Bush Patrol	Maggie Dean	1 episode
1996	Natural Justice: Heat	Council Clerk	TV film
1997; 2000	Blue Heelers	Anita Harvey / Maxine Ambrose	Season 4 & 7, 2 episodes
1999	Halifax f.p.	Carol Witherspoon	Episode 14: "A Murder of Crows"
2001	The Saddle Club	Chelsea Owens	2 episodes
2001	Crash Zone	Mrs. Sparks	1 episode
2002	McLeod's Daughters	Helen	1 episode
2002	Don't Blame the Koalas	Mrs. Krantz	9 episodes
2002; 2005–2008	All Saints	Jennifer Neal	1 episode
2002; 2007	Home and Away	Jane Wallis	1 episode
2005–2008	All Saints	Lorraine Tanner	28 episodes
2013	Skit Box		1 episode
2014	Soul Mates	Cersei	1 episode
2016	Here Come the Habibs	Border Security	1 episode
2016	Hyde & Seek	Elaine	Miniseries, 1 episode
2017	Drop Dead Weird	Aubrey	1 episode
2018	On the Ropes	Gloria	Miniseries, 4 episodes
2019	Hardball	Wanda	3 episodes
2020	Tales for Uncertain Times	Stepmother	3 episodes
2022	Remember My Name	Doctor Keats	1 episode
2025	The White Lotus	Australian tourist	Season 3, 1 episode

== Theatre ==
Year	Title	Role	Notes
1979	The Seagull		NIDA, Sydney
1979	The Caucasian Chalk Circle	Chorus	Sydney Opera House with STC
1979	The Fire Raisers		NIDA, Sydney
1979	Saved		Jane St Theatre, Sydney with NIDA
	Love's Labour's Lost		NIDA, Sydney
1980	The Women Pirates Ann Bonney and Mary Read	Ginny / Elizabeth / Mabel Cormac / Creole Woman	NIDA, Sydney, University of Newcastle, Playhouse, Canberra
1980	Strife	Madge Thomas	NIDA, Sydney
1981	For the Term of His Natural Life		STCSA
1981	Fanchen		Price Theatre, Adelaide with STCSA
1981	The Revenger's Tragedy	Court Lady	Playhouse, Adelaide with STCSA
1982	The Two Oddments or The Long and Short Of It		Nimrod, Sydney
1986	Pygmalion	Eliza Doolittle	Phillip St Theatre, Sydney
1987	Absurd Person Singular		Playhouse, Newcastle with Hunter Valley Theatre Company
1991	The Norman Conquests		Ensemble Theatre, Sydney
1991	Steaming		Her Majesty's Theatre, Adelaide, Regal Theatre, Perth, Lyric Theatre, Brisbane with Gary Penny Productions
1992	Looking Off the Southern Edge		Perth Institute of Contemporary Arts with Black Swan Theatre Co
1992	Caligula in the City		Perth Institute of Contemporary Arts with Theatre Unlimited
	The Threepenny Opera		STCSA
1994	Sixteen Words for Water		Subiaco Theatre, Perth with Black Swan Theatre Co & Theatre West
1994	Sistergirl	Nurse Kay / Miss Simmons	Regal Theatre, Perth, Russell St Theatre, Melbourne with Black Swan Theatre Co, Theatre West & MTC
2002	The Tempest	Ariel	New Theatre, Sydney
2002	Gabriel		New Theatre, Sydney
2003	Portia Coughlan		Darlinghurst Theatre, Sydney with Octopus Theatre
2003	Broken Glass	Margaret	Ensemble Theatre, Sydney
2004	The Vagina Monologues		University of Sydney
2004	The Women of Lockerbie	Olive Alison	NIDA Theatre, Sydney with Cumulus Productions
2004	The Flats	Sarah	Darlinghurst Theatre, Sydney
2005	The Drowned World		Darlinghurst Theatre, Sydney
2005–2007	The Memory of Water	Vi	Darlinghurst Theatre, Sydney, Glen St Theatre, Sydney & NSW regional tour with Critical Stages & Whoosh Productions
2007	Spirit		Stables Theatre, Sydney with Griffin Theatre Company
2007	Sold	Hilary	Old Fitzroy Hotel Theatre, Sydney with Tamarama Rock Surfers
2009	Travesties	Nadezhda Krupskaya	Sydney Opera House with STC
2009	The Taming of the Shrew	Vincentio / Tailor	Theatre Royal, Hobart, SA regional tour, Canberra Theatre, Sydney Opera House with Bell Shakespeare
2010	Bang	Rosalie	Belvoir St Theatre, Sydney
2011	Bill W. and Dr. Bob		Carriageworks, Sydney with Serenity Productions
2012	Four Deaths in the Life of Ronaldo Abok		Riverside Theatres Parramatta with True West Theatre
2012	The Greening of Grace	Jane	Theatre 19, Sydney
2012	I Want to Sleep with Tom Stoppard	Jackie	Bondi Pavilion, Sydney with Tamarama Rock Surfers
2013	Henry IV	Mistress Quickly	Playhouse, Canberra, Playhouse, Melbourne, Heath Ledger Theatre, Perth, Sydney Opera House with Bell Shakespeare
2013	Return to Earth	Wendy	Stables Theatre, Sydney with Griffin Independent
2013	Machinal	Clerk / Nurse / Woman	Wharf Theatre, Sydney with STC
2014	Clybourne Park	Bev / Kathy	Ensemble Theatre, Sydney, The Concourse, Sydney
2014	The Crucible	Mrs Putnam	Leura Park Estate, Curlewis with Sport for Jove
2014–2015	A Midsummer Night's Dream		Bella Vista Farm, Leura Park Estate, Curlewis with Sport for Jove
2015	The Importance of Being Earnest	Miss Primm	Bella Vista Farm, Leura Park Estate, Curlewis with Sport for Jove
2015–2016	Love's Labour's Lost	Nathalia	Bella Vista Farm, Leura Park Estate, Curlewis with Sport for Jove
2017	Hysteria	Yahunda	Eternity Playhouse, Sydney, Darlinghurst Theatre Company
2017	One Flew Over the Cuckoo's Nest	Cheswick	Reginald Theatre, Sydney with Sport for Jove
2017	Grace Under Pressure		Seymour Centre, Sydney
2017	Invasia		Hustle & Flow Bar, Sydney with The Leftovers Collective
2019	The Merchant of Venice	Shylock	Sport for Jove
2020	Twelfth Night	Maria	Everglades, Leura with Sport for Jove
2021	The Museum of Modern Love: Open Rehearsal and Reading		Seymour Centre, Sydney
2023	The Village	Christine	The Joan, Penrith with Q Theatre Company
2023	A Midsummer Night's Dream	Puck	Everglades, Leura
2023	Richard III	Queen Margaret	

== Awards and nominations ==
Year	Title	Award	Category	Result	Ref
1985	A Country Practice	Logie Awards	Best Supporting Actress	Won	
2012	I Want to Sleep with Tom Stoppard	Sydney Theatre Awards	Best Actress in a Supporting Role in an Independent Production	Nominated	
2012	I Want to Sleep with Tom Stoppard	Glugs Theatrical Awards		Nominated	
2019	On the Ropes	Equity Ensemble Awards	Outstanding Performance by an Ensemble in a Miniseries or Telemovie	Nominated	
