= Danny Adcock =

Australian actor

- Born: 1948; Sydney, New South Wales
- Occupation: Actor
- Years active: 1969-present
- Notable work: The Moodys

Danny Adcock is an Australian actor.

== Career ==
=== Film and television ===
Adcock has worked extensively in television. After scoring a handful of guest roles, he landed his first film role as a policeman in the Ozploitation film The Cars That Ate Paris. Further small screen guest appearances included Matlock Police, Division 4, Homicide, Skyways and Cop Shop, Rafferty's Rules, A Country Practice, The Flying Doctors, Water Rats, All Saints, Home and Away, Bullpitt! and Redfern Now.

He had regular or recurring roles in the first season of Patrol Boat (1979), Arcade (1980), The Bush Gang (1981), Prisoner (1982–1983), Sons and Daughters (1983–1984), the second season of Fire (1996), Blue Heelers (2004–2005), The Jesters (2011), A Moody Christmas (2012) and The Moodys (2014). His most recent television roles have been in The Tourist and Grey Nomads (both 2022).

Adcock's film credits include We of the Never Never (1982), Early Frost (1982), Fran (1985), Resistance (1992) and more recently Ladies in Black (2018).

On 29 October 2024, Adcock was named as part of the cast for the film Scoby.

=== Stage ===
He has also appeared in numerous theatre roles throughout his career, including Hallow Ground (Belvoir Street Theatre, 2000), The Seed (Company B, Belvoir Street, 2007–2008), Moby Dick (Seymour Centre, 2018), What's Art Got to Do With It? The Dobell Case (Warners Bay Theatre, 2022), The Marvellous Boy (Griffin Theatre Company at Stables Theatre, 2005), and Da (Crossroads, 1989).

== Filmography ==
=== Television ===
Year	Title	Role	Notes
1969	Riptide	Donald	1 episode
1971	Spyforce	Radio Operator	1 episode
1972	Over There		
1972	Boney	Tony Carr	
1974	Ryan	Harry Fisher	1 episode
1971–1975	Matlock Police	Various roles	7 episodes
1971–1975	Division 4	Various roles	6 episodes
1970–1976	Homicide	Various roles	7 episodes
1976	King’s Men		1 episode
1977	Beyond Reasonable Doubt	Leith Ratten	Miniseries, 1 episode
1977	Straight Enough		TV movie
1978	Young Ramsay	Ben Salter	1 episode
1979-1981	Skyways	Nigel Poulter	1 episode
1979	Patrol Boat	Petty Officer 'Buffer' Johnston	13 episodes
1980	Arcade	Duncan Adams / Kitty's Visitor	35 episodes
1981	The Bush Gang	Mr Marsh	5 episodes
1981	Kingswood Country	Fire Chief	1 episode
1982	Deadline	ASIO agent	TV movie
1979–1982	Cop Shop	Gary Locke / Freddie Singer / Vincie Hill / Jerry Turner / Ron Jarrett	9 episodes
1982–1983	Prisoner	Geoff Carlson	11 episodes
1982–1992	A Country Practice	Antec Strzelecki / Brian Padgett / Tommy Ambrose / Graham Randall / Detective Donnolly	10 episodes
1983	The Coral Island	Tod Salter	Miniseries, 2 episodes
1983–1984	Sons and Daughters	Joe Parker	8 episodes
1984	The Secret Discovery of Australia	Mendoca's Mate	TV movie
1984	The Keepers		1 episode
1988	Australians	Arthur Higgins / Harry Seekamp	Anthology docudrama series, episode 5: "Lottie Lyell", episode 6: "Lola Montez"
1988	True Believers	Lloyd Ross	Miniseries, 6 episodes
1988–1989	Rafferty's Rules	Mick Robbins / George Healy	2 episodes
1991	E Street	Charlie Simmons	4 episodes
1992	The Flying Doctors	Cliff Bishop	1 episode
1994	Cody: A Family Affair	Collins	TV movie (season 1, episode 1)
1995	Snowy River: The Mcgregor Saga	Jarrod Banks	1 episode
1996	Fire	Firefighter Danny 'Nugget' Hunt	13 episodes
1998	Bullpitt!	Telstra Supervisor Terry	1 episode
1998	Home and Away	Gordon Macleay	
1999	Water Rats	Rhys 'Kegs' Keegan	1 episode
1999	Halifax f.p.	Athol Callaghan	1 episode
1999	Airtight	Studds	TV movie
2001	All Saints	Alan Slater	1 episode
2001	BackBerner	Tom McLachlan	
2000; 2002	Farscape	Co-Kura Strappa / T'raltixx	5 episodes
2004	Stingers	Damien Broadbent	1 episode
2004–2005	Blue Heelers	Barry Baxter	8 episodes
2006	Home and Away	Prosecutor/Crown Dennis Gillan	
2007	One of the Lucky Ones	Judge	TV movie
2007	Constructing Australia	John Bradfield	1 episode
2010–2011	Home and Away	Bishop Pitt	Recurring role
2010	Rescue: Special Ops	Graham Starkey	1 episode
2011	Jesters	Bob	8 episodes
2011	Tough Nuts 2	George Freeman	
2012	Redfern Now	Foreman	1 episode
2012	A Moody Christmas	Kevin	Miniseries, 6 episodes
2013	Legally Brown Show	Various roles	
2014; 2016	The Moodys	Kevin Moody	Miniseries, 8 episodes
2015	Devil’s Playground	Father Drake	Miniseries, 1 episode
2017	The Warriors	Onion	Miniseries, 2 episodes
2017	The Obscure	Graeme	
2019	Les Norton	Mousey	1 episode
2022	The Tourist	Ralph	Miniseries, 5 episodes
2022	Grey Nomads	Ernie Rouche	Web series, 6 episodes

=== Film ===
Year	Title	Role	Notes
1974	The Cars That Ate Paris	Police Man	Feature film
1976	Lost in the Wild (aka Barney)	Trooper Hayes	Feature film
1978	The Sparks Obituary		Short film
1980	The Earthling	Bus Driver	Feature film
1982	We of the Never Never	Brown	Feature film
1982	On the Run	Jingles	Feature film
1982	Going Down	Supporter from the Dance	Feature film
1982	Early Frost	John Meadows	Feature film
1982	Kitty and the Bagman	Thomas	Feature film
1985	Fran	Ray	Feature film
1990	Quigley Down Under	Mitchell	Feature film
1992	Resistance	James Dean	Feature film
1997	Joey	ASIO Detective	Feature film
2004	Get Rich Quick	Inspector Higgs	Feature film
2005	A Family Legacy	Bilko	Short film
2007	The Bridge	John Bradfield	Feature film
2009	Wall Boy	Youth Worker 2	Short film
2009	Lonely	Detective Lunn	Short film
2010	Stay Awake	Dad	Short film
2015	The Kangaroo Guy	Trevor	Short film
2018	Under the Hammer	Mr Hansen	Short film
2018	Ladies in Black	Doctor	Feature film
2018	The Obscure	Graeme	Short film
TBA	Scoby	TBA	Film

== Theatre ==
Year	Title	Role	Notes
1967	Camino Real	Casanova (Act I) / The Dreamer (Act III)	UNSW with NIDA
1967	The Insect Play	Mr. Beetle / Yellow Leader	UNSW with NIDA
1967	Yerma	Victor	UNSW with NIDA
1967	Alfie	Mr Smith	Jane St Theatre with NIDA
1967	Liliom	Linzman / Magistrate	Jane St Theatre with NIDA
1970s	Macbeth		Sydney Opera House with Old Tote Theatre
1972	Here We Go Round the Prickly Pear		NSW tour with Pageant Theatre in Education
1974	The Cradle of Hercules		Sydney Opera House with Old Tote Theatre
1975	Girls' Night Out		Jools Theatre Restaurant, Sydney
1975	The Cake Man		Black Theatre Arts & Culture Centre, Sydney with National Black Theatre
1976	Equus		Seymour Centre, Sydney with Old Tote Theatre
1977	A Night on the Box		No 86 Theatre Restaurant, Sydney
1977	The Plough and the Stars	Lieutenant Langon / Sergeant Tinley	Playhouse, Perth, Sydney Opera House with Old Tote Theatre
1979	The Western Show	Mortimus	Kirribilli Pub Theatre, Sydney
1980	The 1984 Show	Rudolph	Kirribilli Pub Theatre, Sydney
1980	The Vampire Show	Bertie	Bronte Inn, Sydney, Kirribilli Pub Theatre, Sydney
1983	Translations		Sydney Opera House with Ensemble Theatre
1985	Rents		Wharf Theatre, Sydney, Playhouse, Adelaide, Universal Theatre, Melbourne with The Gordon Frost Organisation
1988	The Keepers		Belvoir Street Theatre with Aboriginal National Theatre Trust
1989	Da		Crossroads Theatre, Sydney
1990	Observe the Sons of Ulster Marching Towards the Somme		Crossroads Theatre, Sydney with O'Punksky's for Sydney Festival
1990	Faith Healer		Crossroads Theatre, Sydney
1992	Prelude to Joyce's Artist		Crossroads Theatre, Sydney with O'Punksky's
1992	Us or Them		Bondi Pavilion, Sydney
1993	The Resuscitation of 'The Little Prince who Couldn't Laugh' as Performed by 'Young Mo' at the Height of the Great Depression of 1929		Crossroads Theatre, Sydney
1993	Coriolanus		Sydney Opera House with STC
1994	Big Toys		Marian St Theatre, Sydney
1994	Goodworks		Q Theatre, Sydney
1997	Taking Sides	Major Arnold	Marian St Theatre, Sydney with Northside Theatre Company
1998	Diving for Pearls	Den	Ensemble Theatre, Sydney
2000	Faith Healer	Teddy	Ensemble Theatre, Sydney with O'Punksky's
2000	Hallow Ground		Belvoir St Theatre, Sydney
2001	Hamlet	Polonius	Pork Chop Productions
2002	Gagarin Way		Belvoir St Theatre, Sydney
2003	The Cavalcaders	The Barbershop Quartet	Ensemble Theatre, Sydney with O'Punksky's
2004	The Woman with Dog’s Eyes	Malcolm Boyce	Stables Theatre, Sydney with Griffin Theatre Company
2005	The Marvellous Boy	Malcolm Boyce	Stables Theatre, Sydney with Griffin Theatre Company
2007–2008	The Seed	Danny Maloney	Belvoir St Theatre, Sydney
2008	The Pig Iron People	Jack Howard	Sydney Opera House with STC
2009	The Removalists	Sergeant Dan Simmonds	Wharf Theatre, Sydney with STC
2011	Blood Wedding	Father	STC
2012	A Picasso	Pablo Picasso	Ensemble Theatre, Sydney
2015	Orphans	Harold	Old Fitz Theatre
2015–2020	The Dapto Chaser	Errol Sinclair	Old Fitz Theatre, Stables Theatre, Sydney, Dendy Cinemas, Newtown & online with Apocalypse Theatre Company & Griffin Independent
2017; 2022	This Much is True	Cass	Old Fitz Theatre, Sydney, Riverside Theatres Parramatta with Red Line Productions
2018	Moby Dick	Captain Ahab	Seymour Centre, Sydney
2022	What's Art Got to Do With It? The Dobell Case		Warners Bay Theatre
2024	The President	Masseur / Officer / Attendant / Butcher	Roslyn Packer Theatre, Sydney with STC & Gate Theatre Dublin
