= Breast Wishes =

- An Uplifting Musical
- Music: Bruce Brown
- Lyrics: Bruce Brown
- Book: Merridy Eastman, Jonathan Gavin, Richard Glover, Wendy Harmer, Sheridan Jobbins, James Millar, Debra Oswald

Breast Wishes is an Australian musical comedy produced by Anne Looby, Simone Parrott and Neil Gooding with music and lyrics by Bruce Brown.

== Background ==
In January 2005, Anne Looby's sister, Amanda, was diagnosed with breast cancer. Wanting to help her in a meaningful way, Anne began work on a show to raise awareness and funds for the National Breast Cancer Foundation.

== Productions ==
Following several developmental workshops in 2006 and 2007, Breast Wishes premièred as a concert performance at The Sydney Theatre on 31 October 2008 as the closing event of National Breast Cancer Awareness Month. In 2009 the musical opened at Everest Theatre Seymour Centre, Sydney, where it was part of the events for International Women's Day 2009. It then embarked on a national tour, playing in the Riverside Theatre Parramatta, the Playhouse Canberra and the Twelfth Night Theatre, Brisbane.

Breast Wishes is an official fund raising supporter of the National Breast Cancer Foundation.

== Cast ==
The cast for the premier season at the Seymour Centre in April 2009 and touring nationally in 2009:

- Helen/Irene — Valerie Bader
- David — David Harris
- Carol — Anne Looby
- Lyn — Chelsea Plumley
- Sal — Gretel Scarlett
