= Sophie Hensser =

Australian actress

Sophie Bloom
- Born: Sophie Hensser; Australia
- Education: Kambala Girls School (2001–2006); Australian Theatre for Young People; National Institute of Dramatic Art (NIDA); University of Technology Sydney (2008–2012)
- Occupation: Actress
- Years active: 2001–present
- Known for: The Saddle Club, Home and Away, Love Child
- Spouse: Danny Bloom (m. 2016)
- Children: 2
- Family: Wendy Strehlow (mother)

Sophie Bloom (née Hensser) is an Australian actress, known for her roles as Megan in The Saddle Club, Freya Duric in Home and Away, and Vivian Maguire in Love Child.

== Early life and education ==
Sophie Hensser is the daughter of Wendy Strehlow, a Jewish actress. While growing up, Hensser was on sets and tours with her parents. Strehlow agreed to Hensser having an agent on the condition that she did not take rejection after auditions personally. Hensser had credited her mother as helping her to stay "grounded" as an actress.

Hensser attended high school at Kambala Girls' School from 2001 to 2006. She went on to train at the Australian Theatre for Young People, and also participated in an open course from the National Institute of Dramatic Art (NIDA). She then studied a BA in media communications, media, arts and production from University of Technology Sydney, from 2008 to 2012.

== Career ==
From 2001 to 2002, Hensser played Megan in Australian-Canadian children's series The Saddle Club, based on the book series of the same name.

In 2009, she began appearing in a recurring guest role on Seven Network soap opera Home and Away, during the 22nd season, as Freya Duric, the girlfriend of Xavier Austin (David Jones-Roberts). She is perhaps best remembered on the show for a scene which involved her kissing Nicole Franklin (Tessa James). The following year, Hensser appeared in a recurring role as Monica in Underbelly: The Golden Mile, the third season of Underbelly.

In 2011, Hensser began playing Tamara in the stage production of Lachlan Philpott's Silent Disco. Hensser told Elissa Blake from The Sydney Morning Herald that her character was the "epitome of teenage angst". The play received critical acclaim, but was a failure at the box office. In December that year, it was announced that Hensser had begun filming a regular role in the Nine Network drama series Tricky Business, playing Lily Christie. Hensser took part in the 2012 Dungog Film Festival and read for Diving for Poland at the Cockatoo Theatre.

In 2013, Hensser joined the main cast of Nine Network drama series Love Child, as Vivian Maguire. She appeared in every season until its cancellation in December 2017, after four seasons.

In 2022, Hensser again appeared in a recurring role in Home and Away, this time as Neve Spicer in Season 35. The same year, she appeared in another season of Underbelly – Underbelly: Vanishing Act, based on the story of financial advisor Melissa Caddick's disappearance.

== Personal life ==
Hensser married her partner of eight years, Danny Bloom, in a Reform Jewish ceremony in Byron Bay in 2016, that was officiated by Jeffrey Kamins, senior rabbi at Emanuel Synagogue in Sydney. She gave birth to their first child, a son, in October 2018. She later had a second child.

== Filmography ==
=== Film ===
Year	Title	Role	Notes
2011	Driver	Lara	Short film
2014	The Little Death	(Voice)	Feature film
2015	Second Hand	Tessa	Short film
2019	The Snip	Cameron Farrugia	Short film
	Bonnie Sweet Robin		Short film
	The Playground		Short film

=== Television ===
Year	Title	Role	Notes
2001–2002	The Saddle Club	Megan	Season 1, main role
2009	Home and Away	Freya Duric	Season 22, recurring role
2009	All Saints	Isabelle	Episode: "In Trust"
2010	Underbelly: The Golden Mile	Monica	Recurring role
2010	Cops L.A.C.	Karen	Episode: "Illegal Dumping"
2011	Crownies	Nadia Tesla	Episodes: "1.13", "1.14"
2012	Tricky Business	Lily Christie	Main role
2013	Serangoon Road	Gina Kershaw	Episode: "1.8"
2014–2017	Love Child	Vivian Maguire	Main role
2015	Australia: The Story of Us	Elizabeth Perry	Episode: "Worlds Collide"
2016	The Bench		Anthology series
2019	Reef Break	Sheila Clerk	Season 1, episode 12: "Prison Break"
2021	Amazing Grace	Emily	Season 1, episode 5
2022	Home and Away	Neve Spicer	Season 35, recurring role
2022	Underbelly: Vanishing Act	Wendy	Miniseries, 2 episodes
2022–2024	Colin From Accounts	Phoebe	2 episodes, guest role
TBA	The Good Hustle	Riley	

== Theatre ==
Year	Title	Role	Notes
	The Sound of Music	Elsa	Kambala Girls School
	Problem Child	Writer	Young Dramatists Page to Stage with Ensemble Theatre, Sydney
	Cleansed	Young Girl	NIDA, Sydney
	It's a Small World	Angelica	Young Dramatists Page to Stage with Ensemble Theatre, Sydney
	Summerfolk	Sonja	Bob Presents
2009	The Distance from Here	Girl	Stables Theatre, Sydney with Griffin Theatre Company
2011	Silent Disco	Tamara	Stables Theatre, Sydney, Butter Factory Theatre, Wodonga with HotHouse Theatre, Griffin Theatre Company & ATYP
2012	Diving for Poland (reading)	Rosy	Cockatoo Theatre, Sydney
2013–2014	The Removalists	Fiona Carter	Bondi Pavilion, Sydney, Brisbane Powerhouse with Tamarama Rock Surfers
2014	Ugly Mugs	Footy girl	Stables Theatre, Sydney with Malthouse Theatre & Griffin Theatre Company
2016	A History of Falling Things		Ensemble Theatre, Sydney

== Awards and nominations ==
Year	Work	Award	Category	Result
2004–2006	Sophie Hessner	Kambala Girls School	Drama Scholarship	Won
	Sophie Hessner	Tim Winton Award for Young Writers		Won
2005	Page to Stage	Young Dramatists Playwriting Award		Won
2011	Silent Disco	Sydney Theatre Awards	Best Newcomer	Nominated
