= The Emperor of Sydney =

2006 play by Louis Nowra

The Emperor of Sydney is a play by Australian playwright Louis Nowra, the third part of the Boyce trilogy following The Woman with Dog's Eyes and The Marvellous Boy. The play is a single continuous scene set at night in the living room of Beauchamp, the Boyce family mansion, where the father is dying upstairs.

It was first performed at the SWB Stables on 16 August 2006 by the Griffin Theatre Company with the following cast:

- Voice (of Malcolm Boyce, dying patriarchal property developer): doubled by the actors playing his sons
- Keith, his eldest son: Jack Finsterer
- Todd, his middle son: Alex Dimitriades
- Luke, his youngest son: Toby Schmitz
- Diane, Todd’s wife: Anita Hegh
- Gillian, Keith’s wife: Sibylla Budd

The production:

- Director: David Berthold
- Designer Nicholas Dare
- Lighting designer: Matt Marshall
