= The Woman with Dog's Eyes =

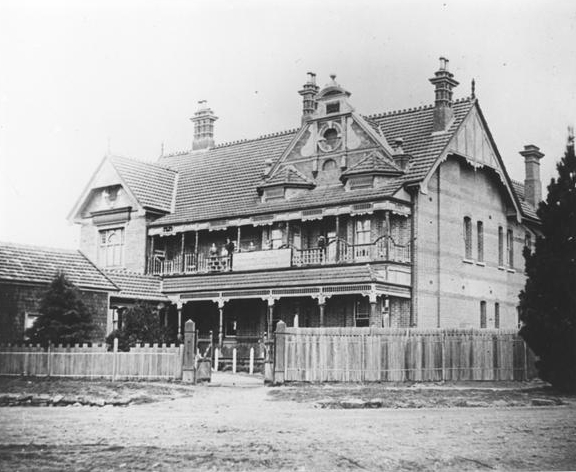
An Edwardian hotel in the Blue Mountains. "It had the feeling of another era as if the ghosts of the past and the contemporary hotel guests intermingled for a few hours." - Nowra, p. viii.

The Woman with Dog's Eyes is a play by the Australian writer Louis Nowra. It is the first part of the Boyce trilogy written for the Griffin Theatre Company at the behest of its Artistic Director David Berthold. The other two plays are The Marvellous Boy (2005) and The Emperor of Sydney (2006). The play is a single continuous scene set in a large Edwardian hotel room in the Blue Mountains.

It was first performed at the SBW Stables on 1 October 2004 with the following cast:

- Malcolm Boyce: Danny Adcock
- Penny, his wife: Jane Harders
- Keith, his eldest son: Jack Finsterer
- Todd, his middle son: Alex Dimitriades
- Luke, his youngest son: Toby Schmitz
- Alice, their neighbour: Cate Blanchett

The production:

- Director: David Berthold
- Designer: Nicholas Dare
- Lighting designer: Matt Marshall

The play concerns struggles for love, power and happiness within a family. It uses the 1949 song Some Enchanted Evening.

Nowra says the play's conception was in hotels such as the Hydro-Majestic. On a night of the Winter Solstice he met a less than happy couple who were having a fortieth wedding anniversary at the Hotel Carrington, with firecrackers and a swing band.
