= The Peach Season =

Play by Debra Oswald

The Peach Season is a play by the Australian playwright Debra Oswald. It premiered at Sydney's Griffin Theatre Company in March 2006. The play was short-listed for the New South Wales Premier's Literary Awards.

The Peach Season evokes the heat, scent and hard slog of a peach farm at harvest time. When a desperate brother and sister turn up looking for picking work, it triggers strong feelings, bad decisions and danger.

== Summary ==
Celia owns the farm. She left Sydney, with baby Zoe in her arms, sixteen years ago when her husband was killed as a bystander in an armed robbery. She has constructed a small haven, keeping her daughter safe from the dangers of the world. But Zoe is chafing against Celia's protectiveness.

This is a moving and suspenseful story about intoxicating first love and the burning love of a mother for a child. It's a story about our overwhelming desire to protect the people we love and the painful necessity to let children go out into the world.

== Details of premiere production ==
A Griffin Theatre Company production at the Stables Theatre. Previewed 10–14 March 2006 and played 15 March-22 April 2006.

- Director David Berthold
- Designer Alice Babidge
- Lighting Designer Stephen Hawker
- Sound Designer Jeremy Silver
- CELIA Anne Looby
- ZOE Maeve Dermody
- SHEENA Alice Parkinson
- KIERAN Scott Timmins
- DOROTHY Maggie Blinco
- JOE John Adam
