= James Healey (actor) =

Irish-born Australian actor (born 1951)

- Born: County Galway, Ireland
- Citizenship: Ireland; Australia
- Education: NIDA (Sydney); RADA (London)
- Known for: Dynasty; Santa Barbara

James Patrick Healey (born in County Galway, Ireland) is an Irish-born Australian actor.

== Early life and education ==
Healey's family moved to Manchester, England, before emigrating to Melbourne, Australia.

He studied a Diploma of Acting at Royal Academy of Dramatic Art (RADA) in London, graduating in 1977, and also studied acting at the National Institute of Dramatic Art (NIDA) in Sydney.

== Career ==
As a teen, in the 1970s, Healey had early guest roles in several Crawford Productions Australian police procedural series, including Homicide, Division 4, Cop Shop and Matlock Police.

Healey was George Miller's first choice for the starring role of Max Rockatansky in 1979 film Mad Max. At the time, Healey was working at a Melbourne abattoir, while pursuing film work. Upon reading the script, Healey declined the role, considering the limited and terse dialogue unappealing. Up-and-coming young Australian actor Mel Gibson instead, landed the role of Max.

Healey adapted and produced Oscar Wilde's De Profundis, and in 1978, made his London stage debut in The Golden Cradle for the Abbey Theatre. He then appeared in the television plays Memories and Even Solomon, and the series Penmarric. He played Heathcliff in a stage production of Wuthering Heights and also appeared in Privates on Parade, Bedroom Farce and Ten Times Table.

During the release of Mad Max 2 in theatres, Healey had a regular role on Australian soap opera The Restless Years in 1981, as the murderous villain Gary Fisher. He also appeared in Sons and Daughters for two episodes, as Wayne Hamilton's best man, in 1983.

As artistic director, Healey founded the Falcon Theatre Company in 1983, directing, producing and acting in plays including This Property is Condemned, Snow Angel and Zoo Story. He also appeared in 1984 films Super Sleuth and Fantasy Man (playing the role of Steve in the latter) and starred in the title role in King Lear.

While under contract at Universal Studios for two years, Healey attended UCLA Extension Writers' Program, and screenwriting workshops with John Truby and Robert McKee. He also had guest roles in several American series including Scarecrow and Mrs. King, Father Dowling Mysteries and The Young Riders.

After testing for the lead of James Bond in London, Healey starred in the soap opera Dynasty as Sean Rowan. He appeared in the show throughout the 1987–1988 season, during which time his character became the fourth husband of Alexis Carrington Colby (played by Joan Collins), after saving her life following a car crash. It was revealed that his character was secretly plotting to destroy the Carrington family, to avenge his father and sister. Healey departed from the series when his character was killed off in a fight during the 1988 season finale.

Healey starred in two-part Australian miniseries Flair in 1990, alongside Charles ‘Bud’ Tingwell, Rowena Wallace and Andrew Clarke. That same year, he was also set to appear in another Australian miniseries The Paper Man, based on the life of Rupert Murdoch, however green card restrictions required him to spend more time in America, preventing him from leaving the country at the time. Healey subsequently secured a regular role on daytime serial Santa Barbara in 1990, playing the role of Derek Griffin. He was voted one of daytime television's most popular actors.

Healey starred in the 1991 film Strangers, based on Alfred Hitchcock’s Strangers on a Train. He next appeared in several episodes of 1991 French series Tarzán, as Karl Hauser. From 1993 to 1994, he featured in American action adventure series Acapulco H.E.A.T. as the character of Strake. He played the part of a comedian in 1996 British television film, Cuts, alongside Peter Davison.

Healey's screenplay Ill-Fated was optioned several times, including by head of Paramount Studios, Robert Evens in 1995 (who had met Healey for the lead in feature thriller The Saint) with Jack Nicolson expressing interest. He returned to Australia that same year, to re-write the script, which was later purchased by Reel Movie Productions, in Melbourne.

Healey became a member of the Australian Writers' Guild in 1997. In 2005, he formed Caesars Sword Productions. In 2008, he wrote the play Gypsy Moon, which premiered at the Sheraton Grande Walkerhill in Seoul, South Korea and became a box-office hit from 2008 to 2010. Healey also wrote and directed a documentary It'll be Right on the Night, chronicling the journey of confronting Gypsy Moon.

In 2010, Healey re-wrote Will-o'-the-Wisp (re-titled Poacher), which was a semi-finalist in festivals, including Shriekfest in LA. Healey's script Precognition was optioned. He also had several scripts in development, including Dead Man's Bluff, Tarot Man, The Incarnate, and stage play Creative Differences.

== Arrest ==
In 1993, Healey was convicted of 'assault with a deadly weapon', after allegedly cutting the throat of his sister’s estranged husband with a piece of glass. He was booked for investigation of attempted murder, alongside his sister and a friend. The victim was listed in serious condition. Healey was sentenced to 200 hours of community service and three years' probation upon suspension of a two-year state prison term.

== Personal life ==
Healey relocated to Melbourne, Australia in 1996, to care for his ailing father, until his death in 2000.

== Filmography ==
=== Film ===
Year	Work	Role	Notes
1984	Fantasy Man	Steve	Feature film

=== Television ===
Year	Work	Role	Notes
1972	Matlock Police	Maxwell	Season 2, episode 74: "Cook's Endeavour"
1975; 1976	Homicide	Johnny Harris / Paddy	2 episodes
1977–1981	The Restless Years	Gary Fisher	Regular role
1979	Play for Today	Corrigan	Season 10, episode 4: "Even Solomon"
1979	Penmarric	William	2 episodes
1983	Sons and Daughters	Greg Flynn	2 episodes
1983	Five Mile Creek	Eddie Wallace	Season 1, episode 1: "Making Tracks"
1984	Super Sleuth	James Harrison	TV movie
1984	Cop Shop	Robbie Masters	2 episodes
1987	Scarecrow and Mrs. King	Nick Grant	Season 4, episode 16: "Do You Take This Spy?"
1987–1988	Dynasty	Sean Rowan	23 episodes
1990	Santa Barbara	Derek Griffin	60 episodes
1990	Flair	Chris Drake	Miniseries, 2 episodes
1990	The Young Riders	Thad Browning	Season 2, episode 2: "Ghosts"
1991	Strangers	Gary	TV movie
1991	Father Dowling Mysteries	Pete	Season 3, episode 20: "The Malibu Mystery"
1991–1994	Tarzán	Karl Hauser	Seasons 1-2, 5 episodes
1993	Between the Lines	Student	Season 2, episode 6: "Manoeuvre 11"
1993–1994	Acapulco H.E.A.T.	Niel Strake	5 episodes
1994	Heartbeat	Policeman	Season 4, episode 4: "Turn of the Tide"
1996	Cardiac Arrest	Ken, radiographer	Season 3, 6 episodes
1996	Cuts	Comedian	TV movie

== Theatre ==
Year	Work	Role	Notes
1978	The Golden Cradle		Abbey Theatre, London
	Wuthering Heights	Heathcliff	
	Privates on Parade		
	Bedroom Farce		
	Ten Times Table		
c.1983	This Property is Condemned		Falcon Theatre Company
c.1983	Snow Angel		Falcon Theatre Company
c.1983	Zoo Story		Falcon Theatre Company
