= Gretel Scarlett =

Australian actress and performer (born 1987)

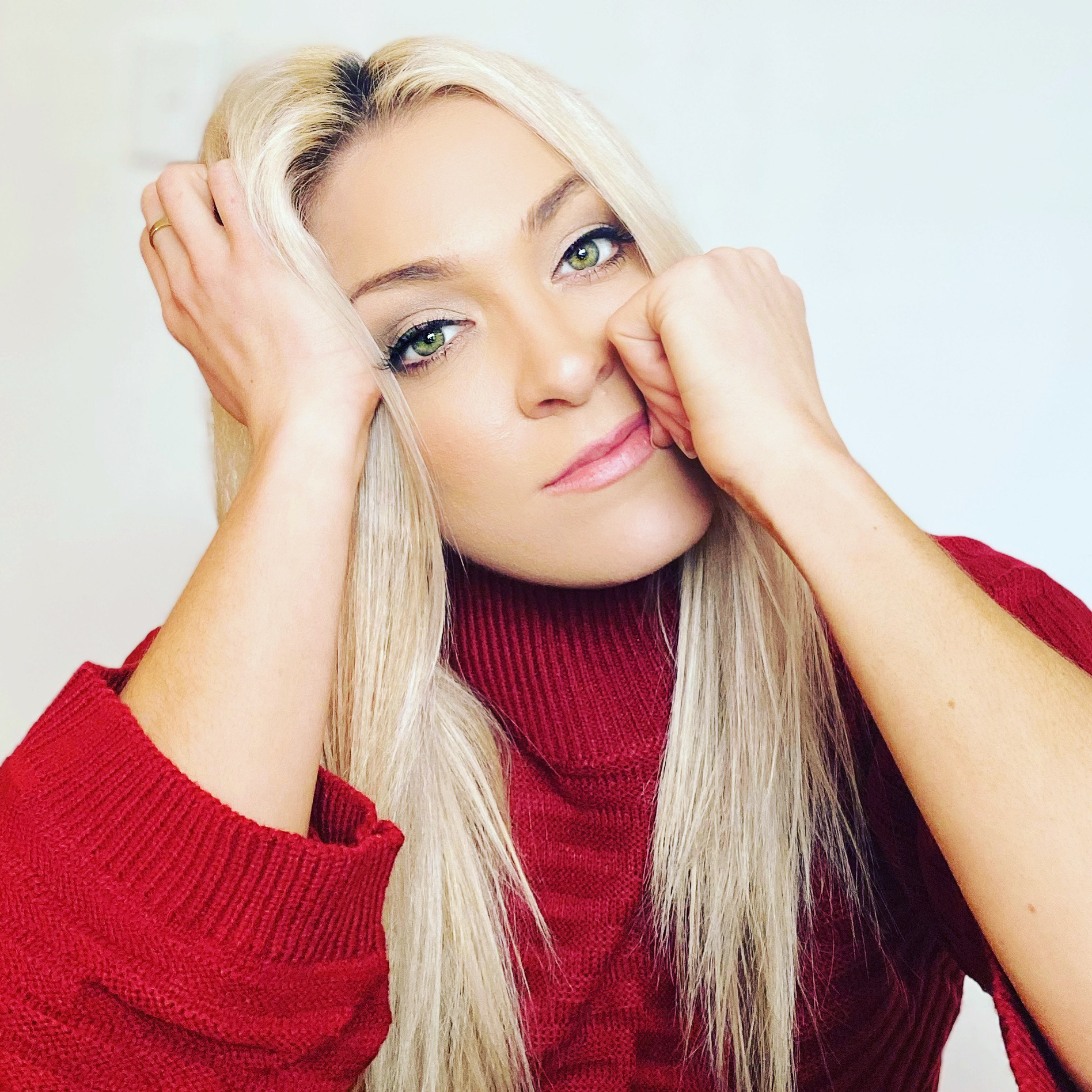
- Gretel Scarlet (2021)
- Born: November 9, 1987 (age 39); Rockhampton, Queensland, Australia
- Citizenship: Australian
- Education: Edith Cowan University (Western Australian Academy of Performing Arts) Lee Strasberg Theatre and Film Institute
- Occupations: Actress, singer, dancer
- Years active: 2004–present
- Known for: Sandy in Grease and Kathy Selden in Singin' in the Rain
- Website: www.gretelscarlett.com

Gretel Scarlett Jahnke (/ˈdʒæŋkiː/), known as Gretel Scarlett (born 9 November 1987) is an Australian actress and performer. Having appeared in theatre productions including Wicked and Mamma Mia!, she is best known for starring as Sandy in the 2013–2015 Australian production of Grease and Kathy Selden in the 2016/2017 Australian production of Singin' in the Rain which opened at Her Majesty's Theatre, Melbourne. She most recently appeared in Disney's Frozen as the Elsa understudy.

== Early life ==
Born in Rockhampton, Scarlett's parents enrolled her in singing and dancing lessons at the age of four. She later took speech and drama lessons and went on to complete her Trinity and AMEB Classical Voice and Speech/Drama Examinations as well as her RAD and Cecchetti Classical Ballet Examinations.

Growing up in central Queensland with her five brothers, Scarlett's family moved to Sydney when she was 15 to attend Newtown High School of the Performing Arts. After attending NSHPA for five weeks, she was offered a scholarship to study full-time classical ballet. She went on to complete her ballet scholarship, but after suffering stress fractures, realised she did not want to concentrate on classical ballet alone, but wanted to sing and act as well. After finishing her senior schooling, Scarlett began studying a Bachelor of Medical Radiation Science in Nuclear Medicine at the University of Sydney. However, during her first year, she chose to audition for the Western Australian Academy of Performing Arts (WAAPA). She graduated from WAAPA in 2008 with a Bachelor of Arts (Music Theatre). She received the Finley Award in 2007, and the Leslie Anderson Award for the best overall Showcase Performance and the Hal Leonard Award in 2008. Whilst at WAAPA, Scarlett appeared in several shows and played the leading role of Mrs Johnstone in its 2008 production of Blood Brothers.

== Career ==
=== Breast Wishes, Mamma Mia! and Wicked ===
Scarlett was cast in the 2009 Australian Tour of Breast Wishes, making her professional debut in the role of Sal. Scarlett was then cast in the ensemble in the 10th Anniversary Tour of Mamma Mia!, and understudied the lead roles of Sophie, Ali, and Lisa. She then joined the ensemble cast for the 2010-2012 Australian and international tours, performing the role of the witches' mother and understudying the lead roles of Elphaba and Nessarose. Scarlett felt as though she had become "a professional understudy".

=== Grease ===
In 2013, after a series of auditions, Scarlett was cast in the lead role of Sandy Dumbrowski in the Australian production of Grease opposite Rob Mills as Danny Zuko. Producer John Frost noted that Scarlett "came in and auditioned and she just knocked us away, so this is a great opportunity for her". The production opened on 25 August 2013 at the Lyric Theatre, Brisbane, to strong reviews. In December 2013, Australian producer John Frost announced that Grease would extend its Australian tour to include Singapore, Perth and Adelaide in 2014. Grease continued its Australian tour to Hobart in September 2014 and returned to Melbourne at The Regent Theatre in December 2014.

=== Happy People ===
Between seasons of Grease, Scarlett was cast as 'Sally' in the world premiere concert of Matthew Lee Robinson's Happy People at Melbourne's Chapel off Chapel on 18 and 19 October, starring alongside Bobby Fox (Jersey Boys), Tom Sharah (That '90s Show), Sun Park (Mamma Mia!), Bert LaBonté (The Mountaintop) and Robyn Arthur (The Boy From Oz), with direction by Chris Parker. The show received positive reviews, and Gretel Scarlett was received positively for demonstrating her versatility to what most Australian audiences have been unaware of. One reviewer stated "Scarlett as the manically cheerful Sally shows off some fantastic comedic chops, as well as her stunning voice of both range and power" and Sun Herald theatre critic, Simon Parris, stated she showed "a far deeper level of talent than she is able to demonstrate when performing the simple level of direction she has been given in Grease. Looking absolutely gorgeous as the Barbie-like Sally, Scarlett enhances the character’s Pollyanna outlook with a delicately vulnerable undercurrent. Her performance of "Nice" is nothing short of sensational."

=== Singin' in the Rain ===
In April 2015, Scarlett was cast in the leading role of Kathy Selden, to play opposite Adam Garcia, in the 2016/2017 Australian touring production of Singin' in the Rain. The show began rehearsals in March 2016, and opened at Her Majesty's Theatre, Melbourne in May 2016. On Sunday 13 December 2015, Scarlett co-hosted and performed at the Sydney Adventist Hospital SAH Carols by Candlelight.

Singin' In The Rain began its Australian tour, opening to mixed reviews in Melbourne on 14 May 2016. However, Scarlett received outstanding reviews with the Herald Sun stating "Scarlett is a triple-threat (singer/dancer/actor) with a bright vocal tone and thrilling vibrato perfectly suited to musical theatre" and the Sydney Morning Herald saying "everything else about the show is terrific. Opposite Garcia, Gretel Scarlett nails the Debbie Reynolds part, in an attractive and dynamic performance that glides from highlight to highlight, from busting out of a cake in a full Broadway chorus line to the chipper trio Good Mornin'." The show played a full Australian tour of Melbourne, Sydney, Brisbane, Adelaide and playing its final show in Perth on 21 January 2017.

=== Pippin and Frozen ===
In late 2020 amidst the COVID-19 pandemic, Scarlett appeared in the Australian Premier of Pippin at the Sydney Lyric Theatre in the first full-scale musical production to be staged in Australia since COVID-19 restrictions were introduced where she understudied and played the roles of Catherine and Fastrada. In December 2020, Scarlett was called upon as an emergency to perform the role of Berthe (a role which she did not understudy or rehearse) during Sydney's previews of Pippin. In February, 2021 she then joined the Australian cast of Disney's Frozen the Musical at Sydney's Capitol Theatre to understudy Jemma Rix as the lead role of Elsa.

=== Concerts and appearances ===
Scarlett has made appearances at the NSW Premier's Concert and Channel 7's Carols in the Domain. In 2011, she was selected as one six National finalists in the Third ANZ Trustees Rob Guest Endowment Award, performing live at the gala concert at Her Majesty's Theatre, Melbourne. In 2013, Kristin Chenoweth unexpectedly invited Scarlett onstage to sing a duet of "For Good" with her from the musical Wicked. Dubbed by one reviewer as "the showpiece of the entire night", the performance brought "a mid-show standing ovation from the delirious crowd."

Scarlett was an invited guest artist at 2016 National RSL Centenary Conference opening the proceedings with a rendition of the Australian National Anthem. The event was attended by the Australian Prime Minister Mr. Malcolm Turnbull, The Australian Governor General Sir Peter Cosgrove, Opposition Leader Mr. Bill Shorten & The Lord Mayor of Melbourne & other high-profile Australian political dignitaries.

Scarlett has appeared on Channel 9's Today show as well as Channel 9 Mornings. In June 2013, Scarlett was invited to sing the Australian National Anthem at Brisbane's Suncorp Stadium at game 2 of the 2013 State of Origin series. Scarlett performed at the Sydney Opera House as part of the opening act at the 2013 & 2016 Helpmann Awards and at the 2013 Australian Children's Music Foundation, performing a duet with her Grease co-star Rob Mills.

She also appeared as a special Guest Artist to sing the Australian National Anthem in 2014 and 2016 at official opening of The Royal National Agricultural and Industrial Association of Queensland (RNA) Brisbane Exhibition.

In 2014, Scarlett announced that she was in the process of recording her debut solo album, featuring covers from The Rolling Stones, Queen, and Carole King.

=== Pacific Crest Trail ===
In 2017, a few months after the closing of Singin' In The Rain, Scarlett announced on her official blog and her Instagram that for health reasons, she was taking a break, and on 12 July 2017 she was embarking on hiking the Pacific Crest Trail, 2,659 mi (4,279 km) Southbound from Canada to Mexico. She completed the hike, reaching the Mexican Border on 24 November 2017.

=== Personal life ===
In October 2021, Gretel announced via an Instagram post that she was moving to the US. She self-petitioned an EB1A Green Card in 2019 and was approved that same year.

She is a permanent resident of the United States of America and currently resides in New York City.

== Theatre credits ==
- 2009 Hello Again - Associate Choreographer
- 2009 Breast Wishes – Sal
- 2009 Mamma Mia! – Ensemble and Sophie Sheridan U/S, Ali U/S, Lisa U/S
- 2010-12 Wicked – Witches Mother, Elphaba U/S, Nessarose U/S
- 2013–15 Grease – Sandy
- 2014 Happy People in Concert by Matthew Lee Robinson – Sally
- 2016-17 Singin' in the Rain – Kathy Selden
- 2020 Pippin – Player, Fastrada U/S, Catherine U/S
- 2021 Frozen – Ensemble, Head Handmaiden, Elsa U/S

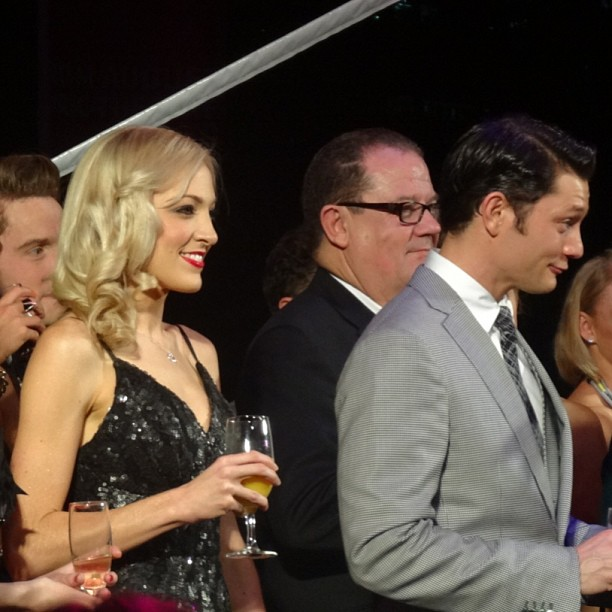
Gretel Scarlett, Rob Mills and John Frost at Brisbane's opening night of Grease at QPAC

== Recordings ==
Hopelessly Devoted – debut solo album

- "Anyone Who Had a Heart"
- "I Can't Make You Love Me"
- "Hopelessly Devoted to You"
- "Let It Go"
- "Say Something" (featuring Rob Mills)
- "No One But You (Only the Good Die Young)"
- "Ruby Tuesday"
- "Firework" (featuring Suzie Mathers)
- "So Far Away" / "It's Too Late"
- "We Found Love"

Grease – Australian cast album recording 2013 (as Sandy)

- Opening
- "Grease is the Word" (Ensemble Vocals)
- "Summer Nights"
- "Freddy My Love" (Ensemble Vocals)
- "We Go Together"
- "It's Raining on Prom Night"
- "Hopelessly Devoted to You"
- "Look at Me, I'm Sandra Dee" (Reprise)
- "You're the One That I Want"

Breast Wishes – 2012 original Australian cast recording (as Sal)

- "Let's Not Talk"
- "The Breasts Money Can Buy"
- "Mills and Boon and Me"
- "Boobies in the Eye of the Beholder"
- "Ain't Got Nothin'"
- "Get Checked"
- "There's A Moment"
- "Breast Wishes"
- "It's All About Them" (reprise)
- "Let's Not Talk" (finale)
