= A Step in the Right Direction (film) =

1981 Australian TV movie

- Written by: Janis Baldois
- Directed by: Di Drew
- Starring: Noel Hodda; Wendy Strehlow; Henri Szeps; Pat Bishop
- Country of origin: Australia
- Original language: English

Production
- Producer: John Croyston
- Production company: ABC

Original release
- Release: 1981

A Step in the Right Direction is a 1981 Australian TV movie about a love story between the son of a factory owner and the factory employee.

== Cast ==
- Noel Hodda as Gary
- Wendy Strehlow as Robyn
- Henri Szeps
- Pat Bishop
- Ben Gabriel
- Les Foxcroft
