= Nick Marchand =

British-Australian theatre director

Nick Marchand is a British-Australian theatre and arts specialist. From 2006 to 2010, he was Artistic Director and Chief Executive Officer of Griffin Theatre Company. He was previously co-curator of Wharf 2 Blueprints at Sydney Theatre Company (2001-05).

In 2010, he was announced as Country Director of the British Council in Australia. In 2014 he became the British Council’s Director Arts for China and North-East Asia and in 2019 he took up the position of Head of International Programmes at the Victoria and Albert Museum (often abbreviated as the V&A) in London.
