= Silent Disco (play) =

Play by Lachlan Philpott

Silent Disco is a play by Australian playwright Lachlan Philpott. It concerns two teenagers - one of whom is Aboriginal - at a Sydney public school.

The play premiered at the Stables Theatre in Sydney from April-June 2011, directed by Lee Lewis, for Griffin Theatre Company, Australian Theatre for Young People and HotHouse Theatre. The cast included Sophie Hensser, Meyne Wyatt, Camilla Ah Kin and Kirk Page. The production later toured to Wodonga and Arts Centre Melbourne's Fairfax Studio.

Silent Disco received the Griffin Award for an unproduced Australian play in 2009. It was nominated for Best New Australian Work at the 2011 Helpmann Awards, and received the AWGIE Award for Stage in 2012.
