= Strangers (1991 film) =

1991 Australian film

- Directed by: Craig Lahiff
- Written by: John Emery
- Produced by: Craig Lahiff; Wayne Groom
- Starring: James Healey; Anne Looby
- Production companies: Genesis Films; Australian Film Finance Corporation
- Distributed by: Video Box Office (video)
- Release date: 1991
- Running time: 83 minutes
- Country: Australia
- Language: English
- Budget: A$1.2 million

Strangers is a 1991 Australian film directed by Craig Lahiff and starring James Healey and Anne Looby.

== Plot ==
Stockbroker Gary has an affair with the dangerous Anna.

== Cast ==
- James Healey as Gary
- Anne Looby as Anna
- Geoff Morrell as Frank
- Melissa Docker as Rebecca
- John Clayton as Agent
- Tim Robertson as Father

== Production ==
It was shot from 16 October to 24 November 1989.

Craig Lahiff says it was inspired by Strangers on a Train and claims it was the first movie financed by the Film Finance Corporation to make its budget back in sales.
