= Flair (miniseries) =

1990 Australian miniseries

- Written by: Alan Hopgood
- Screenplay by: Alan Hopgood
- Directed by: Henri Safran
- Starring: Heather Thomas; Andrew Clarke; Rowena Wallace; David Reyne
- Country of origin: Australia
- Original language: English
- No. of episodes: 2 x 2 hours

Production
- Producer: Paul K. Davies
- Production company: Film Victoria Flair TV Productions The Australian Film Finance Corporation

Original release
- Network: Seven Network
- Release: 1 August – 2 August 1990

Flair is a 1990 Australian miniseries about an ambitious designer who wants to break into the fashion industry.

The plot concerns a driven career woman returning to Australia from New York to make her mark in the world of fashion design. Tessa (Heather Thomas) returns home to Melbourne to establish her own label while battling her devious younger sister, the mob, and a slew of other enemies including an alcoholic competitor, a stalker, drug dealers, jealous wives, corrupt police, and militant unions. Tessa also juggles love affairs with a married Australian businessman who may be a gangster, an American photographer, and a hot-tempered Irish thug, in between surviving various attempts on her life and investigating the “accidental” death of her father.

The program was described as cross between Dynasty and Lifestyles of the Rich and Famous, with Australian media academic Albert Moran calling it: “an entertaining melodrama with its characters moving in a fantasy world of glamour, greed, wealth and sex.”

== Cast ==
=== Starring ===
- Heather Thomas as Tessa Clarke
- Andrew Clarke as Phillip Harmon

=== Also starring ===
- James Healey as Chris Drake
- Imogen Annesley as Sally Clarke
- Rowena Wallace as Pamela Winter-Smith
- Charles Tingwell as Bert Clarke
- Elaine Smith as Megan
- David Reyne as Mark Tupper
- Joseph Bottoms as Matt Lee
- James Healey as Chris Drake
- Briony Behets as Samantha Harmon
- Terence Donovan as Sgt. Doogan
- Khym Lam as Mira

== Episodes ==
No. overall	No. in season	Title	Directed by	Written by	Original release date
1	1	"Part 1"	Henri Safran	Alan Hopgood	1 August 1990
Beautiful and talented Tessa Clarke (Thomas) returns to Australia from the U.S. intent on establishing her own fashion design business, and to reunite with her father Bert (Tingwell) and younger sister Sally (Annesley), a drug addict and call-girl with a taste for dangerous men and an intense jealousy of her older sister. Tessa’s fledgling empire is crushed when a former employer, Pamela Winter-Smith (Wallace), wins a court claim on her designs. Tessa flees to the Gold Coast where she falls for Chris (Healey), a handsome nightclub owner with underworld connections and a sordid past. Leaving Chris behind, Tessa’s business is saved by the investment of secretive millionaire Phillip Harmon (Clarke). Just as everything is looking up, Chris comes back to haunt Tessa and Bert is tragically killed in a mysterious explosion.
1	2	"Part 2"	Henri Safran	Alan Hopgood	2 August 1990
Tessa reels from her father’s death, while Phillip Harman is intent on showing her his love and showers her with lavish gifts. Mindful of warnings issued by her increasingly disturbed ex-boyfriend Chris, and her American photographer friend Matt (Joseph Bottoms), Tessa is seduced by Harmon’s charms and begins an affair with him. His glamorous socialite wife, Samantha (Behets), advises Tessa not to probe too closely into Phillip’s business affairs, hinting that he too may have underworld connections. Meanwhile, Tessa’s wayward sister Sally goes missing and Tessa’s worst fears are confirmed when she finds her. As Tessa's relationship with Harmon cracks under the pressure and she grows closer to her friend Matt, Tessa must fight several attempts on her life, union black bans against her business, and continue the search for her father’s killer.

== Production ==
Flair was filmed on location in Melbourne and the Gold Coast with a budget of $4.5 million.

Like the earlier Australian melodramatic miniseries Return to Eden, Flair was an Australian response to glamorous American television melodramas of the era such as Scruples, Bare Essence, Sins, and Dynasty. Flair is notably more humorous and provocative than those American programs, as it included “nudity, many sex scenes, and sub-plots involving prostitution, lesbianism, drug abuse, and open marriages.”

Thomas had two stunt doubles and a body double for nude scenes, telling the Sydney Sun Herald newspaper that: “I don’t believe in nudity, so I always have to have a body double. In Flair, none of that’s me. I’m a little taller and slimmer than that girl.”

The casting of Americans Thomas and Bottoms, and Irish-Australian actor Healey (who had just completed a season-long role as Alexis's husband Sean Rowan in Dynasty) was indicative of a trend in Australian miniseries from the late 1980s and early 1990s to cast well-known foreign actors in leading roles to increase the potential appeal to international audiences.

== Broadcast and reception ==
Critical reviews of Flair were generally negative, but some critics appreciated it as a “pure escapist miniseries.” The program obtained good audience ratings when it aired on the Seven Network in August 1990.

The program was broadcast in Brazil with the title Flair: Estilo Perigoso (Dangerous Style). It was broadcast in Finland with the title Kateus Ja Kosto (Jealousy and Revenge).

== Home media ==
Flair has yet to be released for home media in any form.
