= Riverina Theatre Company =

Coordinates: 35°6′29.90″S 147°22′27.04″E

- Riverina Trucking Company
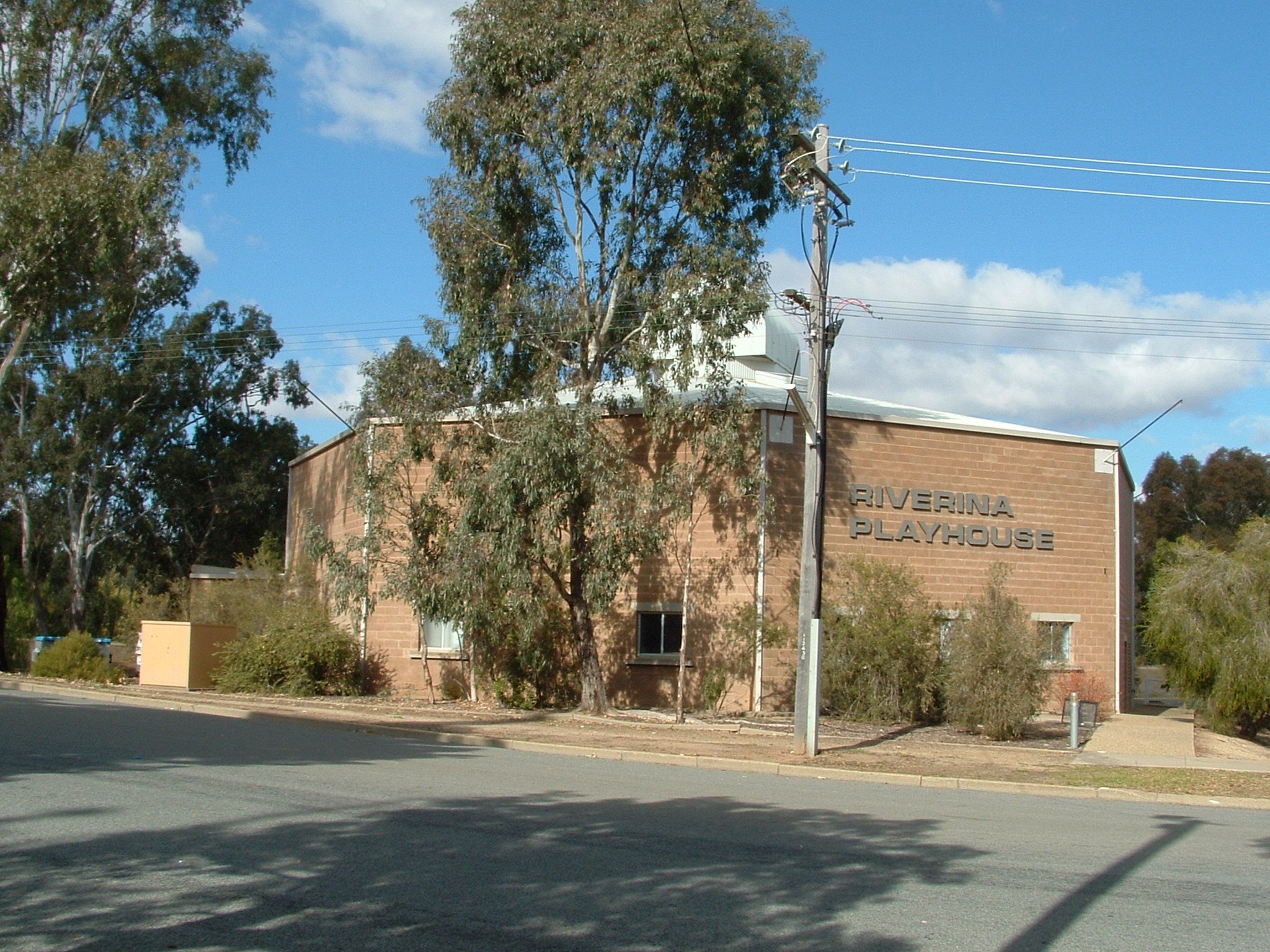
- Riverina Theatre Company was located in the Riverina Playhouse
- Interactive map of Riverina Theatre Company
- Address: Cross Street; Wagga Wagga, New South Wales; Australia
- Owner: Charles Sturt University

Construction
- Opened: 1976
- Closed: 2009

Website
- www.riverinatheatrecompany.com.au

Riverina Theatre Company (also known as the RTC) was a non-profit organization located in Wagga Wagga, New South Wales, Australia. It was established in 1976 as the Riverina Trucking Company however changed its name to the Riverina Theatre Company in 1983. It was the longest serving theatre company in Regional Australia.

In 2005, Riverina Theatre Company lost $150,000 in funding from The Australia Council after the council's director of theatre found that the application for funding wasn't strong enough.

Charles Sturt University took over ownership of the after the theatre company which was $90,000 in debt and also lost $300,000 in State and Federal Government funding for its operation.

== Closure ==
On 17 March 2009, the board members of the Riverina Theatre Company decided to place the RTC into liquidation after the RTC lost government grants of up to A$300,000 and the failure of last two productions to being in income.
