= Actors Centre Australia =

Australian private dramatic arts school

- Established: 1987; 39 years ago
- Location: Glebe, New South Wales, Australia; 33.8871622°S 151.1577°E
- Campus: Urban
- Website: actorscentreaustralia.com.au

Actors Centre Australia is a private, dramatic arts and acting school offering both certificate and degree level qualifications, based in Glebe.

== History ==
ACA was founded in 1987 by Dean Carey, then aged 27. He has remained associated with ACA since, while also having a varied national and international teaching, production, and performing career.

== Patron ==
Hugh Jackman is Patron of ACA. He graduated from ACA's full-time acting course in 1991. Having established a national and international career, Jackman accepted the role of Patron in 2007 and continues to support the ACA.

== Organisation ==
ACA is a trading name of the Australian registered company, ACA Sydney Pty Ltd ABN 13 601 586 467 which is also a registered training organisation (RTO) (Code:45065).

Staff are organised as Executive Teaching, Teaching, and Operational staff.

== Courses ==
- Bachelor of Performing Arts (Stage and Screen) – 3 years (in association with Torrens University Australia)
- Masterclasses (Online via Zoom)
- Foundation Program - 5 months

Also offered, previously:

- Advanced Diploma in Performing Arts, Acting – 2.5 years
- 10 Week Programs – Stage, Screen, Casting.

== Festivals ==
The ACA organises or participates in several festivals, including:

- Sydney Science Fiction Film Festival
- Norton Street Italian Festa (postponed in 2020 due to COVID-19)

== Alumni ==
- Hugh Jackman, 1991
