= The Marvellous Boy =

Play by Louis Nowra

- Original language: English
- Written by: Louis Nowra
- Genre: Melodrama

Premiere
- Date: 13 October 2005
- Place: Griffin Theatre, Sydney

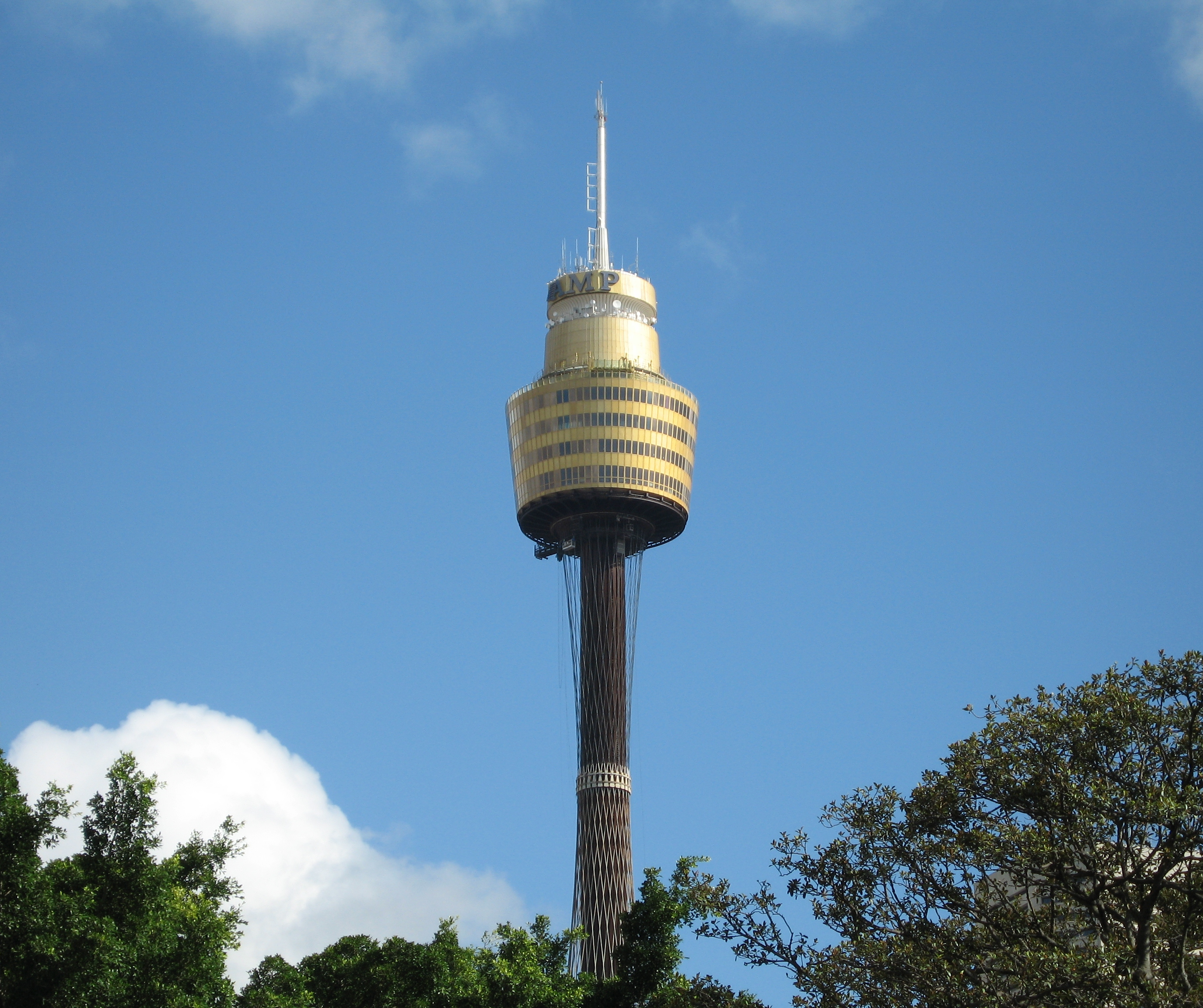
The top of the Sydney Tower, where the play's first scene is set

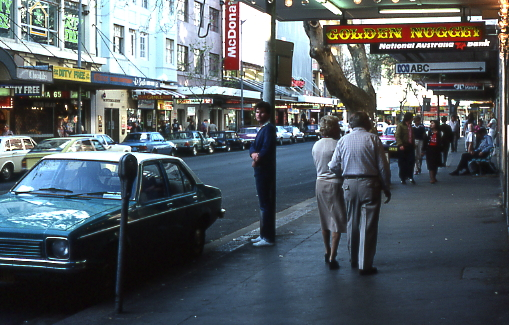
The main street of Kings Cross, where most of the play is set

The Marvellous Boy is a play by Australian playwright Louis Nowra, the second part of the Boyce trilogy. It is set in Sydney, particularly in Kings Cross.

It was first performed at the SWB Stables on 13 October 2005 by the Griffin Theatre Company with the following cast:

- Luke: Toby Schmitz
- Malcolm Boyce, his father: Danny Adcock
- Ray: Anthony Phelan
- Victor/Bain Cipolla: Bruce Spence
- Esther: Susie Lindeman

The production:

- Director: David Berthold
- Designer: Nicholas Dare
- Lighting designer: Matt Marshall

== Sources ==
Some of the characters have similarities to well-known people in Sydney, such as the Moran family. Esther's plight resembles that of Juanita Nielsen in the 1970s. Ray has suggestions of businessman Abe Saffron and his partner Jim Anderson, who did die of bird flu. In his Introduction to the text, director David Berthold also compares Malcolm to property developer Frank Theeman (p. x). But such similarities are so numerous and diverse that the play is clearly no roman à clef.

== Critical reception ==
Stephen Dunne, writing for The Sydney Morning Herald had reservations about the play: "Perhaps it's a middle section of the trilogy problem, but this play feels very thin. There are some cliched ideas, the characters don't really go anywhere, and the conclusion (after the needless and momentum-sapping interval) will surprise few."

== Notes ==
- Nowra, Louis, The Boyce trilogy, Sydney: Currency Press, 2007. ISBN 978-0-86819-798-2
