= Debra Oswald =

Australian writer

- Born: 1959 (age 66–67)
- Occupations: Writer of novels, plays and TV drama
- Writing career
- Language: English
- Years active: 1983-
- Notable works: Offspring (TV series), Stories in the Dark (play) and The Family Doctor (novel)
- Notable awards: NSW Premier's Literary Award in 2008 and 2011. 2014 AACTA for best TV screenplay.

Debra Oswald (born 1959) is an Australian writer for film, television, stage, radio, fiction and children's fiction.

In 2008 her Stories in the Dark won Best Play in the NSW Premier's Literary Awards. She created and was head writer of the Channel 10 drama series Offspring, now on Netflix, for which she won the 2011 NSW Premier's Literary Award and the 2014 AACTA Award for best TV screenplay. Her novel Useful was released in 2015, followed by her novel The Whole Bright Year in 2018, both published by Penguin Random House. Her novel The Family Doctor was published by Allen and Unwin in March 2021. Oswald performed her one-woman stage show, Is There Something Wrong With That Lady, at Sydney's Griffin Theatre in April 2021, with a return season at Sydney's Ensemble Theatre in 2023. Her novel One Hundred Years of Betty was published by Allen and Unwin in March 2025 and was longlisted for that year's Adult category of the ARA Historical Novel Prize.

== Career ==
Oswald began writing as a teenager. Her first play was workshopped at the 1977 Australian National Playwrights Conference when she was 17, and then broadcast on ABC Radio. She studied at the Australian National University and at the Australian Film Television and Radio School and has since made her living as a writer for film, television, stage and radio as well as publishing a number of novels for children. She lives in Sydney with the author and radio personality Richard Glover; they have two sons.

Her play, Dags, has had many productions around Australia and has been published and performed in Britain and the United States. Debra's other plays include Going Under, produced by Adelaide's Troupe Theatre in 1983, and Lumps, which premiered at the Q Theatre in 1993. In 1996, a co-production of Debra's play Gary's House by Playbox and the Q Theatre played in Melbourne, Penrith and the Gold Coast. There have also been productions in Adelaide, Hobart, Newcastle, Canberra and Hjoerring, Denmark. Gary's House was on the New South Wales Year 12 drama syllabus. In 2000, her play Sweet Road was presented in Melbourne and Adelaide in a Playbox/STC of SA co production, and in Sydney by the Ensemble Theatre. Sweet Road, Gary's House and The Peach Season were all short-listed for the New South Wales Premier's Literary Awards.

Mr Bailey's Minder and The Peach Season both premiered at Griffin Theatre Company. Mr Bailey's Minder toured nationally in 2006 and premiered in the United States in 2008 at the Walnut Street Theatre in Philadelphia. Gary's House was staged in Japanese in Tokyo by Rakutendan Theatre in 2008.

Her writing for television includes the mini series Palace of Dreams (1985) as well as Dancing Daze (1986), Police Rescue (1991), Bananas in Pyjamas (1992), Wildside (1997), Swinging (1997), Magic Mountain (1997), The Secret Life of Us (2001), and Outriders (2001). Her Police Rescue scripts have been nominated for AFI, AWGIE and State Library awards. Her series Offspring, produced by Southern Star/John Edwards and Network Ten, was broadcast from 2010. Seven series of Offspring were broadcast up to 2017, with Oswald involved in the first five series.

Debra is also the author of the children's novels Me and Barry Terrific (1987) and The Return of the Baked Bean (1990) and The Fifth Quest (2002). She has also written three Aussie Bites – Nathan and the Ice Rockets (1998), Frank and the Emergency Joke (2000), and "Frank and the Secret Club". Her other novels for young people are The Redback Leftovers (Penguin 2000, republished 2007), Getting Air (2007, Random House), and Blue Noise (2009), a book about teenagers who establish a blues band.

She has written four plays for teenage audiences, the most recent of which is House on Fire, performed by the Australian Theatre for Young People in June 2010. She has written two previous plays for the Australian Theatre for Young People – Skate, which toured to the Belfast Festival, and Stories in the Dark .

Of Stories in the Dark, her winner in the NSW Literary Awards, the judges said: "By engaging us with dark tales, paradoxically told as a distraction in a time of war, Oswald probes the role of imagination in survival, with insight and a sureness of craft.... Debra Oswald's clear-eyed, compassionate play shows us the role of story in making sense, and thus its place in the persistence of hope."

In 2021 Oswald debuted on stage, performing her one-woman show Is There Something Wrong With That Lady? at the Griffin Theatre.

== Awards ==
- AACTA Awards, Best TV Screenplay, 2014: winner for Offspring, series 4, episode 13
- New South Wales Premier's Literary Awards, Script Award, 2011: winner for Offspring
- New South Wales Premier's Literary Awards, Play Award, 2008: winner for Stories in the Dark
- Queensland Premier's Literary Awards, Drama Script (Stage) Award, 2005: shortlisted for Mr Bailey's Minder
- Griffin Award for New Australian Playwriting, 2004: winner for Mr Bailey's Minder
- Seaborn Playwright's Prize for The Peach Season (2005)

== Bibliography ==
=== Plays ===
- Dags (Currency Press, 1987
- The Two-way Mirror [manuscript]
- Our Hopeful Youth: a radio play with music in three scenes [manuscript]
- Lumps (1993)
- Gary's House (Currency Press in association with Playbox Theatre, 1996)
- Sweet Road (Currency Press in association with Playbox Theatre, 2000)
- Skate (Currency Press, 2004)
- Mr Bailey's Minder (Currency Press, 2005)
- The Peach Season (Currency Press, 2007)
- Stories in the Dark (Currency Press, 2008)
- House on Fire (2010)

=== Novels ===
- Useful (Penguin Books, 2015) ISBN 9780143573739
- The Whole Bright Year (Viking, 2018), ISBN 9780143788256
- The Family Doctor (Allen & Unwin, 2021), ISBN 9781760877781
- One Hundred Years of Betty (Allen and Unwin, 2025) ISBN 9781761470615

=== Children's books ===
- Me and Barry Terrific (Oxford University Press, 1987)
- The return of the Baked Bean (Puffin, 1991)
- Nathan and the ice rockets (Puffin Books, 1998) with Matthew Martin
- The Redback Leftovers (Puffin, 2000)
- Frank and the emergency joke (Puffin, 2000) with Stephen Axelsen
- Frank and the secret club (Puffin Books, 2005) with Matthew Martin
- The fifth quest (Puffin, 2002)
- Getting air (Random House Australia, 2007)
- Blue Noise (Random House Australia, 2009)

=== Television series ===
- Bananas in Pyjamas (1992)
- Swinging (1997)
- Offspring (2010–2013)
