= The Secret House =

1917 novel by Edgar Wallace

- Author: Edgar Wallace
- Language: English
- Genre: Thriller
- Publisher: Ward Lock
- Publication date: 1917
- Publication place: United Kingdom
- Media type: Print

The Secret House is a 1917 thriller novel by the British writer Edgar Wallace. It featured the return of several characters who had appeared in his earlier work The Nine Bears.
