= Lachlan Philpott =

Australian playwright

Lachlan Philpott (born 20 March 1972) is an Australian theatre writer, director, and teacher. He graduated from the University of New South Wales (BA Hons Theatre and Film), the Victorian College of the Arts (Post-Grad Dip, Directing Theatre), and NIDA Playwrights Studio. He was Artistic Director of Tantrum Theatre in Newcastle, writer-in-residence at Red Stitch in Melbourne, and the Literary Associate at ATYP. His 18 plays have been performed across Australia as well as Ireland, the United Kingdom, and the United States. He was Chair of the Australian Writers' Guild Playwrights’ Committee between 2012 and 2016, and was the recipient of the Fulbright Scholarship Inaugural Professional Playwriting Scholarship in 2014.... In 2012 his play Silent Disco won the Stage Award at the 45th annual AWGIE Awards.

Australian arts journalists have described Philpott's writing style as "fluid and musical", filled with "poetic stylistic devices which he employs" that demand "verbal dynamics and intricate adjustments [from] actors and demand a focus of concentration and a technique of great security and flexibility". The Australian Arts review described him as "one of the country’s hottest writers, rocketing into the Sydney theatre landscape in his distinctive language". The Australian newspaper has compared some of Philpott's work to that of Nobel Prize-winning author Patrick White.

== Playwrighting and advocacy work ==
His most recent work, The Trouble With Harry, about the criminal trial of an Australian trans man in the 1920s, opened at the 2014 Melbourne Festival. Writing for The Australian newspaper, journalist Chris Boyd compared Philpott's writing to that of Patrick White, and praised Philpott's "poetic ear and alien eye":

Philpott’s play about Harry Crawford, who was convicted of the murder of his wife Annie in the early 1920s, is a poetic fugue for voices. The language is heightened without being self-conscious or arch. Philpott’s easy use of a louse-ridden bantam hen (which turns out to be a rooster) as a device is as effective as the bitch-on-heat motif in White’s The Season at Sarsaparilla.

His account of working-class life circa 1917 has a cool and non-judgemental curiosity. It’s not detached exactly — there’s a lenient fascination that looks a little like envy — but it’s anthropological somehow.

An advocate for the Australian writing professionals, coverage and debate over Philpott's call for greater emphasis on Australian-written content on Australian theatre stages has appeared in the Sydney Morning Herald and his suggestion on a five-year-ban on any further productions of Shakespeare to allow for more productions of Australian works was discussed by panelists including Germaine Greer and John Bell on ABC TV's Q & A program

Australian theatre professionals discussed in the mainstream media Philpott's call for a ban, such as director Damian Ryan who told the ABC that though he agreed that some of the Shakespeare's works were done too often in Australia, "audiences want to watch it" and that "actors dream of playing these roles and love to set themselves up against this extraordinary test". Elsewhere, writer and director Ross Mueller praised Philpott's contributions to original Australian stage writing and Philpott's call for the ban, presenting the opposite view to Greer in saying that:

Philpott is right to suggest that it doesn’t take too many brain cells to program something that is low cost and high yield. Shakespeare is programmed by professional companies because Shakespeare is in English and he is out of copyright. This means the works are free. No royalties for the author and no development costs. In addition to the lack of research and development, there is also a guaranteed box office.

Philpott offers the position that Australians should investigate Australian stories instead of bathing blind in The Bard. [Because] our own voice, our own accent, our own narrative is being lost in the shadow of a white English male. [Philpott's] works often deal with young people, isolated people. His plays often document the joys and the difficulties of living in our country in this century. His plays have been produced in Australia and the United States. He is a Fulbright Scholar, a teacher and he grapples with complex ideas. His drama is filled with great comic characters. Philpott writes good jokes in his tragedies and this is why people like his plays.

A good night out at the theatre should be like going to the football. We should recognise ourselves on the big stage, we should be hearing our accents and wanting to participate in our stories. This interaction grows a culture. It develops a national library of experience and it helps us to define who we are. A five-year ban on Shakespeare is a great idea for the development of Australian culture. Not for what it is removes, but for what it provokes. And provocation has always been the central task of the dramatist

In 2013, Philpott and the Perth Theatre Company had a well-publicised disagreement over authorship when the Company staged Philpott's play Alienation making substantial changes to the text without the playwright's permission. Philpott removed his name from the production and placed notes of protest on theatre seats on the play's opening night but via a statement through the Australian Writer's Guild stated his retention of intellectual ownership over the original script. The Perth Theatre Company declined to respond publicly, saying only that they were aware “of statements made by certain stakeholders and partners in our production Alienation. PTC strongly disagrees and is disappointed with these statements and considers them to be inaccurate and unwarranted. PTC will continue to operate in a professional manner, and at this stage, does not intend to make any further public comments, preferring to have the relevant matters resolved through agreed resolution processes”

Nevertheless, a proposed Penrith season of the production was cancelled, with the Penrith Theatre Company releasing the following statement:

Unfortunately, Lachlan Philpott has raised concerns that he considers the production of Alienation currently showing by the Perth Theatre Company (which was to show in Penrith between 18 and 27 July 2013), does not reflect his original, scripted or communicated intentions as the playwright. As such the Penrith season of Alienation has been cancelled. [We are] committed to supporting and promoting the works of Australian playwrights such as Lachlan Philpott.

Dr Alyson Campbell, Head of Graduate Studies in Performing Arts at the VCA, chose Philpott to speak about HIV as it is represented in Australian theatre for a panel held in Melbourne in 2014, citing Philpott’s need to address the "cultural amnesia about HIV in the gay community”.

Philpott spent time in Beijing working with Chinese director Wang Chong on a work about China's "Little Emperors", the legions of now adult males raised as only children under the one-child program. The Age newspaper described the Melbourne production of the work as "a collaboration between Australian playwright Lachlan Philpott and Chinese director Wang Chong [that] dives into some of the social implications through heightened, visually striking domestic melodrama" and praised its "brilliant direction, concept and design"

== Plays ==
- Bison (2000): Premiered at Builders Arms Hotel Melbourne 2000 as part of Midwinta Festival, director Alyson Campbell.
- Due Monday (2003): Premiered at NIDA Parade Studio 2003, director Luke Mollinger.
- Catapult (2004): Premiered at The Mechanics Institute Brunswick Melbourne 2004, director Alyson Campbell.
  - Nominated best play Melbourne Fringe Awards 2005.
- Colder (2008): First produced at Griffin Theatre May 2008, director Katrina Douglas. Winner R.E. Ross Trust Award, Victorian Premier’s Literary Awards 2006
- Bustown (2009): First produced by Australian Theatre for Young People 2009, director Amy Hardingham.
- Silent Disco (2012): Premiere produced by Griffin Theatre Co and Australian Theatre for Young People at Griffin Theatre April 2012, director Lee Lewis.
  - Winner Australian Writer’s Guild Best Stage Play 2012
  - Winner Griffin Award for most outstanding new Australian Play 2009
  - Shortlisted for Best New Australian work at The Helpmann Awards 2011.
  - Shortlisted for Best New Australian Play, Sydney Theatre Critics Awards.
  - Shortlisted for NSW Premier’s Literary Awards 2012
- Alienation (2013): Produced by Perth Theatre Company 2013
- In 3-D (2013): Premiered at The Traverse Theatre Edinburgh, Scotland, 2013, director Hamish Pirie.
- The Trouble with Harry (2013): Premier produced by TheatreofplacK at The Mac Belfast, 2013, director Alyson Campbell.
  - Winner Best Production and Best Direction for Melbourne Green Room Awards.
  - Shortlisted for The Nick Enright Award for Playwriting, New South Wales Premier's Literary Awards 2015.
  - Shortlisted for Australian Writer’s Guild AWGIE Best Australian Play 2013.
- M-Rock (2014): Premiered at Sydney Theatre Company’s Wharf 2 2014. Featured at the National Play Festival Australia 2013. Published by Oberon Press 2014.
- Lake Disappointment (2016): Commissioned by Bell Shakespeare Sydney. Cowritten with Luke Mullins. Performed at Carriageworks.
- Lost Boys: Shortlisted for the NSW Premier's Literary Awards, Nick Enright Prize for Playwriting, 2019.
