= Sport For Jove Theatre Company =

Australian theatre company

Sport For Jove Theatre Company is an Australian theatre company. It was founded in 2008 by actors and directors Damien Ryan and Terry Karabelas. The company stages the works of William Shakespeare and other classical and new Australian writers.

== Outdoor festivals ==
- Shakespeare in the Rose Garden

The Shakespeare in the Rose Garden Festival was the first Outdoor Festival set up by Sport For Jove Theatre Company in 2009 and was the brainchild of Damien and Bernadette Ryan. The Festival was renamed The Sydney Hills Shakespeare in 2010.

- The Sydney Hills Shakespeare in the Park

The Sydney Hills Shakespeare in the Park is an outdoor Shakespeare Festival based in the Hills Shire District.

Following Shakespeare in the Rose Garden's A Midsummer Night's Dream in 2009, Sport For Jove Theatre Company and The Hills Shire Council presented a new annual program for 2010 at Bella Vista Farm.

The Sydney Hills Shakespeare in the Park at the Bella Vista Farm premiered in December 2010 with Sport for Jove Theatre Company performing a repertory season of two Shakespeare plays, Romeo and Juliet & As You Like It.

- The Leura Shakespeare Festival

The Leura Shakespeare Festival is an outdoor Shakespeare Festival created by Sport For Jove Theatre Company and supported by the National Trust.

The festival has performed works in two different locations Everglades, Leura and The Norman Lindsay Gallery.

- The Sydney Morning Herald Autumn Festival of Arts Shakespeare in the Garden

The outdoor festival in the Royal Botanic Gardens, Sydney had its inaugural season in 2011. Sport For Jove Theatre Company partnered with The Royal Botanic Gardens and Domain Trust and sponsored by The Sydney Morning Herald Autumn Festival of Arts performed two plays: A Midsummer Night's Dream and As You Like It in March. The Festival also included a Director's talk by director Damien Ryan.

== Seasons ==
=== 2008 ===
- A Midsummer Night's Dream directed by Damien Ryan and Terry Karabelas

=== 2009/2010 ===
Shakespeare in the Rose Garden

- A Midsummer Night's Dream directed by Damien Ryan and Terry Karabelas

The Leura Shakespeare Festival

- A Midsummer Night's Dream directed by Damien Ryan and Terry Karabelas
- Romeo and Juliet directed by Damien Ryan and starring Michael Sheasby and Eloise Winestock

=== 2010/2011 ===
The Sydney Hill's Shakespeare Festival

- Romeo and Juliet directed by Damien Ryan and starring Damien Strouthos and Eloise Winestock
- As You Like It directed by Damien Ryan and starring Lizzie Schebesta and Christopher Stalley

The Leura Shakespeare Festival

- A Midsummer Night's Dream directed by Damien Ryan and Terry Karabelas
- Romeo and Juliet directed by Damien Ryan and starring Damien Strouthos and Eloise Winestock
- As You Like It directed by Damien Ryan and starring Lizzie Schebesta and Christopher Stalley

=== 2011 ===
The Sydney Morning Herald Autumn of the Arts Shakespeare in the Park

- A Midsummer Night's Dream, directed by Damien Ryan and Terry Karabelas
- As You Like It, directed by Damien Ryan and starring Lizzie Schebesta and Christopher Stalley
- The Libertine (Thomas Shadwell, 1676), directed by Damien Ryan and Terry Karabelas

=== 2024 ===
In 2024, Sport for Jove produced a production called I Hate People; or Timon of Athens directed by Margaret Thanos, and starring the company's artistic director Damien Ryan. The production was reviewed in the Sydney Morning Herald as the "pinnacle of Shakespeare in Sydney this century". The production performed at the Everglades, Leura as the 15th anniversary of the festival.

== Education ==
Sport for Jove Theatre Company is currently developing its education program Y Shakespeare.

== Critical reception ==
- Sydney Morning Herald Review of As You Like It
- Sydney Arts Guide Review
- Sydney Morning Herald Review of Timon of Athens
