= Griffin Theatre Company =

Australian theatre company

Griffin Theatre Company is an Australian theatre specialising in new works, based in Sydney. Founded in 1979, it is the resident theatre company at the Stables Theatre in Kings Cross. As of February 2020 the artistic director is Declan Greene.

== Artistic directors ==
- Declan Greene (2020–present)
- Lee Lewis (August 2012–2020)
- Sam Strong (2010–2012)
- Nick Marchand (2006–2010)
- David Berthold (2003–2006)
- Ros Horin (1992–2003)
- Ian Watson
- Peter Kingston (inaugural artistic director)

== History ==
Founded in 1979 its original founders were Peter Carmody, Penny Cook, Eadie Kurzer, Jenny Laing-Peach, and Rosemarie Lenzo. The organisation held its first meetings in Laing-Peach's cottage in Griffin Street, Surry Hills. Their first project was to present the Irish play The Ginger Man by James Patrick Donleavy at the Kirk Gallery in Cleveland Street, Surry Hills on 6 April 1979. The first Artistic Director was Peter Kingston who served until the appointment of Ian B Watson in 1988.

For the 1984 season the company was awarded The Sydney Critic's Circle Award for "the most significant contribution to theatre that year." In 1986 The SBW Foundation Purchased the Stables Theatre and offered the company a lifetime rent-free lease.

The theatre focuses on "all-Australia" talent and works.

Cate Blanchett and Jacqueline McKenzie began their professional careers at Griffin. The films Lantana, The Boys, and The Heartbreak Kid (which later spun off into the television series Heartbreak High) were based on plays produced by Griffin. Away, Australia's most produced contemporary play, also started at the company.

== Programs ==
=== The Batch Festival ===
In 2018 Griffin launched an annual experimental theatre festival, the Batch Festival. It is a three-week festival featuring multiple shows each day, curated to highlight emerging artists. It was paused in 2021 owing to the COVID-19 pandemic.

=== Griffin Independent and Griffin Special Extras ===
Running since 2004 (then called Griffin Stablemates), in parallel to Griffin's own mainstage season of new Australian plays, Griffin Independent is an annual season of 5–6 new plays presented by independent theatre companies. In 2018, Griffin Independent was updated to Special Extras.

== Awards ==
=== Griffin Award ===
Bestowed annually since 1998, the Griffin Award is offered to the most outstanding new work as read and judged by a panel appointed by Griffin. The award comes with a $10,000 cash prize. One stipulation on entry is that all works submitted have not been performed or produced prior.

- 1998 – Catherine Zimdahl for Clark in Sarajevo
- 1999 – Neil Cole for Alive at Williamstown Pier
- 2000 – Ian Wilding for Below
- 2001 – Verity Laughton for Burning
- 2002 – Noelle Janacsewska for Songket and Patrick Van der Werf for Presence
- 2003 – Brendan Cowell for Rabbit
- 2004 – Debra Oswald for Mr Bailey's Minder
- 2005 – Ian Wilding for The Carnivores
- 2006 – Mary Rachel Brown for Australian Gothic
- 2007 – Damien Millar for Emergency Sex and Other Desperate Measures
- 2008 – Glace Chase for Whore
- 2009 – Lachlan Philpott for Silent Disco
- 2010 – Aidan Fennessy for Brutopia
- 2011 – Glace Chase for A Hoax
- 2012 – Vivienne Walshe for This is Where We Live
- 2013 – Donna Abela for Jump for Jordan
- 2014 – Angus Cerini for The Bleeding Tree
- 2015 – Stephen Carleton for The Turquoise Elephant
- 2016 – Melissa Reeves for The Zen of Table Tennis
- 2017 – David Finnigan for Kill Climate Deniers
- 2018 – Suzie Miller for On the Face of It (Prima Facie)
- 2019 – Mark Rogers for Superheroes
- 2020 - Dylan Van Den Berg for way back when
- 2021 - Megan Wilding for GAME. SET. MATCH.
- 2022 - Grace Chow for The Promise Land

=== Griffin Studio ===
Griffin Studio is a year-long residency for directors, writers and dramaturgs with the company, established in 2011. It is awarded annually to one or more applicants.

=== Lysicrates Prize ===
Founded in 2015, the Lysicrates Prize is awarded annually to a play and is described as a "philanthropic initiative presented by The Lysicrates Foundation and produced by Griffin Theatre Company". The inaugural prize was won by Steve Rodgers for his play Jesus Wants Me for a Sunbeam.

=== Incubator Fellowship ===
In 2020 the company partnered with Create NSW to form the Incubator – NSW Theatre (Emerging) Fellowship program (a.k.a. Incubator Fellowship). Shortlisted fellows complete a three-month incubator program for emerging playwrights, directors, dramaturgs, designers and composers to work with the company. One of the fellows is then chosen to receive $30,000 to "pursue a self-directed program of professional development in Australia or overseas".

Winners

- 2020: Ang Collins
- 2021: Happy Feraren
- 2022: Eve Beck

=== Suzie Miller Award ===
The Suzie Miller Award was established in 2024 for mid-career playwrights, named in honour of Australian playwright Suzie Miller. The award provides a full commission and residency at the theatre, along with mentorship by Miller. It is open to established writers whose work deals with "knotty, contemporary questions". The inaugural winner of the award was Mary Rachel Brown.

== Recent seasons ==
Recent Griffin Theatre Company mainstage seasons are listed below.

=== 2020 season ===
- Family Values by David Williamson. 17 January – 7 March 2020

=== 2019 season ===
- Dead Cat Bounce by Mary Rachel Brown. 22 February – 6 April 2019
- Prima Facie by Suzie Miller. 17 May – 22 June 2019
- City of Gold by Meyne Wyatt. 26 July – 31 August 2019
- Splinter by Hilary Bell. 6 September – 12 October 2019
- First Love Is The Revolution by Rita Kalnejais. 6 September – 12 October 2019

=== 2018 season ===
- Kill Climate Deniers by David Finnigan. 23 February – 7 April 2018
- Good Cook. Friendly. Clean. by Brooke Robinson. 4 May – 16 June 2018
- The Almighty Sometimes by Kendall Feaver. 27 July – 8 September 2018
- The Feather in the Web by Nick Coyle. 5 October – 17 November 2018

=== 2017 season ===
- A Strategic Plan by Ross Mueller. 27 January – 11 March 2017
- The Homosexuals or 'Faggots' by Declan Greene. 17 March – 29 April 2017
- Rice by Michele Lee. 21 July – 26 August 2017
- Diving For Pearls by Katherine Thomson. 8 September – 28 October 2017

=== 2016 season ===
- Ladies Day by Alana Valentine. 5 February – 26 March 2016
- Replay by Phillip Kavanagh. 2 April – 7 May 2016
- The Literati by Justin Fleming. 27 May – 16 July 2016
- Gloria by Benedict Andrews. 26 August – 8 October 2016
- The Turquoise Elephant by Stephen Carleton. 14 October – 16 November 2016

=== 2015 season ===
- Masquerade by Kate Mulvany. 7–17 January 2015
- Caress/Ache by Suzie Miller. 27 February – 11 April 2015
- The House on the Lake by Aidan Fennessy. 15 May – 20 June 2015
- The Bleeding Tree by Angus Cerini. 31 July – 5 September 2015
- A Rabbit for Kim Jong-il by Kit Brookman. 9 October – 21 November 2015

=== 2014 season ===
- Emerald City by David Williamson. 17 October – 6 December 2014
- The Witches by Roald Dahl, adapted from the stage play by David Wood. 24 September – 5 October 2014
- Ugly Mugs by Peta Brady. 18 July – 24 August 2014
- Eight Gigabytes of Hardcore Pornography by Declan Greene. 2 May – 14 June 2014
- Jump for Jordan by Donna Abela 14 February – 29 March 2014
- The Serpent's Table by Darren Yap and Lee Lewis. 24–27 January 2014

=== 2013 season ===
- Dreams in White - by Duncan Graham. 8 February – March 2013
- The Bull, the Moon and the Coronet of Stars – by Van Badham. 2 May – June 2013
- Beached – by Melissa Bubnic. 17 July 31 August 2013
- The Floating World – by John Romeril. 4 October – 16 November 2013

=== 2012 season ===
- The Boys – by Gordon Graham. 6 January – 3 March 2012
- The Story of Mary MacLane by Herself – by Bojana Novakovic, music by Tim Rogers, after the writings of Mary MacLane. 4 April – 12 May 2012
- Angela's Kitchen – by Paul Capsis and Julian Meyrick. 15 May – 9 June 2012
- A Hoax – by Rick Viede. 20 July – 1 September 2012
- Between Two Waves - by Ian Meadows. 5 October – 17 November 2012

=== 2011 season ===
- Speaking in Tongues – by Andrew Bovell. 4 February – 19 March 2011
- Silent Disco – by Lachlan Philpott. 22 April – 4 June 2011
- And No More Shall We Part – by Tom Holloway. 29 July – 3 September 2011
- This Year's Ashes – by Jane Bodie. 7 October – 19 November 2011
- Museum of Broken Relationships - by the Griffin Audience, in collaboration with Ian Meadows, Kate Mulvany, Shannon Murphy, Paige Rattray

=== 2010 season ===
- Graces – by Angus Cerini, Elise Hearst and Lachlan Philpott. 14 September – 7 December 2010
- Love Me Tender – by Tom Holloway. 18 March – 11 April 2010
- Like a Fishbone by Anthony Weigh. 16 July – 7 August 2010
- Quack by Ian Wilding. 27 August – 2 October 2010
- Angela's Kitchen by Paul Capsis and Julian Meyrick / Associate Writer Hilary Bell. 5 November – 18 December 2010

=== 2009 season ===
- The Fates – by Kamarra Bell-Wykes, Jonathan Ari Lander and Catherine Ryan. 19 May – November 2009
- Holiday – by Ranters Theatre. 4–28 February 2009
- Concussion by Ross Mueller. 13 March – 4 April 2009
- The Call – by Patricia Cornelius. 1 May – 6 June 2009
- Savage River – by Steve Rodgers. 12 June – 8 July 2009
- Strange Attractor – by Sue Smith. 23 October – 21 November 2009

=== 2008 season ===
- Seasons – by Nicki Bloom, Jonathan Gavin, Sue Smith and Rick Viede. 19 January – 8 February 2008
- China – by William Yang. 19 January – 8 February 2008
- The Kid – by Michael Gow. 22 March – 26 April 2008
- Don't Say The Words – by Tom Holloway. 4–26 July 2008
- The Modern International Dead – by Damien Millar. 12 September – 11 October 2008
- Tender – by Nicki Bloom. 21 November – 20 December 2008
- Impractical Jokes – by Charlie Pickering. 23 January – 2 February 2008

=== 2007 season ===
- Holding the Man – Adapted by Tommy Murphy. from the book by Timothy Conigrave 8 February – 3 March 2007
- The Nightwatchman – by Daniel Keene. 9 March – 18 April 2007
- October – by Ian Wilding. 20 April – 26 May 2007
- The Story of the Miracles at Cookie's Table – by Wesley Enoch. 10 August – 22 September 2007
- King Tide – by Katherine Thomson. 18 October – 24 November 2007
- The Seven Needs – by 7-ON. (Donna Abela, Vanessa Bates, Hilary Bell, Noëlle Janaczewska, Verity Laughton, Ned Manning and Catherine Zimdahl) 27 March – 13 November 2007
- The Emperor of Sydney – by Louis Nowra. 16 August – 23 September 2007

== Commissioned and premiered works ==
Playwrights whose work has premiered at Griffin include:

- Glenda Adams – The Monkey Trap (1998)
- Richard Barrett – The Heartbreak Kid (1987)
- Hilary Bell – Wolf Lullaby (1996), The Falls (2000)
- Andrew Bovell – After Dinner (1989), Whisky on the Breath of a Drunk You Love (1992), Speaking in Tongues (1996), Ship of Fools (1999)
- Brendan Cowell – Rabbit (2003)
- Timothy Daly – Kafka Dances (1993), The Moonwalkers (1995), Private Visions of Gottfried Kellner (1999)
- Wesley Enoch – The Story of the Miracles at Cookie's Table (2007)
- Gordon Graham – The Boys (1991)
- Michael Gow – Away (1986), Europe (1987), Live Acts on Stage (1996)
- Noel Hodda – The Secret House (1987), Half Safe (1990),
- Ingle Knight – White Nancy (1982)
- Ned Manning – Us or Them (1984), Belonging (2007)
- Tommy Murphy – Strangers in Between (2005), Holding the Man (Adapted from the book by Timothy Conigrave, 2006)
- Louis Nowra – Death of Joe Orton, The Boyce Trilogy: The Woman with Dog's Eyes (2004), The Marvellous Boy (2005), The Emperor of Sydney (2006)
- Debra Oswald – Mr Bailey's Minder (2004), The Peach Season (2006)
- Stephen Sewell – The Father We Loved on a Beach by the Sea (1981), In Stillness My Sister Speaks to Me (1990), The Secret Death of Salvador Dali (2004), Three Furies Scenes from the life of Francis Bacon (2005)
- Katherine Thomson – Wonderlands (2003), King Tide (2007)
- Ian Wilding – Below (2000), Torrez (2004), October (2007)
- Catherine Zimdahl – Clark in Sarajevo (1998)
