= Phillip Scott (actor) =

Australian actor, singer, pianist, writer and comedian

- Born: 16 August 1952 (age 74); Sydney, New South Wales, Australia
- Education: University of Sydney
- Occupations: Actor, comedian, singer, pianist, composer, novelist

Phillip Scott (born 16 August 1952) is an Australian actor, singer, pianist, writer and comedian.

== Career ==
He has appeared on film as well as in sketch comedy television programs. His television appearances include The Dingo Principle and Three Men and a Baby Grand, satirical sketch television comedy programs for which he was a writer/performer with Jonathan Biggins and Drew Forsythe. He also appeared with Max Gillies in The Gillies Report and its sequels, The Gillies Republic and Gillies and Company, and was a writer/performer on ABC TV's The Big Gig and a regular writer for Good News Week.

He (wrote the music for, played piano) and Max Gillies starred in "Night of National Reconciliation" during 1983 at Kinselas, Taylor Square, Darlinghurst, Sydney.

From 2000 to 2017 he co-wrote, composed and performed as an actor/musician in the award-winning Wharf Revue series of political satirical revues for the Sydney Theatre Company, including Free Petrol, Sunday in Iraq with George, Much Revue About Nothing, Pennies from Kevin and Open for Business. Other cabaret shows include The Twink and the Showgirl with Vincent Hooper, and co-writing script (with Dean Bryant) and musical arrangements for the bio-show Newley Discovered which premiered at the Adelaide Cabaret Festival in 2009 and starred Hugh Sheridan. Phillip co-created several shows with singer/actor Trevor Ashley, including Gentlemen Prefer Blokes, Fat Swan, Little Orphan Trashley, and the tribute shows Diamonds Are For Trevor and Liza's Back (Is Broken). His recent cabaret shows (as writer and performer) are Mario, about the life and music of Mario Lanza, with Blake Bowden, and Reviewing the Situation, about the English songwriter Lionel Bart. The latter show was co-written and directed by Terence O'Connell, and was nominated for a Helpmann Award in 2016.

His musical theatre writing credits (as composer and/or co-writer) include Safety in Numbers for the Q Theatre and Ensemble Theatre, a new libretto of Orpheus in the Underworld for Opera Australia (2003, revised 2015), and the AWGIE Award-winning musical The Republic of Myopia (2004). The Sydney Theatre Company production of The Republic of Myopia starred Helen Dallimore, Tamsin Carroll and Simon Gleeson. He was script consultant on the book of Priscilla, Queen of the Desert – the Stage Musical (2006). He also wrote music and lyrics for Monkey Baa Theatre Company's children shows Pearlie in the Park (based on the book by Wendy Harmer), Millie and Jack and the Dancing Cat, and Pete the Sheep (based on the book by Jackie French). Another upcoming Jackie French adaptation, Josephine Wants to Dance is slated for 2018.

Scott composed the score for the 1987 feature film Those Dear Departed, for which he was nominated for an AFI Award. Scott also co-wrote the music for the miniseries Bodyline.

He has written four novels. Three have been published in the United States by Alyson Books: One Dead Diva, Gay Resort Murder Shock and Mardi Gras Murders. He has written weekly columns for Sydney's free papers SX and The Sydney Star Observer.

Scott has a music degree from the University of Sydney, and writes reviews for the international classical CD magazine Fanfare and the Australian national music magazine "Limelight".

== Filmography ==
=== Film ===
Year	Title	Role	Type
1987	Bullseye	Piano Player	Feature film
1987	Those Dear Departed	Bow-tied Bon Vivant (uncredited)	Feature film
1993	The Nostradamus Kid	'General Booth Enters Heaven' Strolling Player	Feature film
1995	Billy's Holiday	Liberace	Feature film
2003	Fat Pizza	Jeholy Witness	Feature film
2011	A Few Best Men	Celebrant Robin Arthur	Feature film
2012	Housos vs Authority	Senator	Feature film

=== Television ===
Year	Title	Role	Type
1984-85	The Gillies Report	Various characters	TV series
1994	Maralinga, or Wise After the Event	Performer	Video
1985	Winners	Pianist	TV series, 1 episode
1986	The Gillies Republic		TV series, 6 episodes
1987	The Dingo Principle	Various characters	TV series
1990	The Party Machine	Various characters	TV series, 3 episodes
1991	Tuesday Night Live: The Big Gig	Various characters	TV series, 11 episodes
1992	Kittson Fahey	Various characters	TV series
1992	Gillies and Company	Various characters	TV series
1994	Three Men and a Baby Grand	Various characters	TV series
2003–07	Pizza	Prime Minister John Howard	TV series, 2 episodes
2011	The Jesters	Toby Linville	TV series, 1 episode

== Theatre ==
Year	Title	Role	Type
1974	The Audition	Actor	AMP Theatrette, Sydney
1975	The Cool Duenna	Composer	Marian Street Theatre
1976	I Do! I Do!	Musical Director	Marian Street Theatre
1976	Tarantara! Tarantara!	Mr White (also Musical Director)	Australian national tour with Marian Street Theatre
1977	A Funny Thing Happened on the Way to the Forum	Musical Director	Marian Street Theatre
1977	The Tempest	Musician, Keyboardist	Sydney Opera House with Old Tote Theatre Company for Fesrival of Sydney
1978	Miss Julie	Musical Advisor	Sydney Opera House with Old Tote Theatre Company
1978	Hay Fever	Composer	Canberra Theatre Centre, Sydney Opera House with Old Tote Theatre Company
1978	A Lad 'n' His Lamp	Musical Arranger	Marian Street Theatre
1978	Jumpers	Musical Director	Nimrod Upstairs for Festival of Sydney
1980	Exercise in Three	Playwright	Playhouse Canberra with Last Ditch Theatre Company
1980	Little Red Riding Hood	Musical Director	Phillip Street Theatre
1980	Kiss Me, Kate	Musical Director	Marian Street Theatre
1981	Privates on Parade	Actor / Pianist (also Musical Director)	Q Theatre, Penrith, Seymour Centre, Theatre Royal, Hobart, Burnie Theatre, Princess Theatre, Launceston
1981	Dick Whittington and His Cat	Musical Director	Phillip Street Theatre
1981-82	The Rocky Horror Show	Musical Director	Australian national tour
1982	Flash Jim	Actor	Nimrod Upstairs
1982	A Night with the Right	Composer / Writer	Nimrod Downstairs
1982-83	Safety in Numbers	Writer	Q Theatre, Penrith, Orange Civic Theatre, Ensemble Theatre, The Hole in the Wall Theatre Perth
1983	Night of National Reconciliation	Pianist	Kinselas, Sydney
1984	Zen and Now	Actor (also Playwright / Musical Director)	The Sett Up for Adelaide Fringe Festival
1984	A Toast to Melba	Actor (also musical director)	Nimrod Upstairs
1986	Tomfoolery	Actor	Seymour Centre for Festival of Sydney
1986	Sendire Sat-ups and Song	Performer	Canberra Theatre Centre
1986	Nothing Like a Dame	Writer	Kinselas
1987	Zen and Now	Actor (also Playwright)	SWY Theatre Perth
1989	Lipstick Dreams	Composer	Playhouse Newcastle
1991	Three Men and a Baby Grand	Devisor / Musician	Tilbury Hotel Woolloomooloo, Playhouse Newcastle, Fairfax Studio Melbourne, Space Theatre Adelaide
1992	An Evening with Wendy Harmer and Dillie Keane	Musician	Lion Arts Centre
1992	Love Letters	Actor	Tasmania with Mummers Theatre Company
1992	Good Enough to be Famous	Actor (also Creator)	Tilbury Hotel Woolloomooloo
1993	The Grand Opening Galah	Comedian	Canberra Theatre Centre with Comedy Summit
1993	The Friday Night Comedy Summit	Comedian	Canberra Theatre Centre with Comedy Summit
1994	Pavlova: Queen of the Desserts	Actor (also Musical Director)	Tilbury Hotel Woolloomooloo
1996	Getting Stuffed	Performer	Glen Street Theatre
1996	Tilbury Hotel 10th Anniversary Gala	Performer	Tilbury Hotel
1996	Yesterday is Now	Musical Director	Tilbury Hotel, Queanbeyan School of Arts Cafe
1996-97	Abroad with Two Men	Musical Director	Melbourne International Comedy Festival & Australian national tour
1997	Wunnerful Liberace	Musician / Playwright	Wharf Theatre with STC & Sydney Gay and Lesbian Mardi Gras
1997	Su Cruikshank and Phil Scott	Performer	135 Bar and Grill, Sydney
1998	Tilly's Turn	Musical Supervisor	Stables Theatre
2000	The End of the Wharf as We Know It	Writer	Wharf Revue at Wharf Theatre with Sydney Theatre Company
2000	Sunday in Iraq with George	Actor (also Writer)	Wharf Revue at Wharf Theatre with STC
2000	Serious Cabaret	Performer	Cafe 9, Sydney
2001	The Best Bits of That Broad and Those Men	Performer (also Devisor)	Glen Street Theatre
2001	Free Petrol	Actor (also Writer)	Wharf Revue at Wharf Theatre with STC
2001	Serious Cabaret	Performer (also Devisor)	Banquet Room Adelaide, Glen Street Theatre, Cafe 8 Sydney
2001	Wharf Revue	Performer	Dunstan Playhouse Adelaide
2001	Phil Scott in Serious Cabaret	Performer	Street Theatre Studio Canberra
2001	Quiz Night	MC	Cabaret East Sydney
2001	Free Petrol Too	Actor / Writer	Wharf Revue at Wharf Theatre with STC
2001	Hats Off!	Performer	Star City
2001	Wendy Live: Up Late and Loving It	Musician	Wharf Theatre with STC
2002	Oh! What a Night	Adaptor	State Theatre Melbourne
2002	The Year of Living Comfortably	Actor	Wharf Revue at Wharf Theatre with STC
2001	Serious Cabaret: Phil Scott	Performer / Musician (also Creator)	Chapel Off Chapel
2002	The Man from Snowy River: Arena Spectacular	Extra dialogue	Australian national tour
2002	Much Revue About Nothing	Performer	Wharf Revue with STC
2003	Phil Scott in Out Loud	Performer / Musician (also Creator)	Chapel Off Chapel
2002	The Year of Living Comfortably	Performer	Wharf Revue at Riverside Theatres Parramatta with STC
2003	Muf-Tee	Actor	Stables Theatre
2003	Trevor Ashley Pop Princess	Writer	Chapel Off Chapel
2003	Orpheus in the Underworld	Librettist	Sydney Opera House, State Theatre Melbourne
2004	The Republic of Myopia	Musician / Pianist (also Writer / Musical Director)	Sydney Theatre Company
2004	Fast and Loose	Performer	Wharf Revue at Glen Street Theatre with STC
2005	Concert for Tax Relief	Musician (also Writer)	Wharf Theatre with STC
2005	The Q Story	Actor	Q Theatre, Penrith
2005	Pearlie in the Park	Composer	Seymour Centre
2005-06	Stuff All Happens	Performer (also Writer)	Wharf Revue at Wharf Theatre, Theatre Royal, Hobart & NSW tour with STC
2006	The Illusion	Actor	Darlinghurst Theatre
2006	Best We Forget	Writer	Wharf Theatre with STC
2006	Revue Sans Frontieres	Musical Director / Writer	Wharf Revue at Wharf Theatre, Lennox Theatre Parramatta with STC
2007	Pearlie in the Park	Composer	Frankston Arts Centre, Clocktower Centre Moonee Ponds, Her Majesty's Theatre Ballarat, Darebin Arts and Entertainment Centre
2007	My Long Awaited Comeback	Performer (also Writer)	The Butterfly Club Melbourne
2007	Up Close and Musical	Singer	Theatre Royal, Sydney
2007	The Tempest	Actor (also Composer / Sound Designer)	Bondi Pavilion
2007-08	Beware of the Dogma	Performer (also Writer / Musical Director)	Wharf Revue at Wharf Theatre & Australian national tour
2008	Revue Sans Frontieres		Banquet Room Adelaide with Sydney Theatre Company
2008	Milli, Jack and the Dancing Cat	Musical Director	Australian national tour
2008	Waiting for Garnaut	Performer (also Musical Director)	Wharf Revue at Wharf Theatre, Casula Powerhouse with Sydney Theatre Company
2008	Beware of the Dogma	Performer (also Writer / Musical Director)	Wharf Revue at Illawarra Performing Arts Centre
2008	Priscilla, Queen of the Desert	Dramaturge / Script Consultant	Lyric Theatre Sydney
2009	The Twink and the Showgirl	Performer	The Butterfly Club Melbourne
2009	Orpheus in the Underworld	Adaptor	Scott Theatre Adelaide
2009-10	Pennies from Kevin	Actor	Wharf Revue at Wharf Theatre & Australian national tour with Sydney Theatre Company
2010	Gentlemen Prefer Blokes	Writer	Theatre Works St Kilda
2010	Hugh Sheridan in Newley Discovered	Devisor	Dunstan Playhouse, Sydney Opera House
2010	A Day in the Death of Joe Egg	Composer	Australian national tour
2010	Not Quite Out of the Woods	Performer (also Creator / Musical Director)	Wharf Revue at Wharf Theatre with Sydney Theatre Company
2011	Debt Defying Acts	Performer (also Creator / Musical Director )	Wharf Revue Australian national tour with Sydney Theatre Company
2011	Fat Swan	Writer	Seymour Centre
2012	The Unspeakable Itch	Songwriter	Darlinghurst Theatre
2011-12	Red Wharf: Beyond the Rings of Satire	Writer	Wharf Revue at Wharf Theatre, Canberra Theatre Centre, Dame Joan Sutherland Performing Arts Centre, Lennox Theatre Parramatta with Sydney Theatre Company
2013	Whoops!	Creator / Writer	Wharf Revue at Wharf Theatre, Dame Joan Sutherland Performing Arts Centre, Riverside Theatres Parramatta, Casula Powerhouse, Glen Street Theatre, Canberra Theatre Centre with Sydney Theatre Company
2013	Torch Song Trilogy	Musical Director	Darlinghurst Theatre
2013	Phil Scott: Cabaret Survivor	Performer	Space Theatre, Adelaide at Adelaide Cabaret Festival
2014, 2017	Mario: The Story and Music of Mario Lanza	Performer (also Creator / Writer)	Festival Theatre, Adelaide with Adelaide Cabaret Festival, Courtyard Theatre, Canberra
2014	Pete the Sheep	Lyricist	Australian national tour
2014	Open for Business	Performer (also Writer / Creator)	Wharf Revue at Dame Joan Sutherland Performing Arts Centre, Riverside Theatres Parramatta, Illawarra Performing Arts Centre, Casula Powerhouse, Canberra Theatre Centre, Glen Street Theatre with STC
2014, 2017	Reviewing The Situation	Lionel Bart (also Writer)	Artspace, Adelaide, Chapel Off Chapel, Hayes Theatre Co
2015-20	The Wharf Revue 2015 - Celebrating 15 Years	Performer (also Writer / Musical Director)	Illawarra Performing Arts Centre, Dame Joan Sutherland Performing Arts Centre, Riverside Theatres Parramatta, Playhouse Canberra, Her Majesty's Theatre, Adelaide, Wharf Theatre, Byron Theatre & Online with STC
2015	Up Late With...	Performer	Alex Theatre, St. Kilda for Melbourne Cabaret Festival
2016	Trevor Ashley in Liza's Back! (is broken)	Creator	Fairfax Studio, Melbourne
2016	The Best Little Whorehouse in Texas	Ci Scruggs / The Governor	Seymour Centre
2016	Rhonda Burchmore and Trevor Ashley: Twins	Writer	Dunstan Playhouse
2016	Pete the Sheep	Music / lyrics	The Art House Wyong, Fairfax Studio Melbourne, Sydney Opera House
2016	Back to Bite You	Performer (also Creator / Musical Director)	Wharf Revue at Wharf Theatre with STC
2016	The Wharf Revue 2016	Performer (also Musical Director)	Theatre Royal, Hobart, Newcastle Civic Theatre, Dame Joan Sutherland Performing Arts Centre, IMB Theatre Wollongong with STC
2016	Reviewing the Situation		Helpmann Award nominee
2017	Wharf Revue 2017	Performer (also Musical Director / Writer)	Canberra Theatre Centre, Wharf Theatre with STC
2019	Wharf Revue 2019	Writer	Roslyn Packer Theatre
2020-22	Good Night and Good Luck	Various characters	Wharf Revue at Roslyn Packer Theatre, Majestic Cinemas, Riverside Theatres Parramatta with STC
2021	Can of Worms		Wharf Revue at Seymour Centre with STC
2022	30 Something	Performer	Space Theatre, Adelaide, Hayes Theatre
	Dr Pangloss	Narrator	Sydney Opera House

== Personal life ==
Scott was married and has two daughters. He has been in a relationship with his partner Michael for over twenty years. His elder daughter, Dr. Phoebe Scott, is a curator at the National Gallery of Singapore. His younger daughter, Georgie Scott, is an actress.
