= Drew Forsythe =

Australian actor, singer, writer, and comedian

- Born: 23 August 1949 (age 77); Sydney, New South Wales, Australia
- Occupations: Actor; singer; writer; comedian; voice actor
- Family: Abe Forsythe (son)

Drew Forsythe (born 23 August 1949) is an Australian actor, singer, writer, and comedian. He has appeared on film, stage, and television, as well as in satirical sketch comedy television programs.

== Early life ==
Born in New South Wales to newsagent parents, Forsythe attended Atherton Primary School, far north Queensland.. He caught the acting bug when The Young Elizabethan Players performed Hamlet (featuring Kirrily Nolan as Ophelia) at his Charters Towers high school. Forsythe went on to study acting at National Institute of Dramatic Art (NIDA), graduating in 1969.

== Career ==
=== Theatre ===
The title roles of the heroic Tonino and the foolish Zanetto in the Nick Enright/Terence Clarke musical, The Venetian Twins, were written for Forsythe. He originated these dual roles for Nimrod Theatre Company in the first Sydney Theatre Company season in 1979, and subsequently in two revivals.

Playwright David Williamson wrote Flatfoot for Forsythe, in which he played eleven different characters and a parrot.

Together with Jonathan Biggins and Phillip Scott, Forsythe was a creator, writer, and performer of Three Men and a Baby Grand which started at the Tilbury Hotel in Woolloomooloo. It went on to tour Australia-wide, at the Edinburgh Festival, and with the Sydney Symphony Orchestra, and was also adapted as a television series for the ABC. The same team went on to create the Wharf Revue for the Sydney Theatre Company.

Other stage appearances include the Gilbert and Sullivan comic operas H.M.S. Pinafore and The Mikado for Essgee Entertainment, receiving a Melbourne Green Room Award as Ko-Ko in The Mikado in 1995.

=== Film ===
Forsythe appeared in the films Stone, Caddie, Newsfront, Annie's Coming Out, Ginger Meggs, Burke & Wills, Travelling North and Billy's Holiday. He featured as the narrator in the film Ned, which was written and directed by and starred his son, Abe Forsythe.

He received the 1976 Australian Film Institute Award for Best Actor in a Supporting Role, for his role in Caddie.

=== Television ===
Forsythe has featured in television roles on The Miraculous Mellops, The Dingo Principle and Hotel Bordemer. He has also made guest appearances on a number of popular television series, including Cop Shop, A Country Practice, G.P., BackBerner, All Saints, and Packed to the Rafters.

He provided the anonymous, uncredited voice of David Tench, an animated host on Network Ten's short-lived comedy talk show David Tench Tonight. Likewise, he also voiced several characters on the Australian award-winning animated series I Got a Rocket, as well as characters on Fairy Tale Police Department and The Adventures of Blinky Bill.

=== Radio ===
Forsythe is credited with singing the theme song for the ABC's long-running Sunday morning radio program, Australia All Over, hosted by Ian McNamara. For more than thirty years, when over 2 million listeners spanning every corner of Australia tune in from 5.30 am on Sunday mornings to listen to 'Macca' they are greeted by Forsythe singing - "Macca on a Sunday Morning".

== Filmography ==
=== Film ===
Year	Title	Role	Type
1973	The Taming of the Shrew		Teleplay
1973	How Could You Believe Me When I Said I'd Be Your Valet When You Know I've Been a Liar All My Life?		Teleplay
1974	Stone	Fred	Feature film
1974	Essington		TV movie
1975	They Don't Clap Losers	Priest	TV movie
1976	Caddie	Sonny	Feature film
1976	Deathcheaters	Battle Scene Director	Feature film
1978	Newsfront	Bruce	Feature film
1979	The Hero	Auditionee	Short film
1981	Around the World with Dot	Danny the Swagman (live) / Santa Claus (voice)	Animated TV film
1981	Doctors and Nurses	Katz	Feature film
1982	Ginger Meggs	Tiger Kelly	Feature film
1983	Dot and the Bunny	Koala (voice)	Animated TV film
1984	Annie's Coming Out	David Lewis	Feature film
1985	Burke & Wills	William Brahe	Feature film
1986	The Movers	John	TV movie
1987	Travelling North	Martin	Feature film
1989	Minnamurra (aka Outback or Wrangler)	Henry Iverson	Feature film
1993	The Nostradamus Kid	'General Booth Enters Heaven' Strolling Player	Feature film
1995	Billy's Holiday	Sid Banks	Feature film
1996	The Mikado	Ko-Ko	TV movie
1997	H.M.S. Pinafore	The Rt. Hon. Sir Joseph Porter K.C.B.	TV movie
2002	Six Days Straight	Arthur	Short film
2003	Ned	Narrator	Feature film
2006	The Last Chip	Pit Boss Trevor	Short film

=== Television ===
Year	Title	Role	Type
1974	Three Men of the City	Ken Styles	TV miniseries, 2 episodes
1974	Behind the Legend	Ted Baxter	TV series, 1 episode
1975	The Company Men	Ken Elliott	TV miniseries, 2 episodes
1976	The Emigrants	Peter	TV miniseries, 1 episode
1981	Cop Shop	Sid Moody / Murray Paxton	TV series, 4 episodes
1984	Breakout	Host	Documentary
1984-91	A Country Practice	Noel Lewis / Phil Pratt	TV series, 3 episodes
1985	Runaway Island	Bloat	TV series, 2 episodes
1986	Land of Hope	Old Frank Quinn	TV miniseries
1986	Whose Baby?	Bill Morrison	TV miniseries, 2 episodes
1987	The Dingo Principle	Various characters	TV series
1989-93	G.P.	Leon Winters	TV series, 3 episodes
1990	The Party Machine	Various characters	TV series, 3 episodes
1991-92	The Miraculous Mellops	Ralph	TV series, 26 episodes
1994	Three Men and a Baby Grand	Various characters	TV series
1998	Driven Crazy	Sidney Drayton Mousechap	TV series, season 1, episode 12: "Mousechap"
2001-05	Fairy Tale Police Department	Chief Horace White (voice)	Animated TV series, 26 episodes
2002	BackBerner	Martin	TV series, 1 episode
2002-07	All Saints	Ray McCarthy / Dale Caulder	TV series, 3 episodes
2004	The Adventures of Blinky Bill	Voice	Animated TV series, season 3
2005	Hotel Bordemer		TV series, 19 episodes
2006	Staines Down Drains	Dr Drain	TV series, 2 episodes
2006-07	David Tench Tonight	David Tench (voice)	TV series
2006-07	I Got a Rocket!	Ma Ducky / Biffo Ducky / Scuds Ducky / Captain O'Cheese / Pirate (voices)	Animated TV series, 23 episodes
2007	Chandon Pictures	Graham Tucker	TV series, 1 episode
2008	Packed to the Rafters	Fred Mackie	TV series, 1 episode
2011	At Home with Julia	Bob Katter	TV series, 1 episode
2012	Devil’s Dust	Bob Carr	Animated TV series, 2 episodes

=== As writer ===
Year	Title	Role	Type
1987	The Dingo Principle	Writer	TV series
1990	The Party Machine	Writer	TV series, 3 episodes
1994	Three Men and a Baby Grand	Writer	TV series
1996	The Mikado	Additional material	TV movie
1997	H.M.S. Pinafore	Additional material	TV movie

== Stage ==
=== As actor ===
Year	Title	Role	Type
1968	The Room	Mr Kidd	Production course graduation play at Jane Street Theatre
1968	Hippolytus	Servant	Jane Street Theatre
1968	Dark of the Moon	Preacher / Haggler	Jane Street Theatre
1969	Lock Up Your Daughters	Justic Squeezum	NIDA Theatre
1969	Miss Jairus	Jairus	University of NSW, Old Tote Theatre
1969	The Crucible	Reverend Samuel Paris	University of NSW with Old Tote Theatre
1970	This Story of Yours		University of NSW Parade Theatre with Old Tote Theatre
1970	Major Barbara		Canberra Theatre & University of NSW Parade Theatre with Old Tote Theatre
1970	The Hostage		University of NSW Parade Theatre with Old Tote Theatre
1970	Biggles	Ginger	Nimrod Theatre Company
1971	King Oedipus	Chorus	Princess Theatre, Melbourne, Octagon Theatre, Perth & University of Adelaide
1971	The Resistible Rise of Arturo Ui		University of NSW Parade Theatre & Canberra Theatre Centre with Old Tote Theatre
1971	The Dutch Courtesan		University of NSW Parade Theatre with Old Tote Theatre
1971	The National Health or Nurse Norton's Affair		University of NSW Parade Theatre with Old Tote Theatre
1971	Lasseter		University of NSW Parade Theatre with Old Tote Theatre
1972	Tartuffe		University of NSW Parade Theatre with Old Tote Theatre
1972	Julius Caesar		University of NSW
1972	Forget-Me-Not Lane		University of NSW Parade Theatre with Old Tote Theatre
1972	How Could You Believe Me When I Said I'd Be Your Valet When You Know I've Been a Liar All My Life?		University of NSW Parade Theatre & Canberra Theatre Centre with Old Tote Theatre
1973	'Tis Pity She's a Whore		University of NSW Parade Theatre with Old Tote Theatre
1973	King Richard II		Sydney Opera House
1973	The Threepenny Opera		Sydney Opera House
1973	What If You Died Tomorrow?		Sydney Opera House & Elizabethan Theatre
1973	Arsenic and Old Lace	Mortimer	Old Tote Theatre
1974	The Seagull	Kosta	Nimrod Theatre Company
1974	The Bacchoi		Nimrod Theatre Company
1974	What If You Died Tomorrow?		Comedy Theatre, London
1975	Much Ado About Nothing	Dogberry	Nimrod Theatre Company
1976	All Good Men		Stables Theatre
1976	The Speakers	Harry / Policeman / Doctor / Davies Drug-pusher	Nimrod Theatre Company
1976	Are You Now or Have You Ever Been	Larry Parks / Tony Kraber / Elliott Sullivan / Marc Lawrence	Nimrod Theatre Company
1976	The Shoemaker's Holiday	Ralph Damport	Sydney Opera House
1976	A Toast to Melba	GB Shaw / Duke of Orleans / Wedekind / Sir Thomas Beecham	University of NSW Parade Theatre with Old Tote Theatre
1977	The Magistrate	Cis Farringdon	Sydney Opera House
1977	Twelfth Night	Sir Andrew Aguecheek	Nimrod Theatre Company
1977	Much Ado About Nothing	Dogberry	Nimrod Theatre Company
1977	Any Fool Can	Peter Wilkins	Bondi Pavilion
1978	The Comedy of Errors	Dromio of Syracuse	Nimrod Theatre Company
1978	Henry IV	Bardoplh	Nimrod Theatre Company
1978-79	The Club	Danny	Canberra Theatre, Her Majesty's Theatre, Brisbane, Theatre Royal, Sydney, Orange Civic Theatre, Dapto Leagues Club & St George Leagues Club
1978	Gone with Hardy	Stanley Jefferson	Nimrod Theatre Company
1979	Incompletions	Herb	ABC Radio, Sydney
1979	Romeo and Juliet	Mercutio	Octagon Theatre, Perth & Nimrod Theatre Company
1979	The Life of Galileo	Doge of Venice / Thin Monk / Andrea Sarti	Nimrod Theatre Company
1979	The Venetian Twins	Tonino / Zanetto	Sydney Opera House with Nimrod Theatre Company & STC
1980	The Club	Danny	The Old Vic Theatre, London
1980	The Two Gentlemen of Verona - Open Rehearsal	Proteus / Thurio / Antonio	Seymour Centre
1981	Three Sisters	Nikolai Lvovich / Baron Tusenbach	Nimrod Theatre Company
1981	The Venetian Twins	Tonino / Zanetto	Seymour Centre, Canberra Theatre Centre, Festival Theatre, Adelaide, Her Majesty's Theatre, Melbourne & Geelong
1982	Amadeus	Mozart	Theatre Royal, Sydney with STC
1984	The Servant of Two Masters	The Servant	Nimrod Theatre Company for Festival of Sydney
1985	Shorts at the Wharf: Late Arrivals / Perfect Mismatch / The Bourgeois Wedding	Derelict / Husband	Wharf Theatre with STC
1986	Hedda Gabler	Tesman	Wharf Theatre with STC
1987	Emerald City	Mike	Playhouse Adelaide, Canberra Theatre Centre & Sydney Opera House
1988	Big and Little	The Man / Male Research Assistant / Bernard	Sydney Opera House with STC
1989	Big River: The Adventures of Huckleberry Finn	The King	Her Majesty's Theatre, Sydney, Lyric Theatre Brisbane & Her Majesty's Theatre, Melbourne for Essgee Entertainment
1990	The Venetian Twins	Tonino / Zanetto	Suncorp Theatre, Brisbane
1990	Love Letters		Sydney Opera House, University of Sydney & Playhouse, Melbourne
1990	Big River	The King	Her Majesty's Theatre, Sydney
1991	Three Men and a Baby Grand	Comedian	Tilbury Hotel, Playhouse Newcastle, Fairfax Studio Melbourne & Space Theatre, Adelaide
1992	The Trackers of Oxyrhynchus		Wharf Theatre with STC
1995	The Mikado	Ko-Ko	Australian national tour with Essgee Entertainment
1996	The Pirates of Penzance	Major-General Stanley	New Zealand with Essgee Entertainment
1997	H.M.S. Pinafore	Sir Joseph Porter	Australian national tour with Essgee Entertainment
1998	The Merry Widow	Njegus	Lyric Theatre, Brisbane with Essgee Entertainment
1998-99	A Funny Thing Happened on the Way to the Forum	Senex	Australian national tour with Essgee Entertainment
1999	The Imaginary Invalid		Ensemble Theatre
2000	The Unofficial Visitors Guide to Australia		Wharf Theatre with STC
2001	The Best Bits of That Broad and Those Men		Glen Street Theatre
2001	Wharf Revue		Dunstan Playhouse, Adelaide with STC
2002	Wharf Revue: The Year of Living Comfortably		Wharf Theatre & Riverside Theatres Parramatta with STC
2002	Volpone		Sydney Opera House
2002	Wharf Revue: Much Revue About Nothing		Wharf Theatre with STC
2003	The Way of the World		Sydney Opera House with STC
2004	Harbour		STC
2004	The Republic of Myopia	Dr Furtwangler	Roslyn Packer Theatre with STC
2004-05	Flatfoot	Titus Maccius Plautus playing various characters (including Pyrgopolynices, Palaestrio and Pleusicles)	Australian national tour
2004	Light on the Hill		Belvoir Street Theatre
2004	Wharf Revue: Fast and Loose		Glen Street Theatre with STC
2005	Broken Valley		Belvoir Street Theatre
2005	Navigating Flinders		Ensemble Theatre
2005	The Give and Take		Sydney Opera House with STC
2005	Wharf Revue: Stuff All Happens		Australian national tour
2006	Kookaburra Launch Concert	Singer	Lyric Theatre, Sydney with Kookaburra - the National Musical Theatre Company
2006	Wharf Revue: Best We Forget		Wharf Theatre with STC
2007-08	Wharf Revue: Beware of the Dogma	Alexander Downer	STC
2008	Wharf Revue: Revue Sans Frontieres		Banquet Room, Adelaide with STC
2008	Wharf Revue: Waiting for Garnaut		Casula Powerhouse & Wharf Theatre with STC
2009	The 39 Steps	Clown 2	Australian national tour & Lyric Theatre, Hong Kong
2009-10	Wharf Revue: Pennies from Kevin	Nick Xenophon & various characters	Australian national tour with STC
2010	Wharf Revue: Not Quite Out of the Woods		Wharf Theatre with STC
2010	L'Amphi Parnasso		The Song Company
	Carnival of the Humans		with Australian Chamber Orchestra
2012	Wharf Revue: Red Wharf: Beyond the Rings of Satire		Lennox Theatre, Parramatta, Dame Joan Sutherland Performing Arts Centre Penrith, Canberra Theatre Centre & Wharf Theatre with STC
2012	Under Milk Wood		Sydney Opera House with STC
2013	Mrs. Warren's Profession	The Fool	Riverside Theatres, Parramatta, Illawarra Performing Arts Centre, Wharf Theatre with STC
2014	Strictly Ballroom the Musical	Doug Hastings	Sydney Lyric Theatre
2015-20	Wharf Revue: Celebrating 15 Years	Malcolm Turnbull & various characters	Australian national tour & online with STC
2016	Wharf Revue: Back to Bite You		Wharf Theatre with STC
2016	Wharf Revue 2016		Theatre Royal, Hobart, Newcastle Civic Theatre, Dame Joan Sutherland Performing Arts Centre, IMB Theatre, Wollongong with STC
2017	Wharf Revue: The Patriotic Rag	Pauline Hanson & various characters	Canberra Theatre Centre & Wharf Theatre with STC
2018	Wharf Revue: Deja Revue	Queen Elizabeth, Pauline Hanson, Vladimir Putin & various characters	IMB Theatre, Wollongong with STC
2020	Wharf Revue: Good Night and Good Luck	Pauline Hanson & various characters	Roslyn Packer Theatre, Majestic Cinemas, Sydney & Riverside Theatres Parramatta with STC
2022	Wharf Revue: Looking for Albanese	Anthony Albanese, Pauline Hanson, 'The Mad Katter' & various characters	Canberra Theatre Centre & Seymour Centre with STC
2022	Wharf Revue: Can of Worms		Canberra Theatre Centre & Seymour Centre with STC
2023	Wharf Revue: Pride in Prejudice		Dunstan Playhouse & The Round, Melbourne

=== As writer ===
Year	Title	Role	Type
2000	Wharf Revue: The End of the Wharf as We Know It	Writer	Wharf Theatre with STC
2000	Wharf Revue: Sunday in Iraq with George: A Shock 'n' Awe-full Show	Writer	Wharf Theatre with STC
2001	Wharf Revue: Free Petrol!	Writer	Wharf Theatre with STC
2001	Wharf Revue: Free Petrol Too	Writer	Wharf Theatre with STC
2002	Wharf Revue: Much Revue About Nothing	Creator / writer	Wharf Theatre with STC
2004	The Republic of Myopia	Creator / writer	Roslyn Packer Theatre with STC
2005	Concert for Tax Relief	Writer	Wharf Theatre with STC
2006-08	Wharf Revue: Revue Sans Frontieres	Writer	Lennox Theatre, Parramatta & Wharf Theatre with STC
2007-08	Wharf Revue: Beware of the Dogma	Creator / writer	STC
2008	Wharf Revue: Waiting for Garnaut	Creator / writer	Casula Powerhouse & Wharf Theatre with STC
2009-10	Wharf Revue: Pennies from Kevin	Creator / writer	Australian national tour with STC
2010	Wharf Revue: Not Quite Out of the Woods	Creator / writer	Wharf Theatre with STC
2011-12	Wharf Revue: Debt Defying Acts	Creator / writer	Australian national tour with STC
2013	Wharf Revue: Whoops!	Creator / writer	Dame Joan Sutherland Performing Arts Centre, Riverside Theatres Parramatta, Casula Powerhouse, Glen Street Theatre, Canberra Theatre Centre & Wharf Theatre, with STC
2014	Wharf Revue: Open for Business	Creator / writer	Dame Joan Sutherland Performing Arts Centre, Riverside Theatres Parramatta, Casula Powerhouse, Canberra Theatre Centre, Glen Street Theatre & Wharf Theatre with STC
2015-20	Wharf Revue: Celebrating 15 Years	Creator / writer	Australian national tour & online with STC
2016	Wharf Revue: Back to Bite You	Creator / writer	Wharf Theatre with STC
2017	Wharf Revue: The Patriotic Rag	Creator / writer	Canberra Theatre Centre & Wharf Theatre with STC
2018	Wharf Revue: Deja Revue	Creator / writer	IMB Theatre, Wollongong with STC
2019	Wharf Revue: Unr-Dact-D	Creator / writer	Roslyn Packer Theatre with STC
2020	Wharf Revue: Good Night and Good Luck	Creator / co-director	Roslyn Packer Theatre, Majestic Cinemas, Sydney & Riverside Theatres Parramatta with STC
2022	Wharf Revue: Looking for Albanese	Creator / writer	Canberra Theatre Centre & Seymour Centre with STC
2022	Wharf Revue: Can of Worms	Creator / writer	Canberra Theatre Centre & Seymour Centre with STC
2024	Wharf Revue: Pride in Prejudice	Writer / Co-director	Dunstan Playhouse & The Round, Melbourne

== Awards & nominations ==
Year	Nominated work	Award	Category	Result
1976	Caddie	Australian Film Institute Awards	Best Actor in a Supporting Role	Won
	The Venetian Twins	Variety Awards	Best Actor in a Musical	Won
1987	Whose Baby	Penguin Awards	Best Actor in a Mini-Series	Won
1995	The Mikado	Green Room Awards	Male Actor in a Leading Role (Music Theatre)	Won
2019	Wharf Revue team	Sydney Theatre Awards	Award for services to laughter, satire and sanity above and beyond the call of duty	Won

== Personal life ==
Forsythe's son, Abe Forsythe, is an actor and director.
