= Genevieve Lemon =

Australian singer and actress (born 1958)

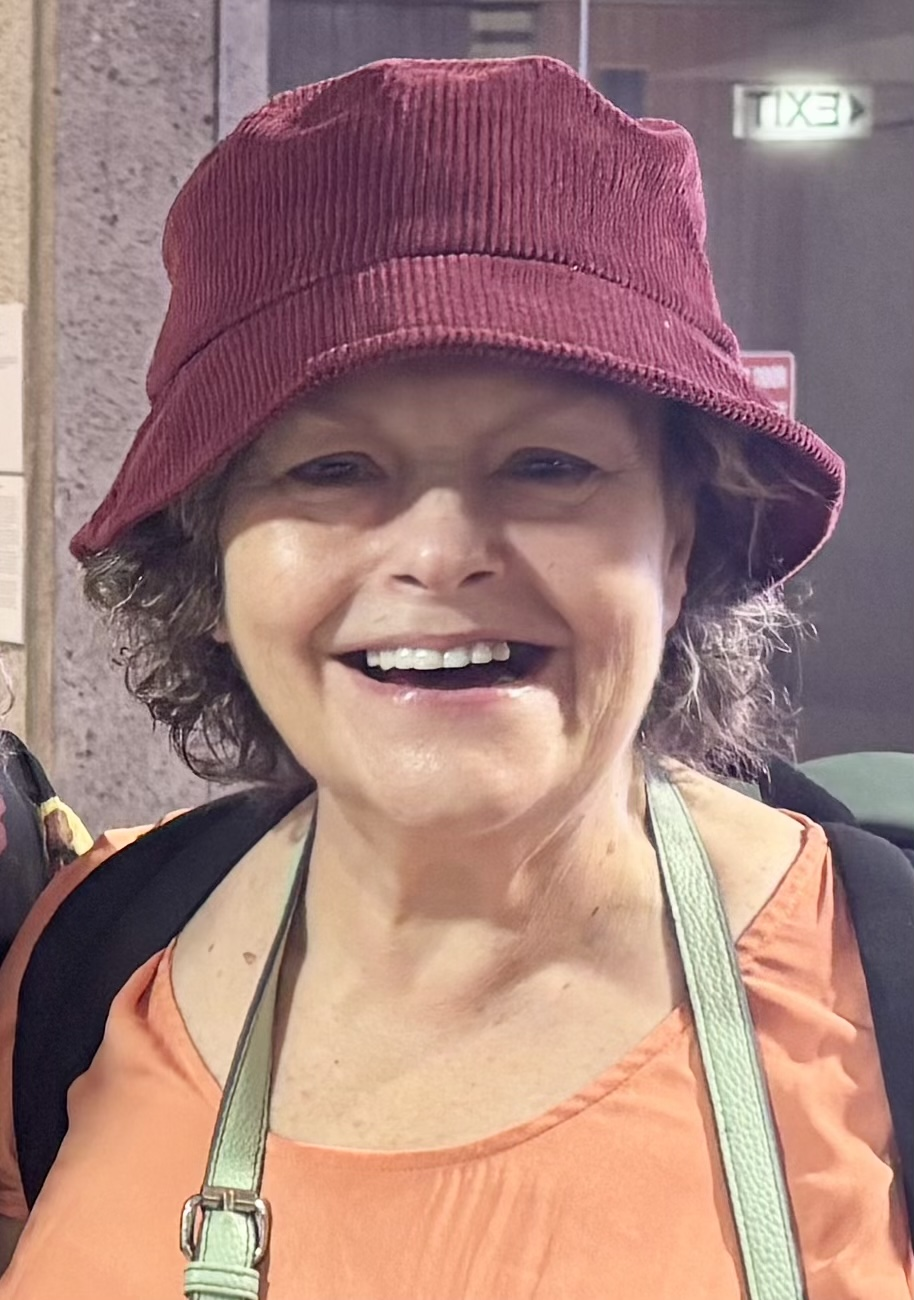
- Lemon in 2025
- Born: 1959 (age 66–67); Sydney, New South Wales, Australia
- Education: University of New South Wales
- Occupations: Actress, singer
- Years active: 1982–present
- Spouse: Colin Wilson (m. 1998)
- Children: Darcey Wilson

Genevieve Lemon (born 1959) is an Australian film and television actress and singer. She is a frequent collaborator of Jane Campion, including the Academy Award-winning The Piano (1993) and The Power of the Dog (2021), which earned her a Satellite Award as cast member and a Critic's Choice Awards nomination.

Lemon is known for her television soap opera roles including Zelda Baker in The Young Doctors, Marlene "Rabbit" Warren in Prisoner and Brenda Riley in Neighbours.

Lemon has also appeared in numerous musical and stage productions, performing in major Australian theatres, including the 2008 original Australian stage production of Billy Elliot the Musical in which she won the Helpmann Award for Best Leading Actress.

== Early life ==
Lemon was born at the Crown Street Women's Hospital, Sydney, New South Wales in 1959 as the third child of four to film editor and director Antony Cripps Lemon and actress Patricia Mary O'Donnell, whom had married in the early 1950s, her siblings include Michael, Andrew and Kim.

Lemon joined "The Rock Players" an amateur theatre company in the inner-city Sydney suburb of Leichhardt and after appeared in a production of the musical Steaming before attending and graduating the University of New South Wales in 1982.

== Career ==
Lemon's professional career began on television in 1982 in a role as Nurse Zelda Baker in the eighth season of The Young Doctors. This was followed with a guest role in soap opera Sons and Daughters. In 1984 Lemon starred as Marlene Warren in the television series Prisoner, receiving critical acclaim, winning a Penguin Award for her role.

Between 1985 and 1988 Lemon performed in numerous Australian musicals, working for the Sydney Theatre Company, after which she was cast as the lead actress in Jane Campion's film Sweetie. The latter role earned her a nomination at the AACTA Awards for Best Actress in a Leading Role, and she won in the same category at the AFCA Awards.

After guest appearances on the television series The Flying Doctors and G.P., Lemon was cast as Brenda Riley in the television series Neighbours between 1991 and 1992. In the same years she appeared in several theatre productions, including Summer Rain directed by Rodney Fisher, critically acclaimed The Venetian Twins directed by John Bell, and The Girl Who Saw Everything directed by Robyn Nevin.

In 1993, Lemon again acted under the direction of Jane Campion in the Academy Award-winning film The Piano, co-starring with Sam Neill, Holly Hunter and Harvey Keitel. Later she also acted in Australian television film Big Ideas and the ABC mini-series Seven Deadly Sins. After stage acting in director Aubrey Mellor's Brilliant Lies and director Rodney Fisher's And a Nightingale Sang, Lemon returned to film in the movie Billy's Holiday in 1995. In 1996 she performed in Miracle City by Nick Enright and Max Lambert, and Merrily We Roll Along directed by Wayne Harrison.

In 1997 Lemon was cast for Samantha Lang's film The Well acting with Pamela Rabe, Miranda Otto, Paul Chubb, and Frank Wilson. Over the next two years, she appeared in numerous theatre productions, including Taming of the Shrew directed by Glen Elston, Daylight Saving by Nick Enright, and in The Milemonum Project written and devised by Lemon and Russell Dykstra. In 1999 Jane Campion cast Lemon in the film Holy Smoke! and also appeared in Christina Andreff’s film Soft Fruit.

From 1999 to 2005 Lemon became an integral part of the casts of Sydney Theatre Company productions, appearing in the musical Piaf by Adam Cook, Morning Sacrifice by Jennifer Flowers, The Republic of Myopia by Jonathan Biggins, Summer Rain directed by Robyn Nevin, and My Brilliant Divorce directed by Gary Down. In 2003 Lemon acted in television films The Postcard Bandit and Mermaids.

== Recent years: Stage and screen ==
In 2006, after starring in Paul Goldman's film Suburban Mayhem, Lemon played as Shirley in Stephan Elliott and Allan Scott's critical acclaimed musical Priscilla, Queen of the Desert, touring between 2006 and 2008 the major theatres of Australia and New Zealand. In 2008 Lemon gave voice to Charlotte's Mum, Henry's Mum and Madame in the animated film The Adventures of Charlotte and Henry.

In 2007 Lemon was selected for Australian production of Billy Elliot the Musical, written by Lee Hall, directed by Stephen Daldry with music by Sir. Elton John. She played Mrs Wilkinson from 2007 to 2009, received positive reviews by critics and winning the Sydney Theatre Awards, the Green Room Awards, and the Helpmann Award for her performance. From 2010 and 2011 Lemon was cast for the fifth anniversary United Kingdom tour of the musical's debut.

In 2012 Lemon plays in Death of a Salesman musical by Trevor Ashley, and The Mousetrap by Gary Young. In 2013 Lemon came back to television acting as Bunny in Jane Campion's mini-series Top of the Lake, winning the Equity Ensemble as a cast member. The same year she act in The Pirates of Penzance by Dean Bryant at the Hamer Hall in Melbourne.

In 2014 Lemon played Dotty Otley in Jonathan Biggins's Noises Off production at the Sydney Opera House, She was also cast for season three of television series Rake, and Australian mini-series The Secret River. In 2015 she was cast with Kate Winslet, Judy Davis and Liam Hemsworth in critical acclaimed The Dressmaker directed by Jocelyn Moorhouse. The next two years Lemon worked with Belvoir St Theatre Company and Sydney Theatre Company.

In 2017 she played in The Homosexuals, or “Faggots” by Lee Lewis, Who's Afraid of Virginia Woolf? by Iain Sinclair, and Melba by Wayne Harrison and Michael Tyack. The next year Lemon played as Mrs. Wentworth in Bruce Beresford's film Ladies in Black, and had a recurring role in television series Home and Away.

In 2019 Lemon starred in Thomas M. Wright's film Acute Misfortune. The same year she played Sister Winnie in Terence O'Donnell's musical Folk.

In 2020 was announced the participation of Lemon, Benedict Cumberbatch, Kirsten Dunst and Jesse Plemons in Jane Campion's project The Power of the Dog. The cast performance was critically acclaimed, receiving positive reviews and numerous nominations in several film awards, including Academy Award, Golden Globe and BEFFTA Awards Lemon won her first Satellite Award and received a Critics' Choice Awards nomination as a member of the cast.

In 2021 Lemon starred in the recurring role of Fiona Palmer in the Australian television series Eden and as in the critical acclaim series The Tourist. In November 2021 the film Here Out West was presented at the Sydney Film Festival, in which Lemon starred as Nancy. From March to April 2022, Lemon starred as Mrs Thornhill in the theatrical adaptation of North by Northwest at the Sydney Lyric Theatre.

In 2024, Lemon was named as part of the cast for Stan series Population 11.

In 2025, Lemon starred in theatre production How To Plot A Hit in Two Days.

== Filmography ==
=== Film ===
Year	Title	Role	Notes
1989	Luigi's Ladies	Debbo	Feature film
1989	Sweetie	Dawn 'Sweetie'	Feature film
1993	The Piano	Nessie	Feature film
1995	Billy's Holiday	Julie	Feature film
1997	The Well	Jen Bordern	Feature film
1999	Holy Smoke!	Rahi	Feature film
1999	Soft Fruit	Josie	Feature film
2006	Suburban Mayhem	Auntie Dianne	Feature film
2007	To Each His Own Cinema	The Voices #1	French anthology film; segment: "The Lady Bug"
2008	8	Pam Garner	Anthology film; segment: "The Water Diary"
2015	The Dressmaker	Mae McSwiney	Feature film
2018	Ladies in Black	Mrs. Wentworth	Feature film
2019	Acute Misfortune	Carmel Cullen	Feature film
2021	The Power of the Dog	Mrs. Lewis	Feature film
2022	Here Out West	Nancy	Anthology film
2022	Christmas Ransom	Nan	Feature film
2022	Ticket to Paradise	Beth-Ann	Feature film
2023	The Appleton Ladies' Potato Race	Barb Brickner	TV movie
2024	Runt	Dolly Shearer	

=== Television ===
Year	Title	Role	Notes	Ref
1982	Sons and Daughters	Jennifer Hickson	Season 1, episode 136	
1983	The Young Doctors	Zelda Baker	Season 8	
1984–1985	Prisoner (aka Prisoner: Cell Block H)	Marlene Warren	Seasons 6–7, 74 episodes	
1986	Studio 86		Anthology series, episode: "Ladies' Day"	
1989	The Flying Doctors	Libby	Season 5, episode 24: "A Rhyme for Reason"	
1990	G.P.	Kate Mawson	Season 2, episode 37: "Longing"	
1991–1992	Neighbours	Brenda Riley	Seasons 7–8, 41 episodes	
1993	Seven Deadly Sins	Envy	Miniseries	
1994	Heartland	Fiona Lovell	Season 1, episode 8	
1996	After the Beep	Josephine Donnelly	Season 1, 7 episodes	
2001	Always Greener	Loretta	Season 1, episode 3: "Close Encounters of the Furred Kind"	
2003	The Postcard Bandit	Nola	TV movie	
2003	Mermaids	Betty	TV movie	
2008	The Adventures of Charlotte and Henry	Charlotte's Mum / Henry's Mum / Madame	Animation	
2013	Top of the Lake	Bunny	Miniseries, 7 episodes	
2014	Rake	Tikki Wendon	Season 3, 6 episodes	
2015	The Secret River	Mrs. Herring	Miniseries	
2015	Redfern Now: Promise Me	Dr. Linda	TV movie (conclusion of Redfern Now)	
2018	Home and Away	Hazel Easton	Season 31, 10 episodes	
2021	The Tourist	Sue	Season 1, 6 episodes	
2021	Eden	Fiona Palmer	Season 1, 3 episodes	
2022	Pieces of Her	Gloria	Season 1, 1 episode	
2022	Colin From Accounts	Jenny	1 episode	
2023	Totally, Completely, Fine	Lorraine Matthews	2 episodes	
2023	Strife	Anne Marie Ford	1 episode	
2024	Population 11	Valerie Hogarth	9 episodes	
2024	Return To Paradise	Madge Woodburne		

== Radio ==
Year	Program	Role	Station
1989	Bastille Day Show	Comedy sketch with Andrew Denton and Simon Dodd	ABC Radio - Australia
1995	The Tatty Hallow Story	Recurring guest host	ABC Radio - Australia
1999	Hinx Minx	Co-host	ABC Radio - Australia

== Theatre ==
Title	Years	Role	Location / company
1986	The Madras House	Mrs Brigstock	Wharf Theatre, Sydney with STC
1986	The Seagull	Masha	Wharf Theatre, Sydney with STC
1989	Summer Rain	Lorna Farrell	Roslyn Packer Theatre, Sydney with STC
1990	Once in a Lifetime	Helen Hobart	Wharf Theatre, Sydney with STC
1992	The Girl Who Saw Everything	Carol	Wharf Theatre, Sydney with STC
1996	Miracle City	Lora Lee Truswell	Wharf Theatre, Sydney with STC
1996	Summer of the Seventeenth Doll	Olive	Arts Centre Melbourne with MTC
1996	Merrily We Roll Along	Gussie	Footbridge Theatre, Sydney with STC
1999	The Recruit	Meg	Wharf Theatre, Sydney with STC
2000	Piaf	Toine	Southbank Theatre, Melbourne with MTC
2001	The Olympic Revue	Various characters	Wharf Theatre, Sydney with STC
2001	Morning Sacrifice	Miss Bates	Wharf Theatre, Sydney with STC
2001	My Brilliant Divorce	Miss Bates	Australian national tour with STC
2002	Hanging Man	Linda	Wharf Theatre, Sydney with STC
2002	The Cosmonaut's Last Message	Vivienne / Sylvia	Belvoir St Theatre, Sydney
2003	Broken Glass	Harriet	Ensemble Theatre, Sydney
2004	Victory	Pyle	Wharf Theatre, Sydney with STC
2004	The Republic of Myopia	Envoy of the USA	Roslyn Packer Theatre, Sydney
2004	Harbour	Jo	Roslyn Packer Theatre, Sydney
2004–2006	Wharf Revue	Various characters	Wharf Theatre, Sydney, Roslyn Packer Theatre, Sydney, Sydney Opera House with STC
2005	Summer Rain	Ruby Slocum	Roslyn Packer Theatre, Sydney with STC
2006–2008	Priscilla, Queen of the Desert	Shirley	Lyric Theatre, Sydney, Regent Theatre, Melbourne, Star City, Sydney, Auckland Civic Theatre
2007–2009; 2010–2011	Billy Elliot the Musical	Mrs Wilkinson	Capitol Theatre, Sydney, Her Majesty's Theatre, Melbourne, Victoria Palace Theatre, London
2012	Death of a Salesman	Linda / Letta	Belvoir St Theatre, Sydney
2012	The Mousetrap	Mrs Boyle	Hamer Hall, Melbourne with Mousetrap Australia Company
2013	The Pirates of Penzance	Ruth	Arts Centre Melbourne with The Production Company
2015	Noises Off	Dotty Otley	Sydney Opera House with STC
2015	Seventeen	Lizzie	Belvoir St Theatre, Sydney
2016	Hay Fever	Clara	Wharf Theatre, Sydney with STC
2016	The Hanging	Ms Corrossi	Wharf Theatre, Sydney with STC
2016	The Blind Giant is Dancing	Eileen	Belvoir St Theatre, Sydney
2017	Who's Afraid of Virginia Woolf?	Martha	Ensemble Theatre, Sydney
2017	The Homosexuals, or “Faggots”	Diana	Malthouse Theatre, Melbourne with Griffin Theatre Company
2017	Melba	Madame Marchesi	Hayes Theatre, Sydney
2019	Folk	Sister Winnie	Ensemble Theatre, Sydney
2022	North by Northwest	Mrs Thornhill	Sydney Lyric Theatre
2025	How To Plot A Hit In Two Days	Dell	Ensemble Theatre
2025	Cabaret		Teatro
2026	Cluedo		Playhouse QPac

== Awards and nominations ==
Year	Work	Association	Category	Result
1982	Steaming	Green Room Awards	Best Actress in a Supporting Role	Nominated
1985	Prisoner	Penguin Awards	Certificate of Commendation	Won
1989	Sweetie	AACTA Awards	Best Lead Actress	Nominated
1990	Sweetie	AFCA Awards	Best Actress	Won
2006	Suburban Mayhem	AACTA Awards	Best Supporting Actress	Nominated
2007	Billy Elliot the Musical	Sydney Theatre Awards	Best Actress in a Musical	Won
2008	Billy Elliot the Musical	Helpmann Awards	Best Actress in a Musical	Won
2008	Billy Elliot the Musical	Green Room Awards	Best Actress in a Leading Role	Won
2014	Top of the Lake	Equity Ensemble Awards	Outstanding Performance by an Ensemble in a Miniseries	Won
2015	The Dressmaker	Women Film Critics Circle	Best Ensemble	Nominated
2021	The Power of the Dog	Critics' Choice Awards	Best Acting Ensemble	Nominated
2021	The Power of the Dog	New York Film Critics Online	Best Ensemble	Won
2021	The Power of the Dog	Satellite Awards	Best Ensemble – Motion Picture	Won
2021	The Power of the Dog	Washington D.C. Area Film Critics Association	Best Ensemble	Nominated
