= Jonathan Biggins =

Australian actor, singer, writer and comedian

Jonathan Biggins OAM
- Born: Jonathan Martin Biggins; Newcastle, Australia
- Education: Newcastle Boys High School; University of Newcastle
- Occupations: Actor; writer; singer; director; comedian
- Spouse(s): Kathleen Kerr 1989-1996; Elaine Smith
- Children: 2

Jonathan Martin Biggins is an Australian actor, singer, writer, director, and comedian. He has appeared on film, stage and television as well as in satirical sketch comedy television programmes.

== Early life and education ==
Jonathan Martin Biggins was born in Newcastle, New South Wales, and attended Newcastle Boys' High School in the mid-1970s. He said that it was "a fairly intimidating place to be if you weren't great at sports or maths. However once [I] joined the debating team, and went on to win the state finals, things started looking up."

== Career ==
=== Film ===
Biggins' film appearances include Thank God He Met Lizzie, Gettin' Square and A Few Best Men.

=== Television ===
His television appearances include The Dingo Principle and Three Men and a Baby Grand, satirical sketch television comedy programmes (for which he was a writer/performer with Phillip Scott and Drew Forsythe).

Jonathan has been seen on TV as a recurring guest panellist on Spicks and Specks.

=== Hosting ===
Biggins has hosted the afternoon radio shift for Sydney's 702.

He presented the art panel programme Critical Mass. He hosted the New Year's Eve Gala Concert in 2010 at the Sydney Opera House, and An Audience with Stephen Sondheim (nominated for a 2008 Helpmann Award for Best Special event).

He has hosted the AFI Awards, APRA Awards, Helpmann Awards, Parramatta Riverside's 20th Anniversary Gala, national and international conferences for AMP. He has also made appearances for KPMG, ICI, Commonwealth Bank, ABN-AMRO and the Art Gallery of NSW.

=== Stage ===
Biggins' has performed in numerous stage productions, as actor, singer, comedian and MC.

Theatre credits include The Importance of Being Earnest (as John Worthing, replacing Geoffrey Rush), A Funny Thing Happened on the Way to the Forum and Orpheus in the Underworld. He starred as Peter Sellers in Ying Tong, a play about Spike Milligan and The Goons, which was an Australian-wide hit. He has appeared on stage consistently over the years with the Wharf Revue.

He also performed in the Gilbert and Sullivan operas Ruddigore and The Mikado.

=== Writing/directing ===
Biggins has directed the Wharf Revue since 2000. In 2004 Jonathan co-wrote and directed The Republic of Myopia for Sydney Theatre Company. He directed the Australian production of Avenue Q (2009–10). He also co-wrote, with Phillip Scott, some of the dialogue for The Man from Snowy River: Arena Spectacular, a stage musical based on the poem "The Man from Snowy River".

He has written for the Sydney Morning Herald weekly magazine Good Weekend, Australian Wine Selector and is the author of four books, including The 700 Habits of Highly Ineffective People.

== Filmography ==
=== Film ===
| Year | Title | Role | Type |
|---|---|---|---|
| 1987 | Those Dear Departed | Sergeant Steve | Feature film |
| 1987 | I've Come About the Suicide | Bell-hop | TV movie |
| 1988 | The Clean Machine | Bank Clerk | TV movie |
| 1991 | The Private War of Lucinda Smith | Private Murry | TV movie |
| 1992 | The Importance of Being Earnest | John Worthing | TV movie |
| 1996 | The Munsters' Scary Little Christmas | Spooky Onlooker #2 | TV movie |
| 1997 | Thank God He Met Lizzie | Darren | Feature film |
| 2003 | Gettin' Square | Richard Dent QC | Feature film |
| 2010 | Odd Socks | Narrator | Short film |
| 2011 | The White Guard | The Hetman | Feature film |
| 2011 | A Few Best Men | Jim Ramme | Feature film |
| 2015 | Manny Lewis | Ray McKee | Feature film |

=== Television ===
| Year | Title | Role | Type |
|---|---|---|---|
| 1985 | Green Hill | | TV children's series |
| 1986 | The Lancaster Miller Affair | Hardcastle | TV miniseries, 3 episodes |
| 1986-87 | A Country Practice | Graham Biggs | TV series, 8 episodes |
| 1987 | The Mike Walsh Show | | TV variety series |
| 1987 | Pigs Will Fly | | |
| 1987 | Rafferty's Rules | Angus MacLean | TV series, 1 episode |
| 1987 | The Dingo Principle | Various characters | TV sketch series (also writer) |
| 1989 | Swap Shop | | TV children's series |
| 1989 | Bangkok Hilton | O'Keefe | TV miniseries, 1 episode |
| 1989-90 | The Monkey or the Gun | | |
| 1990 | The Party Machine | Various characters | TV series, 3 episodes (also writer) |
| 1993 | Review | Reporter / Presenter | TV series |
| 1993-95 | World Series Debating | Self | TV series, 2 episodes |
| 1990–92; 1995 | The Investigators | | TV series |
| 1994 | Three Men and a Baby Grand | Various characters | TV sketch series, 10 episodes (also writer) |
| 1996-97 | Good News Week | Guest | TV series, 2 episodes |
| 1997 | Fallen Angels | Barrister | TV episode |
| 1999 | Noah's Ark | First Priest | TV miniseries |
| 1999-2000 | AFI Awards | Host | TV special |
| 2001 | Flat Chat | Duncan | TV series, 1 episode |
| 2003-04 | Critical Mass | Host | TV series |
| 2005-08 | Spicks and Specks | Guest panellist | TV series, 4 episodes |
| 2007 | City Homicide | James Bradwell | TV series, 1 episode |
| 2009 | My Place | Race Caller | TV series |
| 2010 | Rake | Martin | TV series, season 1, episode 6 |
| 2010 | New Year's Eve Gala Concert at the Sydney Opera House | Host | TV special |
| 2011 | The Jesters | Rupert Baxter | TV series, season 2, 1 episode |
| 2011 | At Home with Julia | Paul Keating / Tony Jones | TV series, 3 episodes |
| 2012 | Randling | Self | TV series, 5 episodes |
| 2017 | Drop Dead Weird | Harry Styles | TV series, 1 episode |
| 2020 | Back to the Rafters | Charles Whiteman | TV series |
| 2023 | The Messenger | Father Terence O'Reilly | TV miniseries, 5 episodes |

== Theatre ==
| Year | Title | Role | Company / Venue |
|---|---|---|---|
| 1969 | Twelfth Night | | Hunter Valley Theatre Co |
| 1974 | Quality Street | | Young Peoples' Theatre, Hamilton |
| 1974 | The Beggar's Opera | | Newcastle |
| 1976 | Equus | | Griffith Duncan Theatre for Hunter Valley Theatre Co |
| 1979 | Flexitime | | Newcastle for Hunter Valley Theatre Co |
| 1980 | A Toast to Melba | | University of Newcastle |
| 1980 | The Star Show: Tonite Heroes, Tomorrow Forgotten | | Civic Playhouse, Newcastle for Hunter Valley Theatre Co |
| 1980 | The Threepenny Opera | | Hunter Valley Theatre Co |
| 1981 | Treasure Island | | Fort Scratchley, Newcastle for Hunter Valley Theatre Co |
| 1981 | A Funny Thing Happened on the Way to the Forum | | Newcastle Civic Theatre for Hunter Valley Theatre Co |
| 1981 | No Names ... No Pack Drill | | Playhouse, Newcastle for Hunter Valley Theatre Co |
| 1981 | Hay Fever | | Playhouse, Newcastle for Hunter Valley Theatre Co |
| 1981 | The Playboy of the Western World | | Playhouse, Newcastle & Seymour Centre for Hunter Valley Theatre Co |
| 1981 | Habeas Corpus | | Playhouse, Newcastle for Hunter Valley Theatre Co |
| 1981 | Essington Lewis: I Am Work | | Civic Playhouse, Newcastle for Hunter Valley Theatre Co |
| 1981 | Hamlet on Ice | | Fanny's Theatre Restaurant, Newcastle for Hunter Valley Theatre Co |
| 1982 | Tom Sawyer | | Hunter Valley Theatre Co |
| 1982 | West Side Story | | Hunter Valley Theatre Co |
| 1982 | Big River | | Singleton & Playhouse, Newcastle for Hunter Valley Theatre Co |
| 1982 | Macbeth | | Hunter Valley Theatre Co |
| 1982 | Forget-Me-Not Lane | | Playhouse, Newcastle |
| 1982 | The Man from Mukinupin | | Playhouse, Newcastle for Hunter Valley Theatre Co |
| 1982 | Rookery Nook | | Playhouse, Newcastle for Hunter Valley Theatre Co |
| 1982 | The Venetian Twins | | Playhouse Theatre Co, Newcastle |
| 1983 | In the Field Where They Buried Peter Pan | | Playhouse Theatre Co, Newcastle |
| 1983 | Monstersplash | Captain | Inner City Theatre Co |
| 1983 | It's My Party! | Neil | Inner City Theatre Co |
| 1984 | Oz Duz NZ! - Bert and Maisy | Tom | Stables Theatre |
| 1985 | A Bed of Roses | | Stables Theatre |
| 1985 | Private Lives | Victor | Playhouse, Newcastle for Hunter Valley Theatre Co |
| 1985 | Tommy | Various characters | Newcastle Panthers for Hunter Valley Theatre Co |
| 1985 | Blithe Spirit | | Civic Playhouse, Newcastle |
| 1985-86 | Essington Lewis: I Am Work | Various characters | Stables Theatre & Playhouse, Adelaide for STCSA |
| 1986 | Pearls Before Swine | Cubby Maisonette | Belvoir St Theatre, Seymour Centre & Universal Theatre |
| 1986 | The Last Wake at She-Oak Creek | Youmg Chookie Greene / Jack | Stables Theatre for Griffin Theatre Company |
| 1986 | Tarantara | Various characters | Q Theatre Co |
| 1988 | Manning Clark's History of Australia: The Musical | Various characters | Princess Theatre (Melbourne) |
| 1988-89 | Living in the Seventies | | Seymour Centre & Studio Theatre, Melbourne |
| 1989 | Summer Rain | Clarrie | Sydney Opera House for Sydney Theatre Company |
| 1990 | The Venetian Twins | Lelio | Queensland Theatre Company, University of Sydney & Playhouse, Melbourne |
| 1991 | Three Men and a Baby Grand | | Tilbury Hotel, Playhouse Newcastle, Fairfax Studio & Edinburgh Fringe Festival (also writer) |
| 1992 | The Importance of Being Earnest | John Worthing | Theatre Royal, Sydney & Melbourne Theatre Company |
| 1992 | The Barber of Seville | Figaro | Marian Street Theatre |
| 1993 | Three Men and a Baby Grand | | Space Cabaret, Adelaide |
| 1993 | Three Men and a Baby Grand Too | | Tilbury Hotel, Woolloomooloo |
| 1993 | Comedy Festival Debate: Television is Bad for You | | Melbourne Athenaeum |
| 1993 | Abbie and Lou, Norman and Rose | Norman | Playhouse, Newcastle for Hunter Valley Theatre Co |
| 1994 | A Midsummer Night's Dream | Bottom | Playhouse, Newcastle for Hunter Valley Theatre Co |
| 1995 | It's My Party (and I'll Die If I Want To) | Undertaker | Glen Street Theatre for Malcom Cooke & Associates |
| 1995 | How the Other Half Loves | William Featherstone | Marian Street Theatre |
| 1995 | Ruddigore | Robin Oakapple | Victorian State Opera at State Theatre, Melbourne |
| 1996 | Quartermaine's Terms | Derek Meadle | Marian Street Theatre |
| 1996 | Tilbury Hotel 10th Anniversary Gala | | Tilbury Hotel |
| 1997-98 | Essington Lewis: I Am Work | Various characters | Newcastle Civic Theatre & Belvoir Street Theatre |
| 1997-98 | Abroad with Two Men | | CDP Australian tour |
| 1998-99 | A Funny Thing Happened on the Way to the Forum | Hysterium | Essgee Productions Australian tour |
| 1999 | The Mikado | Koko | Festival Theatre, Adelaide |
| 2000 | The Unofficial Visitors Guide to Australia | | Wharf Revue for Wharf 2 Theatre |
| 2000 | The End of the Wharf As We Know It | | Wharf Revue for Sydney Theatre Company |
| 2000 | Sunday in Iraq with George: A Shock 'n' Awe-full Show | | Wharf Revue at Wharf 2 Theatre |
| 2001 | The Best Bits of That Broad and Those Men | | Glen Street Theatre |
| 2001 | Free Petrol! | | Wharf Revue at Wharf 2 Theatre for Sydney Theatre Company |
| 2001 | Free Petrol Too! | | Wharf Revue at Wharf 2 Theatre for Sydney Theatre Company |
| 2002 | Soulmates | Greg | Australian tour |
| 2002 | Much Revue About Nothing | | Wharf Revue for Wharf 2 Theatre |
| 2003 | Sunday in Iraq with George | | Wharf Revue for Sydney Theatre Company |
| 2003 | Orpheus in the Underworld | John Styx (Singer) | Opera Australia at State Theatre, Melbourne & Sydney Opera House |
| 2004 | The Mikado | Koko | State Opera of South Australia, Opera Queensland & Sydney Opera House |
| 2004 | Fast and Loose | | Wharf Revue at Glen Street Theatre for Sydney Theatre Company |
| 2005 | Concert for Tax Relief | | Wharf Revue at Wharf 2 Theatre |
| 2005 | Die Fledermaus | Frosch | Opera Australia |
| 2005 | Stuff All Happens | | Wharf Revue Australian tour |
| 2006 | Best We Forget | | Wharf Revue at Wharf 2 Theatre for Sydney Theatre Company |
| 2006 | Revue Sans Frontieres | Paul Keating & various characters | The Wharf Revue at Lennox Theatre, Parramatta, Wharf 2 Theatre & Adelaide Cabaret Festival |
| 2007 | An Audience with Stephen Sondheim | Host/MC | Theatre Royal, Sydney |
| 2007-08 | Ying Tong: A Walk With the Goons | Peter Sellers | Sydney Theatre Company Australian tour |
| 2008 | Futures Summit | | Bell Shakespeare Company |
| 2007-08 | Beware of the Dogma | Paul Keating | The Wharf Revue Australian tour |
| 2008 | Waiting for Garnaut | | Wharf Revue at Wharf 1 Theatre, Casula Powerhouse for Sydney Theatre Company |
| 2009 | Travesties | Henry Carr | Sydney Opera House |
| 2009 | Christmas at the House | Host/MC | Sydney Opera House for Opera Australia |
| 2009-10 | Pennies from Kevin | Paul Keating / Gough Whitlam / Pope Ratzinger | The Wharf Revue Australian tour |
| 2010 | APRA Awards | Host | XYZ Networks |
| 2010 | Not Quite Out of the Woods | Tony Jones / Bob Brown | Wharf Revue Sydney Theatre Company Australian tour |
| 2011 | The White Guard | Herman / Cobbler | Sydney Theatre |
| 2011 | Debt Defying Acts | Lord Mayor Clover Moore & various characters | Wharf Revue Australian tour |
| 2011–13, 2015-16 | New Years' Eve Gala Concert | Host | Opera Australia |
| 2013 | Whoops! | Sir Petulant Pyne | Wharf Revue Australian tour |
| 2014 | The Happy Ending (Workshop) | | Opera Australia |
| 2014 | Helpmann Awards | Co-host | |
| 2014 | Open for Business | Paul Keating | Wharf Revue Australian tour |
| 2015 | Premier's Senior Week Gala Concert | | Venables Creating Entertainment |
| 2015 | Celebrating 15 Years | | Wharf Revue Australian tour |
| 2016 | Back to Bite You | Tony Abbott (Antonius Abbottus) / Donald Trump / Mathias Cormann | Wharf Revue at Wharf 1 Theatre for Sydney Theatre Company |
| 2016-20 | Great Opera Hits | Host | Opera Australia |
| 2017 | The Patriotic Rag | Donald Trump | Wharf Revue at The Playhouse, Canberra for Sydney Theatre Company |
| 2018 | The Wharf Revue 2018 | | Wharf Revue Australian tour |
| 2019-20 | No Cabaret for Old Men | | Seymour Centre for Sydney International Cabaret Festival & Riverside Theatres Parramatta |
| 2019 | Krapp’s Last Tape | Krapp | Old Fitzroy Theatre for Red Line Productions |
| 2020 | Celebrating 15 Years | | Wharf Revue Online - Australia |
| 2020 | Good Night and Good Luck | Coronavirus | Wharf Revue for Sydney Theatre Company |
| 2020-21 | Keating: The Gospel According to Paul | Paul Keating | Sir Robert Helpmann Theatre, Dunstan Playhouse, Adelaide, Majestic Cinemas, NSW & Riverside Theatres Parramatta for Soft Tread Enterprises |
| 2022 | Can of Worms | Donald Trump / Mark Latham | Wharf Revue for Sydney Theatre Company Australian tour |
| 2022 | Looking for Albanese | Jim Chalmers / The Grim Reaper / Clive Palmer / King Charles III / Paul Keating | Wharf Revue at Seymour Centre |
| 2023 | Pride in Prejudice | | Wharf Revue at Seymour Centre |

== Awards and nominations ==
| Year | Nominated work | Award | Category | Result |
|---|---|---|---|---|
| 2000 | Jonathan Biggins | Mo Awards | Male Comedy Performer of the Year | Won |
| 2010 | Avenue Q | Helpmann Award | Best Direction of a Musical | Won |
| 2021 | Jonathan Biggins | Medal of the Order of Australia in the 2021 Queen's Birthday Honours | Service to the performing arts through theatre | Won |

== Personal life ==
He is married to Australian actress Elaine Smith, best known as Daphne Clarke in the soap opera Neighbours. He and Smith have twin daughters born in February 2000.
