= Safety in Numbers =

Safety in Numbers may refer to:

- Safety in numbers, a group protection theory

== Music ==
- Safety in Numbers (Crack the Sky album) (1978)
- Safety in Numbers (David Van Tieghem album) (1987)
- Safety in Numbers (Margaret Urlich album) (1989)
- Brand New / Safety in Numbers, Brand New album (2002)
- Safety in Numbers (Umphrey's McGee album) (2006)
- "Safety in Numbers", a song by Sadus from Elements of Anger (1997)
- Safety in Numbers (musical), a 1982 Australian musical by Phillip Scott and Luke Hardy

== Film ==
- Safety in Numbers (1930 film)
- Safety in Numbers (1938 film)

== Television ==
- Episode 3 of the Fox television drama, Touch (2012 TV series)
