= It's My Party (disambiguation) =

"It's My Party" is a 1963 single recorded by American singer Lesley Gore.

It's My Party may also refer to:

- "It's My Party" (Jessie J song), a 2013 single
- It's My Party (album), a 2026 album by Meg Mac
- It's My Party (film), a 1996 film
- It's My Party!, an American girl group
- "It's My Party", a song by Bret Michaels from his album Songs of Life
- It's My Party (tour), a 2019 concert tour by Jennifer Lopez
