= The Republic of Myopia =

- Music: Phillip Scott
- Lyrics: Jonathan Biggins, Drew Forsythe and Phillip Scott
- Book: Jonathan Biggins, Drew Forsythe and Phillip Scott
- Productions: 2004 Sydney

The Republic of Myopia is an Australian musical with book and lyrics by Jonathan Biggins, Drew Forsythe and Phillip Scott and music by Phillip Scott.

The comedic musical is set in 1904 in the fictional central European republic of Myopia. The Myopians are an old-fashioned, peaceful and happy people ruled by a benevolent President, until an American envoy visits to make things 'better'.

Sydney Theatre Company premiered the musical to open the Sydney Theatre, performed in repertory with Katherine Thomson's play Harbour (which shared the same cast). It was directed by Biggins with choreography by Ross Coleman.

An original cast recording was released.

== Cast ==
- Peter Carroll
- Tamsin Carroll
- Simon Gleeson
- Drew Forsythe
- Mitchell Butel
- Genevieve Lemon
- Helen Dallimore
- William Zappa
- Melissa Jaffer
- Christopher Pitman

== Awards ==
The production received three nominations at the 2004 Helpmann Awards, for Best Music Direction (Phillip Scott), Best Male Actor in a Musical (Peter Carroll) and Best Male Actor in a Supporting Role in a Musical (Mitchell Butel).

The musical received the AWGIE Award for Music Theatre in 2005.
