= Wharf Revue =

Australian theatre performance

The Wharf Revue was a series of musical comedy revues presented by the Sydney Theatre Company. Each show features four comedians – usually Jonathan Biggins, Phillip Scott and Drew Forsythe, accompanied by a female performer – satirising media personalities and political events in sketches and songs. Female Wharf Revue performers have included Amanda Bishop, Genevieve Lemon, Jacki Weaver and Helen Dallimore (filling in), with Amanda Bishop having been the regular performer since 2017.

The revue has become something of a Sydney cultural institution.

== Past shows ==
- November–December 2024, March-April 2025: The End of the Wharf As We Know It
- 2023: Pride in Prejudice
- 2022: Looking for Albanese
- 2021: Can of Worms
- 2020: Good Night and Good Luck
- Oct to Dec 2019: Unr-Dact-D
- Oct to Dec 2018: Deja Revue
- Oct to Dec 2017: The Patriotic Rag
- Dec 2016: Back with a Bite
- Dec 2015: Celebrating 15 years
- Dec 2014: Open for Business
- Dec 2013: Whoops!
- Dec 2012: Red Wharf: Beyond the Rings of Satire
- Dec 2011: Debt Defying Acts
- Dec 2010: Not Quite out of the Woods
- Dec 2009: Pennies from Kevin
- Dec 2008: Waiting for Garnaut
- 2007: Beware of the Dogma
- 8 November – 9 December 2006: Revue Sans Frontières
- 2006: Revue Sans Frontieres
- 17 July – 15 August 2006: Best We Forget
- 16 November – 23 December 2005: Stuff All Happens
- 5–30 April 2005: Concert for Tax Relief
- 2004: Fast and Loose
- June 2003: Sunday in Iraq with George
- 2002: Much Revue About Nothing
- 2001: Free Petrol!
- 2000: The End of the Wharf As We Know It
- 2000: The Unofficial Visitors Guide to Australia

== See also ==
- Culture of Sydney
