= The Dingo Principle =

- Genre: Sketch comedy
- Created by: Patrick Cook and Phillip Scott
- Directed by: Ted Robinson
- Starring: Jonathan Biggins; Patrick Cook; Drew Forsythe; Geoff Kelso; Antonia Murphy; Phillip Scott; Deni Gordon
- Country of origin: Australia
- Original language: English
- No. of series: 1
- No. of episodes: 10

Original release
- Network: ABC Television
- Release: 6 April – 8 June 1987

Related
- The Gillies Report

The Dingo Principle is an Australian satirical comedy series created by Patrick Cook and Phillip Scott which was produced and broadcast by the Australian Broadcasting Corporation (ABC) in 1987.

== Cast ==
- Jonathan Biggins
- Patrick Cook
- Drew Forsythe
- Geoff Kelso
- Antonia Murphy
- Phillip Scott
- Deni Gordon

== Production ==
Only ten episodes were made and shown in a late night time-slot. Cook, Scott, and Kelso had also written and performed in an earlier satirical program, The Gillies Report, but Cook stressed that the only similarities between the shows was that they "were both about current affairs and were both on the ABC". The program was recorded in front of a live audience on Saturday nights, and broadcast on Monday nights.

== Controversy ==
The program is remembered for causing several diplomatic incidents. On 20 April 1987, the program performed a mock interview with the Ayatollah Khomeini, resulting in two Australian diplomats being expelled from Tehran and threats of trade sanctions from Iran. Two weeks later, when the program lampooned Mikhail Gorbachev and Vladimir Lenin, the press attaché of the Soviet Embassy in Canberra wrote a letter of rebuke to the managing director of the ABC, David Hill:

It is tragic that such irresponsible slander of the Soviet policy, history, culture and traditions can be broadcast under the pretext of the freedom of the press. ... Camouflaged as a 'satirical skit', this program in very poor taste ridiculed contemporary Soviet leaders and even lampooned the founder of the Soviet state, Vladimir Lenin, whose name is cherished by millions of people all over the world, including Australia.

— Nicolas Fomin, Letter to ABC Managing Director, David Hill

The letter also hinted that the ABC's proposed Moscow bureau could be jeopardised by the sketch.

The incidents were raised in the Parliament of Australia on 11 May 1987, when National Party MP John Sharp questioned the Minister for Communications Michael Duffy about the effect of the show on Australia's economy and trade relationships. Duffy stressed the independence of the ABC, and stated it would be inappropriate for him, his department, or the Australian government to intervene in ABC programming decisions.
