= Glen Street Theatre =

- Interactive map of the Glen Street Theatre area
- Former names: Forest Community Centre

General information
- Location: Belrose, New South Wales
- Coordinates: 33.74023°S 151.21031°E
- Opened: 6 July 1985
- Renovated: 2013–15
- Client: Warringah Shire Council
- Owner: Northern Beaches Council

Design and construction
- Architecture firm: Sawdy and Black
- Main contractor: Amacon Pty. Ltd.

Renovating team
- Renovating firm: Mark Hurcum Design Practice

Other information
- Seating capacity: 400

Website
- http://www.glenstreet.com.au/

Glen Street Theatre is a 400-seat proscenium arch auditorium located in the Forest Community Centre, at the corner of Glen Street and Blackbutts Road in Belrose in the northern suburbs of Sydney, New South Wales, Australia. It was opened as Stage 2 of the Forest Community Centre on 6 July 1985 by Warringah Shire President Darren Jones, and is owned by the Northern Beaches Council.

== Performances ==
The theatre regularly presents productions from many of Australia's performing arts companies including Sydney Theatre Company, Ensemble Theatre, Belvoir, Bell Shakespeare, Griffin Theatre Company, Queensland Theatre Company, Melbourne's Playbox Theatre, Perth Theatre Company, the State Theatre Company of South Australia and other independent production companies, including Circus Oz, Pork Chop Productions, Performing Lines and Hit Productions. Actors appearing on stage included: Jonathan Biggins, Max Cullen, Drew Forsythe, John Gaden, Belinda Giblin, Max Gillies, Maggie Kirkpatrick, Genevieve Lemon, Pia Miranda, Jeremy Sims, Barry Otto and Jacki Weaver.

The Glen Street Theatre also supports local productions and arts with Davidson High School staging its annual Season Of Performing Arts at the theatre. The North Sydney Dance Festival is also staged from the theatre.

== History ==
The need for the Forest Community Centre, incorporating a theatre, grew out of the 1970s population growth in the Forest District, and was championed by The Forest Community Association and Warringah C Ward Councillor and later mayor, Julie Sutton. These efforts culminated in the 1976 approval by Warringah Shire Council of a two-stage concept for the centre designed by architects Sawdy and Black. Stage 1, opened and leased in 1979, consisted of the Forest Squash Centre and Stage 2, comprising the Glen Street Theatre, was officially opened by Shire President Darren Jones in 1985. Warringah Shire, which contributed $1,830,000 towards its construction, became the majority owner/shareholder. Originally a for-hire amateur production theatre, the first professional Glen Street Theatre subscription season was launched in 1994.

On 27 February 2013 Warringah Mayor Michael Regan commissioned, with council approval, a $7 million two-stage masterplan for the theatre and community centre precinct, noting: "Glen Street is the grande dame of Sydney’s suburban theatres but, after 27 years, she’s in need of an overhaul". Stage 1 entailed Glen Street Theatre Foyer upgrade and landscaping ($1.8 million), which were completed in early 2015. Stage 2, which entails moving Belrose Branch Library (opened 1979) to the Glen Street frontage, a new café and offices ($5.5 million), was completed in mid-2017. The new Glen Street Library was opened on 2 June 2017 by Northern Beaches Council Administrator Dick Persson and former Warringah Mayor Michael Regan.
