= Deni Gordon =

Australian actress

Deni Gordon is an American-born Australian actress and performer. Originally from Boston, Massachusetts, Gordon is the daughter of African-American parents and moved to Australia in 1969 to star in the musical Hair with longtime friend and fellow cast member Marcia Hines. She appeared as a singer and dancer in the ABC sketch comedy series The Dingo Principle and had a guest role in the soap opera Sons and Daughters in 1987. She had a regular role in the fourth and fifth season of Heartbreak High, as teacher Ronnie Brooks, and has appeared as a Priestess in both the film The Matrix and the Farscape episode "Jeremiah Crichton" in 1999.

Gordon is the voice behind the "r-r-r-r-rage!" scream heard in the opening titles and breakers of the long-running ABC music video program Rage.

Gordon was interviewed by ABC Radio National in 2017 about her career.

== Filmography ==
=== Film ===
Year	Title	Role	Type
1983	At Last... Bullamakanka: The Motion Picture	Lilly	Feature film
1987	Bullseye	Brothel Girl	Feature film
1987	Around the World in 80 Ways	Chikita's Friend	Feature film
1992	Fortress	Karen's Cellmate	Feature film
1997	Paws	Messy Mutts Receptionist	Feature film
1999	The Matrix	Priestess	Feature film

=== Television ===
Year	Title	Role	Type
1969	ABC News	Herself (with Hair cast)	TV series, 1 episode
1977	Flashez	Herself (with Renee Geyer and band)	TV series, 1 episode
1986–1987	Sons and Daughters	Recurring role: Billie Fletcher	TV series, 5 episodes
1987-	Rage	Title voiceover	TV series
1987	The Dingo Principle	Guest	TV series, 1 episode
1992	G.P.	Guest role: Renata	TV series, 1 episode
1994–1996	Heartbreak High	Regular role: Ronnie Brooks	TV series, 64 episodes
1997	The Fury Within	Miss Tish	TV movie
1999	Noah's Ark	Ruth's Mother	TV miniseries, 2 episodes
1999	Farscape	Guest role: Priestain Neera	TV series, 1 episode
2000	Water Rats	Guest role: Cynthia Rody	TV series, 1 episode
2003	All Saints	Guest role: Sophie Yew	TV series, 1 episode
2016	Rage: Stories From the Red Couch	Herself	TV special

=== Video game ===
Year	Title	Role	Type
2005	The Matrix: Path of Neo	Priestess	Video game

== Stage ==
Year	Title	Role	Type
1968–70	Hair		
2023–24	Tina – The Musical	Tina's Mother	
