= The Gillies Report =

Television series

- Genre: Sketch comedy
- Directed by: Ted Robinson
- Starring: Max Gillies: John Clarke; Wendy Harmer; Phillip Scott; Tracy Harvey; Patrick Cook
- Country of origin: Australia
- Original language: English
- No. of seasons: 2
- No. of episodes: 14

Production
- Running time: 30 minutes
- Production company: Australian Broadcasting Corporation

Original release
- Network: ABC Television
- Release: 6 July 1984 – 18 October 1985

Related
- The Gillies Republic; Gillies and Company; The Dingo Principle

The Gillies Report is an Australian topical satirical sketch comedy television series that was broadcast on the ABC between 1984 and 1985. The program was best known for sending up politicians and media personalities of the day such as Prime Minister Bob Hawke and Opposition Leader Andrew Peacock.

== Cast ==
The series starred Max Gillies, with a supporting cast that included John Clarke, Wendy Harmer, Phillip Scott, Tracy Harvey, Patrick Cook, Marcus Eyre, Geoff Kelso and Peter Moon. The primary writers were Cook, Clarke, Scott and Don Watson, with extra material by Harmer and Harvey. The on-screen troupe combined a wide range of skills, honed in many areas of arts and entertainment:

- Max Gillies originally trained as a teacher in the late 1960s but soon became immersed in Melbourne's flourishing alternative theatre scene; he quit teaching in 1970 and became a founding member of the Australian Performing Group (APG), where he worked closely with Graeme Blundell, Helen Garner, David Williamson and others on a wide range of theatrical and comedic projects, many of which had a strong political edge;
- John Clarke was already a TV and radio veteran, famous in his home country of New Zealand, where he created the popular comedic Kiwi farmer character Fred Dagg, which he successfully continued after he moved to Australia;
- Wendy Harmer was a rising star of the burgeoning Australian standup comedy circuit;
- Phillip Scott, an accomplished professional musician, had a background in musical cabaret, and wrote/co-wrote many of the shows's satirical musical numbers;
- Tracy Harvey came from a background in performance and comedy in Melbourne, including successful stints with popular Melbourne radio sports satire team Punter to Punter - which also launched the career of Greig Pickhaver, a.k.a. "HG Nelson" -, and its spin-off satirical country music group The Whittle Family;
- Geoff Kelso was well-established in radio comedy and was (with the late Lance Curtis) a central member of the team that created the popular Double J radio sci-fi parody Doctor Poo;
- Patrick Cook was already well known in Australia for his incisive satirical cartoons, and in particular for his notorious legal clash with Modernist architect Harry Seidler. In 1982 Cook published a mordant satirical cartoon that lampooned Seidler's work, depicting the "Harry Seidler Retirement Home" in which pensioners were confined in blank, tower-like enclosures, pierced by slots, through which the occupants were fed and their waste removed with shovels. Enraged by this perceived insult to his work, Seidler promptly sued Cook for defamation, but famously lost both the initial case and the subsequent appeal, and (to Seidler's great chagrin) the publicity surrounding the case saw the cartoon reproduced widely.

== Impact and significance ==
The Gillies Report marked a notable revival of the weekly topical satire sketch format, a genre that had rarely been attempted on Australian TV since the demise of Australia's first and best-known series in this field, The Mavis Bramston Show, in the 1960s. TGR spawned a number of successful sequels including The Gillies Republic (1986), The Dingo Principle (1987), Gillies and Company (1992). Its success also paved the way for other subsequent topical satire series, including BackBerner (1999-2002), the various incarnations of The Chaser (2001–present), and Shaun Micallef's Newstopia (2007-2008) and Mad As Hell (2012–2022), and on radio How Green was my Cactus (1986–present).

The Gillies Report also established or greatly furthered the screen careers of many of the cast, including Gillies, Harmer, Kelso, Clarke, and Harvey. John Clarke - whose regular reports on the fictional Australian sport of "Farnarkling" were another popular segment - carried on the Gillies Report tradition with the successful mockumentary series The Games (1998-2000), and continued with Clarke & Dawe, the long-running weekly satirical political commentary he wrote and performed with Bryan Dawe on ABC-TV until his untimely death at age 68 on 9 April 2017. Phillip Scott went on to co-write, musically direct and perform in the Sydney Theatre Company's annual Wharf Revue from 2000 through until 2017 (a live show of political satire, co-created by and co-starring Jonathan Biggins and Drew Forsythe). Scott, Patrick Cook and Wendy Harmer also worked on the ABC series The Big Gig, of which Ted Robinson was the producer (as he was on The Gillies Report), and Scott and Cook were later employed as writers on the ABC and Channel 10 series Good News Week.

The central feature of the series was Gillies' uncanny ability to perform scathingly accurate satirical impersonations of a wide range of public, media and political figures. These included Ronald Reagan, Mikhail Gorbachev, B. A. Santamaria, Don Chipp, Andrew Peacock, Queensland Premier Joh Bjelke-Petersen, morbidly obese Queensland politician Russ Hinze (whom Gillies portrayed in a costume fashioned from a beanbag chair), brewing magnate and conservative political figure John Elliott - whose regular exclamation "Pig's arse!" became a popular catchphrase - and especially for his famous impression of Bob Hawke, Australia's Prime Minister at the time - although Hawke was reported to have been irked by Gillies' portrayal, and made disparaging remarks about it to him when they met, even though Hawke claimed he had never seen the show.

The Gillies Report was followed by sequels The Gillies Republic (1986) and Gillies and Company (1992). Cook, Scott and Kelso would go on to make a similar program for the ABC called The Dingo Principle (1987). Harmer went on to host the landmark ABC-TV live sketch comedy series The Big Gig, and Peter Moon became a leading cast member of the popular and long-running TV sketch comedy series Fast Forward.

=== The "Goanna" Sketch ===
One of the series' most celebrated sketches was its famous send-up of media magnate Kerry Packer, who was reported to have been "furious" about it. At the time, Packer was in the news because he had been investigated by the Costigan Commission for his suspected involvement in organised crime, drug dealing and tax evasion rackets, and the claims caused a sensation in the Australian media. Packer, who was codenamed "Squirrel" in the Commission's evidence, could only be referred to in the media by the nickname "Goanna" (coined by The National Times), due to Australia's draconian libel and defamation laws. This led to a number of satires on the matter, including the Gillies Report sketch and a satirical T-shirt marketed by a Queensland independent satirical magazine The Cane Toad Times, which conflated the Costigan allegations with the Lacoste shirt brand, renaming the brand as "Lacostigan" and replacing Lacoste's alligator emblem with a goanna, in reference to Packer.

The Gillies Report sketch also parodied Packer's self-serving appearance to defend himself on his own network's current-affairs programme. It opens with Patrick Cook, in barrister's wig and gown, putting questions to 'Packer' (Gillies), about the allegations. He at first responds amiably, but gradually becomes enraged by the interrogation and the hostile reaction of the audience, and finally smashes up his desk, revealing that he has a long lizard-like tail. As the cast perform a satirical quasi-operatic song about the case, Packer - now transformed into "The Goanna" - is pursued through the TV station by the mob but, parodying King Kong, he escapes by scaling the transmitter tower of Packer's Sydney TV station TCN-9 where, now grown to gigantic size, he catches and crushes a news helicopter from a rival network. The desk-smashing also lampooned Packer's famously volcanic temper, and referenced a well-known rumour of the time, which claimed that Packer once smashed up his own office in a fit of rage during one of his many attempts to quit smoking.

== Awards ==
At the 28th Annual TV Week Logie Awards held in 1986, The Gillies Report won the Logie for the "Best Light Entertainment Series".

== Videography ==
Highlights of the 1984 season were released by the ABC to home video as The Gillies Report. The compilation runs for 105 minutes. It was distributed in 1985 by Thorn-EMI Screen Entertainment Australia in both VHS (Z ABCV 8505) and Beta (B ABCV 8505) VCR tape formats.

Similarly, highlights of the 1985 season were released by the ABC to home video as The Best Of Gillies. This compilation runs for 63 minutes. It was distributed in 1986 by Festival Records Pty. Ltd. in VHS format (85046).

Neither of these tapes, nor any other compilation from the two series, has been re-released on DVD.
