= Those Dear Departed =

- Directed by: Ted Robinson
- Written by: Steve J. Spears
- Produced by: Phillip Emmanuel
- Starring: Garry McDonald; Pamela Stephenson; Su Cruickshank
- Music by: Phillip Scott
- Release date: 1987
- Country: Australia
- Language: English
- Budget: A$950,000
- Box office: A$33,887 (Australia)

Those Dear Departed, also known as Ghosts Can Do It!, is a 1987 Australian black comedy film directed by Ted Robinson and starring Garry McDonald, Pamela Stephenson and Su Cruickshank.

== Cast ==
- Garry McDonald as Max Falcon
- Pamela Stephenson as Marilyn Falcon
- Su Cruickshank as Norda
- Marian Dworakowski as Richard
- Ritchie Singer as Gordon
- John Clarke as Inspector Jerry
- Jonathan Biggins as Sgt. Steve
- Graeme Blundell as Dr. Howie
- Phillip Scott as Bow-tied Bon Vivant (uncredited)
