= Flatfoot (play) =

Play by David Williamson

- Original language: English
- Written by: David Williamson

Premiere
- Date: 2003

Flatfoot is a 2003 comedic play by David Williamson about the Roman playwright Plautus. It is one of Williamson's few plays not to be set in contemporary Australia and was written as a vehicle for actor Drew Forsythe. It is a play-within-a-play, featuring Plautus' play The Swaggering Soldier.

== Synopsis ==
Flatfoot is the story of Titus Maccius Plautus (Drew Forsythe) is an ancient Roman playwright, who must convince his producer, Crassus Dives (John Gregg), that his new play, The Swaggering Soldier, will be a success and please the Roman censor. Plautus (meaning 'flatfoot') is forced to present an improvised performance before he play is yet written, playing all the characters himself, together with his wife, Cleostrata (Tina Bursill).

Plautus' uncensored play meets resistance by defying various Roman societal conventions (with themes such as abolishing slavery, lampooning authoritative figures and allowing women to assume roles in the theatre).

Williamson:

I felt strongly about Plautus. He was a highly popular playwright. But he was going through the same agonies as any playwright so I identified with him – trying to convince the producer to put his next play on, trying to get his actors in line, trying to cast it, trying to keep them in order, trying to sort out his marital problems at the same time. He was a hugely funny character and I really liked him.

== Performance history ==
Flatfoot was first performed at a rehearsed reading at the Longweekend Festival in Williamson's home town of Noosa, Queensland. It then played ten sold-out performances at the Noosa Arts Theatre, followed by a four-week run at the Ensemble Theatre, in Sydney and a nine-day run in Melbourne.

== Cast ==
- Drew Forsythe as Titus Maccius Plautus playing various characters (including Pyrgopolynices, Palaestrio and Pleusicles)
- Tina Bursill as Cleostrata playing various characters (including Philocomasium)
- John Gregg as Crassus Dives
