= Three Men of the City =

- Also known as: The Company Men
- Genre: Miniseries
- Written by: Ted Roberts
- Directed by: Michael Jenkins; Julian Pringle; Rob Stewart; Eric Taylor
- Starring: Michael Craig; Peter Collingwood; Penne Hackforth-Jones
- Country of origin: Australia
- Original language: English
- No. of episodes: 7

Production
- Producer: Eric Taylor
- Running time: 60 minutes
- Production company: ABC

Original release
- Network: ABC
- Release: 11 February 1974 – 4 September 1975

Three Men of the City is a 1974 Australian television series about a corporate battle. It was followed in 1975 by the series The Company Men. In the sequel, Sir William's position as chairman was under siege.

== Cast ==
- Anne Haddy as Margaret Styles
- Ken Goodlet
- Richard Lupino
- Michael Craig
- Peter Collingwood
- Penne Hackforth-Jones as Jeannie Martin
- Drew Forsythe as Ken Styles
- Sean Scully as Keith Langdon

== Episodes ==
1. Who Gives This Woman? - 15 Feb 174
2. Afternoon Cloud - 22 Feb 1974
3. A Kind of Revenge - 1 March 1974
