= Billy's Holiday =

- Directed by: Richard Wherrett
- Written by: Denis Whitburn
- Produced by: Tristram Miall
- Starring: Max Cullen
- Production company: Beyond Films
- Distributed by: Anchor Bay Entertainment, Miramax
- Release date: October 19, 1995
- Running time: 92 minutes
- Country: Australia
- Language: English
- Budget: A$4 million
- Box office: A$68,472 (Australia)

Billy's Holiday is a 1995 Australian musical film, directed by Richard Wherrett and starring Max Cullen. Based on Cullen's real-life ability to vocally impersonate Billie Holiday, the film revolves around a man named Billy Apples, played by Cullen, whose life and music career are stagnating until he is visited by Holiday's spirit and finds himself gifted with her voice. Despite finding a receptive audience at the Cannes Film Festival and some success with international distributors, the film was negatively received in Australia and was a box office bomb.

== Plot summary ==
As the film begins, bus driver Sid (Drew Forsythe) is stuck in traffic on King Street, Newtown, making light of the situation by playing "I Can't Get Started" on trumpet to his passengers.

We then meet Billy Appleby, known professionally as Billy Apples (Max Cullen) - a divorced, middle-aged man who owns a hardware store in Newtown. In his spare time, he plays trombone and sings lead vocals in The Billy Apples Band. He is dating a woman named Kate (Kris McQuade), but is going through a period of indecision and inertia in life as he recovers from his divorce from Louise (Tina Bursill). Meanwhile, Kate's friend Julie (Genevieve Lemon) has lately been studying Ancient Egyptian afterlife beliefs and the possibility of "soul reincarnation".

One night, after Billy sings "After You've Gone" in a gruff voice at a local bar, Julie leads a séance at a yum cha restaurant which hypnotises those around the table. While staring at a salt shaker, Billy is visited by the spirit of Billie Holiday. Later that night, Billy arrives home to find that the key to his door is bent and does not work in the lock. His daughter Casey (Rachael Coopes) is embarrassed to find him sitting on the roof, watching shooting stars. Returning to the door, he finds that the key does now work and opens the door onto a bright light. In the morning, Casey overhears Billy singing "After You've Gone" while showering in a voice uncannily resembling Holiday's.

At his next gig, he sings "Am I Blue?" in his newfound Holiday voice to a transfixed audience. Later that night he tells Kate, "I felt different. Released. New." His daughter Casey is again embarrassed in front of her friends as they witness Billy recreate Gene Kelly's "Singin' in the Rain" dance on their street, but this moment leads to a discussion between them about his newly-awakened emotional state. Riding Sid's late-night bus to the end of the line at Glebe Point, Billy sings "Why Was I Born?" in the Holiday voice to the Anzac Bridge and Sid joins him on trumpet.

When Billy sings "What a Night, What a Moon, What a Boy", it leads both Julie and Kate to call his sexuality and gender identity into question. Kate confronts him about this, saying to him, "It's as if she's inside you." Record company executives also begin to express interest in Billy, considering him marketable as a "gender bender". Billy resents the projection of others onto his performance as Holiday. At one stage he hallucinates a vision of himself in the mirror wearing a fruit hat à la Carmen Miranda and remarks, "Strange... fruit." Billy rejects the offer of a recording contract at first, but is later peer pressured into signing by his bandmates and family members.

In the studio, he records "I Want the Whole Fairytale" in the Holiday voice, though the record company soon force him to drop the band and record as a solo artist. Kate tells him that he has "locked up his heart", but he insists on pursuing this career opportunity. Walking through an empty train station, he sings "I Had Too Much to Love Last Time" in a more refined version of his original voice as Kate listens on. Later, he records "Mr. Exhilaration" in the Holiday voice. This becomes the title track of his new album, which tops the charts in Australia upon release. The band continue on with Rob (Richard Roxburgh) on lead vocals, who runs through "Ragtime Romeo Ball" at band practice.

Before a show at Sydney's State Theatre, Billy films a music video for "Is You Is Or Is You Ain't My Baby." Louise also manipulates her way into a backing vocal position in Billy's act. Meanwhile, Casey mentions to Kate that she has heard Billy singing "I Had Too Much to Love Last Time" around the house. Kate then digs up an old record in which Billy sang "I Had Too Much to Love Last Time" as a duet in a refined voice with Louise, but with Louise hogging the spotlight. This convinces Billy's family and friends to join together and force him to use this voice again, believing that he is "not lost, just dozing."

That night, Billy opens the set with "It Must Have Been Easy for You", as Louise oversells her backing vocals to force her way into the spotlight. Billy's old band return to the stage unexpectedly and begin to play "I Can't Get Started." He then attempts to sing in the Holiday voice, but finds it will not come out. Louise seizes the opportunity to take lead vocals. From the side of the stage, Billy's family urge him to sing from the heart. He begins to apply his more refined and personal voice to the delight of the audience. Louise is spun off stage, thwarting her attempt to hijack the show and leaving Billy to complete the show in a new voice that belongs to him alone. He receives a standing ovation as the spirit of Holiday watches on approvingly from the back of the audience, blowing a kiss and then walking away.

That night, Billy and Casey sit on their house roof and she reflects that she is glad to have taken after him. Billy then visits Kate at her hairdressing job the next day, offering her a rose and singing "I'll Do Beautiful Things to Your Heart".

== Production ==
In 1977, Denis Whitburn wrote the play The Siege of Frank Sinatra, based on the infamous 1974 incident in which Sinatra was held hostage by Australian trade unions after calling a local journalist a "two-dollar whore." (This later became the basis for the 2003 film The Night We Called It a Day, though that film did not use Whitburn's play as source material.) The play debuted in 1980 at Sydney's King O'Malley Theatre, with Max Cullen in the role of showbiz reporter Leo Coote. One night after a performance, while drinking in a local bar with Whitburn, Cullen spontaneously sang "Am I Blue?" in an uncannily accurate impersonation of Billie Holiday to an enthralled audience.

In 1983, Richard Wherrett directed the ABC TV movie The Girl from Moonooloo. This film revolves around a young man who is cast as Ginger Meggs in a radio serial, despite the fact that his mother performs the voice of Meggs in reality. In the film's climax, he develops the confidence to use his real voice and become famous for who he really is. In Wherrett's autobiography, The Floor of Heaven, he called The Girl from Moonooloo "a trial run for Billy's Holiday" in hindsight, pointing out that "both trace the journey of the central character to the point where they must speak/sing in their own voice (with) dream sequences, some dance spectaculars, and a climax almost exactly alike." Both also pay homage to Singin' in the Rain.

In the early 1990s, Whitburn wrote the screenplay for Billy's Holiday in three weeks, inspired by his vivid memory of Cullen's performance as Holiday. Wherrett picked up the project as he was drawn to the premise of "a middle-aged man getting a second chance at life and love", and later connected this to his diagnosis as HIV positive. It was Wherrett's first feature film after a long career in theatre and occasionally in television.

The film's opening shot begins as an extreme close-up on the mouth of Sid's trumpet as he plays "I Can't Get Started" at the back of the bus, pulls back to the driver's seat as Sid delivers the line "We can't get started!", then leaves the bus and continues into the air, becoming a long shot revealing that the bus is stuck in traffic along King Street, Newtown. This 25-second sequence required the cameraman to walk backwards down the bus with a steadicam, then step onto a giant cherry picker which lifted into the air. As the weather was especially windy, an additional crew member also had to hold the cameraman in place as the platform was lifted up. The shot was finished after 17 takes, which shut down King Street for six hours.

Wherrett never returned to filmmaking after Billy's Holiday, but directed several more stage productions and worked on the opening ceremony of the Sydney 2000 Olympics before his death in 2001.

== Home video ==
In 1996, a pan and scan version of Billy's Holiday was released on VHS in Australia. In 2001, a widescreen version was released by Anchor Bay Entertainment as a Region 1 DVD and on VHS in the United States only. The film is currently out of print and unavailable throughout the world, including on streaming services.

== Soundtrack ==
The musical score was written by the late Larry Muhoberac, who won an AFI award that year for Best Musical Score. It was produced in Sydney, Australia, with co-production, instrumental performances and engineering by Parrish Muhoberac. James Morrison played trumpet, including the opening rendition of "I Can't Get Started" in the style of Bunny Berigan. The soundtrack was released on CD by Mercury Records.

== Novelisation ==
A novelisation was written by Whitburn and published by Pan Macmillan in 1995. Amongst other things, the novelisation much more directly explores the transgender and queer implications of the story, and makes clear that the voice Billy develops by the end of the film is meant to sound like a third, more refined voice, not a return to the voice he had in the first place.

== Critical reception ==
Billy's Holiday was negatively received in Australia. "The problem", wrote Barbara Creed in The Age, "is that Billy is neither black nor female." While feeling that the "glossy, dramatic musical numbers" were the film's strength and recalled the films of Fred Astaire and Gene Kelly, she called the film "hackneyed (and) terminally slow... The characters are one-dimensional and the dialogue is appalling." Paul Byrnes called the film "a folly of substantial proportions (that) dies a thousand deaths before it's over", but spoke highly of the "heartfelt and true" scene in which Cullen sings "Am I Blue?"

"It's unclear exactly what we're meant to make of the changes that result from Billy's discovery", wrote Tom Ryan, "for Wherrett seems more interested in the opportunities they provide for production numbers... Perhaps (Billy's) acceptance of the gift nature has bestowed upon him is supposed to represent his first step towards self discovery... But what is one then to make of the eventual restoration of the old Billy?" Ryan apparently did not understand that the audience is supposed to think Billy develops a new, refined voice that is truly his own; this is ambiguous in the film and only made clear in the novelisation.

Cullen himself was also critical of the film, telling an interviewer that he thought "the gimmick went too far".

One positive review came from Arizona Republic's Bob Fenster, who called the film "a sly sendup of the music business (that) will make you want to sing and dance up and down the aisles". The film was also a critical success when it debuted at the Cannes Film Festival, leading to its sale to Miramax and several other distributors for international territories. Cullen recalled several Cannes attendees telling him the film had genuinely moved them and made them cry.

== Cast ==
- Max Cullen as Billy Apples
- Kris McQuade as Kate Hammond
- Tina Bursill as Louise
- Drew Forsythe as Sid Banks
- Genevieve Lemon as Julie
- Richard Roxburgh as Rob McSpedden
- Rachael Coopes as Casey Appleby
- Arianthe Galani as Anna
- Maggie Kirkpatrick as Maureen O'Hara
- Sacha Horler as Kristin
- Jeanette Cronin as Roz 'Shutterbug'
- Phillip Scott as Liberace
- Paul Goddard as Gary 'Stylist'
- Jade Gatt as Alex
