= Patrick Cook =

Australian cartoonist

Patrick St. John Cook (born 6 August 1949) is an Australian cartoonist, satirical writer and performer known for his work in The National Times, The Bulletin and on television.

Cook was born in Weymouth, England, and emigrated to Australia as a child. He received no formal art training, instead working as a cartoonist and illustrator on several Sydney university newspapers. His friend Bob Ellis got him a job at Nation Review in 1971, where he began his career as an editorial cartoonist.

His controversial newspaper cartoons made him a household name, and a court hearing on his cartoon about architect Harry Seidler made front-page news in 1984. He received a number of Walkley Awards for his print cartooning.

He co-wrote and featured in the satirical ABC television series The Gillies Report, which was broadcast in 1984 and 1985, and The Dingo Principle which was broadcast in 1987.

He is married to the writer and comedian Jean Kittson and they have two daughters.
