= Safety in Numbers (musical) =

Australian musical

Safety in Numbers is an Australian musical with book and lyrics by Luke Hardy and Phillip Scott and music by Phillip Scott. The musical concerns the lives of four people, aged from early 20s to early 40s, sharing an apartment in the inner-Sydney suburb of Glebe: Alex, an ageing, out-of-work gay actor; Elaine, a psychiatric social worker who has left her marriage; Julia, a scatty student finding refuge from a broken family; and Joe, a country boy exploring the bright lights of the city. It was inspired by the writers' own experience of living under similar conditions in London.

== Productions ==
Safety in Numbers premiered at the Q Theatre in Penrith, outer western Sydney on 18 May 1982. Directed by Arthur Dicks, the cast included Simon Burke (Joe), Robyn Arthur (Elaine), Frank Garfield (Alex) and Mariette Rups (Julia). Playing until 19 June 1982, the production then toured for a short season at the Orange Civic Theatre before returning to the Q Theatre for a further week. An original cast recording was released on cassette.

The musical transferred to the Ensemble Theatre in Sydney for a two-month season from 9 December 1982 to 29 January 1983, as part of the Festival of Sydney.

A second production was performed in Perth by the Hole in the Wall Theatre, from 24 March to 23 April 1983. This was directed by Jenny McNae and featured Michael Turkic, Denise Kirby, Dennis Clements and Caroline McKenzie.

== Musical numbers ==
From the cast recording:

- "Safety in Numbers"
- "He said, I Said"
- "Song of Unlimited Potential"
- "Nothing Much"
- "Romeo and Julia"
- "Something Happened"
- "Drinking Duet"
- "Heat Tango"
- "I Just Want A Woman"
- "Exam Blues"
- "What I Needed"
- "High Rise Loving"
- "Aren't You Boring"
- "High Rise Loving (reprise)"
- "Surviving"
