= It's My Party! =

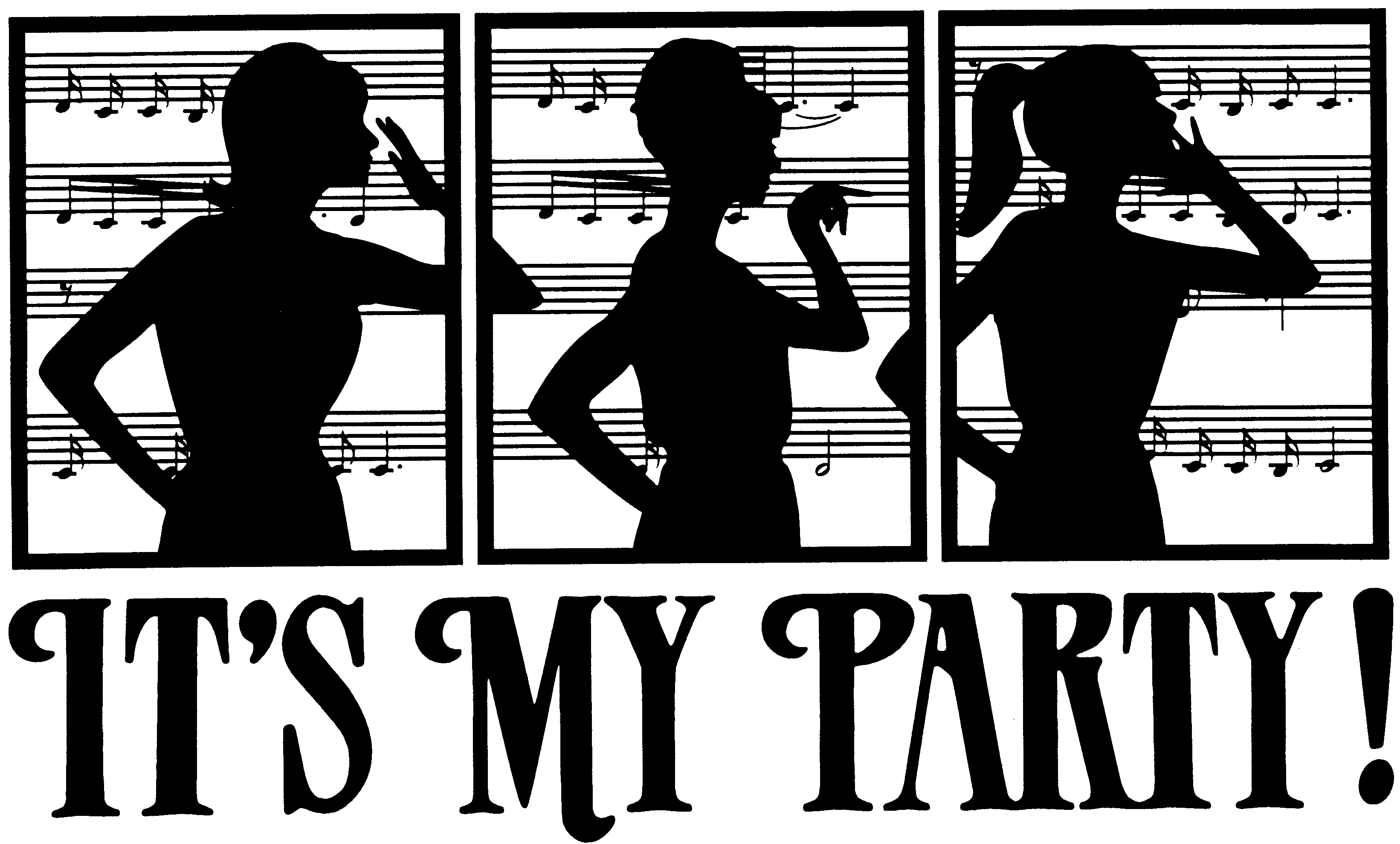

Background information
- Origin: Rochester, New York
- Genres: Rock, Pop Rock
- Years active: 1985-present
- Label: Mister Cat Records
- Past members: Eliza Schneider
- Website: itsmypartyonline.com

It's My Party! (stylized as IT'S MY PARTY!) is a 1960s-inspired teen girl group from Rochester, New York. Founded in 1985, the band consists of three vocalists who are regularly renewed. There have been over 32 vocalists since the group was founded. It's My Party! performs covers of 1960s hit songs and original material written by John Giotto, Paul Kanack, and Syeed Abdulal-Haqq with the help of Ron Stein. It's My Party! was included in John Clemente's book Fabulous Females Who Rocked the World in 2013.

== History ==
It's My Party! is a 1960s-inspired band formed in 1985 by John Giotto and Gary Skinner. The group replicates the early 1960s style by dressing in period-specific clothing and incorporating choreography from groups such as The Angels, The Pixies Three and The Secrets. The band's first performance was for Penfield, New York's 175th anniversary. At the time it was founded, the band consisted of college-aged women. Giotto, the group's producer, thought the band lacked authenticity because the women were too old to sing about teenage topics so they reformed with singers from Irondequoit High School. In 1988, It's My Party! released their first album which was self-titled and comprised seven original songs.

The band went through a brief hiatus and reformed again in 1992. Along with live performances, they have appeared on radio programs including "Brother Wease." It's My Party! began recording their performances in 1997. In 1999, It's My Party! made their television debut appearing on The Record Collector's Corner, broadcast from Medford, Massachusetts. The band performed with The Pixies Three at the Marshfield Fair in Marshfield, Massachusetts in 2000, and the International Pop Overthrow Festival in July of that year.

== Discography ==
- It's My Party! (1988)
- Can't (1997)
- That Boy John (1998)
- Can I Get to Know You Better? (2000)
- He's a Rebel: The Gene Pitney Story Retold (2002)
- R.S.V.P. (2007)
- Wanna Make Him Mine (2012)
- He Wasn’t Like That (When He Used to Be Mine) (2015)
- It's Summertime USA (2022)
