= Casula Powerhouse Arts Centre =

Australian multi-disciplinary arts centre

Coordinates: 33.9493°S 150.9128°E

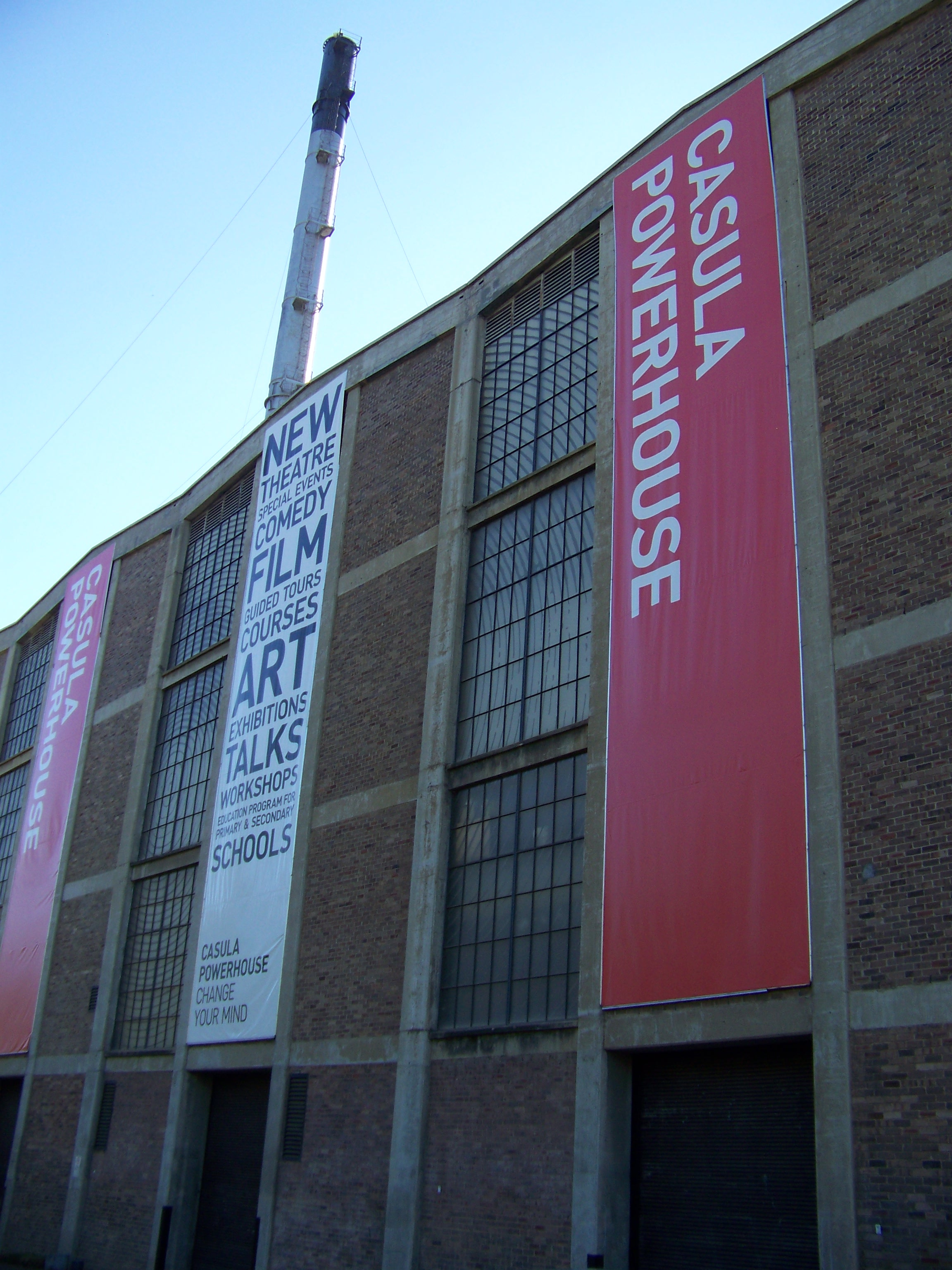
Casula Powerhouse Arts Centre, 2010

Casula Powerhouse Arts Centre (CPAC), commonly referred to as Casula Powerhouse, is a multi-disciplinary arts centre in Casula, a south-western outer suburb of Sydney, New South Wales, Australia. Before being renovated and converted into an arts centre, the building was known as Liverpool Powerhouse. Since 2016 CPAC has hosted the Blake Prizes, comprising two art prizes and a residency, as well as the Blake Poetry Prize.

== History ==
Liverpool Powerhouse was constructed in 1951, one of a number of identical power stations built to cater for growing demand in Sydney winters. In 1955, a 250-foot (76 m) high chimney was built to replace four shorter ones, which allowed the smoke to blow over residents' houses and soil their washing.

In 1976, the power station was shut down, and bought by Liverpool City Council, New South Wales, in 1978 and allowed to become derelict for nearly ten years. In 1985 a residents' plebiscite voted for the building to be converted into an arts centre, and work began in 1987 to provide an electricity supply and create office space.

In 1993, during Mark Latham's tenure as mayor, the renamed Casula Powerhouse was allocated funding in the council budget. Inaugural Director John Kirkman invited Judy Watson to design the floor of the centre, which became known as the Koori Floor. Influenced by Western Desert art as well as local Aboriginal heritage, the names of the three traditional owners of the land: Tharawal, Gandangarra and Dharuk, are inscribed in stainless steel, inlaid in the floor.

The newly refurbished building opened as an arts centre in October 1994. It proceeded to host many exhibitions and events, including a number with Vietnamese themes.

From June 2006 until 5 April 2008, a capital project was undertaken to improve and expand the centre, collaboratively undertaken by the NSW Government, Create NSW, Liverpool City Council and its communities.

== Description ==
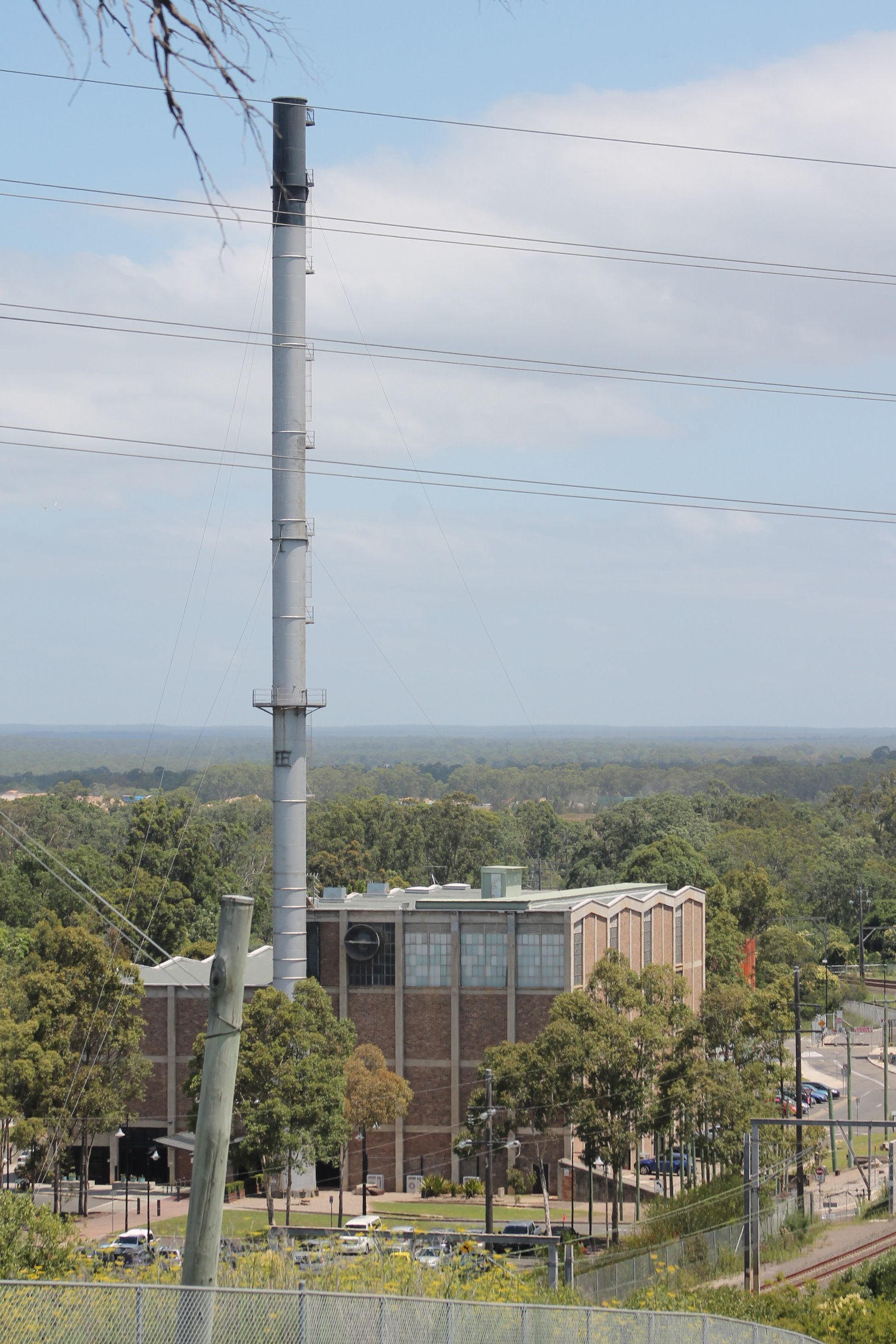
CPAC in 2014

The building is located on the banks of the Georges River, within the 20 ha (49-acre) Casula Parklands and next to Casula railway station, at 1 Powerhouse Road.

The centre houses an exhibition space that meets international standards, a 326-seat theatre, a multi-purpose theatre/performance space, artists' studios and residency spaces, and seven additional exhibition spaces. There is also a collection storage space and additional office space. Bellbird Dining & Bar (launched in 2017) provides restaurant facilities, and the centre is open every day of the week.

The centre is located in a very multicultural area; Liverpool is one of the two most diverse local government areas in Australia (with around 150 languages spoken), and CPAC's programmes reflect this. It engages will local as well as global communities.

== Governance ==
Craig Donarski, whose parents are Polish migrants, has been director of CPAC since 2016.

== Collections ==
The Liverpool Collection, co-managed by CPAC and Liverpool Regional Museum (opened 1989), comprises around 30,000 artworks and cultural heritage artefacts, and both preserves items of historical significance as well as showcases work of established and emerging artists.

== Events and exhibitions ==
=== Blake Prizes ===
After the Blake Society had lost sponsorship for its art prizes in 2015, CPAC and Liverpool City Council announced that they would be funding and managing the prizes from 2016, with the exhibition and awards moving to Western Sydney from their former venue partner, the UNSW Art & Design (now UNSW School of Art & Design) in Paddington.

=== Other events and exhibitions ===
CPAC also hosts the annual Mil-Pra AECG (Aboriginal Education Consultative Group) and Liverpool Art Society exhibitions.

In September 2001, an exhibition featuring the work of post-Tianenmen Square Chinese migrant Fan Dongwang, entitled Shanghai Star, was mounted at the centre.

In September/October 2015, CPAC celebrated its 21st anniversary, with an exhibition of works by 21 contemporary Australian artists who had had a close connection with the centre in the past, such as having their work exhibited there for the first time.

In 2018, the centre hosted Mandaean artist Yuhana Nashmi's Sh-ken-ta, an exhibition of a shkinta (reed house used for Mandaean priestly rituals), as a site-specific installation.

During January and February 2018, the centre hosted free screenings of Japanese manga films as part of the Manga Hokusai Manga touring exhibition program, put on in collaboration with The Japan Foundation.

In February 2019, CPAC launched the first of a series of live music events, featuring local hip hop group Freesouls to headline the concert.

During the first wave of the COVID-19 pandemic in Australia in 2020, the centre was forced to close for some weeks. During this time, the exhibition Pulse of the Dragon, an exhibition showcasing the art of five Chinese Australian and five Chinese artists, went online. In November, it reopened with four new exhibitions, after the Koori Floor (see History, above) had been restored. The centre reopened on 3 June with two exhibitions, Adaptation (comprising works by artists with disability or chronic illness) and A Familiar Place I've Never Seen, an exhibition combining Persian calligraphy and photography, with input from Western Sydney residents who had been immigrants and refugees.

The first Casula Powerhouse Aboriginal Scholarship Award was announced in 2020.

Two exhibitions of Ken Done's work were scheduled to run in July 2021, an evening of conversation with Done on the 31st. However, this coincided with the lockdowns that commenced in mid-2021 owing to a second wave of COVID-19 in NSW. With Sydney back under lockdown, the centre offered an extensive online programme, including virtual tours of the centre and several exhibitions, including a 3D tour of the work of local Croatian-born artist Gina Sinozich, who died in 2020; free screenings of films; a book club for youth; online activities for children; videos of young musicians and various instructional videos.
