= Roslyn Packer Theatre =

Australian theatre

- The Ros
- Interactive map of Roslyn Packer Theatre
- Full name: Roslyn Packer Theatre Walsh Bay
- Former names: Sydney Theatre
- Address: 22 Hickson Road, Walsh Bay
- Location: Sydney, New South Wales, Australia
- Coordinates: 33°51′26″S 151°12′17″E
- Owner: Sydney Theatre Company
- Capacity: 896
- Type: Theatre
- Production: Nineteen Eighty-Four
- Public transit: The Rocks, Circular Quay

Construction
- Groundbreaking: October 2001
- Built: January 2002 – January 2004
- Opened: 10 January 2004
- Architects: Andrew Andersons; PTW Architects

Website
- roslynpackertheatre.com.au

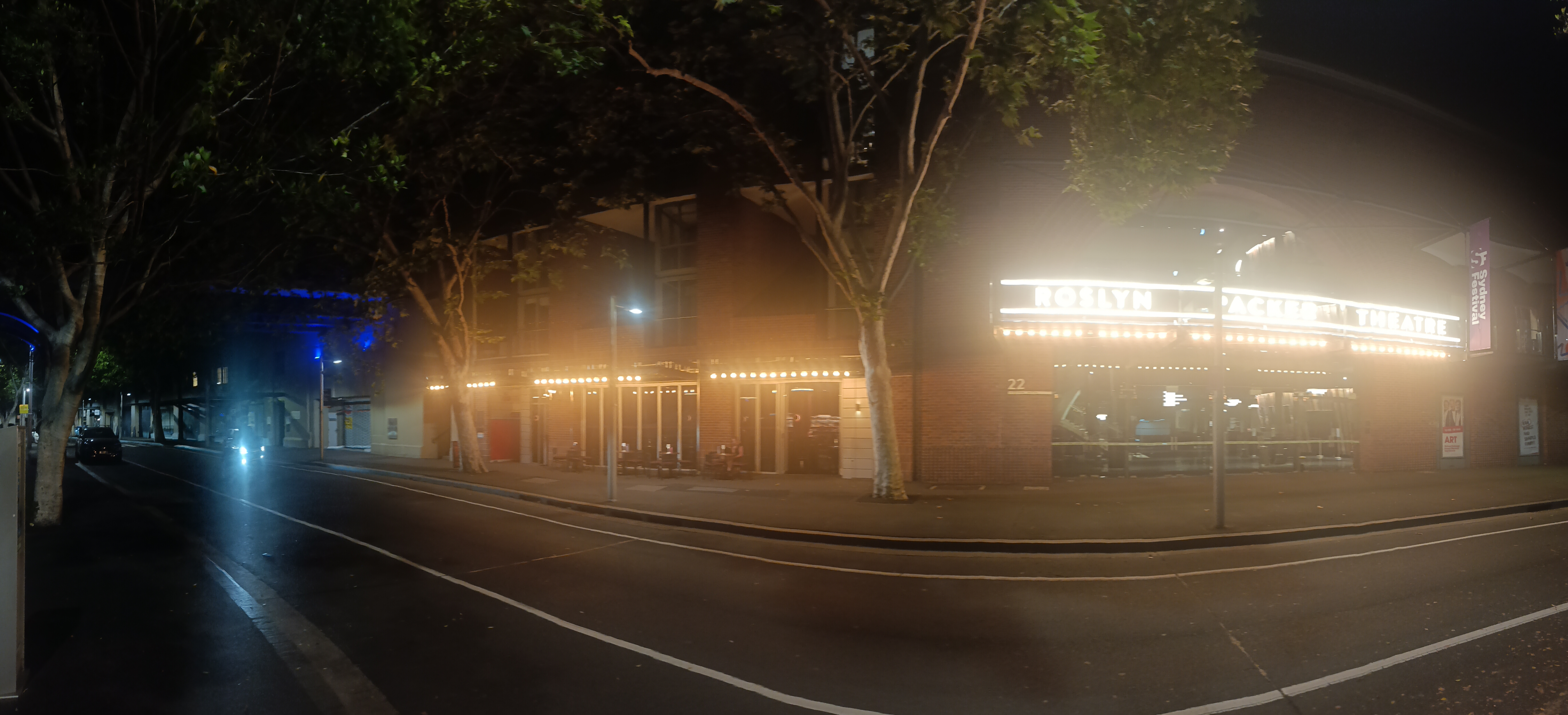
Roslyn Packer Theatre. 2026

The Roslyn Packer Theatre is a theatre in Millers Point, Sydney, Australia. It is a former cargo storage site from the 1830’s located on Hickson Road opposite Pier 6/7 on Walsh Bay. It is also just 150 metres west of the Wharf Theatre, which is another venue that is operated by the Sydney Theatre Company. It seats up to 896 people.

First opening in 2004 as the Sydney Theatre, it was renamed in March 2015 in honour of Roslyn Packer AC. James Packer and family made a philanthropic gift to the Sydney Theatre Company in advance of the renaming.

The theatre is used by the Sydney Theatre Company, the Sydney Dance Company and the Sydney Writers' Festival.

== Gallery ==
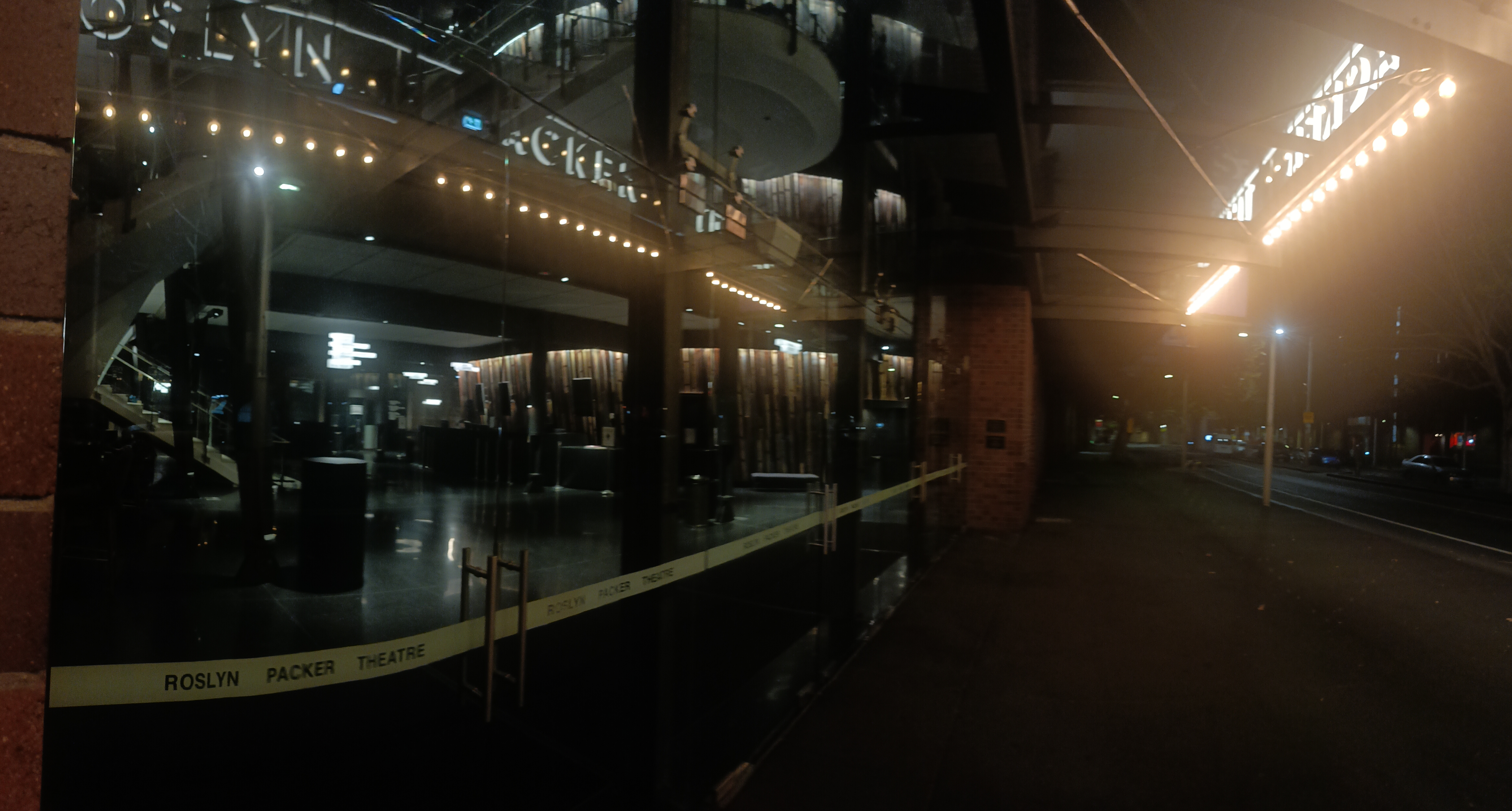
Main entrance to the theatre. 2026
