= Wharf Theatre =

Theatre located on heritage wharf structure, Walsh Bay, Sydney, Australia

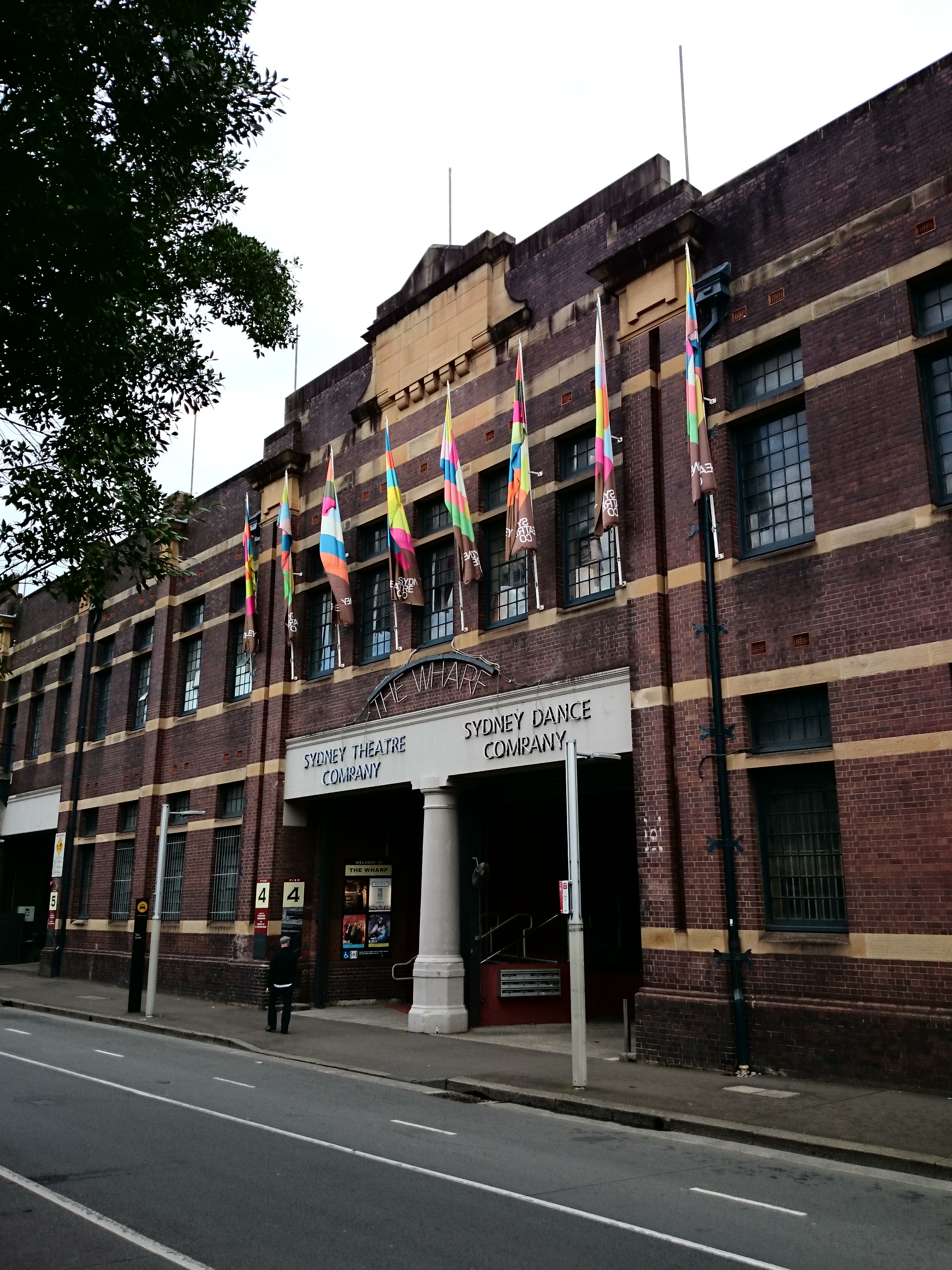
- Pier 4/5 at Walsh Bay
- Interactive map of Wharf Theatre
- Address: Pier 4/5, 15 Hickson Road, Dawes Point NSW 2000; Sydney; Australia
- Coordinates: 33.855087°S 151.205757°E
- Capacity: Wharf 1 Theatre: 330; Wharf 2 Theatre: 200

Construction
- Opened: November 1984
- Rebuilt: 2021
- Architect: Vivian Fraser (Stage 2: Hassell)

Website
- https://www.sydneytheatre.com.au/your-visit/the-wharf-theatres

The Wharf Theatre is a theatre in Sydney, New South Wales, Australia. This theatre is part of the Sydney Theatre Company and located on Pier 4/5 of the former Sydney port facility in Walsh Bay at Dawes Point.

== History ==
In 1829, the first jetty in the area of Pier 4/5 was constructed and called ‘Pitman’s Wharf’. In 1919, work on Pier 4/5, was completed by H.D Walsh.

In 1979, the Sydney Theatre Company was searching for a home. Elizabeth Butcher, administrator at NIDA, discovered the derelict finger wharves at Walsh Bay and proposed that Pier 4/5 be restored and become STC's place of residence. Her recommendation was accepted by the Premier's department. When the designing architect, Vivian Fraser, began work on the redevelopment of Pier 4/5 one of the major design issues was which end of the finger wharf to put the theatre. In keeping with the brief to do as inexpensive a conversion as possible, the government architects did a feasibility study which put the theatre at the Hickson Road end of The Wharf. Fraser argued, on aesthetic grounds, that the theatre should be put at the sea end. Richard Wherrett, artistic director at the time, agreed with him and it was their opinion which prevailed. In Wherrett's words “I liked the metaphorical notion that every time you went into the place to see a play, you went on some kind of journey”. Vivian Fraser's re-development of Pier 4/5 officially opened by Premier Neville Wran in 1984.

== Theatres ==
The Wharf Theatre contains two theatres. Wharf 1 of 339 seats and Wharf 2 of 205 seats. From the street a 200-metre wooden walkway lined with framed posters of STC productions takes patrons through the history of the theatre. Large windows are open to the Sydney Harbour Bridge and the waters of the harbour. At the end of the building, The Theatre Bar at the End of the Wharf, complete with east and west facing balconies, provide views of Luna Park and the North Shore skyline.

Approximately the size of 1.5 rugby fields, the Wharf cost $3.7 million to restore, and took the builders 56 weeks to refurbish. The influence of water is seen in the company's logo and the use of blue as the company's colour. The Wharf Theatre is mentioned in the 2013 travel book National Geographic Traveler: Sydney, as a venue for one of Sydney's main theatre companies.

== Renovation and reopening ==
The theatre closed for renovations in 2018 and reopened in February 2021 for the performances of Kate Mulvany's adaptation of Ruth Park's Playing Beatie Bow. They include "modernised theatres and audience facilities, more flexible theatres, rehearsal and workshop spaces".

== Architecture awards ==
In 1985 the theatres won the NSW Lloyd Rees Award for Civic Design and the RAIA President's Award for Recycled Buildings at the national architecture awards. The Wharf Theatre later received both the New South Wales Enduring Architecture Award and the National Award for Enduring Architecture from the Australian Institute of Architects in 2008.

== Gallery ==
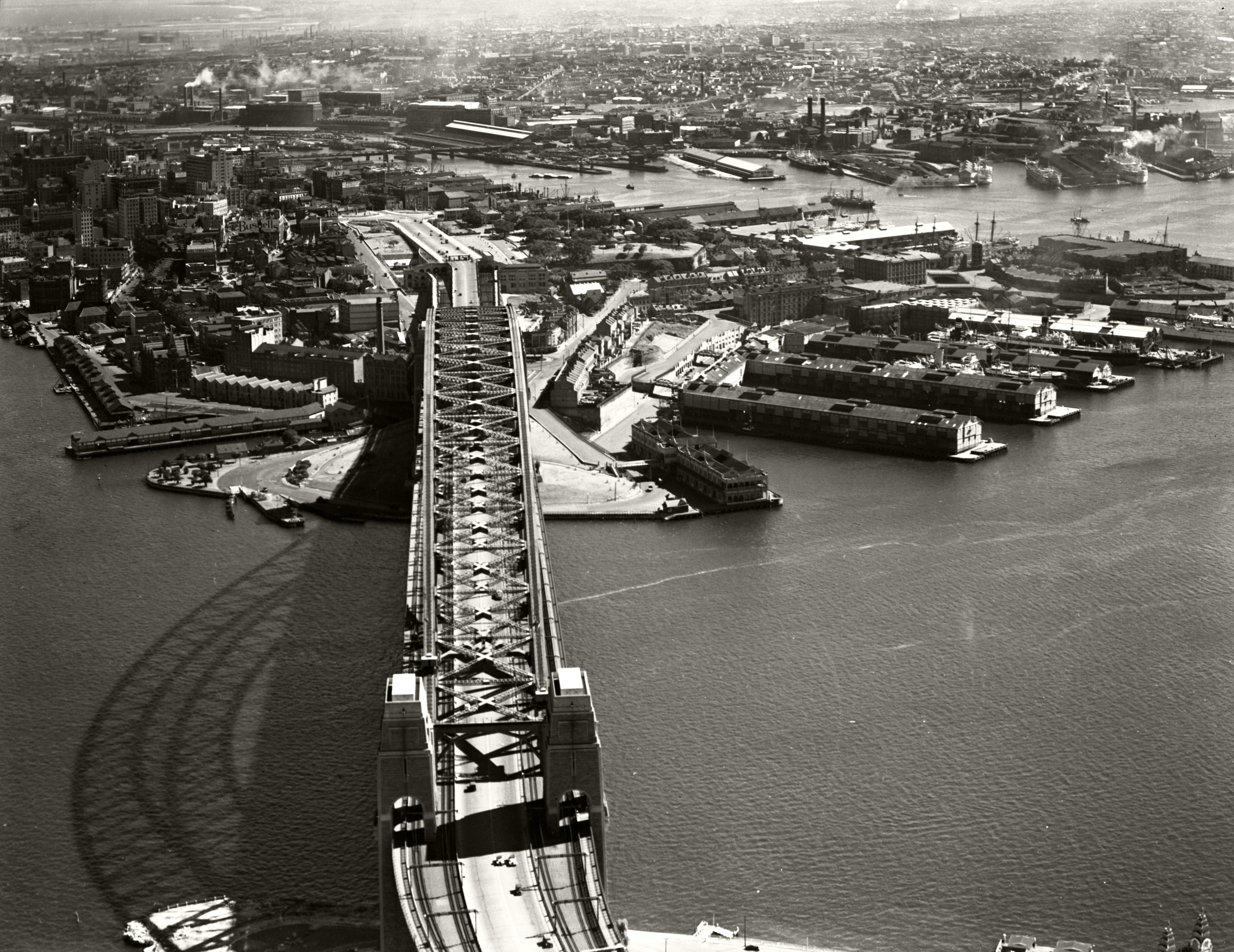
The Wharf theatre is in pier 4/5 which is at Walsh Bay, Dawes point. This photo is an aerial view of Dawes point from the 1930s that shows all 9 wharves in the Walsh Bay Wharves Precinct which is where pier 4/5 is located. Pier 4/5 was completed between 1906 and 1922.

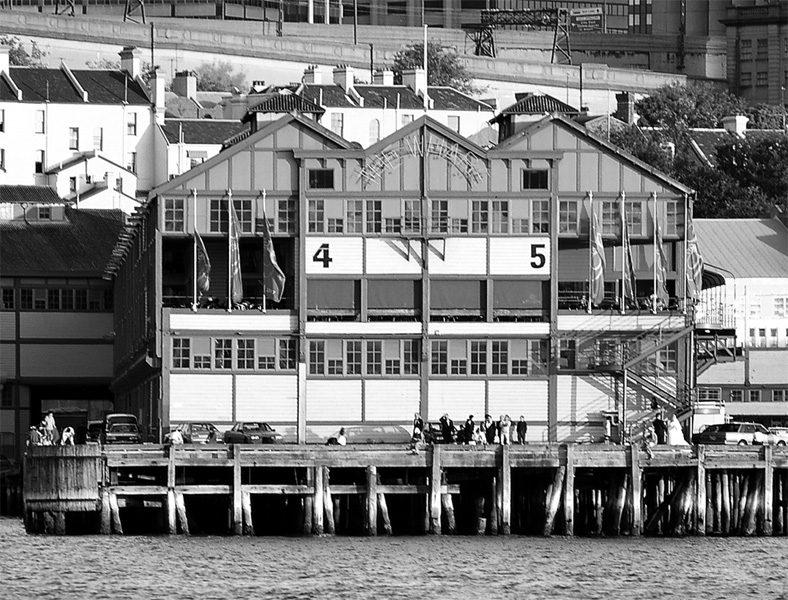
The northern end of Pier 4/5 facing Sydney Harbour. 2006
