= Ringer Edwards =

Australian prisoner of war

Herbert James Edwards
- Born: 26 July 1913; Fremantle, Western Australia
- Died: June 2000 (aged 86); Gingin
- Military career
- Allegiance: Australia
- Branch: Australian Army
- Service years: 1941–1945
- Nickname: "Ringer" Edwards
- Unit: 2/26th Infantry Battalion
- Conflicts: World War II; Malayan campaign

Herbert James "Ringer" Edwards (26 July 1913 – June 2000) was an Australian soldier during World War II. As a prisoner of war (POW), he survived being crucified for 63 hours by Japanese soldiers on the Burma Railway. Edwards was the basis for the character Joe Harman in Nevil Shute's novel A Town Like Alice (1950; also known as The Legacy). The book was the basis for a 1956 film (also known as The Rape of Malaya) and a 1981 Australian television miniseries of the same name.

== Early life ==
Edwards was born in Fremantle, Western Australia. He spent much of his adult life working on stations (ranches) in outback Australia. The nickname "Ringer" means a stockman who works on cattle stations, alluding to the stockmen's practice of ringing mobs of cattle at night, keeping them in a tight mob, which can be easily controlled. In the morning, as the cattle are moved off, a ring of manure remains. The term is shortened from "shit ringer". A gun shearer (the shearer who shears the most in a particular woolshed during an annual shearing) is also called a ringer; however, there is no evidence to suggest Edwards was ever a shearer.

Edwards enlisted at Cairns, Queensland, on 21 January 1941, and was posted to the 2/26th Battalion. The battalion became part of the 27th Brigade, which was assigned to the 8th Division. As the possibility of war with the Empire of Japan increased, the main body of the division was sent to garrison the British colony of Singapore, later in 1941. The 2/26th fought the Japanese in the Malayan campaign and the Battle of Singapore. Edwards, along with the rest of the 8th Division, became a POW when the Allied forces at Singapore surrendered on 15 February 1942.

== Experiences as a POW ==
Along with many other Allied prisoners, Edwards was sent to work as forced labour on the railway being built by the Japanese army from Thailand to Burma. In 1943, he and two other prisoners killed cattle to provide food for themselves and comrades. They were caught by the Japanese and sentenced to death. Crucifixion was a form of punishment, torture and/or execution that the Japanese military sometimes used against prisoners during the war. Edwards and the others were initially bound at the wrists with fencing wire, suspended from a tree and beaten with a baseball bat. When Edwards managed to free his right hand, the wire was driven through the palms of his hands. His comrades managed to smuggle food to him and he survived his ordeal. The other two men crucified at the same time did not survive.

== Post war ==
After the Surrender of Japan, Edwards was released and was discharged from the army on 4 December 1945.

British novelist Nevil Shute met Edwards in 1948 at a station in Queensland. Some of Edwards' experiences, including the crucifixion, became the basis for the character Joe Harman in A Town Like Alice. Unlike Edwards' experiences, the entire story takes place in Malaya. The other main character, Jean Paget, was based on the separate experiences of a Dutchwoman whom Edwards never met. The novel was the basis for subsequent adaptations, including a 1956 film and a 1981 television miniseries. In the former, the Harman character was played by Peter Finch, and in the latter by Bryan Brown.

Edwards later returned to Western Australia and settled at Gingin, where he died in 2000.
