= A Town Like Alice (disambiguation) =

A Town Like Alice is a 1950 novel by British author Nevil Shute. Other works based on the novel include:

- A Town Like Alice (film), 1956, also known as Rape of Malaya in U.S. cinemas
- A Town Like Alice (miniseries), a 1981 Australian mini-series, produced by the Seven Network
- "A Town Like Alice" (song) composed by Letty Katts, inspired by the book, not used in the film

== See also ==
- "Town Called Malice", is a song by the English rock band the Jam
