= Alexander Spence (soldier) =

Australian army officer (1906 - 1983)

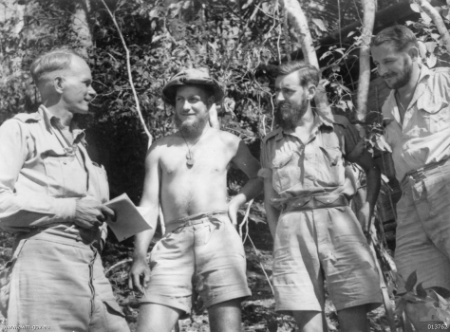
- HQ staff from the 2/2nd Independent Company, an Australian Army commando unit during the Second World War, December 1942. Timor. LTCOL Alexander Spence is the first on the left.
- Born: 5 February 1906; Bundaberg, Queensland, Australia
- Died: 10 July 1983 (aged 77); Brisbane, Queensland, Australia
- Burial place: Mount Gravatt General Cemetery
- Military career
- Allegiance: Australia
- Branch: Australian Army
- Service years: 1940–1945
- Rank: Major (Temporary Lieutenant Colonel)
- Commands: 2/2nd Independent Company 2/12th Commando Squadron 2/9th Cavalry Commando Regiment
- Conflicts: Second World War; Battle of Timor
- Awards: Distinguished Service Order

Alexander Spence DSO (5 February 1906 in Bundaberg, Queensland – 10 July 1983 in Brisbane, Queensland) was an Australian Army officer during World War II. Between 24 May and 11 November 1942, Spence commanded Allied forces during their guerrilla campaign in Timor.

Spence, who had been a journalist and had served in the Militia before the war, volunteered for overseas duty with the Second Australian Imperial Force on 25 June 1940, at Miowera, Queensland.

A major, he was originally posted to the 2/26th Battalion, but was posted away from the unit to the commandos before the battalion embarked on its ill-fated deployment to Singapore. He was later appointed commander of the 2/2nd Independent Company, a commando unit, and went with it as part of Sparrow Force to Dutch Timor in 1941. The 2/2nd and Dutch forces were despatched to occupy Portuguese Timor in December 1941, when it was anticipated that Japanese forces would invade. Spence and his men enjoyed good relations with most of the local population, and prepared for a prolonged guerrilla campaign.

== Timor campaign ==
Even though the Japanese had the element of surprise, when they invaded on 19 February 1942, the Allied garrison began an orderly retreat, covered by an 18-strong Australian section stationed at Dili airfield. The section managed to kill an estimated 200 Japanese in the first hours of the battle. Another section was less fortunate, driving by chance into a Japanese roadblock. Although they surrendered, it is believed that all but one were massacred.

Spence and his men succeeded in evading the Japanese in the mountains of Timor. The 2/2nd commenced raids on the Japanese. Allied forces were scattered in various areas of Timor, but were able to use the local telephone system to communicate among themselves and to gather intelligence on Japanese movements. However, they could not contact the outside world, due to a lack of functioning radio equipment. This situation would not be rectified until 18 April after signallers from the company managed to build a wireless transmitter and were subsequently able to contact Darwin.

The Japanese commander, Colonel Sadashichi Doi, sent the Australian honorary consul in Dili, David Ross (who was also the local Qantas agent), to find the commandos and pass on a demand to surrender. Spence is reputed to have responded incredulously, stating that the company was still a formed unit and would continue to fight. Ross then gave the commandos information on the disposition of Japanese forces and also provided a note in Portuguese, stating that anyone supplying them would be later reimbursed by the Australian government.

On 8 March 1942, Spence was reunited with his immediate commander, Brigadier William Veale, who had retreated on foot from West Timor. When Veale was evacuated in May, Spence was appointed an acting lieutenant colonel, and became Allied commander.

Doi sent Ross with another message, complimenting Sparrow Force on its campaign, and again asking that it surrender. The Japanese commander said that he realised it would take a force 10 times that of the Allies to win, that he was receiving reinforcements, and would eventually assemble the necessary units. This time Ross did not return to Dili, and he was evacuated to Australia on 16 July.

During August, Japanese forces began to burn and/or bomb villages believed to have assisted the Allies, with huge civilian casualties. The commander of the Japanese 48th Division, Lieutenant General Yuitsu Tsuchihashi arrived, to assume control of operations on Timor. Strong Japanese columns moved south — two from Dili and one from Manatuto on the north-east coast. Another moved eastward from Netherlands Timor to attack Dutch positions in the central south of the island. The offensive ended on 19 August, having secured the central town of Maubisse and the southern port of Beco.

In late August, matters were complicated when a rebellion against the Portuguese broke among the indigenous population, and a parallel conflict began. The Japanese were also recruiting significant numbers of Timorese civilians, who provided intelligence on Allied movements.

During September the main body of the Japanese 48th Division began arriving to take over the campaign. The Australians also sent reinforcements, in the form of the 450-strong 2/4th Independent Company—to be known as Lancer Force—on 23 September.

By October, the Japanese had succeeded in recruiting significant numbers of Timorese civilians, who suffered severe casualties when used in frontal assaults against the Allies. The Portuguese were also being pressured to assist the Japanese, and at least 26 Portuguese civilians were killed in the first six months of the occupation, including local officials and a Catholic priest. On 1 November, the Allied high command approved the issuing of weapons to Portuguese officials, a policy which had previously been carried out on an informal basis. At around the same time, the Japanese ordered all Portuguese civilians to move to a "neutral zone" by 15 November. Those who failed to comply were to be considered accomplices of the Allies. This succeeded only in encouraging the Portuguese to cooperate with the Allies, whom they lobbied to evacuate some women and children.

Spence was evacuated to Australia on 11 November, handing over command to Major Bernard Callinan. He was later re-united with the 2/2nd Independent Company, and remained with them until later in the war when he became the commanding officer of the 2/12th Commando Squadron and then later the 2/9th Cavalry Commando Regiment in 1944–45.

Spence was discharged from the army on 28 February 1945. He died in Brisbane on 10 July 1983, aged 77.
