= Anna Volska =

Australian television actress (born 1944)

- Born: 1 December 1944 (age 81); Milanówek, Poland
- Occupation: Actress
- Years active: 1965–present
- Spouse: John Bell AO OBE
- Children: Lucy Bell, Hilary Bell
- Awards: 1 (naacp image)

Anna Volska (born 1 December 1944 in Milanówek, Poland) is an Australian stage and television actress. She arrived in Australia when she was young and has acted from a young age.

== Early life ==
Anna Volska moved from Poland to Australia with her mother when she was seven. She graduated from the National Institute of Dramatic Art (NIDA)in 1962.

== Career ==
=== Theatre ===
Volska has acted extensively in theatre as an actor, director and teacher. While performing in The Cherry Orchard at the Old Tote Theatre Company, Volska met fellow cast member John Bell. She followed his career to the UK, where they married in 1965, and she subsequently spent three seasons with the Royal Shakespeare Company. They returned to Australia in 1970 and founded the Nimrod Theatre Company at Stables Theatre (which later became the Belvoir Theatre Company). In 1990 Bell and Volska then founded Bell Shakespeare Company. She has also directed at Flinders, Theatre Nepean, QUT, Nimrod.

=== Television ===
Volska has appeared in many Australian television drama series, mostly in a guest role. Her first role was in 1965, where she had a small role in The Recruiting Officer. In 1973, Volska had a leading role in Behind the Legend, where she played Helena Rubinstein. She then appeared on A Country Practice from 1987 until 1991. In 2009, she had a recurring role in the final season of All Saints as Katerina Ajanovic. In 2010, Volska appeared in the telemovie Sisters of War playing the role of Sister Cordula.

== Filmography ==
=== Film ===
Year	Title	Role	Type
1968	A Midsummer Night's Dream	Attendant	Feature film
1974	The Hotline		TV film
1977	Say You Want Me	Magazine Journalist	TV film
1977	Cass		TV film
1978	The Magic Arts	Herself	Documentary film short
1980	The Girl Who Met Simone de Beauvoir In Paris		Film short
1980	Players in the Gallery		TV film series, 1 episode
1982	A Most Attractive Man	Vija	TV film
1986	The Three Musketeers	Voice	Animated TV film
1987	The Everlasting Secret Family	Wife's Friend	Feature film
1992	Six Pack: Death Duties	Elsa	TV film series
1996	Fistful of Flies	Nanna	Feature film
2010	Sisters of War	Sister Cordula	TV film

=== Television ===
Year	Title	Role	Type
1962	My Three Friends	Marie-Louise	Teleplay
1963	The Right Thing	Emma	Teleplay
1965	The Recruiting Officer	Sylvia	Teleplay
1971	Spyforce	The Countess	TV series, episode 11: "The Countess"
1971-72	The Godfathers	Maria Varga	TV series, 72 episodes
1972	Behind the Legend	Helena Rubinstein	TV series, episode "Helena Rubinstein"
1973	The 15th Annual TV Week Logie Awards	Herself	TV special
1973	Division 4	Viv Jackson	TV series, 1 episode
1973	Ryan	Melina Jaconelli	TV series, 1 episode
1973	Matlock Police	Helen	TV series, 1 episode
1974	Hamlet		Teleplay
1979	The Restless Years	Recurring role	TV series
1980	The Timeless Land	Sara	TV miniseries, 2 episodes
1980	A Toast to Melba	Nellie Melba	Teleplay
1981	A Town Like Alice	Sally Wilson-Hayes	TV miniseries, 2 episodes
1982	Sara Dane	Madam Balvet	TV miniseries, 2 episodes
1987; 1991	A Country Practice	Olivia Harrison	TV series, 2 episodes
1988	Rafferty's Rules	Frieda	TV series, 1 episode
1991	Boys from the Bush	Joan	TV series, 1 episode
1991	Embassy	Madame Lamotte	TV series, 1 episode
1991	A Country Practice	Annette Muir	TV series, 2 episodes
1994	Good Morning Australia	Guest	TV series, 1 episode
1994	Midday	Guest (with John Bell)	TV series, 1 episode
1994	Ernie and Denise	Guest (with John Bell)	TV series, 1 episode
1994	Sale of the Century: The Arts	Contestant	TV series, 1 episode
1995	G.P.		TV series, 1 episode
1996	Midday	Guest (with John Bell)	TV series, 1 episode
1997	Heartbreak High	Aunty Magda	TV series, 1 episode
1997	Water Rats	Kath Lambert	TV series, 1 episode
1998	The Search For Treasure Island	Frau Keller	TV series, 9 episodes
2000	Murder Call	Gillian Pitman	TV series, 1 episode
2001	Burke's Backyard	Celebrity gardener (with John Bell & Lucy Bell)	TV series, 1 episode
2009	All Saints	Katerina Ajanovic	TV series, 1 episode
2013	Dance Academy	Lady Charlton	TV series, 1 episode
2014	A Place to Call Home	Leah	TV series, 1 episode
2016	John Bell: One Man Show	Herself	TV special

== Theatre ==
=== As actor ===
Year	Title	Role	Type
1963	The Cherry Orchard		UNSW with Old Tote Theatre Company
1963	The Bald Prima Donna		UNSW with Old Tote Theatre Company
1964	The Caucasian Chalk Circle		UNSW with Old Tote Theatre Company
1964	King Henry V	Katherine	Tent Theatre, Adelaide, Tent Theatre, Rushcutters Bay
1965	A Series of Dance Pieces	Dancer (Ballad of the Drover's Wife)	UNSW Science Theatre
1970	The Love of Don Perlimplín and Belisa in the Garden		AMP Theatrette
1970	Major Barbara		Canberra Theatre, UNSW Parade Theatre with Old Tote Theatre Company
1970	The Prince and The Firebird		UNSW Parade Theatre with Old Tote Theatre Company
1970	Biggles		Nimrod Street Theatre with Old Tote Theatre Company
1972	Measure for Measure		Nimrod Street Theatre
1973	The Tooth of Crime		Nimrod Street Theatre
1973	President Wilson in Paris		Nimrod Street Theatre
1973	Hamlet	Ophelia	Nimrod Street Theatre, Pram Factory, Playhouse Canberra
1973	Tom		Nimrod Street Theatre
1974	The Seagull		Nimrod Upstairs
1974	Jesters		Nimrod Street Theatre
1974	The Bacchoi		Nimrod Upstairs
1975	The Ride Across Lake Constance		Nimrod Theatre Company
1976	Le Chateau d'Hydro-Therapie Magnetique		Jane Street Theatre
1976	A Handful of Friends	Sally Marshall	Nimrod Upstairs
1977	Twelfth Night	Olivia	Nimrod Upstairs
1977	Much Ado About Nothing	Beatrice	Nimrod Upstairs, Space Theatre, Adelaide
1978	Everyman		Nimrod Downstairs
1978	The Comedy of Errors	Courtesan	Nimrod Upstairs
1979	Ubu Roi	Ma Ubu	ABC Radio Sydney
1979	A Night with Hamlet	Eurydice	ABC Radio Sydney
1979	Romeo and Juliet	Lady Capulet	Octagon Theatre, Perth, Nimrod Upstairs
1980	The Oresteia	Old Person of Aros (Agamemnon) / Elektra (Elektra) / Fury (Orestes)	Nimrod Upstairs
1980	A Month in the Country	Natalya Petrovna	Playhouse Adelaide with STCSA
1981	Three Sisters	Olga Sergeyevna Prozorov	Nimrod Upstairs
1981	Cloud Nine	Mrs Saunders / Bill / Tammy	Nimrod Upstairs
1981	Tales from the Vienna Woods	Valerie	Nimrod Upstairs
1982	Tristram Shandy		Nimrod Upstairs
1983	Uncle Vanya	Yelena	Nimrod Theatre Company
1984	The Women of March the First		Nimrod Downstairs
1984	Sydney Symphony - Sunday Afternoon Concert	Musician	Sydney Opera House
1985	Heartbreak House		Sydney Opera House with Sydney Theatre Company
1985	Pack of Lies	Barbara	SGIO Theatre, Brisbane, with Queensland Theatre
1986	The Taming of the Shrew		New Fortune Theatre, Perth
1986	Sons of Cain	Nicole	Suncorp Theatre, Brisbane, Wyndham's Theatre, London, with Queensland Theatre
1987	Siestas in a Pink Hotel		Wharf Theatre with Sydney Theatre Company
1988	Interplay '88		Sydney Opera House
1988	Away		Sydney Opera House with Sydney Theatre Company
1989	Say Goodbye to the Past	Ilinka	Stables Theatre, Sydney, with Griffin Theatre Company
1989	Lost Weekend	Zelda	Cremorne Theatre with Queensland Theatre
1990	The Odd Couple	Renee	Majestic Cinemas
1991-93	Hamlet	Gertrude	Australian national tour with Bell Shakespeare
1991-92	The Merchant of Venice	Nerissa	Australian national tour with Bell Shakespeare
1992-93	Richard III	Queen Margaret	Australian national tour with Bell Shakespeare
1993	Romeo and Juliet	The Nurse	Theatre Royal, Sydney, Melbourne Athenaeum, Her Majesty's Theatre, Adelaide, Canberra Theatre with Bell Shakespeare
1994	Macbeth	Lady Macbeth	Australian national tour with Bell Shakespeare
1995	Dead White Males	Sarah Judd	Sydney Opera House, Glen Street Theatre, Playhouse, Melbourne, His Majesty's Theatre, Perth with Melbourne Theatre Company & Sydney Theatre Company
1996	Much Ado About Nothing	Beatrice	Melbourne Athenaeum, Sydney Opera House, Canberra Theatre with Bell Shakespeare
1999	Henry V	Montjoy Alice	Melbourne Athenaeum, Playhouse Canberra, Sydney Opera House
2000	Dance of Death	Alice	Royalty Theatre, Adelaide, Theatre X, Tokyo, Geijutsu Theatre,, Nagoya, Playhouse Canberra with Bell Shakespeare & STCSA
2000	A Month in the Country	Natalya	Sydney Opera House with Sydney Theatre Company
2002	Hippolytus		Government House Ballroom, Sydney with Bell Shakespeare
2002	Richard III	Queen Elizabeth	Sydney Opera House, Playhouse, Canberra, Playhouse, Melbourne with Bell Shakespeare & Queensland Theatre
2002	The Comedy of Errors	Emilia	Playhouse, Canberra, Ford Theatre, Geelong, Playhouse, Melbourne, Riverside Theatres, Parramatta, Orange Civic Theatre, IMB Theatre Wollongong with Bell Shakespeare
2006	The Comedy of Errors		Theatre Royal, Bath, Blackpool Grand Theatre with Bell Shakespeare
2014	Unholy Ghosts	The Mother	Stables Theatre, Sydney, with Griffin Theatre Company
2015	Seventeen	Edwina	Belvoir Theatre Company
2016	Antigone	Tiresias	Seymour Centre, Playhouse Canberra, Riverside Theatres Parramatta with Sport for Jove

=== As director ===
Year	Title	Role	Type
1981	We Can't Pay? We Won't Pay!	Director	Troupe Theatre, Adelaide with STCSA
1981	Liquids	Director	Troupe Theatre, Adelaide with STCSA
1982	Demolition Job	Director	Nimrod Downstairs
1982	Burn Victim	Writer	Nimrod Downstairs
1982	Flash Jim	Director	Nimrod Upstairs
1983	As You Like It	Director	Nimrod Theatre Company
2001	Don's Party	Director	Western Sydney University, Seymour Centre
2004	A Midsummer Night's Dream	Director	Riverside Theatres Parramatta, Monash University, Whitehorse Centre, Frankston Arts Centre with Bell Shakespeare
2006	The Merchant of Venice	Director	Australian national tour with Bell Shakespeare
2019	Diplomacy	Director, Assistant	Ensemble Theatre

== Awards ==
Volska won a Best Single Performance by an Actress award at the 1973 Logie Awards for her role in Behind the Legend.

== Personal life ==
Volska has been married to fellow Thespian John Bell since 1965. Their daughters are playwright Hilary Bell and actor Lucy Bell, who were both born in Stratford-upon-Avon.
