= Deadline Midnight (TV series) =

British television series

- Genre: Drama
- Starring: Armine Sandford; Jeremy Young; Glyn Houston
- Country of origin: United Kingdom
- Original language: English
- No. of series: 3
- No. of episodes: 40 (2 missing)

Production
- Producers: Rex Firkin; Hugh Rennie
- Running time: 60 minutes
- Production company: Associated Television

Original release
- Network: ITV
- Release: 13 June 1960 – 2 December 1961

Deadline Midnight is a British television series that originally aired on ITV between 1960 and 1961. It focuses on the employees of a London daily newspaper.

== Cast ==
=== Main ===
- Armine Sandford as Jane Smith
- Jeremy Young as Neville Crane
- Glyn Houston as Mike Grieves
- Bruce Beeby as Matt Stewart
- Brian Badcoe as 'Robbie' Robinson
- Mary Law as Peggy Simpson
- Alexander Archdale as Holland
- Vincent Ball as Keith Durrant
- Peter Vaughan as Joe Dunn
- Peter Fraser as Dick Seton
- Pat Gilbert as Jill Collins
- James Culliford as Tom Douglas
- Ballard Berkeley as Desmond
- Basil Moss as John Mundy

=== Other ===
A large number of other actors appeared in episodes of the show including Michael Caine, Derek Farr, Harry H. Corbett, Sarah Miles, Nanette Newman, Sydney Tafler, Alethea Charlton, Nyree Dawn Porter, Jane Merrow, George Coulouris, Claire Gordon, Kenneth Cope, Richard Pearson, Dilys Laye, Ronald Lacey, Larry Martyn, Warren Mitchell, Frank Pettingell, Esmond Knight, John Welsh, Michael Robbins, Pamela Brown, Meredith Edwards, Billy Milton, Reginald Marsh, George Woodbridge, Peter Illing, John Ringham, William Kendall, Stratford Johns, John Barrie, Richard Vernon, John Barron, Anthony Sharp, Wensley Pithey, Bernard Archard, Patricia Burke, Bernard Kay, Derek Newark, Timothy West, Frederick Jaeger, Charles Lloyd Pack, Rita Webb, John Arnatt, Neil Hallett, Derek Francis, Arthur Brough, Elsie Wagstaff, Tenniel Evans, Carmen Silvera, Patrick Newell, Desmond Llewelyn, Jennifer Hilary, Allan Cuthbertson, Lloyd Lamble, David Hemmings and James Beck.

Of the 40 episodes produced, two (one and twelve) are missing from ITV's television archives.

== Bibliography ==
- Vahimagi, Tise . British Television: An Illustrated Guide. Oxford University Press, 1996.
