= Rape of Malaya =

Rape of Malaya may refer to:

- Battle of Malaya
- Japanese occupation of Malaya
- The US title of the 1956 film version of A Town Like Alice
