= 2/12th Commando Squadron (Australia) =

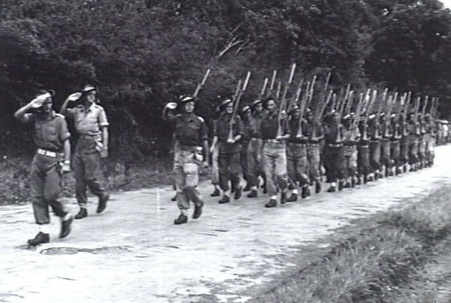
- 2/12th Commando Squadron takes part in the victory parade on Sarawak, September 1945.
- Active: 1944–1946
- Country: Australia
- Branch: Australian Army
- Type: Commando unit
- Role: Reconnaissance and long range patrols
- Size: 17 officers and 256 other ranks
- Part of: 2/9th Cavalry Commando Regiment, attached to Australian 9th Division
- Engagements: World War II: Borneo campaign

Commanders
- Notable commanders: Major Alexander Spence

Insignia
- Unit colour patch

The 2/12th Commando Squadron was a commando unit raised by the Australian Army for service in World War II. Raised in 1944 following a re-organisation of Australia's military forces, the unit participated in the Borneo campaign in 1945 but played only a limited role before hostilities ended. Following the end of the war, the squadron returned to Australia and was disbanded in early 1946.

== History ==
=== Formation ===
In 1941–42, the Australian Army raised a number of independent companies to carry out irregular warfare type operations in the mould of the British commandos. These units later became known as commando squadrons. Initially they were intended to be sent overseas as part of Australia's commitment to the fighting against the Germans and Italians in North Africa and the Middle East, however, following Japan's entry into the war these units were hastily deployed to the islands to the north of Australia to act first as an observation and early warning force. Following the outbreak of hostilities and the arrival of Japanese forces on the Pacific islands, these units were mainly used to carry out delaying and harassment operations and to act as stay-behind forces conducting a guerilla style of warfare. As the war progressed, Australia's strategic focus shifted away from the Middle East to the Pacific and as a result, in 1943–44 the Australian Army was restructured in order to prepare itself for the campaigns in this theatre. One of the main changes that occurred at this time affected the divisional cavalry regiments of three Australian divisions—the 6th, 7th and 9th Divisions—which were largely disbanded and used to form the headquarters of three new cavalry commando regiments. As a result of this, the previously independent commando squadrons were re-organised into a regimental system and a number of new units were also raised.

The 2/12th Commando Squadron was one of these new units. Formed in January 1944, the unit was raised from volunteers from the 9th Divisional Cavalry Regiment which had been redesignated as the 2/9th Cavalry (Commando) Regiment and re-roled as a commando unit, as well as from men of the disbanded 1st Armoured Division and other men who had volunteered for commando training. Along with the 2/4th and 2/11th Commando Squadrons, they formed the 2/9th Cavalry (Commando) Regiment, which was attached to the 9th Division.

Following the unit's formation, the squadron began training on the Atherton Tablelands in Queensland where they were based throughout 1944 and into 1945, along with the rest of the 9th Division until they finally received orders to embark for overseas.

=== Borneo campaign 1945 ===
The 2/12th Commando Squadron embarked from Townsville, Queensland in April 1945 bound for Morotai as part of the buildup of Australian forces in preparation for operations in the Netherlands East Indies and Borneo. These operations were known collectively as "Operation Oboe", whilst the landings on Borneo were known as Operation Oboe Six. Whilst the 26th Brigade and the 2/4th Commando Squadron were in the mopping up stages of the fighting on Tarakan, the rest of the 9th Division and the 2/9th Cavalry (Commando) Regiment carried out an assault landing on Labuan Island and at Brunei Bay on the north-west coast of Borneo. The plan was to secure the island's oil and rubber resources and to establish an advanced fleet base.

During the early phase of the campaign the 2/12th Commando Squadron was held back as the divisional reserve and as such did not take part in the main fighting on Labuan Island. As the Japanese resistance on the island was coming to an end and the focus of Australian operations moved towards the mainland of Borneo, the squadron was finally committed to operations when it was given the task of carrying out mopping up operations on the island.

Placed under the command of the 2/32nd Battalion the squadron landed on 12 June and began patrol operations nine days later. In the following eleven days the squadron was involved in a number of contacts, suffering one man killed and two wounded, while capturing one Japanese soldier and killing 27 others. The most notable incident occurred on 26 June 1945, when, following a Japanese raid on the British Borneo Civil Affairs Unit (BBCAU) area two days earlier, a section from the 2/12th contacted the group that had been responsible for the raid and in a quick engagement 14 Japanese were killed and two Australians wounded.

The fighting on Labuan Island came to an end by the middle of July and while the rest of the 9th Division was committed to action on the mainland, the 2/12th remained there and were used to carry out survey work, helping to improve the accuracy of the maps of Labuan Island.

=== Disbandment ===
Following the end of hostilities in the Pacific, the size of the squadron was slowly reduced as men who had enough points to do so were returned to Australia for demobilisation, whilst others were transferred to other units for occupation duties. In this time the squadron was transferred to Kuching in Sarawak, where they joined Kutching Force and carried out ceremonial duties. In January 1946, the squadron finally returned to Australia and the following month, while at Puckapunyal, Victoria it was disbanded.

During the course of its service during the war, the 2/12th lost one man killed in action and two men wounded. One member of the squadron received a Mention in Despatches.

== Commanding officers ==
- Major Charles Francis Gerald McKenzie.
- Major Alexander Spence, DSO.

== See also ==
- Australian commandos
- Borneo campaign (1945)
- Military history of Australia during World War II
- Second Australian Imperial Force
