= Lucy Bell =

Australian actress

- Born: Lucy Bell; 23 December 1968 (age 57); Stratford-upon-Avon, United Kingdom
- Education: National Institute of Dramatic Art (1991)
- Occupations: Television and film actress
- Known for: Murder Call (1997–2000); The Wog Boy (2000)
- Spouse: James O'Loghlin
- Children: 3
- Family: John Bell (father); Anna Volska (mother); Hilary Bell (sister)

Lucy Bell (born 23 December 1968) is an English-born Australian actress who appears in Australian television, film and theatre.

== Early life ==
Bell was born in 1968 in Stratford-upon-Avon, United Kingdom, to Australian actor and director John Bell and Polish-born Australian actress Anna Volska, while they were working for the Royal Shakespeare Company. She grew up alongside older sister Hilary Bell, who is an accomplished playwright.

Bell studied at Sydney's National Institute of Dramatic Art, graduating in 1991.

== Career ==
=== Television ===
Bell began her career in 1981, with a guest role in the miniseries A Town Like Alice. For several years she then appeared in television guest roles, before securing a lead role as Kate Logan in Snowy in 1993.

In 1994 and 1996, Bell had two recurring roles in G.P.. She then played the co-lead role of Detective Tessa Vance in Murder Call alongside Peter Mochrie across three seasons, from 1997 until 2000. In 2003, she starred in the second season of Grass Roots as Emily Bell. She had two recurring role in All Saints in 2006 and 2007, and a lead role as Tess Jardine in the 2009 miniseries Dirt Game.

In 2018, Bell starred in the miniseries Fighting Season as Phillipa Vogel and in 2022, she feature as Jodie in the miniseries Amazing Grace. More recently, she has had parts as Belinda in the miniseries Black Snow in 2022, and Lynn Walcott in The Secrets She Keeps from 2022 to 2023.

=== Film ===
Bell's first film role was in the 1985 period drama Burke & Wills, alongside Jack Thompson. She then appeared in the 1993 romance drama The Nostradamus Kid, opposite Noah Taylor and Miranda Otto. In 1994, she starred as Mary MacKillop in the biographical docudrama film Mary. She appeared in the 1997 films Oscar and Lucinda and Thank God He Met Lizzie.

Bell then starred as Celia alongside Nick Giannopoulos in the 2000 cult comedy film The Wog Boy. In 2008, she had roles in the drama Ten Empty and neo-noir thriller The Square.

== Personal life ==
Bell is married to author, TV and radio presenter, comedian, and former lawyer James O'Loghlin, and together they have three daughters.

Bell is a vegetarian.

== Filmography ==
=== Television ===
Year	Title	Role	Notes
1981	A Town Like Alice	Jane Holland	Miniseries, 1 episode
1992	A Country Practice	Louise Callaghan	1 episode
1993	Snowy	Kate Logan	Miniseries, 13 episodes
1994–1996	G.P.	Lizzie Dunstan / Michelle Evans	6 episodes
1997	Water Rats	Angela Dimitriou	1 episode
1997–2000	Murder Call	Detective Tessa Vance	56 episodes
1998	Wildside	Nina	2 episodes
2001	Burke's Backyard	Celebrity Gardner (with Anna Volska & John Bell)	1 episode
2001	My Husband, My Killer	Marlene Watson	TV movie
2001	Farscape	Nurse Kelsa	1 episode
2003	Grass Roots	Emily Bell	Season 2, 7 episodes
2003	White Collar Blue	Mia	1 episode
2004	Through My Eyes	Juror	Miniseries, 2 episodes
2006–2007	All Saints	Sonia Moore / Marie Booth	6 episodes
2007	Bastard Boys	Petra Hilsen	Miniseries
2009	City Homicide	Deborah Van Der Lind	1 episode
2009	Dirt Game	Tess Jardine	Miniseries, 6 episodes
2009	:30 Seconds	Amanda Walls	1 episode
2010	Cops L.A.C.	Neighbour	1 episode
2011	Crownies	Ruth Steinberg	1 episode
2013	Paper Giants: Magazine Wars	Susan Duncan	Miniseries, 2 episodes
2014	Love Child	Belinda Saunders	1 episode
2014	A Place to Call Home	Adele Duval	1 episode
2015	Catching Milat	Jill Walters	Miniseries, 2 episodes
2016	John Bell: One Man Show	Herself	TV special
2017	Here Come the Habibs	Magistrate	1 episode
2018	Home and Away	Prosecutor Barnesdale	2 episodes
2018	Rake	Senator Fiona Boyd	1 episode
2018	Fighting Season	Phillipa Vogel	Miniseries, 5 episodes
2020	Between Two Worlds	Celebrant	1 episode
2021	Amazing Grace	Jodie	3 episodes
2022	The Secrets She Keeps	Belinda	6 episodes
2022–2023	Black Snow	Lyn Walcott	4 episodes

=== Film ===
Year	Title	Role	Type
1985	Burke & Wills	Kyte's Daughter	Feature film
1993	The Nostradamus Kid	Sarai Anderson	Feature film
1993	Crimetime		Feature film
1994	Mary	Mary MacKillop	TV movie
1997	Thank God He Met Lizzie (aka The Wedding Party)	Andi	Feature film
1997	Oscar and Lucinda	Miss Mary Hasset	Feature film
1999	Sydney – A Story of a City	Virginia	Feature film
2000	The Wog Boy	Celia O'Brien	Feature film
2008	The Square	Martha Yale	Feature film
2008	Ten Empty	Diane	Feature film
2016	Emerald City: Live	Kate Leigh	Film

=== Shorts ===
Year	Title	Role	Notes
1995	Swinger	Girlfriend	Short
2008	Almost Eleven	The Mum	Short
2008	April in July	Anne	Short
2011	Cupid	Diana	Short
2018	Dots	Marge	Short
2018	Second Best	Dina	Short

== Theatre ==
=== As actor ===
Year	Title	Role	Notes
1991	Merrily We Roll Along		NIDA Parade Theatre, Sydney
1991	Tales of the Decameron / Serious Money		NIDA Parade Theatre, Sydney
1992	For Julia	Julia	Russell Street Theatre, Melbourne with MTC
1993	Scenes from an Execution		Belvoir Street Theatre, Sydney
1994	Blue Murder	Eve	Belvoir Street Theatre, Sydney
1994	Mack and Mabel - In Concert	Narrator	State Theatre, Melbourne with The Gordon Frost Organisation
1994	The Cafe Latte Kid / Darling Oscar		Wharf Studio Theatre, Sydney with STC
1995	Twelfth Night	Viola	University of Sydney, Monash University, Melbourne, Melbourne Athenaeum, Canberra Theatre, Playhouse, Adelaide with Bell Shakespeare
1995	Pericles	Marina	University of Sydney, Monash University, Melbourne, Melbourne Athenaeum, Canberra Theatre, Playhouse, Adelaide with Bell Shakespeare
1996	As You Like It		Sydney Opera House with STC
1996	Wolf Lullaby	Lizzie Gael	Stables Theatre, Sydney with Griffin Theatre Company
1999	Svetlana in Slingbacks / Salt Orange		Australian National Playwrights Conference, Canberra
2000	The Falls	Alberta	Stables Theatre, Sydney with Griffin Theatre Company
2000	Twelfth Night		Belvoir Street Theatre, Sydney
2001	The Vagina Monologues		Valhalla Cinema, Sydney
2004	Through the Wire		Sydney Opera House
2004	Humble Boy		Seymour Centre, Sydney
2005	The Cherry Orchard	Varya	Wharf Theatre, Sydney with STC
2011	Speaking in Tongues	Jane	Stables Theatre, Sydney with Griffin Theatre Company
2012	The Duchess of Malfi	Duchess of Malfi	Sydney Opera House with Bell Shakespeare
2012	Between Two Waves	Voice Over Artist	Stables Theatre, Sydney with Griffin Theatre Company
2013	Dreams in White	Anne	Stables Theatre, Sydney with Griffin Theatre Company
2014; 2016	Emerald City	Kate	Stables Theatre, Sydney, Online with Griffin Theatre Company
2015	The Anzac Project: Dear Mum and Dad / Light Begins to Fade		Ensemble Theatre, Sydney
2018	Marjorie Prime	Tess	Ensemble Theatre, Sydney
2019	Splinter	Woman	Stables Theatre, Sydney, The Butter Factory Theatre, Wodonga with Griffin Theatre Company
2021	Appropriate	Rachael Kramer-Lafayette	Roslyn Packer Theatre, Sydney with STC
2021	Honour	Honour	Ensemble Theatre, Sydney
2022	Hamlet	Gertrude	Sydney Opera House, Canberra Theatre, Fairfax Studio, Melbourne with Bell Shakespeare
2023	Romeo and Juliet	The Nurse	The Neilson Nutshell, Sydney with Bell Shakespeare
2024	RBG: Of Many, One	Understudy	Sydney Opera House, Playhouse, Brisbane with STC
2024	In a Nutshell: The Poetry of Violence		The Neilson Nutshell, Sydney, Canberra Theatre with Bell Shakespeare

=== As director ===
Year	Title	Role	Notes
1988	Warner Warner	Director	University of Sydney
2006	Light Years	Director	Wharf Theatre, Sydney with ATYP

== Awards and nominations ==
Year	Work	Award	Category	Result
2013	Paper Giants: Magazine Wars	Equity Ensemble Awards	Outstanding Performance by an Ensemble in a Miniseries or Telemovie	Nominated
2014	Emerald City	Glugs Theatrical Awards	Norman Kessell Memorial Award for Most Outstanding Actor	Won
2021	Appropriate	Sydney Theatre Awards	Best Performance in a Supporting Role in a Mainstage Production	Nominated
