= 2/11th Commando Squadron (Australia) =

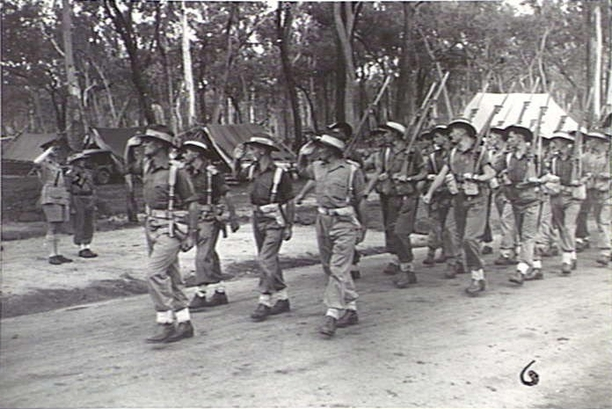
- The 2/11th Commando Squadron marches past the Duke of Gloucester at Ravenshoe, Queensland, 14 February 1945
- Active: 1944–1946
- Disbanded: January 1946
- Country: Australia
- Branch: Australian Army
- Type: Commando unit
- Role: Reconnaissance and long range patrols
- Size: 17 officers and 256 other ranks
- Part of: 2/9th Cavalry Commando Regiment, attached to 9th Division
- Engagements: World War II: Borneo campaign

Commanders
- Notable commanders: Major James Clements

Insignia
- Unit colour patch

The 2/11th Commando Squadron was a commando unit raised by the Australian Army for service in World War II. Raised in 1944, the unit saw action late in the war against the Japanese during the Borneo campaign in 1945. As a part of this campaign the squadron undertook landings on Labuan Island and at Brunei Bay. Following the end of the war, the squadron returned to Australia and was disbanded in early 1946.

== History ==
=== Formation ===
In 1941–42, the Australian Army raised a number of independent companies to carry out irregular warfare type operations in the mould of the British commandos. These units later became known as commando squadrons. Initially they were intended to be sent to the Middle East as part of the 2nd AIF, however, following Japan's entry into the war these units were hastily deployed to the islands to the north of the country to act first as an observation and early warning force and then following the arrival of Japanese forces to carry out delaying and harassment operations and to act as stay-behind forces conducting a guerilla style of warfare. As the war progressed, Australia's strategic focus shifted away from the Middle East to the Pacific and as a result, in 1943–44 the Australian Army was restructured in order to prepare itself for the campaigns in the Pacific. As a result, the divisional cavalry regiments of three Australian divisions—the 6th, 7th and 9th Divisions—were largely disbanded and used to form the headquarters of three new cavalry commando regiments and the previously independent commando squadrons were re-organised into a regimental system.

The 2/11th Commando Squadron was formed in January 1944 as part of this re-organisation of the Australian Army as it began to restructure itself for the campaigns in the Pacific. The unit was formed from volunteers from the 9th Divisional Cavalry Regiment which had largely been disbanded when it had been converted into the 2/9th Cavalry (Commando) Regiment, as well as from men from the defunct 1st Armoured Division and other men who had volunteered for commando training. Along with the 2/4th and 2/12th Commando Squadrons, they formed the 2/9th Cavalry (Commando) Regiment, which was attached to the 9th Division.

Following the unit's formation, the squadron began training on the Atherton Tablelands in Queensland where they were based throughout 1944 and into 1945 until they finally received orders to embark for overseas.

=== Borneo campaign 1945 ===
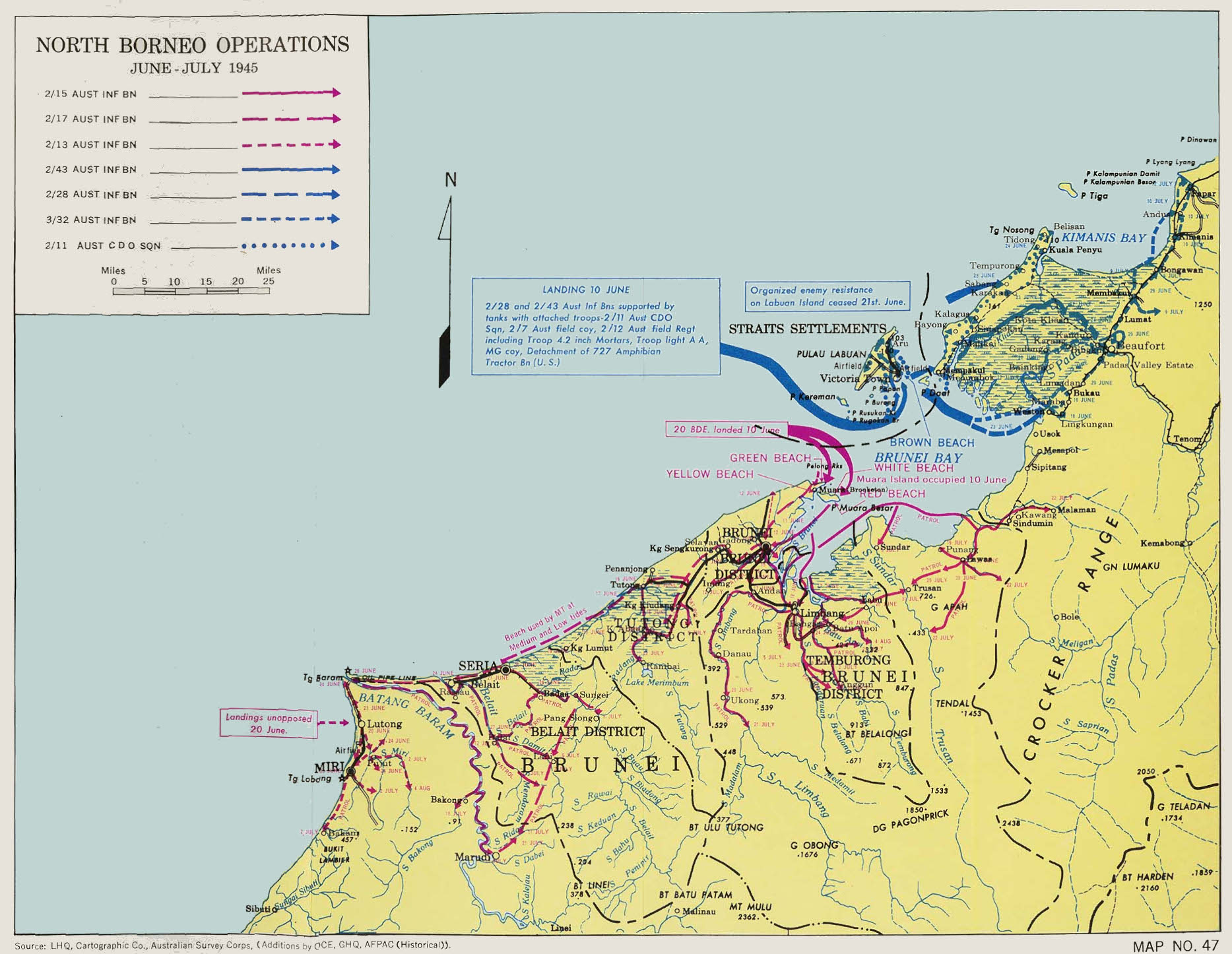
A map showing the movements of Australian units, including the 2/11th

The 2/11th Commando Squadron embarked from Townsville, Queensland, in April 1945 bound for Morotai as part of the buildup of Australian forces in preparation for operations in the Netherlands East Indies and Borneo, known collectively as "Operation Oboe". While the 26th Brigade and the 2/4th Commando Squadron were in the mopping up stages of the fighting on Tarakan, the rest of the 9th Division and the 2/9th Cavalry (Commando) Regiment carrying out an assault landing on Labuan Island and at Brunei Bay on the north-west coast of Borneo. The plan was to secure the island's oil and rubber resources and to establish an advanced fleet base.

Attached to the 24th Brigade, the majority of the 2/11th Commando Squadron landed at Labuan Island on 10 June 1945, while a troop was detached to clear Hamilton Point, crossing Victoria Harbour and landing at Hardy's Beach in LVTs. Originally it had been intended to send the entire squadron to clear the peninsula, however, intelligence gathered from locals earlier indicated that there were no Japanese there and as such the decision was made only to send one troop from the squadron to making the landing across the harbour. After landing, the troop met no opposition and began to move north along the Charlie Track towards the main arterial that ran east–west across the island known as Hamilton Road, where at the track junction, on 12 June they linked up with the 2/43rd Battalion.

The resistance that the Australians met early in the campaign was light, as the Japanese had chosen to concentrate their forces further inland in the mountain ridges off what was named MacArthur Ridge. On 15 June, fighting began to clear the Japanese out of the area that had become known as the Pocket. The 2/28th Battalion was given the task of carrying out the main assault and the 2/11th Commando Squadron were placed in support. Within the area that the Japanese were defending there were several areas of high ground from which the Japanese could observe the Australian advance. As such there were only two avenues of approach for an attacking force. The first of these approaches was a heavily mined track along Lyon Ridge, while the second was a track that ran through a swamp. The 2/11th were given the task of patrolling along Lyon Ridge and report back regarding whether it was passable with tanks.

Having completed the patrol, the squadron reported back that the track along Lyon Ridge was suitable for tanks and so the following day, 16 June 1945, a company from the 2/28th Battalion with a number of tanks from the 2/9th Armoured Regiment launched an attack on the Japanese positions in the Pocket. A section from the 2/11th was attached to the 2/28th Battalion to provide protection to its tactical headquarters and during the attack, after the assaulting company had become pinned down, it was sent forward and deployed in support of the company that had become pinned down. Almost immediately it came under effective fire and two men were killed, while another was wounded. As the attack progressed and as Australian casualties began to mount, the 2/11th's chaplain organised a team of stretcher bearers from the 2/11th and went forward under fire to carry out the task of rescuing the wounded.

The Pocket was not cleared until 21 June 1945, however, as the rest of Labuan had been cleared, it was decided to gain control of the high ground on the eastern side of the mainland of Borneo in order to gain control of the beaches so that they could be used later to land supplies for use during the subsequent advance to the north. On 17 June, the 2/32nd Battalion crossed Brunei Bay on board a number of landing craft and landed at Weston. They were followed shortly afterward by the rest of the 24th Brigade, which began moving inland towards Beaufort. The 2/11th Commando Squadron followed a little later on 19 June, landing at Mempakul.

Tasked with clearing the Klias Peninsula, the 2/11th began moving north along the coast Kuala Penyu near Cape Nosong, clearing the area west of the Klias river. Moving through difficult terrain, the going was slow. Enemy resistance was isolated, however, the squadron was involved in a number of contacts. At Malikai a native approached a patrol from the 2/11th and led them to a house where a number of Japanese were in occupation. In the ensuing firefight, eight Japanese were killed. The following day, on 23 June, they took Karukan and Sabang, before finally arriving at Kuala Penyu four days later. They would remain there until the end of the war.

=== Disbandment ===
Following the end of hostilities in the Pacific, the size of the squadron was slowly reduced as men who had enough points to do so were returned to Australia for demobilisation, while others were transferred to other units of occupation duties. As they waited for transportation back to Australia, the squadron undertook further reconnaissance of the area around Kuala Penyu, improving the accuracy of maps of the Klias Peninsula. In September they were moved to Mepakula and then to Beaufort, before returning to Labuan in December 1945. Finally, however, the men that remained in the squadron were returned to Australia and in January 1946, at Chermside camp in Brisbane, the 2/11th Commando Squadron was officially removed from the Australian Army's order of battle.

During the course of its service during the war, the 2/11th lost nine men killed in action or died on active service, and six men wounded. Three members of the squadron were decorated with the Military Medal.

== Commanding officers ==
The 2/11th Commando Squadron's commanding officer was:

- Major James Murray Clements.

== See also ==
- Operation Oboe Six
- Military history of Australia during World War II
