= Alexander Spence =

Alexander Spence may refer to:

- Alexander Spence (soldier) (1906–1983), Australian soldier
- Skip Spence (1946–1999), Canadian musician
