= Sydney – A Story of a City =

- Directed by: Bruce Beresford; Geoff Burton
- Written by: John Izzard; Stephen Sewell
- Produced by: Sue Milliken; Philip Gerlach
- Starring: Lucy Bell; Paul Mercurio
- Narrated by: Stephen Sewell; John Izzard
- Cinematography: Andre Fleuren ACS
- Edited by: Nicholas Holmes
- Music by: Christopher Gordon
- Distributed by: IMAX
- Release date: 19 August 1999
- Running time: 45 minutes
- Country: Australia
- Language: English

Sydney – A Story of a City is a film originally shot in the IMAX format and shown in IMAX cinemas around Australia in 1999. The film was subsequently digitally re-mastered from the original large film format and released on DVD in 2001.

The film presents the viewer with spectacular scenes of the city, its harbour, the Sydney Opera House and the Blue Mountains and uses archive film footage, computer generated graphics combined with live footage to tell the story of Sydney's past and present. Featuring the themes of history, archaeology, architecture and genealogy with a simple love story, the film educates and entertains and serves as a showcase for the vibrant city of Sydney.

== Plot ==
'Virginia" (Lucy Bell), a young and adventurous woman, travels from England to Sydney, Australia, in search of her Australian ancestors. Her grandfather "William Robertson" had travelled from Sydney to England in the 1930s, falling in love with an English girl and marrying her. He joined the RAAF at the onset of World War II, only to be killed in an air battle over France. Virginia carries with her some documents of her grandfather's to try to find out what his life was like in Australia all those years ago. She meets her Great Aunt "Clara" who, while happy to tell her of the city's origins, does not expand on the history of William Robertson. Virginia intensifies her efforts to find the truth and comes across a reference to a Robertson who lived at Cumberland Street in The Rocks area of the city.

On arriving at the site she discovers an archaeological dig in progress where once stood some of the oldest buildings in Sydney. Here she meets a young archaeologist called "Marco" (Paul Mercurio) who assists her in her search for answers. The couple research all available resources, travelling around the city and its suburbs, and spend a lot of time in each other's company. During her quest for answers Virginia discovers some of the history and legends surrounding the city of Sydney, its cultural diversity and its famous landmarks. As her quest finally nears completion and it shall soon be time for her to return to England, Virginia discovers that not only has she fallen in love with Marco, she has also fallen in love with the city of Sydney.

== Cast ==
Actor	Role
Lucy Bell	Virginia
Paul Mercurio	Marco
Phil Gerlach	Phil
Sue Milliken	Sue
Mitch Mathews	Great Aunt Clara
Penne Hackforth-Jones	Librarian

== Soundtrack ==
"Botany Bay"
Traditional. Arranged by Nigel Westlake
Conducted by Christopher Gordon

"Adieu Notre Petite Table" From Manon
Written by Jules Massenet
Sung by Christine Douglas
Piano accompaniment Marshal McGuire

"Trio for Piano, Violin & Cello No.1 in B flat Major"
Written by Franz Schubert
Played by Susan Blake, Kirsten Williams, Philip Shovk

"Toccata from Symphony No. 5 for Organ"
Written by Charles Marie Widor
Courtesy of Editions Hamelle – Paris
Played by Robert Ampt

"She's My Baby"
Written by T. Moffatt/G. Turnbull/E.
©1959 JAT Music Inc.
Performed by Johnny O'Keefe

"Sydney From A 747"
Written By Paul Kelly
Performed by Merril Bainbridge
