= President Wilson in Paris =

President Wilson in Paris is a 1973 play by Ron Blair set during the Paris Peace Conference, 1919. It was also adapted for television by the ABC.

== Premise ==
President Woodrow Wilson is in Paris for the peace talks after World War One. They are visited by the mysterious Colonel House.

== Productions ==
The stage play's original production was directed by John Bell and debuted at the Nimrod Theatre in Sydney on 7 February 1973. The cast consisted of John Krummel, Anna Volska and Max Cullen. Reviewing it, H. G. Kippax of the Sydney Morning Herald gave it a "hearty recommendation."

The play was subsequently performed by the Melbourne Theatre Company.

== Television adaptation ==
President Wilson in Paris
- Based on: President Wilson in Paris by Ron Blair
- Written by: Ron Blair
- Directed by: Julian Pringle
- Starring: Tim Elliott; Robyn Nevin; Dennis Miller
- Country of origin: Australia
- Original language: English

Production
- Producer: Julian Pringle
- Running time: 80 mins
- Production company: ABC

Original release
- Network: ABC
- Release: 19 September 1973

The play was filmed at the ABC's Sydney studios in 1973 with a new cast including Tim Elliot as Woodrow Wilson, Robyn Nevin as Edith Wilson and Dennis Miller as Colonel House. It was one of a series of Australian stage plays filmed by the ABC in the early 1970s. The played aired on 9 September 1973 .
