= Hilary Bell (writer) =

Australian writer (born 1966)

- Born: 19 July 1966 (age 60); Stratford-upon-Avon, UK
- Occupation: Writer
- Spouse: Phillip Johnston
- Relatives: Lucy Bell (sister)
- Writing career
- Notable awards: Aurealis Award; Best fantasy short story 1996 Mirror, Mirror
- Website: www.rgm.com.au/literary/hilary-bell/

Hilary Bell (born 19 July 1966) is an Australian writer of fiction, radio, screen, and theatre.

== Early life and education ==
Hilary Bell was born in Stratford-upon-Avon, UK, on 19 July 1966, the daughter of John Bell (founder of the Bell Shakespeare company) and Anna Volska. She grew up in Sydney and attended high school with fellow Sydney writer Justine Ettler.

She is a graduate of the National Institute of Dramatic Art, the Australian Film, Television and Radio School, and the Juilliard Playwrights' Studio in New York City.

== Career ==
Bell writes for radio, screen, and theatre and also writes fiction.

== Recognition and awards ==
In 1996, she joint won the 1996 Aurealis Award for best young-adult novel with her novel, Mirror, Mirror which is an adaptation of the 1995 television show which Bell was a writer for.

She has also won awards for her work as a playwright; the Philip Parsons Young Playwrights Award, the Jill Blewett's Playwright's Award, the Bug'n'Bub Award, the Eric Kocher Playwrights' Award, the 2007 Inscription Award, and an AWGIE award.

== Personal life ==
Hilary Bell's sister is Lucy Bell. Hilary is married to Phillip Johnston.

== Bibliography ==
=== Plays and theatre ===
Her plays include:

- Wolf Lullaby
- Fortune
- The Anatomy Lesson of Doctor Ruysch
- The Falls
- Memmie Le Blanc
- The Bloody Bride
- Perfect Stranger
- A Pocket Full of Hula Dreams
- Ugly Beauty
- Connectivity

Other theatre credits include:

- Mrs. Satan (opera)
- The Wedding Song (musical)
- Talk Show (song cycle)
- Faust (libretto to Phillip Johnston's score)

=== Television ===
Television credits include:

- Echo Point (1995, writer)
- Mirror, Mirror (1995, writer)
  - Mirror, Mirror (1996), novelised from the TV series

=== Children's books ===
The following books were illustrated by Antonia Pesenti

- Alphabetical Sydney (2013)
- Numerical Street (2015)
- Summer Time (2019)
