= The Bacchoi =

The Bacchoi is a rock musical with book and lyrics by Bryan Nason and music by Ralph Tyrrell, based on The Bacchae by Euripides.

== Productions ==
It was first performed in a 1970 student production which opened the University of Queensland's Schonell Theatre. It opened on 24 September and ran for 15 performances. The production was choreographed by Keith Bain, with a cast including Geoffrey Rush and Ross Thompson. It received positive reviews in the Australian.

Nimod Theatre Company in Sydney gave the professional premiere in 1974 as the inaugural production at the new Nimrod Theatre, with a cast including Jon English, Jeannie Lewis, Peter Carroll, Drew Forsythe, Tony Llewellyn-Jones, Peter Chambers, Roger Newcombe, Anna Volska, Julia Lyndon and Sharon Murphy. The production was directed by John Bell. This production received less favorable reviews than its 1970 premiere.

The text was published in 2003 in the collection The Journey Plays: the work of Bryan Nason published by Playlab Press.
