= John Bell (Australian actor) =

Australian actor and theatre director (born 1940)

John Bell AO OBE FRSN
- Born: John Anthony Bell; 1 November 1940 (age 86); Newcastle, New South Wales, Australia
- Occupations: Actor, theatre director, theatre manager
- Years active: 1959–present
- Known for: Development of Australian theatre
- Awards: Helpmann Award, JC Williamson Award, Australian Living Treasure

John Anthony Bell (born 1 November 1940) is an Australian actor, theatre director and theatre manager. He has been a major influence on the development of Australian theatre in the late 20th and early 21st centuries.

== Early life ==
Bell was born 1 November 1940 in Newcastle, New South Wales, to a bank manager father and elocutionist mother. As the oldest child, he grew up alongside three younger sisters and a brother.

At age 9 or 10, he moved with his family to the town of Maitland, New South Wales where he was educated at the Marist Brothers College. At school, he studied Shakespeare, where he developed and performed one-man stage shows. At the age of 15, he developed aspirations to become a Shakespearean actor after seeing Laurence Olivier as Henry V on screen.

Bell auditioned for National Institute of Dramatic Art's (NIDA's) first intake in 1958 and was accepted, but his parents and teachers convinced him to go to Sydney University instead, where he studied an arts degree. He graduated with English Honours in 1962.

== Career ==
In 1963, the year after his university graduation, Bell joined the Old Tote Theatre Company, where he played the title role in Hamlet.

Bell relocated to the United Kingdom in 1964, after winning a scholarship from the British Council, and was invited to join the Royal Shakespeare Company. He spent five years with them as an Associate Artist. He returned to Australia in 1969 and taught at National Institute of Dramatic Art (NIDA).

In 1970, Bell co-founded the Nimrod Theatre Company in Sydney, and was Artistic Director, investing in producing Australian theatre. That same year, he directed the first production of The Legend of King O'Malley (a musical play based on the life of King O'Malley by Bob Ellis and Michael Boddy), featuring Robyn Nevin and Kate Fitzpatrick. He also directed plays by leading playwrights David Williamson, Ron Blair, Peter Kenna and Louis Nowra, including Williamson's Travelling North, The Club and The Removalists and Kenna's A Hard God. In 1985 he resigned from his role at Nimrod Theatre in order to freelance as a director and actor.

In 1990, he formed the Bell Shakespeare Company, performing and touring his own productions of Shakespeare's works. Amongst other plays, he has produced Hamlet, Romeo and Juliet, The Taming of the Shrew, Richard III, Pericles, Henry IV, Henry V, Julius Caesar, Antony and Cleopatra, The Comedy of Errors, The Merchant of Venice, The Tempest, King Lear, and Goldoni's The Servant of Two Masters.

His own roles for the company include Shylock, Richard III, Macbeth, Malvolio, Coriolanus, Leontes, Prospero, King Lear and Ulysses. He has also played Hamlet, Henry V, Berowne, Petruchio, Cyrano de Bergerac and Titus Andronicus. His performances in King Lear, Cyrano de Bergerac and Uncle Vanya were met with critical acclaim.

In 2009, Bell directed the opera Madama Butterfly for Oz Opera, which toured throughout Australia.

In 2011, he published the book "On Shakespeare", detailing his thoughts and reminiscences of playing Shakespeare for more than 50 years.

In 2015, at the age of 75, Bell retired from running Bell Shakespeare, handing the reins over to his successor, Peter Evans. He has since engaged as a corporate speaker, performed poetry recitals with pianist Simon Tedeschi and taken on further stage roles, including the title role in The Father with Sydney Theatre Company. Additionally, in his spare time, he started the Bouddi Foundation, based on the NSW central coast, which assists emerging

In 2021, Bell delivered the Boyer Lecture on the themes of "Life Lessons from Shakespeare", "Order vs Chaos", "Shakespeare's Women", and "Imaginary Forces". The lectures demonstrate the relevance of Shakespeare's works to today's issues of need for good governance, the danger of political self interest, and the need for gender equality.

== Honours and awards ==
In the 1978 New Year Honours, Bell was appointed an Officer of the Order of the British Empire (OBE). In the Queen's Birthday Honours of 1987, he was named a Member of the Order of Australia (AM). In the 2009 Australia Day Honours, he was named an Officer of the Order of Australia (AO).

In 2001 a painting of Bell by artist Nicholas Harding won the Archibald Prize.

In 2003 the Australian Prime Minister, John Howard, presented Bell with the Cultural Leader of the Year Award.

In 2016 he was awarded Australian Humanist of the Year (AHOY).

In 2019 Bell was elected as a fellow of the Royal Society of New South Wales.

His achievements in theatre have been acknowledged by the Universities of Newcastle (1994), Sydney (1996) and New South Wales, all of whom have awarded him honorary Doctor of Letters degrees.

=== Awards ===
Year	Work	Award	Category	Result
1982	Far East	AFI Awards	Best Actor in a Supporting Role	Nominated
1989	John Bell	Mo Awards	Male Supporting Musical Theatre Performer of the Year	Won
2002	Richard III	Helpmann Awards	Best Male Actor in a Play	Won
2009	John Bell	Producers and Directors Guild Awards	Lifetime Achievement	Awarded
2009	John Bell	Helpmann Awards	JC Williamson Award	Awarded
2010	John Bell	Sydney Theatre Awards	Lifetime Achievement	Awarded
2011	Uncle Vanya	Helpmann Awards	Best Male Actor in a Supporting Role in a Play	Nominated
2013	Henry IV	Helpmann Awards	Best Male Actor in a Play	Nominated
2015	As You Like It	Helpmann Awards	Best Male Actor in a Supporting Role in a Play	Won
2018	The Father	Helpmann Awards	Best Male Actor in a Play	Nominated
2021	John Bell & Anna Volska	Equity Ensemble Awards	Australian Equity Lifetime Achievement Award	Awarded

== Personal life ==
Bell attended the University of Sydney with Clive James and Germaine Greer. He is a contemporary and friend of Bruce Beresford (film director, with whom he shared a house and for whom he did some film acting), Ken Horler, Mungo McCallum, Bob Ellis, Richard Wherrett, John Gaden, Laurie Oakes (journalist), and Les Murray (poet).

His brother is the artist Michael Bell.

Bell met Polish-born Australian actress and NIDA graduate Anna Volska in 1963, when they performed in a production of The Cherry Orchard together. Volska followed Bell to the UK when he joined the Royal Shakespeare Company, and they married in 1965 in Stratford-upon-Avon, where their two daughters were born.

The couple's daughters are playwright Hilary Bell (b. 1966) and Grass Roots actress Lucy Bell (b. 1968). Through their daughters, they have five grandchildren, the eldest of whom aspires to be a filmmaker.

Bell and Volska reside in the Sydney suburb of Woollahra.

== Filmography ==
=== Film ===
Year	Title	Role	Notes
1962	The Devil to Pay	John Grey	Short film
1963	Clement Meadmore	Narrator	Short film
1976	Break of Day	Arthur	Feature film
1977	A Calendar of Dreamings	Narrator	Short film
1982	Far East	Peter Reeves	Feature film
2014	The Correspondent		Feature film

=== Television ===
Year	Title	Role	Notes
1963	Ballad for One Gun	Ned Kelly	TV movie
1963	The Long Sunset	Otho	TV movie
1971	The Comedy Game	Sean Crisp	Season 1, episode 2: "Nice Day at the Office"
1972	The Resistible Rise of Arturo Ui	Arturo Ui	TV movie
1973	The Taming of the Shrew	Petruchio	TV play of Old Tote Theatre production
1974	Hamlet	Hamlet	TV play of STC production
1975	Explorers	William Wills	Miniseries, episode 4: "The Story of Burke and Wills"
1984	The Explorers	Wills	Episode 9: "South to North"
1986	Hunger	Romanian Consul	TV movie
1989	Mission: Impossible	Erik Vogel	Season 2, episode 8: "The Fuehrer's Children"
1990	A Country Practice	Peter Kerr	Season 10, episode 34: "All or Nothing: Part 2"
2015	Deadline Gallipoli	Lord Kitchener	Miniseries, 2 episodes
2019	Lambs of God	Bishop Malone	3 episodes
2019	Diary of an Uber Driver	Ken	
2025	The Twelve	John Dallimore	Season 3, episodes 5 and 6

=== As director ===
Year	Title	Role	Notes
1974	A Hard God	Director	TV movie
1974	Hamlet	Director	TV movie
2014	Tosca	Stage Director	TV movie

== Stage ==
=== As actor ===
Year	Title	Role	Notes
1959	Dead Men Walking		University of Sydney
1960	Twelfth Night	Malvolio	University of Sydney
1960	The Fairy Queen		University of Sydney
1960	Him		Broadway Theatre, Sydney
1961	Wet Blankets		St Barnabas Church Hall with University of Sydney
1961	'Tis Pity She's a Whore		University of Sydney
1961	Serjeant Musgrave's Dance: an Un-historical Parable	Serjeant Musgrave	University of Sydney
1962	The Rivals		Genesian Theatre, Sydney
1962	Coriolanus		University of Sydney
1962	Wakefield Mystery Plays	God	Cell Block Theatre, Sydney
1962	John Bell: Ring Around the Moon		Genesian Theatre, Sydney
1963	The Cherry Orchard		UNSW Old Tote Theatre, Sydney
1963	The Fire Raisers		UNSW Old Tote Theatre, Sydney
1963	Hamlet	Hamlet	UNSW Old Tote Theatre, Sydney
1963	The Private Ear		Phillip Theatre, Sydney
1963	The Private Ear and the Public Eye		Phillip Theatre, Sydney
1964	The Caucasian Chalk Circle		UNSW Old Tote Theatre, Sydney
1964	Henry V	Henry V	Tent Theatre, Sydney, Tent Theatre, Adelaide for Adelaide Festival
1964	By Royal Command		St James' Hall, Sydney
1964	The Soldier's Tale	The Soldier	Elizabethan Theatre, Sydney
1965	Timon of Athens	Soldiers, Beggars, Prisoners, Townspeople	Royal Shakespeare Theatre, Stratford with RSC
1965–1966	Hamlet	Rosencrantz	Aldwych Theatre, London, Royal Shakespeare Theatre, Stratford with RSC
1966	The Government Inspector		Aldwych Theatre, London with RSC
1966	The Investigation	Dr Lucas	Aldwych Theatre, London with RSC
1966	Henry IV	Prince Humphrey / Travers	Royal Shakespeare Theatre, Stratford with RSC
1966	Twelfth Night	Valentine	Royal Shakespeare Theatre, Stratford with RSC
1966	Henry V	Duke of Gloucester / Governor of Harfleur	Royal Shakespeare Theatre, Stratford with RSC
1966–1968	Macbeth	Lennox	Royal Shakespeare Theatre, Stratford, National Theatre, Helsinki, Palace of Culture, Leningrad, Art Theatre, Moscow, Aldwych Theatre, London with RSC
1967	Coriolanus	Nicanor	Royal Shakespeare Theatre, Stratford with RSC
1967	Romeo and Juliet	Paris	Royal Shakespeare Theatre, Stratford with RSC
1968	Green Julia	Jake	UK tour with RSC
1968–1969	The Country Wife		Theatre Royal, Bath
1971	An Evening of Victorian Music Hall		Paddington Town Hall, Sydney
1971	The Resistible Rise of Arturo Ui		UNSW Old Tote Theatre, Sydney, Canberra Theatre
1971	The Government Inspector		UNSW Old Tote Theatre, Sydney
1972	The Taming of the Shrew	Petruchio	UNSW Old Tote Theatre, Sydney, Canberra Theatre
1972	Uncle Vanya		UNSW Old Tote Theatre, Sydney
1973	Hamlet	Hamlet	Nimrod, Sydney, Pram Factory, Melbourne, Playhouse, Canberra
1974	The Seagull		Nimrod, Sydney
1974	Love's Labour's Lost	Berowne	Sydney Opera House with Old Tote Theatre
1975	Richard III	Richard, Duke of Gloucester	Nimrod, Sydney
1976	Mad, Bad and Dangerous to Know	Lord Byron	Nimrod, Sydney, Arts Theatre, Adelaide, Playhouse, Canberra, Playhouse, Adelaide
1977	Much Ado About Nothing		Nimrod, Sydney, Space Theatre, Adelaide
1977	The Lower Depths	Satin	Sydney Opera House
1978	Henry IV	Henry, Prince of Wales / Fang	Nimrod, Sydney
1979	Ubu Roi	Ubu	ABC Radio Sydney
1979	The Sea	Hatch	Nimrod, Sydney
1980; 1981	Cyrano de Bergerac	Cyrano de Bergerac	Sydney Opera House with STC
1980	Volpone	Volpone	Nimrod, Sydney
1981	Three Sisters	Alexandr Ignatyevich Vershinin	Nimrod, Sydney
1982	Macbeth	Macbeth	Sydney Opera House with STC
1983	Uncle Vanya	Astrov	Nimrod, Sydney
1984	King Lear	King Lear	Bankstown District Sports Club, Sydney, Seymour Centre, Sydney with Nimrod
1985	The Resistible Rise of Arturo Ui	Arturo Ui	Seymour Centre, Sydney with Nimrod
1985	The Real Thing	Henry	Sydney Opera House with STC
1986	The Taming of the Shrew	Petruchio	New Fortune Theatre, Perth
1986	The Recruiting Officer	Brazen	Playhouse, Adelaide with STCSA
1986	Wild Honey	Circus Style Performer	Seymour Centre, Sydney with Nimrod
1986–1987	Emerald City	Colin	Sydney Opera House, Playhouse, Adelaide, Canberra Theatre with STC
1988	Ghosts	Pastor Manders	Belvoir, Sydney
1988	Hedda Gabler	Brack	Playhouse, Melbourne with MTC
1989	Big River: The Adventures of Huckleberry Finn	The Duke	Her Majesty's Theatre, Sydney, Lyric Theatre, Brisbane, Her Majesty's Theatre, Melbourne
1990	The Tempest		Belvoir, Sydney
1991	Shadowlands	C. S. Lewis	Sydney Opera House with STC
1991–1992	The Merchant of Venice	Shylock	Australian tour with Bell Shakespeare
1994	Macbeth	Macbeth	Australian tour with Bell Shakespeare
1993	Romeo and Juliet	The Prince	Australian tour with Bell Shakespeare
1993	Sydney Symphony Orchestra	Narrator	Sydney Opera House
1994	The Bard on Broadway		Regent Hotel, Sydney with Bell Shakespeare
1995	Twelfth Night	Malvolio	Australian tour with Bell Shakespeare
1996	Much Ado About Nothing	Benedick	Australian tour with Bell Shakespeare
1996	Coriolanus	Coriolanus	Australian tour with Bell Shakespeare
1997	An Evening of Romance		Mayfair Ballroom, Melbourne with Bell Shakespeare
1997	The Winter's Tale	Leontes	Australian tour with Bell Shakespeare
1997	The Tempest	Prospero	Australian tour with Bell Shakespeare
1998	Spoken Word – John Bell	Storyteller	Sydney Opera House
1998	King Lear	Lear	Australian tour with Bell Shakespeare
1998	Is Shakespeare Literature or Theatre?	Presenter	Sydney Opera House
1999	Long Day's Journey into Night	James Tyrone	Australian tour with Bell Shakespeare
1999	John Bell AM	Storyteller	Sydney Opera House
1999	Bell Shakespeare Wants You: Free Lunchtime Forum		Playhouse, Canberra with Bell Shakespeare
2000	Dance of Death		Royalty Theatre, Adelaide, Theatre X (Cai), Tokyo, Aichi Prefecture, Nagoya, Playhouse, Canberra with STCSA & Bell Shakespeare
2000	Troilus and Cressida	Ulysses / Greek General	Australian tour with Bell Shakespeare
2002	Richard III	Richard, Duke of Gloucester	Australian tour with QTC
2004	Sydney Symphony Orchestra: A Lincoln Portrait / Fly / Henry V		Sydney Opera House
2006	The Tempest	Prospero	Australian tour with Bell Shakespeare
2006	Moby Dick	Captain Ahab	Glen Street Theatre, Sydney, Theatre Royal, Hobart with Bell Shakespeare
2007	Sydney Symphony: Monuments Symphony No. 7	Speaker	Sydney Opera House
2008	Anatomy Titus Fall of Rome: A Shakespeare Commentary	Titus Andronicus	Australian tour with Bell Shakespeare & QTC
2010	King Lear	King Lear	Australian tour with Bell Shakespeare
2010	Uncle Vanya	Serebryakov, the Professor	STC, Washington & New York with Bell Shakespeare & STC
2011	Midsummer Shakespeare		The Domain, Sydney with Bell Shakespeare
2011	Faustus	Mephistopheles	Brisbane Powerhouse, Sydney Opera House, Illawarra Performing Arts Centre with Bell Shakespeare & QTC
2013	Henry IV	Falstaff	Australian tour with Bell Shakespeare
2015	As You Like It	Jaques / Le Beau	Sydney Opera House, Playhouse, Canberra, Fairfax Studio, Melbourne with Bell Shakespeare
2015	Ivanov	Shabelsky	Belvoir, Sydney
2016	Mercy	Speaker	Sydney Opera House with Bell Shakespeare
2017	John Bell and Simon Tedeschi	Narrator	Sydney Opera House
2017	Enoch Arden	Narrator	Space Theatre, Adelaide with Adelaide Festival Centre
2017	The Father	André	Wharf Theatre with STC & Fairfax Studio with MTC
2018	Bright Star	John Keats	Australian tour
2018–2019	Diplomacy	General Deitrich von Choltitz	Ensemble Theatre, Sydney
2019	The Miser	The Miser	Sydney Opera House, Canberra Theatre, Arts Centre Melbourne with Bell Shakespeare
2019	John Bell: A Few of My Favourite Things	Storyteller	Ensemble Theatre, Sydney & Edinburgh Festival
2021–2022	Grand Horizons	Bill	Roslyn Packer Theatre with STC
2022	A Christmas Carol	Scrooge / Crummles	Ensemble Theatre, Sydney
2021–2022	One Man in His Time	Storyteller	The Neilson Nutshell, Sydney, Arts Centre Melbourne with Bell Shakespeare
2022	Words and Music	Reader	Blue Mountains Theatre
2022	With Love, Amadeus	Reader	Shoalhaven Entertainment Centre, Wagstaffe Hall, Ukaria Cultural Centre, Mt Barker
2022	John Bell: And Another Thing...	Storyteller	Ensemble Theatre, Sydney
2022	Haydn Speaks	Joseph Haydn	City Recital Hall, Sydney with the Australian Haydn Ensemble
2024	A Musical Tempest with John Bell		With SSO

=== As director / crew ===
Year	Title	Role	Notes
1962	Coriolanus	Designer	University of Sydney
1963	Lunch Hour	Stage Manager	Palace Theatre, Sydney with Old Tote
1964	The American Dream	Stage Manager	Palace Theatre, Sydney with Old Tote
1970	A Midsummer Night's Dream	Director	UNSW Old Tote, Sydney with NIDA
1970–1971	The Legend of King O'Malley	Director	Australian national tour with NIDA
1970	Biggles	Director	Nimrod, Sydney with Old Tote
1971	Macbeth	Director / Designer	Nimrod, Sydney
1971	Flash Jim Vaux	Director	Nimrod, Sydney with Old Tote
1971	The Removalists	Director	Nimrod, Sydney
1972	Measure for Measure	Director	Nimrod, Sydney
1972	The Good Woman of Setzuan	Director	UNSW Old Tote, Sydney
1972	The Removalists	Director	Phillip St Theatre, Sydney with Harry M. Miller
1972	How Could You Believe Me When I Said I'd Be Your Valet When You Know I've Been a Liar All My Life?	Director	UNSW Old Tote, Sydney, Canberra Theatre
1973	The Tooth of Crime	Director	Nimrod, Sydney
1973	President Wilson in Paris	Director	Nimrod, Sydney
1973	Hamlet	Director	Nimrod, Sydney, Pram Factory, Melbourne, Playhouse, Canberra
1973	Kabul	Director	UNSW Old Tote, Sydney
1973–1974	A Hard God	Director	Nimrod, Sydney, St Martins Theatre, Melbourne, Playhouse, Canberra
1974	The Bacchoi	Director	Nimrod, Sydney
1974	Don Giovanni	Director	Sydney Opera House with Opera Australia
1974	How Does Your Garden Grow?	Director	Nimrod, Sydney
1975	You Want It Don't You Billy?	Director	Nimrod, Sydney
1975	Singles	Director	Nimrod, Sydney
1975	Mates and Brothers	Director	Nimrod, Sydney, Playhouse, Adelaide
1975–1976	Mates	Director	Nimrod, Sydney, Playhouse, Adelaide
1975–1976	The Christian Brothers	Director	Australian tour
1975–1977	Much Ado About Nothing	Director	Nimrod, Sydney, Space Theatre, Adelaide
1976	The Speakers	Director	Nimrod, Sydney
1976	How Could You Believe Me When I Said I'd Be Your Valet When You Know I've Been a Liar All My Life?	Adaptor	La Boite, Brisbane
1976	A Handful of Friends	Director	Nimrod, Sydney
1977	Inner Voices	Director	Nimrod, Sydney
1977	Twelfth Night	Director	Nimrod, Sydney
1977	Treasure Island	Designer	Ipswich Arts Theatre, UK
1977–1980	The Club	Director	Australian tour with Nimrod, Hampstead Theatre, London, The Old Vic, London
1978	Everyman	Director	Nimrod, Sydney
1978	Marxisms	Director	Nimrod, Sydney
1978	Perfect Strangers	Director	Theatre Royal, Hobart, Playbox Theatre, Melbourne with Northside Theatre Company & Nimrod
1978–1979	The Christian Brothers	Director	Australia & NZ tour, Nuffield Theatre, Southampton, Riverside Studios, London
1978	The Comedy of Errors	Director	Nimrod, Sydney
1979	In Praise of Love	Designer	Plymouth Athenaeum with Plymouth Theatre Company
1979	The Curse of the Werewolf	Designer	Haymarket Theatre, Basingstoke
1979	Romeo and Juliet	Director	Octagon Theatre, Perth, Nimrod, Sydney, Seymour Centre, Sydney
1979	Travelling North	Director	Australian tour
1979	The Venetian Twins	Director	Sydney Opera House with STC & Nimrod
1979–1980	Don’t Just Lie There, Say Something!	Set Design	UK tour with Plymouth Theatre Company
1980	The Club	Director	The Old Vic, London, Hampstead Theatre, London with Nimrod
1980	I Have Been Here Before	Designer	The Old Vic, London, Oxford Playhouse with Horseshoe Theatre Company
1980	The House of the Deaf Man	Director	Nimrod, Sydney
1980	The Oresteia	Director	Nimrod, Sydney
1980	Volpone	Director	Nimrod, Sydney
1980	How Could You Believe Me When I Said I'd Be Your Valet When You Know I've Been a Liar All My Life?	Adaptor / Director	Townsville Civic Centre
1980	Celluloid Heroes	Director	Australian tour
1981	The Venetian Twins	Director	Australian tour
1981	Last Day in Woolloomooloo	Director	Nimrod, Sydney
1981	Black and Blue	Designer	Horseshoe Theatre, Basingstoke with Horseshoe Theatre Company
1982	Candide	Director	Melbourne with Nimrod
1982	Tristram Shandy	Director	Nimrod, Sydney
1982–1983	Variations	Director	Nimrod, Sydney, Seymour Centre, Sydney
1982–1983	Lady Chatterley’s Lover	Designer	Theatre Royal, Bath
1983	The Hitchhiker's Guide to the Galaxy	Designer	Belgrade Theatre, Coventry
1983	As You Like It	Director	Nimrod, Sydney
1984	The Servant of Two Masters	Director	Nimrod, Sydney
1984	The Boiling Frog	Director	Nimrod, Sydney
1985	Cheapside	Director	Seymour Centre, Sydney with Nimrod
1986	The Recruiting Officer	Director	Playhouse, Adelaide with STCSA
1986	The Winter’s Tale	Director	NIDA, Sydney
1987	Joking Apart	Designer	Belgrade Theatre, Coventry
1987	Tartuffe	Director	Seymour Centre, Sydney with Nimrod
1988	Manning Clark's History of Australia – The Musical	Director	Princess Theatre, Melbourne
1988	Frankie and Johnny in the Clair de Lune	Director	University of Sydney
1988	Dinkum Assorted	Director	Sydney Opera House, Playhouse, Melbourne with MTC & STC
1989	Lost Weekend	Director	Cremorne Theatre, Brisbane with QTC
1990	The Venetian Twins	Director	Australian tour with QTC
1991–1993	Hamlet	Director	Australian tour with Bell Shakespeare
1992	The Virgin Spring	Designer	Courtyard Theatre, London
1992–1993	Richard III	Director	Australian tour with Bell Shakespeare
1993	Romeo and Juliet	Director	Australian tour with Bell Shakespeare
1994	The Taming of the Shrew	Director	Australian tour with Bell Shakespeare
1995	Pericles	Director	Australian tour with Bell Shakespeare
1996	Much Ado About Nothing	Director	Australian tour with Bell Shakespeare
1998	Henry IV	Director	Australian tour with Bell Shakespeare
1999	Romeo and Juliet	Artistic Director	The Capital, Bendigo with Bell Shakespeare
1999	Henry V	Director	Australian tour with Bell Shakespeare
2000	The Falls	Director	Stables Theatre, Sydney with Griffin Theatre Company
2001	Julius Caesar	Artistic Director	Sydney Opera House with Bell Shakespeare
2001	Antony and Cleopatra	Director	Australian tour with Bell Shakespeare
2001	The Christian Brothers	Director	Sydney Opera House with STC
2002	Hippolytus	Director	Government House, Sydney with Bell Shakespeare
2002; 2004	The Comedy of Errors	Director	Australian tour with Bell Shakespeare
2002	The Soldier's Tale	Artistic Director	Sydney Opera House, Concert Hall, Brisbane with Bell Shakespeare
2003	Hamlet	Director	Australian tour with Bell Shakespeare
2003	The Christian Brothers	Director	Australian tour
2003	The Bell Shakespeare Company Regional Tour of Tasmania	Director	Tasmanian tour
2003–2005	The Servant of Two Masters	Director	Australian tour with Bell Shakespeare
2004	Twelfth Night	Director	Sydney Opera House with Bell Shakespeare
2005	Measure for Measure	Director	Australian tour with Bell Shakespeare
2006	The Comedy of Errors	Director	Theatre Royal, Bath, Blackpool Grand Theatre, UK with Bell Shakespeare
2006	Romeo and Juliet	Director	Australian tour Bell Shakespeare
2006	Moby Dick	Adaptor	Glen St Theatre, Sydney, Theatre Royal, Hobart with Bell Shakespeare
2007	Macbeth	Director	Australian tour
2007	The Government Inspector	Director	Australian tour with Bell Shakespeare
2008	As You Like It	Director	Australian tour with Bell Shakespeare
2008–2009	Madame Butterfly	Director	Australian tour with Oz Opera
2009	The Alchemist	Director	Australian tour with Bell Shakespeare & QTC
2009	Pericles	Director	Sydney Opera House, Playhouse, Melbourne with Bell Shakespeare
2011	Much Ado About Nothing	Director	Australian tour with Bell Shakespeare
2012	The Duchess of Malfi	Director	Sydney Opera House with Bell Shakespeare
2012	Romeo and Juliet	Director	Hamer Hall, Melbourne with Bell Shakespeare
2013	Henry IV	Director	Australian tour with Bell Shakespeare
2013; 2015; 2017; 2021	Tosca	Director	Sydney Opera House with Opera Australia
2014	The Winter’s Tale	Director	Sydney Opera House with Bell Shakespeare
2014–2015	Monkey: Journey to the West	Director	Australian tour with Kim Carpenter's Theatre of Image
2015	The Tempest	Director	Sydney Opera House with Bell Shakespeare
2015	Romeo and Juliet	Director	Sydney Opera House with SSO & The Australian Ballet
2016; 2017; 2020	Carmen	Director	Sydney Opera House with Opera Australia
2018–2019	Diplomacy	Director	Ensemble Theatre, Sydney
2018	Madama Butterfly	Director	Australian regional tour with Opera Australia
