= Hamlet (1974 film) =

1974 television film

- Based on: Hamlet by William Shakespeare
- Directed by: Julian Pringle
- Starring: John Bell; Jeff Ashby; Anna Volska; Max Cullen
- Country of origin: Australia
- Original language: English

Production
- Producer: Alan Burke
- Running time: 150 mins
- Production company: ABC

Original release
- Network: ABC
- Release: 19 October 1974

Hamlet is a 1974 filmed adaptation of John Bell and Richard Wherrett's theatre production of the play.

== Cast ==
- John Bell as Hamlet
- Jeff Ashby as Claudius
- Max Cullen as Polonius and gravedigger
- Ken Lawrence as Marcellus, Fortinbras
- Roger Newcombe as Laertes and Guildenstern
- John Paramor as Rosencrantz and Horatio
- Anna Volska as Ophelia
- Beverly Phillips as Gertrude
- Michael Rolfe
- Wayne Phelan

== Production ==
The text was reduced to 150 minutes with 21 characters played by a cast of ten. It was filmed less than a year before it aired.

It was one of a series of play productions the ABC filmed around 1972 to 1974.
