= Armine Sandford =

English actress and news presenter (1928–2011)

== Introduction ==
Armine Margaret Sandford (1928 – 4 January 2011) was an English actress and news presenter.

Born in St Germans, Cornwall, Sandford was the daughter of a physician who practised at Exeter. In 1950 she appeared in a stage revival of Doctor Faustus, and during an acting career on screen she appeared in the films A Town Like Alice (1956), A Picture of Autumn (1957) and Virtuoso (1959), and continued to appear in television programmes until about 1966.

On 30 September 1957, Sandford became the first woman television newsreader when she joined the BBC West Region's daily television news bulletin from its studios in Bristol.

She died in 2011 in Leicester, aged 82.

== Filmography ==
- A Town Like Alice (1956)
