= 2/9th Cavalry Commando Regiment =

Commando regiment raised by the Australian Army

- Active: 1940–1945
- Country: Australia
- Branch: Australian Army
- Type: 1. light armoured (1940 – 1943); 2. commando/light infantry (1943 – 1945)
- Role: 1. armoured cavalry 2. reconnaissance/long range patrol
- Size: ~800–900 all ranks
- Part of: Australian 9th Division
- Engagements: World War II: North African campaign; Borneo campaign

Insignia
- Unit colour patch

The 2/9th Cavalry (Commando) Regiment was one of three commando regiments raised by the Australian Army for service during World War II. It was originally raised in 1940 as an armoured cavalry unit as part of the 8th Division, before being transferred to the 9th Division. Between 1941 and 1942 the regiment saw action in the Middle East before being returned to Australia in early 1943. At this time the regiment was re-organised as the administrative headquarters for the 2/4th, 2/11th and 2/12th Commando Squadrons and it was converted into a commando regiment. Later in 1945 the unit saw action during the landings on Tarakan on Borneo before being disbanded upon the cessation of hostilities.

== History ==
=== Formation ===
The 2/9th Cavalry (Commando) Regiment was formed in July 1940 at Seymour, Victoria as part of the Second Australian Imperial Force of the Australian Army. Initially, it was designated the "8th Division Cavalry Regiment"; however, it was redesignated as the "9th Division Cavalry Regiment" in February 1941 when the 8th Division was sent to Malaya without its armoured elements, which were subsequently transferred to the 9th Division.

=== Service in the Middle East ===
Under the command of Lieutenant Colonel Hector Bastin, training was completed at the Armoured Vehicles Fighting School, before along with the rest of the 9th Division, the regiment was sent to the Middle East, arriving in Egypt in April 1941. Equipped with Vickers light tanks and Bren carriers, the regiment then saw action in Syria where it supported the 7th Division. During this time the regiment's squadrons were detached at brigade level with 'A' Squadron being placed under the operational command of the 21st Brigade near Saida, while 'C' Squadron was allocated to the 25th Brigade, utilising a number of captured Vichy French Renault R35 tanks.

After this the regiment was re-equipped, receiving Crusader and Stuart tanks to replace the Vickers and captured French tanks that they had previously been using. This had been done as a response to the increased threat posed by German armour in the theatre. In July 1942, the 9th Division was sent to help rectify the situation at El Alamein, where German and Italian troops were attacking. The 9th Division Cavalry Regiment was involved in the defence of the Alamein line during this phase, defending the divisional headquarters and supporting the defending infantry units in small scale raids. In October 1942, when the Allies launched an offensive, the regiment initially played only a minor part but later, after breakout had been achieved, it came into its own and led the Allied advance along the coastal plain, pursuing the withdrawing German and Italian forces and advancing over 20 miles (32 km) on 3 November alone. During the battle, Lieutenant Colonel William Muntz, who had previously served in the 7th Divisional Cavalry Regiment, took command of the regiment after Bastin fell sick, assuming command on 20 October 1942. Casualties during the regiment's involvement in the Middle East amounted to six killed in action, six died of wounds and one died of other causes. Its personnel received the following decorations for service during this time: one Officer of the Order of the British Empire, three Military Crosses, seven Military Medals, and 27 Mentions in Despatches.

=== Service in the Pacific ===
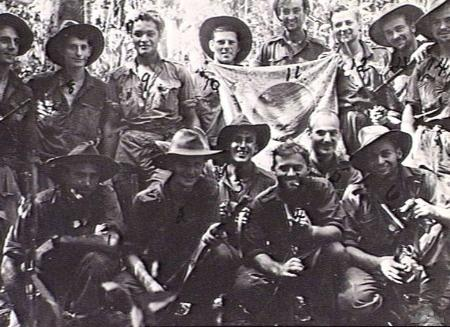
Members of the Australian 2/4th Commando Squadron on Tarakan Island in June 1945

In early 1943, the regiment was returned to Australia where, in April, it began to reorganise on the Atherton Tablelands in Queensland in preparation for jungle fighting against the Japanese. At this time the Australian Army was undergoing a period of restructuring as its strategic focus shifted towards concentrating upon fighting the war against the Japanese in the Pacific. As a part of this there was no need for divisional cavalry regiments; however, it was decided that the independent companies should be grouped together under a regimental structure, and in response the divisional cavalry regiments were broken up and their headquarters elements were used to administer the commando squadrons. Three such units were formed at this time, with the 9th Division Cavalry Regiment adopting the title of the "2/9th Cavalry (Commando) Regiment" in January 1944. The subordinate squadrons that were attached to it were the 2/4th, 2/11th and 2/12th Commando Squadrons. Following this the regiment continued to undertake training on the Atherton Tablelands in preparation for operations in the Southwest Pacific. In the end, however, it was over a year before the regiment saw action again, taking part in the landings at Tarakan, and in northern Borneo in mid-1945 in one of the final campaigns of the war.

During this campaign, the regiment's three squadrons were detached separately. The 2/4th was attached to the 26th Brigade, and saw heavy fighting on Tarakan, suffering a considerable number of casualties. The 2/11th was attached to the 24th Brigade and landed on Labuan Island off the northwest coast of Borneo. After clearing the island, they were transferred to the mainland and helped clear the Klias Peninsula. The 2/12th, however, was initially held back in divisional reserve, and as such did not take part in the main fighting on Labuan Island. As the Japanese resistance on the island was coming to an end and the focus of Australian operations moved towards the mainland of Borneo, the squadron was finally committed to operations when it was given the task of carrying out mopping up operations on the island.

== Commanding officers ==
The 2/9th Cavalry Commando Regiment's Commanding Officers were as follows:

- Lieutenant Colonel Hector Ernest Bastin;
- Lieutenant Colonel William Norris Muntz.

== Battle honours ==
The regiment received the following battle honours for their service during World War II:

- North Africa 1942, Defence of Alamein Line, Tell el Eisa, Tell el Makh Khad, Sanyet el Miteirya, West Point 23, El Alamein, Syria 1941, Sidon, Wadi Zeini, Jebel Mazar, South-West Pacific 1945, Borneo, Labuan.

== See also ==
- List of Australian armoured units
