= A Town Like Alice (film) =

1956 British film by Jack Lee

- Directed by: Jack Lee
- Written by: W. P. Lipscomb; Richard Mason
- Based on: A Town Like Alice by Nevil Shute
- Produced by: Joseph Janni
- Starring: Virginia McKenna; Peter Finch
- Cinematography: Geoffrey Unsworth
- Edited by: Sidney Hayers
- Music by: Matyas Seiber
- Distributed by: The Rank Organisation
- Release date: 1 March 1956
- Running time: 117 min
- Countries: United Kingdom; Australia
- Language: English
- Box office: 1,037,005 admissions (France)

A Town Like Alice (also known as The Rape of Malaya) is a 1956 British drama film directed by Jack Lee and starring Virginia McKenna and Peter Finch. It was written by W. P. Lipscomb and Richard Mason based on the 1950 novel of the same name by Nevil Shute.The film does not follow the whole novel, concluding at the end of part two and truncating or omitting much detail. It was partially filmed in Malaya and Australia and produced by Joseph Janni.

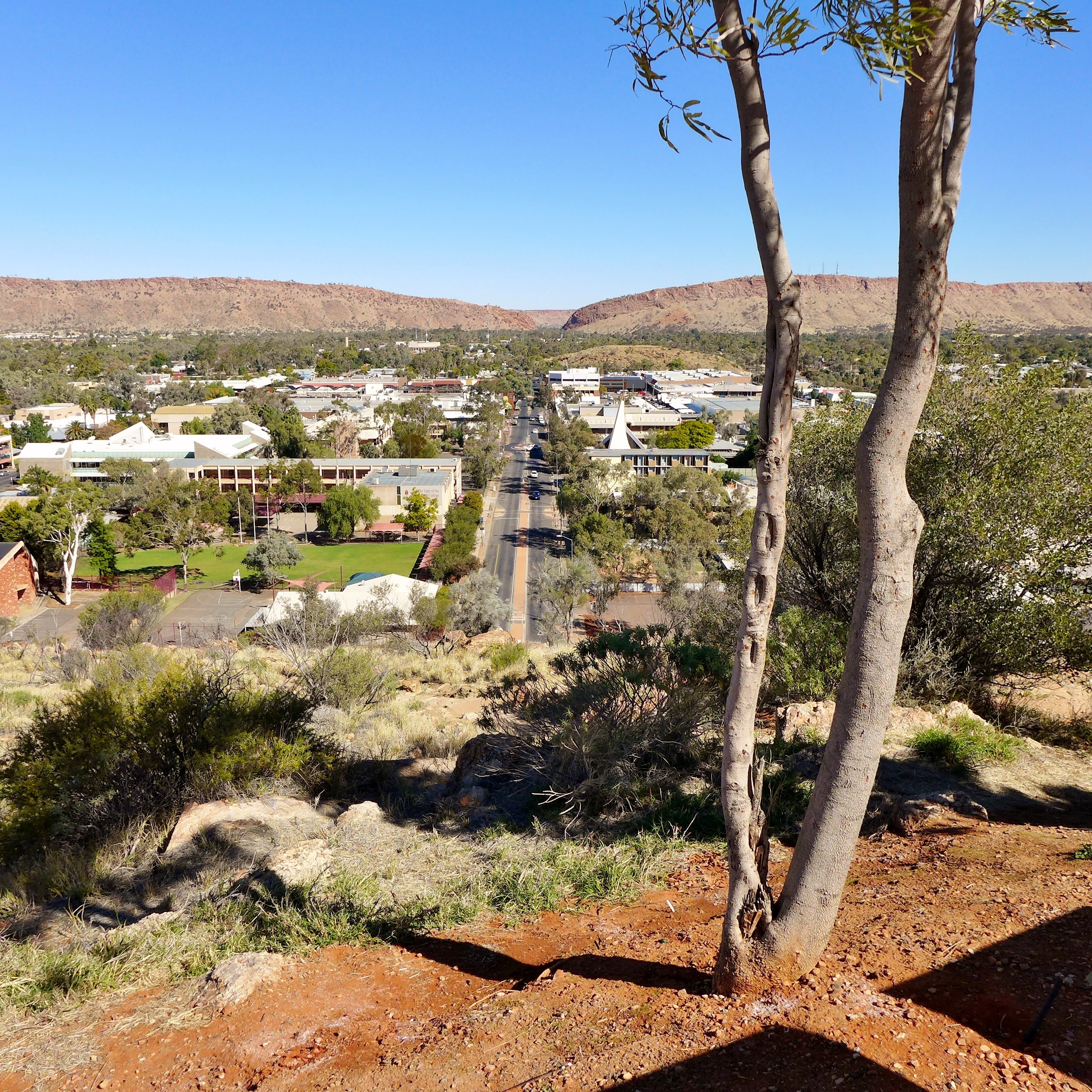
Alice Springs

== Plot ==
In post-Second World War London, a young woman, Jean Paget, is informed by solicitor Noel Strachan that she has a large inheritance. Jean uses part of it to build a well in a small village in Malaya. The village women will no longer have to walk so far each day to collect water. She lived and worked there for three years during the war.

The film then goes in flashback to 1942. Jean is working in an office in Kuala Lumpur in Malaya when the Japanese invade. When she stays to help the wife of her employer, Mr. Holland, with her three children, she is taken prisoner, along with other white men, women and children. The men are taken away to prison. The women and children, however, are made to walk from place to place, looking for a ship to transport them to Singapore, but at each place, there is no ship available, and the Japanese authorities have no wish to take responsibility for them.

On their trek, the group meet a young Australian soldier, Sergeant Joe Harman, also a prisoner, who drives a truck for the Japanese. He steals petrol and barters it for medicine for them. He and Jean strike up a friendship in the little time they have together, and he tells her about Alice Springs, the town where he grew up. Jean does not correct his impression that she is married (she is carrying the youngest of Mrs. Holland's children, the mother having succumbed to the endless walking).

One day, the eldest Holland child, a young boy, wanders off into the jungle and is fatally bitten by a snake. At one stop, a Japanese officer likes Jean's looks and offers to let her and the baby remain, while the rest travel another 200 miles to Kuantan on the east coast. Jean turns away but another young woman is not so choosy after four months of walking and the deaths of four women and the boy so gets into the officer's car. More die, including four-year-old Jane Holland.

They run into Joe twice more. The second time, he secretly drops them a package of food as he drives by in a truck. They stop at the same place that night, and Joe and Jean talk some more. She reveals she is not married. Joe steals chickens for them from the harsh Captain Sugaya. However, Sugaya has no trouble identifying the thief; the chickens are nowhere about, and Joe was the only one who left the depot. When the women are found eating chicken, Jean claims they bought the birds, but that is a transparent lie. When Joe sees Jean being relentlessly questioned, he confesses and attacks the interrogator. As punishment, Sugaya has him crucified, nailed to a large tree. The prisoners, both men and women, are forced to watch all day and night.

Sugaya orders the women to continue marching; he leaves them only one guard, the kindly sergeant, so that he can bear his disgrace alone. When he dies of exhaustion, Jean asks the elders of a Malayan village if they may stay and work in the paddy fields, asking only for food and a place to sleep, telling them that over half of the marchers have died. The elders agree and they stay there until the war ends. Afterwards, Jean gives Mr. Holland back his only surviving child.

The film returns to the present, and Jean is stunned to learn that Joe survived his ordeal. She travels to Alice Springs, then to the (fictional) town of Willstown in the Queensland outback, where Joe has resumed his job as manager of a cattle station. Joe, however, has gone to London to find her. Finally re-united at Alice Springs Airport, they embrace.

== Cast ==
- Virginia McKenna as Jean Paget
- Peter Finch as Joe Harman
- Kenji Takaki as Japanese Sergeant
- Tran Van Khe as Captain Sugaya
- Jean Anderson as Miss Horsefall
- Marie Lohr as Mrs. Dudley Frost
- Maureen Swanson as Ellen
- Renée Houston as Ebbey
- Nora Nicholson as Mrs. Frith
- Eileen Moore as Mrs. Holland
- John Fabian as Mr. Holland
- Vincent Ball as Ben
- Tim Turner as British Sergeant
- Vu Ngoc Tuan as Captain Yanata
- Yamada as Captain Takata
- Nakanishi as Captain Nishi
- Ikeda as Kempetei Sergeant
- Geoffrey Keen as solicitor
- June Shaw as Mrs. Graham
- Armine Sandford as Mrs. Carstairs
- Mary Allen as Mrs. Anderson
- Virginia Clay as Mrs. Knowles
- Bay White as Mrs. Davies
- Philippa Morgan as Mrs. Lindsay
- Dorothy Moss as Mrs. O'Brien
- Gwenda Ewen as Mrs. Rhodes
- Josephine Miller as Daphne Adams
- Edwina Carroll as Fatima
- Sanny Bin Hussan as Mat Amin
- Charles Marshall as well digger
- Jane White as Brenda
- Cameron Moore as Freddie
- Margaret Eaden as Jane
- Domenic Lieven as Michael Rhodes
- Peter John as Timothy
- Meg Buckenham as Mary Graham
- Geoffrey Hawkins as Robin
- Sam Kydd as Australian driver (uncredited)

== Production ==
Leslie Norman expressed interest in making a film of the novel in 1952. In December 1954 Earl St John of Rank said he hoped Olivia de Havilland would star alongside Peter Finch, who had just signed a long-term contract with Rank.

Anna Kashfi screen tested for a small role and was given it, but had to turn it down to do another film. Jack Lee had worked with Peter Finch on The Wooden Horse, and cast him as the male lead. "I don't think we ever considered anyone else for the part."

The script was written by W. P. Lipscomb, who concentrated on the first half of the novel (the second half being set in Australia). Producer Joseph Janni sent a copy of the script to director Jack Lee, who later recalled, "the script made me cry and I knew it would make audiences cry too". Janni and Lee took the script to Rank, who agreed to finance it. Lee did further work on the script with Lipscomb and then with Richard Mason. It was a rare film from the Rank Organisation at the time to focus on a female character.

Lee flew to Singapore and Malaya, and "soon realised that if we cast the film in the UK, decided on their exact clothing and filmed their characteristic way of walking, we could find a second cast in Malaya, and, if we were careful, we could work very close to them on location". Lee shot some footage in Malaya then went back to Britain, where the majority of the film was shot at Pinewood Studios in London. Filming started September 1955.

== Release ==
The film was withdrawn from the 1956 Cannes Film Festival because of fears it would offend the Japanese. "The festivals are just a joke – a film-selling 'racket' which offers the chance for vulgar display and reckless extravagance", said Peter Finch. "They serve no cultural purpose and the awards don't mean a thing".

The film's Australian premiere was held at Alice Springs.

== Reception ==
=== Box office ===
The film was the third most popular film at the British box office in 1956.

The film was released in Los Angeles and Hartford, Connecticut but was not successful and was pulled from release in other parts of the United States.

=== Critical ===
The Monthly Film Bulletin wrote: "There is little formal plot in this account of aimless and heartbreaking wanderings, and scarcely even a developing situation: it is the monotonous and hopeless journey rather than the occasional violent or tragic incident that essentially forms the film's subject. To convey this, script and direction lean heavily on the technique of deliberate under-statement, and the studies of individual behaviour under strain are realised with decorous reticence. ... The film's passionless, under-dramatised style scarcely encourages the harsh intervention of reality: here, once again, is war reinterpreted in the comforting terms of polite fiction."

Picturegoer wrote: "The film has no heat, no urgency and, perhaps at the root of it all, no heart."

Picture Show wrote: "Impressive and moving drama."

Variety wrote: "The subject matter is necessarily grim, but wherever possible the script and Jack Lee's direction endeavor to infuse a touch of lighter relief. ... From a technical standpoint, the film is beyond reproach. The acting is on a consistently high level, the direction is smooth and the camerawork is first-class."

Filmink wrote: "Swanson made a particularly noticeable splash... effectively contrasting with the “sensible girl” persona of star Virginia McKenna (it’s a great pity that they were never re-teamed, they could’ve made a wonderful double act)."

== See also ==
- A Town Like Alice (miniseries) – 1981 Australian television adaptation
- Tenko (TV series) – 1981–84 BBC and ABC TV series based on the female prisoners of war in Singapore during World War II
- Paradise Road – film based on the female prisoners of war in Sumatra in World War II
