= A Town Like Alice =

1950 novel by Nevil Shute

- First edition
- Author: Nevil Shute
- Language: English
- Genre: War, romance
- Publisher: Heinemann
- Publication date: 1950
- Publication place: United Kingdom
- Media type: Print (Softcover)
- Pages: 359 pp
- ISBN: 978-0307474001

A Town Like Alice (United States title: The Legacy) is a romance novel by Nevil Shute, published in 1950 when Shute had newly settled in Australia. Jean Paget, a young Englishwoman, becomes romantically interested in a fellow prisoner of World War II in Malaya, and after liberation emigrates to Australia to be with him, where she attempts, by investing her substantial financial inheritance, to generate economic prosperity in a small outback community—to turn it into "a town like Alice" i.e. Alice Springs.

== Plot summary ==
The story falls broadly into three parts.

In post-World War II London, Jean Paget, a secretary in a leather goods factory, is informed by solicitor Noel Strachan that she has inherited a considerable sum of money from an uncle she never knew. But the solicitor is now her trustee and she has the use of only the income until she inherits absolutely, at the age of thirty-five, several years in the future. In the firm's interest, but increasingly with personal interest, Strachan acts as her guide and advisor. Jean decides that her priority is to build a well in a Malayan village.

The second part of the story flashes back to Jean's experiences during the war, when she was working in Malaya at the time the Japanese invaded and was taken prisoner together with a group of women and children. As she speaks Malay fluently, Jean takes a leading role in the group of prisoners. The Japanese refuse all responsibility for the group and march them from one village to another. Many of them, not used to physical hardship, die.

Jean meets an Australian soldier, Sergeant Joe Harman, also a prisoner, who is driving a lorry for the Japanese and they strike up a friendship. He steals food and medicines to help them. Jean is carrying a toddler whose mother has died and this leads Harman to believe that she is married; to avoid complications, Jean does not correct this assumption. On one occasion, Harman steals five chickens from the local Japanese commander. The thefts are investigated and Harman takes the blame to save Jean and the rest of the group. He is beaten, crucified, and left to die by the Japanese soldiers. The women are marched away, believing that he is dead.

When their sole Japanese guard dies, the women become part of a Malayan village community. They live and work there for three years, until the war ends and they are repatriated.

Now a wealthy woman (at least on paper), Jean decides she wants to build a well for the village so that the women will not have to walk so far to collect water: "A gift by women, for women". She travels to Malaya, where she goes back to the village and persuades the headman to allow her to build the well. While it is being built she discovers that Joe Harman survived and returned to Australia. She decides to search for him. On her travels, she visits the town of Alice Springs, where Joe lived before the war, and is much impressed with the quality of life there. She then travels to the (fictional) primitive town of Willstown in the Queensland outback, where Joe has become manager of a cattle station. She soon discovers that the quality of life in "Alice" is an anomaly, and life for a woman in the outback is elsewhere very rugged. Willstown is described as "a fair cow".

Meanwhile, Joe has met a pilot who helped repatriate the women, from whom he learns that Jean survived the war and that she was never married. He travels to London to find her, using money won in the Golden Casket lottery. He finds his way to Strachan's office, but is told that she has gone travelling in the Far East. Disappointed, he gets drunk and is arrested, but is bailed out by Strachan. Without revealing Jean's actual whereabouts, Strachan persuades Joe to return home by ship and intimates that he may well receive a great surprise there.

While staying in Willstown, awaiting Joe's return, Jean learns that most young girls have to leave the town to find work in the bigger cities. Having worked with a firm in Britain that produced crocodile-leather luxury goods, she gets the idea of founding a local workshop to make shoes from the skins of crocodiles hunted in the outback. With the help of Joe and of Strachan, who releases money from her inheritance, she starts the workshop, followed by a string of other businesses: an ice-cream parlour, a public swimming pool and shops.

The third part of the book shows how Jean's entrepreneurship gives a decisive economic impact to develop Willstown into "a town like Alice"; also, Jean's help in rescuing an injured stockman breaks down many local barriers.

A few years later, an aged Noel Strachan visits Willstown to see the results of Jean's efforts. He reveals that the money which Jean inherited was originally made in an Australian gold rush, and he is satisfied to see the money returning to the site of its making. Jean and Joe name their second son Noel and ask Strachan to be his godfather. They invite Strachan to make his home with them in Australia, but he declines the invitation and returns to Britain.

== Characters ==
- Jean Paget – a young Englishwoman who is taken as a prisoner of war by the Japanese during their invasion of Malaya in 1941 and later finds love with an Australian man she first met as a prisoner in Malaya and with whom she eventually settles in the Australian outback.
- Joe Harman – an Australian cattleman who is a prisoner of war in Malaya; he survives torture and crucifixion in the hands of Japanese Captain Sugamo and eventually gets back to his home in Australia.
- Noel Strachan – the narrator; he is firstly Douglas MacFadden's solicitor and responsible for drafting his will which names Jean Paget as a beneficiary, and establishes him as the eventual co-trustee of the significant estate that Douglas MacFadden leaves to Jean.
- Donald Paget – Jean Paget's brother who lived and worked in Malaya before the war, and who died as a prisoner of war of the Japanese, working as a slave labourer on the "Death Railway" of The Bridge over the River Kwai fame. His death leaves Jean as the sole beneficiary of her uncle's estate.
- Douglas MacFadden – Jean and Donald Paget's uncle, a resident of Ayr, Scotland, whose death in 1948 initiates the chain of events that form the basis of the book's narrative.

== Historical accuracy ==
In a note to the text, Shute wrote that a forced march of women by the Japanese did indeed take place during World War II, but the women in question were Dutch, not British as in the novel, and the march was in Sumatra, not Malaya. Jean Paget was based on Carry Geysel (Mrs J. G. Geysel-Vonck), whom Shute met while visiting Sumatra in 1949. Geysel had been one of a group of about 80 Dutch civilians taken prisoner by Japanese forces at Padang, in the Dutch East Indies in 1942. Shute's understanding was that the women were forced to march around Sumatra for two-and-a-half years, covering 1,900 kilometres (1,200 mi), with fewer than 30 people surviving the march. However, the Nevil Shute Foundation states that this was a misunderstanding, and that the women were merely transported from prison camp to prison camp by the Japanese. "Shute, fortunately misinformed about parts of her experience, mistakenly understands that the women were made to walk. This was possibly the luckiest misunderstanding of his life..." says the Foundation.

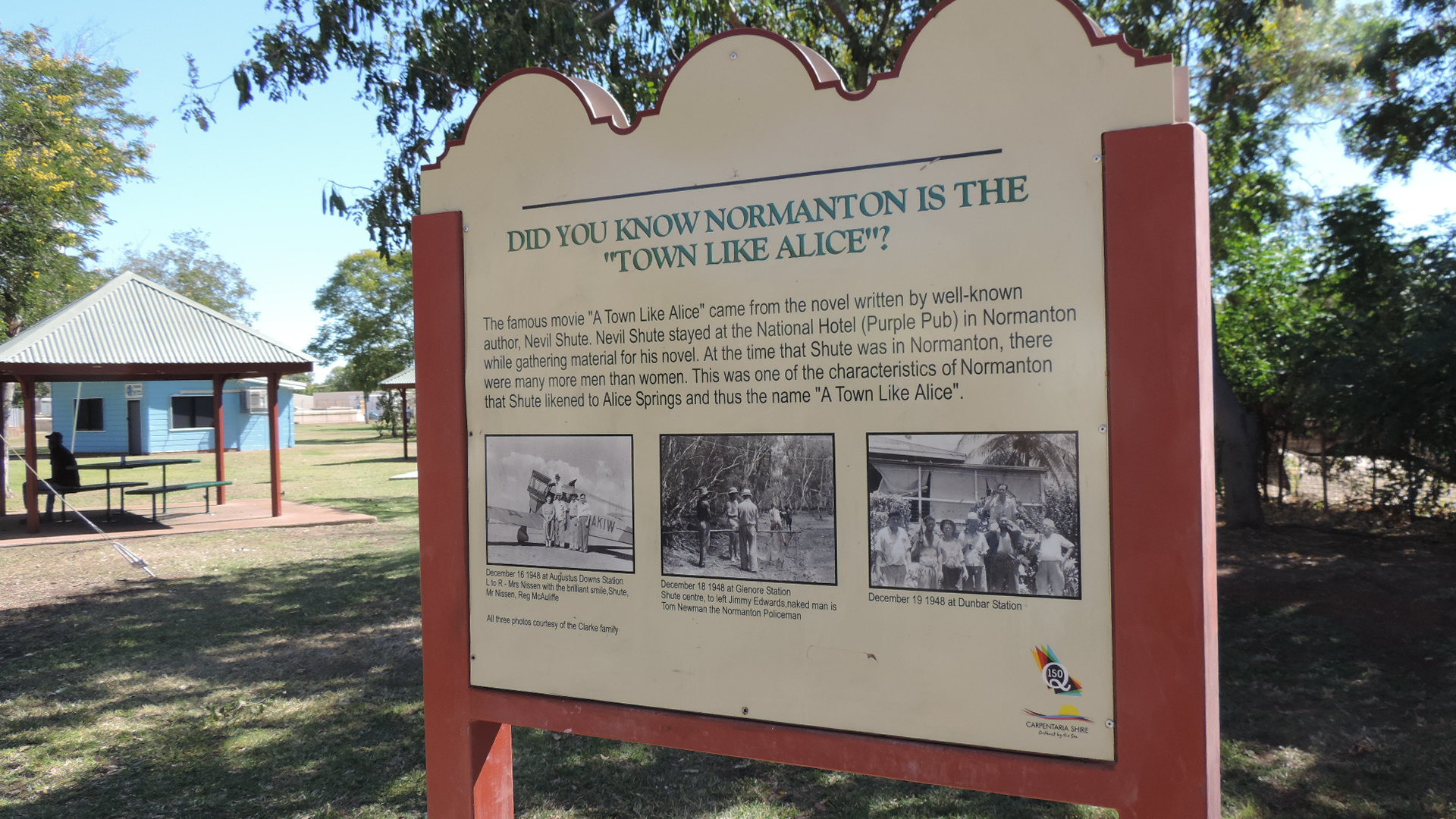
Did you know Normanton is the "Town like Alice"?, Normanton, 2019

Shute based the character of Harman on Herbert James "Ringer" Edwards, whom Shute met in 1948 at a station (ranch) in Queensland. Edwards, an Australian veteran of the Malayan campaign, had been crucified for 63 hours by Japanese soldiers on the Burma Railway. He had later escaped execution a second time, when his "last meal" of chicken and beer could not be obtained. Crucifixion (or haritsuke) was a form of punishment or torture that the Japanese sometimes used against prisoners during the war.

The fictional "Willstown" is reportedly based on Burketown and Normanton in Queensland, which Shute visited in 1948. (Burke and Wills were well-known explorers of Australia.)

== Adaptations ==
=== Cinema ===
The novel was adapted to film in 1956 as A Town Like Alice, directed by Jack Lee, and starring Virginia McKenna and Peter Finch. The film was known as Rape of Malaya in U.S. cinemas, and by various other titles in non-English-speaking countries. It was shown in Japan under the title Malay Death March: A Town Like Alice(Maree shi no koshin: Arisu no yo na machi (「マレー死の行進:アリスのような町).

=== Television ===
In 1981 it was adapted into a popular television miniseries called A Town Like Alice, starring Helen Morse and Bryan Brown (with Gordon Jackson as Noel Strachan). Broadcast internationally, in the United States it was shown as part of the PBS series Masterpiece Theatre.

=== Radio ===
In 1997 a six-part radio version of A Town Like Alice was broadcast on BBC Radio 2 starring Jason Connery, Becky Hindley, Bernard Hepton and Virginia McKenna who had starred as the novel's heroine, Jean Paget, in the 1956 movie version. It was dramatised by Moya O'Shea, produced by Tracey Neale and David Blount and directed by David Blount. It won a Sony Award in 1998.

== See also ==
- Margaret Dryburgh – an English missionary held captive by the Japanese in World War II
- Tenko (TV series) – a 1981–84 BBC and ABC TV series based on the female prisoners of war in Singapore during World War II
- Paradise Road – a film based on the female prisoners of war in Sumatra in World War II
- Tricia N. Goyer - Dawn of a Thousand Nights - a novel based on the prisoners of the Bataan Death March
- Town Called Malice – a 1982 song by British band The Jam, its title inspired by the novel.
