= 2/26th Battalion (Australia) =

Infantry battalion of the Australian Army

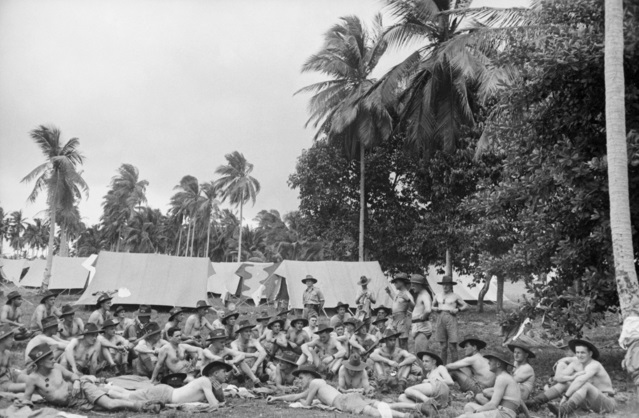
- Troops from the 2/26th shortly after arrival in Malaya
- Active: 1940–45
- Country: Australia
- Branch: Army
- Type: Infantry
- Size: ~900 men
- Part of: 27th Brigade, 8th Division
- Nickname: The Gallopers
- Engagements: Second World War: Malayan campaign

Insignia
- Unit colour patch

The 2/26th Battalion was an infantry battalion of the Australian Army. Raised in late 1940 for service during the Second World War, the battalion undertook garrison duties in Malaya and Singapore prior to the start of the Pacific War. In 1941–42, following the Japanese invasion of Malaya, the battalion fought during the Malayan campaign. After the fall of the island, however, many of its soldiers became prisoners of war, remaining in captivity until being liberated at the end of the war in 1945. The battalion was never re-raised.

== History ==
Formed as part of the Second Australian Imperial Force for service during the Second World War, the 2/26th Battalion was raised in November 1940 at Grovely in Brisbane, Queensland. Under the command of Lieutenant Colonel Arthur Boyes, the battalion formed part of the 27th Brigade along with the 2/29th and 2/30th Battalions. Attached to the 8th Division, the 27th Brigade was the last AIF brigade raised during the war. The colours chosen for the battalion's unit colour patch (UCP) were the same as those of the 26th Battalion, a unit which had served during World War I before being raised as a Militia formation in 1921. These colours were purple over blue, in a diamond shape, although a border of gray in an oval shape was added to the UCP to distinguish the battalion from its Militia counterpart; the oval border denoted that the battalion was an 8th Division unit.

With an authorised strength of around 900 personnel, like other Australian infantry battalions of the time, the battalion was formed around a nucleus of four rifle companies – designated 'A' through to 'D' – each consisting of three platoons. The majority of the 2/26th's personnel were drawn from Queensland and northern New South Wales, and arrived at the battalion in December 1940 after having completed basic training elsewhere, while the officers were hand-picked by Boyes.

In early 1941, the battalion moved to Redbank where further training was undertaken in preparation for joining the rest of the 27th Brigade. In February the 2/26th was transported to Bathurst where they joined the other two battalions assigned to the brigade along with the artillery, anti-tank and engineer units. Brigade-level exercises were conducted and the battalion paraded through the town of Bathurst before finally they received orders for embarkation. On 29 July the final movement order was received and the battalion entrained for Melbourne. Although initially it had been intended that the 2/26th, and indeed the entire 8th Division, would be sent to the Middle East to join the 7th and 9th Divisions in the campaign against the Germans and Italians, concerns about Japanese intentions in the Pacific led to the decision to deploy them in Southeast-Asia instead. Embarking upon the Marnix Van St Aldegonde, a Dutch ship of approximately 20,000 tons displacement, their ultimate destination was Singapore.

Sailing via Fremantle, they arrived in Singapore on 15 August 1941. Upon landing they moved to Camp Wavell at Changi where they settled in to serve as a garrison force. As the possibility of war with Japan grew, the battalion deployed over the Strait of Johore onto the mainland, to build up defences and carry out jungle training, and undertake patrols onto the peninsula to check the accuracy of maps and locate tracks. During this time they were based at Kota Tinggi and Jasin.

On 6 December 1941, the battalion received the code word to adopt battle stations and adopted a defensive position to the north of Kota Tinggi. In the early hours of 8 December, fighting began as the Japanese launched their invasion of Malaya, by landing troops at Kota Bharu. Nevertheless, the battalion saw no action in the first month of the fighting and on 10 January 1942 it was moved to Johore, where the 27th Brigade took up a position in the Segamat sector as part of "Westforce", alongside British and Indian troops. The 2/26th Battalion was located at the Paya Lang Estate between Gemas and Batu Anam. As the Japanese attempted to outflank the Allied positions west of Gemas at Muar, after the 2/30th Battalion conducted a successful ambush, Westforce began the withdrawal back to Singapore Island, during which the 2/26th Battalion took part in a number of rearguard actions. Actions were fought at the Namazi Estate, Forty-Mile Peg and the Thirty-One Mile Peg. Of these, perhaps the most significant came at the Thirty-One Mile Peg, where 16 Platoon, under Lieutenant William Magarry, conducted a bayonet charge near Ayer Hitam. They crossed the Strait on 30 January and along with the rest of the 27th Brigade took up positions in the defence of the Causeway in anticipation of the Japanese assault which came a week later on 8 February 1942.

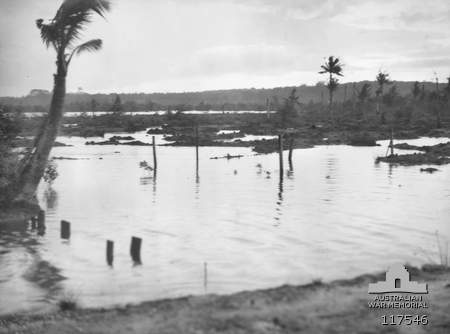
The position occupied by 'B' Company on Singapore in late January and early February 1942.

After being subjected to heavy aerial and artillery bombardment, the following day the battalion's commanding officer, Arthur Boyes, handed over command to Lieutenant Colonel Roland Oakes, formerly the second in command of the 2/19th Battalion. Boyes was called away to help organise the island's rear area defence and was subsequently given command of 'X' Battalion, a composite unit made up of reinforcements that had been separated from their units. Shortly after taking up this appointment, however, Boyes was killed along with a number of his men when the battalion was ambushed while attempting to fill a gap in the lines that had resulted from a Japanese breakthrough.

On 10 February, the 2/26th Battalion moved into position on 4,000 yards (3,700 m) frontage between Bukit Mandai and Bukit Panjang, with each of its companies on top of a high feature, separated by 1,000 yards (910 m) gaps of dense bush. Over the course of the next week, the 2/26th fought to defend the island, however, by 15 February, the Allied defence had crumbled and Lieutenant General Arthur Percival, the general officer in command of British Empire troops in Malaya, announced that the garrison would surrender. Following this, men from the 2/26th Battalion were detained at Changi Prison until May 1942 when they were dispersed to different locations throughout the Pacific—Burma, Thailand, Borneo and Japan—where they were used as slave labour by the Japanese. They spent the next three and a half years as prisoners of war until the war came to an end, when they were liberated and repatriated back to Australia.

Casualties included 432 men killed in action or died in captivity, 136 wounded and 1,157 prisoners of war. Members of the battalion received the following decorations: one Military Cross, one Distinguished Conduct Medal and 15 Mentions in Despatches.

== Battle honours ==
For its service during the Second World War, the 2/26th Battalion was awarded the following battle honours:

- Malaya 1941–1942, Johore and Singapore Island.

== Commanding officers ==
The following officers commanded the 2/26th during the war:

- Lieutenant Colonel Arthur Harold 'Sapper' Boyes
- Major Charles Patrick Tracey
