= Canberra Theatre Centre =

Performing arts venue in Canberra, Australia

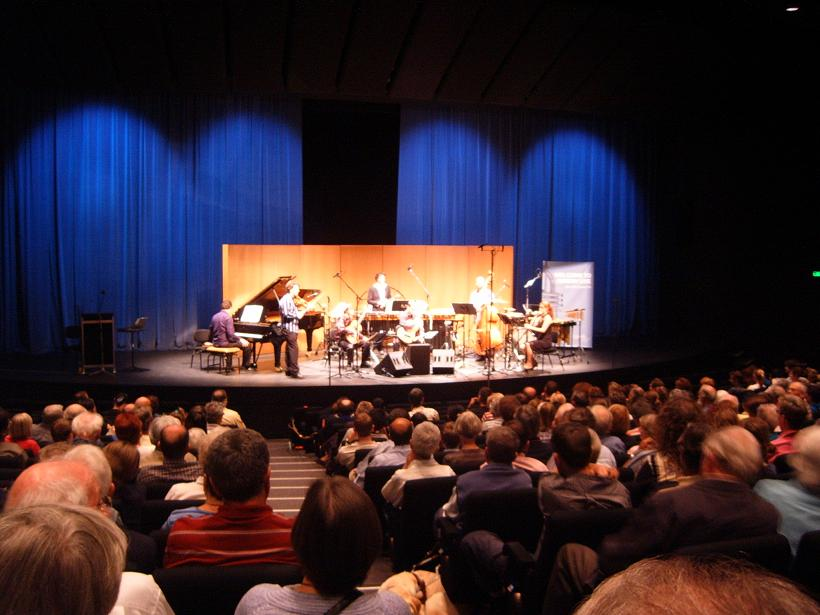
- ABC Classic FM live concert, Canberra Theatre; Artists: dominantSEVEN; April 2007
- Interactive map of Canberra Theatre Centre
- Location: Canberra's City Centre
- Coordinates: 35.2818°S 149.1305°E
- Seating type: Theatre: lyric theatre; The Playhouse: 3 levels; The Courtyard Studio: studio
- Capacity: Theatre: 1,244; The Playhouse: 618; The Courtyard Studio: 100

Construction
- Opened: 24 June 1965
- Architect: Yuncken Freeman

Website
- canberratheatrecentre.com.au

Canberra Theatre Centre (CTC), also known as the Canberra Theatre, is the Australian Capital Territory’s central performing arts venue and Australia's first performing arts centre, the first Australian Government initiated performing arts centre to be completed. It opened on 24 June 1965 with a gala performance by the Australian Ballet.

The centre is sited in the heart of Canberra city centre, beside the ACT Legislative Assembly and backing onto City Hill, one of the apexes of the Parliamentary Triangle.

== Centre history ==
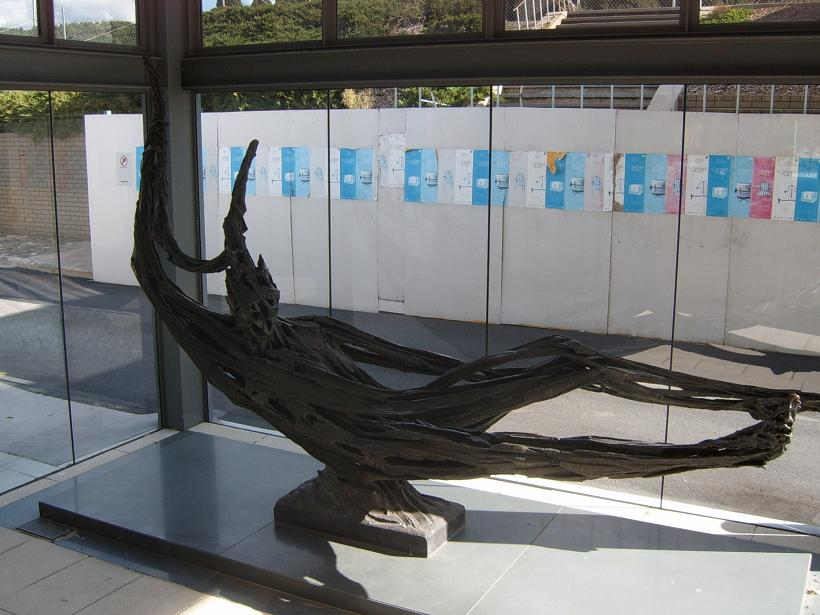
Thespis (1965), sculpture by Robert Cook, commissioned for the opening of the Canberra Theatre

Originally the complex was two separate buildings: the Canberra Theatre and The Playhouse, which were linked by a covered walkway.

The Canberra Theatre was built as a 1,200 seat lyric theatre to house national and international touring companies; The Playhouse had 310 seats and was designed for local arts companies and for smaller scale touring companies. The Playhouse also contained a small visual art gallery, a meeting room and a restaurant,

1965: The Playhouse was officially opened on 18 August 1965 with a production of Peter Ustinov’s Romanoff and Juliet, produced by the Canberra Repertory Society.

1971: The covered walkway linking the two venues was enclosed to create more foyer and function space for the Canberra Theatre and improved box office facilities.

1975: The Playhouse was given improved backstage storage space, wardrobe facilities and addition dressing rooms.

1982: The Courtyard Studio - a rehearsal room/cum 90-seat venue, administration offices, and a scene construction workshop including an electrically operated paint frame (used for painting stage set canvases), were completed. The Centre boasts one of the very few paint frames in Australia.

1988: The Canberra Theatre auditorium, foyer and link were extensively refurbished so that the facilities were comparable to those of other major performing arts centres throughout the country.

1998: The rebuilt Playhouse opened.

2006: A new library was built between the Canberra Theatre and the Playhouse, as well as a foyer linking the two theatres.

2007: The foyer and dressing rooms to the Courtyard Studio were refurbished. In addition lift access to the first floor Administration offices was installed

=== Refurbishment ===
From the mid-1990s a two-year consultation process occurred between the Canberra Theatre Centre staff and the architects leading to the demolition of The Playhouse and its rebuilding as a new venue. It had a 'soft' opening in April 1998. The official opening was 16 May 1998.

Instead of a conventional fan shaped auditorium and proscenium arch stage used in most Australian theatres built in the 20th century, the design has the form of a semi circular drum with seating in the stalls and two balconies, with 'boxes'. The capacity is 618 seats. The design is reminiscent of theatres in Greece of antiquity and the Elizabethan theatres of the late 16th century.

The theatre has dressing rooms on two levels, wardrobe, a green room, a reception room and the foyer (with bar and cafe), which wraps around the drum.

=== New lyric theatre ===
A new lyric theatre, with a capacity of 2000 seats, is being built to the north west of the current theatre buildings. Construction commenced in October 2025, and the new theatre is expected to be open in 2028.

== Notable performances ==
=== Canberra Theatre ===
Dame Margot Fonteyn performed with the Australian Ballet at the centre in October 1970. From the mid-1970s to the mid-1980s many international artists performed, including Dame Joan Sutherland. Canberra Opera presented a full-scale production of La Traviata and the Canberra Theatre Trust presented a performance of Gilbert and Sullivan's HMS Pinafore. Other performers during this time included the Bell Shakespeare Company, the Black Light Theatre of Prague and the Dave Brubeck Quartet. The Whitlams used the theatre during their early Australian tours in the early 2000s, and the Aboriginal Bangarra Dance Theatre performed here in 2006.

In recent years, the Canberra Theatre has housed several successful productions by Canberra-based Free Rain Theatre Company. These pro-am musical productions include Canberra premiers of The Phantom of the Opera in 2013, Mary Poppins in 2015, and both The Little Mermaid and Wicked in 2016.

=== The Playhouse ===
Local companies to use the Playhouse have included Canberra Opera; Prompt Theatre; choreographer Meryl Tankard's Company; The Theatre Players; Canberra Dance Ensemble; National Music Theatre; Canberra Little Theatre; Canberra Children's Theatre; Stage Craft for Singers; Canberra Gang Show; Canberra Comedy Theatre Company; Jigsaw Theatre Company. For several years the Woden Valley Youth Choir presented their annual concert there. The Playhouse has been used for conventions, meetings, including naturalisation ceremonies by the Department of Immigration.

The Playhouse has also housed productions by visiting companies. These included Rosencrantz and Guildenstern are Dead from the Old Tote Theatre Company; Dennis Olsen in Percy and Rose; David Williamson plays Travelling North and Sanctuary; Melbourne Theatre Company; chamber music concerts by Musica Viva and others; Robyn Archer in A Star is Torn; Pam Ayres; Googie Withers; productions by NIDA; various Bell Shakespeare Company performances (John Bell); pianist David Helfgott; as well as various comedians and entertainers.

=== The Courtyard Studio ===
The Courtyard Studio is Canberra Theatre Centre's boutique, studio performance space that doubles as a venue for rehearsals, entertaining, corporate functions / meetings, exhibition space, and as a performance space. The Courtyard Studio can seat up to 90 people comfortably for a performance. For entertaining it can seat 100 and for cocktail parties it has a capacity of 140 people.
