= 2/4th Commando Squadron (Australia) =

- Active: 1941–1946
- Disbanded: 8 January 1946
- Country: Australia
- Branch: Australian Army
- Type: Commando
- Size: 17 officers, 256 men
- Part of: 2/9th Cavalry Commando Regiment (HQ), attached to 9th Australian Division
- Double diamonds: Dark blue
- Engagements: Second World War: Battle of Timor; Salamaua-Lae campaign; Huon Peninsula campaign; Battle of Tarakan

Commanders
- Notable commanders: Major Kevin Garvey; Major Edward Walker

Insignia
- Unit colour patch

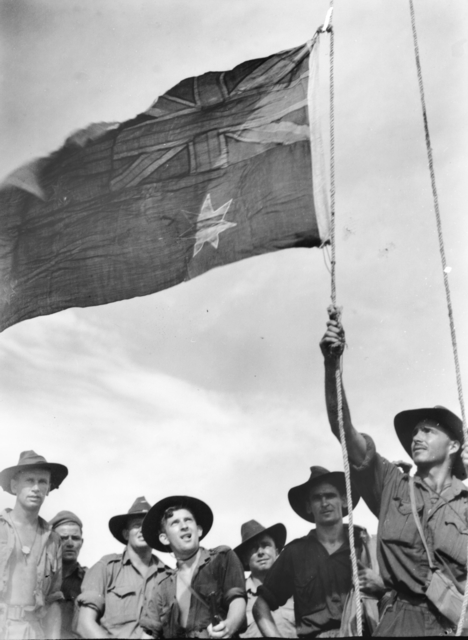
Members of the Australian 2/4th Cavalry Commando Squadron raise the Australian flag over Sadau Island on 30 April 1945. This was the first time Australian troops had captured non-Australian territory during the Pacific War in WW II.

The 2/4th Commando Squadron was one of 12 independent companies and commando squadrons raised by the Australian Army during the Second World War. Raised in August 1941, it was disbanded not long after due to conceptual problems, but it was quickly reformed following the entry of Japan into the war in December 1941. After a period of about six months performing garrison duties in northern Australia, the 2/4th was deployed to Portuguese Timor to reinforce the other Australian units already waging a guerrilla war on the island. After a brief campaign the 2/4th was returned to Australia and from there it went on to serve in New Guinea in 1943, taking part in the Salamaua-Lae campaign attached to the 9th Division. Later, the squadron was involved in one of the last campaigns of the war when it landed on Tarakan Island in May 1945 and took part in the Borneo campaign. Following the end of hostilities, the 2/4th returned to Australia and was disbanded at Ingleburn, New South Wales, on 8 January 1946.

== History ==
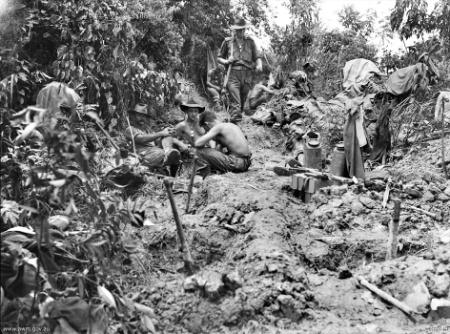
Members of the Australian 2/4th Cavalry Commando Squadron on Tarakan Ridge.

The unit was initially formed as "No. 4 Independent Company" in August 1941, but it was disbanded in October due to conceptual problems within the Australian Army surrounding the role that the 4th and other such companies could fill in the strategic situation at that time. The Company was reformed in late December 1941 following the outbreak of the Pacific War. This time it was known as "2/4th Independent Company". After completing its training at the Guerrilla Warfare School at Foster, on Wilsons Promontory, Victoria, the 2/4th was posted to the Katherine, Northern Territory, in March 1942 where it undertook garrison duties. Following the bombing of Darwin this became an operation role and during this time the 2/4th deployed a number of small groups between the McArthur and the Ord Rivers, where they were to harass any Japanese forces which might have landed there. This never eventuated, though, and in August the 2/4th moved to the town of Adelaide River, Northern Territory.

In September the 2/4th Independent Company returned to Darwin and from there they were deployed to Portuguese Timor (now East Timor) on HMAS Voyager to reinforce the 2/2nd Independent Company, which was at that time conducting a guerrilla campaign on the island with the assistance of the local population. Over the course of four months, the company carried out a number of successful operations on Timor, including many successful ambushes, dynamiting of bridges and roads, as well as manning two observation posts in the mountains outside Dili where they reported the movements of Japanese ships and aircraft. This lasted until January 1943 when, due to the deteriorating situation, the decision was made to withdraw the force from the island and bring them back to Australia. Their success demonstrated what could be achieved by such a force behind enemy lines and it was used later as a model for the formation of the Australian Special Air Service after the war.

The company returned to Australia and was reformed at the Jungle Warfare School at Canungra, Queensland, in April 1943 where it received reinforcements and new equipment. From there, they were moved to Wongabel on the Atherton Tablelands. It was during this time that the Australian Army began to re-organise the independent companies, as part of its larger army-wide re-organisation as it began to prepare itself for the jungle campaigns that it would fight over the next two years. As a part of this re-organisation, the independent companies were amalgamated together under a regimental headquarters that would administer the companies. These headquarters units were formed using the cavalry regiments of the 6th, 7th and 9th Divisions and as such, in October, although at that time currently overseas again, the 2/4th Independent Company was redesignated the "2/4th Cavalry (Commando) Squadron" as it became a part of the 2/7th Cavalry Commando Regiment, attached to the 7th Division. This name would later be shortened simply to "2/4th Commando Squadron" in 1944.

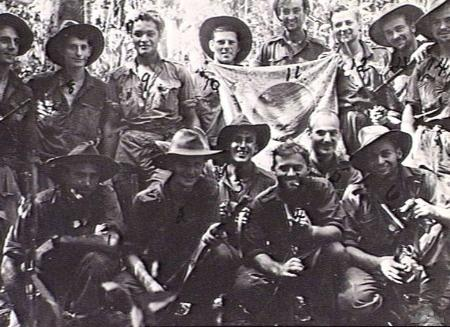
Members of the Australian 2/4th Commando Squadron on Tarakan Island in June 1945

In August 1943, the 2/4th was deployed to New Guinea, arriving at Milne Bay where they were placed under the command of the 9th Division, attached to the 26th Brigade. On 4 September, the 2/4th participated in Australia's first amphibious landing since Gallipoli when they landed at Lae during the Salamaua-Lae campaign. The 2/4th came ashore in the second wave of the landing, suffering heavy losses with thirty-four men being killed or missing when their Landing Ship Tank was attacked by Japanese dive and torpedo bombers. After the landing, the 2/4th began reconnaissance and flank protection operations for the 26th Brigade until 30 October, when Lae finally fell and they were sent by barge to reinforce the 20th Brigade at Finschhafen in the clearing of the Huon Peninsula. During this time the 2/4th conducted numerous long range patrols, often being sent ahead of the main advance, before finally being removed from the line at the end of February 1944 and being sent back to Australia for leave.

Upon its return to Australia, the 2/4th regrouped at Ravenshoe, Queensland, where in March 1944 it became part of the 2/9th Cavalry Commando Regiment and was officially attached to the 9th Division with whom it had served during the recently concluded operations in New Guinea. The squadron then experienced a hiatus from operations for over a year, during which time it conducted numerous training exercises in northern Queensland, before embarking from Townsville and sailing to Morotai in April 1945. From here the squadron took part in the landings at Tarakan Island off Borneo as part of the "Oboe" operations. Throughout May and June the 2/4th played an important role in the campaign. The landing on Sadau Island was unopposed and a few days later on 3 May at Tarakan it was once again tasked to act in support of the 26th Brigade. In the coming days and weeks the 2/4th saw extensive service during the liberation of Tarakan, suffering heavy casualties with four officers and fifty-two other ranks being killed or wounded in this time.

This was the squadron's last operation and following its return to Australia it was disbanded at Ingleburn, New South Wales, on 8 January 1946. During its service the 2/4th lost 68 men killed in action or died on active service. Five members were awarded the Military Medal, while 15 were Mentioned in Despatches.

== Commanding officers ==
- Major Kevin Boyd Garvey
- Major Edward McDonald Walker.
