= A Town Like Alice (miniseries) =

1981 Australian television series

- Based on: Novel by Nevil Shute
- Written by: Tom Hegarty; Rosemary Anne Sisson
- Directed by: David Stevens
- Starring: Helen Morse; Bryan Brown; Gordon Jackson
- Theme music composer: Bruce Smeaton
- Country of origin: Australia
- Original language: English
- No. of episodes: 3 x 1 hour 45 minutes.

Production
- Producer: Henry Crawford
- Running time: 301 mins
- Production companies: Mariner Films; Australian Film Commission; Victorian Film
- Budget: $1.25 million

Original release
- Network: Seven Network
- Release: 4 October – 18 October 1981

A Town Like Alice is a five-hour 1981 Australian television adaptation of Nevil Shute's novel of the same name. Produced by the Seven Network, and directed by David Stevens, it was the second major adaptation of the book.

In the United States it was shown on PBS under the Masterpiece Theatre banner, a rare non-British production to be so aired.

== Cast ==
Major characters

- Helen Morse as Jean Paget
- Bryan Brown as Joe Harman
- Gordon Jackson as Noel Strachan
- Dorothy Alison as Mrs. Frith (ep. 1–2)
- Yuki Shimoda as Sergeant Mifune (ep. 1–2)

Secondary cast

- Anna Volska as Sally (ep. 1–2)
- Jennifer West as Mrs. Horsefall (ep. 1)
- Pat Evison as Mrs. Collard (ep. 1)
- Melissa Crawford as Robyn (ep. 1–2)
- Lucy Bell as Jane Holland (ep. 1)
- Sean Hinton as Freddie (ep. 1)
- Debbie Baile as Audrey (ep. 1)
- Rebecca Marshall as Rita (ep. 1–2)
- Mandy Boocock as Marlene (ep. 1–2)
- Crispian Ashby as Johnny (ep. 1–2)
- Cecily Polson as Eileen Holland (ep. 1)
- John Lee as Lester
- John Howard as Donald, Jean's brother (ep. 1)
- Donald MacDonald as Derek Wilson-Hayes (ep. 1–2)
- Hatsuo Uda as Captain Yoniata (ep. 1)
- Richard Narita as Captain Sugamo (ep. 1–2)
- Akio Fukuwa as Japanese Lieutenant (ep. 1)
- Lim Beng Chook as Major Nemu (ep. 1)
- Ken Brown as Ben Leggatt, Joe's mate (ep. 1)
- Antony Groser as McFadden (ep. 1)
- Patrick Dison as Tommy Smythe (ep. 1)
- Hiro Shimada as Mifune's Guard (ep. 1)
- Ann Hinton (ep. 1), Betty Benfield (ep. 1), Liz Marshall (ep. 1–2) & Cynthia Boocock (ep. 2) as Trek Women
- Samantha Rebillet (ep. 1–2) & Simon Hinton (ep. 1) as Trek Children
- Zain Ariff as Village Headman (ep. 2)
- Zainal Aziz as Well Digger (ep. 2)
- John Allen as Bill Holland (ep. 2)
- Joan Lord as Miss Carter (ep. 2–3)
- Maggie Dence as Mrs. O'Connor (ep. 2–3)
- Lorna Lesley as Rose Sawyer (ep. 2–3)
- Maurie Fields as Al Burns (ep. 2–3)
- Arkie Whiteley as Annie (ep. 2–3)
- Lois Ramsey as Mrs. Driver (ep. 2)
- Isobel Kirk as Mrs. Duveen (ep. 2)
- Tommy Lewis as Bourneville (ep. 2–3)
- Sydney Heylen as Art Foster (ep. 2)
- Peter Kowitz as TAA Pilot (ep. 2)
- Ross Thompson as Beechcraft Pilot (ep. 2)
- Robert Noble as Dragon Pilot (ep. 2)
- Gareth Wilding-Forbes as Pub Customer (ep. 2)
- Paul Thompson & Stephen Wheatley as Opera Singers (ep. 2)
- Palm Court Orchestra as String Quartet (ep. 2)
- Peter Collingwood as Dr. Kennedy (ep. 3)
- Tim McKenzie as Pete (ep. 3)
- Steve Bisley as Tim Whelan (ep. 3)
- Ed Turley as Police Sergeant (ep. 3)
- Anne Haddy as Aggie Topp (ep. 3)
- Peter Paulsen as Flying Doctor Pilot (ep. 3)
- Derek Wyness as Don Curtis (ep. 3)
- Gertrude Treloar as Palmolive (ep. 3)
- Gary Priest as Bush Brother (ep. 3)
- Fred Peter as Mr. Watkins (ep. 3)
- Lofty Cannard as Crocodile Shooter (ep. 3)

== Changes from the book ==
While generally faithful to the original book, there are several notable differences, the most significant right at the end.

- In Malaya, Jean learns of the Japanese invasion while at a party, rather than while working in her Kuala Lumpur office, and evacuates by truck from there, not from a friend's house.
- There are noticeably fewer women and children who make, and survive, the walk, than the 30 and 17 respectively in the book.
- In Kuantan, Joe is nailed to a outbuilding door, not to a tree.
- In Willstown, after Jean dresses down the bank manager for his fly-ridden office, Joe does not tell her that the manager has ordered gallons of DDT; rather he tells Jean she is stirring up resentment in the town, and should not be trying to teach the locals how to live; they argue, and each declares they no longer want to marry.
- Receiving a letter from Jean about the apparent break-up, Noel is knocked down in the street by a taxi, but then decides to fly out to Willstown, taking Jean's ice skates with him, in the hope she will return to England with him.
- Joe and Jean are married in a church (in the book, the town had no church until after Jean's several businesses), with Noel giving Jean away. At the reception, Noel toasts the bride and groom, and reads out two congratulatory telegrams from Malaya: from Sally and Derek Wilson-Hayes, and from Mrs Renee Frith. There is no explanation as to who told them of the wedding (presumably Jean has maintained contact with them both by letter).

== Production ==
It was the most expensive Australian television series at the time. It was filmed on location in England, Malaysia and western New South Wales.

== Reception ==
The series was a huge ratings success in Australia, getting a 49% viewing share.

== Awards ==
The series won an International Emmy Award for drama in 1981 and won a Logie Award in the Best Single Drama or Mini Series category at the 1982 awards with Morse, Brown and Jackson winning Logies for their performances.
