= Bell Shakespeare =

Australian theatre company

- Founded: 1990
- Founder: John Bell
- Headquarters: Sydney, Australia
- Key people: Peter Evans (artistic director), Gill Perkins (executive director)
- Products: Theatre productions, learning programs
- Website: bellshakespeare.com.au

Bell Shakespeare is an Australian theatre company specialising in the works of William Shakespeare, his contemporaries and other classics. Founded by actor John Bell and based in Sydney, it is Australia's only national theatre company. Apart from a program of performances, the company also conducts learning programs.

== Company history ==
Founded by John Bell in 1990, Bell Shakespeare began as a theatre company dedicated to producing the plays of William Shakespeare in a way that was relevant and exciting to Australian audiences. With the support of an enlightened philanthropist, the late Tony Gilbert AM, and a small number of imaginative corporate and private supporters, Bell Shakespeare was able to mount productions and attract audiences.

Bell Shakespeare is listed as a Major Festival in the book Shakespeare Festivals Around the World.

In 2016, the Australian Federal Government announced a $1 million contribution to the Bell Shakespeare capital campaign, which will help the Company secure a permanent home at Sydney's Pier 2/3, Walsh Bay called The Neilson Nutshell.

In 2012, John Bell announced the promotion of associate artistic director Peter Evans to the position of co-artistic director. In 2015, John Bell retired from the company, and Peter Evans was made sole artistic director. Bell's final play for the company was The Tempest, thought to be one of the last plays Shakespeare wrote alone.

== Description and governance ==
Bell Shakespeare is Australia's only national theatre company. One of the company's artistic goals is "to use Shakespeare as Australians", and Bell Shakespeare is well known for using contemporary styles to make Shakespeare accessible for modern audiences.

Each year they perform a mainstage season consisting of three theatre productions, including an annual national tour, and a learning program to support students, teachers and communities nationally. Peter Evans has held the position of artistic director of Bell Shakespeare since 2015, and the company's executive director is Gill Perkins.

== Learning ==
Bell Shakespeare has a range of learning opportunities for students and teachers in every Australian state and territory throughout the year. This includes in-school performances by The Players. Inspired by the troupe of actors who appear in Hamlet, Bell Shakespeare's Players have been performing abridged adaptions of Shakespeare's works in schools since 1991. A number of tailored workshops, masterclasses and residencies are also available to make Shakespeare accessible to students in an immersive and fun way. Each year, the company creates a theatre production specifically for students. Bell Shakespeare also provides professional learning for teachers.

A range of scholarships to support students and teachers are also provided. This includes the John Bell Scholarship, which provides a once-in-a-lifetime opportunity for students living in regional or remote areas who are interested in a career as a performer, and the regional teacher mentorship which is a fully funded year-long mentorship for teachers in regional, rural and remote Australian schools.

== Facilities ==
The main studio and theatre space is at Bell Shakespeare's premises is The Neilson Nutshell, which is available for hire.

== Productions ==
=== Recent productions ===
- Hamlet (2015), directed by Damien Ryan and starring Josh McConville.
- Romeo and Juliet (2016), directed by Peter Evans and starring Kelly Paterniti and Alex Williams.
- Othello (2016), directed by Peter Evans and starring Ray Chong Nee and Yalin Ozucelik.
- The Literati (2016), directed by Lee Lewis and starring Kate Mulvany and Miranda Tapsell.
- Richard 3 (2017), directed by Peter Evans and starring Kate Mulvany.
- The Merchant Of Venice (2017), directed by Anne-Louise Sarks and starring Mitchell Butel and Jessica Tovey.
- Antony and Cleopatra (2018), directed by Peter Evans and starring Catherine McClements.
- Julius Caesar (2018), directed by James Evans and starring Kenneth Ransom.
- The Misanthrope (2018), directed by Lee Lewis and starring Danielle Cormack.
- The Miser (2019), directed by Peter Evans and starring John Bell.
- Much Ado About Nothing (2019), directed by James Evans and starring Zindzi Okenyo.
- Titus Andronicus (2019), directed by Adena Jacobs and starring Jane Montgomery Griffiths and Melita Jurisic.
- Hamlet (2020), directed by Peter Evans and starring Harriet Gordon-Anderson and Lisa McCune.
- A Midsummer Night's Dream (2021), directed by Peter Evans and starring Jane Montgomery Griffiths and Gabrielle Scawthorn.
- The Lovers (2022), Bell Shakespeare's first musical, based on A Midsummer Night's Dream, by Laura Murphy and directed by Shaun Rennie.
- Mackenzie (2026), a new play with 5 songs, based on Macbeth, by Yve Blake and directed by Virginia Gay

=== Production history by play ===
List of Bell Shakespeare productions (not including Learning productions or special events):

==== Shakespeare ====
- Antony and Cleopatra (2001, 2018)
- As You Like It (2003, 2018, 2015)
- The Comedy of Errors (2002, 2013)
- Coriolanus (1996, 2025)
- Hamlet (1991, 2003, 2008, 2015, 2020, 2022)
- Henry IV [Henry IV, Part 1; Henry IV, Part 2] (1988, 2013)
- Henry V (1999, 2014, 2025)
- Julius Caesar (2001, 2011, 2018, 2026)
- King Lear (1998, 2010)
- Macbeth (1994, 1997, 2007, 2012, 2023, 2026)
- Measure for Measure (2005)
- The Merchant of Venice (1991, 1999, 2006, 2017)
- A Midsummer Night's Dream (2000, 2004, 2014, 2021)
- Much Ado About Nothing (1996, 2000, 2011, 2018)
- Othello (2007, 2016)
- Pericles (1995, 2009)
- Richard III (1992, 2002, 2017)
- Romeo and Juliet (1993, 1999, 2006, 2016, 2023)
- The Taming of the Shrew (1994, 2002, 2009)
- The Tempest (1997, 2001, 2006, 2015)
- Titus Andronicus (2019)
- Troilus and Cressida (2000)
- Twelfth Night (1995, 2004, 2010, 2023)
- The Two Gentlemen of Verona (2005)
- Wars of the Roses [Henry VI, Part 1; Henry VI, Part 2; Henry VI, Part 3] (2005)
- The Winter's Tale (1997, 2014)
- Venus and Adonis (2008)

==== Other ====
- Long Day's Journey into Night (1999)
- Dance of Death (2000)
- Shakespeare's R & J (2001)
- The Servant of Two Masters (2003)
- Moby Dick (2005)
- The Government Inspector (2007)
- Anatomy Titus Fall of Rome: A Shakespeare Commentary (2008)
- The Alchemist (2009)
- Faustus (2011)
- The Duchess of Malfi (2012)
- The School for Wives (2012)
- Phèdre (2013)
- Tartuffe (2014)
- The Literati (2016)
- The Misanthrope (2018)
- The Miser (2019)
- One Man in His Time (2021)
- In a Nutshell (2022)
- The Lovers (2022), based on A Midsummer Night's Dream
- Mackenzie (2026), based on Macbeth
