= AWGIE Award for Music Theatre =

The AWGIE Award for Music Theatre is awarded by the Australian Writers Guild at the annual AWGIE Awards for Australian performance writing.

The award is for the script/text, lyrics or book of works written for the theatre in which music plays an integral part, such as opera libretti, musicals, revue, musical theatre, theatre restaurant and original cabaret. To be eligible, works must have had their first formal production in the previous year.

Year	Recipient Writer(s)	Recipient Work	Nominees	Ref(s)
2003	Hilary Bell	The Anatomy Lesson of Doctor Ruysch	-	
2004	Jonathan Biggins with Ignatius Jones & Philip Scott	Orpheus in the Underworld	Dean Bryant for Jumpin' the Q	
2005	Jonathan Biggins, Drew Forsythe & Phil Scott	The Republic of Myopia	-	
2006	Melvyn Morrow	Shakespearean Idol	Melvyn Morrow with John Michael Howson and David Mitchell for Dusty	
2007	Janis Balodis	Electric Lenin	Melissa Reeves for Tough Girls	
2008	Sean Peter	Everything’s Fucked	-	
2009	Not awarded			
2010	Sue Smith	Rembrandt’s Wife	Tracy Harvey and Doug Macleod for Call Girl the Musical	
2011	Cathryn Strickland	The Musical Child	Sarah Carradine for The Cockatoos	
2012	Not awarded			
2013	Not awarded			
2014	Not awarded			
2015	Nicki Bloom	Little Bird	-	
2016	Lally Katz	The Rabbits	-	
2017	Danny Ginges with Philip Foxman	Atomic	-	
2018	PJ Hogan with Kate Miller-Heidke & Keir Nuttall (lyrics) and Benny Andersson, Björn Ulvaeus & Stig Anderson (lyrics)	Muriel's Wedding the Musical	Alana Valentine with Ursula Yovich for Barbara and the Camp Dogs; Stephen Vizard for Vigil	
2019	Not awarded			
2020	Yve Blake	Fangirls	Alana Valentine for Flight Memory; Justin Fleming for Whiteley	
2021	Alana Valentine	Notre-Dame	-	
2022	Not awarded			
2024	Alana Valentine and Christos Tsiolkas	Watershed: The Death of Dr Duncan	Daniel Cullen with James Cullen for Dubbo Championship Wrestling	
2025	Blake Erickson and Jay James-Moody (book), Laura Murphy (lyrics and music)	The Dismissal: An Extremely Serious Musical Comedy	Jules Orcullo for Forgetting Tim Minchin; Christine Evans for Three Marys	
2026	Sheridan Harbridge and Dean Bryant with Mathew Frank	My Brilliant Career	Van Badham and Richard Wise for The Questions	
