= Sharon Millerchip =

Australian actress, dancer, and director

- Born: Davidson, New South Wales, Australia
- Education: Davidson High School
- Occupations: Actress; singer; dancer; director; choreographer
- Website: https://www.sharonmillerchip.com

Sharon Millerchip is an Australian actress, dancer, director, and choreographer, best known for her performances in major musical theatre productions.

Millerchip grew up in Davidson, New South Wales and attended Kambora Public School and Davidson High School, where she participated in the dance program. Growing up, she attended Johnny Young Talent School, and during high school, she performed with the Forest Youth Theatre Company. After enrolling in college for dance, she auditioned for and was accepted into the Australian of production of Cats. She understudied several roles before she took over the role of Demeter.

Millerchip played Meg Giry in the original Australian production of The Phantom of the Opera. She also originated the role of Little Red Ridinghood in the Sydney Theatre Company production of Into the Woods opposite Philip Quast as the Big Bad Wolf/Cinderella’s Prince.

Further Sydney Theatre Company credits include originating the role of Cordelia in Falsettos,

In the mid to late 1990s, she took over major roles in long-running Australian productions of West Side Story as Anita (replacing Caroline O'Connor), Beauty and the Beast as Belle (replacing Rachael Beck) and Chicago as Velma Kelly (replacing O'Connor). In 2011, she played Meg Giry in the Australian production of Love Never Dies, the sequel to The Phantom of the Opera. Two years later, she performed in Bombshells at the Ensemble Theatre. In 2019, she originated the role of Caroline in the new Australian musical FANGIRLS at the Belvoir St Theatre. She appears on the FANGIRLS: World Premiere Cast Recording album, which was released on April 30, 2021.

In addition to performing in shows, Millerchip has also directed several shows, including Aladdin and Strictly Ballroom. She is currently the associate director for the Australian tour production of Six.

== Filmography ==
=== Film ===
Date	Title	Role	Type
1985	The Perfectionist	Young babysitter	TV movie
2011	Jimmy and Gret Don't Do Sex	Toulah	Feature film
2012	Kath & Kimderella	Wendy	Feature film
2012	Devine is Dead	Tilly Devine	Short film

=== Television ===
Date	Title	Role	Type
	Earthwatch	Reporter (age 10)	TV series
1985	Winners	Amanda	TV series, 1 episode
1987	Sons and Daughters	Penny Burgess	TV series, 1 episode
1987	Willing and Abel		TV series, 1 episode
1990	Home and Away	Selena Blake	TV series, 1 episode
2009-13	Zigby	Celeen the Hippo (voice)	Animated TV series, 52 episodes
2010	Cops L.A.C.	Fiona	TV series, 1 episode
2011	Spicks and Specks	Guest	TV series, 1 episode
	The Circle		TV series

=== TVC Voiceover ===
Title
Qantas
Aldi
Commonwealth Bank

== Theatre ==
=== Acting ===
Date	Title	Role	Notes
	Mission Thraxonia	Roller-skating robot, NPA	Her Majesty's Theatre, Sydney
1989	Cats	Demeter	His Majesty's Theatre, Perth, Festival Theatre, Adelaide, Melbourne season & Australia/New Zealand tour
1990	The Hunting of the Snark		The Hills Centre, Castle Hill
1990 / 1993	The Phantom of the Opera	Meg Giry	Princess Theatre, Melbourne (1990) & Theatre Royal, Sydney (1993)
1992-93	Into the Woods	Little Red Ridinghood	Sydney Theatre Company at Sydney Opera House & State Theatre, Melbourne
1992-93	Combo Fiasco	Herself/performer	Cabaret trio act at Ti Amo Restaurant, South Bank, Capers Cabaret, Hawthorn, Elura, North Melbourne, Mardi Gras Festival Club, Queanbeyan School of Arts Cafe, Tilbury Hotel, Woolloomooloo. Nominated for MAC Award for Best Vocal Comedy Act (New York)
1994	Falsettos	Cordelia	Sydney Opera House, Monash University, Theatre Royal, Hobart, Canberra Theatre for Sydney Theatre Company
1994	Oscar's Turn to Sing		Sydney Opera House
1995	West Side Story	Anita	Lyric Theatre & Capitol Theatre for IMG
1995-96	Beauty and the Beast	Belle	Her Majesty's Theatre, Sydney for Disney Theatrical Productions. Won a Mo Award
1998	A One Night Stand with the stars of Australian musical theatre	Herself/performer	Melbourne Concert Hall
2001	Chicago	Velma Kelly	IMG. Won Helpmann Award
2003	They're Playing Our Song	Sonia Walsk	State Theatre, Melbourne for The Production Company
2004	Australia's Leading Ladies	Herself/performer	Concert Hall, South Bank for Collier-Vickers Productions
2004	Kooky Tunes	Various characters	Chapel Off Chapel & Bar Me, Kings Cross for Showtune Productions
2004	Satango	Sofia	Stables Theatre for Griffin Theatre Company. Australian Dance Award
2005	Somewhere	Lilly Manly	Q Theatre, Penrith
2005	In the Raw : The Europeans / September / The Windows Project		Darlinghurst Theatre
2005	The Wild Party	May	Adelaide Cabaret Festival
2007	Pippin	Catherine	Sydney Theatre, Kookaburra. Nominated for Helpmann Award
2007	Sweet Charity	Charity Hope Valentine	The Production Company for State Theatre, Melbourne. Nominated for Helpmann Award
2008	The Rocky Horror Show	Columbia	Star Theatre, Comedy Theatre, Melbourne; Won a Helpmann Award for Best Female Actor in a Supporting Role in a Musical
2008	Gala Concert	Herself/performer	Her Majesty's Theatre, Melbourne
2009	Chicago	Roxie Hart	Gordon Frost Productions; Won Helpmann Award; Won Sydney Theatre Award
2009	Hats Off!	Herself/performer	National Theatre, Melbourne fundraiser concert
2009	A Second Chance	Herself/performer	Chapel Off Chapel
2010	Last of the Red Hot Lovers	Elaine / Bobbi / Jeanette	Ensemble Theatre
2011	Love, Loss, and What I Wore		Sydney Opera House
2011-12	Love Never Dies	Meg Giry	Regent Theatre, Melbourne (2011), Capitol Theatre (2012) for Really Useful Company. Nominated for Sydney Theatre Award
2012	A Picasso	Miss Fisher	Ensemble Theatre
2012	Marlene Pop Diva	Marlene Dietrich	Dunstan Playhouse, Adelaide
2012	Kath & Kim	Wendy Patterson	RTP Productions
2013	My First Time	Various characters	Sydney Opera House
2013	Bombshells	Al 6 roles (one woman play)	Ensemble Theatre. Nominated for Sydney Theatre Award
2017	Around The World in 80 Days	Passepartout	Ellis Production
2018	Shirley Valentine	Shirley Valentine	Ensemble Theatre
2019	The Appleston Ladies Potato Race	Penny	Ensemble Theatre
2019	Small Mouth Sounds	Joan	Darlinghurst Theatre
2019 / 2021	FANGIRLS	Caroline	Australian tour starting at Belvoir St Theatre (2019). Seymour Centre, Playhouse, Melbourne, Playhouse, Canberra, IMB Theatre Wollongong, Ridley Centre SA, & regional Australian tour (2021). Also appears on FANGIRLS: World Premiere Cast Recording album (2021)
2022	North by Northwest	Maggie / Mrs Townsend	The Lyric Theatre, Sydney
2023	A Broadcast Coup	Louise	Sydney Festival & Ensemble Theatre

=== Directing ===
Date	Title	Role	Notes
2014	Strictly Ballroom	Resident Director	Lyric Theatre & Her Majesty's Theatre, Melbourne
2016-17	Aladdin	Resident Director & Resident Choreographer	Capitol Theatre, Sydney
2019	Cause Celeb: Actors’ Equity 75th Birthday Concert	Artist Liaison Co-Coordinator	Opera Centre, Surry Hills
2022	Fangirls	Associate Choreographer	Belvoir Theatre at Sydney Opera House
2022	North by Northwest	Associate Choreographer	Sydney Opera House
2023	Six	Associate Director	Sydney Opera House & Australian tour
2023	RBG; of Many One	Assistant Director	Sydney Theatre Company
2023	Becoming Eliza	Director	Sydney Opera House
	Inaugural Fundraiser Concert	Artist Liaison Co-Coordinator	Hayes Theatre

== Awards ==
Year	Award	Category	Nominated work	Role	Result
1992-93	MAC Awards	Best Vocal Comedy Act	Combo Fiasco		Nominated
1993	Mo Awards	Supporting Female Musical Theatre Performer of the Year	Into the Woods	Little Red Riding Hood	Won
1996	Mo Awards	Female Musical Theatre Performer of the Year	Beauty and the Beast	Belle	Won
2001	Helpmann Awards	Best Female Actor in a Musical	Chicago	Velma Kelly	Won
2004	Australian Dance Awards		Satango	Sofia	Nominated
2007	Helpmann Awards		Pippin	Catherine	Nominated
2007	Helpmann Awards		Sweet Charity	Charity Hope Valentine	Nominated
2009	Helpmann Awards	Best Female Actor in a Musical	Chicago	Roxie Hart	Won
2009	Sydney Theatre Awards		Chicago	Roxie Hart	Won
2008	Helpmann Awards	Best Female Actor in a Supporting Role in a Musical	The Rocky Horror Show	Columbia	Won
2011-12	Sydney Theatre Awards	Best Female Actress in a Supporting Role in a Musical	Love Never Dies	Meg Giry	Nominated
2013	Sydney Theatre Awards	Best Female Actress in a Lead Role in a Play	Bombshells		Nominated
