= Fangirls (musical) =

Australian stage musical by Yve Blake

- Official art of 2024 Lyric Hammersmith production
- Music: Yve Blake
- Lyrics: Yve Blake
- Book: Yve Blake
- Premiere: 7 September 2019, Queensland Theatre, Brisbane
- Productions: 2019 Australian tour 2021 Australian tour 2024 London
- Awards: AWGIE Award for Music Theatre; Sydney Theatre Award for Best Production of a Mainstage Musical

Fangirls is an Australian stage musical with book, music, and lyrics by Yve Blake. It concerns 14-year-old Edna, a diehard fan of the biggest boy band in the world, True Connection (a parody reference to One Direction), and its lead singer Harry. It was inspired by interviews with hundreds of teenage fangirls. The show examines and critiques the typical behaviors and motivations associated with fangirls, showing the darker, more obsessive, and potentially harmful aspects of intense fandom.

The original production premiered on 7 September 2019 at Queensland Theatre, before transferring to Belvoir St Theatre in Sydney on 12 October 2019. In 2021, Fangirls returned for a national tour of Australia.

Fangirls received critical acclaim. The musical won the Sydney Theatre Award for Best Production of a Musical, Matilda Award for Best Musical or Cabaret, and the 2020 AWGIE Award for Music Theatre. The world premiere cast recording was released in 2021 via Ghostlight Records. At the 2021 ARIA Music Awards, the album was nominated for Best Original Soundtrack or Musical Theatre Cast Album.

A London production co-produced by the Lyric Hammersmith and Sonia Friedman opened in July 2024.

== Background ==
In her 2019 TEDxSydney talk "For the Love of Fangirls", also known as "Why Are Fangirls Scary?", Yve Blake said that she was first inspired to write a musical about fangirls in 2015 when Zayn Malik abruptly departed the boy band One Direction. In the talk, Blake noted that mainstream media outlets were using mocking words like "hysterical" and "crazy" to describe the response of One Direction's fans to the news.

If girls grow up in a world where words like "crazy" and "psycho" and "hysterical" are casually used to describe female enthusiasm, then how does that shape the way that those girls get to see themselves? And if girls grow up in a world that tells them that they are designed just a bit crazier than the boys, then isn't that a little bit like telling them that they are born less capable of rationality than men, less capable of reason and unworthy of the same intellectual respect as their brothers?

Yve Blake began writing Fangirls in 2016 while in residence at the Australian Theatre for Young People, after being awarded the inaugural Rebel Wilson Theatermaker Scholarship.

== Synopsis ==
=== Act I ===
A teenage couple living on the run are almost discovered by a cop. Together, they kill her, and after disposing of the body in a nearby bin, turn to each other and begin a duet about their eternal love and devotion ("Let Them"). The couple are interrupted when Caroline, single mother and nurse, yells for her fourteen-year-old daughter Edna to come join her for dinner. It turns out that the girl from the couple is not in fact a fugitive, but Edna, a 14-year-old girl in the midst of an involved fantasy. Annoyed, Edna gets out of coming to dinner by insisting that she needs to study so she can keep her scholarship.

A global community of fans appear. They are all united in their love of the same pop star: a young man simply known as Harry. As it turns out, the boy in Edna's fantasy is the eighteen-year-old heartthrob-in-chief of True Connection, the biggest boyband in the world. The global fans sing about their love for Harry, but Edna believes that she is the only one who can truly see the 'real' him "hiding in plain sight". Edna believes that Harry is being forced by his management to take drugs like "Britney Spears" was to keep him in the band and is desperate for a way out of his life as a pop star ("Nobody").

In the school locker rooms, Edna meets up with her two best friends Jules and Brianna. Jules is hyper-focused on gaining a boyfriend, and Brianna is worried that nobody thinks she looks hot. After a fight with her best friend Jules in which Jules calls Edna "crazy" for thinking she'll end up with Harry, Edna is left alone after being ditched by both Jules and Brianna. Edna laments her changing friendship with Jules and Brianna, and sings of her determination to meet Harry and set him free in order to prove that everyone is wrong about her ("Wait and See").

Over dinner, Caroline tries to warn Edna against wasting her potential by spending so much time online obsessing over Harry. Annoyed, Edna excuses herself to go any do more "homework" in her room. Edna then logs on to a Fan Fiction forum to talk to her online best friend Saltypringl. In an attempt to cheer Edna up, Salty shares two of their juicy new stories ("Feels So True"). Edna asks Salty if her fanfiction about killing the cop is too "crazy", but Salty insists that it's perfect, and is, in fact "psychic". Salty goes on to explain that some fans have broken into Harry's hotel room and discovered an empty sheet of antidepressants in the trash, which confirms Edna's theory that Harry is secretly depressed. Edna resolves that information is the sign that she must now find a way to meet Harry in person and save him ("Set You Free").

The very next morning, True Connection announce new tour dates, including a stop in Edna's home town ("The Announcement"). Across Australia, fans express their outrage at the ticket prices of the concerts. Meanwhile, Edna begs her mother to buy a ticket for her, while Caroline explains they cannot afford it. At school, Brianna tells Jules that her parents have also refused to buy her a ticket, meaning Jules will be going alone with her mum. The girls despair, and Jules pushes Edna to come up with a way for them all to go. Desperate, Edna pressures Jules to blackmail her rich mother into purchasing tickets for all three of them, and weaponises something Jules confessed to her and Brianna previously; that Jules' mother is trying to buy her love during her parents' acrimonious divorce. Jules phones her mum and threatens to expose her mother's previously secret affair unless she gives in. With assurances of tickets coming, the girls are elated ("Actually Dead").

Assured that she has a ticket to the concert, Edna realises this is her destined chance to meet Harry, if only she can find a way to be alone with him at the concert. She contacts Saltypringl and asks them for help with "a story" in which a fan meets Harry at a True Connection concert. She explains she has figured out how her character will get to the concert, but is not sure how she could get Harry alone. Salty proposes an extreme plan, which Edna considers, but while ultimately dismissing it, is struck by new inspiration. In a fantasy, she imagines meeting Harry at the concert. She realises that she could pass him a note on stage that gives him instructions for how to meet her and run away together. Secretly, Edna resolves to carry out this story in real life ("Got No Chill").

Edna arrives at school to discover that Jules has betrayed her and has only purchased one extra concert ticket; for Brianna. Knowing the concert is sold out and that scalped tickets are now going for a thousand dollars each, Edna is left with no way to see Harry. Betrayed, Edna runs off, ending her friendship with Jules and Brianna. Months pass, and Edna spirals into despair while Jules cruelly talks about the upcoming concert. Caroline grows concerned about Edna's obvious depression, and begs her to open up. Edna lashes out at Caroline, questioning why she even became a mother in the first place if she "couldn't afford it". Hurt, but concerned about her daughter, Caroline explains to Edna that she had her because she loves her, but leaves the room, devastated. Left alone, Edna appears with a coil of rope and unlabelled household chemicals in hand ("Don't Exist")

On the night of concert, Jules and Brianna get ready at Jules' house; Brianna is hopeful that the photos she takes that night will transform her image and people will finally think she's hot. Jules hopes that she will somehow find a boyfriend in the crowd. Brianna confesses some guilt that they aren't including Edna, but Jules explains that they needed to ditch Edna because her immaturity was "holding them back". Meanwhile, at home, Edna holds her coil of rope and focuses on how "sorry" everyone is about to be ("Night of our Lives").

Jules and Brianna leave the stadium post concert, overwhelmed and sobbing with joy. At the same time, in Edna's bedroom, we learn why she's collected the rope and chemicals: in her room she has a blindfolded, bound, and gagged Harry ("The Reveal").

=== Act II ===
Act two opens with a vibrant, bopping set of songs which the audience can scream and shout to, including front-row fans Yael, Georgia, and Siobhan, who throw roses at Harry and yell at other fans who try to get his attention ( "Concert Medley" and "Nobody (Acoustic)").

We jump back in time to see Edna remove Harry's gag for the first time, but is overwhelmed by the sight of him in person, and while she is lost for words he cries out for help, so she is forced to chloroform him again to avoid discovery. Across the globe, Harry's fans react to news of his disappearance; vigils are held around the world. Meanwhile, Edna convinces Caroline that she is too sick to go to school and must stay home alone while she works. When Jules reads the news, she is confronted with her own mortality, and doubles down on her quest for a boyfriend. Brianna is moved by the solidarity of the fans and thinks about attending her local vigil ("Panic").

In Edna's room, Harry asks Edna to explain why she kidnapped him. She presents a rehearsed pitch (with notecards) explaining that there was no other way that his management would allow him to leave the band and have his own life, so therefore she is his only way out. She proposes that they run away together, and presents the extensive supplies she has stockpiled for this mission; including rolls of cash, fake IDs, various disguises and a fake baby to help convince people they are a couple. Harry convinces Edna he will run away with her, but as soon as she unties him, pushes her to the ground and makes a run for it. She takes off after him ("Become Brand New").

Around the world, fans grow more and more worried about Harry and are beginning to start doing very strange things to show their support for him. Salty contacts Edna, and asks for help getting the hashtag #cutforharry banned on Twitter, to prevent self-harm among fans. At work, Caroline grows concerned for Edna when she sees a news story about grieving fans ("Life or Death"). At her home, Jules answers a disappointing call from her dad, revealing that in their divorce, she is being left neglected by both parents. In her room, Brianna tries to recreate photos from the night of the concert, after discovering that Jules has thoughtlessly deleted all photos of her from the night to save space on her phone. Edna re-enters her room with Harry, who is now tied to a wheelie chair with an assortment of household cables. In a fight between them, it becomes clear there is no way she will ever convince him to listen to her, let alone run away with her. Harry implores her to call the police, and tells her that she should be disgusted with herself. Between their bedrooms, all three girls reflect on their various fears that they are undesirable and disgusting ("Disgusting").

Edna reaches out to Salty asking for help coming up with a new ending for their kidnapping story. Edna wants an ending in which "their protagonist" realises that Harry will never run away with her, and finds a way to successfully reverse her actions so she never gets found out. Salty declares the only realistic way out is if the fan kills Harry, and it will make for great drama in the story.

Caroline returns home early, and Edna chloroforms Harry yet again to conceal him in her wardrobe. Caroline tells Edna that she's aware of the impact of Harry's disappearance, and tries to comfort Edna by letting her know that police have found security footage of someone putting a heavy suitcase into an unmarked van outside the venue on the night of the concert. Edna implores Caroline to let her go to sleep; Caroline laments that she always hopes Edna will come to her with her problems ("Brave Thing").

Brianna goes to meet Jules at a vigil, but Jules is nowhere to be found. At the vigil, fans share their grief, which quickly turns to rage when they see how their feelings are being mocked by the media and society writ large ("Justice"). Energised and freshly radicalised with a new understanding of feminism from the vigil, Brianna shows up at Jules' house, demanding to know why she abandoned her, to which Jules explains she met a boy on the bus and they are now boyfriend and girlfriend. Moving past this, Brianna insists that Jules recognise how badly they have treated Edna and that she apologise, because she worried about the fact they haven't seen or heard from Edna in three days.

Realising that she cannot bring herself to kill Harry, Edna decides to surrender herself to the police. Before phoning them, she is struck with the revelation that when she does this, she will be seen for the rest of her life as "a silly little girl", and no one will stop to try and understand of the forces and expectations which surround girls and shape their options ("Silly Little Girl").

Just as she begins the call Brianna and Jules barge into her room unannounced, where, while Jules tries to apologise for her behaviour, they notice a male voice yelling for help from Edna's wardrobe. Jules opens the wardrobe and discovers Harry. Brianna wants to immediately call the police, but Jules forbids it and begins aggressively flirting with Harry while perching on his bound-to-a-chair lap. She tries to take off his gag, but he bites her as soon as his mouth is free. Jules yells in pain, and when he won't let go, Brianna panics and hits him over the head with Edna's laptop, which knocks him out cold. The girls, in a panic, discuss what to do next. Jules suggests killing him, but Brianna proposes they should just drug him and dump him in "the woods", to which Edna offers to drive them in her stolen van. While they spin themselves into a panic, Caroline walks into the room and discovers the missing global pop star in her daughter's bedroom. She tells Edna "you won't be driving anywhere… I'll drive" ("The Woods").

Jumping forward in time, the global fans reflect on their lives since Harry's disappearance and miraculous reappearance. They bond over their shared disbelief in his story that he was kidnapped by a fourteen year old fan and agree it must be fake because of how implausible it is. They reveal that Harry left the band shortly after he returned to the stage and realise that it was not him that they loved, but the feeling of loving something without apology, and being in a community of people who all loved that much and supported each other ("Nobody (Reprise)").

Edna, Jules, and Brianna review their shared experiences, strengthened friendships, and personal development since first meeting. Brianna maintains ongoing concern regarding potential law enforcement tracking ("Maybe We're More").

== Musical Numbers ==
Act I

- "Let Them" – Edna, Harry
- "Nobody" – Lily, Saltypringl, Ash, Dom, Greta, Edna, and Harry †
- "Wait and See" – Edna ††
- "Feels So True" – Saltypringl, Edna, Lily and Fan Fiction Authors †
- "Set You Free" – Edna
- "The Announcement" – Harry, Edna, and Fans
- "Actually Dead" – Edna, Caroline, Riwa, Rosa, Jules, Brianna, and Students
- "Got No Chill" – Edna, Saltypringl, Harry, and Ensemble
- "Don’t Exist" – Video Fan Chorus, Lily, Saltypringl, Ash, Caroline and Edna
- "Night of Our Lives" – Jules, Brianna, Edna, Caroline, and Company †
- "The Reveal" – Harry, Jules, Brianna, Edna

Act II

- "Concert Medley" – True Connection (Harry, Myles, Rees, Zak, Leo)
- "Nobody (Acoustic)" – Harry
- "Panic" – Lily, Saltypringl, Ash, Dom, Greta
- "Become Brand New" – Edna, Harry
- "Life or Death (Actually Dead Reprise)" – Fans
- "Disgusting" – Jules, Edna and Brianna
- "Brave Thing" - Caroline
- "Justice" – Cam, Rosa, Tal, Naz, and Brianna ††
- "Silly Little Girl" – Edna
- "The Woods" – Jules, Edna, Brianna
- "Nobody (Reprise)" – Lily, Saltypringl, Ash, Dom, Greta
- "Maybe We’re More” – Edna, Brianna, Jules, Saltypringl, Caroline, Harry and Lily

† Released before the entire album as a single.
†† Released early as a special access song.

== Recordings ==
The world premiere cast recording of Fangirls was released by Ghostlight Records on 30 April 2021. The album is the first Australian musical to be released by Ghostlight Records. It was nominated for an ARIA Award for Best Original Soundtrack or Musical Theatre Cast Album in October 2021.

== Productions ==
=== First Australian Tour (2019) ===
Fangirls premiered at the Bille Brown Theatre, Brisbane for Queensland Theatre from 7 September to 5 October 2019, and was performed in Sydney at the Belvoir St Theatre from 12 October to 10 November 2019.

The original production was directed by Paige Rattray, with a cast including Yve Blake, Aydan Calafiore, Kimberley Hodgson, Chika Ikogwe, Ayesha Madon, James Majoos, Sharon Millerchip and Melissa Russo.

=== Sydney and Second Australian Tour (2021) ===
Fangirls returned to Sydney in 2021 at the Seymour Centre featuring Karis Oka as Edna, Shubshri Kandiah as Brianna, Tomáš Kantor and Shannen Alyce Quan as swings, and Aydan Calafiore, Chika Ikogwe, Ayesha Madon and James Majoos reprising their roles from 2019. A national tour to Adelaide, Wollongong, Canberra and Melbourne followed. Danielle Barnes took over the role of Caroline when the Adelaide leg of the tour started. The tour played its final show on May 9, 2021.

A cast recording featuring the 2019 cast was released on April 30, 2021, through Ghostlight Records.

=== London (2024) ===
In July 2024, the Lyric Theatre, Hammersmith co-produced a new production with Sonia Friedman, again directed by Paige Rattray. This new production follows the same story with some new additions, such as a newly written solo song Learning to be Lonely sung by Edna toward the beginning of Act 1.

== Principal cast ==
Role	First Australian tour	Sydney	Second Australian tour	Sydney	London
Role	2019	2021	2021	2022	2024
Edna	Yve Blake	Karis Oka	Karis Oka	Manali Datar	Jasmine Elcock
Harry	Aydan Calafiore	Aydan Calafiore	Aydan Calafiore	Blake Appelqvist	Thomas Grant
Caroline & Others	Sharon Millerchip	Sharon Millerchip	Danielle Barnes (Note: Barnes was originally meant to star in the 2021 Sydney production, however due to an injury Millerchip reprised her role for the Sydney leg of the tour.)	Danielle Barnes	Debbie Kurup
Jules & Others	Chika Ikogwe	Chika Ikogwe	Chika Ikogwe	Milo Hartill	Mary Malone
Brianna & Others	Kimberley Hodgson (Note: Hodgson also covered the role of Edna.)	Shubshri Kandiah	Shubshri Kandiah	Tonieka Del Rosario	Miracle Chance
Lily & Others	Ayesha Madon	Ayesha Madon	Ayesha Madon	Mel O'Brian	Gracie McGonigal
Saltypringl & Others	James Majoos (Note: In the 2019 Tour, Majoos was the understudy for Harry.)	James Majoos	James Majoos	Jesse Dutlow	Terique Jarrett
Swing(s)	Melissa Russo (Caroline, Jules, Brianna, Lily, Saltypringl)	Tomáš Kantor (Harry, Lily, Saltypringl) and Shannen Alyce Quan (Edna, Caroline, Jules, Brianna) (Note: While Melissa Russo was an offstage swing, Tomáš Kantor, Shannen Alyce Quan, and all subsequent swings were onstage swings and played various ensemble roles.)		Tomáš Kantor (Harry, Lily, Saltypringl) and Hannah McInerney (Edna, Caroline, Jules, Brianna)	

== Reception ==
The musical was highly acclaimed, described by Limelight as "a brilliant, sparkling new Australian musical about young women coming into their power that will have you swapping stories of first concerts and first crushes, and humming the tunes all the way home". The Sydney Morning Herald described the show as "loud and funny and raw, with a powerful message delivered with sass and joy".

Fangirls was awarded Best Production of a Mainstage Musical at the Sydney Theatre Awards in January 2020, and was nominated for Best Original Score of a Mainstage Production. It was named Best Musical or Cabaret at the Queensland Matilda Awards in February 2020, as well as nominations for Best Mainstage Production and three other categories.

For the book and lyrics, Blake received the 2020 AWGIE Award for Music Theatre.

Fangirls received a Melbourne Green Room Award for New Australian Writing for Music Theatre in July 2022. In the Green Room Awards' Music Theatre category it was also nominated for Production of the Year, Stage Direction, Music Direction, Design (Davis Fleischer, costume), Leading Artists (Karis Oka) and two for Supporting Artists (Danielle Barnes and Chika Ikogwe).

== Awards and nominations ==
Australian Production
Year	Award Ceremony	Category	Nominee	Result
2019	Sydney Theatre Awards	Best Production of a Mainstage Musical	Fangirls	Won
2019	Sydney Theatre Awards	Best Original Score of a Mainstage Production	Yve Blake with Alice Chance and David Muratore	Nominated
2019	Sydney Theatre Awards	Best Newcomer	Chika Ikogwe (The Wolves/Fangirls)	Won
2019	Sydney Theatre Awards	Best Choreography in a Musical	Leonard Mickelo	Nominated
2019	Matilda Awards	Best Musical or Cabaret	Fangirls	Won
2019	Matilda Awards	Best Mainstage Production	Fangirls	Shortlisted
2019	Matilda Awards	Best Video Design	Justin Harrison	Shortlisted
2019	Matilda Awards	Best Director	Paige Rattray	Shortlisted
2019	Matilda Awards	Best Female Actor in a Supporting Role	Kimberly Hodgson	Shortlisted
2020	AWGIE Awards	Music Theatre	Yve Blake	Won
2021	ARIA Music Award	ARIA Award for Best Original Soundtrack, Cast or Show Album	Fangirls	Nominated
2022	Green Room Awards	New Australian Writing for Musical Theatre	Fangirls	Won
2022	Green Room Awards	Production of the Year	Fangirls	Nominated
2022	Green Room Awards	Best Stage Direction	Paige Rattray	Nominated
2022	Green Room Awards	Best Music Direction	Zara Stanton	Nominated
2022	Green Room Awards	Best Costume Design	Davis Fleischer	Nominated
2022	Green Room Awards	Best Leading Artist	Karis Oka	Nominated
2022	Green Room Awards	Best Supporting Artist	Danielle Barnes	Nominated
2022	Green Room Awards	Best Supporting Artist	Chika Ikogwe	Nominated
