= The Fool (1913 film) =

1913 film

- Directed by: George Pearson
- Written by: George Pearson
- Starring: Godfrey Tearle; Mary Malone; James Carew
- Production company: Big Ben Films-Union
- Distributed by: Pathé Pictures International
- Release date: May 1913
- Country: United Kingdom
- Languages: Silent; English intertitles

The Fool is a 1913 British silent drama film directed by George Pearson and starring Godfrey Tearle, Mary Malone and James Carew. It was based on a poem by Rudyard Kipling.

== Cast ==
- Godfrey Tearle as Sterndale
- Mary Malone as Mrs. Brockwood
- James Carew as Arthur Warde
- Rex Davis

== Bibliography ==
- Goble, Alan. The Complete Index to Literary Sources in Film. Walter de Gruyter, 1999.
