= Rembrandt's Wife =

2009 opera composed by Andrew Ford

Rembrandt's Wife is a chamber opera composed by Andrew Ford with libretto by Sue Smith.

It explores the relationships of Dutch artist Rembrandt with three women: the death of his wife Saskia, the madness of his former lover Geertje Dircx and his muse to be, Hendrickje Stoffels. Smith was inspired to write the opera when, at an exhibition of the artist's etchings, she learned that he sold the burial plot and headstone of his wife.

Victorian Opera premiered the work at the CUB Malthouse, Melbourne in April 2009, roles were played by: Gary Rowley (Rembrandt van Rijn), Jacqueline Porter (Saskia van Uylenburgh/Hendrickje Stoffels), Roxane Hislop (Geertje Dircx), Paul Biencourt (Govert Flinck/Torquiunius/Judge etc.), Talya Masel (director), Adam Gardnir (designer) Merlyn Theatre, CUB Malthouse, Melbourne, 18 April 2009 conducted by Richard Gill.

For Rembrandt's Wife, Ford and Smith received a Melbourne Green Room Award for New Australian Opera. Smith's libretto received the AWGIE Award for Music Theatre in 2010. For his performance Paul Biencourt received Helpmann and Green Room Award nominations.
