= The Neilson Nutshell =

- Interactive map of The Neilson Nutshell
- Address: Pier 2/3, Walsh Bay Arts Precinct, 13A Hickson Rd, Dawes Point; Sydney; Australia
- Coordinates: 33.855°S 151.207°E
- Owner: Bell Shakespeare
- Capacity: Cocktail 300; Sit-down 250; Theatre 295
- Type: Performing Arts and Events Venue

Construction
- Built: 1912-1921
- Opened: 2022
- Architect: H. D. Walsh

Website
- www.bellshakespeare.com.au/the-neilson-nutshell

The Neilson Nutshell is a venue within heritage-listed Walsh Bay Arts Precinct that is owned by Bell Shakespeare. It is Bell Shakespeare’s main studio and theatre space for both rehearsal and productions, and can be transformed into an event space for private or corporate functions.

It is named after a quote from Shakespeare’s play Hamlet where the title character states “O God, I could be bounded in a nutshell, and count myself a king of infinite space.”

== Productions ==
Notable productions include

- Mackenzie (2026)
- Coriolanus (2025)
- King Lear (2024)
- Romeo and Juliet (2023)
- In A Nutshell (2022)
