= Tertangala =

Student magazine of the University of Wollongong

The Tert

- Cover of Issue 2, 2025
- Type: Quarterly student magazine
- School: University of Wollongong
- Publisher: Wollongong Undergraduate Students' Association
- Editor-in-chief: Serena Emanuele
- Price: Free
- Founded: September 1962; 63 years ago
- Language: English
- Country: Australia
- Website: thetert.com
- Free online archives: archivesonline.uow.edu.au

The Tert (formerly Tertangala) is the student magazine of the University of Wollongong. First established as a newspaper in September 1962, the publication is older than the institution itself, which was separated from the University of New South Wales in 1975. In 2010, The Tert transitioned to a magazine. It is managed by an elected representative of the Wollongong Undergraduate Students' Association.

== Content ==
Written and edited by student volunteers, the magazine features local news, artwork, poetry, opinion pieces, film and music criticism, and interviews. Occasionally issues are structured around a theme to spark inspiration for writers. The magazine also contains updates from elected representatives of the Wollongong Undergraduate Students' Association (WUSA).

Prior to 1967, The Tert was apolitical, but soon began commenting on local student Labor and Liberal clubs, and the push to solidify the University of Wollongong (UOW) as an independent institution. It also wrote scathingly about the Vietnam War and conscription.

== History ==
The Tert was first published as Tertangala in September 1962, when the school was still an external campus of the University of New South Wales (UNSW), making the paper older than UOW itself, which was established in 1975. The newspaper's first issue was a four-page publication welcoming new students to Open Day, featuring satirical and journalistic articles, plus advertisements for local businesses.

The Tert has a radical editorial tradition, and many of its former editors have transitioned into active political and artistic life. Past editors and staff members have also gone on to write for other publications, such as The New York Times, The Guardian, Rolling Stone Australia, The Australian and Vogue.

All copies of The Tert from 1962 to 2010 are archived by the University of Wollongong library, and are available online. The Tert was originally printed by the Illawarra Mercury, South Coast Times or the Students' Union.

== Name ==
The name Tertangala was thought to mean "smoke signals" in the local Dharawal language, a tribute to Wollongong's industrial history. The name originated when the university was a campus of UNSW, and was chosen to correspond with its sister paper Tharunka (later Gamamari) whose name was thought to mean "message stick". In 2000, then-editor James Breach confirmed the name Tertangala was completely made up, not having roots in any Aboriginal language, and not being used in consultation with the local Aboriginal community.

For decades the names Tertangala and The Tert have been used interchangeably, at the discretion of the editor-in-chief. In 2025, the original name was officially dropped.

== Management ==
The Tert is managed by the Tert coordinator, a position within WUSA elected by Wollongong students. They act as the editor-in-chief and represent the interests of the newspaper at council meetings.

Throughout its history, The Tert was funded by WUSA through membership fees collected from students. The introduction of voluntary student unionism significantly reduced the capacity of WUSA to continue to fund the publication. Following a long campaign in 2007 by the students involved, the University of Wollongong guaranteed $24,000 funding a year until 2010 in an effort to support the publication.

== Recognition ==
Throughout the years, The Tert has won multiple awards, including a merit award for cover design and an investigative journalism award for a feature article about the re-opening of a copper smelter in Port Kembla. The Tert was also named one of the top five student publications in the country.

== Controversies ==
=== WUSA conflicts ===
The WUSA constitution includes a provision designed to check the Tert coordinator's editorial power, by allowing the president veto over any publishable content. This level of editorial control has caused controversy through the paper's history.

In 2004, The Tert was blocked from reporting on the WUSA leadership of then-president Michael Szafraniec, which was referred to as the "Micktatorship" by students. Szafraniec "extensively vetted the newspaper's content" and removed allegations against his name, which included embezzlement, verbal abuse and non-payment of wages.

Robert Bruce Keanan Brown, the paper's editor from 1988 to 1990, resigned in an open letter citing the "bureaucratisation" of the magazine as his main reason for leaving. He stated that:

"Tertangala is the property of the Students, NOT of the SRC... it cannot be made to serve the purposes of the political junketeers that infest the SRC."

=== Inappropriate content ===
The Tert has been accused of being depraved, pornographic, obscene and offensive by residents and local media on more than one occasion. The first was following a Commem Week edition of the publication called Daily Moron in 1974. Locals took issue with the magazine's liberal use of the word "fuck".

During 2009, the WUSA Queer Collective produced the "Sexuality and Gender" issue of The Tert, without the consent of the magazine staff. The edition received some student criticism relating to "offensive" material. The Queer Collective confirmed that the publication was intentionally offensive, consistent with a long tradition of subversive student journalism at UOW.

In 2019 the magazine was accused by UOW that their "Debauchery Edition" was incompatible with the university's Safe and Respectful Communities policy. The then-coordinator of the magazine issued a statement instead pointing the finger at the administration which had refused to introduce compulsory consent courses and to combat sexual assault off-campus.

== Contributors ==
=== Notable alumni ===
Dr. Karl used to write for The Tert while studying at the University of Wollongong in the 1960s, and he ran for the position of editor in 1966 but was unsuccessful.

Van Badham edited the magazine in 1997. Van is now an award-winning Australian playwright.

=== Editors ===
- 1980 – Jay Caselberg, James Hartley
- 1993 – Kathryn Goldie
- 1995 – Damien Cahill
- 1997 – Van Badham
- 1998 – Stuart Hatter
- 2000 – James Beach
- 2013 – Andre Charadia, Chloe Higgins
- 2016 – Claudia Poposki, Jake Cupitt
- 2017 – Aisha Sini, Kurtis Hughes
- 2018 – Laura Thomas, Jarrett Wall
- 2019 – Co-ordinator: Alec Hall; Magazine Editor: Emily Jenkins; Digital Editor: Sarah Gore
- 2020 – Co-ordinator: Kal Slater; Magazine Editor: Caleb Connolly; Digital Editor: Grace Crivellaro
- 2021 – Co-ordinator: Eliza Lourenco; Magazine Editor: Lia Stamatopoulos
- 2022 – Co-ordinator: River McCrossen
- 2023 – Co-ordinator: Alec Hall; Magazine Editor: River McCrossen
- 2024 – Co-ordinator: Will Olteanu
- 2025 – Co-ordinator: Serena Emanuele; Editor in Chief: Emma Cranby; Head of Graphics: Jade Grimson and Hannah Harper; Head of Socials: Molly Duggan
- 2026 – Co-ordinator: Serena Emanuele; Newspaper Editor: Aleksandar Sekulovski; Magazine Editor: Asher Wood; Head of Graphics: Jade Grimson

== See also ==
- University of Wollongong
- Wollongong Undergraduate Students' Association
- List of student publications in Australia
