= Christine McLoughlin =

Australian business leader

Christine McLoughlin AM
- Born: 1964 or 1965 (age 61–62)
- Education: Australian National University

Christine Frances McLoughlin AM (born 1964 or 1965) is an Australian business executive, who is Chairman of the Suncorp Group Ltd and Chair of Aware Super, a director for global medical devices company Cochlear Limited, and Chairman and Co-Founder of the Minerva network. She is a former Chancellor of the University of Wollongong.

== Career ==
McLoughlin graduated from the Australian National University with a BA (1984) and LLB (1986). Her honours thesis was titled "Recent developments in corporate financing: Redeemable preference shares and convertible notes".

On graduation, McLoughlin began her career working for the law firm Allen Allen and Hemsley from 1987 to 1992, moving to Optus Communications in 1993 as their corporate counsel. From there she became general manager of the Office of the CEO at AMP Limited from 1997 to 2004. She then joined Insurance Australia and later Westpac, in their insurance arm.

McLoughlin joined the board of Suncorp Group in 2015 and has been chairman of Suncorp Group since 2018; she was appointed Chairman of Aware Super in August 2024. McLoughlin was a member of the board of Australian Nuclear Science and Technology Organisation from 2009 to 2013. McLoughlin is one of the co-founders and chairman of the Minerva Network, a not-for-profit enterprise that provides business mentoring, development programs, networking opportunities and scholarships for female athletes. She was Chairman and Director Venues NSW and Chairman of Destination NSW. Other board directorships include nib Group, the McGrath Foundation, Whitehaven Coal Limited, Spark Infrastructure and The Smith Family.

McLoughlin was appointed the fourth Chancellor of the University of Wollongong, taking over the role from Jillian Broadbent AC in 2020 and completed her term in 2024, handing over to Michael Still.

McLoughlin was appointed a Member of the Order of Australia in the 2021 Queen's Birthday Honours for her "significant service to business, to the not-for-profit sector, and to women".

Academic offices
Preceded by Jillian Broadbent	Chancellor of the University of Wollongong; 2020–2024	Succeeded by Michael Still
