= AWGIE Awards =

Australian screen, stage, and radio writing awards

- Awarded for: Excellence in stage, television, radio, and filmwriting
- Country: Australia
- Presented by: Australian Writers Guild
- First award: 1968

The AWGIE Awards are annual awards given by the Australian Writers' Guild (AWG), for excellence in screen, television, stage, and radio writing.

== History ==
The AWGIE awards were conceived in 1967, with the first event being held in 1968. Bettina Gorton the wife of prime minister John Gorton was guest of honour at the event held at the Wentworth Hotel in Sydney on 22 March 1968, Also in attendance was Sir Robert Madgwick, chairman of the ABC. There were 250 guests in attendance, only 35 of whom were AWG members.

The AWGIEs awards ceremony has become a prominent industry event, and has featured many well-known guests of honour and speakers in the past, including: Manning Clark; Ken Hall; Fred Schepisi; Tom Keneally; Gough Whitlam; Paul Keating; and Roy and HG.

It was held in Melbourne for some years,

The 56th Annual AWGIE Awards event was held on 15 February 2024 at the National Institute of Dramatic Arts in Sydney. In most categories, the awards are given for works for which principal photography, production, or recording was completed in the 2022 calendar year. Stage productions must have had their first professional production in this year, while interactive media or gaming must have been commercially released in this year.

== Description ==
The awards are given annually at an awards event by the AWG for excellence in screen, television, stage, and radio writing.

== Categories ==
There is a large number of categories, as well as some special awards and industry fellowships. The awards are given specifically for the writing of the scripts and not the finished product.

The Major AWGIE Award is awarded to the outstanding script of that year across all categories.

As of 2024 (56th Annual AWGIE Awards), the award categories are:

- Feature film
  - Original
  - Adaptation
- Short Film
- Documentary
  - Public Broadcast (including VOD) or Exhibition
  - Community, Educational and Training
- Television Drama (Includes VOD)
  - Serial
  - Series
  - Limited Series or Telemovie
- Children's Television
  - Pre-school (under 5 years)
  - Children's (5–14 years)
- Comedy (any medium)
  - Situation or Narrative
  - Sketch or Light Entertainment
- Audio ("All scripted radio and podcast works...")
  - Fiction
  - Non-Fiction
- Theatre
  - Stage – Original
  - Stage – Adapted
  - Community and Youth Theatre
  - Theatre for Young Audiences
  - Music Theatre
- Interactive Media & Gaming
- Animation
- Web series

== Named awards and fellowships ==
=== Current ===
==== David Williamson Prize ====
The David Williamson Prize for Excellence in Writing for Australian Theatre, named after playwright David Williamson, was established in 2013. The annual prize is sponsored by David and Kristin Williamson, and Shane and Cathryn Brennan, and awarded "to the most outstanding script selected from the winners of each of the theatre categories at the AWGIE Awards". The purpose of the fund is "to encourage theatre companies to commission, develop and program a new Australian work". From 2017, the value of the prize was increased to A$100,000, with $20,000 awarded to the playwright, and $80,000 to the theatre company that commissioned and staged the prizewinning play, "when they commission and program a new work by an Australian playwright within the following 12 months".

Winners include:

- Alana Valentine for Grounded (2013)
- Andrew Bovell for The Secret River (2014)
- Finegan Kruckemeyer for The Boy at the Edge of Everything (2015)
- Angus Cerini for The Bleeding Tree (2016)
- Leah Purcell for The Drover's Wife (2017)
- P.J. Hogan with Kate Miller-Heidke and Keir Nuttall for Muriel's Wedding the Musical (2018)
- Kate Mulvany for her stage adaptation of the Ruth Park novel The Harp in the South (2019)
- Suzie Miller for Prima Facie (2020)
- Ellen Graham and Jamie Hornsby for Claire Della the Moon (2021)
- Maxine Mellor, for Horizon, with $80 000 going to Playlab Theatre in Brisbane

==== Other named awards ====
As of 2023:

- Dorothy Crawford Award – for Outstanding Contribution to the Profession and the Industry (1984–) (after Dorothy Crawford)
- Hector Crawford Award – for Outstanding Contribution to the Craft as a Script Producer, Editor or Dramaturg (1991-) (after Hector Crawford; not awarded every year)
- Fred Parsons Award – for Outstanding Contribution to Australian Comedy(1988-) (Note: Fred Parsons (1908-1987) was an English-born script writer, stage director, and author; for some years writer for Frank Neil's Tivoli Circuit Australia; friend of Graham Kennedy; subject of an episode of This Is Your Life)
- Australian Writers' Guild Life Membership

=== Past ===
- Richard Lane Award (1988–2019), for an outstanding contribution to the AWG (after Richard Lane (1918–2008), who received the inaugural award)
- Kit Denton Fellowship – For Courage and Excellence in Performance Writing (2007–2012)
- Ian Reed Award for Best Script by a First-Time Radio Writer (1998 and 2000 only)
- Foxtel Fellowship - In Recognition of a Significant and Impressive Body of Work (2007–2013; recipients included Mac Gudgeon, Susan Smith, Kristen Dunphy, Jacquelin Perske); Foxtel Fellowship - In Recognition of an Outstanding and Significant Body of Work in Television (2014, final one)
- Richard Wherrett Prize – Recognising Excellence in Australian Playwriting (selected from the winners from all theatre categories, 2007 & 2009 only)
- CAL Peer Recognition Prize, awarded to the winner of the Major AWGIE Award (2008–2010 only)
- Lifetime Achievement Award (2015: Laura Jones; 2016: Craig Pearce; 2017: Andrew Knight; 2018: Sue Smith)
- Australian Writers Foundation Playwrights Fellowship (2014: Katherine Thomson and Sue Smith)

== Notable winners ==
- Geoffrey Atherden - Member of the Order Of Australia (Jan 2009)
- Cliff Green - Medal of the Order of Australia (June 2009)
- Richard Lane, who won four AWGIEs
- John Misto who won three AWGIEs
- Nick Pearce - The Forgotten City - First video game mod to have received a screenwriters award
