= Tener Brown =

American actress (born 1960)

- Born: 1960 (age 65–66); Upper Montclair, New Jersey, U.S.
- Occupation: Actress

Tener Brown (or Carolyn Tener Brown, born 1960) is an American ballet coach of New Jersey Ballet. She is a former ballet dancer of American Ballet Theatre and actress.

== Personal life and career ==
Brown, from Upper Montclair, New Jersey, started her dance career by training with New Jersey School of Ballet at the age of 7. In 1971, when George Tomal and Joseph Carow choreographed the first New Jersey Ballet's Nutcracker, they added fouettés and challenging pointework for Clara to match Brown's skills. Brown performed as Clara on the opening night at Paper Mill Playhouse with other stars such as Edward Villella in the role of Cavalier. In 1973, Edward Villella choreographed Shenandoah Pas de Deux for New Jersey Ballet, he selected Brown to dance with him in that duet. Brown later joined American Ballet Theatre in 1979 performing corps, soloist, and then principal roles.

After seven years with ABT, Brown shifted her career to Broadway musical, film and television. She was best known for the role of Meg Giry in Andrew Lloyd Webber's musical, The Phantom of the Opera.

Currently, Brown is a repertory coach for New Jersey Ballet and a teacher at New Jersey School of Ballet.

== Acting credits ==
During her acting career, Brown's credits include:

- Hair
- All My Children
- The Sopranos
- Carousel
- Brigadoon
- Fame-the musical as Iris Kelly
- La Cage Aux Folles
- The Phantom of the Opera: Ballet Chorus of the Opera-Populaire, and then Meg Giry
- Fletch II
- The Saint
- Loving
- Various PBS programs
