= Meg Giry =

Character from Gaston Leroux's novel The Phantom of the Opera

Meg Giry is one of the fictional characters from Gaston Leroux's 1910 novel The Phantom of the Opera. In the story, she is Madame Giry's daughter.

== Description ==
In the novel she is described as having “eyes black as sloes, hair black as ink, a swarthy complexion and a poor little skin stretched over poor little bones". She is also, in the novel, portrayed as a young girl who adores having her own way and attention. Due to her mother's role as the keeper of Box Five, Meg often learns about the Phantom from her mother and thus occasionally acts as a source of information about the ghost to the other ballet girls. She is described by the author in the prologue as "the most charming star of our admirable corps de ballet", despite her unattractiveness and gossipy, bratty personality. When confronted with the news that Christine was singing in the opening Gala, she tells Count Phillipe de Chagny that it was impossible for her to have a "divine voice" let alone become a success, that "six months ago she sang like a crock/rusty hinge".

Madame Giry is compelled to work for the Phantom because he left her a letter that told her that Meg (should she deserve it) would become Empress. Early in the novel, it is explained in the Prologue that Meg Giry, after the story's events, had indeed become the Baroness de Castelot-Barbezac.

In the Andrew Lloyd Webber adaptation, Meg is a supporting character and the best friend of Christine Daaé. In these adaptations, her personality is much sweeter, caring and somewhat innocent, a talented actress and ballet dancer who shows genuine concern for Christine's claim of an Angel of Music (really the Phantom) coaching her. Meg often is portrayed as having blonde hair and blue eyes.

In Susan Kay's novel Phantom, she is mentioned briefly through Erik’s point of view; as she is telling Christine of the Opera Ghost he listens to her story. While she is friends with Christine as in the musical, she is a gossip as in the book, who almost seems excited to share dreadful stories.

"Never you mind how I know. I just do, that’s all. We know a lot about the Opera Ghost, Ma and I, but it isn’t safe to talk about it here. And you’d better believe me for your own good- he doesn’t like people who don’t know how to show a proper respect, and when he’s angry terrible things happen."

"What sort of things?" I heard real alarm enter the other voice now.

"Awful things!" said Meg cheerfully, "truly awful. The floor in our dressing room starts to run with blood..."

Up in box five I blinked in surprised amusement. That was a new one! Little Giry should be writing Gothic novels, not prancing around the stage dressed as a water nymph!

"...disembodied hands come out of the wall and crawl across the stage," continued Meg with glee, "and people just disappear and are never seen again. Like Joseph Buquet."

== Musical ==
In the musical Meg first appears as the one who suggests to the theatre managers to put Christine in the leading role of the opera Hannibal once leading lady Carlotta Giudicelli is spooked by the Phantom's threats. Her mother, Madame Giry, agrees and supports the decision. Normally she and Christine would be part of the ballet ensemble led by Madame Giry, and Meg remains in the ensemble, supportive of Christine. At the end of Christine's performance, Christine confides in Meg in the musical number "Angel of Music" that she has been coached by a mysterious tutor who is calling her to him. Meg dismisses her claims, but after Christine's disappearance, comes to believe in the Phantom's powers, in part due to her mother's experiences with the Phantom as a young man.

At the end of the musical, Meg finds the Phantom's mask that he had used to cover his disfigured face resting on his chair in his abandoned underground lair, and holds it, being the last character seen on stage.

=== Love Never Dies ===
Meg has a larger role in the sequel musical, Love Never Dies, where she craves the Phantom's recognition of her talent and is in love with him, but he ignores her entirely and continues to obsess over Christine. She now has a difficult relationship with her mother, who forced Meg into prostitution so they could support their establishment; her friendship with Christine has also soured due to her jealousy. After being disregarded by The Phantom and feeling unappreciated by her mother, she kidnaps Christine's child, Gustave, and threatens to kill him. A grieving, suicidal Meg goes on to rant about being used and cast aside. She brings the gun to her head before accidentally shooting Christine instead, and flees the scene.

== Actresses ==
- Carla Laemmle in the 1925 movie The Phantom of the Opera starring Lon Chaney, Norman Kerry and Mary Philbin
- Janet Devenish (opening cast), and Heidi Ann O'Brien in West End production of Andrew Lloyd Webber's 1986 musical
- Elisa Heinsohn (opening cast), Catherine Ulissey, Tener Brown, Geralyn Del Corso, Jennifer Dawn Stillings, Joelle Gates, Heather McFadden, Jessica Bishop, Polly Baird, Kara Klein and Deanna Doyle in Broadway production of Andrew Lloyd Webber's musical. Paloma Garcia-Lee closing National tour Meg
- Brianne Kelly Morgan in the 2006 Andrew Lloyd Webber musical Phantom — The Las Vegas Spectacular
- Sharon Millerchip in the original 1990 Australian cast of The Phantom of the Opera and in the original Australian cast of Love Never Dies
- Jennifer Ellison in the 2004 movie The Phantom of the Opera
- Daisy Maywood in the 25th anniversary of The Phantom of the Opera, The Phantom of the Opera at the Royal Albert Hall
- Morgan Cowling in Cameron Mackintosh's new production of The Phantom of the Opera (2016)
- Hillary Reiter in the 2019 world tour of The Phantom of the Opera
- Summer Strallen in Andrew Lloyd Webber's musical Love Never Dies Original London Cast
- Rachel Tucker for the private workshop of Love Never Dies
- Melo Ludwig in the 2025 North American Tour
- Jayme Jo Massoud in the 2026 Australian Tour
