= Blake Appelqvist =

Australian actor (born ?)

- Born: 16 March
- Education: Victorian College of the Arts (BFA)
- Occupation: Actor
- Years active: 2015–present
- Height: 6 ft 3 in (191 cm)

Blake Appelqvist (born 16 March) is a New Zealand and Swedish actor.

== Early life and education ==
Appelqvist is of Swedish and Māori (Ngāti Porou) heritage. They graduated in 2015 from the Victorian College of the Arts with a Bachelor of Fine Arts (Music Theatre).

== Career ==
Appelqvist portrayed Paul Owen in the first Australian production of American Psycho at the Hayes Theatre in Sydney, from 10 May to 9 June 2019. The following year, they returned to the Hayes Theatre as Tommy Albright in Brigadoon, from 27 April to 1 May, produced by Neglected Musicals, before later playing Oaken in Frozen at the Capitol Theatre.

Appelqvist appeared in If/Then from 22 to 26 November 2023 at the Hayes Theatre as Josh Barton. In July 2025, they appeared as Cayden in the play threadbare at St Martins Youth Arts Centre from 15 to 19 July 2025, written by Tomas Parrish-Chynoweth and directed by Manali Datar.

== Theatre credits ==
Year	Show	Role	Venue
2015	West Side Story	Diesel	State Theatre
2015–16	Ghost	Ensemble/Sam Wheat (understudy)	National tour
2016	Funny Girl	Ziegfeld Tenor	State Theatre
2016–17	Kinky Boots	Angel	National Australian tour
2017–18	Priscilla, Queen of the Desert	Miss Understanding	National Australian tour
2019	Dorian Gray Naked	Dorian Gray	Limelight on Oxford
2019–20	Spamalot	Sir Dennis Galahad	Hayes Theatre/national Australian tour
2019	American Psycho	Paul Owen	Hayes Theatre
2019	The Dismissal	Sir Garfield Barwick/Lance Barnard	Seymour Centre
2019	Kiss of the Spider Woman	Esteban/Ensemble	Southbank Theatre
2020	Frozen	Oaken	Capitol Theatre
2022	Brigadoon	Tommy Albright	Hayes Theatre
2022	Bonnie & Clyde	Clyde Barrow	Hayes Theatre
2022	Fangirls	Harry	Sydney Opera House
2022	The Lovers	Demetrius	The Playhouse, Sydney Opera House
2023	& Juliet	Romeo Montague	Regent Theatre/Capitol Theatre
2023	If/Then	Josh Barton	Hayes Theatre
2025	A Transgender Woman on the Internet, Crying	Corrin Verbeck	Chapel Off Chapel
2025	threadbare	Cayden	St Martins Youth Arts Centre
2026	A Transgender Woman on the Internet, Crying	Corrin Verbeck	Guild Theatre
2026	A Transgender Woman on the Internet, Crying	Corrin Verbeck	Old Fitz Theatre

== Discography ==
=== Cast albums ===
Title	Details	Peak chart positions
Title	Details	AUS
FANGIRLS (World Premiere Cast Recording)	Release date: 29 April 2021; Label: Ghostlight; Formats: CD, streaming	—N/a
A Transgender Woman on the Internet Crying (Songs From the Musical)	Release date: 29 December 2024; Label: Independent; Formats: Streaming	—N/a

== Awards and nominations ==
Year	Association	Category	Nominated work	Result	Reference
2019	Glugs Theatrical Awards	Most Outstanding Performance or Performances by a Newcomer	Dorian Gray Naked	Nominated	
2019	Glugs Theatrical Awards	Most Outstanding Performance or Performances by a Newcomer	Spamalot	Nominated	
2019	Glugs Theatrical Awards	Most Outstanding Performance or Performances by a Newcomer	American Psycho	Nominated	
