= The Questions (musical) =

Australian musical

- Music: Richard Wise
- Lyrics: Richard Wise; Van Badham
- Book: Van Badham
- Premiere: 26 July 2024: Space Theatre, Adelaide Festival Centre, Adelaide
- Productions: 2024 Adelaide

The Questions is a musical with book and lyrics by Van Badham and music and lyrics by Richard Wise. A romantic comedy, it was inspired by a true story from the COVID-19 pandemic.

The Questions premiered at the Space Theatre, Adelaide Festival Centre, for the State Theatre Company South Australia, directed by Mitchell Butel. After previews from 26 July 2024, it opened on 30 July and the season concluded on 17 August.

It was nominated for the 2026 AWGIE Award for Music Theatre.
