= The Prince (play) =

2022 play by Abigail Thorn

- Original language: English
- Written by: Abigail Thorn
- Subject: Transgender identity, unhealthy relationships, William Shakespeare

Premiere
- Date: September 2022
- Place: Southwark Playhouse, London

The Prince is a play by Abigail Thorn in which transgender characters from William Shakespeare's plays realise they are trapped in a performance and try to escape. The play ran at the Southwark Playhouse from 19 September 2022 to 8 October and a filmed version was released to the streaming service Nebula on 16 February 2023.

The play had a majority trans cast and took inspiration from Tom Stoppard's Rosencrantz and Guildenstern Are Dead. Thorn remarked that Shakespeare often cast men curious about gender, which inspired the transgender allegory in the play. The Prince garnered several awards from The Offies and BroadwayWorld as well as mixed reviews from critics, who praised its approach to Shakespeare and its transgender themes but critiqued certain plot elements.

== Plot ==
=== Act 1 ===
Loosely following the plot of Shakespeare's Henry IV, Part 1 and with its dialogue largely in Shakespearean English blank verse, the play begins with the Battle of Holmedon Hill. Hotspur, a hypermasculine knight who does not yet realise that she (Note: Although Hotspur is initially referred to with he/him pronouns by other characters in the play, Thorn refers to the character using she/her pronouns in the script's stage directions.) is transgender, leads the English forces to victory against the Scots. Though Hotspur intends to execute the captured Scottish leader, she lends him to Crown Prince Hal when he agrees to convince his father to ransom her brother-in-law, who had recently been taken prisoner by Welsh rebels.

The supporting characters Sam and Jen suddenly speak in everyday English, revealing that they are 21st-century women, rather than medieval ones, trapped inside a multiverse of Shakespeare's plays. Sam, a care home manager, explains to Jen that she encountered her in Julius Caesar and implies she rescued her because she recognised that they are both trans women. Sam shows Jen a magical map providing directions to an exit that would allow them to escape at the end of Henry IV, Part 1 into the real world. However, the two are separated when Hotspur recruits Jen to look for a lost sword. Jen finds the sword, but when Hotspur shakes her hand in gratitude, the two experience a painful, magical force that propels them into new scenes.

Jen finds herself reunited with Sam, while Hotspur is back at home, having recounted the battle to her wife, Lady Kate. Later, Henry IV refuses to ransom Hotspur's brother-in-law. Prince Hal intimates to Hotspur that the King is angry because of Prince Hal's homosexuality. The Prince, secretly in love with Hotspur, suggests that Hotspur ask the King again to ransom Hotspur's brother-in-law once his mood improves, but Hotspur rebuffs him. Instead, Hotspur, her father, and her uncle agree to defect, joining forces with the Scots and the Welsh in their rebellion against Henry IV.

Though Sam warns her not to, Jen talks to Hotspur and other characters outside of their prescribed blank verse in an attempt to rescue them as Sam had done for her. As a result, the Shakespearean characters slip into modern dialect, question their medieval perspectives, and become more aware of the set and audience. The set begins to malfunction as the plot deviates from Henry IV, Part 1. Seizing the map from Sam, Jen demands to know what happens at the end of Henry IV, Part 1, and the entire play blacks out.

=== Act 2 ===
Jen's interference with the established plot and language of Henry IV, Part 1 has caused such havoc that all characters are now transported into Hamlet. Sam confesses to Jen that she was trapped playing a minor one-line character in Antony and Cleopatra and for a longer time than she had previously disclosed. Jen apologises for interfering, and the two make their way, using the map, back to Henry IV, Part 1. There, Lady Kate brings Hotspur her sword in preparation for the Battle of Shrewsbury. Still confused by the earlier metatheatre, Lady Kate asks what is happening and soon reverts back to modern parlance again, but Hotspur tells her that it was just a dream and that she should return home. When Kate balks at this explanation, now full-blown questioning the rigid medieval expectations of womanhood, Hotspur yells at her that a woman's place is to obey her husband.

After Lady Kate leaves angrily, Hotspur's uncle informs her that King Henry IV and Prince Hal have unexpectedly arrived to fight in person and that her father is sick and cannot join the battle. Though Hotspur's uncle advises against it, Hotspur decides the battle must commence. Sam and Jen traverse through the battle in search of the exit. As Hotspur seeks out Prince Hal to duel him, the exit appears and Jen tries to convince Hotspur to come with them. Sam joyfully runs through the exit, but Hotspur is reluctant to leave, so Jen stays behind for her, promising to help her the next time the play restarts. Hotspur and Prince Hal fight until the mortally wounded Hotspur falls, unable to recite the final lines that Prince Hal expects her to, and dies.

Part 1 reboots, and Hotspur, King Henry IV, and Prince Hal hesitantly play their parts, now slipping in and out of their original lines, until Jen triumphantly re-emerges with the map in hand, greets them, and guides them all to the exit.

In a final scene, Sam and Jen meet up in the real world months or year later. Jen recounts her blissful new life travelling to tropical places internationally, while Sam remains more aloof and tightlipped, initially lying to try to match the excitement of Jen's news. Jen gives Sam the magical map, now lacking its former powers, to keep as a souvenir. Jen invites Sam to join her for lunch, but Sam declines and, hugging Jen, she leaves. A moment later, Hotspur, Hal, and Kate arrive, all in modern clothing, and they embrace Jen gratefully and enthusiastically. Hotspur is in full feminine dress for the first time. Jen tells them glumly that Sam decided not to join them, and they soothe her. Hotspur observes that it can be difficult acclimating to a new role, and Jen laughs that "All the world's a stage".

== Production ==
British YouTuber and actress Abigail Thorn began drafting The Prince as a drama student out of an interest in exploring the character Hotspur and writing scenes in verse. Thorn took inspiration from the play Rosencrantz and Guildenstern Are Dead, which depicts Hamlet from the perspective of two minor characters. Later, after realising she was trans, Thorn redrafted The Prince through a queer lens and worked with dramaturg Donnacadh O'Briain.

Due to a conflict of interest, Thorn did not choose the cast. The majority of the cast were trans, and much of the crew was queer as well. Natasha Rickman served as director and Thorn starred as Hotspur. Martha Godfrey was tasked with lighting and used colorful, fluorescent bars. At the start of the five-week rehearsal process, the cast participated in a trans-awareness training session. In the published script, Thorn prescribes that Hotspur, Jen, and Sam always be played by trans women in any future productions of the play. In a later interview, however, Thorn expressed openness towards productions where Sam and Jen are played by non-binary or transmasculine actors.

Previews of The Prince began on 15 September 2022. The play ran from 19 September to 8 October at Southwark Playhouse, an Off West End venue, where it was performed in the round. During the play's run, Thorn needed a security officer for protection from a stalker. The premier production of The Prince was funded by and filmed for the streaming service Nebula. Notably, the production broke even before opening night by driving subscriptions to Nebula. The filmed version incorporates recordings of two different nights, as well as close-up shots captured without an audience. It was released on Nebula on 16 February 2023 and a remastered version was released later that year.

=== Other productions ===
The play premiered in North America on 31 May 2024. The play ran for three performances, until 1 June, at the Barking Legs Theatre, a small venue in Chattanooga, Tennessee and was produced by the local nonprofit, The Seed Theatre. Trenton Waterson, the vice president of Nebula, visited the show during the sold-out opening night.

In July 2025, the play ran for seven performances at the Lace Market Theatre, Nottingham.

The Canadian premiere of the play ran from January 30-February 15, 2026 in Waterloo, Ontario at the Kitchener-Waterloo Little Theatre, a nonprofit, volunteer-run community theatre. The nine show run played to sold out audiences.

== Themes ==
The Prince has themes of transgender identity, political radicalisation and unhealthy romantic, platonic and familial relationships. Thorn described it as "like The Matrix if it was written in 1600". Thorn said that Shakespeare is fit for trans allegory as his performers were originally all male and his writing was dense with jokes about people dressing up as or being confused about other genders. Thorn's character, Hotspur, is written by Shakespeare as having idealised manhood. Thorn did not see The Prince as a "queer play", but more generally one about "characters who are trapped for all sorts of reasons". She compared it to a period of concealing her gender on Philosophy Tube.

== Critical reception ==
The play received three stars out of five in reviews from The Guardian, The Daily Telegraph, BroadwayWorld, The Stage and The Reviews Hub. A reviewer for The Guardian, Kate Wyver, said that it is an "ambitious if slightly feverish exploration of transgression and transition within Shakespeare's plays" that "playfully questions the performance of gender and the roles we are all assigned". Wyver found that the plot mechanics brought "frustrating confusion", but that the audience would "see these characters anew" through a queer lens, and that "glee oozes from Thorn's playful juggling of Shakespearean language around identity and performance". Claire Allfree of The Daily Telegraph analysed that The Prince fit well with Shakespeare's use of metatheatre and themes of gender and performance, as well as Shakespeare criticism such as the Victorian interpretation of Prince Hamlet as a woman. Allfree compared it to the plays I, Joan (2022) and & Juliet (2019) and reviewed that it was "inclusive and constructive" but had an "untidy energy".

Cindy Marcolina, writing in BroadwayWorld, approved of The Prince's "sacrilegious approach to Shakespeare" in which Thorn explores characters' psychology "with a contemporary lens" but "remaining surprisingly faithful to the original" and re-appraises Shakespeare's language around gender and bravery "under queer lights". However, Marcolina believed that "the scripted ending stands on wobbly feet and the framing never gets the explanation it needs to be satisfyingly convincing". The Prince received a positive review from PinkNews's Asyia Iftikhar, who praised Thorn's interweaving of Shakespeare's work and her own, writing: "Thorn's mastery over rhythm, pacing, mediaeval literature and comedic wordplay shine on the stage".

The Stage's Frey Kwa Hawking praised the multiple trans characters and the ambition of the play, with its "tantalising ideas about the performance of gender and duty". Hawking also praised the "brittle, uneasy energy" that Thorn brought to her character, Hotspur. However, Hawking criticised aspects of the pacing and narrative, such as the "text-heavy" nature, "creaking plot mechanics", length of time spent in Shakespeare's play in the second act. Characterisation was also critiqued by Hawking, including the "under-explored" nature of Kate and Hotspur's marriage and "thinly sketched" relationship between Jen and Sam. Oliver Pattrick of The Reviews Hub similarly praised the transgender themes while criticising the writing, summarising that "it feels like the script needs a further rewrite to realise its full potential". Pattrick suggested that the plot mechanics be made "less prominent", that Hotspur's discovery of her womanhood needed more "depth" and slower pacing, and that the humour was overly reliant on "incongruity of blunt modern slang as a response to elaborate archaic language".

== Awards ==
Year	Award	Category	Nominee	Result
2022	Offie	ONEOFF	Abigail Thorn	Non-competitive
2022	BroadwayWorld UK / West End Awards	Best Leading Performer in a New Production of a Play	Abigail Thorn	Won
2022	BroadwayWorld UK / West End Awards	Best New Production of a Play	The Prince	Won
2022	BroadwayWorld UK / West End Awards	Best Supporting Performer in a New Production of a Play	Mary Malone	Won
2022	BroadwayWorld UK / West End Awards	Best Supporting Performer in a New Production of a Play	Tiana Arnold	Nominated
