= The Lovers (musical) =

2022 musical by Laura Murphy

- Music: Laura Murphy
- Lyrics: Laura Murphy
- Book: Laura Murphy
- Basis: Play A Midsummer Night's Dream by William Shakespeare
- Premiere: 23 October 2022: The Playhouse, Sydney Opera House, Sydney
- Productions: 2022 Sydney; 2025 Brisbane, Sydney

The Lovers is a musical by Australian Laura Murphy, based on William Shakespeare's A Midsummer Night's Dream.

== Premise ==
The Lovers is a pop-infused work that reframes the story with a modern lens, exploring the quest for true love.

== Synopsis ==
=== Act I ===
Oberon welcomes the audience to watch a love story ("A Story About Love"). This is followed by Oberon with ensemble describing love and Puck introducing the characters and band ("Love and Pop and Shakespeare").

Egeus tells her daughter Hermia that she must marry Demetrius. Theseus asks Hermia about Lysander who is her true love. Hermia displays her independence and readiness to make her own decisions but her father Egeus disapproves her love for Lysander ("Perfect Little Princess").

Hermia is left alone upset from her father's decision. Lysander comes along to comfort her suggesting an escape plan. Lysander proposes to Hermia and asks her run away with him. He suggests that they can live at his aunt's house far away from the strict Athenian law ("Start Over").

Helena, Hermia's best friend, complains how Demetrius keeps ignoring her and is always wanting Hermia. Helena has unrequited love for Demetrius who does not reciprocate her feelings as Demetrius is in love with Hermia. Hermia tells her she will soon be out of sight and tells her of her escape plan before running into the forest with Lysander.

Helena reflects on her current loveless life and how her love with Demetrius is not working. However she formulates a plan to meet Demetrius in the forest in attempts to change his mind by telling him of Hermia's escape plan ("Chasing My Tail").

Oberon reminisces a time when love was simple without electronic devices and seeing Helena in love with Demetrius makes Oberon satisfied that simple love still exists ("Down to Love"). Oberon and Puck explain how they are fairies who want to spread love to the world using magic. Oberon requests Puck to find the magic love flower ("The Magic Touch").

In the forest, Helena finds and pursues Demetrius for his love despite his rebuffs and insults ("Helena Follows Her Nose"). Demetrius explains that his personality in wanting hard to get and that Helena is better off alone ("What I Cannot Have"). Despite this Helena knows there’s nothing else to lose and chases after Demetrius ("Chasing My Tail - Reprise").

Oberon asks if Puck has found the magic flower ("Hast Thou the Flower There?"). Oberon reminisces on great happiness of having love and wishes Helena to receive her love from Demetrius ("Euphoria"). Oberon instructs Puck to use the magic flower to appoint an Athenian man's eyes so that the first thing he sees is his love.

Hermia and Lysander are lost in the forest and exhausted find a place to rest. Hermia initially suggests to Lysander that should lie closer to each other to make love until deciding to take it slow and instead sleep further away from each other ("Wrap Around You"). Puck stumbles upon Hermia and Lysander sleeping and mistakenly uses the magic flower on Lysander ("Puck's Spell").

Helena continues to chase Demetrius and Demetrius finally puts his foot down to tell Helena he will never love her. ("What I Cannot Chase"). Helena is left alone and distraught. Lysander wakes up and sees Helena and immediately falls in love with her ("Lysander is in Love"). Helena accuses Lysander of mocking her for lack of love and runs away with him chasing after her.

As Hermia rests, she has a terrible nightmare with snakes telling her that Lysander has abandoned her and that her father was right to not love him ("Hiss Hiss Bitch"). Hermia awakens to find her Lysander missing. All four lovers Hermia, Helena, Lysander and Demetrius will not rest until they find their love ("To Die For") - Hermia searching for Lysander, Lysander trailing Helena from Puck's spell, Helena searching for Demetrius and Demetrius searching Hermia.

=== Act II ===
Oberon and Puck reminisce all the lovers they contributed in forming couples ("Down to Love (Reprise)").

In the forest, Demetrius finds Hermia and Helena cannot shake Lysander. Both Helena and Hermia continually reject their advances for love ("Gimme Gimme (Reprise)"). Oberon discovers Puck put the magic spell on the wrong person Lysander instead of Demetrius and orders her to find Helena ("Thou Hast Mistaken Quite"). Oberon only wants true love ("Euphoria (Reprise)").

Demetrius wanders through the forest and initially has second thoughts in Helena's love but eventually falls asleep ("What I Cannot Have (Reprise)"). Oberon uses the magic flower on sleeping Demetrius ("Oberon's Spell").

Puck leads Helena to Oberon. Helena continually rejects Lysander's love and he states no way Demetrius has this love for her ("Gimme Gimme (Reprise)"). Demetrius wakes up and upon seeing Helena falls in love with her ("Demetrius is in Love").

Demetrius and Lysander quarrel and fight each other for Helena’s love ("Gimme Gimme a Boy Fight"). Hermia finally locates Lysander and discover Lysander no longer loves her ("Injurious Hermia!"). Both Helena and Hermia argue with each other ("Diss Diss Bitch").

Oberon tries to fix this mess but Puck suggests they wash all the magic away and let the lovers figure it out on their own ("King of Shadows"). The four lovers reunite in a dream state reflect that love comes by naturally ("How to Love").

The four lovers wake from their slumber believing it is all just a dream and want to start over by learning from their mistakes ("Start Over (Reprise)").

Oberon and Puck celebrates that all love has mended and the four lovers join in ("Down to Love (Finale)").

== Production ==
The original production was performed from 23 October to 20 November 2022 at the Sydney Opera House, presented by Bell Shakespeare. Directed by Shaun Rennie, the original production featured a live four-piece band. It was the first musical performed by Bell Shakespeare.

A new production, produced by Shake & Stir and Queensland Performing Arts Centre in association with Brisbane Festival, was performed at QPAC's Playhouse from 13 September to 5 October 2025, before transferring to Sydney's Theatre Royal from 31 October 2025 to 16th November 2025. The cast included Natalie Abbott as Helena, Jason Arrow as Demetrius, Jayme-Lee Hanekom as Puck, Loren Hunter as Hermia, Stellar Perry as Oberon, and Mat Verevis as Lysander.

== Reception ==
The musical was generally well received, being described as "a thrilling piece of theatre" and "a great time".

== Awards ==
It was nominated for Best Production of a Musical and Best Performance in a Supporting Role in a Musical (Natalie Abbott) at the 2022 Sydney Theatre Awards.

The 2025 revival was awarded Best Musical or Cabaret at the Queensland Matilda Awards in March 2026.

== Cast recording ==
An album of the musical was released for streaming in July 2024 featuring the full original cast.

== Musical numbers ==
Act I

- "A Story About Love" – Oberon and the Lovers
- "Love and Pop and Shakespeare" – Company and the Fairy Band
- "Happy Be Theseus" – Company †
- "Perfect Little Princess" – Company
- "Overfull of Self Affairs" – Company †
- "Start Over" – Lysander and Hermia
- "Here Comes Helena" – Lysander, Hermia, and Helena †
- "Chasing My Tail" – Helena
- "Down to Love" – Oberon
- "The Magic Touch" – Puck, Oberon, and the Fairy Band
- "I Am Invisible" – Oberon †
- "Helena Follows Her Nose" – Helena and Demetrius
- "What I Cannot Have" – Demetrius, Helena, and the Fairy Band
- "Chasing My Tail (Reprise)" – Helena and Oberon †
- "Hast Thou the Flower There?" – Oberon and Puck
- "Euphoria" – Oberon
- "The Magic Touch (Reprise)" – Oberon and Puck †
- "Wrap Around You" – Hermia, Lysander, and the Fairy Band
- "Puck's Spell" – Puck
- "What I Cannot Chase" – Helena and Demetrius
- "Lysander is in Love" – Lysander
- "Keen Mockery" – Helena and Lysander †
- "Hiss Hiss Bitch" – Snake and Snake Minions
- "Cruel Prey" – Hermia, Snake, and Snake Minions †
- "To Die For" – The Lovers

Act II

- "Down to Love (Reprise)" – Oberon, Puck, and the Fairy Band
- "Gimme Gimme" – The Lovers
- "Thou Hast Mistaken Quite" – Oberon, Puck, Demetrius, and Hermia
- "Euphoria (Reprise)" – Oberon
- "What I Cannot Have (Reprise)" – Demetrius
- "Oberon's Spell" – Oberon
- "Gimme Gimme (Reprise)" – Oberon, Puck, Lysander, and Helena
- "Demetrius is in Love" – Demetrius
- "Gimme Gimme a Boy Fight" – The Lovers
- "Injurious Hermia!" – The Lovers and Snake
- "Diss Diss Bitch" – Company
- "King of Shadows" – Company ‡
- "How to Love" – Company
- "Start Over (Reprise)" – The Lovers
- "Down to Love (Finale)" – Company and the Fairy Band

† Interlude songs; not included on the original cast recording

‡ Added for the 2025 national tour

== Principal casts ==
Role	Sydney	National tour
Role	2022	2025
Helena	Natalie Abbott	Natalie Abbott
Demetrius	Blake Appelqvist	Jason Arrow
Oberon	Stellar Perry	Stellar Perry
Puck	Monique Sallé	Jayme-Lee Hanekom
Hermia	Brittanie Shipway	Loren Hunter
Lysander	Jerrod Smith	Mat Verevis
