= Mary Malone (actress) =

British actress

- Born: ca. 2000; Suffolk, England
- Education: East 15 Acting School
- Occupation: Actress
- Years active: 2022–present

Mary Malone is an English actress born approximately in 2000. On television, she is known for her roles in the Doctor Who Christmas special "The Church on Ruby Road" (2023) and the Netflix series Missing You (2025). She is also known for her theatre work.

== Early life and education ==
Malone was born in Suffolk, England.

She described herself as "a bit of an outcast kid", who spent a lot of time online gaming, finding friends there. At school, she played Gregor the insect in a stage production of Franz Kafka's The Metamorphosis, and found that she enjoyed acting.

Malone graduated from East 15 Acting School at the University of Essex, which she attended for three years from 2017, graduating in 2020. She also studied theatre-making. In her graduation year, she had minor roles in the Starz series The Girlfriend Experience (2016) and Sky Arts' A Play in a Day.

== Career ==
After completing her training courses, Malone had stage roles in Abigail Thorn's play The Prince at the Southwark Playhouse, and in Josie Rourke's production of As You Like It at @sohoplace in 2022. Malone played Phoebe, in a cast led by Leah Harvey and Rose Ayling-Ellis, and also including Malone's sister Allie Daniel. Also in 2022, she appeared in the long-running ITV crime drama Vera and the Channel 4 comedy-drama Chivalry.

On 25 December 2023, Malone played Trudy, a friend of Ruby, in the Doctor Who Christmas special titled "The Church on Ruby Road".

Malone appeared in the first British production of Australian creator's Yve Blake musical Fangirls in August 2024, and her face appeared on the posters advertising the show. She played the character Jules, whom she described as a mean girl and "iconic bitch".

In 2025, she had a main role as Aqua in the Harlan Coben adaptation of Missing You on Netflix.

She has also appeared in short films, including Octopus (2022) by Ella Glendining, where she appeared alongside Annabelle Davis, and Shrimp (2025) by Yasser Zadeh.

== Personal life ==
Malone is a transgender woman, who came out and transitioned sometime during or after her late teens. She is also a skilled artist, singer, puppeteer, pianist, and writer. She has posted several of her paintings, using acrylics and mixed media on canvas, on Instagram.

She has a sister, Allie Daniel, also an actress. They both appeared in Josie Rourke's 2022 production of As You Like It.

== Recognition and awards ==
In January 2023 Malone won Best Supporting Performer in a New Production of a Play in the BroadwayWorld UK / West End Awards, for her role in The Prince.
