= Jillian Broadbent =

Australian public figure and businesswoman

Jillian Broadbent AC FRSN
- Born: Jillian Rosemary Broadbent; 23 April 1948 (age 78); Sydney, New South Wales, Australia
- Organization: Director of the Sydney Dance Company

Jillian Rosemary Broadbent (born 1948) is an Australian economist and businesswoman. She has served on the boards of many organisations, encompassing finance, the arts, and other sectors. Broadbent was chancellor of the University of Wollongong for 11 years up until late 2020.

== Early life and education ==
Jillian Rosemary Broadbent was born on 23 April 1948. She is the daughter of John Raymond Broadbent (Major General).

She attended Ravenswood School for Girls, and at the age of 16 enrolled at the University of Sydney, where graduated with the degrees of Bachelor of Arts majoring in economics, and mathematics.

== Banking career ==
Broadbent begun her career as an economist with the Reserve Bank of Australia.

She spent 30 years in the banking sector in Australia and overseas, latterly as a senior executive and departmental head at Bankers Trust Australia.

== Board and other roles ==
From 2005 to 2006 she was president of Chief Executive Women.

From 2011 until 2017, Broadbent was inaugural chair of the Clean Energy Finance Corporation. In 2017 she (along with Graeme Samuel and John Laker) formed a panel of inquiry into the culture of the Commonwealth Bank.

In the commercial sector, Broadbent has served on the boards of Macquarie Bank, Woolworths, and Macquarie Group. She has also served in arts and non-profit organisations, including the boards of SBS, the National Portrait Gallery, Sydney Theatre Company, the National Institute of Dramatic Art, and Sydney Dance Company. She was a founding director of the Australian Brandenburg Orchestra.

Broadbent was chancellor of the University of Wollongong (UOW) for 11 years, until September 2020.

She also has been a director of the Australian Securities Exchange, Special Broadcasting Service and Qantas.

== Awards and honours ==
In 2001, Broadbent was awarded the Centenary Medal "for service to Australian society in business leadership".

In 2003, she was appointed an Officer of the Order of Australia for service to economic and financial development of Australia.

On Australia Day 2019, Broadbent was appointed a Companion of the Order of Australia "for eminent service to corporate, financial, clean energy and cultural organisations, to higher education, and to women in business".

In 2018 she was elected as a Fellow of the Royal Society of New South Wales.

Broadbent holds honorary degrees from Western Sydney University (2000) and the UOW (2021).

Ben Quilty's 2021 portrait of her hangs in UOW's new Arts and Social Sciences building, which was named after her in recognition of her role as the University's third chancellor.

Academic offices
Preceded by Mike Codd	Chancellor of the University of Wollongong; 2009–2020	Succeeded by Christine McLoughlin
