= Van Badham =

Australian writer and social commentator (born 1974)

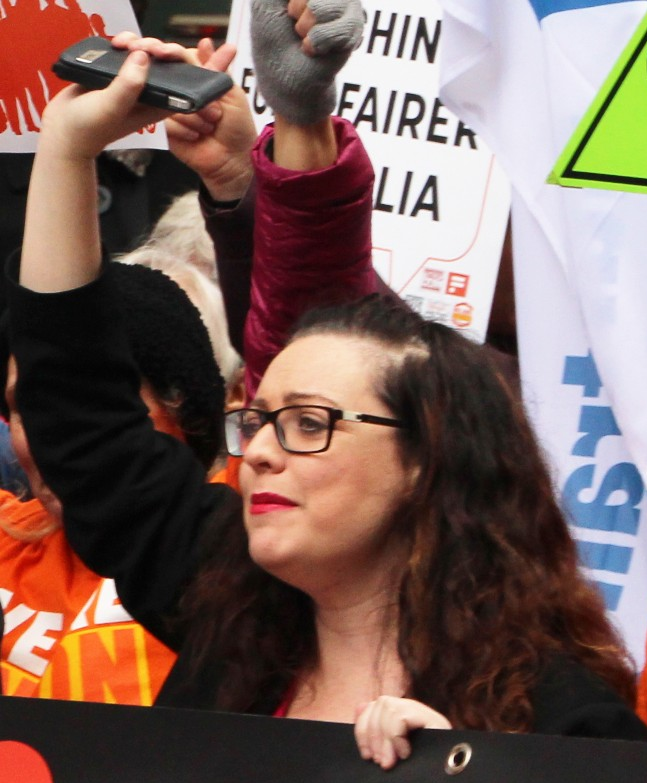
- Van Badham at a 2014 march in Melbourne
- Born: 1974 (age 51–52); Sydney, Australia
- Occupations: Writer, social commentator
- Years active: 2002–present

Vanessa Badham (born 29 November, 1974) is an Australian writer and activist. A playwright and novelist, she writes dramas and comedies. She is a regular columnist for the Guardian Australia website.

== Early life and education ==
Vanessa Badham was born in Sydney in 1974. Her parents worked in the New South Wales gaming and track industry, with her father eventually working as a manager in the registered club industry.

She studied creative writing and performance at the University of Wollongong, graduating with Bachelor of Arts and Bachelor of Creative Arts (Honours) degrees. At university, Badham won the Philip Larkin Poetry Prize in 1997, and the Des Davis Drama Prize and Comedy Prize in 2000. In 2001, she went on an exchange with the University of Sheffield in the UK to study English literature.

At the University of Wollongong she was drawn into student politics and left-wing activism, and was elected editor of the Student Representative Council newspaper, Tertangala. She worked with the Student Union as Media Officer and Women's Officer, and sat on the Academic Senate and University Internationalisation Committee. While a student, she was associated with anarchist and anarcho-syndicalist causes; more recently, she has described her politics as democratic socialist.

In 2013, she completed a Master of Arts degree with first class honours in Theatre at the Victorian College of the Arts, University of Melbourne.

== Career ==
=== Stage ===
In 1999 Badham won the Naked Theatre Company's first "Write Now!" play competition and with it a production of her winning play, The Wilderness of Mirrors, at the Sydney Theatre Company's Wharf studio. About secret service infiltration of an activist organisation, the play brought her to public attention and she began to stage more work across Australia.

In 2001, she relocated to the United Kingdom. Her work was discovered by the Crucible Theatre in Sheffield, who staged a collaborative production of Kitchen with Nabokov Theatre in 2001. A play about marriage as a metaphor for capitalism, it then toured to the 2002 Edinburgh Festival Fringe, Her 2003 play Camarilla was a critical success at the 2003 Edinburgh Festival Fringe, cementing Badham's international reputation as a proponent of radical political theatre.

Badham was appointed literary manager of London's Finborough Theatre in 2009 and worked there until relocating to Melbourne to become an artistic associate at the Malthouse Theatre from 2011 to 2013.

In Australia, her plays have had mainstage seasons at Griffin Theatre, Malthouse Theatre, The Sydney Theatre Company, and Black Swan State Theatre Company.

The world premiere of The Questions, a musical co-written by Badham with Richard Wise, was staged by the State Theatre Company of South Australia, in July/August 2024, directed by Mitchell Butel. It opened to excellent reviews.

=== Other writing ===
In 2009 it was announced that Badham had been signed for a three-book deal by Pan Macmillan Australia. Her first book, Burnt Snow, was released in September 2010. In November 2021 she released her debut non-fiction book with Australian independent publisher Hardie Grant Books, Qanon and On.

== Media career ==
In 2013 Badham began writing political commentary and arts criticism for the Guardian Australia website.

Her commentary has also appeared in publications The New York Times, Bloomberg, The Irish Times, Der Freitag, The Sydney Morning Herald, The Age, Women's Agenda, Australian Cosmopolitan, and Daily Life. As a commentator, she has been a guest of The Drum on ABC Television, Politics HQ on Sky News Australia, Radio National, Sunrise and The Project and appeared many times as a panellist on the ABC's Q&A programme.

She has also been a featured speaker at the Wheeler Centre, Festival of Dangerous Ideas, All About Women festival, Melbourne Writers Festival and Australian Council of Trade Unions National Congress.

== Other activities ==
As of 2021 Badham is also an ambassador for the National Secular Lobby.

== Recognition and awards ==
In 1999 Badham won the Naked Theatre Company's first "Write Now!" play competition for her play, The Wilderness of Mirrors.

Other awards for her theatre work include the 2005 Queensland Premier's Literary Award for Black Hands / Dead Section, the 2014 New South Wales Premier's Literary Award for Muff, and the 2014 Western Australian Premier's Book Awards for The Bull, the Moon and the Coronet of Stars.
