= Wollongong Undergraduate Students' Association =

Students' union at the University of Wollongong

University of Wollongong Undergraduate Students' Association
- Abbreviation: WUSA
- Formation: 1960s
- Type: Student union
- Location: Northfields Avenue, University of Wollongong
- President: Hanzel-Jude Pador (Labor Left)
- General Secretary: Caitlin Veigel (Labor Left)
- Main organ: WUSA Council
- Subsidiaries: Tertangala
- Affiliations: National Union of Students (Australia)
- Website: www.uow.edu.au/student/representatives/wusa/

The University of Wollongong Undergraduate Students' Association (known as WUSA, and its governing body the WUSA Council) is the principal student union at the University of Wollongong (UOW), New South Wales. Besides representing the campus students' interests, WUSA provides them with specific welfare services.

WUSA was affiliated to the National Union of Students (Australia) and has participated in national campaigns including the fight against upfront course fees, Voluntary Student Unionism, and the struggle to reinstate free Higher Education in Australia. WUSA has also called upon the national body and other student organisations to support its local causes in the past.

The sister student organisation for WUSA is the Newcastle University Students' Association.

In 2016, WUSA held a referendum to end affiliation with the National Union of Students. The campaign to disaffiliate, led by a group called WEXIT 2016, saw the motion passed. However, only 27 votes were cast in total causing significant controversy. WUSA reaffiliated with the NUS in 2019.

In the years since WUSA has actively participated in a number of campaigns, including leading the opposition to the controversial degree in Western Civilization, creating a campaign to fight for free menstrual products on the Wollongong campus, and participating in a number of anti-war protests, including Palestine.
