= University of Wollongong =

Public university in Wollongong, New South Wales, Australia

- Crest (Note: This is a crest. Coat of arms are generally registered with a heraldic authority.)
- Former name: Division of University of New South Wales (1951–1975)
- Motto: Stands for purpose
- Type: Public research university
- Established: 1951 (established); 1975 (independence)
- Accreditation: TEQSA
- Academic affiliations: Utrecht Network
- Budget: A$913.15 million (2023)
- Visitor: Governor of New South Wales (ex officio)
- Chancellor: Greg West (acting)
- Vice-Chancellor: Max Lu
- Academic staff: 1,103 (2022)
- Administrative staff: 1,388 (2022)
- Total staff: 2,491 (2022)
- Students: 31,908 (2022)
- Undergraduates: 22,741 (2022)
- Postgraduates: 6,994 coursework (2022); 1,482 research (2022)
- Other students: 691 non-award (2022)
- Location: Northfields Avenue, Keiraville, Wollongong, New South Wales, 2500, Australia; 34°24′24″S 150°52′46″E
- Campus: 82.4 hectares (203.6 acres); Urban, regional and parkland with multiple sites
Colours
Dark blue, white, bright blue and red
- Sporting affiliations: UniSport; EAEN
- Mascot: Baxter the Duck
- Website: uow.edu.au

The University of Wollongong (UOW) is an Australian public research university located in the suburb of Keiraville, within the coastal city of Wollongong, New South Wales, approximately 80 kilometres (50 mi) south of Sydney. As of 2023, the university had an enrolment of more than 33,000 students (including over 12,300 international students), an alumni base of more than 176,000 [LC1] and over 2,400 staff members including 16 distinguished professors.

In 1951, a division of the New South Wales University of Technology (known as the University of New South Wales from 1958) was established in Wollongong for the conduct of diploma courses. In 1961, the Wollongong University College of the University of New South Wales was constituted and the college was officially opened in 1962. In 1975 the University of Wollongong was established as an independent institution. Since its establishment, the university has conferred more than 120,000 degrees, diplomas and certificates. Its students, originally predominantly from the local Illawarra region, are now from over 150 countries, with international students accounting for more than 37 percent of total.

The University of Wollongong has developed into a multi-campus institution, both domestically and globally. The Wollongong campus, the university's main campus, is on the original site 5 kilometres (3 mi) north-west of the city centre, and covers an area of 82.4 hectares (204 acres) with 94 permanent buildings. In addition, there are regional university campuses in Bega, Batemans Bay, Moss Vale and Shoalhaven, as well as three Sydney campuses, including the UOW Sydney Business School, UOW Liverpool and UOW Sutherland. Beyond Australia, UOW has campuses in Dubai, Hong Kong, India and cities in Malaysia. UOW has also established partnerships with a number of international education institutions in China and Singapore.

== History ==
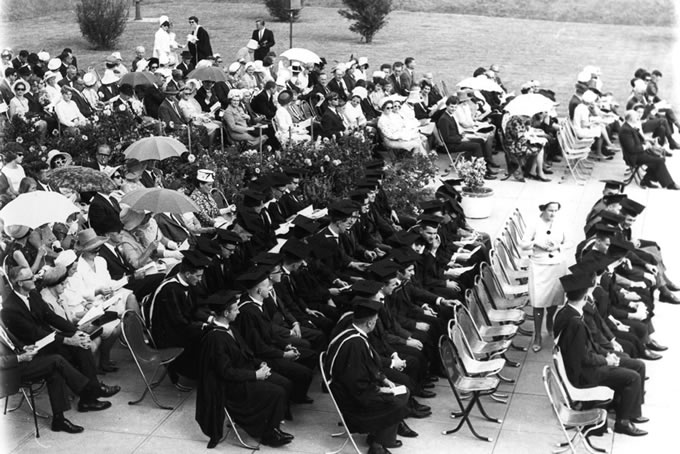
The graduation ceremony (held in 1966) was held out of doors, a feature of the open-air ceremony of the 1960s.

Over 60 years, the university has grown from a provincial feeder college with 300 students to an international university with over 33,000 students spread across nine domestic campuses and four international centres.

=== Establishment ===
The University of Wollongong traces its origins to 1951. The foundation of the university was in 1951 when a division of The New South Wales University of Technology (currently known as the University of New South Wales, UNSW) was established in Wollongong. In 1962, the division became the Wollongong College of the University of New South Wales.

On 1 January 1975, the New South Wales Parliament incorporated the University of Wollongong as an independent institution of higher learning consisting of five faculties (including engineering, humanities, mathematics, sciences and social sciences) with Michael Birt as its inaugural vice chancellor. In 1976, Justice Robert Marsden Hope was installed as chancellor of the university. As of 1982, the university amalgamated the Wollongong Institute of Higher Education which had begun life in 1962 as the Wollongong Teachers' College; thus the merger formed the basis for a period of rapid growth in the 1980s.

=== Further development ===
In 1951, a foundation of the University of Wollongong was founded as a division of the New South Wales University of Technology in Wollongong. A decade later, the division became the Wollongong College of the University of New South Wales.

In 1972, the library was three storeys high and could fit 280 students. In 1975, the University of Wollongong gained its autonomy as an independent institution of higher learning by the Parliament of New South Wales. In 1976, the library expanded and could fit 530 students.

In 1977, the Faculty of Computer Science (currently known as the Faculty of Engineering and Information Sciences) developed a version of Unix for the Interdata 7/32 called UNSW 01, this was the first non-PDP Unix. In the late 70s, Tim Berners-Lee sourced TCP/IP software, an integral element of the World Wide Web, from the University of Wollongong.

In 1981, Ken McKinnon was appointed Vice-Chancellor, overseeing the amalgamation of the university with the Wollongong Institute of Education (also known as WIE) in 1982. The Wollongong Institute of Education had originated in 1971 as the Teachers College (renamed the Wollongong Institute of Education in 1973). This merger formed the basis of the contemporary university. In 1983, the Faculty of Commerce was established along with the School of Creative Arts, followed by the creation of the Faculty of Education in 1984. Also in 1984 the commencement of the new Wollongong University building program began, which led to the construction and opening of the Illawarra Technology Centre (1985), Kooloobong (1985, 1986, 1990), Weerona College (1986), Administration, Union Mall (now known as UniCentre), URAC (1987), multi-storey carpark (1990) and heated swimming pool (1990).

In 1993, the University of Wollongong Dubai Campus in Dubai, the United Arab Emirates was established.

In 2000, the Shoalhaven campus was opened at Nowra on the South Coast. The Bega campus was also opened. In 2001, the Southern Highlands campus opened at Moss Vale.

In 2008, the university opened the first building at Wollongong Innovation Campus (abbreviated as iC) on a 20-hectare site at Brandon Park in Wollongong. In August, the Faculty of Science Dean, Rob Whelan, took up a new role as president of the University of Wollongong in Dubai.

In October 2009 Chancellor Mike Codd retired as chancellor after three four-year terms. He was succeeded by Jillian Broadbent.

In July 2010, the New South Wales Health Minister, Carmel Tebbutt, opened the $30 million Illawarra Health and Medical Research Institute. In August, a $20 million building housing the Sydney Business School and the UOW/TAFE Digital Media Centre opened at the Innovation Campus. The centre was named the Mike Codd Building in honour of a former chancellor. In 2014, work began on the $20 million iAccelerate building at the Innovation Campus (iC), which offers space for up to 200 budding entrepreneurs to develop their ideas.

In 2017, the University of Wollongong South Western Sydney campus opened on Moore Street in Liverpool.

In October 2020 Christine McLoughlin succeeded Jillian Broadbent as chancellor. Michael Still took over the role in 2024.

In June 2026, Still stood aside from his position as chancellor following the decision of the Independent Commission Against Corruption to investigate the University of Wollongong. Greg West became acting chancellor.

=== Overseas expansion ===
In 1993 the University of Wollongong in Australia opened what was to become the University of Wollongong in Dubai (UOWD) in the United Arab Emirates. Initially called the Institute of Australian Studies (IAS), this centre made UOW the first foreign university to open a campus in the UAE, and the first Australian tertiary institution represented in the Persian Gulf region, as well as one of the earliest tertiary institutions founded in the UAE. IAS initially offered English language programs, before becoming a "feeder college" by 1995, where students completed part of a degree in business or IT in Dubai before coming to Australia to complete their studies. In 1999, it was the first foreign-owned institution in the world to be issued a licence from the federal government of the United Arab Emirates, and was formally opened as University of Wollongong, Dubai Campus in October 2000. It was officially incorporated as University of Wollongong in Dubai in 2004 and at present it has over 4,000 students from almost one hundred countries.

== Campuses and buildings ==
The University of Wollongong comprises nine campuses in Australia:

=== Wollongong ===
The Wollongong campus, as the university's main campus, is located on the New South Wales coast, 3 kilometres (2 mi) from the centre of Wollongong and 80 kilometres (50 mi) south of Sydney. It is served by the North Wollongong railway station which opened in 1915 on South Coast railway line.

Courses are offered across three faculties, condensed in 2026: the Faculty of the Arts, Society & Business, the Faculty of Engineering & Information Sciences, and the Faculty of Science, Medicine & Health. All together, nearly 33,000 students attend classes along with around 2,400 staff on the Wollongong campus. Apart from the teaching and research buildings, the campus includes student residences, conference facilities, food halls, supermarket, cafes, restaurants, a bar, conference facilities, indoor sports centres and gymnasium, swimming pool and sports fields. The Wollongong campus is also home to UOW College.

=== UOW Liverpool ===
In 2016 The University of Wollongong expanded the growing South West Sydney region, with a campus in the Liverpool CBD taking its first cohort of students in 2017. The campus is expected to expand over the next several years.

=== Innovation Campus ===
The Innovation Campus, abbreviated as iC, is located in Wollongong, New South Wales. The campus was established with seed funding from the New South Wales government and has received ongoing support from the federal and state governments as well as the Wollongong City Council and was established to drive partnerships and collaboration between the research and business communities by co-locating commercial and research organisation.

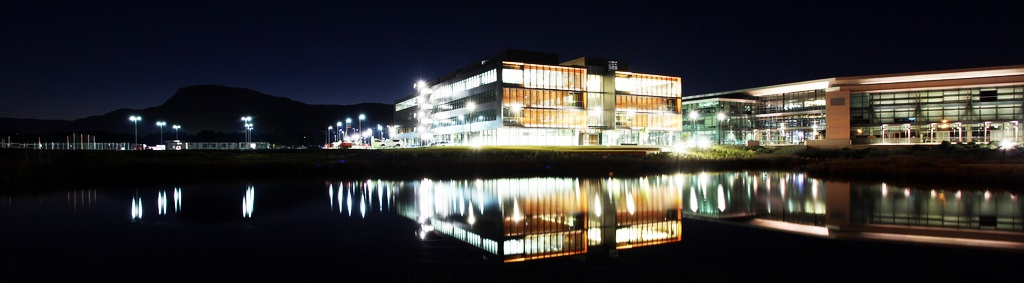
The Innovation Campus at night

=== Sydney Business School ===
The Sydney Business School, which was established in 1997, is the graduate school of UOW's Faculty of Business and offers postgraduate business programs at the Sydney CBD Campus located at Darling Park, adjacent to Darling Harbour, and UOW's Wollongong Campus.

=== Regional campuses ===
- Batemans Bay, New South Wales
- Bega, New South Wales
- Liverpool, New South Wales
- Southern Sydney (Loftus), New South Wales
- Shoalhaven, New South Wales
- Southern Highlands (Moss Vale), New South Wales
  - The Southern Highlands campus opened a new building designed by Australian architect Glenn Murcutt in May 2007.

=== Overseas Campus ===
==== Dubai ====
- The University of Wollongong in Dubai (commonly referred to as the University of Wollongong Dubai Campus), abbreviated as UOWD, was established by the University of Wollongong in Australia in 1993 and is located in Knowledge Village KV 14 and 15 Dubai, United Arab Emirates. The university is one of the United Arab Emirates' oldest universities. The campus employs over 4,000 staff and has a student cohort of over 4,000 from almost one hundred countries. While affiliated to the University of Wollongong, UW Dubai remains a separate and autonomous institution.

==== Malaysia ====
- The University of Wollongong Malaysia (commonly referred to as the University of Wollongong Malaysia Campus), abbreviated as UOW Malaysia, was established by the University of Wollongong in Australia in November 2019 and is located in Shah Alam, Selangor, Malaysia.

==== Hong Kong ====
- The University of Wollongong College Hong Kong was established as the Community College of City University in 2004. It was later renamed as UOW College Hong Kong.

== Governance and structure ==
=== Faculties and departments ===
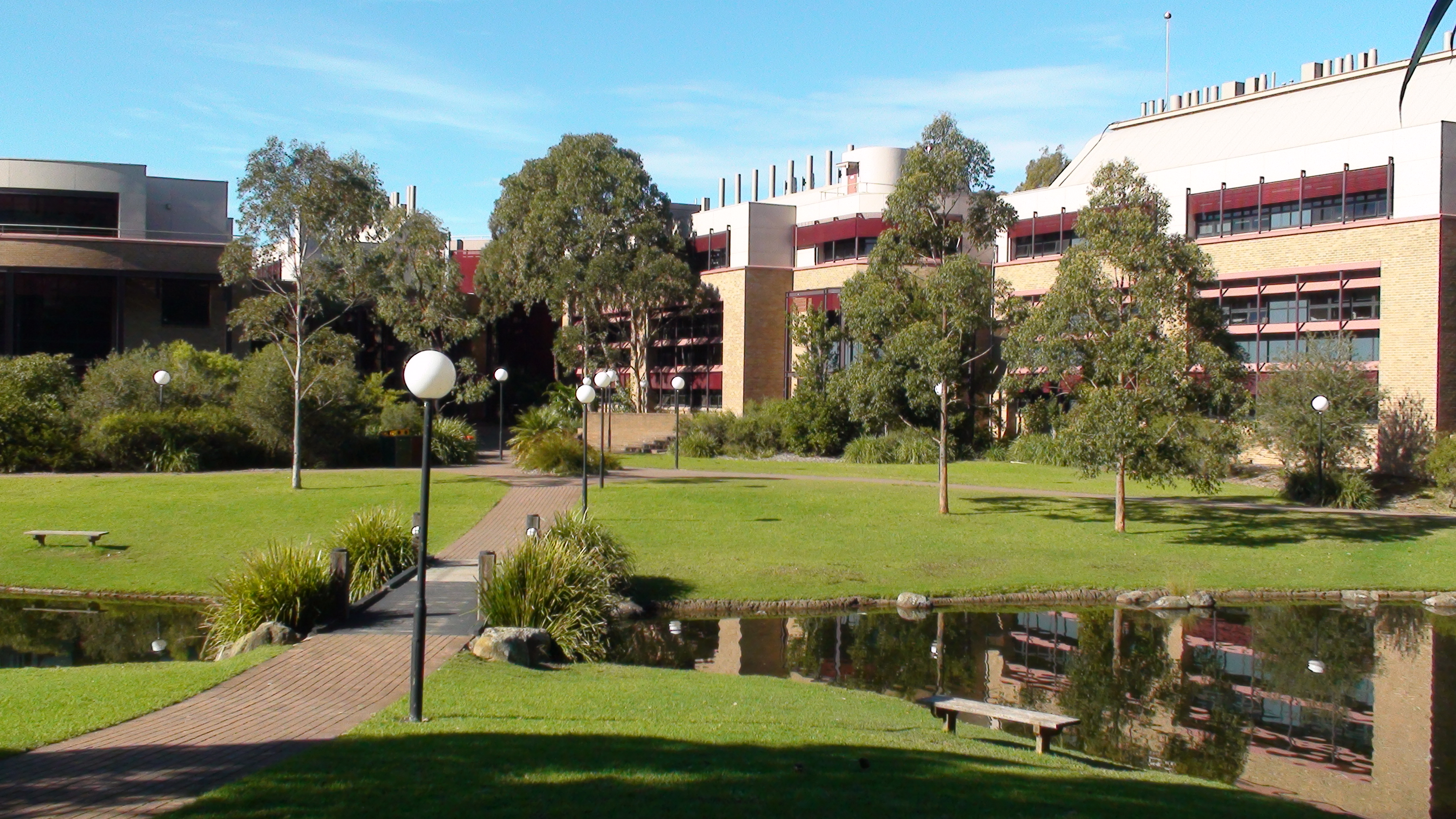
The science buildings at the Wollongong Campus

The University of Wollongong has three faculties.

Faculty of the Arts, Society and Business

- School of Business
- School of Creative Arts and Humanities
- School of Education
- School of Law
- School of Liberal Arts
- School of Social Sciences
- Early Start Research
- Sydney Business School, University of Wollongong
- Australian National Centre for Ocean Resources & Security

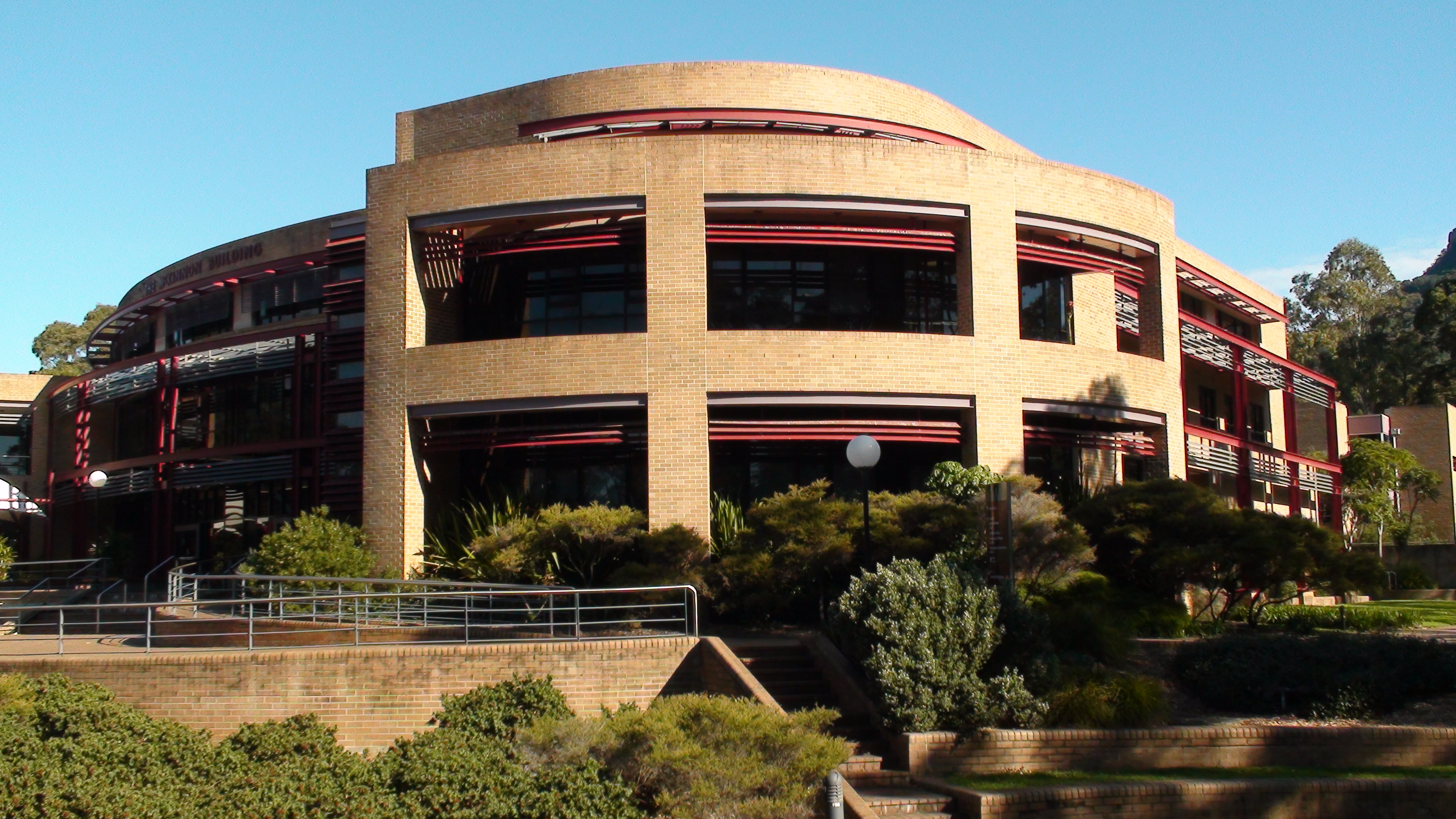
The McKinnon Building at the Wollongong Campus, named after former Vice-Chancellor Ken McKinnon

Faculty of Engineering and Information Sciences

- School of Computing Science and Information Technology
- School of Engineering
- School of Maths, Physics and Chemistry
- Australian Steel Research Hub
- Sustainable Buildings Research Centre

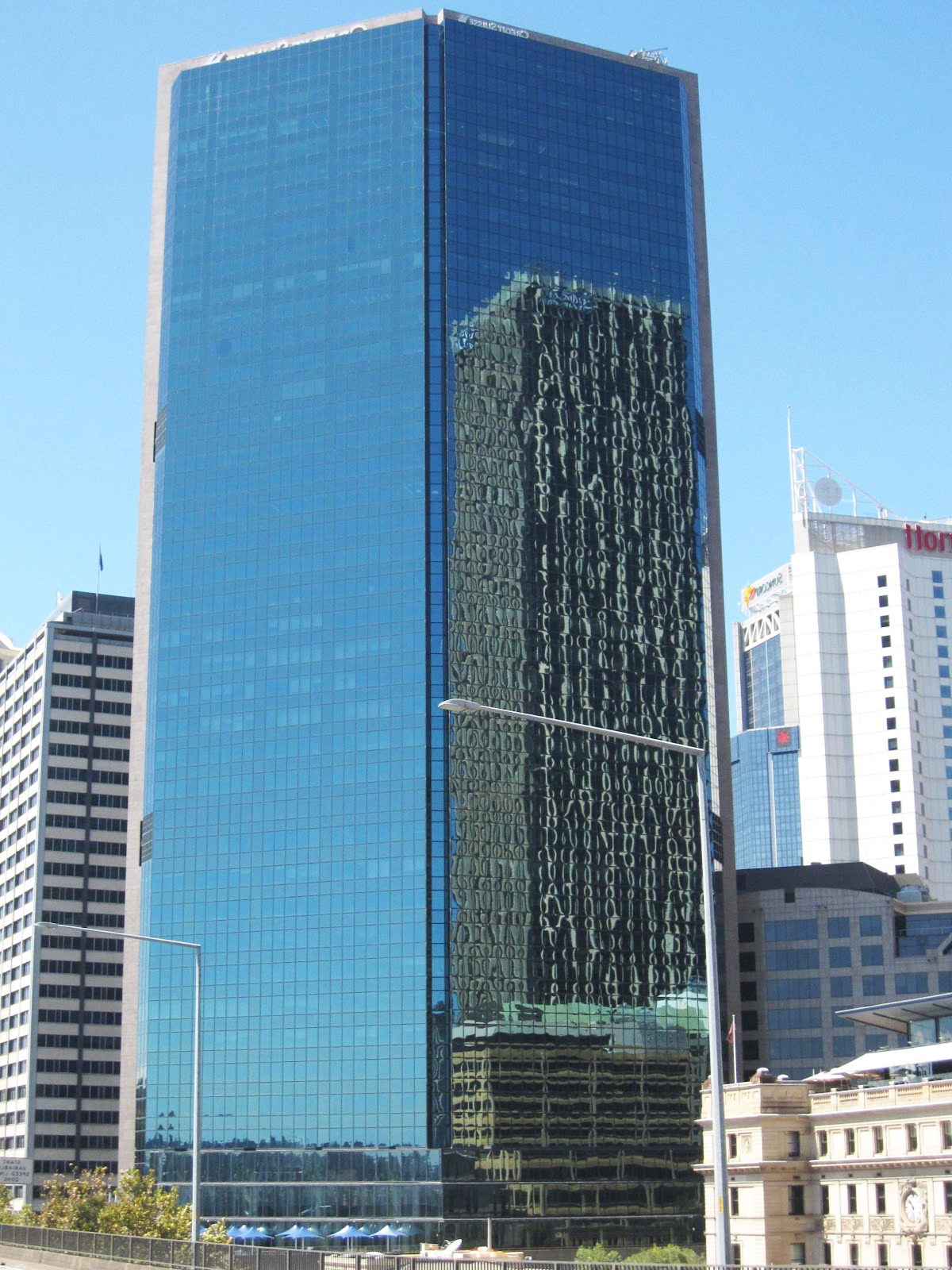
The Sydney Business School's Circular Quay Campus

Faculty of Science, Medicine and Health

- School of Medical, Indigenous and Health Sciences
- School of Nursing
- School of Psychology
- School of Science
- Graduate School of Medicine

=== Memberships and affiliations ===
The University of Wollongong has affiliated to a number of associations and organisations:

- The Member of the Association to Advance Collegiate Schools of Business (AACSB)
- The Member of the Association of Commonwealth Universities (ACU)
- The Member of the Australian European Network (AEN), related to the Utrecht Network
- The Member of the Association of Southeast Asian Institutions of Higher Learning (ASAIHL)
- The Prominent Member of the Apple University Consortium (AUC)
- The Member of the International Association of Universities (IAU)
- The Member of Universities Australia
- The Member of the University Global Partnership Network
- The Member of the NUW (Newcastle, UNSW, Wollongong) Alliance
- Jubilee Oval in Kogarah, New South Wales, is commercially known as "UOW Jubilee Oval".

== Academic profile ==
=== Research and publications ===
- Excellence in Research for Australia University Rankings 2018 – UOW is ranked 10th in Australia by the Australian Research Council.

=== Research divisions ===
The university's Innovation Campus is home to the iAccelerate Centre, housing over 280 start-up entrepreneurs.

==== Major research entities ====
- The Australian Institute of Innovative Materials
- Early Start Research Institute
- The Sustainable Buildings Research Centre
- Australasian Health Outcomes Consortium

===== Other research entities =====
- Advanced Manufacturing Technologies
- Australian Centre for Cultural Environmental Research
- Australian National Centre for Ocean Resources and Security
- Centre for Archaeological Science
- Centre for Medical & Molecular Bioscience
- Centre for Medical Radiation Physics
- Early Start Research Institute
- Engineering Materials
- Future of Rights Centre
- GeoQuEST Research Centre
- National Institute for Applied Statistical Research Australia

==== International research ====
The University of Wollongong has formed key alliances with a number of international corporations and organisations:

- Co-operation between the Geological Survey Organisation of Indonesia and the GeoQuEST Research Strength.
- Members of the Institute for Social Transformation Research participating in numerous international networks dedicated to understanding the causes and implications of social change and cultural transformation. Current collaborative projects engage with research centres in Japan, Sweden, Malaysia, the UK and elsewhere.
- Research partnerships between CAPSTRANS and a range of research groups in the Asia Pacific.
- The Intelligent Polymer Research Institute (IPRI) has developed global linkages with research institutions in the US, Japan, South Korea, China, Ireland, France, New Zealand, Singapore, Thailand and the United Kingdom working on multifunctional, stimuli-responsive materials for various applications.
- The Smart Foods and Public Health Centre is collaborating with research groups in Finland, Sweden, the US and Spain.

=== Libraries and databases ===
The University of Wollongong has multiple libraries across its campuses.

=== Tuition, loans and financial aid ===
For international students starting in 2024, the indicative total tuition fees range from A$30,528 to A$201,360 for award programs lasting at least one year. Domestic students (Note: According to the Higher Education Support Act 2003, domestic students include permanent residents and New Zealand citizens in addition to Australian citizens.) may be offered a federally-subsidised Commonwealth Supported Place (CSP) which substantially decreases the student contribution amount billed to the student. The maximum student contribution amount limits that can be applied to CSP students are dependent on the field of study.

Since 2021, Commonwealth Supported Places have also been limited to 7 years of equivalent full-time study load, calculated in the form of Student Learning Entitlement (SLE). Students may accrue additional SLE under some circumstances (e.g. starting a separate one-year honours program) or every 10 years. Domestic students are also able to access the HECS-HELP student loans scheme offered by the federal government. These are indexed to the Consumer or Wage Price Index, whichever is lower, and repayments are voluntary unless the recipient passes an income threshold.

The university also offers several scholarships, which come in the form of bursaries or tuition fee remission.

=== Academic reputation ===
University rankings

Global – Overall
- ARWU World: 301–400 (2025)
- CWTS World: 331 (Note: The CWTS Leiden Ranking is based on P (top 10%).) (2024)
- QS World: =184 (2026)
- QS Employability: 181–190 (2022)
- THE World: 201–250 (2026)
- USNWR Global: =212 (25/26)

National – Overall
- ARWU National: 14–20 (2025)
- CWTS National: 16 (2024)
- ERA National: 10 (2018)
- QS National: 13 (2026)
- THE National: 11–13 (2026)
- USNWR National: 15 (25/26)
- AFR National: =8 (2025)

In the 2024 Aggregate Ranking of Top Universities, which measures aggregate performance across the QS, THE and ARWU rankings, the university attained a position of #198 (13th nationally).

National publications

In the Australian Financial Review Best Universities Ranking 2025, the university was tied #8 amongst Australian universities.

Global publications

In the 2026 Quacquarelli Symonds World University Rankings (published 2025), the university attained a tied position of #184 (13th nationally).

In the Times Higher Education World University Rankings 2026 (published 2025), the university attained a position of #201–250 (tied 11–13th nationally).

In the 2025 Academic Ranking of World Universities, the university attained a position of #301–400 (tied 14–20th nationally).

In the 2025–2026 U.S. News & World Report Best Global Universities, the university attained a tied position of #212 (15th nationally).

In the CWTS Leiden Ranking 2024, the university attained a position of #331 (16th nationally).

=== Student outcomes ===
The Australian Government's QILT (Note: Abbreviation for Quality Indicators for Learning and Teaching.) conducts national surveys documenting the student life cycle from enrolment through to employment. These surveys place more emphasis on criteria such as student experience, graduate outcomes and employer satisfaction than perceived reputation, research output and citation counts.

In the 2023 Employer Satisfaction Survey, graduates of the university had an overall employer satisfaction rate of 86%.

In the 2023 Graduate Outcomes Survey, graduates of the university had a full-time employment rate of 77.5% for undergraduates and 90.1% for postgraduates. The initial full-time salary was A$70,000 for undergraduates and A$106,100 for postgraduates.

In the 2023 Student Experience Survey, undergraduates at the university rated the quality of their entire educational experience at 80.4% meanwhile postgraduates rated their overall education experience at 75.8%.

== Student life ==
=== Student union ===
The Wollongong Undergraduate Students' Association produces the magazine Tertangala, and many other services including representation, advocacy and student support. Postgraduate representation is provided by the Wollongong University Postgraduate Association, a member of the Council of Australian Postgraduate Associations.

Wollongong UniCentre, an on-campus organisation and controlled entity of the university, provides the social and commercial infrastructure on the campus, administering the UniBar, student clubs and societies, food outlets, entertainment and activities, a books and news shop and other student services.

The geographical and social centre of the university is the Duck Pond Lawn, and its surrounding eateries and other facilities, including the UniBar. The UniBar serves alcoholic drinks and a small range of lunch foods. The UniBar building was opened by Colin Markham MP, Simon Zulian Student Rep, Nigel Pennington UniCentre GM and Gerard Sutton VC on 14 May 2001. The UniBar has since won numerous awards including the Major Award and the Public Building Award of the Architectural Design Awards held in Wollongong in 2003, the "ACUMA" award for Best New Campus Facility and the Master Builders Award for Excellence in Construction by Camarda and Cantril.

In line with Commonwealth legislation introduced in October 2011, the University of Wollongong instated the Student Services and Amenities Fee. This fee was charged to student depending on their study load and location, and has been used to upgrade and subsidise existing facilities and install new facilities such as common barbecue areas.

=== Sports and athletics ===
==== Rugby ====
The Wollongong University RC (or UOW Mallee Bulls) competes in the Illawarra Rugby Union premiership. The club plays their home games at the University Oval, Wollongong. The Mallee Bulls wear red, white and blue jerseys. The club fields three senior teams and a women's side.

The University of Wollongong Titans (or UOW Titans) is a former rugby league football team that was part of Country Rugby League and competed in the Illawarra Rugby League premiership.

=== Residential colleges ===
The university has a number of residential college and halls of residence:

- Bangalay
- Campus East
- Graduate House
- International House
- Kooloobong Village

I-House is the oldest residential college of the University of Wollongong and is an affiliate of the 16 International Houses Worldwide. It provides accommodation to approximately 218 students who are attending the University of Wollongong. It is situated at the corner of Porter and Hindmarsh Avenue in North Wollongong, near the North Wollongong railway station.

Residents of the residential college are predominantly undergraduate students, with some postgraduate students also accommodated. International House provides catered, dormitory style accommodation. There are 218 beds, 14 shared rooms (28 beds) and 190 single rooms.

=== Exchange programs ===
The University of Wollongong has 180 global partners, offering international short course and study abroad programs, and internships.

Exchange destinations

Asia-Pacific

- Hong Kong, Indonesia, Japan, Malaysia, Singapore, South Korea, Thailand, China & New Caledonia

Europe

- Denmark, Finland, France, Germany, Ireland, Italy, Macedonia, The Netherlands, Norway, Spain, Sweden, Switzerland, Turkey & the United Kingdom

Americas

- Brazil, Canada, Mexico & the United States of America

Utrecht Network

- Austria, Belgium, Czech Republic, Denmark, Estonia, Finland, France, Germany, Greece, Hungary, Iceland, Ireland, Italy, Latvia, Lithuania, Malta, the Netherlands, Norway, Poland, Portugal, Romania, Slovakia, Slovenia, Spain, Sweden, Switzerland & the United Kingdom

Dubai Study Program

- University of Wollongong in Dubai

== Notable people ==
=== Notable alumni ===
As of 2023, the university has turned out more than 176,000 graduates, and also has alumni members all over the world in 199 countries. Although a large number of alumni live in Wollongong and Sydney, and a significant number also live in Melbourne, Brisbane, Canberra, Singapore, Kuala Lumpur, Hong Kong, Bangkok, London, New York and Washington, D.C.

== Controversies ==
In 2016, the university awarded a controversial PhD to Judith Wilyman, in which she was alleged to advocate a vaccine conspiracy theory. The university received criticism over this decision, but the university cited the need to permit 'freedom of opinion', and noted that the thesis passed the university's assessment procedures.

The university has been criticised for their handling of reported sexual assaults. One case highlighted the way in which the university claimed to "assist" a student after the student alleged sexual assault by another student. News Limited reported that the university did not take any disciplinary action against the alleged perpetrator, instead advising the victim to change behaviour, with the victim adding: "Nothing happened to him. Instead I was told to make all the changes". For self-protection the victim independently succeeded in taking out an Apprehended Violence Order via the courts against the alleged. Karen Willis, the executive officer of Rape and Domestic Violence Services Australia, described the actions of the university as "disgraceful", as it placed the "onus and responsibility on the person who has experienced violence". The university responded that its instructions are "standard procedure", it "does not comment on specific allegations", and it is not able to investigate sexual assault claims, as those must be investigated by the NSW Police. Another alleged victim considers their sexual assault and UoW's "response to be equally despicable."

Between 2011 and 2016, there were 40 officially reported cases of sexual assault, harassment or misconduct on campus, resulting in no expulsions, one suspension and three reprimands. Freedom of information investigations reported by News Limited suggest this may represent "just the tip of the iceberg ... due to under-reporting". In contrast, the 2017 Australian Human Rights Commission report on sexual assault and harassment found reported figures substantially higher than this.

== See also ==
- List of universities in Australia
- List of University of Wollongong people
- University of Wollongong in Dubai
