= Bombshells (play) =

2004 play written by Joanna Murray-Smith

- Cover shows Caroline O’Connor in Bombshells. Photos: Jeff Busby
- Author: Joanna Murray-Smith
- Cover artist: Ned Hoste, 2H
- Language: English
- Genre: Play
- Publisher: Currency Press
- Publication date: 2004
- Publication place: Australia
- Media type: Print (Paperback)
- ISBN: 978-0-86819-751-7

Bombshells is a play by Australian playwright Joanna Murray-Smith.

== Synopsis ==
Six monologues made famous by the diva Caroline O'Connor, exposing six women balancing their inner and outer lives with humour and often desperate cunning. They range in age from a feisty teenager to a 64-year-old widow yearning for the unexpected.

== First production ==
Bombshells was first presented by Melbourne Theatre Company at the Fairfax Theatre, Victorian Arts Centre, Melbourne, Australia, on 28 December 2001, with the following production team:

- Performer: Caroline O'Connor
- Director: Simon Phillips
- Designer: Shaun Gurton
- Composer: Elena Kats-Chernin
- Lighting Designer: David Murray

This production was revived at the same venue from 26 February 2004 and transferred to the York Theatre, Seymour Centre, Sydney, Australia, from 30 April 2004.

A reduced version—consisting of four monologues—was presented as part of the Edinburgh Festival Fringe at the Assembly Rooms, Edinburgh, Scotland, from 6 August 2004. The performer again was Caroline O’Connor, directed by Simon Phillips.

This production—now consisting of all six monologues—transferred to the Arts Theatre, London, England, on 3 September 2004.

Four of the monologues from Bombshells were televised by the Australian Broadcasting Corporation in November 2003.
