= Mackenzie (play) =

2026 play by Yve Blake

- Music: Yve Blake
- Lyrics: Yve Blake
- Book: Yve Blake
- Setting: 2006–2011
- Basis: Macbeth by William Shakespeare
- Premiere: 6 June 2026: The Neilson Nutshell, Sydney
- Productions: 2026 Sydney, Melbourne; 2027 Australia tour

Mackenzie is an Australian stage play with 5 original songs by Yve Blake. It is a modern satirical adaptation of William Shakespeare's tragedy Macbeth.

== Premise ==
Set in the early 2000s, the story follows a 13 year old child star Mackenzie with her merciless stage mum.

== Production ==
In 2025, there were sold-out read-throughs events in Melbourne, Sydney and in London.

The world premiere production will open in Sydney’s The Neilson Nutshell on 6th June until 18th July 2026, before a limited run in Melbourne’s Arts Centre on 23rd July to 9th August 2026.

A national tour will commence in 2027.

== Principal cast ==
The original cast are as follows:

Role	Performer
Mackenzie	Kimberley Hodgson
Ruth	Nikki Britton
Beau and others	Ryan González
Gayle and others	Billie Palin
Dahlia and others	Anusha Thomas
Producer and others	Jane Watt
