= Sue Smith (writer) =

Australian screenwriter and playwright

Sue Smith is an Australian screenwriter and playwright.

== Biography ==
She is best known for writing or co-writing Australian television productions including Mabo, Bastard Boys, RAN, The Road from Coorain, The Leaving of Liverpool, and Brides of Christ. Her screenwriting for film includes Peaches and co-writing Saving Mr. Banks. Since 2006 she has also written for the stage, with plays including Hydra, Machu Picchu, Kryptonite, The Kreutzer Sonata (an adaptation of the Tolstoy novella) and Strange Attractor, and the libretto to the opera Rembrandt's Wife.

== Awards ==
Smith received AACTA/AFI Awards as a screenwriter for RAN and Bastard Boys and as a co-screenwriter for Brides of Christ and The Leaving of Liverpool.

She received the Australian Writers' Guild's Lifetime Achievement Award in 2018.

In 2018, she became a STC Patrick White Playwrights Fellow.
