= Yve Blake =

Australian theatre writer

- Born: Sydney, New South Wales, Australia
- Occupations: Screenwriter, songwriter, playwright
- Writing career
- Notable work: Fangirls
- Website: yveblake.co

Yve Blake is an Australian screenwriter, songwriter, and playwright. She wrote the musical Fangirls.

== Career ==
Yve Blake was born in Sydney, Australia, and as a teenager took drama classes at the Australian Theatre for Young People. After moving to England to study at the Central School of Speech and Drama, Blake dropped out and developed her play Sugar Sugar as part of the Royal Court Theatre's Young Playwright's program. The play had its Australian premiere in Melbourne in 2014. That year, her next play Then sold out at London's Vault Festival, and she returned to the Vault in 2015 with Lie Collector, a musical comedy. Then was later performed in Australia by the Australian Theatre for Young People.

In 2019, Blake's musical Fangirls premiered at Queensland Theatre. The musical won the 2019 Sydney Theatre Award for Best Production of a Mainstage Musical, the 2019 Matilda Award for Best Musical or Cabaret, the 2020 AWGIE Award for Music Theatre, and the 2022 Green Room Award for New Australian Writing for Music.

== Productions ==
- Prince Willy (2012)
- Am I Good Friend? (2012)
- The Finish Line (2013)
- Sugar Sugar (2014)
- Then (2014)
- Lie Collector (2015)
- Fangirls (2019)
- Mackenzie (2026)
