= Ozanam House =

There are multiple notable buildings known as Ozanam House:

- Ozanam House, Ipswich in Queensland, Australia
- Ozanam House, Sydney in New South Wales, Australia
