= Inside (2024 film) =

Australian prison drama film

- Theatrical release poster
- Directed by: Charles Williams
- Screenplay by: Charles Williams
- Produced by: Kate Glover; Marian Macgowan
- Starring: Cosmo Jarvis; Guy Pearce; Vincent Miller; Tammy Macintosh; Toby Wallace
- Cinematography: Andrew Commis
- Production companies: Simpatico Films; Never Sleep Pictures; Macgowan Films
- Distributed by: Lionsgate+
- Release dates: 9 August 2024 (Melbourne International Film Festival); 27 February 2025 (Australia); 17 September 2026 (Lionsgate+)
- Running time: 104 minutes
- Country: Australia
- Language: English

Inside is a 2024 Australian prison drama film from writer/director Charles Williams and starring Guy Pearce. The film was theatrically released in Australian cinemas on 27 February 2025 and in the US on 20 June 2025.

== Premise ==
In an adult prison, Mel (Vincent Miller) grapples with guilt over his childhood crime while writing an atonement letter to his victim. He is celled with notorious inmate Mark Shepard (Cosmo Jarvis), a now-reformed prisoner. As Mel wrestles with his violent impulses, he becomes embroiled in a plot to murder Shepard, driven by guilt and a contract for the kill. Meanwhile, Warren (Guy Pearce), another inmate with his own demons, guides Mel’s choices. A complex bond forms between them as they navigate themes of redemption and sacrifice.

== Cast ==
- Cosmo Jarvis as Mark Shepard
- Guy Pearce as Warren
- Vincent Miller as Mel Blight
- Tammy Macintosh as Colleen
- Toby Wallace as Adrian Murfett
- Chloé Hayden as Tara
- Fletcher Humphrys as Gerry Munt
- Michael Logo as Noel

== Production ==
=== Development ===
The film was directed by Charles Williams, who also wrote the screenplay. Inside is his feature film debut. Williams was awarded the Palme d’Or at the 2018 Cannes Film Festival his short film All These Creatures.

In order to achieve a high degree of authenticity in his film, Williams researched for years in prisons throughout Australia, but above all in his native Victoria.

The film received funding from Screen Australia and Melbourne International Film Festival (MIFF) Premiere Fund and Screen NSW in 2023. Bonsai Films distributed for Australia and New Zealand, Quiver Distribution for North America with Goodfellas handling international sales.

=== Casting ===
Guy Pearce was confirmed as leading the cast in September 2023. Later in December, Cosmo Jarvis and Vincent Miller were confirmed to join the cast.

=== Filming ===
Principal photography took place in Melbourne in 2023, and wrapped on December 19, 2023. Parts of the film were shot on location at Malmsbury Youth Justice Centre and the newly constructed Western Plains Correctional Centre.

== Release ==
The film premiered in the Bright Horizons competition selection at the 2024 Melbourne International Film Festival on 9 August 2024.

It was theatrically released in Australia on 27 February 2025.

Inside had its North American premiere at the 2025 Tribeca Festival on 7 June, followed by a US theatrical release on 20 June.

The film was released on Netflix in Australia on 1 September 2025.

== Reception ==
On review aggregator Rotten Tomatoes, Inside holds a score of 97% based on 30 critics' reviews, with an average rating of 7.4/10. The website's critics consensus reads, "With unflinching authenticity and haunting, deeply layered performances, Inside transforms its stark prison-based narrative into a gripping, emotionally resonant study of violence, regret, and the fragile possibility of redemption."

It was widely praised by critics, citing it as Guy Pearce's "finest work", Cosmo Jarvis' turn "Oscar-worthy", Vincent Miller's performance "a revelation." and that Williams "makes his way into the pantheon of great Australian directors."

David Erlich at Indiewire gave the film his critic's pick, writing "Williams’ debut is so replete with such moments of raw compassion that it almost invisibly accumulates a deep well of emotion." While Emma Vine at Loud and Clear reviews proclaimed the film as "One of the best of the year."

== Accolades ==
Inside won Best Film, Best Lead Actor (Guy Pearce), Best Screenplay (Charles Williams) and Best Director (Charles Williams) at the Film Critics Circle of Australia Awards.

Williams also received the award for Best Original Feature Film Screenplay at the 57th AWGIE Awards.
