= Peter Carroll (actor) =

Australian actor (born 1944)

Peter Carroll AM
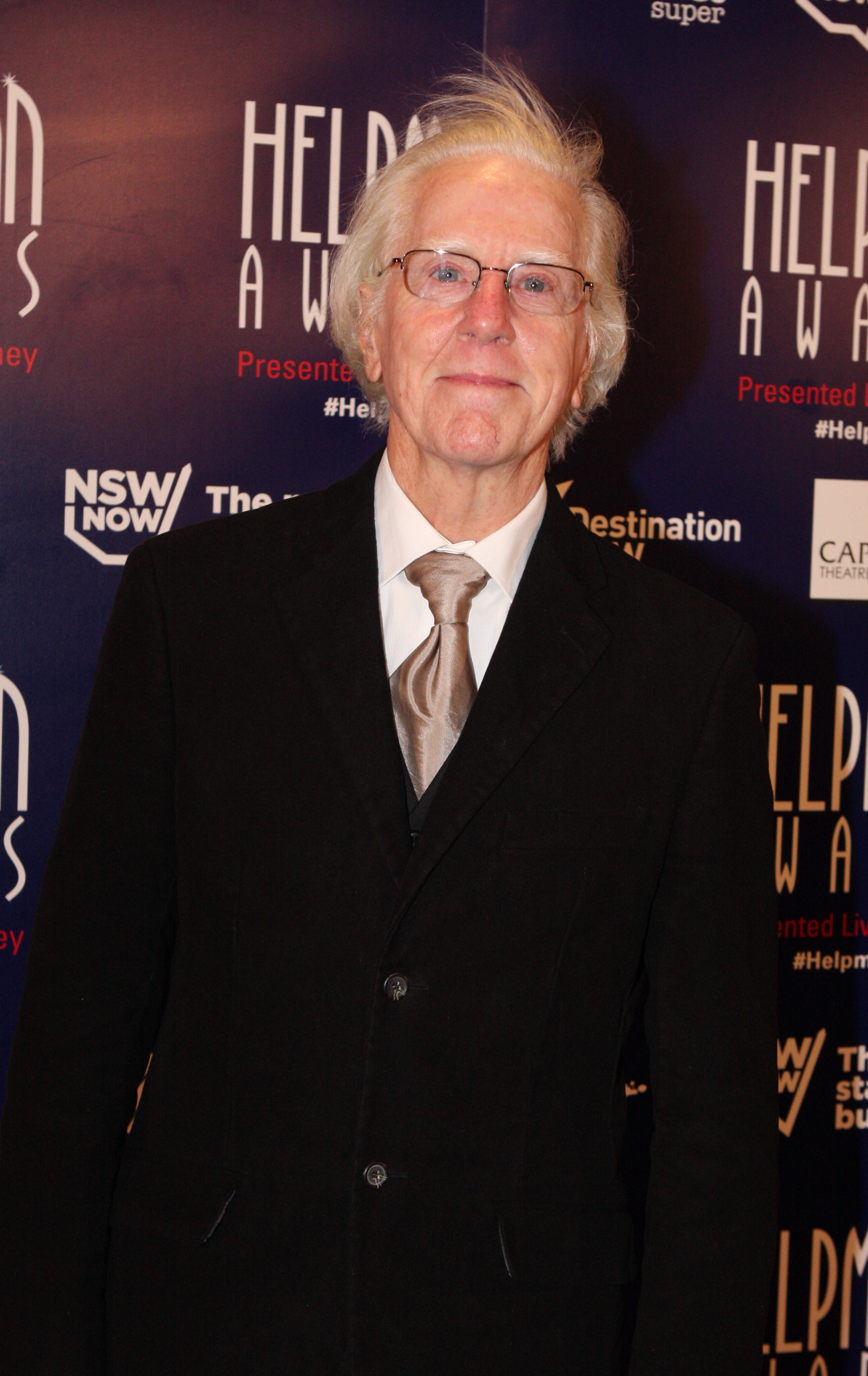
- Carroll at the 2015 Helpmann Awards
- Born: Peter John Carroll; 1944 (age 81–82); Sydney, New South Wales, Australia
- Other name: Peter Carol
- Education: University of Sydney; University of New South Wales; Central School of London
- Occupations: Actor; performer; writer; assistant director; singer; vocal coach; stage manager; narrator
- Years active: 1961–present
- Known for: Five Mile Creek (1983–1985); Melba (1987); The Christian Brothers (stage show) (1975 onwards)
- Children: Tamsin Carroll

Peter John Carroll AM (born 1944) is an Australian actor and the father of actress Tamsin Carroll.

== Early life and education ==
Peter Carroll was born in Sydney, New South Wales in 1944 and grew up in Greenwich on Sydney’s lower north shore. He was educated by the Marist Brothers during the 1950s. In his youth, Carroll was a boy soprano and won five awards in the City of Sydney Eisteddfodd in 1963.

Carroll attended the University of Sydney, where he earned a Bachelor of Arts, and the University of New South Wales, where he earned a Master of Arts with Honours. While undertaking his education at the University of Sydney, he commenced amateur acting, After graduating, he worked as a drama teacher for two years.

Carroll later attended the Central School of London, where he studied Speech and Drama. He also has a Diploma in Education from Sydney.

== Career ==
Carroll was part of a group of actors and directors who ushered in the new wave in Australian theatre. His first professional stage role was in a 1961 production of Roundup on the Moon at the Pocket Playhouse in Sydney. He gained early stage experience with regular performances at the Genesian Theatre, one of Sydney's longest established theatre companies. He then became an integral part of the formative days at Sydney's Nimrod Theatre Company.

Carroll has performed in numerous plays, including classics by Shakespeare, Sophocles, Euripides, George Bernard Shaw, Chekhov, Oscar Wilde, Ibsen, T. S. Eliot, Samuel Beckett, Schiller, Bertolt Brecht and Oliver Goldsmith, as well as works from Australian playwrights such as David Williamson, Ron Blair, Nick Enright, Patrick White and Peter Kenna. He has also taken on musical theatre including Les Miserables, Andrew Lloyd Webber’s Cats, Evita and Jesus Christ Superstar (in which he played Pontius Pilate), and the title role in Sweeney Todd. His signature role was in Ron Blair's one-man play The Christian Brothers, having performed in the debut production at Nimrod Theatre in 1975, directed by John Bell. He has gone on to portray the role several times, winning a Mo Award for his performance in a 2001 Sydney Theatre Company production of the show.

Carroll has acted alongside his daughter Tamsin Carroll in several stage shows including Harbour and The Republic of Myopia, for Sydney Theatre Company. They also appeared together in a 1998 production of Stephen Sondheim’s Into the Woods, with the Melbourne Theatre Company – collaborating on the play once more in 2023, for Belvoir. His most recent stage role was in a Sport for Jove production of The Player Kings: Shakespeare and Marlowe's History Cycle in 2025.

Carroll has also appeared in numerous television series, including period drama The Sullivans in 1982. Other credits that same year included Aliens, Time Lapse, Limbo City, Issues and Learned Friends. He then played Charlie Withers in the western series Five Mile Creek, which featured Nicole Kidman in an early role. Carroll's daughter, Tamsin, also appeared in the series as an extra. His other notable credits include the miniseries Melba (1988) starring Hugo Weaving, in which he played David Mitchell, and Changi (2001). He also featured in Grass Roots, playing the recurring role of Reverend Peter Summerhaze from 2000 to 2003.

Further miniseries credits include Ride on Stranger (1979), The Dismissal (1983), Cyclone Tracy (1986), Captain James Cook (1987), The Rainbow Warrior Conspiracy (1988), Cassidy (1989) and The Farm (2001). He has also had guest roles in Cop Shop, Rafferty's Rules, Water Rats, Farscape, Tales of the South Seas, Corridors of Power, Rake, Bloom, The Letdown, Bump, Colin from Accounts, Heartbreak High and Optics.

More recently, Carroll played recurring roles in comedy series Aftertaste and The Moth (both in 2021).

Carroll has also appeared in many feature films including 1977 Peter Weir mystery drama The Last Wave, 1978 Fred Schepisi drama The Chant of Jimmie Blacksmith, 1978 newsroom drama Newsfront and 1980 children's film Fatty Finn (based on the classic 1930s comic strip) alongside Bryan Brown. He also featured in 1986 Robyn Nevin drama The More Things Change..., 1990 romantic drama The Crossing (starring Russell Crowe in an early role) and 1998 British comedy Waking Ned.

He continued acting in films throughout the 2000s, including 2000 drama A Wreck A Tangle, and 2001 political drama Black and White, opposite Robert Carlyle, Charles Dance and Ben Mendelsohn. Carroll voiced a character in the 2006 George Miller animated musical comedy Happy Feet opposite a Hollywood-strong cast including Nicole Kidman, before appearing in 2011 erotic drama Sleeping Beauty and 2018 romantic comedy-drama Crazy Rich Asians. He most recently appeared in 2021 Academy Award-winning Jane Campion western The Power of the Dog, alongside Benedict Cumberbatch and Kirsten Dunst. He has also appeared in several made-for-television films including Hamlet and Spoiled (both 1974), Cass (1978), The John Sullivan Story (1979), Who Killed Baby Azaria? and A Descant for Gossips (both 1983), Australia's Faceless (1986), Doom Runners (1997) and The Diamond of Jeru (2001) as well as several short films. Carroll has also narrated several television films and documentaries.

Additionally, Carroll worked as a dialogue coach on the 1986 international hit comedy Crocodile Dundee starring Paul Hogan, and was also a voice coach on the 1995 film All Men Are Liars.

Carroll was a member of Actors Equity of Australia and chaired the National Performance Conference and the Federal Actors’ Council. He also served as a board member for SBS television.

== Honours ==
Carroll was honoured with a Member of the Order of Australia for "significant service to the performing arts as an actor", in the 2021 Queen's Birthday Honours.

In 2003, Carroll received an honorary Doctorate of Creative Awards from the University of Wollongong.

== Awards ==
Year	Association	Category	Work	Result
1977	Queen's Jubilee	Medal for the Arts		Honoured
1978	Australian Film Institute Awards	Best Supporting Actor	The Chant of Jimmie Blacksmith	Nominated
1986	Green Room Awards	Best Male Performer	Master Class	Won
1986	Green Room Awards	Best Actor	The Season at Sarsaparilla	Won
1988	Variety Club of Australia Awards	Musical Theatre Actor of the Year	Sweeney Todd	Won
1988	Penguin Award	Best Performance by a Male in a Drama Series	Rafferty's Rules	Won
1988	Sydney Theatre Critics' Circle Award	Significant Contribution to Sydney Theatre	Lifetime Achievement Award	Honoured
1988	Mo Awards	Best Actor in a Musical	Sweeney Todd	Nominated
1989	Green Room Awards	Best Supporting Actor in a Musical	Les Misérables	Nominated
1992	Mo Awards	Best Supporting Musical Theatre Performer	Man of La Mancha	Won
1992	Mo Awards	Best Supporting Male Musical Theatrical Performer	Jesus Christ Superstar	Won
1995	Green Room Awards	Best Actor	Hamlet	Won
2001	Mo Awards	Best Actor	The Christian Brothers	Won
2001	Glugs Theatrical Awards	Male Performer	Brothers	Won
2001	Glugs Theatrical Awards	Best Performer in a Musical	Lush	Won
2001	Mo Awards	Best Actor	The Christian Brothers	Won
2002	Helpmann Awards	Best Male Actor in a Play	The Christian Brothers	Nominated
2003	Helpmann Awards	Best Male Actor in a Supporting Role in a Play	Endgame	Won
2004	Helpmann Awards	Best Male Actor in a Musical	The Republic of Myopia	Nominated
2007	Helpmann Awards	Best Male Actor in a Play	The Season at Sarsaparilla	Nominated
2008	Green Room Awards	Best Male Performer	The Season at Sarsaparilla	Nominated
2009	Play Inaugural Awards	Lifetime Achievement from MEAA		Honoured
2015	Helpmann Awards	Best Male Actor in a Play	Oedipus Rex	Nominated
2018	Helpmann Awards	Best Male Actor in a Supporting Role in a Play	The Resistible Rise of Arturo Ui	Nominated
2022	Sydney Theatre Awards	Best Performer in a Supporting Role in a Mainstage Production	The Tempest	Won

== Theatre ==
Year	Title	Role	Type
1961	Roundup on the Moon		Pocket Playhouse
1962	Queen of Hearts		Genesian Theatre, Sydney
1962	Major Barbara		Pocket Playhouse
1962	Our Hearts Were Young and Gay		Genesian Theatre, Sydney
1962	Wakefield Mystery Plays		Cell Block Theatre, Sydney
1962	Hubert and Arthur		Genesian Theatre, Sydney
1962	Anchor Nugget		Pocket Playhouse
1963	An Ideal Husband		Pocket Playhouse
1963	Hobson's Choice		Genesian Theatre, Sydney
1963	Emma		Genesian Theatre, Sydney
1963	The Alchemist		Genesian Theatre, Sydney
1963	The Journey of the Three Kings		Genesian Theatre, Sydney
1964	She Stoops to Conquer		Genesian Theatre, Sydney
1964	Much Ado About Nothing		Genesian Theatre, Sydney
1964	Richard III		Genesian Theatre, Sydney
1964	The Tragedy of Antony and Cleopatra		Genesian Theatre, Sydney
1965	The Golden Legend		Genesian Theatre, Sydney
1965	Adam's Apple		Genesian Theatre, Sydney
1967	The Swan		Genesian Theatre, Sydney
1970	Blood Wedding		Old Tote Theatre, Sydney
1971	The Trial of Lucullus		NIDA, Sydney
1971	The Tragedy of King Richard II		Genesian Theatre, Sydney
1971	Hippolytus		Old Tote Theatre, Sydney
1972	Wakefield Mystery Plays	Christ	Hobart City Hall for Tasmanian Arts Festival
1972	Antigone		NIDA, Sydney
1973	Back to Methuselah		NIDA, Sydney
1973	Spoiled	Schoolmaster	Independent Theatre, Sydney
1984	The Seagull	Dr Dorn	Nimrod, Sydney
1984	Jesters	Jack	Nimrod, Sydney
1984	The Bacchoi	Pentheos	Nimrod, Sydney
1984	Well Hung		Nimrod, Sydney
1984	Kookaburra		Nimrod, Sydney
1984	My Foot, My Tutor		Nimrod, Sydney
1975	The Ride Across Lake Constance		Nimrod, Sydney
1975	Ginge's Last Stand	Ginger Meggs	Nimrod, Sydney
1975	Richard III	Claren / Tyrell	Nimrod, Sydney
1975–1976	The Christian Brothers	The Christian Brother	National Australian tour with Nimrod, Sydney
1975; 1977	Much Ado About Nothing	Benedick	Nimrod, Sydney, Space Theatre, Adelaide
1976	Mates and Brothers		Playhouse, Perth & Nimrod, Sydney
1976	The Joss Adams Show		Nimrod, Sydney
1976	One of Those Girls		Nimrod, Sydney
1976	It Takes a While to Know One		Nimrod, Sydney
1976	Sextet		Nimrod, Sydney
1976	The Recruiting Officer	Captain Brazen	Nimrod, Sydney
1976	The Duchess of Malfi	Bosloa	National Australian tour
1976	A Handful of Friends	Russell McAlister	Nimrod, Sydney
1977	Murder in the Cathedral	Thomas A. Beckett	New Dolphin Theatre, Perth for Perth Festival
1977	Twelfth Night	Feste / Fabian	Nimrod, Sydney
1978	Wakefield Mystery Plays	Christ	New Fortune Theatre, Perth for Perth Festival
1978	Henry IV Parts 1 & 2	Hotspur Pistol	Nimrod, Sydney
1978–1979	The Christian Brothers	The Christian Brother	National Australian tour with Nimrod, Sydney
1979	A Cheery Soul	Mr Custance / Mrs Jebb / Swaggie	Sydney Opera House with STC
1979	The Caucasian Chalk Circle	Narrator / Ozdak	Sydney Opera House with STC
1979–1980	Twelfth Night	Malvolio	Playhouse, Adelaide with STCSA
1980	The Sunny South	Ivo Carne	Sydney Opera House with STC
1980–1981	Evita	Juan Perón	National Australian tour with Adelaide Festival Centre
1981	Chinchilla	Chinchilla	Sydney Opera House with STC
1982	The Suicide	Semyon	Nimrod Theatre Company
1982	Macbeth		Sydney Opera House with STC
1982	The Perfectionist	Stuart Gunn	Sydney Opera House with STC
1984	As You Desire Me	Bruno Pieri	STC
1984–1986	Master Class	Joseph Stalin	South Australia & Playhouse, Melbourne with The Stage Company, Sydney Opera House with STC,
1985	Jonah Jones	Mr Packard	Wharf Theatre, Sydney & Playhouse, Adelaide with STC
1986	The Madras House		Sydney Opera House with STC
1986	Pearls Before Swine		Belvoir, Sydney & Seymour Centre, Sydney
1987–1988	Emerald City	Colin	Playhouse, Melbourne for MTC
1987–1988	Sweeney Todd	Sweeney Todd	Playhouse, Melbourne, Her Majesty's Theatre, Sydney & Riverstage, Brisbane with MTC
1988	Noel and Gertie	Noël Coward	Wharf Theatre, Sydney with STC / Morley Davis
1988	A Stephen Sondheim Evening		Theatre Royal, Sydney
1988	Hedda Gabler	Tesman	Playhouse, Melbourne with MTC
1989	Summer Rain	Harold	Sydney Opera House with STC
1989	Romeo and Juliet	Friar Laurence	Sydney Opera House with STC
1989	Harold in Italy	Marius	Sydney Opera House with STC
1989	Joan of Arc at the Stake	Brother Dominic	Melbourne Concert Hall with Victoria State Opera for Melbourne Spoleto Festival
1990–1991	Les Miserables	Thenardier	Australia / New Zealand tour with Cameron Mackintosh
1991	Dial M For Murder	Inspector Hubbard	Marian St Theatre, Sydney
1991–1992	Money and Friends	Stephen	National Australian tour with QTC
1992	Uncle Vanya	Uncle Vanya	Sydney Opera House with STC
1992	Jesus Christ Superstar	Pontius Pilate	Harry M. Miller
1992–1993	Joseph and the Amazing Technicolor Dreamcoat	Jacob / Potiphar	State Theatre, Melbourne, Lyric Theatre Brisbane & Her Majesty's Theatre, Sydney with Really Useful Group
1994	Mrs. Warren's Profession	Praed	Marian St Theatre, Sydney
1994	King Lear		Sydney Opera House
1994	The Threepenny Opera	Earl of Gloucester	Sydney Opera House with STC
1994	On Your Dial		Tilbury Hotel, Sydney
1994	Cats	Asparagus / Bustopher Jones / Growltiger	Her Majesty's Theatre, Sydney with Really Useful Group
1994–1995	Hamlet	Polonius / Priest / Francisco / Sailor	Space Theatre, Adelaide & Playhouse, Melbourne with Belvoir, Sydney
1995	The Tempest	Alonzo	National Australian tour with Belvoir, Sydney
1995	The Blind Giant is Dancing	Doug	Belvoir, Sydney
1996	Hamlet	Polonius	National Australian tour with Belvoir, Sydney
1996	Miracle City	Millard Sizemore	Wharf Theatre, Sydney with STC
1996	Heretic	Franz Boaz / Tom Harrison / John Barnes / Professor Stanner & more	National Australian tour with STC
1996	Crazy for You	Bela Zangler	Theatre Royal with Gordon Frost Productions
1997	A Hard God	Martin Cassidy	Playhouse, Adelaide for STCSA
1998	Into the Woods	Mysterious Man / Narrator	Playhouse, Melbourne for MTC
1998	After the Ball	Ron	Sydney Opera House with STC
1998	Navigating	Dick Shaw	Sydney Opera House with STC
1998	Julie Anthony is Lush	Various characters	Wharf Theatre with STC
1998	You're Gonna Love Tomorrow		Sydney Opera House
1999	The Taming of the Shrew	Baptista	Royal Botanic Garden, Sydney with EHJ Productions
1999	She Stoops to Conquer	Sir Charles / Mr Hardcastle	Sydney Opera House with STC
1999	Macbeth	King Duncan / cast	Sydney Opera House with STC
2000	The Sunshine Club	Reverend Morris	Sydney Opera House with STC
2000	Simply Weill		Sydney Opera House with The Follies Company
2000	Troilus and Cressida	Nestor	Melbourne Athenaeum, Playhouse, Canberra, Sydney Opera House with Bell Shakespeare
2001	Lush	Various characters	Sydney Opera House with STC
2001; 2003	The Christian Brothers	The Christian Brother	Sydney Opera House & National Australian tour with STC
2002	Man of La Mancha	Governor/Innkeeper	Regent Theatre, Melbourne & Capitol Theatre, Sydney with Gordon Frost Productions
2002	Endgame	Nagg	Wharf Theatre with STC for Sydney Festival
2004	Harbour	Sandy	STC
2004	The Republic of Myopia	President & Maximillian Sault	Roslyn Packer Theatre with STC
2004	Victory: Choices in Reaction	Clegg	Wharf Theatre with STC
2004	Thyestes	Thyestes	Wharf Theatre with STC
2004	Eureka! The Musical	Governor Hotham	Her Majesty's Theatre, Melbourne with Essgee Entertainment
2005	The Chairs	Poppet	Belvoir St Theatre, Sydney
2005	Stuff Happens	Paul O'Neil / David Manning / Dominique de Villepin	Seymour Centre, Sydney & Comedy Theatre, Melbourne with Belvoir, Sydney
2005	Stella and the Moon Man	Mr Pleiades	Theatre of Image with STC
2005	The Cherry Orchard	Firs	Wharf Theatre with STC
2006	Kookaburra Launch Concert		Lyric Theatre, Sydney
2006	Mother Courage and Her Children	Commander-in-Chief	Wharf Theatre, Sydney with STC
2006	The Lost Echo	Jove	STC
2006	The Bourgeois Gentleman	Jourdain	STC
2007–2008	The Season at Sarsaparilla	Girlie	Sydney Opera House & Playhouse, Melbourne with STC
2007	The Art of War	Brian	Wharf Theatre, Sydney with STC
2007	A Midsummer Night's Dream	Snug / Egius / Mustardseed	STC
2008	The Serpent's Teeth	Basim	Sydney Opera House with STC
2009	The War of the Roses	Northumberland, Gloucester	Sydney Festival & His Majesty's Theatre, Perth for Perth Festival with STC
2009	The Crucible	Giles Corey	Wharf Theatre, Sydney with STC
2009	Happy Days	Willie	Malthouse Theatre, Melbourne & Belvoir, Sydney
2009	The Book of Everything	Father / Bumbiter	Belvoir, Theatre
2009	Peter Grimes	Dr Crabbe	Opera Australia
2010	King Lear	The Fool	National Australian tour with Bell Shakespeare
2010	The Pirates of Penzance	Major-General	Sydney Opera House with Opera Australia
2011	Doctor Zhivago	Alexander	Lyric Theatre, Sydney, Her Majesty's Theatre, Melbourne with Gordon Frost Productions
2011	No Man's Land	Spooner	Bille Brown Theatre, Brisbane & Sydney Opera House with STC & QTC
2012	Old Man	Albert	Belvoir, Sydney for B Sharp
2012–2013	Chitty Chitty Bang Bang	Grandpa Potts	Capitol Theatre, Sydney, Her Majesty's Theatre, Melbourne, Festival Theatre, Adelaide with TML Enterprises
2014	Night on Bald Mountain	Mr Hugo Sword	Malthouse Theatre, Melbourne
2014	The Consul		Fortyfivedownstairs, Melbourne
2014	Oedipus Rex	Oedipus	Belvoir, Sydney
2014	A Christmas Carol	Marley & other characters	Belvoir, Sydney
2015	Seventeen	Tom	Belvoir, Sydney
2015–2016	Krapp's Last Tape	Krapp	Scenic Workshop Adelaide, Theatre Royal, Hobart MONA FOMO Tour with STCSA
2016	The Great Fire	Donald	Belvoir, Sydney
2016	Twelfth Night	Malvolio	Belvoir, Sydney
2017	Mark Colvin's Kidney	David, Bruce & others	Belvoir, Sydney
2017	Macbeth	King Duncan	Dunstan Playhouse, Adelaide with STCSA
2017	Three Sisters	Phillip	Sydney Opera House with STC
2018	The Resistible Rise of Arturo Ui	Dogsborough	Roslyn Packer Theatre with STC
2018	An Enemy of the People	Morton Kiil	Belvoir, Sydney
2019	Mary Stuart	Shrewsbury	Roslyn Packer Theatre with STC
2019	Cat on a Hot Tin Roof	Reverend Tooker	with STC
2019	Life of Galileo	7th Actor	Belvoir, Sydney
2021	The Cherry Orchard	Firs	Belvoir, Sydney
2022	Girl from the North Country	Mr Perry	Australia & NZ tour with GWB Entertainment
2022	The Tempest	Ariel	Roslyn Packer Theatre with STC
2023	Into the Woods	Man / Narrator / Cinderella's father	Hayes Theatre with Belvoir, Sydney
2023	Do Not Go Gentle	Evans	Roslyn Packer Theatre with STC
2023	The Dismissal	Chief Justice Garfield Barwick	Seymour Centre, Sydney
2025	The Player Kings: Shakespeare & Marlowe's History Cycle	Gardener / Duke of York / Francis / Owain Glendower / Silence / Archbishop of Canterbury / King of France / English/French soldier / Earl of Warwick / Peter / Farmer / Archbishop Of Canterbury / Lord Stanley	Seymour Centre, Sydney with Sport for Jove
2025	Coriolanus	Menenius	Arts Centre Melbourne, Sydney Opera House with Bell Shakespeare

== Filmography ==
=== Film ===
Year	Title	Role	Type
1977	The Last Wave	Michael Zeadler	Feature film
1977	Buckley's Chance	Doctor	Short film
1978	The Chant of Jimmie Blacksmith	McCready	Feature film
1978	Newsfront	Newsco scriptwriter	Feature film
1979	Temperament Unsuited		Short film
1980	Anguish		Short film
1980	Fatty Finn	Teacher	Feature film
1980	The Girl Who Met Simone de Beauvoir in Paris	Anderson	Short film
1986	The More Things Change...	Roley	Feature film
1990	The Crossing	Narrator	Feature film
1998	Waking Ned	Villager of Tullymore	Feature film
2000	A Wreck A Tangle	Science Voiceover	Feature film
2000	Sunday	Herb	Short film
2001	Black and White	Viscount Simonds	Feature film
2006	Happy Feet	Elder	Animated feature film
2011	Sleeping Beauty	Man 1	Feature film
2013	En Passant	Theo	Short film
2018	Crazy Rich Asians	Lord Calthorpe	Feature film
2021	The Power of the Dog	Old Gent	Feature film

==== As crew ====
Year	Title	Role	Type
1986	Crocodile Dundee	Dialogue Coach	Feature film
1995	All Men Are Liars	Voice Coach	Feature film

=== Television ===
Year	Title	Role	Type
1974	Hamlet	Marcellus / Fortinbras / Player King	TV movie
1974	Spoiled		TV movie
1978	Cass	Tom	TV movie
1978	Cop Shop	Martin Sadler	2 episodes
1979	The John Sullivan Story	Commissar Petrovic	TV movie
1979	Ride on Stranger	Mervyn Leggatt	Miniseries, 3 episodes
1982	Aliens		
1982	Time Lapse	Politician	
1982	Limbo City	Dean	
1982	The Sullivans		
1982	Issues	Father	
1982	Learned Friends		
1982; 1992	A Country Practice	Mr. Brown / Stewart Innes	3 episodes
1983	Mississippi Challenge	Narrator	TV movie
1983	The Dismissal	Narrator / Liberal Party Official	Miniseries, 1 episode
1983	A Descant for Gossips	Robert Moller	Miniseries
1983	Who Killed Baby Azaria?	Mr. Phillips QC	Docufilm
1983	The Franklin Adventure	Narrator	Documentary
1983–1985	Five Mile Creek	Charles Withers	32 episodes
1984	Eureka Stockade	Narrator	Miniseries
1984	East Meets West	Narrator	Documentary
1986	Whose Baby	Narrator	Miniseries, 2 episodes
1986	Cyclone Tracy	Narrator	Miniseries, 3 episodes
1986	Australia's Faceless Father		TV movie
1987	Melba	David Mitchell	Miniseries, 8 episodes
1987	Captain James Cook	Dr. Daniel Solander	Miniseries, 2 episodes
1988	Custody	Narrator	TV movie
1988	Rafferty's Rules	Percy Eliot	1 episode
1988	The Rainbow Warrior Conspiracy	Louis-Pierre Dillais	Miniseries
1988	Prejudice	Narrator	TV movie
1989	Police State	Narrator	TV movie
1989	Cassidy	Gotham	Miniseries, 2 episodes
1994	Three Men and a Baby Grand	Performer Sammy Swain	
1996	Water Rats	Joseph Craig	1 episode
1997	Doom Runners	William	TV movie
2000	Farscape	Gahv	1 episode
2000	Tales of the South Seas	Spenser	1 episode
2000–2003	Grass Roots	Warwick Marchant / Rev. Peter Summerhaze	Seasons 1–2, 10 episodes
2001	The Farm	Fenwick QC	Miniseries, 3 episodes
2001	Corridors of Power	Voice in Toilet	1 episode
2001	The Diamond of Jeru	Clifton Vandover	TV movie
2001	Changi	Dr. Hurrell	Miniseries, 2 episodes
2001	A Compassionate Rage	Narrator	Documentary
2012	Rake	Judge Walpole	1 episode
2019	Bloom	Old Frank Warlie	1 episode
2019	The Letdown	Dr Julian	1 episode
2021	Aftertaste	Jim	6 episodes
2021	The Moth Effect	Frank	
2021	Bump	Bruce	1 episode
2022	Colin from Accounts	George	1 episode
2024	Heartbreak High	Roger	2 episodes
2025	Optics	Frank Fritz	1 episode

=== Narration (undated) ===
- Stations of the Cross
- Pandas: The Fight for Survival
- D.H. Lawrence
- Pirates of the South Seas
- Wollongong Colliery Dispute
- Children in Distress
