= 57th AWGIE Awards =

Award ceremony for writing of 2024

The 57th annual AWGIE Awards, presented by the Australian Writers' Guild, took place on 13 February 2025 at the Parade Theatre at National Institute of Dramatic Art, Sydney. The ceremony was hosted by comedians Alex Lee and Suren Jayemanne. It honoured the best of writing in feature film, television, documentary, theatre, interactive and gaming, audio, animation and children's television. The nominations were announced on 14 January 2025.

== Winners and nominees ==
Winners are listed first and highlighted in boldface.

=== Film ===
**Feature Film – Original**
- **Inside – Charles Williams**
  - Audrey – Lou Sanz
  - Better Man – Michael Gracey, Oliver Cole, and Simon Gleeson
  - Stubbornly Here – Taylor Broadley
  - Windcatcher – Boyd Quakawoot
**Feature Film – Adapted**
- **Addition – Becca Johnstone; based on the novel by Toni Jordan**
  - Force of Nature: The Dry 2 – Robert Connolly; based on the novel by Jane Harper
**Short Film**
- **Dragon's Breath – Melanie Easton**
  - And the Ocean Agreed – Tanya Modini
  - Breaking Point – Lochie Graham
  - Connected – Kelly Nicholson
  - Housekeepers – Kaede Miyamura
  - The Meaningless Daydreams of Augie and Celeste – Gregory Kelly with Pernell Marsden

=== Documentary ===
**Documentary – Community, Educational, and Training**
- **What is AWGACS? – Peter Mattessi and Mark O'Toole with Matt Willis**
  - Good Setiquette – Neil Triffett
**Documentary – Public Broadcast (Including VOD) or Exhibition**
- **Renee Gracie: Fireproof – Frances Elliott and Samantha Marlowe**
  - Otto by Otto – Karen Johnson
  - The Search for the Palace Letters – Daryl Dellora
  - Twilight Time – John Hughes

=== Television ===
**Television – Serial**
- **EastEnders: "Episode 6705" – Peter Mattessi (BBC UKTV)**
  - Home and Away: "Episode 8054" – Andrew Osborne (Seven Network)
  - Neighbours: "Episode 8983" – Paul Gartside (Network 10)
  - Neighbours: "Episode 8989" – Ceinwen Langley (Network 10)
**Television – Series**
- **Erotic Stories: "Walking Gambit" – Adrian Chiarella (SBS)**
  - The Artful Dodger: "Yankee Dodge" – James McNamara (Disney+)
  - Heartbreak High: "The Grapes of Voss" – Megan Palinkas (Netflix)
  - Territory: "Season 1, Episode 3" – Steven McGregor (Netflix)
  - Total Control: "Season 3, Episode 5" – Pip Karmel (ABC TV)
  - Total Control: "Season 3, Episode 6" – Stuart Page (ABC TV)
**Television – Limited Series**
- **Fake – Anya Beyersdorf and Jessica Tuckwell with Hyun Lee (Paramount+)**
  - Expats – Alice Bell with Lulu Wang, Janice Y. K. Lee, Gursimran Sandhu, and Vera Miao (Prime Video)
  - High Country – Marcia Gardner and John Ridley with Beck Cole (Binge/Showcase)
  - The Tattooist of Auschwitz – Jacquelin Perske with Evan Placey and Gabbie Asher (Stan)
**Comedy – Situation or Narrative**
- **Population 11: "Outback UFO Tours" – Phil Lloyd (Stan)**
  - Gold Diggers: "Hanging Tough" – Jack Yabsley and Wendy Mocke (ABC TV)
  - Gold Diggers: "Wife Material" – Erica Harrison and Jack Yabsley (ABC TV)
  - Mother and Son: "Bad Influence" – Matt Okine and Tristram Baumber (ABC TV)
  - Thou Shalt Not Steal: "There Will Be Murder" – Dylan River and Sophie Miller (Stan)
  - White Fever: "Asian Guy Cherry" – Ra Chapman and Harvey Zielinski (ABC TV)
**Comedy – Sketch or Light Entertainment**
- **The Weekly: "The Week in TV with Margaret Pomeranz" – Rob Hunter (ABC TV)**
  - Gruen: "Hello Dolly" – James Colley, Bec Melrose, Alice Tovey, and Genevieve Fricker with Cameron James (ABC)
  - The Last Year of Television: "2023" – Mitch McTaggart (Binge)

=== Children's Television ===
**Children's Television – 'P' Classification (Preschool – Under 5 Years)**
- **Beep and Mort: "Friends at First Snow" – Amy Stewart (ABC Kids)**
  - Beep and Mort: "Free Melly" – Wendy Hanna (ABC Kids)
  - Beep and Mort: "Grown Ups Grown Downs" – Charlotte Rose Hamlyn (ABC Kids)
**Children's Television – 'C' Classification (Children's – 5-14 Years)**
- **Rock Island Mysteries: "Secrets in the Ice" – Dave Cartel (Nickelodeon)**
  - Planet Lulin: "The Truth Is Really Out There" – Jessica Paine (ABC Me)
  - Rock Island Mysteries: "New Friends" – Trent Roberts (Nickelodeon)
  - Spooky Files: "Welcome to Lake Tranquility" – Marisa Nanakhorn Brown (ABC Me)

=== Audio ===
**Audio – Fiction**
- **Compromised: "The Tourist" – Meegan May**
  - Diversity Work: "Episode 1" – Pearl Tan
  - Hovering: "Episodes 1-3" – Alexander Duncan
**Audio – Non-Fiction**
- **House of Skulls: "The Classroom" and "The City That Bombed Itself" – Marc Fennell with Pallavi Kottamasu**
  - Laya's Way Home: "Episode 1" – Rick Kalowski with Michaela Kalowski
  - Missing Magdalens – Donna Abela

=== Stage ===
**Stage – Original**
- **Summer of Harold – Hilary Bell**
  - Anne Being Frank – Ron Elisha
  - Beyond the Break – Challito Browne
  - Hubris & Humiliation – Lewis Treston
  - Miss Peony – Michelle Law
  - Sex Magick – Nicholas Brown
**Stage – Adapted**
- **The Dictionary of Lost Words – Verity Laughton; based on the novel by Pip Williams**
  - My Sister Jill – Patricia Cornelius; based on her novel
  - On the Beach – Tommy Murphy; based on the novel by Nevil Shute
  - Unprecedented – Campion Decent
**Musical Theatre**
- **The Dismissal: An Extremely Serious Musical Comedy – Book by Blake Erickson and Jay James-Moody; Music and Lyrics by Laura Murphy; conceived by James-Moody**
  - Forgetting Tim Minchin – Jules Orcullo
  - Three Marys – Christine Evans
**Community and Youth Theatre**
- **SAAM – Madelaine Nunn**
**Theatre for Young Audience**
- **Rosieville – Mary Rachel Brown**
  - Lingo Lah Lah – Peter Docker with Adam Edwards
  - The Princess, the Pea (and the Brave Escapee) – Finegan Kruckemeyer

=== Other categories ===
**Animation**
- **Memoir of a Snail – Adam Elliot**
  - My Jumper, It Roars! – Isabella Spagnolo
  - Space Nova: "The Twister" – Thomas Duncan-Watt (9Go!/ABC TV)
**Interactive Media and Gaming**
- **Stray Gods: The Roleplaying Musical – Liam Esler with David Gaider, Karly Taylor, Tripod, and Montaigne**
  - Hour of the Wolf – Keziah Warner with Matthew Lutton
**Web Series and Other Non-Broadcast/Non-'Subscription Video on Demand' TV Short Works**
- **KingsLand – Jon Rex Williams**
  - Become the One – Adam Fawcett
  - Greystanes – Ryan Cauchi with Matt Ferro
  - Urvi Went to an All Girls School – Urvi Majumdar

=== Special award ===
- The David Williamson Prize for Excellence in Writing for Australian Theatre: The Dismissal: An Extremely Serious Musical Comedy – Book by Blake Erickson and Jay James-Moody; Music and Lyrics by Laura Murphy; conceived by James-Moody
