= Spoiled (play) =

- Poster of original West End production
- Written by: Simon Gray
- Original language: English
- Genre: Drama
- Setting: The home of a schoolmaster

Premiere
- Date premiered: 24 February 1971
- Place premiered: The Close Theatre Club, Glasgow
- Official website

Spoiled is a television and stage play by Simon Gray, first broadcast by the BBC in 1968 as part of The Wednesday Play series and later adapted for the stage. It is set over a single weekend in the house of a schoolmaster, Howarth, who invites one of his O-Level French students to his home to do some last-minute cramming before an exam. Howarth has an almost unnatural enthusiasm, while his student, Donald, is painfully shy. Meanwhile, Howarth's pregnant wife is far from happy about having someone to stay in the midst of her fears about parenting.

== Characters ==
- Howarth
- Donald
- Joanna
- Les
- Mrs Clenham

== Television production ==
Spoiled was originally a play written for the BBC's The Wednesday Play series, broadcast first on 28 August 1968, and again on 9 July 1969. It was directed by Waris Hussein and produced by Graeme MacDonald. Believed to be lost, it had the following cast: The production was wiped after broadcast and no copies are known to exist.

- Howarth- Michael Craig
- Donald - Simon Ward
- Joanna - Elizabeth Shepherd
- Les - Mark Rose
- Mr Wyecroft - Will Leighton
- Mrs Clenham - Carmel McSharry

== Stage ==
Spoiled was adapted by the author for the stage and first performed at the Close Theatre Club, Glasgow, in 1970, directed by Stephen Hollis. It had the following cast:

- Howarth- Daniel Massey
- Donald - David Hayman
- Joanna - Stephanie Bidmead
- Les - Philip Sayer
- Mrs Clenham - Pamela Pitchford

The play was then performed at the Haymarket Theatre, London, also directed by Stephen Hollis, from 24 February 1971. It had the following cast:

- Howarth- Jeremy Kemp
- Donald - Simon Ward
- Joanna - Anna Massey
- Les - Peter Denyer
- Mrs Clenham - Pamela Pitchford

== Australian TV version ==
Spoiled
- Based on: play by Simon Gray
- Written by: Simon Gray
- Starring: Peter Carroll; Judith Fisher; Tony Sheldon
- Country of origin: Australia
- Original language: English

Production
- Producer: John Croyston
- Running time: 110 minutes
- Production company: ABC

Original release
- Network: ABC
- Release: 2 November 1974

The film was adapted for Australian TV in 1974. It was one of a number of stage productions filmed by the ABC in the early 1970s. For Spoiled the ABC filmed an adaptation of a production of the play at the Independent Theatre. Others that year included Hamlet, The Misanthrope and A Hard God.

=== Cast ===
- Peter Carroll as the schoolmaster
- Judith Fisher as his wife
- Michael Fuller
- Tony Sheldon as the boy
- Shirley Summers

=== Reception ===
The Age felt it was "a gay play that had nothing to say... incident outweighed insight."

== Sources ==
- Gray, Simon. Simon Gray: Plays 1. London, Faber and Faber, 2010.
- Spoiled at IMDb
- Simon Gray website
