= Cass (1978 film) =

- Written by: Laura Jones
- Directed by: Chris Noonan
- Starring: John Waters; Michele Fawdon; Max Cullen; Peter Carroll; Anna Volska; Anne Haddy
- Country of origin: Australia
- Original language: English

Production
- Producer: Don Harley
- Running time: 77 mins
- Production company: Grundy Organisation

Original release
- Network: Nine Network
- Release: 30 October 1978

Cass is a 1978 Australian TV movie about a woman returning home and struggling to put her life back together.

== Synopsis ==
Cass (Michele Fawdon) is a film-maker returning to Sydney after a stint filming the traditional lives of the island Mulala people. Her producer Frank (Peter Whitford) conspires to hijack her footage for a TV special, despite Cass having made a vow to the Mulala people that it would only be shown in specialist academic circles.

Cass's doctor husband Mike (John Waters) senses a change in Cass on her return from the islands, and is irritated that she wants to abstain from sex and becoming pregnant. Cass also feels disconnected from her friends and like she no longer fits in.

On her way to an event, Cass stumbles on a couple of hippies, Margo (Judy Morris) and Tom (Peter Carroll), living eco-friendly lives, that shun consumerism and capitalism. Cass proceeds to the event, a formal dinner party full of pretentious people - making her feel further disillusioned. Cassie proposes introducing Mike to the hippies, but he isn’t comfortable with their lifestyle. Cass however, spends time with Margo and their relationship begins to develop.

Cass finally sees the exploitative film that Frank has created from her footage, with a focus on sensationalising the nudity. At a big party full of television personalities, Cassie gets drunk and starts behaving in a strange manner. Mike attempts to drag her away from the party, but Cass races away to see Margo, and they consummate their relationship. When Cass returns home to Mike, they argue, so she visits Tom for a heart to heart chat about how she should deal with her life. Cass returns home again to inform Mike of affair with Margo, but Margo later tells Cass that she’s not interested in settling down with her.

Cass heads off to work, where Frank is pitching the television special to a couple of executives. Cass sneaks into the production office, grabs both the original footage and the edited version, and returns home where she has a big confrontation with Mike. When he tries to sedate her, she escapes and heads to North Head, where she tosses all the film into the ocean. Cass then hits the road, pausing to picking up a couple of hitchhikers.

== Cast ==
- John Waters as Mike Willis
- Michele Fawdon as Cass Willis
- Judy Morris as Margo
- Peter Carroll as Tom
- Max Cullen as Terry, the cameraman
- Peter Whitford as Frank, the producer
- Terry Camilleri as Roger, an editor
- Anna Volska
- Anne Haddy
- Kevin Manser
- James Condon
- Charles McCallum as Mike's Dad
- Sandra McGregor as Georgie
- Stephen O'Rourke as Tim
- Grant Dodwell
- Ron Graham
- Paula Duncan
- Arna-Maria Winchester
- Vince Martin

== Filming locations ==
Film Australia’s Lindfield production offices were used to depict the fictional production company. Sydney Airport and Sydney’s North Head were also used as backdrops.
