= Frédéric Ozanam =

French scholar (1813–1853)

Blessed Antoine-Frédéric Ozanam
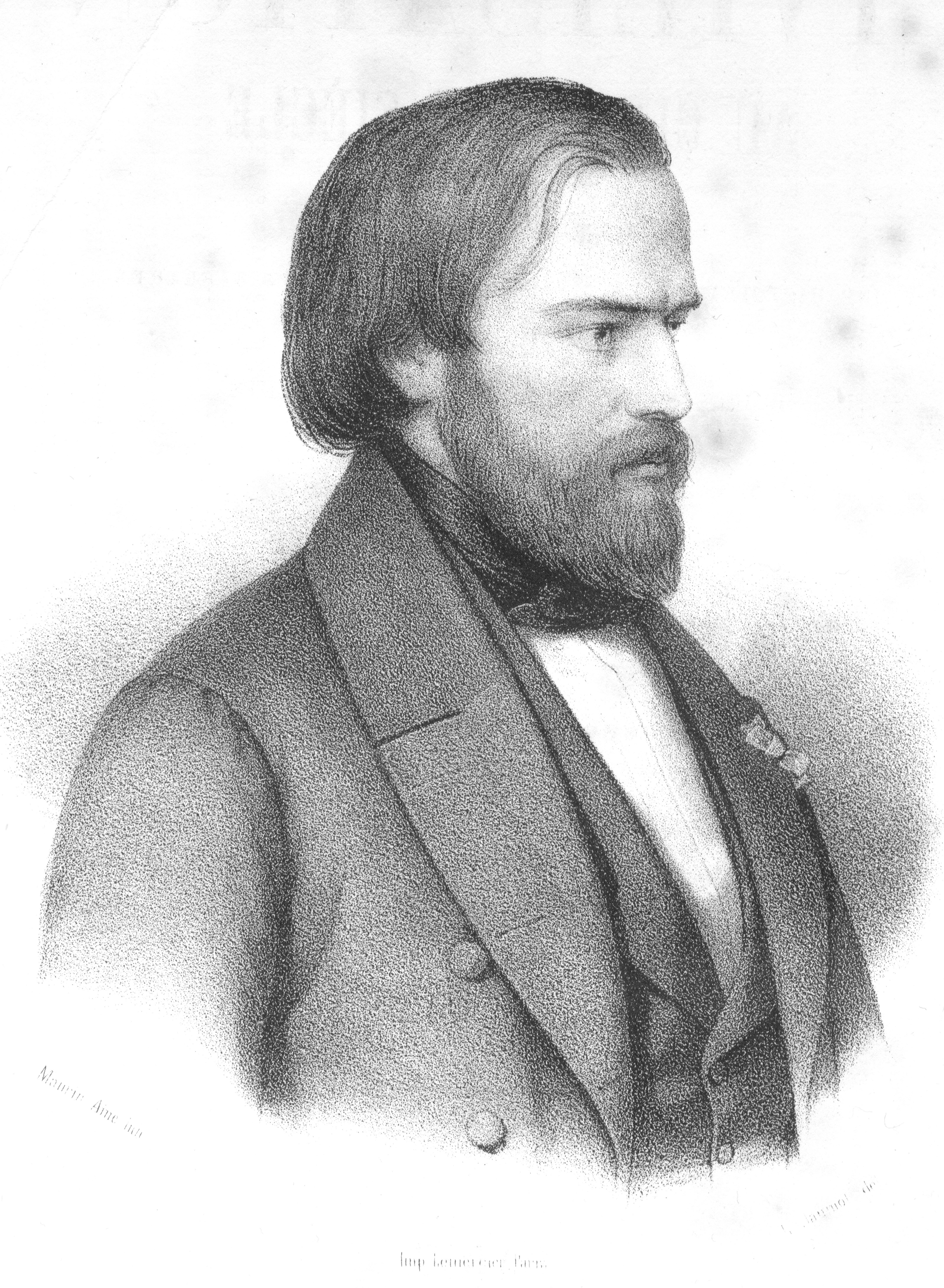
- Born: 23 April 1813; Milan, Kingdom of Italy
- Died: 8 September 1853 (aged 40); Marseille, France
- Cause of death: Tuberculosis (formerly known as consumption)
- Venerated in: Catholic Church
- Beatified: 22 August 1997, Cathedral of Notre-Dame de Paris by Pope John Paul II
- Feast: 9 September
- Patronage: The Society of Saint Vincent de Paul, Lawyers, Teachers, Literature

Antoine-Frédéric Ozanam (pronounced [ɑ̃twan fʁedeʁik ozanam]; 23 April 1813 – 8 September 1853) was a French Catholic literary scholar, lawyer, journalist and equal rights advocate. He founded with fellow students the Conference of Charity, later known as the Society of Saint Vincent de Paul. He was beatified by Pope John Paul II in the Cathedral of Notre-Dame de Paris in 1997. His feast day is 9 September.

== Biography ==
Frédéric Ozanam was born on Friday, 23 April 1813, to Jean and Marie Ozanam. He was the fifth of 14 children, one of only three to reach adulthood. His family, which had distant Jewish connections, had been settled in the region around Lyon, France, for many centuries. An ancestor of Frédéric, Jacques Ozanam (1640–1717), was a noted mathematician. Jean Ozanam, Frédéric's father, had served in the armies of the French First Republic, but with the rise to power of Napoleon Bonaparte, and the founding of the First French Empire, he turned to trade, to teaching, and finally to medicine.

Ozanam was born in Milan, but brought up in Lyon. In his youth, he experienced a period of doubt regarding the Catholic faith, during which he was strongly influenced by one of his teachers at the Collège de Lyon, the priest Joseph-Mathias Noirot (known usually as the Abbé Noirot). His religious instincts showed themselves early, and in 1831 he published Réflexions sur la Doctrine de Saint-Simon, a pamphlet against Saint-Simonianism, which attracted the attention of the French poet and politician Alphonse de Lamartine who was born in the area. Ozanam also found time to help organize and write for the Association for the Propagation of the Faith, a lay Catholic organization founded in the city with the aim of supporting Catholic missionaries, many of whom came from the area. That autumn he went to study law in Paris, where he suffered a great deal from homesickness. Ozanam fell in with the Ampère family (living for a time with the mathematician André-Marie Ampère), and through them with other prominent liberal Catholics of the time, such as Count François-René de Chateaubriand, and Charles Forbes René de Montalembert.

While still a student, Ozanam took up journalism and contributed considerably to the Tribune catholique of Bailly, which later became L'Univers, a French Catholic daily newspaper that adopted a strongly ultramontane position. Ozanam and his friends revived a discussion group called a "Society of Good Studies" and formed it into a "Conference of History" which quickly became a forum for large and lively discussions among students. Their attentions turned frequently to the social teachings of the Gospel. At one meeting during a heated debate in which Ozanam and his friends were trying to prove from historical evidence alone the truth of the Catholic Church as the one founded by Christ, their adversaries declared that, though at one time the Church was a source of good, it no longer was. One voice issued the challenge, "What is your church doing now? What is She doing for the poor of Paris? Show us your works and we will believe you!"

As a consequence, in May 1833 Ozanam and a group of other young men founded the charitable Society of Saint Vincent de Paul, which already by the time of his death numbered upwards of 2,000 members. The founding members developed their method of service under the guidance of Sister Rosalie Rendu, a member of the Congregation of Daughters of Charity of Saint Vincent de Paul, who was prominent in serving the poor in the slums of Paris. The members of the conferences collaborated with Rendu during the time of the cholera epidemic. When fear had gripped the population, she organized the conferences in all the neighborhoods of Paris to care for the cholera victims, becoming well known in the city for her work, especially in the 12th arrondissement. Frederic's first act of charity was to take his supply of winter firewood and bring it to a widow whose husband had died of cholera.

Ozanam received the degrees of Bachelor of Laws in 1834, Bachelor of Arts in 1835 and Doctor of Laws in 1836. His father, who had wanted him to study law, died on 12 May 1837. Although he preferred literature, Ozanam worked in the legal profession in order to support his mother, and was admitted to the Bar in Lyon in 1837.

In 1835, Ozanam persuaded Monseigneur de Quélen, the Archbishop of Paris, to ask Jean-Baptiste Henri Lacordaire to preach a Lenten series at the Cathedral of Notre-Dame in Paris, as part of the Notre-Dame Lectures specially aimed at the catechesis of Christian youth, which had been inaugurated at the behest of his friend Ozanam. Lacordaire's first lecture took place on 8 March 1835, and was met with wide acclaim. Lacordaire was reputed to be the greatest pulpit orator of the nineteenth century. The social event of its day, it was well-attended and became an annual tradition in Paris. According to Thomas Bokenkotter, Lacordaire's Notre Dame Conferences, "...proved to be one of the most dramatic events of nineteenth century church history."

Still, he also pursued his personal interest, and in 1839 he obtained the degree of Doctor of Letters with a thesis on Dante that then formed the basis of Ozanam's best-known books. A year later he was appointed to a professorship of commercial law at Lyon, and in 1840, at the age of twenty-seven, assistant professor of foreign literature at the Sorbonne. He decided to give a course of lectures on German Literature in the Middle Ages and in preparation for it went on a short tour of Germany. His lectures proved highly successful despite the fact that he attached fundamental importance to Christianity as the primary factor in the growth of European civilization, unlike his predecessors and most of his colleagues, who shared in the predominantly anti-Christian climate of the Sorbonne at that time.

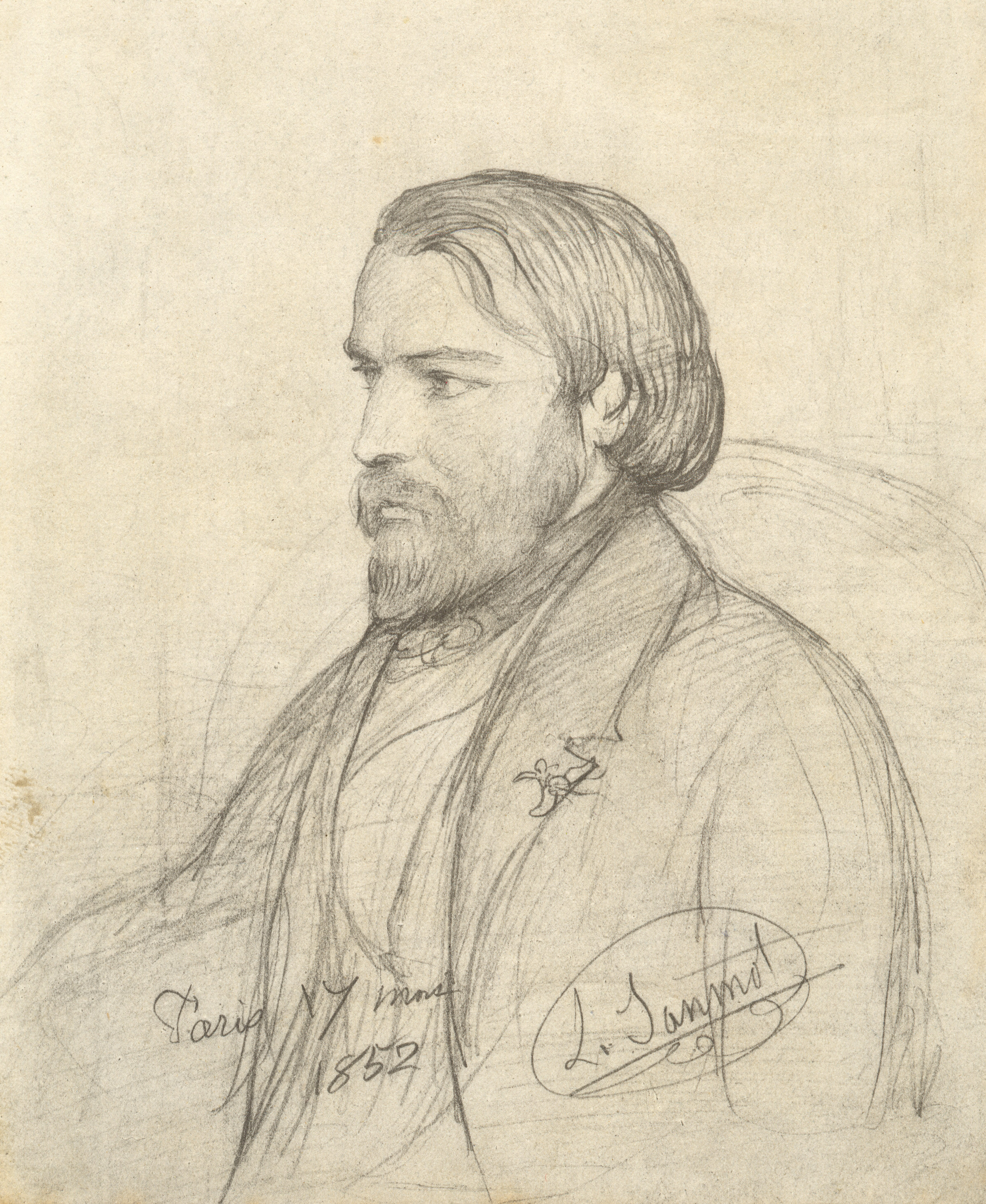
Frédéric Ozanam, 1852

In June 1841, he married Amélie Soulacroix, daughter of the rector of the University of Lyon, and the couple travelled to Italy for their honeymoon. They had a daughter, Marie.

Candelas describes Ozanam as " ... a man of great faith. He valued friendships and defended his friends no matter what the cost. He was attentive to details, perhaps to the extreme. ... [H]e showed a great tenderness when dealing with his family. ...He had a great reverence for his parents, and revealed his ability to sacrifice his career and his profession in order to please them.

Upon the death in 1844 of Claude Charles Fauriel, Ozanam succeeded to the full professorship of foreign literature at the Sorbonne. The remainder of his short life was extremely busy, attending to his duties as a professor, his extensive literary activities, and the work of district-visiting as a member of the society of St. Vincent de Paul.

During the French Revolution of 1848, of which he took a sanguine view, he once more turned journalist by writing, for a short time, in various papers, including the Ère nouvelle ("New Era"), which he had founded. He traveled extensively, and visited England at the time of the Exhibition of 1851.

=== Death ===
His naturally weak constitution fell prey to consumption, which he hoped to cure by visiting Italy, but on his return to France he died in Marseille on 8 September 1853, at the age of 40. He was buried in the crypt of the church of St. Joseph des Carmes at the Institut Catholique in Paris.

== Works ==
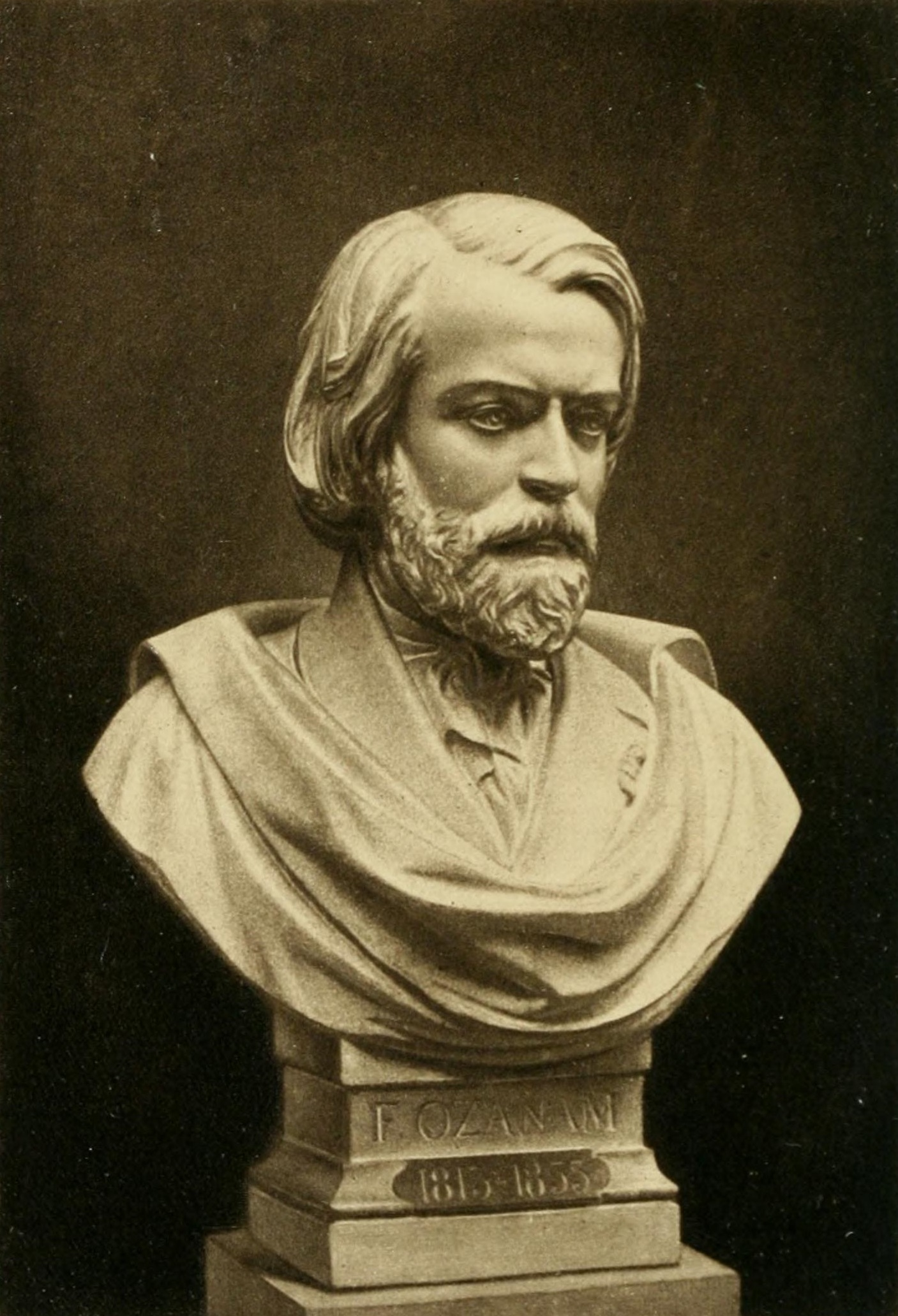
Bust of Frédéric Ozanam.

Ozanam "is recognized as a precursor of the Catholic Church's social doctrine, whose cultural and religious origins he wanted to know and on which he wrote books which are still in great demand." In contemporary movements, he was an earnest and conscientious advocate of Catholic democracy and of the view that the Church should adapt itself to the changed political conditions consequent to the French Revolution. He denounced the old alliance of "Throne and Altar" and pleaded with the Pope to adopt more liberal positions. He advocated the separation of church and state as conducive to liberty, and he was frequently impugned by reactionaries who accused him of deserting the Church.

In his writings he dwelt upon important contributions of historical Christianity, and maintained especially that, in continuing the work of the Caesars, the Catholic Church had been the most potent factor in civilizing the invading barbarians and in organizing the life of the Middle Ages. He confessed that his object was to prove the contrary thesis to Edward Gibbon, and, although the aim of proving theses is perhaps not the ideal approach for a historian, Ozanam no doubt administered a healthful antidote to the prevalent notion, particularly amongst English-speaking peoples, that the Catholic Church had done far more to enslave than to elevate the human mind. His knowledge of medieval literature and his appreciative sympathy with medieval life admirably qualified him for his work, and his scholarly attainments are still highly esteemed.

His works were published in the eleven volume Œuvres complètes, edited by Jean-Jacques Ampère (Paris, 1862–1865). They include:

- — (1836). Deux chanceliers d'Angleterre, Bacon de Verulam et Saint Thomas de Cantorbéry [Two chancellors of England: Francis Bacon and Saint Thomas Becket] (in French). Paris.
- — (1839). Dante et la philosophie catholique au XIIIeme siècle [Dante and Catholic philosophy in the 13th century] (in French). Paris. (2nd ed., enlarged 1845)
- — (1847–1849). Études germaniques [Germanic studies] (in French). Vol. 2 volumes. Paris. Translated by A. C. Glyn as History of Civilization in the Fifth Century (London, 1868)
- — (1850). Documents Inédits pour servir a l'histoire de l'Italie depuis le VIIIeme siècle jusqu'au XIIeme [Unpublished documents in the history of Italy from the 8th-12th centuries.] (in French). Paris.
- — (1852). Les Poètes franciscains en Italie au XIIIme siècle [Franciscan Poets in Italy in the 13th century] (in French). Paris.
- His letters were partly translated into English by A. Coates (London, 1886).

== Legacy ==
The following were named in his honour:

- Ozanam House, Ipswich, a heritage-listed house in Ipswich, Queensland, Australia
- Ozanam House, Sydney, a heritage-listed building in Sydney, New South Wales, Australia
- Ozanam House, Agidingbi, a heritage-listed building in Agidingbi, Lagos, Nigeria
- Ozanam Hall, Chicago, a residence hall at the Lincoln Park campus of DePaul University in Chicago, Illinois. Prior to 2020, the building was known as Clifton-Fullerton Hall. DePaul University Office of Housing
- Ozanam Inn, New Orleans, Louisiana, a shelter for the homeless.
- Ozanam Building, Adamson University, Manila, Philippines
- Ozanam Charitable Pharmacy, Inc., Mobile, Alabama, a charitable pharmacy for uninsured low income, working poor, disabled adult individuals in need of free life-sustaining medication.
- Ozanam Recovery House, Kelowna, British Columbia, Canada. Recovery home for men struggling with addiction and mental health issues. https://www.recoverykelowna.ca/

== Veneration ==
Ozanam's spiritual writings were approved by theologians on 11 November 1949. A cause for his beatification was opened, and he was given the title Servant of God. Ozanam was beatified by Pope John Paul II in 1997 during World Youth Day, 22 August.

== Sources ==
- Gérard Cholvy, Frédéric Ozanam, l'Engagement d'un Intellectuel Catholique au XIXe Siècle. Paris: Fayard, 2004. Prix Roland de Jouvenel (ISBN 2-213-61482-2).
- There are French biographies of Ozanam by his brother, C. A. Ozanam (Paris, 1882); Mme E. Humbert (Paris, 1880); C. Huit (Paris, 1882); M. de Lambel (Paris, 1887); L. Curnier (Paris, 1888); and B. Faulquier (Paris, 1903)
- German biographies by F.X. Karker (Paderborn, 1867) and E. Hardy (Mainz, 1878)
