= The Dismissal (miniseries) =

1983 Australian television miniseries

- Screenplay by: Terry Hayes; Ron Blair; Sally Gibson; George Miller; Phillip Noyce; Daphne Paris
- Story by: Ron Blair
- Directed by: Carl Schultz; George Miller; Phillip Noyce; John Power; George Ogilvie
- Starring: Max Phipps; John Stanton; John Meillon
- Country of origin: Australia
- Original language: English
- No. of episodes: 3

Production
- Producer: Terry Hayes
- Cinematography: Dean Semler
- Editors: Richard Francis-Bruce; Sara Bennett; John Hollands
- Running time: 270 minutes
- Production company: Kennedy Miller
- Budget: $2.6 million

Original release
- Network: Network Ten
- Release: 6 March – 9 March 1983

The Dismissal is an Australian television miniseries, first screened in 1983, that dramatised the events of the 1975 Australian constitutional crisis.

It was partly written and directed by the noted film makers George Miller and Phillip Noyce as well as Mad Max screenwriter Terry Hayes, with cinematography by Dean Semler.

The miniseries comprised six one-hour episodes. It was originally broadcast by Network Ten, beginning on 6 March 1983 (the day after the 1983 federal election), and was also broadcast in the United Kingdom.

It was voted the 19th-best Australian television show on the 50 Years 50 Shows list.

In the 1970s, there were several attempts to make a film based on the same story called King Hit, written by Erwin Rado and Bruce Grant. Phillip Noyce and Paul Cox were both attached as directors for a time.

== Cast ==
Main cast members

- Max Phipps as Labor Prime Minister Gough Whitlam
- John Hargreaves as Deputy Prime Minister Jim Cairns (ep. 1, also starring ep. 3)
- Bill Hunter as Rex Connor (ep. 1–2, also starring ep. 3)
- John Stanton as Liberal Prime Minister Malcolm Fraser
- Stewart Faichney as Billy Snedden (ep. 1)
- John Meillon as Governor-General Sir John Kerr
- Ed Devereaux as Phillip Lynch (ep. 1, also starring ep. 2–3)
- Peter Sumner as Treasurer Bill Hayden
- Neela Dey as Junie Morosi (ep. 1)
- Harry Weiss as Tirath Khemlani (ep. 1–2)
- Carol Burns as Cairn's Secretary (ep. 1)
- David Downer as Tony Staley (ep. 1, also starring ep. 3)
- Nancy Hayes as Connor's Secretary (ep. 1, also starring ep. 2)
- Tony Barry as Press Secretary (ep. 1)
- Robyn Nevin as Anne Kerr, Lady Kerr
- Tom Oliver as Reg Withers (ep. 1, also starring ep. 2–3)
- Tim Eliott as Sir Frederick Wheeler (ep. 1)

Also starring

- Arthur Dignam as Eric Robinson (ep. 1)
- Alan Becher as Liberal MP (ep. 1)
- Sean Scully as Doug Anthony (ep. 1, 3)
- John Allen as Prime Ministerial Aide (ep. 1–2)
- Les Foxcroft as The First Speaker (ep. 1)
- Dennis Miller as The Second Speaker (ep. 1)
- Ruth Cracknell as Margaret Whitlam
- Stuart Littlemore as TV Anchorman
- Veronica Lang as Reporter (ep. 1)
- Martin Vaughan as Albert Field (ep. 2)
- Malcolm Keith as Melbourne Reporter (ep. 2)
- George Ogilvie as Jim McClelland (ep. 2–3)
- Tom Farley as Labor Minister (ep. 2)
- Ken Wayne as Liberal Senator (ep. 2–3)
- Peter Carroll as Liberal Party Official (ep. 2)
- Mervyn Drake as Newspaper Lawyer (ep. 2)
- Peter Collingwood as Tun Abdul Razak (ep. 3)
- Robin Bowering as D.J. Killen (ep. 3)
- Tony Blackett as Robert Ellicot (ep. 3)
- Tim Burns as David Smith (ep. 3)
- Ray Marshall as Labor Senator Leader (ep. 3)
- Martin Harris as Kep Enderby (ep. 3)

== Reception ==
The series was a huge ratings success in Australia, getting a 42% viewing share.

== See also ==
- The Dismissal (musical)
