= Matthew Talbot Hostel =

Support service for homeless men in Sydney

Coordinates: 33.873591°S 151.218897°E

Matthew Talbot Hostel is a shelter and support service provider for homeless men, operating since 1938, in central Sydney, Australia. It is located at 22 Talbot Place, Woolloomooloo, Sydney, New South Wales, Australia.

== History ==
The Matthew Talbot Hostel was founded by the St Vincent de Paul Society in 1938 and started its mission with 11 beds and 100 meals a day.

It was dedicated, as a hostel for "friendless" men, on 25 October 1938 by Coadjutor Archbishop of Sydney, Norman Gilroy. It was named after Dublin dockworker and reformed alcoholic, Matt Talbot.

By 1944 the hostel was providing 1,600 free meals a week.

The hostel was first located at the St. John's Church building on Kent Street.

It transferred from its original Kent Street location to Ozanam House in Young Street in December 1952.

== Mission ==
The hostel helps men over the age of 21 who are homeless or at risk of homelessness. The employees are trained in several disciplines. In time of crisis they offer to help and support the affected people. The guests receive meals (the hostel serves around 620 hot meals each day), access to sanitary facilities, clothing, and basic medical. Furthermore, the hostel offers a case management, legal and housing support, as well as advocacy and special care for people with sleeping rough and trauma. Each year more than 35,000 men benefit from the hostel.

Complementarily, the Ozanam Learning Centre offers diverse programs for men and women over 18 during the day.

== The Hostel ==
Altogether, the hostel holds 98 beds.

It also has room and space for further occupations. The hostel has an art space for creatively gifted persons and a gym to convey community-building values. In the computer room, useful skills are taught to facilitate re-entry into society. In the barbershop, people are helped to restore their appearance. The kitchen is used as a place to learn more about cooking and nutrition.
