= Malmsbury Youth Justice Centre =

Coordinates: 37.188°S 144.397°E

- Interactive map of Malmsbury Youth Justice Centre
- Location: Australia
- Status: Operational
- Opened: 1965
- Closed: 2024
- Managed by: Department of Justice and Community Safety

Malmsbury Youth Justice Centre is a correctional facility for young male offenders in Malmsbury, Victoria, Australia.

== History ==
Malmsbury Youth Justice Centre opened in 1965. Purpose built to house young men in the custody of the Victoria corrections system, Malsbury faced many challenges related to its management and offender behaviour. Malmsbury became known for serious incidents, including riots, violence, and escape attempts.

In June 2023, the Victorian state government announced its decision to close Malmsbury by the end of that year. All offenders were relocated to Melbourne Youth Justice Centre and the newly builty Cherry Creek Youth Justice Centre. Approximately 240 staff were offered financial incentives to remain at Malmsbury until its closure. The decision was criticised, both because it was announced by accident to some staff via email, and also because Malmsbury had only three years early been upgraded at significant cost.

In October 2025 it was announced that the centre would be reopened from April 2026, with 30 beds will be opened for lower-risk cohort aged 17 years and over as part of a new rehabilitation model, at a cost of $151 million over five years.

== Incidents and controversy ==
=== August 2022 escape ===
In August 2024, two offenders escaped from Malmsbury by breaking through the roof of the admissions unit. The escape occurred amid significant staff shortages. Reports indicated the centre had not met its staffing requirements for several nights before and after the escape. Malmsbury staff had also reported anxiety and pressure due to the shortages. In response to the escape, the Victorian state government permanently closed the affected unit. The two offenders were both located and returned to custody two days later.

=== September 2022 violence ===
On 20 September 2022, violence at Malmsbury left several staff member injured, including two with serious head wounds. The violence occurred in a high-security unit.

=== October 2023 riot ===
In October 2023, a violent riot at Malmsbury resulted in thirteen offenders facing charges. Unrest lead to the hospitalisation of two offenders and some were alleged to have produce child abuse material and attempted to escape. Court documents revealed some offenders sexually assaulted children with this being filmed. Offenders were also alleged to have stolen security passes, taken hostages, and committed serious assault. One offender was injured so badly in the violence they were unidentifiable.

=== Use as the set of a film ===
Six weeks after the October 2023 riot, a film crew shot scenes for the 2024 prison drama film Inside starring Guy Pearce on location at Malmsbury. The Victorian state government stated the filming did not disrupt operations and took place in unoccupied units. However, Malsbury staff reported the filming did affect offenders, who as a result of the film crew being on site were relocated and restricted from accessing sections of the centre. Staff reported frustration and felt the filming exacerbated the trauma experienced by both offenders and staff following the recent unrest.
