= Amélie Soulacroix =

French philanthropist

Marie-Josephine-Amélie Soulacroix (August 14, 1820 in Marseille – September 26, 1894 in Écully), was a French philanthropist and charity worker. Daughter of a rector of the Académie of Lyon, on June 23, 1841, she married the lawyer, littérateur and philanthropist Antoine Frédéric Ozanam in the church of Saint-Nizier in Lyon. The marriage was a very happy one and there was one child, Marie, born in 1845.

Ozanam's naturally weak constitution fell a prey to consumption, which he tried to cure by visiting Italy, where he had been born, but on the sea voyage back to France his condition worsened and he died at Marseille on September 8, 1853. He was beatified by Pope John Paul II in the cathedral church Notre Dame de Paris in 1997.

Only 32 at the time of her husband's death, Amélie never remarried and was long to outlive him. She died after a short illness at the family home at Écully, a town to the west of Lyon, on September 26, 1894 and her funeral took place at the parish church there.

In the intervening years she was to emerge as a strong figure in her own right, actively supporting many good causes, including the missionary work of Cardinal Charles Lavigerie and the Oeuvre du Bon-Pasteur.
