= 420 Kent Street =

Former church in Sydney, Australia

- Former Church Including Interior and Front Fence
- St John the Evangelist Church
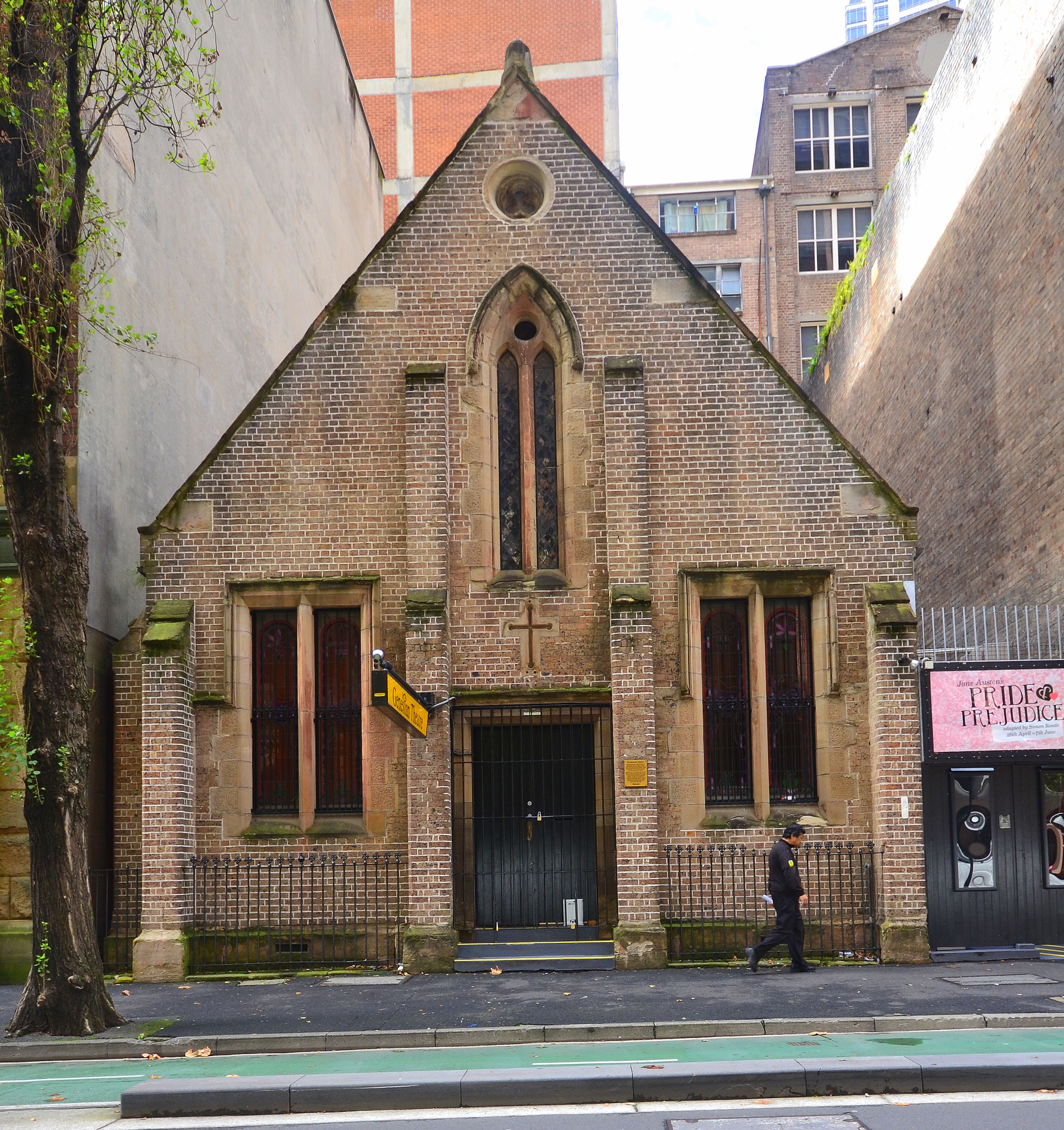
- The former church at 420 Kent Street, Sydney
- 420 Kent Street
- Address: 420 Kent Street
- Country: New South Wales, Australia
- Previous denomination: Catholic
- Sui iuris church: Roman Catholic Church

History
- Former name: Genesian Theatre
- Founded: 4 October 1868
- Founder: John McEncroe
- Dedication: Saint John

Architecture
- Functional status: Preserved
- Heritage designation: Local Environmental Plan
- Designated: 14 December 2012
- Architect: William Munro
- Style: Victorian Free Gothic
- Years built: 1868
- Completed: 1868
- Construction cost: £900
- Closed: 1883

Administration
- Archdiocese: Archdiocese of Sydney

420 Kent Street (also known as St John the Evangelist Church) is a heritage-listed former church in Sydney, New South Wales, Australia that was in use from 1868 until 1932. The building has been the home of a church school, a poor school, the Kursaal Theatre, the Matthew Talbot Hostel, the Genesian Theatre Company and most recently (as of 2026) the Divine Playhouse.

== History and description ==
420 Kent Street is a locally heritage-listed church that was built in 1868 in a simplified Victorian Free Gothic style. The land was acquired in 1856 by John McEncroe and was held in a trust for the Roman Catholic Church until February 1868 when the trustees decided to build a new church. The building was first used by the Roman Catholic Church, then as a church school between 1868 until 1883, then as a poor school from c.1905 until 1927, it was then used as the home of the Kursaal Theatre directed by Scott Alexander from 1932 to 1938, the building was then used by St Vincent de Paul Society as a refuge for destitute men, known as the Matthew Talbot Hostel until 1952. Following those uses, the building became home to the Genesian Theatre Company and in 2026, the Divine Playhouse. The building cost £900 to build and the architect was William Munro.

== Genesian Theatre Company ==
The Genesian Theatre Company produces multiple main stage productions each year as well as running classes, workshops, and many other activities. The Genesian Theatre Company was named in honour of Saint Genesius, patron saint of actors. It was formed in 1944 by members of the Sydney Catholic Youth Organisation and was first based at Legion House, Castlereagh Street.

Alumni of the company include John Bell, Bryan Brown, Baz Luhrmann, Coral Lansbury, Judi Farr, Nick Enright, Angela Punch Peter Carroll.

Membership is open to any members of the community that are over the age of 18. Members are invited to participate in all aspects of theatre production, including acting, designing, back-stage work, directing and administration.

In September 2017, the Catholic Church advised the Genesian Theatre Company that they had sold the building to a developer for over $6 million and that the company would be required to vacate by November 2018. The company later negotiated with the new owner of the building to remain at Kent Street until 2020. The company announced a further year at Kent Street in October 2019, with a likely move from the building to a new venue in 2021.

The theatre company reopened at a hall at St Joseph's Church in Rozelle in early 2025, following renovations.

== Divine Playhouse ==
In 2026 the Genesian Theatre building in Kent Street was re-purposed as a performance and creative arts space fused with a nightclub known as the Unholy Playhouse.

In July 2026, the former Genesian Theatre building was called out by the Christian community after it reopened as Divine Playhouse, an LGBTQ+-friendly arts and performance venue operated by Heaps Gay Events. The venue, originally promoted as the Unholy Playhouse, changed its name to the Divine Playhouse following concerns from members of the Christian community. The venue's opening night drew protests from Christian groups, which alleged that performances and religious imagery used at the event mocked Christianity.

Following the protests, the building's landlord, Revelop, issued Heaps Gay Events with a breach notice alleging that the venue had engaged in "offensive trade" under an 1842 law and ordered it to cease activities or face possible termination of its lease. The organisers subsequently closed the venue and cancelled planned events while considering legal action. The controversy also prompted calls for the Government of New South Wales to withdraw a $100,000 grant awarded to the venue by Create NSW. Organisers maintained that causing offence had not been their intention and defended artistic freedom, while supporters of the venue raised concerns about the impact of the dispute on LGBTQ+ and independent arts spaces.

A war of words ensued with "radio shock jocks" following the ejection from the venue. Cate Faehrmann, a New South Wales Greens MP, told the Australian Associated Press that Chris Minns' comments set "a very dangerous precedent". The NSW Minister for the Arts John Graham stated the eviction was "a step backwards for Sydney".

On July 25, over 2000 people gathered in a peaceful counter-protest 4 days after the lease was terminated. The crowd sang in solidarity to protest the closure of the Divine Playhouse. Hyde Park was "transformed into a sea of colour and celebration as peaceful protestors unleashed their queer joy as a sign of unity". Etcetera Etcetera, alumni of Drag Race Down Under and performer at the Divine Playhouse, said at the protest the case resonated with the Vatican's attempt to "shut down Madonna" 30 years prior (after the 2016 release of Like a Prayer). Benjamin Law (writer) also spoke at the protest. Victoria Falconer, a cabaret artist, led the crowd to sing Madonna's Like a Prayer (song) and Chappell Roan's Pink Pony Club, along with other songs.
