= The Dismissal (musical) =

- An Extremely Serious Musical Comedy
- Music: Laura Murphy
- Lyrics: Laura Murphy
- Book: Blake Erickson; Jay James-Moody
- Basis: 1975 Australian constitutional crisis
- Premiere: 31 August 2023: York Theatre, Seymour Centre, Sydney

The Dismissal is a musical with book by Blake Erickson and Jay James-Moody, and music and lyrics by Laura Murphy. Dubbed "an extremely serious musical comedy", it is a satirical depiction of the 1975 Australian constitutional crisis.

The Dismissal had a work-in-progress presentation at the Seymour Centre in 2019. It was scheduled to premiere as a Sydney Theatre Company and Squabbalogic co-production, performing at the Canberra Theatre from 9–24 October 2021 and the Sydney Opera House Drama Theatre from 29 October to 18 December 2021. However, the production was cancelled in August 2021 due to COVID-19 restrictions.

Subsequently, as a Squabbalogic production, the musical premiered at the York Theatre, Seymour Centre from 31 August 2023 to generally positive reviews. It ran until 21 October 2023.

At the 57th AWGIE Awards, The Dismissal's book and lyrics received the Award for Music Theatre and the David Williamson Prize for Excellence in Writing for Australian Theatre.

== Musical numbers ==
Act I

- "God Save Gough" – Norman Gunston and company
- "Maintain Your Rage" – Gough Whitlam and company
- "March of Time" – Company
- "Rain Down Under" – Gough, Margaret Whitlam, Rex Connor, Dr. Jim Cairns and Company
- "Barwick's Proposal" – Garfield Barwick and Sir John Kerr
- "High Interest" – Tirath Khemlani, Rex, Jim and Showgirls
- "Barwick Proposes Again" – Garfield †
- "Where I Came From" – Sir John and company
- "Private School Boys" – Malcolm Fraser and Liberal MPs
- "Headline" – Junie Morosi
- "The House Doesn't Always Win" – Gough, Malcolm and MPs †

Act II

- "Why Would You Get Into Politics" – Norman
- "Crash Through or Crash" – Margaret, Gough and MPs
- "Private School Boys (Reprise)" – Anne Kerr and Malcolm
- "I'm Not Listening" – Queen Elizabeth II
- "Barwick Proposes Again… Again!" – Garfield †
- "Bigger Picture" – Company
- "Maintain Your Rage (Reprise)" – Company †
- "More Than This" – Sir John, Gough and Malcolm
- "Reign Down Under" – Norman and Company

† Not included on the original cast recording

== Principal cast ==
Role	Performer
Sir John Kerr	Octavia Barron Martin
Rex Connor	Georgie Bolton
Garfield Barwick	Peter Carroll
Malcolm Fraser	Andrew Cutcliffe
Dr. Jim Cairns	Joe Kosky
Junie Morosi	Shannen Alyce Quan
Margaret Whitlam	Brittanie Shipway
Gough Whitlam	Justin Smith
Anne Kerr	Stacey Thomsett
Norman Gunston	Matthew Whittet

== See also ==
- The Dismissal (miniseries)
- Keating!
