= The Christian Brothers =

Play by Ron Blair

- Original language: English
- Written by: Ron Blair

Premiere
- Date: 1 August 1975
- Place: Nimrod Theatre, Sydney

The Christian Brothers is a play by Australian writer Ron Blair first performed in 1975. It is a one-man play about a teacher at a Christian Brothers school. It was based on Blair's experience of studying at the Christian Brothers school in Lewisham, Sydney and has come to be regarded as an Australian classic. Peter Carroll performed in the original Nimrod Theatre production, which was directed by John Bell and designed by Larry Eastwood. The play has been revived a number of times, including the 1991 production at the Q Theatre, Penrith with Neil Fitzpatrick, directed by Helmut Bakaitis.
