= All These Creatures =

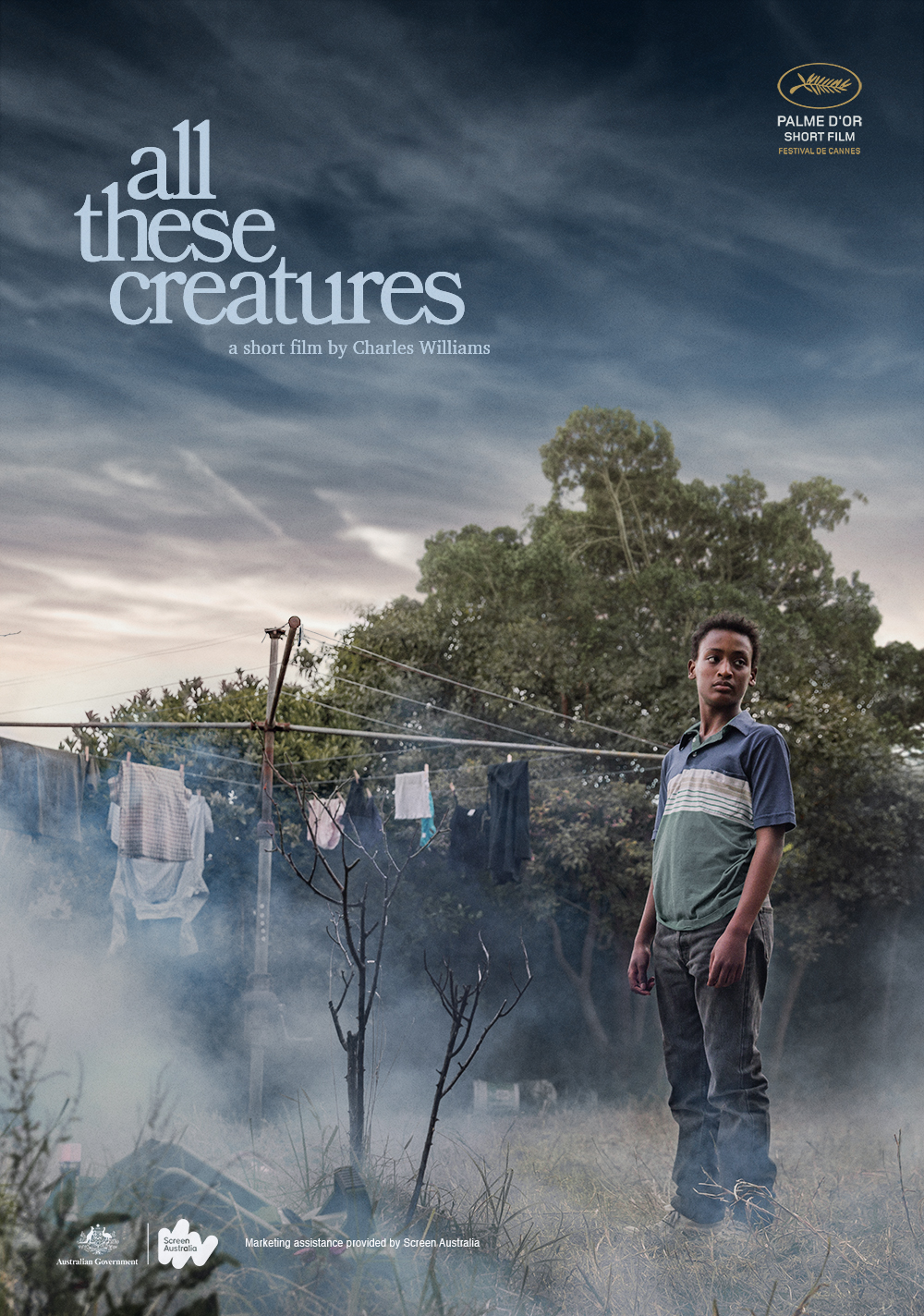
- Directed by: Charles Williams
- Written by: Charles Williams
- Produced by: Charles Williams; Elise Trenorden
- Starring: Yared Scott; Mandela Mathia
- Narrated by: Melchisedek Nkailu
- Cinematography: Adric Watson
- Edited by: Dan Lee; Charles Williams
- Music by: Chiara Costanza
- Production company: Simpatico Films
- Release date: 18 May 2018 (Cannes Film Festival)
- Running time: 13 minutes
- Country: Australia

All These Creatures is an Australian live-action short film written and directed by Charles Williams. It was awarded the Short Film Palme d'Or at the 2018 Cannes Film Festival.

The film was shot in Dandenong in Victoria, Australia on 16mm film.

== Plot ==
An adolescent boy attempts to untangle his memories of a mysterious infestation, the unraveling of his father, and the little creatures inside us all.

== Cast ==
- Yared Scott as Tempest
- Mandela Mathia as Mal

== Reception ==
The film was awarded the Short Film Palme d'Or at the 2018 Cannes Film Festival. It later went on to make its North American Premiere at the 2018 Toronto International Film Festival. and win more than 50 other international awards including Australian Academy of Cinema and Television Arts Best Short Film.

Catherine Bray at Sight & Sound reviewed the film as one of the best of Cannes, stating that "What sets Williams’s piece apart is a sense of wonder in the smallest details". Vulture Hound gave All These Creatures five stars out of five describing it as "utterly beautiful" and Nouse described it as "One of the most important short films of the year"
