= Ron Blair (writer) =

Australian writer

- Born: 1942 (age 83–84); Sydney, Australia
- Occupations: Writer; adaptor; announcer; dramaturg; playwright
- Known for: Establishment of the Nimrod Theatre (1970); Assistant Director of the South Australian Theatre Company (1976–1978)

Ron Blair (born 1942) is an Australian writer, adaptor, announcer, dramaturg, and playwright. Among his best known works is the play The Christian Brothers. He helped establish the now defunct Nimrod Theatre in Sydney in 1970. He was also the Assistant Director of the South Australian Theatre Company from 1976 until 1978.

== Biography ==
Born in Sydney in 1942, Blair attended Christian Brothers' High School, Lewisham. While studying for a bachelor of arts at the University of Sydney, he was involved in student performances by the Sydney University Dramatic Society. Early in his career he worked for ABC Radio. A freelance writer, he has written over a dozen plays. He is married to actress and director Jennifer Hagan.

== Select credits ==
- Flash Jim Vaux (1971) (musical theatre) – writer
- President Wilson in Paris (1973) (play) – writer
- The Christian Brothers (1975) (play) – writer
- Mad, Bad and Dangerous to Know (1976) (monodrama) – writer
- Last Day in Woolloomooloo (1979) (play) – writer
- Marx (1982) (play) – writer
- The Dismissal (1983) (mini series) – writer
