= Hinchcliff House =

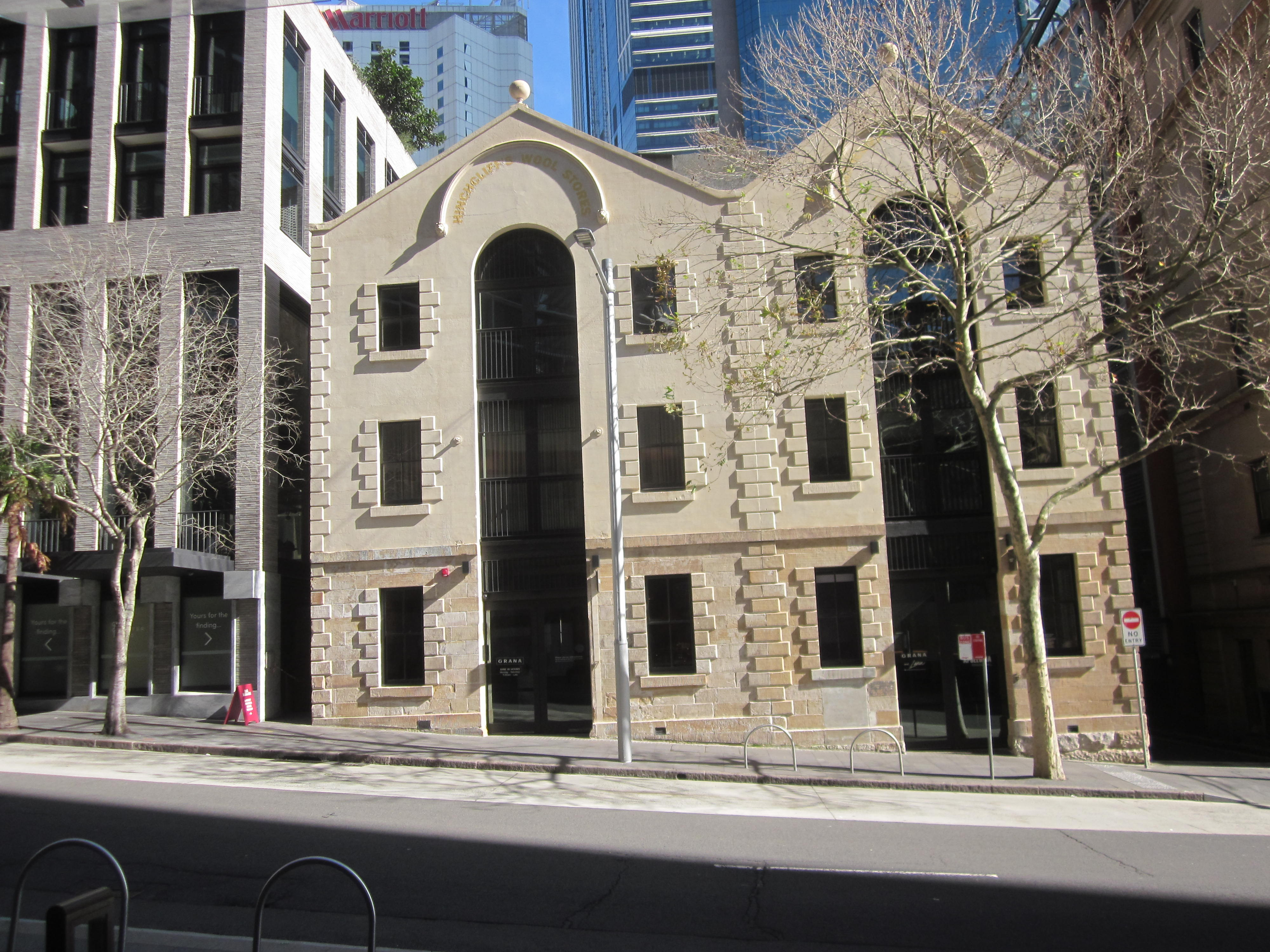
- Hinchcliff House, 5-7 Young Street, Sydney, New South Wales, after restoration in 2022

- Location within Sydney Location within Australia
- 33.8625°S 151.2109°E
- Location: 5–7 Young Street, Sydney, City of Sydney, New South Wales, Australia

History
- Built: 1860

Site notes
- Architect: Original Architect: unknown. Restoration Architect: Carter Williamson Architects
- Owner: AMP Capital

New South Wales Heritage Register
- Official name: Ozanam House; Hinchcliff's Woolstore; E F House & Marist Chapel
- Type: state heritage (built)
- Designated: 2 April 1999
- Reference no.: 701
- Type: Warehouse/storage area
- Category: Commercial

Hinchcliff House is a heritage-listed former wool store, hostel for homeless men and university campus at 5–7 Young Street, in the Central Business District of Sydney, New South Wales, Australia. The southern section was built c. 1860, while the northern section was built in the 1880s. It is also known as Hinchcliff's Woolstore, Ozanam House and EF House. It was added to the New South Wales State Heritage Register on 2 April 1999.

== History ==
Andrew Hinchcliff, who developed a reputation as one of the best judges of wool in the colony, erected an iron shed in Young Street, at the corner of Custom House Lane, in 1845, and by about 1860 the firm of A Hinchcliff, Son & Co had built a stone wool store next door. In the late 1880s the iron shed was replaced by a building matching the stone store and erected against its north wall. These are the two connected components that survive today. The Bank of New South Wales, as mortgagor, leased the property in 1937 to German woolbuyers. A mortgagee sale in 1945 saw the property acquired by the Roman Catholic Archdiocese of Sydney.

In 1949 it passed to the Society of St Vincent de Paul and was named Ozanam House in acknowledgment of the founder of the Society, Frédéric Ozanam. In 1952 part of the building was used as the Matthew Talbot Hostel for Homeless Men. It included dormitories, a bookshop and soup kitchen on the ground floor, and barber's shop, and laundry in the basement. With the departure of the hostel to larger premises, a new chapel was created on the ground floor of the 1880s structure in 1966. Today it is the only part of the building recalling 40 years of the Society of St Vincent de Paul's occupancy. The property was sold in 1988 to the AMP Society. It was occupied by the EF International School from 1992, and was then the Sydney campus of Southern Cross University, both of which subsequently relocated to other locations.

The building is presently being converted to a retail and dining venue as part of the Loftus Lane redevelopment, itself part of the broader Quay Quarter development.

== Heritage listing ==
Hinchcliff House, formerly Hinchcliff Wool Stores, 5–7 Young Street, is one of only two known examples of its building type left in Sydney. (The other is the building now called Gallipoli House, in Loftus Street, whose appearance has been much compromised.) It has historic significance, evoking a bustling period in Sydney's history, when Circular Quay was the centre of the international shipping trade, and wool was Australia's chief export. It demonstrates the form and quality of the woolstore type that preceded the entrepreneurial display of wool in larger south-lit buildings. The building is a handsome element in the streetscape and an intrinsically interesting architectural composition. The remaining timber internal structure, cathead beam structures, and a large hoist pulley characterising the manual lifting of wool to the upper floors, provide the building additional scientific significance.

Ozanam House was listed on the New South Wales State Heritage Register on 2 April 1999 having satisfied the following criteria.

The place is important in demonstrating the course, or pattern, of cultural or natural history in New South Wales.

This building represents a distinctive period when Circular Quay was the centre of the international shipping trade, and wool was Australia's chief export. Its form and quality typify the kind of woolstore, now very uncommon, that was built merely to store wool as opposed to later woolstores with saw tooth southlight roofs which were built to display the wool as well. It is historically important for its association with the St Vincent de Paul Society which occupied the building for forty years, including its use as a hostel in the 1950s. Has historic significance at a State level.

The place is important in demonstrating aesthetic characteristics and/or a high degree of creative or technical achievement in New South Wales.

The interior structure of heavy timber posts, girders seated on stone bolsters, joists and timber flooring is typical of the pre-southlight type of warehouse constructed later in the century. The roof trusses, formed of dressed timber members with common rafters underlaid by boarding to form an attractive ceiling, are unusual. The cathead beam structures and large hoist pulley that characterise the manual lifting of wool to the upper floors are significant. The many loading doorways must have facilitated rapid handling of the wool. Has aesthetic significance at a State level.

The place has a strong or special association with a particular community or cultural group in New South Wales for social, cultural or spiritual reasons.

Intrinsically attractive, this building is an intact and small composition. Its facade, which addresses three streets, makes an important contribution to the streetscape of Circular Quay. It is also an interesting example of matching designs used in two periods of construction and for its evidence of several campaigns of adaptive re-use. It has aesthetic significance as a representative of the older gable roofed warehouse style, the function of which can still be interpreted.

The place possesses uncommon, rare or endangered aspects of the cultural or natural history of New South Wales.

It is now a rare example of a building type that preceded the period when wool was displayed and sold to agents locally.

== Redevelopment ==
Hinchcliff House is part of the $1 billion urban renewal project, Quay Quarter, by AMP Capital.

According to the Architects, Carter Williamson Architects, "The building will be restored and reinterpreted for retail use, drawing on past, present and future stories of the city area and the wool store itself. Entering a hidden, basement bar via a former fire door to Loftus Lane will provide an intimate venue for tourists and locals alike".

Hinchcliff House, Quay Quarter Sydney’s anchor venue, located in Circular Quay, has officially opened its doors in 2021 as home to four exciting new eating and drinking concepts from the team at House Made Hospitality. It will feature all day dining hub Grana on the ground floor, lively restaurant Lana on the first floor, Sicilian bandits’ drinking den, Apollonia in the basement and Hinchcliff Events on the top floor.
