= Charles Williams (film director) =

Australian filmmaker

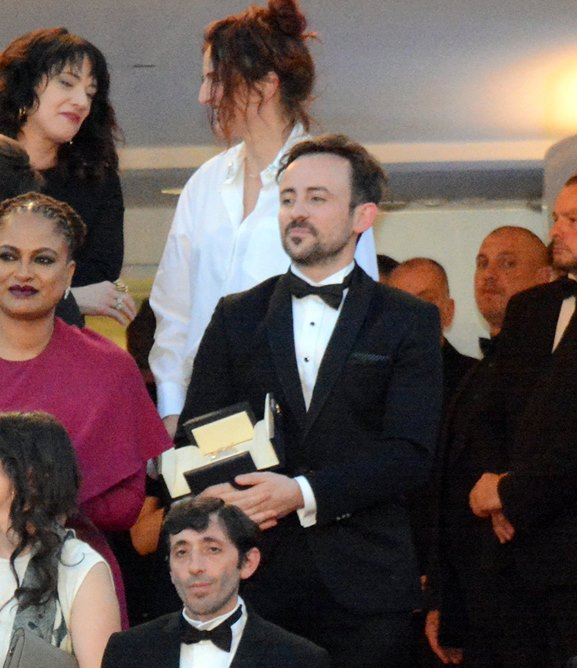
- Born: Melbourne, Victoria, Australia
- Occupations: Film director, producer, screenwriter
- Website: charleswilliams.com.au

Charles Williams is an Australian film director and screenwriter. He is best known for his 2018 short film All These Creatures (2018), which won the Short Film Palme d'Or at the 2018 Cannes Film Festival, and his acclaimed feature film debut Inside starring Guy Pearce and Cosmo Jarvis.

== Life and career ==
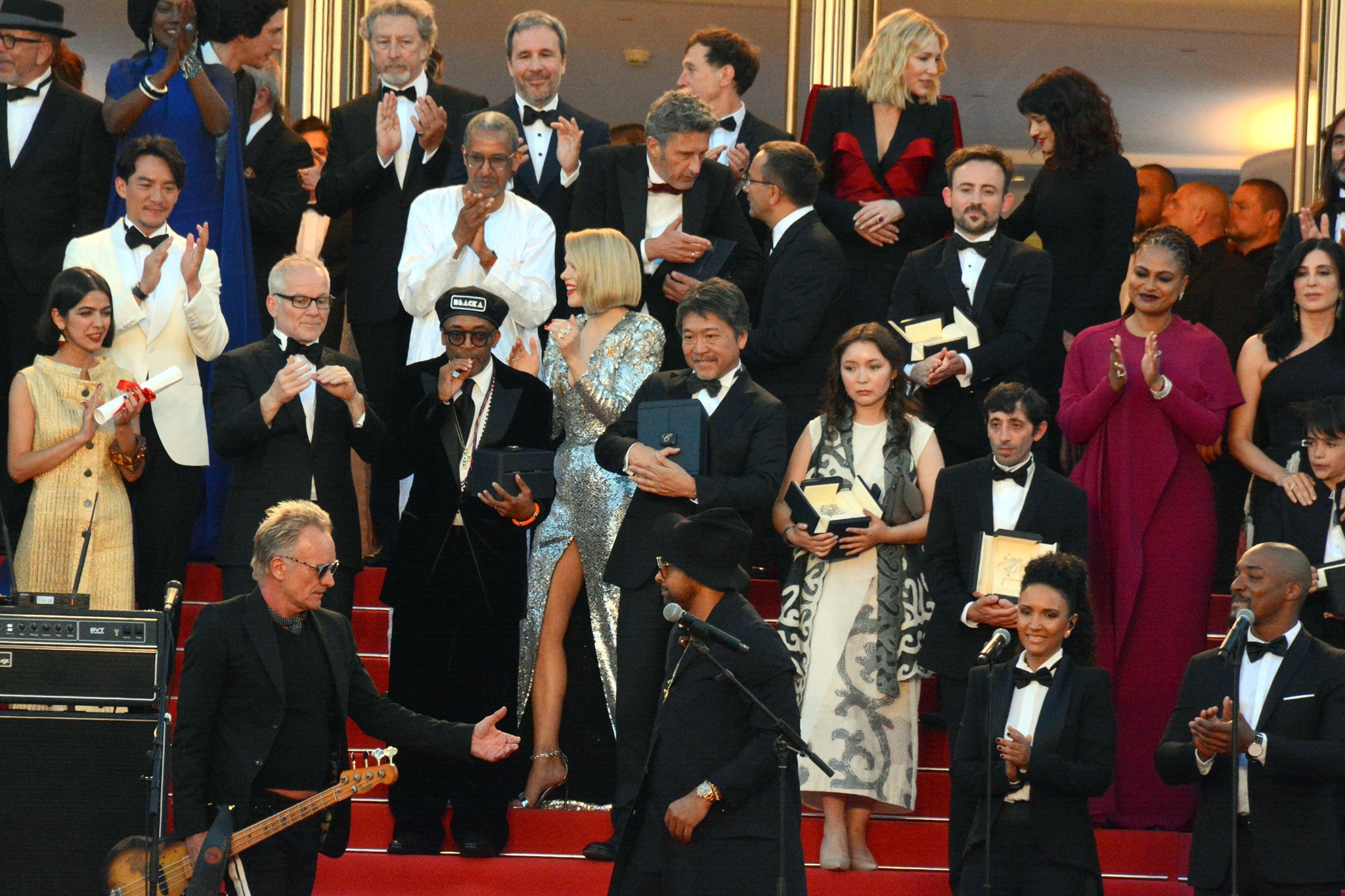
Cannes 2018 38

Williams grew up in country Victoria. At the age of 19, he made his first short film I Can’t Get Started, which won the Best Director award at Tropfest Film Festival. He went on to write and direct short films The Cow Thief, Home and All These Creatures which screened at over 180 international film festivals and went on to win more than 60 international awards including the Australian Academy of Cinema and Television Arts Award for Best Short Film.

In 2023, he wrote, directed and co-produced Inside starring Guy Pearce, Cosmo Jarvis, Vincent Miller, Tammy Macintosh and Toby Wallace.

The film was theatrically released in 2025 to critical acclaim, winning Best Film, Best Lead Actor, Best Screenplay and Best Director at the Film Critics Circle of Australia Awards as well as Best Original Feature Film Screenplay at the 2025 Australian Writers' Guild Awards.

The film made its North American premiere at the 2025 Tribeca Festival followed by a US Theatrical release on June 20.

== Filmography ==
=== Feature films ===
Year	Film	Role	Ref.
2024	Inside	Director, Writer, Producer	

=== Short film ===
Year	Film	Role	Ref.
2002	I Can't Get Started	Director, Writer, Producer, Executive Producer	
2003	Ain't Got No Jazz	Producer, Editor	
2006	The Cow Thief	Director, Writer, Producer	
2010	There Had Better Be Blood	Director, Writer, Producer	
2015	Happy with Bear	Producer	
2015	Home	Director, Producer, Editor	
2016	Homebodies	Producer	
2018	All These Creatures	Director, Writer, Producer	
