= Ozanam House, Ipswich =

Ozanam House
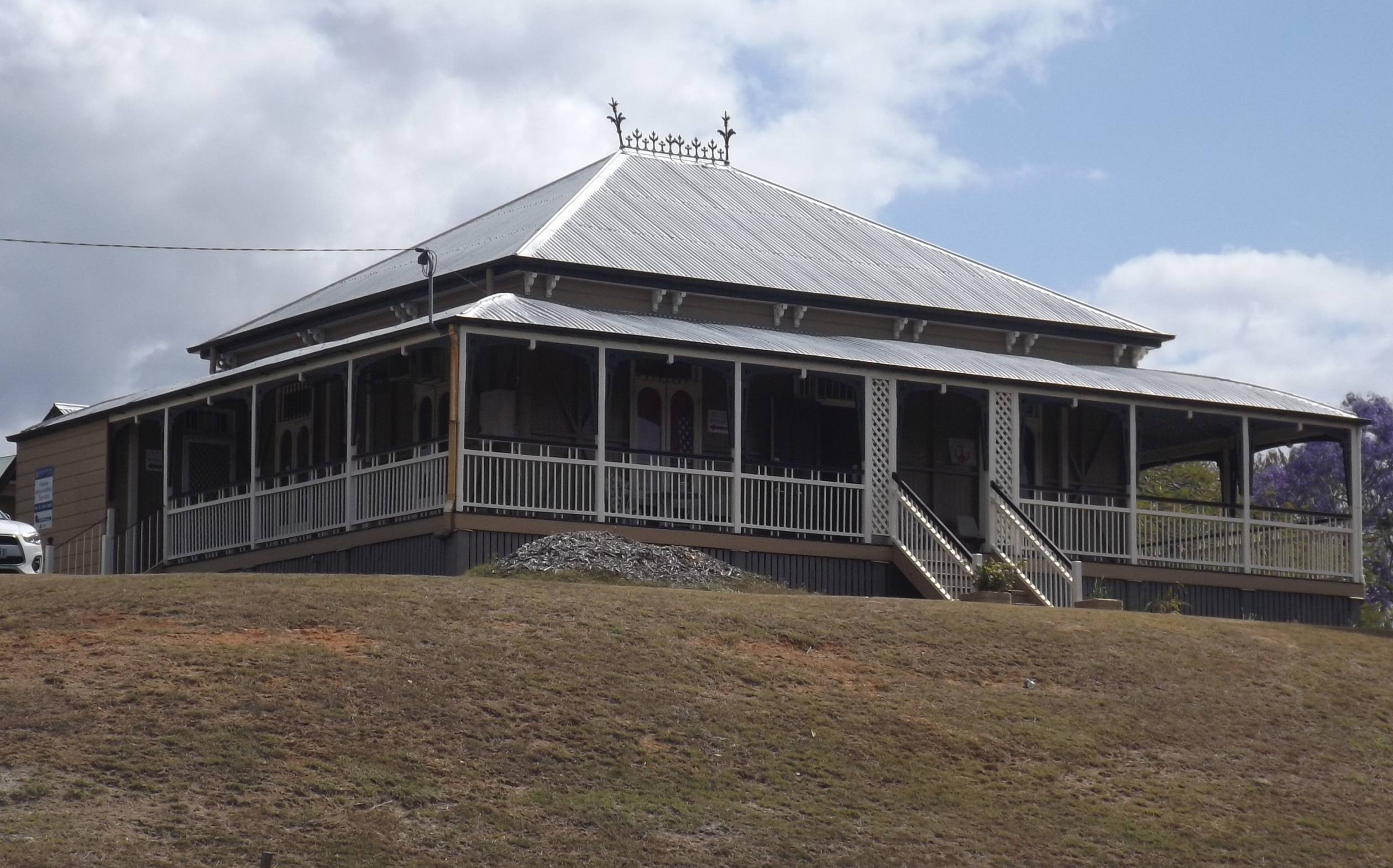
- Building in 2015

- Location within Queensland Location within Australia
- 27.6166°S 152.7534°E
- Location: 66 Roderick Street, Ipswich, City of Ipswich, Queensland, Australia

History
- Design period: 1870s–1890s (late 19th century)
- Built: c. 1886–1930s circa

Queensland Heritage Register
- Official name: Ozanam House
- Type: state heritage (landscape, built)
- Designated: 21 October 1992
- Reference no.: 600598
- Significant period: 1880s, 1930s circa (fabric); 1960s– (historical/social)
- Significant components: residential accommodation – main house, gate – entrance, embankment – road, kitchen/kitchen house, garage, pathway/walkway, steps/stairway, trees/plantings, garden edging/balustrades/planter boxes

Ozanam House is a heritage-listed detached house at 66 Roderick Street, Ipswich, City of Ipswich, Queensland, Australia. It was built from c. 1886 to 1930s circa. It was added to the Queensland Heritage Register on 21 October 1992.

== History ==
The majority of the land on which Ozanam House stands, originally allots 1 and 2 of Sec 83, was alienated from the crown by James Stirling in November 1879. The land transferred to William Berry in 1884 and then to Richard Davies Graham (1833–1918) in 1885.

The date of construction of the building is most likely c.1886, as RD Graham took out two mortgages on the property for £500 and £2000 in June 1886, and he is listed in the Queensland Post Office Directories as having a private practice in Ipswich in 1887 and a private residence in Ipswich in 1888. It is likely that Ozanam House was designed by RD Graham who practised as an architect, civil engineer, licensed surveyor, agent and auctioneer with his firm RD Graham and Son from 1883–87, and whose principal office was located in various addresses in Queen Street, Brisbane. The Ipswich office of the firm is only listed for 1887, and by 1889 Richard Davies Graham is listed as living in Albion and was declared insolvent in 1896.

The property transferred to Samuel Piper in 1892, and then to John Canty, a blacksmith, in 1906. Piper had mortgaged the property for £350 in 1905, and it is possible that the alterations to the front verandah occurred at this time. On the death of John Canty in 1946, the property transferred to Ethel May Senior. The land was subdivided in 1950 with Senior retaining the rear portion, and the Roderick Street frontage containing the house was transferred to Thomas Keith Johnson.

In 1960, the Metropolitan Central Council of Brisbane of the Society of St Vincent de Paul became the owner of the house, and in 1961 took possession of the rear portion of the land. An adjoining allotment fronting Omar Street was alienated from the crown in 1966. The name of the organisation was changed to the Society of Saint Vincent de Paul State Council of Queensland and the land was amalgamated and a new Certificate of Title issued in 1983.

The Society has used the house as a venue for meetings and conferences, and for the storage and preparation of food. The Society named the property Ozanam House, after the founder of the Society Frederic Ozanam. A timber shed was moved onto the rear of the site in the early 1960s, and is used for the storage and sorting of clothes and donations. A hostel for homeless men was built at the rear of the site c.1982, and operated as such until June 1994, since which time it has been used as a welfare office and drop-in centre.

The Society of St Saint Vincent de Paul is an international fraternal organisation of lay people, and the largest lay organisation in the Catholic Church. The Society was named after Saint Vincent de Paul whose life was devoted to helping the poor and the underprivileged.

Frederic Ozanam was born in 1813 in Milan, at that time a French city. Two years later his family returned to Lyons where he spent his youth. At an early age he decided to commit himself to the promotion of better social conditions, the raising of moral standards and the restoration of the catholic faith in France. In 1833, at the University of Paris, Ozanam and his companions formed the Conference of Charity to visit and assist the poor, which two years later became the Society of Saint Vincent de Paul. Ozanam became renowned both for his defence of the faith and his charity towards adversaries. He died in 1853 after a long illness.

The depression of the early 1890s prompted the foundation of the Society of Saint Vincent de Paul in Queensland. At the same time, the disastrous flood of the Brisbane River in February 1893 caused great hardship, particularly to the poor of the city. As the Red Hill area was one of the poorest in the city, the parish priest Father J Hegarty called a meeting of his parishioners and the first Conference was formed on 18 February 1894 at Saint Brigids Parish, Red Hill.

== Description ==
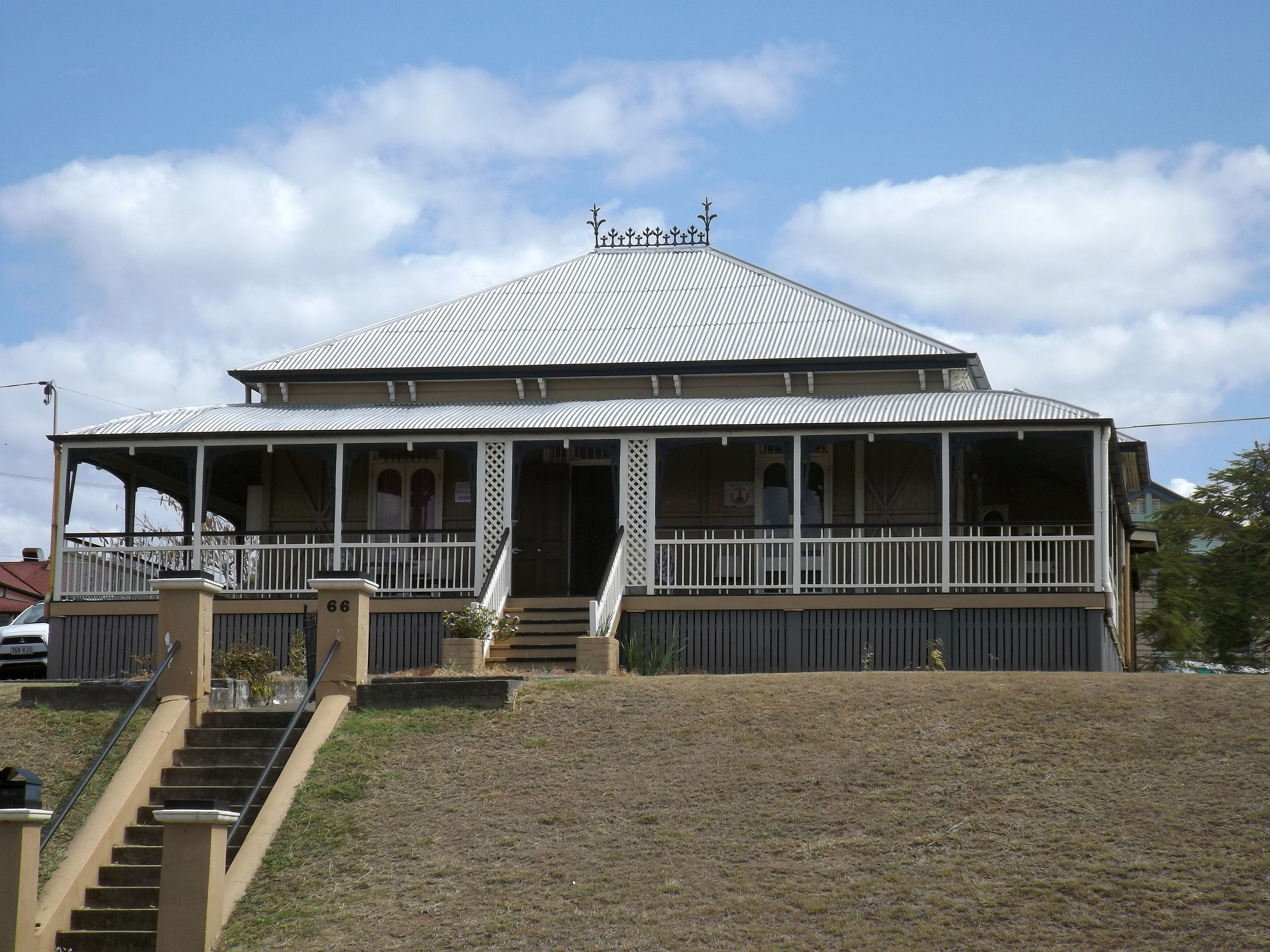
Residence in 2015

Ozanam House, a single-storeyed timber building with timber stumps and a hipped corrugated iron roof with cast iron ridge cresting and paired timber eave brackets, is located on a northerly sloping site fronting Roderick Street to the north and bordered by Waghorn and Omar Streets. The building is situated opposite Baines park and has views over Ipswich to the northeast.

The chamferboard building has verandahs all round, with the southeast corner enclosed and a kitchen wing at the rear southwest corner. Verandahs have single-skin exposed framed timber walls, curved corrugated iron awnings, curved timber valance and tapered timber brackets, timber dowel balustrades, battened timber skirt between stumps on the north, and timber lattice panels either side of the central entrance stair. The timber verandah details, together with the front row of square stumps, appear to be of a later date of construction than the house. Arch paned French doors open onto the verandahs, and the main entrance has a timber panelled door with patterned glass sidelights and fanlight.

Internally, the building has a central corridor with two rooms on the eastern side, used for storage and containing built in cupboards, and one large room on the western side containing a room divide with timber battened valance. Ceilings are hardboard with timber coverstrips, and walls are vertically boarded. A leaded glass door opens into the kitchen. A lean-to laundry is located on the rear of the kitchen, and a toilet on the southern side of the rear verandah.

A weatherboard shed with corrugated iron gable roof and concrete stumps is located to the south of the house. This building has high level timber hopper shutters and is used for storage. Two large trees are located to the west of the house, and a planted embankment is located along the Roderick and Waghorn Street frontages. A path and concrete steps with a metal gate lead from the house north to Roderick Street.

== Heritage listing ==
Ozanam House was listed on the Queensland Heritage Register on 21 October 1992 having satisfied the following criteria.

The place is important because of its aesthetic significance.

Ozanam House, one of a group of houses located in a prominent position overlooking Ipswich to the northeast, is a highly decorative 1880s timber residence which makes a substantial contribution to the Roderick Street streetscape and Ipswich townscape.

The place has a special association with the life or work of a particular person, group or organisation of importance in Queensland's history.

The building has been associated with the community and charity work of the Society of Saint Vincent de Paul within Ipswich since 1960.
