= Ching Valdes-Aran =

Filipino-American actress, dancer, and choreographer

- Born: San Nicolas, Ilocos Norte, Philippines
- Occupation: Actress · Dancer · Choreographer
- Years active: 1985–present

Ching Valdes-Aran (also credited as Ching Valdes and Ching Valdes/Aran) is a Filipino-American actress of stage, television, and film, who was trained as a dancer and became a choreographer.

== Early life and education ==
Valdes-Aran was born in San Nicolas, Ilocos Norte, in the Philippines. At age 13, she joined the Filipinescas Dance Company in Manila. She moved to New York City in 1967, and became an Asst. Director of the Philippine Dance Company of New York (est. 1943, Bruna Pascua Seril). Her membership included the Reynaldo Alejandro Dance Theater, and the All Nations Dance Company. In the late '70s, her work moved into choreography and directing solo dance (e.g., Ilocana). Having seen shows and met actors at La MaMa, she began working towards becoming an actress. The Pan Asian Repertory was a La MaMa resident company, which enabled her to meet other Asian-American artists to hone her craft.

== Career ==
=== Television ===
Credited as Ching Valdes, her screen debut came in 1985 on the CBS series The Equalizer in the second episode "China Rain" in which she portrayed Tommy Li, an "Old Times" acquaintance of Robert McCall from the underworld of Hong Kong where heroin smuggling was prevalent, and lucrative. Forty years afterwards in 2025, she portrayed Lorna Bayani, Mel Bayani's mother, in season five of the 2021 re-imagined series in the episode, "Dirty Sexy Money."

In 1987, Valdes-Aran played Mama-San in the HBO anthology, Vietnam War Story in episode three, "The Pass" with Tony Becker, Merritt Butrick and Wendell Pierce.

Other television appearances include, Law & Order: Criminal Intent (2004), The Blacklist (2013), Elementary (2017), and Blindspot (2017), among others.

=== Film ===
Valdes-Aran's film debut came in the experimental 1994 film, Fresh Kill, written by Jessica Hagedorn who also wrote Dogeaters (see Theatre below). This was followed by her role as Ms. Amador, the Marriage Broker, in Closer to Home (1995).

Other film appearances include, Across the Universe (2007), Sex and the City (2008), Kiss of the Damned (2012), From What Is Before (2014), Little Men (2016), and a voice role as Gamu in Missing Link (2019).

=== Theatre ===
In 1996, Ching Valdes-Aran stage appearances included, Flipzoids by Ralph B. Peña, Theater for the New City, Ma-Yi Theatre Ensemble. In 1998 she portrayed Emelda Marcos, the First Lady of the Philippines (1965–1986) in Dogeaters by Jessica Hagedorn, for the La Jolla Playhouse, California.

In 2014, she played Mr. Wang in a Classic Stage Company production of A Man's A Man.

From 2017–2023, Valdes-Aran toured internationally in Geoff Sobelle's Home. In 2023, she appeared with an all-Asian cast in Sam Shepard's True West at People's Light and Theatre Company.

Her Broadway credits include Shakespeare on Broadway, New York Shakespeare Festival, Belasco Theatre, and Michael John LaChiusa's The Wild Party, directed by George C. Wolfe (at Virginia Theatre).

Off-Broadway appearances: Brooklyn Academy of Music, Classic Stage Company, Shakespeare in the Park, HERE Arts Center, La MaMa, Ma-Yi Theater, Mabou Mines, The National Asian American Theatre Co (NAATCO), New York Theatre Workshop, The Public Theater, and Women's Project Theater, among others.

Regional appearances: Atlantic Theater Company, Arena Stage, Bristol Riverside, Center Stage, Cincinnati Playhouse, Magic Theater, Syracuse Stage, Yale Repertory Theatre, and Wilma Theatre.

== Awards and achievements ==
In 1997, Valdes-Aran won an Obie Award for Distinguished Performance by an Actress for her role as Aying in Flipzoids, Ma-Yi Theatre.

Ching Valdes-Aran has also received the following: 2021 Ruthie Award, Fox Foundation Fellow, New Dramatist's Charles Bowden Award, Asian Cultural Council Fellowship, Spencer Cherashore Award, Ma-Yi Theater Award for Artistic Excellence, MAP Grantee (Foundry), U.S. Congressional Award for Arts & Culture, Oniros Best Supporting Actor (Short Film Award, Final Polish).

As an actor, choreographer, and director, Valdes-Aran has been empaneled to advise the National Endowment for the Arts.

== Personal life ==
Ching Valdes-Aran resides in New York City.

== Filmography ==
=== Film ===
Ching Valdes-Aran film credits
Year	Title	Role	Notes	Ref
1994	Fresh Kill	Boss Man		
1995	Closer to Home	Ms. Amador	aka Looking for America	
2007	Across the Universe	Luna Park		
2008	Sex and the City	Real Estate Agent		
2012	Kiss of the Damned	Irene Polo		
2014	From What Is Before	Babu	Originally: Mula sa kung ano ang noon Best Picture, Gawad Uriah Award; Palm de Oro, Locarno International Festival	
2016	Little Men	Pilar		
2019	Missing Link	Gamu (voice)		

=== Television ===
Year	Title	Role	Notes	Ref
1985	The Equalizer	Tommy Li	Episode: "China Rain" (S1.E2)	
1987	Vietnam War Story	Mama-San	Episode: "The Pass" (S1.E3)	
1988	The Equalizer	Joy Tang	Episode: "Video Games" (S3.E14)	
2004	Law & Order: Criminal Intent	Mrs. Chan	Episode: "F.P.S."	
2013	The Blacklist	Ruth Peasley	1 episode	
2017	Elementary	Shopkeep	1 episode	
2017	Blindspot	Elder Female Monk	Episode: "Lepers Repel" (S2.E22)	
2025	The Equalizer	Lorna Bayani	Episode: "Dirty Sexy Money" (S5.E10)	

== Stage roles ==
- Aying - Flipzoids, Ma-Yi Theatre - Obie Award
- Imelda Marcos - Dogeaters, Public Theatre - Lucille Lortel Awards nomination
- Lady Macbeth, Lady Capulet, Duke Senior - NYSF Shakespeare on Broadway, Belasco Theatre
- Mother Courage - Ma-yi Theatre
- Medea - Medea, Pan Asian Repertory
- Bernarda Alba - The House of Bernarda Alba, NAATCO
- Clytemnestra - Iphigenia in Aulis, Yale Rep
- Athena - Iphigenia in Taurus [sic], La Mama E.T.C. & Greek International Festival
- Empress Tzushi - Empress of China, Cincinnati Playhouse
- Philoktetes - Shatterhand Company, Berliner Fiespiele
- Mom - all-Asian cast production of Sam Shepard's True West at People's Light
