= Fourplay (2018 film) =

- Directed by: Dean Matthew Ronalds
- Written by: Dean Matthew Ronalds; Emanuela Galliussi; Francesco Plazza
- Produced by: Jamie Dolan; Emanuela Galliussi; Dean Matthew Ronalds
- Starring: Tammy Blanchard; Bryan Greenberg; Dominic Fumusa; Emanuela Galliussi
- Cinematography: Adam D. Ouellette
- Production company: Falling Up Films
- Distributed by: Parade Deck Films
- Release date: 30 March 2018
- Running time: 77 minutes
- Country: United States
- Language: English

Fourplay is a 2018 American comedy-drama film directed by Dean Matthew Ronalds, starring Tammy Blanchard, Bryan Greenberg, Dominic Fumusa and Emanuela Galliussi.

== Cast ==
- Tammy Blanchard as Anna
- Bryan Greenberg as Tom
- Dominic Fumusa as Joe
- Emanuela Galliussi as Susan

== Release ==
The film was released on 30 March 2018.

== Reception ==
Frank Schenk of The Hollywood Reporter wrote that the film "comes across as a claustrophobic cinematic exercise."

Robert Abele of the Los Angeles Times wrote that "The actors gamely strive for conversational naturalism, but what they say matters little because you never sense anything other than an environment rigged to explode, rather than nurtured into emotional relevance."
