= The Equalizer (2021 TV series) =

2021 American crime drama television series

- Genre: Action; Crime drama; Vigilante
- Created by: Michael Sloan and Richard Lindheim
- Based on: The Equalizer by Michael Sloan and Richard Lindheim
- Developed by: Andrew W. Marlowe & Terri Edda Miller
- Showrunners: Andrew W. Marlowe; Terri Edda Miller; Joseph C. Wilson; Adam Glass
- Starring: Queen Latifah; Tory Kittles; Adam Goldberg; Liza Lapira; Laya DeLeon Hayes; Lorraine Toussaint; Chris Noth
- Music by: Ali Shaheed Muhammad and Adrian Younge; Robert Duncan and Sean Pack; James Poyser
- Country of origin: United States
- Original language: English
- No. of seasons: 5
- No. of episodes: 74 (list of episodes)

Production
- Executive producers: Liz Friedlander; Richard Lindheim; Queen Latifah; Shakim Compere; Debra Martin Chase; John Davis; John Fox; Terri Edda Miller; Andrew W. Marlowe; Randy Zisk; Joseph C. Wilson; Eric Laneuville; Loretha Jones; Adam Glass; Rob Hanning
- Producers: Zoe Robyn; Meredith Mills; Joe Gazzam; Erik Lee; Jamila Daniel; Raymond Quinlan; Jolian Blevins
- Cinematography: Gavin Kelly; Claudio Rietti; Stefan Czapsky; Ron Fortunato; Terrence Laron Burke; Jay Feather; Saade Mustafa; Cliff Charles; Tiffany Armour-Tejada
- Editors: James Kilton; Dorian Harris; Matthew Philip Smith; Nick Towle; Brock Hammitt; Doug Hannah; Steven Lang; James Michael Crawford; Debby Germino; Scott Lerner
- Camera setup: Single-camera
- Running time: 43–44 minutes
- Production companies: Davis Entertainment; Martin Chase Productions; Milmar Pictures; Wilson Avenue; Shattered Glass; Flavor Unit TV; CBS Studios; Universal Television

Original release
- Network: CBS
- Release: February 7, 2021 – May 4, 2025

Related
- The Equalizer (original series)

The Equalizer is an American crime drama television series that aired for five seasons on CBS from February 7, 2021, to May 4, 2025. It is the reboot of the original series of the same name created by Michael Sloan and Richard Lindheim. The series is co-created by executive producers Lindheim, with Sloan, and Queen Latifah, who also stars as the titular character. John Davis, John Fox, Debra Martin Chase, Andrew Marlowe, and Terri Miller also serve as executive producers.

In May 2025, the series was canceled after five seasons.

== Premise ==
The series centers on Robyn McCall, an enigmatic woman in New York City and single mother to teenage daughter, Delilah, with a mysterious background who uses her extensive skills to help those with nowhere else to turn, acting as a guardian angel and a defender for those who cannot defend themselves while pursuing her own redemption.

== Cast and characters ==
=== Main ===
- Queen Latifah as Robyn McCall, a.k.a. "the Equalizer", a divorced single mother and former CIA operative who acts as a street vigilante for justice.
- Tory Kittles as Marcus Dante, a divorced single father of two sons and an intelligent and shrewd NYPD detective on Robyn's trail because he is reluctant to have Robyn help him, but he finds common ground in getting justice.
- Adam Goldberg as Harry Keshegian, Melody's husband and a master hacker who faked his death with Robyn's help.
- Liza Lapira as Melody "Mel" Bayani, a former U.S. Air Force sniper turned owner of Haven Bar, which acts as a secret base of operations for Robyn, and an old friend of Robyn from her service days.
- Laya DeLeon Hayes as Delilah, Robyn's 15-year-old daughter, who is rebellious and feels neglected by Robyn, despite their attempts to bond with each other.
- Lorraine Toussaint as Aunt Vi, Robyn's wise paternal aunt, who lives with Robyn and Delilah, having moved from Milwaukee to help them out, and is an artist.
- Chris Noth as William Bishop (seasons 1–2), a quirky ex–CIA director and old friend of Robyn who now runs his own private security company. He acts as liaison between Robyn and the CIA.

=== Recurring ===
- Erica Camarano as Detective Paley (season 1; guest season 2), who works with Dante.
- Jennifer Ferrin as Avery Grafton (seasons 1–4), a district attorney who makes Robyn's arrest a priority.
- Frank Pando as Captain Tony Torres (seasons 1–2), Dante's original commanding officer.
- Tawny Cypress as Vanessa (season 2), Marcus Dante's ex-wife and mother to his two sons, Kyler and Stefon.
- Chris Vance as Mason Quinn (seasons 2–3), Robyn's nemesis.
- Dominic Fumusa as Detective Ken Mallory (season 2), a detective recruited by D.A. Grafton to identify and arrest Robyn.
- Brett Dalton as Carter Griffin (seasons 2–3), a CIA operative who secretly operates as a mole.
- Roma Maffia as Dr. Willa Roszak (seasons 2 and 5), a therapist who Mel sees for PTSD, and to whom Mel also refers Dante. Maffia appeared twice as a call-girl named Sindee in the 1985 first season of the original series, The Equalizer.
- Stephen Bishop as Dr. Miles Fulton (guest season 2; recurring seasons 3–5), a skilled surgeon, Robyn's ex-husband and Delilah's father.
- Valarie Pettiford as Carol Dante (seasons 2–3 and 5), Dante's mom and grandmother to his two sons, Kyler and Stefon. Pettiford guest-starred as Jackie in "No Place Like Home", a 1988 season three episode of the original 1985 series, The Equalizer.
- Danny Johnson as "Big Ben" Dante (seasons 2–5), Marcus Dante's father, with whom he has a troubled past.
- Nathaniel Logan McIntyre as Cameron (seasons 2 and 4–5), Delilah's boyfriend.
- Donal Logue as Colton Fisk (seasons 3–5), a CIA operative who becomes Bishop's de facto replacement.
- Indira G. Wilson as Captain Grace Watkins (seasons 3–5), Dante's new precinct captain.
- Christopher B. Duncan as Captain Curtis Martin (season 5), an NYPD captain and Aunt Vi's friend and love interest.
- Michael Michele as Evelyn Rodgers (season 5), Aunt Vi's friend.

=== Notable guest stars ===
- Laila Robins as CIA Director Suri Nance (season 1) in "The Milk Run". Robins also played Cindy Claussen on the original 1985 series The Equalizer in the 1988 season four premiere, "The Last Campaign".
- Jada Pinkett Smith as Jessie "the Worm" Cook (season 2), a former colleague of Robyn who is a master thief.
- Gloria Reuben as Trish (season 3)
- Kelly Rowland as Misty (season 3)
- Mike Epps as J.J. Cranson (season 4)
- Titus Welliver as Elijah Reed (season 5), a former top CIA operative with a dark secret who is connected to Robyn McCall by an old mentor.
- Juani Feliz as Samantha Reed (season 5), who is trained by her father to be a weapons expert, skilled martial artist and true chameleon all while hiding a mysterious past.
- Ching Valdes-Aran as Lorna Bayani (season 5), Mel's mother introduced in "Dirty Sexy Money". Valdes-Aran debuted onscreen 40 years prior in 1985 on the original series in the second episode "China Rain", co-starring as Tommy Li, Robert McCall's Company asset from the Asian underworld.
- The Lady of Rage as Bianca Silva (Season 5), an inmate at a prison who bumps heads with Robyn when she and Mel go undercover to look for a prisoner who went missing the day of her release.

== Episodes ==
Season	Episodes	Originally released	
Season	Episodes	First released	Last released
1	10	February 7, 2021	May 23, 2021
2	18	October 10, 2021	May 15, 2022
3	18	October 2, 2022	May 21, 2023
4	10	February 18, 2024	May 19, 2024
5	18	October 20, 2024	May 4, 2025

== Production ==
=== Development ===
In November 2019, CBS announced that a reboot was in development with Queen Latifah in the lead role as Robyn McCall. Andrew Marlowe and Terri Miller would serve as showrunners with Latifah herself as an executive producer. On January 27, 2020, CBS issued a pilot order for the new version. Production companies involved with the pilot include Flavor Unit, Davis Entertainment, Martin Chase Productions and CBS Television Studios and Universal Television. On May 8, 2020, it was announced that the production had been given a series order. On March 9, 2021, CBS renewed the series for a second season. On May 1, 2022, Marlowe and Miller stepped down as showrunners and are being replaced by Joseph C. Wilson and Adam Glass. On May 5, 2022, CBS renewed the series for its third and fourth seasons. On April 25, 2024, CBS renewed the series for a fifth season. On May 2, 2025, CBS canceled the series after five seasons.

=== Casting ===
In February 2020, it was announced that Liza Lapira and Lorraine Toussaint had been cast alongside Queen Latifah in the pilot's lead roles. On March 3, 2020, it was announced that Tory Kittles joined the cast in a starring role. On May 8, 2020, it was announced that Chris Noth joined a starring role along with Latifah. On December 21, 2021, CBS and Universal Television announced Noth was terminated from the series after sexual assault allegations were made against him. His final appearance was in the middle of the second season. On January 3, 2022, it was reported that Noth had made his last appearance in "Separated" due to allegations that he assaulted women in December 2021. On September 20, 2022, it was announced that Donal Logue and Gloria Reuben joined the cast in undisclosed capacities for the third season.

=== Filming ===
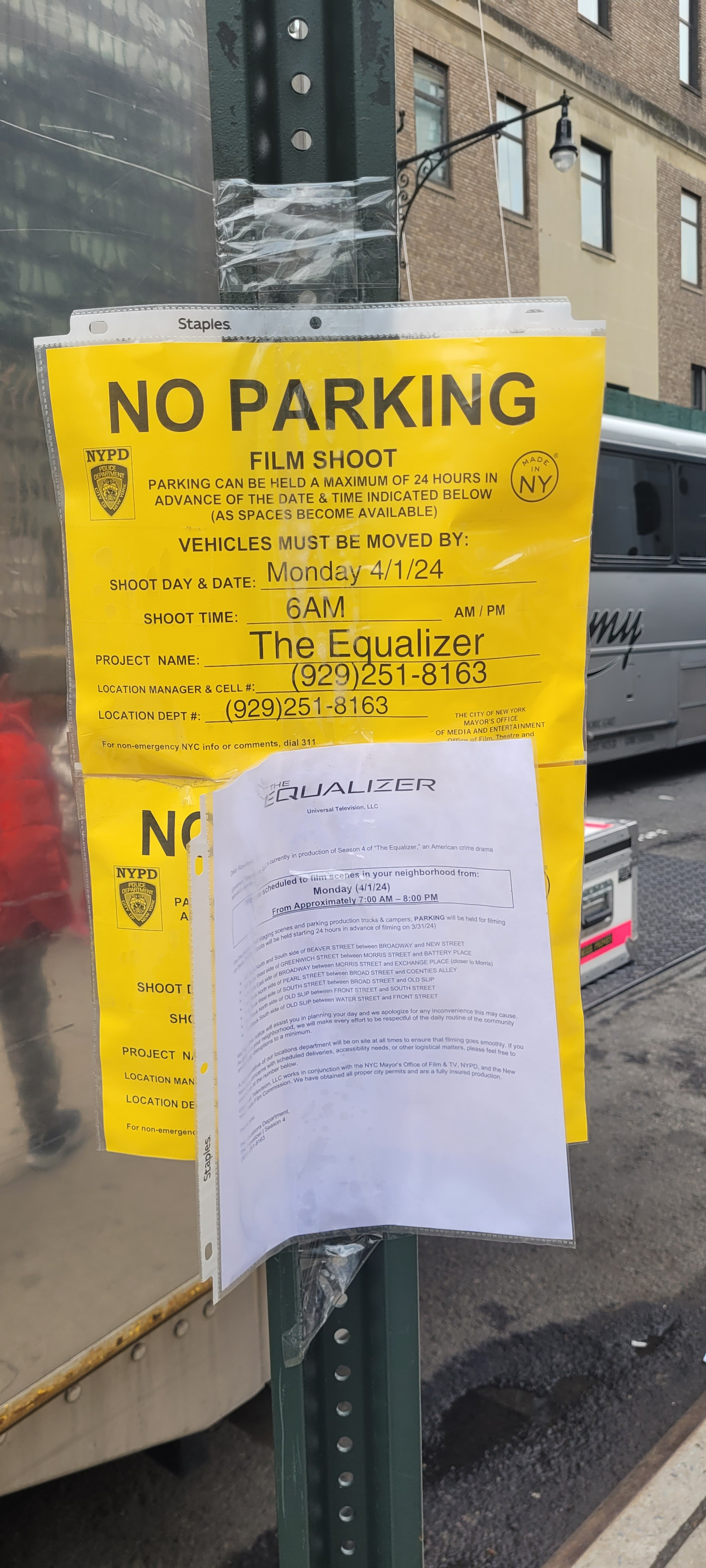
A notice from the NYPD stating that The Equalizer is being filmed on April 1, 2024

The pilot was slated to film in New York City in March 2020. Production was delayed as a direct result of the COVID-19 pandemic in the United States before filming could begin. On February 9, 2021, it was reported that production had been temporarily suspended due to a positive COVID-19 test.

Filming for the series has taken place in several locations in northern New Jersey, including Paterson, Newark, and Jersey City. Exterior shots of a Jersey City home are used for Robyn McCall's residence.

== Broadcast ==
The Equalizer premiered on February 7, 2021, after Super Bowl LV on CBS. The second season premiered on October 10, 2021. The third season premiered on October 2, 2022. The fourth season premiered on February 18, 2024. The fifth season premiered on October 20, 2024. The full series is available on Paramount+ in the U.S. The first three seasons became available on Netflix in the U.S. at the end of the December 2024, where it became one of the top ten series in minutes viewed based on Nielsen ratings across both streaming services. The first four seasons became available on the free streaming service Tubi in March 2025.

The series had its series premiere in Germany on Sky One on July 12, 2021, in the UK on Sky Witness on August 3, 2021, and in Italy on Sky Investigation (local version of Sky Witness) on October 3, 2021.

== Marketing ==
On May 19, 2020, a 30-second teaser featuring Queen Latifah explaining her involvement in the series was released by CBS. On January 9, 2021, CBS released the first official teaser for the series.

== Reception ==
=== Critical response ===
On Rotten Tomatoes, the show's first season has an approval rating of 67% based on reviews from 30 critics, with an average rating of 6/10. The website's critical consensus states: "Queen Latifah returns to the small screen in full command of her craft—if only The Equalizer's overly-engineered early episodes were on her level." On Metacritic (which uses a weighted average), the season has a score of 57 out of 100 based on 15 critics, indicating "mixed or average" reviews.

=== Ratings ===
Viewership and ratings per season of The Equalizer
Season	Timeslot (ET)	Episodes	First aired		Last aired		TV season	Viewership rank	Avg. viewers (millions)	18–49 rank	Avg. 18–49 rating
Season	Timeslot (ET)	Episodes	Date	Viewers (millions)	Date	Viewers (millions)	TV season	Viewership rank	Avg. viewers (millions)	18–49 rank	Avg. 18–49 rating
1	Sunday 10:00 p.m. (1); Sunday 8:00 p.m. (2–10)	10	February 7, 2021	20.40	May 23, 2021	7.13	2020–21	4	12.07	8	1.7
2	Sunday 8:00 p.m. (1, 4–6, 8, 10–18); Sunday 8:30 p.m. (2–3, 9); Sunday 9:00 p.m. (7)	18	October 10, 2021	7.67	May 15, 2022	6.84	2021–22	7	9.42	30	0.9
3	Sunday 8:00 p.m. (2, 4–5, 7–18); Sunday 8:30 p.m. (1, 3, 6)	18	October 2, 2022	7.09	May 21, 2023	6.28	2022–23	11	8.38	35	0.6
4	Sunday 8:00 p.m.	10	February 18, 2024	6.46	May 19, 2024	6.36	2023–24	12	7.89	37	0.5
5	Sunday 8:30 p.m. (7); Sunday 9:00 p.m. (3, 5); Sunday 9:30 p.m. (1–2); Sunday 10:00 p.m. (4, 6, 8–18)	18	October 20, 2024	4.61	May 4, 2025	4.19	2024–25	TBD	TBD	TBD	TBD

== Canceled spin-off ==
In January 2021, when asked about the show's relationship to the film series starring Denzel Washington, Marlowe stated that while they are focusing on establishing the television series to stand on its own, they are leaving the opportunity open for a crossover between the two in the future.

Deadline reported in November 2024 that CBS was exploring a spin-off of the show with two new characters, later reported to be played by Titus Welliver and Juani Feliz, set to guest star in an episode of the main series set to air in the second quarter of 2025 as a backdoor pilot. In April 2025 after the airing of the episode, it was reported that the spin-off would not be moving forward at CBS.
