= Valarie Pettiford =

American actress and singer (born 1960)

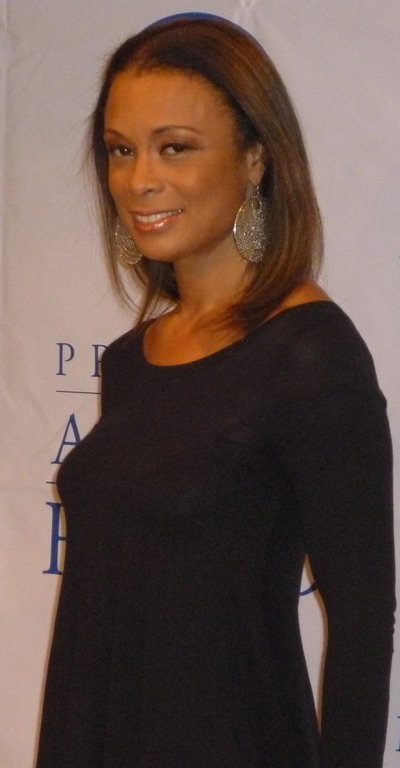
- Pettiford in 2009
- Born: July 8, 1960 (age 66); New York City, U.S.
- Education: High School of Performing Arts
- Occupations: Actress; dancer; singer
- Years active: 1978–present
- Spouse: Tony Rader

Valarie Pettiford (born July 8, 1960) is an American stage and television actress, dancer, and jazz singer. She received a Tony Award nomination for her role in the broadway production Fosse. She is also known for her role as Deirdre "Big Dee Dee" LaFontaine Thorne on the UPN television sitcom Half & Half.

== Stage ==
Pettiford began her career as a dancer and choreographer in Bob Fosse productions on Broadway. Alvin Klein of the New York Times wrote of her role in the 1983 musical revue Ladies and Gentlemen, Jerome Kern! that "You will not for a moment take your eyes off Valarie Pettiford, the show's standout: a sinewy dancer who can be sultry or sweet, measure for measure, as prescribed.... Miss Pettiford appears to be a superbly trained dancer, schooled in balletic finesse and Broadway-style razzmatazz - and a stunning presence." Leah Frank, also in the NYT, wrote of Pettiford's appearance in West Side Story in 1987: "The mainstay of the supporting cast is Valarie Pettiford, whose Anita is spicy, sensual and full of fire. She is an exciting actress who has a special quality needed to ignite a number such as America."

In 1994, she played lesbian Cassandra Keefer in The Naked Truth, and from 1995 to 1996 starred as Julie in a touring production of Show Boat.

Pettiford received a Tony nomination as Best Featured Actress in a Musical and a Dora Mavor Moore Award nomination for her role in the Broadway production Fosse from 1998 to 1999. Variety said Pettiford gave "a coolly elegant vocal rendition, [and she] is also a sultry, powerful dancer." She left Fosse to appear as Velma Kelly in Chicago in the West End in London from August 1999 to February 2000, alongside Chita Rivera as Roxie Hart.

In 2007, Pettiford won the Backstage Bistro Award for her cabaret debut at the Metropolitan Room in New York City, and won an NAACP Theatre Award for her lead role in The Wild Party. In 2008, she starred in a solo show, Valarie Pettiford - Thankful that played in New York City and Los Angeles. In 2009, she starred in the solo show Valarie Pettiford - The Concert in New York City.

== Film ==
In 1978, at age 17 and enrolled at the High School of Performing Arts, Pettiford did her first-ever movie work as part of the large ensemble in the film The Wiz. She starred as Mariah Carey's mother in the 2001 film Glitter, had a role in Stomp the Yard in 2007, and played Aunt Geneva in the 2011 film, Jumping the Broom.

== Television ==
Pettiford's first television series role was Jackie in "No Place Like Home," a 1988 episode of the original series, The Equalizer. She went on to play a reoccurring role as Carol Dante, the mother of series-regular character Marcus Dante, in the 2021 reboot of The Equalizer. Afterwards, in the 1990s, Pettiford appeared on daytime soap operas, including Another World and One Life to Live (where she originated the role of Sheila Price). Her Half & Half role from 2002 to 2006 as Dee Dee Thorne gained her three NAACP Image Award nominations. From 2008 to 2009, she played Sandra Lucas in the comedy-drama series Tyler Perry's House of Payne. She also appeared in the HBO pilot Anatomy of Hope, directed by J. J. Abrams. Pettiford plays a recurring role as the wife to Harold Cooper (Harry Lennix), Assistant Director of the FBI Counter-Terrorism Division, on the NBC drama The Blacklist. She has also starred in the TV series A Discovery of Witches as the witch Emily Mather.

In September 2024, it was announced Pettiford had joined the cast of The Young and the Restless in the role of Amy Lewis. She also portrays Charlotte Duncan on Carl Weber’s The Family Business.

== Music ==
She replaced Sybil Thomas of Raw Silk during their concert tour 1982. While on Half & Half, Pettiford released a jazz album, Hear My Soul, in 2005.

== Early and personal life ==
Pettiford was born on July 8, 1960, in Queens, to Ralph and Blanch Pettiford, and graduated from the High School of Performing Arts in 1978. She is married to her manager, actor and former Philadelphia Phillies pitcher Tony Rader. They got engaged in 1991.

== Filmography ==
=== Film ===
Valarie Pettiford film credits
Year	Title	Role	Notes
1978	The Wiz	Chorus Member	
1984	The Cotton Club	Dancer	
1988	Robots	Newscaster	Video
1990	Street Hunter	Denise	
2001	Confidences	Sean	Short
2001	Glitter	Lillian Frank	
2002	Like Mike	Mrs Boyd	
2003	Paris	Terry	
2007	Stomp the Yard	Aunt Jackie	
2007	The Stolen Months of September	Counselor	
2009	Why Am I Doing This?	Natalie	
2009	Guys and Dolls at the Hollywood Bowl	Hot Box Girl	Video
2009	Anatomy of Hope	Deanna Rivers	TV movie
2010	Why Did I Get Married Too?	Harriet	
2010	Not Your Time	Angel of Death	Short
2011	Jumping the Broom	Aunt Geneva	
2011	Nurse Jackée	-	Short
2012	Battlefield America	Ms. Williams	
2012	Note to Self	Mildred 'Momma' King	
2012	Birth Mother	Olivia	Short
2013	Love Will Keep Us Together	Paula	TV movie
2013	The Dempsey Sisters	Elizabeth Dempsey	
2015	My Favorite Five	Pamela Colburn	
2015	Will to Love	Avyon Hawkins	TV movie
2015	Welcome to the Family	Angela	TV movie
2016	The Secrets of Emily Blair	Detective Henson	
2016	Boy Bye	Linda	
2016	A Moment	Dana	Short
2017	The Preacher's Son	First Lady Charlene Wilson	
2018	The Choir Director	First Lady Charlene Wilson	
2018	No More Mr Nice Guy	Lorna Monroe	
2018	We Belong Together	Diane	
2018	Jingle Belle	Faith Williams	TV movie
2019	Blind Sight	Cheryl	Short
2019	If Not Now, When?	Lorna	
2020	Surviving in L.A.	Suzanne	
2020	Love Is Love Is Love	Wendy	
2021	Senior Moment	Judge Alice Miller	
2021	Hip Hop Family Christmas	Nancy	TV movie
2021	Merry Switchmas	Colleen	

=== Television ===
Valarie Pettiford television credits
Year	Title	Role	Notes
1988	The Equalizer	Jackie	Episode: "No Place Like Home"
1988–1990	Another World	Detective Courtney Walker	Regular Cast
1990–1994	One Life to Live	Dr. Sheila Price	Regular Cast
1996	The Sentinel	Angie Ferris	Episode: "Out of the Past"
1997	Silk Stalkings	Marnie	Episode: "Silent Witness"
1997	Honey, I Shrunk the Kids: The TV Show	Bianca Fleischer/Persephone	Episode: "Honey, You Got Nine Lives" & "Honey, I Got Duped"
1997–1998	Fame L.A.	Sylvia Williams	Recurring cast
1998	Walker, Texas Ranger	Angel Blake	Episode: "Angel"
1998	Sliders	Dr. Grace Venable	Episode: "Asylum"
1999	The X-Files	FBI Agent Ann Jones	Episode: "Two Fathers"
2001	Any Day Now	Valerie	Episode: "10 Days? Are You Crazy?"
2001	Jack & Jill	Gabi	Episode: "Caution: Parents Crossing"
2001	Sabrina, The Teenage Witch	Calliope	Episode: "Sabrina, The Muse"
2001	Frasier	P.R. Woman	Episode: "Hooping Cranes"
2001	Men, Women & Dogs	Teri Forrester	Episode: "Top Dog"
2002	State of Grace	-	Episode: "Fortunate Son"
2002	The West Wing	White House Security Guard Janice Allen	Episode: "Enemies Foreign and Domestic"
2002–2004	The District	Gayle Noland	Guest: Season 2, Recurring cast: Season 3-4
2002–2006	Half & Half	Deirdre "Big Dee Dee" LaFontaine Thorne	Main Cast
2006	CSI: Miami	Dr. Lana Whitford	Episode: "Open Water"
2007	CSI: Crime Scene Investigation	Susan Latham	Episode: "Fallen Idols"
2007	Bones	Ellen Laskow	Episode: "The Bodies in the Book"
2008–2011	Tyler Perry's House of Payne	Sandra Lucas	Recurring cast: Season 4-7
2009	Criminal Minds	Sharon Harris	Episode: "Soul Mates"
2011	The Cape	Judge Valerie Preston	Episode: "Scales on a train"
2012	The Finder	Chatney DuBois	Episode: "Bullets"
2012	Hart of Dixie	Carolyn Hayes	Episode: "Snowflakes & Soulmates"
2012	Bunheads	Vi	Episode: "For Fanny"
2012	Treme	Victorine Fornerat-Williams	Episodes: "Knock with Me-Rock With Me" & "Saints"
2013	Golden Boy	Maxine Owen	Recurring cast
2013	True Blood	Mary Wright	Episodes: "In the Evening" & "Dead Meat"
2015–2016	Born Again Virgin	Beverly	Guest: Season 1, Recurring cast: Season 2
2015–2021	The Blacklist	Charlene Cooper	Recurring cast: Season 2-3 & 9, guest: Season 8
2016	Black-ish	Donna Duckworth	Episode: "Johnson & Johnson"
2017	Being Mary Jane	Rhonda Sales	Recurring cast: Season 4
2017–2018	Valor	Simone Porter	Recurring cast
2018–Present	The Family Business	Charlotte Duncan	Main Cast
2018–2022	A Discovery of Witches	Emily Mather	Main Cast
2019	The Baxters	Diane	Recurring cast: Season 3
2020	BlackAF	Grandma	Episode: "yo, between you and me... this is because of slavery"
2021	Home Economics	Rachel	Episode: "Triple Scoop of Ice Cream, $6.39"
2021	A Luv Tale: The Series	Diana	Recurring cast
2021	NCIS	Sonia Eberhart	Episode: "Road to Nowhere" & "Great Wide Open"
2022	First Wives Club	Nancy	2 episodes
2022–2024	The Equalizer	Carol Dante	3 episodes "D.W.B." (S2.E13) "Blowback" (S3.E5) "Take My Life...Please!" (S5.E5)

== Stage roles ==
- The Wiz (2006), Aunt Em
- The Wild Party (2005)
- He Hunts (2002), Leontine Duchotel
- Gentlemen Prefer Blondes (2002), Dorothy Shaw
- Chicago (August 1999—February 2000), Velma Kelly
- Fosse (1998—99)
- Show Boat (1995—96), Julie
- Freefall (1994)
- The Naked Truth (1994), Cassandra Keefer
- Weird Romance (1992), Shannara and other roles
- West Side Story (1987), Anita
- Big Deal (1986), Pearl, dance captain
- Ladies and Gentlemen, Jerome Kern (1985), choreographer
- Grind (1985), Fleta
- Dancin' (1979), performer
- Sophisticated Ladies (1978), a sophisticated lady and understudy for Miss Jamison, dance captain
- A Broadway Musical (1978), swing performer
- Summer and Smoke
- The Balcony
- Beehive
- Tango Apasionato
- Sarah and Abraham
- She Stoops to Conquer
- Sweet Charity
