= Take Two (TV series) =

2018 American crime comedy-drama television series

- Genre: Police procedural; Crime; Comedy drama
- Created by: Andrew W. Marlowe; Terri Edda Miller
- Starring: Rachel Bilson; Eddie Cibrian; Xavier de Guzman; Aliyah O'Brien; Alice Lee
- Composer: Robert Duncan
- Country of origin: United States
- Original language: English
- No. of seasons: 1
- No. of episodes: 13

Production
- Executive producers: Andrew W. Marlowe; Terri Edda Miller; Rola Bauer; Tim Hilkin
- Production locations: Burnaby, British Columbia
- Cinematography: Brian Pearson
- Camera setup: Single-camera
- Running time: 43 minutes
- Production companies: ABC Studios; MilMar Pictures; Tandem Communications; StudioCanal

Original release
- Network: ABC
- Release: June 21 – September 13, 2018

Take Two is an American crime comedy-drama television series. Created by Andrew W. Marlowe and Terri Edda Miller, the creator and executive producer of Castle respectively, it stars Rachel Bilson and Eddie Cibrian. It premiered on ABC in the United States on June 21, 2018. In November 2018, the series was canceled after one season.

== Premise ==
The series centers on Sam, fresh out of rehab and the former star of a hit cop TV series, and Eddie, a private investigator. They team up to solve crimes as Sam needs to conduct research for a potential comeback role. To get a P.I. movie lead, she has to shadow Eddie, an ex-LAPD detective-turned-private-eye. After solving a case, Sam decides to become Eddie's partner and learn more about being a P.I. after realizing that her acting skills make her a natural at the job.

== Cast and characters ==
=== Main ===
- Rachel Bilson as Sam Swift, a disgraced actress who famously played a detective in a TV series, Hot Suspect, with over 200 episodes before her career collapsed due to alcohol problems. After leaving rehab, she starts over by becoming a P.I. working alongside Eddie, at first doing so to gain firsthand experience for a potential movie role before deciding that being a private detective is more fulfilling.
- Eddie Cibrian as Eddie Valetik, a private investigator and former LAPD detective who now works as a consultant with the department. He is cynical about Sam, seeing her as a liability to his job, but ultimately makes her his partner when she demonstrates a willingness to learn the ropes of being a P.I.
- Xavier de Guzman as Roberto "Berto" Vasquez, Eddie's tech assistant.
- Aliyah O'Brien as Detective Christine "Chris" Rollins, an LAPD detective. Rollins and Eddie have an on-again/off-again relationship.
- Alice Lee as Monica, Sam's unpaid assistant who is working towards her PhD in Psychology.

=== Recurring ===
- Jordan Gavaris as Mick English, a medical examiner.
- Heather Doerksen as Syd, Sam's agent who hooks her up with Eddie's detective agency.
- Lamont Thompson as Zeus, Eddie's former partner from the LAPD who is currently a bar owner and runs a consulting firm that uses top-notch security systems.

== Episodes ==
No.	Title	Directed by	Written by	Original release date	U.S. viewers (millions)
1	"Take Two"	John Terlesky	Andrew W. Marlowe & Terri Edda Miller	June 21, 2018	3.36
2	"Smoking Gun"	Holly Dale	Andrew W. Marlowe & Terri Edda Miller	June 28, 2018	3.01
3	"Taken"	Paul Holahan	David Amann	July 5, 2018	2.89
4	"Ex's and Oh's"	John Terlesky	Debra J. Fisher	July 12, 2018	2.78
5	"Death Becomes Him"	Holly Dale	Dan E. Fesman	July 19, 2018	3.12
6	"The Devil You Know"	Brad Turner	Mo Masi	July 26, 2018	2.52
7	"About Last Night"	Rob Lieberman	Kathy Miller Kelley	August 2, 2018	2.53
8	"All About Ava"	Dawn Wilkinson	Cooper McMains	August 9, 2018	2.95
9	"Shadows of the Past"	Michael Robison	Mark Shepherd	August 16, 2018	2.52
10	"Stillwater"	Rob Lieberman	Dan E. Fesman	August 30, 2018	1.85
11	"Family Ties"	Alexandra LaRoche	Debra J. Fisher & Mo Masi	August 30, 2018	2.40
12	"It Takes a Thief"	Guy Bee	David Amann	September 6, 2018	2.34
13	"One to the Heart"	Holly Dale	Terri Edda Miller & Andrew W. Marlowe	September 13, 2018	2.91

== Production ==
=== Development ===
The series, which was in development since late March 2016, was ordered straight-to-series by ABC on November 16, 2017, with German RTL Group's channel VOX and French France 2 instantly joining them. On November 21, 2018, ABC canceled the series after one season.

=== Casting ===
On November 16, 2017, Rachel Bilson and Eddie Cibrian were cast as Sam and Eddie, the female and male leads, respectively. Xavier de Guzman joined the cast as Berto on February 15, 2018, and afterwards on March 13, 2018, Aliyah O'Brien and Alice Lee were cast as Detective Christine Rollins and Monica, respectively.

=== Filming ===
Production of the series started shooting at Crossing Riverbend Studios in Burnaby, British Columbia, on February 26, 2018, and concluded on July 23, 2018.

== Reception ==
=== Critical response ===
On the review aggregator website Rotten Tomatoes, the series has an approval rating of 67% based on 15 reviews, with an average rating of 5.96/10. The website's critical consensus reads, "While Take Two is more entertaining than expected – with a desirable chemistry between the stars – the writing is too shaky to break its cookie-cutter mold." Metacritic, which uses a weighted average, scores the series 53 out of 100 based on 10 reviews, indicating "mixed or average reviews".

=== Ratings ===
Viewership and ratings per episode of Take Two
No.	Title	Air date	Rating/share (18–49)	Viewers (millions)	DVR (18–49)	DVR viewers (millions)	Total (18–49)	Total viewers (millions)
1	"Take Two"	June 21, 2018	0.5/2	3.36	0.3	1.65	0.8	5.01
2	"Smoking Gun"	June 28, 2018	0.4/2	3.01	0.3	1.65	0.7	4.66
3	"Taken"	July 5, 2018	0.4/2	2.89	0.3	1.50	0.7	4.39
4	"Ex’s and Oh’s"	July 12, 2018	0.5/2	2.78	0.2	1.35	0.7	4.13
5	"Death Becomes Him"	July 19, 2018	0.4/2	3.12	0.2	1.13	0.6	4.26
6	"The Devil You Know"	July 26, 2018	0.4/2	2.52	0.3	1.49	0.7	4.01
7	"About Last Night"	August 2, 2018	0.4/2	2.53	0.2	1.39	0.6	3.92
8	"All About Ava"	August 9, 2018	0.6/3	2.95	—N/a	—N/a	—N/a	—N/a
9	"Shadows of the Past"	August 16, 2018	0.4/2	2.52	0.2	1.46	0.6	3.96
10	"Stillwater"	August 30, 2018	0.2/1	1.85	0.2	—N/a	0.4	—N/a
11	"Family Ties"	August 30, 2018	0.4/2	2.40	0.2	—N/a	0.6	—N/a
12	"It Takes A Thief"	September 6, 2018	0.4/2	2.34	0.3	1.59	0.7	3.93
13	"One to the Heart"	September 13, 2018	0.5/2	2.91	0.2	—N/a	0.7	—N/a
