= Screamers (2016 film) =

#Screamers
- Directed by: Dean Matthew Ronalds
- Written by: Tom Malloy; Dean Matthew Ronalds
- Produced by: Russ Adams; Michelle Alexandria; Yuqing Chi; Emanuela Galliussi; Tom Malloy; Reynaldo Rodis; Dean Matthew Ronalds; Luchie Saile; Rob Weston
- Cinematography: Mark I. Davis
- Edited by: Aaron Gordon
- Music by: Jeffery Alan Jones
- Production company: Trick Candle Productions
- Distributed by: Epic Pictures Releasing
- Release date: November 10, 2016
- Running time: 85 minutes
- Country: United States
- Language: English

#Screamers is a 2016 American horror mystery film written and directed by Dean Matthew Ronalds.

== Plot ==
The film is presented as a self-made documentary about a startup online video platform named Gigaler as it is developing an algorithm to enhance its website to better tailor the videos displayed on its landing page to each visitor. An anonymously submitted screamer video of a girl walking through a cemetery before a masked man appears, accompanied by a loud scream, quickly becomes their most popular video. They soon receive a second screamer video of the same girl lying in a bed before the masked man appears, accompanied by a loud scream. Using the IP information from the video submission, Abbi tracks down Tara, the woman shown in the videos, and Tom calls her in Rochester, New York to obtain an exclusivity agreement to the videos. Meanwhile, commenters point out the woman in the video's resemblance to Tara Rogers, a woman who went missing from Rochester years earlier. Upset that he may be the target of a hoax, Tom calls Tara and demands answers. She refuses to speak out of fear of "Francis" and tells him not to call again. Abbi inspects the submitted videos and notices the grave of Francis Tumblety, one of the people suspected of being Jack the Ripper. They drive to Rochester to confront Tara, stopping first to film Tumblety's grave. They spend too much time there and end up at Tara's house very late, after it has already turned dark. Tom knocks but the inhabitants switch off the lights. They glimpse a man watching them from the street but the man disappears suddenly. They spend the night at the house of Abbi's cousin Emma, who had heard rumors about Tara before she went missing. The next day Tom and Griffin return to Tara's house alone, where they find one of the doors unlocked. In the basement they find dozens of jars but many of the other rooms are without furnishings or decorations. Upstairs they find the bedroom from second video of Tara just as Tom's car alarm begins to sound. Tom leaves Griffin alone upstairs as he runs down to switch off the alarm. Griffin feels anxious and turns to leave, coming face to face with Francis and disappearing. Tom returns upstairs and is also surprised by Francis. Chris gets a message from Tom's phone asking them to come to Tara's house so Emma drives him and Abbi there. They walk upstairs and find Tara but are caught by Francis. Emma escapes outside but somehow Francis is also outside and he chases her through the snow. Abbi escapes into a mud room, where Francis is inexplicably waiting for her behind a long coat. A video later submitted to Gigaler shows Abbi walking through the cemetery and stopping at the grave of Francis Tumblety before the masked man appears, accompanied by a loud scream.

== Cast ==
- Tom Malloy as Tom Brennan
- Chris Bannow as Chris Grabow
- Griffin Matthews as Griffin
- Emanuela Galliussi as Emma
- Theodora Miranne as Tara
- Abbi Snee as Abbi

== Production ==
Filming took place in Rochester, New York.

== Release ==
The film premiered at the Buffalo Dreams Fantastic Film Festival in Buffalo, New York at 7:00 p.m. on Thursday, November 10, 2016. It was shown at several other film festivals in 2016 and 2017 before receiving a limited release in the United States starting April 5, 2018.
