= Ernest Napoleon =

Russian producer and actor

- Born: Ernest Napoleon; Moscow, Russia
- Education: Computer Science degree
- Occupations: Actor, producer, writer
- Years active: 2015–present

Ernest Napoleon, is a Russian–Tanzanian film producer and actor.

== Personal life ==
He was born in Moscow, Russia to a Tanzanian father and a Russian mother. When he was 5 years of age, his family moved to Tanzania. After living in Dar es Salaam, Tanzania for 14 years and Los Angeles for 8 years, he relocated to Stockholm, Sweden.

== Career ==
At the age of 3, he made his acting debut in a Christmas play titled New Year's in the old Soviet Union. While in Tanzania, he worked as a TV presenter for EATV, the largest TV station in East Africa at the time. He also performed as a DJ artist at 'Club Billicanas', a prominent nightclub in Africa where he became a recording artist of Bongo Flava, a music genre in East Africa. He performed there by the name of 'MC Napo'.

As a teen, Ernest moved to Los Angeles and obtained a computer science degree. Then he studied acting and writing for 7 years while in Los Angeles. With the help of his friends and colleagues, he made his maiden feature film Going Bongo. The film is inspired by the life of a British surgeon, Dr Lewis Burger, in which Ernest played the titular role. His film is regarded as the first international film produced by a Tanzanian and the first ever East African film to be accepted by iTunes.

In 2017, he made the film Kiumeni which was shot in Dar es Salaam. The film received critical acclaim and later won two awards at the Zanzibar International Film Festival. He is the founder of the production house, Enigma Pictures. In 2017, he was appointed as the president of 'D Street Media Group', international production and distribution company. He also produced the TV Series Mother City and third film Peponi. During the same time, he co-produced the British film Let No Man Know which rotates around a true story about an African American slave.

== Filmography ==
| Year | Film | Role | Genre | Ref. |
|---|---|---|---|---|
| 2015 | Going Bongo | Executive producer, writer, actor: Dr.Lewis Burger | Film | |
| 2017 | Kiumeni | Executive producer, writer, actor: Gue | Film | |
| TBD | Peponi | Producer, writer, actor: Dullah | Film | |
| TBD | Let No Man Know | Producer | Film | |
