= Kiumeni =

2017 Swahili comedy film by Nicholas Marwa

- Directed by: Nicholas Marwa
- Written by: Daniel Manege; Ernest Napoleon
- Produced by: Daniel Manege; Ernest Napoleon
- Starring: Antu Mendoza; Ernest Napoleon; Irene Paul; Idris Sultan; Akbar Thabeet
- Cinematography: Takura Maurayi
- Edited by: Nicholas Marwa
- Production company: Busy Bees
- Release date: 1 March 2017 (Tanzania)
- Running time: 88 min.
- Country: Tanzania
- Language: Swahili

Kiumeni (Eng: Masculinity), is a 2017 Tanzanian comedy film directed by Nicholas Marwa and co-produced by Daniel Manege and Ernest Napoleon for D-Magic and Busy Bees respectively. The film stars Antu Mendoza and Ernest Napoleon in lead roles along with Irene Paul, Idris Sultan and Akbar Thabeet in supportive roles. The film is a Swahili love story between two distinct worlds; an affluent man meets his girlfriend in the ghetto.

The film received critical acclaim and was officially selected to screen at several international film festivals. The film won the Best Screenplay and Best Directing awards at the 2017 Zanzibar International Film Festival. The film is set in Dar es Salaam and shot in and around the cities of Mikocheni, Kinondoni, Sinza, Mbezi, Mwananyamala and Mburahati.

== Cast ==
- Antu Mendoza as Faith
- Ernest Napoleon as Gue
- Irene Paul as Irene
- Idris Sultan as Gasper
- Akbar Thabeet as Masto
