= Going Bongo =

- Directed by: Dean Matthew Ronalds
- Screenplay by: Ernest Napoleon
- Produced by: Nick Marwa; Brian Ronalds
- Starring: Ernest Napoleon
- Cinematography: Leslie Bumgarner
- Edited by: Masahiro Hirakubo
- Music by: Alex Hemlock
- Release date: 4 June 2015
- Running time: 95 minutes
- Countries: United States; Tanzania
- Language: English

Going Bongo is a 2015 American-Tanzanian comedy drama film directed by Dean Matthew Ronalds and produced by Brian Ronalds. The film stars Ernest Napoleon and features Emanuela Galliussi, Nyokabi Gethaiga and Ashley Olds. It was filmed in Los Angeles and Tanzania.

The film was nominated for the Zuku Bongo Movies Awards in 2015 to be announced at the Zanzibar International Film Festival. It won Best East-African Film.

== Plot ==
A newly recruited American doctor "accidentally" volunteers to work in Tanzania, Africa for a month. The film is based on a true story of a French doctor who left Europe to work in Africa.

== Cast ==
- Ernest Napoleon as Dr. Lewis Burger
- Emanuela Galliussi as Laura Carmenucci
- Ashley Olds as Marina Kezerian
- Nyokabi Gethaiga as Tina
- MacDonald Haule as Bahame
- Mariam Peter as Zola Mwandenga
- Evance Bukuku as Kaligo
- Gabriel Jarret as Brian Kaufman
- Jeff Joslin as Perry Weiss
- Betty Kazimbaya as Mama Mwandenga
- Ahmed Olotu as Yazidi
- Robert Sisko as Dr. Eliot Lerner
- Richard Halverson as Cyril Flaws
- Maiz Lucero as Dr. Trout
- Sauda Simba as Rose
- Meredith Thomas as Anne Lerner
- Milena Gardasevic as Coco Banaloche
- Felix Ryan as Armen
- Artem Belov as Marvin
- Jaykesh Biharilal Rathod as Indian Doctor
- Tasha Dixon as Gwen Kaufman
- D.A. Goodman as Man in Tuxedo
- Lisa Goodman as Aunt Tia
- Libertad Green as Lady in Evening Gown
- Serdar Kalsin as Uncle Hovan
- Amby Lusekelo as Hospital Clerk
- Mzome Mahmoud as Tende
- Robert McPhalen as Featured Background
- Maulidi Mfaume as Mob Leader
- Tukise Mogoje as Tende (voice)
- Casmir Mukohi Taxi Driver
- Dennis Nicomede Man in Tuxedo
- Abraham Ntonya Taxi Driver (voice)
- Charles Onesmo Thief
- Brian Ronalds Blossey Swanson
- Stephanie Ronalds Nurse Stephanie
- Queen Victoria of Sheba as Ma
- Anthony Skordi Pop
- Patrick Stalinski as Patrick Steel
- Sewell Whitney as Bill

== Release ==
The movie had its London premiere at CineWorld Haymarket on 4 June 2015.
