= List of The Equalizer (2021 TV series) episodes =

The Equalizer is an American crime drama television series that premiered on CBS on February 7, 2021. The series centers around Robyn McCall, an enigmatic woman in New York City and single mother to teenage daughter Delilah with a mysterious background who uses her extensive skills to help those with nowhere else to turn, acting as a guardian angel and a defender for those who cannot defend themselves while pursuing her own redemption. In May 2022, the series was renewed for its third and fourth seasons. The fourth season premiered on February 18, 2024. The fifth season premiered on October 20, 2024. In May 2025, CBS canceled the series after five seasons.

During the course of the series, 74 episodes of The Equalizer aired over five seasons, between February 7, 2021, and May 4, 2025.

== Series overview ==
Season	Episodes	Originally released	
Season	Episodes	First released	Last released
1	10	February 7, 2021	May 23, 2021
2	18	October 10, 2021	May 15, 2022
3	18	October 2, 2022	May 21, 2023
4	10	February 18, 2024	May 19, 2024
5	18	October 20, 2024	May 4, 2025

== Episodes ==
=== Season 1 (2021) ===
No. overall	No. in season	Title	Directed by	Written by	Original release date	U.S. viewers (millions)
1	1	"The Equalizer"	Liz Friedlander	Terri Edda Miller & Andrew W. Marlowe	February 7, 2021	20.40
Disenchanted with an unnamed U.S. government espionage agency known only as "The Company," Robyn McCall quits to raise her teenage daughter Delilah Fulton. By chance she follows a girl and saves her from sexual assault. But Jewel Machado is suspected of shooting a lawyer, Chance Kovak, from security video discovered by Detective Paley. Robyn contacts her old colleagues, Melody "Mel" Bayani and Harry Keshegian, to hide Jewel while she investigates. McCall's search is halted when Viola "Aunt Vi" Marsette calls about Delilah, who was drinking and smoking weed in a "boosted" dress. But McCall gets a clue for her trouble. Through careful undercover work, and with the assistance of her former boss and mentor William Bishop, Robyn captures two mercenaries employed by tech mogul Reese Pruitt, who had Chance murdered to cover up his discovery of a fatal flaw in the software for his latest product, a self-driving car. The mogul is arrested by Marcus Dante, an NYPD detective who Robyn met earlier while posing as Jewel's lawyer. Jewel is released and Robyn sets up an anonymous online message board: GOT A PROBLEM? ODDS AGAINST YOU? I CAN HELP. Note: This episode was dedicated to co-creator/executive producer Richard Lindheim, who died from heart failure while the series was in production.
2	2	"Glory"	Liz Friedlander	Terri Edda Miller & Andrew W. Marlowe	February 14, 2021	8.21
Robyn answers a call from Aliya Ekuban. Her son Jackson was kidnapped to force her to break into her employer's safe. Det. Paley tells Det. Dante, "facial rec on your mystery gal...negative...like she doesn't exist." McCall discovers the kidnapping is connected to sex trafficking by a club owner trying to find an informant working with FBI agent Frank Sadler. Meanwhile, Det. "Oz" Oswaldo tells Dante the bodies are of Max Kelso and Radek Goran..."definitely your gal." Robyn takes down the ring's stash house, and the deadline for Jackson's return is moved up. Robyn arranges for the owner's right-hand man to be framed as the informant, allowing her to rescue Jackson, deliver the real informant to the FBI, and get both the trafficker and his FBI mole arrested. Robyn tries to discover Delilah's secret; a Times Square choir performance. Delilah is upset that Robyn won't arrive in time, but Robyn manages to show. Robyn gets Bishop to cut a deal with the Company: she will freelance in exchange for a blind-eye about her vigilantism. Bishop comments, "You were always good at leveling the playing field. What did they used to call you in Kandahar?" McCall, "Al-Mueadil... The Equalizer."
3	3	"Judgment Day"	Solvan "Slick" Naim	Erica Shelton Kodish	February 21, 2021	8.13
Dale Aldridge, an innocent man escapes from prison looking for the man who framed him for murder. His old cellmate Tommy says Reggie "Preacher" Floyd confessed to it, but Dale is framed again for Tommy's murder. Dale's former lawyer Nic Palermo asks Robyn to find Dale, who is reluctant to put his life in someone else's hands. Robyn strikes a deal with Dante to obtain evidence that Dale was set up. When Dale gets arrested after his angry son betrays him and alerts the police, the defense requests that Judge Valerie Cooley recuse herself. Dante recruits D.A. Avery Grafton, then arrives with evidence that the judge, who prosecuted Dale's case covered up witness statements that would have helped him and arranged for the cellmate's murder to protect herself. The judge is taken into custody while Dante arrests the real murderer. Dante and Robyn come face to face. Dante doesn't approve of Robyn's methods and vows to go after her. Robyn knows Dante will need her in the future and reminds him that her quest for justice isn't over.
4	4	"It Takes a Village"	Randy Zisk	Joseph C. Wilson	February 28, 2021	7.78
Ms. Sharpe says "Hi" as community activist Malcolm King and Crystal Gibson talk about Crystal's big date. Later that evening, Crystal finds Malcolm murdered by gang members. Robyn takes the case that is soon complicated when the murder is linked to wealthy real estate developer Robert Harrington, Sr. who also happens to be a CIA asset involved with the financing of foreign terrorists. As Dante is unable to get Kenya Bell to flip on his boss, Robyn recruits Bishop to help her infiltrate Robert's office, having already groomed his idealistic, neglected son Edwin Harrington as her inside man. Delilah, with her mother's encouragement, meets with a government official to discuss filling in a pothole; unfortunately, the official turns her down. Delilah is bitter, believing that nothing will change. Robyn and Bishop are caught trying to hack Robert's private server, leaving Edwin to confront his father. A camera planted by Robyn publicly broadcasts the whole thing, including Robert's confession, while Harry delivers the necessary evidence to Dante for an arrest. With Edwin now committed to fixing his father's wrongs, Aunt Vi and Robyn take Delilah to fill in the pothole themselves.
5	5	"The Milk Run"	Peter Leto	Keith Eisner	March 28, 2021	7.40
Bishop, i.e., The Company, assigns Robyn a "milk run" mission: retrieve Dorian Endicott, a British programmer and mathematician who has gone off the grid. Robyn is shot at, and Endicott escapes. Bishop reports the firefight to CIA Director Suri Nance. Robyn agrees to bring him in only when they promises to cancel all her debts. She finds Endicott trying to sell valuable software to Russian intelligence, but it's a fake. He says he needs the money to secure his wife and son's safety. Robyn takes him into custody, but has a run-in with Delilah and Kelly, her new stepmother. Delilah assumes her mother is on a date. Endicott explains his software can hack any digital system on Earth, and he destroyed it, knowing how dangerous it is. Recognizing she can't turn him in, Robyn calls Bishop. Bishop then informs Nance, who apprehends Endicott and seemingly assassinates him to keep him from Russian agents. Robyn collects the "dead" Endicott and sends him to Canada with his family. At home, Delilah questions what else her mother might be lying about.
6	6	"The Room Where It Happens"	Stephanie Marquardt	Zoe Robyn	April 4, 2021	6.99
Robyn is hired by Joseph Ruiz when his daughter Maya, a volunteer for mayoral candidate Sinéad Keller, tries to kill herself. Maya claims she was raped by top campaign official, Elijah Reade. Harry and Mel find footage of a dirty ex-cop turned fixer Zev Petrus chasing Maya. They quickly deduce Maya isn't Reade's only victim. Robyn gets Dante to help investigate Petrus who helped cover up Reade's crimes. Reade's lawyer Laura Foley shows up at the hospital to get Maya to sign a settlement and NDA. Delilah disobeys her mother when she helps her friend Nicki commit a robbery to steal back a necklace. Delilah escapes, but Nicki gets arrested and Robyn angrily yells at Aunt Vi in frustration. Maya agrees to the NDA, but secretly helps Mel steal copies of NDAs signed by all his victims. Keller, also Reade's victim, exposes him in public, leading to Reade's and Pestrus' arrest. Dante gets Nicki released from custody at Robyn's request. She and Delilah reconcile and Robyn agrees to invite Nicki over for dinner.
7	7	"Hunting Grounds"	Christine Moore	Joe Gazzam	May 2, 2021	7.22
Kayla Banks asks Robyn to find her roommate Nia, who was abducted days earlier. Harry finds a pattern of a ten other black women abducted and murdered. With only 48 hours on the clock, Robyn enlists Dante to find Nia. Dante's Captain, Tony Torres says, with more evidence he'll provide anything he needs, but the D.A. has made the vigilante her priority. Dante questions Deshawn Sanders who was imprisoned for one of the murders. The team discovers the murders are linked to a loan-lending company and the killer watched them from vacant apartments. Robyn and Dante suspect a company employee is responsible. Dante helps Robyn find Nia, but becomes increasingly disturbed by her violent methods. The killer snaps after losing Nia and goes to Dante's house, using him to lure Robyn. When he refuses to stand down, Mel is forced to use sniper fire. Dante, enraged that Robyn murdered a suspect, talks to D.A. Avery Grafton who is eager to put an end to Robyn's vigilantism. Dante offers to use his knowledge of Robyn to assist Grafton in her efforts.
8	8	"Lifeline"	Randy Zisk	Joseph C. Wilson	May 9, 2021	7.22
It's Lady's Night for Aunt Vi, Delilah and Nicki when Robyn gets a satphone call from Carla Henson in Les Mureaux France. Robyn recognizes her as the daughter of her deceased CIA mentor, David Henson. With armed pursuers on Carla's trail, Robyn and Harry guide Carla into hiding, and asks her to take a photo; Harry identifies an ex-Mossad operative Yossi Avraham. Robyn contacts retired British spy Allison Findlay to rescue Carla. But Allison is in the pay of the man who wants Carla. Robyn is forced to fly to France to save her. She learns David is still alive and being tortured for information; he sacrifices himself to save Carla's life. A man contacts Robyn; it's Mason Quinn, a terrorist and strategic genius whom Robyn apprehended during her CIA days, only for the agency to exchange Quinn in a prisoner swap. When Robyn discovers Bishop knew about it, she lashes out at him for lying to her. At home, Robyn is confronted by Aunt Vi about the true nature of her work. Robyn confesses the truth, and Vi warns her that one day, she'll have to do the same with Delilah.
9	9	"True Believer"	Laura Belsey	Keith Eisner	May 16, 2021	7.39
Delilah wants her mom and Aunt Vi in her TikTok video, but Vi says Kelly's got no rhythm. Robyn helps housewife Amanda Wilson with concerns about the activities of her husband Elias. Harry and Mel discover Elias joined TruthTrappers, an alt-right terrorist group. Dante's DoD contact Bo provides him McCall's 2008 Kandahar photo with her Military Intelligence "683" arm patch. McCall informs Dante they plan to blow up a bomb with the help of a dirty NYPD officer. Mel investigates Cody Beamon, CEO of Squakist, a website hosting TruthTrappers' servers. Dante tracks officer Charlie Murtaugh to a motel where he's meeting Elias, with McCall converging. Dante arrests Murtaugh; Robyn and Elias escape. Robyn captures Elias and finds there are multiple bombs. Robyn uses interrogation psychology on Elias to give the location; Hudson University International Housing. They defuse the bomb, but Dante tries arresting McCall. Upset at Dante's double-cross, she takes the officers down and walks away, "Hands up, don't shoot." With evidence, Dante charges Murtaugh, and tells D.A. Grafton he cannot arrest McCall. Robyn convinces Elias to surrender. Mel exposes Beamon, and shuts down Squakist. Worried about exposing her family, Robyn joins Delilah's video, but replaces their faces digitally.
10	10	"Reckoning"	Benny Boom	Joseph C. Wilson	May 23, 2021	7.13
While skipping school, Delilah's friend Jason falls victim to a drive-by shooting. Marcus visits his father Benjamin "Big Ben" Dante in prison, asking why he crossed the line. Ben, who knows about "that woman vigilante," says "The system was getting in the way of us getting justice..." Robyn investigates after talking with Jason's mother, Nicole. Harry ID's the real target, Alejandro Molina. The Molina cartel tells McCall that European syndicate Brigada 7 wanted their distribution network, but they rejected them, and Kostya was the shooter. McCall informs Dante, who arrests Kostya. Delilah is called to ID him; they are threatened to make their statement "go away." Dante is angry with Captain Torres about the leak. Mel and Harry find a name; McCall warns Brigada's leader Victor Shishani of "Bucharest 2012" and that his Molina war "is nothing compared to the war you just started with me." Dante provides the informant's name. Roddy Thompson reveals an inbound heroin shipment. McCall informs the Molinas. Delilah discovers her mother's photo at Dante's desk, and her hidden weapons cache. Robyn and Melody take down Brigada 7 at the docks. Dante thinks twice about their partnership. Delilah confronts her mother, "Who are you?"

=== Season 2 (2021–22) ===
No. overall	No. in season	Title	Directed by	Written by	Original release date	U.S. viewers (millions)
11	1	"Aftermath"	Solvan "Slick" Naim	Terri Edda Miller & Andrew W. Marlowe	October 10, 2021	7.67
Weeks after discovering the truth about her mother, Delilah is living with her father, Miles. McCall considers stopping her vigilantism, but Dante "hires" her; he needs something "Equalized" after bank robbers kill his partner Detective Paley and several officers. McCall enlists Bishop, who discovers the dead robber was a rogue CIA agent. Harry finds a lead to Atticus Lee, a former Marine fallen on hard times. McCall and Dante investigate. Atticus' daughter, Kelsey Lee, says they took him away. In his subway lair, Harry's computers are under attack; McCall suspects a rogue CIA agent. Dante finds a lead to Congressman Sanford Ganis chair of the House Intelligence Committee. Martin Navarro and Bishop fill in gaps; Atticus robbed Ganis' home, taking evidence of political assassination, so Ganis had his ex-CIA chief of staff, Remy Hollenbach retrieve it. Mel plants a bug so Harry, Dante, and McCall can track Hollenbach to Atticus, saving him and killing the robbers. Ganis is arrested, helping Dante get justice for his partner. Harry "hires" McCall to "resurrect" him so he can stop fearing Federal arrest for leaking military secrets. Delilah accepts who her mother is, after a stern lecture, and decides to move back home.
12	2	"The Kingdom"	Randy Zisk	Zoe Robyn	October 17, 2021	7.30
Mira Shah, the daughter of the Saudi Arabian ambassador, reaches out to McCall to ask her to find her brother, Ali, who has gone missing. She discovers that Ali was suspected of being involved with a dissident group, leading the Saudi secret service to intervene to find him. However, McCall, Harry, and Melody later learn that Ali wasn't a dissident; rather, he was in love with someone who was Reza Shaheen. Reza goes so far as to offer himself to the secret service in exchange for Ali's release, but McCall calls on Bishop, who was working with the Saudis, to do so himself. At the NYPD, Detective Ken Mallory takes over the vigilante case. Upon learning of her involvement in the Shah case, he arrives to arrest the secret service men who held Ali captive. Dante warns him that McCall is never present at arrests, except to make sure things lead to them. The Saudi secret service is not allowed to ever pursue Ali again, but Mira has to move back to Saudi Arabia, and Reza could still be exposed to the service if he maintains his claim to be "Dissident X". McCall, however, doubts this, noting he might as well have done it to protect Ali in the first place.
13	3	"Leverage"	Eric Laneuville	Keith Eisner & Erica Shelton Kodish	October 24, 2021	7.81
The mother of teenager Malik Johnson approaches McCall and tells her that her son has been acting strangely recently and is worried. McCall navigates through the DEA to get to Malik, who has been forced to deal drugs and plant a bug in a stash house owned by 6th Street Mafia leader Lamar Starks. Malik is abducted after planting the bug, but calls McCall, who has Harry trace his call. Starks later asks him to plant a bomb in a barber shop belonging to rival gang, K-Block leader Charles Simms. Simms deduces the threat, and Malik escapes at the last second with McCall coming to his aid. McCall approaches the DEA and makes a deal for them to capture both Simms and Starks, under the guise of a ceasefire. Mallory gets a hold of the meeting and has his first encounter with McCall, who orders him to cancel his reinforcements. District Attorney Avery Grafton begins to have second thoughts about handing Mallory the job of hunting down McCall. Delilah leaves Jason's funeral, disliking that other students who didn't know him claimed so in their eulogies. McCall encourages her to remember Jason by her own words, rather than verbally attacking the students. Delilah decides to deliver her eulogy via livestream.
14	4	"The People Aren't Ready"	Randy Zisk	Joseph C. Wilson	October 31, 2021	6.48
After his son, Luis, tries to kill himself while in prison for a crime he didn't commit, Hector threatens D.A. Grafton publicly, then disappears. Hector's father asks McCall to help find him before he gets into trouble. McCall tries to warn Dante, but Mallory shows up at their meet-up, and McCall has Dante arrest her to keep him out of trouble. Dante looks into Hector and comes into contact with ADA Walter Ellis, with whom he had a fight previously. With Mel and Harry's help, McCall finds out that Hector was kidnapped by the Bridgetown Gang, who are trying to kill Grafton and frame Hector for the murder. Dante and McCall find out that Ellis is actually a mole for Bridgetown, and they both race to save Hector and Grafton after Ellis kidnaps her. They succeed, and Grafton decides to let McCall go, while Mallory is reassigned elsewhere. McCall befriends a girl in lockup named Kisha Griffin and convinces her to accept court-mandated counseling rather than go to jail.
15	5	"Followers"	Mark Polish	Zoe Robyn	November 7, 2021	6.64
McCall is approached by forum admins Rachel and Abe Watkins, who believe a woman will be murdered based on her stalker's posting threatening videos. They suspect Brandon Mackey, but McCall learns that Mackey is trying to prove his innocence after receiving death threats. Harry traces the messages to an Internet café, where McCall finds Watkins withholding information. The team analyzes the video to find the victim's home and her identity as Vicki Howell. McCall calls Dante for help, and Howell is rescued, but the stalker escapes with her son. When Rachel visits the hospital, she discovers that "Howell" is in fact the stalker, while the real Howell and her son are found tied up in the basement. The stalker is identified as Amber Nelson, Howell's former friend, who envied her popularity. Nelson kidnaps Rachel to broadcast her murder online. Meanwhile, a white woman accuses Vi of assault and calls the police. Delilah shows them the video, proving Vi's innocence. Delilah offers the woman the opportunity to apologize, but when she refuses, Delilah posts the video online.
16	6	"Shooter"	Milena Govich	Joe Gazzam	November 21, 2021	6.59
McCall is approached by Dante and Grafton personally, who ask her to assist them in catching a serial sniper on the loose who seemingly targets random citizens. McCall, Mel, and Harry identify the sniper as Silas Furlong, a former Air Force sniper who was trained by the same person as Mel, Dan Erickson. Furlong makes demands for a ransom, but it's later revealed to be a trick to lure the authorities away from his actual target. Dante has the police secure Furlong's wife and daughter, while a woman is fatally injured. Furlong's daughter identifies the park they used to go to as the next target location. Mel deduces Silas's location and has a fight with him on a rooftop, and he's shot by McCall, who tracked Mel via CCTV cameras. Delilah experiences post-traumatic stress while out with a friend, and McCall resigns herself to looking after her for a while. She decides she needs professional help and enlists Bishop's help.
17	7	"When Worlds Collide"	John Terlesky	Rob Hanning	November 28, 2021	5.94
Bishop approaches McCall after his company server is hacked, aware that Harry is alive and can help him. Despite Mel's distrust, Harry helps Bishop realize the hackers were targeting a file containing information about Bishop's son, Zade. Zade is kidnapped, and Bishop and McCall find out it was by Hassan Talib, who was previously married to Zade's mother until she fled Syria with Bishop. He tells Bishop to help him escape the country, or Zade dies. Harry hacks the CIA server to help Bishop locate safehouses. McCall kills Talib, while Bishop locates Zade and rescues him, though he doesn't tell Zade he's his father. Aunt Vi is approached by a young woman who shows her one of her old paintings, but she denies it's hers. Delilah later learns that the girl in the painting was Vi's former girlfriend and that they went their separate ways. She convinces her to reach out again. As Mel tries to comfort Harry about clearing his name, his subway lair is breached. Agent, "Harry 'Keys' Keshegian, you are under arrest for espionage, theft of government documents, and disclosure of classified information." Mel is also handcuffed.
18	8	"Separated"	Neema Barnette	Erica Shelton Kodish	January 2, 2022	6.53
With Harry in prison, McCall and Bishop attempt to pull every string they can in order to have him released, but to no avail. Harry leaves instructions for Mel in order to assist McCall. Back in 2020, Alma Castillo crossed the U.S-Mexico border with her son, Pedro, but was separated from him when border police found them. A year later, she approaches McCall and Mel and asks them to find him, having last heard that he should be in New York. Dante assists them, and they learn that Pedro was sent to a home that suffered from an arson attack. At a new home, Pedro was taken away by an ICE officer and swapped names with another boy named Emmanuel, who was adopted by the Hobson family. Mel downloads ICE agent Ike Deleo's car info and learns that he frequented a garment factory. McCall searches the place and is cornered by ICE agents, whom she takes down before discovering Pedro and other captured children. He is later reunited with his mother. Bishop attempts one last shot at getting Harry released after he's due to be transferred to another prison, which proves successful.
19	9	"Bout That Life"	Eric Laneuville	Jamila Daniel	January 9, 2022	7.18
McCall is asked to re-investigate the murder of rapper Dre Bids, who was supposedly killed by his rival, Dilemma. Dilemma's wife asks McCall to look again when a new track drops, revealing details of the murder that were never public. Meanwhile, Aunt Vi gets to know Delilah's new boyfriend, Cameron. McCall gets Harry to track the song, and discovers that Dilemma was covering for his younger son, who shot Dre Bids out of fright. McCall, though, realizes Dre Bids was shot again, and someone else is the killer. Harry helps her figure out that Dre Bids' protegé, Brawlah, killed him because he was planning to end the feud with Dilemma, which would've ended his career. McCall manages to apprehend him, while Dilemma's older son finishes the truce track to continue his father's work.
20	10	"Legacy"	Yangzom Brauen	Talicia Raggs	February 27, 2022	7.18
A woman asks McCall to help recover a painting that was stolen from her grandmother's family during the Tulsa race massacre. The thieves built a shipping business with what they stole from the family, and their descendant denies having the painting. McCall enlists professional thief Jessie Cook (Jada Pinkett Smith) to assist when Harry discovers the painting is stored inside the Vault, a highly secured facility. Cook goes in for her own reasons, and they fail to recover the painting. When McCall and Mel are captured by the shipping CEO, Cook rescues them, and they return the painting and send the CEO to jail on corruption charges. Delilah opposes a friend, Vera Franks, using her grandfather's middle name in an application to a UN program, deeming it unethical because Vera is white and not Hispanic, as the middle name would imply. Vera later realises Delilah is right and decides to write an essay about what she learned from her family, and asks Delilah to help, which she accepts.
21	11	"Chinatown"	Christine Moore	Zoe Robyn	March 6, 2022	7.13
McCall is asked to look into the death of a bakery owner in Chinatown as a possible hate crime. McCall crosses paths with Ray Lai, a disgruntled ex-cop who was a friend of the owner and was also investigating her death. With Dante's help, McCall finds out about other hate crimes that have happened to Asian-Americans in the area and the suspects. Without any proof, Dante can't arrest them, and Lai decides to let himself be abducted and killed so that they will get caught. Mel saves him, and the suspects are arrested. McCall is annoyed when Delilah decides to hang out with friends instead of helping Aunt Vi make a family recipe. Delilah realizes her mistake and comes back to help Vi. McCall also helps Kisha with her community service and invites her to dinner, providing her own family as a safety net she can fall back on.
22	12	"Somewhere Over the Hudson"	John Krokidas	Rob Hanning	March 13, 2022	6.95
Bert Singer, an accountant for the Romano mafia, asks McCall to find the ledger he was trading with the FBI for witness protection. Harry tracks Bert's car to New Jersey, where it's stripped for parts by 15-year-old Jackie Fowler and sold by his dealer Floyd. Jackie lures them into a trap where Floyd's man, Wick, attempts to kill them. McCall concludes that Floyd is selling Bert's ledger, but finds Floyd dead in his apartment. Romano's goons abduct Bert, torturing him for the ledger. McCall and Jackie enlist Floyd's girlfriend, Rae, to sneak into his office to retrieve the ledger. As they try to rescue Bert, the Romano gang arrives and storms the warehouse. Jackie turns off the lights, and McCall takes out the gang. Romano stops Bert and seemingly shoots him, but he survives, having shielded himself with the ledger. Aunt Vi and Delilah foil Vi's friends from cheating at cards. Mel risks losing her close friendship with Shira by revealing that Harry has not really died.
23	13	"D.W.B."	Solvan "Slick" Naim	Joseph C. Wilson	March 20, 2022	7.08
Dante is at a gas station in fictional Gatling County when Deputies Jim Barnes and Ted Morales accost him because he matches a suspect description. When they realize he's a cop, they panic and kidnap him, which Dante's sons Kyler and Stefon witness. They call McCall as Dante taught them. McCall gets help from D.A. Avery Grafton who clerked for Judge Thomas Clemmens. Clemmens pressures Sheriff Frank Paulson to cooperate in the search for Dante. Harry and Mel figure out where Barnes and Morales took him. Having seen a previous partner get fired for wrongfully assaulting and detaining a black man named Curtis Baker, Barnes wants to kill Dante, while Morales is reluctant. Held captive with a head injury, Dante experiences flashbacks of his difficult childhood with his father Big Ben and comforting visions of his mother Carol. Mel and Harry help McCall find the place where Barnes and Morales plan to dump Dante's body. Morales gets cold feet, so Barnes knocks him out. Dante is forced to kill Barnes in self-defense, and McCall finds him. Shocked by what he has done, Dante resigns from the police force.
24	14	"Pulse"	Paul Holahan	Joe Gazzam	April 10, 2022	6.68
CIA agent Marcella Mendez calls McCall with a "code red" before being shot dead. Marcella's handler, Carter Griffin, reveals her last mission involved the defection of Chinese UN translator Chen Ying. McCall talks to Ying's UN friend and steals her bracelet, which contains an email from the Chinese Vice Premier referencing "Willow" and "Black Window." Harry and Mel stake out the airport for a person of interest, who turns out to be McCall's nemesis, Mason Quinn, and a connection is made between Quinn and an EMP attack on an airliner. McCall narrows down the location to a refinery near MacArthur Airport and heads there with Griffin. Harry determines the target airplane belongs to Bishop Security, with Bishop himself onboard. Quinn and the buyer hold McCall and Griffin captive while Harry attempts to divert Bishop's plane. Mel arrives and takes out the buyer's men while McCall and Griffin break free. Quinn escapes and warns McCall not to come after him.
25	15	"Hard Money"	Hernán Otaño	Erica Shelton Kodish	April 17, 2022	6.64
Two women, Shareen and Jenna, working at a dollar store, attempt to rob it one night, but change their minds and are witnesses to a man shooting an accomplice. Shareen is shot while they escape and Jenna calls McCall for help. Determined not to utilize hospitals to treat Shareen's injury, McCall approaches her ex-husband Dr. Miles Fulton to ask him to treat Shareen. Jenna identifies the shooter as a man working for a delivery company that frequents the store, while Harry uncovers that the man, Nick Gleeson, was involved in counterfeiting, which was masterminded by Gordon Racine and covered up as an ink incident. McCall also determines that a shop insider conspired with Gleeson, whom she confronts after Jenna is abducted. She also enlists Dante's help, who runs ballistics with an old friend on the police force, while gaining more intel from a friend in the Secret Service. McCall reaches Gleeson's location and confronts him, Racine, Brody, and Mavers. Gleeson holds Jenna hostage and lets her go as he makes an escape, but Dante manages to stop him. He later asks for Robyn's name, which she gives him. Miles' concerns about Delilah and McCall reach her home, and Delilah lies to him in order to avoid further suspicion.
26	16	"Vox Populi"	Carl Seaton	Zoe Robyn	April 24, 2022	6.94
Aunt Vi is serving as a juror in a case against Tim Colvin, a black man accused of the rape and murder of a white woman. McCall decides to look into the case after Aunt Vi says she's convinced Tim is innocent, but can't convince the other jurors. McCall can disprove a witness's statement that Tim was with the victim, but cannot present proof. Aunt Vi can cast reasonable doubt on the evidence against Tim, but faces bias from the other jurors. McCall gets Dante to help her talk to Tim, and she finds the real killer using the information he provides. At the end of the trial, Tim is acquitted after Vi deduces that the prosecutors made a mistake on the timeline of the murder, but the real killer remains free. This convinces Dante to rejoin the police force and go after the real killer.
27	17	"What Dreams May Come"	Millicent Shelton	Teleplay by : Rob Hanning; Story by : Jordan Bringert & Rob Hanning	May 8, 2022	6.46
A self-proclaimed psychic asks McCall for help because he believes his sister, Callista, is in danger. She finds out that Calista was reporting a story on activist Rosa Martinez, and suspected that a councilman was using a Serbian mob boss to put guns back on the street. The psychic is arrested by Dante in connection with an assassin found dead. The assassin was after Callista, but she killed him first. Harry, Mel, and McCall figure out that Rosa is the one putting the guns on the street just as Callista approaches her for help. She instead hands Callista over to the mob boss, Rosa's foster brother, to kill Callista. McCall and Mel save Callista, and Dante arrests Rosa and the Serbian crew. Delilah goes to see a therapist, Dr. Willa Roszak, explaining how her constant lying to her father is taking a toll on her. She eventually decides to be honest with her mother about how she feels and how worried she is about her.
28	18	"Exposed"	Eric Laneuville	Terri Edda Miller, Andrew W. Marlowe & Joseph C. Wilson	May 15, 2022	6.84
McCall goes after Omar Delgado, one of Mason Quinn's associates. With Griffin's help, McCall figures out that Quinn plans to release a dirty bomb in Manhattan. Delilah's friend Vera runs for student council president, but when her ex-boyfriend Logan releases a nude photo of her, Delilah tries to help. She goes to Dante for help, and he suggests turning to "The Equalizer." McCall puts Delilah in contact with Harry and Mel to help Vera's picture get taken down from porn sites. Harry manages to just as Delilah figures out that Vera is about to commit suicide. She and Mel are able to talk Vera down, and Dante gets the evidence necessary to arrest Logan. McCall agrees to help the CIA catch Quinn and tells Aunt Vi and Delilah that her car was hit by another vehicle. A shocked Aunt Vi and Delilah watch helplessly as McCall is abducted.

=== Season 3 (2022–23) ===
No. overall	No. in season	Title	Directed by	Written by	Original release date	U.S. viewers (millions)
29	1	"Boom"	Eric Laneuville	Joseph C. Wilson	October 2, 2022	7.10
McCall's closest associates gather in a joint effort to locate her after she was abducted by Quinn and his men. Mel goes to Carter Griffin in order to question Omar Delgado about dirty bombs Quinn has planted throughout the city. Delgado refuses to tell anything and dies of poison in his cigarette. McCall awakens in Quinn's compound, and he reveals that he will blame her for the bombs by releasing a deepfake manifesto. Dante locates the vehicle McCall was taken in, and learned the location from a goon. Harry guides him and Mel through the compound, but are too late before McCall is brought away. They manage to stop three vans with the suspected bombs, but they're empty, but McCall escapes from one of them. They also deduce that there is only one bomb as mentioned in the deepfake. Harry assists the police to remove the bomb's radioactive cylinder before Quinn detonates it. Griffin and the CIA apprehend Quinn, but McCall kills him when he attempts to kill her.
30	2	"Where There's Smoke"	Randy Zisk	Joe Gazzam	October 9, 2022	6.98
Firefighter Jeff's daughter asks McCall to help find him when he goes missing. With Mel and Harry's help, McCall discovers that Jeff and his two friends Derrick and Juan set fire to a restaurant to rob it. That restaurant belonged to notorious criminal Xavier Mannis, who kidnapped Jeff until Derrick and Juan pay him back. Derrick reveals to Dante that they stole the money because their boss, Captain Sanders, is about to lose his home due to piling medical bills from his efforts during 9/11. Juan delivers the remaining money, but Mannis ties him up with Jeff before lighting up the warehouse. McCall and Dante fight through the flames and save the firefighters. Mannis is arrested by Dante, while Harry funnels Mannis' money to pay off Sanders' debts. McCall attempts to be more transparent with Aunt Vi and Delilah, with the latter telling her to train her if she is to help her in any way.
31	3	"Gaslight"	Chris Fisher	Kim Rome	October 16, 2022	7.32
Single-mother Evelyn Weber approaches McCall about mysterious happenings in her house which she suspects stem from her recently deceased husband, Richard. Though McCall, Mel and Harry are skeptical to the initial sounds of the case, they soon discover a much larger scheme behind the mysterious happenings. Since Richard died in a cabin fire, Evelyn has been working all time around and taking in insurance claims. Richard's brother Kevin breaks into the house and claims to McCall that Evelyn had wanted Richard dead to benefit from the insurances, and that mental illness runs in her family. McCall learns that a neighbour spotted Richard's car previously, while Mel and Harry discover that he faked his death in a fraud scheme. They also deduce that Evelyn's sister, Alex Roth, was the culprit behind the mysterious happenings, along with calling in complaints to child services and tampering with Evelyn's medication. Her aim had been to take custody of Evelyn's daughter Kaylee and get together with Richard. McCall talks Alex down in a park until the police, led by Dante, arrive to arrest her.
32	4	"One Percenters"	Benny Boom	Adam Glass	October 23, 2022	6.90
McCall is approached by Storm, a member of Brooklyn Disciples, to help her boyfriend T-Bone after he is framed for gun possession. McCall, Mel and Harry discover a connection to a council election between Elijah Moore and Bob Bass, in which the former is closely associated with the Brooklyn Disciples. Bass has tried to use this connection against Moore, but the team discovers that Bass got into a brawl with T-Bone at a club, and could be personally targeting him. T-Bone takes Bass hostage at a debate to get him to confess to framing him, but Bass denies it. Harry helps McCall figure out that T-Bone was framed by Leo Day, Moore's bodyguard who wanted Bass to win the election. McCall and Mel corner Leo, and get him arrested. McCall's ex-husband Miles seeks the truth about her kidnapping and bomb involvement, but when she refuses, he threatens to take sole custody of Delilah. As a result of her heroics and help, McCall becomes an honourable member of the Brooklyn Disciples.
33	5	"Blowback"	Cheryl Dunye	Rob Hanning	November 13, 2022	6.45
The CIA apprehend Ezra Ryback in Madrid, and return him to the United States for further questioning. McCall is appointed to Ryback's security detail along with Griffin and agents Samford and Shaw. Ryback expresses paranoia about the Brigada 7 being after him and a possible mole within the agency, which proves correct after their transport motorcade is attacked. McCall has them relocate to a factory facility, where a confrontation about who is the mole ensues. With both Samford and Shaw killed in a shootout with the Brigada, McCall deduces that Griffin was the mole. She shoots him before he can pull his gun, and a CIA team arrives to take in Ryback. Ryback later reveals himself to be Colton Fisk, a senior member in the CIA; he has taken over Bishop's program, and thereby forces McCall back into the agency to work for him. Dante deals with his father being released from prison and struggles to decide whether or not to welcome him back into his life. After initially declining to train Delilah, Mel reconsiders and decides to train her without McCall's knowledge.
34	6	"A Time to Kill"	Chris Fisher	Melissa R. Byer & Treena Hancock	November 20, 2022	6.36
17-year-old Taylor Schwarz collapses and dies at a club, supposedly due to an overdose. Her mother approaches McCall, asking her to investigate and find who supplied the drugs. The drugs are revealed to contain fentanyl, while Taylor's friend Sienna didn't suffer the same setbacks. After McCall, Mel and Harry identify the drug dealer, the former discovers him dead and is wanted by the police, with the exception of Dante, who assists McCall and her team. Mel and Harry lure out the middle man and identify the supplier, Kyle Howard, but he's found dead as well. The team look back at last victims of the drugs, and discover that the real killer is former army officer Earl Reid, whose daughter also died from the drugs. McCall goes to stop Reid from killing the drug lord, Alexi Petrov. She manages to talk Reid down, but Petrov shoots Reid before McCall manages to subdue him. Reid dies from his injuries. McCall suspects that Delilah is hiding something, which Aunt Vi initially dismisses, but later sneaks out after Delilah and discovers her training with Mel.
35	7	"Paradise Lost"	Randy Zisk	Rashaan Dozier-Escalante	November 27, 2022	6.56
After popular singer Misty announces her retirement and receives hateful fan mail, her bodyguard Lucas asks McCall to investigate. Misty is nearly attacked while McCall and her team pose as reporters, and they try to find the culprit. Dante questions Misty's manager Martin after Harry finds a large payment to a hit man. Martin reveals he paid the man to go after the son of the woman who wrote Misty's hit song, but that Martin bought and claimed as his own writing. The son, Elton Smith, infiltrated Misty's circle as a band player to get revenge. McCall arrives, and she and Misty talk Elton down, revealing Misty never knew about Martin's deception. She gives Elton's mother the rightful credit during her final performance. McCall discovers Mel and Delilah's secret training after Delilah gets in trouble at school, and is furious with both of them. Aunt Vi makes McCall understand Delilah's perspective, and she agrees to some basic self-defense classes.
36	8	"He Ain't Heavy"	John Terlesky	Melissa R. Byer & Treena Hancock	February 19, 2023	5.94
Mel's brother Edison is abducted, and she goes after the driver, but he is hit by a taxi. Despite her resentment for Mel training Delilah behind her back, McCall makes Edison's rescue mission a priority. Harry discovers that 20 million dollars was transferred from Edison's company to a shell company registered in the Cayman Islands, which is owned by the Colombian mafia. Their enforcer, Jim Voss, is still after Edison, who is trying to leave town. Mel manages to reach him and brings him to safety. Edison calls their sister Ruby, and the mafia follows her, leading to a shootout and Edison being taken. Voss has him fully transfer the money sum to the mob's account, but Harry manages to halt the process while McCall and Mel enter to save him. Harry also learns that Edison's boss had set him up and he is subsequently arrested. Aunt Vi attends an art gallery with Trish and Delilah, and is offered a job after encouraging a struggling young artist.
37	9	"Second Chance"	Paul Holahan	Christopher B. Derrick	February 26, 2023	6.51
Tim Fells is approached by his former crime boss Randall Grayle, who asks him to do one last heist, which Fells is reluctant to do, but is divided on the issue when Grayle reveals that he has kidnapped his brother. Fells approaches McCall for help. McCall eventually realises that her interests for Fells collides with Dante's investigation into Grayle, but she convinces him to let him rescue Fells' brother alongside Grayle's apprehension. Mel replaces one of Grayle's goons and McCall asks Fells to fully join the heist when she is unable to save his brother the first time. During the heist, a fight escalates after Grayle blames Mel for the early police response. She struggles in a fight with one of his goons before Dante rescues her, having gone back to save her instead of capturing Grayle. Afterwards he blames McCall for their failure to capture Grayle. Aunt Vi helps Kat and Cecil with their appraiser who deliberately lowers their house price prior to their move to Florida. She lured him to her house under the pretence of a refinancing, and gives his offer to his boss, who has him fired.
38	10	"Do No Harm"	Ron Fortunato	Ashley Charbonnet & Kim Rome	March 5, 2023	6.23
Dante calls McCall to a hospital after a desperate mother, Lauren Stone, takes people hostage to save her dying daughter. Both have to deal with a hot-headed tactical team commander who wants to take Lauren out immediately. McCall gets Grafton's help to infiltrate and talk to Lauren. An angry hostage tries to shoot Lauren, but ends up shooting the surgeon who was supposed to save Lauren's daughter. Harry and Mel help McCall find another doctor who can save her. Dante realizes the commander sent someone in to kill Lauren and warns McCall, who convinces Lauren to surrender so that her daughter won't be orphaned. Aunt Vi takes Delilah to a Southern cuisine restaurant to learn about gumbo, and helps the owner re-create his late mother's dishes and preserve their heritage.
39	11	"Never Again"	Chris Fisher	Ora Yashar & Adam Glass	March 12, 2023	5.60
When Miles files for sole custody of Delilah, McCall debates giving up her work just as a deli owner asks her to look into a string of antisemitic crimes in her neighborhood. Harry and Mel step up to help while McCall deals with Miles. The case brings up painful memories for Harry, who felt abandoned by his Jewish mother after his parents divorced. Harry discovers a connection to a comic book, which leads the team to a group of neo-Nazis planning to attack a synagogue during Shabbat. They're able to thwart the attack, and the neo-Nazis are arrested by Dante. Aunt Vi confronts Miles about his petition, saying McCall can't stop what she's doing and that she's looking after Delilah, as well. Miles drops his petition, and Harry makes peace with his past after learning his mother had mental issues and couldn't take care of him.
40	12	"Lost and Found"	Tamika Miller	Joe Gazzam	March 19, 2023	6.24
McCall helps a man who claims to have woken up with no memory of who he is and a gun that's been recently fired. The team traces his movements, and discover that his name is Eric, and he's in witness protection after testifying against Rodolfo Martinez, who was released and killed Eric's father. Eric came back to get justice, and nearly got killed. The team traps Martinez, and manage to get him sent back to prison with Dante's help. McCall has Dante bring Delilah to his boxing gym, where she meets his mentor, Manny. Delilah meets another boxer, Jackson, and finds out he's being pressured into dealing. She convinces him to tell Manny, who roughs up the dealers and helps bail Jackson out of trouble.
41	13	"Patriot Game"	Geoff Shotz	Joseph C. Wilson & Rob Hanning	March 26, 2023	6.83
An employee runs to McCall after being the only survivor of a shooting massacre at his office. McCall gets a lead pointing to Colton Fisk. He tells her the assassin is connected to a CIA program called Nomad, which he shut down years before. McCall and Fisk discover that Nomad wants to get a hold of lithium mines in Nicaragua by assassinating a military general so the U.S. will invade Nicaragua. McCall and Mel are able to save the general, while Fisk eliminates the other Nomad agents. McCall confronts Fisk about originally creating Nomad, but Fisk reveals that CIA Director Platt was the one who re-started Nomad and is behind the office shooting. When McCall wants to go after Platt, Fisk says it's impossible, but Harry manages to dig up the evidence and McCall exposes it, forcing Platt to resign. Dante saves Manny's life when he is shot in a drive-by. After seeing the strained relationship between Manny and his son, Dante decides to give his father a second chance just as he's released from prison.
42	14	"No Good Deed"	Christine Moore	Vanessa K. Herron & Kim Rome	April 16, 2023	6.53
Congresswoman Elena Acevedo is murdered, and the prime suspect is Jaime Perez, a Venezuelan refugee who Acevedo let stay in her house. Jaime's wife, Marisol, asks McCall to help clear his name. With information from a man who made threats against Acevedo, McCall figures out that Lacey, Acevedo's assistant, killed her. Before Dante or the team can question her, Lacey is found dead. Harry figures out that she was killed by Congressman Walter Grey, one of Acevedo's opponents of her migrant bill. Lacey tried to bug Acevedo's home on Grey's orders, but got caught and killed her boss. McCall and Mel are able to corner Grey's men and get the proof that exonerates Jaime. Grey is arrested, and Jaime is released. Aunt Vi sees the paintings done by one of her students, Robbie, and tries to help him. Robbie admits that he's looking for his brother, Darius, who he was separated from while in foster care. With Dante's help, Aunt Vi is able to reunite the brothers. Dante tries to find out about Manny's shooting, but is stonewalled by the lead detectives of the case.
43	15	"No Way Out"	Richard Lyons	Rob Hanning & Vanessa K. Herron	April 23, 2023	6.50
McCall trains Delilah in situational awareness. Aunt Vi notices her masseuse Angie has a bruise. Angie makes excuses, but Mel and Harry find that her husband Doug's first wife was killed. Angie asks Vi for help after Doug hits their son. The team rescues Angie, but Doug finds her again. Vi pulls her gun but is unable to shoot, so McCall takes the shot. Shaken, Vi wonders if she can protect McCall and Delilah, so McCall reassures her. Mel remembers her friend who disappeared after being abused, so Harry helps find her online. Dante, frustrated that Manny's shooter hasn’t been arrested, goes after Lo-Lo himself with Jackson's help. Despite the warning from Captain Grace Watkins, Dante tracks down Lo-Lo as he is leaving town. Lo-Lo tries to escape and falls to his death. End-credits PSA: Domestic Violence affects people from all backgrounds and socio-economic levels. About 1 in 3 women and 1 in 4 men will experience some form of physical violence from an intimate partner. If you or someone you know is dealing with abuse, help is available. Visit the National Domestic Violence Hotline at www.thehotline.org or call 800-799-SAFE (7233).
44	16	"Love Hurts"	Christine Moore	Joe Gazzam & Ashley Charbonnet	May 7, 2023	6.43
Fisk tasks McCall to travel to Paris to make contact with former MI6 agent Rick Dawson, who disappeared after killing weapons dealer Diego Alcazar. Their mission is to retrieve a file of plutonium rings from landing in the wrong hands, with clues provided by a former friend of Dawson. The trail leads them to an old church, where they find a hidden hard drive. Alcazar is revealed to be alive and seeking the file as well. He takes it from them before escaping, while Fisk appears to aid McCall and Dawson as they give chase. A final confrontation takes place before Alcazar is arrested and the file secured. McCall is implied to have tricked Fisk regarding the file's new whereabouts. Delilah is accepted to start an internship at a luxury fashion store, but is disappointed to be relegated to warehouse duties due to her hair style. Delilah is shocked that her contact Stacy (another African-American girl) actually straightens her hair and enables their boss's racist actions. Aunt Vi encourages her to stand up for herself, and Delilah decides to quit the internship, but as she is leaving, her boss suddenly sees her and the two get into an argument. A customer notices this. When Delilah tries to tell her what's going on, their boss tells her she's lying. Delilah asks for Stacy's support, but she sides with her boss. Stacy later arrives at Delilah's house to apologize, but Delilah makes it clear it was too little, too late.
45	17	"Justified"	Darren Grant	Joseph C. Wilson & Rob Hanning	May 14, 2023	6.00
McCall receives an anonymous note while at lunch with Delilah and Aunt Vi that leads to a clue about her father's murder almost 30 years before. She, Harry, and Mel follow the clues and discover her father was targeted after he stood up to two young gang kids in their neighborhood. He was killed by Yancy Turner, now a major crime boss. McCall goes to confront Yancy, but Dante stops her from killing him, convincing her to let him be arrested. Yancy goes free, though, and McCall goes to get justice. Though she's outnumbered by Yancy's men, she turns the tables, and has Harry send information that reveals Yancy has been throwing his people under the bus to save himself. McCall escapes while Yancy is beaten and killed by his own men. Lo-Lo is in a coma, and Dante is being investigated. Lo-Lo wakes up, and accuses Dante of pushing him off the building. Dante's captain puts him on suspension until an investigation can clear him. In the end, Robyn returns to her garage with her father's car and cries while remembering a moment between them before his spirit thanks her for solving his death. Aunt Vi and Delilah join and comfort her.
46	18	"Eye for an Eye"	Eric Laneuville	Joseph C. Wilson & Adam Glass	May 21, 2023	6.28
McCall and her team find themselves fighting an unknown enemy when several goons attempt to abduct them. Fisk reaches out and shares his findings, which pinpoint chatter about McCall. A contact of Mel identifies the syringe found by McCall to contain a variant of truth serum, which can be fatal after 90 minutes. When Fisk is abducted, McCall and Mel go to rescue him, only to find themselves captive, and likewise does Harry and Dante. Before his abduction, Fisk identifies the group as freedom fighters he and McCall worked with in Venezuela against their regime before the CIA pulled out. Their leader, Enrique Vargas blames Fisk for betraying the group and their trust. McCall discovers that her former colleague Michelle Chambers, with whom she worked with in Venezuela; is alive and seeks revenge for being left for dead. Aunt Vi and Delilah find themselves in the midst of a robbery in a grocery store. Vi manages to talk the robber down, sympathising with his personal reasons. Delilah shields him from the cops, realising his gun is unloaded. McCall attempts a solo escape, but is swiftly recaptured and forced to watch as the room her friends are trapped in is set ablaze.

=== Season 4 (2024) ===
No. overall	No. in season	Title	Directed by	Written by	Original release date	U.S. viewers (millions)
47	1	"Truth for a Truth"	Solvan "Slick" Naim	Joseph C. Wilson & Adam Glass	February 18, 2024	6.46
McCall and her friends are saved by Bishop Security, headed by Briggs. However, they're all immediately captured by the CIA after Michelle and the rebels escape. CIA Director Greene claims Michelle is after the people in the CIA who abandoned them, but Fisk tells McCall that they're after the person who ordered the CIA to leave Venezuela: Cabinet Secretary Leland, who was trying to protect his own personal finances. McCall still tries to protect him, despite him leaving her to die. Michelle confronts her while going after Leland, but McCall prevails and Michelle is arrested. Harry sends footage to the NYPD that exonerates Dante, and he's reinstated. While Fisk is transporting Michelle's prison escort, she escapes.
48	2	"Full Throttle"	Solvan "Slick" Naim	Joseph C. Wilson	February 25, 2024	6.21
During a street race, schoolgirl Jordyn is hit by one of the vehicles and falls into a coma. McCall and Dante question stolen car parts dealer Johnny Black, while Mel tries to find Ari Bentang, the son of Sudanese diplomats who is on the spectrum. Ari is abducted after his father Sameer plots to escape the control of Prime Minister Nassir by stealing a diamond, one of the Jewels of Sudan, that was hidden in the Maserati. McCall, Mel and Dante find Grayson Kirby, dishonorably discharged from Her Majesty's Armed Forces, holding Ari hostage. Vi tries to dissuade Dee from joining the armed forces. Dante struggles with Big Ben visiting his grandchildren. McCall counsels Christine to go legit. Harry struggles with his new AI bot, Multi-modal Efficient Logistical Interface (or M.E.L. for short).
49	3	"Blind Justice"	Geoff Wing Shotz	Adam Glass	March 3, 2024	6.62
Sara Conway wants McCall to rule out suicide by subway train as the cause of death of her husband Michael, a real estate developer. Mel and Harry track down a blind homeless veteran named Clay, who may lead them to Michael's killer, and a thumb drive containing evidence of construction corruption by an Irish mob boss. Vi and Dee visit Mr. Otis, an old neighbor now living in a nursing home, who is being targeted by a credit card scammer. In the end, McCall and Mel try to help Clay get back on his feet, but he refuses and disappears back into the subway tunnels. End-credits PSA: If you are a U.S. veteran in need of support, help is just a phone call away. You are not alone. Call the Veterans Crisis Line at 988, then press 1.
50	4	"All Bets Are Off"	Solvan "Slick" Naim	Rob Hanning	March 17, 2024	6.28
Dante's old partner Vice Det. Rose Garcia goes missing during a sting operation at an illegal casino run by Blanco syndicate lieutenant Charles Benson. McCall enlists the help of a gambling addict and soon-to-be ex-convict, J.J. Cranson (Mike Epps) so she and Mel can infiltrate the club to rescue Garcia. Benson hosts some heavy hitters for a weapon demonstration. Harry fine-tunes his new AI, M.E.L. to help locate the demonstration site before Garcia is killed. Dee copes with cyberbullying after joining a peer group.
51	5	"The Whistleblower"	MJ Bassett	Joe Gazzam	March 31, 2024	6.93
Mel is attacked after hosting a veterans group, but a sniper scares them off. She and Harry both are surprised when M.E.L. reveals her older brother Matthew is the shooter. Fisk calls McCall for a debrief with CIA Director Green about rogue agent Michelle Chambers. He also says Mel's attackers are an elite, off-books unit called Red Cell. Matthew says he is a whistleblower against Red Cell. While McCall, Mel and Matthew shoot it out with Red Cell, Harry and Mel's other brother Edison follow the money online. Aunt Vi's relationship with Trish is strained by concealing McCall's activities. Dante struggles with Big Ben taking his sons to a Yankees game unsupervised.
52	6	"DOA"	Paul Holahan	Kim Rome	April 21, 2024	6.02
A poisoned Chinese MSS sleeper agent Mike Chen asks McCall for help protecting his wife Amy, and son Jack, as he believes he will soon die. As an energy sector physicist, Mike warns her that MSS is after a microscope lens used in nuclear fission nanotechnology. McCall tries to find who has the antidote, the lens, and their motive. She asks her ex-husband, Dr. Miles Fulton, to treat Mike. Mel is jealous of M.E.L.. She and Harry discuss their own bucket lists. A protest against a climate change denier turns ugly and Aunt Vi and Dee are separated in the chaos. Miles tells Robyn he wants in on her secret activities.
53	7	"Legendary"	Tamika Miller	Faythallegra Claude & Onalee Hunter Hughes	April 28, 2024	6.02
Dee's transgender friend Raya Cayman goes missing, so she asks her mother for help. They also argue over switching to a military high school. Harry discovers Raya is not the only abducted child. The team tracks them to a camp that conducts illegal conversion therapy for gender dysphoria. Vi tries to help Drake (after events in "Eye for an Eye"). Fisk gives Harry a secret task. Captain Grace Watkins warns Dante about his extracurricular police work. Big Ben's parole officer Addie Stanford contacts Dante to escort him out-of-state to a funeral.
54	8	"Condemned"	Cheryl Dunye	Joseph C. Wilson & Rob Hanning	May 5, 2024	5.85
At the St. James community festival, Aunt Vi tries maintaining her baking contest winning streak; Harry subs in as one of the judges. Miles tries reconnecting with Robyn. Dee suspects Cameron's friend Tyrese may have stolen money. Mel helps search. When confronted, Ty pulls a gun. Dante and Big Ben are ambushed by Vanetti, a Blancos mob drug dealer, on the way to the funeral of Ben's old partner, Johnny Delgado. Ben is shot, and thinking he might die, reveals a major family secret. The team races to find them before it's too late.
55	9	"The Big Take"	Millicent Shelton	Vanessa K. Herron & Onalee Hunter Hughes	May 12, 2024	5.76
Fisk alerts McCall that Venessa Lett attacked a prison transport to release a vault expert. She is a known associate of Randall Grayle (from events in "Second Chance"), who killed Dante's friend, Officer Jack Lowry. Captain Watkins again sidelines Dante after seeing him with Lowry's family. The team hatches a scheme to derail their "big take," a Queen Victoria necklace worth hundreds of millions of dollars. Aunt Vi and Dee's vacation is interrupted when a sick teen named Monique is found in their beach home. Dee suspects a case of Munchausen by proxy and tries to help Monique. M.E.L. imitates Mel's voice. Harry updates Fisk on his secret task, and Fisk leverages Harry to fly to Hungary, straining his relationship with Mel. Dante and McCall express their feelings.
56	10	"Shattered"	Darren Grant	Joe Gazzam & Rob Hanning	May 19, 2024	6.36
Captain Watkins, tired of insubordination, gives Dante an ultimatum; ride a desk or take a promotion with a Federal Task Force based out of Los Angeles. Mel is kidnapped by Eric, from her veteran support group. Fisk says Eric is really Billal Malik and his brother Imran is on an Indian terrorist watchlist. They plan to kill her, but first demand that she read a video statement about her service in Bangladesh where she killed their father Farhan. Mel delays them by promising a proper Muslim burial, using M.E.L. to relay information to the team, and requesting classified CIA access to locate his body. Fisk denies access, so Harry says he'll wipe M.E.L.'s memory afterwards. In self-preservation, M.E.L. refuses Harry’s request, so the team must save Mel by other means. Afterwards, Dante, Harry, and Mel all make some shattering choices. Dee also comes to a decision about military school.

=== Season 5 (2024–25) ===
No. overall	No. in season	Title	Directed by	Written by	Original release date	U.S. viewers (millions)
57	1	"The Lost Ones"	Geoffrey Wing Shotz	Joseph C. Wilson	October 20, 2024	4.61
McCall is asked to rescue a little girl, Randi, after her older brother Kevin steals a grocery truck filled with guns from career thug Paco Alvarez, a lieutenant for a low-level drug dealer Diego Sueño. Harry finds the truck but it's locked down in an NYPD impound lot, so McCall must improvise. Kevin is captured trying to rescue Randi himself. Just when McCall needs Harry on over-watch, Mel has a post-traumatic panic attack, calling him away. He also misses Dante's call, warning him that major cartel member Angel Salazar and his deadly crew are about to show up. McCall is captured, tortured, and nearly killed escaping. Back at home, Miles tends to her wounds, and she must admit she no longer has a team.
58	2	"Haunted Heights"	Chris Fisher	Aurora Ferlin & Joe Gazzam	October 27, 2024	5.16
McCall investigates the death of Priscilla Diaz. Her granddaughter believes it was not accidental, but rather a stalker. Residents believe the building is haunted. McCall and Harry debate Hickam's dictum versus Occam's razor. Harry sets up equipment as a "ghostbuster-buster" to debunk a theory that she was pushed down the stairs by a spirit. He finds a squatter in the attic and thinks he found the stalker, but then hallucinates a demon attacking. Mel arrives and must subdue Harry. The incident leads to both cause and motive. Dante calls McCall from L.A. for a lead in his own case against "pill king" Diablo. Aunt Vi helps Delilah prepare for senior photos, but Dee is preoccupied over Cameron. Vi talks to her friend Evelyn Rodgers about her mammogram and up-coming biopsy. Mel finally shares her own story with her veterans group.
59	3	"Just Fans"	Darren Grant	Barry O'Brien	November 3, 2024	5.13
Mel starts up a new event, "Open Mic Night! Sing. Speak. Shine." at her Haven Bar every Thursday. McCall is hired to search for Lilly, a social worker who has a hidden online presence as a content provider for an adult subscription service, Follow Hub. With a closed system, Harry must go undercover as "The Ripped Shredder" to gain access, which leads to a suspect and another missing woman, Sarah. Harry presses COO Victoria Allen, who admits to providing their home addresses to a wealthy fan. Dante struggles with being separated from his sons for his L.A. job. Dee recommends that Mel visit her therapist, Dr. Willa Roszak, who suggests kintsugi, so Mel tries her hand at songwriting as a creative way to deal with her trauma. Vi and Evelyn attend a Citizens Police Academy outreach, where Captain Curtis Martin warns not to cross the line between vigilance and vigilantism. Vi defends The Equalizer. Curtis' interest is piqued, not by Evelyn, but by Vi. Robyn and Dee encourage Vi to pursue him.
60	4	"Sacrifice"	Solvan "Slick" Naim	Rob Hanning	November 17, 2024	4.91
After Fisk's Budapest side-trip, Harry finally cracks the drive they took, which reveals a young hacker, Jason "Kaos" Smith, being forced to hack for criminals. Harry tells Fisk and McCall his own similar origin story. After a second session with Dr. Roszak, Mel has a breakthrough. Still angry at Fisk, she encourages Harry to help rescue Kaos. When she spots them in trouble, she gets back into the field. Fisk reveals he hired Kaos to infiltrate the Dragonfly Collective, a cyber-terrorist group specializing in ransomware. But now they have a crippling cyber-weapon that must be stopped. Fisk makes the ultimate sacrifice to achieve the greater good. Dante returns to NYC to check his father's condition. Big Ben wakes from his coma, but with amnesia. Dee struggles with her college entrance essay.
61	5	"Take My Life...Please!"	Richard Lyons	Vanessa K. Herron	November 24, 2024	5.14
Shauna Harris asks McCall to help determine who put a hit out on her husband Craig, a stand-up comedian. At first, he denies anyone is trying to kill him, but then admits that he himself asked for it so the insurance would cover for financial problems. Now that he's made a come-back, he tried to call off the hit, but someone is still trying to kill him. Dante talks with his mother on how to proceed with Big Ben's amnesia. Delilah is disappointed in Ivy colleges saying she "hits all the DEI boxes," so she considers HBCUs instead. Aunt Vi cannot bear to read her biopsy results, so she asks Robyn to do so. McCall tries to sort out her feelings for Dante.
62	6	"The Fight for Life"	Benny Boom	Faythallegra Claude	December 1, 2024	4.69
Andrew Banks asks McCall to find out why his sister Jenna went missing the day she was supposed to be released from Hopefield prison. Harry finds yet another missing inmate, Ciara Perry. McCall and Mel interview her parents, who say they tried every legal means to find Ciara, but after a year, received only her ashes. With no alternative, McCall and Mel go into prison undercover as inmate and C.O., respectively. Dante works with D.A. Grafton from the outside, but without luck. The team learns that lifer Bianca Silva and C.O. Darren Rigby might be involved. So McCall starts a fight with Silva and gets transferred to C Block where illegal fights are hosted for outside gamblers. Dante, backed by Federal Agents, puts a stop to a death-match between McCall and Jenna just in time. Vi and Evelyn visit Captain Curtis Martin again. Evelyn "volunteers" Vi for a self-defense exercise, and Vi accidentally slugs Curtis. Miles meets Dee's boyfriend Cameron for the first time.
63	7	"Slay Ride"	Chris Fisher	Ora Yashar & Terence Paul Winter	December 8, 2024	4.36
Christmas Eve darkens when an off-duty Dante interrupts a contract on an AUSA by shooting the hitter, Palma "La Maldad" Zambada, the daughter of a cartel boss. McCall takes a special dish to Miles at the Roy Lewis Memorial Hospital, and Marcus finally meets him. As Palma is wheeled into surgery, McCall observes six more sicarios entering the hospital with guns led by Armando Reyes. She calls Dante in time to order a code silver that locks down his ward. The sicarios blow the door, injuring Dante with shrapnel. As Miles tends to Marcus, Harry provides a way out, but Reyes threatens to kill civilian carolers. Mel arrives with "Cutie Pie," her high-powered sniper rifle that can punch through walls. As she takes out two sicarios, Miles is taken hostage and the team must rescue him. After years of awful presents, Harry gives Mel an apropos gift to compliment her new creative talents.
64	8	"Guns and Roses"	Carl Seaton	Holly Harold	February 16, 2025	3.67
A young girl, Jesse, becomes collateral damage from a stray bullet in a gang war between the Sixth Street Mafia and the Shotta Boys. Harry notes a spike in illegal gun seizures. McCall immediately suspects Angel Salazar for the influx of guns (after events in "The Lost Ones"). Mel interrogates a suspect, and Harry connects the gun to yet another military base heist. They question distribution manager Edward Thompson to intercept a stolen truck, but it's a trap. Captain Watkins again spitefully derides Dante when he uses her precinct for Federal duties, and she finally meets McCall in person. Despite differences, Dante and Watkins collaborate to question Thompson (a Baroni family accountant). They locate and seize the shipment, but Salazar escapes. Aunt Vi has an artful date with Capt. Martin. Dee and Cameron have a fender bender in her grandpa's 1970 Chevelle Super Sport. Dante quits the FTF to stay in NYC for McCall. He also reads the first of Big Ben's prison letters.
65	9	"Stolen Angel"	Pamela Romanowsky	Joe Gazzam	February 23, 2025	4.05
Faith Cooper asks McCall to search for her friend, ex-addict Maya Williams, whose pregnancy is clearly at risk after McCall and Mel find nifedipine for pre-eclampsia at her home. Drugs, money, and male associates are the first usual suspects. But they sense something more nefarious after checking into Maya's doctor and nurse, leading them to a ring of adoption fraud. Dante finally meets his half-brother James, a defense attorney, and they argue about Big Ben's care while Ben wanders away from the facility, forcing the brothers to cooperate to find him. While still grounded and stressed about college, Dee gets into it with her neighbor, "grouchy ol' Mr. Murray." Aunt Vi helps Dee see things from his perspective.
66	10	"Dirty Sexy Money"	Chris Fisher	Barry O'Brien	March 2, 2025	3.42
Andre and Marisol Espinosa ask McCall to recover their life savings after a suspicious electrical fire burns it all. McCall and Dante quickly determine the bills were marked "Unfit for Legal Tender" and the fire was to cover a robbery, including cash laundered by the Russian mob. Jimmy Talbot, a college friend of the couple's son, Niko, is found exchanging stolen Euros, and the Russians nab both of them. McCall and Dante must then rescue them. With advice from Dr. Roszak and Harry, Mel tells her parents about her PTSD, but her father just walks away. Her mother Lorna Bayani advises her. When confronted, her father recounts his own WWII story in the Philippines under the Japanese, and as a hostage of the Moro National Liberation Front. Vi is dismayed when Curtis interrogates a non-compliant suspect during a ride-along. McCall empathizes, but tries to get Vi to see the inherent danger of police work.
67	11	"Taken"	Tasha Smith	Vanessa K. Herron & Rob Hanning	March 9, 2025	4.31
Little boy Dylan Baker rides his tricycle away from his mother Francine in Queens Ridge Mall, while McCall and Dee are shopping for her prom dress. Ten minutes pass before McCall convinces the security guard to lock down the mall. McCall calls Harry to hack surveillance to look for suspicious adults. McCall and the guard check a fire exit and find Dylan's clothing. Marcus helps prepare an Amber alert. Harry and Mel spot suspicious behavior from a man photographing the play area. Dee enlists friends, social media, and fliers which provide a new lead. A shopper recognizes Dylan from the parking garage, being taken by a couple. Harry checks make, model, plates, and its emergency signal. While Vi and Curtis try to find common ground, debating "Stop-and-Frisk" versus "Observe, Protect, Connect", they agree to take another ride-along to help find Dylan. McCall and Mel catch up to the low-life druggies, who sold Dylan for $3,000. Back to square-one, McCall, Harry and Mel try to narrow the search and find the buyer.
68	12	"Trust No One"	Bola Ogun	Holly Harold & Terence Paul Winter	March 16, 2025	4.22
History professor Dr. Johan Kinkaid is shot by an intruder. His estranged daughter Ariel tells McCall that police think it was a home invasion, but she insists he was targeted. Ariel shows McCall a coded letter. While Harry and Mel dig into the professor's records, McCall meets Marcus for a breakfast date. Later, Professor Charles Radcliff says Kinkaid was trying to locate Captain William Kidd's buried treasure. Radcliff helps decode the letter, and asks if they have Kinkaid's journal. Now they suspect Ariel may be in danger. Journal clues lead Harry and Mel to Dr. Tiffany Luttrell in search of John D. Rockefeller's chessboard. They decipher Morse code leading to a library where Dante and McCall are forced to shoot a Special Forces mercenary, Aaron Drake, who was after another clue. They get a call from his leader, who demands they find the gold or they will kill Ariel. Delilah learns that Cameron has been hanging with Tyrese who wants to apologize, but Ty's little sisters Venetta and Tonya are about to be taken by social worker Ms. Howell. Dee tries to help. Aunt Vi and Dee want Marcus and his sons to visit them, but there are complications.
69	13	"A Few Good Women"	Terrence Laron Burke	Vanessa K. Herron	March 23, 2025	3.71
She's injured. She's on the run. She barely escapes. Dee receives another college rejection. Dante's FTF is called to Miami. He quits, but might have to take an undesired NYPD post. Tustin Green hires McCall to find his older sister, ordinance specialist Corporal Cass Crawford who went AWOL. Mel visits her parents, Lance and Grace, Harry checks her background, and Robyn visits an old C.O./mentor, General Franklin Knight. Knight compliments Cass as a "hard charger" doing amazing work on the Omicron Project testing new weaponry. Harry learns Cass was meeting JAG Attorney Major Deakins, but he won't risk a court martial. Harry finds her fellow soldier Sloan recently died in a "training accident." Captain Watkins flatly denies "Secret Agent Dante" a chance to return. Suspecting corruption, McCall and Mel question Colonel Strickland and Captain Thornton about Omicron. Aunt Vi advises Dee, simply "Ask" the college "Why?" McCall now suspects a different motive. Harry traces Cass' ditched phone to 2nd Lt. Angelica Brewer, and finds who supervised training, Staff Sergeant Fuentes, who provides a lead. McCall and Mel split up. Mel tries to intercept Cass' attackers. Harry finds a common denominator. They go after the perpetrator.
70	14	"The Grave Digger"	Marcus Stokes	Terence Paul Winter & Holly Harold	March 30, 2025	3.88
One year to the day after the Grave Digger was caught and jailed, another white dark-haired girl in her 20s is found dead in a plain coffin, buried alive with a small oxygen tank, and a five-pointed asterisk branded on her shoulder. A copycat serial killer is loose. Dante contacts McCall; the Grave Digger in jail won't talk to anyone else but The Equalizer who caught him. Let down from another "We regret to inform..." college letter, Dee goes out with Cameron and wants to party. But Tyrese only invited Cam and urges Dee it's not for her, being on the wrong side of town. Dee insists. Robyn suspects and questions the Grave Digger's therapist. Harry verifies the therapist is doing research and writing, very poorly, a book about the killer. He also finds money transfers to someone else visiting the Grave Digger's cell and passing coded messages. A suspect is found, but won't give up the location of his current victim, requiring Robyn to reveal a piece of her mysterious past to draw out the information. Dante and Mel question his mother, while Harry finds connections. Dee arrives home...drunk. Aunt Vi advises her. Dante and Mel race to find the woman...or a corpse.
71	15	"Deception"	Daniela Ruah	Joe Gazzam & Rob Hanning	April 13, 2025	3.82
Mel and Harry get into it, and she slaps him. Six hours earlier... Robyn deals with Dee's hangover with a bit of auto-mechanic therapy, while Aunt Vi learns about Evelyn Rodgers' new beau, Nigel Paddock. An entitled jerk triggers Mel's PTS...over a parking space. "Back off!" she yells with her gun drawn. Mel goes to her therapist, Dr. Willa Roszak; she hasn't told Harry yet. Aunt Vi, suspecting Nigel, asks Mel and Harry for help. They find Frances Esposito; Vi goes to Frances to learn more about Nigel...and tries to warn Evelyn, but it may be too late. Dee ditches Robyn at Davey's Ice Cream and disappears after receiving upsetting news on her phone. Vi calls Dante for help. ...back in the present, Mel and Harry's very public scene turns even uglier... with good reason. Vi rushes Evelyn to the hospital after she imbibes too much...with pills. Mel has another panic attack at a crucial moment, but Dante improvises in a change of plans.
72	16	"Sins of the Father"	Geoffrey Wing Shotz	Joesph C. Wilson	April 20, 2025	3.75
A man follows...two...three. They go down, but there was fourth that Elijah Reed wasn't expecting. McCall gets a satphone message from Elijah's adopted daughter, Samantha, using Bishop's old contact code. Seems they've been running. Reed went AWOL from the CIA after a bomb killed innocent civilians in the Dominican Republic. Robyn's CIA contact says they stopped looking for him. Back at Mel's, Harry finds footage of Elijah's abduction and who he might've been meeting; State Department agent Benjamin Sandridge. Robyn and Samantha find Sandridge dead. Samantha bluffs the police, posing as a detective, and finds a thumb drive. She's assaulted but drives off the attacker who they chase, finding her photo on the body. Harry digs into Elijah's missions, and finds Cardoza's photo, with the same necklace as Samantha. Sandridge's photos lead them to Elijah's location and they rescue him. They go in to get Cardoza. When found, he calls Samantha her Delphina, and she's forced to make a choice.
73	17	"Acceptance"	Darren Grant	Stephen Lyons	April 27, 2025	3.64
74	18	"Decisions"	Geoffrey Wing Shotz	Joseph C. Wilson & Rob Hanning	May 4, 2025	4.19
Officers Lazzara and Craig joke, then hear a gunshot. A man is arrested when they find the body. Dee prepares for prom, Robyn's mail has a UCLA letter, and Marcus suggests a cabin up in The Poconos. Captain Grace Watkins is pleased with Dante's work on a case as his brother, Defense Attorney James Munoz, arrives. He hires The Equalizer to clear his client of the murder. Harry tells Mel he's worried about Jason "Kaos" Smith (after events in "Sacrifice"), and confirms that Munoz's client is shady. Dee asks Mel's advice about Cameron and her UCLA acceptance. Sergeant Rogers shows the suspect's cell surveillance; Harry discovers he is Nathaniel Cromwell, international hit-man. On-scene, a homeless man with $20/$20 vision tells McCall the guy was looking for an ID card. Cameron sees Dee's UCLA letter as Aunt Vi handles a wardrobe malfunction. Mel tracks the suspect, and McCall and Dante find bomb material. Kaos helps Harry narrow the target to an international anti-terrorism event. Mel, Dante, Harry and Jason try to diffuse it, as Cromwell takes Watkins hostage. Later, Mel and Harry spot Angel Salazar in a photo with the target. In the Poconos, Salazar's men prepare to storm Marcus' and Robyn's cabin. Unfortunate Poconos hikers Duncan and Rosita are slain by Xiomara, one of Angel Salazar's Guatemalan mercenaries. Ikal asks him how to handle McCall and Dante. Salazar says, "We need the element of surprise." Gary and Glenda Thompson interrupt Marcus' and Robyn's romantic reminiscing, and help themselves to their wine. Mel and Harry try to find a connection between Salazar and the bomb (from "Acceptance"). Harry poses the question, can they stop their dangerous equalizing? Salazar's men kill Gary. Robyn and Marcus split up to save Glenda. Captain Curtis Martin visits Aunt Vi to cook for her, and asks, "Move in with me?" Dee meets her favorite author, Kara Jogunosimi whose alma mater was Howard, Dee's dream college. Dee explains she wasn't accepted after her arrest (in "DOA"); Kara asks Dee, "You're gonna let one 'No' stop you?" Leaving Dee to question, UCLA or Howard? Dante rescues Brenda, but he is captured. At the cabin, Harry fixes satellite/cell service, while Mel and Robyn spot Salazar's base of operations. They develop a plan to rescue Marcus, but he is shot. Harry stays with him, while Robyn and Mel go after Salazar. Wounded, Marcus proposes... which leaves everyone with decisions.

== Ratings ==
=== Season 1 ===
Viewership and ratings per episode of List of The Equalizer (2021 TV series) episodes
No.	Title	Air date	Rating (18–49)	Viewers (millions)	DVR (18–49)	DVR viewers (millions)	Total (18–49)	Total viewers (millions)
1	"The Equalizer"	February 7, 2021	5.1	20.40	—N/a	—N/a	—N/a	—N/a
2	"Glory"	February 14, 2021	0.9	8.21	0.6	3.64	1.6	11.86
3	"Judgment Day"	February 21, 2021	0.8	8.13	0.5	3.39	1.3	11.52
4	"It Takes a Village"	February 28, 2021	0.8	7.78	0.5	3.41	1.3	11.19
5	"The Milk Run"	March 28, 2021	0.8	7.40	0.5	3.05	1.3	10.46
6	"The Room Where It Happens"	April 4, 2021	0.7	6.99	0.5	3.13	1.2	10.12
7	"Hunting Grounds"	May 2, 2021	0.7	7.22	0.4	2.82	1.1	10.04
8	"Lifeline"	May 9, 2021	0.7	7.22	0.4	2.74	1.1	9.97
9	"True Believer"	May 16, 2021	0.7	7.39	0.4	2.67	1.1	10.05
10	"Reckoning"	May 23, 2021	0.7	7.13	0.4	2.63	1.1	9.75

=== Season 2 ===
Viewership and ratings per episode of List of The Equalizer (2021 TV series) episodes
No.	Title	Air date	Rating (18–49)	Viewers (millions)	DVR (18–49)	DVR viewers (millions)	Total (18–49)	Total viewers (millions)
1	"Aftermath"	October 10, 2021	0.8	7.67	—N/a	—N/a	—N/a	—N/a
2	"The Kingdom"	October 17, 2021	0.7	7.30	—N/a	—N/a	—N/a	—N/a
3	"Leverage"	October 24, 2021	0.8	7.81	0.3	2.61	1.1	10.42
4	"The People Aren't Ready"	October 31, 2021	0.6	6.48	—N/a	—N/a	—N/a	—N/a
5	"Followers"	November 7, 2021	0.6	6.64	—N/a	—N/a	—N/a	—N/a
6	"Shooter"	November 21, 2021	0.6	6.59	0.4	2.76	1.0	9.35
7	"When Worlds Collide"	November 28, 2021	0.5	5.94	0.3	2.95	0.8	8.89
8	"Separated"	January 2, 2022	0.5	6.53	—N/a	—N/a	—N/a	—N/a
9	"Bout That Life"	January 9, 2022	0.7	7.18	—N/a	—N/a	—N/a	—N/a
10	"Legacy"	February 27, 2022	0.6	7.18	—N/a	—N/a	—N/a	—N/a
11	"Chinatown"	March 6, 2022	0.6	7.13	0.3	2.54	0.9	9.67
12	"Somewhere Over the Hudson"	March 13, 2022	0.6	6.95	0.3	2.28	0.9	9.23
13	"D.W.B."	March 20, 2022	0.7	7.08	0.3	1.98	0.9	9.05
14	"Pulse"	April 10, 2022	0.5	6.68	0.3	2.30	0.8	8.97
15	"Hard Money"	April 17, 2022	0.6	6.64	0.3	2.30	0.8	8.93
16	"Vox Populi"	April 24, 2022	0.5	6.94	0.3	2.26	0.8	9.25
17	"What Dreams May Come"	May 8, 2022	0.6	6.46	—N/a	—N/a	—N/a	—N/a
18	"Exposed"	May 15, 2022	0.5	6.84	—N/a	—N/a	—N/a	—N/a

=== Season 3 ===
Viewership and ratings per episode of List of The Equalizer (2021 TV series) episodes
No.	Title	Air date	Rating (18–49)	Viewers (millions)	DVR (18–49)	DVR viewers (millions)	Total (18–49)	Total viewers (millions)
1	"Boom."	October 2, 2022	0.7	7.10	0.3	2.21	0.9	9.31
2	"Where There's Smoke"	October 9, 2022	0.5	6.98	0.2	1.96	0.8	8.94
3	"Better Off Dead"	October 16, 2022	0.8	7.32	0.2	1.99	1.0	9.31
4	"One Percenters"	October 23, 2022	0.5	6.90	0.2	1.81	0.7	8.71
5	"Blowback"	November 13, 2022	0.5	6.45	—N/a	—N/a	—N/a	—N/a
6	"A Time to Kill"	November 20, 2022	0.7	6.36	—N/a	—N/a	—N/a	—N/a
7	"Paradise Lost"	November 27, 2022	0.5	6.56	—N/a	—N/a	—N/a	—N/a
8	"He Ain't Heavy"	February 19, 2023	0.4	5.94	—N/a	—N/a	—N/a	—N/a
9	"Second Chance"	February 26, 2023	0.5	6.51	—N/a	—N/a	—N/a	—N/a
10	"Do No Harm"	March 5, 2023	0.4	6.23	—N/a	—N/a	—N/a	—N/a
11	"Never Again"	March 12, 2023	0.4	5.60	—N/a	—N/a	—N/a	—N/a
12	"Lost and Found"	March 19, 2023	0.5	6.24	—N/a	—N/a	—N/a	—N/a
13	"Patriot Game"	March 26, 2023	0.6	6.83	—N/a	—N/a	—N/a	—N/a
14	"No Good Deed"	April 16, 2023	0.4	6.53	—N/a	—N/a	—N/a	—N/a
15	"No Way Out"	April 23, 2023	0.4	6.50	—N/a	—N/a	—N/a	—N/a
16	"Love Hurts"	May 7, 2023	0.4	6.43	—N/a	—N/a	—N/a	—N/a
17	"Justified"	May 14, 2023	0.4	6.00	—N/a	—N/a	—N/a	—N/a
18	"Eye for an Eye"	May 21, 2023	0.5	6.28	—N/a	—N/a	—N/a	—N/a

=== Season 4 ===
Viewership and ratings per episode of List of The Equalizer (2021 TV series) episodes
No.	Title	Air date	Rating (18–49)	Viewers (millions)	DVR (18–49)	DVR viewers (millions)	Total (18–49)	Total viewers (millions)
1	"Truth for a Truth"	February 18, 2024	0.5	6.46	—N/a	—N/a	—N/a	—N/a
2	"Full Throttle"	February 25, 2024	0.4	6.21	—N/a	—N/a	—N/a	—N/a
3	"Blind Justice"	March 3, 2024	0.4	6.62	—N/a	—N/a	—N/a	—N/a
4	"All Bets Are Off"	March 17, 2024	0.5	6.28	0.1	1.77	0.6	8.05
5	"The Whistleblower"	March 31, 2024	0.6	6.93	0.1	1.71	0.8	8.65
6	"DOA"	April 21, 2024	0.4	6.02	0.1	1.72	0.5	7.74
7	"Legendary"	April 28, 2024	0.3	6.02	0.1	1.42	0.4	7.41
8	"Condemned"	May 5, 2024	0.4	5.85	0.1	1.37	0.4	7.22
9	"The Big Take"	May 12, 2024	0.4	5.76	0.2	1.61	0.5	7.38
10	"Shattered"	May 19, 2024	0.4	6.36	—N/a	—N/a	—N/a	—N/a

=== Season 5 ===
Viewership and ratings per episode of List of The Equalizer (2021 TV series) episodes
No.	Title	Air date	Rating (18–49)	Viewers (millions)	DVR (18–49)	DVR viewers (millions)	Total (18–49)	Total viewers (millions)
1	"The Lost Ones"	October 20, 2024	0.3	4.61	0.1	1.87	0.4	6.49
2	"Haunted Heights"	October 27, 2024	0.3	5.16	0.1	1.44	0.4	6.60
3	"Just Fans"	November 3, 2024	0.3	5.13	0.1	1.70	0.4	6.83
4	"Sacrifice"	November 17, 2024	0.4	4.91	0.1	1.81	0.4	6.72
5	"Take My Life...Please!"	November 24, 2024	0.3	5.14	0.1	1.53	0.4	6.67
6	"The Fight for Life"	December 1, 2024	0.3	4.69	0.1	1.56	0.4	6.25
7	"Slay Ride"	December 8, 2024	0.3	4.36	0.1	1.51	0.4	5.87
8	"Guns and Roses"	February 16, 2025	0.2	3.67	0.1	1.93	0.3	5.60
9	"Stolen Angel"	February 23, 2025	0.2	4.05	0.1	1.67	0.4	5.72
10	"Dirty Sexy Money"	March 2, 2025	0.2	3.42	0.1	1.74	0.3	5.16
11	"Taken"	March 9, 2025	0.2	4.31	0.1	1.49	0.3	5.80
12	"Trust No One"	March 16, 2025	0.2	4.22	0.1	1.85	0.3	6.07
13	"A Few Good Women"	March 23, 2025	0.2	3.71	0.1	1.40	0.3	5.11
14	"The Grave Digger"	March 30, 2025	0.2	3.88	—N/a	—N/a	—N/a	—N/a
15	"Deception"	April 13, 2025	0.2	3.82	—N/a	—N/a	—N/a	—N/a
16	"Sins of the Father"	April 20, 2025	0.2	3.75	—N/a	—N/a	—N/a	—N/a
17	"Acceptance"	April 27, 2025	0.2	3.64	—N/a	—N/a	—N/a	—N/a
18	"Decisions"	May 4, 2025	0.3	4.19	—N/a	—N/a	—N/a	—N/a
