= Dominic Fumusa =

American actor

- Fumusa in 2026
- Born: September 13, 1969 (age 57); Dane County, Wisconsin, U.S.
- Education: Lawrence University (BA); University of Illinois at Urbana–Champaign (MFA)
- Occupation: Actor
- Years active: 1998–present
- Spouse: Ilana Levine (m. 2002)
- Children: 2

Dominic Fumusa (/fəˈmuːsə/; born September 13, 1969) is an American stage and screen actor known for starring in the Showtime comedy-drama series Nurse Jackie.

== Early life ==
Fumusa was born and raised in Dane County, Wisconsin the son of Clara and Peter Fumusa, to a large family as one of 10 siblings. He graduated from McFarland High School in 1987. He earned a Bachelor of Arts degree in political science from Lawrence University and a master's degree in fine arts from the University of Illinois at Urbana–Champaign in 1994.

== Career ==
Fumusa began his acting career in the Chicago theatre scene, before moving to New York and making his Broadway debut in 1998 in a revival of Wait Until Dark opposite Marisa Tomei and Quentin Tarantino. He has originated roles on the Broadway stage in such plays as the Tony Award-winning Take Me Out and Tape. He previously had a recurring role in As the World Turns, and guest starred as Carrie Bradshaw's highly critical ex-boyfriend Jim in the episode of the HBO series Sex and the City, titled "Frenemies". He starred in the 2016 film, 13 Hours: The Secret Soldiers of Benghazi, directed by Michael Bay.

Fumusa portrays FBI Special Agent Ray Conlin in season 6 of the Showtime drama series Homeland.

== Personal life ==
He is married to stage actress Ilana Levine; they have two children. Fumusa is a convert to Judaism, the religion of his wife.

== Filmography ==
=== Film ===
| Year | Title | Role | Notes |
|---|---|---|---|
| 1999 | The Talented Mr. Ripley | Italian Boy at Rome | |
| 2002 | Asterix & Obelix: Missie Cleopatra | Obelix (voice) | |
| 2002 | The Guru | Waldo Hernandez | |
| 2005 | Dealbreaker | Stephen | |
| 2006 | Chloe's Prayer | Matthew | |
| 2006 | Grilled | Ralph | |
| 2008 | This Is a Story About Ted and Alice | Ted | |
| 2008 | Management | Stan Ball | |
| 2009 | Staten Island | Giammarino | |
| 2010 | Helena from the Wedding | Don | |
| 2012 | Allegiance | Captain Angelo | |
| 2012 | Delivering the Goods | Vinnie | |
| 2013 | Breaking the Bough | Parker | Short |
| 2015 | Focus | Jared Mikulski | |
| 2015 | Emily & Tim | Tim Hanratty | |
| 2016 | 13 Hours: The Secret Soldiers of Benghazi | John "Tig" Tiegen | |
| 2016 | One Fall | Tom Schmidt | |
| 2016 | The Wilding | George | TV movie |
| 2017 | Staring at the Sun | Detective Russo | |
| 2018 | Human Affairs | Sidney | |
| 2018 | Fourplay | Joe | |
| 2019 | The Report | CIA Director George Tenet | |
| 2021 | Making the Day | Movie Star | |
| 2021 | Sweet Girl | Sam Walker | |
| 2022 | Home | Paul Carpenter | Short |
| 2024 | Keep It Open | Tomas | Short |

=== Television ===
| Year | Title | Role | Notes |
|---|---|---|---|
| 1999 | Law & Order: Special Victims Unit | Detective Lopez | Episode: "Stalked" |
| 2000 | The Sopranos | Gregory Moltisanti | Episode: "D-Girl" |
| 2000 | Sex and the City | Jim | Episode: "Frenemies" |
| 2001 | Law & Order: Special Victims Unit | IAB Lieutenant Coates | Episode: "Paranoia" |
| 2001 | Law & Order | Scott Turner | Episode: "Prejudice" |
| 2003 | CSI: Miami | Vincent Graziano | Episode: "Forced entry" |
| 2003 | Charmed | Saleel | Episode: "Lucky Charmed" |
| 2004 | Hack | Devlin | Episode: "Double Exposure" |
| 2004 | NYPD Blue | Jerry Toback | Episode: "In Goddess We Trussed" |
| 2005 | Numb3rs | Jonas Bayle | Episode: "Identity Crisis" |
| 2005 | CSI: NY | Robert Costa | Episode: "Crime and Misdemeanor" |
| 2005 | Bones | Peter St. James | Episode: "Pilot" |
| 2008 | As the World Turns | Gray Gerard | Regular Cast |
| 2008 | Brotherhood | Father Diego | Episode: "Let Rome Into Tiber Melt" |
| 2008 | Law & Order | Tom Lupo | Episode: "Called Home" |
| 2008 | Law & Order: Special Victims Unit | Lt. Gary Rosten | Episode: "PTSD" |
| 2009 | Kings | Ethan's Cohort | Episode: "Insurrection" |
| 2009–15 | Nurse Jackie | Kevin Peyton | Main Cast |
| 2011–12 | Law & Order: Special Victims Unit | Captain Jason Harris | Episode: "Spiraling Down" & "Street Revenge" |
| 2012 | Damages | Jeff Barducci | Episode: "There's Something Wrong With Me" |
| 2012 | Person of Interest | Chris Vaughn | Episode: "The High Road" |
| 2013 | Elementary | Jordan Conroy | Episode: "Heroine" |
| 2015 | Blue Bloods | Anthony Drake | Episode: "In the Box" |
| 2016 | BrainDead | Randall Burke | Episode: "Episode #1.1" |
| 2016–17 | Homeland | FBI Special Agent Ray Conlin | Recurring Cast: Season 6 |
| 2017 | Taken | Harry Ward | Recurring Cast: Season 1 |
| 2018 | Blindspot | Gen. Peter Mahoney | Episode: "Everlasting" |
| 2018 | Goliath | Detective Keith Roman | Recurring Cast: Season 2 |
| 2018 | The Purge | Pete the Cop | Recurring Cast: Season 1 |
| 2019 | Divorce | Jeremy | Recurring Cast: Season 3 |
| 2019–23 | Godfather of Harlem | Louis Gigante | Recurring Cast: Season 1–3 |
| 2021 | The Equalizer | Detective Ken Mallory | Recurring Cast: Season 2 |
| 2023 | Justified: City Primeval | Bill Downey | Recurring Cast |
| 2024 | Elsbeth | Jack Wilson | Episode: "Toil and Trouble" |
| 2025 | Dexter: Resurrection | Detective Melvin Oliva | Main Cast |
