= Emanuela Galliussi =

Italian actress

Emanuela Galliussi (born in Udine, Italy) is an actress in Italian cinema.

Emanuela attended the drama school Accademia Nazionale D'Arte Drammatica Silvio D'Amico.

== Filmography ==
- Going Bongo
- #Screamers
