= Andrew W. Marlowe =

American screenwriter

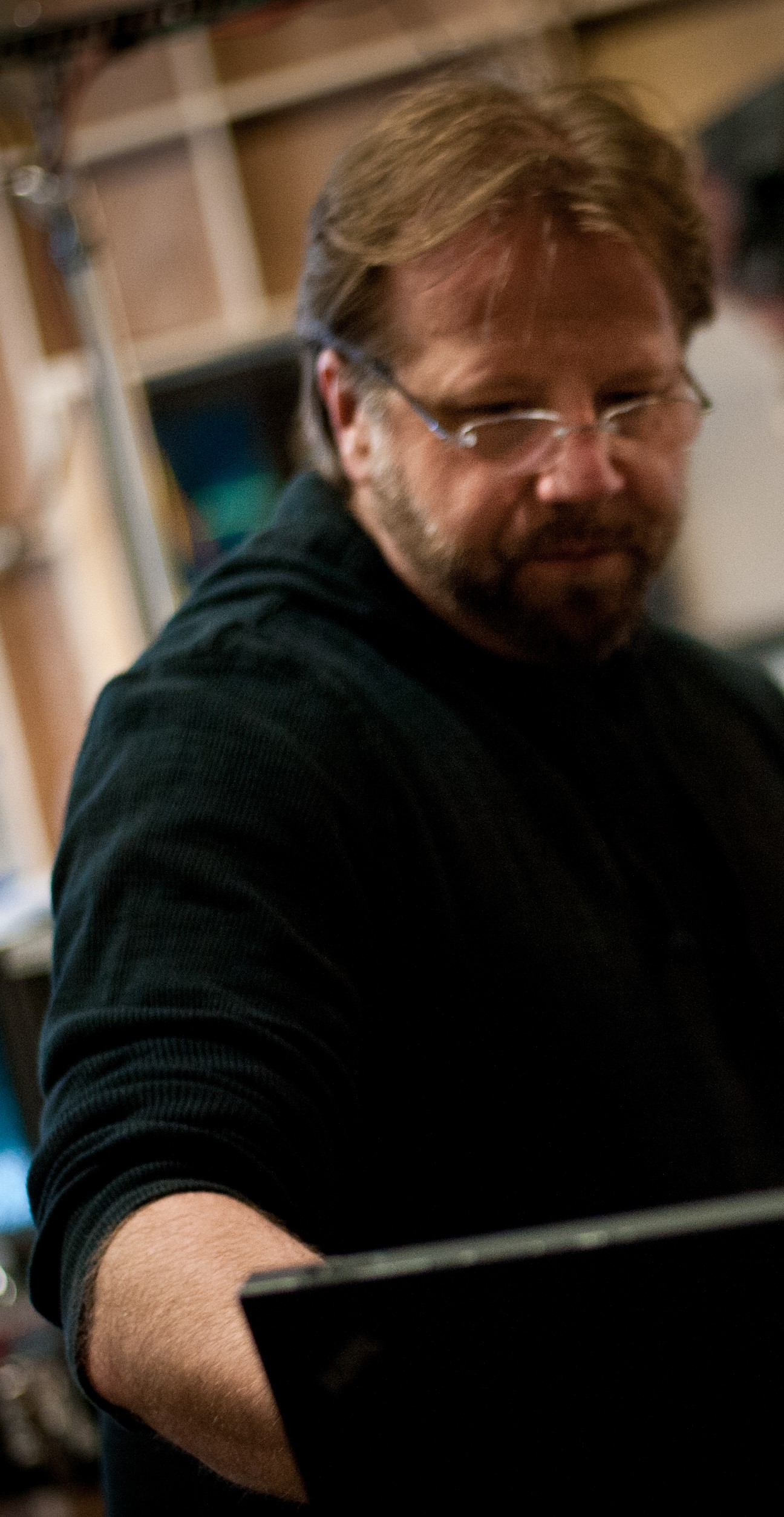
- Other name: Andrew Marlowe
- Education: Columbia University (BA); University of Southern California (MFA)
- Occupations: author, screenwriter, producer
- Spouse: Terri Edda Miller (m. 1997)

Andrew W. Marlowe is an American screenwriter, producer, and showrunner. He is best known as the creator, showrunner, and executive producer of Castle, a crime mystery dramedy that ran on ABC from 2009 to 2016 and starred Nathan Fillion in the eponymous role. He is also known as the writer of the 1997 action-thriller Air Force One starring Harrison Ford.

== Biography ==
Marlowe graduated from Columbia University in 1988 with a degree in English Literature, and attended the University of Southern California where he obtained his MFA in Screenwriting in 1992.

=== Screenwriting ===
Marlowe’s USC thesis script, The Lehigh Pirates, won him one of the prestigious Nicholl Fellowships in Screenwriting for emerging writers from the Academy of Motion Picture Arts and Science. During the Nicholl Fellowship ceremony, he was introduced to one of the other winners that year, Terri Edda Miller, who would later become his wife and collaborator.

Marlowe’s first produced screenplay was the 1997 action-thriller Air Force One which he sold as an original script to Beacon Pictures. Directed and co-produced by Wolfgang Petersen, the film was a box office success and received mostly positive critical reviews. It became the fifth highest-grossing film of 1997, earning $315.2 million worldwide. It scored the highest opening weekend for an R-rated film, a title it held for three years.

He followed up Air Force One with 1999’s action horror film End of Days, directed by Peter Hyams and starring Arnold Schwarzenegger, and the Kevin Bacon-led, Paul Verhoeven-directed thriller Hollow Man in 2000.

=== Television ===
He is the creator and executive producer of the ABC TV series Castle, which he also frequently wrote. The series ran for 173 episodes over eight seasons, with Marlowe show-running and executive producing the first seven. Over the course of its run, the show won four consecutive People’s Choice Awards for Favorite TV Crime Drama, as well as an ALMA Award, Prism Award, Imogen Award, several TV Guide Awards, and two Primetime Emmy Awards Nominations.

During the production of Castle, Marlowe and Terri Edda Miller (who also served as an Executive Producer on the show), teamed up to create MilMar Pictures. Their first project, Take Two, was ordered straight-to-series by ABC on November 16, 2017, with German RTL Group's channel VOX and French France 2 instantly joining them. The lighthearted detective procedural starred Rachel Bilson and Eddie Cibrian and ran for one season.

In November 2019, it was announced that Marlowe and Miller, in partnership with Queen Latifah, Debra Martin Chase, and Davis Entertainment, would launch a revival of the 1980s TV series The Equalizer for CBS. In January 2020, the script was ordered to pilot, with Latifah to star and Miller and Marlowe set to write, produce, and show-run the series under the MilMar Pictures banner. The reboot of The Equalizer premiered right after the 2021 Super Bowl and drew over 20 million viewers.

At the conclusion of its second season, The Equalizer received a two-season pickup from CBS. Having shepherded the production through the COVID-19 pandemic, and wanting to embody the ideals of the show, Marlowe and Miller stepped back as showrunners at the end of Season Two, stating “It’s been an honor and privilege to work with one of the most talented casts and crews in the business. Now, in the spirit of The Equalizer, it’s time to raise up other important voices who we know will carry the heart and soul of this show.” The pair continue to serve as executive producers.

=== Novels ===
Marlowe produced a series of tie-in novels for Castle, ostensibly written by the show's fictional title character (the books were initially ghost-written by Tom Straw). Heat Wave, a mystery novel published September 28, 2009 debuted at number 26 on The New York Times Best Seller list.

== Personal life ==
Marlowe lives in Los Angeles with wife and fellow screenwriter Terri Edda Miller; she has two children from her first marriage.

== Filmography ==
Film writer

- Air Force One (1997)
- End of Days (1999)
- Hollow Man (2000)

Television

Year	Title	Writer	Executive producer	Creator	Notes
1994	Viper	Yes	No	No	2 episodes
2009–2016	Castle	Yes	Yes	Yes	Wrote 21 episodes; Uncredited cameos: Award ceremony guest, Castle's neighbor
2018	Take Two	Yes	Yes	Yes	Wrote 3 episodes
2021–2025	The Equalizer	Yes	Yes	Developer	Wrote 4 episodes
