= Terri Edda Miller =

American screenwriter

- Born: May 13, 1966 (age 59)
- Occupation: Screenwriter
- Years active: 1997–present
- Spouse: Andrew W. Marlowe (m. 1997)
- Children: 2

Terri Edda Miller (sometimes Terri Miller or Terri E. Miller; born May 13, 1966) is an American screenwriter, producer, and director.

== Biography ==
Miller's first job in Hollywood was as an intern in Broadcast Standards at ABC, a network that she would return to as writer and executive producer on the crime-dramedy television series Castle. In seven seasons on the show, Miller wrote 12 episodes, including “Vampire Weekend,” “Poof, You’re Dead,” “Always,” “Cuffed,” "The Time of Our Lives," "The Wrong Stuff," and "Hollander's Woods.”

During the run of the series, Miller also handled several new-media promotions surrounding the show including live-tweeting episodes and managing the Twitter account for the show's eponymous crime writer, Richard Castle.

Miller won a Screenwriting Award in 2004 at the Nantucket Film Festival for her Short Film DysEnchanted, which starred Alexis Bledel, James Belushi, Laura Kightlinger, and Sarah Wynter and was also a hit at the 2004 Sundance Festival.

Miller also won Back East Picture Show's Grand Prize Barbato Future Filmmaker Award ("For the filmmaker who demonstrated the most all around talent in a low budget feature or short and whose talents suggest that they will blossom into one of our most celebrated filmmakers of tomorrow”) for the short film My Femme Lady. Other credits include feature and television projects with DreamWorks, Disney, and ABC, including Whit & Wisdom, Game Rules, and Bedwarmer..

Miller also won the Nicholl Fellowship award in 1992 for her script Bedwarmer. It was at the Nicholl Fellowship awards dinner that she met her husband and fellow award winner Andrew W. Marlowe. In 2013, they partnered to form MilMar Pictures. In 2016, it was announced that they would partner with Tandem Productions for Take Two, a crime procedural about an LA private investigator and an actress working together to solve cases. Previously in 2014, it was announced that Miller would executive produce a television series centered on Castle character Derrick Storm alongside Marlowe with writer Gregory Poirier.

Miller serves on the board of directors of the Young Storytellers Foundation and on the board of directors of the Writer's Guild Foundation.
