= Castle season 2 =

Castle
- Season 2
- DVD cover
- Starring: Nathan Fillion; Stana Katic; Jon Huertas; Seamus Dever; Tamala Jones; Ruben Santiago-Hudson; Molly C. Quinn; Susan Sullivan
- No. of episodes: 24

Release
- Original network: ABC
- Original release: September 21, 2009 – May 17, 2010

Season chronology
- ← Previous; Season 1 Next → Season 3

The second season of American crime-comedy-drama television series Castle was ordered on May 15, 2009, by ABC. The season aired from September 21, 2009, to May 17, 2010. The second season was originally renewed with an order of 13 episodes, but a few weeks after the season premiere, on October 20, 2009, ABC ordered a full season increasing the episode count to 24 episodes.

== Overview ==
Richard Castle (Fillion) is a famous mystery novelist who has killed off the main character (Derek Storm) in his popular book series and has writer's block. He is brought in by the NYPD for questioning regarding two copy-cat murders based on two of his novels. He is intrigued by this new window into crime and murder, and uses his connection with the mayor to charm his way into shadowing Detective Kate Beckett (Katic). Castle decides to use Beckett as his muse for Nikki Heat, the main character of his next book series. Beckett, an avid reader of Castle's books, initially disapproves of having Castle shadow her work, but later warms up and recognizes Castle as a useful resource in her team's investigations.

== Cast ==
=== Main cast ===
- Nathan Fillion as Richard Castle
- Stana Katic as Det. Kate Beckett
- Jon Huertas as Det. Javier Esposito
- Seamus Dever as Det. Kevin Ryan
- Tamala Jones as Dr. Lanie Parish
- Ruben Santiago-Hudson as Captain Roy Montgomery
- Molly C. Quinn as Alexis Castle
- Susan Sullivan as Martha Rodgers

=== Recurring cast ===
- Arye Gross as Dr. Sidney Perlmutter
- Juliana Dever as Jenny
- Michael Trucco as Det. Tom Demming

=== Guest cast ===
- Dana Delany as Special Agent Jordan Shaw
- Diana Maria Riva as Det. Roselyn Karpowski
- Phil LaMarr as Dr. Holloway
- Leonard Roberts as Special Agent Jason Avery
- Danny Nucci as Gilbert Mazzara
- John Brantley Cole Jr. as Officer Clayton Lee
- Stephen J. Cannell as himself
- Michael Connelly as himself
- Scott Paulin as Jim Beckett
- Vanessa Martinez as Lara Blanco
- Jonathan LaPaglia as John Knox
- D.B. Woodside as Lance Carlberg
- Joe Torre as himself
- Julian Sands as Teddy Farrow

== Episodes ==
| No. overall | No. in season | Title | Directed by | Written by | Original release date | Prod. code | US viewers (millions) |
|---|---|---|---|---|---|---|---|
| 11 | 1 | "Deep in Death" | Rob Bowman | Andrew W. Marlowe | September 21, 2009 | 201 | 9.27 |
Beckett is still annoyed at Castle for looking into her mother's murder against her wishes, yet Captain Montgomery forces her to chat with a reporter who is jazzed to write about her crime-solving partnership with Castle. When an insurance agent is found strangled to death and hanging in a tree, Montgomery teams Beckett with Castle once again. Their investigation takes a strange turn when armed men kidnap the body en route to the coroner, leaving Castle and Beckett to delve into the world of drug smuggling, the Russian mob and high-stakes poker in Chinatown. Castle apologizes to Beckett about his actions concerning her mother.
| 12 | 2 | "The Double Down" | Rob Bowman | David Grae | September 28, 2009 | 204 | 9.15 |
Castle and Beckett are handed the murder of a couples therapist and Ryan and Esposito are assigned to investigate the shooting death of a man found in a park. Castle makes a bet with Ryan and Esposito that he and Beckett can solve their murder first. When both investigations hit dead ends, and the victims are found to be strangely connected, the two teams work together to solve the peculiar puzzle.
| 13 | 3 | "Inventing the Girl" | Dwight Little | Moira Kirland | October 5, 2009 | 202 | 9.23 |
When Jenna McBoyd, a young, up-and-coming model is found stabbed with a strange object in a fountain, Castle and Beckett are forced to explore the cut throat world of fashion modeling. Beckett is upset with Castle about not getting an advance copy of Heat Wave before the press did.
| 14 | 4 | "Fool Me Once..." | Bryan Spicer | Alexi Hawley | October 12, 2009 | 203 | 9.77 |
Castle and Beckett investigate the murder of a con man who was killed while posing as an Arctic explorer for school children. The case takes several interesting turns, fascinating Castle and infuriating Beckett. They are tipped that the victim was actually a CIA operative and may have faked his own death, but when an old CIA contact of Castle's disputes that the victim was ever a spy, everyone wonders just who is being fooled. Meanwhile, Castle faces Alexis's wrath when she finds out he ran a background check on her violin teacher.
| 15 | 5 | "When the Bough Breaks" | John Terlesky | René Echevarria | October 19, 2009 | 205 | 9.69 |
A woman who is an illegal immigrant is found dead in a manhole, prompting Castle and Beckett to uncover a dark secret about a successful doctor, and a possible connection between his son, and that of the victim. At the same time, Castle's first book based on Beckett, Heat Wave, is released to rave reviews, and he is offered the writing opportunity of a lifetime, causing him to struggle with the fact that accepting the new gig would end his partnership with Beckett.
| 16 | 6 | "Vampire Weekend" | Karen Gaviola | Terri Miller | October 26, 2009 | 206 | 9.99 |
As Halloween approaches, Castle and Beckett are assigned to investigate the death of a college student found stabbed in the heart with a wooden stake in a graveyard. To Castle's delight, the two must delve into the world of vampires and werewolves to find the killer. Alexis cares for an egg as a science project, but her lab partner destroys it after Castle tells on her for getting drunk. The opening scene has a reference to Firefly, with Castle dressing up similar to Malcolm Reynolds (Fillion's character in Firefly) and saying he is dressed as a space cowboy. This episode also references another Fillion role (Caleb in Buffy the Vampire Slayer) when he notes "Buffy's moved to the Big Apple."
| 17 | 7 | "Famous Last Words" | Rob Bowman | Jose Molina | November 2, 2009 | 207 | 9.43 |
Castle and Beckett investigate the murder of a singer in a popular punk band whose body was arranged to resemble a scene in one of the band's music videos. When the case stumps the two, Alexis comes to their aid, using knowledge gained as a fan of the band.
| 18 | 8 | "Kill the Messenger" | Jonathan Frakes | Terence Paul Winter | November 9, 2009 | 208 | 9.82 |
The investigation into the death of a bike messenger takes a personal turn for Beckett and her colleagues when they discover that the victim was carrying evidence that could exonerate a man jailed years before by Captain Montgomery. Things get even more interesting when they discover that a wealthy candidate for the U.S. Senate from a prominent New York family may have been involved as well.
| 19 | 9 | "Love Me Dead" | Bryan Spicer | Alexi Hawley | November 16, 2009 | 209 | 10.53 |
Castle and Beckett are thrust into the world of ex-cons and escorts after a respected Assistant District Attorney is tossed off a multi-story car parking garage. Further, Castle sympathizes with the plight of a call girl connected to the case, resulting in his making promises that he and Beckett may not be able to keep. Meanwhile, Castle is concerned, and mildly hurt, when Alexis confides a secret to Beckett and not to him.
| 20 | 10 | "One Man's Treasure" | Helen Shaver | Elizabeth Davis | November 23, 2009 | 210 | 10.31 |
Castle and Beckett have their hands full looking into the death of a man whose body is found stuffed in a garbage chute when two women arrive to identify the body—one claiming to be the victim's wife, the other his fiancée. Meanwhile, Alexis volunteers at the precinct as part of a civics class project, and works to track down the owner of a packet of photos left over from a case gone cold years ago.
| 21 | 11 | "The Fifth Bullet" | John Terlesky | David Grae | December 7, 2009 | 211 | 7.80 |
A twist arises in the case of an art dealer found shot to death in his gallery when a man with amnesia arrives at the station carrying a book with a bullet lodged in it that was fired from the same gun as was used in the murder. To solve the crime, Castle and Beckett have to jog his memory and unravel a possible connection to a high-level Arabian diplomat.
| 22 | 12 | "A Rose for Everafter" | Bryan Spicer | Story by : Alexi Hawley; Teleplay by : Terri Miller & Terence Paul Winter | January 11, 2010 | 212 | 9.47 |
Castle reconnects with a former girlfriend (Alyssa Milano) on her wedding day when one of her bridesmaids is found strangled, causing sparks to fly between them once again, and Beckett to have to deal with the possibility of being jealous.
| 23 | 13 | "Sucker Punch" | Tom Wright | Will Beall | January 18, 2010 | 213 | 9.48 |
The case of the murder of an enforcer for an Irish gang takes a personal turn when Lanie and a forensic expert friend of Castle's uncover an undeniable connection between the case and Beckett's mother's unsolved murder. The trail leads to Dick Coonan, a philanthropist by day and an assassin known as "Rathborne" by night. Coonan murdered Johanna Beckett, but he takes Castle hostage and Beckett is forced to shoot him before she can learn who paid him to kill her mother.
| 24 | 14 | "The Third Man" | Rosemary Rodriguez | Terence Paul Winter | January 25, 2010 | 214 | 10.55 |
As Castle and Beckett investigate the death of a possible serial squatter mixed up in a multi-million dollar heist involving exotic animals and diamonds, Castle tries to hide from Beckett the fact that a newspaper that ranked him as one of the city's most eligible bachelors also linked them romantically. While Castle relishes the moment by agreeing to a date with a woman ranked by the newspaper as one of the city's most eligible bachelorettes, Beckett makes romantic plans of her own with Lanie's help.
| 25 | 15 | "Suicide Squeeze" | David Barrett | Jose Molina | February 8, 2010 | 215 | 9.54 |
A beloved Cuban baseball player is found beaten to death with a baseball bat, requiring Castle and Beckett to explore the high-stakes world of professional sports. Meanwhile, Alexis works to complete a family tree for school and questions Castle about his desire to know more about his own father.
| 26 | 16 | "The Mistress Always Spanks Twice" | Tom Wright | Kate Sargeant | March 8, 2010 | 216 | 9.11 |
The body of a woman covered in caramel sauce is found hanging from playground equipment in a park, prompting the team to venture into the world of bondage, fetish clubs and dominatrices.
| 27 | 17 | "Tick, Tick, Tick..." | Bryan Spicer | Moira Kirland | March 22, 2010 | 217 | 12.21 |
Beckett and Castle team up with experienced FBI Special Agent Jordan Shaw (Dana Delany) in the hunt for a serial killer with an apparent obsession for 'Nikki Heat', the character Castle based on Beckett in his best-seller Heat Wave. It soon becomes apparent that not only is Beckett jealous of Castle's admiration for Shaw and the FBI's hi-tech gadgets, but that Beckett herself could be the killer's ultimate intended victim. Castle also strikes a deal to make Heat Wave into a movie.
| 28 | 18 | "Boom!" | John Terlesky | Elizabeth Davis | March 29, 2010 | 218 | 13.86 |
After barely surviving an explosion that destroys her apartment, set by the serial killer, now identified as Scott Dunn, Beckett pushes Shaw's imposed boundaries on her involvement in the investigation, and gets herself removed from the case. But when Dunn kidnaps Shaw to get to Beckett, Beckett takes over the investigation and finds herself relying on Castle's instincts as a mystery writer to save Shaw and herself.
| 29 | 19 | "Wrapped Up in Death" | Bill Roe | Alexi Hawley | April 5, 2010 | 219 | 11.70 |
When a museum curator is found dead from having a stone gargoyle dropped on him, Beckett, Castle, and the team must answer the question of whether the killer is a jealous colleague, a jilted lover, the publicity-hungry museum director, or the curse of an ancient mummy whose tomb promises death for anyone who looks upon its face, as Castle couldn't resist doing.
| 30 | 20 | "The Late Shaft" | Bryan Spicer | David Grae | April 12, 2010 | 220 | 12.68 |
When a legendary talk show host (Tom Bergeron) is found dead after Castle appears on his show and he reveals to Castle that his life is in danger, Castle and Beckett work to piece together a timeline of his final hours that could crack the case even though it seems the victim died of natural causes. Meanwhile, Castle's fling with an actress, who is up for the part of Nikki Heat in the movie version of Heat Wave, has Beckett jealous.
| 31 | 21 | "Den of Thieves" | John Terlesky | Will Beall | April 19, 2010 | 221 | 10.39 |
An investigation into the death of a thief uncovers some painful parts of Esposito's past and results in Beckett making a connection with the handsome robbery detective, Tom Demming (Michael Trucco), assigned to help with the case.
| 32 | 22 | "Food to Die For" | Ron Underwood | Terri Miller | May 3, 2010 | 222 | 10.69 |
Castle and Beckett's investigation into the murder of a chef who recently won a reality cooking show results in her reconnecting with an old high school friend, Madison Queller, who owned the restaurant where the victim worked. While Beckett's relationship with Demming develops, Castle pursues Madison, but whether for romance or information on Beckett's past for one of his books isn't clear.
| 33 | 23 | "Overkill" | John Terlesky | René Echevarria | May 10, 2010 | 223 | 10.86 |
Beckett asks Demming to help her and Castle investigate the murder of a men's cosmetics mogul and the theft of his rare book collection, prompting the two men to fall into competition with each other to impress Beckett by proving their own theory in the death correct. As the case develops, it becomes obvious to Castle that, despite his efforts at solving the case, Beckett's relationship with Demming has gotten serious.
| 34 | 24 | "A Deadly Game" | Rob Bowman | Andrew W. Marlowe | May 17, 2010 | 224 | 10.07 |
The death of a car dealership co-owner who was involved in a simulated spy game leads Castle and Beckett to wonder where exactly the game ends and reality begins. Against this backdrop, Castle and Beckett struggle inwardly with their feelings for each other, even though Beckett is officially dating Demming and Castle is severely behind in his writing for the second Nikki Heat book. After receiving advice from family and friends, both come to separate decisions that could make or break their relationship in the future.

== DVD release ==
Castle: The Complete Second Season
| Set details | Special features | |
| 24 episodes; 1018 minutes; English (Dolby Digital 5.1 Surround); English SDH, Spanish and French subtitles | Bloopers & Mistakes; On the Set with Seamus & Jon; On Location with Nathan; Manhattan's Most Unusual Murders; Deleted Scenes | |
DVD release dates
| Region 1 | Region 2 | Region 4 |
| September 21, 2010 | April 16, 2012 | December 1, 2010 |

== Awards and nominations ==
| Award | Category | Nominee | Result | Ref. |
|---|---|---|---|---|
| Primetime Emmy Awards | Outstanding Makeup for a Single-Camera Series (Non-Prosthetic) | Castle: "Vampire Weekend" | Nominated | |
| Primetime Emmy Awards | Outstanding Hairstyling for a Single-Camera Series | Castle: "Vampire Weekend" | Nominated | |
| Primetime Emmy Awards | Outstanding Prosthetic Makeup for a Series, Limited Series, Movie, or Special | Castle: "Vampire Weekend" | Nominated | |
| Golden Reel Awards | Best Sound Editing – Short Form Music in Television | Castle: "Famous Last Words" | Nominated | |
| Golden Reel Awards | Best Sound Editing – Television Episodic | Amber Funk (music editor) | Nominated | |
| Shorty Awards | Entertainment | Castle | Nominated | |
| Shorty Awards | Entertainment | Writers of Castle | Nominated | |
| Shorty Awards | Celebrity | Nathan Fillion | Won | |
