= Ochoa =

Ochoa (Basque: Otxoa or Otsoa) is a Spanish surname of Basque origin common throughout Spain, France, the Americas, and the Philippines. It is a surname of patronymic origin; it was originally a given name in Medieval Spain.

The name originated in the Basque Country and means "the wolf", from the Basque vocabulary word otso/otxo meaning "wolf" (the suffix -a in the Basque language represents the definite article). In Standard Basque, the name is spelled otsoa or otxoa. There was also a female given name Ochanda (meaning "female wolf", cf. the elegant tower in the old quarter of Vitoria-Gasteiz named after Ochanda, proper name of the daughter of a man responsible for revamping the tower in the 16th century) and Ochotorena or Otxotorena, meaning "son of Ochoto" (literally "small wolf"). The Spanish equivalent of this Basque given name was Lope, also appearing in the names of Gascon lords in the High Middle Ages.

== Geographical distribution ==
As of 2014, 32.2% of all known bearers of the surname Ochoa were residents of Mexico (frequency 1:671), 12.1% of Colombia (1:686), 11.8% of the United States (1:5,302), 9.4% of Venezuela (1:556), 5.8% of Peru (1:949), 5.1% of Guatemala (1:547), 4.8% of Argentina (1:1,537), 4.8% of Ecuador (1:580), 3.1% of Honduras (1:492), 2.5% of Spain (1:3,191), 1.6% of Nicaragua (1:651), 1.4% of Cuba (1:1,390), 1.4% of Bolivia (1:1,286) and 1.3% of El Salvador (1:861).

In Spain, the frequency of the surname was higher than national average (1:3,191) in the following autonomous communities:

1. La Rioja (1:310)
2. Navarre (1:438)
3. Basque Country (1:1,261)
4. Cantabria (1:1,963)
5. Aragon (1:2,024)
6. Castilla-La Mancha (1:2,573)
7. Community of Madrid (1:2,933)

In Honduras, the frequency of the surname was higher than national average (1:492) in the following departments:

1. Choluteca (1:147)
2. Francisco Morazán (1:309)
3. Olancho (1:370)
4. Valle (1:427)

== People ==
- Alex Ochoa (born 1972), American baseball player
- Arnaldo Ochoa (1930–1989), Cuban army general, executed for treason
- Baltazar Hinojosa Ochoa (born 1963), Mexican politician, mayor of Matamoros, Tamaulipas
- Blake Ochoa (born 1985), Venezuelan baseball player
- Blanca Fernández Ochoa (1963–2019), Spanish alpine skier
- Carla Ochoa (born 1979), Chilean fashion model
- Carlos Ochoa (born 1978), Mexican football (soccer) player
- Carlos José Ochoa (born 1980), Venezuelan cyclist
- Carlos M. Ochoa (1920–2008), Peruvian botanist
- Digna Ochoa (1964–2001), Mexican human-rights lawyer
- Dominic Ochoa (born 1974), Filipino actor
- Annabelle Lopez Ochoa (born 1973), Belgian dance choreographer
- Eduardo López Ochoa (1877–1936), Spanish army general, Africanist, and Freemason
- Eduardo M. Ochoa (born 1950), Argentine-American university president
- Eliades Ochoa (born 1946), Cuban guitarist and singer
- Ellen Ochoa (born 1958), first Mexican-American astronaut
- Estevan Ochoa (1831–1888), Mexican-born American businessman and politician
- Eugenio de Ochoa (1815–1872), Spanish author and translator
- Fabio Ochoa Restrepo (a.k.a. "Don Fabio") (1923–2002), Colombian businessman, father of the Ochoa brothers
- Francisco Fernández Ochoa (1950–2006), Spanish alpine skier
- Francisco Labastida Ochoa (born 1942), Mexican economist and politician
- Gabriel Ochoa Uribe (1929–2020), Colombian football player
- Gabriela Ochoa, Venezuelan British computer scientist
- Gilda Ochoa, American professor
- Gorka Otxoa (born 1979), Spanish actor
- Guillermo Ochoa (a.k.a. "Paco Memo") (born 1985), Mexican football (soccer) player
- Israel Ochoa (born 1964), Colombian cyclist
- Jesús Ochoa (footballer) (born 1981), Mexican-American football (soccer) player
- Jesús Ochoa (born 1959), Mexican actor
- Ochoa brothers, Colombian brothers Jorge, Juan David and Fabio Ochoa, former members of the Medellín drug cartel
- Laura Lee Ochoa (born 1986), Bassist and Founder of Khruangbin.
- Leire Martínez Ochoa (born 1979), Spanish-Basque singer, vocalist of La Oreja de Van Gogh after Amaia Montero's departure
- Leonorilda Ochoa (1939–2016), Mexican actress
- Lorena Ochoa (born 1981), Mexican golfer
- Manuel Ochoa (1925–2006), Exiled Cuban musician and conductor, founder of the Miami Symphony Orchestra
- Manuel López Ochoa (1933–2011), Mexican actor
- Mariana Ochoa (born 1979), Mexican actress and singer
- Paquito Ochoa, Jr. (born 1960), Filipino lawyer and politician
- Raymond Ochoa (born 2001), American actor
- Richard Ochoa (born 1984), Venezuelan track and road cyclist
- Ryan Ochoa (born 1996), American actor
- Samuel Ochoa (born 1986), Mexican football (soccer) player
- Severo Ochoa (1905–1993), Spanish biochemist, Nobel Laureate, Medicine, 1959
- Sigifredo Ochoa (1942–2023), Salvadoran military officer and politician
- Víctor Manuel Ochoa Cadavid (1962–2025), Colombian Roman Catholic bishop

== Fictional characters ==
- Pablo Belisario Ochoa, one of the five genetic fathers of Agent 47 in the Hitman video game series
- Detective Miguel Ochoa, character in the Nikki Heat novels based on Castle character Detective Javier Esposito
- Tony Ochoa, Mexican-American character played by Jacob Vargas in the Netflix series Mr Iglesias
- Maritza Ochoa, American Girl character
- Inspector Frank Ochoa, NYPD officer in the 1974 film Death Wish, played by Italian-American actor Vincent Gardenia

== Other ==
- Ochoa syndrome, rare congenital syndrome associated with facial expressions and hydronephrosis
- OTXO, 2023 roguelike videogame made by Lateralis Heavy Industries and published by Super Rare Originals
