= Castle season 3 =

Castle
- Season 3
- DVD cover
- Starring: Nathan Fillion; Stana Katic; Jon Huertas; Seamus Dever; Tamala Jones; Ruben Santiago-Hudson; Molly C. Quinn; Susan Sullivan
- No. of episodes: 24

Release
- Original network: ABC
- Original release: September 20, 2010 – May 16, 2011

Season chronology
- ← Previous; Season 2 Next → Season 4

The third season of American crime-comedy-drama television series Castle was ordered on March 30, 2010, by ABC. The season aired from September 20, 2010, to May 16, 2011. The third season was originally ordered with a 22 episode count, but ABC extended the order to 24 episodes on November 11, 2010.

== Overview ==
Richard Castle (Fillion) is a famous mystery novelist who has killed off the main character in his popular book series and has writer's block. He is brought in by the NYPD for questioning regarding a copy-cat murder based on one of his novels. He is intrigued by this new window into crime and murder, and uses his connection with the mayor to charm his way into shadowing Detective Kate Beckett (Katic). Castle decides to use Beckett as his muse for Nikki Heat, the main character of his next book series. Beckett, an avid reader of Castle's books, initially disapproves of having Castle shadow her work, but later warms up and recognizes Castle as a useful resource in her team's investigations.

== Cast ==
=== Main cast ===
- Nathan Fillion as Richard Castle
- Stana Katic as Det. Kate Beckett
- Jon Huertas as Det. Javier Esposito
- Seamus Dever as Det. Kevin Ryan
- Tamala Jones as Dr. Lanie Parish
- Ruben Santiago-Hudson as Captain Roy Montgomery
- Molly C. Quinn as Alexis Castle
- Susan Sullivan as Martha Rodgers

=== Recurring cast ===
- Victor Webster as Josh Davidson
- Ken Baumann as Ashley Linden
- Jason Beghe as Mike Royce
- Scott Paulin as Jim Beckett
- Max Martini as Hal Lockwood
- Adrian Pasdar as Mark Fallon
- Brian Goodman as Gary McCallister
- Lochlyn Munro as Kevin McCann
- Judith Scott as Evelyn Montgomery
- Arye Gross as Sidney Perlmutter
- Juliana Dever as Jenny O'Malley

== Episodes ==
No. overall	No. in season	Title	Directed by	Written by	Original release date	Prod. code	US viewers (millions)
35	1	"A Deadly Affair"	Rob Bowman	Andrew W. Marlowe	September 20, 2010	301	10.70
Beckett and her team burst into an apartment on a murderer's trail, only to be surprised when they find Castle, whom they had not seen or heard from in months, standing over the dead woman's body holding a gun. Beckett has no choice but to arrest Castle until he proves he is innocent.
36	2	"He's Dead, She's Dead"	John Terlesky	Moira Kirland	September 27, 2010	303	11.08
Beckett and Castle look for a killer of a famous psychic while debating whether extrasensory abilities are real or fake. But, when a letter arrives from the victim predicting her death, they must determine who actually wrote the letter, the victim or the killer.
37	3	"Under the Gun"	Bryan Spicer	Alexi Hawley	October 4, 2010	302	10.83
While investigating the murder of a bail bondsman, Beckett and Castle run into Beckett's first Training Officer, Mike Royce, now working as a bounty hunter and chasing their murder suspect on a warrant for missing his court appearance.
38	4	"Punked"	Rob Bowman	David Grae	October 11, 2010	304	10.66
Beckett and Castle investigate a murder of a young mathematician gunned down by a 200-year-old bullet, and Castle thinks that it might be a time-traveling murderer, but the trail leads to New York's secret steampunk society subculture involving antique guns. Later, a new romance in Beckett's life is revealed.
39	5	"Anatomy of a Murder"	John Terlesky	Terence Paul Winter	October 18, 2010	305	10.95
When a County Hospital doctor's body is discovered in someone else's casket, Castle and Beckett dive into the complex relationships in the hospital and the doctor's life to uncover the killer. Meanwhile, Castle's relationship with his ex-wife is strained over a pair of concert tickets.
40	6	"3XK"	Bill Roe	David Amann	October 25, 2010	307	11.32
When a woman's dead body shows signs of an old killer's handiwork, Castle and Beckett discover that the Triple Killer, a murderer who vanished four years previously, may have returned. Meanwhile, Castle alternately encourages and discourages Alexis' involvement with a secret admirer.
41	7	"Almost Famous"	Félix Alcalá	Elizabeth Davis	November 1, 2010	306	11.27
Responding to a call of "Officer Down", Castle and Beckett find that the murdered "officer" is actually a male stripper wearing a police costume, and their investigation takes them into the world of male strip clubs and the price that people pay in pursuit of fame.
42	8	"Murder Most Fowl"	Bryan Spicer	Matt Pyken	November 8, 2010	308	10.83
Beckett and Castle discover the brutal kidnapping of a boy while investigating the shooting death of a subway worker in Central Park, and the team works overtime to bring a murderer to justice and save innocent lives that hang in the balance. Meanwhile, Alexis plays pet-sitter for an aged rat.
43	9	"Close Encounters of the Murderous Kind"	Bethany Rooney	Shalisha Francis	November 15, 2010	309	9.98
When a prominent astrophysicist is found dead in her car of explosive decompression, Castle is led to theorize her death was the result of an alien abduction, particularly when a government agent (Lyle Lovett) tries to stop the investigation.
44	10	"Last Call"	Bryan Spicer	Scott Williams	December 6, 2010	310	7.63
Castle and Beckett investigate the murder of a dockworker turned bar owner whose body is found floating in the East River, leading to the discovery of a secret that dates back to Prohibition.
45	11	"Nikki Heat"	Jeff Bleckner	David Grae	January 3, 2011	312	9.61
Natalie Rhodes (Laura Prepon), playing Nikki Heat in the film adaptation of Heat Wave, joins Castle and Beckett in their next investigation of a high class match-maker, Stacy Collins. Natalie goes to extremes during her "character research," making herself into the exact image of Beckett, much to Castle's delight and Beckett's dismay. Ryan tries to find the best way to propose to Jenny.
46	12	"Poof! You're Dead"	Millicent Shelton	Terri Miller	January 10, 2011	311	9.05
Beckett and Castle are called to a historic magic shop, one of their childhood hotspots, to investigate the murder of the owner, found suspended upside down in a tank of water. The trail leads back to a money-laundering scheme and an investigation into a questionable billionaire who was supposedly killed when his plane exploded over the Atlantic. Meanwhile, Lanie and Esposito try to keep a secret from the rest of the 12th Precinct and Castle struggles with his feelings for his ex-wife Gina.
47	13	"Knockdown"	Tom Wright	Will Beall	January 24, 2011	313	9.08
When John Raglan, the detective who investigated Beckett's mother's murder is shot before her eyes before he can give her new evidence in the case, Beckett's old wounds are reopened. Raglan's partner, Gary McAllister directs Beckett to heroin dealer Vulcan Simmons. While being interrogated by Beckett, Simmons hints to knowing Johanna but declines being involved in her death. The investigation of Raglan's assassination leads the team to a group of three corrupt cops (including McAllister and Raglan) who were kidnapping mobsters for ransom until they accidentally shot and killed an undercover FBI agent. Johanna Beckett discovered the scheme while researching an appeal on behalf of the mobster who was charged with the death of the dead agent. McAllister and Raglan's assassin are arrested. Before being imprisoned, McAllister warns the team that they have "awakened The Dragon."
48	14	"Lucky Stiff"	Emile Levisetti	Alexi Hawley	February 7, 2011	314	9.26
Castle and Beckett are called to look into the murder of a winner of 117 million dollars in the lottery who was found dead in his apartment and the safe containing his winnings empty. As they look into the victim's past spending and charity, they discover he was trying to make up for the mistakes he made. Martha meanwhile has inherited a million dollars from her former partner Chet and wants to find some way to honor his memory.
49	15	"The Final Nail"	John Terlesky	Moira Kirland	February 14, 2011	315	8.75
Beckett and Castle are called to investigate the murder of a wealthy woman, killed by a nail gun. Castle went to boarding school with the victim's husband, Damien Westlake (Jason Wiles). While Beckett considers Castle's old friend the prime suspect, Castle disagrees. Their investigation leads them to a cold case: the murder of Philip Westlake (Damien's father) that occurred two decades ago.
50	16	"Setup"	Rob Bowman	David Amann	February 21, 2011	316	8.99
Castle and Beckett investigate the murder of a New York taxi driver who was shot to death, and his taxi stripped of its parts. As they search for his killer, they are led to a storage unit with trace amounts of radioactive material and evidence that there may be a terrorist group building a dirty bomb. Beckett and the squad must cooperate with a ruthless Homeland Security agent Mark Fallon (Adrian Pasdar), but Castle senses that they have been set up. As Castle and Beckett close in on a suspect, they are trapped in a freezer while a nuclear device is loose in the city.
51	17	"Countdown"	Bill Roe	Andrew W. Marlowe	February 28, 2011	317	10.11
Castle and Beckett remain trapped in the frozen storage container while the NYPD and the Department of Homeland Security continue to search for the dirty bomb. Alexis' worried call finally results in help arriving, including Beckett's boyfriend, Josh. Now back on the task force, Beckett and Castle team up with Homeland Security, to follow the trail of domestic terrorists.
52	18	"One Life to Lose"	David M. Barrett	Elizabeth Davis	March 21, 2011	318	12.03
When Sarah Cutler, the head writer on one of New York's longest running soap operas to which Martha is a devoted fan, is killed with a fire axe, Castle and Beckett quickly discover behind the scenes drama just as scandalous as the fictitious storylines, and most would kill to get ahead.
53	19	"Law & Murder"	Jeff Bleckner	Terence Paul Winter	March 28, 2011	319	12.56
During the trial of a murdered socialite, a juror falls dead from cyanide poisoning. Suspect number one is the defendant of the trial, having an accomplice poison the juror's coffee within the courthouse. But when Castle and Beckett discover that the victim was poisoned long before he reached the courthouse, they begin to follow a trail that involves the victim buying his way into the trial and his connection to the case being presented in the courtroom.
54	20	"Slice of Death"	Steve Boyum	Scott Williams	April 4, 2011	320	11.45
When a reporter is found stabbed to death and cooked inside a pizza oven, Castle and Beckett try to determine why he was murdered. They hunt a trail of suspects working for franchises with very similar names. Meanwhile, Alexis has problems to cope with when a "friend" tries to steal her boyfriend.
55	21	"The Dead Pool"	Paul Holahan	Matt Pyken	April 11, 2011	321	12.33
When a future Olympic swimmer is found dead in the pool, Castle and Beckett travel into the world of sports, drugs, and drug dealers.
56	22	"To Love and Die in L.A."	John Terlesky	Alexi Hawley	May 2, 2011	322	12.11
Against orders, Beckett travels to Los Angeles while investigating the murder of her training officer Michael Royce, last seen being arrested in the episode "Under the Gun"; Castle questions Beckett's motives.
57	23	"Pretty Dead"	Jeff Bleckner	Terri Miller	May 9, 2011	323	12.60
Castle and Beckett are called to investigate when Amber Middleberry, a contestant in a beauty pageant, is found strangled and every suspect has a motive to commit murder.
58	24	"Knockout"	Rob Bowman	Will Beall	May 16, 2011	324	12.93
An assassin with knowledge of the details behind Beckett's mother's murder escapes from custody during his arraignment, leaving Castle and Beckett to track him down. Secrets are revealed about Captain Montgomery's past as the third cop. Montgomery leaves evidence of his involvement with a powerful outside party in the case for Beckett, before confronting the assassins. He is shot and killed in the process. At Montgomery's funeral, Beckett is shot in the chest by a sniper. Castle tells her that he loves her as he holds her in his arms just before her eyes close.

== Reception ==
=== Critical reception ===
The third season of Castle received mixed to positive reviews from critics. The season received a 60% fresh rating on Rotten Tomatoes, based on 5 reviews. Courtney Morrison from TV Fanatic praised the season finale, calling it "easily one of the best Castle episodes yet" and was impressed over the entire cast in the episode. However, the third season was criticized for being too average. The A.V. Club reviewer called the show "This is a cute piece of work that coasts largely on the charms of its cast". Michael Crider from Screenrant was also negative towards the show's premise as he said "Without the light-hearted and even flirty back-and-forth, there’s not a whole lot to distinguish Castle from any mystery made in the last twenty years".

== DVD release ==
Castle: The Complete Third Season
Set details	Special features	
24 episodes; 946 minutes; English (Dolby Digital 5.1 Surround); English SDH, Spanish and French subtitles	Bloopers & Mistakes; Following A Good Lead; Castle Goes Hollywood; Interrogation Room (Cast And Crew Interviews); Audio Commentary; Deleted Scenes	
DVD release dates
Region 1	Region 2	Region 4
September 20, 2011	August 6, 2012	October 12, 2011

== Awards and nominations ==
Award	Category	Nominee	Result	Ref.
TV Guide Magazine's Fan Favorites Awards	Favorite Couple Who Should	Nathan Fillion and Stana Katic	Won	
TV Guide Magazine's Fan Favorites Awards	Favorite Drama Series	Castle	Won	
Shorty Awards	Best Actor	Nathan Fillion	Nominated	
Shorty Awards	Writer	Richard Castle	Nominated	
Shorty Awards	Best Actress	Stana Katic	Won	
