= Tick, Tick, Tick... (Castle) =

- Castle episode
- Episode no.: Season 2 Episode 17
- Directed by: Bryan Spicer
- Written by: Moira Kirland
- Original air date: March 22, 2010

Guest appearances
- Dana Delany as Jordan Shaw; Dameon Clarke as The Killer; Andrew Rothenberg as Donald Salt; Barbara Anne Klein as Sandra Keller; Nicholas Patitucci as Benjamin Conrad

Episode chronology
← Previous "The Mistress Always Spanks Twice"	Next → "Boom!"
- Castle (season 2)

"Tick, Tick, Tick..." is the 27th episode of Castle and the first of a two-part story, concluding with the following episode, "Boom!". It is the 17th episode of the second season. The episode was written by Moira Kirland and directed by Bryan Spicer. It aired on March 22, 2010 on ABC. In the episode, Rick Castle (Nathan Fillion) and Kate Beckett (Stana Katić) must team up with the FBI to track down a killer (Dameon Clarke) using one of Castle's books as inspiration.

== Plot ==
Kate Beckett gets a call from a man who asks for "Nikki" and claims he has committed a murder. Alex Peterman, a personal attorney, is found shot to death at Grand Central Terminal. Five bullets are found at the crime scene, each one with a letter etched into it, together spelling "Nikki". The murderer is calling out Nikki Heat, which is the main character from one of Rick Castle's fiction novels and based on Beckett. The killer phones Beckett, telling her that he has again killed. This time, the body is found in the Central Park carousel, and the letters on the bullets left behind spell "will". The team discovers that the killer is trying to send a message.

FBI agents arrive at the second murder scene and announce that this is now their investigation, Agent Jordan Shaw (Dana Delany) being the lead investigator. Michelle Lewis, a dog walker, is identified as the second victim. The FBI waste no time in making themselves at home in the precinct, quickly moving in their equipment required for the "war room". Castle is impressed by Shaw and her equipment, but Beckett is annoyed by her. The team manages to get a print off of Lewis' purse, which matches a man by the name of Donald Salt (Andrew Rothenberg), who is on parole. When the team goes to arrest Salt, Castle is ordered to stay in the car. Salt tries to run from the police, making a mistake by going straight past the car where Castle is hidden inside. Stepping out quickly, the author stuns the fugitive with a high voltage taser gun, found in special Agent Shaw's SUV.

In interrogation, Beckett realizes that Salt is wearing a bandage on one of his hands and he informs her that he sold his pinky finger online to the real killer. The bandage has a string of numbers written on it. After pondering about the numbers' meaning, Castle discovers that they correspond to page numbers and words in his novel, Heat Wave. The message for the team says, "I will kill someone else before midnight tonight unless you stop me." Sadly, the given deadline arrives, with the detectives still having no idea of who the next victim is or where the murder will take place. Disappointed, the psychopath contacts Kate once again, testing her, tempting her, and further angering her. The FBI traces the call to a parking garage. When they arrive, they find blood, a woman's shoe, some strands of hair, and four shell casings. The only thing missing is the body, which was put in the trunk of a waiting and stolen vehicle.

Castle spends the night on Beckett's couch. When he wakes up the next morning, the body missing from the parking garage is found outside her front door. Bullets from this body read "burn". The killer's message is complete: "Nikki will burn." The third body is identified as taxidermist Sandra Keller (Barbara Anne Klein). The team finds the connections between the bodies. The killer was walking his dog when the second victim was walking a Rottweiler. The Rottweiler attacked and killed the other dog. The dog was sent to a taxidermist, but the killer didn't have enough money to pay for it. The taxidermist was robbed and formaldehyde was taken from the shop. The dead lawyer had been asked to take the case of the dead dog but declined. The client's name was Benjamin Conrad (Nicholas Patitucci).

The FBI team is set up to arrest Conrad when Beckett gets yet another call from their perpetrator. Through a window, she sees him with a gun in his left hand and a cellphone in his right. He disappears from view and a gunshot is heard. The formaldehyde that Conrad had stolen was being used to make cyclonite, a highly explosive element. With that, they found a recording of the killer's voice, repeating the words "Goodbye, Nikki". The recording was meant to activate about 5–10 seconds before a bomb would explode and kill detective Beckett. At his apartment, Castle looks over the crime scene pictures. He realizes that in the pictures Conrad's gun was in his right hand. However, the man in the window was left handed indicating Conrad was killed by the man in the window and the real killer is still on the loose, leading him to realize that Beckett is still in danger. Castle leaves his house and calls Beckett to warn her, but she is in the shower. When she finally answers, Castle is seen running towards her apartment and tells her that Conrad isn't the killer. While on the phone, Castle hears the "Goodbye, Nikki" recording seconds before arriving at her building and then witnessing Beckett's apartment explode. He takes cover from the blast and flying glass, looking up in horror to see the apartment on fire.

== Production ==
Dana Delany spoke about her character, Jordan Shaw: "She is there as an example to show Beckett that you actually can have it all. You can be a kick-ass agent, and you can be married and have a kid. Beckett doesn't have to shy away from romance."

== Reception ==
"Tick, Tick, Tick..." was both Castle's highest ratings (12.9 million) to date and ABC's highest audience in the 10:00pm time slot since March 12, 2001. However, Castle broke that record with the second episode in the two-parter with Boom!, which attracted 14.5 million viewers. It was also the time slot's highest 18-49 (3.6/10) number since March 27, 2006. It beat Monday night veteran CBS's CSI: Miami for the first time ever. It more than doubled the overall audience of NBC's Law & Order and beat it by 100% in the age group of 18-49.

"Tick, Tick, Tick..." received favorable reviews. Jonah Krakow of IGN, while noting that it was unlikely Beckett would be killed off, praised the creepier tone of the story, writing, "Normally, Castle is a fun, cute murder mystery show that doesn't take itself too seriously, but it was nice to see things get scarier in this two-parter." Entertainment Weekly's Mandi Bierly said, "Castle has a lot to live up to after the way ABC has been promoting the two-part 'event'... Last night, Part 1 did."
