= Heat Wave (novel) =

2009 novel

- Cover of the book
- Author: (fictional) Richard Castle; (real) Tom Straw
- Language: English
- Series: Nikki Heat
- Genre: Mystery; crime
- Publisher: Hyperion Books
- Publication date: September 29, 2009
- Publication place: United States
- Media type: Print: hardcover and paperback; Digital: e-book and audiobook
- Pages: 240 pages (paperback)
- ISBN: 9781401323820
- Followed by: Naked Heat

Heat Wave is the first in a series of mystery novels featuring the characters Nikki Heat, an NYPD homicide detective, and Jameson Rook, a journalist. The novel and its sequels are published by Hyperion Books as a tie-in to the ABC crime series Castle and attributed to that show's lead character Richard Castle. Heat Wave was published in 2009 and has been followed by Naked Heat (2010), Heat Rises (2011), Frozen Heat (2012), Deadly Heat (2013), Raging Heat (2014), Driving Heat (2015), High Heat (2016), Heat Storm (2017) and Crashing Heat (2019). The first seven novels in the series, through Driving Heat, were actually written by mystery novelist Tom Straw.

== Premise ==
Within the television show's universe, Richard Castle is a best-selling author who has published the final book in his successful Derrick Storm series, in which he killed off the main character, after writing the books became "too much like work". He is desperately searching for a new muse. When a copy-cat killer stages the crime scenes right from the pages of his books, he is called in to assist NYPD Detective Kate Beckett and her team.

At the end of the pilot episode, he becomes Beckett's partner in order to do "research". His fictional Heat Wave is released at the start of the second season which aired just before the actual release of the real-world book. Because of its success, ABC has released even more books, including a Derrick Storm trilogy and Derrick Storm graphic novels.

The actual book Heat Wave was written by Tom Straw, and revealed in installments on the Castle show's website. Straw said he wrote the book (and their first six successors) keeping in mind the purported author's idealized version of himself. The book's characters are based on the characters in the TV series.

== Plot summary ==
The title of the book refers to a heat wave that grips the city, the heat that is inside the characters' attraction for each other, and the character's surname. Castle's protagonist is NYPD homicide detective Nikki Heat. Ms. Heat is attractive, tough and means business when she's on a case. She is good at her job and is the leader of her team investigating murders. Heat's boss, the commissioner, assigns Jameson Rook, a reporter, to be attached to her to do research on his article. Rook proves to be a challenge to Heat as he has a mind of his own.

As much as Heat hates Rook, she also feels a compelling force that draws him to her. Heat feels the heat between them. Ms. Heat tries to handle her professional work, as well as answer to the call of nature as she falls for her handsome, magnetic shadow. In her work, Heat has to dig into the case of a real estate millionaire who has fallen to his death. His widow was attacked but survived the confrontation.

== Reception ==
Heat Wave reached No. 6 on The New York Times Best Seller list in its fourth week of release.
