= 40th People's Choice Awards =

Pop culture award show held in 2014

- Date: January 8, 2014
- Location: Nokia Theatre, Los Angeles, California
- Hosted by: Beth Behrs and Kat Dennings

Television/radio coverage
- Network: CBS

The 40th People's Choice Awards, honoring the best in popular culture for 2013, was held January 8, 2014, at the Nokia Theatre in Los Angeles, California, and was broadcast live on CBS at 9:00 pm EST. The ceremony was hosted by Beth Behrs and Kat Dennings. Nominations were announced on November 5, 2013.

Sandra Bullock dominated the 40th People's Choice Awards by winning the most awards and four of her five nominations, including Favorite Movie Actress.

== Performances ==
- OneRepublic – Counting Stars
- Sara Bareilles – Brave
- Brad Paisley – The Mona Lisa

== Presenters ==
- Jessica Alba
- Stana Katic
- Sandra Bullock
- Zac Efron
- Britney Spears
- Christina Aguilera
- Justin Timberlake
- Anna Faris
- Marg Helgenberger
- Roma Downey
- Kaley Cuoco
- Emily Deschanel
- Michael Weatherly
- Josh Holloway
- Ellen DeGeneres
- LL Cool J
- Chris O'Donnell
- Melissa McCarthy
- Drew Barrymore
- Nina Dobrev
- Robert Downey Jr.
- Sarah Michelle Gellar
- Sean Hayes
- Allison Janney
- Michael B. Jordan
- Queen Latifah
- Julianna Margulies
- Shemar Moore
- Norman Reedus
- Ian Somerhalder
- Miles Teller
- Allison Williams
- Malin Akerman
- Stephen Amell
- Wayne Brady
- Stephen Colbert
- Chris Colfer
- Naya Rivera
- Lucy Hale
- Heidi Klum
- Ross Mathews
- Joseph Morgan
- Meghan Ory
- Ian Ziering
- Matt LeBlanc

== Winners and nominees ==
Winners are listed first in bold.

=== Movies ===
Favorite Movie	Favorite Action Movie
**Iron Man 3**; Despicable Me 2; Fast & Furious 6; Monsters University; Star Trek Into Darkness	**Iron Man 3**; Fast & Furious 6; Star Trek Into Darkness; The Wolverine; World War Z
Favorite Comedic Movie	Favorite Dramatic Movie
**The Heat**; Grown Ups 2; The Hangover Part III; Instructions Not Included; We're the Millers	**Gravity**; The Butler; Captain Phillips; The Great Gatsby; Prisoners
Favorite Movie Actor	Favorite Movie Actress
**Johnny Depp**; Leonardo DiCaprio; Robert Downey Jr.; Hugh Jackman; Channing Tatum	**Sandra Bullock**; Jennifer Aniston; Scarlett Johansson; Melissa McCarthy; Gwyneth Paltrow
Favorite Dramatic Movie Actor	Favorite Dramatic Movie Actress
**Leonardo DiCaprio**; Ryan Gosling; Chris Hemsworth; Hugh Jackman; Channing Tatum	**Sandra Bullock**; Amy Adams; Halle Berry; Emma Stone; Oprah Winfrey
Favorite Comedic Movie Actor	Favorite Comedic Movie Actress
**Adam Sandler**; Bradley Cooper; James Franco; Zach Galifianakis; Chris Rock	**Sandra Bullock**; Jennifer Aniston; Scarlett Johansson; Melissa McCarthy; Emma Watson
Favorite Action Movie Actor	Favorite Movie Duo
**Robert Downey Jr.**; Vin Diesel; Hugh Jackman; Brad Pitt; Channing Tatum	**Sandra Bullock & George Clooney (Gravity)**; Jennifer Aniston & Jason Sudeikis (We're the Millers); Sandra Bullock & Melissa McCarthy (The Heat); Robert Downey Jr. & Gwyneth Paltrow (Iron Man 3); Chris Pine & Zachary Quinto (Star Trek Into Darkness)
Favorite Family Movie	Favorite Horror Movie
**Despicable Me 2**; Monsters University; Oz the Great and Powerful; Percy Jackson: Sea of Monsters; The Smurfs 2	**Carrie**; The Conjuring; Hansel & Gretel: Witch Hunters; Insidious: Chapter 2; Mama
Favorite Thriller Movie	Favorite Year End Movie
**Now You See Me**; A Good Day to Die Hard; The Call; Red 2; White House Down	**The Hunger Games: Catching Fire**; Anchorman 2: The Legend Continues; Frozen; The Hobbit: The Desolation of Smaug; Thor: The Dark World

=== Television ===
Favorite Network TV Comedy	Favorite Network TV Drama
**The Big Bang Theory**; 2 Broke Girls; Glee; How I Met Your Mother; Modern Family	**The Good Wife**; Chicago Fire; Grey's Anatomy; Nashville; Parenthood
Favorite Comedic TV Actor	Favorite Comedic TV Actress
**Chris Colfer**; Darren Criss; Jesse Tyler Ferguson; Neil Patrick Harris; Jim Parsons	**Kaley Cuoco**; Zooey Deschanel; Jane Lynch; Lea Michele; Melissa McCarthy
Favorite Dramatic TV Actor	Favorite Dramatic TV Actress
**Josh Charles**; Kevin Bacon; Jim Caviezel; Patrick Dempsey; Mark Harmon	**Stana Katic**; Mariska Hargitay; Julianna Margulies; Sandra Oh; Pauley Perrette
Favorite TV Crime Drama	Favorite Sci-Fi/Fantasy Show
**Castle**; Bones; Criminal Minds; The Mentalist; NCIS	**Beauty & the Beast**; Once Upon a Time; Supernatural; The Vampire Diaries; The Walking Dead
Favorite Sci-Fi/Fantasy TV Actor	Favorite Sci-Fi/Fantasy TV Actress
**Ian Somerhalder**; Jensen Ackles; Stephen Amell; Andrew Lincoln; Jared Padalecki	**Kristin Kreuk**; Emilia Clarke; Nina Dobrev; Ginnifer Goodwin; Tatiana Maslany
Favorite Cable TV Comedy	Favorite Cable TV Drama
**Psych**; Awkward; Cougar Town; Hot in Cleveland; Melissa & Joey	**The Walking Dead**; Downton Abbey; Pretty Little Liars; Sons of Anarchy; White Collar
Favorite Premium Cable TV Show	Favorite TV Movie/Miniseries
**Homeland**; Californication; Game of Thrones; Girls; True Blood	**American Horror Story: Coven**; Behind the Candelabra; The Bible; Sharknado; The White Queen
Favorite Cable TV Actress	Favorite TV Anti-Hero
**Lucy Hale**; Courteney Cox; Claire Danes; Angie Harmon; Maggie Smith	**Rick Grimes (Andrew Lincoln), The Walking Dead**; Jaime Lannister (Nikolaj Coster-Waldau), Game of Thrones; Walter White (Bryan Cranston), Breaking Bad; Dexter Morgan (Michael C. Hall), Dexter; Norman Bates (Freddie Highmore), Bates Motel
Favorite TV Bromance	Favorite TV Gal Pals
**Sam Winchester, Dean Winchester & Castiel, Supernatural**; Blaine Anderson & Sam Evans, Glee; Sheldon Cooper, Leonard Hofstadter, Howard Wolowitz & Raj Koothrappali, The Big Bang Theory; Kevin Ryan & Javier Esposito, Castle; Ted Mosby, Marshall Eriksen & Barney Stinson, How I Met Your Mother	**Rachel Berry & Santana Lopez, Glee**; Lily Aldrin & Robin Scherbatsky, How I Met Your Mother; Caroline Channing & Max Black, 2 Broke Girls; Meredith Grey & Cristina Yang, Grey's Anatomy; Penny, Bernadette Rostenkowski & Amy Farrah Fowler, The Big Bang Theory
Favorite On Screen Chemistry	Favorite TV Hero
**Damon Salvatore & Elena Gilbert, The Vampire Diaries**; Richard Castle & Kate Beckett, Castle; Kurt Hummel & Blaine Anderson, Glee; Derek Shepherd & Meredith Grey, Grey's Anatomy; Emma Swan & Hook, Once Upon a Time	**Norman Reedus, The Walking Dead**; Stephen Amell, Arrow; Billy Burke, Revolution; Andrew Lincoln, The Walking Dead; Noah Wyle, Falling Skies
Favorite New TV Comedy	Favorite New TV Drama
**Super Fun Night**; The Crazy Ones; The Michael J. Fox Show; The Millers; Mom	**Reign**; Agents of S.H.I.E.L.D.; Dracula; The Originals; Sleepy Hollow
Favorite Actor In A New TV Series	Favorite Actress In A New TV Series
**Joseph Morgan**; Michael J. Fox; Jonathan Rhys Meyers; Andy Samberg; Robin Williams	**Sarah Michelle Gellar**; Anna Faris; Allison Janney; Ming-Na Wen; Rebel Wilson
Favorite Streaming Series	Favorite Series We Miss Most
**Orange Is the New Black**; Arrested Development; Between Two Ferns with Zach Galifianakis; House of Cards; Losing It With John Stamos	**Breaking Bad**; 30 Rock; Dexter; Fringe; The Office
Favorite Daytime TV Host(s)	Favorite Late Night Talk Show Host
**Ellen DeGeneres, The Ellen DeGeneres Show**; Steve Harvey, Steve Harvey; Phil McGraw, Dr. Phil; Rachael Ray, Rachael Ray; Kelly Ripa & Michael Strahan, Live with Kelly and Michael	**Stephen Colbert, The Colbert Report**; Conan O'Brien, Conan; Jimmy Fallon, Late Night with Jimmy Fallon; Jimmy Kimmel, Jimmy Kimmel Live!; David Letterman, Late Show with David Letterman
Favorite New Talk Show Host	Favorite Competition TV Show
**Queen Latifah, The Queen Latifah Show**; Bethenny Frankel, Bethenny; Arsenio Hall, The Arsenio Hall Show; Ross Mathews, Hello Ross; Jenny McCarthy, The View	**The Voice**; America's Got Talent; Dancing with the Stars; MasterChef; The X Factor

=== Music ===
Favorite Male Artist	Favorite Female Artist
**Justin Timberlake**; Avicii; Michael Bublé; Bruno Mars; Blake Shelton	**Demi Lovato**; Katy Perry; Selena Gomez; Pink; Britney Spears
Favorite Breakout Artist	Favorite Pop Artist
**Ariana Grande**; Austin Mahone; Icona Pop; Imagine Dragons; Lorde	**Britney Spears**; Demi Lovato; Bruno Mars; Katy Perry; Justin Timberlake
Favorite Country Artist	Favorite Country Music Icon
**Taylor Swift**; The Band Perry; Lady Antebellum; Blake Shelton; Carrie Underwood	**Tim McGraw**; Alan Jackson; Toby Keith; Willie Nelson; George Strait
Favorite Hip-Hop Artist	Favorite R&B Artist
**Macklemore & Ryan Lewis**; Drake; Jay-Z; Lil Wayne; Kanye West	**Justin Timberlake**; Ciara; Alicia Keys; Rihanna; Robin Thicke
Favorite Band	Favorite Alternative/Rock Band
**Imagine Dragons**; Maroon 5; One Direction; OneRepublic; Paramore	**Fall Out Boy**; Imagine Dragons; Mumford & Sons; Muse; Paramore
Favorite Song	Favorite Album
**"Roar", Katy Perry**; "Just Give Me a Reason", Pink feat. Nate Ruess; "Mirrors", Justin Timberlake; "Radioactive", Imagine Dragons; "When I Was Your Man", Bruno Mars	**The 20/20 Experience, Justin Timberlake**; Bangerz, Miley Cyrus; Based on a True Story..., Blake Shelton; Blurred Lines, Robin Thicke; To Be Loved, Michael Bublé
Favorite Music Video	Favorite Music Fan Following
**"Roar", Katy Perry**; "Best Song Ever", One Direction; "Heart Attack", Demi Lovato; "Just Give Me a Reason", Pink feat. Nate Ruess; "Wrecking Ball", Miley Cyrus	**Lovatics, Demi Lovato**; Britney Army, Britney Spears; Directioners, One Direction; Katycats, Katy Perry; Little Monsters, Lady Gaga
