= Castle season 4 =

Castle
- Season 4
- DVD cover
- Starring: Nathan Fillion; Stana Katic; Jon Huertas; Seamus Dever; Tamala Jones; Molly C. Quinn; Susan Sullivan; Penny Johnson Jerald
- No. of episodes: 23

Release
- Original network: ABC
- Original release: September 19, 2011 – May 7, 2012

Season chronology
- ← Previous; Season 3 Next → Season 5

The fourth season of American crime-comedy-drama television series Castle was ordered on January 10, 2011, by ABC. The season aired from September 19, 2011, to May 7, 2012. The fourth season initially contained 22 episodes, but on December 8, 2011, ABC ordered an additional episode, bringing the total episode count to 23 episodes. Penny Johnson Jerald joined the cast as the new captain, Victoria "Iron" Gates for the fourth season.

== Overview ==
Richard Castle (Fillion) is a famous mystery novelist who has killed off the main character in his popular book series and has writer's block. He is brought in by the NYPD for questioning regarding a copy-cat murder based on one of his novels. He is intrigued by this new window into crime and murder, and uses his connection with the mayor to charm his way into shadowing Detective Kate Beckett (Katic). Castle decides to use Beckett as his muse for Nikki Heat, the main character of his next book series. Beckett, an avid reader of Castle's books, initially disapproves of having Castle shadow her work, but later warms up and recognizes Castle as a useful resource in her team's investigations.

== Cast ==
=== Main cast ===
- Nathan Fillion as Richard Castle
- Stana Katic as Det. Kate Beckett
- Jon Huertas as Det. Javier Esposito
- Seamus Dever as Det. Kevin Ryan
- Tamala Jones as Dr. Lanie Parish
- Molly C. Quinn as Alexis Castle
- Susan Sullivan as Martha Rodgers
- Penny Johnson Jerald as Captain Victoria Gates

=== Recurring cast ===
- Victor Webster as Josh Davidson
- Scott Paulin as Jim Beckett
- Michael Dorn as Dr. Carter Burke
- Juliana Dever as Jenny O'Malley

=== Guest cast ===
- Geoff Pierson as Mr. Smith
- Juliana Dever as Jenny
- Derek Webster as Mayor Robert Weldon
- Jennifer Beals as Sophia Conrad
- Josh Stamberg as Martin Danberg
- David Chisum as Thomas Gage
- Lorin McCraley as West Side Wally
- Meghan Markle as Charlotte Boyd
- Adam Baldwin as Det. Ethan Slaughter

== Episodes ==
No. overall	No. in season	Title	Directed by	Written by	Original release date	Prod. code	US viewers (millions)
59	1	"Rise"	Rob Bowman	Andrew W. Marlowe	September 19, 2011	401	13.28
After undergoing extensive surgery, Beckett takes three months to recuperate before returning to the NYPD. With Castle in tow she begins searching for her would-be assassin. Captain Montgomery is replaced by Captain Victoria "Iron" Gates, who does not approve of Castle's presence. Although Beckett at first claims that she does not remember the events of the gunshot, she confesses to a psychologist that she does. As Castle tries to dissuade Beckett from digging deeper into the case, he himself is immersed in the process of trying to identify Beckett's shooter.
60	2	"Heroes & Villains"	Jeff Bleckner	David Amann	September 26, 2011	402	11.67
Castle and Beckett investigate the murder of an ex-con found sliced in half in an alley, and believe a superhero-themed vigilante is behind the murder but the case gets complicated as they find out that there is more than one person dressed up as the same comic book hero.
61	3	"Head Case"	Holly Dale	David Grae	October 3, 2011	403	11.18
Castle and Beckett investigate a crime scene that involves a large pool of blood, but no victim, where their desperate search for the body ends at a cryonics company. The victim, a biology professor at Hudson and a friend of the company's CEO, had a cryogenics contract, triggered by an alarm that goes off when the victim's heart stops beating. Taking the bullet out would 'kill' the corpse, so the severed head remains frozen at the cryogenics laboratory. When Ryan and Esposito find needles with the victim's brain matter on it, the case takes a turn when Lanie discovers that someone was doing procedures to the victim's head, which is subsequently stolen during a break-in at the lab. Alexis receives news about Stanford.
62	4	"Kick the Ballistics"	Rob Bowman	Moira Kirland	October 10, 2011	404	10.23
Castle and Beckett investigate the murder of a young woman which was committed using Det. Ryan's old service weapon – the one that was stolen by the serial killer, 3XK. The victim's phone records reveal she had been in contact with Seth Carver, an undercover narcotics detective. When looking through old police records, Castle manages to find a link in the case which leads them to Philip Lee, the son of Clifford Lee, a notorious Chinese drug mobster.
63	5	"Eye of the Beholder"	John Terlesky	Shalisha Francis	October 17, 2011	405	11.23
Castle and Beckett investigate a murder committed during the theft of a valuable sculpture. Serena Kaye, a smart, sexy insurance investigator, joins them in the investigation, all the while hiding a very important secret from the team. She also attracts a lot of attention from Castle, with mixed feelings from Beckett.
64	6	"Demons"	Bill Roe	Rob Hanning	October 24, 2011	406	10.81
Castle and Beckett investigate the murder of a ghost hunter named Jack Sinclair who was looking into a haunting at a New York mansion. As they delve deeper into the case, Castle supports the idea that supernatural powers could be at work, while Beckett looks for a non-supernatural reason for the murder. While looking at the haunted mansion, Castle and Beckett discover a secret alcove where the killer killed Jack Sinclair, putting Castle's "demon" theory to rest.
65	7	"Cops & Robbers"	Bryan Spicer	Terence Paul Winter	October 31, 2011	407	12.58
Martha and Castle are held hostage by bank robbers dressed in hospital scrubs. Beckett's rescue efforts are hindered by a strict hostage negotiator. Meanwhile, Alexis faces problems in her relationship with Ashley.
66	8	"Heartbreak Hotel"	Bill Roe	Elizabeth Davis	November 7, 2011	408	11.07
During the investigation of the murder of an Atlantic City casino owner at an abandoned warehouse, strong leads emerge for the team in both New York and Atlantic City. As Beckett and Captain Gates work the New York leads together, Castle naturally chooses to join the detectives for the road trip to "America's Playground", hoping to help solve the case while throwing an impromptu bachelor party for Ryan.
67	9	"Kill Shot"	David M. Barrett	Alexi Hawley	November 21, 2011	409	10.85
The team searches for a sniper who is terrorizing New York; Beckett tries to hide her worsening PTSD from Castle and the detectives.
68	10	"Cuffed"	John Terlesky	Terri Miller & Andrew W. Marlowe	December 5, 2011	410	8.12
Castle and Beckett wake up handcuffed together in a sealed room, with no memory of how they got there. While Esposito and Ryan search for them, they must reconstruct their case from what little they remember.
69	11	"Till Death Do Us Part"	Jeff Bleckner	David Grae	January 9, 2012	411	9.76
When Castle and Beckett investigate the death of a ladies' man, a secret is revealed about Ryan's bride.
70	12	"Dial M for Mayor"	Kate Woods	Christine Boylan	January 16, 2012	412	9.41
A woman is found dead in the passenger seat of a car on loan from city hall by the Mayor (Derek Webster). Captain Gates urges Beckett to take Castle off the case due to his close friendship with the Mayor.
71	13	"An Embarrassment of Bitches"	Tom Wright	Rob Hanning	January 23, 2012	413	10.05
The investigation into the death of a famous dog trainer leads to reality television star Kay Cappuccio (Hilarie Burton). Alexis goes on a trip with her friend Buttons to look at colleges. Castle and Beckett debate where the dog, Royal, of the deceased (who had no family) should stay. Esposito has a crush.
72	14	"The Blue Butterfly"	Chuck Bowman	Terence Paul Winter	February 6, 2012	414	8.70
Castle attempts to solve a crime using a diary written in the 1940s. Every time he reads it he flashes back to the 1940s, with the principal characters being imagined as people described in the diary.
73	15	"Pandora"	Bryan Spicer	David Amann	February 13, 2012	415	8.86
Castle and Beckett find out that the killer they are pursuing is part of an international conspiracy; Alexis starts a new internship assisting Lanie in the Medical Examiner's Office.
74	16	"Linchpin"	Rob Bowman	Andrew W. Marlowe	February 20, 2012	416	9.73
Castle and Beckett realize what the linchpin is. While trying to prevent a war from breaking out they are seemingly betrayed by a person they thought they can trust. Throughout the investigation, Castle begins to learn more about his father.
75	17	"Once Upon a Crime"	Jeff Bleckner	Kate Sargeant	February 27, 2012	417	9.10
When the bodies of two murdered women are found dressed as fairy tale characters, it falls to Castle and Beckett to catch a killer before he can strike again.
76	18	"A Dance with Death"	Kevin Hooks	Moira Kirland	March 19, 2012	418	11.52
Castle and Beckett take the case of a troubled celebrity who was murdered moments before she was due to appear as a contestant on a popular dancing competition.
77	19	"47 Seconds"	Paul Holahan	Shalisha Francis	March 26, 2012	419	11.87
Castle, Beckett and the NYPD scramble to find the perpetrator of a bombing at the "Takeover Wall Street" protest. While Beckett is interrogating a suspect, she reveals she has always remembered everything about her shooting, causing Castle (who inadvertently overhears) to think Beckett has rejected his feelings for her.
78	20	"The Limey"	Bill Roe	Elizabeth Davis	April 2, 2012	420	11.69
Castle and Beckett are approached by a detective inspector named Colin Hunt (Brett Tucker) from Scotland Yard looking for help in solving the murder of a family friend. Beckett finally admits her feelings about Castle to Lanie, who convinces Beckett that she must make a move before it is too late.
79	21	"Headhunters"	John Terlesky	Alexi Hawley	April 16, 2012	421	11.23
Feeling that he is no longer able to work with Beckett, Castle finds a new partner in Detective Ethan Slaughter (Adam Baldwin). As the two attempt to prevent a gang war from taking over New York, Slaughter's questionable and often violent methods place Castle's life in danger.
80	22	"Undead Again"	Bill Roe	Christine Boylan	April 30, 2012	422	11.08
A witness to a murder claims that he and the victim were attacked by a zombie. Castle and Beckett take a step forward in their relationship, with Beckett stating that "Her wall" is about to come down.
81	23	"Always"	Rob Bowman	Terri Miller & Andrew W. Marlowe	May 7, 2012	423	12.36
When Castle and Beckett investigate the murder of a reformed gang member, they find evidence that links him to Beckett's shooting and the theft of documents from Roy Montgomery's home. The 12th Precinct is divided as Castle tries to stop Beckett from investigating, causing a rift in their partnership. Her efforts are unsuccessful, and Cole Maddox (Tahmoh Penikett)—her would-be assassin—escapes, vowing to kill her once he recovers Montgomery's files on his employer. Esposito and Beckett are suspended for withholding information on the case, however Beckett decides to resign. Beckett then goes to Castle's home where she finally gives in to her feelings for him, and they share a passionate kiss. The episode concludes with the mystery man protecting Kate, identified as Mr. Smith, being threatened by Maddox to give up the information he is using to blackmail them.

== Reception ==
=== Critical reception ===
The fourth season of Castle received positive reviews from critics, many of whom were pleased that the show finally united Fillion and Katic's characters Castle and Beckett after having four seasons of on-again-off-again relationship. Sandra Gonzalez from Entertainment Weekly was pleased in the way the relationship happened.

== DVD release ==
Castle: The Complete Fourth Season
Set details	Special features	
23 episodes; English (Dolby Digital 5.1 Surround); English SDH, Spanish and French subtitles	Audio Commentary; Bloopers & Outtakes; Deleted Scenes; Anatomy Of A Stunt; Radio Stars; One Bowman Is Never Enough	
DVD release dates
Region 1	Region 2	Region 4
September 18, 2012	March 25, 2013	November 14, 2012

== Awards and nominations ==
Award	Category	Nominee	Result	Ref.
People's Choice Awards	Favorite TV Crime Drama	Castle	Won	
People's Choice Awards	Favorite TV Drama Actor	Nathan Fillion	Won	
PRISM Awards	Performance in a Drama Episode	Stana Katic and Jon Huertas	Won	
PRISM Awards	Drama Series Episode – Mental Health	Castle: "Kill Shot"	Won	
TV Guide Magazine's Fan Favorites Awards	Favorite Couple	Nathan Fillion and Stana Katic	Won	
Shorty Awards	TV show	Castle	Nominated	
Shorty Awards	Best Actress	Stana Katic	Nominated	
Shorty Awards	Best Actor	Nathan Fillion	Won	
Shorty Awards	Fashion	Luke Reichle	Won	
ALMA Awards	Favorite TV Actor Supporting Role in a Drama	Jon Huertas	Won	
