= Castle season 8 =

Castle
- Season 8
- DVD cover
- Starring: Nathan Fillion; Stana Katic; Jon Huertas; Seamus Dever; Tamala Jones; Molly C. Quinn; Susan Sullivan; Toks Olagundoye
- No. of episodes: 22

Release
- Original network: ABC
- Original release: September 21, 2015 – May 16, 2016

Season chronology
- ← Previous; Season 7

The eighth and final season of American crime-comedy-drama television series Castle was ordered on May 7, 2015, by ABC. The season premiered on September 21, 2015, in the United States on ABC, and the finale aired on May 16, 2016. The season consisted of 22 episodes.

On April 18, 2016, ABC and ABC Productions announced that Stana Katic and Tamala Jones would not return for Castle's ninth season, should it be renewed. Despite several other cast members having signed on for a ninth season, on May 12, 2016, it was announced that the show would be cancelled instead; the final episode aired on May 16, 2016.

== Overview ==
Richard Castle (Fillion) is a famous mystery novelist who has killed off the main character Derrick Storm in his popular book series and has writer's block. He is brought in by the NYPD for questioning regarding a copy-cat murder based on one of his novels. He is intrigued by this new window into crime and murder, and uses his connection with the mayor to charm his way into shadowing Detective Kate Beckett (Katic). Castle decides to use Beckett as his muse for Nikki Heat, the main character of his next book series. Beckett, an avid reader of Castle's books, initially disapproves of having Castle shadow her work, but later warms up and recognizes Castle as a useful resource in her team's investigations.

== Cast ==
=== Main cast ===
- Nathan Fillion as Richard Castle
- Stana Katic as Captain Kate Castle
- Jon Huertas as Det. Javier Esposito
- Seamus Dever as Det. Kevin Ryan
- Tamala Jones as Dr. Lanie Parish
- Molly C. Quinn as Alexis Castle
- Susan Sullivan as Martha Rodgers
- Toks Olagundoye as Hayley Shipton

=== Recurring cast ===
- Sunkrish Bala as Vikram Singh
- Juliana Dever as Jenny Ryan

== Episodes ==
No. overall	No. in season	Title	Directed by	Written by	Original release date	Prod. code	US viewers (millions)
152	1	"XY"	Rob Bowman	Terence Paul Winter & Alexi Hawley	September 21, 2015	801	6.84
On Beckett's first day as Captain of the 12th Precinct, a mysterious phone call sees her disappear without warning or explanation. As Castle, Ryan and Esposito try to find Beckett, helped by Alexis and a British P.I., Hayley Shipton (Toks Olagundoye), they discover that her team from the Attorney General's special investigations division have been killed—including Beckett's former partner in Washington, Rachel McCord—leaving her on the run from a group of contract killers. Castle becomes increasingly desperate to find Beckett, turning to the incarcerated William Bracken for help; Bracken warns that Beckett's obsession will ultimately consume her.
153	2	"XX"	Paul Holahan	Alexi Hawley & Terence Paul Winter	September 28, 2015	802	6.70
Beckett and the mystery caller, a hacker named Vikram Singh (Sunkrish Bala), fend off the killers before a CIA agent named Rita (Ann Cusack), the wife of Jackson Hunt and Castle's stepmother, intervenes. Beckett and Singh start piecing the puzzle together: Singh encountered a project called LokSat and forwarded it on to McCord and her team, setting events in motion. When McCord was killed, he contacted Beckett. Rita supplements this with her own investigation into LokSat, revealing that Bracken had a partner who used CIA assets to smuggle drugs into the country during the events of "In the Belly of the Beast", and using the proceeds to bankroll Bracken's presidential campaign. Bracken is killed in prison by his partner Loksat and his team. Reuniting with Castle and her team, Beckett realizes that the conspiracy has not been brought to heel and that the Attorney General is a part of it. However, Bracken's partner remains at large, and his prediction that Beckett will be consumed by her obsession comes true when she leaves Castle.
154	3	"PhDead"	Rob Bowman	Chad Gomez Creasey	October 5, 2015	804	6.76
Castle insinuates himself into Beckett's investigation of the murder of a Hudson University student and discover that the frat boy was involved in a recreation of the Stanford Prison Experiment. Alexis goes undercover as a student. Beckett and Singh continue their secret investigation by having Singh metaphorically "dig up the dead" for more leads.
155	4	"What Lies Beneath..."	Larry Shaw	Barry O'Brien	October 12, 2015	803	6.78
Dave Johnson is shot and killed in a church while praying for guidance. Johnson is revealed to have the pen name P.J. Moffet, world-famous novelist and one of Castle's idols. Meanwhile, despite there being only one slot left for the sergeant's exam, Beckett manages to get both Ryan and Espo one.
156	5	"The Nose"	Steve Robin	Nancy Kiu	October 19, 2015	805	6.67
Mia Laszlo (Stephnie Weir) calls 9-1-1 after witnessing the murder of a courier and believing that she shared an elevator ride with the killer. What makes the case interesting is that Mia suffers from hyperosmia, a heightened sense of smell. Hayley Shipton also returns, having been hired by an insurance company to recover the item the victim was carrying. Meanwhile, Ryan is confused upon learning that only Espo passed the sergeant's exam.
157	6	"Cool Boys"	Paul Holahan	Alexi Hawley	November 9, 2015	808	6.07
Det. Ethan Slaughter (Adam Baldwin) seeks out Castle to assist with a case where his murdered informant was involved in the theft of a high-tech chip worth a million dollars. In the process, they discover that 50 million dollars were also stolen during the theft but by a different party, who is also the murderer.
158	7	"The Last Seduction"	John Terlesky	Rob Hanning	November 16, 2015	806	6.66
The precinct investigates the murder of a man who has apparently been seducing married women for money. Meanwhile, despite their 'time out', Castle plans a surprise for Beckett as their first wedding anniversary approaches, and Ryan and Esposito's dispute over the sergeant's exam comes to a head.
159	8	"Mr. & Mrs. Castle"	Jeff Bleckner	Christine Roum	November 23, 2015	807	6.65
Castle and Beckett work together to solve a murder on a cruise ship, while it is moving out to sea. The cruise ship was smuggling uncut heroin, which the victim wanted to expose and tell the police. Beckett and Vikram find out that the heroin matches heroin produced by Vulcan Simmons' pipeline. Meanwhile, Castle asks Hayley to find out who Beckett is texting, and comes to the realization that she is looking for the murderers of her team from the Attorney General's office. After a failed attempt at catching someone who is part of the drug cartel, Beckett realizes that she cannot do it alone, and admits it to Castle.
160	9	"Tone Death"	Hanelle Culpepper	Robert Bella	February 8, 2016	809	5.72
The body of an ex-con turned a-capella singer is found during Martha's singing rehearsal and the team enters the world of competitive a-capella. Meanwhile, Castle and Beckett act infuriated towards each other in front of Ryan and Esposito, in an effort to maintain the facade of separation. However, this plan backfires and Castle and Beckett are forced to tell the boys that they are having respective affairs with a sexy Russian model named Svetlana, and a Dr. Livingstone.
161	10	"Witness for the Prosecution"	Bill Roe	Terence Paul Winter	February 14, 2016	810	4.19
Five months ago, while Castle was at a party, a woman was murdered, and Castle witnessed a waitress appearing to stab the victim. In the present, Castle is an eyewitness to the waitress's trial, but her defense attorney (who is connected to LokSat), not only humiliates Castle, but also causes Castle to doubt himself. Castle tries to delay the trial in order to find the truth.
162	11	"Dead Red"	Jeannot Szwarc	Jim Adler	February 15, 2016	811	5.15
When the son of a Russian diplomat is murdered, Vasily, a cheery embassy official and a fan of Castle's, is sent to observe the team's investigation. Beckett asks Castle to chaperone him, but it soon becomes clear that there is more to Vasily than meets the eye.
163	12	"The Blame Game"	Jessica Yu	Michal Zebede	February 22, 2016	812	5.48
Following the murder of an investigative journalist, Castle and Beckett are abducted and placed in separate rooms with strangers and forced to play their captor's mind games. Esposito, Ryan, Alexis and Hayley race against time to rescue them.
164	13	"And Justice for All"	Kate Woods	Adam Frost	February 29, 2016	813	5.26
A night-time zoo caretaker and ESL (English Second Language) student is found dead in a pit of poisonous snakes. Castle, suffering from writer's block, convinces Beckett to let him help with the case. Castle goes undercover as an ESL student to get information from the other students, but it may not be easy understanding them, let alone getting them to talk. Meanwhile, Beckett's team finds that their victim may not be as innocent as he seems. Castle also remembers a little bit of where he was when he went missing.
165	14	"The G.D.S."	John Terlesky	Alexi Hawley	March 7, 2016	814	5.68
Castle, Alexis and Hayley go to Los Angeles in search of answers for his missing two months. At the same time, he is extended an invitation from a prestigious detectives' club in exchange for solving the murder of one of their members, who was tracking an elusive bi-coastal serial killer called "The Phantom". Competing for membership is another investigator, Kendall Frost (Summer Glau). As their investigation progresses, Castle learns a dark secret from Hayley that she knew Castle through his father during his missing two months. Castle eventually discovers that he himself had his memories erased and uncovers a video in which Castle reveals that he had known about LokSat and had nearly gotten himself killed trying to catch him. Knowing that Beckett would never give up if she knew the truth, Castle had all of his knowledge erased from his mind in order to protect her. As a result, Castle realizes that he inadvertently caused the death of Beckett's former AG team by trying to protect her.
166	15	"Fidelis Ad Mortem"	Rob Bowman	Chad Gomez Creasey	March 21, 2016	815	6.50
An NYPD academy recruit is shot and killed with a gun belonging to a fellow recruit. Beckett puts the remaining members through mock training drills, including interrogations, to try and ferret out the killer. Espo and Ryan also learn of a steroid ring at the academy. Meanwhile, Castle tells Beckett of what he learned in L.A.: that he knew about LokSat a year ago and he had his memories erased to protect her. Beckett and Castle decide to hunt LokSat together and resume their romantic relationship.
167	16	"Heartbreaker"	Tom Wright	Barry O'Brien	April 4, 2016	816	6.90
An armored car driver is killed and money is stolen during a dropoff. Clues at the scene are similar to an auction house heist that Espo worked nine years ago. Sonya Ruiz (Angélica Celaya) was one of three involved in that heist and is still in prison. She was also Espo's fiancée at the time. She is given a furlough and helps Espo track down another member of her former team, as Ryan learns she might still be linked to the current case. In the end, Espo convinces her to surrender and the DA agrees to a deal if she will testify against her partner. However, Sonia will still have to go to prison for at least two more years. Meanwhile, Kate has moved back in to Castle's place, and they mutually agree to hunt LokSat together. However, she cannot get used to his home operating system, Lucy.
168	17	"Death Wish"	Bill Roe	Stephanie Hicks	April 11, 2016	817	6.44
The murder of a member of a Turkish smuggling ring leads the team on a search for an item believed to be Aladdin's lamp. Meanwhile, Martha needs Castle's help in getting a certain celebrity to endorse her book – Oprah Winfrey. Also, Ryan's wife Jenny gives birth to a baby boy, whom they name Nicholas Javier.
169	18	"Backstabber"	Jessica Yu	Robert Bella	April 18, 2016	818	5.86
Hayley's MI6 friend asks her to break into a building and load spyware into a computer for proof of an affair. Hayley and a partner break in, and the plan goes off without a hitch, but Hayley's partner is found dead in the same building the next day. Hayley must find out the real reason for the spyware, while making sure the precinct doesn't know she was involved. She comes clean just before it is unveiled that the spyware was a worm that collapsed London's power grid and she is the apparent patsy.
170	19	"Dead Again"	Bill Roe	Rob Hanning	April 25, 2016	819	6.19
Alan Masters, a city inspector, has two attempts made on his life, but comes out fine both times, which makes Castle think that Alan is a superhero, and has Lanie doubt her medical expertise. Meanwhile, Vikram finds out that Caleb Brown, the defense attorney, met with LokSat in Los Angeles around the same time Castle was there during his missing two months. Beckett tries to convince Caleb to work with her to take down LokSat. Caleb gives Beckett a phone, which could be used to find LokSat's identity.
171	20	"Much Ado About Murder"	Hanelle Culpepper	Christine Roum	May 2, 2016	820	6.03
Zane Cannon, a film star turned theatre actor, is stabbed to death while rehearsing alone his role as "Hamlet" in a production directed by Erin Cherloff (Jewel Staite). While the team investigates Zane's dealings in Spanish Harlem, Castle gets abducted by a cartel but only to be asked to write a screenplay about the gang leader, Oso. He tells Castle that Zane wanted to buy the film rights. Oso's brother Hector gives a clue about the killer. After solving the case, Castle and Beckett's dinner is interrupted by a package delivered containing Oso's biography. She then gets a call that Oso, in jail for the abduction and subsequent shootout, has escaped.
172	21	"Hell to Pay"	John Terlesky	Story by : Jim Adler; Teleplay by : Adam Frost & Nancy Kiu	May 9, 2016	821	6.74
During a power outage, Alexis and Hayley get an unexpected axe-wielding visitor who promptly dies from a previous wound. While the team investigates the murder, the victim's obsession with Biblical prophecy on the end of days---and a jarring discovery inside his own private investigations office---causes Castle to become increasingly obsessed with the idea he is marked for death and the end of days may be coming. Meanwhile, Beckett and Caleb meet again with Caleb making a striking admission to her.
173	22	"Crossfire"	Rob Bowman	Alexi Hawley & Terence Paul Winter	May 16, 2016	822	7.65
As the rest of the team investigates a body found burned in the trunk of a car, Castle, Beckett and Vikram are given instructions from LokSat via the phone for Caleb to deliver a flash drive to Loksat's accountant. Espo later calls Beckett to say the body in the trunk was identified as Caleb. The dropoff is a trap, resulting in a shootout. Castle and Beckett are saved by Mason Wood (Gerald McRaney) of the L.A. detectives' club. Castle goes home to check on his family, while Beckett learns who torched Caleb. Impatient, Castle goes to find Beckett but is captured by LokSat's henchman and is given a truth serum which jeopardizes everyone he has told about LokSat. Beckett is picked up by Mason, who is soon exposed as LokSat. The precinct saves Castle from death, and he must save Beckett from LokSat. Back home safely, Castle is shot by Caleb who had faked his death and turning on LokSat before Caleb is killed by Beckett who in turn is also shot. Wounded, she crawls to an injured Castle. Seven years later, the two enjoy breakfast while their three children play. For fans of the show, this was an "Easter egg": In a Time Will Tell (Season 6, Episode 5) - one of several Castle "Halloween specials" - someone named Simon Doyle, claiming to be a time traveler, foretold that they would be married with three children, and that Beckett would be a Senator.

== Production ==
=== Development ===
Castle was renewed for an eighth season on May 7, 2015. Following the seventh season, David Amann stepped down as showrunner, and writer Terence Paul Winter and Alexi Haley were hired as the new showrunners for the eighth season. TVLine announced on July 7, 2015, that Toks Olagundoye had been added as a series regular for the eighth season, playing former Scotland Yard police officer Hayley Vargas. Filming for the eighth season started on July 17, 2015, and ended in April 2016. A promotional poster was released on August 10, 2015, by ABC.

=== Final season speculation ===
The eighth season was speculated as being the final season of Castle. After the seventh season, both Nathan Fillion's and Stana Katic's contracts expired, and new contract negotiations began before the seventh season ended. It was reported on April 16, 2015, that Fillion renewed his contract for an eighth season, while Katic renewed hers on May 12, 2015. However, in January 2016, speculation began that the series might move on without Fillion and Katic as their contracts were due to expire again after the eighth season. After March 3, 2016, when ABC renewed most of their shows, Castle was one of the few shows excluded, adding to the rumors. It was also rumored that if the show were to be renewed for a ninth season, it was only going to be renewed for 13 episodes by ABC and would most likely not premiere until mid-season in 2017 and would only have 6 cast members, with the departure of Katic and Jones, despite the show usually having 8 cast members. TVLine reported on April 5, 2016, that the producers were filming multiple endings for the season in case the show was cancelled. Co-showrunner Alexi Hawley commented on the report saying "There's stuff up in the air, so we are trying to leave it in a very dynamic way which leaves open the possibility that maybe the show won't come back in the same form next season — although, again, we really hope that it does."

Two days later, Deadline announced that Stana Katic would not return for a potential ninth season, as well as Tamala Jones, who had been on the show since the first season. The reason given was due to budgetary decisions made by ABC. On May 5, 2016, TVLine reported that Fillion had signed up for a potential ninth season. A few days later, it was announced that Seamus Dever had signed up for a ninth season, while co-stars Jon Huertas, Molly Quinn, Susan Sullivan and Toks Olagundoye were in finalizing deals with their contracts. Huertas was announced to have renewed his contract on May 11, 2016. Despite lead actor Fillion and other cast members signing on for a potential ninth season, Castle was cancelled on May 12, 2016.

== DVD release ==
Castle: The Complete Eighth Season
Set details	Special features	
22 episodes; 946 minutes; 5-disc set; English (Dolby Digital 5.1 Surround); English SDH, Spanish and French subtitles	Bloopers & Mistakes; Deleted Scenes; Audio Commentaries; The Great Escape	
DVD release dates
Region 1	Region 2	Region 4
August 23, 2016	November 14, 2016	November 2, 2016
