= Deadly Heat =

2013 novel by Richard Castle

- Cover of the book
- Author: Richard Castle
- Language: English
- Series: Nikki Heat
- Genre: Mystery, Crime
- Publisher: Hyperion Books
- Publication date: September 17th, 2013
- Publication place: United States
- Media type: Print Hardcover and Paperback and E-book and Audiobook
- Pages: 240 pages (paperback)
- ISBN: 9781401324803
- Preceded by: Frozen Heat
- Followed by: Raging Heat

Deadly Heat is the fifth novel in Richard Castle's series about NYPD homicide detective Nikki Heat and journalist Jameson Rook. It was released on September 17, 2013. The novel is published by Hyperion Books in collaboration with ABC. ABC produces the TV series Castle where the main character, Richard Castle, to whom the book is credited, shadows NYPD Detective Kate Beckett.

== Premise and background ==
On ABC's mystery television show Castle, Richard Castle is a best-selling author who is a consultant to the NYPD and is assigned to Detective Kate Beckett, who is his muse for the series. The novel is written over the period of the fifth season. On February 5, 2013 ABC announced that the fifth novel will be released on September 17, 2013 in hardcover. The novel will be 240 pages long. The serial killer in this novel will be partially based on Season 2 serial killer, Scott Dunn. As expected, the cover is similar to previous covers in the series, with a silhouette of Detective Heat.

== Characters ==
- Detective Nikki Heat is the lead character in Richard Castle's Nikki Heat book series. Heat is loosely based on NYPD detective Kate Beckett, possessing a similar backstory, in that her decision to become a detective was motivated by the death of someone close to her - although Heat has a niece and siblings that Beckett lacks - and the first case she investigates is adapted from several real cases Castle helped Beckett solve. Heat is assisted by her partner and sometime lover, journalist Jameson Rook. In addition, her colleagues Detectives Raley and Ochoa also work with her on cases.
- Jameson Rook is a fictional character that Richard Castle created for his Nikki Heat series of crime novels. He is a famous magazine journalist who shadows the main character, Detective Nikki Heat, as well as her on-again off-again love interest. The character moonlights as a romance novelist under the pen name Victoria St. Clair. He is based on Castle himself and the way he works with Kate Beckett. ("Nikki Heat")
- Captain Charles Montrose was the captain of Heat's precinct and was based on Captain Montgomery. Montrose is dead.
- Detective Ochoa is based on Detective Esposito.
- Detective Raley is based on Detective Ryan.
- Lauren Parry is the medical examiner and is based on Dr. Lanie Parish.
- Margaret Rook is Jameson Rook's mother and is based on Richard Castle's own mother Martha Rodgers.
- Wallace "Wally" Irons is the captain of Heat's precinct and is based on Captain Victoria Gates.
