= Elizabeth Davis Beall =

American screenwriter and television producer

Elizabeth Beall
- Other names: Elizabeth Davis; Elizabeth Restropo Davis; Elizabeth Beall
- Occupations: Television producer, television writer
- Years active: 2005–present
- Spouse: Will Beall (m. 2012)

Elizabeth Beall (née Davis) is an American screenwriter and television producer, best known for her work on the television series Castle.

== Personal life ==
She married a fellow ex-Castle writer Will Beall in 2012.

== Television filmography ==
=== Miscellaneous crew ===
- Castle: story editor (2009–2010) and executive story editor (2010–2011) (credited as Elizabeth Davis)

=== Producer ===
- Castle: co-producer (2011–2012; credited as Elizabeth Davis) and producer (2012–2014; credited as Elizabeth Beall)
- Scorpion: co-executive producer (2014–2015; credited as Elizabeth Beall, 2015–2017 as Elizabeth Davis Beall)
- Lethal Weapon (2017–2018): co-executive producer (credited as Elizabeth Davis Beall)
- The Rookie (2018–present): co-executive producer (credited as Elizabeth Davis Beall)

=== Writer ===
- The Rookie (2018–present): Episodes: "The Roundup", "The Checklist", "Under the Gun", "Lockdown", "Man of Honor", "Hit List", "Labor Day", "Secrets and Lies", "The Kiss"
- Lethal Weapon (2017–2018): Episodes: "Birdwatching", "The Odd Couple"
- Scorpion (2014–2017): Episodes: "Shorthanded", "Revenge", "Love Boat", "Tech, Drugs and Rock'n'Roll", "We're Gonna Need a Bigger Vote".
- Castle (2009–2014): (11 episodes: "Little Girl Lost", "One Man's Treasure", "Boom!", "Almost Famous", "One Life to Lose", "Heartbreak Hotel", "The Limey", "Cloudy with a Chance of Murder", "Under the Influence", "Need to Know", "Dressed to Kill")
- Viva Laughlin (2007): Episode: "Fighter"
- Beautiful People (2005–2006): Episodes: "Over Exposure", "Where Are We Now?"
