= Homicide investigator =

Detective investigating suspicious deaths

A homicide investigator or homicide detective investigates suspicious deaths and collects and evaluates evidence to determine the cause of a homicide.

Homicide investigators begin their work by investigating the crime scene to identify and secure evidence. They set the parameters of the crime scene to prevent public interference, ensuring the preservation of both the evidence and the scene itself. After the initial inspection, they reach out to known witnesses and search for potential witnesses in the vicinity of the crime scene. Revisiting the scene is common, as investigators re-inspect the area to identify any evidence that might have been missed during the initial investigation.

Homicide investigators aim to deliver justice by holding the guilty accountable and protecting the innocent from wrongful accusations. Their duties often include:

- Collaborating with other law enforcement agencies or the U.S. District Attorney's office;
- Arresting suspects;
- Preparing, serving, and executing misdemeanor and felony warrants;
- Taking witness depositions; and
- Preparing court documents, including reports, subpoenas, and summons.
