= Castle (TV series) =

American crime comedy-drama TV series (2009–2016)

- Title card of Castle
- Genre: Mystery; Police procedural; Crime; Comedy drama
- Created by: Andrew W. Marlowe
- Starring: Nathan Fillion; Stana Katic; Susan Sullivan; Ruben Santiago-Hudson; Molly C. Quinn; Jon Huertas; Tamala Jones; Seamus Dever; Penny Johnson Jerald; Toks Olagundoye
- Composers: Robert Duncan; Kim Planert
- Country of origin: United States
- Original language: English
- No. of seasons: 8
- No. of episodes: 173 (list of episodes)

Production
- Executive producers: Andrew W. Marlowe; Rob Bowman; Armyan Bernstein; Laurie Zaks; Barry Schindel; René Echevarria; David Amann; David Grae; Rob Hanning; Terri Edda Miller; Terence Paul Winter; Alexi Hawley
- Production location: Los Angeles
- Camera setup: Single-camera
- Running time: 43 minutes
- Production companies: ABC Studios; Beacon Pictures; The Barry Schindel Company (2009, season 1); Experimental Pictures (2009–2013, seasons 2–5); Milmar Pictures (2013–2015, seasons 6–7)

Original release
- Network: ABC
- Release: March 9, 2009 – May 16, 2016

Castle is an American crime mystery comedy-drama television series that aired on ABC for a total of eight seasons from March 9, 2009, to May 16, 2016. The series was produced by Beacon Pictures and ABC Studios.

Created by Andrew W. Marlowe, Castle primarily traces the lives of Richard Castle (Nathan Fillion), a best-selling mystery novelist, and Kate Beckett (Stana Katic), a homicide detective, as they solve various unusual crimes in New York City. Detective Beckett is initially infuriated at the thought of working with a writer and goes to great lengths to keep him out of her way. However, the two soon start developing feelings for each other. The overarching plot of the series focused on the romance between the two lead characters and their ongoing investigation of the murder of Beckett's mother.

On May 12, 2016, it was announced that despite some cast members signing one-year contracts for a potential ninth season, the show had been canceled.

== Premise ==
Richard Castle is a famous mystery novelist. Bored and suffering from writer's block, he kills off Derrick Storm, the main character in his successful book series. He is brought in by the New York Police Department for questioning regarding a copycat murder based on one of his novels, where he meets and becomes intrigued by Detective Kate Beckett, the officer assigned to the case. Castle is inspired to take Beckett as his muse for Nikki Heat, the main character of his next book series, and uses his friendship with the mayor to pressure the police to let him shadow Beckett. Castle's exuberant personality clashes with Beckett's more reserved and professional demeanor. However, as Beckett begins to appreciate Castle's assistance in helping her catch killers, the two eventually become friends and then lovers. Their cases often deal with murders occurring within various unusual subcultures or milieus, including reality TV shows, vampire enthusiasts, a science-fiction convention, and a man who claims to be a time traveler. A recurring plotline deals with the unsolved murder of Beckett's mother years before, an investigation that leads to an increasingly sprawling and dangerous conspiracy. The series also focuses on the backstories of supporting characters like Detectives Javier Esposito and Kevin Ryan, Medical Examiner Lanie Parish, Captain Roy Montgomery, and Captain Victoria Gates, through multiple episodes.

== Cast and characters ==
=== Main ===
- Nathan Fillion as Richard Castle, born Richard Alexander Rodgers, a best-selling mystery writer. Castle's unusual theories sometimes irritate the people he works with, but often help solve the case. He is the only son of actress Martha Rodgers and a man known as Jackson Hunt, whom he meets for the first time as an adult. He is raising his daughter Alexis by himself, and his mother lives rent-free in his spacious apartment.
- Stana Katic as Katherine "Kate" Beckett, an NYPD homicide detective, later promoted to captain. She was raised in Manhattan. She was inspired to be a detective by her mother's murder. She works with fellow detectives Javier Esposito and Kevin Ryan and medical examiner Lanie Parish, who is her best friend.
- Jon Huertas as Detective Javier "Javi" Esposito, a former United States Army Special Forces soldier who now works in the homicide division as part of Beckett's team.
- Seamus Dever as Detective Kevin Ryan, a former narcotics detective who is part of Beckett's team. He is best friends with his partner, Detective Esposito.
- Tamala Jones as Dr. Lanie Parish, a medical examiner, Beckett's friend, and an on-again, off-again love interest for Esposito.
- Ruben Santiago-Hudson as Captain Roy Montgomery (seasons 1–3; guest season 6), Beckett's boss
- Molly C. Quinn as Alexis Castle, Castle's daughter by his first wife, Meredith
- Susan Sullivan as Martha Rodgers, Castle's mother, an actress on and off Broadway
- Penny Johnson Jerald as Captain Victoria "Iron" Gates (seasons 4–7), Captain Montgomery's replacement following his death. She was formerly with Internal Affairs.
- Toks Olagundoye as Hayley Shipton (season 8), a quick-witted, free-spirited former Metropolitan Police Service officer and MI6 operative from Britain who now works as a security specialist

=== Recurring ===
- Arye Gross as Dr. Sidney Perlmutter, a medical examiner who assists on some of Beckett's cases and does little to hide his dislike of Castle
- Scott Paulin as Jim Beckett, Kate Beckett's father
- Maya Stojan as Tory Ellis, an NYPD Tech officer who assists on Beckett's cases
- Juliana Dever as Jenny Ryan (née O'Malley), Ryan's wife (and Seamus Dever's real wife)
- Darby Stanchfield as Meredith Harper, an actress who was Castle's first wife and Alexis's mother. She is regularly portrayed as self-centered and dramatic.
- Monet Mazur as Gina Cowell, Castle's publisher and second wife
- Bailey Chase as Will Sorenson, an FBI agent and Beckett's ex-boyfriend
- Michael Trucco as Detective Tom Demming, a robbery detective with whom Beckett briefly becomes involved
- Victor Webster as Dr. Josh Davidson, Beckett's motorcycle-riding, cardiac-surgeon ex-boyfriend
- Michael Mosley as Jerry Tyson/the Triple Killer (3XK), a methodical and meticulous serial killer who returns to New York every few years to terrorize the city. He is frequently believed to be dead, only to resurface.
- Jack Coleman as William Bracken, a popular, charismatic, and murderously corrupt senator representing the State of New York with ambitions of one day becoming president
- Geoff Pierson as Mr. Smith, a friend of Captain Montgomery's who holds evidence that keeps the murderer of Beckett's mother away from her
- Michael Dorn as Dr. Carver Burke, a psychiatrist who helps Beckett overcome the trauma of her near-fatal shooting and also deal with her various hidden emotions
- Jonathan Adams as Vulcan Simmons, a ruthless Manhattan drug lord
- Dan Castellaneta as Judge Markway, a judge who frequently issues warrants for Beckett, and one of Castle's poker buddies
- Phil LaMarr as Dr. Holloway, a psychiatrist who evaluates the mental stability of suspects
- Ken Baumann as Ashley, Alexis' steady boyfriend
- Myko Olivier as Pi, Alexis's boyfriend (at the beginning of season six) with whom she shares an apartment for a while
- Lisa Edelstein as Agent Rachel McCord, Beckett's partner during her brief time working for the Attorney-General's Office
- Annie Wersching as Dr. Kelly Nieman, a respected plastic surgeon with a secret life as Jerry Tyson's partner in crime
- Matt Letscher as 'Henry Jenkins' (real name unknown), an impostor purportedly with the CIA who is involved with Castle's disappearance
- Sunkrish Bala as Vikram Singh (season 8), a high-strung tech analyst with the Attorney General's Office in Washington, D.C., where Beckett briefly works. He helps Beckett track down and destroy the mysterious organization behind Beckett's mother's murder and numerous other crimes. He later works as a computer analyst for the NYPD.
- Kristoffer Polaha as Caleb Brown, an idealistic public defender found to have links to the LokSat conspiracy
- James Brolin as Jackson Hunt, an operative of the Special Activities Center of the CIA, and Castle's father (from a one-night stand)

Real-life writers Stephen J. Cannell, James Patterson, Dennis Lehane, and Michael Connelly appear as themselves during periodic games of poker at Castle's apartment. Typically, they discuss Castle and Beckett's current case and tease Castle about his involvement with Beckett. Following Cannell's death on September 30, 2010, an empty chair was kept at the poker table for a year in his honor.

== Broadcast history ==
Castle premiered as a midseason replacement on ABC on March 9, 2009. ABC renewed Castle for a second season with an initial order of 13 episodes (later extended to 24 episodes). The second season premiered on Monday, September 21, 2009. In March 2010, ABC renewed Castle for a third, 22-episode season, which began on September 20, 2010. On November 11, 2010, ABC extended the episode order to 24. On January 10, 2011, ABC announced Castle had been renewed for a fourth season for 22 episodes. Season four premiered on September 19, 2011. On December 8, 2011, ABC ordered an additional episode bringing season 4 up to 23 episodes.

On May 10, 2012, Castle was renewed for a fifth season by ABC, which started on Monday September 24, 2012. Two additional episodes were ordered on October 19, 2012, and February 5, 2013, respectively, which brought season 5 up to a total of 24 episodes. On May 10, 2013, ABC announced via Twitter that Castle had been renewed for a sixth season. On May 8, 2014, ABC renewed the series for a seventh season, which premiered on September 29, 2014. On May 7, 2015, the series was renewed for its eighth season, which premiered on September 21, 2015. On April 18, 2016, ABC and ABC Productions announced that Stana Katic and Tamala Jones would not return for Castle's ninth season, should it be renewed. Despite several other cast members having signed on for a ninth season, on May 12, 2016, it was announced that the show would be canceled instead; the final episode aired on May 16, 2016.

Series overview
| Season | Episodes | Originally released | |
| Season | Episodes | First released | Last released |
|---|---|---|---|
| 1 | 10 | March 9, 2009 | May 11, 2009 |
| 2 | 24 | September 21, 2009 | May 17, 2010 |
| 3 | 24 | September 20, 2010 | May 16, 2011 |
| 4 | 23 | September 19, 2011 | May 7, 2012 |
| 5 | 24 | September 24, 2012 | May 13, 2013 |
| 6 | 23 | September 23, 2013 | May 12, 2014 |
| 7 | 23 | September 29, 2014 | May 11, 2015 |
| 8 | 22 | September 21, 2015 | May 16, 2016 |

== Reception ==
=== U.S. Nielsen ratings ===
Viewership and ratings per season of Castle
| Season | Timeslot (ET) | Episodes | First aired | | Last aired | | TV season | Viewership rank | Avg. viewers (millions) | Avg. 18–49 rating |
| Season | Timeslot (ET) | Episodes | Date | Viewers (millions) | Date | Viewers (millions) | TV season | Viewership rank | Avg. viewers (millions) | Avg. 18–49 rating |
|---|---|---|---|---|---|---|---|---|---|---|
| 1 | Monday 10:00 pm | 10 | March 9, 2009 | 10.76 | May 11, 2009 | 9.96 | 2008–09 | 40 | 10.19 | TBD |
| 2 | Monday 10:00 pm | 24 | September 21, 2009 | 9.26 | May 17, 2010 | 10.07 | 2009–10 | 30 | 10.25 | TBD |
| 3 | Monday 10:00 pm | 24 | September 20, 2010 | 10.70 | May 16, 2011 | 12.93 | 2010–11 | 30 | 11.44 | TBD |
| 4 | Monday 10:00 pm | 23 | September 19, 2011 | 13.28 | May 7, 2012 | 12.36 | 2011–12 | 22 | 12.18 | TBD |
| 5 | Monday 10:00 pm | 24 | September 24, 2012 | 10.45 | May 13, 2013 | 11.16 | 2012–13 | 19 | 12.26 | TBD |
| 6 | Monday 10:00 pm | 23 | September 23, 2013 | 11.48 | May 12, 2014 | 10.59 | 2013–14 | 13 | 12.63 | TBD |
| 7 | Monday 10:00 pm | 23 | September 29, 2014 | 10.75 | May 11, 2015 | 8.44 | 2014–15 | 37 | 10.69 | TBD |
| 8 | Monday 10:00 pm | 22 | September 21, 2015 | 6.84 | May 16, 2016 | 7.65 | 2015–16 | 44 | 9.10 | TBD |

=== Awards and nominations ===
| Year | Association | Category | Nominee(s) / episode | Result | Ref. |
|---|---|---|---|---|---|
| 2009 | Emmy Awards | Outstanding Music Composition for a Series | Castle / "Flowers For Your Grave" | Nominated | |
| 2009 | Satellite Awards | Best Actor in a Series, Drama | Nathan Fillion | Nominated | |
| 2009 | Satellite Awards | Best Actress in a Series, Drama | Stana Katic | Nominated | |
| 2010 | Emmy Awards | Outstanding Hairstyling for a Single Camera Series | Castle / "Vampire Weekend" | Nominated | |
| 2010 | Emmy Awards | Outstanding Makeup for a Single Camera Series | Castle / "Vampire Weekend" | Nominated | |
| 2010 | Emmy Awards | Outstanding Prosthetic Makeup for a Series, Miniseries, Movie or a Special | Castle / "Vampire Weekend" | Nominated | |
| 2010 | Golden Reel Awards | Best Sound Editing – Short Form Music in Television | Castle / "Famous Last Words" | Nominated | |
| 2010 | Golden Reel Awards | Best Sound Editing – Television Episodic | Amber Funk (music editor) | Nominated | |
| 2010 | Shorty Awards | Entertainment | CastleTV | Nominated | |
| 2010 | Shorty Awards | Entertainment | WriteRCastle | Nominated | |
| 2010 | Shorty Awards | Celebrity | Nathan Fillion | Won | |
| 2011 | TV Guide Magazine's Fan Favorites Awards | Favorite Couple Who Should | Nathan Fillion and Stana Katic | Won | |
| 2011 | TV Guide Magazine's Fan Favorites Awards | Favorite Drama Series | Castle | Won | |
| 2011 | Shorty Awards | Best Actor | Nathan Fillion | Nominated | |
| 2011 | Shorty Awards | Writer | Richard Castle | Nominated | |
| 2011 | Shorty Awards | Best Actress | Stana Katic | Won | |
| 2012 | People's Choice Awards | Favorite TV Crime Drama | Castle | Won | |
| 2012 | People's Choice Awards | Favorite TV Drama Actor | Nathan Fillion | Won | |
| 2012 | PRISM Awards | Performance in a Drama Episode | Stana Katic and Jon Huertas | Won | |
| 2012 | PRISM Awards | Drama Series Episode – Mental Health | Castle / "Kill Shot" | Won | |
| 2012 | TV Guide Magazine's Fan Favorites Awards | Favorite Couple | Nathan Fillion and Stana Katic | Won | |
| 2012 | Shorty Awards | TV show | Castle | Nominated | |
| 2012 | Shorty Awards | Best Actress | Stana Katic | Nominated | |
| 2012 | Shorty Awards | Best Actor | Nathan Fillion | Won | |
| 2012 | Shorty Awards | Fashion | Luke Reichle | Won | |
| 2012 | ALMA Awards | Favorite TV Actor Supporting Role in a Drama | Jon Huertas | Won | |
| 2013 | People's Choice Awards | Favorite TV Crime Drama | Castle | Won | |
| 2013 | People's Choice Awards | Favorite TV Drama Actor | Nathan Fillion | Won | |
| 2013 | People's Choice Awards | Favorite TV Drama Actress | Stana Katic | Nominated | |
| 2013 | Golden Reel Award | Best Sound Editing – Short Form Music in Television | Castle / "The Blue Butterfly" | Nominated | |
| 2013 | TV Guide Magazine's Fan Favorites Awards | Favorite Couple | Nathan Fillion and Stana Katic | Won | |
| 2013 | Imagen Awards | Best Primetime Television Program | Castle | Won | |
| 2013 | Imagen Awards | Best Actor | Jon Huertas | Won | |
| 2014 | People's Choice Awards | Favorite TV Crime Drama | Castle | Won | |
| 2014 | People's Choice Awards | Favorite TV Drama Actress | Stana Katic | Won | |
| 2014 | People's Choice Awards | Favorite TV Bromance | Kevin Ryan and Javier Esposito | Nominated | |
| 2014 | People's Choice Awards | Favorite On-Screen Chemistry | Richard Castle and Kate Beckett | Nominated | |
| 2014 | TV Guide Magazine's Fan Favorites Awards | Favorite actor | Nathan Fillion | Won | |
| 2014 | TV Guide Magazine's Fan Favorites Awards | Favorite actress | Stana Katic | Won | |
| 2015 | People's Choice Awards | Favorite TV Crime Drama | Castle | Won | |
| 2015 | People's Choice Awards | Favorite Crime Drama TV Actor | Nathan Fillion | Won | |
| 2015 | People's Choice Awards | Favorite Crime Drama TV Actress | Stana Katic | Won | |
| 2015 | People's Choice Awards | Favorite TV Duo | Nathan Fillion and Stana Katic | Nominated | |
| 2015 | Imagen Awards | Best Primetime Television Program – Drama | Castle | Nominated | |
| 2015 | Teen Choice Awards | Choice TV Show: Drama | Castle | Nominated | |
| 2015 | Teen Choice Awards | Choice TV Actor: Drama | Nathan Fillion | Nominated | |
| 2016 | People's Choice Awards | Favorite TV Crime Drama | Castle | Nominated | |
| 2016 | People's Choice Awards | Favorite Crime Drama TV Actor | Nathan Fillion | Won | |
| 2016 | People's Choice Awards | Favorite Crime Drama TV Actress | Stana Katic | Won | |

== Other media ==
=== DVD releases ===
| DVD name | Release dates | | | Episodes | Discs | Special features |
| DVD name | Region 1 | Region 2 | Region 4 | Episodes | Discs | Special features |
|---|---|---|---|---|---|---|
| 1 | September 22, 2009 | May 6, 2010 (German); November 21, 2011 (UK) | March 10, 2010 | 10 | 3 | Misdemeanors: Bloopers & Outtakes, Whodunit: The Genesis of Castle, Castle's Godfather, exclusive audio commentaries and Write-Along with Nathan Fillion |
| 2 | September 21, 2010 | March 24, 2011 (German); April 16, 2012 (UK) | December 1, 2010 | 24 | 5 | ABC Starter Kit, On Set with Seamus and Jon, On Location with Nathan, Manhattan's Most Unusual Murders, Misdemeanors: Bloopers & Outtakes, deleted scenes and music videos |
| 3 | September 20, 2011 | November 24, 2011 (France); August 6, 2012 (UK) | October 12, 2011 | 24 | 5 | Deleted Scenes and Bloopers, Murder They Wrote, Castle Goes Hollywood, Murder Board 101, Cast and Crew Commentary, Music Video – "Get on the Floor" |
| 4 | September 11, 2012 | December 5, 2012 (German); March 25, 2013 (UK) | November 14, 2012 | 23 | 5 | "Nathan & Friends: Castle Goes Radio", "Anatomy of a Stunt", Audio commentaries, deleted scenes, and bloopers. |
| 5 | September 10, 2013 | November 11, 2013 | November 6, 2013 | 24 | 5 | Deleted Scene: Are We Dating?, Martha's Master Class, Lot Cops, Your Home is Your Castle, Gag reel. |
| 6 | September 16, 2014 | November 17, 2014 | November 12, 2014 | 23 | 5 | Character Commentary (Need to Know episode) with Detectives Javier Esposito and Kevin Ryan, Castle Karaoke, Castle in a Day with Stana Katic, A Few of Our Favorite Things (including debut an unaired Castle and Kate moment from the season 4 finale), Audio commentaries, deleted scenes, and bloopers. |
| 7 | September 1, 2015 | November 16, 2015 | November 11, 2015 | 23 | 5 | Cast and crew commentary (Driven episode), Cast and crew commentary (Reckoning episode),Raging Heat Webmercial, Definition of Love music video, The Cast Behind The Cast featurette, deleted scenes, and bloopers. |
| 8 | August 23, 2016 | November 14, 2016 | November 2, 2016 | 22 | 5 | Cast commentary (Cool Boys episode), Cast and crew commentary (Heartbreaker episode), The Great Escape featurette based on The Blame Game episode, deleted scenes, and bloopers. |

=== Streaming ===
On October 6, 2021, every episode became available on Hulu, and as of December 2024, they are available on Amazon Prime Video.

=== Syndication ===
In June 2011, TNT acquired exclusive cable rights from Disney-ABC Domestic Television to air the first two seasons of Castle beginning in the summer of 2012. In advance of the series' fourth season, TNT broadcast an eight-hour marathon of episodes on September 15, 2011, including five from season 3. Castle began airing on TNT every Wednesday beginning September 26, 2012. Castle also began airing in broadcast syndication on weekends beginning September 29, 2012.

The series joined Lifetime lineup beginning on October 5, 2021.

=== Tie-in works ===
In the series, Castle writes a novel titled Heat Wave. As a tie-in, ABC and sister publisher Hyperion Books released that novel as a real book with "Richard Castle" as the author. It is entirely in character, from the dedication to the acknowledgments, although the latter mentions the principal cast and the show's creators by first name. ABC released the first half of the novel in weekly increments on their website. The complete novel was published in September 2009 as a hardcover, debuting at No. 26 on The New York Times Best Seller list. In its fourth week on the list, Heat Wave broke into the top 10 at No. 6. Heat Wave was released in paperback on July 27, 2010, and debuted at No. 34 on The New York Times Best Seller Paperback Mass-Market list. It once again appeared on The New York Times Best Seller list on May 27, 2012, at No. 19.

Naked Heat, the sequel to Heat Wave, was released on September 28, 2010. Naked Heat debuted at No. 7 on The New York Times Best Seller list. As they did with Heat Wave, ABC released a series of the early chapters online as a promotional tool. A third novel, titled Heat Rises, was released on September 20, 2011. It debuted at No. 1 on The New York Times Best Seller list on October 9, 2011 and at No. 5 on the USA TODAY Best-Selling Books list.

The season three finale introduced a graphic novel based on Castle's previous novel character, Derrick Storm. Castle: Richard Castle's Deadly Storm was published by Marvel Comics on September 28, 2011. It debuted at No. 3 on The New York Times Best Seller list on October 16, 2011. This has been followed by three more graphic novels, published a year apart.

A fourth novel, titled Frozen Heat, was released on September 11, 2012, and debuted on The New York Times Best Seller list at No. 7 on September 23, 2012. The fifth Nikki Heat novel Deadly Heat was released September 17, 2013, and debuted at No. 8 on The New York Times Best Seller list. Raging Heat, the sixth novel, was released on September 16, 2014. It landed on No. 6 on The New York Times Hardcover Fiction Best Seller list and on No. 17 on The New York Times Combined Print and E-Book Fiction bestseller list on October 5, 2014. The seventh novel, Driving Heat, was released on September 15, 2015. It debuted on The New York Times Hardcover Fiction Best Seller list at No. 13 on October 4, 2015.

On May 20, 2016, it was announced that two more novels would be published in the Nikki Heat series, even though the show itself had been canceled. The eighth book in the series, High Heat, was published on October 25, 2016. The ninth, Heat Storm, was released in May 2017.

In July 2018, a 10th Nikki Heat book was announced. Crashing Heat was published by Kingswell, a division of Disney Books, on March 12, 2019, almost three years after the TV series ended.

In February 2012, Hyperion announced three e-book novellas as part of Richard Castle's famous Derrick Storm series. The first novella of the series, A Brewing Storm, was released in digital media on May 1, 2012. It debuted at No. 13 on The New York Times E-Book Fiction Best Seller list, as well as No. 18 on The New York Times Combine Prints & E-book Fiction list on May 20, 2012. On July 3, 2012, the second novella of the new Derrick Storm books, A Raging Storm, was released in e-book format. It landed on The New York Times Best Seller e-books list at #19 and at No. 31 for the combined Prints & E-book list, both on July 22, 2012. The final Derrick Storm novella, A Bloody Storm, was released on August 7, 2012. It debuted on The New York Times Best Seller e-books list at #20 and at #34 on the combined Prints & E-book list on August 26, 2012.

=== Video game ===
Castle: Never Judge a Book by its Cover was released on July 9, 2013. The game was available on Steam and could be downloaded on most mobile devices. It is no longer available for download. Players work with Castle and Beckett to find clues and stop a serial killer.

=== Derrick Storm television series ===
On August 20, 2014, ABC announced that the early development stage had begun on a television series centered on Derrick Storm. The series was to have been a CIA procedural written by Gregory Poirier, who was to have executive-produced it with Castle's Andrew Marlowe and Terri Miller. There were no subsequent announcements about a Derrick Storm TV series, indicating that development had concluded.
