= Richard Castle =

Fictional character in the crime series Castle

- Castle character
- Nathan Fillion as Richard Castle
- First appearance: "Flowers for Your Grave"
- Last appearance: "Crossfire"
- Created by: Andrew W. Marlowe
- Portrayed by: Nathan Fillion; Webb Baker Hayes (age 11)

In-universe information
- Full name: Richard Edgar Castle (legal); Richard Alexander Rodgers (birth name)
- Nicknames: Rick, Castle
- Gender: Male
- Occupation: Best-selling author Amateur detective/police consultant Private investigator
- Family: Martha Rodgers (mother); Jackson Hunt (father)
- Spouses: Kate Beckett (wife); Meredith Harper (ex-wife); Gina Cowell (ex-wife)
- Children: Alexis Castle (daughter)
- Relatives: Jim Beckett (father-in-law); Rita (step-mother)
- Nationality: American

Richard Edgar "Rick" Castle (born Richard Alexander Rodgers) is a fictional character on the ABC crime series Castle. He is portrayed by Nathan Fillion.

The name Richard Castle is also used as a pseudonym under which a set of real books about the characters Derrick Storm and Nikki Heat, based on the books mentioned in the television series, are written. These books have achieved success, becoming New York Times bestsellers. Actor Nathan Fillion appears as the face of Richard Castle on the books and on the official website, and participates in book signings. The Castle book series was actually written/ghost-written by screenwriter Tom Straw.

== Creation and development ==
According to Fillion, the character's name "Rick Castle" was noted by the show creator as sounding like "Rich Asshole" and says that this reflects his character. He describes Castle as being "a bit of a douche" with a Peter Pan syndrome stemming from a lack of a "real male adult role model in his life".

Andrew Marlowe explained that he designed Castle's character as one that presents a "storytelling point of view" as a counterpoint to Beckett's evidence-based police work. On casting Fillion to fill the role, Marlowe described Castle as "the right vehicle for the right personality". He also acknowledged the similarity between the Castle/Beckett relationship and the Booth/Brennan relationship of Bones.

== Character overview ==
=== Family life ===
Castle is the father of Alexis Castle and the son of Martha Rodgers, both of whom live with him. His father is a CIA operative who has used the aliases "Jackson Hunt" and "Anderson Cross". Castle's birth name is Richard Alexander Rodgers; he uses Richard Edgar Castle as his nom de plume, (Edgar in honor of Edgar Allan Poe, though he still considers Alexander his middle name). Fillion describes the family dynamic as unconventional because "Castle is very much mothered by his 15-year-old daughter, and at the same time he turns around and mothers his own mother."

As a child, he never knew who his father was. He reasoned that he never missed having a father as he never had anything to miss, and it allowed him to imagine that his father could be anyone he wished. He was looked after by a nanny who spent most of her time watching daytime television. One Life to Live was the inspiration to write his first novel. He was further inspired to become a writer when a man (later revealed to be the father he never knew) handed him a copy of Ian Fleming's Casino Royale at the New York Public Library when he was ten years old. He also claims to have been kicked out of all of New York's finer academic institutions at least once, and to have picked up speed reading while spending his days as a child in the New York Public Library.

Castle has been married and divorced twice. His first wife was Alexis's mother, Meredith (Darby Stanchfield), an impulsive, free-spirited actress, and red-haired like her daughter. She and Richard occasionally meet for a sexual liaison, causing Richard to refer to her metaphorically as a "deep-fried twinkie" (something that is a treat on occasion, but to have it every day would kill you) when she contemplated moving back to New York. His second wife was Gina Cowell (Monet Mazur), his publisher, a role she continues after their divorce. Castle and Gina became involved again, briefly, when she spent a summer with him in the Hamptons supervising his second Nikki Heat novel, but they soon ended their relationship.

Castle has sole custody of his daughter, Alexis. As a result of his own experiences being raised by a nanny, he insisted on raising her himself, made easier by the fact that he works from his large loft apartment shared with his mother. Alexis sometimes seems more mature and responsible than her father, parenting him. Richard takes great care of her, but also likes to play with her.

Castle also plays regular poker games with fellow authors James Patterson, Stephen J. Cannell, Michael Connelly, and Dennis Lehane. When Cannell died in 2010, a fictional mystery writer was invited by Castle to the game, but a seat was left empty in their friend's honor. He also mentions being friends with Jonathan Kellerman, Wes Craven, and Stephen King.

In the fifth season, Castle finally meets his father (portrayed by James Brolin), whom he learns is a spy when he helps him rescue Alexis when she was kidnapped. A Russian enemy of Castle's father seeks revenge for the Russian's murdered wife, so he kidnaps Alexis to lure him out. His father has been checking in on him, his mom, and Alexis their whole lives.

At the end of the final fifth-season episode, Castle proposes marriage to Beckett just as she prepares to reveal her decision on a Washington, DC job offer. The episode ends before she answers. At the beginning of the first sixth-season episode, "Valkyrie", Kate accepts. They are finally married during the seventh season in a private wedding with their family, taking place at Castle's house in the Hamptons.

In the eighth and final season, Beckett estranges herself from Castle in order to protect him from LokSat, a deadly mastermind whom she's after, although they are married still and very much in love. Beckett starts living elsewhere, not letting Castle know about LokSat. After the events of "Mr. And Mrs. Castle" they get back together. Alexis becomes Castle's main helping hand in his P.I. agency. In the series finale, a flash forward to seven years later shows Castle and Beckett are the parents of three children.

=== Writing career ===
Early episodes of the series had Castle voicing over the introductory credits beginning with Season 2.

There are two kinds of folks who sit around thinking how to kill people: Psychopaths, and mystery writers. I'm the kind that pays better. Who am I? I'm Rick Castle... Every writer needs inspiration, and I found mine." [Det. Kate Beckett as Nikki Heat] "And thanks to my friendship with the mayor, I get to be on her case... And together, we catch killers."

Castle is an author of mystery fiction, with 26 bestsellers. His first novel, In a Hail of Bullets, accrued at least 21 rejections before being accepted by a publisher (he keeps the first rejection letter he received framed on his office wall as motivation) and winning the Nom DePlume Society's Tom Straw Award for Mystery Literature. The books have made Castle wealthy; when Alexis is kidnapped he can pay a $3 million ransom. Castle has a large multi-floor Manhattan apartment, a beachfront house in the Hamptons, and luxury cars.

His most popular works are a series starring "Derrick Storm"; A Calm Before The Storm, Gathering Storm, Unholy Storm, Storm's Last Stand, Storm Season, Storm Rising, Storm Warning, and Storm's Break and in the pilot episode, Castle attends a party for the release of the final book in the Storm series, Stormfall, which ends with the surprise death of Derrick Storm, Castle having become bored with the character. He later reads from the novel before a book-signing. Patterson and Cannell both disagree with the decision to kill off Storm, with Cannell commenting that he could have retired or crippled Storm instead, so that he could revisit the character if he changed his mind.

His other books include Death of a Prom Queen, Flowers For Your Grave, Hell Hath No Fury, A Skull at Springtime, At Dusk We Die, When It Comes to Slaughter, and A Rose for Everafter. By his own admission, his early works—Death of a Prom Queen, Flowers For Your Grave, and Hell Hath No Fury—are of poor quality; he points to Hell Hath No Fury in particular, with its plotline of "angry Wiccans out for blood" as being a low point in his career.

After using his friendship with the Mayor to get partnered with NYPD detective Kate Beckett under the pretense of conducting research for a new character, Castle plans a new series of novels starring a new character, a detective based on Beckett. He soon names Beckett's literary alter-ego "Nikki Heat", much to her embarrassment. Beckett takes umbrage at the name, regarding it a "stripper name", and insists that Castle change it, despite his proposing the book titles Summer Heat, Heat Wave, and In Heat. Ultimately, he sticks with the name, and the first novel in the series, Heat Wave, is released to much critical acclaim and financial success. Castle is offered a lucrative contract for three more Nikki Heat novels, with talk in the third season of a movie adaptation. The title of his second Nikki Heat novel, Naked Heat, once again displeases Beckett.

It has been suggested that Castle's interest in death, murder, and the macabre may be the result of a childhood trauma. When Beckett confronts him about it, Castle avoids the question. However, as soon as he tells the story, he admits it is fictional and that it's "[his] job to make stuff up". Later, he admits to his daughter that one of the reasons he writes is to try to understand how criminals could do the things they do. He was under consideration for a deal to write three novels revolving around an unnamed British spy (implied to be James Bond) but rejected the offer, allegedly because his publisher wanted three more Nikki Heat novels and offered him more money, but secretly because accepting would have ended his collaboration with Beckett. In "Hollander's Woods", the source of Castle's interest in murder writing is revealed: in 1983, when he was 11, he found a murdered girl and was confronted by her killer who let him go. The girl's body was never found and she was never identified so no one believed his story. According to Castle, this encounter is what causes him to do what he does: he never was able to solve the mystery of what happened to him in the woods that day so he's driven to solve all the other mysteries he can. In the present of the episode, Castle is confronted by a similar case and finally gets to learn the truth of what happened that day and personally stop a serial killer of an unknown, but presumably large, number of murdered women.

Castle is something of a "method writer", endlessly researching his subjects and acquiring new skills to put himself in the mind of his characters. Amongst the useful skills Castle (and to some extent, partner-in-crime Alexis) have acquired are lock picking, safe cracking, fencing, and a basic grounding in forensic science and criminal psychology. Because he's a writer, although he notoriously shirks "boring paperwork," his ability to speed-read allows him to sift through information faster than most of the precinct (a skill Gates puts to use when hunting for a bomber) and he retains almost everything he reads, especially when it comes to case files (making him the closest approximation to an expert when Jerry Tyson, aka 3XK, returns in Season 7 after stealing his entire case file in Season 6). He also has researched crimes and serial killers, such as the original crime spree of serial killer Jerry Tyson aka The Triple Killer or 3XK for When It Comes to Slaughter. In the pilot episode, "Flowers For Your Grave", Castle displays an uncanny knack for behavioral observation when he observes Beckett and is able to accurately profile her, to which a visibly shaken Beckett responds, "Cute trick."

Kyra Blaine, an ex-girlfriend of Castle to whom he dedicated A Rose for Everafter, told Beckett that Castle only dedicates his books to people he truly cares about.

In "Hollander's Woods", Castle is awarded the Poe's Pen Achievement Award which he says is the highest award a mystery writer can receive. Although shaken by an encounter with the serial killer who inspired his writing interest, Castle accepts the award and dedicates it to his family and friends as he recognizes that, without them, he wouldn't have won it.

=== Police consulting ===
In the pilot episode of Castle, Castle is consulted by Detective Beckett of the NYPD when two victims are murdered in the style of two deaths portrayed in his novels, Hell Hath No Fury and Flowers for Your Grave respectively. Though Beckett wants Castle's access to the case limited, Castle repeatedly defies her instructions in order to see the handiwork of his copycat. Unsatisfied with what he considers a boring resolution to the case, Castle convinces Beckett to continue the investigation, and winds up discovering deeper layers to the crime. While the murders initially appeared to have been committed by the mentally ill client of a social worker who was one of the victims, Castle notes that the murderer did not duplicate the crimes exactly, eliminating the possibility that he was a deranged fan. He realizes that the killer was actually the social worker's brother attempting to frame her client, so that he could inherit his father's money after his death (his father suffering from terminal cancer). By the end of the pilot, Castle enters into a working relationship with Beckett under the pretense of conducting research for his new series of "Nikki Heat" novels.

This relationship is often strained by Castle's luck in personally encountering the suspects, and sneaking in behind breaching teams even after Beckett has ordered him to remain behind; his attempts to follow them once allowing a suspect a chance to escape (although in Castle's defense this was merely because his ex-wife called him on his cell phone during the stake-out rather than any mistakes on his part). Despite this, Castle's familiarity with numerous obscure subjects often gives breakthroughs. His career yields many contacts, including a CIA agent willing to break Agency protocol by telling Castle and Beckett that their current victim was not a CIA agent.

Although he is a proficient marksman (secret until Beckett bets with him on the practice range), he works the cases wholly unarmed (with a few rare, isolated exceptions). While his status as a consultant generally allows him to participate in the 'fun' parts of detective work without worrying about the more tedious details such as paperwork, the team puts him in situations where the criminals request no police involvement, such as to drop off a ransom. Castle still requires official police authority to request information from various sources, and can only question witnesses under supervision.

Beckett often steps in to stop him becoming carried away with wild theories that threaten to obscure the facts. He once speculated that a surgeon had been killed for his involvement in an organ-smuggling ring before they discovered that he was wanted for plastic surgery he had performed for someone in witness protection. Castle's writing career has given him a knack for noting minor details in the situations they investigate, such as when he noted that rent for a victim's apartment had been paid for after her death.

Initially portrayed as jocular and immature, such as having a bulletproof vest made up for himself that says "WRITER" rather than "POLICE", Castle's character deepens as the series progresses. In "Sucker Punch" (S02 E13), while attempting to catch the killer responsible for the death of Beckett's mother over a decade ago, Castle willingly donates $100,000 of his own money for a fake hit, to lure out the killer. He then offers to terminate his partnership with Beckett after she was forced to shoot the real killer, revealed to be a contract assassin silent about his employer. Beckett rejects the offer on the grounds that Castle makes her hard job more fun.

In season 3 "Nikki Heat" (S03 E11), Castle is upset when B-movie actress Natalie Rhodes (Laura Prepon) is cast as Nikki, thinking she is not right for the role. When Rhodes comes onto a case to observe Beckett, Castle is further insulted that she has not read the actual book. Rhodes considers him unimportant to the film and Beckett likes having Natalie around. However, as the case goes on, Rhodes begins to copy Beckett's mannerisms and outfits, complete with brunette wig, annoying Beckett while Castle begins to like her more. At one point, Rhodes kisses Castle, making it clear she wants to sleep with him to feel the character more but Castle turns her down, telling Beckett that sleeping with the actress playing the fictional version of her is "way too meta".

In "Knockdown" (S03 E13), Castle helps Beckett in catching her mother's killer. When Martha points out that he has written 22 books before meeting Beckett but he did not have to go to a police station every day, Castle replied by saying that it is not about the books anymore. Castle and Beckett finally kiss as a ploy to distract a guard, although their reactions imply that they both felt something.

Since then, despite Beckett's then current relationship with another man, they begin spending increasing amounts of time together, with Castle even admitting he is jealous when Beckett agrees to help another writer with his book. In the final episode of Season 3, "Knockout" (S03 E24), Castle finally admits his feelings to Beckett, who is apparently unconscious after being shot while delivering a eulogy at Roy Montgomery's funeral after Montgomery sacrificed himself to atone for his role in the death of Beckett's mother. She claims amnesia after she has recovered from the shooting, refusing the possibility of a relationship while her mother's real killer still walks free.

In season 4, Castle is contacted by a shadowy figure who says that he is a friend of Roy Montgomery and that he has been charged with protecting Beckett in his stead. Castle learns that Montgomery knew who ordered Beckett's mother's death; he had been the one who found out about the kidnappings and offered not to go to the police if Montgomery, Raglan and MacAllister gave him the money they made from the ransoms which has been estimated at several millions of dollars. According to the man, this person has grown powerful enough for the revelation to destroy him. Montgomery had kept files that, should they be revealed would harm the killer and others. The deal was that Montgomery's family and Beckett would be safe if he wanted the files kept secret. Upon his death, he had sent the files to the mysterious man and had charged him with upholding the deal. The only other condition was that Beckett couldn't go near the case or else the deal was off. Castle says that he will keep her reined in. He tells only his mother this information and confides in her as to the deal he made. Martha wants Castle to tell Beckett the truth, but Castle tells her that he can't because Beckett will be killed by the people behind her mother's murder if she keeps digging and that he has to protect her.

In 'Dial M for Mayor' (S04 E12), a mysterious conspiracy is uncovered that was attempting to force Mayor Weldon, Castle's close friend, out of office. The attempt to smear him for embezzlement backfired when a young woman named Laura Cambridge discovered the fact and she was killed. During the case, the mysterious man once again contacts Castle and asks to meet. When they do, he helps him solve the case. However, he later reveals that the conspiracy aimed at the Mayor would have forced Castle out of the 12th Precinct because no one would force Captain Gates to retain him. The man said that they needed Castle to remain at Beckett's side because he was the only one able to keep her away from her mother's case. Castle promises that he will uphold his end of the deal to keep Beckett away from the case.

In "Pandora" (S04 E15) and Linchpin" (S04 E16), the investigation of a murder leads Castle and Beckett to reunite with Sophia Turner (Jennifer Beals), a CIA operative on whom he based a major character. Beckett shows some jealousy at how the two are close and Turner tells Beckett that after she and Rick became involved, it was the beginning of the end of their partnership. The trio work together to stop a plot that could escalate into World War III. However, Sophia turns out to not only be part of the plot but is actually a KGB mole who infiltrated the CIA only to be left on her own when the Soviet Union collapsed. Holding Beckett and Castle at gunpoint, she hints that Castle's father was in the CIA and that was why he gained access years ago. She is killed by a true CIA agent as Beckett and Castle help stop the plot. While mourning Sophia, Castle admits to Beckett that she was much truer to the character he created.

In "47 Seconds" (S04 E19), Beckett reveals to a suspect that she remembered every second of being shot, not realizing that Castle was watching behind the one-way glass mirror. As a result, although Castle tried to hide it, he started to become distant with her, much to Beckett's confusion, concluding that she never mentioned her memory of the event because she didn't return his feelings and didn't want to create an awkward situation.

In the season 4 finale, Castle is concerned when a murder case is connected to the conspiracy behind Beckett's mother and is told by the mystery man that Beckett's life is in danger if she investigates. After failing to warn her off subtly, Castle confesses to Beckett how he's been protecting her and she is outraged over his making decisions for her. He confronts her over how he knows she remembers his declaration of love and they both decide they're done. After nearly dying in a confrontation with the killer and quitting the police force, Beckett comes to Castle's apartment, telling him she could only think of him while on the verge of death and then they later kiss passionately.

The thread of their relationship continues in Season 5, with Castle and Beckett trying (and mostly failing) to conceal their relationship from their co-workers – not simply because of office gossip, but the threat of a misconduct charge being levied by the ever-watchful Captain Gates. In the episode, "Murder, He Wrote" (S05 E04), Ryan accidentally stumbles on the truth while interrogating a suspect, but chooses to keep the truth to himself and respect their privacy. Lanie and Esposito learn the truth in the following episode when Castle was framed for murder (Ryan told Esposito and Beckett told Lanie so that they were aware of the fact that their background research would expose Castle's contact with Beckett outside of case-related matters). In the Season 5 episode "Still" (S05 E22), Captain Gates reveals that she has known about the relationship and has kept quiet since to maintain "plausible deniability", i.e. she cannot report the relationship because she hasn't personally witnessed any behavior to suggest a relationship and is happy to keep up the plausible deniability so long as the pair remain professional on the job.

In the season six episode "Veritas" (S06 E22), after Beckett is framed for murder by the man who had ordered the death of her mother, Castle works to protect her. They are eventually able to clear her name and as a bonus, finally arrest the man Beckett had been after for so long, using hidden evidence Roy Montgomery had left Johanna Beckett.

In episode eleven of season 7, Castle is ordered to leave the NYPD due to co-operating with a mafia don to prove the innocence of one of his underlings suspected of murder, leading to the true murderer being assassinated.

After being restored to his position in the police department, Castle is finally able to bring down old enemy Jerry Tyson, aka serial killer 3XK during "Resurrection" (S07 E14) and "Reckoning" (S07 E15).

In the season seven finale, "Hollander's Woods" (S07 E23), Castle is confronted with his past when a murder surfaces that matches one he saw in his youth. The murder he'd witnessed had been his inspiration to write as because he was never able finish the story of what had happened in the woods when he was a kid, he became driven to finish all the other stories he could find. The investigation leads them to discover a serial killer who has been operating for at least thirty years with an unknown number of victims, all people who won't be missed. The investigation leads them to the identity of the girl Castle saw murdered and a showdown between Castle and the killer after he breaks into the man's barn in search of evidence. Castle is forced to fatally shoot the killer in self-defense with Beckett's gun and brings closure to his victims though the incident leaves him shaken.

=== Private investigator ===
After being banned from the 12th Precinct (S07 E11), Castle completed online courses and became a fully licensed private investigator, hoping that he could still work with the department by conducting his own investigations rather than as part of theirs, but was informed that this planned loophole wouldn't work as he still wasn't allowed to directly come in contact with evidence. He continued to operate as a P.I., but soon found himself dissatisfied with the role, as he was mainly hired for minor cases or people viewing his new career as a 'gimmick' rather than a serious profession; one case saw him hired by someone who wanted him to act as a fake witness to her plans to fake her own death. However, after rescuing Beckett from his old nemesis the Triple Killer, Captain Gates eventually re-hired Castle as a consultant for the 12th precinct-'officially' designating it as community service for interfering in an active case-also reinstating him as Beckett's partner.

After Gates and Beckett are promoted so that Beckett is now captain of the 12th precinct, Castle re-opens Richard Castle Investigations (his private investigator's office) to allow him to take part in investigations due to Beckett's more deskbound role.

== Literature ==
As a promotion for the show, "Richard Castle's" book Heat Wave was released in hardcover by Hyperion on September 29, 2009 and debuted at No. 26 on The New York Times Best Seller list. In its fourth week on the list, Heat Wave broke into the top 10 as No. 6. Heat Wave was released in paperback on July 27, 2010 and debuted at No. 34 on The New York Times best seller Paperback Mass-Market list. The novel features a fictionalized version of the already fictional Richard Castle, named "Jameson Rook", who enters into a partnership with Heat that mirrors Castle's working relationship with Beckett. The second novel, Naked Heat, was released September 28, 2010, and debuted at No. 7 on The New York Times Best Seller list. As with Heat Wave, ABC released a series of early chapters of Naked Heat online. The third Nikki Heat novel, Heat Rises, was released on September 20, 2011. The fourth book in the series, Frozen Heat, was released on September 11, 2012. A graphic novel featuring Derrick Storm titled Deadly Storm, written by Brian Michael Bendis and Kelly Sue DeConnick, with art by Lan Medina, was published by Marvel Comics on September 28, 2011. Hyperion has also published three original Derrick Storm eBook novellas; A Brewing Storm was published in May 2012, A Raging Storm in July, and A Bloody Storm in August.

=== Derrick Storm ===
==== Derrick Storm book list ====
Fictional novels attributed to Richard Castle:

- A Calm Before The Storm
- Storm's Break
- Storm Warning
- Unholy Storm
- Gathering Storm
- Storm Rising
- Driving Storm
- Storm's Last Stand
- Storm Fall
- Storm Approaching

==== Derrick Storm adaptations ====
Graphic novel of earlier fictional novels:

- Deadly Storm (September 28, 2011) (ISBN 978-0-7851-5327-6)
- Storm Season (October 15, 2012) (ISBN 978-0-7851-6482-1)
- A Calm Before Storm (July 16, 2013) (ISBN 978-0-7851-6818-8)
- Unholy Storm (May 7, 2014) (ISBN 978-0-7851-9029-5)

Books featuring the return of Derrick Storm following the events of Storm Fall:

- Derrick Storm trilogy; omnibus audio-book titled Storm Surge (ISBN 978-1-4013-2638-8), omnibus book titled Ultimate Storm (ISBN 978-1-7832-9186-1)
  - A Brewing Storm (May 1, 2012) (ISBN 978-1-4013-0466-9)
  - A Raging Storm (July 3, 2012) (ISBN 978-1-4013-0467-6)
  - A Bloody Storm (August 7, 2012) (ISBN 978-1-4013-0468-3)
- Storm Front (May 21, 2013) (ISBN 978-1-4013-2490-2)
- Wild Storm (May 23, 2014) (ISBN 978-1-4847-1142-2)
- Heat Storm (May 2, 2017) (ISBN 978-14847-8786-1)

=== Nikki Heat ===
Like Castle, the Nikki Heat novels are set in New York City. The title character, Nikki Heat, is based on Castle's partner, Kate Beckett. The first book, Heat Wave, was initially published on September 29, 2009. It reached the No. 6 spot in its fourth week on the New York Times bestseller list. The second book, Naked Heat, was released on September 28, 2010. It debuted at No. 7 on the Times list. The third book, Heat Rises, was released on September 20, 2011. It debuted on the Times list on October 9 at No. 1. The fourth book was released on September 11, 2012, and debuted at No. 7 on September 23. The fifth Nikki Heat novel, Deadly Heat, was released September 17, 2013, and debuted at No. 8 on the New York Times bestseller list.

==== Nikki Heat book list ====
- Heat Wave (September 29, 2009) (ISBN 978-1-4013-2382-0)
- Naked Heat (September 28, 2010) (ISBN 978-1-4013-2402-5)
- Heat Rises (September 20, 2011) (ISBN 978-1-4013-2443-8)
- Frozen Heat (September 11, 2012) (ISBN 978-14013-2444-5)
- Deadly Heat (September 17, 2013) (ISBN 978-14013-2480-3)
- Raging Heat (September 16, 2014) (ISBN 978-14013-2481-0)
- Driving Heat (September 15, 2015) (ISBN 978-14013-2482-7)
- High Heat (October 25, 2016) (ISBN 978-14847-8150-0)
- Heat Storm (May 2, 2017) (ISBN 978-14847-8786-1)
- Crashing Heat (Mar 12, 2019) (ISBN 978-1368040525)

==== Nikki Heat fictional characters ====
- Detective Nikki Heat is loosely based on NYPD detective Kate Beckett, with a similar backstory. Her decision to become a detective was motivated by the death of someone close to her – although Heat has a niece and siblings that Beckett lacks – and the first case she investigates is adapted from several real cases Castle helped Beckett solve. Heat is assisted by sometimes-lover journalist Jameson Rook, and colleagues, Detectives Raley and Ochoa. Originally a theater major at Northeastern University, Nikki switched her major to criminal justice after her mother's murder. She is a practitioner of Brazilian jiu-jitsu, and often spars with Don, her Navy SEAL combat trainer-with-benefits until his murder in Frozen Heat. Nikki carries the NYPD-issue SIG-Sauer P226 DAO as her duty weapon (unlike Beckett, who uses the Glock 19). She lives at an apartment in the Gramercy Park neighborhood of Manhattan. At the end of Raging Heat, Rook proposes, and the two are married in the epilogue of Driving Heat by their friend and frequent poker buddy, Judge Horace Simpson. In Frozen Heat, Nikki learns that her murdered mother, Cynthia Heat (née Trope), was a CIA agent who worked as a piano tutor for the children of various foreign nationals, and that she was murdered because she had uncovered a terrorist plot. After ten years, Nikki was able to close the case and bring her mother's killer to justice. Although Nikki passes the Lieutenant's exam with flying colors in Heat Rises, she declines the promotion in order to remain a homicide detective. She is promoted to captain of the 20th Precinct in Raging Heat after the death of Captain Wallace Irons. Although she had a little bit of a rough start as Precinct Commander in Driving Heat, Nikki eventually finds her footing. It is mentioned in High Heat that Nikki has spent her entire career at the 20th, first as a rookie beat cop, then as a patrol sergeant, followed by detective and detective squad leader, and culminating in her current rank as captain. Nikki and Rook also made a cameo appearance in Richard Castle's Derrick Storm novel, Storm Front, where they interviewed Storm after he was detained by the NYPD for being in the room with a dead body. After the events of High Heat, Nikki is offered the position of Director of Homeland Security by Presidential candidate Senator Lindsy Gardner, a position she is highly encouraged to accept by the Commissioner and Zach Hamner. She also works alongside Derrick Storm to unravel the mystery of why her mother actually faked her own death in 1999.
- Jameson Alexander Rook is a fictional character Richard Castle created for his Nikki Heat series of crime novels. He is a famous two-time Pulitzer Prize-winning magazine journalist who shadows the main character, Detective Nikki Heat, and is her on-again off-again love interest. He was shot by a dirty cop in Heat Rises and spent the beginning of the next novel, Frozen Heat, recovering. He proposes to her at the end of Raging Heat, and the two are married in the epilogue of Driving Heat by their friend and frequent poker buddy, Judge Horace Simpson. The character moonlights as a romance novelist under the pen name Victoria St. Clair. He is based on Castle himself and the way he works with Kate Beckett. Rook and Heat also made a cameo appearance in Richard Castle's Derrick Storm novel, Storm Front, where they interviewed Storm after he was detained by the NYPD for being in the room with a dead body. Both Rook and Storm noted each other's rugged handsomeness.
- Captain Charles Montrose is the captain of the 20th Precinct, based on Captain Montgomery. Prior to taking command of the 20th Precinct, he worked as a homicide detective at the 41st Precinct in the Bronx. He is a widower; his wife, Pauletta, was killed by a drunk driver while crossing the street. Captain Montrose was murdered in Heat Rises, and after Det. Heat proved it wasn't a suicide, he was given a funeral with full honors.
- Detective Miguel Ochoa is based on Detective Esposito. While working with Raley, their nickname is "Roach". After Det. Heat's promotion to captain, she names Ochoa and Raley co-lead detectives of the 20th Detective Squad.
- Detective Sean Raley is based on Detective Ryan, and is coined "King of All Surveillance Media" by Det. Heat. While working with Ochoa, their nickname is "Roach". After Det. Heat's promotion to captain, she names Raley and Ochoa co-lead detectives of the 20th Detective Squad.
- Dr. Lauren Parry is a medical examiner with the Office of Chief Medical Examiner of the City of New York and one of Det. Heat's closest friends, based on Dr. Lanie Parish.
- Margaret Rook is Jameson Rook's mother, based on Richard Castle's own mother Martha Rodgers. Margaret is a 60-something-year-old Tony Award-winning Broadway diva.
- Detective Randall "Randy" Feller is a member of the NYPD Taxi Squad in Heat Rises. He transferred to Det. Heat's homicide team before the events of Frozen Heat.
- Detective Daniel "Dan" Rhymer is a former military policeman from the Carolinas, nicknamed "Opie", who now works in the burglary division of the 20th Precinct. Det. Heat often borrows him for high-profile investigations to the point where he eventually became a full-time member of the squad.
- Detective Inez Aguinaldo, a member of the Southampton Police Department who assisted Det. Heat during the events of Raging Heat. She transferred to the NYPD's 20th Precinct in Driving Heat after Heat was promoted to captain.
- Detective Benigno DeJesus is the lead member of the 20th Precinct's Evidence Collection Team and a valued colleague of Det. Heat.
- Zach Hamner, aka "the Hammer", is the Senior Administrative Aide to the Deputy Commissioner of Legal Matters. A powerful member of the NYPD, Hamner felt personally snubbed by Det. Heat when she turned down the promotion to lieutenant. He has since become 1PP's point man when it comes to Capt. Heat and her precinct. In Heat Storm, he strongly urges Capt. Heat to accept Presidential candidate Lindsy Gardner's offer to become Director of Homeland Security in anticipation of all the federal assistance she could provide the NYPD with in that position.
- Captain Wallace "Wally" Irons, first introduced in Heat Rises is an administrator and bureaucrat who took command of the 20th Precinct after the death of Captain Montrose. He was not very well-liked or respected by Det. Heat, especially after he began sleeping with precinct Detective Sharon Hinesburg, and is constantly about looking good to the public and the NYPD brass. He was killed in an explosion in Raging Heat, prompting Heat to succeed him as precinct commander. The character is a parody of Capt. Victoria 'Iron' Gates from the series.
- Detectives Malcolm and Reynolds, first introduced in Naked Heat . On loan from Burglary Division, they are considered to be as formidable a team as Raley and Ochoa. Their names are taken from the character played by Nathan Fillion in the TV show Firefly.
- Senator Lindsy Gardner, a librarian-turned-politician who ran for President of the United States in 2016 against Republican Caleb Brown and Independent Legs Kline. During her campaign, she asked Capt. Nikki Heat to serve in her Cabinet as Director of Homeland Security.

=== Other fictional novels ===
- In a Hail of Bullets (winner of the Nom DePlume Society's Tom Straw Award for Mystery Literature)
- Death of a Prom Queen
- Flowers For Your Grave
- Hell Hath No Fury
- A Skull at Springtime
- At Dusk We Die
- When It Comes to Slaughter
- A Rose for Everafter
- Dead Man's Chest
- Bullets and Bracelets
- Kissed and Killed
- One Bullet, One Heart

=== "Mystery" of the Castle ghost writer ===
The ABC network was able to successfully conceal the true identity of the ghost-writer of the Castle book series throughout the eight years of the program's production from 2009 through 2016, allowing the mystery of the true identity of this individual to then remain as an intriguing part of the over-all "Castle myth". In 2010, the hint was dropped, when the "Nom de Plume Society", and the "Tom Straw Mystery Writer's Award", were apparently created to fete actor Nathan Fillion with said award; however, at that point in time, the general public remained unaware of the connection. The general mystery persisted regarding the ghost-writer's true identity, despite the fact that some then proposed the possibility that therefore Straw must be the true ghost-writer. The ghost-writer's name was only finally fully revealed after the series production was discontinued in 2016. It was then officially acknowledged that the Castle book series was indeed entirely written by a ghostwriter and that established screenwriter Tom Straw wrote the first seven.
