= Kate Beckett =

- Castle character
- Stana Katic as Det. Kate Beckett in "Under the Gun"
- First appearance: "Flowers for your Grave"
- Last appearance: "Crossfire"
- Created by: Andrew W. Marlowe
- Portrayed by: Stana Katic

In-universe information
- Full name: Katherine Houghton Beckett
- Occupation: NYPD homicide detective (Seasons 1-5, 6 (Episodes 4-23), 7); U.S. Attorney General's office agent (Season 6 (Episodes 1-3)); NYPD captain (Season 8)
- Family: Jim Beckett (father); Johanna Beckett (mother, deceased)
- Spouses: Richard Castle (husband); Rogan O’Leary (ex-husband; annulled)
- Children: Alexis Castle (step-daughter)
- Relatives: "Jackson Hunt" (father-in-law); Martha Rodgers (mother-in-law)
- Nationality: American

Katherine Houghton "Kate" Beckett is a fictional character of the ABC crime series Castle. She is portrayed by Stana Katic.

== History ==
Katherine Houghton "Kate" Beckett, the daughter of Jim and Johanna Beckett, was raised in Manhattan.

Kate went to Stuyvesant High School, a public school in New York City reserved for highly gifted students. She then studied pre-law at Stanford University, dreaming of becoming the first female Chief Justice of the Supreme Court, before transferring to New York University after her mother's death to pursue a career in law enforcement. Between her junior and senior year of college, she spent a semester studying in Kyiv, Ukraine.

=== Her mother's murder ===
On January 9, 1999, when Kate was 19, her mother, Johanna, was stabbed to death while on her way to meet with Jim and Kate for dinner. The detective in charge of the investigation, Detective John Raglan, was apparently never able to find the killer and attributed her death to a random act of gang violence. Kate, though, believes that there was more to her mother's murder than a random killing. Her father took Johanna's death hard and became an alcoholic. She was eventually able to help her father get through it. She since wears her mother's wedding ring as a necklace for "the life she lost" and her father's watch for "the life she saved". Johanna's death inspired Kate to become a detective.

== Career ==
After graduating from college, Kate had enrolled in the New York City Police Academy. She was sworn into the New York City Police Department and assigned to the 12th Precinct as a probationary patrol officer; her training officer was Mike Royce (Jason Beghe). His stories and influence in her life later led to her falling in love with him.

Kate became the youngest woman on the force to be appointed Detective 3rd Grade. By 2009, Beckett was the lead detective of the 12th Precinct's Detective Squad, specializing in murder investigations. She worked with fellow detectives Javier Esposito (Jon Huertas) and Kevin Ryan (Seamus Dever) and medical examiner Lanie Parish (Tamala Jones) under Captain Roy Montgomery (Ruben Santiago-Hudson).

In "Always", Beckett resigns from the NYPD after nearly losing her life trying to apprehend Cole Maddox, the sniper who shot her the previous year at Captain Montgomery's funeral. Over the next few days, she learns that Maddox was working for US Senator William H. Bracken (Jack Coleman), who was the ultimate mastermind behind her mother's murder. She asks for her old job back, and because her resignation wasn't processed, Captain Gates allowed her to remain on the force after serving out the suspension she was assigned for disobeying orders.

In "The Human Factor", Beckett is headhunted by Jerry Stack, a special investigator for the Office of the United States Attorney General, who offers her a job in Washington, D.C. where she will work on the most challenging and sensitive cases in the country. After talking it over with Castle, she decides to accept the job. However, although Beckett made a positive impression on her colleagues for her investigative skills, she soon found herself unable to make the necessary moral compromises for her new role, jeopardizing a plan to infiltrate a major crime syndicate to protect a young woman who would have been forced to act as the mole. As a result, Beckett was fired, leaving her briefly unemployed due to station budget cuts preventing Gates from simply re-hiring her. Despite this, Castle was able to get her job back after he helped to reunite a prominent politician with his long-lost daughter in "Number One Fan", the city official wanting to thank the team for their role in bringing his family together.

In 2015, Beckett took the Captain's exam, which she passed with flying colors. She is also investigated as a possible candidate for the New York State Senate. Beckett ultimately turned down the chance to run for Senate and accepted the promotion to Captain, and was assigned to command the 12th Precinct after Gates was promoted to Deputy Chief and reassigned to One Police Plaza.

As seen in "Knockout" and "Veritas", Beckett is a recipient of the New York City Police Department Medal of Honor, the NYPD Unit Citation with a wreath, and the NYPD Longevity Service Bar with numeral "10".

== Reception ==
For her portrayal of Kate Beckett, Stana Katic was nominated at the 2009 Satellite Awards for Best Actress in a Drama Series and won in 2012 the PRISM Award for Best Performance in a Drama Episode.

Beckett was listed in AfterEllen.com's Top 50 Favorite Female TV Characters. Radio Times included her in its list of the Ten Strong TV Women. She was included in TV Guide's list of "TV's Sexiest Crime Fighters". Her relationship with Castle was recognized by two TV Guide Awards for "Favorite Couple Who Should" in 2011, and "Favorite Couple" in 2012.
