= Castle season 6 =

Castle
- Season 6
- DVD cover
- Starring: Nathan Fillion; Stana Katic; Jon Huertas; Seamus Dever; Tamala Jones; Molly C. Quinn; Susan Sullivan; Penny Johnson Jerald
- No. of episodes: 23

Release
- Original network: ABC
- Original release: September 23, 2013 – May 12, 2014

Season chronology
- ← Previous; Season 5 Next → Season 7

The sixth season of American crime-comedy-drama television series Castle, was ordered on May 10, 2013, by ABC via Twitter. The season aired from September 23, 2013, to May 12, 2014, in the United States on ABC. The season consisted of 23 episodes.

== Overview ==
Richard Castle (Fillion) is a famous mystery novelist who has killed off the main character in his popular book series and has writer's block. He is brought in by the NYPD for questioning regarding a copy-cat murder based on one of his novels. He is intrigued by this new window into crime and murder, and uses his connection with the mayor to charm his way into shadowing Detective Kate Beckett (Katic). Castle decides to use Beckett as his muse for Nikki Heat, the main character of his next book series. Beckett, an avid reader of Castle's books, initially disapproves of having Castle shadow her work, but later warms up and recognizes Castle as a useful resource in her team's investigations.

== Cast ==
=== Main cast ===
- Nathan Fillion as Richard Castle
- Stana Katic as Det. Kate Beckett
- Jon Huertas as Det. Javier Esposito
- Seamus Dever as Det. Kevin Ryan
- Tamala Jones as Dr. Lanie Parish
- Molly C. Quinn as Alexis Castle
- Susan Sullivan as Martha Rodgers
- Penny Johnson Jerald as Captain Victoria Gates

=== Recurring cast ===
- Arye Gross as Sidney Perlmutter
- Juliana Dever as Jenny Ryan
- Maya Stojan as Tory Ellis
- Jack Coleman as Senator William Bracken
- Myko Olivier as Pi
- Lisa Edelstein as Rachel McCord

=== Guest cast ===
- Yancey Arias as Carl Villante
- Jocko Sims as Matt Hendricks
- Peter James Smith as Agent Richmond
- Joshua Bitton as Detective Grant Sullivan

== Episodes ==
No. overall	No. in season	Title	Directed by	Written by	Original release date (Note: Season six episodes 1–11, 15 and 16 were broadcast one day earlier in Canada. The remaining episodes of the season were broadcast the same day as ABC.)	Prod. code	U.S. viewers (millions)
106	1	"Valkyrie"	John Terlesky	Rob Hanning	September 23, 2013	601	11.46
Beckett accepts Castle's marriage proposal, before moving to Washington DC for her new job, where she begins training and meets her new partner, Rachel McCord (Lisa Edelstein). After six weeks apart, Castle surprises her at her apartment, where he causes some trouble when he attempts to help her with a classified case. Castle returns home to discover that Alexis has brought a new boyfriend, Pi, back from her trip to stay with her. Castle is soon taken into Federal custody, where Beckett tells him he was exposed to a deadly chemical agent and has only one day to live.
107	2	"Dreamworld"	Tom Wright	David Grae	September 30, 2013	602	10.88
With Castle having less than 24 hours before he succumbs to the effects of a deadly toxin, Beckett and McCord race against time to track down both the toxin and the antidote to save him and prevent more people from being killed. Their search takes them deep into a mystery involving a highly classified military base, a secret mission, and a coverup that reaches the very top of the Department of Defense.
108	3	"Need to Know"	Larry Shaw	Elizabeth Beall	October 7, 2013	603	10.51
With Beckett still in D.C., Castle insinuates himself into Ryan and Esposito's latest investigation, the murder of former child star Charlie Reynolds. The case is soon taken over by Beckett and McCord when evidence ties Charlie to the Russian mafia, and Beckett is confronted with an ethical dilemma that ultimately costs her her job with the Attorney General.
109	4	"Number One Fan"	John Terlesky	Terence Paul Winter	October 14, 2013	604	11.11
Castle is called in to negotiate a hostage crisis involving a murder suspect who will only speak to him, and puts his life in danger when he exchanges himself for two of the hostages. Castle believes she is innocent and discovers she was framed for murder. Gates allows Beckett, fired from her federal job after what happened in the last episode, to assist with the investigation, even though budget cuts have prevented her reinstatement to the precinct. With the case resolved upon the real culprit being apprehended, Beckett is returned to active duty thanks to the support of an influential man met during the investigation who turned out to be the long-lost biological father of the murder suspect.
110	5	"Time Will Tell"	Rob Bowman	Terri Miller & Andrew W. Marlowe	October 21, 2013	605	10.59
The initial suspect in a grisly murder, Simon Doyle (Joshua Gomez), claims to be a time traveler from the future who has come back to prevent a disaster. Castle is intrigued while Beckett is dismissive, but their investigation eventually leads them to the true killer, and events begin to play out eerily similar to Simon's stories.
111	6	"Get a Clue"	Holly Dale	Christine Roum	October 28, 2013	606	10.69
Castle and Beckett are called to investigate a murder where the victim was left in a crucified position, and discover her death was related to the search of a Freemason treasure. Meanwhile, Castle's relationship with Alexis breaks down when he insults Pi.
112	7	"Like Father, Like Daughter"	Paul Holahan	Marc Dube	November 4, 2013	607	10.87
Alexis and a professor are investigating the case of a man on death row in Pennsylvania, and when his exoneration is denied, with only three days until the sentence is carried out, she enlists Castle's help, even though she is still angry at him. When they begin to dig into the case, they encounter resistance from the townspeople, but with help from Beckett and the team, they uncover details that the local police overlooked, and find that the situation is much more complicated than it looked.
113	8	"A Murder is Forever"	Bill Roe	Chad Gomez Creasey & Dara Resnik Creasey	November 11, 2013	608	10.05
Castle and Beckett investigate the murder of a popular couples' and relationship therapist. At first they believe the killer might have wanted her high-profile client list. Though, after further investigation it seems that he was after a rare, and pricey object that was in her possession.
114	9	"Disciple"	Rob Bowman	David Amann	November 18, 2013	609	10.93
A murder victim bears an exact resemblance to Lanie. Investigation soon leads to another victim who resembles Esposito. The only connection between the two victims is plastic surgeon Dr. Kelly Nieman (Annie Wersching), who apparently has no motive. Castle believes this has something to do with Jerry Tyson (known as the Triple X Killer) whom everyone but Castle believes to be dead. The team discovers too late that the Lanie and Esposito doubles were used to destroy all evidence of Tyson's crimes before they were murdered by his acolytes. Nieman escapes before she can be apprehended, leaving behind a flash drive intended for Castle and Beckett. Its seemingly innocuous contents leave Beckett deeply disturbed.
115	10	"The Good, the Bad and the Baby"	John Terlesky	Terri Miller	November 25, 2013	610	11.41
A man stumbles into a church carrying a baby boy before dying from gunshot wounds. When Beckett's team investigates, they discover that the victim was involved in a hostage situation and rigging the lottery.
116	11	"Under Fire"	Paul Holahan	Andrew W. Marlowe & David Amann	January 6, 2014	612	8.83
The team searches for a murderous arsonist when it is learned that the victim of a building fire was shot to death. Meanwhile, Ryan's wife Jenny (Juliana Dever) goes into labor, as he and Esposito become trapped in the latest fire.
117	12	"Deep Cover"	Tom Wright	Terence Paul Winter	January 13, 2014	613	9.03
Jackson Hunt (James Brolin) returns to New York City with a mission to locate an Iranian intelligence officer. Disavowed by the CIA, he becomes the prime suspect in the murder of a computer hacker, with the investigation being led by Beckett.
118	13	"Limelight"	Bill Roe	Rob Hanning	January 20, 2014	611	8.96
The 12th Precinct takes the case of Mandy Sutton (Alexandra Chando), a teenage pop star whose rise to fame brought with it media attention. This case started after her body double Claire Samuels was found dead in an alley. Meanwhile, Beckett experiences the perils of being engaged to Castle first-hand when tabloid reports emerge of Castle reuniting with his ex wife.
119	14	"Dressed to Kill"	Jeannot Szwarc	Elizabeth Beall	February 3, 2014	614	10.02
Castle and Beckett investigate a murder in the competitive world of high-end fashion, after magazine editor Matilda King's (Frances Fisher) assistant is found dead.
120	15	"Smells Like Teen Spirit"	Kevin Hooks	Chad Gomez Creasey & Dara Resnik Creasey	February 17, 2014	615	7.75
Castle and Beckett are called in when two teenage girls witness a friend being killed by telekinesis during a video call.
121	16	"Room 147"	Bill Roe	Adam Frost	February 24, 2014	616	8.69
What starts out as a straightforward murder case takes a turn towards the perplexing when three people all confess to the crime – and while all three know details of the murder that only the killer could know, each exonerates the others. Meanwhile, Alexis struggles with her guilt and her newfound independence after her relationship with Pi breaks down.
122	17	"In the Belly of the Beast"	Rob Bowman	Andrew W. Marlowe & David Amann	March 3, 2014	617	8.38
Beckett is recruited for a dangerous undercover operation with the aim of stopping a near-mythical drug baron. With no support, no intelligence and no assistance from Castle, she must unravel a conspiracy that leads back to Senator William Bracken and his bid to become president.
123	18	"The Way of the Ninja"	Larry Shaw	Story by : Christine Roum & Shawn Waugh; Teleplay by : Christine Roum	March 17, 2014	618	9.99
A Japanese woman named Jade is killed while looking for those responsible for her parents' deaths when she was young. Castle finds the murder weapon, but it is taken out of his hand by a ninja. The investigation leads them to a Mr. Saito, who is affiliated with the yakuza. He is killed and Castle and Beckett would also have been killed, but they are saved by Jade's sister, Saya, the ninja. The killer was an American contractor for the yakuza.
124	19	"The Greater Good"	Holly Dale	David Grae	March 24, 2014	619	9.78
A 9-1-1 call leads the team to a Wall Street broker's body. The caller works for the U.S. Attorney's office, alongside Gates' sister Elizabeth (Salli Richardson). The victim was their insider, investigating his boss. He made a $25 million wire transfer, given to him by his boss, and planned to take the money home to Venezuela. However, Elizabeth's partner believed the brokerage still needed investigating and killed him for "the greater good".
125	20	"That '70s Show"	John Terlesky	David Amann	April 21, 2014	620	9.76
Beckett is temporarily put in charge of the precinct while Gates leaves for a conference, and she and Castle are called in when construction workers unearth the remains of 1970s crime boss Vince Bianchi. His consigliere, Harold Leon (Jon Polito), is delusional and thinks it is still 1978. The detectives, with Martha's assistance, must re-create the era in costume and attitude so that Harold will fully cooperate in the cold case with Ryan and Esposito taking on Starsky and Hutch personas. The plan is a disaster when Harold clams up when Esposito breaks character and Gates returns early while the recreation is still going. Harold then tries to kill Vince's successor at a disco and it is discovered he was faking his delusions. Harold admits he forced himself to continue living like it was 1978 because he hoped it would help him discover the truth himself, and reveals he and Vince shared a secret that factored into his boss's death, which provides the clue that allows Castle and Beckett to solve it.
126	21	"Law & Boarder"	Tom Wright	Jim Adler	April 28, 2014	621	10.39
A competitive skateboarder's murder is investigated, which points to the unexplained death of a young boy in the past.
127	22	"Veritas"	Rob Bowman	Rob Hanning & Terence Paul Winter	May 5, 2014	622	9.00
Following the events of "In the Belly of the Beast", Beckett carries out an off-the-books investigation attempting to connect drug baron Vulcan Simmons to presidential candidate William Bracken. She becomes a fugitive when the man she believes can lead her to Bracken is murdered. This forces the elusive Mr. Smith to come out of hiding and reveal a key piece of evidence that could get Bracken brought to justice, if Beckett can find it first before her pursuers find her. When Beckett is caught, she finally finds evidence to arrest Bracken. The evidence is a tape recording Roy Montgomery had left for Beckett's mother, where Bracken confesses to various crimes including planning Johanna Beckett's murder. With the new evidence, Beckett is cleared and she is finally able to close her mother's murder case, arresting Bracken on live TV as he announces his plans to run for president.
128	23	"For Better or Worse"	John Terlesky	Terri Miller & Andrew W. Marlowe	May 12, 2014	623	10.59
With Bracken in custody and a light caseload, Castle and Beckett turn their attention toward finally getting married. However, complications ensue when they discover Beckett has been legally married to another man the last fifteen years. After finally working everything out, tragedy seems to strike when Castle's car is run off the road by an unknown assailant, leaving him apparently trapped in a fiery wreck.

== DVD release ==
Castle: The Complete Sixth Season
Set details	Special features	
23 episodes; 5-disc set; English (Dolby Digital 5.1 Surround); English SDH, Spanish and French subtitles	Bloopers & Outtakes; Deleted Scenes; Audio Commentary; Character Commentary; Castle Karaoke (TBD); Castle in a Day with Stana Katic; A Few of Our Favorite Things	
DVD release dates
Region 1	Region 2	Region 4
September 16, 2014	November 17, 2014	November 12, 2014

== Awards and nominations ==
Award	Category	Nominee	Result	Ref.
People's Choice Awards	Favorite TV Crime Drama	Castle	Won	
People's Choice Awards	Favorite TV Drama Actress	Stana Katic	Won	
People's Choice Awards	Favorite TV Bromance	Kevin Ryan and Javier Esposito	Nominated	
People's Choice Awards	Favorite On-Screen Chemistry	Richard Castle and Kate Beckett	Nominated	
TV Guide Magazine's Fan Favorites Awards	Favorite actor	Nathan Fillion	Won	
TV Guide Magazine's Fan Favorites Awards	Favorite actress	Stana Katic	Won	
