= Castle season 7 =

Castle
- Season 7
- DVD cover
- Starring: Nathan Fillion; Stana Katic; Jon Huertas; Seamus Dever; Tamala Jones; Molly C. Quinn; Susan Sullivan; Penny Johnson Jerald
- No. of episodes: 23

Release
- Original network: ABC
- Original release: September 29, 2014 – May 11, 2015

Season chronology
- ← Previous; Season 6 Next → Season 8

The seventh season of American crime-comedy-drama television series Castle, was ordered on May 8, 2014, by ABC. The season premiered on September 29, 2014, in the United States on ABC, and the finale aired on May 11, 2015. The seventh season initially had 22 episodes. But on October 23, 2014, ABC ordered one more episode, resulting in an episode count of 23 episodes.

== Overview ==
Richard Castle (Fillion) is a famous mystery novelist who has killed off the main character in his popular book series and has writer's block. He is brought in by the NYPD for questioning regarding a copy-cat murder based on one of his novels. He is intrigued by this new window into crime and murder, and uses his connection with the mayor to charm his way into shadowing Detective Kate Beckett (Katic). Castle decides to use Beckett as his muse for Nikki Heat, the main character of his next book series. Beckett, an avid reader of Castle's books, initially disapproves of having Castle shadow her work, but later warms up and recognizes Castle as a useful resource in her team's investigations.

== Cast ==
=== Main cast ===
- Nathan Fillion as Richard Castle
- Stana Katic as Det. Kate Castle
- Jon Huertas as Det. Javier Esposito
- Seamus Dever as Det. Kevin Ryan
- Tamala Jones as Dr. Lanie Parish
- Molly C. Quinn as Alexis Castle
- Susan Sullivan as Martha Rodgers
- Penny Johnson Jerald as Captain Victoria Gates

=== Recurring cast ===
- Maya Stojan as Tory Ellis
- Arye Gross as Sidney Perlmutter
- Juliana Dever as Jenny Ryan
- Matt Letscher as Henry Jenkins

== Episodes ==
No. overall	No. in season	Title	Directed by	Written by	Original release date	Prod. code	US viewers (millions)
129	1	"Driven"	Rob Bowman	David Amann	September 29, 2014	701	10.75
Beckett searches for answers in the aftermath of Castle's accident and discovers that he has been abducted, although evidence points to him as the man behind his abduction and disappearance. When he is found abandoned at sea two months later, he is unable to recall those past two months. Reunited with Beckett, the pair begin to investigate his whereabouts together.
130	2	"Montreal"	Alrick Riley	Andrew W. Marlowe	October 6, 2014	702	9.60
Castle uses some unconventional methods to determine his whereabouts for the last months, while helping Beckett solve the case of a toy company executive who was murdered while undercover at his own factory. A new lead for Castle leads to questions he may not want answered.
131	3	"Clear and Present Danger"	Kate Woods	Chad Gomez Creasey & Dara Resnik Creasey	October 13, 2014	703	9.30
Pool shark Will Fairwick gets impaled inside his apartment. Billiards club owner Fats Shepherd says Will made a deal with the devil and Will believed his end was near. Video footage shows Will's apartment door opening and closing by itself moments after his murder, causing the detectives to wonder if Will was correct. Donna, Will's girlfriend, says he was an MIT student but dropped out due to stress. Will also had a job at an insurance company, which, along with his college enrollment, was a front for a government agency researching cloaking technology. Will wanted to prevent the technology from falling into the wrong hands and was killed for it.
132	4	"Child's Play"	Rob Bowman	Rob Hanning	October 20, 2014	704	8.82
Beckett's team investigate an ice cream man's murder and find evidence that a child may have been a witness, so Castle goes undercover at a local school's second-grade class to find them. They eventually discover that the case is connected to a fake passport ring and a wanted war criminal who sought to escape the country using a fake passport. However, the leader of the ring was a surviving victim of the man and recognized and sought to bring him down. Beckett and Castle are able to locate a picture of the culprit and apprehend him, turning the killer over to the International Criminal Court for trial for his numerous crimes.
133	5	"Meme is Murder"	Bill Roe	Jim Adler	October 27, 2014	705	8.75
The team investigates the murder of web celebrity Abby Smith. The killer then posts photos of her death online and even taunts the police with clues to future murders. Castle believes the killer may have once been cyberbullied. Surveillance video leads them to Adam Lane, who has taken the co-founders of a photo sharing service to a secret location. Lane has set up an online contest for the two, and whoever gets the fewest votes within 60 minutes dies. Using psychological tactics on Lane, Beckett manages to get him to reveal the location – Ryan and Esposito reach the captives in time.
134	6	"The Time of Our Lives"	Paul Holahan	Terri Miller	November 10, 2014	706	9.52
After an explosion involving a mysterious ancient artifact, Castle finds (or imagines) himself in a parallel universe where he and Beckett have never met. He investigates the artifact's disappearance and eventually finds his way back to the real world, where he asks Beckett to marry him straight away. They elope in the Hamptons with only Jim, Martha and Alexis present.
135	7	"Once Upon a Time in the West"	Alrick Riley	Terence Paul Winter	November 17, 2014	707	9.38
When a young woman dies from cardiac arrest due to digoxin poisoning, Castle and Beckett must infiltrate her last-known location – an Arizona dude ranch. Ryan and Esposito are peeved to have been left out of the wedding, but find out that the victim was searching for the hidden treasure of the Peacock Boys, train robbers killed in 1893. Castle and Beckett find the treasure's hiding place, but only skeletal remains are there, and they must apprehend the killer at the dude ranch. With the case solved, Beckett and Castle decide to stay on at the ranch a little longer as an impromptu honeymoon.
136	8	"Kill Switch"	Jeannot Szwarc	David Amann	November 24, 2014	708	9.55
When Esposito follows a murder suspect onto a subway car, only to watch him reveal a bomb strapped to his chest, the rest of the team must investigate the suspect's motive. They discover he also has the potential to release the H5N1 virus to the public.
137	9	"Last Action Hero"	Paul Holahan	Christine Roum	December 1, 2014	709	8.45
When a former action hero is found dead near a theater, it seems he was killed with a garrote for trying to stop a drug lord, but it turns out he was killed to keep a family secret. Meanwhile Beckett moves out of her old house.
138	10	"Bad Santa"	Bill Roe	Chad Gomez Creasey & Dara Resnik Creasey	December 8, 2014	710	7.32
When an ER surgeon who moonlighted as a mob doctor is killed, Castle must use his Mafia connections to solve the case. But when his collaboration with Don Dino Scarpella becomes more widely known, the DA makes Gates sever the department's ties with him.
139	11	"Castle, P.I."	Milan Cheylov	Rob Hanning	January 12, 2015	711	6.77
The 12th Precinct begins to investigate the shooting death of an admissions officer from a prestigious preschool. The team is shocked when Castle arrives at the crime scene with a private investigator license. While Gates persists in demanding that he stay out of their investigation, both he and the team rely on each other's help with the case.
140	12	"Private Eye Caramba!"	Hanelle Culpepper	Adam Frost	January 19, 2015	712	7.60
A telenovela star is murdered, and Castle is hired by her co-star to find a clutch the victim had borrowed. Kate also informs him that the purse could contain a key piece of evidence to solve the crime.
141	13	"I, Witness"	Tom Wright	Terence Paul Winter & Amanda Johns	February 2, 2015	713	7.41
Castle is asked by former schoolmate Eva Whitfield (Brianna Brown) to investigate a possible infidelity by her husband Cole (Ivan Sergei). The 12th Precinct is brought in Castle becomes an eyewitness to her apparent murder by Cole. The unfolding events of the case cause Castle to question continuing his private investigation career.
142	14	"Resurrection"	Bill Roe	David Amann	February 9, 2015	714	7.43
Clues in a murder investigation point to Dr. Kelly Nieman (Annie Wersching) and her connections with 3XK serial killer Jerry Tyson (Michael Mosley). Tyson pretends to be another man who only looks similar, and as he previously stole his own police files, the detectives cannot prove otherwise. Beckett is tricked and captured.
143	15	"Reckoning"	Rob Bowman	Andrew W. Marlowe	February 16, 2015	715	8.47
The 12th Precinct and Castle try to stop Nieman and Tyson from claiming Beckett as their next victim. Castle pursues Tyson seemingly alone, making himself bait; when Tyson arrives to capture Castle, Esposito kills him with a sniper rifle. They track Nieman down to find just after Beckett has escaped and killed her. Castle's ban is lifted and he is reinstated as consultant at the precinct.
144	16	"The Wrong Stuff"	Paul Holahan	Terri Miller	February 23, 2015	716	7.61
Astronaut Tom Richwood is killed during a simulation for a mission to Mars. The operations director says that anyone needing to approach the body needs to wear spacesuits to access the area, with which Castle happily complies. The investigation reveals that someone tampered with the simulator's computer, which ultimately viewed Tom as a threat. A reboot refocuses the computer's wrath on the team.
145	17	"Hong Kong Hustle"	Jann Turner	Chad Gomez Creasey	March 16, 2015	717	8.95
A 12th Precinct investigation crosses paths with a Hong Kong inspector investigating her friend's murder. The hunt is also on for a missing BMW X5 for which the most recent victim was searching. Beckett is prompted to evaluate her goals and priorities in life.
146	18	"At Close Range"	Bill Roe	Jim Adler	March 23, 2015	718	8.04
Ryan is working a second job at his brother-in-law Frank's security service to make money for his daughter's college fund, and is on the job when the congressman he is guarding is wounded and a social worker is killed. The investigation becomes difficult when Frank is implicated. Beckett starts studying for the captain's exam.
147	19	"Habeas Corpse"	Kate Woods	Rob Hanning	March 30, 2015	719	8.16
A clubbing death in an alley leads the team to investigate the world of personal injury lawyers. The team also prepares to square off in a talent contest at a charity event.
148	20	"Sleeper"	Paul Holahan	David Amann	April 20, 2015	720	8.34
A chance encounter prompts Castle to start reliving episodes from his missing two months in his dreams. Investigating leads him to encounters with a Russian hitman; a former schoolmate and sometime terrorist; and the secret agent who forcibly recruited him to aid in the latter's defection, then suppressed his memory of those events.
149	21	"In Plane Sight"	Bill Roe	Dara Resnik Creasey	April 27, 2015	721	8.31
As Castle and Alexis travel to London, their routine flight turns deadly when the plane's Air Marshal is found murdered. With the help of Beckett on the ground, Castle and Alexis race against time to find the killer before they carry out their fateful plan.
150	22	"Dead from New York"	Jeannot Szwarc	Terence Paul Winter	May 4, 2015	722	8.26
The creator of the hit sketch comedy series Saturday Night Tonight (a spoof of Saturday Night Live) named Sid Ross is strangled with his own tie and thrown down an elevator shaft. They come across suspects like volatile star Mickey Franks (Jaleel White) who was the verge of being fired from the show by Sid due to his mood swings, this week's guest host Danny Valentine (Gregory Harrison) who hosted the first episode, ex-con drug dealer Kurt Van Zant (Mark Rolston) who bankrolled the pilot episode and never saw a dime, Sid's widow Evelyn (Janice Kent), and studio page Chad (Dustin Ingram). The show must go on with singer Carly Rae Jepsen making an appearance as the episode's musical guest. Beckett ultimately must arrest the killer, the production company's CEO Gene Vogel (James Eckhouse), on live television during the "Model Cop" segment.
151	23	"Hollander's Woods"	Paul Holahan	Andrew W. Marlowe & Terri Miller	May 11, 2015	723	8.44
Castle is confronted by his past when he gets involved in a case that, for him, stretches back thirty years and was his inspiration to become a writer. Thirty years before, he witnessed a murder, but no body was ever found and no one was reported missing so no one believed him. However, a similar case crops up and Castle jumps on the chance to solve his first mystery with his friends. They are able to eventually identify the girl Castle saw murdered and catch a disturbed man they believe did it. However, while visiting the man's psychiatrist, Castle recognizes his voice instantly – the psychiatrist is the murderer. With the help of Beckett, Castle searches a barn belonging to the psychiatrist and discovers a book of his victims. Castle fights with the killer and ends up being held at knifepoint, and Castle ultimately kills him with Beckett's gun. Meanwhile, Beckett is offered the chance to run for state Senate, as well as the chance to become captain of her own precinct, and Castle is given an award for his writing that he dedicates to his family and friends.

== DVD release ==
Castle: The Complete Seventh Season
Set details	Special features	
23 episodes; 966 minutes; 5-disc set; English (Dolby Digital 5.1 Surround); English SDH, Spanish and French subtitles	Bloopers & Mistakes; Deleted Scenes; Audio Commentary; Raging Heat Webmercial; "Definition of Love" by Shay-Jean The Dynamic Duo; The Cast Behind the Cast	
DVD release dates
Region 1	Region 2	Region 4
September 1, 2015	November 16, 2015	November 11, 2015

== Awards and nominations ==
Award	Category	Nominee	Result	Ref.
People's Choice Awards	Favorite TV Crime Drama	Castle	Won	
People's Choice Awards	Favorite Crime Drama TV Actor	Nathan Fillion	Won	
People's Choice Awards	Favorite Crime Drama TV Actress	Stana Katic	Won	
People's Choice Awards	Favorite TV Duo	Nathan Fillion and Stana Katic	Nominated	
Imagen Awards	Best Primetime Television Program – Drama	Castle	Nominated	
Teen Choice Awards	Choice TV Show: Drama	Castle	Nominated	
Teen Choice Awards	Choice TV Actor: Drama	Nathan Fillion	Nominated	
