= Mangler =

Mangler may refer to:

- Mangler, a person involved in mangling
- "The Mangler", a 1972 short story by Stephen King
- The Mangler (film), a 1995 adaptation of King's story, directed by Tobe Hooper
