= Castle season 5 =

Castle
- Season 5
- DVD cover
- Starring: Nathan Fillion; Stana Katic; Jon Huertas; Seamus Dever; Tamala Jones; Molly C. Quinn; Susan Sullivan; Penny Johnson Jerald
- No. of episodes: 24

Release
- Original network: ABC
- Original release: September 24, 2012 – May 13, 2013

Season chronology
- ← Previous; Season 4 Next → Season 6

The fifth season of American crime-comedy-drama television series Castle, was ordered on May 10, 2012, by ABC. The season aired from September 24, 2012, to May 13, 2013. Two additional episodes were ordered on October 19, 2012, and February 5, 2013, which brought season 5 up to a total of 24 episodes.

== Overview ==
Richard Castle (Fillion) is a famous mystery novelist who has killed off the main character in his popular book series and has writer's block. He is brought in by the NYPD for questioning regarding a copy-cat murder based on one of his novels. He is intrigued by this new window into crime and murder, and uses his connection with the mayor to charm his way into shadowing Detective Kate Beckett (Katic). Castle decides to use Beckett as his muse for Nikki Heat, the main character of his next book series. Beckett, an avid reader of Castle's books, initially disapproves of having Castle shadow her work, but later warms up and recognizes Castle as a useful resource in her team's investigations.

== Cast ==
=== Main cast ===
- Nathan Fillion as Richard Castle
- Stana Katic as Det. Kate Beckett
- Jon Huertas as Det. Javier Esposito
- Seamus Dever as Det. Kevin Ryan
- Tamala Jones as Dr. Lanie Parish
- Molly C. Quinn as Alexis Castle
- Susan Sullivan as Martha Rodgers
- Penny Johnson Jerald as Captain Victoria Gates

=== Recurring cast ===
- Maya Stojan as Tory Ellis
- Arye Gross as Sidney Perlmutter
- Juliana Dever as Jenny Ryan
- Darby Stanchfield as Meredith
- Tahmoh Penikett as Cole Maddox
- Scott Paulin as Jim Beckett
- Jack Coleman as Senator William Bracken
- Dylan Walsh as FBI Agent Harris

== Episodes ==
No. overall	No. in season	Title	Directed by	Written by	Original release date	Prod. code	U.S. viewers (millions)
82	1	"After the Storm"	Rob Bowman	David Amann	September 24, 2012	501	10.45
Castle wakes to find Beckett bringing him coffee in his bedroom. They agree sleeping together was not a one-time mistake and plan to spend the day in bed together, but are interrupted when Martha returns early to the apartment with a hung-over Alexis. Beckett is able to sneak out without being seen. Castle later arrives at Beckett's home, just minutes before Ryan arrives to discuss the Maddox/Smith case. Though she has just resigned, Beckett is drawn back into the investigation. They are able to link Maddox, Smith, and Senator William Bracken (Jack Coleman) together. Beckett deduces that Bracken was responsible for her mother's death and confronts him, threatening to release implicating information to the press if anything should happen to her or anyone she cares about. Captain Gates allows Beckett to return to her job, but makes her complete her suspension.
83	2	"Cloudy with a Chance of Murder"	Kate Woods	Elizabeth Beall	October 1, 2012	503	10.35
The team investigates the death of a television weather forecaster who had discovered that a local manufacturer was using styrene in its carpet-making process and releasing chemicals, causing asthma in local children. Meanwhile, when asked on a date live on-air by entertainment reporter Kristina Coterra (Jodi Lyn O'Keefe), Castle accepts in order to maintain the pretense that he and Beckett are still unattached; this goes horribly awry when Kristina tries to seduce Castle at his loft.
84	3	"Secret's Safe with Me"	John Terlesky	Terence Paul Winter	October 8, 2012	502	10.61
A message scrawled in blood at a crime scene leads Castle and Beckett from a mysterious storage locker to the world of high society. Convinced that the storage locker holds a secret worth killing for, Castle finds evidence within that a socialite's butler was driving the car involved in a fatal hit-and-run accident. Meanwhile, Martha tells Castle that she knows about his relationship with Beckett and wants him to tell Alexis before she moves away from home to a dorm room at Columbia.
85	4	"Murder, He Wrote"	Rob Bowman	David Grae	October 15, 2012	505	10.94
Castle and Beckett plan a secret romantic weekend away in the Hamptons, but their trip turns sour when a dying man stumbles into their swimming pool. Castle is intrigued by the case and Beckett reluctantly follows his lead, knowing that they will not be able to enjoy their weekend until the crime is solved. The trail leads to a retired mobster, Vincent Cardono (Don Stark), a methamphetamine syndicate, and corruption in the police department. Meanwhile, Ryan and Esposito try to find out the identity of Beckett's boyfriend. Ryan discovers Castle and Beckett's relationship, but chooses not to reveal the secret.
86	5	"Probable Cause"	John Terlesky	Andrew W. Marlowe	October 29, 2012	506	10.84
When investigating a brutal ritual killing, Beckett is horrified when the evidence leads her straight to Castle and she is forced to confront the idea that Castle may be capable of murder. As the evidence against him piles up, Castle orchestrates his own prison break when he learns he has been set up by Jerry Tyson, better known as the Triple Killer (3XK). As he becomes the target of a city-wide manhunt, Castle must stay alive long enough for Beckett to catch Tyson before Tyson catches him.
87	6	"The Final Frontier"	Jonathan Frakes	Kate Sargeant	November 5, 2012	507	10.02
One of the fans of a cult science fiction television show is murdered at a fan convention, leaving Beckett and Castle caught between avid fans and celebrity egos. Suspicion turns on the cast of the original show when they learn that the victim was resisting plans to revive the series for modern audiences. This episode contains multiple references to Nathan Fillion's leading role in Firefly (referred to as "that Joss Whedon show"), a short-lived science fiction television show that actually has reached cult status. Director Jonathan Frakes cameos as a Castle fan getting an autograph.
88	7	"Swan Song"	David M. Barrett	Rob Hanning	November 12, 2012	504	10.07
When the body of an up-and-coming rock star is found with his skull bashed in by his favorite guitar, Castle and Beckett begin to probe tensions within his band and his connection to a fanatical religious cult. Meanwhile, a documentary crew that had been following the band around take an interest in their crime-solving partnership and gets permission to record the investigation, prompting everyone—except Beckett—to try to get as much publicity as they can by being the one to solve the case.
89	8	"After Hours"	David M. Barrett	Shalisha Francis	November 19, 2012	508	10.48
Castle and Beckett are pursued by the mob when they are sent to escort the only witness to the murder of a priest into protective custody. Unarmed in the middle of a rough neighborhood and cut off from the 12th Precinct, they must use their wits to evade their pursuers long enough to piece together the evidence and find their one chance at surviving the night before their witness gets them all killed.
90	9	"Secret Santa"	Paul Holahan	Christine Roum	December 3, 2012	509	8.50
When a bearded man in a red suit is found dead in the middle of Central Park, Castle and Beckett realize that they might just be investigating the murder of Santa Claus. As they dig deeper, they uncover a victim who was trying to make amends for a life of shady business deals that might have gotten him killed. Meanwhile, changes in everyone's personal lives spell the end for some Christmas traditions and the birth of new ones.
91	10	"Significant Others"	Holly Dale	Terence Paul Winter	January 7, 2013	510	8.66
Beckett moves in with Castle while her home is being fumigated — at the same time as Castle's ex-wife Meredith moves in because Alexis has fallen ill. And to make it a perfect storm, their latest case is the murder of a high-powered divorce attorney with a reputation for representing jilted women. While Castle gets distracted by the thought of his ex-wife and his girlfriend living in close quarters, the trail of evidence leads them to the mysterious disappearance of a woman in the Caribbean.
92	11	"Under the Influence"	John Terlesky	Elizabeth Beall	January 14, 2013	512	9.14
The release party of an aging pop star's comeback album is spoiled when a young disc jockey is found murdered nearby. As rival record producers war with one another, Castle and Beckett must brave an industry where music idols will do whatever it takes to enjoy another minute in the limelight.
93	12	"Death Gone Crazy"	Bill Roe	Jason Wilborn	January 21, 2013	511	8.82
Beau Randolph, the founder of hit adult video franchise "College Girls Gone Crazy", is found strangled to death, sending Castle and Beckett headlong into the seedy world of pornography. While dealing with blackmailers, rival franchises and fervent protest groups, they discover an ambitious producer who will stop at nothing to keep the franchise alive.
94	13	"Recoil"	Tom Wright	Story by : Rob Hanning & Cooper McMains; Teleplay by : Rob Hanning	February 4, 2013	513	8.89
After years of waiting, Beckett finally gets her chance to take down Senator William Bracken, the man responsible for her mother's murder. Determined not to waste what might be her one and only shot at justice, she throws herself at the case—but Castle knows that there might be much greater forces at work, and that Beckett may not realize that she is in over her head until it is too late. As Beckett wrestles with the conflict between seeking her own personal revenge and her responsibility to see justice served, the 12th Precinct discovers that Bracken has become the target of an assassination and must do everything it can to save him. Once a suspect is taken into custody and the case is closed, Castle and Beckett find inconsistencies at the scene of the crime that suggest their suspect was framed, and that the person after Bracken is still at large and armed with a bomb.
95	14	"Reality Star Struck"	Larry Shaw	David Grae	February 11, 2013	514	8.97
Beckett tries to solve the murder of a popular reality television star, but as she unravels a complicated web of relationships, she discovers that "reality" soon gets left behind in the endless pursuit of ratings. Meanwhile, Castle and Beckett fear that their relationship may be exposed to Gates when Castle's plan of giving a gift to Beckett goes sideways. This episode also stars Gina Torres, who was Fillion's co-star on Firefly.
96	15	"Target"	Bill Roe	David Amann	February 18, 2013	515	9.85
In the first half of a two-part story, Castle and Beckett find themselves in a race against time when they unearth a plot to kidnap Sara el-Masri (Karen David), the daughter of a powerful foreign dignitary. The stakes are raised when they learn that Alexis was also kidnapped, and every lead they follow ends with the discovery of another dead body. Meanwhile, Alexis risks her own life to try to help her friend escape and quickly realises that her father will never find her in America because she has been taken out of the country.
97	16	"Hunt"	Rob Bowman	Andrew W. Marlowe	February 25, 2013	516	10.77
Concluding the two-part story, Castle becomes frustrated with the search for Alexis when the FBI and NYPD are slowed down by bureaucracy. Taking matters into his own hands, he decides to go after Alexis himself. As he ventures into the criminal underworld alone, Beckett realizes that Alexis was the target of the kidnapping to begin with, but is too late to stop Castle from blindly wandering into an ambush. He is saved by a mysterious stranger, an operative of the Special Activities Center of the CIA, calling himself Jackson Hunt (James Brolin), and who reveals himself to be Castle's father. Alexis' kidnapping has been orchestrated by a Russian named Volkov to force Hunt into showing himself so that Volkov can kill him in revenge for the death of Volkov's wife. Having tracked Alexis to Paris but knowing that he could not stop Volkov alone, Hunt brings Castle in and together they confront Volkov to barter for Alexis' life.
98	17	"Scared to Death"	Ron Underwood	Shalisha Francis	March 18, 2013	517	11.26
The malevolent spirit of a serial killer has returned from the grave to wreak unholy vengeance on the people who saw him convicted — or at least that is Castle's belief when he unintentionally watches a "haunted" film connected to the case of a woman who was frightened to death.
99	18	"The Wild Rover"	Rob Hardy	Terence Paul Winter	March 25, 2013	518	10.57
Ryan revives an old undercover alias when evidence in the murder of a baker leads the 12th Precinct back to the Irish mob, only to find that tensions within the mob are about to reach boiling point, culminating in a hostile takeover.
100	19	"The Lives of Others"	Larry Shaw	Terri Miller & Andrew W. Marlowe	April 1, 2013	519	11.79
When an injury leaves him house-bound and bored, Castle becomes convinced that he has witnessed a murder — but with no body, no evidence and no other witnesses, Beckett begins to wonder if his writer's imagination is getting the better of him. While Castle enlists Alexis to help in his off-the-books investigation, Beckett is left to take the case of a murdered IRS agent on her own. Castle's murder case is ultimately revealed to be an elaborate surprise birthday present staged by Beckett, which inspires her to take a closer look at the evidence in her own case.
101	20	"The Fast and the Furriest"	Jonathan Frakes	Christine Roum	April 15, 2013	520	10.18
Evidence at a crime scene suggests that a murderous Bigfoot is stalking the streets of New York City. While Castle indulges in his knowledge of cryptozoology, Beckett, Ryan and Esposito decide to follow much more mundane (but much more realistic) theories, only to hit a wall that makes them wonder if Castle's bizarre theories might actually be right this time.
102	21	"The Squab and the Quail"	Paul Holahan	Story by : Jason Wilborn & Adam Frost; Teleplay by : Jason Wilborn	April 22, 2013 (Note: "Still" was originally scheduled to be broadcast prior to "The Squab and the Quail", but was rescheduled following the Boston Marathon bombing.)	521	11.76
When Beckett takes on a protective detail assignment to investigate an attempt on the life of self-made billionaire Eric Vaughn (guest star Ioan Gruffudd), Castle feels threatened by the man's charm and decides to win Beckett's heart back by solving the case by himself.
103	22	"Still"	Bill Roe	Rob Hanning	April 29, 2013	524	10.53
A routine investigation escalates into a life-or-death situation when Beckett accidentally trips the sensor on a bomb, leaving her unable to move lest it detonate. While Ryan and Esposito search for the bomber to disarm it, Castle stays behind to reassure Beckett the only way he knows how — by testing her patience. (Note: ABC ordered an additional episode late in the production schedule, leaving the creative team with limited time to produce a full episode. Instead, the writers developed a clip-show episode using a few standing sets.)
104	23	"The Human Factor"	Bill Roe	David Amann	May 6, 2013	522	10.84
Mystery surrounds the death of a whistleblower who was killed in a precision military strike. As Beckett tries to stave off interference from the Department of Homeland Security, she attracts the attention of a special investigator for the Attorney General, who offers her a job in Washington, D.C., where she will work on the most challenging and sensitive cases in the country.
105	24	"Watershed"	John Terlesky	Andrew W. Marlowe	May 13, 2013	523	11.16
The team open an investigation into the death of a young woman posing as a prostitute, and soon find themselves facing off against a powerful political dynasty with enough money to escape a murder conviction. Meanwhile, Beckett prepares to leave New York and join the Attorney General's office, but is forced to decide what she really wants in life when Castle proposes to her.

== DVD release ==
Castle: The Complete Fifth Season
Set details	Special features	
24 episodes; 1032 minutes; 5-disc set; English (Dolby Digital 5.1 Surround); English SDH, Spanish and French subtitles	Audio Commentary; Bloopers & Outtakes; Deleted Scenes	
DVD release dates
Region 1	Region 2	Region 4
September 10, 2013	November 11, 2013	November 6, 2013

== Awards and nominations ==
Award	Category	Nominee	Result	Ref.
People's Choice Awards	Favorite TV Crime Drama	Castle	Won	
People's Choice Awards	Favorite TV Drama Actor	Nathan Fillion	Won	
People's Choice Awards	Favorite TV Drama Actress	Stana Katic	Nominated	
Golden Reel Award	Best Sound Editing – Short Form Music in Television	Castle: "The Blue Butterfly"	Nominated	
TV Guide Magazine's Fan Favorites Awards	Favorite Couple	Nathan Fillion and Stana Katic	Won	
Imagen Awards	Best Primetime Television Program	Castle	Won	
Imagen Awards	Best Actor	Jon Huertas	Won	
