= List of Castle characters =

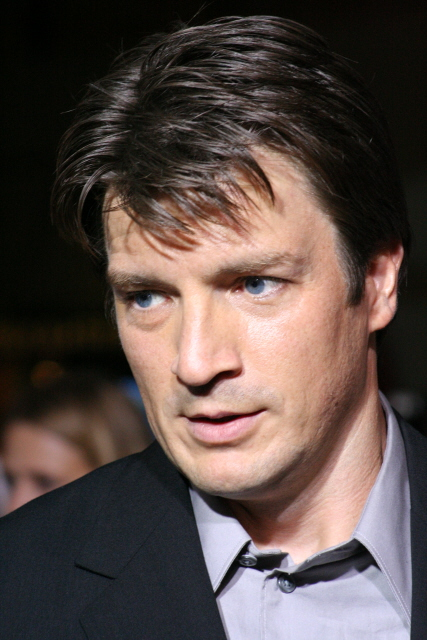
Nathan Fillion

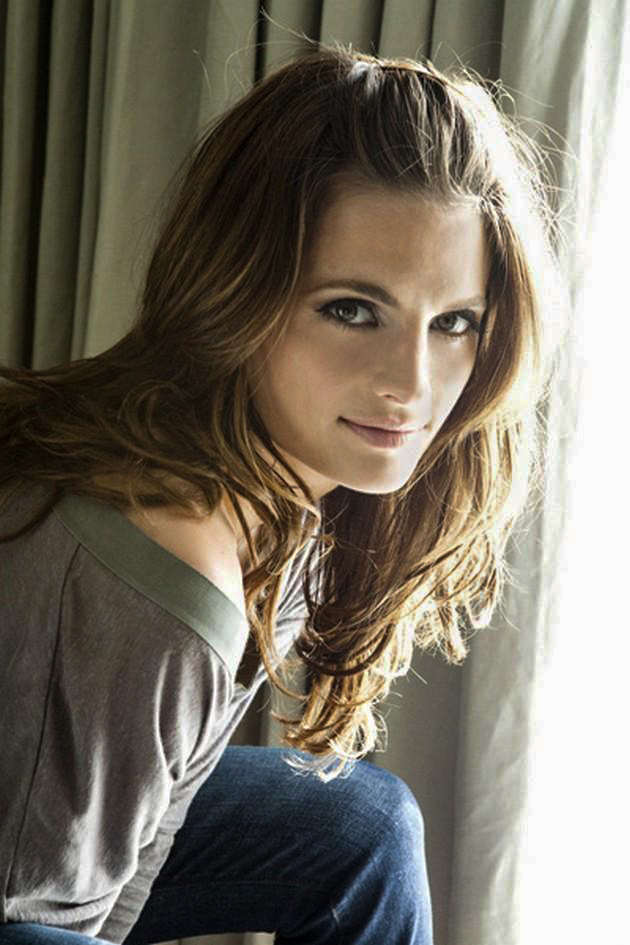
Stana Katic

The following is a list of characters in the ABC crime series Castle.

== Main characters ==
Character	Actor	Seasons							
Character	Actor	1	2	3	4	5	6	7	8
Richard Castle	Nathan Fillion	Main	Main	Main	Main	Main	Main	Main	Main
Det./Capt. Kate Beckett	Stana Katic	Main	Main	Main	Main	Main	Main	Main	Main
Martha Rodgers	Susan Sullivan	Main	Main	Main	Main	Main	Main	Main	Main
Capt. Roy Montgomery	Ruben Santiago-Hudson	Main	Main	Main			Guest		
Alexis Castle	Molly C. Quinn	Main	Main	Main	Main	Main	Main	Main	Main
Det. Javier Esposito	Jon Huertas	Main	Main	Main	Main	Main	Main	Main	Main
Dr. Lanie Parish	Tamala Jones	Main	Main	Main	Main	Main	Main	Main	Main
Det. Kevin Ryan	Seamus Dever	Main	Main	Main	Main	Main	Main	Main	Main
Capt. Victoria Gates	Penny Johnson Jerald				Main	Main	Main	Main	
Hayley Shipton	Toks Olagundoye								Main

=== Rick Castle ===
Richard "Rick" Castle (portrayed by Nathan Fillion) is a famous novelist who weathered through twenty rejections before he got his first manuscript published. He keeps his first rejection letter framed on his wall at home to keep himself motivated.

When the series begins, Castle has decided to kill off his most famous character, Derrick Storm, because the character has become boring to him. After weathering the backlash from his fans and nagging from his publisher, who is also his ex-wife, Castle is requested to help NYPD Detective Kate Beckett with a murder case that copycats scenarios from his previous novels (written before "Derrick Storm" series). Working alongside Beckett gives Castle a new source of inspiration, and after assisting Beckett with the case, Castle takes the opportunity to use his knowledge and skills, and his close friendship with the Mayor, to stay on with the NYPD in a consulting capacity. In the season seven finale "Hollander's Woods", an incident in Castle's past is revealed that had led to his ambition to become a writer.

=== Kate Beckett ===
Captain Katherine "Kate" Houghton Beckett (portrayed by Stana Katic) is a homicide detective with the NYPD. Having graduated from New York City's prestigious Stuyvesant High School and Stanford University, she is a first-class investigator who has gained a reputation as a detective who is intrigued by unusual cases, although she is also known for her ability to empathize with the victims of violent crimes. She joined the force after her mother was murdered and the case was (until the season 5 premiere) unsolved.

In season eight, Beckett is promoted to captain and made commanding officer of the 12th Precinct.

Initially finding Castle to be quite annoying, Beckett gradually warms to him as they work together to solve murder mysteries, utilizing his imagination and insight into a killer's mind and her authority and position within the police department. Even though Beckett does date (and subsequently break up with) several different men during her partnership with Castle, she eventually develops feelings for him, though she is reluctant to acknowledge them openly to anyone. Her reluctance to acknowledge her feelings for Castle, as well as her rejection of her previous boyfriends, stems from her determination to not get hurt, especially in the aftermath of her mother's death. Nevertheless, Beckett will drop subtle hints of her interest in Castle to him, sometimes in the form of suggestive comments that evoke suggestive imagery in Castle's mind. The two begin dating in season five, get engaged in season six, and are married in season seven.

=== Alexis Castle ===
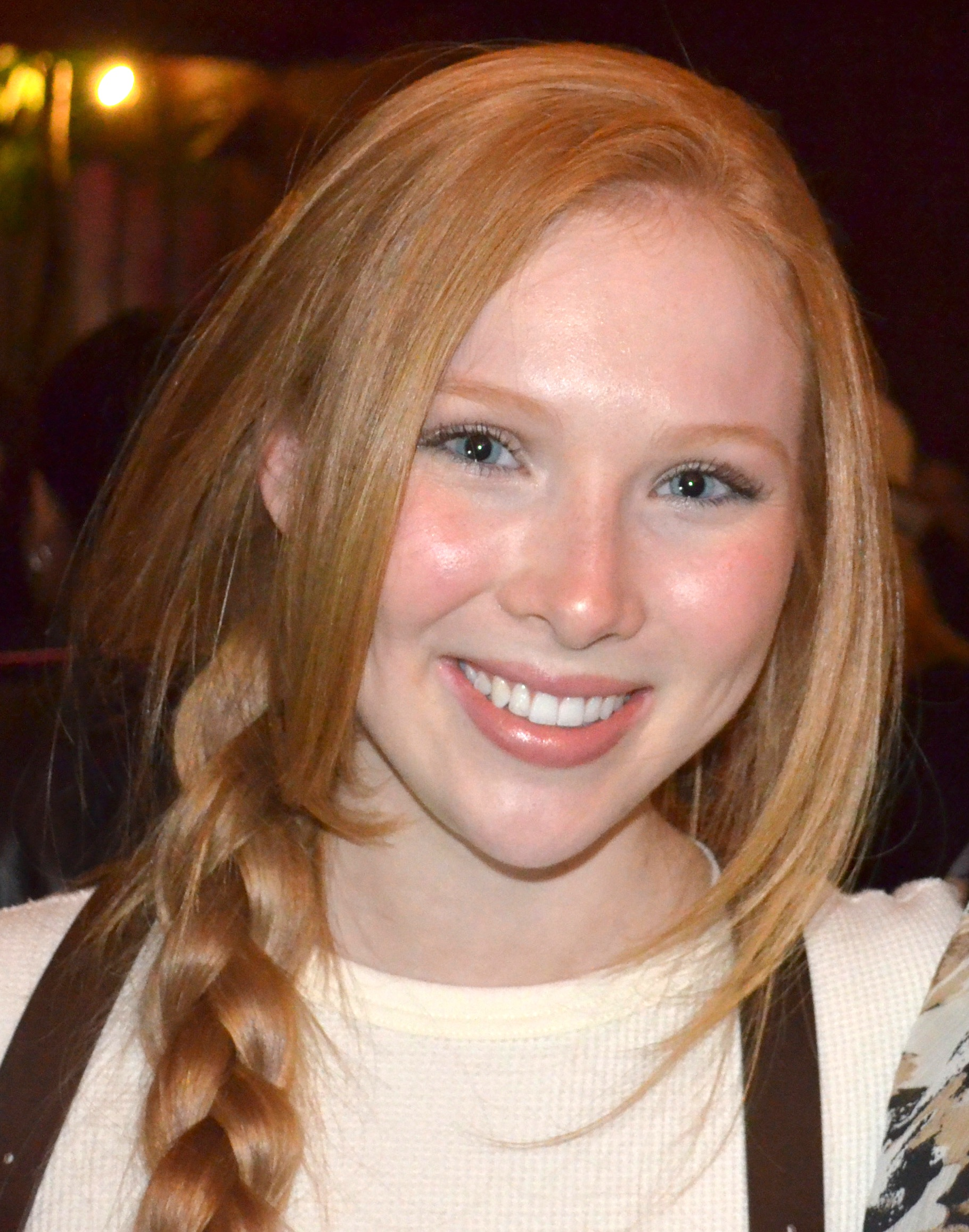
Molly C. Quinn

Alexis Harper Castle (portrayed by Molly C. Quinn) is Castle's daughter. Unusually mature and responsible for her age (notably a foil to Castle's immaturity), she is highly intelligent, academically motivated (she ends up attending Columbia University), and wise beyond her years. Alexis's social and interpersonal issues often parallel some aspect of the case Castle and Beckett are investigating. Castle will sometimes ask for her opinion on the motivation for some actions committed by the killers he hunts, such as who someone might ask for money.

Alexis is very close to her father, as they do many activities together, including fencing, book research projects such as learning lock-picking and safe-cracking—and laser tag. She has also developed a certain bond with Beckett, asking Beckett's advice when contemplating going on an exchange trip to France and making arrangements with the detective to spend three days working at the police station as part of a project for her civics class. In season four, however, Alexis's relationship with Beckett cools since she feels that the detective does not give her father the respect and involvement he deserves from her. Alexis begins dating a boy named Ashley in season three. They hope to attend Stanford University together, but while Ashley gains admittance, Alexis fails in her attempt to apply for early admittance, which distresses her greatly. Though they attempt to carry on a long-distance relationship, the strain of doing so is too much, and Alexis breaks up with Ashley in season four.

In season five, Alexis finally chooses to attend Columbia University so as to remain close to family and friends, and lives in their halls of residence while frequently dropping into her father's loft. She is kidnapped by an ex-KGB officer who previously crossed swords with her mysterious grandfather, but displays her father's resilience, deductive logic and skills during the encounter. In season six, she returns from Costa Rica with a boyfriend named Pi, and the two move in together some time later. After a few episodes, Alexis realizes that Pi is not the one for her and eventually breaks up with him. On Beckett's advice, she moves back in with her father a short time later.

In season eight, it is revealed that Alexis has been unofficially working at Richard Castle Investigations for a month; in that time, she has successfully solved a number of minor cases. When Castle learned that Alexis was not only working but actually solving cases, he officially hired her to work for him. Upon the successful resolution of a case, father and daughter shared a 50-year-old scotch and cigar-blowing-bubbles.

=== Martha Rodgers ===
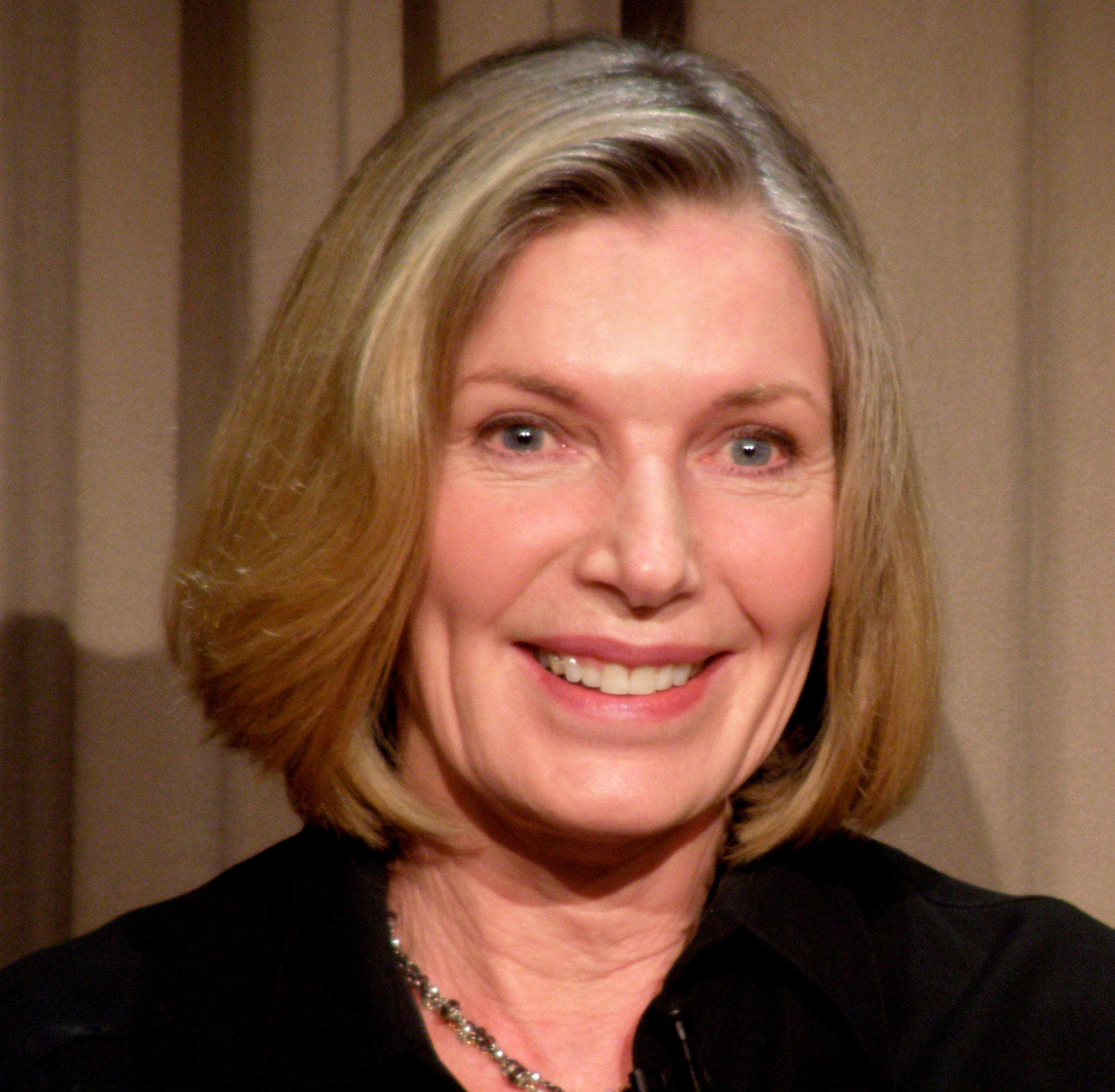
Susan Sullivan

Martha Rodgers (portrayed by Susan Sullivan) is Castle's mother and lives with him and her granddaughter Alexis. She is an actress on and off Broadway. She helps her son through the difficulties of raising a teenage girl (even one as mature as Alexis), but is also shown to have an active social life. She lives with Castle partly because a previous husband absconded with all her savings. Like Lanie and Esposito, she sees the dynamic between Castle and Beckett and especially from season three onward, gently urges her son to pursue the detective romantically. After inheriting a million dollars from her old boyfriend and brief fiancé Chet Palburn, Martha has opened the Martha Rodgers School of Acting to occupy her time. Martha often adopts highly theatrical gestures and body-movements in her day-to-day life.

=== Javier Esposito ===
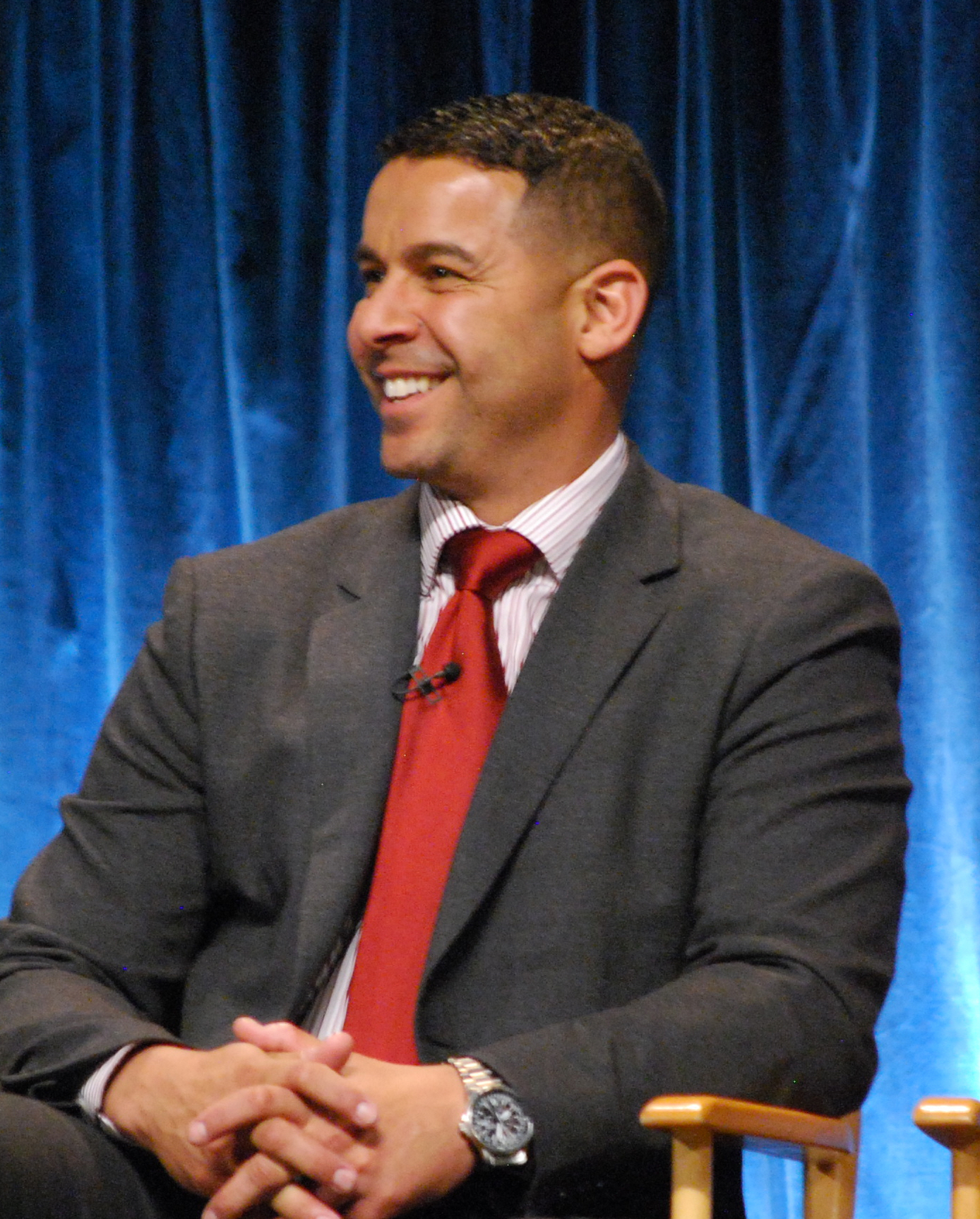
Jon Huertas

Javier Esposito (portrayed by Jon Huertas) is a bilingual (English and Spanish) detective who works in the homicide division with his partner, Kevin Ryan, as part of Beckett's team. He is always ready with a sardonic comment to keep Beckett on her toes and enjoys the way Castle riles her. He and Ryan are best friends, even though they constantly argue about obscure facts. He was disappointed when Ryan felt obliged to ask his fiancée's brother to be his best man instead of him. It is implied in the pilot "Flowers for Your Grave" he is a fan of Shark Week, and in the season two episode "Den of Thieves", it is revealed that Esposito transferred out of the 54th Precinct and has been partnered with Ryan for three years prior to the pilot episode. In season three's "Poof, You're Dead", he and medical examiner Lanie Parish began a relationship that they believed was a secret. However, their relationship was common knowledge to the other characters, who were playing along out of respect for their privacy, and in the episode "Lucky Stiff", Ryan tells Esposito that everyone knows about the relationship. In the season four episode "Demons", Esposito reveals that he and Lanie are "taking a break" after an awkward incident on a double date. In "Almost Famous", it is implied that he was in the Green Berets; this point of Esposito's personal history is developed in subsequent episodes "Knockdown" and the two-episode arc "Set-Up" and "Countdown". In the episode "Kill Shot" he displays technical knowledge of military sniping and refers to his having served in a sniper unit, implying that he received training.

In the season four finale, "Always", Esposito stands firmly behind Beckett as she decides to pursue the investigation of her mother's murder in secret because they fear that there would be other dirty cops in the precinct. This leads him to quarrel with Ryan who believes that they should come clean. After fighting with Maddox on the roof of a building, Beckett is saved by Ryan and Gates (whom Ryan had warned). Back at the precinct, Gates suspends Beckett and Esposito for their actions. Beckett then resigns, and Esposito refuses to talk to Ryan, just walking away as he tries to explain. Their friendship, however, is quickly renewed in season five.

In season eight, Esposito and Ryan both take the sergeant's exam; although Esposito passed (and Ryan didn't), he is number 279 out of 300, which means his promotion will not be coming anytime soon.

==== Awards and decorations ====
The following are the medals and service awards worn by Detective Esposito, as seen in "Knockout" and "Rise".

American Flag Breast Bar
NYPD Commendation—Integrity
NYPD Excellent Police Duty

=== Kevin Ryan ===
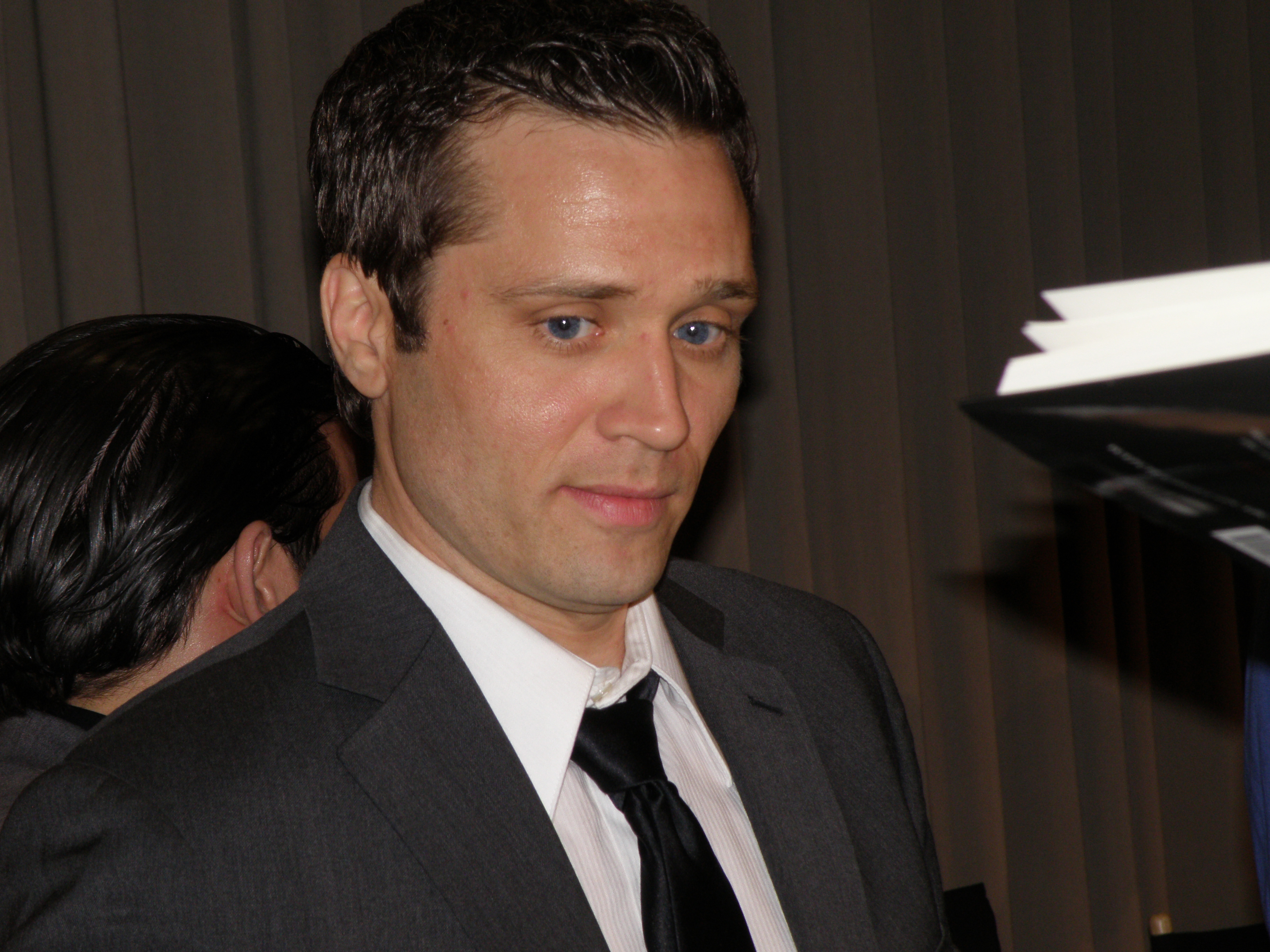
Seamus Dever

Detective Kevin Ryan (portrayed by Seamus Dever), formerly a narcotics division cop, now works alongside Esposito as part of Beckett's team. He and Esposito regularly tease Beckett, like when they discover that she had embarked on a brief modeling career during her teens, but they are otherwise incredibly protective of her and ultimately treat her like one of the guys. In the season one episode "Little Girl Lost", Ryan is revealed to have a new girlfriend named Jenny; she is often mentioned, and routinely calls him to check up on him, but her first appearance comes in "The Mistress Always Spanks Twice", where she was portrayed by Dever's real-life wife, Juliana. Jenny returned in the season three episode "Nikki Heat", where Ryan proposes to her in the middle of the homicide bullpen. In the fourth season, he is shown complaining about how stressful and complicated planning a wedding is. His love life and the fact he is in nearly-constant communication with his girlfriend/fiancée makes him subject to much teasing from his partner, so when Esposito begins dating Lanie, he relished turning the tables on his friend. Little is known about Ryan's family except that he grew up in the Bronx with an unknown number of sisters, only one of which has been named and seen in season seven, one of whom has a son, as Ryan makes reference to a nephew who loves the Captain Underpants book series. He also attended Catholic school for 12 years, as was mentioned during the episode "Knockdown".

In the season four finale, "Always", Ryan sides with Castle in stopping Beckett's investigation into her mother's murder in secret, feeling that not going through the proper channels will cost them. This puts him at odds with Esposito, who firmly stands behind Beckett's choice, causing friction within the group. After Castle quits, Beckett and Esposito try to catch the killer by themselves, which causes Ryan to make the painful choice to tell Gates about the secret investigation. Although he is able to save both of them in time, Beckett resigns from the force and Esposito is suspended. Ryan is ignored by Esposito when he tries to explain his reasons for telling Gates, frustrated that his choices cost him his friendship. Their friendship, however, is quickly renewed in season five, where it is revealed he was formerly undercover in the Irish mob under the name Fenton O'Connell, during which time he fell in love with a woman named Siobhan (Cara Buono), whom he left seven years ago. She never heard from or saw him again. When her life is threatened, he goes back undercover and brings down mobsters he knew once. He and Siobhan reconcile and she leaves for witness protection, then he learns his wife is pregnant. In the season six episode "Under Fire", Jenny gives birth to his daughter, Sarah Grace Ryan.

Ryan takes on extra jobs out of hours offering private security. In the season 7 episode "At Close Range", he takes a job with his brother-in-law, Frank Kelly, protecting a US congressman. When one of the congressman's aides is killed, Ryan is driven to solve the crime - even to the extent of arresting his brother-in-law, risking a family rift.

In season eight, when he learns that Jenny is once again pregnant and seeing both Beckett and Gates promoted, Ryan and Esposito both take the sergeant's exam. Unfortunately, Ryan does not pass, which leads to conflict and jealously with Esposito, who did pass. In "Death Wish", Jenny gives birth to their second child, Nicholas Javier Ryan.

==== Awards and decorations ====
The following are the medals and service awards worn by Detective Ryan, as seen in "Knockout" and "Rise".

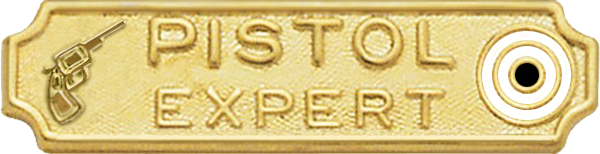
American Flag Breast Bar
NYPD Medal of Honor
NYPD Meritorious Police Duty
NYPD Firearms Proficiency Bar

=== Lanie Parish ===
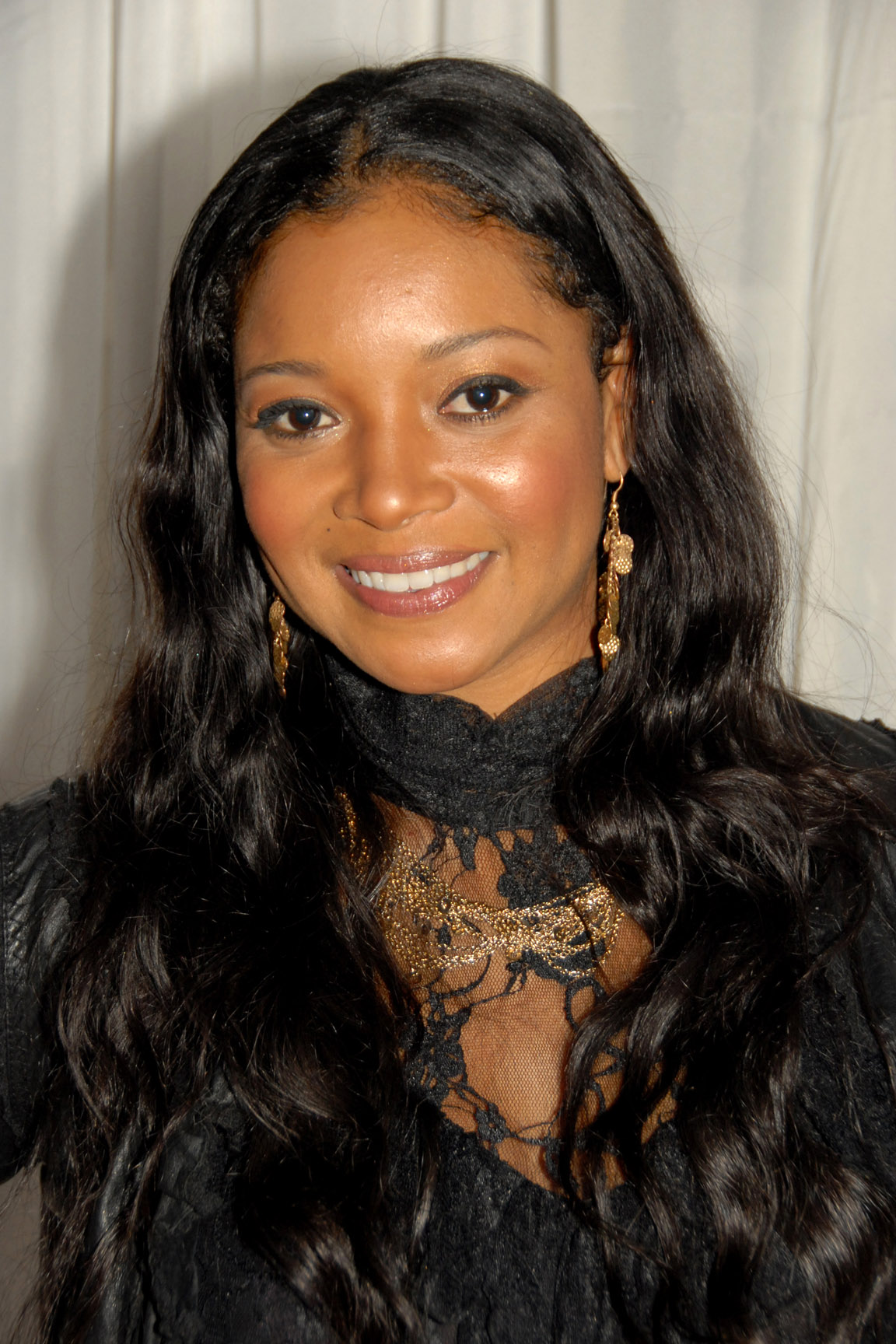
Tamala Jones

Dr. Lanie Parish (portrayed by Tamala Jones) is a medical examiner who has a friendly outlook. As a friend of Beckett's, she is one of the few people Beckett can talk to easily and without reservations. She is also one of the few people who notices the personal connection between Beckett and Castle and occasionally urges her to act on it. Unlike Beckett, she is far more comfortable with having a social life outside of her job; her personal life comes to the forefront when it becomes known that she and Esposito have begun a relationship they keep quiet from the rest of the team. They make attempts to maintain a low profile, unaware that the rest of the team already knows and approves of their relationship. They have recently taken a break in their relationship after an awkward incident during a double date with Ryan and Jenny, where Jenny, oblivious to the fact that the other couple was not in that stage of their relationship, asked when the two were going to get married like she and Ryan were about to in the very near future.

=== Roy Montgomery ===
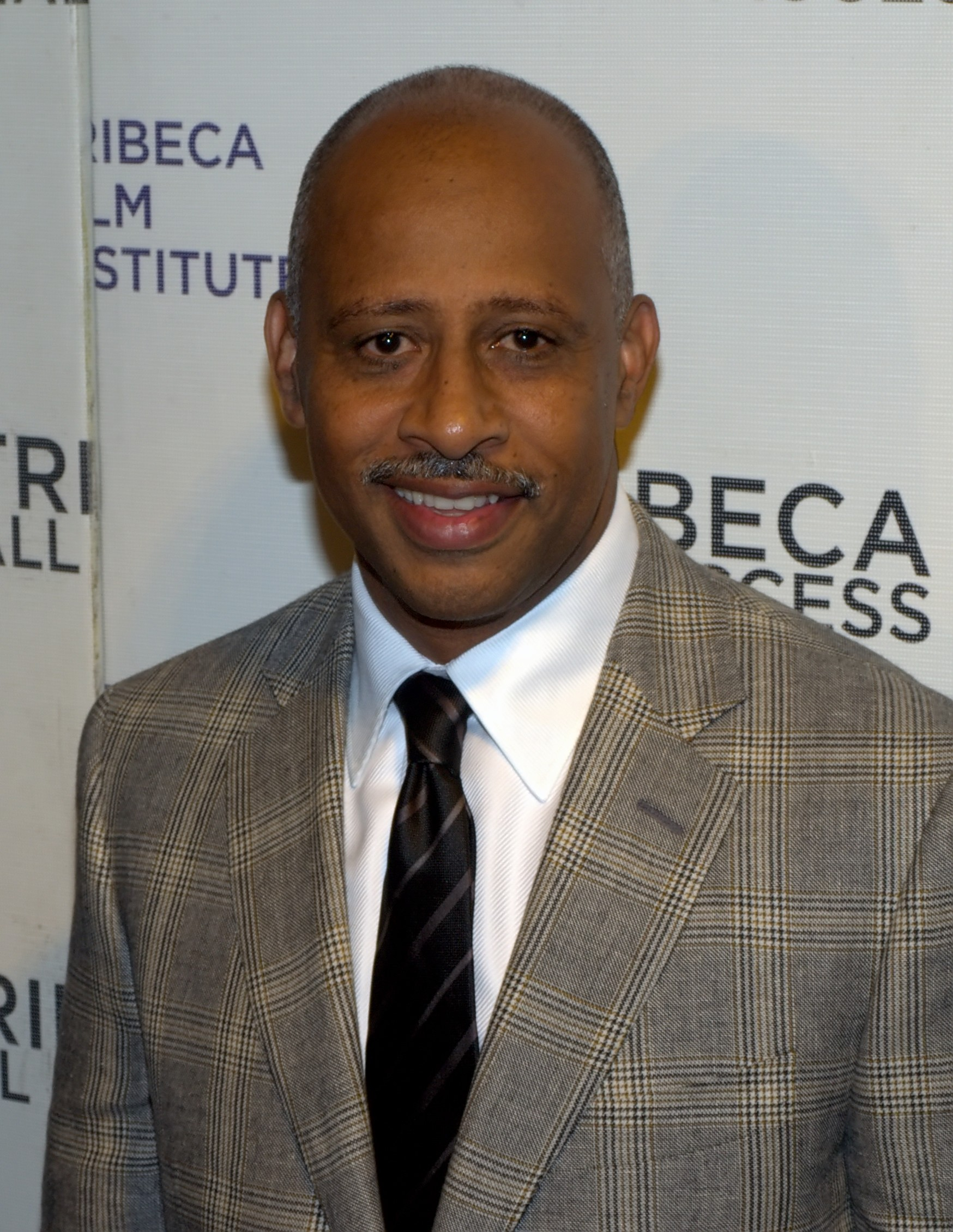
Ruben Santiago-Hudson

Captain Roy Montgomery (portrayed by Ruben Santiago-Hudson) (seasons 1–3) is a police captain who was Beckett's boss who appreciates Beckett's determination and diligence but maintains a close watch to make sure the investigation goes smoothly. He is amused by how much Castle annoys Beckett but also appreciates how effective the two are when they work together. He has also demonstrated a strong attachment and respect for Beckett, commenting to Castle that he has never known anyone who can comfort the victims of violent crimes better than Beckett and arguing with the governor to accept a deal that would have allowed a known drug trafficker to walk free when he offered information that would have allowed them to capture the man who murdered Beckett's mother (although the deal was revealed to be fake when it turned out that the drug trafficker was the killer). He has also commented that Castle is surprisingly good at police work, once speculating that Castle may have some police in his family history on his unknown father's side of the family.

In the season three finale, he is revealed as the third cop who was indirectly involved in the murder of Kate Beckett's mother. Montgomery sends files concerning that murder to a mystery man who later contacts Castle and tells him that those files are the leverage that Montgomery was using to keep himself, his family, and Beckett safe from the man who was behind everything. The mystery man then asks Castle to help him keep Beckett safe: The deal with the murderer was that the files would remain secret if Beckett stayed away from her mother's case. Lockwood tells Montgomery to hand Beckett over to him; initially, he asks Beckett to meet him, but he does this to inform Beckett of the situation and gets Castle to drag her away and leave Montgomery to face Lockwood and his men off by himself, despite Beckett's pleas that he does not need to put himself in this situation because she forgives him. Castle carries her away and following a brief conversation with Lockwood, Montgomery kills all four of Lockwood's hit squad, before being shot by Lockwood twice. However, Montgomery shoots Lockwood before succumbing to his injuries ending the confrontation in a mutual kill. Afterward, Beckett, Castle, Ryan, and Esposito agree to keep the truth about Montgomery's death a secret and he is buried as a hero.

Eventually, Montgomery's files are destroyed by Cole Maddox and Smith, and the man he sent them to is apparently killed, but Beckett is able to reconstruct enough of them to identify the man as Senator William Bracken. She pretends there is another copy of Montgomery's files to keep Bracken off her back. While this eventually fails, she discovers in "Veritas" that there was more evidence that Montgomery had that implicates Bracken: a recording of a conversation with Bracken in which he admits to blackmail and murder and his plans to kill Johanna Beckett if she does not back off. Montgomery had given it to Johanna Beckett before she was killed and in his first meeting with Kate Beckett, had tried to hint to her to look for cassette tapes for clues. Beckett did not catch on at the time but remembers the encounter in the present and locates the tape in elephant figurines of her mother's that she kept on her desk. With Montgomery's tape, she is finally able to arrest Bracken for the murder of her mother as he gives a live interview in which he announces his intention to run for president.

=== Victoria Gates ===
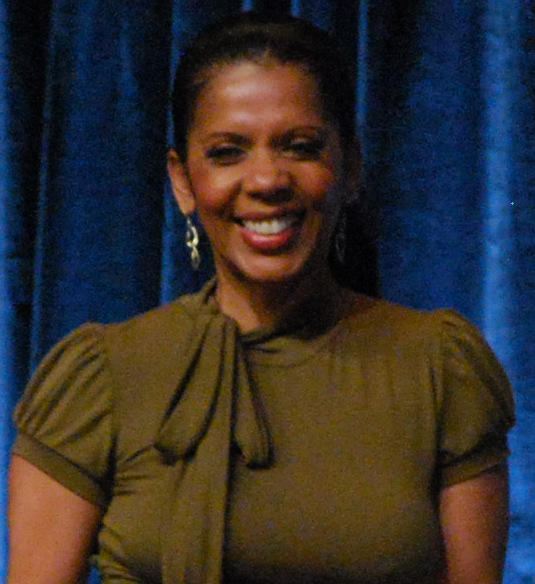
Penny Johnson Jerald

Captain Victoria Gates (portrayed by Penny Johnson Jerald) (seasons 4–7) is Montgomery's replacement as police captain of the 12th Precinct. At her own insistence, she is called "Sir" rather than "ma'am" by the officers who report to her (and Castle). Formerly with Internal Affairs, Gates, known to some as "Iron Gates", is more interested in career advancement and the reputation of the precinct, and by extension, the NYPD, than in the finer points of interpersonal dynamics, making decisions based on the political impact that they would have. This contrasts with the style of her predecessor, who made decisions based on how they would affect people (for example, concealing a policewoman's vigilante activities because of the potential political backlash) and takes a dimmer view than her predecessor of the Beckett-Castle working relationship. Although she is obliged by the mayor to allow Castle to stay on in his consulting role, Gates tries to convince Beckett that she can be a better detective without him around. In the episode "Still", Gates reveals that she was aware that Castle and Beckett were in a relationship but tells them that she did not say anything in order to maintain her own plausible deniability, and she promises to continue her silence on the condition that the two be professional on the job. In "Dial M for Mayor", she encourages Beckett to perform her duties objectively and dispassionately, stating her attitude in IA and Homicide was not because she hated police officers but because she works hard to hold people accountable so NYPD officers like her father, uncle, and subordinates can bear the cost of serving the people of New York free of corruption. She has a sister, named Elizabeth Weston, who's a US Attorney. The two have a tense relationship as years before, Gates had to bust a corrupt cop involved in one of Elizabeth's investigations despite Elizabeth's protests. They reunite over another case and put aside some of that bad feeling.

On May 29, 2015, Penny Johnson Jerald revealed through her Twitter account that she is no longer a cast member of Castle. She stated that she was surprised and saddened by this occurrence. Her character was written out by promoting Gates to Deputy Chief and reassigning her to One Police Plaza.

== Recurring characters ==
Character	Actor	Seasons							
Character	Actor	1	2	3	4	5	6	7	8
L.T	L.T Tolliver	Recurring	Recurring	Recurring	Recurring	Recurring	Recurring	Recurring	Recurring
Jim Beckett	Scott Paulin	Guest	Guest	Recurring	Guest	Recurring		Guest	
Meredith	Darby Stanchfield	Guest				Guest			
Gina Cowell	Monet Mazur	Guest	Guest	Guest					
Stephen J. Cannell	Stephen J. Cannell	Guest	Recurring						
James Patterson	James Patterson	Guest	Guest						
Will Sorenson	Bailey Chase	Recurring							
M.E. Sidney Perlmutter	Arye Gross		Recurring	Guest	Guest	Recurring	Recurring	Recurring	Recurring
Jenny Ryan	Juliana Dever		Guest	Guest	Recurring	Guest	Guest	Guest	Guest
Dr. Holloway	Phil LaMarr		Recurring				Guest		
Michael Connelly	Michael Connelly		Recurring	Guest				Guest	
Det. Tom Demming	Michael Trucco		Recurring						
Marcus Gates	Lee Tergesen			Guest				Guest	
Jerry Tyson	Michael Mosley			Guest		Guest		Recurring	
Vulcan Simmons	Jonathan Adams			Guest			Recurring		
Josh Davidson	Victor Webster			Recurring	Guest				
Ashley	Ken Baumann			Recurring					
Dennis Lehane	Dennis Lehane			Guest					
Michael Smith	Geoff Pierson				Recurring	Guest	Guest		Guest
Ethan Slaughter	Adam Baldwin				Guest				Guest
Dr. Carter Burke	Michael Dorn				Recurring	Guest		Guest	
Sophia Turner	Jennifer Beals				Recurring				
Sen. William Bracken	Jack Coleman					Recurring	Recurring		Recurring
Tory Ellis	Maya Stojan					Recurring	Recurring	Recurring	
Jackson Hunt	James Brolin					Guest	Guest		
Dr. Kelly Nieman	Annie Wersching						Guest	Recurring	
Vikram Singh	Sunkrish Bala								Recurring
Rita Hunt	Ann Cusack								Recurring
Caleb Brown	Kristoffer Polaha								Recurring
Mason Wood	Gerald McRaney								Recurring

=== Sidney Perlmutter ===
Dr. Sidney Perlmutter (portrayed by Arye Gross) is a medical examiner, rotating the role with Lanie (although Lanie is more regularly featured). He is shown to have more than a few quirks, such as eating lunch off of his autopsy tables—reasoning that the disinfectants used in the morgue mean that it is actually "the cleanest room in the city"—and always has a sarcastic remark. He sometimes teases or insults Castle at crime scenes when Castle tries to do his job.

=== Jenny Ryan ===
Jenny Ryan (portrayed by Juliana Dever) is Ryan's girlfriend and later wife. She is first mentioned in season one, but does not appear until the season two episode "The Mistress Always Spanks Twice". Ryan proposes in the season three episode "Nikki Heat" and they marry in the season four episode, "Till Death Do Us Part". She gives birth to their daughter, Sarah Grace Ryan, in the season six episode "Under Fire". She later gives birth to a son, Nicholas Javier Ryan, in the season eight episode "Death Wish".

Juliana Dever, the actress who plays Jenny, is married to Seamus Dever, who plays Kevin Ryan.

=== Tory Ellis ===
Tory Ellis (portrayed by Maya Stojan) is an officer in the NYPD's Crime Scene Unit who specializes in technical analysis. She often helps Beckett's team by accessing and assessing the data on computers belonging to suspects and victims.

=== Detective Tom Demming ===
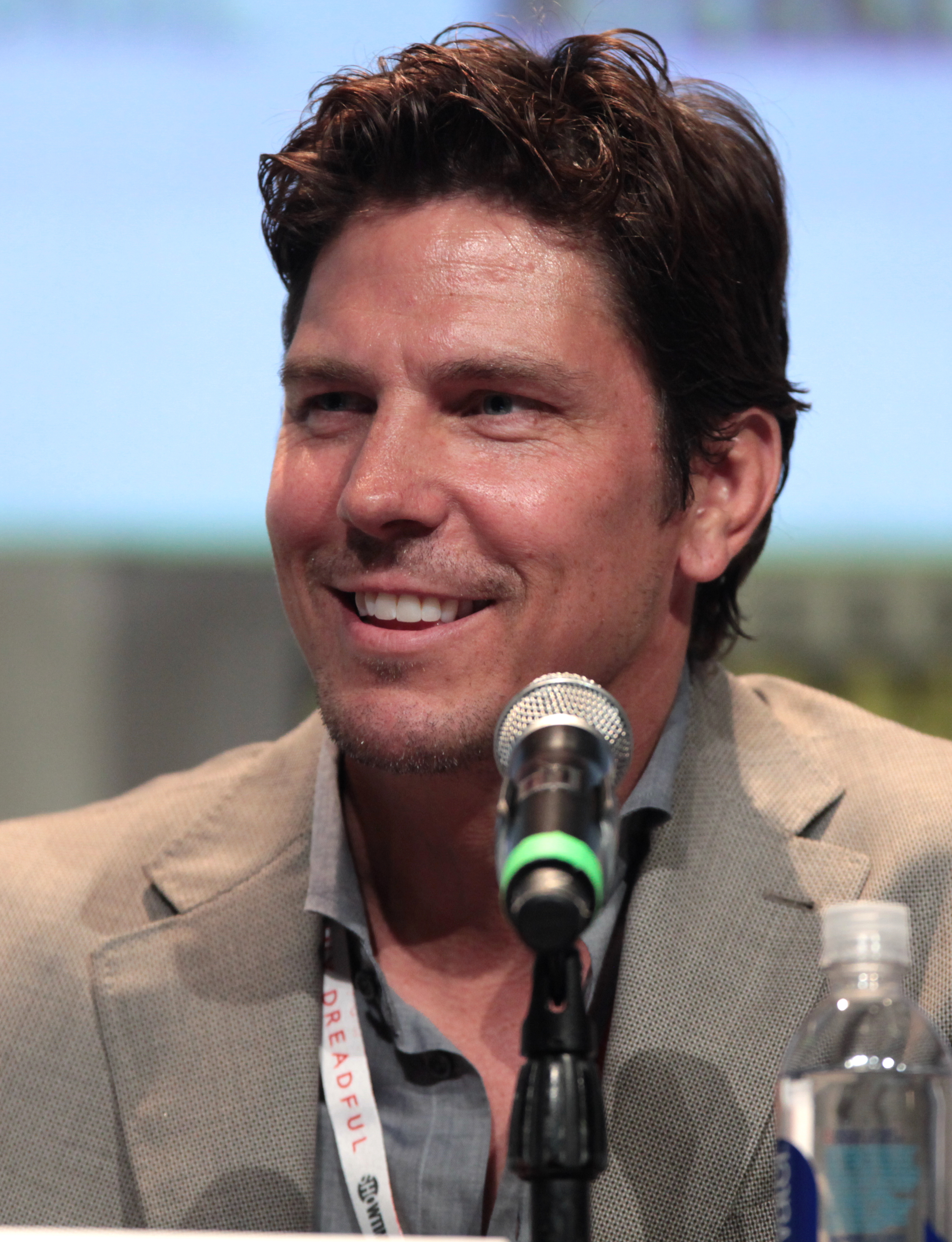
Michael Trucco

Detective Tom Demming (portrayed by Michael Trucco) is a handsome robbery detective with whom Beckett briefly becomes involved. Castle and Demming often had a rivalry and tried to outdo each other for Beckett's attention. Despite being a "good-on-paper" boyfriend, Beckett ultimately breaks up with him because of her unresolved feelings toward Castle in the season two finale.

=== Gina Cowell ===
Gina Cowell (portrayed by Monet Mazur) is Castle's publisher and second ex-wife. Castle and Gina got back together at the end of season two, However, due to their fighting all the time, Castle breaks up with her in episode twelve ("Poof You're Dead") of season three, having concluded that the relationship had lost its magic.

=== Josh Davidson ===
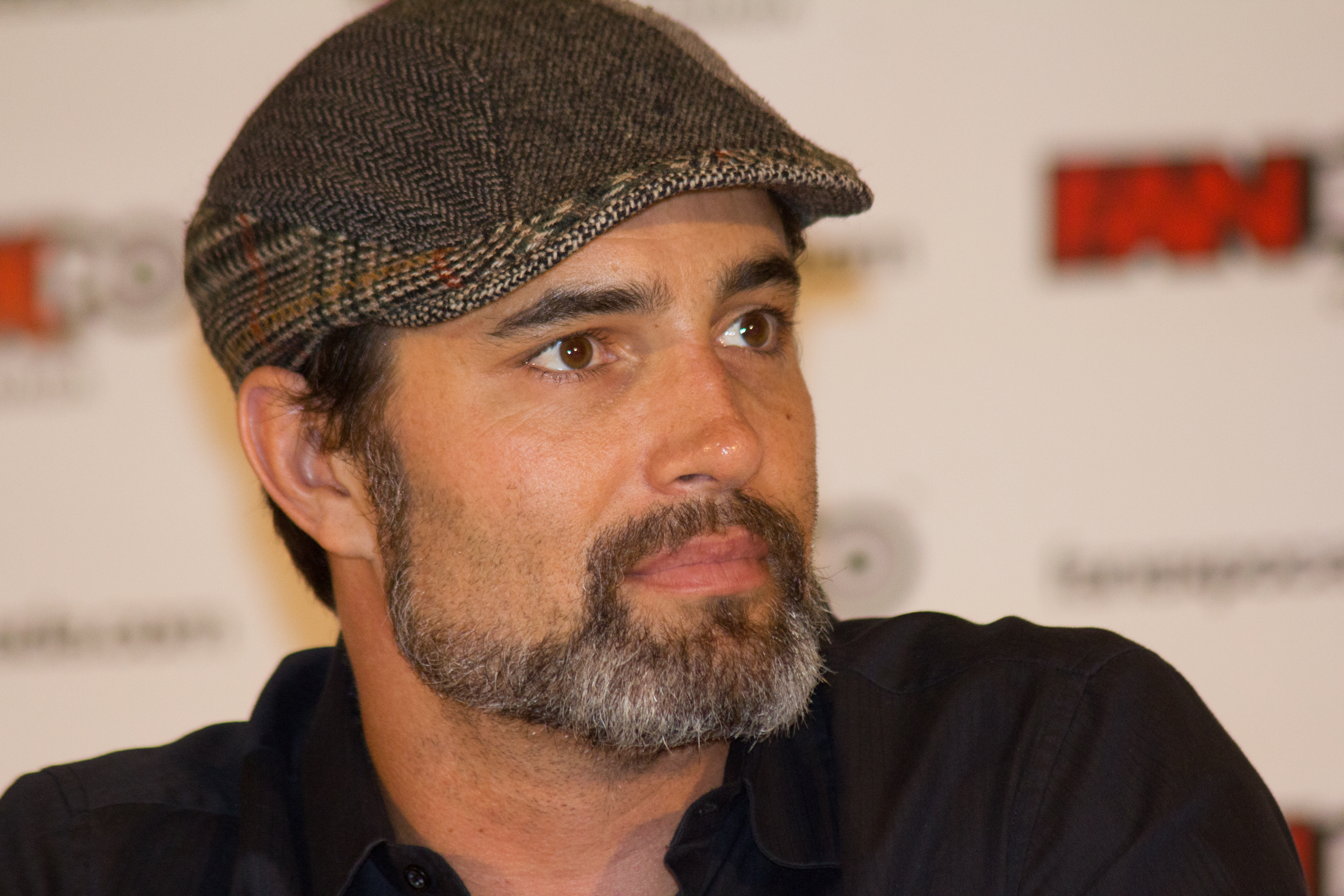
Victor Webster

Josh Davidson (portrayed by Victor Webster) is Beckett's boyfriend in season three. He is a cardiac surgeon who often spends time in under-privileged countries. Castle refers to him as Doctor Motorcycle Boy. In the two-parter of season three, Beckett tells Castle that she does not like the huge distance between Josh and her. They rarely see each other due to their jobs. In the fourth-season premiere, a critically injured Beckett is brought to Josh's operating room after being shot in the heart. He begins emergency surgery and operates on her until another doctor can take over for him and violently confronts Castle in the hospital waiting room, blaming him for Beckett's injuries. Later on in the episode, after a three-month time jump, Beckett tells Castle that she has broken up with Josh, admitting that while she "really liked him", she could not give herself to another while focusing on her mother's case.

=== Mr. Smith ===
Michael Smith, better known as Mr. Smith (portrayed by Geoff Pierson), is a mysterious old friend of Roy Montgomery who first appeared in the season three finale "Knock Out". He is believed to have saved Montgomery's life, which convinces Montgomery that Smith is trustworthy. When Montgomery is killed by men working for the man responsible for Beckett's mother's murder, he sends incriminating files to Smith. These files had the potential to be very damaging to Montgomery's killers, and Smith used the files as leverage against them. In exchange for Beckett's life, Smith keeps the files out of the public arena on the condition that Beckett stops her investigation into her mother's murder. Smith makes his next appearance in the season four premiere, "Rise", contacting Richard Castle and asking him to convince Beckett to stand down, though Castle himself continues the investigation. It is unknown if Smith is his real name.

Smith appears again in "Dial M for Mayor". When Castle and Beckett investigate a murder connected to the Mayor of New York City, Smith points Castle in the direction of evidence that leads them to an aide in the mayor's office. After they arrest the aide, Smith sends him legal counsel, effectively stopping the investigation. Castle is enraged, but Smith points out that if the case went any further, the mayor would either be removed from office or voluntarily leave to pursue a campaign for state governor. With the mayor out of office, Victoria Gates's first act would be to have Castle removed from the 12th Precinct, and without Castle, Beckett would have no protection against her mother's killers.

In the season four finale, "Always", a break-in at Captain Montgomery's house reopens the case and leads to Smith contacting Castle to try to get Beckett to back down again. However, this time, Castle fails and walks away. At the end of the episode, Cole Maddox—an assassin sent by the killers—shows up at Smith's house. Maddox wanted to recover the files that Montgomery had sent Smith as his employer no longer wanted to live blackmailed. Maddox wants the information, promising that he would kill Beckett as soon as he gets it. Smith is later found dead in the fifth-season premiere "After the Storm", having been tortured by Maddox. However, he had laid a booby trap on the files that kills Maddox, though Beckett is able to reconstruct them enough to learn the identity of Bracken. His exact relationship to Montgomery remains unknown, and there has been no explanation of how he came to be in a position to stop the conspiracy from harming Beckett.

In the season six semi-finale "Veritas", it is revealed that Smith had faked his death and had gone into hiding to find a new way to implicate Senator William Bracken, the man behind the whole conspiracy. At first he found a consultant working for Bracken who could prove that Bracken's campaign funding in his bid for president was corrupt, but his contact was killed off before that could happen. Smith later attempted to turn one of Bracken's employees, Jason Marks, but Vulcan Simmons killed him before that could happen. Soon after Beckett connects the dots between Simmons and Bracken, Simmons is killed off to frame her. Smith later meets clandestinely with Castle and Beckett, who are on the run, revealing that Bracken is searching for a tape containing audio evidence proving he ordered the murders, including that of Beckett's mother, but he has no idea where it could be. Smith then departed their company, warning them not to contact him again. After remembering her first encounter with Montgomery, Beckett realizes he'd given the tape to her mother and finds it in her mother's old elephant figurines on her desk. With this new evidence, Beckett is finally able to arrest Bracken as he announces on live TV his intention to run for president.

=== Jerry Tyson ===
Jerry Tyson (portrayed by Michael Mosley), also known as the Triple Killer and 3XK, is a serial killer. As the Triple Killer, he periodically returned to New York to terrorize the city, strangling three women in a week, dumping their bodies in alleys, and then leaving the city without a trace after three weeks. At some indeterminate point, he would return to the city and repeat the process. Roy Montgomery was part of the original task force assigned to catch him, and Richard Castle researched the Triple Killer's original crime spree when he was writing one of his novels, When It Comes to Slaughter.

No law enforcement agency has ever come close to catching Tyson, and it was widely believed that he was dead as he has been away from New York for an extended period of time. It is only through Castle's efforts that the police are able to put a name to the Triple Killer when Castle realizes that Tyson's absence from the city and his killing pattern was because he was in prison. Nevertheless, Tyson successfully escapes even after he is confronted, overpowering Kevin Ryan and stealing his service weapon. He is later directly responsible for the events of "Kick the Ballistics" when he hands Ryan's weapon to an enemy under the guise of friendship, knowing that the man will use the gun in a future crime and attract the attention of Beckett and her team.

Tyson makes his second appearance in the season five episode "Probable Cause", where he frames Castle for the murder of a young woman and plans to have his contacts in prison kill Castle as soon as he arrives after his arraignment. He also plants suggestive emails on Castle's computer with the intention of having Beckett believe Castle has been unfaithful to her. When Castle breaks out of custody and proves Tyson's involvement in the young woman's murder, Tyson confronts both him and Beckett on a bridge. Castle shoots Tyson, who falls into the water below. Police divers are unable to recover his body and he is formally listed as missing and presumed to be dead. Castle, however, believes that Tyson orchestrated the encounter to stage his own death in front of Beckett, whose account of events will be used to lend credibility to the belief that Tyson is dead.

In the season six episode, "Disciple", Castle suspected Tyson to be behind murdered doppelgangers of Lanie and Esposito and is proven right when it is discovered that the doppelgangers were used to steal all the 3XK files from police records. Though they arrested the real killer who wanted to emulate Tyson, Ryan discovered that the plastic surgeon, Kelly Nieman, responsible for the look-a-likes' appearances was a prison doctor at the same time Tyson was admitted and resigned the day he escaped, and thus, she is suspected of being Tyson's girlfriend. Beckett's team raids the surgeon's office, only to find it cleaned out, with only a note reading "Better luck next time". At the end of the episode, it is implied that if Tyson is still alive, he has gathered followers to assist him in his crimes; if he is dead, his admirers within the serial killing community have started paying tribute to his crimes. Both possibilities leave the 12th Precinct equally disturbed.

In season seven, Tyson and Nieman return after one of the latter's patients is found dead. Tyson masqueraded as Michael Boudreaux, falsely claiming that Nieman gave him surgery to look like Tyson. With the 3XK files gone, Castle and Beckett try to prove that "Boudreaux" was Tyson by tracking down his mother and finding a tooth among his possessions for DNA testing. However, the results were inconclusive and the 12th Precinct was forced to let him go. While Tyson and Nieman are at the precinct, their accomplice, Amy Barrett, another one of Nieman's patients, lures Beckett away from the precinct and captures her. Tyson left a series of false trails for the police to follow, eventually leading to Castle assaulting Tyson in Boudreaux's apartment, but was stopped by the police before he could do any harm. After pressing charges against Castle, Tyson and Nieman drop off the grid. Castle went to Tyson's cellmate, Marcus Gates, for the location of Tyson's safehouse. Upon arriving, Tyson captures Castle and holds him captive so he can watch Nieman take Beckett's face for her own. However, it is a trap set by Castle to draw him out into the open and Esposito is waiting outside with a sniper rifle. On Castle's order, Esposito shoots Tyson in the abdomen, killing him. They are able to use his phone to find Beckett, who has killed Nieman and escaped.

As the Triple Killer, Tyson is characterized as a master of disguise, and able to easily manipulate and coerce people to do his bidding and even confess to his crimes. He is shown to be meticulous in his attention to detail, both in the planning and execution of his crimes, and has been shown to carry out complex crimes without leaving any evidence behind. He confides to Castle that he enjoys stalking his victims and planning their deaths more than actually killing them, and it is implied that when he leaves New York, he adopts the persona of another serial killer and carries out a new series of crimes under a different identity. Tyson considers himself to be an artist, and is easily angered by people who interfere with his plans. As the series progresses, Tyson refines his methods by studying the police response and adapting accordingly. By the time of his third appearance, his crimes have evolved to the point where they no longer resemble his original murders.

=== William Bracken ===
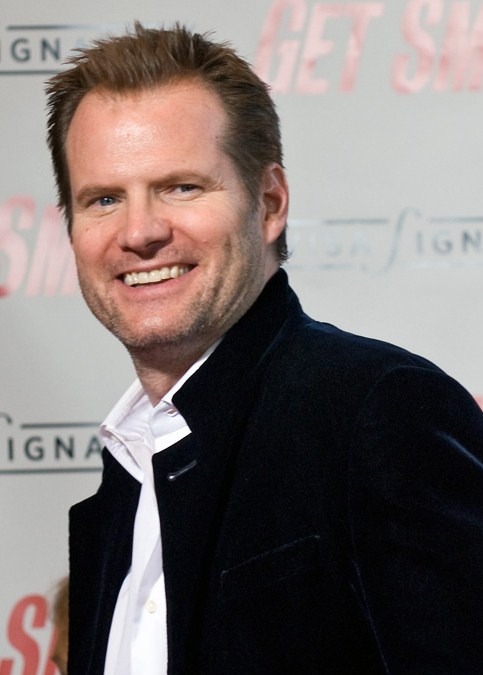
Jack Coleman

Senator William Bracken (portrayed by Jack Coleman) also The Dragon or Lazarus is a United States senator with aspirations of becoming President. Despite being an unseen character until the season five premiere, "After the Storm", Bracken is directly responsible for one of the major events tied to the series's lore: the murder of Johanna Beckett.

Twenty years prior to the series, Bracken was working as an Assistant District Attorney in Manhattan when he learned of a small group of corrupt police officers—John Raglan, Gary McAllister and Roy Montgomery—who were kidnapping mobsters for ransom. Knowing their identities and aware that any attempt to prosecute the officers would be futile as he had no evidence, Bracken blackmailed the officers and used the ransom money to fund his political career. The scam worked until an undercover FBI agent was accidentally killed during the attempted abduction of mobster Joe Pulgatti. Pulgatti was able to escape, but was arrested for the murder, forcing Bracken to shut down the scam. When Johanna Beckett, a civil rights lawyer, became interested in the case on Pulgatti's behalf, Bracken hired the assassin Dick Coonan—better known by his alter ego, Rathborne—to kill her and arranged for Raglan and McAllister to be assigned to investigate her murder, which they wrote off as a random attack and subsequently turned into a cold case, covering up the conspiracy. This allowed Bracken to distance himself from the crime and continue with his political ambitions. When confronted in "Sucker Punch", Coonan confirms that he was hired to kill Johanna Beckett but is shot and killed before revealing the identity of his employer.

Bracken's influence is again felt in "Knockdown", when John Raglan approaches Kate Beckett looking to clear his conscience when faced with his own imminent death from cancer. Bracken gets wind of this, and hires another assassin, Hal Lockwood, to kill him. Castle and Beckett make the connection between Raglan and McAllister and arrest McAllister before he can be killed. Lockwood is then caught, which prompts Bracken to use his influence to have Lockwood moved into the General Population area of the prison so that he can kill McAllister in "Knockout". Meanwhile, Roy Montgomery has approached Bracken independently with a deal: Bracken will leave Beckett alone if Montgomery stops her from investigating her mother's death. When he is unable to keep Beckett from investigating the case, Montgomery forwards all of his incriminating evidence against Bracken to Mr. Smith with instructions to continue forcing Bracken to back off. Montgomery then kills Lockwood, sacrificing himself in order to do so. At the end of "Knockout", Beckett is shot by a third assassin, Cole Maddox, who was again hired by Bracken. However, Bracken was unable to kill her because Smith forced him to back down.

It is also strongly implied that Bracken is responsible for the events of "Dial M for Mayor", orchestrating a conspiracy against New York City mayor Robert Wheldon to discredit Wheldon and stifle his ambitions of becoming Governor of New York and eventually president.

With Bracken turning his attention to the presidency, he has Maddox try to retrieve Montgomery's evidence before going after Beckett. After Maddox is killed trying to retrieve the files, Castle and Beckett are finally able to identify Bracken through the remains of Montgomery's payments to Bracken's bank account, the evidence Smith held for Montgomery. Now knowing the name of the man who had her mother killed, Beckett approaches Bracken at a political fundraiser and convinces him to leave her alone, or else his secrets will become public. Bracken appears again in "Recoil", when the 12th Precinct is able to connect a murder victim directly to him, only to discover that Bracken has become the target of a political assassin as he prepares his presidential campaign. Beckett is forced to help save his life by thwarting the assassin, and Bracken acknowledges that he owes her his life before approaching the press and using the circumstances behind the episode to present himself as a politician willing to stand up against corrupt senators since the assassin was hired by his former mentors and consolidating public perception of him as a presidential candidate.

Bracken plays a pivotal role in the season six episode "In the Belly of the Beast", when Beckett is recruited to a risky undercover operation to infiltrate a drug ring and investigate a connection between the ring and the Russian mafia in a bid to identify the kingpin, known only as Lazarus. Beckett discovers that the proceeds from the drug ring are being laundered through the Future Fund, a political fundraiser collecting money to support Bracken's presidential bid. She also learns that Bracken had ordered one of his contract killers to save her after Vulcan Simmons—the figurehead for the ring and one of the original suspects in the murder of Johanna Beckett—blows her cover, as a means of repaying his debt to her. Beckett predicts that the next time they meet, all bets are off.

In the season six episode "Veritas", when Bracken learns that Beckett has been carrying out discreet surveillance of Vulcan Simmons, he realizes that she was bluffing when she claimed to have physical evidence during the events of "After the Storm" and arranges for Simmons's murder, planning to implicate Beckett in the crime in order to discredit her. Beckett is forced to go into hiding but locates an unexpected piece of evidence: a recording made by Roy Montgomery given to her mother in which Bracken details his plan to kill Johanna Beckett and admits to blackmail and having other people killed. It turns out that Beckett had the evidence she needed all along to arrest Bracken because Johanna had hidden it in her elephant figurines, which Beckett keeps on her desk. With her innocence proven, Beckett confronts and arrests Bracken during a televised speech in which he announces his ambition to become president, charging him with conspiracy, fraud, and the murder of her mother. On live television, Bracken is led to a police car and taken into custody, to Beckett's relief.

Bracken makes his final appearance in the season eight two-part premiere, "XY" and "XX". According to Castle's stepmother, Rita, Bracken had a mysterious partner in the CIA who covertly assisted Vulcan Simmons in his drug trade. When an analyst in the attorney general's office discovers a redacted document called "Loksat" mentioning Bracken and passes it to Beckett's former A.G. team, the partner has the team killed, setting off an explosive chain of events that leads to Beckett and Castle visiting Bracken in prison separately. Bracken refuses to speak of "Loksat" to Beckett and after Castle's visit, attacks a guard to get sent to solitary, only to be murdered in his own cell as Ryan and Esposito come to question him. Despite Bracken's death effectively avenging Johanna's murder, Beckett becomes obsessed with hunting down Loksat, who ultimately proves to be a man named Mason Wood.

=== Jackson Hunt ===
Castle's father (portrayed by James Brolin) is a spy working on behalf of the United States government, though his exact affiliation is unclear. Having met Martha Rodgers after finishing an assignment at the United Nations, he was forced to leave her without warning the next morning when things went south. It was over a year before he discovered Martha had borne him a son, and despite having a career that prevented his ability to have personal relationships, he made the effort to be involved in his son's life; he gave Castle a copy of Casino Royale at the age of ten, which inspired him to become a writer. As he tells Richard when they meet for the first time as father and son, he has been checking in on Richard, Martha, and Alexis their whole lives.

The identity of Castle's father is never directly addressed during the first four seasons, with Castle choosing not to seek him out as he enjoys the mystery of his identity, though it is also implied that Castle's refusal to address the issue has led to the breakdown of at least one relationship. The first clue to his character comes during the "Linchpin" and "Pandora" story arc, when Castle and Beckett are enlisted to help the CIA in an investigation; the agency suggests they are aware of Castle's father.

He made his first appearance during the "Target" and "Hunt" two-part storyline when Alexis is abducted by a former KGB operative as part of a plot to lure him into the open and kill him. Under the alias Jackson Hunt, he enlists Castle's help to save Alexis before disappearing, but leaves a copy of Casino Royale as a calling card to inform Castle that he is alive. He makes his second appearance in the season six episode "Deep Cover", using the name Anderson Cross as part of a non-official cover on a delicate assignment to locate an Iranian intelligence officer code-named Gemini before Gemini can expose the CIA's deep-cover agents operating abroad. Hunt becomes the prime suspect in the murder of a hacker he enlisted to assist him, manipulating the crime scene to draw Beckett's attention so that he can lead her to Gemini. Although Castle walks away from the experience thinking his father was only using him and does not really care for him, his dad was later seen watching him and Martha.

His real identity is unknown, but he has a second wife, Rita Hunt, who appears in the eighth season during Beckett's hunt for the mysterious "Loksat".
