= Outside the Law (2002 film) =

- Film poster
- Directed by: Jorge Montesi
- Written by: Rob Gilmer
- Produced by: Les Alexander
- Starring: Cynthia Rothrock; Seamus Dever; Jessica Stier; Jeff Wincott; Stephen Macht
- Cinematography: Peter Benison
- Edited by: Lisa Robison
- Music by: Andrea Saparoff
- Production companies: Alexander/Enright & Associates
- Distributed by: Columbia TriStar
- Release dates: June 13, 2002 (Russia); June 25, 2002 (USA)
- Running time: 90 min.
- Country: United States
- Language: English

Outside the Law is a 2002 American direct-to-video action film, starring Cynthia Rothrock, Seamus Dever, Jessica Stier, Jeff Wincott and Stephen Macht. It was directed by Jorge Montesi.

== Plot ==
A secret agent is about to face her most dangerous mission yet.

== Cast ==
- Cynthia Rothrock as Julie Cosgrove
- Seamus Dever as Rick Michell
- Jessica Stier as Rita
- Jeff Wincott as Michael Peyton
- Stephen Macht as Dick Dawson
- Brad Greenquist as Agent McKenzie

== Reception ==
The Move Scene gave the movie a bad review stating that: "What this all boils down to is that "Outside the Law" is not a great Cynthia Rothrock movie and unfortunately the editing and camera work robs the audience of what they watch the movie for which is Rothrock kicking butt. But for action fans it is just about watchable even if it is all incredibly familiar". Robert Pardi from TV Guide the film two of four possible stars, concluding: "A well-constructed star vehicle, this vigorous action flick exploits Rothrock's athletic prowess without taxing her acting skill. Her unique niche as a female action icon remains secure in this fast-paced, escapist trifle".

Outside the Law currently holds an 86% score on Rotten Tomatoes and is regarded as "Fresh".
