= The Mangler Reborn =

- DVD cover
- Directed by: Erik Gardner; Matt Cunningham
- Written by: Erik Gardner; Matt Cunningham
- Based on: "The Mangler" by Stephen King
- Produced by: Mark Burman; Scott Pearlman
- Starring: Aimee Brooks; Reggie Bannister; Weston Blakesley; Scott Speiser; Juliana Dever; Sarah Lilly
- Cinematography: Thaddeus Wadleigh
- Edited by: Matthew Cassel
- Music by: Climax Golden Twins
- Distributed by: Lions Gate Entertainment, Baseline StudioSystems
- Release date: November 29, 2005
- Running time: 84 minutes
- Country: United States
- Language: English

The Mangler Reborn is a 2005 American horror film and the third entry in the Mangler film series based on a 1972 short story by Stephen King. The film was released straight to DVD on November 29, 2005 by Lions Gate Entertainment and Baseline StudioSystems. Directors Gardner and Cunningham intended the film to be a "rebirth" of the film franchise, with the film not requiring viewers to have seen the prior two films. It is an alternate sequel to the first film instead of The Mangler 2.

== Plot ==
The movie takes place after the events in the first film and follows Hadley (Weston Blakesley), a repairman that purchases the possessed machine from the first film and becomes obsessed with it. Hadley awakens the machine with his blood and after being "eaten" by it, is forced to feed it new blood to stop his corpse from rotting. One day, a young woman named Jamie comes home, having been fired from her job as an executive after getting into a fight with her boss.

Her boyfriend, Sean, having heard about her workplace incident, breaks up with her and moves out of the house. While showering her water unexpectedly shuts off. She calls Hadley to repair her water heater. With her back turned, Hadley knocks her unconscious and takes her back to his home, which is now fortified with a security system and deadly booby traps. Rick and Mike, a father/son burglary duo, try to break into Hadley's home after hearing that he received a large life insurance payout.

Rick breaks in and finds that he can't get out. After hearing another victim named Gwen Wallach's cries for help, he tries to help her, but Hadley comes home and beats Rick to death with a ballpean hammer, and feeds him to his machine. Mike walks into the house while Hadley is away, and tries to help Jamie get out of the house despite just wanting to take the money and leave.

Hadley discovers that Mike is inside the house tries to kill him, but accidentally disables his security system, unlocking the room Jamie was in, freeing her. Meanwhile Mike starts to fight Hadley, who kills him by shoving him head first into the Mangler. Jamie and Hadley fight, resulting in both of them falling into the Mangler. A week later, Hadley, having survived, rings the doorbell of another potential victim.

== Cast ==
- Aimee Brooks as Jamie
- Reggie Bannister as Rick
- Weston Blakesley as Hadley
- Scott Speiser as Mike
- Juliana Dever as Louise Watson
- Sarah Lilly as Beatrice Watson
- Renee Dorian as Gwen
- Rhett Giles as Sean
- Jeff Burr as Lawnmowing Man

== Reception ==
Critical reception for The Mangler Reborn was largely negative. DVD Talk panned the film, criticizing it as "a formless, meandering, and stunningly boring little turkey". Reel Film also gave a negative review, writing that while "the film comes off as a masterpiece when compared with its predecessors, The Mangler Reborn ultimately just doesn't work".
