= Mangling =

The term mangling may refer to:

- name mangling in computer software
- using a mangle as a laundry device
- changing, mutilating or disfiguring by cutting, tearing, rearranging etc.: see wikt:mangle
