= The Mangler =

1978 short story by Stephen King

- Short story by Stephen King
- Country: United States
- Language: English
- Genres: Horror, short story

Publication
- Published in: Night Shift, Stephen King Goes to the Movies
- Publisher: Doubleday
- Media type: Print (Hardcover)
- Publication date: 1978

"The Mangler" is a short story by Stephen King, first published in the December 1972 issue of Cavalier magazine, and later collected in King's 1978 collection Night Shift.

== Setting ==
"The Mangler" is set in an American town, and the action largely takes place in an industrial laundry. Stephen King has stated that, among the many jobs he took to support his family before he became famous, he worked in an industrial laundry.

== Plot summary ==
Police detective John Hunton investigates a fatal accident at the Blue Ribbon Laundry in which worker Adelle Frawley was killed. Frawley was somehow pulled into the laundry's speed ironing and folding machine, which the workers colloquially refer to as "the mangler." Hunton is disturbed by the sight of Frawley's grisly remains and expects that the laundry's owners will be jailed for negligence in Frawley's death, but he is surprised when a formal inquest absolves the laundry of any wrongdoing. Roger Martin, an inspector involved with the inquest, informs Hunton that a thorough inspection of the mangler revealed no problems with it, and that the machine is equipped with safety measures designed specifically to prevent exactly what happened to Frawley; the accident that killed her should have been impossible.

Over the days that follow, more accidents occur at the Blue Ribbon. A steam line feeding the mangler ruptures, burning several laundry workers, and foreman George Stanner is later maimed when the machine nearly pulls him in just as it did Frawley, forcing a maintenance man to sever Stanner's arm with a fire axe in order to save his life. Witnesses report that the mangler could not be shut off, even after its fuses had been pulled, and that the strange incidents involving the speed ironer began about a week before Frawley's death, when young worker Sherry Ouelette accidentally cut her finger and spilled her blood on the machine. Hunton interviews Ouelette and learns that she is a virgin.

Hunton's friend Mark Jackson, an English professor with an interest in occult literature, hypothesizes that through a confluence of unrelated events, the mangler has incidentally consumed several ingredients (the blood of a virgin, from Ouelette; bat's blood, from a bat nesting in the decrepit laundry; and horse's hoof from a container of Jell-O in a bag lunch) that are commonly used in occult rituals, inadvertently summoning a demon that has now possessed the mangler. To remove it, Hunton and Jackson prepare to exorcise the machine. They are concerned that the ingredients used in the summoning might include belladonna (referred to in Jackson's archaic texts as "the hand of glory"), which would call a significantly stronger demon, but they discount this possibility as the plant is not indigenous to the area. The two men travel to the Blue Ribbon to conduct the exorcism.

Unbeknownst to Hunton and Jackson, the mangler has consumed belladonna, as it was an active ingredient in antacid tablets that Frawley accidentally dropped into the mangler shortly before her death. As a result, their attempt to exorcise the machine fails, and instead of weakening the demon, the botched ritual only serves to strengthen it. The mangler begins to rip itself loose from the concrete floor of the laundry, "like a dinosaur trying to escape a tar pit," and kills Jackson.

Hunton flees to the home of Roger Martin and implores him to destroy the mangler before collapsing in a faint. Martin picks up the telephone, but before he can call anyone, he realizes from the increasingly loud metallic sounds outside and the scent of blood in the air that the mangler has already broken free of its moorings and is now roaming the streets in search of prey.

== Adaptations ==
This story was adapted for the screenplay of a 1995 film (directed by Tobe Hooper) of the same title, though the brevity of the source material required significant additions not present in the original tale. The film, starring Robert Englund (of Freddy Krueger fame), was followed by two sequels, The Mangler 2 and The Mangler Reborn. Both are alternating sequels to the first film.

== See also ==
- Stephen King short fiction bibliography
