= The Mangler (film) =

1995 film by Tobe Hooper

- Theatrical release poster
- Directed by: Tobe Hooper
- Screenplay by: Tobe Hooper; Stephen David Brooks; Peter Welbeck
- Based on: "The Mangler" by Stephen King
- Produced by: Anant Singh
- Starring: Robert Englund; Ted Levine; Daniel Matmor
- Cinematography: Amnon Salomon
- Edited by: David Heitner
- Music by: Barrington Pheloung
- Production companies: Allied Film; Distant Horizon
- Distributed by: New Line Cinema
- Release date: 3 March 1995
- Running time: 106 minutes
- Countries: United Kingdom; South Africa; United States
- Language: English
- Box office: $1.8 million (domestic)

The Mangler is a 1995 supernatural horror film directed by Tobe Hooper and written by Hooper and Harry Alan Towers (under the pseudonym of Peter Welbeck). The film is based upon the Stephen King 1972 short story of the same name, which appeared in his 1978 inaugural short story collection Night Shift. It stars Robert Englund and Ted Levine. It also spawned two direct-to-video sequels, The Mangler 2 and The Mangler Reborn.

== Plot ==
The Mangler, in Gartley's Blue Ribbon Laundry service, is a laundry press owned by Bill Gartley. Gartley's niece, Sherry, accidentally cuts herself on a lever connected to the machine and splashes blood on the Mangler's tread while trying to avoid being crushed by an old ice box some movers are clumsily carrying past. Sparks and light streams occur when the blood and the ice box come into close contact with the Mangler. Later, Mrs. Frawley, an elderly worker struggling to open a bottle of antacids, spills them on the moving tread. When she attempts to collect them, the safety shield inexplicably lifts up and traps her hand inside, followed by her body getting pulled into the machine, crushed and folded like a sheet.

Police officer John Hunton, with the help of his demonologist brother-in-law Mark, investigates the incident and others. Mark tries to convince Hunton that the machine may be possessed and the only way to stop the deaths is to exorcise the machine to dispel whatever demon is inhabiting it. They also learn that Gartley and the town elders have sacrificed their virginal daughters to the machine on their 16th birthdays in exchange for wealth and power, with Gartley planning to do the same to Sherry.

With Sherry's help, the two men attempt to exorcise the demon – which also kills Gartley, his lover and protégé Lin Sue, and the laundry's foreman Stanner – by reciting a prayer and administering holy water. The machine gives one last groan and shuts down. As the three sigh with relief, Hunton takes some antacids, admitting to Mark that they belonged to Mrs. Frawley. Mark suddenly realizes that the key ingredient in the antacids is deadly nightshade, also called "the Hand of Glory" as outlined in his occult book. Since the machine was accidentally fed the same antacids, Mark realizes that not only was the exorcism useless, as the demon is still alive, it is now stronger than ever. The machine bursts to life and appears to have a mind of its own, shedding pieces of metal and rising like a wild beast. The three run through the warehouse, chased by the now-mobile Mangler. The Mangler tears Mark apart, killing him, while John and Sherry descend a flight of stairs. In their hurry to escape, they fall through a large manhole into the sewer below. Suddenly, something falls from the machine into the water, and a mechanical wail ensues. The machine draws back and becomes still, and John and Sherry escape.

While waiting to hear news of Sherry, John receives a letter from his departed friend and confidant, photographer J.J.J. Pictureman, who warns him not to trust anyone in the town missing a body part as they are possessed by the Mangler. John discovers that the machine has returned to its place on the floor and resumed its duties as a speed ironer, and Sherry, now missing her ring finger from her encounter with the Mangler, has taken her uncle's place as the new tyrannical owner of the Blue Ribbon Laundry. John throws away the flowers he brought her and leaves the factory for good.

== Cast ==
- Robert Englund as William "Bill" Gartley
- Ted Levine as Officer John Hunton
- Daniel Matmor as Mark Jackson
- Jeremy Crutchley as J.J.J. Pictureman / Mortician
- Vanessa Pike as Sherry Ouelette
- Demetre Phillips as George Stanner
- Lisa Morris as Lin Sue
- Vera Blacker as Adelle Frawley
- Danny Keogh as Herb Diment
- Larry Taylor as Sheriff Hughes
- Ron Smerczak as Officer Steele

== Release ==
The Mangler was released in the US on 3 March 1995. The movie was later released on VHS in South Africa by Ster-Kinekor Home Video.

New Line Home Entertainment released it on DVD on 17 August 2004.

In its first week, it underperformed and took in $1.1M on 800 screens at the US box office. It also failed in the European box office.

== Reception ==
On film review aggregator website Rotten Tomatoes, the film holds a 27% approval rating based on 11 reviews. Richard Harrington of The Washington Post wrote, "The Mangler is ludicrous from start to finish: its plot lines dangle, its effects fail to dazzle and the acting and directing are uniformly bad. [...] even the least demanding of genre fans will be hard-pressed to tremble in its presence". Marc Savlov of The Austin Chronicle wrote: "Perhaps it's time for Tobe Hooper to hang up his light meter. After a string of disappointments culminating in this silly waste of time, it's hard to care if horror's golden boy carries on or not". Godfrey Cheshire of Variety called its villain a "silly contrivance" and described the acting and story as lackluster. Stephen Holden of The New York Times called it "a potpourri of supernatural clichés and warmed-over Stephen King notions about corruption randomly stuck together with fill-in-the-blanks dialogue". David Kronke of the Los Angeles Times wrote: "Consider, for a second, what you might honestly expect from a movie called The Mangler. Well, it doesn't even aim that high". Steven Rea of The Philadelphia Inquirer called it a "plodding and virtually plotless" film that should have been played for laughs. Stephen Hunter of The Baltimore Sun stated the film recycles common Stephen King themes, but the film's novelty makes it enjoyable for horror fans.

The Mangler fared somewhat better with retrospective reviews from critics. Bloody Disgusting rated it 3/5 stars and wrote that the film "is not good by any objective standards, but it's a fun little gory time-killer with a possessed refrigerator and an evil laundry press. That can't be all bad". Jon Condit of Dread Central rated it 3.5/5 stars and wrote: "The Mangler is a true test for the guilty pleasure connoisseur. Bad in every respect, there are definitely worse ways to blow two hours of your time (this film's sequel comes to mind); it's just a shame Hooper was implicated in it". Mike Long of DVD Talk rated it 0.5/5 stars and wrote: "There have been many bad, throw-away projects based on material from Stephen King, but The Mangler has to be one of the worst. The movie's laughable premise is only brought down by the inept filmmaking on display here". David Johnson of DVD Verdict wrote that the film "features a lot of gore, a solid, creepy atmosphere, some wonky special effects, all set against a really dumb premise".

Film critic Scout Tafoya of RogerEbert.com included The Mangler in his video series "The Unloved", where he highlights films which received mixed to negative reviews yet he believes to have artistic value. Tafoya considers the film to be "up there with [Christine] and [The Shining]" as among the best Stephen King adaptations, "in that it's a stylistic representation of the director's obsessions, not just a boilerplate transposition of his text". Tafoya further lamented that "[i]t's perversely fitting that his greatest failure is about the very machinery of capitalism that would imprison him in the world of low-budget productions.... The Mangler was a kind of oddball film with an unknowable center that had become a rarity in American cinema. That just makes it that much more special".

== See also ==
- Death Bed: The Bed That Eats, another horror film with an inanimate antagonist
