= Seamus Dever =

American actor

- Dever at Dragon Con in 2026
- Born: Seamus Patrick Dever; July 27, 1976 (age 50); Flint, Michigan, U.S.
- Occupation: Actor
- Years active: 1999–present
- Spouse: Juliana Dever (m. 2006)

Seamus Patrick Dever (born July 27, 1976) is an American actor known for his role as Detective Kevin Ryan in the ABC series Castle.

== Early life ==
Dever was born in Flint, Michigan, and moved at the age of six to Bullhead City, Arizona, where he grew up. He graduated as valedictorian of Mohave High School, completed his undergraduate studies at Northern Arizona University, and holds MFAs in Acting from the Moscow Art Theatre and Carnegie-Mellon University.

== Personal life ==
A lifetime member of the Actors Studio, Dever married Juliana Dever on May 27, 2006. Juliana played Kevin Ryan's wife Jenny on Castle. He is a cousin of Broadway actress Jeanne Arnold and Canadian singer-songwriter Feist.

Dever and his wife are vegetarians. Both are also supporters of Best Friends Animal Society.

Dever also starred in a celebrity episode of the American version of The Chase, in Season 3 (2014), where he scored 11 questions in the preliminaries and led a team with Dean Cain to defeat the Chaser, Mark Labbett.

== Filmography ==
=== Film ===
Year	Title	Role	Notes
2001	Shooting LA	Colin	
2002	Monkey Love	Aaron Miles	Credited as Séamus Dever
2002	Outside the Law	Rick Michell	
2006	Hollywoodland	Phillip	
2008	Affairs in Order	Cyrus	
2008	The Essence of Depp	Dylan	
2009	Ready or Not	Marc	
2014	Sequestered	Obama	Short film
2015	The Extraordinary Farewell	H. Henry Locke	
2023	Invitation to a Murder	Lawrence Kane	
2023	A Great Divide	Tom Drake	

=== Television ===
Year	Title	Role	Notes
1999	Pensacola: Wings of Gold	Lewis	1 episode: "Behind Enemy Lines"
2001	She's No Angel	Cricket	TV movie
2001	Undressed	Randy	1 episode: "Episode #4.1"
2001	Crossing Jordan	Tom Murch	1 episode: "Believers"
2003	Without a Trace	Ronald Phelps	1 episode: "Moving On"
2004	Cold Case	Hank Dempsey	1 episode: "The House"
2005	Mystery Woman: Snapshot	Billy	TV movie
2005	JAG	Caden Duran	1 episode: "San Diego"
2005	Charmed	Mitchell Haines	1 episode: "Freaky Phoebe"
2005	McBride: The Doctor Is Out...Really Out	Allan	TV movie
2005	Threshold	Agent Detoro	2 episodes: "Trees Made of Glass: Part 2", "Blood of the Children"
2005	CSI: Crime Scene Investigation	Adam Gilford	1 episode: "Bite Me"
2006	CSI: NY	Charles Cooper	1 episode: "Live or Let Die"
2006	NCIS	Graham Thomas	1 episode: "Singled Out"
2007	Close to Home	Justin Matthews	1 episode: "Making Amends"
2007	CSI: Miami	Paul Billings	1 episode: "Kill Switch"
2008	General Hospital	Dr. Ian Devlin	45 episodes
2008	Mad Men	Chuck	1 episode: "For Those Who Think Young"
2008	Army Wives	Dr. Chris Ferlinghetti	7 episodes
2008	Ghost Whisperer	Rich Henderson	1 episode: "Save Our Souls"
2008	CSI: Crime Scene Investigation	Drew Rich	1 episode: "Young Man with a Horn"
2009	Drop Dead Diva	Tyler Mack	1 episode: "The Dress"
2009–2016	Castle	Detective Kevin Ryan	Main cast 173 episodes Nominated – People's Choice Award for Favorite TV Bromance (shared with Jon Huertas)
2010	Dark Blue	Nick Perry	2 episodes: "Dead Flowers", "Personal Effects"
2012	Chelsea Lately	Kevin Ryan in Castle	1 episode: "Episode 6.187 (Himself playing his Castle character)"
2014	The Chase	Himself	1 episode: "Starry Eyed: Celebrity Episode"
2018	Legion	Don Eichman	1 episode: "Chapter 14"
2018	Take Two	Todd Garlin	1 episode: "Death Becomes Him"
2018–2019	Titans	Trigon	Recurring; 3 episodes
2019	Macgyver	CIA Officer Griggs	1 Episode Mac+Fallout+Jack
2019	The Rookie	Chaz Bachman	Episode: "The Bet"
2020	NCIS: Los Angeles	Alexi Gonchgarov	Episode: "Russia, Russia, Russia"
2023	True Lies	Reed Kessler	Episode: "Honest Manipulations"
2023	NCIS: Hawai'i	Scott	Episode: "Nightwatch Two"
2024	Tracker	Max Miller	Episode: "Man's Best Friend"
2024-	NCIS	Gabriel LaRoche	Recurring 3 episodes

=== Video games ===
Year	Title	Role
2002	Soldier of Fortune II: Double Helix	Additional voices
2018	Far Cry 5	John Seed
2024	Call of Duty: Black Ops 6	Felix Neumann
