= Molly C. Quinn =

American actress

Molly Quinn
- Quinn at Dragon Con in 2026
- Born: Molly Caitlyn Quinn; October 8, 1993 (age 33); Texarkana, Texas, U.S.
- Occupation: Actress
- Years active: 2006–present
- Spouse: Elan Gale (m. 2024)

Molly Caitlyn Quinn (born October 8, 1993) is an American actress who has worked in theatre, film, and television. Her roles include Alexis Castle, daughter of the title character on ABC's Castle.

== Life and career ==
Molly Caitlyn Quinn was born on October 8, 1993 in Texarkana, Texas. She began taking weekly acting lessons from director and producer Martin Beck after performing in a community production of The Nutcracker at age six. In the sixth grade, she auditioned at the Young Actors Studio, and after six months of "intensive [acting] training", signed with the Osbrink agency and Management 360.

From 2009 to 2016, she starred in the ABC mystery drama series Castle as Alexis Castle, the lead character's daughter. She also played the character Sally Campbell in one episode.

From 2011 to 2015, Quinn performed the lead role of Bloom in Nickelodeon's revival of the animated series Winx Club. At first, she tried a "cartoony" voice for her character. Nickelodeon advised her to use her real voice instead, saying, "No, we want voices of real girls this time around." Quinn also voiced Bloom in the re-records of the first and second films based on the series.

In March 2014, Quinn appeared as the voice of the sentient computer Fey, in the episode "Numbers" of the podcast series Welcome to Night Vale.

In 2021, she starred in the horror movie Agnes.

In 2025, Quinn appeared in the videogame Death Stranding 2: On the Beach as La Madre (Villa Libre), one of the celebrity hologram quest NPC's.

== Filmography ==
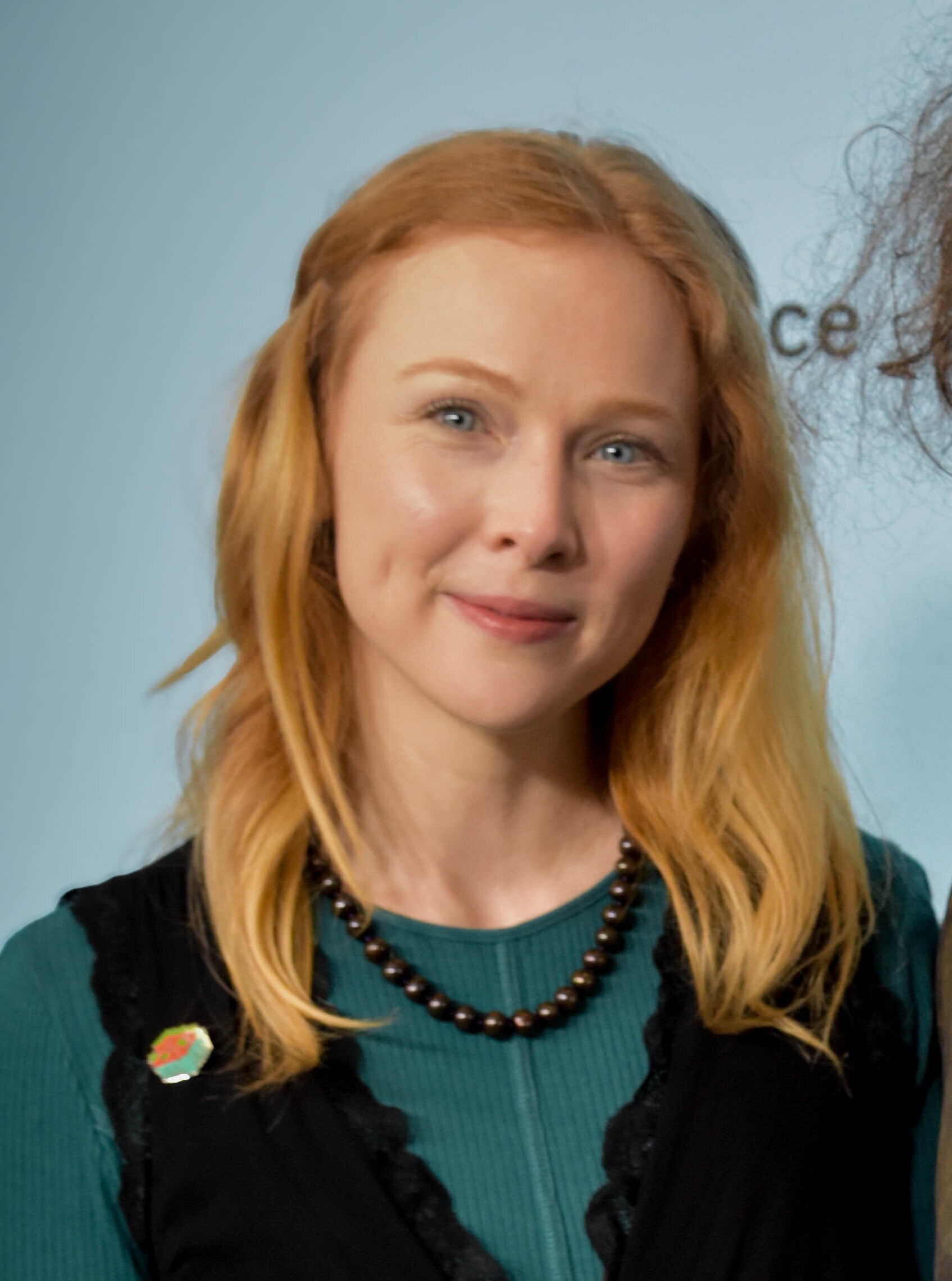
Molly Quinn in 2025

Film performances
Year	Title	Role	Notes
2007	Walk Hard: The Dewey Cox Story	Teen with Pinups	
2009	My One and Only	Paula	
2009	Disney's A Christmas Carol	Belinda Cratchit	Voice role
2009	The Sacrifice	Esmee Johnson	Short film; Monaco International Film Festival Best Newcomer
2012	The First Time	Erica	
2012	Winx Club: The Secret of the Lost Kingdom	Princess Bloom	Nickelodeon English version
2013	Winx Club 3D: Magical Adventure	Princess Bloom	Nickelodeon English version
2013	Hansel & Gretel Get Baked	Gretel Jaeger	Also associate producer
2013	Superman: Unbound	Supergirl / Kara	Voice role
2013	We're the Millers	Melissa Fitzgerald	
2015	Welcome to Happiness	Lillian	
2017	Guardians of the Galaxy Vol. 2	Molly	
2017	Last Rampage	Marisa	
2018	Newly Single	Valerie	
2019	Doctor Sleep	Mrs. Grady	
2021	Agnes	Mary	
2023	Guardians of the Galaxy Vol. 3	Molly	
2024	The Life of Chuck	Chuck's mother	Also executive producer

Television performances
Year	Title	Role	Notes
2009–2016	Castle	Alexis Castle	Main cast
2010	Avalon High	Jen	Disney Channel original movie
2011	Ben 10: Ultimate Alien	Eunice	Voice role; 2 episodes
2011–2014	Winx Club	Princess Bloom, Lockette	Main voice role (seasons 3–6)
2019	The Fix	Lindsay Meyer	2 episodes
2019	The InBetween	Andrea Squire	Episode: "Let Me in Your Window"
2021, 2023	The Rookie	Ashley	2 episodes
2023	The Fall of the House of Usher	Jenny	Episode: "The Masque of the Red Death"
2024	Scare Tactics	Various	3 episodes

Other work
Year	Title	Role	Notes
2011	The 3rd Birthday	Eve Brea	Video game
2011	City of Fallen Angels	Narrator	Audiobook version
2012–2015	Thrilling Adventure Hour	Pemily Stallwark	Podcast; 12 episodes
2013	Release the Panic	Cameo	Music video
2014–2019	Welcome to Night Vale	Fey / Intern Molly / Melony	Podcast; 8 episodes
2015	Princess Rap Battle	Hermione Granger	YouTube video series, 1 episode
2018	Artifact	Jolixia the Card Faun	Video game
2022	Unlicensed	Molly Hatch	Podcast; 12 episodes
2025	Death Stranding 2: On the Beach	La Madre	Video game

== Awards ==
Year	Association	Category	Work	Result
2009	Monaco International Film Festival	Best Newcomer, Short Film	The Sacrifice	Won
