= Juliana Dever =

American actress and travel blogger

- Born: December 17, 1980 (age 45); St. Louis, Missouri, U.S.
- Occupation: Actress
- Years active: 2005-present
- Spouse: Seamus Dever (2006-present)

Juliana Dever (born December 17, 1980) is an American actress and travel blogger. Dever is best known for her recurring role on crime drama Castle as Jennifer "Jenny" Ryan. In 2016, Dever produced and starred in the VR web series Touched By Destiny.

== Personal life ==
Dever was born and raised in St. Louis, Missouri, on December 17, 1980. She trained as an actress at the Moscow Art Theatre in Russia. She is married to actor Seamus Dever, with whom she starred on Castle as his on-screen wife, Jenny Ryan. They married in 2006.

Dever and her husband are vegetarians. Both are also supporters of Best Friends Animal Society.

== Filmography ==
=== Film ===
Year	Title	Role	Notes
2004	The List	Christine O'Brien	
2004	A Lousy 10 Grand	Woman in Cubicle	
2006	Time and Tide	Renee	
2007	Into the Arms of Strangers	Sam	
2008	Affairs in Order	Kate	
2009	Ready or Not	Maid of Honor	
2011	George	Grace	Short film
2012	Retail Therapy	Julia De La Croix	Short film Also producer

=== Television ===
Year	Title	Role	Notes
2009	Criminal Minds	Shelia Coakley	1 episode: "Roadkill"
2010–2016	Castle	Jenny Ryan (née Duffy-O'Malley)	8 episodes
2012	Scandal	Julie Loeb	1 episode: "Hunting Season"
2020	Another Mother	Nina Munson	Television Film
2021	9-1-1	Rachel Hawkerson	2 episodes
2025	Law & Order	Joy Andrews	1 episode: "Folk Hero"

=== Video ===
Year	Title	Role	Notes
2005	The Mangler Reborn	Louise Watson	
2005	Sasquatch Hunters	Louise Keaton	
