= Jon Huertas =

American actor (born 1969)

- Jon Huertas on the set of The Rookie
- Born: Jonathan William Scott Hofstedt; October 23, 1969 (age 57); New York City, U.S.
- Occupation: Actor
- Years active: 1993–present
- Spouse: Nicole Bordges (m. 2014)

Jonathan William Scott Hofstedt (born October 23, 1969) is an American actor. Known professionally as Jon Huertas, he is best known for his role as homicide detective Javier Esposito in Castle, witch hunter Brad Alcerro in Sabrina the Teenage Witch, Sergeant Antonio 'Poke' Espera in HBO's Generation Kill, Joe Negroni in the film Why Do Fools Fall in Love, and Miguel Rivas in This Is Us.

== Early life ==
Huertas was born in northern Virginia but brought up in New York City to a Puerto Rican father and an American mother. He was raised by his grandparents. By ten years of age, he began taking part in school plays, which was his first inspiration to pursue acting. Huertas graduated John Handley High School in Winchester, Virginia, in 1987 at the age of 17. After spending a year attending college, he enlisted in the United States Air Force in 1987 and served for eight years as an aircraft nuclear/conventional weapons specialist. He participated in Operation Just Cause and Operation Desert Storm.

== Career ==
A chance encounter with Woody Harrelson in 1991 encouraged Huertas to further pursue an acting career, which started in 1993 when he played an uncredited part in The Webbers.

In 1998, Huertas portrayed Joe Negroni in the romantic drama Why Do Fools Fall in Love alongside such stars as Halle Berry, Paul Mazursky, and Ben Vereen. In 1999, he appeared in two films: the horror movie Cold Hearts and the action movie Stealth Fighter. In the 2000s, he appeared in many films, but his biggest role was in television in 2008 as Sergeant Espera in HBO's miniseries Generation Kill about the 2003 invasion of Iraq.

From 1998 to 1999, Huertas played the role of Antonio in the television series Moesha. From 1999 to 2000, he played Brad, a witch hunter, in Sabrina, the Teenage Witch. From 2009 to 2016, Huertas starred in the role of Detective Esposito in ABC's police procedural Castle. In 2012, Huertas and his Castle co-star Stana Katic received the award for Performance in a Drama Episode at the 16th Annual PRISM Awards.

Huertas was elected to serve a one-year term, beginning September 25, 2010, as an alternate member of the National Board of Directors and as a member of the Hollywood Division Board of Directors of the Screen Actors Guild.

Huertas joined the cast of This Is Us in 2016 for the show's first season. In an interview with Tell-Tale TV, Huertas said he didn't know at first that his character Miguel on This Is Us would be aged, or that he would wind up married to Mandy Moore's character, Rebecca.

In October 2019, Huertas appeared on The Rookie. He played Alejandro Mejia/Cesar Ojeda in the episode "The Bet", reuniting with former co-stars from Castle, Nathan Fillion and Seamus Dever, as part of ABC's Cast from the Past Week.

== Personal life ==
Huertas married his long-term girlfriend, Nicole Bordges, in Tulum, Mexico, on May 4, 2014.

== Filmography ==
=== Film ===
Year	Title	Role	Notes
1996	Executive Decision	Sammy, Terrorist	
1996	South Bureau Homicide	Officer #2	
1998	Why Do Fools Fall in Love?	Joe Negroni	
1999	Cold Hearts	Darius	
1999	Stealth Fighter	Lt. Bradley Elias	
2000	Buddy Boy	Omar	
2000	Auggie Rose	Paramedic #1	
2000	Picking Up the Pieces	Paulo	Credited as John Huertas
2000	A Family in Crisis: The Elian Gonzales Story	Rafael	
2001	Green Diggity Dog	Tim Porter	
2002	Bug	Mitchell	
2002	Borderline	Ciro Ruiz	
2003	El Gusano	Dan	
2005	Induction	Rico Rodriguez	
2006	The Yardsale	Chuy	
2006	Right at Your Door	Rick	
2006	Hot Tamale	Alex	
2007	The Insatiable	Javier	
2007	Making it Legal	Mike Carlton	
2007	Believers	Victor	
2008	The Objective	Sergeant Vincent Degetau	
2011	Beverly Hills Chihuahua 2	Alberto	
2012	Stash House	Ray Jaffe	
2014	Reparation	Jerome Keller	
2017	Altered Perception	Andrew	
2019	Imprisoned	Diaz	
2020	Initiation	Officer Rico Martinez	
2022	Prisoner's Daughter	Joseph	
2026	California Scenario	Joe	Also producer

=== Television ===
Year	Title	Role	Notes
1993	The Webbers	Pimp - Uncredited	1 episode
1995	Beverly Hills, 90210	Peter Manguson	1 episode
1997	JAG	Cayuga Helmsman and Ramirez	2 episodes
1998	Nash Bridges	Hustler	1 episode
1998	Moesha	Antonio	8 episodes
1999	St. Michael's Crossing		
1999	Undressed	Evan	6 episodes
1999	Time of Your Life	Unknown	1 episode
1999	Sabrina, the Teenage Witch	Brad Alcerro	12 episodes
2000	Touched by an Angel	Warren	1 episode
2001	Resurrection Blvd.	Unknown	1 episode
2002	NYPD Blue	Juan	Episode: "Less is Morte"
2002	The Shield	Robbie Villanueva	2 episodes
2004	The Division	Juan	1 episode
2004	The Joe Schmo Show	T.J. "The Playah"	9 episodes
2004	Crossing Jordan	Manuel Rios	1 episode
2005	Without a Trace	Luis Alvarez	1 episode
2005	CSI: Crime Scene Investigation	Psych Tech Leon Madera	1 episode
2005	Cold Case	Carlos	1 episode
2006	Invasion	National Guardsman	1 episode
2007	Prison Break	DeJesus	1 episode
2008	Generation Kill	Sergeant Antonio "Poke" Espera	Miniseries; 7 episodes
2008	Terminator: The Sarah Connor Chronicles	Trevor	1 episode
2008	NCIS	Sergeant Jack Kale	1 episode
2009	Dark Blue	Chavez	1 episode
2009–2016	Castle	Javier "Javi" Esposito	Main role; 173 episodes
2012	Chelsea Lately	Javier Esposito in Castle	1 episode
2016–2019	Elementary	Halcon	3 episodes
2016	Con Man	Diego Alfonso	2 episodes
2016–2022	This Is Us	Miguel Rivas	Recurring (season 1); Main role (season 2–6)
2019	The Rookie	Alejandro Mejia/Cesar Ojeda	1 episode "The Bet"

=== Directing credits ===
Television
Year	Title	Notes
2016–2022	This Is Us	2 episodes
2022–2026	The Rookie	3 episodes
2023	The Rookie: Feds	1 episode
2023	The Company You Keep	1 episode
2024–2026	Tracker	3 episodes
2025	The Irrational	1 episode
2025	Ballard	1 episode

== See also ==
- List of Puerto Ricans
