= Always Greener season 2 =

Always Greener
- Season 2
- No. of episodes: 28

Release
- Original network: Channel Seven
- Original release: 8 September 2002 – 8 June 2003

Season chronology
- ← Previous; Season 1

The second and final season of the Australian family drama Always Greener began airing on 8 September 2002 and concluded on 8 June 2003 with a total of 28 episodes.

== Cast ==
=== Regular ===
- John Howard as John Taylor
- Anne Tenney as Liz Taylor
- Michala Banas as Marissa Taylor
- Daniel Bowden as Jason Taylor
- Abe Forsythe as Campbell Todd
- Natasha Lee as Kim Taylor
- Scott Major as Tom Morgan
- Caitlin McDougall as Sandra Todd
- Bree Walters as Philippa Todd
- Clayton Watson as Mickey Steele

=== Semi-Regular ===
- Georgie Shew as Katy Turnball
- Denise Roberts as Isabelle Turnball
- Andrew Clarke as Derek Unn
- Merridy Eastman as Eileen Unn
- Nathaniel Dean as Patch
- Peter Corbett as Bert Adams
- Bree Desborough as Shelley Southall

=== Recurring ===
- Steven Rooke as Nick Greenhill
- Grant Bowler as Greg Steele (episodes 1–7)
- Matt Passmore as Pete Jones (episodes 13–28)

=== Guest ===
- Hamish Thompson as Bomber O'Casey
- Lynette Curran as Connie Linguini
- Alex Blias as Mark 'Skid' Pannas

== Episodes ==
No. overall	No. in season	Title	Directed by	Written by	Original release date
23	1	"Here We Go Again"	Scott Hartford Davis	Margaret Wilson	8 September 2002
24	2	"Endangered Species"	Scott Hartford Davis	Jutta Goetze	15 September 2002
25	3	"Two Sides to Every Story"	Mark Piper	Anthony Ellis	22 September 2002
26	4	"Black, White and Grey"	Mark Piper	Mardi McConnochie	29 September 2002
27	5	"It Takes Balls"	Chris Martin-Jones	Sarah Duffy	6 October 2002
28	6	"In the Beginning, I Was Afraid"	Chris Martin-Jones	Margaret Wilson	13 October 2002
29	7	"Opening Gambit"	Scott Hartford Davis	Tracey Trinder	27 October 2002
30	8	"Share Space"	Scott Hartford Davis	Grant Wolf	3 November 2002
31	9	"Understanding the Cry"	Cath Roden	Louise Fox	10 November 2002
32	10	"Why is It So?"	Cath Roden	Marieke Josephine Hardy	17 November 2002
33	11	"A Death in the Family"	Chris Martin-Jones	Andrew Kelly	24 November 2002
34	12	"Guilt Trip"	Chris Martin-Jones	Sue Hore	16 February 2003
35	13	"The Always Greener Variety Hour"	Scott Hartford Davis	Anthony Ellis	23 February 2003
36	14	"Flesh for Fantasy"	Scott Hartford Davis	Elizabeth Coleman	2 March 2003
37	15	"You Must Have Been a Beautiful Baby"	Catherine Millar	Anthony Ellis	9 March 2003
38	16	"The Long Weekend"	Catherine Millar	Margaret Wilson	16 March 2003
39	17	"Great (and Not So Great) Expectations"	Chris Martin-Jones	Marieke Josephine Hardy	23 March 2003
40	18	"...And Greener...and Greener"	Chris Martin-Jones	Abe Pogos	30 March 2003
41	19	"More Things in Heaven and Earth, Elizabeth"	Mark Piper	Anthony Ellis	6 April 2003
42	20	"A Tangled Web"	Mark Piper	Boaz Stark	13 April 2003
43	21	"Cause and Effect"	Pino Amenta	Fiona Wood	20 April 2003
44	22	"Surfboards in the Roof"	Pino Amenta	Jutta Goetze	27 April 2003
45	23	"The Trouble is it's Christmas"	Kate Woods	Jason Herbison	4 May 2003
46	24	"What a Difference a Year Makes"	Kate Woods	Louise Fox	11 May 2003
47	25	"Boxing Day"	Mark Piper	Marieke Josephine Hardy	18 May 2003
48	26	"5,4,3,2,1... Happy New Year"	Mark Piper	Margaret Wilson	25 May 2003
49	27	"True Romance"	Catherine Millar	Jason Herbison	1 June 2003
50	28	"Future Shocks"	Catherine Millar	Anthony Ellis	8 June 2003
