= Always Greener season 1 =

Always Greener
- Season 1
- No. of episodes: 22

Release
- Original network: Channel Seven
- Original release: 9 September 2001 – 3 June 2002

Season chronology
- Next → Season 2

The first season of the Australian family drama Always Greener began airing on 9 September 2001 and concluded on 3 June 2002 with a total of 22 episodes.

== Cast ==
=== Regular ===
- John Howard as John Taylor
- Anne Tenney as Liz Taylor
- Michala Banas as Marissa Taylor
- Daniel Bowden as Jason Taylor
- Abe Forsythe as Campbell Todd
- Natasha Lee as Kim Taylor
- Scott Major as Tom Morgan
- Caitlin McDougall as Sandra Todd
- Bree Walters as Philippa Todd
- Clayton Watson as Mickey Steele

=== Semi-Regular ===
- Georgie Shew as Katy Turnball
- Denise Roberts as Isabelle Turnball
- Andrew Clarke as Derek Unn
- Peter Corbett as Bert Adams
- Bree Desborough as Shelley Southall
- Grant Bowler as Greg Steele
- Drayton Morley as Robert Todd

=== Recurring ===
- Merridy Eastman as Eileen Unn
- Nathaniel Dean as Patch
- Steven Rooke as Nick Greenhill (episodes 16–22)

=== Guest ===
- Lynette Curran as Connie Linguini
- Alex Blias as Mark 'Skid' Pannas

== Episodes ==
No. overall	No. in season	Title	Directed by	Written by	Original release date
1	1	"The Other Man's Grass"	Kevin Carlin	Anthony Ellis	9 September 2001
John and Liz Taylor are a couple of city-slickers who have three children, Marissa, Jason and Kim. Sandra Todd is John's sister and a country bumpkin, widowed with two children, Cam and Pip. John and Liz discover that Marissa is using drugs. Kim is continually bullied by older schoolgirl, Shelley. Jason falls for Katy Turnball but is warned against her due to her mother. Cam and Pip discover their dog has gotten their neighbour, Bert's dog pregnant. Sandra learns she can't pay her bills. After an innocent comment about swapping houses at Christmas time, John and Sandra decide it might be in each other's best interests and plan to move.
2	2	"Where, What, Why, When, How?"	Kevin Carlin	Anthony Ellis	16 September 2001
3	3	"Close Encounters of the Furred Kind"	Kevin Carlin	Bevan Lee	23 September 2001
4	4	"Movers and Shakers"	Scott Hartford Davis	Anthony Ellis	30 September 2001
5	5	"Pinch Me Linda, I'm Really Here!"	Scott Hartford Davis	Margaret Wilson	7 October 2001
6	6	"Keep Off the Grass"	Rob Stewart	Phillip Dalkin	14 October 2001
7	7	"Love, Pain and the Whole Damned Thing"	Rob Stewart	Louise Crane	21 October 2001
8	8	"Dog Days"	Russell Burton	Andrew Kelly	28 October 2001
9	9	"Call It Fete"	Russell Burton	Chris Bates	4 November 2001
10	10	"Sisters Are Doing it for Themselves"	Scott Hartford Davis	Tracey Trinder	11 November 2001
11	11	"The String in the Biscuit"	Scott Hartford Davis	Mardi McConnochie	18 November 2001
12	12	"The Mating Urge"	Ali Ali	Margaret Wilson	25 November 2001
13	13	"Baby Love"	Ali Ali	Ysabelle Dean	31 March 2002
14	14	"Bright Sparks"	Mark Piper	David Phillips	7 April 2002
15	15	"What's in a Name?"	Mark Piper	Mardi McConnochie	14 April 2002
16	16	"History Repeating"	Kevin Carlin	David Hannam	21 April 2002
17	17	"Extraordinary Ordinary"	Kevin Carlin	Marieke Josephine Hardy	29 April 2002
18	18	"The Good Woman's Guide to a Happy Home"	Chris Martin-Jones	Sue Hore	6 May 2002
19	19	"Mirror Image"	Chris Martin-Jones	Glen Dolman	13 May 2002
20	20	"A Cross to Bear"	Mark Piper	Anthony Ellis	20 May 2002
21	21	"A Man Walks into a Bar..."	Mark Piper	Margaret Wilson	27 May 2002
22	22	"Cliffhanger"	Kevin Carlin	Mardi McConnochie	3 June 2002
