= A Death in the Family (disambiguation) =

A Death in the Family is a 1957 novel by James Agee.

A Death in the Family may also refer to:

== Adaptations of James Agee's novel ==
- A Death in the Family, a 1983 opera by William Mayer
- A Death in the Family, a 2002 television movie starring Annabeth Gish

== Television episodes ==
- "A Death in the Family" (Always Greener), 2002
- "A Death in the Family" (Bates Motel), 2015
- "A Death in the Family" (Castle), 2009
- "A Death in the Family" (Dallas), 1987
- "A Death in the Family" (Filthy Rich & Catflap), 1987
- "A Death in the Family" (The Incredible Hulk), 1977
- "A Death in the Family" (Law & Order), 1991
- "A Death in the Family" (Night Gallery), 1971
- "A Death in the Family" (Touched by an Angel), 2001

== Other uses ==
- A Death in the Family (audio play), a 2010 audio drama based on the TV series Doctor Who
- "A Death in the Family" (comics), a 1980s Batman comic book story arc
- Batman: Death in the Family, a 2020 American animated interactive short film based on the story arc
- A Death in the Family, a 2009 novel by Karl Ove Knausgård in the My Struggle series
- "Bloody Kisses (A Death in the Family)", a 1993 song by Type O Negative from Bloody Kisses
