= Andrew Lesnie =

Australian cinematographer (1956–2015)

Andrew Lesnie ACS, ASC
- Born: 1 January 1956; Sydney, New South Wales, Australia
- Died: 27 April 2015 (aged 59); Sydney, New South Wales, Australia
- Years active: 1978–2014

Andrew Lesnie ACS ASC (1 January 1956 – 27 April 2015) was an Australian cinematographer.

He was best known for his collaboration with director Peter Jackson on The Lord of the Rings trilogy (2001–2003) and The Hobbit trilogy (2012–2014), with Lord of the Rings: The Fellowship of the Ring earning him the Academy Award for Best Cinematography.

== Early life ==
Lesnie was born in Sydney, New South Wales, on 1 January 1956, the son of Shirley (Lithgow) and Allan Lesnie, who worked for the family's company, butcher suppliers Harry Lesnie Pty Ltd.

He was educated at Sydney Grammar School. Lesnie finished 6th form and his Higher School Certificate in 1974.

== Career ==
Lesnie started his career as an assistant camera operator on the film Patrick (1978) while still studying at the Australian Film, Television and Radio School (AFTRS).

His first job after graduation in 1979 was as a cameraman on the Logie Award-winning Australian magazine-style afternoon TV show Simon Townsend's Wonder World. Simon Townsend gave Lesnie almost daily opportunities to develop his craft with little restriction over a wide variety of stories and situations, and to experiment with camera and lighting techniques in hundreds of locations and situations. After two years of working on the show, Lesnie moved on to numerous Australian film and television productions, including the mini-series Bodyline.

He later worked as a second camera assistant on the film The Killing of Angel Street (1981).

Lesnie would then go on to develop his craft as he photographed films like Stations (1983), The Delinquents (1989), Temptation of the Monk (1993), and Spider and Rose (1994).

=== The Lord of the Rings trilogy (2001–2003) ===
Lesnie used motion picture camera company Arri's Arriflex 435, Arriflex 535, and ArriCam Studio 35mm film cameras for the trilogy. He used Carl Zeiss Ultra Prime Lenses and Kodak's 5279 (tungsten-balanced) film stock to photograph the films.

He planned far ahead into the production with Jackson with previsualisation programs to help establish frame sizes and angles, as well as construction of sets. During filming, Lesnie emphasised earthy colours in the makeup and wardrobe of the cast and extras.

His work on The Fellowship of the Ring earned him the Academy Award for Best Cinematography.

At the acceptance speech, Lesnie dedicated to chief lighting technician Brian Bansgrove, who he described as a major contributor to the quality of the film's cinematography.

=== The Hobbit trilogy (2012–2014) ===
For production, Lesnie used Red Digital Cinema's Epic cameras as well as Carl Zeiss Ultra Prime Lenses to photograph the film. Jackson and Lesnie decided to shoot the film in 3D with as many as 15 stereoscopic camera rigs (2 cameras each) with 3ality. They also decided to shoot the film in an uncommon frame rate of 48 frames per second versus the industry standard of 24 frames per second. This would make Lesnie the first cinematographer to employ such a method that claims to induce more clarity, reduce motion blur, and make 3D easier to watch.

== Personal life and death ==
Lesnie lived on Sydney's north coast.

He was a member of both the Australian Cinematographers Society and the American Society of Cinematographers.

Lesnie died of a heart attack in his Sydney home on 27 April 2015, after having suffered from a heart condition for half a year.

His final film, The Water Diviner, was released in Australia in December 2014 and in America in April 2015, one week before his death.

== Filmography ==
=== Film ===
Documentary film

Year	Title	Director
1980	The Comeback	Kit Laughlin
1988	Schwarzenegger: Total Rebuild	Kit Laughlin

Short film

Year	Title	Director	Notes
1981	The Same Stream	James Bradley	
1983	Stations	Jackie McKimmie	
1984	The Man You Know	Steve Jacobs	
2013	Reunion	Simon Stone	Segment of The Turning

Feature film

Year	Title	Director	Notes
1984	Fantasy Man	John Meagher	
1985	Emoh Ruo	Denny Lawrence	
1985	Unfinished Business	Bob Ellis	
1986	Fair Game	Mario Andreacchio	
1987	Australian Dream	Jackie McKimmie	
1987	Dark Age	Arch Nicholson	
1989	The Boys in the Island	Geoff Bennett	
1989	The Delinquents	Chris Thomson	
1990	The Shrimp on the Barbie	Michael Gottlieb	Australian unit
1992	The Girl Who Came Late	Kathy Mueller	
1993	Temptation of a Monk	Clara Law	With Arthur Wong
1994	Spider and Rose	Bill Bennett	
1994	Fatal Past	Clive Fleury	
1995	Babe	Chris Noonan	
1996	Two If by Sea	Bill Bennett	
1997	Doing Time for Patsy Cline	Chris Kennedy	
1998	The Sugar Factory	Robert Carter	
1998	Babe: Pig in the City	George Miller	
2001	The Lord of the Rings: The Fellowship of the Ring	Peter Jackson	Shot back-to-back
2002	The Lord of the Rings: The Two Towers	Peter Jackson	Shot back-to-back
2003	The Lord of the Rings: The Return of the King	Peter Jackson	Shot back-to-back
2004	Love's Brother	Jan Sardi	
2005	King Kong	Peter Jackson	
2007	I Am Legend	Francis Lawrence	
2009	Bran Nue Dae	Rachel Perkins	
2009	The Lovely Bones	Peter Jackson	
2010	The Last Airbender	M. Night Shyamalan	
2011	Rise of the Planet of the Apes	Rupert Wyatt	
2012	The Hobbit: An Unexpected Journey	Peter Jackson	
2013	The Hobbit: The Desolation of Smaug	Peter Jackson	
2014	Healing	Craig Monahan	
2014	The Hobbit: The Battle of the Five Armies	Peter Jackson	
2014	The Water Diviner	Russell Crowe	

=== Television ===
Year	Title	Director	Notes
1979–1986	Wonder World!		497 episodes
1986	Cyclone Tracy	Donald Crombie; Kathy Mueller	Miniseries
1988	Melba	Rodney Fisher	6 episodes
1988	The Rainbow Warrior Conspiracy	Chris Thomson	Miniseries
1990	Winners	George Whaley	Episode "Mr Edmund"
1994–1995	House of Fun	Rebel Penfold-Russell	

TV movies

Year	Title	Director	Notes
1980	Stages: Peter Brook and the C.I.C.T in Australia	Robert Mellor	Documentary film
1989	The Saint: Fear in Fun Park	Donald Crombie	
1989	How Wonderful!	Lynn Hergarty	

== Awards and nominations ==
Year	Title	Award/Nomination
1993	Temptation of a Monk	Nominated- Hong Kong Film Award for Best Cinematography
1997	Doing Time for Patsy Cline	AACTA Award for Best Cinematography
2001	The Lord of the Rings: The Fellowship of the Ring	Academy Award for Best Cinematography; Chicago Film Critics Association Award for Best Cinematography; Dallas–Fort Worth Film Critics Association Award for Best Cinematography; Nominated- BAFTA Award for Best Cinematography; Nominated- ASC Award for Outstanding Cinematography; Nominated- Online Film Critics Society Award for Best Cinematography; Nominated- Satellite Award for Best Cinematography
2002	The Lord of the Rings: The Two Towers	Nominated- BAFTA Award for Best Cinematography; Nominated- Chicago Film Critics Association Award for Best Cinematography; Nominated- Online Film Critics Society Award for Best Cinematography; Nominated- Satellite Award for Best Cinematography
2003	The Lord of the Rings: The Return of the King	BAFTA Award for Best Cinematography; Dallas–Fort Worth Film Critics Association Award for Best Cinematography; Florida Film Critics Circle Award for Best Cinematography; Online Film Critics Society Award for Best Cinematography; Nominated- ASC Award for Outstanding Cinematography; Nominated- Chicago Film Critics Association Award for Best Cinematography; Nominated- Satellite Award for Best Cinematography
2004	Love's Brother	Nominated- AACTA Award for Best Cinematography
2005	King Kong	Nominated- ASC Award for Outstanding Cinematography; Nominated- Chicago Film Critics Association Award for Best Cinematography
2009	The Lovely Bones	Dallas–Fort Worth Film Critics Association Award for Best Cinematography; Nominated- Critics' Choice Movie Award for Best Cinematography; Nominated- Houston Film Critics Society Award for Best Cinematography
