= Lee Perry (voice actor) =

Australian voice over actor (born 1959)

- Born: 16 December 1959 (age 66); Australia
- Occupation: Voice actor
- Years active: 1991–present

Lee Perry (born 16 December 1959 in Australia) is an Australian voice actor known for portraying various characters in either direct-to-video or theatrically released animated movies such as $9.99 (2008), Happy Feet (2006), and Happy Feet Two (2011). He has also appeared in live action in Furiosa: A Mad Max Saga (2024).

== Career ==
Perry's television voice overs include characters and narrations in Men in Black: The Series, Always Greener, Farscape: The Peacekeeper Wars and Sisters of War.

Perry has voiced over many commercials, IVRs, radio/TV promos, ad campaigns and tour programs.

In 1997, Perry provided the narration for Baz Luhrmann's version of the song "Everybody's Free (To Wear Sunscreen)".

== Personal life ==
Perry currently lives in Sydney, Australia. His brother, Alex, is a fashion designer.

== Filmography ==
=== Film ===
Year	Title	Role	Notes
1991	White Fang	Voice	
1991	The Emperor's New Clothes	Voice	
1991	Hans and the Silver Skates	Voice	
1991	Goldilocks and the Three Bears	Voice	
1991	Frank Einstein	Voice	
1992	The New Adventures of Robin Hood	Voice	
1992	The New Adventures of William Tell	Voice	
1992	The Pied Piper of Hamlin	Voice	
1993	The Fantastic Voyages of Sinbad	Voice	
1993	Thumbelina	Voice	
1993	Puss in Boots	Voice	
1993	Ali Baba	Voice	
1994	Hans and the Silver Skates	Voice	
1995	Pocahantas	Captain John Smith (voice)	
1996	Cinderella	Voice	
1996	The Hunchback of Notre Dame	Voice	
1997	Hercules	Voice	
1997	Anastasia	Voice	
1998	The Little Mermaid	Voice	
1998	Camelot	Voice	
1998	Mulan	Voice	
1999	The Three Little Pigs	Voice	
2000	The Magic Pudding	Additional voices	
2000	Anna and the King	Voice	
2002	Tragic Love		Short film
2004	The Money	Eddie MacGuire / Terry	Short film
2005	Jewboy	Tennis Commentary (voice)	
2005	Three Dollars	TV voice	
2006	Happy Feet	Elder / Zoo Penguin (voice)	
2008	$9.99	Coffee Shop Clerk / Computer Game Voice / Soccer Announcer	
2009	The Water	The Trailer Voice	Short film
2011	Happy Feet Two	Wayne the Challenger / Francesco / Eggbert / Leopard Seal (voice)	
2015	Mad Max: Fury Road	The Many Voices (voice)	
2024	Furiosa: A Mad Max Saga	The Bullet Farmer	

=== Television ===
Year	Title	Role	Notes
1991	The Count of Monte-Cristo	Voice	TV film
1991–1992	Dinky Di's	Various voices	
1997	The Adventures of Sam	Voice	Episode: "Moon Daughter"
2000	Men in Black: The Series	Voice	Episode: "The J Is for James Syndrome"
2001, 2002	Always Greener	Voiceover Man / Nature Documentary Narrator	Episodes: "The Mating Urge" and "What's in a Name?"
2004	Farscape: The Peacekeeper Wars	Bishan (voice)	TV miniseries
2010	Sisters of War	Newsreel Narrator	TV film
2011	Underbelly Files: Tell Them Lucifer was Here	Police radio / Interviewer	TV film
2014	Soul Mates	God Poo	Episode: "Above and Beyond"
2018	Sando	Sando's Warehouse Commercial	5 episodes
2023	Utopia	Voice Over (voice)	Episode: "Lights, Camera, Inaction"

=== Video games ===
Year	Title	Role	Notes
2000	Deus Ex	Dr. Bernard / Disgruntled Guy / Doctor / Scared Soldier	
2000	Nox	Mayor Theogrin / Guard 2 / Rogue / Townsman 1 / Barkeeper	
