= Gennie Nevinson =

Australian actress (born 1951)

- Born: Rima J. C. Hoyes-Cock; 1951 (age 74–75); London, England
- Education: Sir George Williams University, Montreal, Quebec, Canada
- Occupation: Actress
- Known for: Muriel's Wedding; Minder
- Spouse(s): Peter Engebretsen (1981 – his death); Viv Manwaring
- Children: 1
- Family: Nancy Nevinson (mother)

Gennie Nevinson (born 1951) is a British-Australian actress. She is notable for her appearance in Muriel's Wedding.

== Early life ==
Born Rima J. C. Hoyes-Cock in London in 1951, Gennie Nevinson is the daughter of the late Jewish actress Nancy Nevinson (née Ezekiel). Nevinson's father Commander William Hoyes-Cock met her mother while Nancy was touring with the Entertainments National Service Association (ENSA) during World War 2. Her parents also had two sons, Hugh Hoyes-Cock and actor Nigel Nevinson.

Nevinson studied drama and stage design at Sir George Williams University in Montreal, Canada.

== Career ==
Nevinson's acting career began as a child, with a part in the Disney classic Greyfriars Bobby (1961).

She went on to feature in several British television series, including the first two seasons of Minder (playing Penny, the air hostess girlfriend of Terry). Guest appearances included The Professionals and The Bill and Sutherland's Law. She also worked on stage in the UK, and toured Germany with a production of Hair.

Nevinson moved to Australia in 1981, where she continued to work successfully as an actress. She played the regular supporting role of Peta Hamilton in the children's series Zoo Family, as well as recurring roles in Sons and Daughters, Home and Away, E Street, All Saints, and most recently, The Twelve. She has also made numerous guest appearances in series including Prisoner, G.P., Police Rescue, Murder Call, Wildside, Water Rats and Packed to the Rafters and Colin from Accounts.

She notably appeared as Deidre Chambers ('the other woman') in the 1994 Australian hit film Muriel's Wedding.

Nevinson has also undertaken a vast array of voice work, both locally and internationally. She voiced characters for the English-spoken version of Japanese cult series Monkey and narrated BBC television series Panorama. She post-synched female leads in cult classic Caligula (1979), Stanley Kubrick horror The Shining (1980) and James Bond film For Your Eyes Only (1981). In Australia she voiced characters in animated television series Dinky Di's (1997–98), and a number of animated tv films by Burbank Films, which were based on literary classics. She was also the voice one of the sheep in Australian film Babe (1995). She has narrated several radio documentary projects and featured in radio and tv advertisements for brands including Aldi, CommBank, and Betta Electrical.

== Personal life ==
Nevinson relocated from the UK to Australia in 1981, after meeting her first husband Peter while on holiday there. A hiatus from acting eventually saw Nevinson and her husband move to the Central Coast of New South Wales with their son Joss, and develop 'Amazement Farm & Fun Park' in the Yarramalong Valley, a family tourist attraction which boasted mazes, puzzles and animals. She sold the establishment however, after the sudden death of Peter. She eventually met and married her second husband, Viv Manwaring, through whom she has three stepsons and ten step-grandchildren, and still lives on the central NSW coast.

Nevinson was born to a Jewish mother and is therefore considered Jewish according to Halakha (Jewish law). However, she is a practicing Christian and has long been a radio announcer for Rhema FM, a Christian radio station in Australia.

== Filmography ==
=== Television ===
| Year | Title | Role | Notes |
|---|---|---|---|
| 1963 | Walter and Connie | Gloria | Season 1, episode 23: "Connie in the Air" |
| 1972 | The Man Outside | Young Mother | Season 1, episode 10: "Bye, Bye, Mrs Bly" (credited as Jenny Nevison) |
| 1973 | Orson Welles' Great Mysteries | Suzanne | Season 1, episode 3: "A Terribly Strange Bed" |
| 1974 | South Riding | Bessy Warbuckle; Bessie Aythorne | Miniseries, 3 episodes (credited as Jenny Nevinson) |
| 1975 | Sutherland's Law | Maria Angelotti | Season 4, episode 5: "The Italian Debt" |
| 1979 | Murder at the Wedding | Paddy | Miniseries, 3 episodes |
| 1980 | The Professionals | Eva | Season 4, episode 1: "The Acorn Syndrome" |
| 1980 | Minder | Penny | Seasons 1 & 2, 4 episodes |
| 1981 | Agony | Alison | Season 3, episode 1: "From Here to Maternity" |
| 1984 | Sons and Daughters | Tanya Ross | Season 1, 3 episodes |
| 1984 | Special Squad | Kate | Season 1, episode 32: "Until Death" |
| 1985 | Zoo Family | Peta Hamilton | Season 1, 26 episodes |
| 1986 | Space Baby | FX, FM (voice) | Pilot episode only |
| 1987 | Star Cops | Lee Jones | Season 1, 2 episodes: "An Instinct for Murder", "Conversations With the Dead" |
| 1989 | E Street | Lara McCoy | Season 1, 6 episodes |
| 1989 | Home and Away | Joan | Season 1, episode 339 |
| 1990 | The Paper Man | Alice Drummond | Miniseries, 2 episodes |
| 1991 | Home and Away | Margaret Lynch | 18 episodes |
| 1991 | The Bill | Janice Deacon | Season 7, episode 73: "Inside Job" |
| 1991 | G.P. | Grace Budd | Season 3, episode 35: "Collateral Damage" |
| 1991 | Dinky Di's | Cass Koala, Equulus Emu, Cauda Kiwi, Orikawa Bear's Son, Beatrice, Hydra Hen, Pleiades Panda & additional voices | Animated series |
| 1993 | Police Rescue | Alice Mortimer | Season 3, episode 12: "Double Illusion" |
| 1995 | Space: Above and Beyond | Anne West | Double length pilot episode |
| 1996 | House Gang | Chris | Season 1, episode 6: "Sex" |
| 1997 | Big Sky | Mrs Webster | Season 1, episode 5: "Growing Pains" |
| 1997–1998 | Children's Hospital | Pam | 13 episodes, lead role |
| 1998 | Wildside | Beth Atkins | Season 1, episode 8 |
| 1998 | Murder Call | Vivian Goldman | Season 2, episode 7: "Murder in Reverse" |
| 1998–2000 | All Saints | Mrs Levine | Seasons 1–3, 6 episodes (mother of Jared Levine) |
| 1999 | Water Rats | Lorna Murdoch | Season 4, episode 24: "Force of Habit" |
| 2001 | Stingers | Susan Corrigan | Season 4, episode 22: "Do the Right Thing" |
| 2002 | Bad Cop, Bad Cop | Coroner | Season 1, episode 3: "The Loaded Dog" |
| 2002 | Home and Away | Patricia Morgan | 5 episodes |
| 2004 | All Saints | Fiona Thorne | Season 7, episode 31 |
| 2008–2009 | Packed to the Rafters | Helen | Season 1, 2 episodes |
| 2014 | Town Centre | Sue | TV special |
| 2015 | How Not to Behave | Ensemble cast | Season 1, 3 episodes: "Births, Deaths and Weddings" |
| 2020 | Between Two Worlds | Sandra's mother | Season 1, 3 episodes |
| 2022 | The Twelve | Margaret Brown | Miniseries, 10 episodes |
| 2024 | Colin from Accounts | Monica | Season 2, episode 2: "Bacon in the Drawer" |

=== Film ===
| Year | Title | Role | Notes |
|---|---|---|---|
| 1960 | Identity Unknown | Millda | (credited as Jennifer Nevinson) |
| 1961 | Greyfriars Bobby: The True Story of a Dog | Farmer's daughter (uncredited) | Feature film |
| 1970 | Groupie Girl | Moira | Feature film (credited as Jennifer Nevinson) |
| 1974 | Hard Day | | Feature film (credited as Jennifer Nevinson) |
| 1976 | I'm Not Feeling Myself Tonight | Vera | Feature film |
| 1976 | The Twelve Tasks of Asterix | Additional voices | Animated film (English version voice dub) |
| 1976 | Take an Easy Ride | Pam | Short film (credited as Jenny Nevinson) |
| 1976 | The Deadly Females | Vicki | Feature film (credited as Gennie Nevison) |
| 1984 | Silver City | Woman Veteran | Feature film |
| 1986 | Death of a Soldier | Gladys Hosking | Feature film |
| 1986 | Jenny Kissed Me | Drug Cop 3 | Feature film |
| 1991 | Ali Baba | Various (voice) | Animated TV movie |
| 1992 | The New Adventures of Robin Hood | Various (voice) | Animated TV movie |
| 1992 | The Pied Piper of Hamlin | Various (voice) | Animated TV movie |
| 1993 | Fatal Past | Helen Moore | Feature film |
| 1993 | Muriel's Wedding | Deidre Chambers | Feature film |
| 1993 | Thumbelina | Voice | Animated film |
| 1995 | Babe | Sheep (voice) | Feature film (credited as Genni Nevinson) |
| 1995 | Tunnel Vision | Club Owner | Feature film |
| 1996 | The Hunchback of Notre Dame | Various (voice) | Animated film |
| 1999 | Strange Planet | Therapist | Feature film |
| 2004 | Love in the First Degree | Elizabeth Barrett | |

=== Commercials ===
| Year | Campaign | Role | Ref |
|---|---|---|---|
| 1989 | Shower Electric | Shower Singer 2 | |
| | Dishlex | | |
| | Aldi | | |
| | CommBank | | |
| | Betta Electrical | | |
| | Honda | | |
| | Schmackos | | |

== Theatre ==
| Year | Title | Role | Notes |
|---|---|---|---|
| 1968 | Pink String and Sealing Wax | Jesse Strachan | Theatre Royal, Bath, UK (credited as Jenny Nevinson) |
| 1968 | The Reluctant Debutante | Mrs Edgar | Theatre Royal, Bath, UK (credited as Jenny Nevinson) |
| 1969 | The Boy Friend | | UK tour (credited as Jenny Nevinson) |
| | Hair | | German tour |
| 2024 | Sage to Stage | Play reading | Sydney Philharmonic Choirs Hall, Walsh Bay Arts Precinct, Sydney |
