= McKimmie =

Surname list

McKimmie is a surname. Notable people with the surname include:

- Jackie McKimmie (born 1950), Australian writer and director
- Stewart McKimmie (born 1962), Scottish footballer
