= Takeover (1988 film) =

- Written by: Peter Moon
- Directed by: Robert Marchand
- Starring: Barry Otto; Anne Tenney; Paul Chubb
- Country of origin: Australia
- Original language: English

Production
- Producer: Phillip Emanuel

Original release
- Release: 1988

Takeover is a 1988 Australian film directed by Robert Marchand and starring Barry Otto, Anne Tenney, and Paul Chubb. The film is about George Oppenheimer, a computer inventor.

== Cast ==
- Barry Otto as George Oppenheimer
- Anne Tenney as Hilda Oppenheimer
- Paul Chubb as Frank
- Mark Hennessy as Alan
- Bruce Kerr as Doctor
- Kate Hood as Nurse
- Sean Scully as Enzo
