= Bathing Franky =

- Directed by: Owen Elliott
- Written by: Michael Winchester
- Produced by: Owen Elliott, Michael Winchester
- Starring: Jancita Day, Bree Desborough, Shaun Goss
- Cinematography: Gavin Banks
- Production companies: 76 Pictures, Purple Top Productions
- Release date: 26 May 2012

Bathing Franky is a 2012 Australian film directed by Owen Elliott. The movie was released on 26 May 2012 and centers on a young man struggling to reconnect with his life after being released from prison.

== Synopsis ==
Ex-con Steve is unable to entirely cope with his recent release from prison. He's not able to hold a successful relationship with his girlfriend Suzie due to his past interactions with another man, "Raven", in prison. Steve has been recruited into delivering "Mobile Canteen" (fictional version of Meals on Wheels) food packages to various people. Through this job he becomes acquainted with Rodney, a "backyard magician" who for forty years has cared for his invalid mother Francisca "Franky", telling stories of her days as a renowned cabaret performer. Rodney agrees to Steve living at their house. A friendship develops and intensifies; Franky disapproves.

Peg, the manager of Mobile Canteen, tells Steve the true story of Franky's arrival in Australia from Italy, pregnant and alone, how she contracted polio and was incapacitated by stroke. She may have been a small-time entertainer says Peg, but never the star Rodney makes out. Peg agrees to help Suzie with her personal problems if Steve will persuade Rodney to put Franky in a nursing home. Steve confesses to Rodney how four years earlier, as a drug courier, he accidentally crushed his friend's head while fleeing a hostile gang, and left him to die.

He takes a knife and hitch-hikes into Sydney, intending to confront Raven, and discovers the prison bully is just another human trying to get by. By the time Steve returns Franky is dead. She went peacefully, Rodney says.

== Cast ==
- Henri Szeps as Rodney
- Maria Venuti as Franky
- Shaun Goss as Steve
- Bree Desborough as Susie
- Kath Leahy as Peg
- Brendan Madigan as Tommy
- Michael Winchester as Raven
- Alexander Spinks as Bindi
- Letitia Sutherland as Donna
- Ben Tranter as Young Vincenzo
- Jancita Day as Young Franky

== Production ==
Michael Winchester began writing the script over a ten-year period while working as a cattle farmer. Diarmid Heidenreich was initially cast as Steve, but the role later went to Shaun Goss for unspecified reasons. Filming took place in 2009, over a four-week period in New South Wales’ Hunter Valley.

== Reception ==
Reviewers for Urban Cinefile gave positive reviews for Bathing Franky, both praising Venuti's acting.
