= Nicholas Bufalo =

Australian actor and director

- Born: 1961/1962 (aged 63-65); Melbourne, Australia
- Occupations: Actor, director
- Years active: 1984–present

Nicholas Bufalo (born 1961 or 1962) is an Australian actor and director, perhaps best known for his role as Dr. Ben Green in A Country Practice and for directing a number of episodes for the soap opera Neighbours. He starred in the short-lived sitcom Bingles and the 1993 feature film Gino. He is also a founding member of The D-Generation. His directing work includes episodes of Home and Away, City Homicide, and Packed to the Rafters. In 2008, Bufalo received an Australian Directors' Guild Award nomination.

== Early life ==
Before his acting career began, Bufalo lived with his retired parents, his elder brother and younger sister in Melbourne. After leaving school, Bufalo gained a Bachelor of Arts degree at the University of Melbourne, and planned to get his Diploma of Education. He originally intended to become a teacher and had not considered an acting career, until he took a year long drama course and became a cast member and writer for a university revue group called Let's Talk Backwards.

== Career ==
Bufalo's first major television role was veterinarian Dr. Ben Green in A Country Practice, which he played from 1985 until 1988. Bufalo was introduced to the series alongside Annie Davies as Kelly Shanahan. Stephen Cook of TV Week reported that they beat out more than 500 other actors for the roles. Bufalo's character was intended as a replacement for fellow vet Vicky Bowen, played by Penny Cook. Bufalo relocated from Melbourne to Sydney for filming. During his time on A Country Practice, Bufalo also worked as a dialogue coach. Bufalo left A Country Practice after contract negotiations with the production company broke down. Seven Network wanted him to stay on until the new nurse played by Brett Climo won audience approval, however, he left as originally planned by producers.

Bufalo was a founding member of the sketch comedy show The D-Generation. He signed a music publishing contract with MCA Records in mid-1986, with his debut recording being the theme from The D-Generation. Bufalo is the lead vocalist on the track, which he also wrote. When the series was due to be re-broadcast, Bufalo recorded a new song for the single's B-side. From 1992 until 1993, he starred in the sitcom Bingles as "would-be Italian Stallion" mechanic Tony. He also starred as the titular character in the 1993 feature film Gino opposite Zoe Carides.

In addition to his screen roles, Bufalo also appeared in various theatre productions. He toured with Australian play Wogs Out of Work. In 1991, he starred in Neil Simon's The Good Doctor, which is based on eight Anton Chekhov short stories. The following year, he appeared in 3 Men Naked from the Waist Down alongside Rhys Muldoon and Marty Fields at the Universal Theatre in Melbourne. He also appeared in Steve Martin's Picasso at the Lapin Agile which was staged at the Belvoir street theatre. Director Neil Armfield later asked Bufalo to become a rehearsal director for the production.

In 1995, Bufalo directed Rio Would Be Nice, a play written and starring Cliff Ellen. In 1996, after completing the Grundy's director training course, Bufalo was hired as a director on the soap opera Neighbours. The serial's producer Peter Dodds commented "Nick's experience with actors made him the right choice. We wanted a trainee director who was performance-orientated rather than a technical director." In 2002, Bufalo directed the seven-part comedy series Flipside. He has gone on to direct a number of Australian television shows, including Home and Away, All Saints, McLeod's Daughters, City Homicide, Winners & Losers, and Packed to the Rafters.

In 2008, Bufalo received a nomination for Best Direction in a TV Drama Series at the Australian Directors' Guild Awards for All Saints episode "Caught In A Trap". In 2024, his series I Challenge You was a finalist for the AACTA Reg Grundy Award, which awards $50,000 for the best original idea for Australia's next unscripted television show.
