= Brian Bansgrove =

New Zealand film producer (1941–2001)

- Born: 18 July 1941; Christchurch, New Zealand
- Died: 29 December 2001 (age 60); Thailand
- Occupation: Gaffer

Brian Bansgrove (18 July 1941 – 29 December 2001) was a New Zealand gaffer (chief lighting technician for motion pictures) best known for his work on The Lord of the Rings film trilogy.

Andrew Lesnie, who won the 2002 Academy Award for Cinematography for The Lord of the Rings: The Fellowship of the Ring said that Bansgrove and his crew were the "key element" in helping him craft images for the three Lord of the Rings films during the 15-month shoot between mid-1999 and late 2000. At the nomination of the film for the 16th annual ASC awards (American Society of Cinematographers), Lesnie called him "one of the true legends of the Australian film industry" saying further that "he was an extremely close collaborator" in the lighting design. Lesnie described Bansgrove not only as a friend and colleague but as the "main reason for winning" the Academy Award. Lesnie dedicated his Academy Award to Bansgrove in his acceptance speech at the 74th Academy Awards Ceremony.

== Filmography ==
=== Camera and electrical department ===
- Avatar (2004): Gaffer
- The Lord of the Rings: The Return of the King (2003) Gaffer (supervising chief lighting technician)
- The Lord of the Rings: The Two Towers (2002) Gaffer (supervising chief lighting technician)
- The Lord of the Rings: The Fellowship of the Ring (2001) Gaffer (supervising chief lighting technician)
- A Bright Shining Lie (1998) Gaffer
- Welcome to Woop Woop (1997): Gaffer
- The Phantom (1996) Gaffer (uncredited)
- Operation Dumbo Drop (1995): Gaffer
- No Escape (1994): Gaffer
- Sniper (1993): Gaffer
- Turtle Beach (1992): Gaffer
- Sweet Talker (1991): Gaffer
- Almost an Angel (1990): Gaffer
- Prisoners of the Sun (1990): Gaffer
- Crocodile Dundee II (1988): Gaffer
- High Tide (1987): Gaffer
- The Perfectionist (1987): Gaffer
- Crocodile Dundee (1986): Gaffer
- Burk & Wills (1985): Gaffer
- Phar Lap (1983): Gaffer
- The Return of Captain Invincible (1983): Gaffer
- Stanley (1983): Gaffer
- The Year of Living Dangerously (1982): Gaffer
- Starstruck (1982): Gaffer
- Heatwave (1982): Gaffer
- Gallipoli (1981): Gaffer
- The Chain Reaction (1980): Gaffer
- Stir (1980): Gaffer
- The Girl who met Simone de Beauvoir in Paris (1980): Gaffer
- My Brilliant Career (1979): Gaffer
- Alison's Birthday (1979): Gaffer
- Cathy's Child (1979): Gaffer
- In Search of Anna (1978): Gaffer
- Newsfront (1978): Gaffer
- Journey among Woman (1977): Gaffer
- The Love Letters from Teralba Road (1977): Gaffer
- The F.J Holden (1977): Gaffer
- Break of Day (1976): Gaffer
- Mad Dog Morgan (1976): Gaffer
- The Trespassers (1976): Gaffer
- The Removalists (1975): Gaffer
- The Great McCarthy (1975): Gaffer
- The Man from Hong Kong (1975): Gaffer
- Promised Woman (1975): Gaffer
- Stone (1974): Gaffer
- 27A (1974): Gaffer
- The Office Picnic (1973): Gaffer

=== Cinematographer ===
- Now and Then (1979)
- And / Or = One (1978)

=== Miscellaneous ===
- The Lord of the Rings: The Return of the King (2003): Dedicatee
- The Long and Short of It (2003): In loving memory
- Welcome to Woop Woop (1997): Cruise Director
