= Bingles =

- Genre: Sitcom
- Created by: Ian McFadyen
- Starring: Shane Bourne; Nicholas Bufalo; Tammy MacIntosh; Cliff Ellen; Dalibor Satalic; Tim Scally; Sally-Anne Upton; Andrew Maj; Russell Gilbert
- Country of origin: Australia
- Original language: English
- No. of episodes: 23

Production
- Executive producer: Ian McFadyen
- Producers: Joanne Mulvany; Ian McFadyen
- Running time: 25 minutes
- Production companies: Network Ten; Media Arts Corporation Pty Ltd

Original release
- Network: Network Ten
- Release: 5 December 1992 – 13 June 1993

Bingles is an Australian sitcom which screened on Network 10 from 5 December 1992 until 13 June 1993. It is set in a suburban smash repair workshop called Bingles owned by Ron Bignell (Cliff Ellen).

== Production ==
The sitcom was conceived by Ian McFadyen in 1989 and intended to be a vehicle for the male cast members of The Comedy Company. Network 10 brought the show and it went into production in August 1991. Filming on 23 episodes was completed in August 1992. McFadyen said most of the episodes centre on Ron Bignell's attempts to get his staff to work.

Bingles is a play on the word bingle, which is Australian slang for a minor crash or upset. Network Ten commissioned a second series of 13 episodes before the first series had gone to air, however the series was not very successful. Bingles aired during the Summer non-ratings period in a Saturday 8 p.m. timeslot. Raymond Gill of The Age said the scheduling "does not inspire confidence in the program."

== Cast ==
- Shane Bourne as Barry
- Nicholas Bufalo as Tony
- Tammy MacIntosh as Stacy Bignell
- Cliff Ellen as Ron Bignell
- Dalibor Satalic as Oscar
- Tim Scally as Clive
- Sally-Anne Upton as Dierdre
- Andrew Maj as Lester
- Russell Gilbert as Kev

== Episodes ==
No.	Title	Original release date
1	"The Clean-Up"	5 December 1992
2	"Battle of the Sexes"	12 December 1992
3	"Arachnophobia"	19 December 1992
4	"All Through the Night"	26 December 1992
5	"For Want of a Nail"	2 January 1993
6	"Bringing Up Baby"	9 January 1993
7	"Nature Calling"	16 January 1993
8	"The Pop Star"	22 January 1993
9	"The Candidate"	22 January 1993
10	"The Horse's Mouth"	29 January 1993
11	"The Painting"	29 January 1993
12	"The Boyfriend"	5 February 1993
13	"The Godfather"	5 February 1993
14	"Work Experience"	21 March 1993
15	"Lester's Big Romance, Part 1"	4 April 1993
16	"Lester's Big Romance, Part 2"	25 April 1993
17	"One of the Boys"	2 May 1993
18	"The New Man"	9 May 1993
19	"The New Manager"	16 May 1993
20	"Motivation"	23 May 1993
21	"The Odd Single"	31 May 1993
22	"The TV Ad"	6 June 1993
23	"The Holidays"	13 June 1993

== Reception ==
Robert Fidgeon of the Herald Sun named Bingles as one of "Australia's All-time Top 50 TV Turkeys". He stated "Unfunny sitcom set in a mechanic's garage, with Shane Bourne, Russell Gilbert, Nick Bufalo and Tammy Macintosh. Thirteen episodes made, a further 13 were ordered before the first 13 were screened and died."
