= Gino (film) =

- Directed by: Jackie McKimmie
- Written by: Vince Sorrenti; Larry Buttrose; Max Dann
- Produced by: Ross Matthews
- Starring: Nicholas Bufalo; Zoe Carides; Bruno Lawrence; Maria Venuti
- Cinematography: Ellery Ryan
- Edited by: Emma Hay
- Music by: Roger Mason
- Production company: Filmside Productions
- Release date: 1994
- Running time: 94 minutes
- Country: Australia
- Language: English
- Budget: $2.5 million

Gino is a 1993 Australian film, directed by Jackie McKimmie.

== Plot ==
Gino Pallazetti is in love with Lucia Petri and his career as a stand-up comedian is about to take off.

== Cast ==
- Nicholas Bufalo
- Zoe Carides as Lucia Petri
- Bruno Lawrence as Mr Palizetti
- Maria Venuti as Angelina

== Production ==
The film was financed by the Australian Film Commission and Film Finance Corporation. The film was never released theatrically. It was shot from 5 April to 16 May 1993. This was New Zealand actor Bruno Lawrence's final film appearance; ill health forced him to bow out of a further motion picture, Cosi, with his part unfinished.
