= Maria Venuti =

Australian actress, entertainer and author (born 1941)

Maria Venuti AM
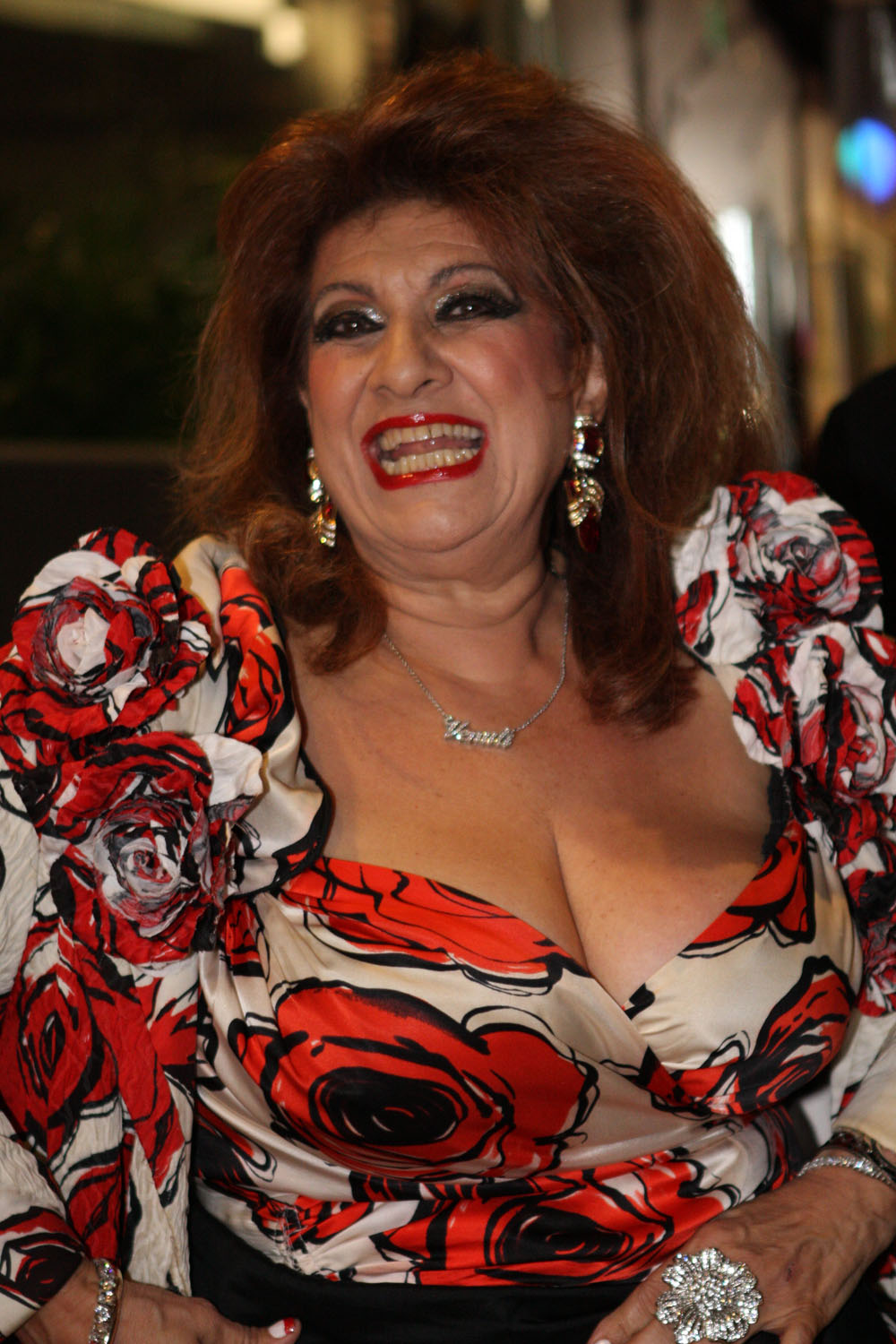
- Venuti in 2012
- Born: Maria Francesia Anna Venuti; 7 March 1941 (age 85); Sydney, New South Wales, Australia
- Occupations: Actress; singer; pianist; author
- Years active: 1978–current
- Known for: Fat Pizza
- Spouse: Tony Hughes (divorced)
- Children: 1

Maria Francesia Anna Venuti AM (born 7 March 1941) is an Australian actress, entertainer and author, who has appeared in numerous stage, television shows and film productions, over 50 years.

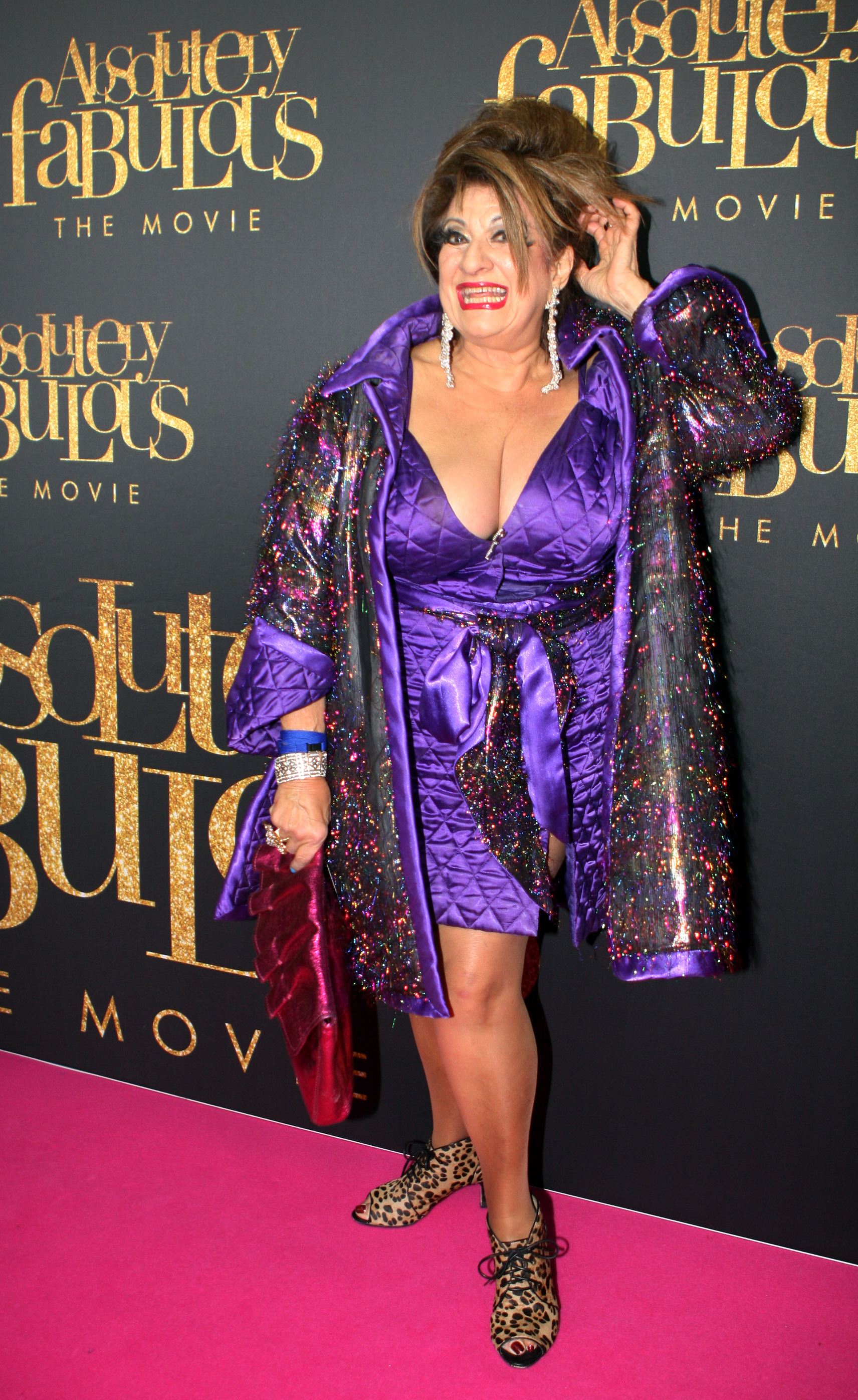

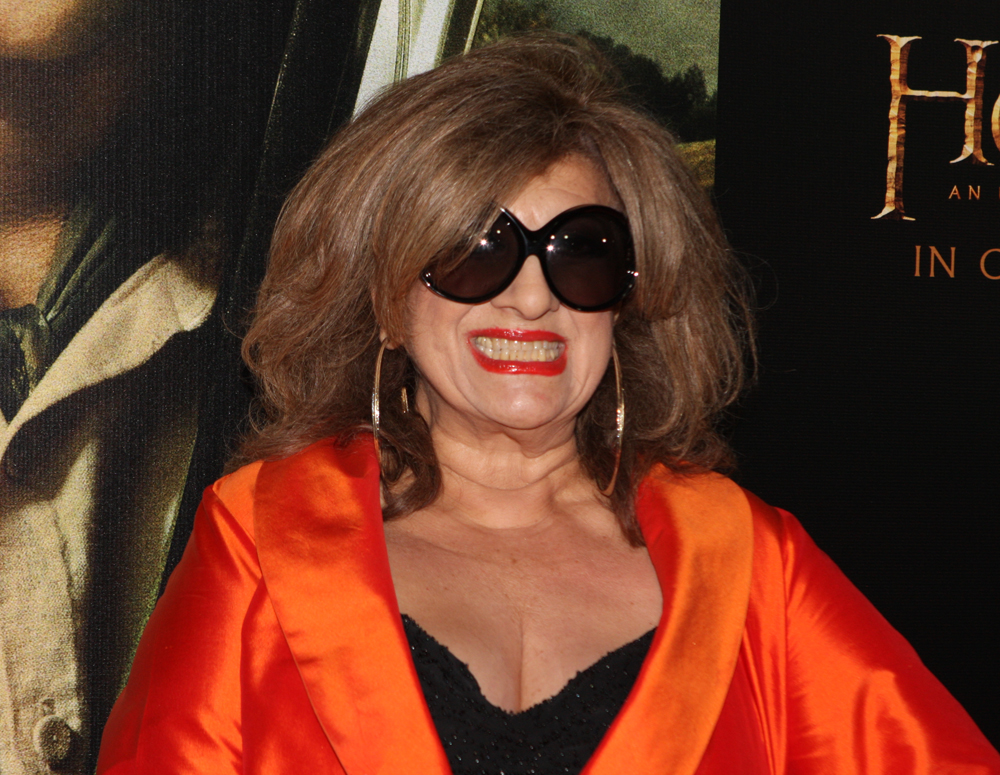

Venuti is a singer, as well as an accomplished pianist who is noted for her work in cabaret and supper clubs, including working throughout Asia.

== Biography ==
Venuti's father was from Sicily, and came to Australia in 1926 and her mother, Bella who was 18 years younger than her father, was from Cairo, Egypt and came to Sydney in 1939. She has a daughter named Bianca by her previous husband, Tony; they are now divorced. She has a half sister, Gina and had a half brother Francesco, who died of Diphtheria. Venuti has written a memoir, called A Whole Lot of Front.

Her early life was unsettled and when she was in kindergarten, she moved schools four times because of bullying due to her descent.

=== Stalking and intruder incident ===
In November 2016, Venuti was hospitalized after suffering a stroke, and was subsequently placed in a coma after the stress of an intruder entering her home in Gladesville, New South Wales. The police had been called three times previously, after the 38-year-old man was seen lingering outside her home and stalking Venuti, turning up with flowers and alleging he was married to her. The man was taken under escort to the Royal North Shore Hospital, for a mental evaluation.

== Filmography ==
=== Film ===
Year	Title	Role	Type
1987	Les Patterson Saves the World	Air Hostess (uncredited)	Feature film
1994	Gino	Angelina	Feature film
1996	Fistful of Flies	Magda	Feature film
2002	Score!	The Mother	
2003	Fat Pizza	Mama Gigliotti	Feature film
2011	Big Mamma's Boy	Mrs. Cotoletta	
2012	Bathing Franky	Franky	Feature film
2014	Fat Pizza vs. Housos	Mama Gigliotti	Feature film

=== Television ===
Year	Title	Role	Type
1982	Cabaret	Regular singer	TV series
1990	A Country Practice	Liz Scales	TV series, 1 episode
1993	G.P.	Bella Tucci	TV series, 1 episode
2000–2007	Fat Pizza	Mama Gigliotti	TV series, 19 episodes
2002; 2003	Always Greener	Lorraine	TV series, 2 episodes
2008	Stupid Stupid Man	Margaret	TV series, 1 episode
2011	Swift and Shift Couriers	Maria Shembry	TV series, 2 episodes
2019–2021	Fat Pizza: Back in Business	Mama Gigliotti	TV series, 11 episodes

== Stage ==
Year	Title	Role	Venue / Company
1985	Women Behind Bars		University of Sydney
1990–1991	Lend Me a Tenor	Maria	His Majesty's Theatre, Perth, Theatre Royal Sydney, Lyric Theatre, Brisbane, Canberra Theatre
1995	Maria Venuti	Solo show	Queanbeyan School of Arts Cafe
1998	Valentines Day		Marian Street Theatre, Sydney with Northside Theatre Company
2000	Mama Claus is Coming to Town	Solo show	Capers Cabaret, Melbourne
2008	Light the Night		City Recital Hall, Sydney
2008	An All-Star Tribute to Peter Allen		Star Theatre, Sydney

== Bibliography ==
- Whole Load of Front (2011)

== Awards ==
Year	Award	Category	Result
2000	Mo Awards	John Campbell Fellowship Award	Won
