= Dinky Di's =

Australian animated TV series

- Also known as: The Dinky-Di's: Friends on Freedom's Frontier
- Genre: Action-adventure; Edutainment
- Created by: Melvyn Edward Bradford
- Written by: Melvyn Edward Bradford; Neil Booth; Terry Burstall; Leonard Lee; Peter Merrill; Wayne Moore; Mike Heffernan; Willie Mombassa
- Voices of: Gennie Nevinson; Ric Melbourne; Lee Perry; Grahame Matters; Tony Bellette
- Theme music composer: Matthew Sloggett
- Opening theme: "Friends on Freedom's Frontier" performed by Melvyn Edward Bradford and Bob LaCastra
- Composers: Pat Aulton; Garry McDonald; Laurie Stone
- Country of origin: Australia
- Original language: English
- No. of series: 1
- No. of episodes: 26

Production
- Executive producer: Hugh Cornish
- Producer: Melvyn Edward Bradford
- Editors: Carlos Alperin; Bob Bladsall
- Running time: 26 minutes
- Production companies: Pacific Rim Animation; Motion Picture Management Studios Australia

Original release
- Network: Nine Network
- Release: 6 December 1997 – 29 May 1998

Dinky-Di's, formally known as The Dinky-Di's: Friends on Freedom's Frontier, is an Australian animated television series that aired on the Nine Network Australia from 6 December 1997 to 29 May 1998. It was created by Melvyn Edward Bradford, produced by Roo Films Brisbane and animated by Pacific Rim Animation. The show taught children about the dangers of having carelessness for the planet and also for animals and plants that live on the earth. A common phrase from the theme song used by fans and the creator of the show was "We show no fear, we show no pain!"

== Premise ==
The Dinky Di's: Friends on Freedom's Frontier follows a group of anthropomorphic animals who go around the world saving rare and endangered animals and plants, while educating the audience on the importance of environmental preservation. Led by Aussie Roo (a Kangaroo) and Cass Koala (a Koala), this group consists of animals from all over the world who have many different specialties that serve to the Dinky-Di team, and are well organized with a command centre, computer network, and high-tech amphibious vehicles.

The group of rescuers fight against Mephisto, a shadowy eco-terrorist with glowing red eyes who uses a gang of maligned beasts to do his dirty work: Rancid Rodent (a Rat), Hugo Hyena (a Hyena), Ganny Goanna (an Iguana), Serpent Sam (a Dragon), and others. Mephisto's true identity, however, is a true mystery to the Dinky-Di's, and one which, when solved, will be a major step towards slowing damage to the planet.

== Voice cast ==
- Gennie Nevinson as Cass Koala, Equulus Emu, Cauda Kiwi, Orikawa Bear's Son, Beatrice, Hydra Hen, Pleiades Panda and additional voices
- Ric Melbourne as Aussie Roo, Chopa Crocodile, G.T. Garuda and additional voices
- Lee Perry as Ernest Eagle, Goat, Sidney Seal, Whales, Iceburglar #2, Animals, Narrator and additional voices
- Grahame Matters as Bill's Secretary and additional voices
- Tony Bellette as Plato Pus, Zennie, Mephisto, Rancid Rodent, Hugo Hyena, Ganny Goanna, Serpent Sam, Lazur Lion, Orikawa Bear, Bill Buffalo, Lazur's Boss, Mephisto's Henchman, Baron of Babel, Iceburglar #1, Doctor Hope, Archduke of Avaris, Guard Bear and additional voices

== Episodes ==
Out of the 26-episode series, only two full episodes in English have survived, "Baron of Babel" and "Funga Wunda", while the other only full episodes that are known, "Lost, One Dinky-Di", "The Compututor", "Duke of Deceit", "Sea Beneath the Sea, Beneath the Sea", "Yesterday, Today & Tomorrow", "Journey to Pedra Blanca", "Java Lava", "Tapir Caper" and "Mirage Master", are in Arabic, Brazilian Portuguese, Polish and Russian, respectively. However, half of the first episode and about seven minutes of "The Bilby Tale" also exist in English, and "Good Wood" partially exists in Russian. At some point on the Kooltube1 website (the website that Mel Bradford had), the episodes "The Bilby Tale", "Straits of Sorrow", "The Howling Crystal" and "Mirage Master" were available to watch. Though the Kooltube1 website is no longer around, there are a few archives still without any new content except images and copyright information.

The following episode list has mostly been translated from Polish, however, so it is known that these following episodes are the names for the English version of the show.

- "Lost, One Dinky-Di"
- "The Compututor"
- "The Bilby Tale"
- "Bat Chat"
- "Good Wood"
- "Duke of Deceit"
- "The Dolphin Dare"
- "The Crustaceans"
- "Baron of Babel"
- "Sea Beneath the Sea, Beneath the Sea"
- "Funga Wunda"
- "Yesterday, Today & Tomorrow"
- "Journey to Pedra Blanca"
- "Java Lava"
- "Straits of Sorrow"
- "The Howling Crystal"
- "Tapir Caper"
- "Mirage Master"
- "Small Hippo, Big Bust"

Episode list
Episode number#	Episode name	Written by	Original air date	Episode status
01	"Lost, One Dinky-Di"	Mel Bradford	6 December 1997	Found in Arabic, Brazilian Portuguese and Polish dubs/Partially Lost
02	"The Compututor"	Neil Booth	13 December 1997	Found in Brazilian Portuguese dub
03	"The Mystery of the Land of Olgas"		20 December 1997	Lost
04	"The Bilby Tale"	Mel Bradford	27 December 1997	Partially Found
05	"Bat Chat"		3 January 1998	Lost
06	"Good Wood"	Neil Booth	10 January 1998	Partially found in Russian dub
07	"Duke of Deceit"	Neil Booth	17 January 1998	Found in Russian dub
08	Currently unknown		24 January 1998	Lost
09	Currently unknown		31 January 1998	Lost
10	"The Dolphin Dare"		7 February 1998	Lost
11	"The Crustaceans"		14 February 1998	Lost
12	"Baron of Babel"	Neil Booth	21 February 1998	Found
13	"Snail's Pace"		28 February 1998	Lost
14	"Losers Have No Choice"		6 March 1998	Lost
15	"In Defense of Forest Chanterelles"		13 March 1998	Lost
16	"Return of Yak"		20 March 1998	Lost
17	"Cranes to the Rescue"		27 March 1998	Lost
18	"Black Chamber"		3 April 1998	Lost
19	"Sea Beneath the Sea, Beneath the Sea"	Neil Booth	10 April 1998	Found in Russian dub
20	"Funga Wunda"	Neil Booth	17 April 1998	Found
21	"Yesterday, Today & Tomorrow"	Wayne Moore and Terry Burstall	24 April 1998	Found in Russian dub
22	"Journey to Pedra Blanca"	Neil Booth	1 May 1998	Found in Russian dub
23	"Java Lava"	Wayne Moore and Terry Burstall	8 May 1998	Found in Russian dub
24	"Tapir Caper"	Wayne Moore and Terry Burstall	15 May 1998	Found in Russian dub
25	"Mirage Master"	Mike Heffernan	22 May 1998	Found in Russian dub
26	"Small Hippo, Big Bust"		29 May 1998	Lost

There is uncertainty of where the episodes "Straits of Sorrow" and "The Howling Crystal" go on the list of episodes.

=== Other names for the show ===
When it aired in Poland, the series' title was Grupa specjalna Eko. In Italy, the show was known as Parola d'ordine: arriviamo! The show is also known to have aired in the Arab world, Brazil, Korea, Malaysia, New Zealand, Portugal and Russia.

== Production ==
The series was created by Melvyn Edward Bradford, produced by Roo Films Brisbane from December 1989 to 1993, and distributed by Motion Picture Management Studios Australia. Originally scheduled to be completed by 1992, it experienced a series of lawsuits and legal battles during production, causing it to be delayed. The series would eventually air in New Zealand in 1992, Malaysia in 1994-1998, Italy in 1995, and Australia in 1997-1998. The series was animated by Pacific Rim Animation. The theme song, "Friends on Freedom's Frontier", and the episodes' songs, such as "Cross The Line (Start, Don't Stop)" and "Don't Look Back", were composed and produced by Matthew Sloggett, with lyrics by Bradford and Bob LaCastra, while the soundtrack was composed by Garry McDonald and Laurie Stone and mixed at Grevillea Studios. The voices were recorded at Sunshine Studios, provided by Gennie Nevinson, Ric Melbourne, Lee Perry, Grahame Matters, and Tony Bellette.

A 93-minute direct-to-video compilation film titled Mephisto's Web was commissioned in the first half of 1993 and completed in February-March 1994, but was never released, with the accounting firm, Krampel Newman & Partners Pty Ltd, cheating Bradford out of his money.

== Revival attempts ==
In the late 2000s, four revivals of the series were attempted; a series of animated shorts named The Dinky-Di's 2, a graphic novel, a stop motion pilot and an animated sequel. The Dinky-Di's 2 was a continuation of the original series, where the Dinky-Di's were to face a new villain, Maraudo, and his holographic alien henchmen. The series would have also had a robot named DDRobo, who would work in the Dinky-Dis' High-Tech Control Room.

Bradford was planning on giving the series a DVD release, but died at his computer desk of a cerebral aneurysm caused by coronary artery disease.

== Credits list ==
- Associate Producer – Mike Heffernan
- Production Manager – Rhonda Fortescue
- Production Supervisor (China) – Mark Lovick
- Production Co-Ordinator – Kerry Mulgrew
- Production Accountants – Debra Cole and Lyn Paeiz
- Production Secretary – Patricia Mcinally
- Production Receptionist – Tammy Sovenyhazi
- Script Editor – Mel Bradford
- Animation – Pacific Rim Studios
- Studio Representative – Richard Hindley
- Character Designers – Kelvin Hawley, Brian Doyle, Andrew Trimmer, Glenn Ford, Fräntz Kantor, Ray Van Steenwyk, Sue Schmidt, Paul Fitzgerald, and Ted Blackall
- Backgrounds – Dean Taylor – Mr. Big, Peter Sheehan, Kelvin Hawley, Paul Fitzgerald, Andrew Trimmer, Glenn Ford, Ray Van Steenwyk, Sue Schmidt, Fräntz Kantor, Ted Blackall
- Props – Kelvin Hawley, Glenn Ford, Paul Fitzgerald, Andrew Trimmer, Sue Schmidt, Fräntz Kantor, Brian Doyle, Ray Van Steenwyk, and Ted Blackall
- Story Boarders – Bob Smith, Kelvin Hawley, Bill Moselen, Ray Van Steenwyk, Glenn Ford, Fräntz Kantor, Steve Lumley
- Script Clerk – Fiona Matters
- Voice Recordings – Sunshine Studios
- Character Voices – Gennie Nevinson, Ric Melbourne, Lee Perry, Grahame Matters, Tony Bellette
- Mag Tracks – Hoyts Jumbuck
- Theme Song/Cross The Line (Start, Don't Stop)/Don't Run with the Pack/Love Comes to the Rescue/Don't Look Back/Don't Call Me A Hero/What About The Animals/Reach Out – Lyrics: Mel Bradford and Bob Lacastra, Composer: Matthew Sloggett
- Score – Garry McDonald, Laurie Stone
- Post Supervisor – Rod Herbert
- Film Editor – Bob Bladsall

This link has the list of credits on the episode at the end.
