= Girl (1994 film) =

- Written by: Peter Thompson
- Directed by: Peter Thompson
- Starring: Karoine Hohlweg; Kristy Pappas
- Country of origin: Australia
- Original language: English

Production
- Producers: Phillip Emanuel; John Hipwell
- Production companies: Phillip Emanuel Productions; Hips Film & Video Productions
- Budget: $400,000

Original release
- Release: 1994

Girl is a 1994 Australian film directed by Peter Thompson and starring Karoine Hohlweg and Kristy Pappas. The screenplay concerns four teenagers who enter a magazine photo competition.
