= Blabbermouth (play) =

1996 play by Mary Morris

- Author: Mary Morris
- Cover artist: Hana and Jana Hartig
- Language: English
- Genre: Sup
- Publisher: Currency Press
- Publication date: 1996
- Publication place: Australia
- Media type: Print (Paperback)
- ISBN: 978-0-86819-421-9

Blabbermouth is a play by Australian playwright Mary Morris, adapted from the book of the same name by Morris Gleitzman.

== Plot ==
The play concerns a young girl, Rowena, who moves to a new country town and school. Although Rowena can hear she is mute. Her widowed father has a penchant for satin cowboy shirts and embarrassing his daughter in public. This is a story about disability, friendship, fitting in, and how children and adults try to co-exist.

== Original production ==
Blabbermouth was first produced by the Melbourne Theatre Company at The Fairfax, Victorian Arts Centre, 10 September 1993 with the following cast:

- DAD: Michael Bishop
- ROWENA BATTS: Doris Younane
- DARRYN/MR COSGROVE/MR FOWLER/AUCTIONEER/OFFICER/ANDY: Patrick Moffatt
- MS DUNNING/YOBBO/MRS GRANGER: Merridy Eastman
- AMANDA/YOBBO: Sally Cooper
- MRS COSGROVE/MEGAN/YOBBO: Jane Turner
- Directed by David Carlin
- Designed by Trina Parker
- Lighting by Greg Diamantis
