= List of Always Greener episodes =

The following is a list of episodes of Always Greener.

== Series overview ==
Season	Episodes	Originally aired	
Season	Episodes	First aired	Last aired
1	22	9 September 2001	3 June 2002
2	28	8 September 2002	8 June 2003

== Season 1 (2001-02) ==
No. overall	No. in season	Title	Directed by	Written by	Original release date
1	1	"The Other Man's Grass"	Kevin Carlin	Anthony Ellis	9 September 2001
2	2	"Where, What, Why, When, How?"	Kevin Carlin	Anthony Ellis	16 September 2001
3	3	"Close Encounters of the Furred Kind"	Kevin Carlin	Bevan Lee	23 September 2001
4	4	"Movers and Shakers"	Scott Hartford Davis	Anthony Ellis	30 September 2001
5	5	"Pinch Me Linda, I'm Really Here!"	Scott Hartford Davis	Margaret Wilson	7 October 2001
6	6	"Keep Off the Grass"	Rob Stewart	Phillip Dalkin	14 October 2001
7	7	"Love, Pain and the Whole Damned Thing"	Rob Stewart	Louise Crane	21 October 2001
8	8	"Dog Days"	Russell Burton	Andrew Kelly	28 October 2001
9	9	"Call It Fete"	Russell Burton	Chris Bates	4 November 2001
10	10	"Sisters Are Doing it for Themselves"	Scott Hartford Davis	Tracey Trinder	11 November 2001
11	11	"The String in the Biscuit"	Scott Hartford Davis	Mardi McConnochie	18 November 2001
12	12	"The Mating Urge"	Ali Ali	Margaret Wilson	25 November 2001
13	13	"Baby Love"	Ali Ali	Ysabelle Dean	31 March 2002
14	14	"Bright Sparks"	Mark Piper	David Phillips	7 April 2002
15	15	"What's in a Name?"	Mark Piper	Mardi McConnochie	14 April 2002
16	16	"History Repeating"	Kevin Carlin	David Hannam	21 April 2002
17	17	"Extraordinary Ordinary"	Kevin Carlin	Marieke Josephine Hardy	29 April 2002
18	18	"The Good Woman's Guide to a Happy Home"	Chris Martin-Jones	Sue Hore	6 May 2002
19	19	"Mirror Image"	Chris Martin-Jones	Glen Dolman	13 May 2002
20	20	"A Cross to Bear"	Mark Piper	Anthony Ellis	20 May 2002
21	21	"A Man Walks into a Bar..."	Mark Piper	Margaret Wilson	27 May 2002
22	22	"Cliffhanger"	Kevin Carlin	Mardi McConnochie	3 June 2002

== Season 2 (2002-03) ==
No. overall	No. in season	Title	Directed by	Written by	Original release date
23	1	"Here We Go Again"	Scott Hartford Davis	Margaret Wilson	8 September 2002
24	2	"Endangered Species"	Scott Hartford Davis	Jutta Goetze	15 September 2002
25	3	"Two Sides to Every Story"	Mark Piper	Anthony Ellis	22 September 2002
26	4	"Black, White and Grey"	Mark Piper	Mardi McConnochie	29 September 2002
27	5	"It Takes Balls"	Chris Martin-Jones	Sarah Duffy	6 October 2002
28	6	"In the Beginning, I Was Afraid"	Chris Martin-Jones	Margaret Wilson	13 October 2002
29	7	"Opening Gambit"	Scott Hartford Davis	Tracey Trinder	27 October 2002
30	8	"Share Space"	Scott Hartford Davis	Grant Wolf	3 November 2002
31	9	"Understanding the Cry"	Cath Roden	Louise Fox	10 November 2002
32	10	"Why is It So?"	Cath Roden	Marieke Josephine Hardy	17 November 2002
33	11	"A Death in the Family"	Chris Martin-Jones	Andrew Kelly	24 November 2002
34	12	"Guilt Trip"	Chris Martin-Jones	Sue Hore	16 February 2003
35	13	"The Always Greener Variety Hour"	Scott Hartford Davis	Anthony Ellis	23 February 2003
36	14	"Flesh for Fantasy"	Scott Hartford Davis	Elizabeth Coleman	2 March 2003
37	15	"You Must Have Been a Beautiful Baby"	Catherine Millar	Anthony Ellis	9 March 2003
38	16	"The Long Weekend"	Catherine Millar	Margaret Wilson	16 March 2003
39	17	"Great (and Not So Great) Expectations"	Chris Martin-Jones	Marieke Josephine Hardy	23 March 2003
40	18	"...And Greener...and Greener"	Chris Martin-Jones	Abe Pogos	30 March 2003
41	19	"More Things in Heaven and Earth, Elizabeth"	Mark Piper	Anthony Ellis	6 April 2003
42	20	"A Tangled Web"	Mark Piper	Boaz Stark	13 April 2003
43	21	"Cause and Effect"	Pino Amenta	Fiona Wood	20 April 2003
44	22	"Surfboards in the Roof"	Pino Amenta	Jutta Goetze	27 April 2003
45	23	"The Trouble is it's Christmas"	Kate Woods	Jason Herbison	4 May 2003
46	24	"What a Difference a Year Makes"	Kate Woods	Louise Fox	11 May 2003
47	25	"Boxing Day"	Mark Piper	Marieke Josephine Hardy	18 May 2003
48	26	"5,4,3,2,1... Happy New Year"	Mark Piper	Margaret Wilson	25 May 2003
49	27	"True Romance"	Catherine Millar	Jason Herbison	1 June 2003
50	28	"Future Shocks"	Catherine Millar	Anthony Ellis	8 June 2003

== See also ==
- Always Greener
