= Phillip Emanuel =

Australian film producer

Phillip Emanuel (1946–2011) was an Australian film producer.

== Select Credits ==
- The Wild Duck (1984)
- Rebel (1985)
- Takeover (1987)
- Those Dear Departed (1987)
- Two Brothers Running (1988)
- Kokoda Crescent (1989)
- Weekend with Kate (1990)
- Fatal Past (1993)
- Point of No Return (1994)
- Girl (1994)
- Rainbow's End (1995)
- Offspring (1996)
- A Divided Heart (2005)
