= Always Greener =

Television series

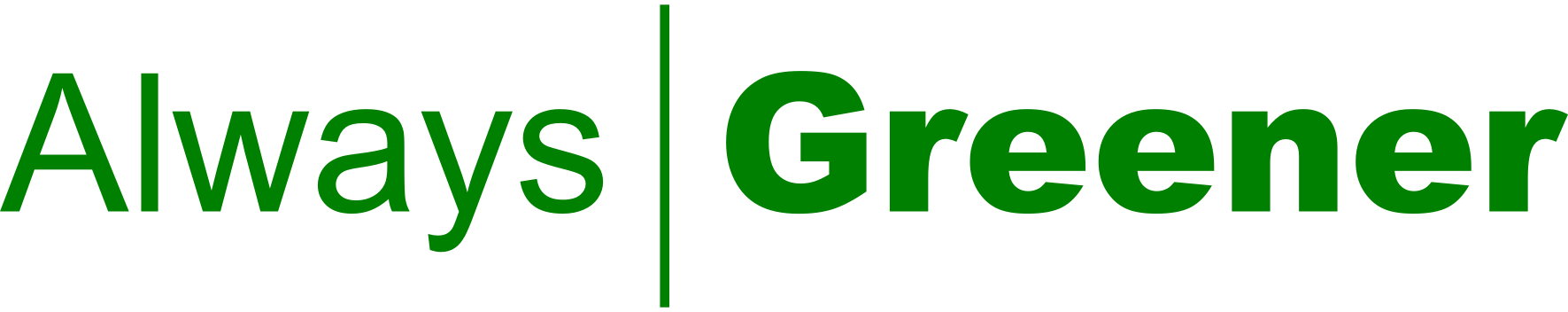
- Genre: Drama
- Created by: Bevan Lee
- Written by: Anthony Ellis; Margaret Wilson
- Starring: John Howard; Anne Tenney; Michala Banas; Daniel Steven Bowden; Natasha Lee; Caitlin McDougall; Bree Walters; Abe Forsythe; Scott Major; Clayton Watson
- Country of origin: Australia
- Original language: English
- No. of seasons: 2
- No. of episodes: 50 (list of episodes)

Production
- Executive producer: John Holmes
- Producer: Jo Porter
- Production location: New South Wales
- Running time: Approximately 1 hour; (with ads)
- Production company: Southern Star Group

Original release
- Network: Seven Network
- Release: 9 September 2001 – 8 June 2003

Related
- Packed to the Rafters

Always Greener is an Australian television drama/comedy series that aired on the Seven Network which followed the fortunes of two families, one from the city and the other from the country, when they decide to switch homes and start a new direction in life for themselves. It ran from 2001 until 2003, when it was cancelled after declining ratings and concerns over the cost of production.

== History ==
The name of the show stems from the phrase "The grass is always greener on the other side". Promotion of the show's premiere episode used the Travis song "Side," which features the phrase as part of the chorus. The show was broadcast overseas in New Zealand on TV ONE. In 2006 reruns started airing on TV2. The series has since been released on DVD.

The Southern Star Group owns the rights to distribute Always Greener internationally.

== Premise ==
The series mainly revolved around the members of two families, the Taylors, who live in suburban Sydney, and the Todd family who live on a farm just outside the rural New South Wales town of Inverness. Each faced with problems of their own, John Taylor pays a Christmas visit to his sister Sandra Todd at her farm. Joking that they should consider switching houses for a change in their lives, the move becomes a reality when John discovers that his daughter Marissa is on drugs and Sandra can't pay the bills. Always Greener was noted for both dealing with serious issues as well as putting an often humorous touch to episodes. Fantasy sequences (such as a song and dance number when John mulls over having a vasectomy) were common and often added to the charm of the series.

== Cast ==
Anne Tenney (Liz Taylor), John Howard (John Taylor), Caitlin McDougall (Sandra Todd)

=== The Taylor family ===
- John Howard as John Taylor
- Anne Tenney as Liz Taylor
- Michala Banas as Marissa Taylor
- Daniel Steven Bowden as Jason Taylor
- Natasha Lee as Kimberley Taylor

=== The Todd family ===
- Caitlin McDougall as Sandra Todd
- Bree Walters as Pip Todd
- Abe Forsythe as Campbell Todd

=== Other main characters ===
- Scott Major as Tom Morgan
- Andrew Clarke as Derek Unn
- Merridy Eastman as Eileen Unn
- Denise Roberts as Isabelle Turnbull
- Georgie Shew as Katy Turnbull
- Peter Corbett as Bert Adams
- Bree Desborough as Shelley Southall
- Clayton Watson as Mickey Steele
- Grant Bowler as Greg Steele (Episodes 1–27)
- Nathaniel Dean as Craig 'Patch' Porter (Episodes 9–50)
- Steven Rooke as Nick Greenhill (Episodes 16–50)

=== Recurring ===
- Bartholomew John as Gregory Kind (6 episodes)
- Betty Lucas as Florence Holiday (5 episodes)
- Craig McLachlan as Greg Graham (5 episodes)
- Eddie McGill as Eddie McGill (4 episodes)
- Felicity Price as Anne Clark (4 episodes)
- Ian Turpie as Rollie Fields / Rollie Meadows (6 episodes)
- Lynette Curran as Connie Linguini (9 episodes)
- Matt Doran as Scumbag (7 episodes)
- Matt Passmore as Pete 'The Love Professor' Jones (14 episodes)
- Peter Collingwood as Dr Dalrymple (6 episodes)
- Roy Billing as Eddie McGill (4 episodes)

=== Guests ===
- Amy Mathews as T'ree (1 episode)
- Annalise Braakensiek as Self (1 episode)
- Annie Byron as Lolly Hopkins (3 episodes)
- Bruce Spence as Rev Millburn (3 episodes)
- Carmen Duncan as Antonia Jones (1 episode)
- Genevieve Lemon as Loretta (1 episode)
- Hayley McElhinney as Fleur (1 episode)
- James Smillie as Frank (1 episode)
- Jeanne Little as Julia the Chicken / Self (1 episode)
- John Adam as Bryce Richards (1 episode)
- John Orcsik as Mario Linguini (3 episodes)
- Kate Fitzpatrick as Chantal Wilkinson (2 episodes)
- Kieran Darcy-Smith as Trevor Southall (1 episode)
- Kylie Watson as Dancer (1 episode)
- Lois Ramsey as Old Woman (1 episode)
- Maggie Dence as Sister Stern (1 episode)
- Maria Venuti as Lorraine (2 episodes)
- Mary Coustas as Cher the Chicken (1 episode)
- Michael Caton as Jack (1 episode)
- Michael Craig as Judge (1 episode)
- Natalie Saleeba as Christy Schaffer (3 episodes)
- Nicholas Hammond as Nigel Milne (1 episode)
- Oliver Ackland as Matt Payne (1 episode)
- Paula Duncan as Makeup Artist (1 episode)
- Simon Chilvers as Charlie Parker (1 episode)
- Tim Campbell as Joe Farnell (3 episodes)
- Tina Bursill as Lucy Buckingham (2 episodes)
- Wayne Pygram as Trevor Southall (1 episode)
- Zac Drayson as Devo (2 episodes)

== Ratings ==
Season	Episodes	Originally aired		Viewers (in millions)	Rank
Season	Episodes	Season premiere	Season finale	Viewers (in millions)	Rank
1	22	9 September 2001	3 June 2002	1.738	#2
2	28	8 September 2002	8 June 2003	1.150	#8

== Awards ==
Clayton Watson won the Australian Film Institute's award for "Best Actor in a Supporting or Guest Role in a Television Drama" for his work on Always Greener in 2002. The show was also nominated for an International Emmy Award in 2002 and Always Greener and its cast have been nominated for several Logies during its run.

Logie Awards

- 2003 Nominee: Most Outstanding Drama Series
- 2003 Nominee: Most Outstanding Actor in a Drama Series (John Howard)
- 2002 Nominee: Most Outstanding Drama Series
- 2002 Nominee: Most Popular New Female Talent (Michala Banas)

ASSG Australian Screen Sound Awards

- 2003 Nominee: Best Achievement in Sound for a Television Drama ("Episode 50")

APRA-AGSC Screen Music Awards

- 2002 Nominee: Best Music for a Television Series or Serial (Paul Healy and Trent Williamson)

Australian Film Institute Television Awards

- 2002 Winner: Best Actor in a Supporting or Guest Role in a Television Drama (Clayton Watson)

International Emmy Awards

- 2002 Nominee: Always Greener Series 1 – Episodes 1 & 3

Australian Writers' Guild Awards

- 2002 Nominee: Television (Series): "The Good Woman's Guide To A Happy Home" (Sue Hore)

== Cancellation ==
On 6 July 2003, Seven's Director of Programming and Production, Tim Worner announced the renewal of Always Greener saying: "Always Greener is an important program for Seven. We see it as a key franchise for us, a program we believe will continue to build in its third season." Then in September, the decision was reversed. News was broken to cast and crew as the first script meetings for the new series were already being held.

The cancellation was rumoured to be due to falling ratings. The show began with over 2 million viewers in 2001, but ratings never recovered from the disastrous decision to début the second season in the low rating Easter period of 2002 – Against stronger competition in both '60 Minutes' and 'Big Brother'. In 2002 the show moved from Sunday to Monday and then back to Sunday by 2003. Always Greener was rating around 1.0 million when cancelled. However, Seven cited "cost management" as the reason for dropping the series.

At the time, Worner was reported as saying that the decision was purely based on cost, because the 22 episodes were to cost $10 million, which he said was far too much.

In late 2005 Seven aired reruns of the show in the early morning 9:30am timeslot and again in Seven's popular reruns timeslot at 12:00pm. Presently, it airs sporadically on Universal Channel.

== Home media ==
Always Greener DVD collection

The first season of Always Greener have been released on DVD in Region 4 (Australia) format. The DVDs are distributed by Madman Entertainment under the label of VIA Vision Entertainment. A photo gallery is included in Season 1 (Vol. 2) and Season 1 (Complete).

Always Greener Australian DVD Release
DVD Name	Release Date	Episodes	Rating	Discs	Runtime
Season 1 (Volume 1)	7 March 2007	Episodes 1–11	M	3	472 minutes
Season 1 (Volume 2)	7 March 2007	Episodes 12–22	M	3	484 minutes
Season 1 (Complete)	10 October 2007	Episodes 1–22	M	6	956 minutes
Season 2 (Volume 1)	Unreleased	Episodes 23–36	M	3	TBA
Season 2 (Volume 2)	Unreleased	Episodes 37–50	M	3	TBA

== See also ==
- List of Australian television series
