= Castle season 1 =

Castle
- Season 1
- DVD cover
- Starring: Nathan Fillion; Stana Katic; Jon Huertas; Seamus Dever; Tamala Jones; Ruben Santiago-Hudson; Molly C. Quinn; Susan Sullivan
- No. of episodes: 10

Release
- Original network: ABC
- Original release: March 9 – May 11, 2009

Season chronology
- Next → Season 2

The first season of American crime-comedy-drama television series Castle premiered as a midseason replacement on ABC on March 9, 2009. The season aired from March 9, 2009, to May 11, 2009. The first season consisted of 10 episodes.

== Overview ==
Richard Castle (Fillion) is a famous mystery novelist who has killed off the main character (Derek Storm) in his popular book series and has writer's block. He is brought in by the NYPD for questioning regarding two copy-cat murders based on two of his novels. He is intrigued by this new window into crime and murder, and uses his connection with the mayor to charm his way into shadowing Detective Kate Beckett (Katic). Castle decides to use Beckett as his muse for Nikki Heat, the main character of his next book series. Beckett, an avid reader of Castle's books, initially disapproves of having Castle shadow her work, but later warms up and recognizes Castle as a useful resource in her team's investigations.

== Cast ==
=== Main cast ===
- Nathan Fillion as Richard Castle
- Stana Katic as Det. Kate Beckett
- Jon Huertas as Det. Javier Esposito
- Seamus Dever as Det. Kevin Ryan
- Tamala Jones as Dr. Lanie Parish
- Ruben Santiago-Hudson as Captain Roy Montgomery
- Molly C. Quinn as Alexis Castle
- Susan Sullivan as Martha Rodgers

=== Recurring cast ===
- Dan Castellaneta as Judge Markway
- Joseph C. Phillips as the Mayor
- Bailey Chase as Will Sorenson
- Stephen J. Cannell as himself
- Michael Connelly as himself
- Scott Paulin as Jim Beckett

== Episodes ==
No. overall	No. in season	Title	Directed by	Written by	Original release date	Prod. code	US viewers (millions)
1	1	"Flowers for Your Grave"	Rob Bowman	Andrew W. Marlowe	March 9, 2009	101	10.76
When a young woman is found dead, and the murder scene is staged exactly as described in a book written by acclaimed author Richard Castle, he is questioned to provide insight into the case. When two more victims turn up in similar conditions described in his books, Castle volunteers to assist in the investigation by adding his knowledge of criminal behavior and his own books to the police department's considerable skills. Castle becomes intrigued with the lead homicide detective on the case, Kate Beckett, and starts writing his next book with the main character based on her. At the end of the episode, Captain Montgomery informs Beckett that the mayor spoke with him about letting Castle shadow her to research the new character, much to her annoyance.
2	2	"Nanny McDead"	John Terlesky	Barry Schindel	March 16, 2009	103	10.97
When a nanny is found bludgeoned to death and stuffed into an apartment building clothes dryer, it sets off a convoluted investigation into the hows and whys of her death. Castle, now a part of the detective team through an arrangement with the mayor, lends his skills of envisioning scenarios and attention to detail to the investigation. This reveals that the victim and her best friend were sleeping with the fathers of their charges, but the truth behind the murder turns out to be more heartbreaking.
3	3	"Hedge Fund Homeboys"	Rob Bowman	David Grae	March 23, 2009	104	9.14
The shooting death in Central Park of a teenage boy from a rich family sends Castle and Beckett into the world of New York private academies, where circles of friends prove to be almost more conniving, evasive, and mysterious than they can fathom.
4	4	"Hell Hath No Fury"	Rob Bowman	Andrew W. Marlowe	March 30, 2009	102	9.09
When a city councilman is murdered and found stuffed in a rug, the department finds itself under intense pressure from the city government to explain what happened. However, it's discovered that the squeaky-clean politician was having an affair with a prostitute, which led to blackmail and ultimately his death. Beckett turns the tables on Castle and shows up at a bookstore reading of his latest release.
5	5	"A Chill Goes Through Her Veins"	Bryan Spicer	Charles Murray	April 6, 2009	105	9.03
The discovery of a waitress's hard-frozen body at a construction site leads the investigations of both her death 5 years ago and the more recent murder of her husband into unsolved cases from years past, tangling Beckett and Castle's case with a missing-persons case that was closed but never really solved.
6	6	"Always Buy Retail"	Jamie Babbit	Gabrielle Stanton & Harry Werksman	April 13, 2009	107	7.28
Someone is not just killing, but doing so ritualistically. Castle's knowledge of obscure rituals points to someone conducting a Vodun ritual; whatever the killer is doing, it is obvious that something has been lost and they want it back. However, trying to find the truth amidst illegal immigrants and confusing facts tests the abilities, and imaginations, of the team. Castle's first ex-wife, Meredith, pays him a visit.
7	7	"Home Is Where the Heart Stops"	Dean White	Will Beall	April 20, 2009	106	8.21
When a member of New York's high society is found murdered and stuffed into a small wall safe, the department is put under pressure to get to the bottom of the story. To get the answers to the string of robbery and murders, places must change. Rather than Castle visiting New York's dark alleys, Beckett must follow him into the glitzy world of high society after they discover that the robberies are only connected by the victims having attended a specific charity fundraiser.
8	8	"Ghosts"	Bryan Spicer	Moira Kirland	April 27, 2009	108	8.24
While unusual circumstances are practically usual, a soccer mom drowned in a hotel bathtub full of motor oil has the team scratching its collective head. The mystery deepens when investigation shows that the victim may have been involved with a crime more than 20 years old and was working with, or being stalked by, a true crime writer. The relationship between Castle and Beckett rears its truly competitive head during a poker game involving New York's legal system elite.
9	9	"Little Girl Lost"	John Terlesky	Elizabeth Davis	May 4, 2009	109	9.97
FBI agent Will Sorenson (Bailey Chase), who is one of Beckett's ex-boyfriends, requests Beckett's help in solving the kidnapping of a young child. As Castle butts in on the investigation, friction with Sorenson is inevitable—particularly since the case that first brought Beckett and Sorenson together ended with the death of the victim.
10	10	"A Death in the Family"	Bryan Spicer	Story by : Andrew W. Marlowe & Barry Schindel; Teleplay by : Andrew W. Marlowe	May 11, 2009	110	9.96
A plastic surgeon found suffocated in his car sends Castle and Beckett into a confusing world of cosmetic surgery, unstable patients, the mob, and the witness protection program. Against Beckett's wishes, Castle begins looking into her mother's murder and discovers that it might not have been as random as first thought.

== Reception ==
The first season received positive to mixed reviews from critics. The first season got a rating of 56% on Rotten Tomatoes based on 16 reviews. The season got a 54/100 rating on Metacritic. Keith Phipps from The A.V. Club gave the premiere a B, giving the series praise for managing to go outside the "cliché" characters, giving both Nathan Fillion and Stana Katic praise for their portrayal and saying that Katic "suggests unspoken vulnerability and need." Jonah Krakow from IGN also commented on the cliche storytelling as he said "Castle proves that even a show with an unoriginal idea can be interesting and enjoyable if done well." He also praised Fillion for his portrayal of Richard Castle: "Fillion's ability to convey humor, awe and sarcasm in even the most gruesome situations makes him the perfect choice for the role. Not every actor can do what he does and the writers do a good job of playing to his strengths."

== DVD release ==
Castle: The Complete First Season
Set details	Special features	
10 episodes; 430 Minutes; English (Dolby Digital 5.1 Surround); English SDH, Spanish and French subtitles	Bloopers & Outtakes; Whodunit: The Genesis of Castle; Spotlight Cast Piece: Producer Stephen J. Cannell; Exclusive Audio Commentaries; Write-Along With Nathan Fillion	
DVD release dates
Region 1	Region 2	Region 4
September 22, 2009	November 21, 2011	March 10, 2010

== Awards and nominations ==
Award	Category	Nominee	Result	Ref.
Primetime Emmy Awards	Outstanding Music Composition for a Series	Castle / "Flowers For Your Grave"	Nominated	
Satellite Awards	Best Actor in a Series, Drama	Nathan Fillion	Nominated	
Satellite Awards	Best Actress in a Series, Drama	Stana Katic	Nominated	
