= Australian Dream (1986 film) =

1986 film by Jackie McKimmie

- Directed by: Jackie McKimmie
- Written by: Jackie McKimmie
- Produced by: Jackie McKimmie; Sue Wild
- Starring: Noni Hazlehurst; Graeme Blundell; John Jarratt
- Cinematography: Andrew Lesnie
- Edited by: Sara Bennett
- Production company: Filmside Production Limited
- Distributed by: Daro Film Distribution; Southern Star Primetime
- Release date: 1986
- Running time: 91 minutes
- Country: Australia
- Language: English
- Budget: AU $600,000 or $870,000
- Box office: AU $45,000 (Australia)

Australian Dream is a 1986 Australian comedy film directed by Jackie McKimmie and starring Noni Hazlehurst, Graeme Blundell, John Jarratt. Funding was provided in part from the Queensland Film Corporation and Australian Film Commission. It was shot over four weeks and finished on 20 September 1985.

== Premise ==
Dorothy Stubbs is married to Geoff, who is Queensland's Butcher of the Year. While Geoff wants to be the next candidate in Parliament, Dorothy dreams of something more. She falls in love with male stripper, Todd.

== Cast ==
- Noni Hazelhurst as Dorothy Stubbs
- Graeme Blundell as Geoffrey Stubbs
- John Jarratt as Todd
- Brett Swain as Cop 2

== Production ==
McKimmie had made the successful short film Stations and written the television movie Madness of Two. She wrote a first draft for Australian Dream after completing Stations, then rewrote the script for Nonie Hazlehurst. "It takes the elements we know of middle class suburbia and takes the odd elements out of that and pushes them to the bizarre," said McKimmie. The script was originally written as a 55 minute film but was then expanded.

Tony Barry was originally cast as the male lead.

Noni Hazlehurst and John Jarratt began a romantic relationship on the movie.

== Reception ==
The movie was given a limited cinema release in late 1987. The Age called it "energetic and funny."
