= Fatal Past =

- Video release poster
- Directed by: Clive Fleury; Richard Ryan
- Produced by: Phillip Emanuel
- Starring: Costas Mandylor
- Cinematography: Andrew Lesnie
- Edited by: Ted Otton; John Scott
- Music by: Garry Hardman
- Production company: Phillip Emanuel Productions
- Distributed by: Skouras Pictures
- Release date: 21 September 1994
- Country: Australia
- Language: English

Fatal Past is a 1994 Australian thriller film.
