= Bree Walters =

Australian actress (born 1976)

Bree Walters (born 13 February 1976) is an Australian actress, best known for her role as Pippa Todd in Always Greener. She was born and raised in Sydney.
