= Merridy Eastman =

- Born: 1961 or 1962 (age 63–64); Canberra, Australia
- Occupations: Actress, writer
- Years active: 1983–present
- Children: 1

Merridy Eastman is an Australian actress and author.

After graduating from the National Institute of Dramatic Art in 1983, Eastman was a presenter on the children's television series Play School from 1985 until 1989. Although she made guest appearances on many television shows including A Country Practice, Halifax f.p., and the Australian soap opera Neighbours, Eastman is best known as a regular cast member of popular long running comedy-drama series Always Greener, and Packed to the Rafters.

Eastman is also known for her stage work. Her appearances include productions for the Melbourne Theatre Company (MTC), the Sydney Theatre Company (STC), the State Theatre Company of South Australia, Playbox/Malthouse in Melbourne, and for the Old Fitzoy Theatre and the Ensemble Theatre in Sydney. In 1996, she received a nomination for Best Female Supporting Actor in a Drama at the Green Room Awards for her performance in Hannie Rayson's Competitive Tenderness. And for her appearance in Hand to God, she won Best Performance in a Supporting Role in an Independent Production at the 2022 Sydney Theatre Awards.

In addition to her stage and screen work, Eastman is the author of four autobiographical novels, three published by Allen & Unwin, the first becoming a national best seller. She has also contributed to two anthologies published by Pan Macmillan and Penguin.

== Early life and education ==
Eastman was born in Canberra in 1961 to parents Berenice, a teacher librarian, and Walter Eastman OAM, a radio announcer and ABC TV presenter. Eastman has an older sister and a younger brother. When Eastman was 11 years old the family moved from Rockhampton Queensland to Hobart in Tasmania. She attended The Friends' School, and completed her HSC at Rosny College. As a teenager in Hobart, Eastman performed in several theatre productions, including as Peter Pan at the Theatre Royal and as one of the von Trapp children in The Sound of Music, directed by John Unicomb. But it was after seeing a production of Sam Shepard and Patti Smith's Cowboy Mouth in Hobart, that Eastman decided she wanted to study theatre.

== Career ==
=== Theatre ===
After graduating from NIDA in 1983, Eastman performed in several productions with the State Theatre Company in South Australia. In 1989 she appeared in Toe Truck Theatre Company's production of Hating Alison Ashley, adapted from the book of the same name, at Sydney's Seymour Centre. The following year she played Valeria in Gale Edwards's production of The Rover both for the Adelaide Festival and then at the York Theatre in the Seymour Centre. In 1990 Eastman began working for the Melbourne Theatre Company appearing in many productions over the next ten years including The Heidi Chronicles, This Old Man Comes Rolling Home,The House of Blue Leaves, A Christmas Carol, Noel Coward's Hay Fever, Gulliver's Travels,The Dutch Courtesan with Geoffrey Rush, the stage adaptation of Morris Gleitzman's novel Blabber Mouth for the MTC and Arena Theatre Company, The Comedy of Errors, and Absurd Person Singular. Describing her performance as Lady Cynthia Muldoon in Tom Stoppard's The Real Inspector Houndfor the MTC,The Age critic Helen Thomson wrote, "Merridy Eastman brings her own particular brand of air-headed inconsequence with excellent effect to the role"..

Eastman also played Helena for the Australian Shakespeare Company's outdoor productions of A Midsummer Night's Dream in both Melbourne and Sydney, directed by Glenn Elston, from 1993 to 1995, and played Grumio in their production of The Taming of the Shrew at the Melbourne Royal Botanic Gardens. In late 1996, Eastman played Amelia in the Playbox Theatre Company's production of Hannie Rayson's Competitive Tenderness at The Malthouse., and was nominated for Best Female Supporting Actor in a Drama at the 14th Green Room Awards.

In 2001, Eastman played Miss Pearl in the Sydney Theatre Company's production of Dymphna Cusack's Morning Sacrifice at the Wharf Theatre. In 2003 she starred in Noises Off at Melbourne's Comedy Theatre as Dotty Otley. The Age critic Helen Thomson wrote: "[Eastman] is one of the few actors in Australia who can reduce an audience to hysterics just by standing in front of it."

In 2003 Eastman appeared alongside Miriam Margolyes in the MTC-STC production of Blithe Spirit including a season at the Sydney Opera House.. From 2004 to 2010 Eastman lived in Germany, and did not return to the stage until 2016, performing alongside Sophie Hensser in the romantic comedy A History of Falling Things at the Ensemble Theatre.. In 2019 Eastman appeared again at the Ensemble Theatre in Melanie Tait's The Appleton Ladies Potato Race.. For her performance in Robert Askins' black comedy Hand to God at the Old Fitz Theatre, Eastman won Best Performance in a Supporting Role in an Independent Production at the 2022 Sydney Theatre Awards. In 2025, she played the Nurse in Bell Shakespeare's production of Romeo and Juliet that included a season at the Theatre Royal in Hobart, before the company concluded their national tour at the Sydney Opera House.

=== Film and television ===
After graduating from NIDA, Eastman became a presenter on Play School from 1985 until 1989. Her television appearances have included A Country Practice, Boys from the Bush, Halifax f.p.,Neighbours, ABC The Glynn Nicholas Show,Good Guys, Bad Guys, The Man from Snowy River, Home and Away, Blue Heelers, Flat Chat, All Saints,, the documentary film City of Dreams in which she played architect Marion Mahony Griffin, and a guest role in the comedy drama series Rake.

From 2001 until 2003, Eastman played Eileen Unn in the Seven Network drama/comedy series Always Greener.. And from 2011 to 2013 Eastman joined the cast of Packed to the Rafters playing Donna, best friend to Julie Rafter (Rebecca Gibney). Eastman reprised her role for Back to the Rafters, a revival of Packed to the Rafters, which aired on Amazon Prime Video in September 2021.

=== Writing ===
In addition to her acting career, Eastman is also the author of three humorous memoirs published by Allen & Unwin. Her first, There's A Bear In There, a national bestseller, tells the story of her time working as a weekend receptionist at a brothel in Sydney for ten months. This book was followed by Ridiculous Expectations about Eastman's time on a British book tour and how she met her German husband. The third memoir How Now Brown Frau follows Eastman's time living in Bavaria and becoming a mother, while the fourth I Knew We Weren't Spanish! details her search for the truth about her father's family, and discovering her hidden Aboriginal ancestry. .. She has also been a contributing writer to two anthologies: Penguin's Thanks for The Mammaries and Just Between Us from Pan Macmillan. Eastman contributed to the book of the 2008 Australian musical comedy Breast Wishes, which raises awareness and money for the National Breast Cancer Foundation. In 2013, she joined the Wentworth Courier as the Urban Goddess columnist.

== Personal life ==
Eastman, her husband Tom and their son live in Sydney.

While researching her fourth book, Eastman discovered that her father's great-grandfather was not a Spanish pirate as she'd been told, but a Worimi man from the Paterson River in New South Wales. With the help of her cousin, Dr William Jonas, a Professor of Geography who went on to become Australia's Race Discrimination Commissioner, and the Aboriginal and Torres Strait Islander Social Justice Commissioner., Eastman has unearthed much family history, met further cousins, and has continued educating herself about Aboriginal history.

== Acting credits ==
=== Film and television ===
Year	Title	Role	Notes
1985	Glass Babies	Rhonda	Miniseries
1985–1989	Play School	Presenter	
1988	A Country Practice	Leanne Madden	Episodes: "Mixed Blessings: Part 1 & 2"
1991	Boys from the Bush	Carol	Episode: "State and Commonwealth"
1994	Baby Bath Massacre	Miss Mills	Television film
1994	Halifax f.p.	Nikki Toser	Episode: "Acts of Betrayal"
1995–1996	Neighbours	Judy Bergman	Recurring role
1996	The Glynn Nicholas Show	Victoria / Mrs Mule / Mrs Spud	Episodes: "The Cat & the Fiddle", "Home Alone", "The Tragic History of the Insurance Claim"
1997	Good Guys, Bad Guys	CAE Supervisor	Episode: "Unfinished Business"
1998	The Man From Snowy River	Freda Marshall	Episode: "The Claimant"
1999	Blue Heelers	Patricia Chalmers	Episode: "The Deepest Cut"
1999	Home and Away	Lauren Healy	Recurring role
2000	City of Dreams	Marion Mahony Griffin	Documentary film
2001	Flat Chat	Katie	Main cast
2001	All Saints	Meg Starr	Episode: "Bend Till You Break"
2001–2003	Always Greener	Eileen Unn	Main cast
2011–2013	Packed to the Rafters	Donna Mackey	Main cast
2016	Rake	Tonia	Episode: 4.2
2021	Back to the Rafters	Donna Mackey	Main cast

=== Theatre ===
Year	Title	Role	Company
1985	The Taming of the Shrew	Kate	Shakespeare in the Park Company
1987	Onkaparinga	—	DT2 Company
1987–1988	Hating Alison Ashley	Margaret	Toe Truck Theatre
1989	The Rover	Valeria	State Theatre Company of South Australia (STCSA)
1990	The Heidi Chronicles	Jill	Melbourne Theatre Company (MTC)
1990	This Old Man Comes Rolling Home	Edie	MTC
1990	The House of Blue Leaves	Nun	MTC
1990	A Christmas Carol	Elizabeth	MTC
1991	Hay Fever	Jackie	MTC
1992	Gulliver's Travels	Queen	MTC
1993	The Dutch Courtesan	Mistress Mulligrub	MTC
1993	Blabbermouth	Ms Dunning	MTC and Arena Theatre Company
1993–1995	A Midsummer Night's Dream	Helena	Australian Shakespeare Company
1996	Competitive Tenderness	Amelia	Playbox Theatre Company
1997	The Comedy of Errors	Luciana	MTC
1997	The Real Inspector Hound	Cynthia Muldoon	MTC
1998	The Taming of the Shrew	Grumio	Australian Shakespeare Company
1998	Absurd Person Singular	Jane	MTC
2001	Morning Sacrifice	Miss Dora Pearl	Sydney Theatre Company (STC)
2003	Noises Off	Dotty Otley	Marriner Theatres
2003	Blithe Spirit	Mrs Bradman	MTC and STC
2016	A History of Falling Things	Lesley	Ensemble Theatre
2019	The Appleton Ladies Potato Race	Barb Ling	Ensemble Theatre
2022	Hand to God	Margery	Red Line
2025	Romeo and Juliet	Nurse	Bell Shakespeare

== Bibliography ==
- There's A Bear In There (and He Wants Swedish!) (2002)
- Ridiculous Expectations (2006)
- How Now Brown Frau (2011)
- I Knew We Weren't Spanish! (TBA)
