= Bree Bain =

Australian actress

- Born: Bree Desborough; 22 September 1979 (age 47); Sydney, New South Wales, Australia
- Occupation: Actress
- Years active: 1995–present
- Known for: Home and Away

Bree Bain (née Desborough; born 22 September 1979) is an Australian actress. She is known for her role as Justine Welles in the soap opera Home and Away.

== Career ==
Bain began her acting career in 1995, making her debut in a guest appearance in medical series G.P.. She made a guest appearance on Water Rats before landing her first major role on the soap opera Home and Away, playing the part of Justine Welles for three years from 1997 to 2000. Desborough tackled several controversial storylines as Justine, including drug addiction and false imprisonment for battering a baby who later died.

She is also known for her role as Shelley Southall on the short-lived drama series Always Greener, for which she appeared from 2002 to 2003. In 2004, Desborough played a small role in the television mini-series Salem's Lot, a remake of the 1979 cult mini-series, based on the novel by Stephen King.

Her other television credits include the Canadian television series The Smart Woman Survival Guide, the television film Curse of the Iron Mask and All Saints. In 2009, she appeared in her first feature film, I Wish I Were Stephanie V, with Clayton Watson and Kain O'Keeffe.

== Filmography ==
=== Film ===
Year	Title	Role	Notes
2005	The Intruder	Angela	Short film
2010	I Wish I Were Stephanie V	Angela Matthews	
2012	Bathing Franky	Susie	
2014	The Half Dead	Patty	Post-production
2023	The Royal Hotel	TBD	Telluride Film Festival 2023
TBA	Shadow Wars	Patty	Post-production

=== Television ===
Year	Title	Role	Notes
1995	G.P.	Tanya	Episode: "Trapped"
1996	Water Rats	Sally	Episode: "V.I.P."
1997–2000	Home and Away	Justine Welles	Series regular
2001–2003	Always Greener	Shelley Southall	Series regular
2004	Salem's Lot	Sandy McDougall	TV film
2006	The Smart Women Survival Guide	Registration Woman	Episode: "Basic Instinct"
2007	Curse of the Iron Mask	Ivory	TV film
2009	All Saints	Claudia	Episode: "Behind Closed Doors"
2018–2019	After Nightfall	Melinda Naylor	4 episodes
2019	Time & Place	Katie Sim	Webseries
2023	The Lost Flowers of Alice Hart	May	Miniseries (3 episodes)
