= Caitlin McDougall =

Australian actress

Caitlin McDougall is an Australian actress who is best known for her roles in the television series Always Greener and The Alice.

== Early life and education ==
McDougall was born in Melbourne, Victoria, and grew up in the state of South Australia.

She graduated from the Western Australian Academy of Performing Arts in 1992.

== Career ==
McDougall worked in theatre, for the Melbourne Theatre Company; the Australian Shakespeare Company in Melbourne, Adelaide and Sydney; and has performed comedy in the Melbourne Comedy Festival and Sydney Fringe.

McDougall has appeared in the feature films Hey Hey It's Esther Blueburger (2008) and Ned, and the short comedy film You Better Watch Out (2008). She also appeared in the television film The Last of the Ryans.

Her television roles have included Always Greener (2001–03), The Alice (2005–06), All Saints, Neighbours, A Country Practice, Ocean Girl, Newlyweds and Xena: Warrior Princess.

== Personal life ==
McDougall married to actor Erik Thomson since 1999, and they have a daughter called Eilish and a son named Magnus. She co-starred with Thomson in the Australian drama series The Alice.

As of July 2022 they live at Port Willunga, South Australia. In 2025 McDougall and Thomson confirmed they had separated.

== Filmography ==
=== Film ===
Year	Title	Role	Type
2008	Hey, Hey, It's Esther Blueburger	Miss Koolkats	Feature film
2003	Ned	Mrs Kelly	Feature film
2008	You Better Watch Out	Mother	Short film

=== Television ===
Year	Title	Role	Type
1993	Neighbours	Ruth Avery	Guest role; 8 episodes
1994	Newlyweds	Tracy	Episode: "Fatal Attraction"
1994	A Country Practice	Jacqueline Norris	Episode: "Solomon's Child"
1995	Ocean Girl	Lieutenant Borg	Recurring role
1997	The Last of the Ryans	Shelly	Television film
1998	Xena: Warrior Princess	Nogolin	Episode: "A Good Day"
2000	All Saints	Jodie Reeves	Episode: "Valley of the Shadow: Part 1"
2001–2003	Always Greener	Sandra Todd	Main cast
2004	The Alice	Helen Gregory	Television film
2005–2006	The Alice	Helen Gregory	Main cast
