= Jackie McKimmie =

Australian writer and director

Jackie McKimmie (born 1950) is an Australian writer and director of films and television.

== Select credits ==
- Madness of Two (1982) – writer
- Stations (1983) (short)
- Australian Dream (1986)
- Waiting (1991)
- Gino (1993)
- Fireflies (2004) (TV series) – writer
