= Steven Rooke =

Australian actor

- Education: Queensland University of Technology
- Occupation: Actor
- Years active: 2001–present

Steven Rooke is an Australian actor who has performed on stage, in films and television.

== Education ==
Rooke graduated from Noosa District State High School in 1996, and received a Bachelor of Fine Arts (acting) from the Queensland University of Technology in 2000.

== Career ==
Rooke joined theatre company Shake and Stir as a masterclass instructor.

== Reviews ==
In Aussie Theatre Bobbie-Lea Dionysius wrote of Rooke's performance in Gasp! that he was, " enjoyable to watch as always".

Rooke's performance in Gloria was reviewed as,

Having come into the rehearsal period as a late replacement, Rooke did a great job fitting into the cast. Rooke always has a strong presence onstage and is enjoyable to watch. However, the role felt quite stifling for the actor capable of so much more

Sonny Clarke wrote of Rooke in Kelly "the night really belonged to the exceptional talents of Steven Rooke and ..."

== Awards ==
- 2009 Matilda Awards Winner Best Actor in a Main Role
- 2010 Matilda Awards nominated Best Male Actor in a Supporting Role
- 2011 Matilda Awards Winner for his outstanding body of performance work in 2011 including No Man's Land, Julius Caesar and The Removalists
- 2011 Matilda Awards Winner Best Male Actor in a Supporting Role
- 2012 Matilda Awards nominated Best Male Actor in a Leading Role
- 2014 Matilda Awards nominated Best Male Actor in a Supporting Role

== Filmography ==
=== Films ===
| Year | Title | Role | Ref. |
|---|---|---|---|
| 2002 | Blurred | Rodney | |
| 2006 | Footy Legends | Terry | |
| 2009 | Quiet : You'll Wake up the War (short) | Jake | |
| 2010 | The Chronicles of Narnia: The Voyage of the Dawn Treader | Faun | |
| 2017 | Mr Brisbane (short) | Petruchio | |
| 2020 | Forever First Love (short) | Paul | |
| 2021 | Fall from a Height (short) | Damian | |

=== Television ===
| Year | Title | Role | Notes | Ref. |
|---|---|---|---|---|
| 2001 | All Saints | Gordon Williams | 1 episode | |
| 2001 | Beastmaster | Podo-Man | Episode: "The Prize" | |
| 2001 | Home and Away | Miles Alcott | 15 episodes | |
| 2002–2003 | Always Greener | Nick Greenhill | 16 episodes | |
| 2012 | Commercials | TAB, RAMS, Tooheys | | |
| 2014 | Shapelle | Journo Aus 4 | TV movie | |
| 2016 | Wanted | Jackson Delaney | 2 episodes | |
| 2016 | Hoges | Gym Instructor (uncredited) | TV miniseries | |
| 2017 | Commercial | Qld Govt Road Safety | | |

== Theatre ==
| Year | Title | Venue |
|---|---|---|
| 1999 | A Handful of Stars | QUT |
| 2000 | They Shoot Horses Don't They | QUT |
| 2000 | The Mill on the Floss | QUT |
| 2000 | Spurboard | QUT |
| 2002 (9 Apr-4 May) | 48 Shades of Brown | La Boite |
| 2006 | Australian THeatre of the Deaf | School Tour |
| 2008 (26 Nov-6 Dec) | Anatomy Titus Fall of Rome | Merlyn Theatre, Southbank, VIC |
| 2009 (18 Mar-4 Apr) | The Pillowman | Sue Benner Theatre, Brisbane, QLD |
| 2009 (13-22 May) | The Exception and the Rule | Bille Brown Studio, Brisbane |
| 2010 (31 May-26 Jun) | Fat Pig | Bille Brown Studio, Brisbane |
| 2011 (12 Feb - 20 Mar) | Julius Caesar | Roundhouse Theatre, Kelvin Grove |
| 2011 (21 Jul-6 Aug) | The Removalist | Bille Brown Studio, Brisbane |
| 2011 (19 Sep-22 Oct) | No Man's Land | Bille Brown Studio, Brisbane |
| 2011 (28 Oct-11 Dec) | No Man's Land | Drama Theatre (Sydney Opera House) |
| 2012 (15 Sep-20 Oct) | Kelly | Cremorne Theatre, South Brisbane |
| 2013 (18-28 July) | 1001 Nights | The Greenhouse, South Brisbane, |
| 2014 (22 Mar-13 Apr) | Macbeth | Playhouse, South Bank |
| 2014 (19 Jul-16 Aug) | Gloria | Bille Brown Studio, Brisbane |
| 2014 (25 Oct-9 Nov) | Gasp | Heath Ledger Theatre, Northbridge |
| 2014 (17 Nov-7 Dec) | Gasp | Playhouse, South Bank |
| 2015 (12 May) | Kelly | Gasworks Arts Park, Albert Park |
| 2015 (22 Oct-8 Nov) | The Odd Couple | Playhouse, South Bank |
