= Anne Tenney =

Australian actress

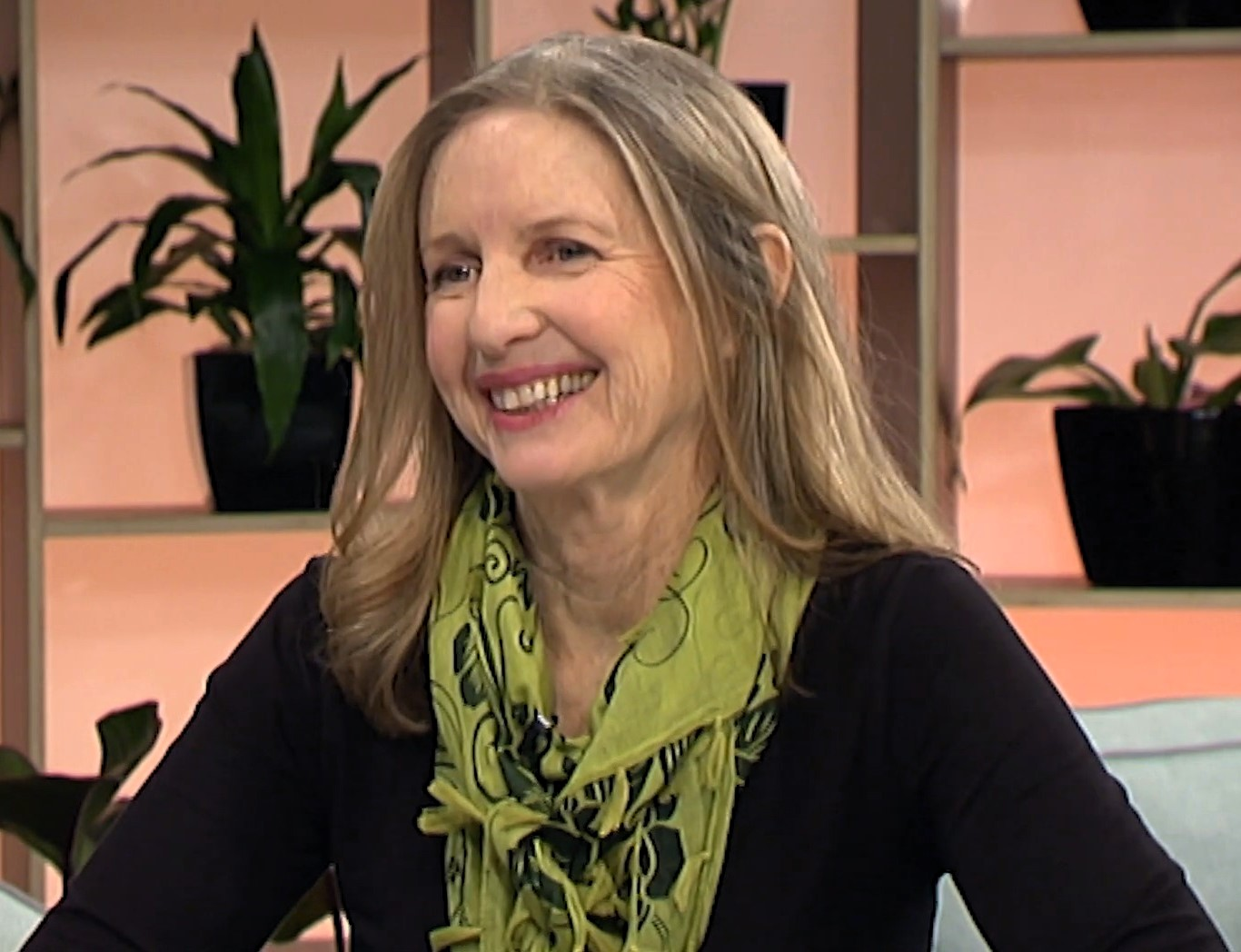
- Tenney in 2018
- Born: 1954 (age 71–72); Sydney, New South Wales, Australia
- Education: National Institute of Dramatic Art
- Occupation: Actress
- Years active: 1979–present
- Known for: Film - The Castle; Television - A Country Practice, Always Greener
- Spouse: Shane Withington

Anne Tenney (born 1954) is an Australian film, television and theatre actress, perhaps best known for her roles as Melissa "Molly" Jones in the television drama A Country Practice, Liz Taylor in Always Greener, and as Sal Kerrigan opposite Michael Caton in the major hit film The Castle.

Tenney started her career in guest roles in several Australian drama series, before joining the cast of A Country Practice in 1981. She left the show in 1985.

She was then to have roles in Police Rescue, Brides of Christ, E Street, Water Rats, Always Greener, All Saints, headLand and Packed to the Rafters,

On 16 September 2024, Tenney was named as part of the cast for Paramount+ series Playing Gracie Darling.

== Filmography ==
=== Films ===
Year	Title	Role	Type
1987	Australian Summer	Role unknown	Short film
1989	Luigi's Ladies	Jane	Feature film
1996	Dead Heart	Sarah	Feature film
1997	The Castle	Sal Kerrigan	Feature film
2003	Subterano	Elaine	Feature film
2013	Spit	Mum	Short film
2013	The Gift	Grace	Short film

=== Television ===
Year	Title	Role	Type
1979	Skyways	Guest role: Eileen	TV series, 1 episode
1980	Timelapse	Guest role	TV series, 1 episode
1980	Australian Theatre Festival: The Department	Role unknown	Teleplay
1981	Bellamy	Guest role: Eileen	TV series, episode 11: "A Matter of Upbringing"
1981-1985	A Country Practice	Regular role: Molly Jones/Melissa 'Molly' Jones	TV series, 299 episodes
1985	Flight into Hell	Regular role: Kate Webber	TV miniseries, 2 episodes
1987	Takeover	Hilda Oppenheimer	TV movie
1988	Fragments of War: The Story of Damien Parer	Marie Parer	TV movie
1989	Fresh Start	Guest role: Linda	TV series, 1 episode
1990	Elly & Jools	Regular role: Anna Traveller	TV series, 12 episodes
1990	E Street	Recurring role: Dr. Susan Franklin	TV series, 6 episodes
1991	Police Rescue	Guest role: Katie McCarthy	TV series, 1 episode 9:"One for Dad"
1991	Brides of Christ	Guest role: Liz Heffernan	TV miniseries, 1 episode
1994	Escape from Jupiter	Regular role: Helen	TV series, 13 episodes
1995	Fire	Recurring role: Anne Risdale	TV series, 5 episodes
1995	The Feds: Abduction	Suzi Plummer	TVovie series, 1 episode
1995-1996	G.P.	Recurring guest role: Jenny King	TV series, 3 episodes
1997	Big Sky	Guest role: Gillian Masters	TV series, 1 episode
1997-1999	Water Rats	Recurring role: Gail Hawker	TV series, 5 episodes
1998	Murder Call	Guest role: Nerida Hertzberg	TV series, 1 episode
2001-2003	Always Greener	Regular role: Liz Taylor	TV series, 50 episodes
2005	All Saints	Recurring guest role: Trish Turner	TV series, 3 episodes
2005-2006	Headland	Regular role: Kerry Lewis	TV series, 13 episodes
2013	Cliffy	Eunice	TV movie
2017	Drop Dead Weird	Guest role: Arminta Fogle	TV series, 1 episode
2019	Drop Dead Weird	Guest role: Mrs. O'Shea	TV series, 1 episode
2021	Back to the Rafters	Guest role: Charmaine	TV series, 1 episode
2022	Underbelly: Vanishing Act	Regular role: Barbara Grimley	TV Miniseries, 2 episodes
2023	RFDS	Guest role: Tess	TV series, 1 episode
2025	Playing Gracie Darling	Moira Darling	TV series: 6 episodes

=== Television guest appearances (as herself) ===
Year	Title	Role	Type
2001	Good Morning Australia	Guest	TV series, 1 episode
2006	TV Turns 50: The Events That Stopped a Nation	Guest (with A Country Practice cast: Lorrae Desmond, Brian Wenzel, Joan Sydney, Shane Porteous, Josephine Mitchell, Joyce Jacobs & Emily Nichol)	TV Special
2010	Today Tonight	Guest (A Country Practice location tour)	TV series, 1 episode
2015	Studio 10	Guest	TV series, 1 episode
2016	Studio 10	Guest (with Noel Hodda)	TV series, 1 episode
2018	The Morning Show	Guest	TV series, 1 episode

== Awards ==
In 1985, Tenney won the 'Most Popular Lead Actress' award at the Logies for her role as Melissa 'Molly Jones' in A Country Practice. Tenney went on to win 'NSW Most Popular Female' and 'Most Popular Australian Actress' in 1986 for the same role.

== Personal life ==
Tenney grew up in Sydney, Australia, graduating from the National Institute of Dramatic Art in 1979. She is married to actor Shane Withington, who played her on screen husband Brendan Jones on A Country Practice.
