= Michael Falzon (actor) =

Australian actor and singer (1972–2020)

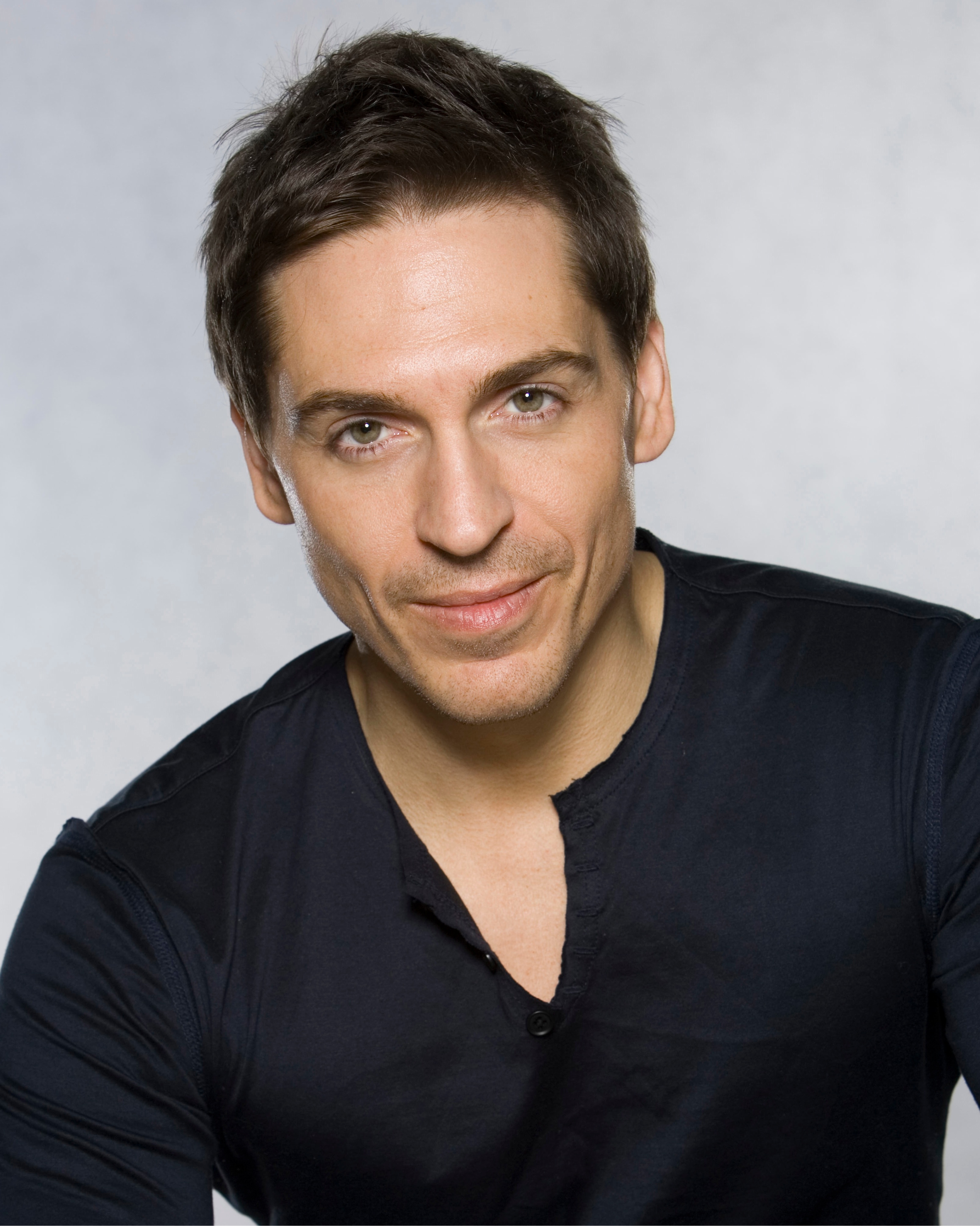
- Michael Falzon, photograph by Gavin D. Andrew

Background information
- Born: 16 May 1972; Sydney, New South Wales, Australia
- Died: 23 June 2020 (aged 48) Australia
- Genres: Musical Theatre; Swing
- Occupations: Singer, actor, producer
- Years active: 1994–2019
- Website: www.michaelfalzon.com

Michael Falzon (16 May 1972 – 23 June 2020) was an Australian musical theatre/rock tenor actor, and producer, who ran his own production company, Good Egg Creative.

Primarily known for his roles in We Will Rock You, Rock of Ages, and Hedwig and The Angry Inch, his career encompassed intimate cabaret performances including Michael Falzon and Trio, and Michael Falzon – Plugged In! through to arena performances in Jeff Wayne's Musical Version of The War of the Worlds, both in Australia and in Europe. He performed in the Queen/Ben Elton musical We Will Rock You throughout Australia, Asia and Europe, and was the first 'Galileo' outside the UK (Melbourne, 2003) as well as the first in an arena production (Dublin O2 Arena in 2010). Falzon was also known for TV and film roles including the cult short film Computer Boy. He performed with symphony orchestras around Australia, and in 2013 joined the Tasmanian Symphony Orchestra to record I Dreamed A Dream: The Hit Songs of Broadway for ABC Classics and in 2016, featured on the cast recording of Atomic (The New Rock Musical) singing the role of physicist Leo Szilard. He appeared in the Australian leg of The Music of Queen: Rock and Symphonic Spectacular in Sydney and Perth. Falzon was producer (through his company Good Egg Creative) and a founding member of Swing on This.

== Biography ==
Falzon was third of six children born to a Maltese father and an Australian mother. His family moved to Brisbane from Sydney in his early teens.

He attended Kelvin Grove High School in Brisbane, known for its drama department, where he was an active member of the school choir and musical productions. Upon graduation, he intended studying English and Psychology at University of Queensland, but deferred to focus more on performance.

He credited the Harry M. Miller arena production of Jesus Christ Superstar, starring John Farnham and Jon Stevens in 1992, as inspiring him to a career in musical theatre. Falzon had the opportunity to perform in Jesus Christ Superstar, playing the role of Judas at AIS Arena in Canberra in June 2015.

Falzon listed his first leather jacket as one of his favourite possessions. He wore the jacket to his successful audition for We Will Rock You.

He took the role of Galileo in the Edinburgh Playhouse production of We Will Rock You in part because he had not been to Edinburgh before and wished to see the city.

In 2019, Falzon was diagnosed and began treatment for a rare and aggressive form of germ cell cancer, causing him to cancel all appearances for the remainder of the year.

Falzon died from cancer on 23 June 2020, aged 48. He is survived by his wife, violinist Jane Cho.

== Early career ==
Falzon started singing professionally in Brisbane with VocalPoint, an 8-part group specializing in close harmony, and performing both nationally and internationally. It was through his work with VocalPoint that he was invited to audition for The Pirates of Penzance in 1994, in which he was cast. Falzon's appearance in the QPAC and EssGee Entertainment production marked the start of his professional career and he toured with the company to New Zealand.

He returned to EssGee as a sailor in HMS Pinafore, understudying the role of Ralph, after performing in Hello Dolly in 1995 for The Gordon/Frost Organisation. Falzon also toured internationally with the Really Useful Company production of Joseph and the Amazing Technicolor Dreamcoat.

Both HMS Pinafore and Pirates of Penzance were recorded for DVD.

In 2000 he starred in the short film Computer Boy, a parody of the successful film The Matrix for Abe Forsythe. Falzon played the role of Neo, and won a Melbourne Underground Film Festival for Best Actor. He styled the character after The Matrix's actor, Keanu Reeves's portrayal of Ted from Bill and Ted's Excellent Adventure.

During this period, Falzon began a production company (SMA Productions) with entertainer colleagues providing event entertainment packages all over the world. He split his time between performing and managing his production company Good Egg Creative.

=== Early theatre roles ===
| Production | Role | Company | Location | Date |
|---|---|---|---|---|
| The Pirates of Penzance | U/S Frederick | Opera Queensland & Essgee Entertainment | Australia, New Zealand | 1994 |
| Hello, Dolly | U/S Ambrose Kemper | GFO / Adelaide Festival Trust | | 1995 |
| HMS Pinafore | Sailor U/S Ralph Rackstraw | Opera Queensland & Essgee Entertainment | Australia, New Zealand | 1997 |
| Joseph and the Amazing Technicolor Dreamcoat | Joseph cover | Really Useful Company & Ascot Group | Singapore, Hong Kong, New Zealand | 1998/99 |

== Theatre ==
=== 2003–2005 ===
In 2003, Falzon was cast in the lead role (Galileo Figaro) for the Australian production of We Will Rock You. The show had opened in the West End in 2002, and was followed by Melbourne in August, 2003 (the first production outside the UK) before touring the rest of Australia in 2004/2005. Featuring the music of Queen and book by Ben Elton, the production allowed Falzon to combine his love of rock music with his career as a stage actor. He starred alongside Kate Maree Hoolihan as Scaramouche, Amanda Harrison as Oz, Jason Chong as Brit, Robert Grubb as Pop, Annie Crummer as Killer Queen and Ross Givern as Khashoggi. Of the experience, Falzon said

"To work with these guys and have them have faith in you to be able to tell the story and channel Freddy (sic) Mercury for people that love his voice and his music, its very humbling and tremendously exciting." – The Sunday Times, 8 December 2013

We Will Rock You toured in Melbourne (7 August 2003 – 4 March 2004 Regent Theatre), Perth (27 April – June 2004 Burswood Theatre) and Brisbane (27 July – 25 September 2004 QPAC), before finishing in Sydney (9 October 2004 – 13 March 2005 Star City Lyric Theatre). Falzon left the touring production at the end of its Australian run only to return to the role of Galileo in Japan after Peter Murphy (who had since taken over the role) badly injured his knee.

=== 2006–2008 ===
In 2007 Falzon was cast as the Artilleryman in the Australian and New Zealand tour of Jeff Wayne's Musical Version of The War of The Worlds- Alive on Stage. The only touring company outside Europe included album alumni Chris Thompson, and Justin Hayward in their original roles, and was supplemented by the addition of Falzon (Artilleryman), Rachael Beck (Beth) and Shannon Noll (Parson). The cast performed against a towering 30-foot Machine Fighting Machine and the holographic head of narrator Richard Burton, as well as musical talents of the 48-piece ULLAdubULLA Strings and 10-piece Black Smoke Band, conducted by composer Jeff Wayne.

After five weeks rehearsal, he donned lashes, a mini-dress and knee-high boots as "Hedwig Schmitt" in John Cameron Mitchell's glam rock musical Hedwig and the Angry Inch for David M Hawkins (Showtunes). He was supported by co-star Lucinda Shaw as Yitzhak during the highly successful 2008 Brisbane and Sydney run.

=== 2009–2011 ===
Falzon returned to the role of Galileo again in 2009/10 for the UK tour of We Will Rock You, replacing Alex Gaumond, and performing opposite Sarah French-Ellis as Scaramouche and Brenda Edwards as Killer Queen. He performed at both the Edinburgh Playhouse from 4 November 2009 to 9 January 2010 and at the Dublin O2 Arena.

In 2010 he returned briefly to Australia from London, for a one-off concert performance of Adam Guettel's Floyd Collins. Falzon played the role of Homer opposite Peter Cousens as Floyd, under the musical direction of Anne-Maree MacDonald.

He joined the 2009 Harvest Rain Theatre Company production of Joseph and the Amazing Technicolour Dreamcoat, in the role of an Elvis inspired, Robbie Williams influenced Pharaoh.

Falzon returned to The War of the Worlds in 2010 for its European tour, this time creating two new roles, that of an astronomer (William Rowland, teamed with Lily Osborne as Vera May) at the commencement of the musical, and during the epilogue as NASA controller Marvin Krauth (voiced by Jerry Wayne). The 20 date arena tour of the UK and Europe included Amsterdam, Dublin and Manchester along with London's Wembley and O2 arenas.

Returning permanently to Australia in 2011 for Rock of Ages, Falzon starred as the quintessential 80's rocker, creating a character, that brought "sexual charisma to monstrously vain Stacee Jaxx", according to the Herald Sun. The character being a pastiche of bad boy rockers from the 80s, he drew on several iconic rock bands for inspiration including Bon Jovi, Van Halen and Whitesnake for the role. Rock of Ages also starred End of Fashion front man Justin Burford as Drew and Amy Lehpamer as Sherry. Rock of Ages played in Melbourne and Brisbane in its eight-month run.

=== 2012–2019 ===
In 2012 Squabbalogic and Darlinghurst Theatre premiered the Adam Gwon penned chamber musical Ordinary Days, with Falzon originating the role of Jason in Australia. Directed by Grace Barnes and under the musical direction of Paul Geddes, the show starred Rachael Beck as Claire, as well as Erica Lovell (Deb) and Jay James-Moody (Warren). Set in New York, Ordinary Days was sung entirely acoustically, with the sole support of Geddes on piano.

In The Production Company's Green Room Award winning 2012 re-imagining of Chess, he "created an ominous presence as The Arbiter (the bare-chested Chess referee) and his solo number brought the house down with his ability to engage an audience." Aussie Theatre, 24 August 2012 Directed by Gale Edwards and featuring music by Björn Ulvaeus and Benny Andersson and lyrics by Tim Rice, Chess starred Alinta Chidzey, Bert La Bonte, Mark Dickinson, Martin Crewes, Silvie Paladino and Simon Gleeson. As with all The Production Company ventures, Chess ran for 10 performances at Melbourne's Arts Centre, from 18–26 August 2012.

Falzon returned to the UK in November 2012 to reprise his 2010 role in the stage production of Jeff Wayne's Musical Version of The War of The Worlds. A complete New Generation of not only the stage production, but the seminal rock album from which it came was announced 11 November 2011. Academy Award nominee Liam Neeson led the cast in the holographic role of The Journalist, replacing Richard Burton, with Will Stapleton, Jason Donovan and Ricky Wilson taking roles on stage. This production was filmed at London's O2 Arena on 15 December and released in cinemas through Universal Pictures.

On 25 September 2013 it was announced that he would play scientist Leó Szilárd in the world premiere of Atomic. With a book and lyrics by Danny Ginges and Gregory Bonsignore; and music and lyrics by Philip Foxman, this musical explores the relationship of the scientist and the woman he loves against the moral dilemma of building the ultimate weapon. Falzon stated that a motivating factor in his decision to accept the role, as well as the contemporary rock score (composed by Philip Foxman), was the opportunity to create an entirely new, unestablished character. Atomic is to be directed by Damien Gray and star Falzon as Leo Szilard with Bronwyn Mulcahy as Trude Weiss Szilard; David Whitney as Enrico Fermi; Simon Brook McLachlan; Blake Erickson; Lana Nesnas and Christy Sullivan. Its premiere season was from 16 to 30 November 2013 at NIDA Parade Theatre in Sydney. Atomic was recast for its Off Broadway debut the following year, however Falzon was called to New York to record the cast album.

Falzon returned to theatre in 2015 to play Judas in Jesus Christ Superstar at AIS Arena Canberra opposite Luke Kennedy as Jesus. His performance was described as "riveting, commanding the stage and traversing the fine line between villain and victim. It is a tour de force performance that compels engagement." (Peter Wilkins, Sydney Morning Herald)

Theatre
| Production | Role | Company | Location | Date |
|---|---|---|---|---|
| We Will Rock You | Galileo | Phil McIntyre, Michael Coppel, Queen, Tribecca | Australia | 7 August 2003 – 13 March 2005 |
| We Will Rock You | Galileo | Michael Coppel Presents, Amuse Japan | Tokyo, Japan | 27 May 2005 – 24 August 2005 |
| Best We Forget – The Wharf Revue | Various roles | Sydney Theatre Company | Sydney | 15 June 2006 |
| Jeff Wayne's Musical Version of The War of the Worlds | The Artilleryman | Jeff Wayne /Michael Chugg | Arena Concert tour Australia, New Zealand | 8–29 September 2007 |
| Hedwig and the Angry Inch | Hedwig | Showtunes | QPAC Brisbane, Karnac Playhouse, Queensland, Metro Theatre, Sydney | 8 October-18 November 2008 |
| Joseph and the Amazing Technicolour Dreamcoat | Pharaoh | Harvest Rain | Brisbane | 18–22 March 2009 |
| We Will Rock You | Galileo | Phil McIntyre, Queen, Trebecca | Edinburgh Playhouse, Dublin O2 Arena | 4 November 2009 to 9 January 2010; 20 to 31 January 2010 |
| Floyd Collins | Homer | Meredith Shaw | City Recital Hall Angel Place; | 3 May 2010 |
| Jeff Wayne's Musical Version of The War of the Worlds | William Rowland/Marvin Krauth | Live Nation | UK/Europe arena tour | 24 November 2010 – 18 December 2010 |
| Rock of Ages | Stacee Jaxx | Newtheatricals | Melbourne, Brisbane | 9 April – 4 December 2011 |
| Ordinary Days | Jason | Squabbalogic/Darlinghurst Theatre | Sydney | 19 January – 19 February 2012 |
| On the Twentieth Century (staged reading) | Bruce Granit | Neglected Musicals | Sydney | 5 March 2012 |
| Chess | the Arbiter | The Production Company | Melbourne | 18–26 August 2012 |
| Jeff Wayne's Musical Version of The War of The Worlds The New Generation – Alive on Stage! | William Rowland/Marvin Krauth | Live Nation | UK/Europe arena tour | 29 November 2012 – 7 January 2013 |
| Atomic | Leo Szilard | Dreamingful Productions | Sydney | 16 – 30 November 2013 |
| Jesus Christ Superstar | Judas | Sneddon Hall & Gallop in Association with PeeWee Productions | AIS Arena Canberra | 2 – 7 June 2015 |
| Evita (musical) | Magaldi | Opera Australia | Joan Sutherland Theatre – Sydney Opera House; State Theatre – Arts Centre Melbourne | 13 September – 3 November 2018; 5 December 2018 – 27 January 2019 (extended to 6 March 2019) |
| Sweeney Todd: The Demon Barber of Fleet Street * | Adolfo Pirelli | TEG Life Like Company | Darling Harbour Theatre, ICC Sydney Her Majesty's Theatre, Melbourne | 13 – 16 June 2019 20 – 23 June 2019 |

- Falzon was forced to withdraw from this production due to ill health, which was later discovered to be cancer. He was also due to appear in The Production Company's Thoroughly Modern Millie in August.

== Concert ==
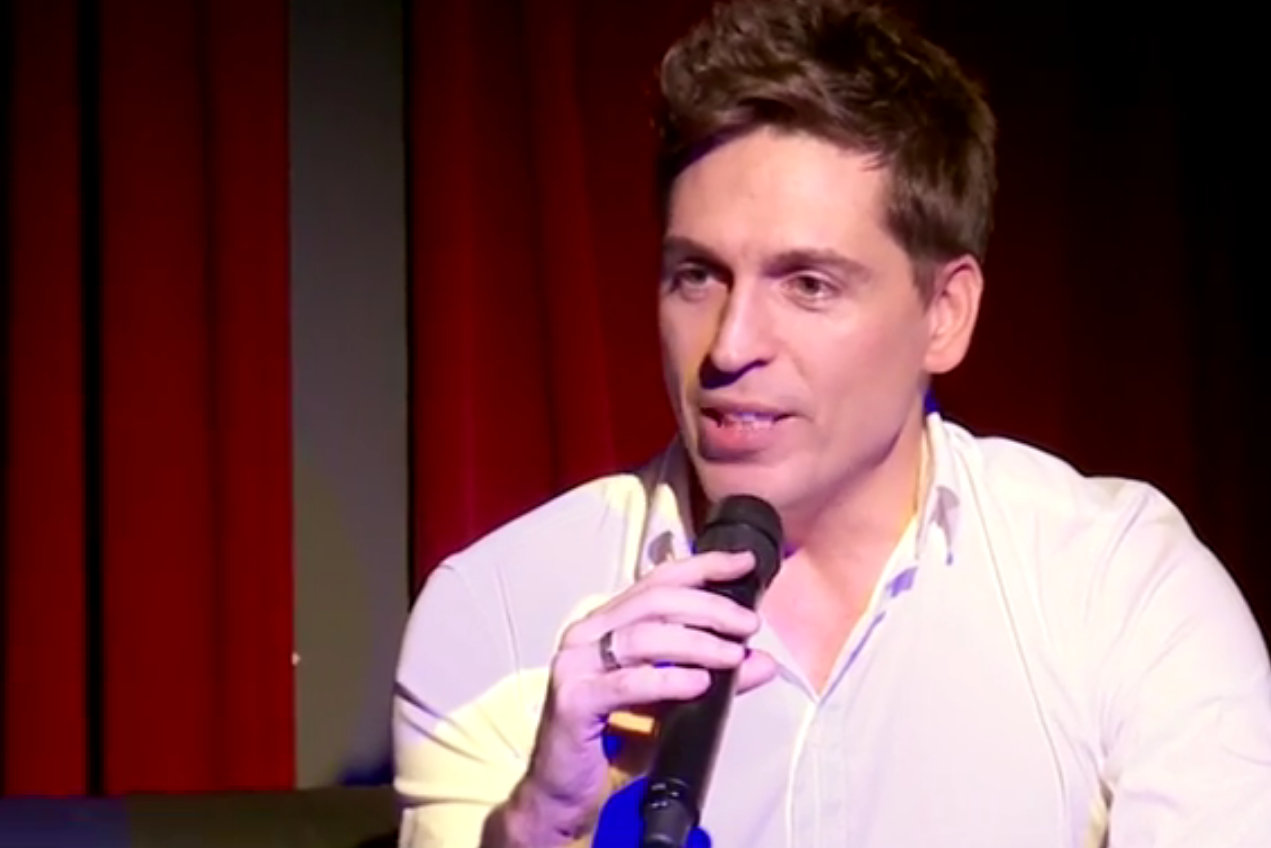
Falzon mentoring at the Greenroom Project, the Arts Centre, Gold Coast in July 2013

Since the beginning of his career, Falzon has performed in concert many times as both a featured artist and as a soloist. This has included a gala performance of Side By Side By Sondheim for Enda Markey featuring a cast of outstanding Australian musical theatre stars and special guest Ruthie Henshall (continuing on as the male vocalist in the touring version of the revue). He has performed Live at the Basement with his own band as well as a show in the Sydney Musical Theatre Cabaret Festival in 2012. He headlined Wickedly Showstopping with former Wicked star Lucy Durack. Falzon performed in concert with the Tasmanian Symphony Orchestra in June 2013 for TSO goes to Broadway with Trisha Crowe and Guy Noble, which coincided with the launch of the musical theatre compilation album I Dreamed A Dream: Hits Songs of Broadway. He was also a frequent guest performer for dignitaries including former Olympic gold medallist Betty Cuthbert and CHOGM heads of state including former British Prime Minister Tony Blair. As a former cast member of the Wharf Revue, Falzon performed at the Sydney Opera House 40th Birthday Concert. He again performed at the Sydney Opera House supported by the Sydney Symphony Orchestra, this time with Mig Ayesa, Amanda Harrison and Carly Thomas-Smith for three performances of "The Music of Queen – Rock and Symphonic Spectacular" in Sydney, followed by a further three in Western Australia. The concert series began on 7 February 2014 followed by two performances on 8 February, before three performances in Perth, Western Australia (Joondalup Resort, Riverside Theatre and Boardwalk Theatre) with the Perth Symphony Orchestra from 13–15 February. All three of the Opera House performances sold out and the Perth shows were at capacity, including an 8000 person event for the City of Joondalup at the Joondalup Resort.

Whether it's the gay community, Variety, breast cancer support – it doesn't matter. If it's something I believe needs support I'll always get behind it and in the end all I'm doing is singing some songs and that's not a huge commitment on my part. — Falzon to Star Observer, 20 April 2008

He was a keen supporter of many charities, having performed at associated fundraisers including Light The Night, Hats Off!, Twisted Broadway, Variety and Make-A-Wish Foundation.

As part of The Rat Pack's Back – an act he co-created and produced internationally – Falzon has appeared at a variety of venues including private events around the world and a sold-out performances at Perth Zoo, Crown and Jupiters Casinos, Twilight at Taronga, as part of Australia's Fire and Flood Benefit for the British Red Cross, at London's Palace Theatre (in the wake of the 2009 natural disasters affecting the east coast of Australia), and alongside Jonathan Pryce, Judi Dench and Alfred Molina for Swing on a Star in London.

Falzon performed works by Elvis Costello and Burt Bacharach based around the album Painted From Memory in concert with fellow musical theatre star Bobby Fox at City Recital Hall in Sydney on 24 September 2014 and toured the east coast of Australia in 2015. Falzon approached Fox in 2014 with a view to recreate the iconic 1998 album because, in his words, "it's very much written from the heart and experience and it resonates so deeply with people. Because of the lyrics and because you can hear that hurt, you get all the emotions. And with Bacharach and Costello it's not just the lyrics; there are the clever arrangements that take you there anyway" (Michael Falzon to Bernard Zuel in the Sydney Morning Herald, 20 September 2014). Painted From Memory was produced by City Recital Hall and directed by Jonathan Biggins with musical director Isaac Haywood.

Falzon, with Luke Kennedy, Ben Mingay, Matt Lee formed Swing on This, for the Adelaide Cabaret Festival. They were later joined by Rob Mills.

Concert
| Concert | Producer | Location | Date |
|---|---|---|---|
| Michael Ball (Featured Vocalist) | Lyric Theatre | Sydney | 2001 |
| Showstoppers | Sydney Symphony Orchestra | Sydney | 2 – 4 November 2006 |
| LTN: Light The Night | Leukaemia research | Sydney | 13 November 2006 |
| Live at the Basement | Michael Falzon | Sydney | 22 November 2006 |
| Up Close and Musical | Kookaburra | Sydney | 4 August 2007 |
| Gala Concert | Kookaburra | Melbourne | 8 September 2008 |
| ASO on Broadway | Adelaide Symphony Orchestra | Festival Theatre Adelaide | 7 March 2009 |
| West End's Sunday Best Australia's Fire & Flood Benefit | Tuckerbox British Red Cross | London | 29 March 2009 |
| Michael Falzon at Chinatown Shanghai | | Chinatown Shanghai | 30 July 2010 |
| Hats Off! | OZ Showbiz Cares/Equity Fights Aids (OSCEFA) | Sydney | 21 February 2011 |
| Hats Off! | OZ Showbiz Cares/Equity Fights Aids (OSCEFA) | Melbourne | 28 August 2011 |
| Rob Guest Endowment Concert as part of the cast of Rock of Ages | ANZ Trustees Foundation | Melbourne | 10 October 2011 |
| Capella Under the Stars with Macy Gray | Capella Hotel | Singapore | 31 December 2011 |
| Hats Off! To the Freaks | OZ Showbiz Cares/Equity Fights Aids (OSCEFA) | Sydney | 13 February 2012 |
| Wickedly Showstopping | | Dubbo | 13 April 2012 |
| Side by Side by Sondheim | Enda Markey The White Ribbon Foundation | Sydney | 20 April 2012 |
| Twisted Broadway | Benge Group | Sydney | 2 July 2012 |
| Michael Falzon and Trio | Sydney Musical Theatre Cabaret Festival | Sydney | 31 August 2012 |
| Side by Side by Sondheim | Enda Markey | Canberra | 21–22 September 2012 |
| Sunday in the Apartment | Australian Business UK | Soho | 30 September 2012 |
| Michael Falzon Plugged In | | Slide, Sydney | 17 October 2012 |
| LTN: Light The Night | Leukaemia research | Sydney | 22 October 2012 |
| Side by Side by Sondheim | Enda Markey | Geelong Performing Arts Centre | 5–9 November 2012 |
| Premiers Concert: Live From Studio A – A Celebration of Australian Music | Paul Venables / NSW State Government NSW | Sydney Entertainment Centre | 18–19 March 2013 |
| TSO Goes To Broadway (with Trisha Crowe and Guy Noble) | The Tasmanian Symphony Orchestra | Hobart and Launceston | 20 and 22 June 2013 |
| Twisted Broadway | Benge Group | Sydney | 19 August 2013 |
| Concert For Knowlesy | | Slide, Sydney | 26 August 2013 |
| Sydney Opera House 40th Birthday Concert (as part of the Wharf Revue) | | Sydney Opera House | 27 October 2013 |
| LTN: Light the Night (as part of the cast of Atomic) | Leukaemia research | Sydney | 28 October 2013 |
| The Greatest Hits of Queen (with Sydney Symphony Orchestra) | North Street Music and Good Egg Creative | Sydney Opera House | 7–8 February 2014 |
| The Music of Queen (with Perth Symphony Orchestra) | North Street Music | Joondalup Resort; Perth Convention and Exhibition Centre; and Mandurah Performing Arts Centre | 13–15 February 2014 |
| Painted From Memory | Good Egg Creative, Asia Theatricals and City Recital Hall | City Recital Hall, Sydney, New South Wales | 24 September 2014 |
| Adelaide Christmas Proms (with Rachael Beck) | Adelaide Festival Centre and Sportsmed SA | Adelaide Festival Centre | 12–13 December 2014 |
| Premier's Seniors Week Gala Concert – Viva Las Vegas | NSW State Government | Qantas Credit Union Arena | 17–18 March 2015 |
| The Music of James Bond with Kate Ceberano, conducted by Guy Noble | West Australian Symphony Orchestra | Perth Concert Hall | 10–11 April 2015 |
| Painted From Memory | Good Egg Creative, Asia Theatricals et al | QPAC, Brisbane; Adelaide Cabaret Festival; Hayes Theatre, Sydney; Melbourne Recital Centre | 10 June 2015; 12–13 June 2015; 18–20 June 2015; 2 July 2015 |
| Strictly Gershwin with Rachael Beck, Alexandra Flood, Luke Kennedy, Queensland Symphony Orchestra | Queensland Ballet | QPAC, Brisbane | 27 May – 4 June 2016 |
| The Music of Queen:Rock and Symphonic Spectacular | Asia Theatricals, Good Egg Creative and Andrew Wyke | Sydney Opera House; Hamer Hall, Melbourne | 18–19 January 2017; 21 January 2017 |
| The Music of James Bond with Kate Ceberano, conducted by Guy Noble | City of Joondalup West Australian Symphony Orchestra | Joondalup Resort | 16 February 2017 |

== Producer ==
As part of corporate entertainment company SMA Productions and then as managing director of Good Egg Creative, Falzon has been involved in the creation of many internationally successful acts, including The Rat Packs Back and String Diva. Falzon became founding director of Good Egg Creative LTD, in 2009, after selling his interest in SMA Productions (Australia and UK).

Good Egg Creative currently operates in both Australia and the UK, and has been involved in The Music of Queen: Rock and Symphonic Spectacular, in Perth and Sydney, with return performances at the Sydney Opera House and The Arts Centre Melbourne in January 2017. With Asia Theatrical, Falzon and Good Egg Creative produced Swing on This for the Adelaide Cabaret Festival. as well as Painted From Memory in conjunction with City Recital Hall and Asia Theatricals. In 2015, Good Egg Creative co-produced Kurt for Hayes Theatre Cabaret Festival, starring Justin Burford and focusing on the music of Kurt Cobain.

== Other performances ==
=== Television ===
- In January 2013, Falzon filmed a six-part sitcom for Ben Elton and BBC1, entitled The Wright Way (originally titled Slings and Arrows) which aired in late April/May of that year. He was cast in the role of Kyle, an Australian fitness trainer and partner of the title character's ex-wife (played by Kacey Ainsworth.)
  - Conkers Bonkers – S1 Ep2, aired 30 April 2013
  - Lethal Swing Back – S1 Ep3, aired 7 May 2013
  - Curbing the Kerb – S1 Ep5, aired 21 May 2013
  - The Deadly Receptacle – S1 Ep6, aired 28 May 2013
- As part of the cast of We Will Rock You, Falzon performed on RTÉ's The Late Late Show with Dr Brian May and Roger Taylor, Friday, 15 January 2010 in Ireland.
- He was reported to be in contention to host The Singing Bee, the position eventually going to Joey Fatone
- He was cast in the guest role of Jose De Sousa for three episodes in the penultimate season of long running Australian drama Blue Heelers.
  - "Too Close" – season 12, episode 37, aired 19 October 2005
  - "Promises, Promises" – season 12, episode 38, aired 26 October 2005
  - "Slaying the Demons" – season 12, episode 39, aired 2 November 2005
- As part of the cast of We Will Rock You, Falzon performed at the opening of the Australian Rules Football Grand Final, 2003 at the (approx) 90,000 person capacity MCG, and aired nationally on the 10 Network Australia.
- He has performed for Carols by Candlelight in Melbourne, Sydney and Brisbane as well as The Good Friday Appeal in Melbourne.
- Falzon appeared as part of Swing on This on Channel 9 Gold Telethon in 2015, an annual fundraising event for Sydney Children's Hospital, and in 2016 at the similar Good Friday Appeal fundraiser for The Royal Children's Hospital in Melbourne. The latter event was televised on Channel 7.
- Swing on This, including new member Rob Mills, performed at Carols in the Domain, an event televised live on channel 7 and with a live audience estimated at 80,000 people.

=== Film ===
- Jeff Wayne's Musical Version of The War of the Worlds – The New Generation Alive! On Stage, filmed at London's O2 Arena on 15 December 2012. Cinematic release of the performance commenced in the UK in April 2013 before opening in Australia, Bosnia and Herzegovina, Croatia, Hungary, Latvia, Lithuania, Malta, Netherlands and New Zealand.
- Ned, Ocean Pictures/Ned Productions, 2002
- Computer Boy, Cobweb Films, 2000

== Recordings ==
- Atomic (The New Rock Musical), in the role of Leo Szilard for Dreamingful Productions, released January 2016

Little Fire
The Force That Lights The Stars
A Risk You Take
Where Is Home
One Day
Greater Battle
The Atom Bomb Is Here 1945
Only Numbers
What I tell Myself

- Jeff Wayne's Musical Version of The War of the Worlds – The New Generation Alive! On Stage filmed at London's O2 Arena on 15 December 2012. Released in the UK on 25 November 2013, rolling out across the US and Australia later that week.
- I Dreamed A Dream: The Hit Songs of Broadway with Amanda Harrison; Trisha Crowe; Lucy Maunder; Jacqui Dark; Toni Lamond; Andy Conaghan and the Tasmanian Symphony Orchestra released on 21 June 2013 through ABC Classics

Stars; Les Misérables
All I Ask of You; The Phantom of the Opera with Trisha Crowe
Empty Chairs at Empty Tables; Les Misérables
Bring Him Home; Les Misérables

- Michael Falzon EP (Falzon/Kempster/Hosford/ Stace/Field, Rockcandy Music and Hyperactive Music, 2007)

Frail
She'll Be There
Signs of Life
Rockstar
Some Days

- Blue Heelers.

Too Close – s12 Ep 37 Aired 19 October 2005
Promises, Promises – S12 Ep 38 Aired 26 October 2005
Slaying The Demons – S12 Ep 39 Aired 2 November 2005

- Ned Ocean Pictures/Ned Productions 2002
- HMS Pinafore Australian & New Zealand Cast Recording 1997
- The Pirates of Penzance Australian Cast Recording 5 November 1994

== Awards and nominations ==
| Award | Category | Production | Role | Year | Result |
|---|---|---|---|---|---|
| Melbourne Underground Film Festival | Best Actor | Computer Boy | Neo | 2000 | Won |
| Mo Awards | Best Performance – Lead Actor (Musical) | We Will Rock You | Galileo Figaro | 2004 | Nominated |
| Helpmann Awards | Best Male Actor in a Musical | We Will Rock You | Galileo Figaro | 2004 | Nominated |
| Green Room Awards | Best Male Artist – Featured Role | Rock of Ages | Stacee Jaxx | 2011 | Nominated |
