= Enda Markey =

Irish-born Australian theatrical producer

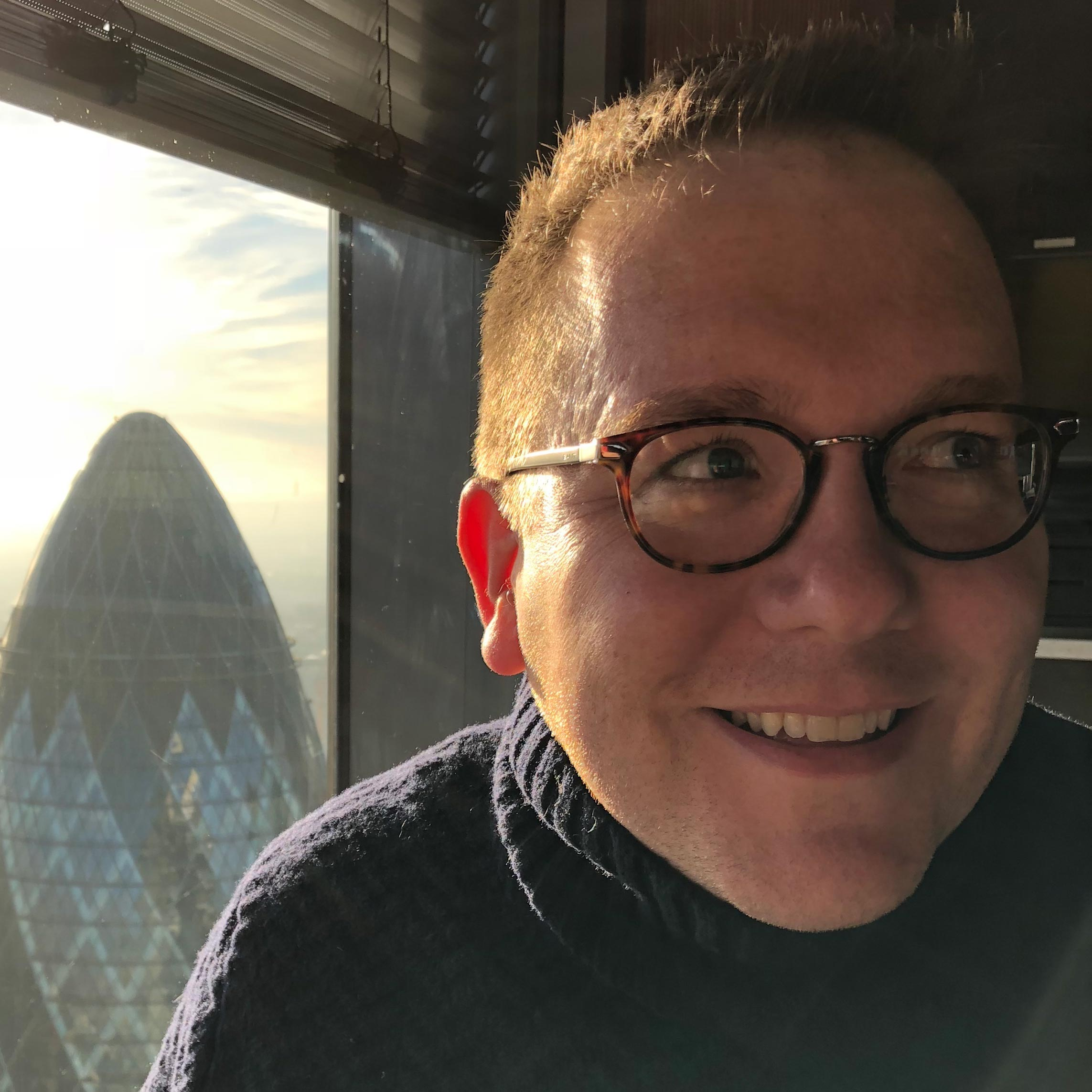
- Markey in 2018
- Born: Dublin, Ireland
- Education: Laine Theatre Arts
- Occupation: Theatrical producer
- Website: endamarkey.com

Enda Markey is an Irish-born, Sydney-based, theatrical producer and former singer and actor. He is the producer of the stage productions Side by Side by Sondheim and the international tour of Boublil and Schonberg's Do You Hear The People Sing?, and the Australian revival of Willy Russell's Blood Brothers.

== Early life and education ==
Enda Markey was born in Dublin, Ireland. He studied musical theatre at Laine Theatre Arts in London on a scholarship.

== Acting career ==
Following his training, Markey played Rick in the London production of A Slice of Saturday Night. He appeared in the Irish premiere of Follies with Lorna Luft, Dave Willetts and Millicent Martin. Follies was followed by an appearance in Side By Side By Sondheim, giving Markey his first starring role. Side By Side was immediately followed by his return to A Slice of Saturday Night in Dublin, recreating the role of Rick.

Theatrical appearances in Australia include The Mangina Monologues in Melbourne and Sydney and the world premiere of Flying Solo with Paula Duncan, Noeline Brown, Jacinta John and Barry Quin, directed by Judy Nunn.

== Producer ==
=== Side By Side By Sondheim ===
In April 2011, Markey produced and starred in a new Australian production of Side By Side By Sondheim, appearing alongside Margi de Ferranti, Amelia Cormack and Jessica Rowe This production toured until November 2012, eventually replacing Cormack with Rachael Beck and then Lucy Maunder; De Ferranti with Geraldine Turner; and Michael Falzon taking over the male role from Markey (who remained as producer).

On 20 April 2012, Markey produced a Gala Concert version of Side By Side by Sondheim featuring Ruthie Henshall at the Theatre Royal. The gala was held to support White Ribbon Australia, a charity which seeks to raise awareness of violence against women. The gala was part of an ongoing tour, which had started in April 2011 at Sydney's Seymour Centre.

The cast, described as "some of the brightest stars in musical theatre" included

- Ruthie Henshall
- Rachael Beck
- Mitchell Butel
- Alinta Chidzey
- Peter Cousens
- Paula Duncan
- Margi de Ferranti
- Lucy Durack
- Michael Falzon
- Virginia Gay
- Erin James
- Melissa Langton
- Ben Lewis
- Stephen Mahy
- Enda Markey
- Elise McCann
- Meow Meow
- Amanda Muggleton
- Lara Mulcahy
- Judy Nunn
- Anna O'Byrne
- Andrew O'Keefe
- Anita Plateris
- Shaun Rennie
- Jessica Rowe
- Garry Scale
- Lyn Shakespeare
- Geraldine Turner
- Bruce Venables
- Belinda Wollaston

=== Do You Hear The People Sing? ===
Enda Markey Presents Do You Hear The People Sing? premiered at Shanghai Grand Theatre 27 November until 1 December 2013. Markey, together with Alain Boublil and Claude-Michel Schönberg presented a fundraising performance of the show at Resorts World Manila starring Lea Salonga, David Harris and Marie Zamora with Filipino performers making guest appearances. A tenth anniversary concert in Manila starred Abigail Adriano, Nigel Huckle, Bradley Jaden and Amy Manford and took place in August 2024.

Do You Hear The People Sing? continued its tour at Taipei International Convention Centre starring Michael Ball, David Harris, Amanda Harrison, Ana Marina and Jennifer Paz. In 2022, an Australian production toured to Sydney Opera House and Arts Centre Melbourne.

The cast for the Australian tour were:

- Michael Ball
- John Owen-Jones
- Rachel Tucker
- Bobby Fox
- David Harris
- Sooha Kim
- Suzie Mathers
- Marie Zamora

Previous versions of the show have included:

- Michael Ball
- Lea Salonga or Jennifer Paz
- Amanda Harrison or Rachel Tucker
- David Harris or Bradley Jaden
- Marie Zamora or Ana Marina

On 28 July 2024, Patrick Wilson, Skylar Astin, Emily Bautista, Jon Jon Briones, Nikki Renee Daniels, Rachel Tucker and Marie Zamora headlined a one-off concert at the Hollywood Bowl.

Do You Hear The People Sing? features the work of Alain Boublil and Claude-Michel Schönberg including music from Les Misérables, Miss Saigon, Martin Guerre, The Pirate Queen and La Revolution Francaise.

=== Blood Brothers ===
In February 2015, Enda Markey presented Blood Brothers at the Hayes Theatre in Sydney, starring Helen Dallimore, Bobby Fox, Blake Bowden, and Michael Cormick. Helen Dallimore was nominated for a Helpmann Awards and won a Glugs Award for her performance. The production played a limited season in Melbourne.

=== Defying Gravity: the songs of Stephen Schwartz ===
In February 2016, Enda Markey presented Broadway Stars Sutton Foster, Aaron Tveit and Betty Buckley together with Joanna Ampil, Helen Dallimore and David Harris in a concert celebrating the work of Broadway composer Stephen Schwartz at Theatre Royal.

In October 2026, Markey produced the international premiere of Defying Gravity at the Kölner Philharmonie in Cologne, in collaboration with the WDR Funkhausorchester. Conducted by Guy Simpson the two concerts featured Thomas Hohler, Harriet Jones, Milica Jovanović, Roberta Valentini and Anton Zetterholm. Stephen Schwartz attended the performance on 9 October. The performance on 10 October was also livestreamed by WDR.

=== Bobby Fox: The Irish Boy ===
In June 2019, Enda Markey presented the world premiere of Bobby Fox: The Irish Boy at Sydney Opera House before a short tour which included the Adelaide Cabaret Festival.

=== Ruthie Henshall - Live & Intimate ===
In June 2019, Ruthie Henshall commenced her first tour of Australia in "Live & Intimate" which included performances at Sydney Opera House, Queensland Performing Arts Centre and the Adelaide Cabaret Festival. The concerts were met with unanimous praise from critics.

=== Anna O'Byrne - Becoming Eliza ===
In June 2022, Anna O'Byrne - Becoming Eliza received its world premiere at Sydney Opera House. In Becoming Eliza, Anna O’Byrne reflects on her experience creating the role of Eliza Doolittle in the Australian production of My Fair Lady, which was directed by Julie Andrews in 2016. O'Byrne shared stories about working intimately with Andrews, as well as the lessons she learned from both Dame Julie and Eliza. The performance was critically praised and will tour into 2024.

=== Carousel - A Concert ===
In May 2024, it was announced that Enda Markey would produce Rodgers and Hammerstein's Carousel in concert, starring Anna O'Byrne as Julie Jordan, Marina Prior as Nettie Fowler and Danny Whitehead as Billy Bigelow. The cast also included Blake Bowden as Enoch Snow, Andy Conaghan as Jigger Craigin and Kerrie Anne Greenland as Carrie Pipperidge. The concert production was presented at Melbourne's Princess Theatre and was highly praised by critics.
