= Lucy Maunder =

Australian cabaret and theatre performer

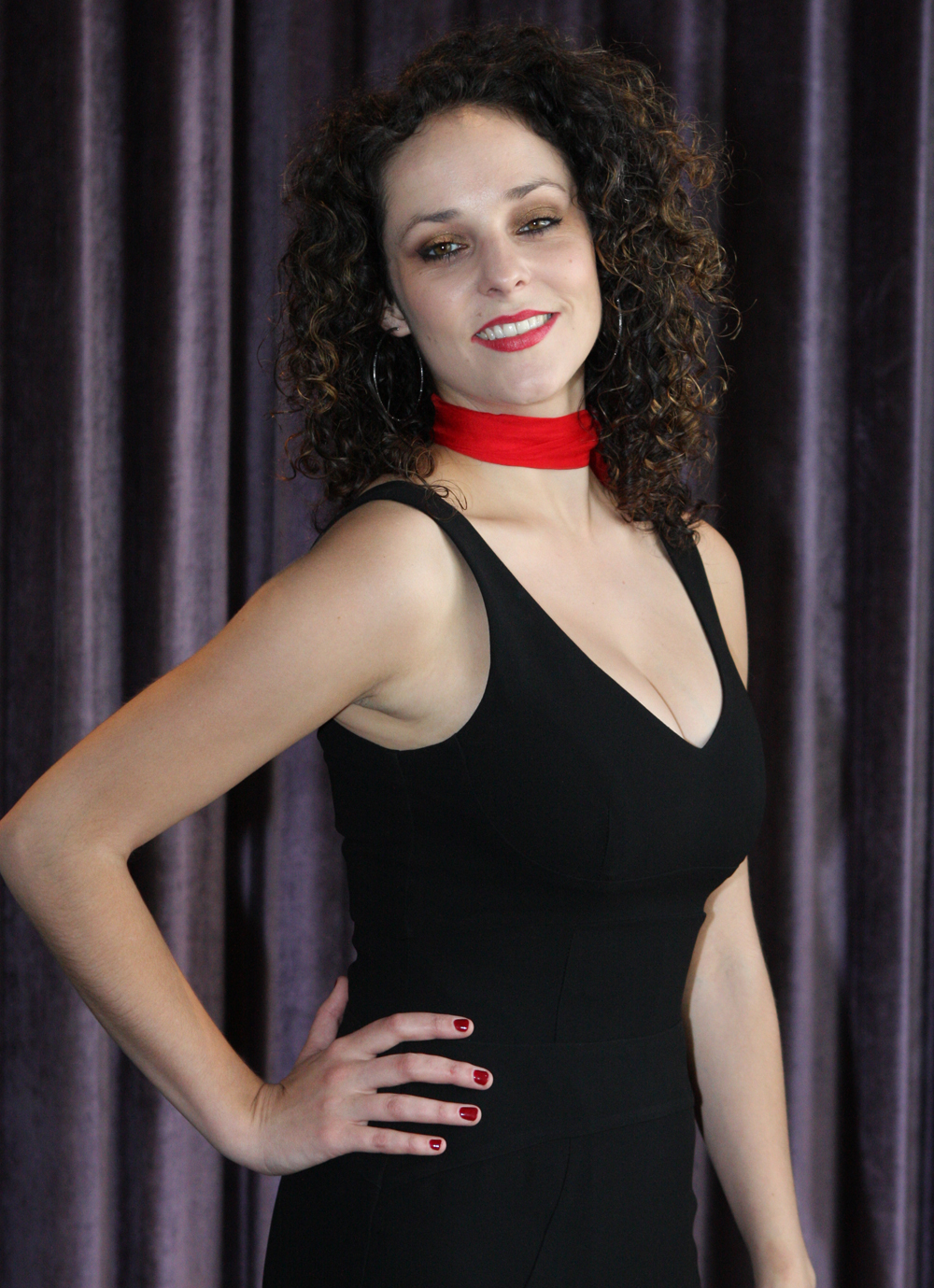
- Maunder in 2013

Background information
- Born: Australia
- Genre: Musical theatre
- Occupations: Singer, actor
- Website: lucymaunder.com.au

Lucy Maunder is an Australian cabaret and theatre performer. She originated the role of Lara in the Australian premiere of Doctor Zhivago in 2011 opposite Anthony Warlow, and toured with her own cabaret Songs in the Key of Black in 2013, releasing an album with the same name. Also in 2013, Maunder toured with the national touring company of Grease playing the role of Rizzo. In 2021-22, she starred as the adult Alison Bechdel in the Sydney Theatre Company and Melbourne Theatre Company's co-production of Fun Home.

== Early life and education ==
Lucy Maunder, the daughter of stage director, Stuart Maunder, moved to England when she was five while her father was resident director of the Royal Opera House. Her mother is singer Anne-Maree McDonald.

After an initial desire to become a dancer, Maunder commenced singing at the age of fourteen. Maunder attended North Sydney Girls High School, completed her HSC in 2003, attaining a distinction in drama. where she played Nellie Forbush in the school's production of South Pacific.

Maunder graduated from Western Australian Academy of Performing Arts (WAAPA) with a Bachelor in Music Theatre. In an interview with The Age, Maunder mentioned WAAPA teachers Jenny Lynnd and John Milson as having a profound impact on her. During this period she became close friends with Stephen Mahy, with whom she would go on to co-star in Grease.

== Career ==
=== Musical theatre ===
Maunder played the lead role of Lara in the premiere of Doctor Zhivago at the Lyric Theatre, Sydney on 19 February 2011 with Anthony Warlow as Yurii Zhivago, Taneel Van Zyl as Tonia and Martin Crewes as Pasha. The production was directed by Des McAnuff. A cast album was planned with two songs by Maunder and Warlow being released in 2011. Doctor Zhivago ran from 19 February until 3 April 2011 in Sydney, before travelling to Melbourne in April until 29 May. From there it went to Brisbane for a limited run from 6–31 July, however, its popularity with Brisbane audiences saw the Queensland season extended to 14 August.

Maunder performed in Elegies for Angels, Punks and Raging Queens as part of the Sydney Mardi Gras Festival. The song cycle was a collection of free verse poems and songs inspired by stories from the Project AIDS Memorial Quilt.

Maunder has also appeared in reasons to be pretty for Darlinghurst Theatre, as well as two staged readings for Neglected Musicals: Lucky Stiff in November 2012 and It's A Bird, It's A Plane, It's Superman in October 2014. She played Janet in The Rocky Horror Picture Show with Richard O'Brien in New Zealand. Her roles have also included Anne in A Little Night Music, which was directed by her father, Stuart Maunder.

In the Sydney Theatre Company co-production with the Victorian Opera of Threepenny Opera, directed by Michael Kantor, Maunder played Polly Peachum, opposite Eddie Perfect as Macheath. This production ran from 4–24 September 2011.

In September 2013, Maunder was cast opposite Stephen Mahy (Kenickie) as Rizzo in the John Frost production of Grease for Brisbane, Sydney, and Melbourne. The production also starred Rob Mills, Gretel Scarlett, Anthony Callea, Stephen Mahy, Todd McKenney and Bert Newton as Vince Fontaine.

Throughout 2013, Maunder starred opposite James Millar in Nancye Hayes' production of Noël and Gertie, a poignant take on the close relationship between Noël Coward and Gertrude Lawrence, including excerpts from several of his famous plays. The musical received glowing reviews in the local press as it travelled throughout New South Wales, Victoria, and South Australia. Maunder received the 2013 Colleen Clifford Memorial Award for Best Actor in Music Theatre at the Glug Awards in Sydney in January 2014 for her performance.

During July 2014, Victorian Opera cast Maunder in the role of Cinderella for Stephen Sondheim's Into the Woods. Directed by her father, Stuart Maunder, Lucy was applauded in Melbourne tabloids and both she and Stuart were nominated in their respective categories, Best Female Actor in a Supporting Role in a Musical for Lucy, and Best Direction of a Musical for Stuart, at the prestigious Helpmann Awards.

In 2015, Maunder starred in Heathers: The Musical with the Hayes Theatre Company as Heather Chandler, in a production directed by Australian musical theatre and cabaret star Trevor Ashley, alongside Jaz Flowers as Veronica Sawyer, Stephen Madsen as Jason "J.D." Dean, Erin Clare as Heather McNamara, Libby Asciak as Heather Duke, Lauren McKenna as Martha Dunnstock/Pauline Fleming, Vincent Hooper as Ram Sweeney/Ram's Dad and Jakob Ambrose as Kurt Kelly/Kurt's Dad.

In 2017, she starred in the role of Miss Honey in the Australian tour of Matilda the Musical, replacing Elise McCann.

In 2020, Maunder starred as Catherine in Pippin at the Sydney Lyric Theatre.

In 2021-22, Maunder starred as the adult Alison Bechdel in the Sydney Theatre Company and Melbourne Theatre Company's co-production of Fun Home.

In 2023-24, Maunder played Roxie Hart in the Australian tour of Chicago and reunited with Anthony Warlow as Billy Flynn.

In 2025-26, she played Jellylorum in the Australian tour of Cats.

=== Concerts ===
In December, 2011, Maunder performed with Donald Cant, Denis Walter, Melinda Schneider, and James Egglestone for the Australian Pops Orchestra 30th Anniversary Party.

Maunder toured her own cabaret show Songs in the Key of Black, based on the songs of Irving Berlin, throughout Australia, including the Adelaide Cabaret Festival, Perth's Morning Melodies at His Majesty's Theatre, and Noosa Longweekend. In 2012 Maunder released an album of the same name featuring songs from the show:

The title was thought up because he wasn't a particularly strong piano player. He only wrote in the key of F-sharp using all the black notes. And it is set in the darkest dive saloons of old New York City and it is a dark and intimate presentation of his songs.

On 20 April 2012, Maunder performed in a gala concert version of Side by Side by Sondheim featuring Ruthie Henshall at the Theatre Royal. The gala was held to support Australia's White Ribbon Foundation, a charity which seeks to raise awareness of violence against women. The cast also included Rachael Beck, Mitchell Butel, Peter Cousens, Lucy Durack, Michael Falzon and Shaun Rennie. Maunder went on to replace Beck in the Geelong leg of the tour.

Maunder returned to Morning Melodies in March, 2013, this time with Anne-Maree McDonald, Stuart Maunder and Alex Rathgeber for Wish Me Luck As You Wave Me Goodbye, which centres around wartime classics including We'll Meet Again and Kiss Me Goodnight Sergeant Major.

On 24 March 2013 Maunder joined her parents, Stuart Maunder and Anne-Maree McDonald, for the musical extravaganza The Sound of Rodgers, a tribute to the work of Richard Rodgers, the composer from the duo Rodgers and Hammerstein. The concert, which featured numbers from South Pacific, The Sound of Music, Oklahoma! and many other musicals from the famous pairing, was held at Riverside Theatres' 25th Anniversary Special Event. The Sound of Rodgers has been performed at many venues throughout the country.

Maunder starred alongside John O'May and Helen Morse in a tribute to French musical act Jacques Brel, Love. War. Death. BREL. for the 2013 Adelaide Cabaret Festival.

In September 2015, Maunder joined Martin Crewes, her former co-star from Doctor Zhivago – A New Musical and the Hungarian opera singer, Judit Molner, for Opera in the Park, an open-air concert held at Broadbeach on the Gold Coast, Queensland. The trio was accompanied by the Gold Coast Youth Orchestra and Gold Coast Youth Choir. The concert featured well-known classics from Broadway shows such as West Side Story, Les Misérables, Phantom of the Opera, Chess, Doctor Zhivago – A New Musical, and many more musical theatre productions, along with classical opera numbers.

== Awards and nominations ==
Year	Award	Category	Production	Role	Result
2011	Helpmann Awards	Best Female Actor in a Musical	Doctor Zhivago	Lara	Nominated
2011	Sydney Theatre Awards	Judith Johnson Award for Best Performance by an Actress in a Musical	Doctor Zhivago	Lara	Nominated
2013	Sydney Theatre Awards	Judith Johnson Award for Best Performance by an Actress in a Musical	Grease	Rizzo	Nominated
2013	Theatre People Pro Choice	Best Supporting Actress	Grease	Rizzo	Nominated
2013	Glugs Theatrical Awards	The Colleen Clifford Memorial Award For Best Actor in Music Theatre (Female)	Noel and Gertie	Gertrude Lawrence	Won
2014	Helpmann Awards	Best Female Actor in a Supporting Role in a Musical	Grease	Rizzo	Nominated
2014	Green Room Awards	Female Actor in a Featured Role (Music Theatre)	Into the Woods	Cinderella	Nominated
2015	Helpmann Awards	Best Female Actor in a Supporting Role in a Musical	Into the Woods	Cinderella	Nominated
2017	Helpmann Awards	Best Female Actor in a Supporting Role in a Musical	Matilda the Musical	Miss Honey	Nominated

== Recordings ==
- Grease Cast Album (as Rizzo)
  - Worse things I Could Do
  - Look at Me I'm Sandra Dee
- I Dreamed A Dream – Hit Songs from Broadway with Michael Falzon; Trisha Crowe; Amanda Harrison; Jacqui Dark; Toni Lamond; Andy Conaghan and the Tasmanian Symphony Orchestra released on 21 June 2013 through ABC Classics.
  - I Dreamed a Dream – Les Misérables
  - On My Own – Les Misérables
- Irving Berlin: Songs in the Key of Black
  - Remember
  - Say It Isn't So
  - What'll I Do/All Alone
  - Yiddisha Nightingale
  - Steppin' Out with My Baby
  - Everybody Step
  - Puttin' On the Ritz
  - Pack Up Your Sins/Top Hat, White Tie and Tails/Cheek to Cheek
  - How Deep Is the Ocean
  - Cheek to Cheek
  - I Love a Piano
  - Blue Skies/Let's Face the Music and Dance
- Doctor Zhivago (duets with Anthony Warlow)
  - Now
  - On the Edge of Time
