= Do You Hear the People Sing? =

Song
- Released: 1980
- Composer: Claude-Michel Schönberg
- Lyricists: Alain Boublil and Jean-Marc Natel (French lyrics); Herbert Kretzmer (English lyrics)

"Do You Hear the People Sing?" ("French: À la volonté du peuple", literally To the will of the people, in the original French version) is one of the principal and most recognisable songs from the 1980 musical Les Misérables. It is sung twice in the opening and closing section of the stage musical.

== Overview ==
The song, composed by Claude-Michel Schönberg (music), Alain Boublil and Jean-Marc Natel (original French lyrics), and Herbert Kretzmer (English lyrics) is first sung in Act I by Enjolras and the other students at the ABC Cafe as they prepare themselves to launch a rebellion in the streets of Paris during the funeral procession of General Jean Maximilien Lamarque. The song is sung again in the finale as the concluding song, or the D.C. al Fine of the musical. This second version, which immediately follows a number by Jean Valjean and others, is sung by the entire cast with revised lyrics, and becomes progressively louder and thunderous with each stanza.

The song is a revolutionary call for people to overcome adversity. The "barricades" referred to in the song are erected by the rebel students in the streets of Paris in the musical's second act. They are to draw the National Guard into combat and ignite a civilian uprising to overthrow the government, but their rebellion eventually fails. In the finale, the song transitions into a solemn hymn in which a world full of peace, freedom, and liberation is anticipated for all mankind.

=== Use in various languages ===
- The original French version of the musical did not end with the full ensemble singing this song; It only later became the musical's finale song when it was revamped for the English-language version. The French version would later be used in a short video referencing the musical to introduce the "Liberté" segment of the opening ceremony of the 2024 Summer Olympics.
- At a special concert marking the tenth anniversary of Les Misérables in 1995, "Do You Hear the People Sing?" was sung by 17 different actors who had played Jean Valjean around the world. Each actor sang a line of the song in his own language. The languages sung were English, French, German, Japanese, Hungarian, Swedish, Polish, Dutch, Norwegian, Czech, Danish, and Icelandic.
- Another adaptation was created by Fabrica, an Egyptian theatrical team, in Egyptian dialect (سامع صوت الجماهير).

=== Use in politics ===
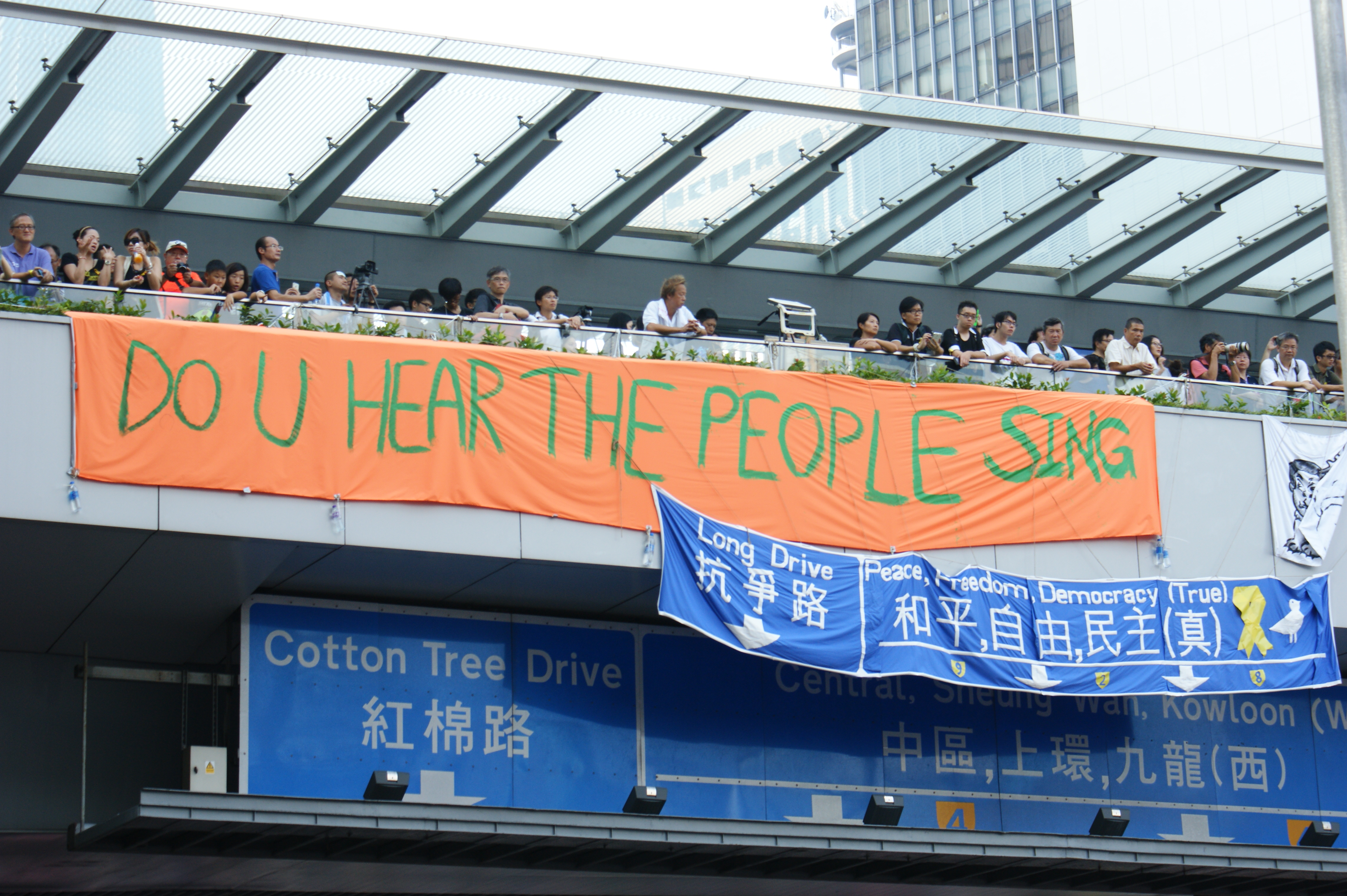
The song's title as a slogan in the 2014 Hong Kong protests.

There are unofficial adaptations of "Do You Hear the People Sing?" in Cantonese and Taiwanese, intended as actual protest songs; better known versions include "Asking Who That Hasn't Spoken Out" (問誰未發聲), written in Cantonese for Occupy Central with Love and Peace, and "Lí Kám Ū Thiann-tio̍h Lán Ê Kua" (你敢有聽着咱的歌) in Taiwanese Hokkien.

The song can be heard in protests in Hong Kong as recently as September 2019, when students sang this song over the national anthem during a secondary school's opening assembly. The song was initially removed on music platforms including QQ Music in mainland China because of its widespread usage in anti-extradition bill protests, while its English version was later removed from those platforms.

Aside from the aforementioned Cantonese and Taiwanese Hokkien adaptations, The Telegraph said that the song "has long chimed with people protesting around the world", adding that it was heard at the 2011 Wisconsin protests, the 2013 protests in Turkey, and a protest against the opening of a McDonald's restaurant in Australia in 2013. It has also been used by anti-TTIP protesters who have interrupted TTIP congresses as flashmobs singing the song.

In 2016, the song was used as a protest song in South Korea's nationwide Park Geun-hye resignation movement.

In 2017, the song was translated into Tagalog by theater artists Vincent de Jesus, Rody Vera, and Joel Saracho, and has been performed at rallies to protest the killing of activists and drug suspects under the administration of Philippine president Rodrigo Duterte, and again following the 2022 Philippine presidential election.

On 16 August 2020, the song was used as a protest song on Thai Version in 2020–2021 Thai protests against the government of Prime Minister Prayut Chan-o-cha at the Democracy Monument.

In September 2020, a number of MSLU students in Minsk, Belarus, were detained after performing the song in the lobby of their educational institution. The students were protesting after president Alexander Lukashenko's disputed re-election.

In April 2022, the song was used as a protest song in 2022 Sri Lankan protests against the government of president Gotabaya Rajapaksa.

In April 2022, a clip of the 2012 film version of the song circulated on Twitter in protest of the lockdown during the 2022 Shanghai COVID-19 outbreak. The clip was ultimately blocked by the Chinese government to stop further protest.

In the 2024 South Korean protests over former President Yoon Suk Yeol declaration of martial law in the country, the song was used by various protest groups standing outside of the National Assembly.

On 16 September 2016, during his presidential campaign, Donald Trump used the song in a rally in Miami under the parody title Les Déplorables, a response to Hillary Clinton's controversial "basket of deplorables" label. On 15 November 2022, it was among the songs played before Trump announced his 2024 presidential campaign. On 23 February 2025, it was sung by the U.S. Army Chorus during the Governors Ball at the White House in front of Trump, First Lady Melania Trump and elected officials.

== Concert adaptation ==
Do You Hear The People Sing? is also the title of a concert celebrating the work of Alain Boublil and Claude-Michel Schönberg, creators of Les Misérables, Miss Saigon, Martin Guerre, The Pirate Queen, and La Révolution Française. Conceived by Boublil and Schönberg, it is the only concert officially authorised by the duo and was developed in collaboration with Australian producer Enda Markey.

The concert premiered at the Shanghai Grand Theatre in December 2013, with Michael Ball and Lea Salonga among the original cast. It was subsequently presented in Taipei and Manila, where a 2014 benefit performance raised over AUD $750,000 for Typhoon Yolanda relief efforts.

In 2022, it was staged at Hamer Hall in Melbourne and the Sydney Opera House, featuring an international cast including Michael Ball, John Owen-Jones, Rachel Tucker, David Harris, Sooha Kim, Marie Zamora, Bobby Fox, and Suzie Mathers.

The concert played at the Hollywood Bowl in Los Angeles in 2024, featuring Patrick Wilson, Skylar Astin, Emily Bautista, and Nikki Renée Daniels.
