= Trisha Crowe =

Australian Classical Pop soprano

- Born: Sydney, Australia
- Occupation: Singer
- Instrument: Classical pop soprano

Trisha Alexandra Crowe is an Australian classical pop soprano. She has achieved success as a solo guest artist in concerts with Australian symphony orchestras and in musical theatre.

== Biography ==
Classical pop soprano, Trisha Crowe, blends the technique and tone of classical music with the songs and performance skills of a modern pop diva.

From the age of four, Crowe took dancing and acting lessons appearing in many concerts and plays. After seeing the London production of Phantom of the Opera, she started singing lessons with opera singer Rita Hunter and her husband John Thomas. She completed a Bachelor of Music (Hons), studying voice with Rita Hunter and her husband John Darnley-Thomas and a Bachelor of Arts (Performance).

Perhaps the most satisfying times in her career have been when singing with orchestras throughout Australia. It was conductor Guy Noble who first asked her to step onto the Sydney Opera House Concert Hall stage and sing with the Sydney Symphony. She has sung with the Sydney Symphony on a number of occasions including Songs From The Movies (2008).

Equally important in her life is her involvement in charity work and music therapy programs including the Light the Night (Leukemia Foundation); Hats Off (Equity Fights AIDS); Day of Difference (Sophie Delezio Foundation); Youth Insearch; Red Cross Charity Ball and together with the Sydney Symphony and MBF, she performs annually for the Children's Hospital, Westmead, and at the Powerhouse Museum for the mentally and physically disabled, Royal Alexandra Hospital for Children.

== Career ==
- Her singing has led to many travels throughout the world from her first professional engagement, Masterpiece – The Music of Andrew Lloyd Webber (for the President of China in the Great Hall of the People, Beijing, and Shanghai) Great Hall of the People; to Regent's Park in London, performing Shakespeare's Cymbeline, Twelfth Night and the musical H.M.S. Pinafore; and in Australia, Cameron Mackintosh's Oliver!.
- Crowe created the role of Bridie O'Malley for the premiere of Eureka! which also starred Ian Stenlake, Rachael Beck, Amanda Muggleton and Michael Cormick, and was directed by Gale Edwards.
- Along with Todd McKenney, Judi Connelli, Chloe Dallimore and Michael Falzon, Crowe appeared at the Sydney Opera House for Showstoppers, supporting the Sydney Symphony conducted by Guy Noble.
- Crowe played the dual roles of Yvonne and Naomi Eisen in Stephen Sondheim's Sunday in the Park with George (2007, Q Theatre).
- In 2007, Crowe played Kathy in Kookaburra – The National Musical Theatre Company's production of Company directed by Gale Edwards starring David Campbell as Bobby and featuring Simon Burke.
- Songs from the Movies with the Sydney Symphony with Crowe, Kate Ceberano, Todd McKenney and Anthony Callea featured songs from Titanic, Singin' in the Rain, Toy Story, E.T., The Mission and Strictly Ballroom, and played at the Sydney Opera House for two nights, 7–8 May 2008.
- Crowe joined British actor Barrie Ingham as well as Australians Peter Cousens, Andrew Tighe, Katrina Retallick in August 2008 for The Noel Coward Letters, at Everest Theatre, in Sydneys Seymour Centre.
- Crowe played for the Olivia Newton-John and Friends Charity Gala (ONJ Cancer and Wellness Centre Appeal) in 2008.
- Crowe appeared as Nellie Collins in Adam Guettel and Tina Landau's Floyd Collins (Meredith Shaw Pty Ltd)., performing alongside Queenie van der Zandt, Peter Cousens and Michael Falzon for a one night only concert production on 3 May 2010.
- Crowe appeared again with Sydney Symphony Orchestra for Best of Broadway (2010). Also featured were Rhonda Burchmore, Todd McKenney and David Hobson.
- In 2011, Crowe toured with The Music of Andrew Lloyd Webber in Australia, New Zealand and Asia. She performed the soprano roles including Love Never Dies and Phantom of the Opera sung by Christine Daaé, and also from Requiem "Pie Jesu".
- Crowe performed with the Tasmanian Symphony Orchestra in June 2013 for TSO goes to Broadway with Michael Falzon and conductor Guy Noble.

== Recording ==
In 2001, she performed in the televised Andrew Lloyd Webber tribute concert Masterpiece: Live From the Great Hall of the People, in Beijing, together Elaine Paige, Tony Vincent and others. This production which was recorded for CD and DVD release in 2002.

She joined Michael Falzon and the Tasmanian Symphony Orchestra, as well as Amanda Harrison, Lucy Maunder, Andy Conaghan, Jacqui Dark and others to record I Dreamed A Dream: The Hit Songs Of Broadway for ABC Classics, released on 21 June 2013, in which she sang:

- All I Ask of You (The Phantom of the Opera) with Michael Falzon
- Over the Rainbow (The Wizard of Oz)
- Chitty Chitty Bang Bang (Chitty Chitty Bang Bang) with Andy Conaghan
- My Favourite Things (The Sound of Music)
- Supercalifragilisticexpialidocious (Mary Poppins)
- Tonight (West Side Story)
