= Jacqueline Dark =

Australian operatic mezzo-soprano (1967/1968–2023)

- Dark, c. 2007
- Born: 1967 or 1968; Ballarat, Victoria, Australia
- Died: 3 October 2023 (aged 55); Sydney, Australia
- Other name: Jacqueline Moran
- Occupation: Operatic mezzo-soprano
- Organizations: Opera Australia
- Awards: Green Room Awards; 13th Helpmann Awards
- Website: jacquelinedark.com

Jacqueline Lisa Dark (also Jacqueline Moran; 1967 or 1968 – 3 October 2023) was an Australian operatic mezzo-soprano who appeared mainly with Australian companies, for a while as a member of Opera Australia. She was known for her voice in leading roles, including world premieres, but also for her stage presence and "a unique sense of comic timing".

Dark was awarded a Green Room Award for performing as Donna Elvira in Mozart's Don Giovanni in 2011, and a 2013 Helpmann Awards for Herodias in Salome, among others. Active also in music theatre and cabaret, she toured Australia and New Zealand in 2015 as Mother Abbess in The Sound of Music, and a reviewer wrote: "She embodies the firm but caring mother and her towering, glorious voice closes the first act with a stunning rendition of 'Climb Ev'ry Mountain'."

== Life and career ==
She was born in Ballarat and attended the University of Ballarat from 1986 to 1988, receiving a Bachelor of Science (Physics) and a Graduate Diploma of Education in 1989, and worked teaching in Ballarat.

Dark trained at the Victorian College of the Arts where she received first class honours in the Graduate Diploma of Opera in 1995.

=== Performance ===
Dark performed with Opera Australia, Victorian State Opera, and was a member of Opera Queensland's Young Artist Program in 2000. At the Vienna State Opera, she performed the roles of Giovanna in Verdi's Rigoletto, Grimgerde in Wagner's Die Walküre, Annina in Verdi's La traviata, Mercedes in Bizet's Carmen, Pastore (shepherd) in Puccini's Tosca, Ines in Verdi's Il trovatore and Countess Ceprano in Rigoletto. She returned to Australia in 2002.

In 2006, she appeared as Dorabella in Mozart's Così fan tutte in the first performance of the Victorian Opera, conducted by Richard Gill. She was already hired by Opera Australia's music director, Richard Hickox. She performed there as Herodias in a new production of Salome by Richard Strauss in 2012. In 2013, she performed the roles of Meg Page in Verdi's Falstaff, Lady Billows in Britten's Albert Herring, and both Fricka and Second Norne in Wagner's Der Ring des Nibelungen. She added Filippyevna in Tchaikovsky's Eugene Onegin, Emilia in Verdi's Otello, and Donna Elvira in Mozart's Don Giovanni to her repertoire in 2014, Amneris in Verdi's Aida and Marcellina in Mozart's Le nozze di Figaro in 2015.

As a freelance singer, she performed as Santuzza in Mascagni's Cavalleria rusticana for the State Opera of South Australia, winning a Curtain Call award in the category Best Female Performance, the soprano title role in the Australian premiere of Rufus Wainwright's Prima Donna, with Kanen Breen as the Journalist, at the 2017 Adelaide Festival, Berenice in Vivaldi's Farnace for the Pinchgut Opera, Mrs Sedley in Britten's Peter Grimes for the Brisbane Festival, the Old Lady in Bernstein's Candide for the New Zealand Opera, Anne in Tom Waits' The Black Rider for the Malthouse Theatre and the Victorian Opera. She returned to Opera Australia as Fricka, Herodias, and as the Countess in Shostakovitch's The Nose in 2018.

Her repertoire also included the roles of the Composer in Ariadne auf Naxos by R. Strauss, the title role in Carmen, the title role and Tisbe in Rossini's La Cenerentola (for which she won another Green Room Award), Suzuki in Puccini's Madama Butterfly, Rosmira in Handel's Partenope, Maurya in Riders to the Sea), Maddalena in Rigoletto, Annina in Der Rosenkavalier by R. Strauss, Pitti-Sing/Katisha in The Mikado, and Mary in Wagner's Der fliegende Holländer.

Dark performed the role of Sally Lowe in the world premiere of Moya Henderson's Lindy and the title role in Tchaikovsky's Iolanthe for Opera Australia, and covered the role of Pearl in the world premiere of Richard Mills' Summer of the Seventeenth Doll.

She collaborated with directors including Neil Armfield, Lindy Hume, Barrie Kosky, Stuart Maunder and Graeme Murphy.

She also performed in music theatre, cabaret, theatre restaurant and on the concert podium. In 2015, she was chosen as Mother Abbess in the national tour of The Sound of Music in Australia and New Zealand. Reviewer Lesley Reed noted in Stage Whispers: "The standout performance comes from Jacqueline Dark as The Mother Abbess. She embodies the firm but caring mother and her towering, glorious voice closes the first act with a stunning rendition of 'Climb Ev'ry Mountain'." She appeared as a soloist with groups including the Melbourne Chorale, the Australian Opera and Ballet Orchestra (concert series), Orchestra Victoria, the Australian National Academy of Music, the Royal Philharmonic Society, and the Queensland Symphony Orchestra. She performed the alto solo in Rossini's Stabat Mater for the West Australian Symphony Orchestra. Dark joined the Tasmanian Symphony Orchestra along with Trisha Crowe, Michael Falzon, Amanda Harrison and others to record I Dreamed a Dream: Hit Songs from Broadway for ABC Classics in 2013.

=== Personal life ===
Dark and "her best friend", Kanen Breen, who is gay, co-parented their son.

Dark died on 3 October 2023, at age 55, having been diagnosed with a rare form of cancer the year before.

== Recordings ==
For Opera Australia and ABC:

- Lindy (2001) – Stringer/Sally Lowe (Henderson)

For Opera Australia and CinemaLive – DVD and CD recordings:

- The Marriage of Figaro (2010) – Marcellina (Mozart)
- The Mikado (2011) – Katisha (Gilbert and Sullivan)
- Don Giovanni (2012) – Donna Elvira (Mozart)
- Der Rosenkavalier (2013) – Annina (Strauss)

For the Tasmanian Symphony Orchestra and ABC Classics (as part of a compilation)

- I Dreamed a Dream – Hit Songs From Broadway (2013) – "Climb Ev'ry Mountain" from The Sound of Music

For Greg Gould's album of duets, 1998 (1998):

- "Frozen" (Madonna)

== Awards ==
Among Dark's major competition achievements are winning the Shell Aria in 1993, Fletcher Jones Memorial Aria and Memorial Aria both in 1994, Ringwood Aria and Geelong Aria both in 1997, Herald Sun Aria in both 1998 and 2000, finalist in McDonald's Operatic Aria in both 1999 and 2000, National Liederfest in 2000.

She achieved a Victorian Theatre Guild Award (Performance of Distinction) in 1989, a Royal Opera House studio scholarship in 1998, the Vienna State Opera Award of 2000, an overseas study grant by the Australian Elizabethan Theatre Trust in 2001, and two Green Room Awards for her role of Tisbe in Opera Australia's La Cenerentola in 2004 and as Donna Elvira in Don Giovanni in 2011. Dark won the award for Best Female Performer in a Supporting Role in an Opera at the 2013 Helpmann Awards for her role as Herodias in Opera Australia's Salome and was nominated in the 2014 Helpmann Award Best in the same category for The Melbourne Ring Cycle.
