= Amanda Harrison =

Australian actress and singer

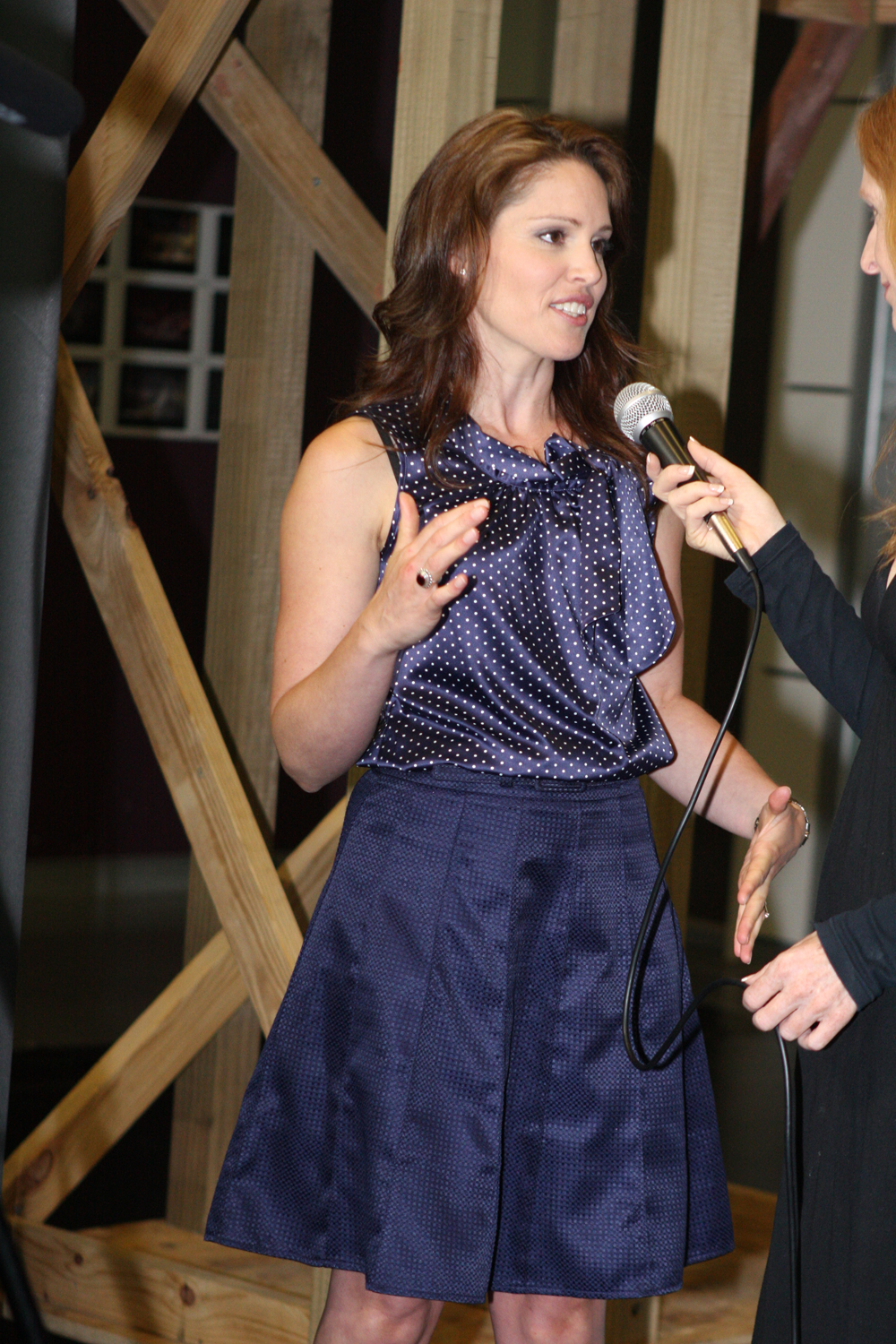
- Amanda Harrison in March 2012

Background information
- Born: 23 July 1974 (age 52); Sydney, New South Wales, Australia
- Genre: Musical Theatre
- Occupations: Singer, actor
- Years active: 1997–present
- Website: amandaharrison.com.au

Amanda Harrison is an Australian actress and singer, known for her roles in Wicked (Elphaba), We Will Rock You ("Meat" understudy in the UK, and “Oz" understudy in Australia), and for originating the role of Paula Pokrifki in the world premiere of An Officer and a Gentleman. She has performed in cabaret several times, including her production Up Close and Reasonably Personal which she performed at Melbourne Cabaret Festival in June 2014 and also David Harris, Michael Ball, Lea Salonga and Marie Zamora for Enda Markey Presents Do You Hear The People Sing at Shanghai Grand Theatre. She voiced characters for Get Ace an animation series released in January 2014. She appeared with Mig Ayesa, Michael Falzon and Carly Thomas-Smith for three performances of The Music of Queen - Rock and Symphonic Spectacular. The concert series began on 7 February 2014, at Sydney Opera House supported by the Sydney Symphony Orchestra before three performances in Perth, Western Australia (Joondalup Resort, Riverside Theatre and Boardwalk Theatre) between 13–15 February.

== Early years ==
Harrison grew up in Bangor and attended Menai High School in Sydney's Sutherland Shire. Harrison attended short courses at The Actors Centre and started the Musical Theatre BA at the Western Australian Academy of Performing Arts (WAAPA) in 1997, but left after only six weeks to take the role of Betty Schaefer in the Original Australian Production of Andrew Lloyd Webber's Sunset Boulevard.

In 1993 Harrison graduated from the Talent Development Project – a program aimed at identifying and supporting students with talent and an interest in a career as an entertainer.

== Theatre career ==
Harrison made her professional debut playing Jenny in Aspects of Love. Other theatrical credits include Sunset Boulevard, Les Misérables, The Journey Girl, and as Liza Minnelli in The Boy from Oz with Todd McKenney. For The Production Company, she has appeared in Mame, She Loves Me, Guys and Dolls, and a Green Room nominated performance of Ado Annie in Oklahoma!

In 2001 Harrison moved to London and made her debut in the West End as Ali in Mamma Mia!

She was an Original London Cast member of the Queen and Ben Elton musical We Will Rock You, starring Tony Vincent and Hannah Jane Fox which opened at the Dominion Theatre on 14 May 2002. Harrison understudied the roles of Scaramouche and Meatloaf. She returned to Australia in 2003 for the Australian Tour, which ran from 7 August 2003 – 13 March 2005 in the role of Oz – short for Ozzy Osbourne (formerly Meatloaf in London) The production also starred Michael Falzon as Galileo, Kate Maree Hoolihan as Scaramouche, and Jason Chong– (later Daniel Fletcher) as Brit. For her portrayal of Oz, Harrison was awarded the 2004 Helpmann Award for Best Female Actor in a Supporting Role in a Musical.

In 2005 Harrison appeared in Leader of the Pack – The Ellie Greenwich Musical playing Ellie Greenwich, an inspirational songwriter of the 1960s. Her performance was nominated for both Helpmann and Green Room Awards.

Taking over the role from Sophie Katinis, Harrison played Ellen in Miss Saigon for the Brisbane and Sydney seasons in 2007. This production featured David Harris as Chris and Laurie Cadevida as Kim.

In 2008, Harrison originated the role of Elphaba in the Australian production of Wicked which opened in Melbourne at the Regent Theatre. Harrison took a leave of absence from the show in November 2009 citing health and family reasons, with the intention of returning in 2010, however by February the leave would be permanent. For playing the role, Harrison was nominated for Green Room, Helpmann and Sydney Theatre Awards for Best Leading Actress in a Musical.

Harrison appeared as Reno Sweeney in Anything Goes for The Production Company. She starred alongside Todd McKenney (Lord Evelyn Oakleigh), Wayne Scott Kermond (Moonface Martin), Christie Whelan (Erma) and Alex Rathgeber (Billy Crocker). Anything Goes ran from 20 – 24 July 2011 at the State Theatre in The Arts Centre, Melbourne, Victoria.

Harrison originated the role of Paula Pokrifki in the World Premiere of An Officer and a Gentleman at the Sydney Lyric Theatre which ran for six weeks in 2012. Harrison was cast opposite Ben Mingay as Zack May, in a production that included Alex Rathgeber, Kate Kendall, Bert Labonte, Bartholomew John and Tara Morice. Despite its short run (18 May 2012 to 1 July 2012) An Officer and A Gentleman was nominated for five Helpmann Awards and five Theatre People Pro Choice Awards including Best Female Actor in a Musical and Best Actress nominations for Harrison.

Harrison stepped in to sing the role of Anita in The Production Company's 2015 West Side Story, when actor Deone Zanotto suddenly came down with laryngitis. Anita's spoken dialogue was provided by assistant director Natalie Gilhome, while Zanotto continued to provide the physical performance.

=== Theatre Credits ===
Production	Role	Company	Location	Date
Aspects of Love	Jenny	Really Useful Productions	Theatre Royal, Sydney, NSW. Comedy Theatre, Melbourne, VIC.	19–29 November 1992
Sunset Boulevard	Betty Schaefer	Really Useful Productions	Regent Theatre, Melbourne, VIC.	26 October 1996 – 6 June 1997
Les Misérables	u/s Eponine	Cameron Mackintosh	Theatre Royal, Sydney, NSW. Princess Theatre, Melbourne, VIC	29 November 1997 – 13 June 1998; 27 June – 25 July 1998
The Journey Girl	Annie	Particular Productions	Athenaeum Theatre Two, Melbourne, VIC.	13 March 1999
Mame	Pegeen Ryan	The Production Company	State Theatre, Melbourne, VIC	1999
The Boy from Oz	Liza Minnelli	Gannon Fox Productions Pty Ltd	Princess Theatre, Melbourne, VIC. Festival Theatre, Adelaide, SA. Burswood Theatre, Perth, WA.	5 January – March 2000
Guys and Dolls	Sarah Brown	The Production Company	State Theatre, Melbourne, VIC.	16 August 2000
Mamma Mia!	Ali	Little Star Services	West End London	19 March 2001 – 16 March 2002
We Will Rock You	u/s Meat	Phil McIntyre Productions	Dominion Theatre, London.	2002
We Will Rock You	Oz	Phil McIntyre, Michael Coppel, Queen, Tribecca	Australia	7 August 2003 – 13 March 2005
Leader of the Pack	Ellie Greenwich	New Theatricals	The Palms at Crown, Southbank, VIC.	12 July – 28 August 2005
Oklahoma!	Ado Annie	The Production Company	State Theatre, Melbourne, VIC.	28 September – 1 October 2005
Boy Band		Ricochet Working Productions	Seymour Downstairs Theatre, Chippendale, NSW,	3–25 March 2006
Miss Saigon	Ellen	Cameron Mackintosh	Brisbane QPAC Lyric Theatre. Sydney Lyric Theatre	20 September – 22 December 2007
Wicked	Elphaba	Wicked Australia	Regent Theatre, Melbourne, VIC. Capitol Theatre, Haymarket, NSW.	2008
Anything Goes	Reno Sweeney	The Production Company, The Arts Centre	State Theatre, Melbourne, VIC	20 – 24 July 2011
An Officer and a Gentleman	Paula	Gordon Frost Organisation	Lyric Theatre, Sydney	18 May-1 July 2012
City of Angels	Donna/Oolie	Life Like Company	Arts Centre Melbourne	2015
The Rocky Horror Show	Magenta/Usherette	GFO	Australian Tour	2018
Evie May	Evie May	Hayes Theatre Co	Hayes Theatre, Potts Point, NSW	2018

== Concert ==
Harrison performed her own cabaret "The Story Goes On" at Statement Lounge Bar, in Sydney from 13 July 2006 to 15 July 2006 describing the show as

"... a little tongue-in-cheek, piss-take of my life," Harrison says. "When I was looking at my life trying to make something for this show I [realised] I've done some really cool things, but in essence I'm still a really big dag."

With Wicked castmate Lucy Durack, she sang the Australian national anthem Advance Australia Fair at the opening of the AFL Grand Final. Harrison performed the song "One Short Day" with fellow Wicked cast members at the 2008 Melbourne Myer Windows display to kick off the Christmas Parade. On 24 December, Harrison and Durack sang at Vision Australia's Annual Carols by Candlelight Concert at the Sydney Meyer Music Bowl.

On 20 January 2009, Harrison performed at Carnegie Hall as part of Australia Week in "Australia Plays Broadway", where she sang "The Wizard and I" from Wicked, "Arthur's Theme" from The Boy From Oz and "I Still Call Australia Home" alongside Olivia Newton-John, Simon Burke and David Campbell.

For the 2010 Rob Guest Endowment Concert, held on 4 October Harrison sang The Story Goes On.

In conjunction with Sharon Millerchip and Caroline O’Connor, Harrison performed a tribute to JC Williamson Award winners Nancye Hayes AM, Toni Lamond AM and Jill Perryman AM MBE at the 2011 Helpmann Awards.

On 13 February 2011 at the Seymour Centre in Sydney and then on 28 August at the National Theatre in Melbourne, Harrison performed for Hats Off! an annual fundraising concert presented by Oz Showbiz Cares/Equity Fights AIDS (OSCEFA), then in its 12th year. Harrison also performed at the 2012 concert in Sydney on 13 February. Hats Off raises money to support Australians living with HIV.

Martin Crewes performed with Harrison at QPAC Spirit of Christmas on 9–10 December 2011.

Harrison performed as a guest at We Will Rock You castmate Michael Falzon's cabaret "Michael Falzon—Plugged In!" in October 2012

Amanda Harrison – Up Close and Reasonably Personal debuted in The Basement, The Arts Centre Gold Coast, on 20 July 2013 for The Arts Centre Gold Coast and Matt Ward Entertainment. This was followed by a performance at Slide in Sydney on 3 October and 17 January 2014, again in Queensland, at The Powerhouse Theatre, Brisbane. It will also make up part of the Melbourne Cabaret Festival in June 2014. Up Close and Reasonably Personal was written by James Millar in collaboration with Harrison and includes songs from a variety of genres.

Harrison joined Michael Ball, Lea Salonga, David Harris and Marie Zamora for Enda Markey Presents Do You Hear The People Sing at Shanghai Grand Theatre from 27 November until 1 December 2013. Harrison is to rejoin Harris and Ball in Taipei to continue the tour. No further dates are as yet available. Do You Hear The People Sing features the work of Alain Boublil and Claude-Michel Schönberg including music from Les Misérables and Miss Saigon.

She appeared at Sydney's annual Carols in the Domain on 21 December where she sang Let It Go from Disney's Frozen.

Harrison, along with Mig Ayesa, Michael Falzon and Carly Thomas-Smith headlined six performances of The Music of Queen – Rock and Symphonic Spectacular. The concert series began on 7 February 2014, at Sydney Opera House with two shows following on 8 February, supported by the Sydney Symphony Orchestra. A further three performances in Perth, Western Australia (Joondalup Resort, Riverside Theatre and Boardwalk Theatre) with the Perth Symphony Orchestra followed between 13 and 15 February. All three of the Opera House performances sold out and the Perth shows were at capacity, including an 8000-person event for the City of Joondalup at the Joondalup Resort.

== Other performances ==
=== Television ===
- In 2000, Harrison performed in Cardiff, Wales as a finalist at the inaugural Voice of Musical Theatre for BBC Radio 2. She was subsequently featured in the BBC documentary about the competition Broadway Babies, which aired throughout the UK and Australia.
- Highlights of her year in London's WWRY included performing at Party in the Park at Hyde Park, and again at Buckingham Palace with Queen members Brian May and Roger Taylor for the Jubilee Celebration, 'Party at the Palace'.
- Amanda's TV appearances in the UK include Parkinson, Children in Need and guest roles in Oscar Charlie, Grange Hill and Casualty, all for the BBC.
- On 27 September 2008, Harrison performed the Australian National Anthem with Wicked co-star Lucy Durack at the 2008 AFL Grand Final.
- As part of the cast of We Will Rock You, Harrison performed at the opening of the Australian Rules Football Grand Final, 2003 at the (approx) 90,000 person capacity MCG, and aired nationally on the 10 Network Australia.
- Harrisons appearance as part of the 2013 annual Carols in the Domain was telecast nationally via the Seven Network on Saturday 21 December 2013.
- She voiced characters for Get Ace, an animation series scheduled for release in January 2014.
- Harrison was asked to be one of The 100 judges in the Channel 7 talent show All Together Now aired in 2018
- Harrison has a recurring role on Neighbours since 2019 as Angela Lane.

=== Recordings ===
- Included in internationally released cast recording of We Will Rock You
- Featured in promotional release of five songs from An Officer and A Gentleman with Ben Mingay, including

Up Where We Belong, performed by Ben Mingay, Amanda Harrison, Kate Kendall and Alex Rathgeber, and
If You Believe in Love, sung by Amanda Harrison.

- I Dreamed A Dream – Hit Songs from Broadway with Michael Falzon; Trisha Crowe; Lucy Maunder; Jacqui Dark; Toni Lamond; Andy Conaghan and the Tasmanian Symphony Orchestra released on 21 June 2013 through ABC Classics.

Memory; Cats
Don’t Cry for Me Argentina; Evita

- Witches with Lucy Durack; Jemma Rix; Helen Dallimore released on ABC Classics 2018.

== Awards and nominations ==
Year	Award	Category	Production	Role	Result
2004	Helpmann Awards	Best Female Actor in a Supporting Role in a Musical	We Will Rock You	Oz	Won
2005	Green Room Awards	Best Leading Actress in a Musical	Leader of the Pack	Ellie Greenwich	Nominated
2005	Green Room Awards	Best Leading Actress in a Musical	Oklahoma	Ado Annie	Nominated
2006	Helpmann Awards	Best Leading Actress in a Musical	Leader of the Pack	Ellie Greenwich	Nominated
2009	Sydney Theatre Awards	Judith Johnson Award for Best Performance by an Actress in a Musical	Wicked	Elphaba	Nominated
2009'	Green Room Awards	Best Leading Actress in a Musical	Wicked	Elphaba	Nominated
2009	Helpmann Awards	Best Female Actor in a Musical	Wicked	Elphaba	Nominated
2012	Helpmann Awards	Best Female Actor in a Musical	An Officer and a Gentleman	Paula Pokrifki	Nominated
2012	Theatre People Pro Choice	Best Actress	An Officer and a Gentleman	Paula Pokrifki	Nominated
