= Side by Side by Sondheim =

Musical revue featuring the songs of Stephen Sondheim

- Windowcard for the original Broadway production
- Music: Stephen Sondheim; Leonard Bernstein; Mary Rodgers; Richard Rodgers; Jule Styne
- Lyrics: Stephen Sondheim
- Book: Revue
- Productions: 1976 West End; 1977 Broadway; 1977 Australia; 1978 U.S. tour 2007 West End revival 2011 Australian revival 2015 London revival

Side by Side by Sondheim is a musical revue featuring the songs of composer Stephen Sondheim. Its title is derived from the song "Side by Side by Side" from Company.

== History ==
The musical had its origins when David Kernan was asked by Cleo Laine and her husband John Dankworth to put together a revue as a benefit for The Stables, a theatre they owned in Wavendon. Kernan contacted director Ned Sherrin and suggested that they do a revue of Sondheim material. Producer Cameron Mackintosh saw the benefit revue, which featured Millicent Martin, Julia McKenzie, Kernan, and Sherrin as the narrator, and agreed to produce it.

In the TV documentary Cameron Mackintosh: The Music Man, Mackintosh admits that he never saw the benefit performance, but Christopher Biggins did, and Mackintosh went on Biggins' recommendation.

== Synopsis ==
The musical is in the form of a revue, with various sections tied together by being from a particular Sondheim musical, or having a common theme, and all of it is tied together by the Narrator. He explains what show the songs are from, and in some cases provides background on why a song was written. He also highlights comparable and contrasting Sondheim themes for the audience. As the cast enters, they sing "Comedy Tonight", and then "Love Is in the Air"; the Narrator explains that the latter song was the original opener for A Funny Thing Happened on the Way to the Forum, but was dropped in favor of the more explicit lyrics of "Comedy Tonight". The Narrator notes that a theme that Sondheim has explored in many of his works is marriage, which introduces the next set of songs. Next are the unknown songs, one cut and one from a television program ("I Remember"). The medley from Company follows, and Act One closes with Follies, with the Narrator pointing out the different musical styles Sondheim has used in these songs, such as Vaudeville ("Buddy's Blues"). The female trio sing "You Could Drive a Person Crazy" as the act ends.

== Songs ==
Songs included have varied from production to production; the following is the song list from the original Broadway production.

Act I

- "Comedy Tonight" - A Funny Thing Happened on the Way to the Forum
- "Love Is in the Air" - dropped from A Funny Thing Happened on the Way to the Forum
- "If Momma Was Married" (music by Jule Styne) - Gypsy: A Musical Fable
- "You Must Meet My Wife" - A Little Night Music
- "The Little Things You Do Together" - Company
- "Getting Married Today" - Company
- "I Remember" - Evening Primrose
- "Can That Boy Foxtrot" - dropped from Follies
- "Company" - Company
- "Another Hundred People" - Company
- "Barcelona" - Company
- "Marry Me a Little" - dropped from Company
- "I Never Do Anything Twice" - The Seven-Per-Cent Solution
- "Bring on the Girls" - Follies
- "Ah, Paree!" - Follies
- "Buddy's Blues" - Follies
- "Broadway Baby" - Follies
- "You Could Drive a Person Crazy" - Company

Act II

- "Everybody Says Don't" - Anyone Can Whistle
- "Anyone Can Whistle" - Anyone Can Whistle
- "Send in the Clowns" - A Little Night Music
- "We're Gonna Be All Right" (music by Richard Rodgers) - Do I Hear a Waltz?
- "A Boy Like That/I Have a Love" (music by Leonard Bernstein) - West Side Story
- "The Boy From..." (music by Mary Rodgers) - The Mad Show
- "Pretty Lady" - Pacific Overtures
- "You Gotta Get a Gimmick" (music by Jule Styne) - Gypsy: A Musical Fable
- "Losing My Mind" - Follies
- "Could I Leave You?" - Follies
- "I'm Still Here" - Follies
- "Conversation Piece"
- "Side by Side by Side" - Company

== Productions ==
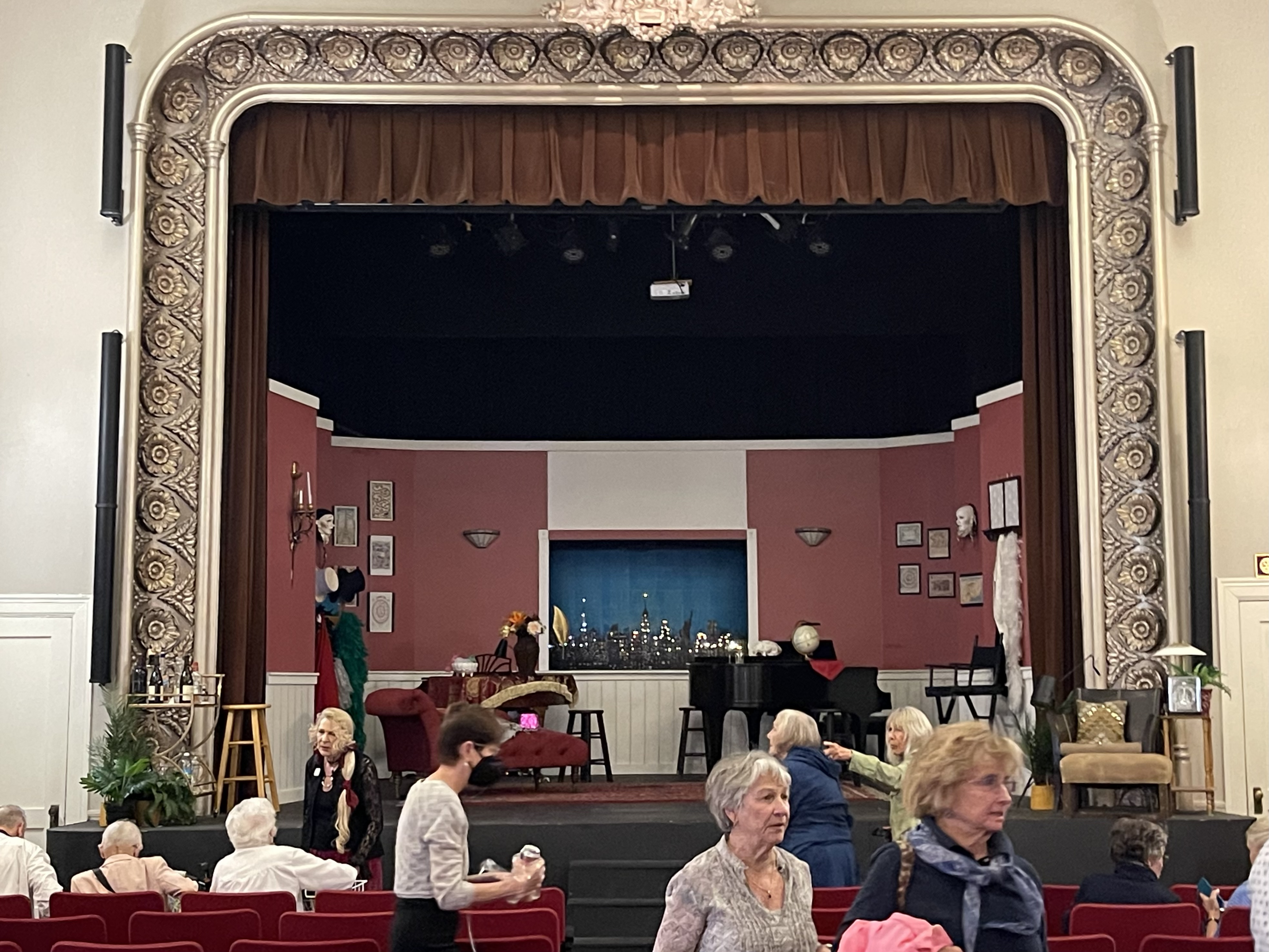
The stage setup for Side by Side by Sondheim at the Sonoma Community Center in Sonoma, California, in 2023.

The revue had its première on May 4, 1976, at London's Mermaid Theatre, where it ran for 59 performances. It subsequently transferred to Wyndham's Theatre, and then the Garrick for a total of 806 performances. Ned Sherrin directed, but Sondheim also worked with the cast and made many suggestions. Millicent Martin, Julia McKenzie, David Kernan, and Sherrin comprised the original cast. The original London cast recording was released as a 2 record set by RCA Red Seal.

Hal Prince produced the Broadway version, and persuaded Actors' Equity Association to allow the original British cast to transfer with the show. The production, again directed by Sherrin, opened on April 18, 1977, at the Music Box Theatre, and later transferred to the now-demolished Morosco Theatre. Lighting design by Ken Billington. Between the two venues, it ran for 384 performances and six previews. It is one of the few shows to have the distinction of its entire cast being nominated for Tony Awards (Best Featured Actor in a Musical and Best Featured Actress in a Musical). A subsequent 1978 U.S. national tour starred Martin, Larry Kert, Barbara Heuman, and Hermione Gingold as the Narrator.

The Australian production opened 21 September 1977 at Canberra Theatre, and subsequently toured to Sydney, Melbourne, and Adelaide. The cast included Jill Perryman, Geraldene Morrow, and Bartholomew John, with Noel Ferrier as the Narrator. John Laws was featured as the Narrator for the Sydney season, as well as on the cast album. The Australian cast recording was released by RCA Records in 1978.

A revised production produced by John Edward Thomas (Little Women and Lizzie the Musical) and directed by Rob Marshall made its debut September 29, 1989, at Playhouse Square's State Theatre in Cleveland, Ohio. The cast featured Paige O'Hara, Marsha Waterbury, and Kurt Peterson, with music direction by Brad Garside.

A London West End revival opened at the Venue Theatre on May 1, 2007, and closed June 23, 2007, after 62 performances and four previews. The cast included Abbie Osman, Alasdair Harvey, and Josie Walker, with rotating narrators. The musical was directed by Hannah Chissick, with musical staging by Adam Cooper.

=== International ===
Numerous international productions have been mounted, including a production in Ireland in 1996, which starred Rebecca Storm, Brendan O'Carroll as the Narrator, Susie Fenwick, Enda Markey, and Sarah-Jane Bourne.

A production at the Seymour Centre in Sydney ran in 2011, and starred Amelia Cormack, Margi De Ferranti, Enda Markey, and Jessica Rowe as the Narrator. This production toured Australia in 2012, with Rachael Beck and then Lucy Maunder replacing Amelia Cormack; Michael Falzon replacing Markey, and Geraldine Turner replacing De Ferranti.

On Friday 20 April 2012, a gala performance of the show took place at Theatre Royal, Sydney. Headlined by Ruthie Henshall and starring an array of Australia's leading musical theatre talent, including Rachael Beck, Geraldine Turner, Peter Cousens, Enda Markey (who also produced), Lucy Durack, Ben Lewis, Stephen Mahy, Amanda Muggleton, Michael Falzon, Virginia Gay and many more.

== Awards and nominations ==
=== Original London production ===
Year	Award	Category	Nominee	Result
1976	Laurence Olivier Award	Best New Musical		Nominated

=== Original Broadway production ===
Year	Award	Category	Nominee	Result
1977	Tony Award	Best Musical		Nominated
1977	Tony Award	Best Performance by a Featured Actor in a Musical	David Kernan	Nominated
1977	Tony Award	Best Performance by a Featured Actor in a Musical	Ned Sherrin	Nominated
1977	Tony Award	Best Performance by a Featured Actress in a Musical	Julia McKenzie	Nominated
1977	Tony Award	Best Performance by a Featured Actress in a Musical	Millicent Martin	Nominated
1977	Drama Desk Award	Outstanding Actress in a Musical	Julia McKenzie	Nominated

== See also ==
- Putting It Together
