= Tolosa Park =

Park in Tasmania, Australia

- Location within Hobart
- Type: Regional park
- Location: Glenorchy, Tasmania
- Nearest city: Hobart
- Coordinates: 42°51′07″S 147°15′04″E
- Area: 25 ha (62 acres)
- Created: March 2025
- Operator: Glenorchy City Council
- Status: Open
- Tolosa Dam
- Purpose: Water supply
- Status: Decommissioned
- Opening date: 1890
- Demolition date: 2023
- Owner: Glenorchy City Council
- Operator: TasWater (former)

Dam and spillways
- Type of dam: Earth fill dam
- Impounds: Humphrey Rivulet
- Height: 20 m (66 ft)
- Length: 283 m (928 ft)
- Dam volume: 190×10^{3} m^{3} (6.7×10^{6} cu ft)
- Spillway type: Uncontrolled
- Spillway capacity: 20 m^{3}/s (710 cu ft/s)

Reservoir
- Total capacity: 414 ML (336 acre⋅ft)
- Catchment area: 2 km^{2} (0.77 sq mi)
- Surface area: 8 ha (20 acres)
- Website gcc.tas.gov.au

Tolosa Park is a 25-hectare (62-acre) regional park, located in Glenorchy, Tasmania, Australia, located on the site of a decommissioned embankment dam. The park was opened on 3 March 2025.

== Former dam ==
The former earth-filled dam was built across the Humphrey Rivulet in 1890 for the purposes of supplying potable water for Glenorchy. The facility was used by TasWater until 2017. In September 2023, the Glenorchy City Council issued an A$6.3 million contract to demolish the dam wall and convert the former reservoir into an urban park.

Until its 2023 partial destruction, the dam wall was 240 metres (790 ft) high and 283 metres (928 ft) long. When full, the former reservoir had capacity of 414 megalitres (336 acre⋅ft) and covered just 8 hectares (20 acres), drawn from a small catchment area of 2 square kilometres (0.77 sq mi). The former uncontrolled spillway had a flow capacity of 20 cubic metres per second (710 cu ft/s). The dam was decommissioned between 2016 and 2024.

== Regional park ==
Following the decommissioning of the former dam and other capital works completed during 2023 and 2024, the first stage of the new park was opened to the public on 3 March 2025. The park facilities include:

- play areas – cater to a wide variety of ages and abilities, with accessible equipment
- community areas – such as BBQ areas, hydration stations and fully accessible amenities
- environmental areas – including native landscaping and constructed wetlands
- facilities for young people – including a multi-use games arena and a pump track
- recreational and competitive cycling infrastructure.

A second stage of the park is planned, subject to attracting approximately A$9 million in funding.

Tolosa Park has hosted outdoor concerts, and was the venue for the Tasmanian Symphony Orchestra's Symphony Under the Stars until 2018.

== See also ==
- List of reservoirs and dams in Tasmania
