= Computer Boy =

2000 short film directed by Abe Forsythe

- Directed by: Abe Forsythe
- Release date: 2000

Computer Boy is a 2000 short film by Australian director Abe Forsythe. It is a parody of The Matrix. It gained a cult following after being released over the internet, receiving over 350,000 views on Ifilm. It was filmed in Sydney, Australia, and uses many of the same locations as The Matrix.

It was never fully released, the film had an injunction put against it, forcing them to never really release it fully. The total production cost was rumoured to only have cost $2500.

This is the transcript direct from one of the hosts:

According to Metro, the film stood in stark contrast to high-budget Hollywood productions. Made by an 18-year-old filmmaker from Newtown for approximately $2,500 AUD, the parody resonated with Matrix audiences who recognized local filming locations.

He admits he had to cut a few corners to bring Computer Boy in under budget. Besides writing and directing, he took on the role of Agent Smith, the character played by Hugo Weaving in the original.

"I played him as a mixture of Hugh Grant, Dr. Evil and Sean Connery," says Forsythe.

Morpheus, the mysterious cyber-guerilla played by Laurence Fishburne, is portrayed by Marcus Pointon.

The role of "Neo", played by Michael Falzon in a manner reminiscent of Keanu Reeves's character "Ted" from Bill and Ted's Excellent Adventure earned a Best Actor Award at the Melbourne Underground Film Festival

Not content with paying homage to The Matrix, Forsythe aimed to enhance the original plot as well.

== Cast ==
- Michael Falzon as Neo
- Marcus Pointon as Morpheus
- Simone Chapman as Trinity
- Abe Forsythe as Agent Smith
- Marc Turner as Agent Kowalski
- Brett Garten as Agent Jones
- Daniel Peters as Cypher
- Daniel Tobar as Tank
- Andrew Brittain as Hobo
- Alexander Hazelbrook as Spoon Boy
- Justin Hazelbrook as Colour Book Boy
- Sharyn Winney as Sheet Girl
- Charles Falzon as Chuck
- Ryan Tan as Asian
- Miguel Sanchez as Bob/Oracle/Hobo/Juggler/Koala

== Music ==
Song	Artist(s)	Length	Scene(s)/Details
New Moon	Anders and Matthew Nielson	3:35	Second half of closing credits
Computer Boy	Lance Lenehan	1:03	0:00 to 0:21 – during Morpheus's pep talk with Neo, and Agent Smith's interrogation of Morpheus; 0:22 to 1:03 — oom-pah-esque or polka tune enjoyed by Agent Smith during and after the car chase

New Moon contains an ID3 artist tag of Sinister Sam.

Lenehan's downloadable version contains several incorrect ID3 tags, claiming the title is Computer Suite from Little Boy - Flight And Countdown (1968), an unrelated song Jean-Claude Risset; the ID3v1 comment field contains Copyright (c) Lance Lenehan. It's speculated that these tags were incorrectly generated by some sort of automatic song detection or ID3-labelling software as a result of detecting the phrase "computer boy". The official movie home page at the time contained references to Lenehan's old MP3 repository at mp3.com.

A post from April 27th, 2000 on Usenet newsgroup aus.films states that the film contains "...new music by Lance Lenehan as well as tracks by up and coming bands Sinister Sam and The Stud & Track House Band."
