= Ned (film) =

- Directed by: Abe Forsythe
- Written by: Abe Forsythe
- Produced by: Darryl Robinson
- Starring: Felix Williamson; Abe Forsythe; Damon Herriman; Nick Flint; Joseph Ber
- Narrated by: Drew Forsythe
- Music by: Gerry Hale, Willy Zygier
- Distributed by: Becker Entertainment
- Release date: 22 May 2003 (Australia)
- Running time: 81 minutes
- Country: Australia
- Language: English
- Box office: A$20,000 (Australia)

Ned is a 2003 Australian film, directed by Abe Forsythe. It is satire of Australian outlaw Ned Kelly, and his iconographical status as a "hero."

The film was released in the same year as Ned Kelly, starring Heath Ledger.

In November 2006 on Vega FM host Shaun Micallef called Ned "The funniest Australian film made in the last ten years."

== Cast ==
- Abe Forsythe as Ned Kelly
- Felix Williamson as Sinclair
- Damon Herriman as Steve Hart / Orderly
- Nick Flint as Dan Kelly
- Josef Ber as Joe Byrne
- Jeremy Sims as Mr Kelly
- Caitlin McDougall as Mrs Kelly
- Michala Banas as Muffy
- Emma Lung as Cindy
- Cornelia Frances as Tina
- Christopher Truswell as Nudge
- Ryan Johnson as Henchman Shanahan
- Michael Falzon as Henchman Williams
- Sean Lynch as Henchman Byrne
- Scott Major as Policeman Roy
- Nathaniel Dean as Klan Policeman
- John Batchelor as Shopkeeper
- Andrew Daddo as Doctor
- Drew Forsythe as Narrator

== See also ==
- Cinema of Australia
