= Rachael Beck =

Australian actress

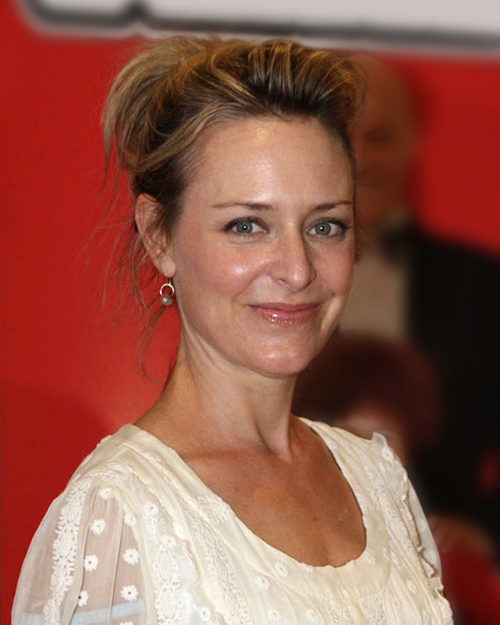
- Rachael Beck, 2011

Background information
- Born: 2 September 1971 (age 55); Sydney, Australia
- Occupations: Musical theatre and television actress-singer
- Years active: 1985–present
- Website: www.rachaelbeck.com.au

Rachael Elizabeth Beck (born 2 September 1971) is an Australian stage and television singer-actress. From 1991 to 1994 Beck had a major role on the popular sitcom, Hey Dad..!, as Samantha Kelly. From 2006 to 2008, Beck appeared on all three seasons of Seven Network's celebrity singing competition It Takes Two, as a singing coach successively for Mark Furze, Ernie Dingo and Mark Wilson. She has appeared in the Australian musical theatre productions of Cats (1985), Disney's Beauty and the Beast (1995–96), Les Misérables (1995–96), The Sound of Music (August 2000 to February 2001), Cabaret, Singing in the Rain and Chitty Chitty Bang Bang. Beck released her first solo album This Girl on 7 March 2014.

== Biography ==
Beck grew up in Alstonville NSW, then Sydney as a teenager, and her father John Beck directed her in school musicals. She has a brother and sister who were both in the music industry. At nine years old, Beck was performing at Eisteddfods where she sang "The Count" and received multiple awards for her musical theatre talent (from Sesame Street). She studied dance under Wendy Kennedy and Shirley Sweeney (OAM). She attended SCECGS Redlands school in Sydney.

Beck was married to Australian actor, Ian Stenlake.

Beck is an ambassador for the Australian Children's Music Foundation, a non-profit organisation which aims to provide musical instruments to children in disadvantaged, remote and indigenous communities in Australia.

== Television ==
Following a guest stint on soap Home and Away in 1990, Rachael was cast in the regular role of Claudia Rossi in the serial Family and Friends.

From 1991 to 1994 she had a major role on the popular sitcom, Hey Dad..!, as Samantha Kelly. Her other television credits include brief stints on Home and Away and as a reporter for Postcards WA.

From 2006 to 2008, Beck appeared on all three seasons of Seven Network's celebrity singing competition It Takes Two. In 2006 she earned third place with Home and Away actor Mark Furze. In 2007 she partnered Ernie Dingo, finishing fourth overall. In 2008 she partnered Mark Wilson from Dancing with the Stars.

In October 2007 Beck appeared on Nine Network's practical joke series, Surprise Surprise Gotcha, where a prank was played on her. In 2020 Beck voiced the character of Azaria Chamberlain in the animated Australian TV show, Regular Old Bogan.

== Theatre ==
At the age of 13 she auditioned for the Sydney premiere of Cats but was considered too young, she took the role of Rumpleteazer for its Melbourne premiere in 1985.

Beck has starred in a number of Australian theatre productions. In 1992 she performed the title role in Young Judy – a one-woman show on the early life of Judy Garland – written by her father, John. She appeared in the Australian stage productions of Disney's Beauty and the Beast (1995–1996) as Belle opposite Hugh Jackman, (the cast recording of which won an ARIA Music Award for best cast album of 1996) Les Misérables as Fantine (1997–98), The Sound of Music (August 2000 to February 2001), taking over from Lisa McCune as Maria for the Perth and Adelaide productions), Cabaret as Sally Bowles, Singing in the Rain as Kathy Selden. In 2006, Beck (as Gladys Hotchkiss) appeared alongside her husband Ian Stenlake (as Sid Sorokin) in a stage production of The Pajama Game at Melbourne's State Theatre.

In September 2007 Beck undertook the role of Beth in the Australia and New Zealand live concert tour of Jeff Wayne's Musical Version of The War of The Worlds – Alive on Stage. She was cast opposite Michael Falzon (Artilleryman) and Shannon Noll (Parson) as well as album alumni Chris Thompson, and Justin Hayward in their original roles. The cast performed with the holographic head of narrator Richard Burton, as well as musical talents of the 48-piece ULLAdubULLA Strings and 10-piece Black Smoke Band, conducted by composer Jeff Wayne.

During January and February 2012, Beck appeared in the role of Claire in Squabbalogic's premiere of Adam Gwon's chamber musical Ordinary Days at Sydney's Darlinghurst Theatre with Michael Falzon (Jason), Erica Lovell (Deb) and Jay James Moody (Warren).

She appeared in Enda Markeys April gala concert Side by Side by Sondheim in Sydney featuring Ruthie Henshall before joining Falzon again in September in the touring company of Side by Side by Sondheim. The touring production, which saw Beck perform in Canberra included Geraldine Turner and Jessica Rowe.

In November she originated the role of Truly Scrumptious in Australia for the national premiere of Chitty Chitty Bang Bang at the Capitol Theatre, Sydney. Beck remained with the tour throughout 2013.

Beck appeared with fellow Ordinary Days co-star Michael Falzon for A Swingin' Christmas Proms 2014 for Adelaide Festival Centre on 12 and 13 December 2014. Also performing were the Adelaide Art Orchestra under the direction of Timothy Sexton. She teamed up with Falzon again in 2016, as well as Alexandra Flood, Luke Kennedy and Queensland Symphony Orchestra for Queensland Ballet's season of Strictly Gershwin.

Theatre
Production	Role	Company	Location	Date
Cats	Rumpleteazer	Really Useful Group	Melbourne	1985
Beauty and The Beast	Belle	Disney		1995–1996
Les Misérables	Fantine			1997–1998
The Sound of Music	Maria		Perth and Adelaide	2000–2001
Singing in the Rain	Kathy Seldon		Sydney	2001
Cabaret	Sally Bowles	IMG Productions Pty Ltd, Barry and Fran Weissler	Australian tour	2003
Eureka! The Musical	Alicia Dunn		Melbourne	2004
The Pajama Game	Gladys	The Production Company	Melbourne	2006
Jeff Wayne's Musical Version of The War of the Worlds	Beth	Jeff Wayne /Michael Chugg	Arena Concert tour Australia, New Zealand	8–29 September 2007
Ordinary Days	Claire	Squabbalogic/Darlinghurst Theatre	Sydney	19 January – 19 February 2012
Side by Side by Sondheim		The White Ribbon Foundation/Enda MarkeyPresents	Sydney	20 April 2012
Side by Side by Sondheim		Enda Markey Presents	Canberra	21–22 September 2012
Chitty Chitty Bang Bang	Truly Scrumptious		Australian tour	2013
Next to Normal	Diana	Black Swan Theatre Company	Perth	November 2015

== Discography ==
The Australian cast album of Beauty and the Beast

- "Belle" with Zachary McCay, Hugh Jackman, Kelly Aykers, Laura Hamilton, Kerry Peters, Ensemble
- "No Matter What" with Ernie Bourne
- "Me" with Hugh Jackman
- "Belle" (Reprise)
- "Home"
- "Something There" with Michael Cormick, Robyn Arthur, Grant Smith, Bert Newton
- "Transformation" with Michael Cormick
- "Beauty and the Beast" (Reprise) – Cast

The Martin King Project with Ian Stenlake; released on 31 December 2010 through Austep Records

- "The Ocean"
- "The Beach"
- "The River"
- "My War"
- "Dream Within a Dream"

Stars of Chitty Chitty Bang Bang Present Hit Songs from the Musical Chitty Chitty Bang Bang with David Hobson and Tasmanian Symphony Orchestra conducted by Guy Noble; released on 14 May 2013 through ABC Music

- "Chitty Chitty Bang Bang"
- "Truly Scrumptious"
- "Hushabye Mountain"

Beck released her first solo album through ABC Music in March 2014. This Girl featured the songs:

- "Send in the Clowns"
- "Only Girl (in the World)"
- "State of the Heart" (duet with Ross Wilson)
- "Running Up That Hill"
- "Sun & Moon" (duet with David Campbell)
- "Love is Everything"
- "Bluebird"
- "One Hand One Heart"
- "Make You Feel My Love"
- "Perfect Day"

My Baby Just Cares For Me with David Hobson; released through ABC Music on 4 April 2014

- "Get Happy"
- "Baby, It's Cold Outside"
- "Almost Like Being in Love"
- "I Got Rhythm"
- "Bewitched, Bothered and Bewildered"
- "You Stepped Out of a Dream"
- "Let's Call the Whole Thing Off / Let's Do It"
- "The Sound of Music medley"
- "Stranger in Paradise"
- "My Baby Just Cares for Me"
- "But Not for Me"
- "Truly Scrumptious"

== Awards and nominations ==
Award	Category	Production	Role	Year	Result
Green Room Awards	Best Female Actor in a Leading Role	Les Misérables	Fantine	1998	Nominated
Green Room Awards	Best Female Actor in a Leading Role	Singing in the Rain	Kathy Seldon	2001	Nominated
Green Room Awards	Best Female Actor in a Leading Role	Chitty Chitty Bang Bang	Truly Scrumptious	2013	Nominated

Preceded by Kelly McCormick	Actress to portray Truly Scrumptious; 2012–2013	Succeeded by Carrie Hope Fletcher
