= Stuart Maunder =

Australian opera director and theatre administrator

Stuart Maunder AM
- Born: 1957 (age 67–68); Boggabri, New South Wales, Australia
- Occupations: Theatre director; Artistic administrator
- Years active: 1981–present

Stuart Lionel Maunder AM (born 1957) is an Australian theatre director, currently appointed as the artistic director of Victorian Opera. He has also directed for Opera Australia, State Opera of South Australia, West Australian Opera, New Zealand Opera and Scottish Opera.

== Biography ==
Born in Sydney but raised in Boggabri, Maunder studied law, but turned to the stage and started his career as a stage manager in 1978 at The Australian Opera before becoming a resident director in 1981. Whilst continuing to direct in Australia, he joined The Royal Opera, London, as a staff director in 1992. In 1999 he was appointed artistic administrator of Opera Australia by Simone Young and then became executive producer from 2004 to 2008.

In 2012, he was made a Member of the Order of Australia (AM) "for service to the performing arts, particularly with Opera Australia, as an artistic director, and as a mentor to emerging artists."

From 2014 until 2018 Maunder was general director of New Zealand Opera, before being appointed artistic director of State Opera of South Australia in 2018.

Maunder was married to pianist and soprano Anne-Maree McDonald; they have a daughter, musical theatre performer Lucy Maunder.

In 2023 Maunder became a patron of Opera Brava, UK.

== Repertoire ==
His opera directing includes Carmen, The Pearl Fishers, Peter Grimes, La fille du régiment, The Cunning Little Vixen, Manon, La bohème, L'Orfeo, The Magic Flute, The Tales of Hoffmann, Orpheus in the Underworld, Tosca, Il signor Bruschino, La scala di seta, Macbeth and Rigoletto. His production of Tosca for New Zealand Opera in 2016 was shown in cinemas nationwide. Maunder directed the first opera production in Australia since COVID-19 restrictions were introduced, Berlioz' Béatrice et Bénédict, conducted by Johannes Fritzsch, at the Queensland Conservatorium.

His musical theatre direction includes Carousel (State Opera of South Australia), Into the Woods, Sunday in the Park with George, Sweeney Todd (Victorian Opera, State Opera of South Australia), Candide (New Zealand Opera), A Little Night Music and My Fair Lady (Opera Australia).

He is also a Gilbert and Sullivan aficionado, having directed Trial by Jury, H.M.S. Pinafore, The Pirates of Penzance, The Mikado, The Gondoliers and Iolanthe. Several of these have been broadcast by ABC Television.
