= Abe Forsythe =

Australian film and television actor, director, writer and producer

- Born: Abraham Forsythe; 26 July 1981 (age 45)
- Occupations: Actor; director; writer; producer
- Spouse: Helen Dallimore (m. 2009; sep. 2013)
- Family: Drew Forsythe (father)

Abraham Forsythe (born 26 July 1981) is an Australian film and television actor, director, writer and producer. He is the son of actor and comedian Drew Forsythe.

== Career ==
He first appeared on the TV series The Miraculous Mellops. He has since appeared as Campbell Todd on the Australian TV series Always Greener, starred in the mini-series Marking Time and starred and directed the 2003 film Ned. He also directed and starred in a parody of The Matrix called Computer Boy. He also starred in the Australian/British television series co-production Tripping Over.

Forsythe has also guest starred in several Australian TV shows, including Blue Heelers, All Saints, Water Rats and Blue Water High.

In 2009, Forsythe wrote and directed the Tropfest short Being Carl Williams. The short won second prize and the Best Comedy award. The 2010 Tropfest saw him win first prize with Shock, a short tribute to radio personality Kyle Sandilands.

In 2012, he played a lead role in one of Australia's most popular TV mini-series ever. Forsythe played John Cornell in the Australian drama Howzat! Kerry Packer's War which was based on Packer's takeover of cricket in 1977, and the establishment of World Series Cricket. Along with directing the second series of Laid (TV series).

In 2016, he wrote and directed the controversial 2005 Cronulla riots inspired black comedy Down Under. Followed in 2019 by Little Monsters a horror/comedy starring Lupita Nyong'o and Josh Gad, which premiered at the Sundance Film Festival.

In November 2019, he was confirmed to direct the next installment of the RoboCop franchise, titled RoboCop Returns.

== Personal life ==
Forsythe was married to actress Helen Dallimore from 2010 to 2012.

== Filmography ==
=== Short film ===
Year	Title	Director	Writer	Producer	Editor
1998	Guided by the Light of the Lord	Yes	Yes	No	Yes
1999	Drunken Rumble Story	Yes	Yes	No	Yes
1999	Navin Wants to Be a Superhero	Yes	Yes	No	Yes
2000	Computer Boy	Yes	Yes	Yes	No
2009	Being Carl Williams	Yes	Yes	Yes	Yes
2010	Shock	Yes	Yes	Yes	Yes
2010	The Talk	Yes	Yes	No	Yes
2012	Prick	Yes	Yes	Yes	Yes

Acting role

Year	Title	Role
2000	Computer Boy	Agent Smith (parody)

=== Feature film ===
Year	Title	Director	Writer	Notes
2003	Ned	Yes	Yes	Role: Ned Kelly
2016	Down Under	Yes	Yes	
2019	Little Monsters	Yes	Yes	Also wrote the songs "Daddy Daddy", "Let's Giggle!" and "Teddy's Lament"

=== Television ===
Year	Title	Director	Writer	Executive Producer	Notes
2012	Laid	Yes	No	No	Series 2
2013	The Elegant Gentleman's; Guide to Knife Fighting	Yes	Yes	No	Episode 2
2013	Mr & Mrs Murder	Yes	No	No	Episodes "The Art of Murder" and "The Course Whisperer"
2014	Soul Mates	No	No	Yes	
2022-2023	Wolf Like Me	Yes	Yes	Yes	Also creator

Acting roles

Year	Title	Role
1991	The Miraculous Mellops	Small Boy
1994	Escape from Jupiter	Kingston
1998	Water Rats	Guest role
	Blue Heelers	Guest role
	All Saints	Guest role
	Blue Water High	Guest role
2001	Always Greener	Campbell Todd
2003	Marking Time	Hal Fleming
2004	Fireflies	Hank Sharp
2005	The Incredible Journey of Mary Bryant	Sam
2006	Tripping Over	Nic Kirkh
2010	Laid	Charlie
2012	Howzat! Kerry Packer's War	John Cornell
2013	House Husbands	Derek
2014	Soul Mates	Casting director
2019	Mr Inbetween	Constable T. Gordon
