= Bobby Fox =

Irish born Australian actor

- Born: Longford, Ireland
- Genre: Musical theatre
- Occupations: Singer, actor, dancer
- Website: www.bobbyfox.com

Bobby Fox is an Irish born Australian actor who originated the role of Franki Valli in the Australian production of Jersey Boys. He is a former 4 times World Irish Dance Champion and toured with dance productions Riverdance, Dancing on Dangerous Ground (principal understudy), To Dance on the Moon (principal dancer) and starred in the revival of Australian musical Hot Shoe Shuffle as Spring. Fox has also had roles in Ladies in Black, Blood Brothers, Mamma Mia!, Leader of the Pack, Dusty – The Original Pop Diva, We Will Rock You, Spamalot and The Production Company's Sweet Charity and Damn Yankees.

Fox released a single with model Miranda Kerr from his debut album The Fantastic Mr Fox. Fox recently performed in concert with fellow musical theatre actor Michael Falzon in a concert showcasing the work of Burt Bacharach and Elvis Costello, featuring the album Painted From Memory.
