= Magaldi =

Magaldi is a surname. Notable people with the surname include:

- Agustín Magaldi (1898–1938), Argentine singer
- Bráz Magaldi (1897–1987), Brazilian sports shooter
- Sábato Magaldi (1927–2016), Brazilian theater critic, playwright, journalist, teacher, essayist, and historian
