= Tasmanian Symphony Orchestra =

Symphony orchestra based in Hobart, Tasmania, Australia

- Short name: TSO
- Founded: 1948
- Location: Hobart, Australia
- Concert hall: Federation Concert Hall
- Principal conductor: Eivind Aadland
- Website: www.tso.com.au

The Tasmanian Symphony Orchestra (TSO) is a symphony orchestra based in Hobart, Tasmania, Australia. It is the smallest of the six orchestras established by the Australian Broadcasting Corporation (ABC).

== History ==
The Tasmanian Symphony Orchestra was established in 1948, and gave its first concert on 25 May in the Hobart Town Hall, conducted by Joseph Post. The soloist was the Tasmanian-born pianist Eileen Joyce, who performed the Piano Concerto in A minor by Edvard Grieg.

From 1973 to 1998 its home was the Odeon Theatre, a renovated former cinema built in 1916 as a replica of New York's Strand Theater. It has now moved to the Federation Concert Hall. In 1998, a 50th anniversary concert was held in the original venue, the Town Hall, under its then chief conductor David Porcelijn.

The TSO was the first Australian orchestra to have its own radio program, Journey into Melody, which was broadcast weekly from 1956 to 1969.

By the late 1960s, there were far more subscribers per head of the state population (1 in 144) than in any of the other capital-city based ABC orchestras. In 1995, when funding cuts threatened to downsize the orchestra from 47 players, a petition was launched by the Friends of the TSO that gathered 35,000 signatures, the largest petition in Tasmanian history.

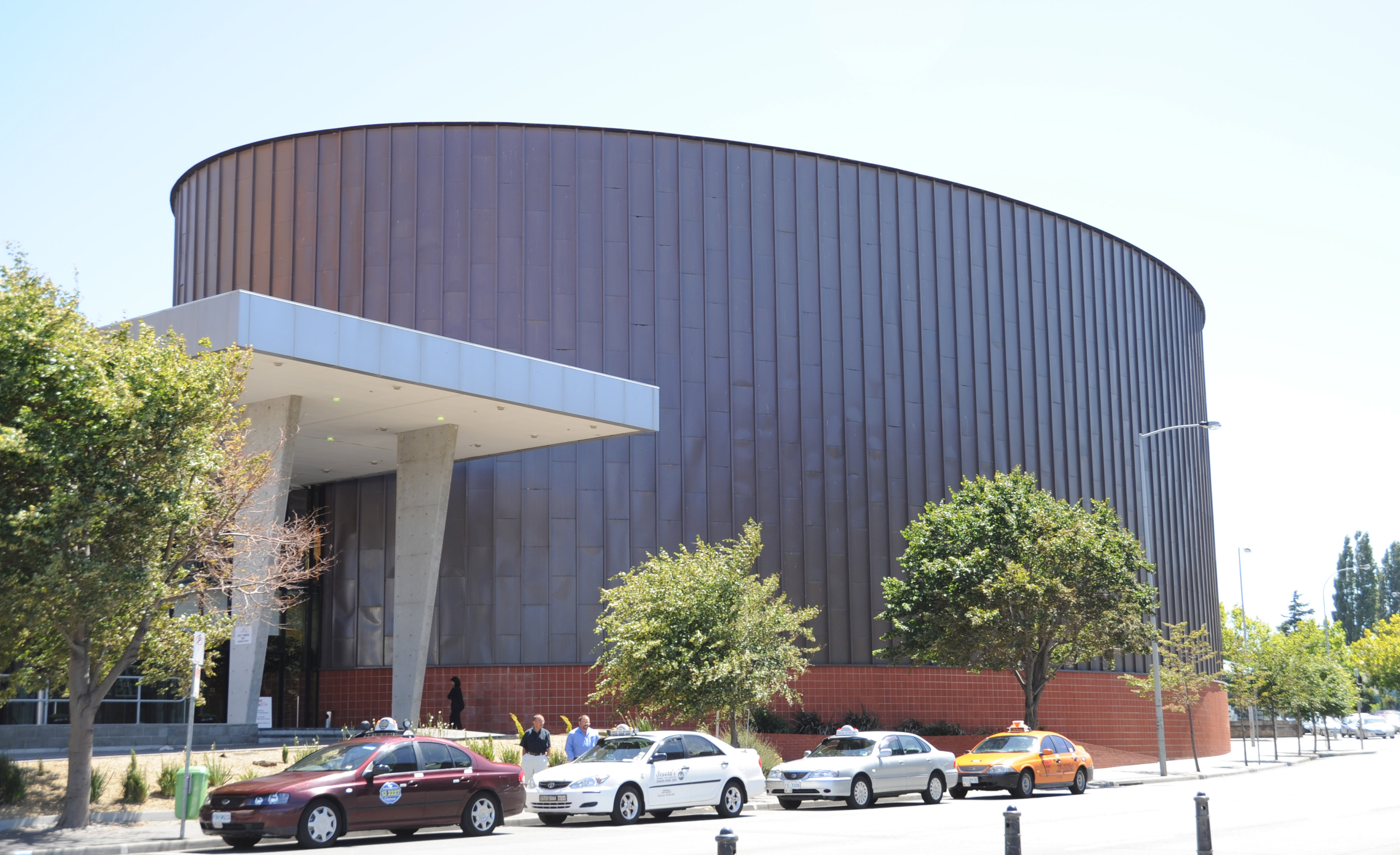
Federation Concert Hall, home of the TSO

In 1998, A Taste of the Tasmanian Symphony Orchestra was published. This was a cookbook that included recipes contributed by members of the orchestra, guest conductors and visiting artists. It sold far more than anticipated, including healthy sales on the Australian mainland.

It receives government funding from both the Tasmanian and Australian governments. The orchestra performs at a number of concert venues both in Tasmania and interstate, including Federation Concert Hall, Tolosa Park in Glenorchy, Princess Theatre and Albert Hall both in Launceston, Burnie Town Hall, Devonport Entertainment Centre, Wrest Point Entertainment Centre in Sandy Bay and the City Recital Hall in Sydney. Major sponsors of the orchestra include Hydro Tasmania, Bass and Equitable Building Society and the Hobart City Council.

Amongst the orchestra's recordings are the complete works of Ignaz Moscheles for piano and orchestra, for which the soloist and conductor was Howard Shelley.

The TSO has toured to Israel, Greece, South Korea, Indonesia, Argentina, United States, Canada, China and Japan as well as widely throughout Australia. It won the 1996 Sidney Myer Performing Arts Award, and a documentary on Maurice Ravel's Mother Goose, which featured the TSO, won the Best Biography Profile at the New York Festival International Television Programming Awards.

With Trisha Crowe, Michael Falzon, Amanda Harrison, Lucy Maunder, Andy Conaghan, Jacqueline Dark and Toni Lamond, the TSO recorded I Dreamed a Dream: The Hit Songs from Broadway for ABC Classics, which was released on 21 June 2013. Falzon and Crowe joined TSO and conductor Guy Noble for TSO Goes to Broadway on 20 (Hobart) and 22 (Launceston) June 2013. to coincide with the launch of the album.

== Chief conductors ==
- Kenneth Murison Bourn (1962)
- Thomas Matthews (1962–1968)
- Thomas Mayer (1970–1974)
- Vanco Cavdarski (1974–1980)
- Barry Tuckwell (1980–1983)
- Geoffrey Lancaster
- Nicholas Braithwaite
- Dobbs Franks (1989–1991)
- David Porcelijn
- Ola Rudner (2001–2003)
- Sebastian Lang-Lessing (2004–2011)
- Marko Letonja (2012–2020)
- Eivind Aadland (2020–present)

== Concertmasters ==
- Lionel Hickey (1948–1962)
- Leon La Gruta
- Wilfred Jones
- William Hennessy
- Barbara Jane Gilby
- Jun Yi Ma
- Emma McGrath

== Discography ==
=== Studio albums ===
List of studio albums, with Australian chart positions
Title	Album details	Peak chart positions
Title	Album details	AUS
Mozart Arias and Orchestral Music (with Teddy Tahu Rhodes)	Released: 19 January 2003; Label: ABC Classics (472 826–2); Format: CD	77

== Awards and nominations ==
=== AIR Awards ===
The Australian Independent Record Awards (commonly known informally as AIR Awards) is an annual awards night to recognise, promote and celebrate the success of Australia's Independent Music sector.

Year	Nominee / work	Award	Result	Ref.
2023	Nightlight	Best Independent Classical Album or EP	Nominated	

=== APRA-AMC Classical Music Awards ===
The APRA-AMC Classical Music Awards are presented annually by Australasian Performing Right Association (APRA) and Australian Music Centre (AMC).

Year	Nominee / work	Award	Result
2005	Concerto for Guitar and Strings (Ross Edwards) – Karin Schaupp, Tasmanian Symphony Orchestra, Richard Mills (conductor)	Orchestral Work of the Year	Won
2005	Australian Music Program 2004 – Tasmanian Symphony Orchestra	Outstanding Contribution by an Organisation	Won
2006	Blue Rags (Ian Munro) – Tasmanian Symphony Orchestra	Orchestral Work of the Year	Nominated
2006	Cello Dreaming Orchestral Version (Peter Sculthorpe) – Tasmanian Symphony Orchestra	Orchestral Work of the Year	Won
2006	Quamby (Peter Sculthorpe) – Tasmanian Symphony Orchestra	Orchestral Work of the Year	Nominated
2007	Tivoli Dances (Graeme Koehne) – Tasmanian Symphony Orchestra, Arvo Volmer (conductor)	Orchestral Work of the Year	Nominated
2007	Australian Composers' School – Tasmanian Symphony Orchestra	Outstanding Contribution to Australian Music in Education	Nominated
2008	Cantilena Pacifica (Richard Meale) – Tasmanian Symphony Orchestra, Erica Kennedy (violin), Richard Mills (conductor)	Orchestral Work of the Year	Nominated
2009	Tivoli Dances (Graeme Koehne) – Tasmanian Symphony Orchestra, Richard Mills (conductor)	Orchestral Work of the Year	Won
2009	Palm Court Suite (Graeme Koehne) – Tasmanian Symphony Orchestra, Richard Mills (conductor)	Orchestral Work of the Year	Nominated
2009	TSO Australian Composers' School – Tasmanian Symphony Orchestra	Outstanding Contribution to Australian Music in Education	Nominated

=== ARIA Music Awards ===
The ARIA Music Awards is an annual awards ceremony that recognises excellence, innovation, and achievement across all genres of Australian music. They commenced in 1987.

Year	Nominee / work	Award	Result	Ref.
1990	Vivaldi: The Four Seasons	Best Classical Album	Won	
1997	Peter Sculthorpe: The Fifth Continent (with David Porcelijn)	Best Classical Album	Nominated	
2002	Symphony of Lullabies (with Sean O'Boyle)	Best Children's Album	Nominated	
2003	Mozart Arias (with Niki Vasilakis & Teddy Tahu Rhodes)	Best Classical Album	Nominated	
2006	Mendelssohn, Bruch, Ravel (with Niki Vasilakis & Sebastian Lang-Lessing)	Best Classical Album	Nominated	
2008	Baroque Guitar Concertos (with Slava Grigoryan & Benjamin Northey)	Best Classical Album	Nominated	
2014	Mozart Arias (with Emma Matthews & Marko Letonja)	Best Classical Album	Nominated	
2018	Into Silence: Pärt, Vasks, Górecki, Pelecis (with Tamara-Anna Cislowska & Johannes Fritzsch)	Best Classical Album	Nominated	
2026	Elena Kats-Chernin: Ancient Letters (Tamara-Anna Cislowska & Johannes Fritzsch)	Best Classical Album	Nominated	

=== National Live Music Awards ===
The National Live Music Awards (NLMAs) commenced in 2016 to recognise contributions to the live music industry in Australia.

Year	Nominee / work	Award	Result	Ref.
2023	Tasmanian Symphony Orchestra	Best Classical Act	Won	

== See also ==
- Symphony Australia
- IHOS Music Theatre and Opera
