= The Production Company =

- Formation: 1999
- Type: Theatre group
- Location: Melbourne, Victoria, Australia
- Artistic director: Ken Mackenzie-Forbes AM
- Website: www.theproductioncompany.com.au

The Production Company was an Australian not-for-profit theatre company that staged a series of usually three musicals at the Arts Centre Melbourne each year.

It was launched in 1999 by Jeanne Pratt AC with the goal of providing "professional opportunities for local artists and to entertain Melbourne audiences with the best shows from Broadway and beyond". The company closed in 2020.

The Production Company specialised in revivals of popular and lesser known musicals with short (two week) rehearsal periods and short runs. It also produced the Australian professional premieres of Thoroughly Modern Millie, Dirty Rotten Scoundrels, Grey Gardens, Nice Work If You Can Get It, Curtains, A Gentleman's Guide to Love and Murder, Lazurus and Ragtime.

Its productions typically featured well-known Australian musical theatre performers such as Caroline O'Connor (Gypsy, Funny Girl), Michael Falzon (Chess), Marina Prior (Guys and Dolls, Kiss Me, Kate), Todd McKenney (The Boy from Oz, La Cage aux Folles), Lucy Durack (Kiss Me, Kate, Thoroughly Modern Millie), Christie Whelan Browne (The Producers, Sugar), Elise McCann (Brigadoon, Oklahoma) and Amanda Harrison (Anything Goes, Oklahoma!).

== Seasons ==
The list of early productions can be found on the AusStage database

=== 1990s ===
1999

- She Loves Me
- Mame
- Funny Girl

=== 2000s ===
2000

- Guys and Dolls
- The Gilbert & Sullivan Show
- Gypsy
- Call Me Madam

2001

- Anything Goes
- Mack and Mabel
- How to Succeed in Business Without Really Trying

2002

- Hello, Dolly!
- The Music Man
- Hair - The American Tribal Love-Rock Musical

2003

- They're Playing Our Song
- South Pacific
- Bye Bye Birdie
- Hair (Sydney season and Melbourne return season)

2004

- Annie Get Your Gun
- Carousel
- High Society

2005

- Oklahoma!
- Sunset Boulevard
- Kiss Me, Kate
- South Pacific (Adelaide season)

2006

- Thoroughly Modern Millie
- Camelot
- The Pajama Game

2007

- Sweet Charity
- Little Me
- 42nd Street

2008

- Follies (State Theatre, 16–20 July)
- Damn Yankees
- Mame

2009

- Crazy for You (State Theatre, 15–19 July)
- Dirty Rotten Scoundrels (State Theatre, 30 September – 4 October)
- The Boyfriend (State Theatre, 12–16 August)

=== 2010s ===
2010

- The King & I (State Theatre, 14–25 July)
- The Boy From Oz (State Theatre, 18–22 August)
- Sugar (State Theatre, 29 September - 3 October)

2011

- The Boy From Oz (State Theatre, 5–16 January; 9–13 February)
- Anything Goes (State Theatre, 20–24 July)
- Kismet (State Theatre, 17–21 August)
- Grey Gardens (Playhouse, 24 November–4 December)

2012

- The Producers (State Theatre, 10–15 July)
- Chess (State Theatre, 21–26 August)
- Promises, Promises (State Theatre, 3–7 October)

2013

- Gypsy (State Theatre, 6–14 July)
- Singin’ in the Rain (State Theatre, 21–25 August)
- The Pirates of Penzance (Hamer Hall, 30 October – 3 November)

2014

- Guys And Dolls (State Theatre, 19–27 July)
- Show Boat (State Theatre, 16–24 August)
- La Cage aux Folles (Playhouse, 21 November – 7 December)

2015

- West Side Story (State Theatre)
- Nice Work If You Can Get It (State Theatre)
- Jerry's Girls (Playhouse)

2016

- Funny Girl (State Theatre)
- Curtains (State Theatre)
- Dusty (Playhouse)

2017

- Hello, Dolly! (Playhouse)
- Jesus Christ Superstar (State Theatre)
- Brigadoon (State Theatre)

2018

- Oklahoma! (State Theatre)
- The Boy from Oz (State Theatre)
- A Gentleman's Guide to Love and Murder (Playhouse, Australian premiere)

2019

- Lazarus (Playhouse, Australian premiere)
- Thoroughly Modern Millie (State Theatre)
- Ragtime (State Theatre, Australian premiere)

== Awards ==
=== Helpmann Awards ===
The Production Company's production of Grey Gardens was nominated for the 2012 Helpmann Award for Best Musical. Performers and creatives who have won Helpmann Awards for their work with The Production Company include Pamela Rabe and Nancye Hayes for Grey Gardens (for Best Female Actor in a Musical and Best Female Actor in a Supporting Role in a Musical, respectively), and David Campbell for Sunset Boulevard (for Best Male Actor in a Musical).

=== Green Room Awards ===
The Production Company's production of Chess received the 2012 Melbourne Green Room Award for Outstanding Musical Production (as well as seven other awards).
