= Amanda Muggleton =

English Australian theatre, television and film actress

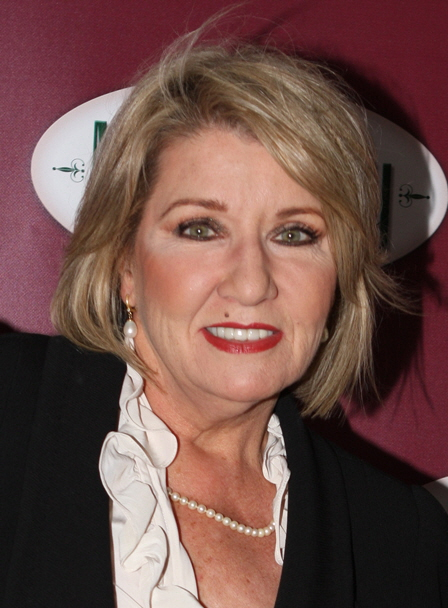
- Muggleton in 2013
- Born: Amanda Lillian Muggleton; 12 October 1951 (age 75); Stepney, London, England
- Education: Sydenham School; Guildhall School of Music and Drama; Royal Academy of Dance, London
- Occupations: Stage, television and film actress
- Years active: 1974–present
- Known for: Prisoner as Chrissie Latham (1979–1983)
- Website: www.amandamuggleton.com.au

Amanda Lillian Muggleton (born 12 October 1951) is an English Australian theatre, television and film actress. She is best known for her supporting television role in soap opera Prisoner as inmate Chrissie Latham, with appearances between 1979 and 1983.

Her stage work in Australia includes the title roles in both Shirley Valentine and Educating Rita, and as Maria Callas in Master Class, for which she won the 2002 Helpmann Award for Best Actress in a Play. She won a second Helpmann Award in 2005, for her role as Mercedes Cortez in the musical Eureka!.

== Early life and education ==
Amanda Lillian Muggleton was born on 12 October 1951 in Stepney, London, England, and emigrated to Australia in 1974.

She attended Sydenham School and left just before taking A-levels to go to drama school. She trained at the Guildhall School of Music and Drama and the Royal Academy of Dance in London.

== Career ==
=== Television and film ===
Muggleton's most widely known television role is perhaps that of Chrissie Latham in the Australian soap opera Prisoner. She also played the lead role of Connie Ryan in short lives soap opera Richmond Hill, and has had guest roles in television series including A Country Practice, Cop Shop, HeadLand, City Homicide as well as British series Hollyoaks and the telemovie Sara Dane. Her film credits include Mad Max, Thirst, Street Hero, Queen of the Road, Mr. Reliable, Feeling Sexy, Idiot Box and Matching Jack.

In 2008, Muggleton's role of Kathy Booth in drama series City Homicide earned her a nomination for the AACTA Award for Best Guest or Supporting Actress in a Television Drama. In 2010, she appeared in two episodes of the ABC comedy series The Librarians. In March 2012, Muggleton went to Queensland for a role in Fatal Honeymoon, a made-for-television film based on the death of Alabama woman Tina Watson on her Great Barrier Reef diving trip in 2003, shot for the American cable channel Lifetime.

In 2016, Muggleton featured in the second episode of Channel 7’s The Secret Daughter, followed by a brief appearance in the UK Channel 4 soap opera Hollyoaks as Dr. Barton, which she filmed in October whilst she was in London performing The Book Club at King's Head Theatre.

In June 2019, it was announced that Muggleton would begin appearing in the Seven Network soap opera Home and Away as recurring character Wendy Shaw, the mother of Ryan ‘Robbo’ Shaw (Jake Ryan). She made her first appearance on 27 June 2019 and her final appearance on 30 July 2020.

=== Theatre ===
Muggleton has appeared with all the state and commercial theatre companies. On stage, her performances with state theatre companies include Privates on Parade, The Matchmaker, The Seagull and Shirley Valentine (with MTC), Master Class, Nicholas Nickleby, The Rise and Fall of Little Voice and Soulmates (with STC), Duet for One, The Winter's Tale, Gigi and We Were Dancing (with QTC), Twelfth Night and Blithe Spirit (with SATC), Educating Rita, Medea and Shirley Valentine (with Hole in the Wall, Perth).

Muggleton's commercial credits include HMS Pinafore and Eureka! (with Essgee), Hello Dolly (with The Production Company), The Book Club and Master Class (with ICA), Annie (with GFO/SEL/Macks), the original Steaming (with Morley, Davis) and Losing Louis (with Ensemble Theatre).

Muggleton has won several very significant awards, for Shirley Valentine and The Rise and Fall of Little Voice (the Norman Kessell Award) and for Miss Hannigan in Annie (the Colleen Clifford Award). For her role as Maria Callas in Master Class, she won both a Green Room Award and a Helpmann Award for Best Actress in a Play. She won a second Helpmann Award for Best Supporting Actress in a Musical for her role as Mercedes Cortez in the Australian musical, Eureka!

In 2003, Muggleton completed a highly successful national tour of The Lion, the Witch and the Wardrobe, playing the White Witch, with Dennis Olsen as The Professor. Together, Muggleton and Olsen also devised and co-produced Marvellous Party!, a production that celebrates the words and music of Noël Coward, and which had two sell-out shows at the Victorian Arts Centre, a highly successful Victorian tour and toured Melbourne, Perth, Mandurah and Canberra, from 2003 to 2004. She also appeared in her own solo cabaret show.

Out of Marvellous Party! came Darling It's Noel, produced by International Concert Attractions and directed by Rodney Fisher at the Sydney Opera House and His Majesty's Theatre, Perth in 2004.

In 2009, Muggleton appeared in the thirtieth anniversary of The Man From Mukinupin for Belvoir Street Theatre, Sydney and in the roles of both Louis and Ethel Reid in The Ruby Sunrise for Ensemble Theatre, Sydney.

In 2010, Muggleton appeared as Bette Davis in the one-woman show Me & Jezebel at Mackay Entertainment Centre. One week after it finished, she began rehearsals for the role of Chris in Calendar Girls, which toured nationally, and took the role of Lillian in Madagascar for Black Swan Theatre Company in Perth.

In 2011, Muggleton started playing multiple roles in Love Loss & What I Wore at the Sydney Opera House alongside Magda Szubanski and Natalie Bassingthwaighte. Subsequently, she played the role of Susan in a one-woman comedy Just the Ticket for Ensemble Theatre, Sydney. After a short break, Muggleton took over the role of Mrs Peachum in The Threepenny Opera alongside Paul Capsis for the Sydney Theatre Company in September 2011, and then headed to Perth, where she played the role of Mrs Johnstone in Blood Brothers, from November to December 2011 – a role that she had longed to play.

In 2013, Muggleton starred in three different theatre productions. First she starred in a revival of Torch Song Trilogy for Gaiety Theatre Presents, from February to March at the Darlinghurst Theatre in Sydney. Following this, she took to the road for a six-month tour of The Book Club, which visited Brisbane, Sydney, Melbourne, Adelaide, Perth and many regional areas. Midway through the tour she took a break to reprise her role in Blood Brothers at Brisbane's Cremorne Theatre, QPAC for two weeks in August. In 2014 she returned to the role of Ms Hannigan in Annie (Sydney) as well as performing the cabaret show The Men Who Got Away – Thank God! in Canberra.

In 2015, Muggleton performed in Boston Marriage at QPAC in February and March and won the 2015 Norman Kessell Memorial Award for Best Actor (female) for her role in The Book Club at the Glug Awards in Sydney.

Muggleton returned to the stage in 2016 to play Velma Von Tussle in Hairspray in Brisbane (April) and Newcastle (July) just before The Book Club returned to Melbourne's Southbank Theatre in July.

In 2017, Muggleton played the role of Helena Rubinstein in Lip Service for Ensemble Theatre in Sydney, and reprised her award-winning role as Maria Callas in Master Class in Perth, which continued in Melbourne in January 2018.

=== Other ===
In 2009, Muggleton and her business partner Bernadette Eichner founded Scene & Heard, a new acting school based in Sydney's Lane Cove. Within its first year, the business became so successful that they had to relocate it to new, bigger premises.

Muggleton is qualified as a speech and drama teacher. She is also a public speaker and can pilot single-engine planes.

== Filmography ==
=== Film ===
Year	Title	Role	Type
1979	Mad Max	Biker's Moll (uncredited)	Feature film
1979	Thirst	Martha	Feature film
1982	A Slice of Life	Eva	Feature film
1984	Street Hero	Miss Reagan	Feature film
1996	Idiot Box	Mum	Feature film
1996	Mr. Reliable	Mrs. Morgan	Feature film
1999	Feeling Sexy	Vicki's Mum	Feature film
2006	Vermin	Esmerelda	Short film
2008	Your Turn	Esther	Short film
2010	Don't Ya Wanna Dance?	The Mother	Short film
2010	Matching Jack	Home Nurse	Feature film

=== Television ===
Year	Title	Role	Type
1975–1976	The Caricacture Theatre		UK series
1975	Panache		UK series
1978; 1982	Cop Shop	Ann Walker / Bikie's girlfriend	TV series, 2 episodes
1979–1983	Prisoner	Chrissie Latham	Supporting role, seasons 1–5 (108 episodes)
1981	Holiday Island	Ruth Faraday	Episode 21: "Public Hero"
1981	Women of the Sun	Secretary	Miniseries, episode 4: "Lo-arna"
1982	Sara Dane	Nell Finnigan	Miniseries, 2 episodes
1983	A Country Practice	Karen Murdoch	Episode: "Truth and Consequences"
1984	Queen of the Road	Gayle O' Reagan	TV film
1984	A Country Practice	Ros Henkle	Episode: "Horse of a Different Colour"
1984	Sweet and Sour	Pat Mason	2 episodes
1987	A Country Practice	Jill Rice	Episode: "Birds of Prey"
1987	Rafferty's Rules		1 episode
1988	Richmond Hill	Connie Ryan	Lead role
1988	Touch the Sun: Peter & Pompey	Miria Malloy	TV film
1997	H.M.S. Pinafore	Little Buttercup	TV film
2006	HeadLand	Geraldine Pye	Season 1, episodes 38 & 44
2007	City Homicide	Cathy Booth	Episode: "Lie Down with Dogs"
2012	Fatal Honeymoon	Glenda Watson	TV film
2013	The Librarians	Rose McConnichie	Season 3, episodes: "Dark Before Dawn", "Pearl of Wisdom"
2016	The Secret Daughter	Connie Di Maria	2 episodes
2016	Hollyoaks	Dr. Barton	1 episode
2019–2021	Home and Away	Wendy Shaw	Recurring role, seasons 32-33
2025	Do Not Watch This Show	Ronda Ringo (voice)	1 episode (Getting Older)

== Theatre ==
Year	Title	Role	Notes
1975	Volte Farce		UK
1976	Cheskoo Raree		UK
1976	Privates on Parade		UK
1977	Zazu and Zercus	Devisor	La Mama, Melbourne
1977	Sadie and Neco		La Mama, Melbourne
1978	Macbeth	Lady Macbeth	
1978	Kennedy's Children		
1978	Love Thy Neighbour	Rita Southwood	Memorial Theatre Ballarat, Theatre Royal, Sydney, Comedy Theatre, Melbourne
1979	Dirty Linen	Maddie	Playbox Theatre, Melbourne
1979	Antigone	Antigone	Playbox Theatre, Melbourne
1979	Zastrozzi	Julia	Pram Factory, Melbourne
1980	Hello and Goodbye		La Mama, Melbourne
1980	Measure for Measure		Monash University, Melbourne
1980	Fefu and Her Friends		Melbourne Athenaeum with MTC
1980	Bremen Coffee	Geesche Gottfried	Melbourne Athenaeum
1980	A Boy for Me, a Girl for You	Margo Le Grand	Melbourne Athenaeum
1980	The Matchmaker	Ermengarde	Melbourne Athenaeum
1980	Privates on Parade	Sylvia Morgan	Melbourne Athenaeum
1981	Female Transport		
1982	Steaming	Josie	Opera Theatre, Adelaide, Seymour Centre, Theatre Royal, Sydney, Comedy Theatre, Melbourne, Canberra Theatre
1983	Female Parts		ANU, Canberra
1983	Education		
1983	Words, Words, Words		
1983–1984	The Life and Adventures of Nicholas Nickleby	Tilda Price	Theatre Royal, Sydney, State Theatre, Melbourne, Festival Theatre, Adelaide with STC
1984	Duet for One	Stephanie Abrahams	SGIO Theatre, Brisbane
1985	Steaming		Seymour Centre, Canberra Theatre
1985	Mothers and Fathers		
1986	Crystal Clear		
1985; 1996	The Secret Diary of Adrian Mole		Melbourne Athenaeum
1987	The Odd Couple		Northside Theatre, Sydney
1989; 1991	Educating Rita	Rita	Phillip St Theatre, Sydney, Subiaco Theatre Centre, Perth
1988–1989	Shirley Valentine	Shirley Valentine	Hole in the Wall Theatre, Perth, Theatre Royal, Hobart
1988–89	Bedroom Farce	Susannah	Twelfth Night Theatre, Brisbane, Glen St Theatre, Sydney, Illawarra Performing Arts Centre, Riverside Theatres, Parramatta, Laycock Street Theatre, Gosford
1989	Stepping Out		
1990	Private Lives		Illawarra Performing Arts Centre, Canberra Theatre, Sydney Opera House, Laycock Street Theatre, Gosford, Twelfth Night Theatre, Brisbane, Gold Coast Arts Centre with STC
1991–1992	Love Letters	Melissa Gardner	
1991–1993	Shirley Valentine	Shirley Valentine	Sydney Opera House, Russell St Theatre, Melbourne, Twelfth Night Theatre, Brisbane, Regal Theatre, Perth, Monash University, Playhouse, Melbourne
1992	Steaming		Adelaide
1993–1994	The Rise and Fall of Little Voice		Wharf Theatre, Sydney, Playhouse Adelaide. Won Norman Kessell Award)
1994	Don't Dress for Dinner		Regal Theatre, Perth, Canberra Theatre, Newcastle Civic Theatre
1994	The Winter's Tale	Paulina	Suncorp Theatre, Brisbane with QTC
1995	Gigi		Suncorp Theatre, Brisbane
1995; 1998	Shirley Valentine	Shirley Valentine	Comedy Theatre, Melbourne with MTC
1996	Master Class	Maria Callas	Playhouse Adelaide
1996	Love Child		Cremorne Theatre, Brisbane
1997	H.M.S. Pinafore	Buttercup	State Theatre, Melbourne, State Theatre, Sydney, Canberra Theatre, Empire Church Theatre, Toowoomba, Gold Coast Arts Centre, Lyric Theatre, Brisbane with Essgee Entertainment
1998	Full Gallop	Diana Vreeland	Marian St Theatre, Sydney
1998	Dangerous Obsession		
1998–1999	A Funny Thing Happened on the Way to the Forum		Essgee Entertainment
1999	Twelfth Night	Maria	Playhouse Adelaide with STCSA
1999	Elegies for Angels, Punks and Raging Queens	Mrs Lusty	Melbourne Athenaeum
1999	The Book Club	Deborah Martin	Playhouse, Melbourne, Glen Street Theatre, Sydney, The Capital, Bendigo
1999; 2016–2018	Master Class	Maria Callas	Perth & Playhouse, Melbourne with STC. Won 2002 Helpmann Award for Best Actress in a Play & Green Room Award
2000	Blithe Spirit	Elvira	Playhouse Adelaide with STCSA
2000	Medea		Hole in the Wall Theatre, Perth
2000	Annie	Miss Hannigan	Lyric Theatre Sydney, Regent Theatre, Melbourne, Lyric Theatre, Brisbane
2001	The Seagull	Arkadina	Hole in the Wall Theatre, Perth, Playhouse Melbourne with MTC
2001–2002	Master Class	Maria Callas	Playhouse Canberra, His Majesty's Theatre, Perth, Playhouse Melbourne, Optus Theatre, South Bank, Gold Coast Arts Centre with STC
2002	Soulmates	Katie Best	Sydney Opera House, Riverside Theatres Parramatta, Playhouse Melbourne, Illawarra Performing Arts Centre, Newcastle Civic Theatre, Playhouse Canberra with STC
2002	Hello Dolly!	Dolly Levi	State Theatre, Melbourne with The Production Company
2003	The Lion, The Witch and the Wardrobe	The White Witch	State Theatre, Melbourne, Festival Theatre, Adelaide, Canberra Theatre, Lyric Theatre, Brisbane
2003	We Were Dancing	Clara Bethel	Playhouse, Brisbane with QTC
2004	The Vagina Monologues		University of Sydney
2004	Darling it's Noel!		Sydney Opera House & His Majesty's Theatre, Perth
2004–05	Marvellous Party!		Dunstan Playhouse, Cremorne Theatre, Brisbane, Teatro Vivaldi Canberra, Victorian Arts Centre, Capers, Melbourne, Hyatt Perth, Edwards Waterfront, Mandurah
2004	Hats Off! to Sondheim		National Theatre, Melbourne
2005	The Hatpin		Seymour Centre, Sydney
2005	Losing Louis	Sheila	Ensemble Theatre, Sydney
2005	Eureka!	Mercedes Cortez	Essgee Entertainment. Won Helpmann Award for Best Female Actor in a Supporting Role in a Musical
2006–07	Love Child	Anna	Playhouse Perth, Melbourne Athenaeum, Riverside Theatres Parramatta & Australian regional tour
2006	Entertaining Mr Sloane	Kath	Fairfax Studio, Melbourne with MTC
2008	The Female of the Species	Germaine Greer	Dunstan Playhouse, Adelaide
2009	The Man from Mukinupin	Mercy Montebello	30th Anniversary production. Belvoir St Theatre, Sydney, Southbank Theatre, Melbourne with MTC
2009	The Ruby Sunrise	Aunt Lois / Ethel Reid	Ensemble Theatre, Sydney
2010	Me & Jezebel	Bette Davis / Elizabeth / John / Christopher / Ol’ Ma / Grace (solo show)	Mackay Entertainment Centre
2010	Calendar Girls	Chris	Lyric Theatre, Brisbane, Theatre Royal Sydney
2010	Madagascar	Lillian	Playhouse Perth with Black Swan State Theatre Company
2010	Love, Loss, and What I Wore	Various roles	Sydney Opera House
2011	Just the Ticket	Susan	Ensemble Theatre, Sydney
2011	The Threepenny Opera	Mrs Peachum	Wharf Theatre, Sydney with STC
2011; 2013	Blood Brothers	Mrs Johnstone	Cremorne Theatre, QPAC, Brisbane & Metcalfe Playhouse, Perth
2011	The Ham Funeral	Mrs Lusty	Odeon Theatre, Adelaide with STCSA
2012	Side by Side by Sondheim		Theatre Royal, Sydney
2013	Torch Song Trilogy	Mrs Beckoff	Darlinghurst Theatre with Gaiety Theatre Presents
2013; 2015	The Book Club	Deborah Martin	National Australian tour & King's Head Theatre, London. Won 2015 Norman Kessell Memorial Award for Best Actor (female)at the Glug Awards
2014	Annie	Miss Hannigan	Riverside Theatres Parramatta. Won Colleen Clifford Award
2014	The Men Who Got Away – Thank God!	Solo show	Canberra
2015	Boston Marriage	Anna	QPAC, Brisbane, Gold Coast Arts Centre, Ipswich Civic Centre, Empire Theatre, Toowoomba & North Qld tour
2016	Hairspray	Velma Von Tussle	Brisbane Convention and Exhibition Centre, Newcastle Entertainment Centre, Adelaide Entertainment Centre, Challenge Stadium Perth
2017	Lip Service	Helena Rubinstein	Ensemble Theatre, Sydney
2019; 2021	Coral Browne: This F***king Lady	Coral Browne	London, UK, Brunswick Ballroom, Melbourne, Twelfth Night Theatre, Brisbane
2023	The Mentor	Amanda Redfern	Theatre Works, Melbourne

== Awards & nominations ==
Year	Work	Award	Category	Result
1993	Amanda Muggleton	Glugs Theatrical Awards	Norman Kessell Memorial Award for Contribution to Theatre	Won
	Shirley Valentine	Glugs Theatrical Awards	Norman Kessell Memorial Award for Best Actor (female)	Won
	The Rise and Fall of Little Voice	Glugs Theatrical Awards	Norman Kessell Memorial Award for Best Actor (female)	Won
2000	Annie	Glugs Theatrical Awards	Colleen Clifford Memorial Award for Outstanding Performance in a Musical or Special Comedy Satire	Won
2002	Master Class	Helpmann Awards	Best Actress in a Play	Won
2002	Master Class	Green Room Awards	Best Actress in a Play	Won
2002	Master Class	Mo Awards		Nominated
2004	The Red Peppers	Mo Awards		Nominated
	Soulmates	Mo Awards		Nominated
2005	Eureka!	Helpmann Awards	Best Supporting Actress in a Musical	Won
2008	City Homicide (S1E3: "Lie Down with Dogs")	AFI Awards	Best Guest or Supporting Actress in a Television Drama	Nominated
2015	The Book Club	Glugs Theatrical Awards	Norman Kessell Memorial Award for Best Actor (female)	Won
