= Deborah Kennedy =

Australian actress (active 1971– )

- Born: Australia
- Education: Hornsby Girls' High School; Sydney University Dramatic Society (SUDS); Pageant Theatre in Education; Nimrod Acting School
- Occupation: Actress
- Years active: 1971–present
- Known for: Yellow Pages TVC
- Notable work: Tim (1979); The Restless Years (1977–1982); A Place to Call Home (2013–2018)

Deborah Kennedy is an Australian character actress recognised for several television and film roles, especially for her appearance in the famous Australian Yellow Pages advertisement with the line "Not happy, Jan!".

== Early life ==
Kennedy was the youngest sibling in her family. She knew she wanted to act from around the age of five, when she was cast as the titular character in a production of The Ugly Duckling. She attended Hornsby Girls' High School, at the same time as actress Jacki Weaver.

After being rejected from Sydney's National Institute of Dramatic Art (NIDA) in 1970, Kennedy joined the newly-formed Community Theatre in Killara (the precursor to Marian Street Theatre), where she undertook her early acting training. After the course was shut down for financial reasons, she appeared in amateur productions for New Theatre and then pretended to be a university architecture student to be accepted into Sydney University Dramatic Society (SUDS). Hoping to secure work in professional productions, she joined Pageant Theatre in Education, before moving to Nimrod Acting School in its founding year in 1975, where she started out as an understudy, while working as a waitress at a restaurant in Milsons Point.

== Career ==
From 1975, Kennedy began performing in productions for Nimrod Theatre Company. She started out as an understudy for productions of Much Ado About Nothing and Richard III, but when the lead actress was let go, Kennedy stepped into the roles of Hero and Lady Anne respectively. She also worked with Belvoir in Sydney, State Theatre Company of South Australia (STCSA) in Adelaide and New Moon Theatre Company in far North Queensland, with plays in her extensive repertoire including Shakespeare’s Macbeth, David Williamson’s Travelling North and Don's Party, and Steve Martin's Picasso at the Lapin Agile.

Kennedy also began acting onscreen in the 1970s, with appearances in Certain Women, Silent Number and Doctor Down Under. She landed her first regular role in soap opera The Restless Years, playing Dr. Helen Ashford from 1977 to 1982. Her film roles of the period included 1979 drama Tim with Mel Gibson and Piper Laurie, 1978 short film Temperament Unsuited with Robyn Nevin. and 1979 sports biopic Dawn! about champion swimmer Dawn Fraser.

In the 1980s, Kennedy had guest roles in soap opera Prisoner and Bellamy before appearing in 1982 big-budget miniseries 1915. She also continued to play supporting roles in feature films, including 1985 drama I Can't Get Started with John Waters and Wendy Hughes, 1985 thriller The Empty Beach and 1990 comedy Death in Brunswick with Sam Neill and Zoe Carides.

Kennedy became a regular cast member of drama series Chances, in 1991, playing nurse Connie Reynolds, until the character was written out of the show as part of a cast revamp. In the 1990s, she also had a recurring part in Police Rescue and roles in series Wildside and Good Guys Bad Guys. She also had ongoing roles voicing characters in two children's programs, Johnson and Friends and Boffins.

In 1994, Kennedy appeared in comedy drama The Sum of Us with Russell Crowe and Jack Thompson, her performance earning her an Australian Film Institute Award nomination for Best Supporting Actress. Her film roles continued with 1996 comedy drama Idiot Box opposite Ben Mendelsohn and Thank God He Met Lizzie (1997) alongside Cate Blanchett, Frances O'Connor and Richard Roxburgh.

Kennedy went on to deliver the famous (in Australia) catch-phrase "Not happy, Jan!" in the oft-quoted TV commercial for the Yellow Pages telephone directory, which first aired in 2000. In the 2000s, her television guest roles included appearances in McLeod's Daughters and Welcher & Welcher. Her film credits during this time included 2000 comedy drama My Mother Frank with Sinéad Cusack and Sam Neill, and 2003 biopic Swimming Upstream with Geoffrey Rush, Judy Davis and Jesse Spencer.

Starting in 2006, Kennedy appeared in a recurring role in long running soap opera Neighbours as Mishka Schneiderova, Lou Carpenter's Russian partner whom he met online. In 2009, Kennedy appeared in adventure comedy film Charlie & Boots with Paul Hogan and Shane Jacobson, and voiced the character of the Whale Queen in animated children's series Sea Princesses, before landing the regular role of Di Sunnington in comedy series The Jesters in 2010. She went on to play guest roles in Dance Academy, Rake and Miss Fisher's Murder Mysteries.

From 2013, Kennedy became a regular cast member in Australian period drama A Place to Call Home, playing the role of local gossip, Doris Collins for six years The following year, she had a recurring guest role in the 2014 first season of the ABC's Janet King. In 2015, she joined the supporting cast of four-part drama miniseries The Principal, playing Val, opposite Alex Dimitriades and Aden Young.

Kennedy took to the stage in 2016, for a touring production of comic farce Fawlty Towers: The Play, playing the deaf Mrs Richards. The show was devised by John Cleese himself, who took three episodes of the original series and re-worked them for the stage. Kennedy's performance saw her nominated for a Glugs Theatrical Award for Most Outstanding Supporting Actress.

In 2018, Kennedy played the role of Myra's mother in Bruce Beresford's Ladies in Black, alongside Julia Ormond, Rachael Taylor and Angourie Rice. After having seen Kennedy in A Place to Call Home, U.S.-based Wonkybot Studios head-hunted her to guest in season three of their superhero podcast series Tara Tremendous in 2020, voicing the dual roles of twins Ms. Fernsby and Mrs. Biddlespach. The following year, the studio had her voice the role of Agatha Dunwick in their teen horror podcast series Origins Unknown.

In 2023, Kennedy appeared in the series Totally Completely Fine alongside Thomasin McKenzie, and The Lost Flowers of Alice Hart with Sigourney Weaver before joining the extended cast for ABC series Return to Paradise in 2024. In 2025, she appeared in LGBTQI+ film Jimpa, playing Katherine opposite Olivia Colman and John Lithgow.

== Personal life ==
Kennedy learned that her great aunt was a touring actress in the U.S. in the 1800s.

== Acting credits ==
=== Film ===
Year	Title	Role	Type	Ref
1979	Temperament Unsuited	Christine	Film short	
1979	Tim	Dawnie Melville	Feature film	
1979	Dawn!		Feature film	
1985	The Empty Beach	Newspaper Librarian	Feature film	
1985	I Can't Get Started	Rose	Feature film	
1987	Kadaicha	Mrs. Millhouse	Feature film	
1988	Grievous Bodily Harm	Madeleine Kovitch	Feature film	
1990	Death in Brunswick	June	Feature film	
1994	The Sum of Us	Joyce Johnson	Feature film	
1994	The Roly Poly Man	Chantal	Feature film	
1994	Night Work		Film short	
1996	Idiot Box	Detective Leanne	Feature film	
1997	Thank God He Met Lizzie	June	Feature film	
1998	Let's Wait	Alex	Film short	
1999	Federation	Louisa Lawson	Feature film	
2000	My Mother Frank	Receptionist	Feature film	
2001	A Matter of Life	Suicidal Sue	Film short	
2001	Jetset	Herself	Feature film	
2002	Wait 'Til Your Father Gets Home		Film short	
2003	Swimming Upstream	Billie	Feature film	
2004	Thunderstruck	Matron of Honour	Feature film	
2009	Closed for Winter	Dorothy	Feature film	
2009	Charlie & Boots	Miles Waitress	Feature film	
2014	Women He's Undressed	Florence Kelly	Feature film documentary	
2018	Ladies in Black	Myra's Mother	Feature film	
2019	Larry Time	Beryl	Film short	
2023	Cold Water	Joy	Film short	
2025	Jimpa	Katherine	Feature film	

=== Television ===
Year	Title	Role	Notes	Ref
1975	McManus MPB	Model	TV movie	
1975	Silent Number		1 episode	
1976	Certain Women			
1979	Doctor Down Under	Sister Fletcher	1 episode	
1977–1982	The Restless Years	Dr. Helen Ashford	618 episodes	
1981	Bellamy		1 episode	
1982	1915	Sharon Kerley	Miniseries, 2 episodes	
1983	Prisoner	Gerri Doogan	2 episodes	
1985; 1987	A Country Practice	Joan Barlow / Maree Perkins	2 episodes	
1987	Willing and Abel		1 episode	
1988	Home and Away	Vet	1 episode	
1988	Mike Willesee's Australians	June Ferguson	TV film series, episode 9: "Betty Cuthbert"	
1988	Rafferty's Rules	Miss Herron	1 episode	
1988	Fields of Fire II	Betty Wilson	Miniseries, 1 episode	
1989	How Wonderful!	Exercise class teacher	TV movie	
1990–1995	Johnson and Friends	Victoria (voice)	32 episodes	
1991	For the Love of Mike	Isabella Rudd	1 episode	
1991	Chances	Connie Reynolds	68 episodes	
1991–1992	Police Rescue	Bronwyn Catteau	4 episodes	
1994	Boffins	Madame Curie	13 episodes	
1996	Naked: Stories of Men	Romono	TV film series, episode 5: "A Fallen Woman"	
1998	Good Guys Bad Guys	Bridget Costello	1 episode	
1998	Wildside	Patricia Wilson	1 episode	
2002	McLeod's Daughters	Cathy Cronin	1 episode	
2003	Welcher & Welcher	Judge	1 episode	
2004	Stiff	Trish	TV movie	
2004	The Brush-Off	Trish	TV movie	
2005	Small Claims: White Wedding	Trudy Duffy	TV film series, 1 episode	
2006	Have a Go TV	Presenter	13 episodes	
2006	RAN: Remote Area Nurse	Departing RAN	3 episodes	
2006	Neighbours	Mishka Schneiderova	23 episodes	
2007	Bastard Boys	Gwen Coombs	Miniseries, 2 episodes	
2009	Law and Disorder: Allan Kessing - The Reluctant Whistleblower	Narrator (voice)	Film documentary	
2009	:30 Seconds	Jocelyn Mann	1 episode	
2009	Sea Princesses	Whale Queen (voice)	52 episodes	
2010–2011	The Jesters	Di Sunnington	16 episodes	
2010	A Very Short War	Gwen Carpenter	TV film documentary	
2010; 2012	Rake	Meg Makepeace QC	2 episodes	
2010–2012	Dance Academy	Miss Histead	3 episodes	
2011	Outback Kids	Narrator	3 episodes	
2011	Immigration Nation: The Secret History of Us	Narrator	3 episodes	
2011–2012	Laid	Jan Beane / Janis Kennedy	5 episodes	
2012	Miss Fisher's Murder Mysteries	Georgina Charlesworth	1 episode	
2013–2018	A Place to Call Home	Doris Collins	59 episodes	
2014	Janet King	Dianne Vaslich	4 episodes	
2015	The Principal	Val	Miniseries, 4 episodes	
2015	No Activity	Count Clerk	1 episode	
2016	Deep Water	Dr. Pedersen	Miniseries, 2 episodes	
2016	The Secret Daughter	Magistrate	1 episode	
2017	Sisters	Butch	2 episodes	
2018	There Goes Our Neighbourhood	Narrator	TV documentary	
2022	The Strange Chores	Yellowbeard (voice)	1 episode	
2022	Fisk	Edith	2 episodes	
2023	Totally Completely Fine	Beatrice	2 episodes	
2023	The Lost Flowers of Alice Hart	Merle	1 episode	
2024	Return to Paradise	Maggie	1 episode	
2024	Plum	Gwynn	1 episode	

=== Podcast series ===
Year	Title	Role	Type	Ref
2020	Tara Tremendous	Ms. Fernsby / Mrs. Biddlespach (voice)	Podcast series, season 3	
2021	Origins Unknown	Agatha Dunwick (voice)	Podcast series, season 2	

=== Video games ===
Year	Title	Role	Type
1999	M.U.G.E.N.	Voice	Video game

=== Theatre ===
Year	Title	Role	Notes	Ref
1971	Butterflies are Free	Stand-by	Phillip St Theatre, Sydney with Harry M. Miller	
1971	Niugini! Four Plays from Papua New Guinea		New Theatre, Sydney with Tasmanian Theatre Co	
1975	Richard III	Lady Anne	Nimrod, Sydney	
1976	A Toast to Melba		Tasmanian Theatre Co	
1977	Much Ado About Nothing	Hero	Nimrod, Sydney, Space Theatre, Adelaide	
1979	A Cheery Soul	Matron / Mrs Pinfold / Little Boy	Sydney Opera House with STC	
1979	Travelling North	Joan	Nimrod, Sydney, Melbourne Athenaeum	
1980	The House of the Deaf Man	Donna Gumersinda	Nimrod, Sydney	
1980	Britannicus	Albina	Seymour Centre, Sydney	
1981	The Revenger's Tragedy	Castiza	Playhouse, Adelaide with STCSA	
1981	Dessert Flambe		Nimrod, Sydney, University of Adelaide	
1981; 1983	Accidental Death of an Anarchist		Nimrod, Sydney, Melbourne Athenaeum with MTC	
1984	Gentlemen Prefer Blondes		North Qld tour with New Moon Theatre Co	
1984	Key Largo		North Qld tour with New Moon Theatre Co	
1984	Don's Party		North Qld tour with New Moon Theatre Co	
1985	Slow Love		Performance Space, Sydney	
1985	Richard III		Playhouse, Adelaide with STCSA	
1985	Big and Little		Playhouse, Adelaide with STCSA	
1985	Beautland		Playhouse, Adelaide with STCSA	
1985	Muse of Fire		Playhouse, Adelaide with STCSA	
1985	On the Razzle	Madame Knorr / Shopper / Crowd	Playhouse, Adelaide with STCSA	
1985	The Touch of Silk	Mrs Ryan	Playhouse, Adelaide with STCSA	
1985	Peter Pan	Slightly	Playhouse, Adelaide with STCSA	
1986	Dreams in an Empty City		Playhouse, Adelaide with STCSA	
1986	The Recruiting Officer	Sylvia	Playhouse, Adelaide with STCSA	
1986	The Real Thing	Charlotte	Playhouse, Adelaide with STCSA	
1986	Pravda	Cindy / Suzie Fontaine / Donna Le Roux	Playhouse, Adelaide with STCSA	
1987	Blood Relations	McClucky	Sydney Opera House, Playhouse, Adelaide with STCSA & STC	
1988	Absurd Person Singular		Playhouse, Adelaide with STCSA	
1988	King Lear		Playhouse, Adelaide with STCSA	
1988; 1989	Don's Party		Sydney Opera House, Melbourne Athenaeum	
1989	A Month of Sundays	Mrs Baker (alternate)	QPAC, Brisbane with QTC	
1989	Black Cockatoos		Belvoir, Sydney	
1989	Caravan		Q Theatre, Penrith	
1990	Daylight Saving	Stephanie	Wharf Theatre, Sydney with Ensemble Theatre	
1992	Caravan		Regal Theatre, Perth, Riverside Theatres Parramatta	
1992	Shorts at the Stables		Stables Theatre, Sydney with Griffin Theatre Company	
1992	Fractured Intimacies		Stables Theatre, Sydney with Griffin Theatre Company	
1992	Like Whiskey on the Breath of a Drunk You Love / The Flaw / Spumante Romantica		Stables Theatre, Sydney with Griffin Theatre Company	
1992	Water Daughter / Glycerine Tears / The White Room		Stables Theatre, Sydney	
1993	Top Girls		Wharf Theatre, Sydney with STC	
1993	The Temple	Brenda Blake / Lorna St John	Wharf Theatre, Sydney with STC	
1993–1995	Picasso at the Lapin Agile	Germaine	Malthouse Theatre, Melbourne, Playhouse, Adelaide, Belvoir, Sydney with Playbox	
1994	Cosi		VIC/NSW/ACT tour with MTC	
1996	Simpatico		Wharf Theatre, Sydney with STC	
1996	No Names... No Pack Drill		Marian St Theatre, Sydney	
1997	The Comedy of Errors		Sydney Opera House with STC	
1997	Picasso at the Lapin Agile		Melbourne Athenaeum with Playbox & Belvoir	
1998	Diving for Pearls		Ensemble Theatre, Sydney	
1999	The Little Cherry Orchard	Mother of the Bride	Belvoir, Sydney	
2000	Blithe Spirit	Ruth Condomine	Playhouse, Adelaide with STCSA	
2001	A Conversation	Coral Williams	Ensemble Theatre, Sydney	
2002	Angel City		Old Fitzroy Theatre, Sydney	
2002	Soulmates	Fiona	Australian tour with STC	
2003	Major Barbara	Lady Britomart	NIDA Theatre, Sydney with STC	
2003	Black Milk		Belvoir, Sydney	
2003	An Evening with Deborah Kennedy and Collette Mann: Bed Among the Lentils	Susan	Australian tour with HIT Productions	
2004	What the Butler Saw	Mrs Prentice	Belvoir, Sydney	
2005	Myth, Propaganda and Disaster in Nazi Germany and Contemporary America	Amy / Therapist	Stables Theatre, Sydney with Tangent Productions	
2005	President Wilson in Paris		VIC/NSW/QLD tour with HIT Productions	
2006	Woman in Mind	Muriel / Doris	Sydney Opera House with STC	
2006	The Glory	Ruth	Butter Factory Theatre, Wodonga with HotHouse Theatre	
2008	The Female of the Species	Margot Mason	Playhouse, Perth with Black Swan Theatre Co	
2009	Rough Draft #3		Wharf Theatre, Sydney with STC	
2009; 2011	The Book of Everything	Auntie Pie	Belvoir, Sydney, Her Majesty's Theatre, Adelaide, Seymour Centre, Sydney	
2011	Snow on Mars	Nan	Seymour Centre, Sydney with Theatre of Image	
2012	Pygmalion	Mrs Pearce	STC	
2012	The Book of Everything	Auntie Pie	New Victory Theater, New York	
2014	Other Desert Cities	Polly Wyeth	Ensemble Theatre, Sydney	
	The Shoe-Horn Sonata	Bridie	Riverside Theatres Parramatta	
2015	Arms and the Man	Catherine Petkoff	Sydney Opera House with STC	
2015; 2016	The Importance of Being Earnest	Lady Bracknell	Bella Vista Farm, Leura Park Estate with Sport for Jove	
2016	Fawlty Towers – Live	Mrs Richards	Australian tour	

== Awards and nominations ==
Year	Work	Award	Category	Result	Ref
1994	The Sum of Us	Australian Film Institute Awards	Best Supporting Actress	Nominated	
2003	Soulmates	Mo Awards	Best Actress	Nominated	
2010	The Book of Everything	Helpmann Awards	Best Female Actor in a Supporting Role in a Play	Nominated	
2012	The Jesters	Equity Ensemble Awards	Most Outstanding Performance by an Ensemble in a Comedy Series	Nominated	
2014	A Place to Call Home season 1	Equity Ensemble Awards	Most Outstanding Performance by an Ensemble in a Drama Series	Nominated	
2015	Arms and the Man	Glugs Theatrical Awards	Best Supporting Actress	Nominated	
2016	The Importance of Being Earnest	Glugs Theatrical Awards	Most Outstanding Actress	Nominated	
2016	Fawlty Towers: The Play	Glugs Theatrical Awards	Most Outstanding Supporting Actress	Nominated	
2019	Larry Time	Made in the West Film Festival	Jury Award for Best Actress	Nominated	
2024	Cold Water	Stellar Short Film Festival	Best Performance	Nominated	
