= Nancye Hayes =

Australian actress (born 1943)

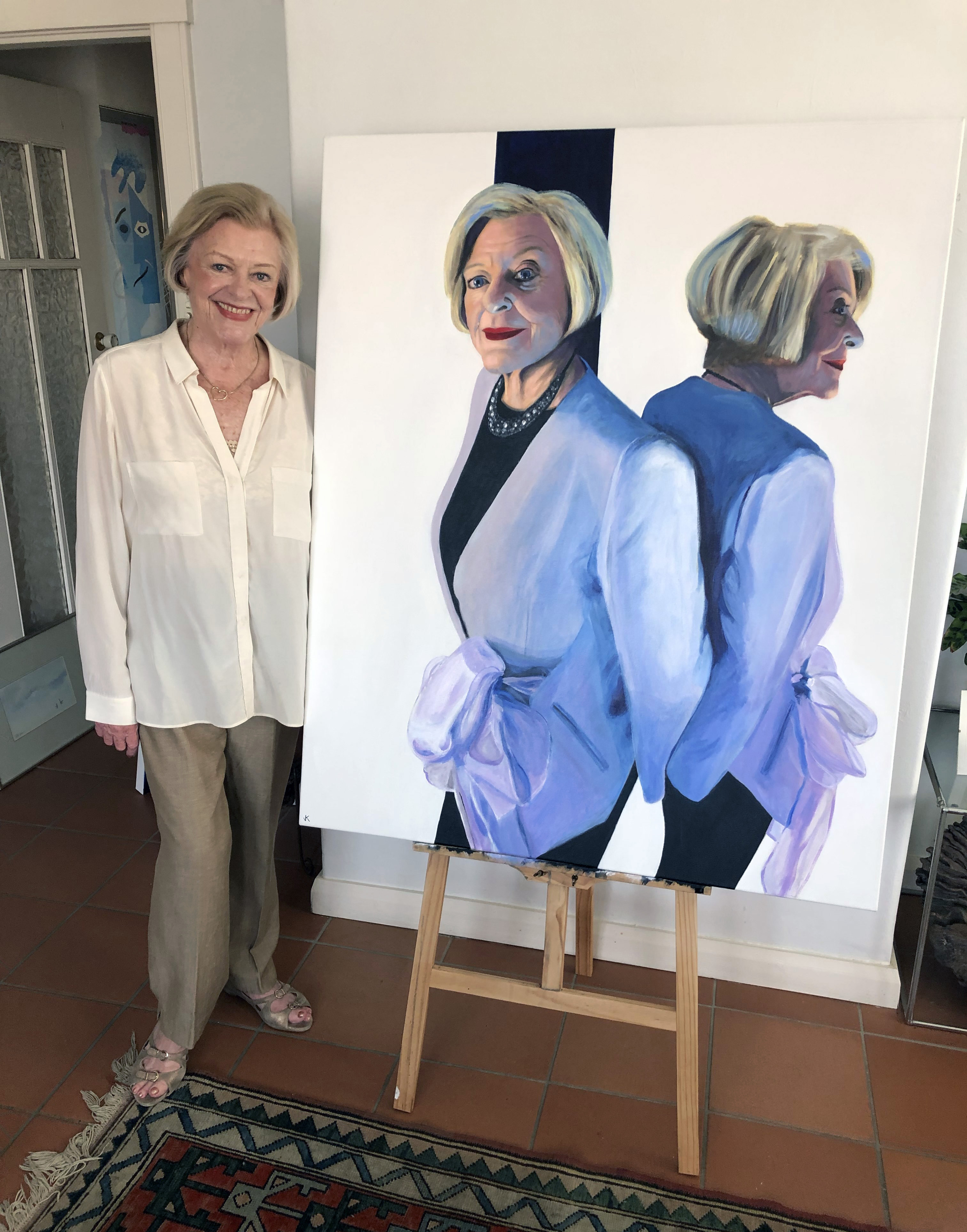
- Hayes with her portrait by artist John Klein
- Born: Nancye Lee Hayes; January 1943 (age 83); Sydney, Australia
- Other name: Nancye Bertles (married name)
- Occupations: Actress; dancer; singer; director/choreographer
- Years active: 1962–present
- Spouse: Bob Bertles

Nancye Lee Bertles AM (née Hayes; born January 1943), billed under her maiden name as Nancye Hayes, is an Australian actress, dancer, singer and choreographer/director and narrator. She has been a leading figure in Australian musical theatre since the 1960s. Although her roles have been almost exclusively in theatre, she has briefly worked in television as a character actress, filling in for Judy Nunn on the soap opera Home and Away.

== Early life and education ==
Nancye Hayes was born in 11th January 1943. She grew up in the Sydney suburb of Manly, an only child. At the age of seven, she had an operation to remove a growth in her hip joint, and the recovery included strapping her leg with irons. After her father died in a car crash when Hayes was eleven, her mother became a barmaid at the old Pacific Hotel in Manly. Nancye attended Stella Maris College, Manly, a Catholic school run by the Sisters of the Good Samaritan.

She began dancing lessons at age nine at Hazel and Violet Meldrum's studio. Hazel had been a choreographer for the leading Australian theatrical firm J. C. Williamson's.

== Career ==
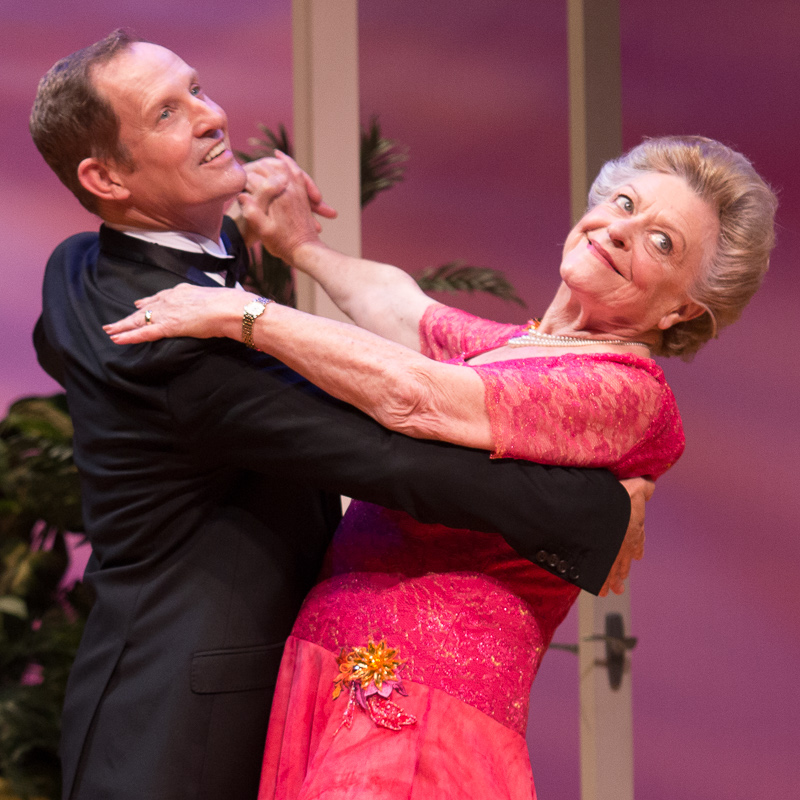
Hayes With Todd McKenny, in Six Dance Lessons in Six Weeks

=== Theatre ===
Hayes, aged eighteen, left a job at a Sydney office to join the chorus of an Australian production of My Fair Lady. From 1963 she understudied or played small roles in productions such as the musical How to Succeed in Business Without Really Trying, My Fair Lady, Promises Promises, Hello, Dolly! and The Boys from Syracuse for J. C. Williamson's. She also performed in Kiss Me, Kate, Brigadoon, Annie Get Your Gun and Little Me at the Menzies Theatre Restaurant in Sydney.

In 1967, Hayes received wide notice playing the title role in the original Australian cast of Sweet Charity.

Over the next thirty years, she performed leading roles in Australian casts of many musicals including Fastrada in Pippin (1974), Lily St. Regis in Annie (1978–1979), Roxie Hart in Chicago (1981–1982), Miss Adelaide in Guys and Dolls (1986–1987), Mrs Lovett in Sweeney Todd (1987), Liliane La Fleur in Nine (1987–1988) and Dorothy Brock in 42nd Street (1989–1993). She later played supporting roles including Aunt Eller in Oklahoma! (The Production Company, 2005), Mrs Higgins in My Fair Lady (Opera Australia, 2008), Madame Armfeldt in A Little Night Music (Opera Australia, 2009) and Edith Bouvier Beale in Grey Gardens (The Production Company, 2011).

Since the 1980s Hayes has also appeared in many Australian-written musicals. These include Songs from Sideshow Alley (Classic Corporation, 1980), Variations (Nimrod Theatre, 1982), Summer Rain (Sydney Theatre Company, 1989), Jonah Jones (STCSA, 1991), Eureka! (Essgee, 2004) and Metro Street (STCSA, 2009). She appeared in the Australian Broadcasting Corporation television special on Australian musicals Once In A Blue Moon and its soundtrack recording. Hayes appeared in Hayes @ the Hayes (Hayes Theatre, 2019), a biography of her life devised by Tony Sheldon.

Her drama credits for Australia's major theatre companies and commercial producers include Born Yesterday, Danton's Death, Same Time, Next Year, Going Home, Dusa, Fish, Stas and Vi, The Glass Menagerie, Steel Magnolias, Stepping Out, and The Importance of Being Earnest. Her cabaret show, Nancye with an E, toured Australia in 1992. In 2006, she performed with Todd McKenney in his first non-musical role in the Ensemble Theatre's production of Six Dance Lessons in Six Weeks at the Playhouse Theatre in the Sydney Opera House. It became the theatre's most successful play ever, and the pair re-united ten years later for another season along with Sandra Bates in her final directorial role.

=== Film and television ===
Hayes was a fill-in for Judy Nunn, in the series Home and Away, whilst Nunn was unwell, briefly taking over her character of Ailsa Stewart.

Roles in miniseries include Elsie Curtin in The Last Bastion and secretary to Minister Rex Connor in The Dismissal. Roles in TV series include Consider Your Verdict, Carson's Law, Rafferty's Rules, G.P., Blue Heelers and House Husbands.

== Personal life ==
Hayes was married to jazz saxophone musician and bandleader Bob Bertles, whom she met when he played in the band of Chicago, in which she starred. Her married name is Nancye Lee Bertles, but she uses her maiden name professionally.

== Honours and awards ==
Hayes was granted a Medal of the Order of Australia (OAM) on 8 June 1981 "for service to the performing arts".

She was appointed a Member of the Order of Australia (AM) on 26 January 2014 "for significant service to the performing arts, particularly musical theatre, as an actor, choreographer and director".

The Hayes Theatre in Potts Point, Sydney which has a focus on small-scale musical theatre and cabaret is named after her.

Hayes, alongside her showbiz contemporaries Jill Perryman and Toni Lamond, has been named a "Grand Dame of Theatre".

=== Awards ===
| Association | Award | Year | Production | Result |
|---|---|---|---|---|
| Green Room Awards | Green Room Award for Best Female Actor in a Leading Role (Music Theatre) | 1986 | Guys and Dolls | Won |
| Glugs Theatrical Awards | For Contribution to Theatre | 1986 | Herself | Awarded |
| Helpmann Awards | Helpmann Award for Best Female Actor in a Supporting Role in a Musical − | 2009 | My Fair Lady | Won |
| Helpmann Awards | JC Williamson Award | 2011 | Herself | Awarded |
| Glugs Theatrical Awards | Chief Glug's Award for Excellence Behind the Scenes | 2011 | Herself | Awarded |
| Helpmann Awards | Helpmann Award for Best Female Actor in a Supporting Role in a Musical | 2012 | Grey Gardens | Won |
| Sydney Theatre Awards | Best Performance in a Supporting Role in a Musical | 2023 | A Little Night Music | Won |

== Filmography ==
=== Film ===
| Year | Title | Role | Type |
|---|---|---|---|
| 1976 | The Sentimental Bloke | Rose | TV film |

=== Television ===
| Year | Title | Role | Type |
|---|---|---|---|
| 1963 | Consider Your Verdict | Rita Grange | TV series, 1 episode |
| 1967 | Bandstand | Guest performer (singing "I'm a Brass Band" from Sweet Charity) | TV series, 1 episode |
| 1967 | The Mavis Bramston Show | Various characters | TV series, 1 episode |
| 1968 | Anything Goes | | TV series |
| 1968 | Sydney Tonight | Guest | TV series, 1 episode |
| 1969 | A Night of Stars | Guest | TV special |
| 1970 | The Mike Walsh Show | Guest | TV series, 1 episode |
| 1971 | Nancye | Herself | TV special |
| 1972 | Kamahl | Guest | TV series, 1 episode |
| 1972 | The Spoiler | Guest lead role | TV series, 1 episode |
| 1973 | The True Blue Show | Various characters | TV series, 1 episode |
| 1975 | Something Special | Guest | TV series, 1 episode |
| 1976 | The Celebrity Game | Contestant | TV series, 1 episode |
| 1978 | Father, Dear Father In Australia | Helen Randall | TV series, episode 2: "A Home from Home" |
| 1978 | The Sullivans | Nance | TV series, 1 episode |
| 1980 | Don Dunstan's Australia | Guest | TV series, 1 season |
| 1981 | The Mike Walsh Show | Guest performer (singing "My Own Best Friend" from Chicagowith Geraldine Turner) | TV series, 1 episode |
| 1981 | Menotti | Ruth | TV series, 1 episode |
| 1981 | The Mike Walsh Show | Guest performer (singing "Roxie" from Chicago) | TV series, 1 episode |
| 1982 | MPSIB | Guest role | TV series, 1 episode |
| 1982 | Parkinson In Australia | Guest | TV series, 1 episode |
| 1982 | The Mike Walsh Show | Guest performer (singing "Big Spender" with Natalie Mosco, Robyn Moase, Olga Tamara & Tina Bursill) | TV series, 1 episode |
| 1982 | What It's Like in a Theatre | Narrator | Film documentary |
| 1983 | Carson's Law | Dorothy Nesbitt | TV series, 2 episodes |
| 1983 | Court House | | TV pilot |
| 1983; 1984 | The Mike Walsh Show | Guest | TV series, 3 episodes |
| 1983 | The Dismissal | Connor's Secretary | TV miniseries, 2 episodes |
| 1984 | The Last Bastion | Elsie Curtin | TV miniseries, 3 episodes |
| 1985 | After Noon | Guest | TV series, 1 episode |
| 1986 | Eleven A.M. | Guest | TV series, 1 episode |
| 1986 | Midday at the Movies with Stuart Wagstaff | Guest | TV series, 1 episode |
| 1988 | Australia Day Live Concert | Guest | TV special |
| 1989 | Rafferty's Rules | Sheree Martin | TV series, 1 episode |
| 1989 | Turn Onto Tap | Herself | Video |
| 1989 | The Bert Newton Show | Guest performer (with Leonie Page & Todd McKenney - 42nd Street) | TV series, 1 episode |
| 1989; 1994; 1996 | The Midday Show | Guest | TV series, 3 episodes |
| 1989 | Graham Kennedy Coast to Coast | Guest performer (singing You're Getting to Be a Habit with Me) | TV series, 1 episode |
| 1990 | Tonight Live with Steve Vizard | Guest | TV series, 1 episode |
| 1991 | G.P. | Anna Abrahams | TV series, 1 episode |
| 1991 | Til Ten | Guest | TV series, 1 episode |
| 1991 | In Sydney Today | Guest | TV series, 1 episode |
| 1992 | The Girl From Tomorrow II: Tomorrow's End | Maeve | TV series, 4 episodes |
| 1992 | Six Pack | Mrs Zweig | TV miniseries, episode 4: "Death Duties" |
| 1993; 1994 | Ernie and Denise | Guest | TV series, 2 episodes |
| 1993 | What's Cooking? | Guest | TV series, 1 episode |
| 1993–2005 | Good Morning Australia | Guest | TV series |
| 1993 | Review | Guest presenter | TV series, 1 episode |
| 1994 | At Home | Guest | TV series, 2 episodes |
| 1994 | Once in a Blue Moon: A Celebration of Australian Musicals | Herself | TV special |
| 1994 | Nancye Hayes - At the School of Arts Cafe | Herself | TV special |
| 1994 | Carols in the Domain | Performer | TV special |
| 1995 | Music Theatre | Herself | TV series |
| 1996 | Sale of the Century | Contestant | TV series, 1 episode |
| 1997 | Monday to Friday | Guest | TV series, 1 episode |
| 1997 | Today | Guest | TV series, 1 episode |
| 1998 | This Is Your Life | Special guest | TV series, 1 episode "Nancye Hayes" |
| 1998, 1999 | Denise | Guest | TV series, 2 episodes |
| 1999 | Blue Heelers | Audrey Ropers | TV series, 1 episode |
| 2000 | Home and Away | Ailsa Stewart (stand-in for Judy Nunn) | TV series, 15 episodes |
| 2000 | In the First Person | Guest | TV series, 1 episode |
| 2003; 2005; 2007 | Mornings with Kerri-Anne | Guest | TV series, 3 episodes |
| 2006 | Studio A with Simon Burke | Guest | TV series, 1 episode |
| 2006; 2012 | Dancing with the Stars | Audience member | TV series, 2 episodes |
| 2007 | Spicks and Specks | Guest | TV series, 1 episode |
| 2007 | Talking Heads | Guest | TV series, 1 episode |
| 2008 | The Pacific | Jeanne Sledge | TV miniseries |
| 2011 | Helpmann Awards | Winner – JC Williamson Award for Lifetime Achievement to The Arts sector and Theatre (with Toni Lamond & Jill Perryman) | TV special |
| 2012 | Helpmann Awards | Winner – Best Female Actor in Support Role for Grey Gardens | TV special |
| 2014 | Mornings | Guest | TV series, 1 episode |
| 2014 | The Morning Show | Guest | TV series, 1 episode |
| 2016; 2019 | The Daily Edition | Guest | TV series, 2 episodes |
| 2016; 2017; 2019; 2023 | Today Extra | Guest | TV series, 4 episodes |
| 2017 | House Husbands | Liz | TV series, 3 episodes |

== Theatre ==
=== As actor ===
| Year | Title | Role | Type |
|---|---|---|---|
| 1961 | My Fair Lady | Dancer | Her Majesty's Theatre, Brisbane |
| 1963 | My Fair Lady | | Her Majesty's Theatre, Adelaide |
| 1963-64 | How to Succeed in Business Without Really Trying | Hedy LaRue | Her Majesty's Theatre, Melbourne, His Majesty's Theatre, Perth |
| 1965 | Hello, Dolly! | Mrs Rose | Her Majesty's Theatre, Sydney, Her Majesty's Theatre, Melbourne |
| 1966 | The Boys from Syracuse | Luce | Comedy Theatre, Melbourne |
| 1967 | Brigadoon | Meg | Menzies Theatre Restaurant, Sydney |
| 1967 | Kiss Me, Kate | Bianca | Menzies Theatre Restaurant, Sydney |
| 1967 | Sweet Charity | Charity | Her Majesty's Theatre, Sydney, Her Majesty's Theatre, Melbourne, Her Majesty's Theatre, Adelaide |
| 1968 | Annie Get Your Gun | Annie | Menzies Theatre Restaurant, Sydney |
| 1968 | Little Me | Bells | Menzies Theatre Restaurant, Sydney |
| 1968 | Bells are Ringing | Ella Peterson | Menzies Theatre Restaurant, Sydney |
| 1970 | Dames at Sea | Ruby | Phillip Street Theatre with Harry M Miller |
| 1970-71 | Promises, Promises | Marge MacDougall | Her Majesty's Theatre, Melbourne, Theatre Royal, Sydney |
| 1971 | Born Yesterday | | Arts Theatre, Adelaide with STCSA |
| 1971 | Cabaret | Sally Bowles | Playhouse Theatre, Perth |
| 1972 | The Star-Spangled Girl | | St Martins Theatre, Melbourne |
| 1972 | Tonight at 8.30: Shadow Play / Red Peppers / Family Album | | Russell Street Theatre |
| 1972 | Forget-Me-Not Lane | | Russell Street Theatre |
| 1972 | Danton's Death | | Russell Street Theatre |
| 1972 | The Two of Us | | Twelfth Night Theatre |
| 1973 | The Threepenny Opera | | Playhouse Theatre, Perth |
| 1973 | Cowardy Custard | | St Martins Theatre, Melbourne |
| 1974 | Pippin | Fastrada | Her Majesty's Theatre, Melbourne, Her Majesty's Theatre, Sydney |
| 1975 | Irene | Jane Burke | Her Majesty's Theatre, Sydney |
| 1976-77 | Same Time Next Year | Doris | Comedy Theatre, Melbourne, Theatre Royal, Sydney, Her Majesty's Theatre, Brisbane, Her Majesty's Theatre, Adelaide, Theatre Royal, Hobart |
| 1977 | Going Home | Molly | Nimrod Theatre Company |
| 1978 | Dusa, Fish, Stas and Vi | Dusa | Russell Street Theatre, Playhouse Theatre, Perth, Union Hall, Adelaide, Theatre Royal, Sydney |
| 1978-79 | Annie | Lily St. Regis | Her Majesty's Theatre, Melbourne, Princess Theatre, Melbourne, Her Majesty's Theatre, Sydney |
| 1980 | I'm Getting My Act Together And Taking It On The Road | Heather | Space Theatre, Adelaide, Sydney Opera House Recording Hall |
| 1980 | On the Wallaby | Kath | Playhouse, Adelaide |
| 1980 | Songs from Sideshow Alley | | Paris Theatre, Sydney with Classic Corporation |
| 1981-82 | Chicago | Roxie Hart | Sydney Opera House Drama Theatre, Theatre Royal, Sydney, Comedy Theatre, Melbourne, Festival Theatre, Adelaide |
| 1982 | Variations | | Nimrod Theatre Company |
| 1983 | Chicago | Roxie Hart | Lee Theatre, Hong Kong, Playhouse Theatre, Perth |
| 1983 | The Magical Tail of Puff the Magic Dragon | | Seymour Centre |
| 1984 | The Conquest of Carmen Miranda | | Sydney Opera House Recording Hall |
| 1985 | Stepping Out | Mavis | Regal Theatre, Perth, Opera Theatre, Adelaide, Comedy Theatre, Melbourne, Canberra Theatre Centre |
| 1985 | The Glass Menagerie | Amanda | Playhouse, Melbourne with Melbourne Theatre Company |
| 1987-88 | Guys and Dolls | Miss Adelaide | Her Majesty's Theatre, Sydney, Her Majesty's Theatre, Adelaide |
| 1986 | A Coupla White Chicks | Maude Mix | University of Sydney, Footbridge Theatre |
| 1987-88 | Nine | Liliane La Fleur | Comedy Theatre, Melbourne, Festival Theatre, Adelaide, Lyric Theatre, Brisbane, Her Majesty's Theatre, Sydney |
| 1987 | Sweeney Todd | Mrs. Lovett | Opera Theatre, Adelaide |
| 1988 | Steel Magnolias | M'Lynn Eatenton | Seymour Centre, Melbourne Athenaeum |
| 1988 | Dames at Sea | Mona | Marian Street Theatre & Adelaide |
| 1989 | Summer Rain | Ruby Slocum | Sydney Opera House Drama Theatre with Sydney Theatre Company |
| 1989-93 | 42nd Street | Dorothy Brock | Her Majesty's Theatre, Sydney, His Majesty's Theatre, Perth, Lyric Theatre, Brisbane, Festival Theatre, Adelaide, Her Majesty's Theatre, Melbourne |
| 1991 | Two Grand in the Hand | | Tilbury Hotel |
| 1991 | Love Letters | | Marian Street Theatre |
| 1991 | Jonah Jones | Mrs Yabsley | Space Theatre, Adelaide with STCSA |
| 1992 | Wizard of Oz - The Musical | Good Witch / Aunty 'Em | Adelaide Festival Centre, Victorian Arts Centre with Victorian Opera |
| 1992-94 | Nancye with an E (cabaret show) | | Australian national tour with Hayden Productions |
| 1993 | Follies | | State Theatre, Melbourne |
| 1994 | Legends | Singer | Sydney Opera House Playhouse, Tilbury Hotel |
| 1994 | Mack and Mabel - In Concert | | State Theatre, Melbourne, State Theatre, Sydney |
| 1994 | The Bard on Broadway | | Regent Hotel, Sydney |
| 1994 | The Return of the Last Night of the Proms | Singer | Sydney Opera House Concert Hall |
| 1995 | Cinderella | Fairy Godmother | State Theatre, Sydney |
| 1996 | Livingstone | Maya Rosenthal | Marian Street Theatre |
| 1996-97 | The Mourning After | Belle Doyle | Australian national tour |
| 1997 | Here Comes Showtime! | | Marian Street Theatre |
| 1997 | Death Defying Acts | Dorothy / Carol | Laycock Street Theatre, Marian Street Theatre |
| 1998 | Follies | Hattie Walker | Sydney Opera House Concert Hall |
| 1998 | Show Boat | Parthy Anne Hawks | Lyric Theatre, Sydney, Regent Theatre, Melbourne |
| 1999 | Funny Girl | Mrs Brice | Melbourne Concert Hall |
| 1998 | Follies in Concert | Phyllis Rogers Stone | Sydney Opera House Concert Hall |
| 2002 | The Music Man | Mrs Paroo | State Theatre, Melbourne |
| 2003 | Stagecraft Nancye Hayes | Herself | Space Theatre, Adelaide |
| 2003 | Stage Door | | The Basement, Sydney |
| 2003-04 | The Snow Queen | Narrator | Dunstan Playhouse, Sydney Theatre |
| 2004 | Let's Face the Music and Dance | Singer | Melbourne Concert Hall, Sydney Opera House Concert Hall |
| 2004 | Eureka! | Lady Hotham | Her Majesty's Theatre, Melbourne with Essgee Entertainment |
| 2004 | Hats Off! to Sondheim | | National Theatre, Melbourne |
| 2004 | Australia's Leading Ladies | Compere | Concert Hall, Brisbane |
| 2005 | Summer Rain | Texas / Miss Maisie Tengrove | Sydney Theatre |
| 2005 | Oklahoma! | Aunt Eller | State Theatre, Melbourne with The Production Company |
| 2006 | Kookaburra Launch Concert | Singer | Lyric Theatre, Sydney |
| 2006-07 | Six Dance Lessons in Six Weeks | Lily Harrison | Sydney Opera House with Ensemble Theatre |
| 2007 | Sweet Charity | Charity | State Theatre, Melbourne |
| 2007 | Metro Street | Jo McAuley | St Martins Youth Arts Centre |
| 2007 | Ozmade Musicals Concert | Singer | Melbourne Athenaeum |
| 2008 | Follies | Hattie Walker | State Theatre, Melbourne |
| 2008 | My Fair Lady | Mrs Higgins | State Theatre, Melbourne, Sydney Opera House Opera Theatre, Canberra Theatre Centre, Lyric Theatre, Brisbane with Opera Australia |
| 2008 | Gala Concert | Singer | Her Majesty's Theatre, Melbourne |
| 2008 | An All-Star Tribute to Peter Allen | | Star Theatre, Sydney |
| 2009 | A Little Night Music | Madame Armfeldt | Arts Centre, Melbourne with Opera Australia |
| 2009 | Metro Street | Jo McAuley | STCSA |
| 2010 | Murderers | Lucy Stickler | Ensemble Theatre |
| 2011 | Turns | Marjory Joy | Australian national tour |
| 2011 | Grey Gardens | Edith Bouvier Beale | State Theatre, Melbourne with The Production Company |
| 2012 | Annie | Miss Hannigan | The Gordon Frost Organisation |
| 2014 | Sunday in the Park with George | Old Woman / Blair Daniels | Playhouse, Melbourne with Victorian Opera |
| 2014 | Beauty and the Beast | Mrs Potts | Adam J Lowe |
| 2014 | The Greenroom Project | | Queensland Cabaret Festival |
| 2014 | The Importance of Being Earnest | Lady Bracknell | Dunstan Playhouse, Canberra Theatre Centre with STCSA |
| 2014 | Beyond Desire | Martha | Hayes Theatre |
| 2015 | Bye Bye Birdie | Mrs Mae Peterson | Seymour Centre |
| 2015 | The Pirates of Penzance | Ruth | Harvest Rsin Theatre Company |
| 2015 | Dear World | Gabrielle, The Madwoman of St Sulpice | Hayes Theatre |
| 2015 | Jerry's Girls | Singer / actor | Playhouse, Melbourne with The Production Company |
| 2016 | Six Dance Lessons in Six Weeks | Lily | IMB Theatre, Wollongong, The Concourse, Chatswood with Ensemble Theatre |
| 2016 | Follies in Concert | Hattie Walker | Melbourne Recital Centre with Storeyboard |
| 2016 | Funny Girl | Mrs Brice || State Theatre, Melbourne | |
| 2017 | Minnie and Liraz | Minnie Cohen | Fairfax Studio, Melbourne, Geelong Performing Arts Centre |
| 2017 | Brigadoon | Mrs Forsythe | State Theatre, Melbourne |
| 2017 | Good Omens | Madame Tracy | Seymour Centre |
| 2018 | Bosom Buddies | | Australian national tour |
| 2018 | Variety Gala | | Festival Theatre, Adelaide |
| 2018 | A Gentleman's Guide to Love and Murder | Miss Shingle | Playhouse, Melbourne |
| 2019 | A Little Night Music | Madame Armfeldt | Playhouse, Melbourne |
| 2019 | Hayes @ the Hayes | Herself | Hayes Theatre |
| 2020 | Irene | Mrs O'Dare | Hayes Theatre |
| 2020 | Ripcord | Abby | Dunstan Playhouse |
| 2021 | Half Time | | Hayes Theatre |
| 2022 | Mary Poppins | Bird Woman | Sydney Lyric Theatre |
| 2023 | A Little Night Music | Madame Armfeldt | Hayes Theatre |
| 2025 | 4000 Miles | Vera | Sydney Theatre Company |
| 2026 | Anastasia | Grand Dowager Empress | Sydney Lyric Theatre |

=== As crew ===
| Year | Title | Role | Type |
|---|---|---|---|
| 1979 | Sisters | Choreographer | Seymour Centre |
| 1979 | Gentlemen Only | Choreographer | Playbox Theatre, Melbourne |
| 1979 | The Venetian Twins | Choreographer | Sydney Opera House Drama Theatre |
| 1981 | The Venetian Twins | Choreographer | Seymour Centre, Canberra Theatre Centre, Festival Theatre, Adelaide, Her Majesty's Theatre, Melbourne, Geelong |
| 1982 | Flash Jim | Choreographer | Nimrod Theatre Company |
| 1983 | Firing Squad | Choreographer | Her Majesty's Theatre, Melbourne, Her Majesty's Theatre, Sydney |
| 1985 | Judi Connelli with the Ritz Company | Choreographer | Kinselas, Darlinghurst |
| 1988 | Noel and Gertie | Choreographer | Wharf Theatre |
| 1988 | Dames at Sea | Director / choreographer | Marian Street Theatre |
| 1991 | The Fantasticks | Director | Newtown Studio Theatre |
| 1992 | Nancye with an E (cabaret show) | Devisor | Australian national tour |
| 1993 | My Fair Lady | Choreographer | State Theatre, Melbourne |
| 1994 | Falsettos | Choreographer | Sydney Opera House Drama Theatre, Monash University, Theatre Royal, Hobart, Canberra Theatre Centre |
| 1995 | Guys and Dolls | Choreographer | UNSW Parade Theatre |
| 1996-97 | My Fair Lady | Choreographer | Lyric Theatre, Brisbane, Capitol Theatre, Melbourne |
| 1996 | Merrily We Roll Along | Choreographer | University of Sydney, Footbridge Theatre |
| 1997 | The Screw is Loose | Director | Tilbury Hotel |
| 1999 | Barrymore | Director / Assistant Choreographer | Cremorne Theatre |
| 2000 | Gypsy | Director | State Theatre, Melbourne |
| 2000 | Annie | Resident Director | Lyric Theatre, Sydney, Regent Theatre, Melbourne |
| 2001 | The World Goes 'Round | Choreographer | Acting Studio, WA |
| 2001-02 | The Wizard of Oz | Director | Lyric Theatre, Sydney, Regent Theatre, Melbourne |
| 2004 | Australia's Leading Ladies | Director | Concert Hall, Brisbane |
| 2005 | Crazy for You | Director | The Academy Main Theatre, WA |
| 2010-11 | The Boy From Oz | Director | State Theatre, Melbourne |
| 2013 | Noël and Gertie | Director | Australian national tour |
