= Amy Lehpamer =

Australian musical theatre performer

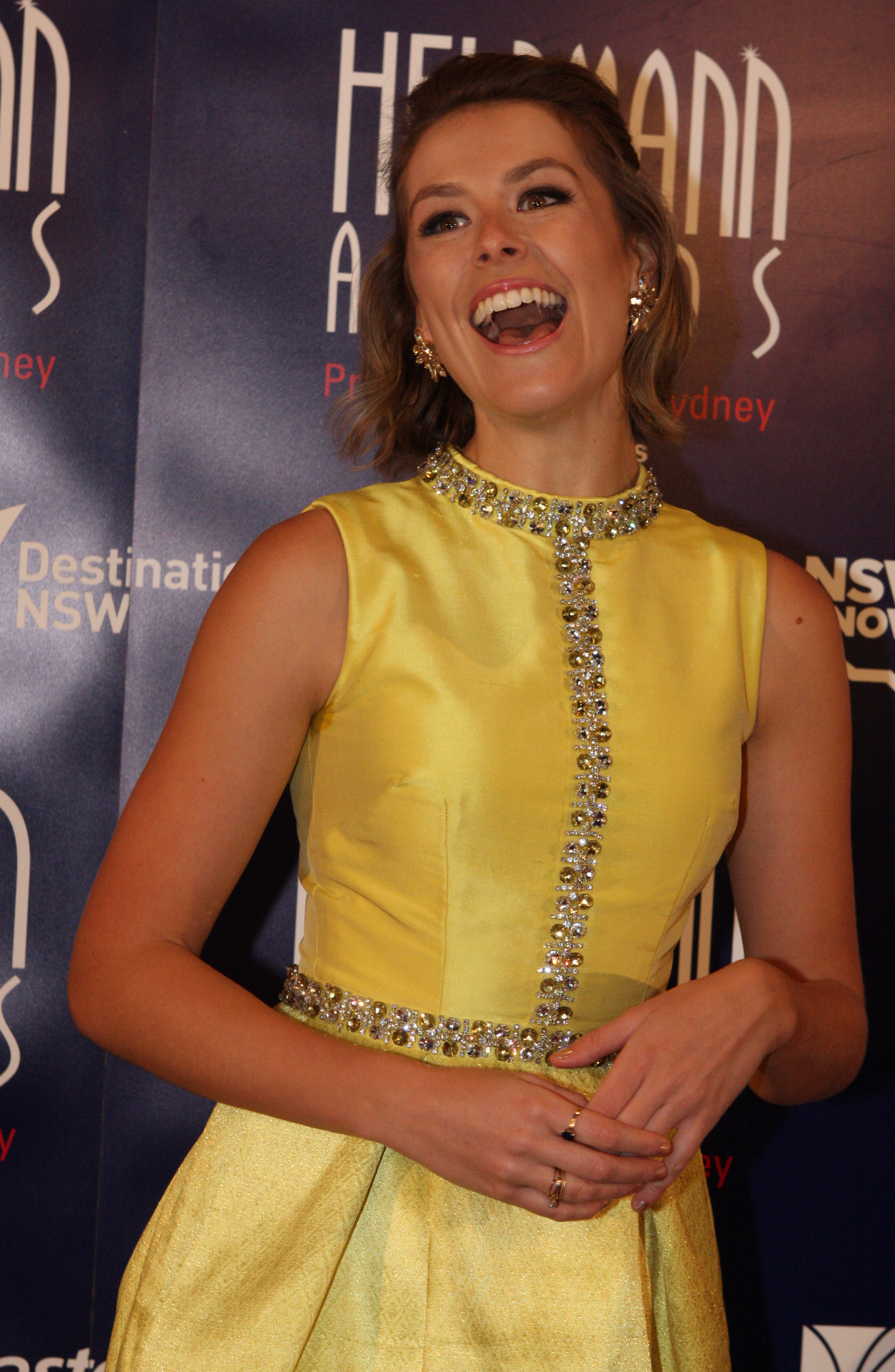
- Education: Sacred Heart College, Geelong; University of Melbourne
- Occupations: Actress; Musician
- Years active: 2008−present
- Known for: The Sound of Music; Dusty: The Musical; The Rocky Horror Show
- Spouse: Tom Cooney
- Children: 1

Amy Lehpamer is an Australian musical theatre performer, known for her lead roles in stage productions of The Sound of Music, Dusty: The Musical and The Rocky Horror Show. She has also had television roles.

== Early life and education ==
Lehpamer grew up in the Geelong suburb of Bell Post Hill, in Victoria, in a family of Croatian background. The youngest by seven years, Lehpamer often was looked after by her three siblings when her parents were out.

Lehpamer attended Geelong’s Sacred Heart College, a Catholic school. She took violin lessons from the age of six, playing at a serious level in her teens.

A self-taught singer and dancer, Lehpamer scored a role as one of Joseph’s brothers, Asher, in her school production of Joseph and the Amazing Technicolor Dreamcoat within her first few months of high school. From there, she performed in her school musical every year, playing Kim MacAfee in Bye Bye Birdie, Anita in West Side Story and Tevye in Fiddler on the Roof – complete with her violin in the latter. She was also in a local amateur production of Godspell for Doorstep Productions.

Lehpamer auditioned for Western Australian Academy of Performing Arts (WAAPA), a training ground for aspiring musical theatre performers, but was rejected twice – the second time after taking a gap year as a music teacher's assistant at a boarding school in England.

When she returned to Australia, Lehpamer studied a Bachelor of Arts (English Literature and Japanese) at the University of Melbourne, where she got involved in student theatre productions. She played Judas in Jesus Christ Superstar, winning the 2005 Victorian Music Theatre Guild award for best female performance. Simultaneously, she studied violin at the Conservatorium, but ultimately decided to focus on acting.

Partway through university, Lehpamer landed a summer job with Tokyo Disney in Japan, working on Big Band Beat, a live jazz review. She graduated from university in 2008.

Lehpamer also has an Associate Diploma in Music (AMusA) on violin.

== Career ==
=== Stage ===
Directly following the completion of her final semester at university, Lehpamer secured the role of Young Phyllis in Stephen Sondheim's Follies with The Production Company in 2008. She then understudied the role of Simone Callahan as part of the 2008/2009 original cast for Eddie Perfect's Shane Warne: the Musical, based on the life of Australian cricketer Shane Warne.

Lehpamer's theatre career gained traction through her role as Christine Colgate in the musical adaptation of Dirty Rotten Scoundrels for The Production Company in 2009. She was initially cast as a supporting character but when the lead actress dropped out, Lehpamer took over the role. The following year, she played the role of Sukey Tawdry in The Threepenny Opera for Melbourne's Malthouse Theatre and Victorian Opera.

In 2011, Lehpamer appeared as stripper Sherrie in the rock musical Rock of Ages, which opened at the Comedy Theatre, Melbourne. Her portrayal earned her a Helpmann Awards nomination and a theatrepeople.com.au award for Best Female Actor in a Musical. She then originated the title role of food writer Margaret Fulton in the premiere of Margaret Fulton – Queen of the Dessert in 2012.

In 2013, four years on from her previous appearance in Dirty Rotten Scoundrels, Lehpamer once again played the role of Christine Colgate in a Theatre Royal iteration of the play – her first leading role in a Sydney production. Her performance earned her a BroadwayWorld, Sydney award for Best Actress in a Musical. She also performed again in Shane Warne: The Musical – this time in the part of Donna Wright – in a 2014 Melbourne and Adelaide production, and featured on the cast recording.

From 2014 to 2015, Lehpamer played Reza in Once for the Gordon Frost Organisation and Melbourne Theatre Company, which also gave her the opportunity to showcase her skill as a violinist. She received a Helpmann Awards nomination for her portrayal. This was followed by 2015 productions of High Society in which she played the part of Tracy Lord for Hayes Theatre, and The Rocky Horror Show as Janet Weiss, opposite Craig McLachlan.

She then landed the coveted lead role of Maria in the 2015/2016 Australian tour of The Sound of Music, alongside Cameron Daddo, Marina Prior and Lorraine Bayly, which won her a Sydney Theatre Award for Best Actress in a Musical. She followed this with another starring role as Dusty Springfield in Dusty for The Production Company, in late 2016 and early 2017, which saw her nominated for a Helpmann Award.

She next starred in the Australian production of Beautiful: The Carole King Musical, playing Cynthia Weil, receiving a Helpmann Award for Best Female Actor in a Supporting Role in a Musical in 2018. From 2018 to 2020, Lehpamer played Principal Rosalie Mullins in the Australian production of School of Rock the Musical. which also toured New Zealand and China. She played Mrs Webb in Queensland Theatre's 2021 revival of Our Town

Lehpamer played Anne Hathaway, Shakespeare’s wife, in a 2024 Australian production of the musical & Juliet, alongside Rob Mills and Casey Donovan. Following her Studio Series recital The Best of Broadway and her role as host of Opera Queensland's 2024 Gala, Lehpamer performed in the solo show Amy Lehpamer Sings Cole Porter at the Opera Queensland Studio in Brisbane in August 2025.

=== Screen ===
Lehpamer's television credits include The Time of Our Lives, Winners & Losers, House Husbands, Get Krack!n, Utopia and 2010 HBO war drama miniseries The Pacific.

Together with Brent Hill, she created and starred in the musical comedy web series Donnatelegrams for ABC’s Fresh Blood initiative. She also appeared in award-winning short films Vis-à-Vis (2013) and Space: a Skate Odyssey (2020).

Lehpamer has performed on live television for ABC's Mental As fundraising special and New Year’s Eve broadcast, Nine’s Candles by Candlelight and Channel 7’s Carols in the Domain.

== Personal life ==
Lehpamer met musician and hospitality business-owner husband, Tom Cooney on dating app Bumble, in 2019. She moved to Brisbane, Queensland at the beginning of the COVID-19 pandemic to be with Cooney.

The couple were engaged in March 2021, married in November and had a son in June 2022.

== Performance credits ==
=== Stage ===
Year	Title	Role	Notes	Ref.
	Bye Bye Birdie	Kim MacAfee	Sacred Heart College, Geelong	
	West Side Story	Anita	Sacred Heart College, Geelong	
2002	Joseph and the Amazing Technicolor Dreamcoat	Narrator	Adelaide Festival Centre with Doorstep Productions	
2003	Godspell		Doorstep Productions	
2003	Fiddler on the Roof	Tevye (fiddler)	Geelong Lyric Theatre Society	
2004	Oklahoma!	Laurey	Geelong Lyric Theatre Society	
2005	Jesus Christ Superstar	Judas	University of Melbourne Music Theatre Association	
2008	Follies	Young Phyllis	State Theatre, Melbourne with The Production Company	
2008	Songs for a New World		GPAC, Geelong with Doorstep Productions	
2008–2009	Shane Warne: the Musical	Simone Callahan (understudy) / Ensemble	Melbourne Athenaeum, Regal Theatre, Perth, Enmore Theatre, Sydney with Token Events	
2009	Dirty Rotten Scoundrels	Christine Colgate	Arts Centre Melbourne with The Production Company	
2009	The 25th Annual Putnam County Spelling Bee	Marcy Park	GPAC, Geelong with Doorstep Productions	
2010	The Threepenny Opera	Sukey Tawdry	Malthouse Theatre, Melbourne with Victorian Opera	
2011	Rock of Ages	Sherrie	Comedy Theatre, Melbourne with NewTheatricals	
2012	Margaret Fulton – Queen of the Dessert	Margaret Fulton	Theatre Works, Melbourne / Present Tense	
2013	Dirty Rotten Scoundrels	Christine Colgate	Theatre Royal Sydney with James Anthony Productions	
2014	Shane Warne: The Musical	Donna Wright / Ensemble	Her Majesty's Theatre, Adelaide, Adelaide Cabaret Festival, Hamer Hall, Melbourne	
2014–2015	Once: the Musical	Reza (the violinist)	Princess Theatre, Melbourne with MTC / Gordon Frost Organisation	
2015	High Society	Tracy Lord	Hayes Theatre, Sydney	
2015	The Rocky Horror Show	Janet Weiss	Sydney Lyric with ATG / Gordon Frost Organisation	
2015–2016	The Sound of Music	Maria von Trapp	Capitol Theatre, Sydney, Lyric Theatre, Brisbane, Crown Theatre, Perth with Gordon Frost Organisation	
2016–2017	Dusty: The Musical	Dusty Springfield	Playhouse, Melbourne and Adelaide Festival Centre with The Production Company	
2017–2018	Beautiful: The Carole King Musical	Cynthia Weil	Sydney Lyric with Michael Cassel Group	
2018	The Studio: 54 Reasons to Party	Vocalist	Adelaide Festival Centre with Adelaide Symphony Orchestra	
2018	A Gentleman's Guide to Love and Murder	Sibella	Playhouse, Melbourne with The Production Company	
2018–2020	School of Rock the Musical	Principal Rosalie Mullins	Her Majesty's Theatre, Melbourne, Adelaide Festival Theatre, QPAC, Brisbane, Sydney, Auckland, China with GWB Entertainment / The Really Useful Group	
2020	An Evening with Amy Lehpamer	Solo vocalist	QPAC, Brisbane	
2021	The Who's Tommy	Mrs Walker	Palais Theatre, Melbourne with Victorian Opera	
2021	A Night on Broadway	Lead vocalist	Adelaide Showground with Adelaide Symphony Orchestra	
2021	Our Town	Mrs Webb	Queensland Theatre	
2021	The Best of Rodgers & Hammerstein	Lead vocalist	Perth Concert Hall with West Australian Symphony Orchestra	
2022	Defying Gravity concert	Vocalist	QPAC, Brisbane	
2022	Musical Theatre Gala	Vocalist	QPAC, Brisbane with Queensland Symphony Orchestra	
2023–2024	& Juliet	Anne Hathaway	Sydney Lyric, Crown Theatre, Perth, Regent Theatre, Melbourne & Asian tour with Michael Cassel Group	
2024	The Best of Broadway	Vocalist	Opera Queensland Studio	
2025	Amy Lehpamer Sings Cole Porter	Solo vocalist	Opera Queensland Studio	
2025	Kiss Me, Kate	Lilli / Kate	Foundry Theatre, Sydney with Neglected Musicals	
2025	Disco Wonderland: A Night at Studio 54	Vocalist	Hordern Pavilion with Sydney Symphony Orchestra	
2025	Dusty the Musical – In Concert	Dusty Springfield	QPAC, Brisbane with Prospero Arts	

=== Television ===
Year	Title	Role	Notes	Ref.
2007	The Pacific	Well Wisher at docks	Miniseries, 1 episode	
2012	House Husbands	BHC girl	1 episode	
2013	Winners & Losers	Scarlett Ford	1 episode	
2013	The Time of Our Lives	Esther	1 episode	
2014	Donnatelegrams	Donna	Web series	
2016	Molly	Michelle Higgins	Miniseries, 1 episode	
2017	Utopia	Sarah	Season 3, episode 7	
2018	Get Krack!n	Jane / Rachel	Season 2, 1 episode	
2023	Australian Epic (aka Stories from Oz)	Schapelle Corby / various	6 episodes	

=== Film ===
Year	Title	Role	Notes	Ref.
2013	Vis a Vis	Cindy	Short film	
2020	Space: a Skate Odyssey (aka NASA Skate)	Nancy	Short film	

== Awards ==
Year	Title	Award	Category	Result	Ref.
2002	Joseph and the Amazing Technicolor Dreamcoat	Bruce Awards (Music Theatre Guild of Victoria)	Best Female Performer in a Leading Role	Nominated	
2003	Godspell	Bruce Awards (Music Theatre Guild of Victoria)	Best Female Performer in a Supporting Role	Nominated	
2003	Fiddler on the Roof	Bruce Awards (Music Theatre Guild of Victoria)	Best Cameo Performance	Won	
2004	Oklahoma	Bruce Awards (Music Theatre Guild of Victoria)	Best Female Performer in a Leading Role	Nominated	
2005	Jesus Christ Superstar	Bruce Awards (Music Theatre Guild of Victoria)	Best Female Performer in a Leading Role	Won	
2011	Rock of Ages	theatrepeople.com.au	Best Actress in a Musical	Won	
2012	Rock of Ages	Helpmann Awards	Best Actress in a Musical	Nominated	
2012	Rock of Ages	Green Room Awards	Best Actress in a Musical	Nominated	
2013	Dirty Rotten Scoundrels	BroadwayWorld, Sydney	Best Lead Actress in a Musical	Won	
2014	Dirty Rotten Scoundrels	Sydney Theatre Awards	Best Actress in a Musical	Nominated	
2015	High Society	Glugs Theatrical Awards	Best Actress in a Musical	Nominated	
2015	Once	Helpmann Awards	Best Supporting Actress in a Musical	Nominated	
2015	The Sound of Music	Sydney Theatre Awards	Best Lead Actress in a Musical	Won	
2016	The Sound of Music	Glugs Theatrical Awards	Best Actress in a Musical	Nominated	
2016	The Sound of Music	Helpmann Awards	Best Actress in a Musical	Nominated	
2017	Dusty: The Musical	Helpmann Awards	Best Actress in a Musical	Nominated	
2017	Beautiful: The Carole King Musical	Glugs Theatrical Awards	Best Actress in a Musical	Nominated	
2018	Beautiful: The Carole King Musical	Helpmann Awards	Best Supporting Actress in a Musical	Won	
2019	School of Rock	Glugs Theatrical Awards	Best Lead Actress in a Musical	Nominated	
2020	School of Rock	Sydney Theatre Awards	Best Lead Actress in a Musical	Nominated	
2024	& Juliet	Green Room Awards	Best Lead Actress in a Musical	Nominated	
