= Ian Stenlake =

Australian actor

- Born: Ian Edward Stenlake; 5 July 1969 (age 57); Barcaldine, Queensland, Australia
- Height: 185 cm (6 ft 1 in)
- Spouse(s): Amber Mulley (2017); Rachael Beck (2001–2012)
- Children: Tahlula (born 15 January 2007); Roxie (born 19 April 2009); Scarlett (born 28 August 2019)
- Website: ianstenlake.com

Ian Edward Stenlake (born 5 July 1969 in Barcaldine, Queensland, Australia) is an Australian actor.

== Career ==
Stenlake's career began during a trip to Rome as a waiter in The Godfather Part III being filmed there.

He is perhaps best known for the role of Constable Oscar Stone in the Australian police drama series Stingers from 1998 to 2002. In 1997, he played Anthony Gibson in Emmerdale: The Dingles Down Under. He played Mike Flynn, the commanding officer of the patrol boat HMAS Hammersley, in Sea Patrol which first aired on the Nine Network in 2007. He was involved in all five seasons of the series.

Stenlake has starred in numerous other visual media, including theatre productions and cabaret shows around Australia. Ian is a member of 'The Leading Men' (Scott Irwin, Derek Metzger, Rodney Dobson, Wayne Scott Kermond, Michael Cormick, James Lee, Darryl Lovegrove), who have all played leading roles in musicals on the Australian and/or international stage.

== Filmography ==
=== Film ===
Year	Title	Role	Type
1990	The Godfather III	Waiter	Feature film
1995	Trapped in Space	Tug medic	TV movie
1997	Diana & Me		Feature film
1997	Emmerdale: The Dingles Down Under	Anthony Gibson	TV movie
2011	All the Little Pieces	Charlie	Short film
2012	The Bloke Next Door	Clayton	Short film
2013	Revolving Doors	Hotel Owner	Short film
2014	Project One Shot	Himself	Short film

=== Television ===
Year	Title	Role	Type
1997	Children's Hospital	James	TV series
1997	Murder Call	Jamie Nikolides	TV series
1998–2002	Stingers	Constable Oscar Stone	TV series, 110 episodes
2006	Natural Selection	Jason / John	TV short
2007–11	Sea Patrol	Lieutenant Commander / Commander / Captain Mike Flynn	TV series, 66 episodes
2012	Dance Academy	Gav	TV series, 1 episode
2013	Deadbeat Dads	Dr Cameron	TV series, 1 episode
2016	Sonnigsburg	Frank	TV series, 1 episode
2017	The Secret Daughter	Andrew Weston	TV series, 3 episodes
2019	Total Control	Journalist	TV series, 1 episode
2020	The Wilds	James Reid	TV series, 1 episode

== Stage ==
Year	Title	Role	Location / Company
1991	Dames at Sea		Cement Box Theatre, Brisbane
1991	Angry Housewives	Tim	La Boite Theatre
1991	P.S. Your Cat is Dead		Metro Arts, Brisbane with Jigsaw Theatre Company
1991	Queensland Youth Choir concert	Singer	State tour
1992–93	Queensland Shakespeare School's Tour		Grin+Tonic Theatre Company
1994	The Bride of Gospel Place	The Master	NIDA Parade Theatre
1994	Music Hall concert	A Wild Colonial Boy	Royal Shakespeare Theatre
1995	The Cherry Orchard	Yasha	NIDA Parade 1 Studio
1995	A Midsummer Night's Dream	Egeus / Puck / Snout	NIDA Parade Theatre
1996	Big and Little	Guitar Player / Young Man / Man	NIDA Parade Theatre
1996	The Merchant of Venice	Bassanio	NIDA Parade Theatre
1996	The Pajama Game	Joe	NIDA Parade Theatre
1997	Romeo and Juliet	Paris / Prince	EHJ Productions
1997	Romeo and Juliet	Capulet (also Director)	Celebrational Theatre Co
1998	Henry V	Ely / Grey / Pistol	Household Words Productions
1998	A Tale of Two Cities	Carton / Darney	Merivale Street Studio
2003	Cabaret	Clifford	State Theatre, Sydney, Her Majesty's Theatre, Melbourne, Lyric Theatre, South Brisbane, Burswood Theatre, Festival Theatre, Adelaide
2003	They're Playing Our Song	Vernon Gersch	State Theatre, Melbourne
2004	Eureka	Peter Lalor	Her Majesty's Theatre, Melbourne
2004	Carols in the Domain concert	Performer	Domain Gardens, Sydney
2004	Hats Off! to Sondheim		National Theatre, Melbourne
2004	Songs for.a New World concert	Singer	Adelaide Cabaret Festival with Hayes Theatre Co.
2005	First Curtain Call		Festival Theatre, Adelaide
2005	Charters Towers – The Musical	Hatter	Outside the Royal Private Hotel, Charters Towers
2005	Oklahoma!	Curly McLain	State Theatre, Melbourne with The Production Company
2005	Walkabout	Father	Chamber Made
2006	Carnival of the Animals	Narrator	Joan Sutherland Performing Arts Centre with Penrith Symphony Orchestra
2006	Kookaburra launch concert	Singer	Lyric Theatre Sydney
2006	The Pajama Game	Sid Sorokin	State Theatre, Melbourne
2006–08	Vision Australia's Carols by Candlelight	Singer	Sidney Myer Music Bowl
2007	Bravus	Singer	Hamer Hall, Melbourne
2007	Sleeping Beauty: This is Not a Lullaby	Prince Charming	Malthouse Theatre
2008	Kookaburra Gala Concert	Singer	Her Majesty's Theatre, Melbourne
2008–09	Guys & Dolls	Sky Masterson	Princess Theatre, Melbourne, Capitol Theatre, Sydney
2009	The School of Arts	Father Michael Walsh	Playhouse, QPAC, Pilbeam Theatre, Biloela Civic Centre, Mundubbera Shire Hall, Chinchilla Cultural Centre, Warwick Town Hall with Queensland Theatre Company
2009–current	The Leading Men (corporate events group)	Singer	Various events & venues
2010	Girl Crazy	Danny Churchill	Neglected Musicals
2010	Goodnight Hamer Hall	Singer	Arts Centre Melbourne with Victorian Youth Symphony Orchestra
2010	Sporting Scores!	Singer	With Melbourne Symphony Orchestra
2010	Jack! The Musical		Sydney Opera House with The Babies Proms Orchestra
2010	Late Night Lounge	Performer	Sydney Opera House
2010	Broadway Hits concert	Performer	QPAC with Queensland Pops Orchestra
2011	The Gratitude Gala Concert (Premier's Disaster Relief Appeal)	Singer	Edmund Rice Performing Arts Centre, Brisbane with Queensland Pops Orchestra
2011	Love Letters	Andrew Makepeace Ladd III	Whitehorse Centre, VIC
2011	More Than Words	Singer	Dunstan Playhouse, Adelaide for Adelaide Cabaret Festival
2011	You and I for QPAC's 12 Acts of Cabaret	Singer	QPAC, Brisbane
2011	Next to Normal	Dan	Capitol Theatre, Sydney with Griffin Theatre Company (cancelled)
2012	On Broadway Senior's Week Gala Concert	Singer	QPAC & Sydney Entertainment Centre with Queensland Pops Orchestra
2012	Symphony in the Park concert	Singer	Canberra Festival
2012	Gotta Have Heart Gala Charity Concert	Singer	Crown Melbourne
2012	Light the Night LTN'12 concert for Leukaemia research	Singer	City Recital Hall, Sydney
2013	Twisted Broadway fundraising concert	Singer	NIDA Parade Theatre
2013	Oklahoma!	Curly McLain	Harvest Rain Theatre Company
2013	Gustav Holst's The Planets	Narrator	The Concourse, Sydney with Willoughby Symphony Orchestra
2013	IGA Lord Mayor's Carols in the City	Singer	Riverstage, Brisbane
2014	Daylight Saving	Joshua Makepeace	Darlinghurst Theatre Company
2014	Truth, Beauty and a Picture of You	Anton	Hayes Theatre Co. with Neil Gooding Productions
2014	Guys & Dolls	Sky Masterson	Harvest Rain Theatre Company
2014	Morning Melodies series: The Leading Man concerts	Performer (one man show)	Wollongong Town Hall, Cairns Civic Theatre, World Theatre Charters Towers & Queensland tour
2014	Celebrity Theatresports Charity Challenge fundraiser for CanTeen	Performer	Enmore Theatre, Sydney
2014	Australian Children's Music Foundation charity concert	Singer	Chophouse Sydney
2014	Merry Christmas Concert	Singer	Twin Towns Club, Tweed Heads
2015	Caress/Ache	Dr. Mark Andersen / Adam	Stables Theatre, Sydney with Griffin Theatre Company
2015	An Audience with Smoky and Herb	Smoky Dawson	QPAC
2015–16	Georgy Girl - The Seekers Musical	John Ashby	Her Majesty's Theatre, Melbourne, State Theatre, Sydney, Crown Perth
2016	Broadbeach Opera in the Park	Singer	Kurrawa Park, Broadbeach with Gold Coast Youth Symphony Orchestra & Gold Coast Youth Choir
2016	Naughty but Nice: Christmas with Ian Stenlake (self-devised)	Performer	Frankston Arts Centre
2016–18	Around the World in 80 Days	Phileas Fogg	Alex Theatre, Melbourne, Geelong Arts Centre, Mooroolbark Community Centre, Whitehorse Centre, Clocktower Centre Moonee Ponds, Queanbeyan Performing Arts Centre, Portland Arts Centre, Glenelg, Frankston Arts Centre, Entertainment Centre Shoalhaven,Theatre Royal, Hobart, Entertainment Centre Devonport, COPAC Colac with Ellis Productions
2017	Kings of Croon (self-devised)	Actor / Singer (also Producer)	Hopgood Theatre, Adelaide (alongside Scott Irwin and Derek Metzger)
2017–18	Mamma Mia!	Sam Carmichael	Canberra Theatre, Lyric Theatre, Brisbane, Capitol Theatre, Sydney, Crown Perth, Princess Theatre Melbourne, Festival Theatre, Adelaide
2018	Hollywood Hits	Singer	With Canberra Symphony Orchestra
2020	The Bridges of Madison County	Robert Kincaid	Hayes Theatre Co
2020	Things I Could Never Tell Steven	Steven's Dad	Riverside Theatres Parrramatta
2021	One Crowded Hour: Neil Davis, Combat Cameraman	Neil Davis	Peacock Theatre, Hobart with Tasmanian Theatre Company
2022	Lloyd Webber & the Great Composers	Singer	Clocktower Centre Melbourne, Hamilton Performing Arts Centre, Wangaratta, Frankston Arts Centre, Bairnsdale. Wollongong, Merrigong Theatre Company, Swan Hill Town Hall
2023–24	Elvis - A Musical Revolution	Colonel Tom Parker	Melbourne Athenaeum, State Theatre, Sydney
2023–24	The Winner Is...	Singer	Shoalhaven Entertainment Centre, Redland Performing Arts Centre, The Drum Theatre Dandenong, Frankston Arts Centre, Twin Towns Club, Tweed Heads, Princess Theatre, Launceston with Promac Productions
	Dougal the Garbage Dump Bear		Sydney Opera House
	My Musical Life (self-devised)	Performer	

== Personal life ==
Stenlake married Amber Mulley on 4 September 2017.

Stenlake was previously married to Australian musical theatre star Rachael Beck until 2012. Their daughter Tahlula was born on 15 January 2007. Their second child, Roxie, was born on 19 April 2009.

== Awards and nominations ==
Award	Category	Production	Role	Year	Result
Helpmann Awards	Best Male Actor in a Musical	Oklahoma!	Curly	2006	Nominated
Green Room Awards	Best Male Artist in a Leading Role	Oklahoma!	Curly	2005	Won
Green Room Awards	Best Male Artist in a Leading Role	They're Playing Our Song	Vernon Gersch	2003	Won
Green Room Awards	Best Male Artist in a Leading Role	Cabaret	Cliff	2003	Nominated
Green Room Awards	Best Male Artist in a Leading Role	Eureka	Peter Lalor	2004	Nominated
