= Soulmates (play) =

Play by David Williamson

Birthrights / Soulmates
- Author: David Williamson
- Cover artist: Design: Kate Florance. Cover image shows: William Zappa as Danny and Jacki Weaver as Heather in the 2002 Sydney Theatre Company production of Soulmates. Photo: Tracey Schramm.
- Language: English
- Genre: Play
- Publisher: Currency Press
- Publication date: 2003
- Publication place: Australia
- Media type: Print (Paperback)
- ISBN: 978-0-86819-698-5

Soulmates is a play by Australian playwright David Williamson, published by Currency Press and set in the world of publishing.

Among the people satires are a critic, which was seen as a reflection of Williamson's battles with the critics over a long period of time.

Williamson later said he was "surprised that no one picked up Soulmates" for a film. "It worked very well with audiences on stage and is a classic revenge story."

== Plot ==
Set in Melbourne and New York, this is a tale of revenge as the best-selling expatriate author Katie Best engineers a scheme to bring her critic, Danny O'Loughlin, undone.

== First Production ==
Soulmates was first produced by Sydney Theatre Company, at the Drama Theatre, Sydney Opera House, on 13 April 2002 with the following cast:

- HEATHER: Jacki Weaver
- DANNY: William Zappa
- KATIE: Amanda Muggleton
- GORDON: Barry Quin
- FIONA: Deborah Kennedy
- GREG: Jonathan Biggins
- MAX: Sean Taylor
- ATTENDANT: Ben Fransham

Director, Gale Edwards

Set Designer, Brian Thomson

Lighting Designer, John Rayment

Sound Design, Paul Charlier

Assistant Director, Annabel Scholes
