= Eureka (musical) =

2004 Australian musical

- Music: Michael Maurice Harvey
- Lyrics: John Senczuk, Gale Edwards and Maggie May Gordon
- Book: Gale Edwards & John Senczuk
- Productions: 2004 Melbourne

Eureka (also called Eureka!) is an Australian musical with music by Michael Maurice Harvey, book and lyrics by Gale Edwards and John Senczuk and original book and lyrics by Maggie May Gordon. The musical is set in Victoria during the Eureka Rebellion of 1854, covering the tensions between immigrant gold miners from many cultures and the British colonial authorities. The original Australian production played in Melbourne in 2004 at Her Majesty's Theatre. It was nominated for the Helpmann Award for Best Musical in 2005.

== Development ==
Maggie May Gordon, a bush poet and writer from Trangie in outback New South Wales, developed the original book and lyrics for Eureka during the 1980s and 1990s. Gordon approached composer Michael Harvey to collaborate with her in 1999. Harvey had been suggested to Gordon by singer Normie Rowe. In November 2000, they held a 2-day workshop in Sydney with a cast including Barry Crocker (who later featured in the full production). Further readings and rewrites were followed by a concert version produced by Harvey that visited theatres in Queensland regional cities over two weeks from 12 to 24 August 2003. Positive reactions to the concert tour assisted in raising the investment for the Melbourne production. Simon Gallagher joined Michael Harvey as co-producer.

The addition of Gale Edwards as director led to considerable further development through re-writing, revision and workshops. Edwards and co-writer John Senczuk delivered a first draft of a revised book, based on the original work of Maggie May Gordon, in January 2004. The new book fleshed out the relationships, introduced new characters, and expanded the storyline, which necessitated several new songs. Large-scale revision of book and score continued through 2004, including through a 3-week workshop in March 2004 and a further 2-week workshop in July 2004.

== Production ==
Following previews beginning 28 September 2004, Eureka opened in Melbourne on 8 October 2004 at Her Majesty's Theatre, produced by Harvey and Gallagher as part of the Melbourne International Festival of the Arts. Gale Edwards directed with choreography by Tony Bartuccio and musical direction by Michael Tyack. The set design was by Peter England, costume design by Gabriella Tylesova and lighting by Trudy Dalgliesh.

The main cast included Ian Stenlake (Peter Lalor), Trisha Crowe (Bridie O'Malley), Simon Gleeson (Sean Flynn), Rachael Beck (Alicia Dunn), Barry Crocker (Paddy O'Malley), Amanda Muggleton (Mercedes Cortez), Peter Carroll (Sir Charles Hotham), Nancye Hayes (Lady Hotham), Michael Cormick (Commissioner Grey), Yang Li (Long Tu) and Pauline Whyman (Kardinia).

Due to weak ticket sales, the musical closed early on 28 November 2004, a week before the 150th anniversary of the battle of the Eureka Stockade.

== Reception ==
Critical reception was mixed to positive.

The Age stated that "this distinctively Australian subject, with heroes and villains, oppression and revolution, romance and sacrifice, well acted, staged with flair, set to pleasing music and featuring some exceptional singing, has something for just about everyone". "The book...sketches the miners' revolt against crippling licence fees in big, bold strokes and moves at a cracking pace under Edwards' disciplined, assured direction. ...The score, for which Les Miserables was undoubtedly the template, is more than serviceable music theatre, running the gamut from robust choruses to love songs and music hall ribaldry, a wonderful Toorak Waltz to a lively Irish jig."

The Bulletin said that "with never a dull moment and leaving not a dry eye in the house, the creative team ... has excelled at making personal entanglements carry broader issues without trivialising either. ... This is a Eureka! for our times, wearing its black armband with dignity, never despair, pointing through how we once were to what we might make of ourselves."

Variety called the musical a "blandly generic epic" that "despite its considerable technical merits and stellar performance highlights ...seems unlikely to enter the annals of Australian musical theater as a great discovery".

== Cast ==
2004 Melbourne Production

- Ian Stenlake as Peter Lalor
- Trisha Crowe as Bridie O'Malley
- Barry Crocker as Paddy O'Malley
- Amanda Muggleton as Mercedes Cortez
- Simon Gleeson as Sean Flynn
- Rachael Beck as Alicia Dunn
- Peter Carroll as Sir Charles Hotham
- Nancye Hayes as Lady Hotham
- Michael Cormick as Commissioner Grey
- Yang Li as Long Tu
- Pauline Whyman as Kardinia

Original November 2000 workshop cast

- Barry Crocker
- Rob Guest
- Judy Guest
- Ric Lau
- Russell Newman
- Michelle Doake
- Katy Manning (Director)

== Awards ==
Eureka was nominated for the 2005 Helpmann Award for Best Musical. Amanda Muggleston won the Helpmann Award for Best Female Actor in a Supporting Role in a Musical.

Eureka was also nominated for six 2004 Melbourne Green Room Awards for music theatre, with Trudy Dalgleish's lighting winning for Technical Design. Other nominations were for Choreography (Tony Bartuccio), Musical Direction (Michael Tyack), Male Artist in a Leading Role (Ian Stenlake), Male Artist in a Supporting Role (Barry Crocker) and Creative Design (Peter England, set design).
