= Helpmann Award for Best Female Actor in a Supporting Role in a Musical =

Annual Australian musical theatre award

- Awarded for: Best Female Actor in a Supporting Role in a Musical
- Location: Australia
- Presented by: Live Performance Australia
- Currently held by: Amy Lehpamer for Beautiful: The Carole King Musical (2018)
- Website: HelpmannAwards.com.au

The Helpmann Award for Best Female Actor in a Supporting Role in a Musical is a musical award, presented by Live Performance Australia (LPA) at the annual Helpmann Awards since 2001. This is a list of winners and nominations for the Helpmann Award for Best Female Actor in a Supporting Role in a Musical.

== Winners and nominees ==
Winners are listed first and marked in a separate colour.

=== 2000s ===
Year	Actor	Production	Character(s)
2003 (3rd)
2003 (3rd)	Nadine Garner	Cabaret	Fraulein Kost and Kit Kat Girl
2003 (3rd)	Judi Connelli	Cabaret	Fräulein Schneider
2003 (3rd)	Geraldine Turner	The Witches of Eastwick	Felicia Gabriel
2003 (3rd)	Queenie van de Zandt	Oliver!	Mrs Sowerberry
2004 (4th)
2004 (4th)	Amanda Harrison	We Will Rock You	Oz
2004 (4th)	Paula Arundell	The Threepenny Opera	Low-Dive Jenny
2004 (4th)	Cherine Peck	The Lion King	Shenzi
2004 (4th)	Prinnie Stevens	Oh! What A Night	Cat
2005 (5th)
2005 (5th)	Amanda Muggleton	Eureka!	Mercedes Cortez
2005 (5th)	Monique Montez	Saturday Night Fever	Annette
2005 (5th)	Christen O'Leary	Urinetown	Little Sally
2005 (5th)	Meredith O'Reilly	The Producers	Hold Me-Touch Me
2006 (6th)
2006 (6th)	Christen O'Leary	The 25th Annual Putnam County Spelling Bee	Logainne Schwartzandgrubenierre
2006 (6th)	Alexis Fishman	Dusty – The Original Pop Diva	Mary O'Brien
2006 (6th)	Jodie Gillies	Summer Rain	Renie McKenna
2006 (6th)	Deni Hines	Dusty – The Original Pop Diva	Reno
2007 (7th)
2007 (7th)	Colleen Hewett	The Boy from Oz	Marion Allen
2007 (7th)	Robyn Arthur	Sideshow Alley	Tiny
2007 (7th)	Genevieve Lemon	Priscilla, Queen of the Desert	Shirley
2007 (7th)	Trisha Noble	Pippin	Berthe
2008 (8th)
2008 (8th)	Sharon Millerchip	The Rocky Horror Show	Columbia
2008 (8th)	Colette Mann	Priscilla, Queen of the Desert	Shirley
2008 (8th)	Lola Nixon	Billy Elliot the Musical	Grandma
2008 (8th)	Jackie Rees	The Phantom of the Opera	Madame Giry
2009 (9th)
2009 (9th)	Nancye Hayes	My Fair Lady	Mrs Higgins
2009 (9th)	Maggie Kirkpatrick	Wicked	Madame Morrible
2009 (9th)	Gina Riley	Chicago	Matron Mama Morton
2009 (9th)	Ursula Yovich	Jerry Springer: The Opera	Andrea and Archangel Michel

=== 2010s ===
Year	Actor	Production	Character(s)
2010 (10th)
2010 (10th)	Christina O'Neill	Avenue Q	Christmas Eve
2010 (10th)	Lisa Adam	Jersey Boys	Mary Delgado
2010 (10th)	Jude Henshall	The Wizard Of Oz	Glinda the Good Witch
2010 (10th)	Jaz Flowers	Fame	Mabel Washington
2011 (11th)
2011 (11th)	Esther Hannaford	Hairspray	Penny Pingleton
2011 (11th)	Alinta Chidzey	West Side Story	Anita
2011 (11th)	Marina Prior	Mary Poppins	Mrs Banks
2011 (11th)	Taneel Van Zyl	Doctor Zhivago	Tonia
2012 (12th)
2012 (12th)	Nancye Hayes	Grey Gardens	Edith Bouvier Beale
2012 (12th)	Francine Cain	Rock of Ages	Regina
2012 (12th)	Debora Krizak	A Chorus Line	Sheila Bryant
2012 (12th)	Tara Morice	Fat Swan	Barbara Hershey Bar
2013 (13th)
2013 (13th)	Helen Dallimore	Legally Blonde	Paulette Bonafonté
2013 (13th)	Erika Heynatz	Legally Blonde	Brooke Wyndham
2013 (13th)	Katrina Retallick	The Addams Family	Alice Beineke
2013 (13th)	Jennifer Vuletic	Chitty Chitty Bang Bang	Baroness Bomburst
2014 (14th)
2014 (14th)	Heather Mitchell	Strictly Ballroom The Musical	Shirley Hastings
2014 (14th)	Debora Krizak	Sweet Charity	Ursula
2014 (14th)	Shu-Cheen Yu	The King and I	Lady Thiang
2014 (14th)	Lucy Maunder	Grease	Rizzo
2015 (15th)
2015 (15th)	Kerrie Anne Greenland	Les Misérables	Éponine
2015 (15th)	Claire Lyon	Anything Goes	Hope Hartcourt
2015 (15th)	Lucy Maunder	Into the Woods	Cinderella
2015 (15th)	Amy Lehpamer	Once	Reza
2016 (16th)
2016 (16th)	Elise McCann	Matilda the Musical	Miss Honey
2016 (16th)	Wendy Mae Brown	Ghost the Musical	Oda Mae Brown
2016 (16th)	Erika Heynatz	Singin' in the Rain	Lina Lamont
2016 (16th)	Jacqueline Dark	The Sound of Music	Mother Abbess
2017 (17th)
2017 (17th)	Robyn Nevin	My Fair Lady	Mrs Higgins
2017 (17th)	Teagan Wouters	Kinky Boots	Nicola
2017 (17th)	Lucy Maunder	Matilda the Musical	Miss Honey
2017 (17th)	Phoebe Panaretos	Green Day's American Idiot	Whatsername
2018 (18th)
2018 (18th)	Amy Lehpamer	Beautiful: The Carole King Musical	Cynthia Weil
2018 (18th)	Jemma Rix	The Wizard of Oz	Wicked Witch of the West
2018 (18th)	Christie Whelan Browne	Muriel's Wedding	Tania Degano
2018 (18th)	Madeleine Jones	Muriel's Wedding	Rhonda
2019 (19th)
2019 (19th)	Elaine Crombie	Barbara and the Camp Dogs	Rene
2019 (19th)	Lucy Maunder	Roald Dahl's Charlie and the Chocolate Factory	Mrs Bucket
2019 (19th)	Pippa Grandison	Muriel's Wedding the Musical	Betty Heslop
2019 (19th)	Karli Dinardo	Handa Opera on Sydney Harbour: West Side Story	Anita

== See also ==
- Helpmann Awards
