= Bob Bertles =

- Born: 6 March 1939; Melbourne, Victoria, Australia
- Died: 30 December 2024 (aged 85)
- Occupations: Musician (as instrumentalist, bandleader)
- Instruments: Alto saxophone; tenor saxophone; baritone saxophone
- Spouse: Nancye Hayes

Bob Bertles (6 March 1939 – 30 December 2024) was an Australian jazz alto, tenor and baritone saxophonist and bandleader.

== Life and career ==
Bertles was born in Melbourne on 6 March 1939. A self-taught musician, Bertles in the late 1950s and early 60s was a member of the developing modern jazz scene that grew out of venues like the Mocambo in Newtown and the El Rocco Jazz Cellar in Sydney's Kings Cross.

Active in clubs, on TV, as a session musician and on the pop-rock scene, he toured with Johnny O'Keefe.

In 1967 Bertles temporarily joined Sydney-based rock-soul band Max Merritt & The Meteors. Only weeks after joining, Bertles, Merritt and drummer Stewie Speer narrowly escaped death after their van collided head-on with a truck on the way to a country dance; all three were seriously injured and Bertles was left with a permanent limp. In 1974, after the group split, Bertles joined Ian Carr's Nucleus.

In later years Bertles toured Europe extensively, joined the orchestra for the Australian production of the stage musical Chicago, where he met his future wife, theatre performer Nancye Hayes.

In addition to regular concerts, festivals, session work, and touring, Bertles' later projects included recording and live performances with Sydney's renowned Ten Part Invention.

Bertles died on 30 December 2024, at the age of 85.

== Discography ==
=== Albums ===
List of albums, with selected details
Title	Details
Rhythm of the Heart	Released: 1995; Format: CD; Label: Rufus Records (RF017)
Cool Beans	Released: 1998; Format: CD; Label: Rufus Records (RF038)

== Awards and nominations ==
=== ARIA Music Awards ===
The ARIA Music Awards is an annual awards ceremony that recognises excellence, innovation, and achievement across all genres of Australian music. They commenced in 1987.

Year	Nominee / work	Award	Result	Ref.
1996	Rhythm of the Heart	Best Jazz Album	Nominated	
