= Idiot Box (film) =

- Directed by: David Caesar
- Written by: David Caesar
- Produced by: Nicki Roller; Glenys Rowe
- Starring: Ben Mendelsohn; Jeremy Sims; Robyn Loau; Celia Ireland; Graeme Blundell
- Cinematography: Joseph Pickering
- Edited by: Mark Perry
- Music by: Tim Rogers
- Distributed by: UIP/Globe
- Release dates: September 8, 1996 (Toronto International Film Festival); February 20, 1997 (Australia)
- Running time: 85 minutes
- Country: Australia
- Language: English
- Budget: A$2.5 million
- Box office: A$837,689 (Australia)

Idiot Box is a 1996 Australian film starring Ben Mendelsohn and Jeremy Sims. Set in (around 1980's or 90's) middle-class urban Australian youth and young adults culture with local criminal well-to-do's and widespread general unemployment. The story viewing is shown from the private and illicit side of the activity of friends turning to crime by personal circumstance, all the way to the nitty-gritty of sand-shoes and caring considerate criminals' sincerity. Idiot Box is another "era" Australian "bank robber film" entwined with a wry sense of humour.

At the 1997 ARIA Music Awards, the soundtrack was nominated for Best Original Soundtrack, Cast, or Show Album.

== Cast ==
- Ben Mendelsohn as Kev
- Jeremy Sims as Mick
- Susie Porter as Betty
- Robyn Loau as Lani
- John Polson as Jonah
- Amanda Muggleton as Mum
- Paul Gleeson as Terry
- Susan Prior as Luce
- Graeme Blundell as Detective Eric
- Deborah Kennedy as Detective Leanne
- Peter Browne as Sergeant
- David Wenham as Bank Teller
- Celia Ireland as Barmaid
- Darren Gilshenan as C.E.S. Man
- Richard Carter as Big Bloke

== Plot ==
The story follows two fictional characters Mick (Jeremy Sims) and Kev (Ben Mendelsohn) who have nothing to offer. They are stereotypical bogans with a taste for cheap thrills. Kev's hobby is being angry, his motto is "Maximum fear, minimum time". He is unemployed with "attitude", an antagonistic manner. Mick is his best friend ("mate") and together they kill time drinking beer, watching the Idiot Box and looking for action on the street.

One day Kev tells Mick they have drawn their last dole cheque. Instead of giving in to their limited circumstances, they are going to get rich quick doing the only thing they are qualified for - crime. Conning a friend into driving the getaway car, the gang of three plan a bank robbery. But it is a heist that is doomed from the start when professional criminals target the same bank.

== Production ==
The film's writer-director David Caesar said:

I think that Idiot Box is about two young men who are doing the best they can with the resources available to them. Now, the fact that the resource available, as far as they're concerned, is robbing a bank doesn't change the fact that it's still about them trying, basically not giving up. I'm surprised that people haven't come down on me for saying, 'Oh, this is going to promote people robbing banks.' The issue with the film, from my point of view, is that it was about people who hadn't given in to their circumstances.

== Box office ==
Idiot Box opened on 42 screens in Australia and placed tenth at the Australian box office with a gross of A$278,769 for the week and went on to gross A$837,689 at the box office in Australia.

== Home media ==
Idiot Box was released on DVD by Umbrella Entertainment in March 2012. The DVD is compatible with all region codes and includes special features such as the theatrical trailer, behind the scenes, the screenplay and audio commentary with David Caesar and Glenys Rowe.

== See also ==
- Cinema of Australia
