= Gale Edwards =

Australian theatre director (born 1954)

Gale Edwards AM
- Born: 14 November 1954 (age 71); Australia
- Occupations: Theatre director; playwright; lyricist; television and film director

Annette Gale Edwards AM (born 14 November 1954) is an Australian theatre director, who has worked extensively throughout Australia and internationally. She has also directed for television and film.

== Professional career ==
Edwards began her career at Adelaide youth theatre company Energy Connection. From 1986 to 1989, she was associate director of the State Theatre Company of South Australia, has been an Artistic Director of the Melbourne Theatre Company, she has worked with every other major Australian theatre company, including the Sydney Theatre Company and Opera Australia.

Internationally, Edwards directed the 1996 London revival of Jesus Christ Superstar, which opened at the Ford Center for the Performing Arts on Broadway in 2000. The production was nominated for Tony Award for Best Revival of a Musical. She also codirected, with Nick Morris, a Great Performances TV adaptation of the production, which premiered in the UK in 2000.

Edwards contributed to the book of the musical Whistle Down the Wind, for which she directed the West End production. She directed Shakespeare's The Merchant of Venice and A Midsummer Night's Dream at the Chichester Festival Theatre in 2003 and 2004 respectively.

Edwards has directed for the Royal Shakespeare Company and Shakespeare Theatre Company (Washington D.C.). She directed the premiere production of The Boy from Oz. For Opera Australia, she directed Aida (2015), La bohème (2016–2023), Carmen (2017), Salome (2019).

She co-wrote the book and lyrics of the musical Eureka, which premiered in Melbourne in 2004.

Edwards'credits directing for film and television include the 2011 Australian film A Heartbeat Away and the "Pride" segment of 1993 television series Seven Deadly Sins, as well as filmed versions of stage presentations.

== Awards ==
Edwards has been the recipient of three Sydney Critics Circle Awards, four Melbourne Green Room Awards (most recently for her 2012 production of Chess for The Production Company), an International Emmy, two Helpmann Awards (Best Direction of a Musical for The Boy From Oz and Sweeney Todd), a Sydney Critics Award, two nominations for Helen Hayes Awards in Washington D.C., and a 2000 Centenary Medal 'for Service to Australian Society'.

Edwards was made a member of the Order of Australia (AM) in the 2017 Queen's Birthday Honours.

=== Mo Awards ===
The Australian Entertainment Mo Awards (commonly known informally as the Mo Awards), were annual Australian entertainment industry awards. They recognise achievements in live entertainment in Australia from 1975 to 2016. Gale Edwards won two awards in that time.

Year	Nominee / work	Award	Result (wins only)
1992	Gale Edwards	Outstanding Contribution to Musical Theatre	Won
1999	Gale Edwards	Outstanding Contribution to Musical Theatre	Won
