= Michael Cormick =

Australian singer and actor

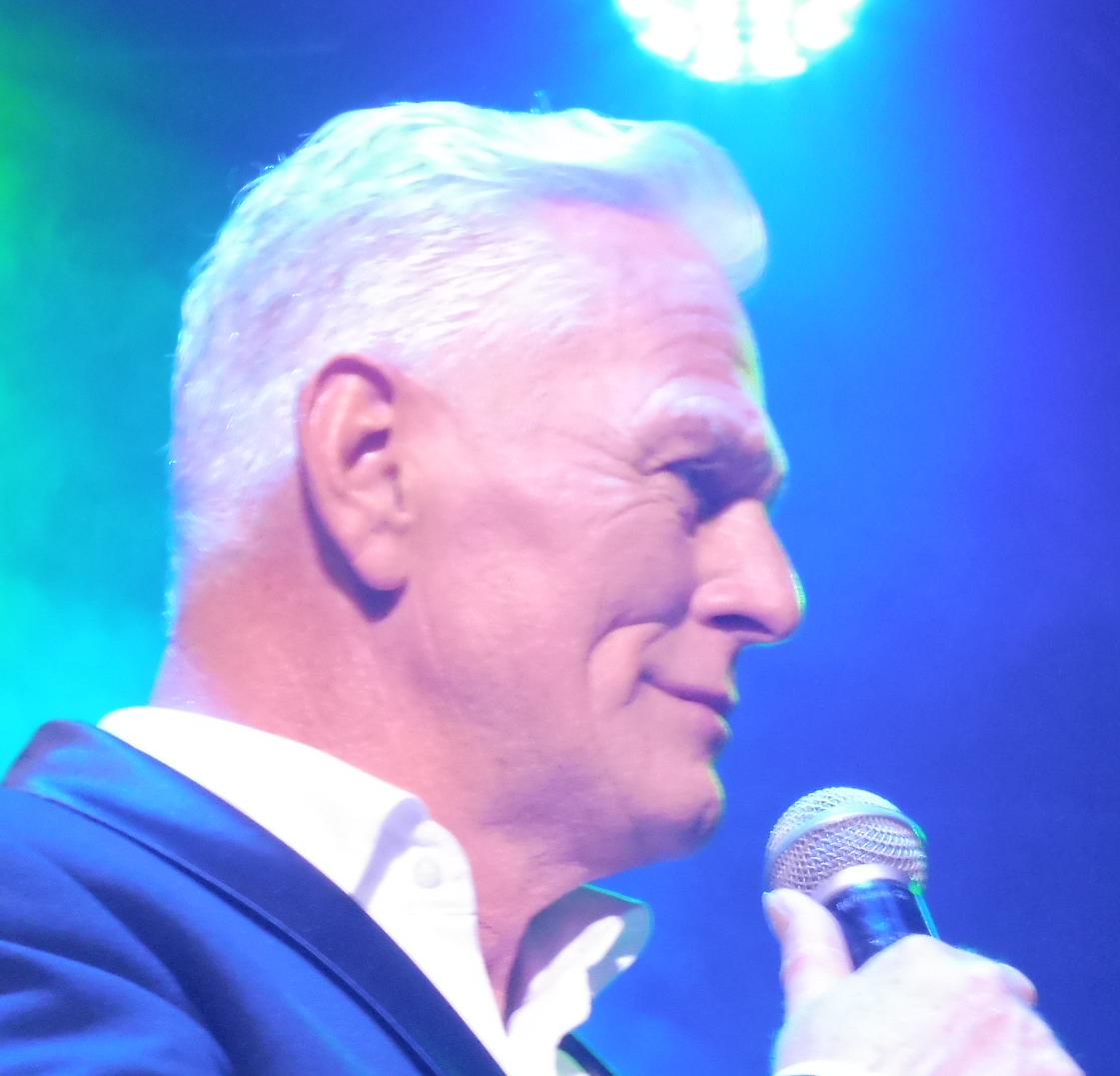
Michael Cormick, 2025

Michael Cormick is an Australian singer and actor, best known for performances in musical theatre in Australia and in the United Kingdom. In Australia, he originated the role of the Beast in the original Australian production of Beauty and the Beast opposite Hugh Jackman as Gaston and Rachael Beck as Belle. His other Australia stage credits include The Phantom and Monsieur Firmin in The Phantom of the Opera, Munkustrap in Cats, Joe in Sunset Boulevard, Levi and the Pharaoh in Joseph and the Amazing Technicolor Dreamcoat, Sam in Mamma Mia!, Commissioner Grey in Eureka, Georges in La Cage aux Folles, and The Narrator in Blood Brothers. He replaced Robert Grubb as Max in Sunset Boulevard opposite Sarah Brightman.

In the West End, his roles include Viscount Raoul de Chagny in The Phantom of the Opera (1988–1991, Her Majesty's Theatre), Sir Percival Glyde in The Woman in White (2005, Palace Theatre), and Wild Bill Hickok in Calamity Jane (2003, Shaftesbury Theatre).

In 2026 he toured nationally with Marina Prior, David Hobson and Silvie Paladino in a show titled Ovation.

== Awards ==
=== Mo Awards ===
The Australian Entertainment Mo Awards were annual Australian entertainment industry awards. They recognise achievements in live entertainment in Australia from 1975 to 2016.

Year	Nominee / work	Award	Result (wins only)
1996	Michael Cormick for Beauty and the Beast	Male Musical Theatre Performer of the Year	Won
