= Marian Street Theatre =

Street theatre in Killara, New South Wales, Australia

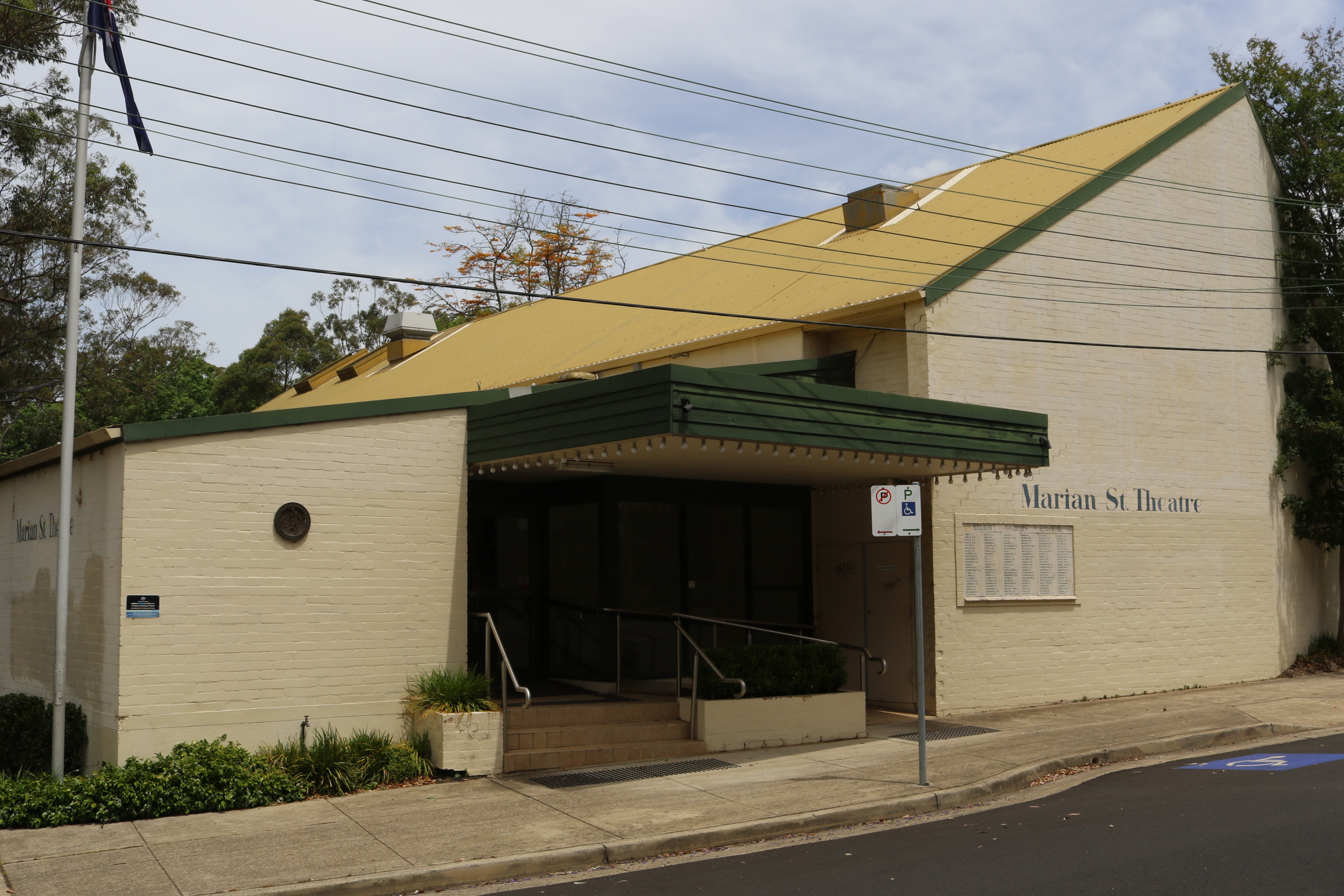

- Location within Sydney
- Address: 2 Marian Street, Killara, New South Wales, Australia
- Coordinates: 33.766757°S 151.161326°E
- Owner: Ku-ring-gai Council
- Capacity: 400
- Type: Theatre
- Public transit: Killara railway station

Construction
- Built: 1906
- Opened: 1966
- Closed: 2026
- Architect: Oliver Harley
- Builder: Mr Gazzard

Website
- Marian Street Theatre for Young People

Marian Street Theatre is located in Killara, a suburb on the North Shore of Sydney, New South Wales, Australia. From its establishment until 2013, the theatre played a significant role in the cultural life of the North Shore.

Built in 1906 as a Soldiers Memorial Hall, it was used as a community hall up until 1966. Hosting dances, parties, lectures, drama performances, Polio vaccines and school breakups. In 1948, the actress Vivien Leigh opened a flower show at Marian Street. In 1966 the building was opened as The Community Theatre, Killara, by the English born actor, Alexander Archdale.

Seating was increased from 311 to 400 in 1980. For safety reasons, the theatre temporarily closed in 2013 with Ku-ring-gai Council approving plans to modernise the venue in 2020 these plans were due to lapse in August 2026 following another vote, citing concerns that the cost of the redevelopment had risen to $30.3 million as of 2024. Following a community rally in support of revitalising Marian Street Theatre, $100,000 was raised over ten days to kickstart minor works on the venue to keep the plans for redevelopment of the theatre alive.

Artistic directors included Peter Collingwood, Aarne Neeme, John Krummel, Noel Ferrier and Alastair Duncan. Prominent actors who have performed at Marian Street include Leonard Teale, Stuart Wagstaff, Ruth Cracknell, Helen Morse, Ron Haddrick, Noel Hodda, Joan Bruce, Anne Haddy and Nancye Hayes.
