= Glugs Theatrical Awards =

Australian stage awards based in Sydney

The Glugs Theatrical Awards, also referred to as the Glugs Theatre Awards and sometimes capitalised as GLUGS, were annual awards given by a group of theatre-lovers in Sydney, Australia, The Glugs.

== Background ==
The Glugs were established in 1969, created by a group of people including theatre critics, journalists, actors, and regular patrons of theatrical performances. The group, which included theatre critic Norman Kessell, publicisit Bill Fenn, press officer for J. C. Williamson's John Love, and ABC producer Allan Kendall, had been meeting for lunch semi-regularly since 1966. The group was named "The Glugs" by British-Canadian actor Barry Morse, after they had presented him with a copy of The Glugs of Gosh, a collection of poems by Australian poet C. J. Dennis, as a gift. They were at first a private group, with their lunch meetings spread by word-of-mouth.

== People ==
In 2015, Lee Young, aged 86, was "Chief Glug", while Beverley Davies, aged 78, was the group's co-ordinator. At that time membership was around 80 members.

In 2016, Bill Winspear was Chief Glug.

Peter Binning was appointed Chief Glug in 2021, but died in November of that year.

== Awards ==
The Glugs presented their first award in 1973, the Glugs Theatrical Award for Contribution to Theatre, which was presented to David Williamson. Various other categories and named or special awards were added and dropped from the 1980s onwards. Some of these included:

- Norman Kessell Memorial Award for Contribution to Theatre (1987–1993)
- Norman Kessell Memorial Award for Outstanding Performance – Actress (1994–?)
- Norman Kessell Memorial Award for Outstanding Performance – Actor (1994–?)
- Hayes Gordon Memorial Award for Important Contribution to Theatre (1999–?; after Hayes Gordon)
- Chief Glug's Award for Excellence Behind the Scenes (1992–?)
- Colleen Clifford Memorial Award Outstanding Performance in a Musical or Special Comedy Satire (1997–?; after Colleen Clifford (1898–1996))
- Taffy Davies Memorial Award For Best New Australian Play (1999–?)
- Outstanding Production Critic's Choice (1996–2004); renamed Glugs' Choice (2005–); then Robert Davies Memorial Award (2011–?)
- Jeffry Joynton-Smith Memorial Award Young Performer "On the Way" (1991–2005; after Jeffry Joynton-Smith AM, GM/CEO of the Australian Elizabethan Theatre Trust 1969–1984)
- Jeffry Joynton-Smith Memorial Award for Best Supporting Actors (2007–?)
- SBW Foundation – Life Achievement Award, later Rodney Seaborn Memorial Lifetime Achievement Award (1991–2019; awarded to Rodney Seaborn in 1997) (funded by the Seaborn, Broughton & Walford Foundation

The awards are chosen by The Glugs membership, and are widely covered by theatrical press.

The last awards reported were the 2019 awards, awarded in 2020. Nancye Hayes was given the SBW Foundation Life Achievement Award.
