= Playbox Theatre, Melbourne =

- Interactive map of Playbox Theatre, Melbourne
- Address: 53-55 Exhibition Street
- Location: Melbourne, Victoria
- Coordinates: 37°48′53″S 144°58′17″E

Construction
- Built: 1927
- Opened: 1969
- Demolished: 1984

The Playbox Theatre was a theatre located at 53-55 Exhibition Street in Melbourne, Australia, from 1969 to 1984. It became the home of the Playbox Theatre Company, previously Hoopla! and later Malthouse Theatre.

== History ==
The theatre seating around 300 people was established by entrepreneurs Kenn Brodziak and Harry M. Miller, converted from the former Kelvin Hall built in 1927. It opened in June 1969 with the controversial play The Boys in the Band. Plays and musicals at the theatre in the early 1970s included Butterflies Are Free, Juggler's Three and Godspell.

The Australian Film Institute leased the theatre for two years from mid-1974 to mid-1976.

In 1977, the Playbox Theatre became the home of theatre company Hoopla!, which changed its name to the Playbox Theatre Company.

A second smaller 80-seat theatre, the Playbox Upstairs, was established in the building in 1978, with the original theatre called the Playbox Downstairs.

The theatre was destroyed by a fire in February 1984. The building was later rebuilt as offices with the heritage stone facade retained.
