= State Theatre (Melbourne) =

Theatre in Melbourne, Victoria, Australia

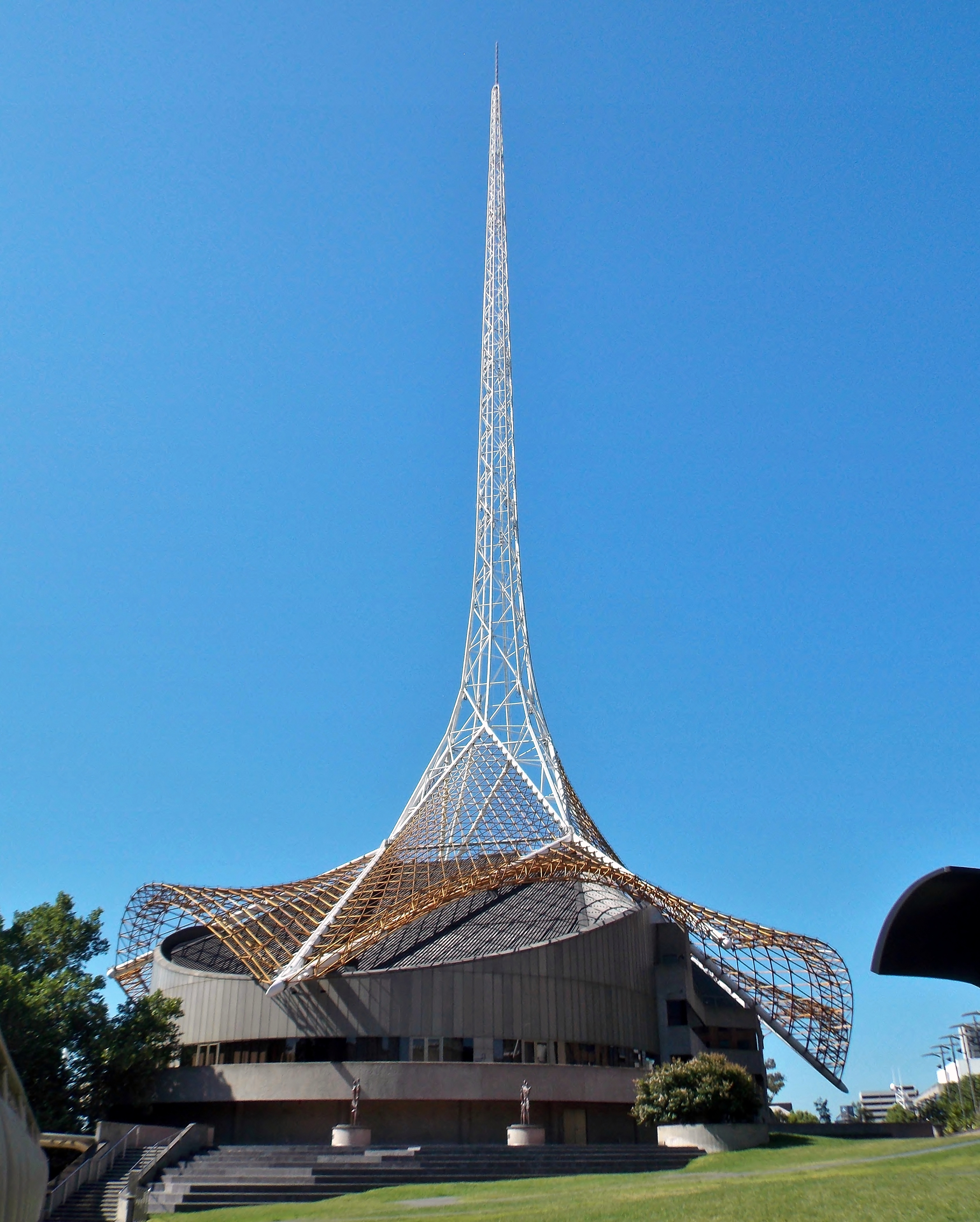
- Interactive map of State Theatre
- Address: 100 St Kilda Road, Southbank; Melbourne; Australia
- Coordinates: 37°49′17″S 144°58′7″E
- Owner: Victorian Arts Centre Trust
- Capacity: 2079
- Current use: Live Theatre, Opera, Ballet, Dance

Construction
- Opened: October 1984
- Architect: Roy Grounds

Website
- www.artscentremelbourne.com.au

The State Theatre opened in 1984 and is part of the Arts Centre Melbourne located by the Yarra River and St Kilda Road. Like the other performance venues within the Arts Centre, the State Theatre is underground. It has over 2,000 seats and its stage is one of the largest in the world.

The State Theatre is typically used as a venue for ballet, opera and musical theatre.

The first performances in the State Theatre were Fiddler on the Roof by Opera Australia in May 1984, and the John Copley production of Verdi's Don Carlos in by the Victoria State Opera in August.

Opera Australia and The Australian Ballet each use the State Theatre as their main Melbourne venue. It was also used by The Production Company for short seasons of musical theatre prior to its closure for refreshment and subsequent shut down of The Production Company.

Over summer, the State Theatre usually hosts a major musical or large-scale theatre production. Notable summer productions have included The Life and Adventures of Nicholas Nickleby, My Fair Lady, The King and I, Joseph and the Amazing Technicolor Dreamcoat, Hello, Dolly!, H.M.S. Pinafore, Dusty, War Horse, Dream Lover and Evita.

== Gallery ==
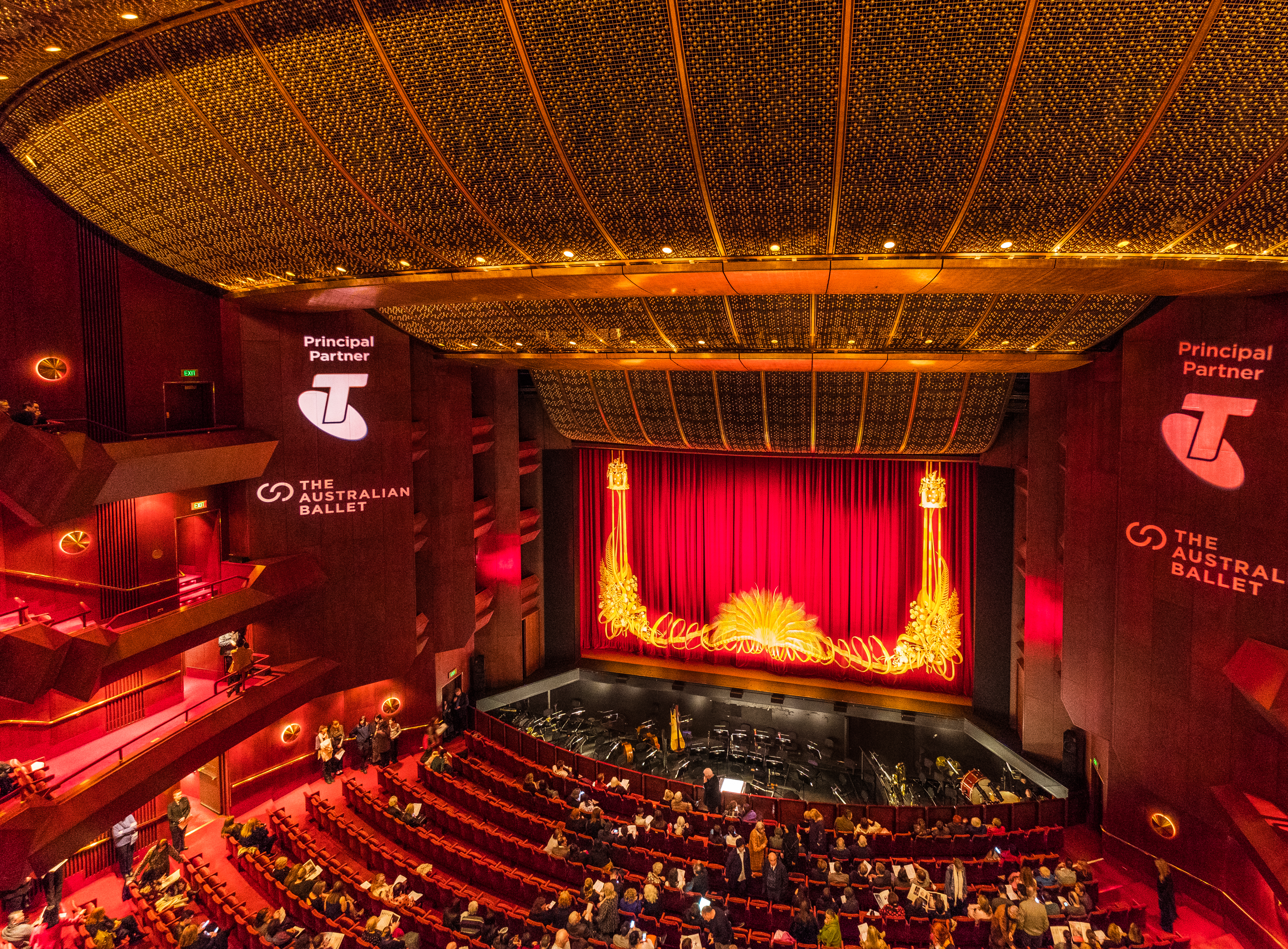
Interior

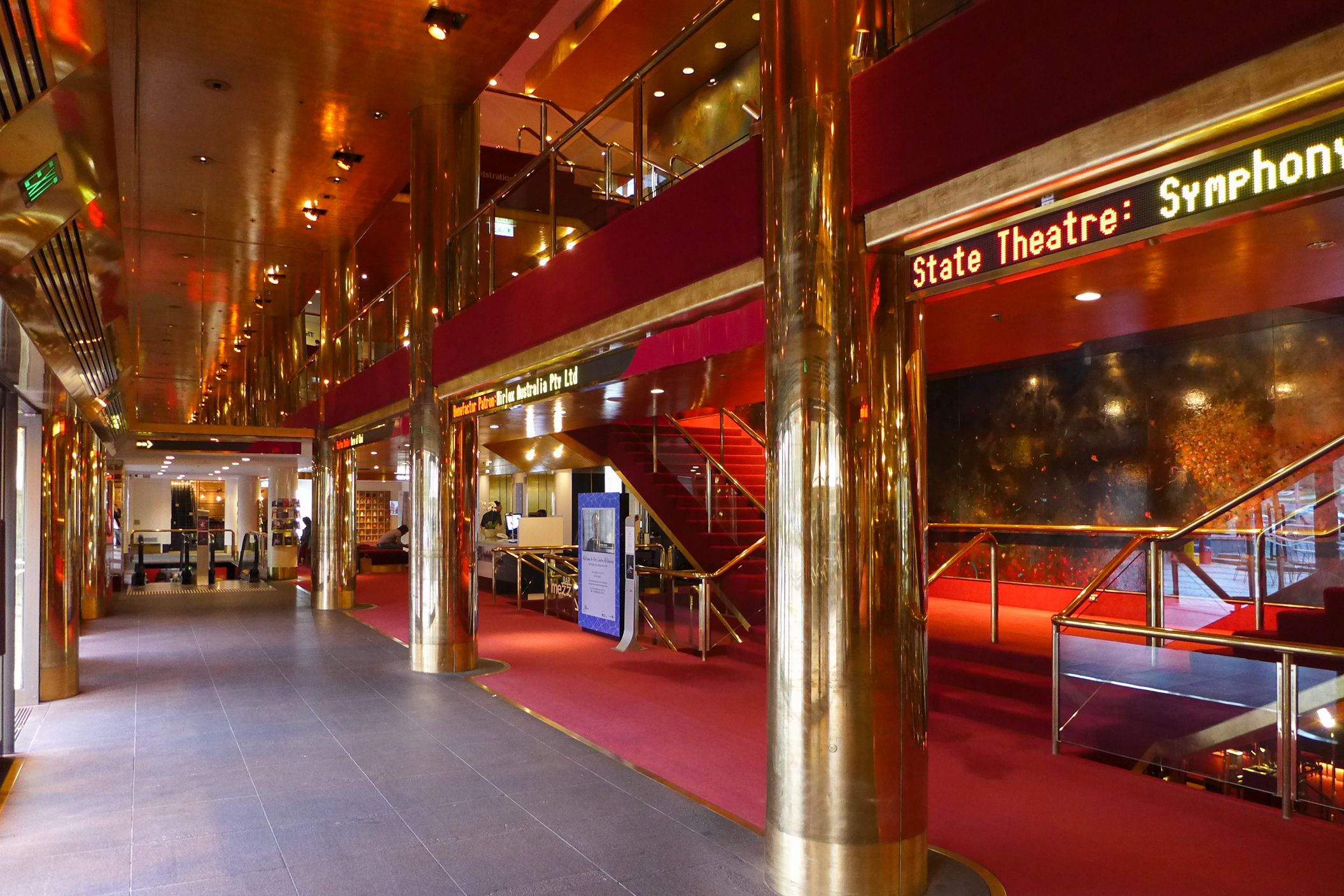
Lobby

== See also ==
- List of theatres in Melbourne
