= Tito Muñoz =

American conductor

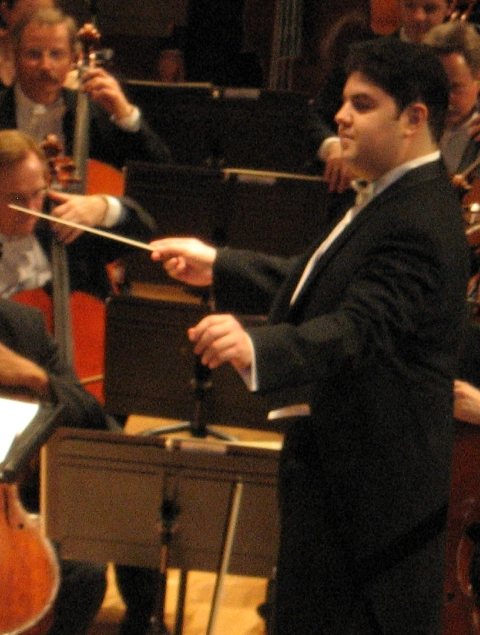
Tito Muñoz

Tito Arturo Muñoz (born July 14, 1983) is an American conductor. He has served as music director of the Phoenix Symphony, Opéra national de Lorraine and Orchestre symphonique et lyrique de Nancy in Nancy, France, and Ensemble LPR in New York City.

== Biography ==
Born in Flushing, Queens, Muñoz first studied music in the New York City Public School System, where he took up violin at the Louis Armstrong Middle School. He attended the Music Advancement Program at the Juilliard School as a violin student of Hisako Resnick and later began composition studies with Amanda Harberg.

Muñoz attended the Fiorello H. LaGuardia High School of Music & Art and Performing Arts where he had his first public performance as a conductor, leading Leonard Bernstein's West Side Story. He performed in many ensembles during his high school years, including the InterSchool Orchestras of New York and the New York Youth Symphony. He also attended the Manhattan School of Music Pre-College Division where he studied violin with Jonathan Strasser and composition with Alexander Yagupsky, and received the Richard Kimball Composition Award. During those summers, Muñoz attended the Kinhaven Music School and Apple Hill Center for Chamber Music.

In 1999, Muñoz attended the French Woods Festival of the Performing Arts and was given the opportunity to conduct several ensembles, as well as a fully staged Broadway musical production. He later returned to the Festival in 2001 and 2003 as faculty, where he taught violin and served as staff conductor.

Muñoz began undergraduate studies at the Aaron Copland School of Music, Queens College, as a violin student of Orion String Quartet member Daniel Phillips. As a conductor, he organized many student performances, conducted the school's orchestras on several occasions, and collaborated with faculty in concerto performances.

In the summers of 2004 to 2006, Muñoz attended the Aspen Music Festival and School as a student in the American Academy of Conducting at Aspen where he studied with David Zinman and Murry Sidlin. He also participated in master classes with many notable conductors including Asher Fisch, George Manahan, David Robertson, Leonard Slatkin and Robert Spano. He won the Festival's 2005 Robert J. Harth Conductor Prize and the 2006 Aspen Conducting Prize and was invited by Zinman to debut with The Cleveland Orchestra at the Blossom Music Center in 2006. He was appointed Assistant Conductor of the festival for the summer of 2007.

After working with Leonard Slatkin, Muñoz was accepted into Slatkin's National Conducting Institute in 2006 and subsequently made his National Symphony Orchestra debut conducting Aaron Copland's Billy the Kid at the Kennedy Center in Washington, D.C.

In May 2006, at age 22, Muñoz was appointed assistant conductor of the Cincinnati Symphony Orchestra. He made his debut with the orchestra in February 2007 conducting a family concert. That same month, he replaced an ill Krzysztof Penderecki to make his Cincinnati Symphony Orchestra subscription debut, with violinist Chee-Yun as soloist. He made his Cincinnati Pops debut in March 2007, performing with the Celtic Tenors. In April 2007, Muñoz was appointed assistant conductor of The Cleveland Orchestra.

Muñoz made his European debut with the Orchestre Lyrique de Région Avignon-Provence in December 2007. He made his operatic debut in January 2009 with the Opéra national de Lorraine in a production of Manuel Caballero's Los Sobrinos del Capitan Grant. He also made his debut with the Opera's orchestra, l'Orchestre symphonique et lyrique de Nancy, that same month. In December 2010, Muñoz was appointed music director of both institutions. In March 2013, Muñoz announced his resignation effective September 2013.

In November 2012, (Le) Poisson Rouge announced the formation of an in-house orchestra named Ensemble LPR and appointed Muñoz as its music director. As of the autumn of 2013, Muñoz was no longer director there.

In February 2014, the Phoenix Symphony appointed Muñoz as its music director. Muñoz concluded his tenure as music director of the Phoenix Symphony at the close of the 2023–2024 season, and subsequently took the title of artistic partner for two seasons. In February 2025, the Cleveland Institute of Music (CIM) announced the appointment of Muñoz as interim principal conductor of the CIM Orchestra, effective in the autumn of 2025, with a contract through the 2026–2027 academic year.

== See also ==
- List of Queens College people

Cultural offices
Preceded by Paolo Olmi	Music Director, Orchestre symphonique et lyrique de Nancy; 2010–2013	Succeeded by Rani Calderon
Preceded by Michael Christie	Music Director, Phoenix Symphony; 2014–2024	Succeeded by Paolo Bortolameolli (designate, effective 2027)
