= Ryan McAdams =

American conductor (born 1982)

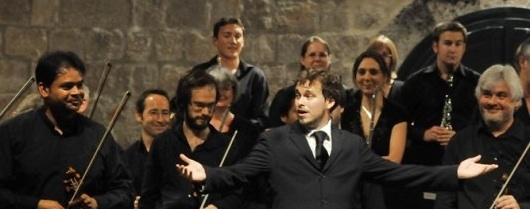
Ryan McAdams with the Academy of St Martin in the Fields in Dubrovnik, Croatia, 2010

Ryan Bell McAdams (born March 16, 1982) is an American conductor.

== Career ==
in 2006, he received a Fulbright Grant for Stockholm, Sweden, where he spent the year serving as Apprentice Conductor to the Royal Stockholm Philharmonic, studying and traveling with then-Chief Conductor Alan Gilbert. In the spring of 2007, he was invited by Lorin Maazel to create the post of Apprentice Conductor for the Chateauville Foundation at the Maazel Estate in Virginia. As a result of the Aspen-Glimmerglass Prize, he served as Assistant Conductor for Glimmerglass Opera's 2007 season.

In 2007, McAdams was named the 15th Music Director of the New York Youth Symphony. He made his Carnegie Hall debut on December 9, 2007, with the New York Youth Symphony and violin soloist William Harvey. His tenure with the New York Youth Symphony garnered significant critical acclaim. During his five seasons as music director, he premiered 15 orchestral works by such leading young composers as Timo Andres, Clint Needham, Christopher Cerrone, Lembit Beecher, Ryan Gallagher, Robert Honstein, Ted Hearne, Elizabeth Kelly, Chris Rogerson, and Eric Guinivan. He also invited a variety of emerging soloists to make their Carnegie Hall debuts with the orchestra, including Kate Lindsey, Anthony McGill, Haochen Zhang, Jennifer Zetlan, Adam Golka, Hahn-Bin, Alex Sopp, the ACME Quartet, Eve Gigliotti, Genghis Barbie, and Jay Campbell.

Since 2007, McAdams has appeared with, among others, the Los Angeles Philharmonic, Israel Philharmonic, Orchestra Sinfonica Nazionale della RAI, Maggio Musicale Fiorentino, The Academy of St Martin in the Fields, New Jersey Symphony, Columbus Symphony, Indianapolis Symphony, CityMusic Cleveland, Vancouver Symphony, Santa Fe Symphony, Glimmerglass Opera, Princeton Symphony, the Saint Paul Chamber Orchestra, the BUTI Tanglewood Orchestra, the Wordless Music Series (NYC), and at Carnegie Hall with the New York Youth Symphony.

McAdams made his European debut with the Maggio Musicale Orchestra in Florence in February, 2010, and was reinvited for subscription concerts in 2012, 2013, and in January 2015 for a concert with the cellist Pablo Ferrández. He returned to Italy in 2011 for concerts with the Orchestra Sinfonica Nazionale della RAI in Turin, and was reinvited to conduct a concert performance of Bizet's "Les pêcheurs de perles" in 2015. He made his American opera debut with the New York City Opera in the spring of 2010, and was named Associate Conductor of the NYCO two months later. He made his Eastern European debut in Dubrovnik, Croatia with the Academy of St Martin in the Fields in September 2010. In October, he conducted the world premiere of Jonathan Dawe's opera "Cracked Orlando" at the Italian Academy in New York, starring Anthony Roth Costanzo. His French debut came in April, 2013 with the Orchestre symphonique et lyrique de Nancy, and was immediately reinvited to conduct a new production of Leonard Bernstein's Candide for Opéra national de Lorraine that fall. He returned to Nancy for a new production of Benjamin Britten's Owen Wingrave in 2014. He made his debut with Opera Theater of St. Louis in the summer of 2013, and returns there for another opera in 2015.

In the summer of 2010, he became the first-ever recipient of the Sir Georg Solti Emerging Conductor Award, a $10,000 prize given by the Solti Foundation in Chicago.

McAdams was the conductor for Elliott Carter's 103rd Birthday Concert at New York's 92nd Street Y with Fred Sherry and Nicholas Phan. Anthony Tommasini, writing in the New York Times, named the concert one of 2011's best classical music events. In 2012, McAdams substituted at the last minute for Rafael Frühbeck de Burgos in subscription concerts with the Israel Philharmonic and guitarist Angel Romero in Tel Aviv, Haifa, and Jerusalem. He returned to the Israel Philharmonic in the fall of 2013, replacing Christoph von Dohnanyi in a series of subscription concerts, and in 2014 replacing Frühbeck de Burgos again in performances of Carmina Burana and concerti with cellist Alisa Weilerstein.

From 2007 to 2012, he served as the 15th Music Director of the New York Youth Symphony. He is currently Principal Conductor of Crash Ensemble, Ireland's foremost contemporary music ensemble.

McAdams is managed exclusively by Keynote Artists Management.

== Awards and Scholarships ==
- Sir Georg Solti Emerging Conductor Award, Solti Foundation, 2010 (inaugural recipient)
- Fulbright Grant, Sweden, 2007
- Aspen-Glimmerglass Prize for Opera and Vocal Conducting (inaugural recipient)
- Bruno Walter Memorial Scholarship, Juilliard School
- Dean's Scholarship, Indiana University
