= View Orchestra =

The View Orchestra formerly know as Valsassina Ensemble Wien (also: Valsassina Ensemble) is an Austrian chamber orchestra. It was founded in Vienna, Austria by the Austrian-Mexican singer León de Castillo in 2012. The orchestra is focused on Austrian repertoire and on oeuvres of the 19th, 20th and 21st century.

== History ==
The View Orchestra was formed by León de Castillo who managed to put together several young colleagues of the University of Music and Performing Arts Vienna to "create a sound which is rather unusual as a steady accompaniment for a singer". His motivation is to establish musical independence. Their debut concert took place at the Diplomatic Academy of Vienna in March 2013. During their first two seasons, the young chamber orchestra performed their early concerts at the Wiener Konzerthaus, Wiener Musikverein, Schlosstheater Schönbrunn, at the Mexican State Opera Palacio de Bellas Artes, at the Sala Nezuahualcóyotl of the National Autonomous University of Mexico and at the New York Carnegie Hall among other renowned concert halls. 2021 the Ensemble made its debut at the Donauinselfest, which is the largest open-air music festival in the world, with around 3 million visitors over 3 days.

== Etymology ==
The new name "View Orchestra" serves as an abbreviation of the original title while reflecting the orchestra's expanded artistic vision. VIEW stands for Valsassina Interdisciplinary Ensemble Wien, emphasizing the ensemble's commitment to crossing the boundaries between classical music, contemporary art, technology, history, politics, and other artistic disciplines. While the name has evolved, the orchestra continues the artistic mission established with the Valsassina Ensemble in 2011.

== Heinrich Schiff ==
The cellist, conductor and former University Professor of the University of Music and Performing Arts Vienna Heinrich Schiff (1951–2016) prepared the Orchestra during the seasons from 2013 to 2016 for their concerts. He welcomed the spirit of the chamber orchestra during rehearsals and empowered the initiative of the Ensemble, where many young artists came deliberately together to perform music.

== Festival orchestra and conductors ==
The View Orchestra is the Festival Orchestra of the Primavera Festival Wien. The main conductor is Bernhard Melbye Voss (Denmark).

2021 former main conductor Marta Gardolinska (Poland) was appointed as music director of the Opéra national de Lorraine and made her debut conducting the Los Angeles Philharmonic at the Hollywood Bowl.

== Women in classical music ==
The View Orchestra's commitment to promoting women in classical music is reflected both in its choice of conductors and in its concert programming. Former main conductor Marta Gardolińska (Poland) was among the orchestra's musical leaders before being appointed music director of the Opéra national de Lorraine in 2021.

Building on this commitment, the View Orchestra launched an annual concert format in summer 2018 dedicated to works by female composers, spanning the Baroque period to contemporary music. The orchestra performs with at least 66% female musicians and includes works by female composers in every concert. Through this approach, the ensemble seeks to highlight women's contributions to classical music and introduce audiences to a broader musical language for a new generation.

The format draws historical inspiration from the Seneca Falls Convention of 1848 and Women's Sunday, organised by the Women's Social and Political Union in June 1908, connecting the history of women's emancipation with their representation in classical music.

== Interdisciplinary projects ==
The View Orchestra focuses on interdisciplinary projects to build bridges between classical music and/or electronic music, alternative pop music, fine / visual arts, history and politics. For example, during their performances at the Diplomatic Academy of Vienna, a theatre play about photographer Erich Lessing took place in different panels in combination with classical music.

Furthermore, the Ensemble cooperated with the contemporary composer Gavin Gamboa (*1985) and the artist collective Teaching Machine (Los Angeles) to initiate a project about Georg Friedrich Händel, Johann Sebastian Bach and Domenico Scarlatti melded with electronic music and visual art. Building on its interdisciplinary approach, the ensemble also explored the intersection of classical music and alternative pop. In 2018, the orchestra performed a crossover project with Austrian indie singer-songwriter Sir Tralala at the ORF RadioKulturhaus, the performance venue of Austria’s national public broadcaster, ORF.

On the occasion of the 280th anniversary of Antonio Vivaldi's death, the Viennese chamber orchestra organized in summer 2021 a interdisciplinary multimedia project referring to the number 4 at the viennese Karlskirche titled IV Viertual Dimensional Reality. The project included projections on one of the biggest churches in Vienna as the performance of The Four Seasons near Antonio Vivaldis grave.

== Baustellen Klassik ==
In the year 2022 the Orchestra created the "Baustellen Klassik" to focus on the objective of construction sites as a vehicle of time travel on the constant journey as an investment for a better future.

For these series the conductor and composer Bernhard Melbye Voss wrote immersive concept music interacting with the sounds of the machines and the construction workers. It was performed next to the construction site for the new metro station at Kirchengasse, Vienna.

== XCES: Techno Meets Classical Music ==
With XCES, the View Orchestra brought classical music and techno together in a new open-air format, combining orchestra, conductor, DJs, and electronic music. Created with DJ and producer Alecid, the project transformed Vienna’s Donaupark into an immersive space where classical and contemporary music met beside the Danube and the Donauturm.
