= Niki Vasilakis =

Australian violinist

Niki Vasilakis is an Australian violinist. Together with the Tasmanian Symphony Orchestra, conducted by Sebastian Lang-Lessing, Vasilakis was nominated for the 2006 ARIA Award for Best Classical Album for the album Mendelssohn, Bruch, Ravel.

Vasilakis featured in the 2007 film 4 playing Summer from Vivaldi's The Four Seasons. She presented the TV series Classical Destinations on SBS. She was named Young South Australian of the Year in 2008 and the state's nominee for Young Australian of the Year.

Vasilakis is of Greek heritage, and her family originates on the island of Ikaria.

== Discography ==
=== Albums ===
List of albums, with selected details
Title	Details
Mendelssohn, Bruch, Ravel (with Tasmanian Symphony Orchestra & Sebastian Lang-Lessing)	Released: 2006; Format: CD; Label: ABC Classics
4 The Soundtrack (with Sayaka Shoji, Cho-Liang Lin & Pekka Kuusisto)	Released: 2007; Format: CD; Label: ABC Classics (442 9963)
Sacred	Released: August 2016; Format: Digital; Label: Niki Vasilakis Violin

== Awards and nominations ==
=== ARIA Music Awards ===
The ARIA Music Awards is an annual awards ceremony that recognises excellence, innovation, and achievement across all genres of Australian music. They commenced in 1987.

Year	Nominee / work	Award	Result	Ref.
2006	Mendelssohn, Bruch, Ravel (with Tasmanian Symphony Orchestra & Sebastian Lang-Lessing)	Best Classical Album	Nominated	
