= 4 (2007 film) =

2007 Australian documentary film

- US film poster
- Directed by: Tim Slade
- Produced by: Joanna Buggy and Tim Slade
- Starring: Sayaka Shoji, Niki Vasilakis, Cho-Liang Lin, Pekka Kuusisto
- Cinematography: Pieter de Vries
- Edited by: Lindi Harrison
- Distributed by: Vast Productions
- Release date: September 2007
- Running time: 88 minutes
- Country: Australia
- Budget: $750,000

4 is a 2007 Australian documentary film directed by Tim Slade exploring Antonio Vivaldi's The Four Seasons through the eyes of four violinists in four countries. Each musician represents a season appropriate to their country: Sayaka Shoji plays Spring in Japan, Niki Vasilakis plays Summer in Australia, Cho-Liang Lin plays Autumn in the United States, and Pekka Kuusisto plays Winter in Finland.

The film was nominated for two Australian Film Institute Awards, an International Documentary Association Award, as well as awards at the Banff World Television Festival. It won several awards, including a Gold Hugo in Chicago. It has sold to more than 20 international broadcasters and screened at more than 25 international film festivals.

It screened on NHK in Japan in December 2010, and on PBS stations in the US in May 2011, and continues to sell via DVD in Australia, New Zealand and the United States, as well as via online sales.

== Box office ==
4 took $118,270 at the box office in Australia. It grossed back its production budget via theatrical release, broadcast, DVD, CD Soundtrack and ancillary sales.
