= Amadéus Leopold =

American classical music artist

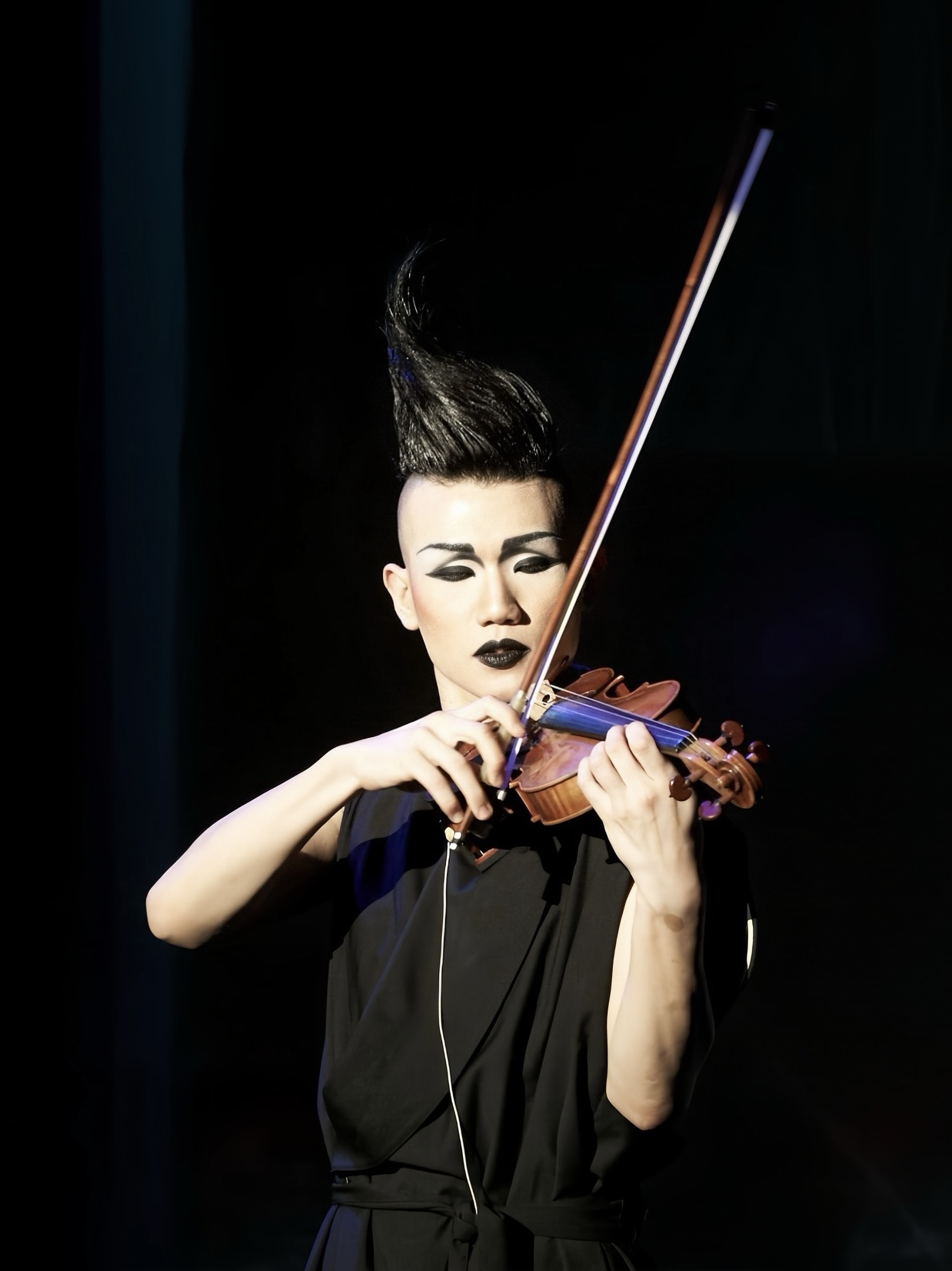
- Leopold performing in 2011
- Born: Hanbin Yoo; 3 August 1987 (age 39); Seoul, South Korea
- Other name: Hahn-Bin (former name)
- Education: The Juilliard School
- Occupation: Musician
- Years active: 1999–2015
- Website: amadeusleopold.com

Amadéus Leopold (born August 3, 1987), formerly known as Hahn-Bin, is a Korean-born American classical music artist. A former child prodigy, he made his U.S. debut at age 12 performing at the Grammy Awards’ tribute to Isaac Stern, and became a protégé of Itzhak Perlman at age 13. Following his departure from Juilliard and his New York debut at Carnegie Hall in 2009, he gained widespread attention in the early 2010s for his iconoclastic reframing of classical performance, through his interdisciplinary project The Renaissance of Classical Music.

== Early life and education ==
Born in Seoul, Leopold grew up in the city's Olympic Village, and began playing the violin at age five through the Suzuki method. Following a series of top prize wins at national music competitions, he became the youngest violinist admitted to the Korea National University of Arts at age 8, studying at its campus within Seoul Arts Center under Galamian-school concert violinists Ik-Hwan Bae and Sung-Ju Lee. At SAC—a flagship multidisciplinary arts complex in Korea—he also received instruction in visual art, ballet, and drama, alongside his musical training. He made his soloist debut at the age of 10, performing with the Seoul Philharmonic at Sejong Center.

At age 11, Leopold was brought to the U.S. for his music career and to study with Robert Lipsett. Within a year of his 1999 arrival in Los Angeles, he made his international debut performing at the 42nd Annual Grammy Awards’s Salute to Classical Music as the featured soloist honoring Isaac Stern, and was subsequently awarded the loan of a Giuseppe Guarneri del Gesu by the Stradivari Society of Chicago. He continued his training with Lipsett at the Colburn School in downtown Los Angeles in the ensuing concert seasons, appearing as a soloist with various orchestras throughout California including the Pacific Symphony under Carl St. Clair and the San Diego Symphony under Murry Sidlin, while attending the Crossroads School in Santa Monica. In a later interview with The New York Times, Leopold said that during his years in Los Angeles, he at times "would tell his mother he was going to Colburn to practice the violin, then sneak off to see performances by Laurie Anderson or the avant-garde playwright Robert Wilson."

Leopold began his studies with Itzhak Perlman at age 13 through The Perlman Music Program in Shelter Island. At 15, he recorded his first conceptual recital project HAZE, which featured works by Arvo Pärt, Leoš Janáček, and Francis Poulenc and was released by Universal Music Korea in 2005. Leopold moved to New York City at age 16 to begin full-time studies with Perlman at The Juilliard School. He attended Professional Children's School in Manhattan and continued his studies with Perlman at Juilliard until 2009.

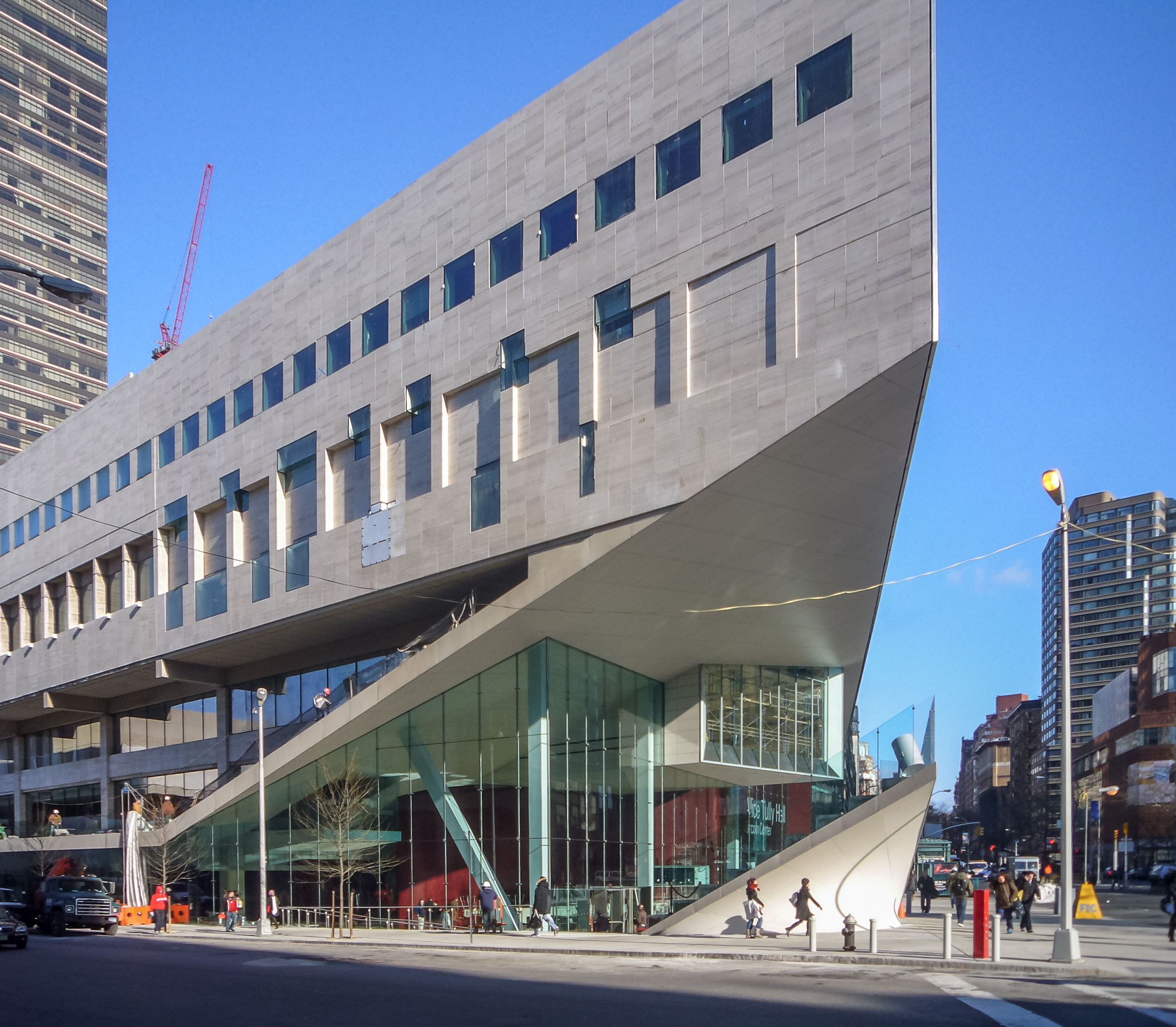
The Juilliard School in New York City, where Leopold studied with Itzhak Perlman

Reflecting later on his time there, Leopold told Interview magazine that Perlman was “an oasis” amid the intense institutional pressures he experienced at the conservatory, and characterized Juilliard's rejection of his burgeoning creativity and individual expression as “apocalyptic.” He also recalled being surrounded by classmates who “didn't understand why he studied the work of the musician Björk and the photographer Nick Knight” alongside that of classical composers, and having to repeatedly challenge the school's administrators over the strict, gender-prescriptive dress codes governing orchestral and other classical performance. He added that, growing up, Perlman had been “the only person in classical music whose eyes I could look into and know that I was okay [...] no matter what I went into the lesson wearing or what I had on my face,” and “the only person who understood that I was a genre of my own.”

Voicing deep frustration with Juilliard's refusal to support a more holistic artistic development—despite the music, dance, and drama divisions it houses within the multidisciplinary Lincoln Center—he recalled that “[m]ost of the things [he] was learning” there were about “boundaries [and] fitting into the box,” adding:

"I really struggled at Juilliard. [...] I would be in arguments with the deans, asking, ‘Why can't I take drama classes? Why can't I take dance classes?’ Because I'm interested in understanding who I am as an artist, not just what's happening with my fingers. And they would say, ‘Well, if you really are that artistic, go to CalArts.’ [Whenever people would ask] ‘How was Juilliard?’ I'd always joke that my favorite part of my years at Juilliard was the shrink they assigned me."

== Career ==
=== 2009: New York debut ===
Following his Paris debut at Auditorium du Louvre in 2008, Leopold won First Prize at the 49th Annual Young Concert Artists International Auditions, and gave his New York debut recital in October 2009 at Carnegie’s Zankel Hall as the recipient of the Peter Marino Concert Prize. Conceived during his final semester at Juilliard, Leopold's program—titled Behemoth and also presented at the Kennedy Center—was noted by critics for departing from the conventional violin recital format in favor of a curated sequence of historical and postwar pairings, juxtaposing John Cage with Chopin, Krzysztof Penderecki with Kreisler, and Witold Lutosławski with Mozart. In his program notes, Leopold described Behemoth as imagining the musical works as “artworks in a gallery”, with each grouping situated in a distinct “room”. For his encore, Leopold performed Alfred Schnittke’s postmodern Silent Night.

=== 2010-2015: The Renaissance of Classical Music ===
==== Overview ====
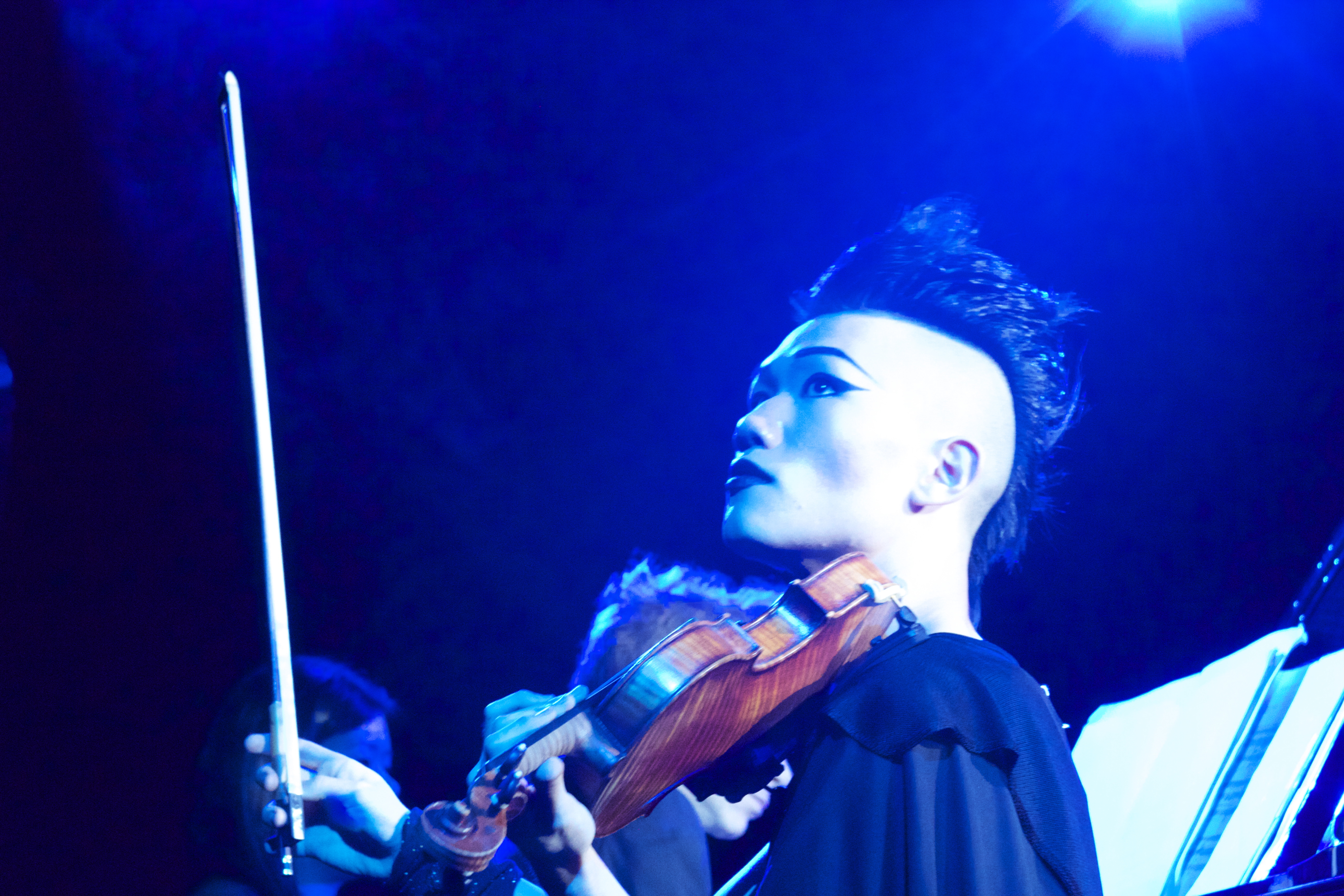
Leopold performing at his Renaissance launch in 2010

Following his uptown debut, Leopold launched The Renaissance of Classical Music in downtown New York at age 22, with a performance at Le Poisson Rouge on May 5, 2010 Described by Leopold as “an all-encompassing project” aimed at serving as “the bridge between classical music, contemporary art and mainstream popular culture,” Renaissance integrated classical repertoire with performance art, visual language, and narrative elements across a range of venues.

Reflecting on his own artistic aims for the project in a later interview with The Seattle Times, Leopold stated:

“What I set out to do after Carnegie was to create my own path — not to belong to any industry [...] Creating my own artistic universe has been my only mission.”

The Renaissance launch also marked a shift in Leopold's public presentation and visual aesthetic. While cultivating a heightened stage persona, he eschewed the formal dress codes enforced within classical music institutions, instead incorporating genderfluid designs by Rick Owens, Gareth Pugh, and Martin Margiela. Describing his mode of self-presentation as the result of an “internal” and “spiritual” process, Leopold cited Cindy Sherman as a key influence on his visual transformations, and noted in interviews that avant-garde fashion functioned as an “incredibly important tool” not only for his Renaissance stage productions, but for articulating “[his] own self rather than what everybody else would rather have [him] be.” Extending this stylized persona beyond the concert stage, his presentation drew comparisons to performance artists such as Klaus Nomi and Leigh Bowery, as well as to theatrical traditions such as kabuki and mime.

Responding to Leopold's interdisciplinary development post-Juilliard, his long-time mentor Itzhak Perlman affirmed the coherence of his artistic evolution, telling The New York Times: “He is an extremely talented violinist who is very, very individual. He combines music with drama and a visual element. It's very personal to him. When an artist feels it that personally, the audience does, too.”

==== Projects and collaborations ====
Leopold's soloist projects under the Renaissance banner included Soliloquy for Andy Warhol, a solo violin performance series at The Museum of Modern Art held in conjunction with the exhibition "Andy Warhol: Motion Pictures"; the world premiere of Still Life by Christopher Cerrone at Carnegie Hall with the New York Youth Symphony and Ryan McAdams; and performances of the Tchaikovsky Violin Concerto with the Seattle Symphony at Benaroya Hall and with the Orchestra of St. Luke’s at Lincoln Center.

Recital projects of Renaissance included The Five Poisons—inspired by Buddhist teachings of Pema Chödrön and Thích Nhất Hạnh—presented at venues including the Rubin Museum of Art in New York, the Konzerthaus in Berlin, the Hammer Museum in Los Angeles, the Isabella Stewart Gardner Museum in Boston, and Strathmore in Maryland; and Till Dawn Sunday, a program drawing on vaudeville’s conception of the classical genre, staged at venues including Joe’s Pub in New York, Royal Albert Hall and Latitude Festival in the U.K., Melbourne Recital Centre in Australia for the Melbourne Festival, Palazzo dei Congressi for the LongLake Festival in Switzerland, Lux Frágil in Portugal, and Royce Hall for UCLA’s Center for the Art of Performance.

During Renaissance, Leopold also collaborated with or created performances for artists outside the classical domain, including Lou Reed at The Stone in New York, Laurie Anderson at the Rubin Museum, Madonna on her album MDNA and the Art for Freedom initiative, and Yoko Ono at Southbank Centre’s Meltdown Festival.

==== Media and cultural reception ====
The Renaissance of Classical Music brought Leopold notable attention across mainstream media and the art and fashion worlds—unusual for a classical musician. He was profiled by The New York Times and the Today Show, and featured in numerous culture and fashion publications, among them Vogue, The New Yorker, i-D, V Magazine, and Artforum.

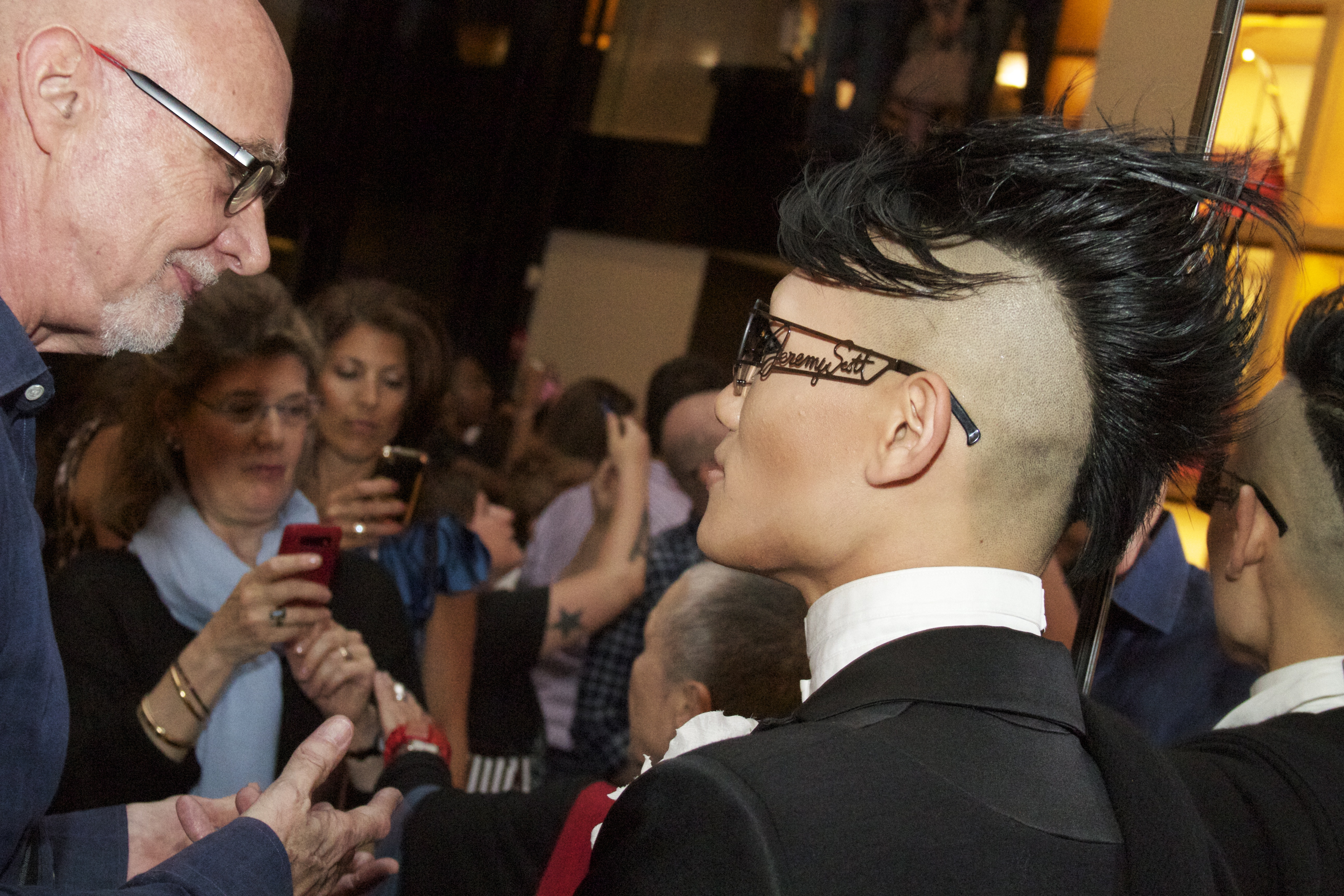
Leopold in 2010 with art historian Douglas Crimp at Louis Vuitton in New York

As cultural critic Madison Moore summarizes in Fabulous: The Rise of the Beautiful Eccentric (Yale University Press, 2018):

“At the time, Leopold [...] pumped around the classical music, fashion, and art worlds in New York City, making a splash with his blend of unquestionable virtuosity, his thrilling sense of performance, his fashion and creative strangeness. He took classical music from Alice Tully Hall to MoMA and from the catwalk to the nightclub.”

Within the contemporary art world, gallerist Barbara Gladstone noted that Leopold's use of “personal theater” against his classical context proved “startling,” while editor David Velasco described his performance of Tzigane staged in the atrium of The Museum of Modern Art—a performance for which, according to Vogue magazine, “Madonna had come specifically to hear the musician, who was wearing a look straight from Rick Owens’s fall runway, play”—as “spellbinding.” Klaus Biesenbach, then MoMA's chief curator at large and an early champion of Leopold, remarked that his “movement, his body, his clothes, his style, his dramaturgy and the music, of course, form one strong, complex, multilayered audio-visual image.”

==== Critical response ====
Many classical music critics responded favorably to Leopold's hybrid approach. Cecelia Porter of The Washington Post, reviewing his “daring” three-part program The Five Poisons in 2011, remarked that his use of “slow-paced, eerie, total-body gesturing [...] strangely intensified the beauties of the music.” Describing him as an “irreverent provocateur” who elicits gasps and “stretches of silence from listeners,” Porter characterized Leopold as an artist who “presents concerts of extremes, both in the range of works he plays and in his personal brand of visual performance art.” John Pitcher of the Omaha World-Herald similarly noted that “once the initial shock of seeing this strange artist onstage wore off [...] one was quickly transported into his artistic universe,” observing that for Leopold, “a classical recital is no dull academic exercise” but “a living, breathing art form that must be played and acted out.” Rich Copley of the Lexington Herald Leader wrote that “throughout [Leopold's] performance, we could see the young man who favored wandering modern art museums when not practicing his violin,” adding:

“But inevitably, because classical music has such a narrowly defined idea of what performances should be, an artist like this gets the question, "what are you compensating for?" [...] Friday night’s performance answered: nothing. [Leopold]’s performance was thrilling and evocative, and his musicianship ultimately carried the evening. If you closed your eyes and listened, it was clear this would have been an exhilarating performance even if the violinist was in a regular haircut and formal-wear on a bare stage. He showed an uncanny ability to take his diverse repertoire and unite it in his instrument, proving that in classical music, theatrics can complement, not compromise virtuosity.”

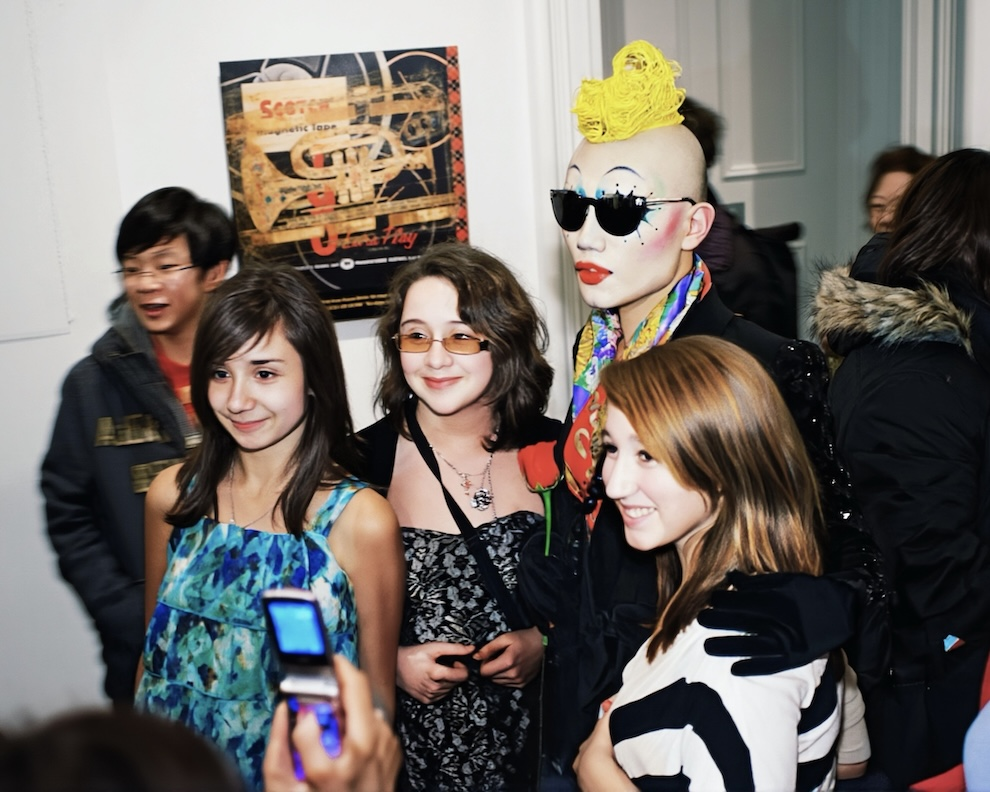
Leopold with young fans following a Till Dawn Sunday show in 2012

Not all critics, however, responded favorably to Leopold's departure from classical conventions. Labeled variously as classical music's “enfant terrible” or “the kooky violinist,” Leopold was, as Jocelyn Bonadio of WQXR noted, often written off by traditionalists who felt “validated dismissing him with a roll of the eyes,” deeming his appearance “too distracting” to be taken seriously as “a legitimate presence” in classical music.

In a 2013 review of Leopold's Till Dawn Sunday—a performance modeled on 19th-century American vaudeville’s democratic vision of the classical genre—Mark Swed, the classical music critic of the Los Angeles Times since 1996, bristled at Leopold's decision to eschew traditional long-form works in favor of shorter, more accessible works. While conceding Leopold's “command of his instrument, his musicality and his innate theatricality,” Swed questioned the artistic legitimacy of Leopold's approach, likening the program's costume changes across its four acts to “a teenager preparing for a hot date,” and dismissing other elements as “pop culture clichés.” Misspelling Leopold's former name as “Ha Bin” and abandoning the concessions made in his review, Swed, writing in an unrelated article a few months later, extrapolated: “Leopold represents the worst of look-at-me Liberace banality. He lacks charm and has already, in his early 20s, gone too far, letting ostentatious fashion gaudily color his musicianship. With Liberace, you never really knew who he was [...] Boastful Leopold wants you to know everything.” Marty Duffy of The Sydney Morning Herald, describing Sunday as more "rock concert than recital," characterized the “autobiographical performance piece” similarly, calling it a “somewhat self-obsessed journey” that was “often heavy-handed, with the musical integrity sometimes the loser to the spectacle.” Others, including NPR’s Anastasia Tsioulcas, voiced similar reservations, suggesting that his individualistic visual aesthetic was incompatible with classical repertoire, or critiquing the persona-driven media narrative he developed during Renaissance as excessive and self-indulgent.

Such critiques reflected broader resistance to Leopold within segments of the classical music community. His gender-nonconforming aesthetics and theatrical persona, coupled with an unusual degree of media visibility, provoked recurring commentary in classical music forums and on social media, frequently targeting his appearance and presumed sexual orientation, as well as his unconventional presentations of canonical repertoire. Asked to respond to such reactions across the wider classical community in one interview, Leopold remarked:

“It's been interesting... to see certain members from the classical music sphere, who haven't seen a single performance by me, get all riled up about my approach — or take my alter-egos at face value.”

Offering a more pointed assessment in other interviews, Leopold stated that “in the classical music world, what they want the soloist or any musician to be is a mannequin wear[ing] these great works of art by Beethoven and Brahms, just there to show people how it hangs on us.” In another, he added: “There is such a thing as the classical music industry, and I think it's useful to point out that I am not a part of that industry [...] It's not that I don't want to be a part of it; it's just that I never have been.”

For his part, Itzhak Perlman, asked to comment on his “iconoclastic” protégé in one interview, "dismissed any idea" that Leopold's approach was "gimmickry," stating: “It's not like he is following a trend in classical music right now [...] He is setting the trend.” In another interview, Perlman added: “He's a terrific fiddle player. He has a particular vision of how he wants to present classical music, and I'm very happy with that. You have to be your own person. If you do something because the audience expects certain things, I don't think it's as good as if you totally believe in it and try to convince an audience to see it your way.”

=== Tchaikovsky Violin Concerto performance at Lincoln Center (2012) ===
On May 9, 2012—the day President Obama became the first sitting U.S. president to endorse same-sex marriage—Leopold staged a Stonewall riots-inspired performance of Tchaikovsky’s Violin Concerto at Lincoln Center, later named by The New York Times as one of the year's highlights.

For the performance, he entered the Alice Tully Hall stage “draped in an American flag [...] along with a can of Budweiser,” with the number “1969”—the year of the riots—painted on his leg, before unveiling a stage costume consisting of a sleeveless Levi's denim vest, a white tank bearing a large pink triangle across the chest, “skintight denim shorts” with bandana and pocket handkerchief details referencing the 1970s handkerchief code, and “chunky black leather” Timberland work boots. As he performed the concerto's first movement, Leopold “proceeded to walk around and through the orchestra,” exposing the back of his denim vest, which was emblazoned with the slur “FAGGOT FREAK” in large pink stencils—a reappropriation of a phrase that had frequently appeared in online attacks against him.

The performance, described by Zachary Woolfe of The New York Times as “one of [Leopold]’s dazzling, genuinely provocative takes on classical music as performance art” and as a "cri du coeur" drawing “a connection between Tchaikovsky's aching emotionalism and [the composer]’s agonizing battle with his homosexuality,” featured a notable scene in the concerto's second movement that extended this connection to broader histories of anti-queer violence. In this scene, as Leopold knelt on the floor facing the audience “during a particularly poignant passage”—beside a chair wrapped in a “crumpled black plastic” body bag—“blood began pouring out of [his] mouth” onto his white tank top, running down the center of its large pink triangle.

The third movement saw Leopold “pacing the stage, making dramatic swipes in the air with his bow”, with “jerky, aggressive movements [that] heightened the tension.” In the finale of his performance, Leopold took off his stenciled denim vest, “unfurled a rainbow flag from the back of his [white tank] and tied [it] to his wrists” before climbing to the top of a staircase at the edge of the concert stage, concluding the performance “in triumphal mode” with the flag outstretched like wings behind him.

According to HuffPost, the performance was met with “a screaming, standing ovation” by the audience at Lincoln Center, while The New York Times wrote that it “evoked something of what Liszt’s deliriously sweaty, grandiosely hypersexualized concerts must have felt like.” Writer Derek Blasberg, in another account of the audience's response to the performance, reported that although Leopold had “received congratulations from Lou Reed,” who was in attendance, and “solicited a standing ovation from most,” some responded with either “complete silence” or boos, writing:

“The whole production was remarkable, and completely unforgettable. To say that it was also controversial is an understatement. There were definitely some people unimpressed with his modern take on classical music; the chubby, old man behind me in an ill-fitted tuxedo actually booed at some points. But what cannot be ignored is that the hall was packed, and there were young people, perhaps for the first time in recent history. Whether or not you like the theatrics, you can't ignore his talent and the fact that he is putting new eyes on an art form that most young eyes have no desire looking at.

== Artistry and identity ==
=== Artistic approach ===
Leopold's output during Renaissance was often termed “avant-pop classical” in the press and described as inseparable from his life story, which W Magazine characterized as one of a “misfit on the run.”

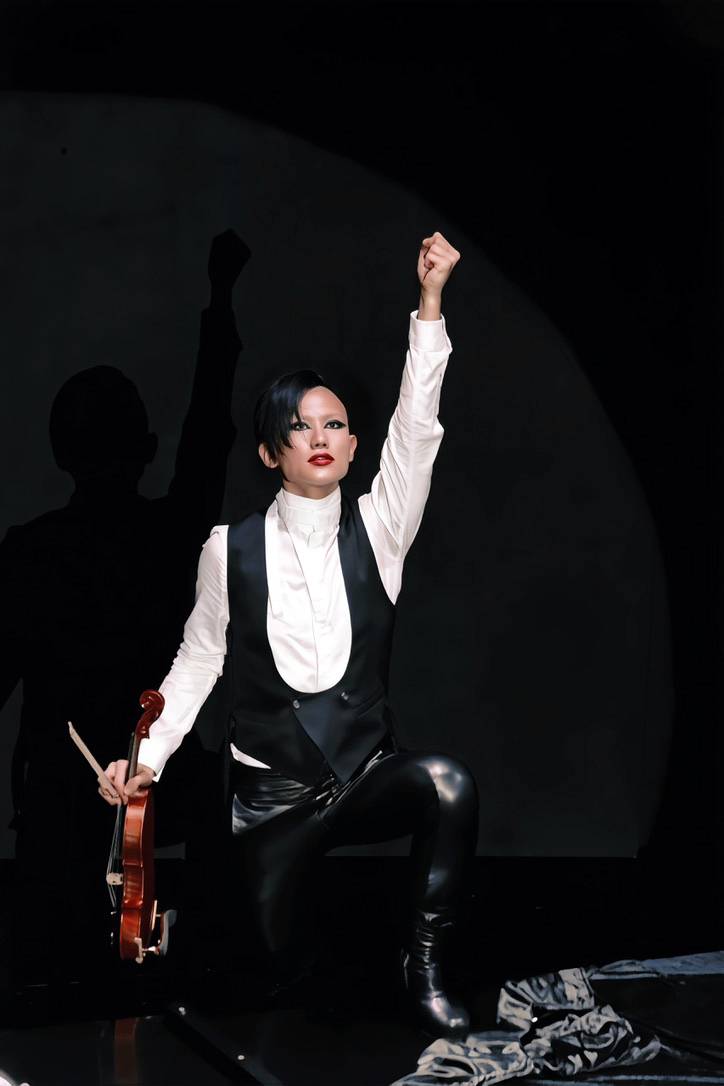
Leopold in a 2011 performance

Describing his creative process, Leopold told Dazed magazine:

“I'm searching for the most accurate and precise way for me to communicate with the world, and for someone who feels as misunderstood as I do, there are no boundaries when it comes to artistic expression.”

Reflecting on his artistic path, he stated that he'd been “born with a burning passion for performance,” and that, for him, to perform meant “creating a new dimension, a new world.” As he “grew older and began to confront the harsh boundaries of our society,” Leopold continued, “this way of life, this language of mine, began to extend beyond the music and the violin.”

Though he at times described himself during Renaissance as a performance artist or “a pop artist who happens to sing through the violin,” Leopold rejected the idea that these forms superseded or existed independently of his classical foundation. Often describing classical music as his “native language” since the age of five, he remarked that the violin “was part of [his] body before [he] knew it” and became his primary means of communication after emigrating from Korea as a child prodigy, a role that deepened following his move to the United States.

Recalling a formative stretch following his 1999 arrival in Los Angeles—when he had begun to lose his Korean but had not yet gained fluency in English due to the demands of his music career—he stated in a 2015 interview:

“There was a period in my life where I realized the only way I could communicate with people and be understood was through my fingers [...] The language of classical music became who I am, and I’ve devoted my whole life to sharing it.”

=== Artistic influences ===
Alongside Robert Wilson, Cindy Sherman, Björk, and Laurie Anderson, Leopold's influences included classical artists Vladimir Horowitz and Maria Callas, chanson artists Jacques Brel and Édith Piaf, interdisciplinary artists Meredith Monk and Pauline Oliveros, and art rock artists Suicide and Jeff Buckley.

=== Name change ===
In 2012, after becoming eligible for U.S. citizenship, and amid Renaissance performances that drew on American motifs and explored themes of identity and transformation, Leopold formally adopted the name of his stage persona. The transition was staged in Till Dawn Sunday, whose first half centered on death and the second on rebirth. At its core was a symbolic funeral for Hahn-Bin, accompanied by program notes styled as a mock New York Times obituary. During its scripted monologue, he stated:

"The only way I could move on to my future was by murdering my past [...] I know some of you loved Hahn-Bin... But I couldn't. Because sometimes, the wounds of our past just won't heal."

The name is a double homage, symbolically bringing together the estranged W. A. Mozart and his father, Leopold Mozart, while also honoring Leopold Auer, an influential early-20th-century violin pedagogue noted for urging that a teacher must “never kill the individuality” of a pupil and that each violinist should “develop freely in their own way as regards inspiration and ideals.”

=== Identity ===
While Leopold did not adopt fixed identity labels—telling both The New York Times and Los Angeles Times that he never felt connected to categories such as “Asian or American, boy or girl, gay or straight”—his work during the Renaissance era often drew on queer cultural memory. He was named to the Out100 list in 2011, and his gender nonconformity, expressed through a self-authoring approach as a concert violinist, remains a rare departure from established norms in the classical concert tradition.

== Withdrawal from public life ==
In 2015, following his U.S. naturalization, Leopold withdrew from the stage and public life, removing his online content and social media presence. His last known public appearance was a performance titled Edward Violinhands, held in January 2015 at the Wortham Theater Center in Houston, Texas.

== Discography ==
=== Albums ===
Year	Album	Label
2005	HAZE	Universal Music Korea

=== Collaborations ===
Year	Song	Album	Artist	Label
2012	"Year of Living Dangerously"	Magic Hour	Scissor Sisters	Polydor
2012	"Beautiful Killer"	MDNA	Madonna	Interscope
