= Genghis Barbie =

American horn quartet

- Origin: New York City, NY, U.S.
- Genres: Contemporary classical
- Occupation: Chamber ensemble
- Years active: 2010–present
- Labels: Sublyme Records; Genghis Vinyl
- Members: Freedom Barbie – Alana Vegter; Velvet Barbie – Danielle Kuhlmann; Alpine Barbie – Laura Weiner; Attila the Horn – Rachel Drehmann
- Website: www.genghisbarbie.com

Genghis Barbie is an American horn quartet founded in New York City. They perform works in the classical music genre as well as arrangements of folk tunes and pop music.

== History ==
The quartet was formed in 2010 by founding members Danielle Kuhlmann (Velvet Barbie), Jacquelyn Adams (Jungle Barbie), Rachel Drehmann (Attila the Horn), and Alana Vegter Gartrell (Freedom Barbie). The group's name was inspired by a family friend who at a young age drew a comic strip called "Genghis Barbie."

Members, as well as guest artists on their studio albums, take on a "Barbie name" as an alter ego and as part of the group's irrevent persona. Past members also include Leelanee Sterrett (Cosmic Barbie), Kelly Csillam Misko (Electric Barbie), and Wei Ping Chou (Sunshine Barbie).

The group has worked pedagogically as guest artists and lecturers with universities on women's studies panels and exploring entrepreneurship in music.

Genghis Barbie has performed extensively, predominately in the U.S., at annual symposiums of the International Horn Society and Carnegie Hall. In television, the group appeared in season 1 of The Chris Gethard Show and season 7 of America's Got Talent. Their recording of A-ha's "Take On Me" was used in season 3 of the HBO show The Leftovers.

== Works written for the group ==
- On the Hunt – Elizabeth A. Kelly (2012) – premiered with the New York Youth Symphony with conductor Ryan McAdams
- The River – Kyrie McIntosh (2012) – recorded on the studio album Songs for Noa
- Song for a Nightingale – Rubin Kodheli (2013) – recorded on the studio album Songs for Noa
- Guns N' Rosenkavalier (rock-recital) – arr. John Glover, Andrew Wilkowske; lyrics by Kelley Rourke (2014)
- Common Backyard Dinosaurs – Brad Balliet (2019) – recorded on the studio album 2 Legit

== Discography ==
- Genghis Barbie – Genghis Vinyl Records (2011)
- Home for the Holidays – Sublyme Records (2011)
- Songs for Noa – Sublyme Records (2013)
- Amp it Up! – Genghis Vinyl Records (2013)
- 2 Legit – Genghis Vinyl Records (2019)
