= InterSchool Orchestras of New York =

The InterSchool Orchestras of New York (ISO) was founded in 1972 by Annabelle F. Prager as a response to the limited opportunities for school children in both public and private schools to play in an orchestra. It has since grown to include three beginning orchestras, an intermediate band, two intermediate orchestras, a symphonic band, and an advanced orchestra. An essential part of its mission is that no child ever be turned away because of lack of financial resources; 50% of its students receive some financial aid, including all members of the top orchestra. Its music director for much of its history was Jonathan Strasser.

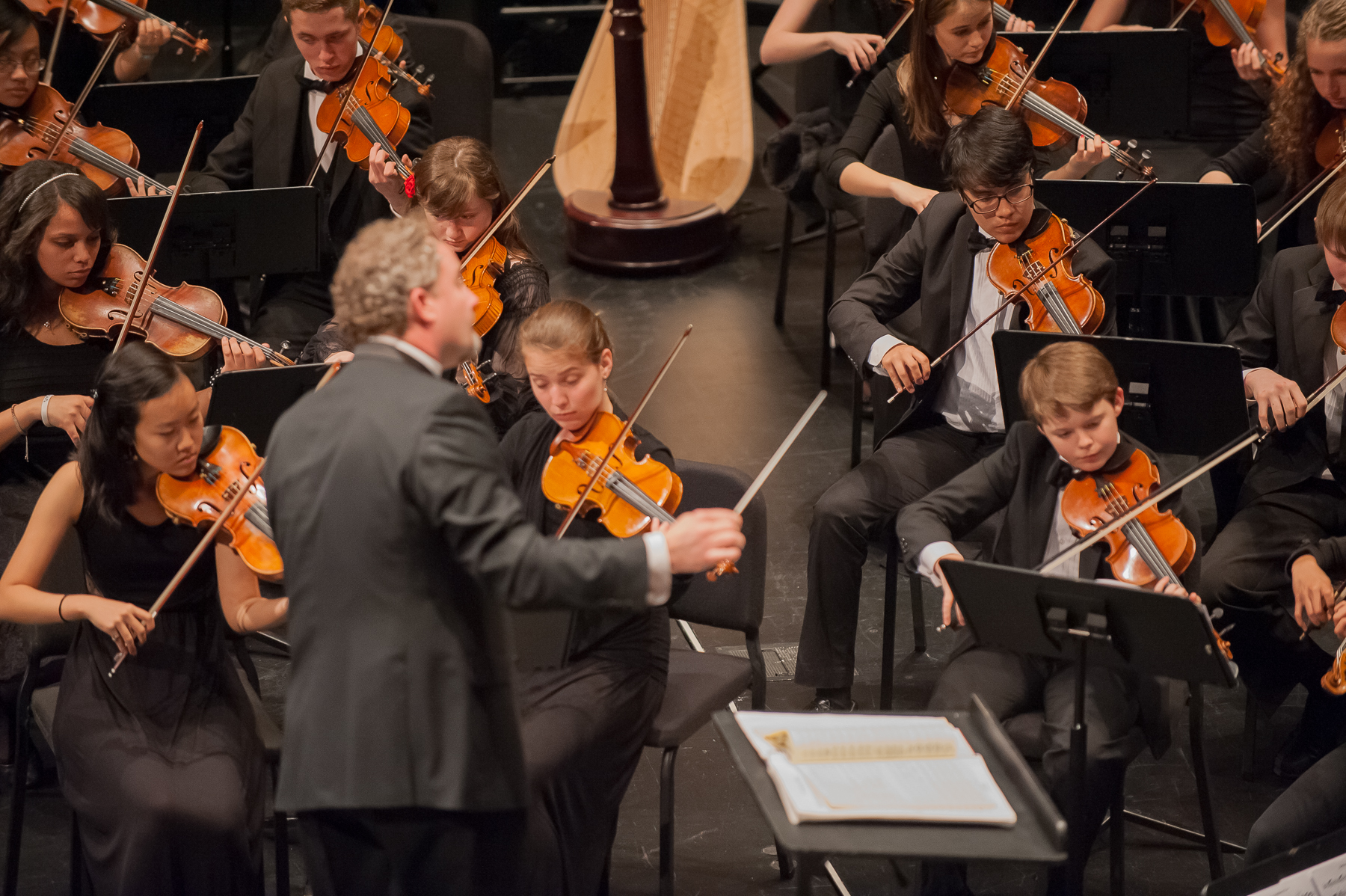
ISO Symphony performs at Jazz at Lincoln Center, May 28, 2014

In October 2020, ISO announced its orchestras will join the programs of the Third Street Music School.

ISO was recognized by the League of American Orchestras with the 2004 Bank of America Award for excellence in orchestra education.

== Ensembles ==
The Carnegie Hill Orchestra, under the direction of Steven Rochen, provides training for beginning/intermediate-level musicians, who perform original orchestral music and arrangements.

The concert orchestra is made up of more advanced players, conducted by Page Silverman.

The symphonic band was founded by ISO alumnus and former music director Brian Worsdale in 1993. It is the only private youth wind symphony in New York City. It performs advanced-level and intermediate-advanced-level music. The ensemble is led by Paul Corn.

The ISO Symphony, conducted by Barry Stern, is the ensemble of the most advanced players in the organization. The ISO Symphony mainly performs works of orchestral repertoire.

== Performance ==
ISO produces up to 20 concerts a year. All ensembles regularly perform Mainstage Concerts at prominent venues such as Symphony Space, Carnegie Hall, and Alice Tully Hall. They also perform a free Community Concert Series; venues include parks, festivals, places of worship, local arts centers, and care facilities. The ISO Symphony has toured internationally, most recently to Scotland in 2014 to take part in the Aberdeen International Youth Festival.

== Other programs ==
Older ISO students serve as mentors to younger musicians as part of the Student Mentor Program. Students playing less common instruments (viola, contrabass, French horn, oboe, and bassoon) can receive reduced-cost lessons through the Endangered Instrument Program.

== See also ==
- New York Youth Symphony
