= Orchestra of the National Opera of Lorraine =

The Orchestra of the National Opera of Lorraine (known until 2019 as the Orchestre symphonique et lyrique de Nancy) is a French symphony orchestra based in the city of Nancy in the province of Lorraine, France. The orchestra consists of 66 musicians giving approximately 20 performances a year, mainly in the Opéra national de Lorraine and in the Salle Poirel, as well as other halls in Lorraine. The orchestra also accompanies all productions of the Opéra national de Lorraine.

== History ==
The precursor ensemble was established in 1884 as a municipal orchestra, with guidance from Edouard Brunel, the director of the Conservatoire de Nancy, and gave its first concert on 27 June 1884. In 1889, the composer Joseph-Guy Ropartz, a successor to Brunel as director of the Conservatoire, and the director of the opera, Albert Carré, set up a season of symphonic concerts taking place in the Salle Poirel, built specifically for this purpose. In 1979, the orchestra became independent in 1979 and took its current name.

The most recent music director of the orchestra was Rani Calderon, from 2015 to 2018. Calderon had previously served as principal guest conductor of the orchestra in the 2014–2015 season. In October 2020, Marta Gardolińska first guest-conducted the orchestra, in the French premiere of Der Traumgörge of Alexander von Zemlinsky, as presented by the Opéra national de Lorraine. On the basis of this appearance, in January 2021, the orchestra announced the appointment of Gardolińska as its next music director, effective with the 2021–2022 season, with an initial contract of three seasons. Gardolińska is the first female conductor ever to be named to this post.

== Music directors ==
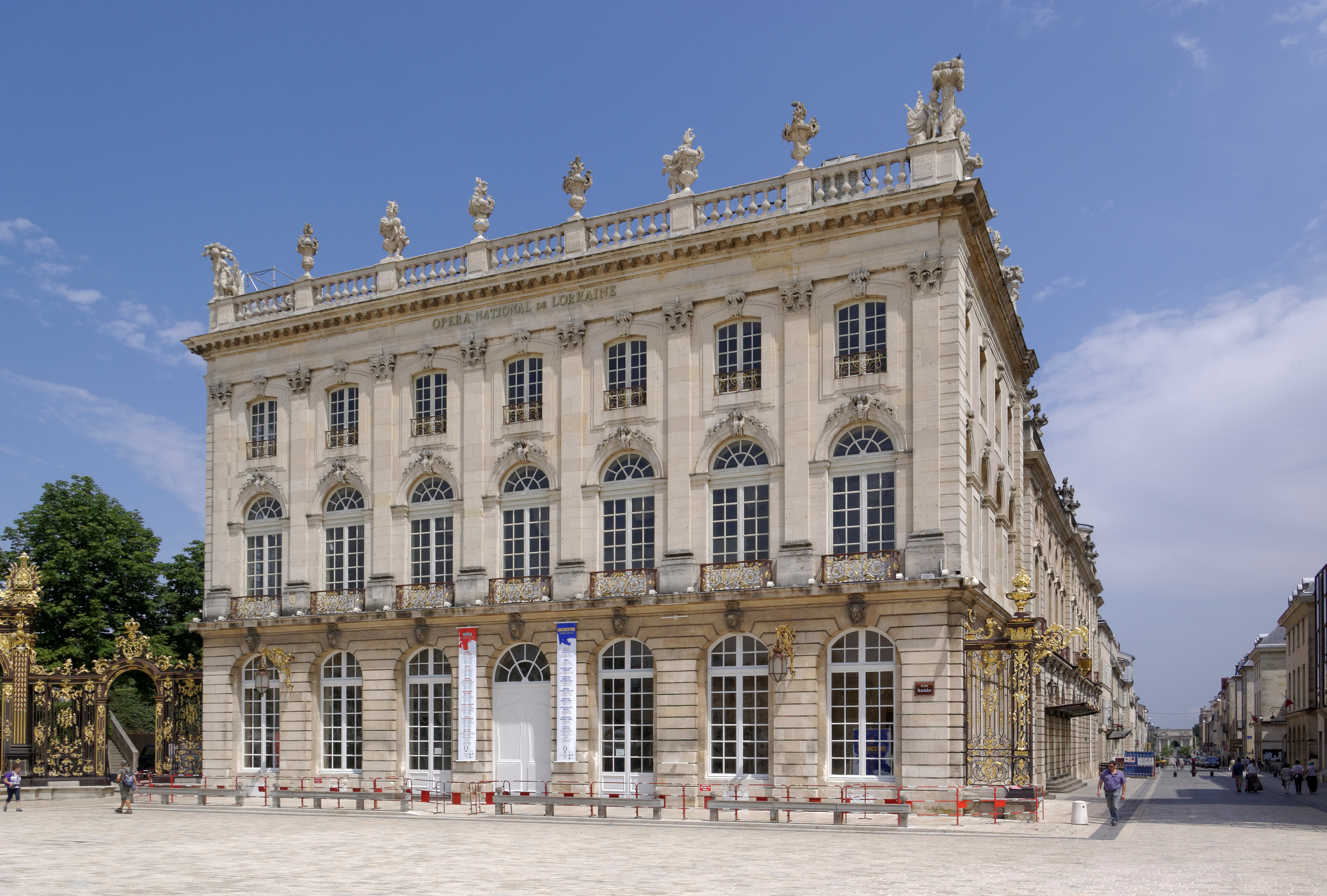
National Opera of Lorraine.

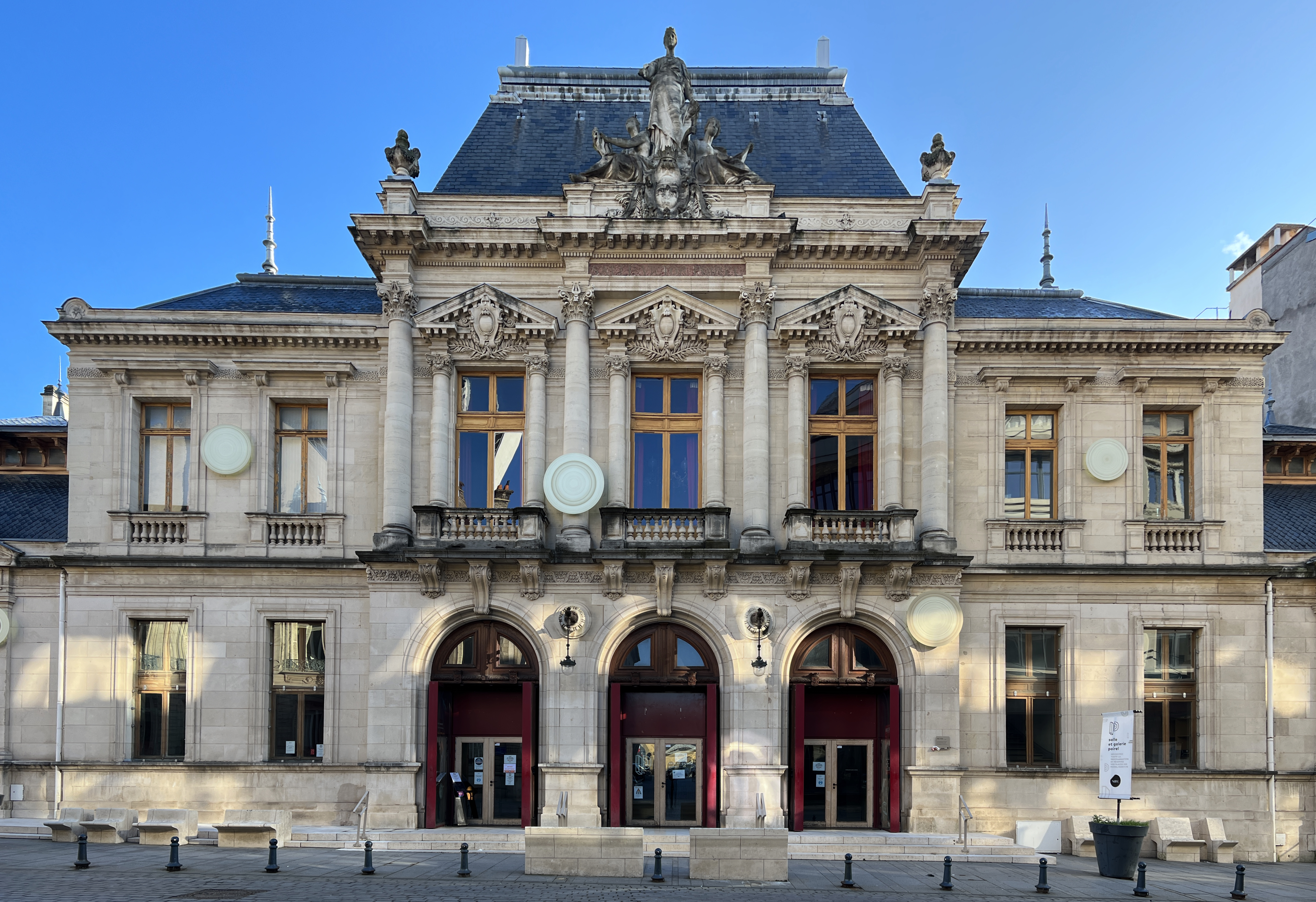
Poirel concert hall, Nancy, France.

- Noël Lancien (1971–1979)
- Jérôme Kaltenbach (1979–1998)
- Sebastian Lang-Lessing (1999–2006)
- Paolo Olmi (2006–2010)
- Tito Muñoz (2011–2013)
- Rani Calderon (2015–2018)
- Marta Gardolińska (2021–present)

== Discography ==
- Airs d'opéra et d'opéra comique français, 1988, dir. Kenneth Montgomery, ed. Le Chant du monde.
- Marius Constant : 4 Concertos, cor, orgue de barbarie, saxophone, trombone, 1990, dir. Jérôme Kaltenbach, ed. Erato.
- Henri Duparc : Mélodies, Lenore, Aux étoiles, Danse lente, 1993, dir. Jérôme Kaltenbach, éedd. Accord.
- Joseph-Guy Ropartz, Psaume 136, Dimanche, Nocturne, Les vêpres sonnent, Le miracle de saint Nicolas, 1993, dir. Michel Piquemal, ed. Naxos.
- Manuel Rosenthal : Orchestral works, Les petits métiers, Mélodies, Musique de table, 1996, dir. Jérôme Kaltenbach, ed. Marco Polo.
- Ernest Chausson : Symphony in B flat major, Poème, Viviane, 1998, dir. Jérôme Kaltenbach, ed. Naxos.
- Théodore Gouvy : Electre opus 85, 1998, dir. Pierre Cao, ed. K617.
- Erik Satie : Parade, Trois Gymnopédies, Mercure, Relâche, 1999, dir. Jérôme Kaltenbach, ed. Naxos.
- Joseph-Guy Ropartz : Symphonies n° 1 & 4, 2005, dir. Sébastien Lang-Lessing, ed. Timpani.
- Joseph-Guy Ropartz : Symphonies n° 2 & 5, 2006, dir. Sébastien Lang-Lessing, ed. Timpani.
- Cristian Carrara : Magnificat, Ondanomala, Suite per bicicletta e orchestra, Vivaldi in memoriam, 2015, dir. Carlo Guaitoli, ed. Brilliant Classics.
