= Blank Canvas (film) =

- Directed by: Tim Slade
- Starring: Rafael Bonachela
- Release date: 2009
- Running time: 52 minutes
- Country: Australia
- Language: English

Blank Canvas is a 2009 documentary film about the creation of 'We Unfold', a contemporary dance work. The film was directed by Tim Slade and features Spanish-born choreographer Rafael Bonachela and the Sydney Dance Company.

The film was made as Rafael Bonachela began his tenure at the helm of the company, after the departure of long time Artistic Director Graeme Murphy and the sudden death of Tanja Liedtke, who was initially meant to be Murphy's successor. The film makes note of this transitional period, but structures itself around the creation of the 'We Unfold', as well as around the movements of the musical composition on which it is based, the Symphony No.1 'Oceans' for cello and orchestra by Italian composer Ezio Bosso.

Bonachela's personality is significant emphasised throughout the film. with specific nods to his journey from a small Spanish town, through studies in Spain and London, as well as working with Rambert Dance Company, the singer Kylie Minogue and finally as the leader of his own company.

The film was positively received on its first broadcasts in late 2009 and has screened in Europe, the United Kingdom and Australia as well as being commercially available in the United States.
