= Opéra national de Lorraine =

Coordinates: 48°41′35″N 6°10′57″E

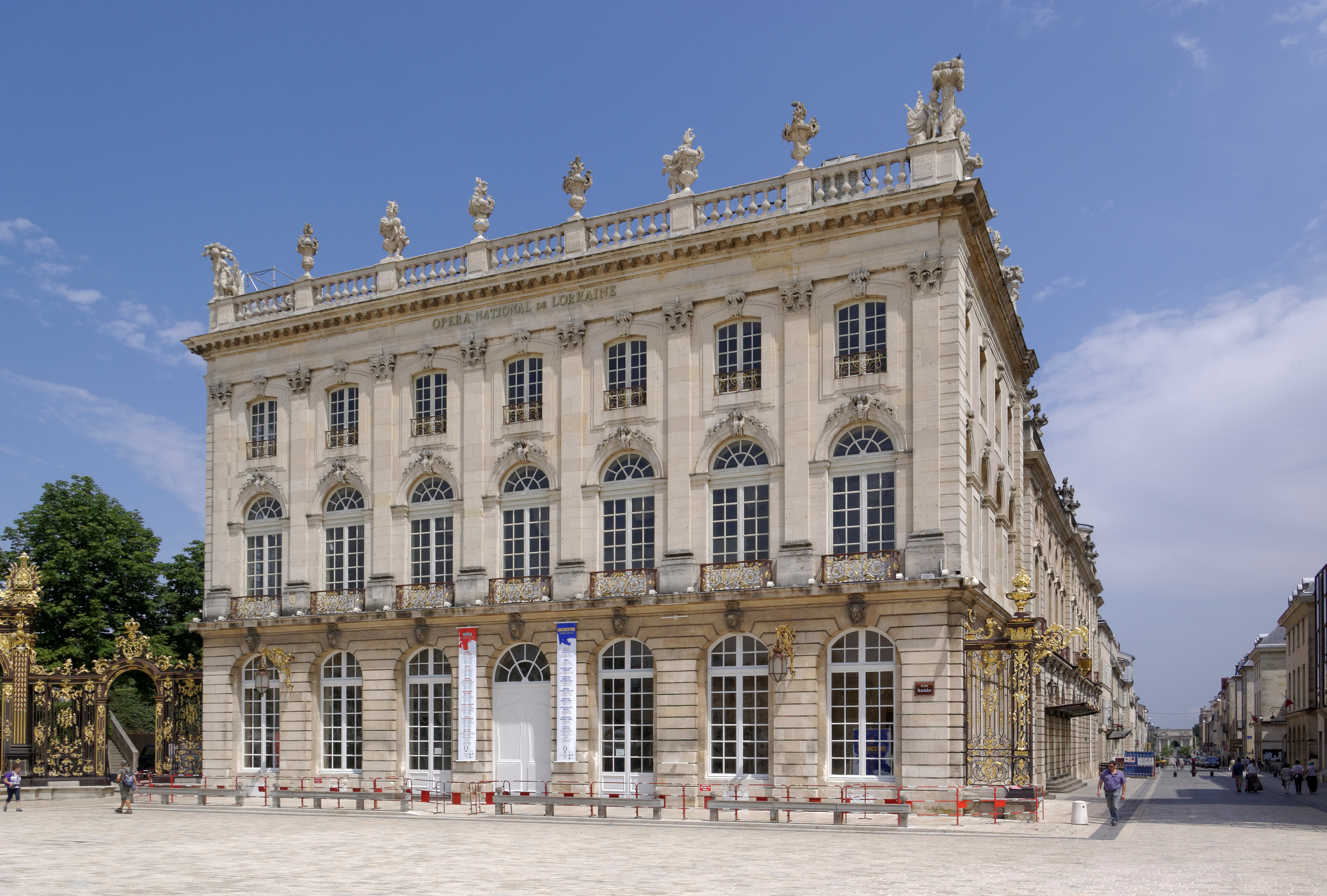
Opéra national de Lorraine, Nancy

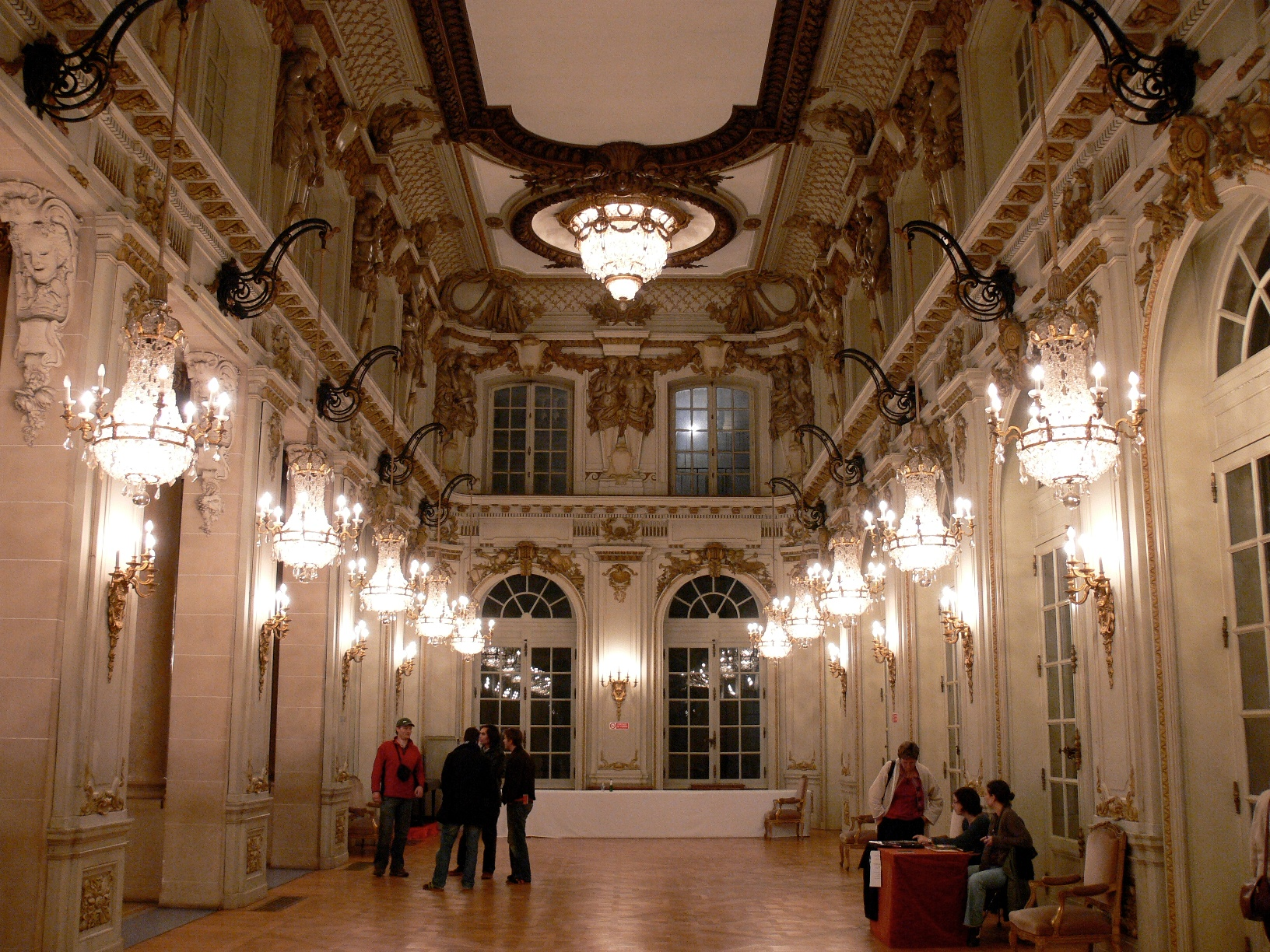
Foyer of the opera house

The Opéra national de Lorraine is a French opera company and opera house, located in the city of Nancy, France in the province of Lorraine, France. Formerly named the Opéra de Nancy et de Lorraine, the company received the status of national opera in 2006. Opéra national de Lorraine is a member of the association Réunion des Opéras de France (ROF), of the European Network For Opera (RESEO) and of Opera Europa. All productions are accompanied by the Orchestra of the National Opera of Lorraine.

== History ==
The company's original theatre was constructed during the reign of the king of Poland and duke of Lorraine, Stanislas Leszczyński in 1758. This theatre, located behind the Museum of Fine Arts, was destroyed by fire in October 1906. A new opera house was constructed in its present location on the Place Stanislas by Joseph Hornecker, a member of the School of Nancy. Hornecker designed the replacement opera house in the classical style combined with characteristics of "art nouveau". The new opera house was inaugurated in 1919. It underwent restoration in 1994. The auditorium has a capacity of 1050 seats.

On 1 January 2006, the Ministry of Culture and Communication awarded the Nancy opera house the title Opéra national ('National Opera'). As a result, the Opera of Nancy and Lorraine became the fifth regional National Opera.

Past music directors of the company have included Noël Lancien (1971–1979), Jérôme Kaltenbach (1979–1998), Sebastian Lang-Lessing (1999–2006), Paolo Olmi (2006–2010), Tito Muñoz (2011–2013), and Rani Calderon (2015–2018). In October 2020, Marta Gardolińska first guest-conducted with the company, in the French premiere of Der Traumgörge of Alexander von Zemlinsky. On the basis of this appearance, in January 2021, the company announced the appointment of Gardolińska as its next music director, effective with the 2021–2022 season, with an initial contract of three seasons. Gardolińska is the first female conductor ever named to this post. In April 2024, the company announced the extension of Gardolińska's contract as music director through the 2025–2026 season. Gardolińska concluded her tenure with the company at the close of the 2025–2026 season.

Matthieu Dussouillez has been the general director and artistic director of the company since September 2019.

== Music directors (partial list) ==
- Noël Lancien (1971–1979)
- Jérôme Kaltenbach (1979–1998)
- Sebastian Lang-Lessing (1999–2006)
- Paolo Olmi (2006–2010)
- Tito Muñoz (2011–2013)
- Rani Calderon (2015–2018)
- Marta Gardolińska (2021–2026)

== See also ==
- List of opera houses
