= Jonathan Strasser =

American musician, educator, teacher, and conductor

- Born: June 3, 1946; New York City, United States
- Died: March 8, 2017 (aged 70); New York, United States
- Resting place: Sharon Gardens, Valhalla, New York
- Education: High School of Music & Art; Manhattan School of Music
- Occupation(s): Musician, Educator, Conductor
- Years active: 1970s–2017
- Employer(s): Manhattan School of Music; LaGuardia High School
- Known for: Founder of InterSchool Orchestras of New York; Role in the film Fame (1980)

Jonathan Strasser (June 3, 1946 – March 8, 2017) was an American professional musician, educator, teacher, and conductor.

== Biography ==
Strasser was born and raised in New York City. He attended the High School of Music & Art. He then attended the Manhattan School of Music for violin studies.

He was a faculty member for over 30 years at Music & Art and his high school's successor, LaGuardia H.S. of Performing Arts. To address the needs of students in New York City without a music program at their school, he founded the InterSchool Orchestras of New York. He was also on faculty for the Manhattan School of Music pre-college division, for which he would remain on faculty for over 30 years as teacher and conductor of the MSM Precollege Philharmonic.

Strasser held the role of actor as “the conductor” of the High School of Performing Arts orchestra during its performance in the 1980 film Fame.

In the press, he was profiled in the New York Times.

== Death ==
Strasser died from cancer at the age of 70. He is buried at Sharon Gardens in Valhalla, New York. His legacy includes countless students who went on either to be musicians and music teachers themselves or were influenced and mentored to be dedicated to their chosen path in life, with music always being important.
