= Eric Guinivan =

Eric Guinivan (born 1984) is a composer, percussionist, founding member of the Los Angeles Percussion Quartet, and was principal timpanist of the YMF Debut Orchestra. He has received commissions from Chamber Music America, the Fromm Foundation, New York Youth Symphony, the International Horn Society, Lake Union Civic Orchestra, the Firebird Ensemble, Staunton Music Festival, the Lotte Lehmann Foundation, and the Society of Composers, Inc., among others. His output includes works for orchestra, wind ensemble, percussion, brass band, chamber orchestra, film, and a wide variety of chamber ensembles and solo instruments. He currently serves as Associate Professor of Composition at James Madison University, and was previously a graduate teaching fellow at the University of Southern California.

== Early life and education ==
Guinivan was born and raised in Wilmington, Delaware, and began studying percussion at age 10. He earned his Bachelor of Music (2006) in composition and percussion performance from the Indiana University Jacobs School of Music, and his Master of Music (2008) and Doctor of Musical Arts (2011) in composition from the USC's Thornton School Of Music.

== Performing career ==
Eric was a founding member of Los Angeles Percussion Quartet and has performed with orchestras and chamber ensembles across the country. During his time with LAPQ, Eric presented concerts throughout California and recorded his work Ritual Dances at Skywalker Sound on the Sono Luminus label. Guinivan's first professional performance as a soloist was on his "Concerto for Percussion and Orchestra", a piece he composed and premiered with the Downey Symphony and the University of Southern California Symphony Orchestra. He premiered his new work "Meditation and Awakening" with the New York Youth Symphony at Carnegie Hall in May 2011.

== Recognition ==
Guinivan's compositions have garnered multiple awards, including the 2007, 2010, and 2011 BMI Student Composer Awards, the 2008, 2011, and 2014 ASCAP Morton Gould Young Composer Awards, and second place in the 2009 Lotte Lehmann Foundation Art Song Competition. In 2013, he was nominated for a Grammy Award for Best Small Ensemble Performance for his work on Rupa-Khandha with the Los Angeles Percussion Quartet.
