= Tim Slade (director) =

- Occupations: Film and Television Director
- Website: http://www.timsladefilms.com/

Tim Slade is an Australian born film and television director, who works in both documentary and drama. His films have screened theatrically, at film festivals and on broadcast television in the UK, Europe, Asia, North and South America, Australia and New Zealand.

His feature documentary film '4', which explores the nature of the seasons and how they shape who we are, won a Gold HUGO at the Hugo Television Awards in Chicago, and was nominated for two Australian Film Institute Awards, an International Documentary Association award, and at the Banff World Television Festival. It received strong reviews upon its theatrical release, and screened in Australian cinemas for 16 weeks.

Blank Canvas, made for broadcaster Foxtel, dynamically follows Sydney Dance Company and its Artistic Director Rafael Bonachela as they create the dance work 'We Unfold', based on a musical work by the Italian composer Ezio Bosso.

The Destruction of Memory, released in mid 2016, explores the urgent issue of cultural destruction, and has screened widely internationally and been broadcast in many parts of the world.

His other completed films include Every Other Weekend, a short drama which has screened widely at film festivals in Europe, the USA, the UK, Australia and South America as well as on MTV networks in the US, the documentary Musical Renegades and the short form I Was Robert Mitchum, which merges documentary and fiction.
