= Madison moore =

American artist-scholar

madison moore
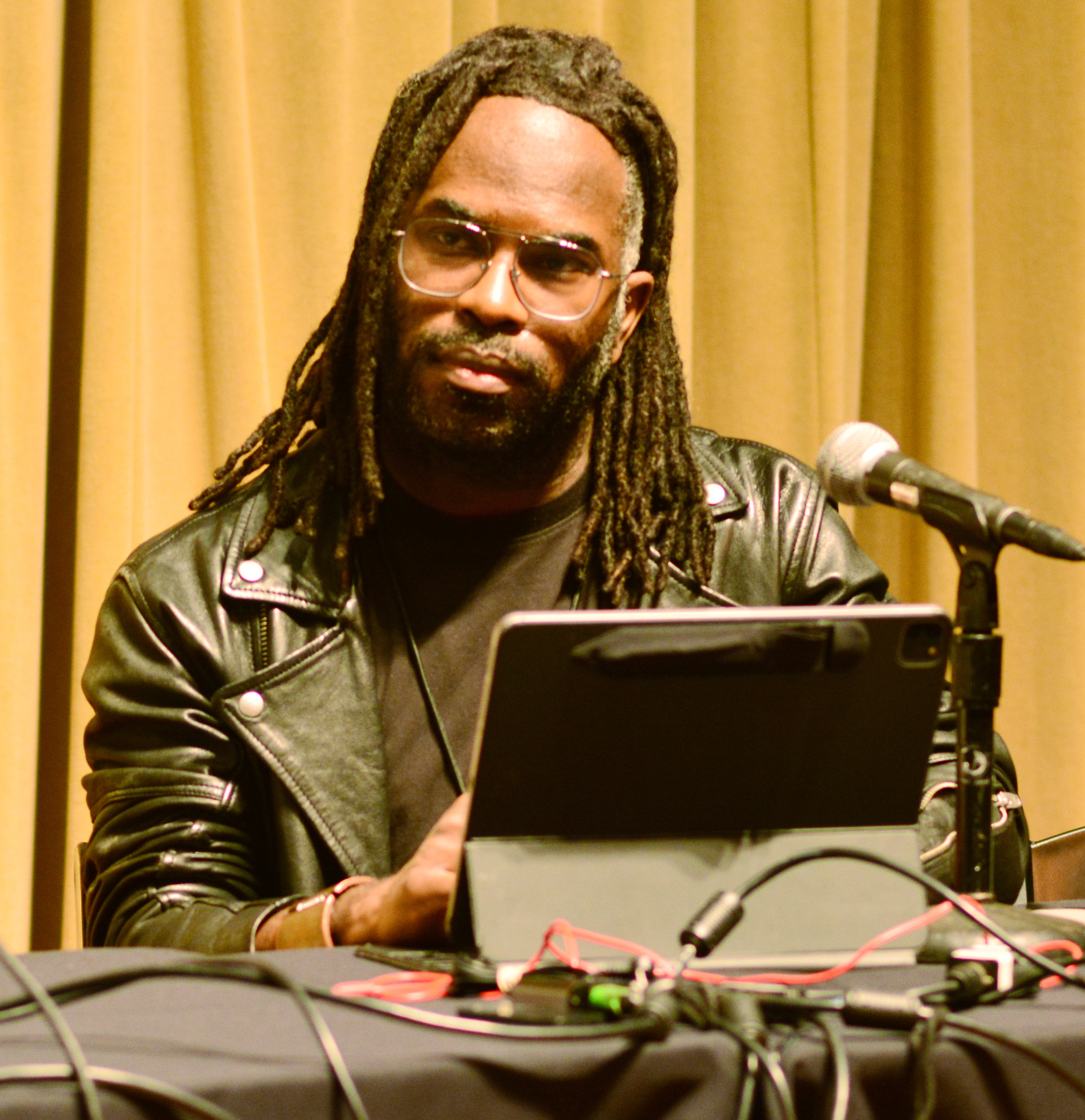
- madison moore in 2025
- Born: 1981/1982 (age 43–44); Ferguson, Missouri, US
- Education: Yale University
- Occupations: Artist, scholar, DJ
- Website: madisonmooreonline.com

madison moore (Note: moore does not capitalize his first or last names.) (born 1981/1982) is an African-American artist, scholar, and DJ. He (Note: moore goes by "any pronouns". This article uses he/him for consistency.) is an assistant professor at Brown University, and the author of the 2018 book Fabulous: The Rise of the Beautiful Eccentric. His work focuses on the culture of queer and transgender people of color.

== Early life and education ==
moore was born in Ferguson, Missouri. He was raised by his grandmother in a "solidly working class" family. As a child, he studied to become a classical violinist, but did not continue with the instrument after being rejected by a conservatory.

As an undergraduate at the University of Michigan, moore majored in French literature, and wrote a thesis on French gay pornography. He attended graduate school at Yale University, earning a Ph.D. in American studies.

== Career ==
moore serves as assistant professor of modern culture and media at Brown University. Previously, he worked as a postdoctoral research associate in race, queer, and media studies at King's College London, as assistant professor of gender, sexuality, and women's studies at Virginia Commonwealth University, and as assistant professor of critical studies in the Roski School of Art and Design at the University of Southern California.

In 2018, moore published his first book: Fabulous: The Rise of the Beautiful Eccentric, which includes interviews with queer entertainers, fashion designers, and others about their culture and aesthetics. Interviewees include performance artists Alok Vaid-Menon, Pepper Pepper, and Victoria Sin, costume designer Patricia Field, vogue dancer Lasseindra Ninja, and violinist Amadéus Leopold.

In 2019, moore interviewed actor and singer Billy Porter for a program at The Met on camp and the impact of ballroom culture, held in conjunction with the Camp: Notes on Fashion exhibition.

In 2022, moore served in the first "nightlife-in-residency" at The Kitchen, where he curated programming on queer nightlife and club culture.

In June 2025, moore was credited for contributing to the creation of the Google Doodle on hyperpop, in celebration of Pride Month.

== Personal life ==
moore describes himself as "a Black, queer, non-binary person". He goes by "any pronouns". He credits Prince for embodying the flamboyant, androgynous aesthetic that helped moore accept his own queer identity.
