= Noël Lancien =

Noël Lancien (24 December 1934 – 23 July 1999) was a French composer, conductor and music educator, first Grand Prix de Rome in 1958.

== Life ==
Born in Paris, spotted very early for his musical gifts, Lancien entered the Maîtrise de la Radio when it was created in 1945 and began composing. He joined the Conservatoire de Paris in rue de Madrid in 1949, and he obtained the First Prix de Rome in 1958 for his cantata Une mort de Don Quichotte. He studied musical analysis with Olivier Messiaen and musical composition with Tony Aubin and Darius Milhaud, and won a second conducting prize in 1959.

He was director of the Conservatoire de Toulouse from 1964 to 1970 and of the Conservatoire de Nancy from 1970 to 1997, and conductor of the Orchestre symphonique et lyrique de Nancy during the same period. He directs half of the programs, and brings to Nancy soloists such as Maurice André, Pierre Barbizet, Yuri Boukoff, Roger Bourdin, Jacqueline Brumaire, Annie Challan, Xavier Darasse, Christian Ferras, Jean-Jacques Kantorow, Alexandre Lagoya, Frédéric Lodéon, Mady Mesplé, Nathan Milstein, Daniel Wayenberg and Pierre Sancan.

Lancien died in Mauvages (Meuse).

== Works ==
- Deux sonnets de Shakespeare for strings, flute, oboe, clarinet, bassoon and mezzo-soprano, 1954
- Le bal des champs de M. Desbordes-Valmor for voice and piano, 1955
- Trois Ballades de François Villon for four mixed voices a capella, 1955
- Chanson de Clément Marot for Choir, 1956
- Suite bretonne for flute, oboe, harp, string quartet, 1956
- Couples fervents et doux de A. de Noailles for voice and piano, 1956
- Le mariage forcé, after Molière, 1956
- Petite Valse for piano, 1956
- Toccata for piano, 1956
- 24 harmonisations de chansons populaires for Choir, 1956–74
- 22e Ode de Ronsard for voice and piano, 1957
- La Fée Urgèle, Cantata, 1957
- Vantardises d'un marin breton ivre de Max Jacob for voice and piano, 1958
- Sonate for piano and cello, 1958
- Chantefleurs et Chantefables de Robert Desnos, 1958
- Le cimetière des fous de Paul Eluard for bass and orchestra, 1958
- Une mort de Don Quichotte, cantata, 1958
- Petite valse for string quartet, 1959
- Thème et variations for cello and piano, 1960
- Quatre prières à la Vierge for soprano and orchestra, 1961
- Concerto for trumpet and string quartet, 1961
- Vers à mettre en chant de Boileau for baritone and orchestra, 1968
- Première Position for piano, 1968
- Vocalises for trumpet and piano, 1968
- Fuguette for piano, 1984
- Toute Petite Suite for guitar, 1986
- Ballade des Dames de Nancy d'après François Villon for four mixed voices, 1993
- Montes Gelboë, in memoriam Robert Planel for saxophone and piano, 1994
