= Manhattan School =

- U.S. National Register of Historic Places
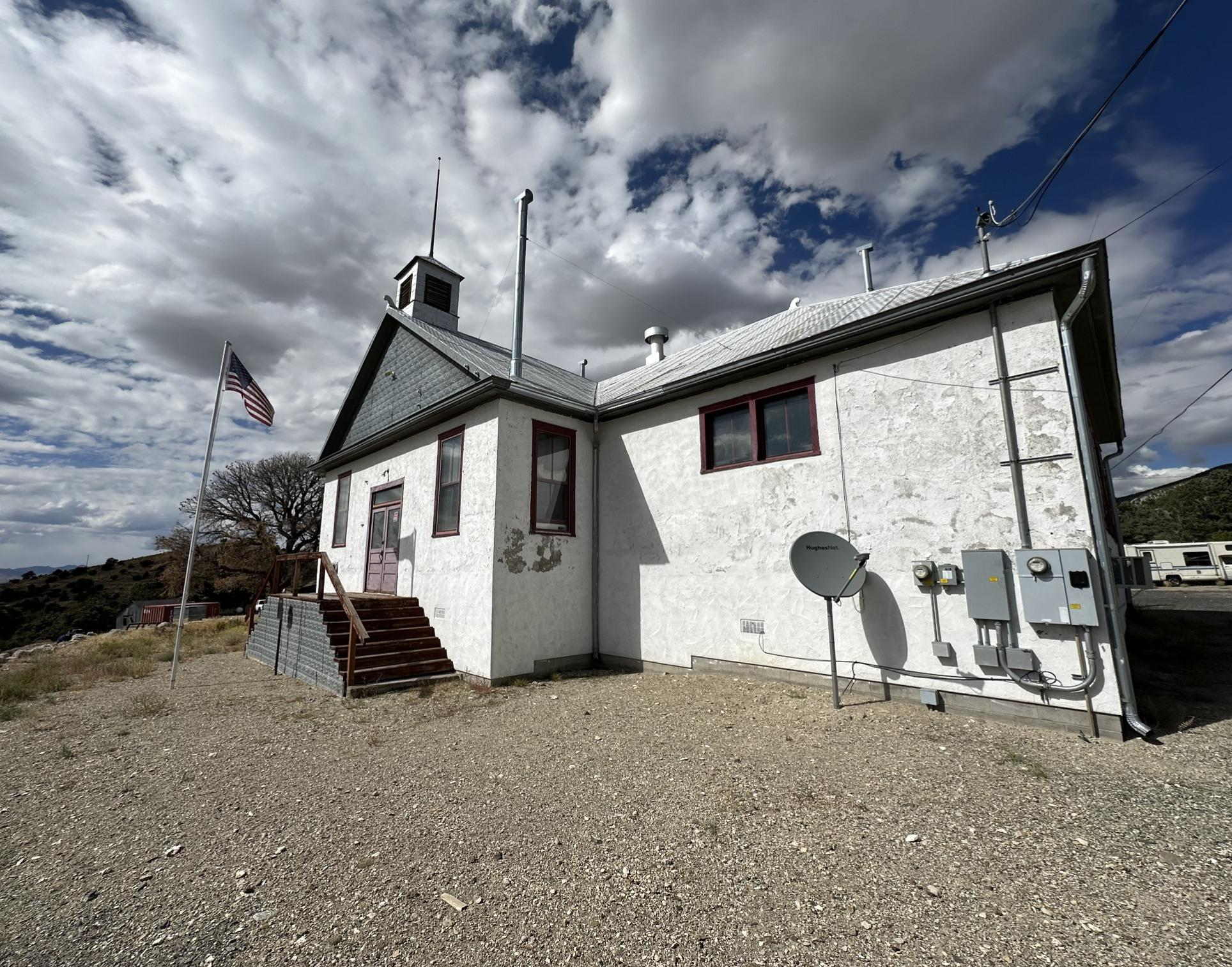
- Manhattan School building in 2024

- Location within Nevada Location within the United States
- Location: Gold St. bet. Mineral St. and Dexter Ave., Manhattan, Nevada
- Coordinates: 38°32′23″N 117°04′30″W
- Area: less than one acre
- Built: 1913
- Built by: Angus McDonald
- NRHP reference No.: 06000108
- Added to NRHP: March 8, 2006

The Manhattan School is a historic schoolhouse located on Gold Street in Manhattan, Nevada. Built in 1913, the school was the third in Manhattan. The first school had opened in 1906, shortly after a gold rush in the community, and the second opened in 1908; however, by 1911 the local school district had 65 students and had outgrown its original buildings. Manhattan's voters unanimously passed a bond proposal for the new school the following year. Area contractor Angus McDonald built the school the year after. Upon its completion, a benefit party was held at the school to provide money for its furniture and a piano.

The single-story building has a vernacular design with a central entrance foyer, a hipped roof, a bell tower atop the foyer, and a flagstaff on the site of the roof. When the building was constructed, both the interior and exterior were covered by patterned metal plates. The plates were decorated based on their location; for instance, the plates on the outer walls were designed to resemble ashlar stone, and the plates on the roof resembled shingles. While most of the exterior plates have since been covered, the interior plates and the plates on the foyer's gable are still in place.

The Works Progress Administration added an outhouse added outside of the school in the 1930s. While the WPA built 1,100 outhouses in Nevada, the outhouse is one of only three they built in southern Nevada. The outhouse is considered a contributing feature to the school's historic nature.

Manhattan's population dropped as its gold industry faded in the 1940s, and by 1955 the school closed, as it only had three students. Due to an increase in gold prices in the 1970s, though, Manhattan began to grow again. The school reopened as a library in the following decade. The Smoky Valley Library District acquired the library from the county in 2002 and subsequently renovated it to include a museum and community center.

The school was added to the National Register of Historic Places on April 30, 2004.
