= León de Castillo =

Austrian opera singer

Christian Kostal León de Castillo (born 7 September 1983) is an Austrian-Mexican tenor, conceptual artist, musicologist and artistic director.

== Biography and career ==
León de Castillo was born in Mérida, Yucatán, Mexico, the son of a Mexican mother and an Austrian father. Several generations of his father's family were involved in music in different ways such as: singing in the Vienna Boys' Choir and other choirs, as conductors (Kapellmeister), and organists.

His career began at the age of five when he sang in a boys' choir in Mérida, Mexico. Later, in Vienna, he passed the audition at the Mozart Boys' Choir of Vienna and participated in various tours around Europe, and to South America and Asia. He also performed in various operas with the Vienna State Opera and Vienna Volksoper, and performed at numerous festivals including the Vienna Festival.

After graduating high school with honors, he decided to study communication studies, political science, and Romance philology (German: Lang de Publizistik, Politikwissenschaft und Romanistik). In 2007, he passed the entry exam and began studying singing at the University of Music and Performing Arts, Vienna, with the headmaster of the institute for singers, Karlheinz Hanser and the vice director Gabriele Lechner. While there, he also studied opera with the musical supervisor of the Bayreuth Festival, Christoph Ulrich Meier.

Only one year after beginning his singing studies, he debuted as a soloist at the Theater an der Wien in Vienna, sharing the stage with Plácido Domingo and Patricia Petitbon in the Zarzuela Luisa Fernanda. He also sang other operas at the Theater an der Wien. In 2009, he performed the role of Wachtmeister in the opera Prinz von Homburg with Christian Gerhaher. He appeared in 2010 with Plácido Domingo and Cristina Gallardo-Domâs as the Thug in the opera Il postino by Mexican composer Daniel Catán.

In 2011, he performed the role of Melibeo in Joseph Haydns La fedeltà premiata and participated in Christian Gerhaher's master class at the SWR Festival in Germany. He also participated in Anssi Hirvonen's master class for Finnish Lied Repertoire at the Sibelius Academy in Helsinki, Finland. He performed at the opening of the Life Ball charity event in Vienna, performing as Mars, the Roman god of war, in the adapted version of G. F. Händel's opera Rinaldo at the Rathausplatz in Vienna. He sang as part of the Gustav Mahler Festival and Exil.

At the end of 2011, he returned to his Mexican hometown of Mérida. He dedicated 2012 as the year of Mayan culture in Mexico and sang a solo concert at the Theatre Jose Peón Contreras, his first concert of the year, on January 5, inaugurating the celebration festival of the 470th anniversary of Mérida.

In 2012, he had his debut at the Palacio de Bellas Artes (State Opera in Mexico) beside the mezzo-soprano, Encarnación Vazquez, a project with the Austrian Culture Forum in Mexico. He also sang in recitals at the Concert Hall of the National Museum of Art, Teatro Armando Manzanero. He performed the role of Alfred in the operetta Die Fledermaus at the Teatro Peón Contreras with the Synfonic Orchestra of Yucatán. His debut at the Brahms-Saal of the Wiener Musikverein was singing with the soprano, Ildikó Raimondi.

In 2013, he sang at the Palacio de Bellas Artes in Mexico City, and had his debut at the Konzerthaus, Vienna, singing a solo concert. Additionally, he had concerts in Detroit, Paris, and Marseille.

== Valsassina Ensemble Vienna ==
Together with the chamber orchestra, Valsassina Ensemble Vienna, he has performed at the Konzerthaus and Musikverein in Vienna, and in other Austrian concert halls. In 2014, they toured together in Mexico and the United States, giving concerts at the Palacio de Bellas Artes, Chapultepec Castle, and the Sala Nezahualcoyotl in Mexico City, and at Carnegie Hall in New York; all in the first fourteen months of their concert activity.

== Chamber music and Lied ==
De Castillo's repertoire includes not only opera, but also German Lied, mélodies and other forms of art songs in seven different languages. They include song cycles such as: Franz Schuberts Schwanengesang, Robert Schumanns Dichterliebe, Gustav Mahlers Lieder eines fahrenden Gesellen, Erich Wolfgang Korngolds Songs of the Clown, Hanns Eislers and Ernste Gesänge. He had his debut as Liedersänger at the Schubertiade Mauerbach in 2009 and gave song recitals in Mexico, the United States, Spain, France, England, Italy, the Czech Republic, Hungary, Switzerland, Norway, Slovakia, Poland, Germany, and Austria.

He founded the Marcel Rubin Quartet together with violinist, Lukas Medlam. He performed with the quartet at: the Maison Heinrich Heine, in Paris, Carnegie Hall in New York, the Theatre of the Schönbrunn Palace, at the Museo Nacional de San Carlos in Mexico City, and at the Kunsthalle Basel.

== Collaborations ==
He has collaborated with pianists such as Matthias Lademann, Christian Koch, Jozef Olechowski; Musical Directors like: Jesús López Cobos, Marc Albrecht, Josep Caballé Domenech, and Christof Ulrich Meier; and orchestras including: the Vienna Symphony and the Vienna Radio Symphony Orchestra; and with stage directors such as: Patrice Chéreau, Christof Loy, Torsten Fischer, Emilio Sagi, and Ron Daniels.

== Music of exiled composers and research ==
Together with musicologist Professor Dr. Gerold Gruber of the University of Music and Performing Arts, Vienna, Director of the Research Center M.A.E.D. (Music Analysis and Exile Documentation Research Center), he researched Austrian and German composers who fled to Mexico during World War II. Another focus of their research concerned artists such as Anna Seghers, Egon Kisch, and Marcel Rubin who were helped during the war by Gilberto Bosques, also known as the Mexican Schindler. He helped more than 44,000 people by providing them with visas to Mexico.

== Primavera Festival Wien ==
In 2013, he founded the Primavera Festival which concentrates on the Mexican-Austrian relationship and is a festival against racism and discrimination, and for tolerance and openness. The concerts were held at the concert hall of the United Nations Office at Vienna and at the concert hall of the Diplomatic Academy of Vienna with his chamber orchestra the Valsassina Ensemble. The most important days of the festival were International Women's Day, the day Mexico was the only country to protest the Anschluss (annexation) of Austria by the Third Reich in March 1938, and the International Day for the Elimination of Racial Discrimination which is held on 21 March. The repertoire focused on compositions by composers forced into exile or female composers.

== Conceptual art ==
In September 2014, Castillo made his debut as a conceptual artist with David Lamelas at the Kunsthalle Basel. This project was done in cooperation with the Mexican/American composer, pianist and visual artist Gavin Gamboa and dealt with the relation between sound and the mass of the space. The composition represents sonically the number of cubic meters at the Oberlichtsaal of the Kunsthalle.

== Discography ==
In 2011, he recorded his first album with Preiser Records Vienna at the Casino Baumgarten in Vienna.
