= Sebastian Lang-Lessing =

German conductor

- Born: 1966 (age 59–60)
- Genre: opera

Sebastian Lang-Lessing (born 1966) is a German conductor.

== Early life and career ==
Lang-Lessing was born in Gelsenkirchen, North Rhine-Westphalia, Germany. His father was a pediatrician, and his mother was a physical therapist. He had three older sisters.

Lang-Lessing received the Ferenc Fricsay Award at age 24. He started his career at the Hamburg State Opera as an assistant conductor. He subsequently became resident conductor at the Deutsche Oper Berlin. He was chief conductor of the Tasmanian Symphony Orchestra from 2004 to 2011. He has served as chief conductor and artistic director of the Opera National de Lorraine.

Lang-Lessing was the music director of the San Antonio Symphony from 2010 to 2020.

Together with Niki Vasilakis and the Tasmanian Symphony Orchestra Lang-Lessing was nominated for the 2006 ARIA Award for Best Classical Album for the album Mendelssohn, Bruch, Ravel.

== Awards and nominations ==
=== ARIA Music Awards ===
The ARIA Music Awards is an annual awards ceremony held by the Australian Recording Industry Association. They commenced in 1987.

Year	Nominee / work	Award	Result	Ref.
2006	Mendelssohn, Bruch, Ravel (with Tasmanian Symphony Orchestra & Niki Vasilakis)	Best Classical Album	Nominated	

Cultural offices
Preceded by Jérôme Kaltenbach	Music Director, Orchestre symphonique et lyrique de Nancy; 1999–2006	Succeeded by Paolo Olmi
Preceded by Ola Rudner	Chief Conductor, Tasmanian Symphony Orchestra; 2004–2011	Succeeded by Marko Letonja
Preceded by Larry Rachleff	Music Director, San Antonio Symphony; 2010–2020	Succeeded by None
