= Robert Harth =

Robert Harth (June 13, 1956, Louisville, Kentucky – January 30, 2004, New York, New York) was Carnegie Hall's executive and artistic director. He had become the head of Carnegie Hall September 8, 2001 mere days before September 11, 2001. He died of a massive heart attack at home in his apartment in Carnegie Towers at the age of 47.

He was the son of violinist and conductor Sidney Harth and violinist Teresa Testa Harth. At age 23 he became executive director of the Los Angeles Philharmonic, and alter spent 12 years as director of the Aspen Music Festival and School.
