= Sayaka Shoji =

Japanese classical violinist (born 1983)

Sayaka Shoji 庄司 紗矢香
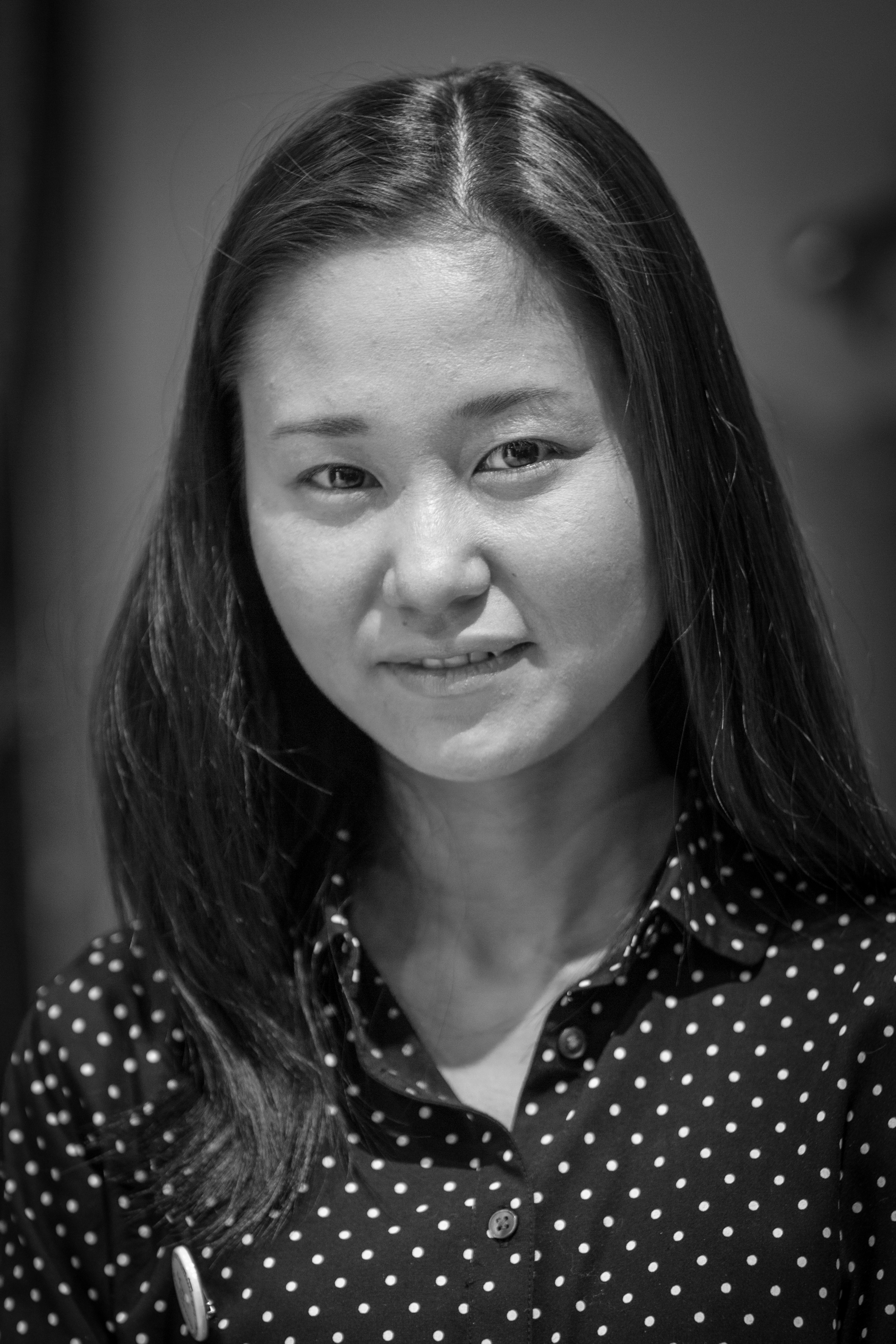
- Sayaka Shoji in 2014

Background information
- Born: January 30, 1983 (age 43); Tokyo, Japan
- Occupation: Violinist
- Years active: 1995-present
- Website: sayakashoji.com

Sayaka Shoji (庄司 紗矢香, Shōji Sayaka; born 30 January 1983) is a Japanese classical violinist. She was the first Japanese and youngest winner at the Paganini Competition in Genoa in 1999.

== Biography ==
Shoji was born in Tokyo into an artistic family (her mother is a painter; her grandmother, a poet) and spent her early childhood in Siena, Italy. When she was 5 years old her family moved back to Japan, where she started studying the violin. From 1995 until 2000, she studied at the Accademia Musicale Chigiana under Uto Ughi and Riccardo Brengola. At the age of 13, she went to Germany for a year to study with Saschko Gawriloff. In 1998, she moved to Germany to study at Hochschule für Musik Köln under Zakhar Bron and graduated in 2004. She then continued her study with Gawriloff and also took masterclasses of Shlomo Mintz.

In 1997, she made her debut at Lucerne Festival and Musikverein in Vienna with Rudolf Baumgartner. Two years later, she took the First Prize at the 1999 Paganini Competition. Zubin Mehta has been her strong supporter. When Shoji auditioned for him in 2000, he immediately changed his schedule in order to make her first recording with the Israel Philharmonic possible in the following month, then invited her to perform with Bavarian State Opera and Los Angeles Philharmonic.

Since then many prominent orchestras have invited Shoji, including Berlin Philharmonic, London Symphony Orchestra, Philharmonia Orchestra, New York Philharmonic, San Francisco Symphony, Baltimore Symphony, St. Petersburg Philharmonic Orchestra, Orchestra dell'Accademia Nazionale di Santa Cecilia and WDR Symphony Orchestra under the baton of Lorin Maazel, Sir Colin Davis, Wolfgang Sawallisch, Esa-Pekka Salonen, Kurt Masur, Mariss Jansons, Yuri Temirkanov, Valery Gergiev, Myung-whun Chung and Semyon Bychkov.

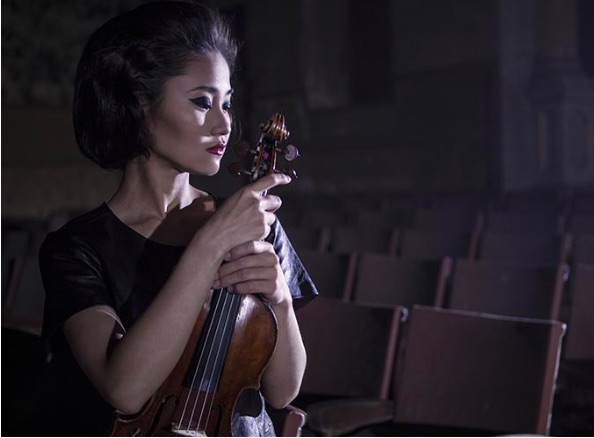
Sayaka Shoji

Shoji records with Deutsche Grammophon. Until 2009 she used the 1715 Joachim Stradivarius on loan from the Nippon Music Foundation; today she plays the 1729 Recamier Stradivarius on loan from Ryuzo Ueno, Honorary Chairman, Ueno Fine Chemicals Industry, Ltd.

== Discography ==
Title	Artists	Label	Year
Paganini: Violin Concerto No.1; Chausson: Poéme; Waxman: Carmen Fantasy; Milstein: Paganiniana	Zubin Mehta (conductor): Israel Philharmonic Orchestra	Deutsche Grammophon	2000
Live at the Louvre	Itamar Golan (piano)	Deutsche Grammophon	2003
Tchaikovsky and Mendelssohn Violin Concertos	Myung-Whun Chung (conductor): Orchestre Philharmonique de Radio France	Deutsche Grammophon	2003
Prokofiev Violin Sonatas & Shostakovich Preludes	Itamar Golan (piano)	Deutsche Grammophon	2005
Prelude	Itamar Golan (piano); Zubin Mehta (conductor); Myung-Whun Chung (conductor); Israel Philharmonic Orchestra; Orchestre Philharmonique de Radio France	Deutsche Grammophon	
Verbier Festival Highlights 2007	Various including: Hélène Grimaud (piano), Renaud Capuçon (violin), Lars Anders Tomter (viola), Mischa Maisky (cello)	medici arts	2008
Beethoven: Violin Sonata Nos.2 & 9	Gianluca Cascioli (piano)	Deutsche Grammophon	2010
Bach & Reger: Works for Violin Solo: Sonatas, partitas, preludes & fugues		Mirare	2010
Shostakovich: Violin Concerto Nos.1 & 2	Dmitri Liss (conductor): Ural Philharmonic Orchestra	Mirare	2011
Beethoven: Violin Sonata Nos.7 & 8	Gianluca Cascioli (piano)	Deutsche Grammophon	
Beethoven: Violin Sonata Nos. 1, 3 & 4	Gianluca Cascioli (piano)	Deutsche Grammophon	
Prokofiev: Violin Concerto Nos. 1 & 2	Yuri Temirkanov (conductor): St. Petersburg Philharmonic Orchestra	Deutsche Grammophon	2014
Beethoven: Violin Sonata Nos. 5, 6 & 10	Gianluca Cascioli (piano)	Deutsche Grammophon	
Live: Mozart, Schubert, Brahms	Menahem Pressler (piano)	Deutsche Grammophon	2015
Beethoven & Sibelius: Violin Concertos	Yuri Temirkanov (conductor): St. Petersburg Philharmonic Orchestra	Deutsche Grammophon	2018
