= Marta Gardolińska =

Polish conductor

Marta Gardolińska (born 1988, Warsaw) is a Polish conductor.

== Biography ==
Gardolińska began piano studies at age six. She also began to participate in athletics from a very young age, including swimming from age three and acrobatics from age five. Her interest in conducting originated during her time as a chorister, where she gained her first lessons in conducting from her school choir director Katarzyna Sokołowska. She studied flute and conducting at the Chopin University of Music in Warsaw, where she organised her first appearance as a conductor, with a performance of the Stabat Mater of Pergolesi, during her second year of studies in Warsaw. From 2010 to 2014, she continued her music studies at the University of Music and Performing Arts Vienna, including conducting and choral singing, where her teachers included Mark Stringer, Yuji Yuasa and Erwin Ortner. Whilst in Vienna, she became a member of the Arnold Schoenberg Choir and the Wiener Singverein. She also studied music physiology in Vienna, informed by her youthful athletics experiences, which also included middle-distance running and gymnastics along with her earlier training. She took conducting courses at the Pierre Monteux School, and has participated in conducting master classes with conductors such as Nicolás Pasquet, Bernard Haitink, Péter Eötvös and Bertrand de Billy.

From March 2017 to June 2018, Gardolińska was the conductor of the TU Orchester Wien (Orchester der Technischen Universität Wien), the only female conductor in the orchestra's history. She held a Taki Alsop Conducting Fellowship for the period 2017–2019. From 2018 to 2020, she was the 'Young Conductor in Association' with the Bournemouth Symphony Orchestra. For the 2019–2020 season, she was a Dudamel Fellow with the Los Angeles Philharmonic Orchestra. With the Los Angeles Philharmonic, she was the second conductor for the orchestra's commercial recording of the Symphony No. 4 of Charles Ives.

In October 2020, Gardolińska first guest-conducted the Opéra national de Lorraine in the French premiere of Der Traumgörge of Alexander von Zemlinsky. On the basis of this appearance, in January 2021, the Opéra national de Lorraine announced the appointment of Gardolińska as its next music director, effective with the 2021–2022 season, with an initial contract of three seasons. Gardolińska is the first female conductor ever named music director of Opéra national de Lorraine. In April 2024, the company announced the extension of Gardolińska's contract as music director through the 2025–2026 season. Gardolińska concluded her tenure with the Opéra national de Lorraine at the close of the 2025–2026 season.

Gardolińska first guest-conducted the Barcelona Symphony Orchestra and National Orchestra of Catalonia (OBC) in April 2021. In February 2022, the OBC announced the appointment of Gardolińska as its next principal guest conductor, effective September 2022, with a contract of two seasons.

Gardolińska is married to the Venezuelan pianist and composer Alfredo Ovalles. The couple have a son, born in January 2023.

Cultural offices
Preceded by Juan Sebastián Acosta	Conductor, Orchester der Technischen Universität Wien; 2017–2018	Succeeded by Paul-Boris Kertsman
Preceded by Rani Calderon	Music Director, Opéra national de Lorraine; 2021–2026	Succeeded by (post vacant)
