= New York Youth Symphony =

American youth music organization

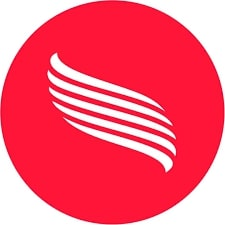

Background information
- Origin: New York, New York, United States
- Genres: Classical, popular music, soundtrack, new-age, musical theatre, film score
- Occupations: Symphony orchestra
- Years active: 1963 – present
- Members: Executive Director; John Kilkenny; Music Director; Andrew Jinhong Kim; Assistant Conductor; Daniel Jaggers; Concertmaster; Elizabeth (Poppy) Song; Orchestra Manager; Jennifer Ahn; Music Director of Crescendo Orchestra; Tanatchaya "Tanya" Chanphanitpornkit; Director of the Chamber Music Program; Lisa Tipton; Jazz Band Director; Michael Thomas; Composition Director; Kyle Blaha; Director of Artistic Operations; Jeremiah Adriano
- Website: www.nyys.org
- Notable Alumni: Marin Alsop, Gerard Schwarz, Cho-Liang Lin

The New York Youth Symphony (NYYS), founded in 1963, is a music organization for the youth in New York City, widely reputed to be one of the best of its kind in the nation and world. Its programs include its flagship Orchestra, Chamber Music, Jazz, Apprentice Conducting, Composition, and Musical Theater Songwriting Programs. Its members range from 12 to 22 years of age. NYYS members are said to include the most talented young musicians in the New York metropolitan area. In 2023, the New York Youth Symphony won the Grammy Award for Best Orchestral Performance at the 65th Annual Grammy Awards.

The NYYS is also a leader in classical music. Its First Music commissioning program, established in 1984, selects composers under the age of 30 to write works for the programs. Commissions have included composers such as David Lang, Augusta Read Thomas, Julia Wolfe, and Aaron Jay Kernis.

== Orchestra ==
The Orchestra Program, the flagship program of the NYYS, seeks orchestral talent in the New York area from ages 12 to 22. In 2010, the New York Times wrote: "its players ... are sufficiently devoted to the music that when they perform at Carnegie Hall ... they produce a sound that would do an adult orchestra proud, in programs built largely of cornerstones of the standard canon."

The orchestra performs three concerts per year, each of which is performed at Carnegie Hall. Each program usually includes a cornerstone of the orchestral repertoire and a premiere of a commissioned work. Usually, a soloist or soloists perform either an established artist or a young artist as presented by the Roy and Shirley Durst Debut Series, which was founded in 1997. The first Durst artist was Alisa Weilerstein.

The orchestra has not appointed established educators to fill its role as music director. Rather, it has had music directors who at the time were young. The music directors of the orchestra have included:

- David Epstein (1963–66)
- Leonard Slatkin (1966–68)
- Richard Holmes (1968–69)
- Isaiah Jackson (1969–73)
- David Stahl (1973–74)
- Kenneth Jean (1974–76)
- Myung-Whun Chung (1976–77)
- Robert Hart Baker (1977–81)
- Salvatore Scecchitano (1981–82)
- David Alan Miller (1982–88)
- Samuel Wong (1988–93)
- Miguel Harth Bedoya (1993–97)
- Mischa Santora (1997–2002)
- Paul Haas (2002–07)
- Ryan McAdams (2007–12)
- Joshua Gersen (2012–2017)
- Michael Repper (2017–2023)

Andrew Jihong Kim is the current music director with assistant conductor Adrian Rogers.

== Chamber music ==
The Chamber Music Program (CMP) provides musicians aged 12 to 22 the opportunity to participate in chamber ensembles of a variety of instrumentations. The current director is Dr. Lisa Tipton of the Meridian Quartet.

The program uses established musicians teach master classes for the students. Past coaches have included:

- Claude Frank, concert pianist
- Kazuhide Isomura, viola, The Tokyo Quartet
- Kathe Jarka, Alexander teacher
- Gilbert Kalish, concert pianist
- Ani Kavafian, violin/viola, Chamber Music Society of Lincoln Center
- Alan Kay, clarinet, Orpheus Program Coordinator
- Joel Krosnick, cello, Juilliard String Quartet
- Anne-Marie McDermott, piano
- Frank Morelli, bassoon, Orpheus Chamber Orchestra
- Charles Neidich, clarinet, faculty of the Juilliard School
- Daniel Phillips, violin, The Orion Quartet
- Shanghai Quartet members
- Fred Sherry, cello, Chamber Music Society of Lincoln Center
- Carol Wincenc, flute, The New York Woodwind Quintet
- Carmit Zori, violin

== Jazz Band ==
The New York Youth Symphony Jazz Band is a 17-member big band dedicated to studying, rehearsing, and performing jazz music. Modeled on the bands of the 1930s and 1940s, Jazz Band preserves this heritage and, keeping with jazz traditions, incorporates it into the current and emerging styles that define the genre for the present generation. The Jazz Band performs at venues across New York City, including Birdland and Jazz at Lincoln Center.

The Jazz Band has featured soloists and clinicians such as Joe Lovano, Maria Schneider, Conrad Herwig, Steve Turre, Warren Vaché, Victor Goines, Slide Hampton, Jimmy Heath, Joe Locke, Eric Reed, Lew Soloff, Gary Smulyan, and Frank Wess, giving students a chance to play alongside professional musicians.

== Composition ==
The Composition Program is a series of workshops for young musicians to study composition and orchestration. The current director is Kyle Blaha, who succeeded Anna Clyne, four-time winner of ASCAP Plus award. The founding director was Derek Bermel.

Guest lecturers have included:

- Laurie Anderson, violin
- Robert Beaser, composer
- Christopher Theofanidis, composer
- Jennifer Higdon, composer
- Paquito D'Rivera, jazz clarinet and saxophone
- ETHEL
- Nico Muhly
- Stephen Sondheim
- John Corigliano
- Aaron Jay Kernis, composer
- Steve Reich, composer
- Kathleen Supové, piano

== Alumni ==
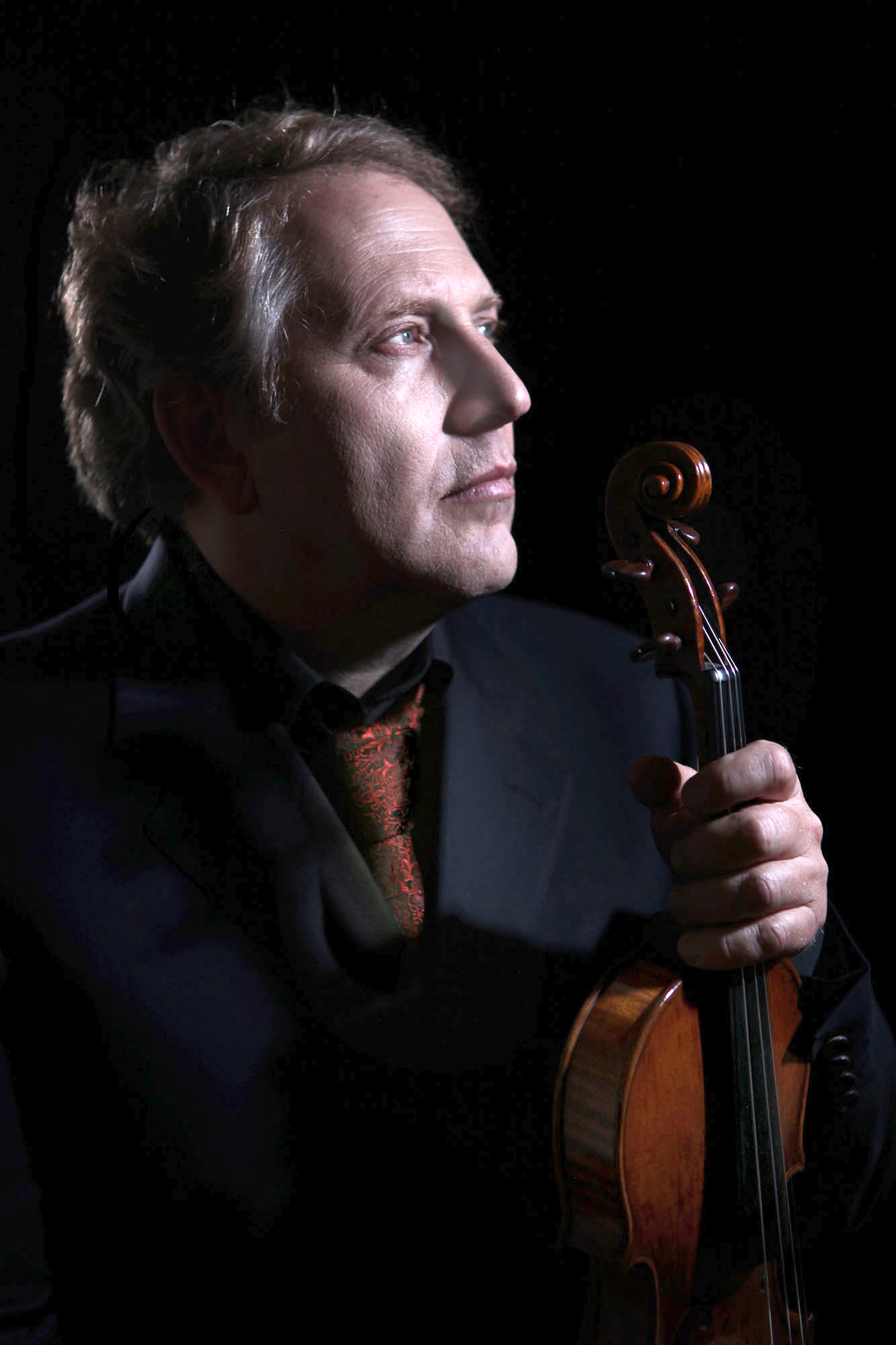
Shlomo Mintz

Alumni include violinists Marin Alsop, Pamela Frank, Cho-Liang Lin, Shlomo Mintz, and Peter Oundjian; violist Lawrence Dutton; conductor and trumpeter Gerard Schwarz; flutist Ransom Wilson; and members of the Juilliard, Emerson, Tokyo, Shanghai, and Mendelssohn String Quartets, the Metropolitan Opera Orchestra, the New York Philharmonic, the Gewandhaus Orchestra of Leipzig, the Israel Philharmonic, the London Symphony Orchestra, and other major ensembles throughout the world.

== Reviews ==
New York's major arts reviews regularly critique the symphony's concerts:

Because the New York Youth Symphony is a student ensemble that draws on musicians ranging in age from 12 to 22, it can be easy to forget, from season to season, just how good it is. But its Carnegie Hall concerts have often been startling. Its programs are built around repertory cornerstones, which these musicians appear not to find daunting, and each concert includes the premiere of a commissioned work as well. The performance level is almost always what you would expect from a full-time, professional adult orchestra, and this group outshines some of the adult ensembles that parade across New York stages night after night ... After the intermission, Mr. McAdams conducted a sharply articulated, thoughtfully shaped performance of Mussorgsky's 'Pictures at an Exhibition.' It was the kind of reading that made a listener prize the details of Ravel's orchestration more than ever, both as a textbook demonstration of orchestral color and for giving this already vivid piano score a measure of depth and shading that Mussorgsky could never have achieved. Mr. McAdams's contribution here was an emphasis on the music's extremes of clarity and mystery, delicacy and grandeur.

— Allan Kozinn, December 2, 2008

The Youth Symphony is an accomplished, ambitious group of players ranging in age from 12 to 22. Mr. McAdams's tenure follows that of Paul Haas, a charismatic conductor whose adventurous programs drew attention to the orchestra ... A rousing account of Stravinsky's "Firebird" Suite (1919) offered further compelling evidence that the Youth Symphony is in good hands with Mr. McAdams.

— Steve Smith, December 11, 2007

The New York Sun has called the orchestra "America's best youth symphony."

== Controversy ==
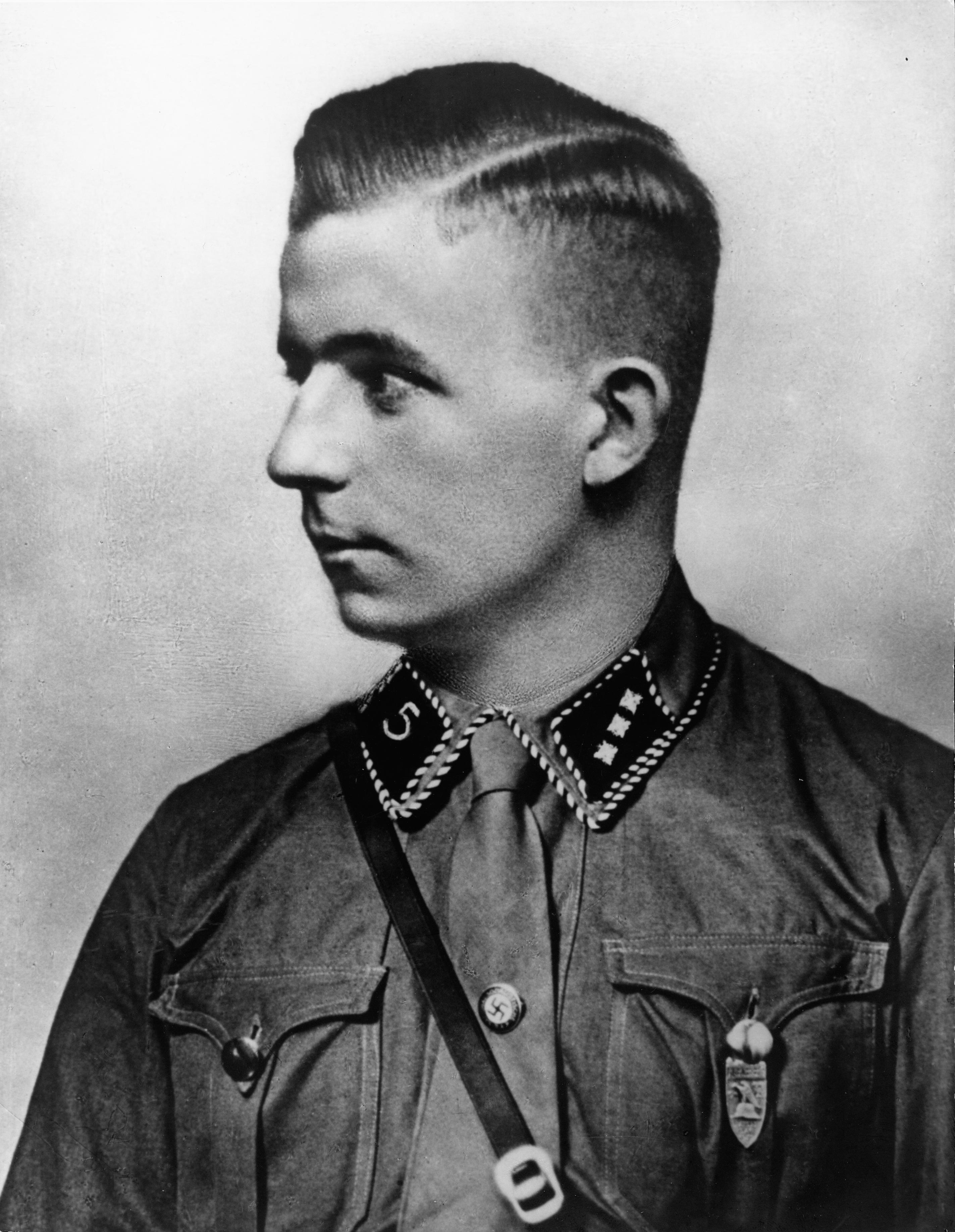
Sturmführer Horst Wessel, composer of the Horst Wessel Song

The New York Youth Symphony abruptly canceled the Carnegie Hall performance of a piece it had commissioned after it was discovered to include a 45-second musical quote of the Horst Wessel Song, written by Sturmführer Horst Wessel, a district leader in Hitler's Sturmabteilung (SA). An anthem of the Nazi Party from 1930 to 1945, it is now banned in Germany and Austria.

The canceled performance was of "Marsh u Nebuttya" ("March to Oblivion," in Ukrainian), a commissioned 9-minute piece composed by Estonian-born Jonas Tarm, a 21-year-old junior at the New England Conservatory of Music. Shauna Quill, executive director of the symphony, said the decision to pull the piece was informed by Tarm's refusal, when asked, to explain why the excerpt is included in the work. Tarm said: "I really do believe it can speak for itself." In a later statement, Tarm added that the piece is "devoted to the victims who have suffered from cruelty and hatred of war, totalitarianism, polarizing nationalism — in the past and today."
