= Carols in the Domain =

Annual Christmas song concert in Sydney

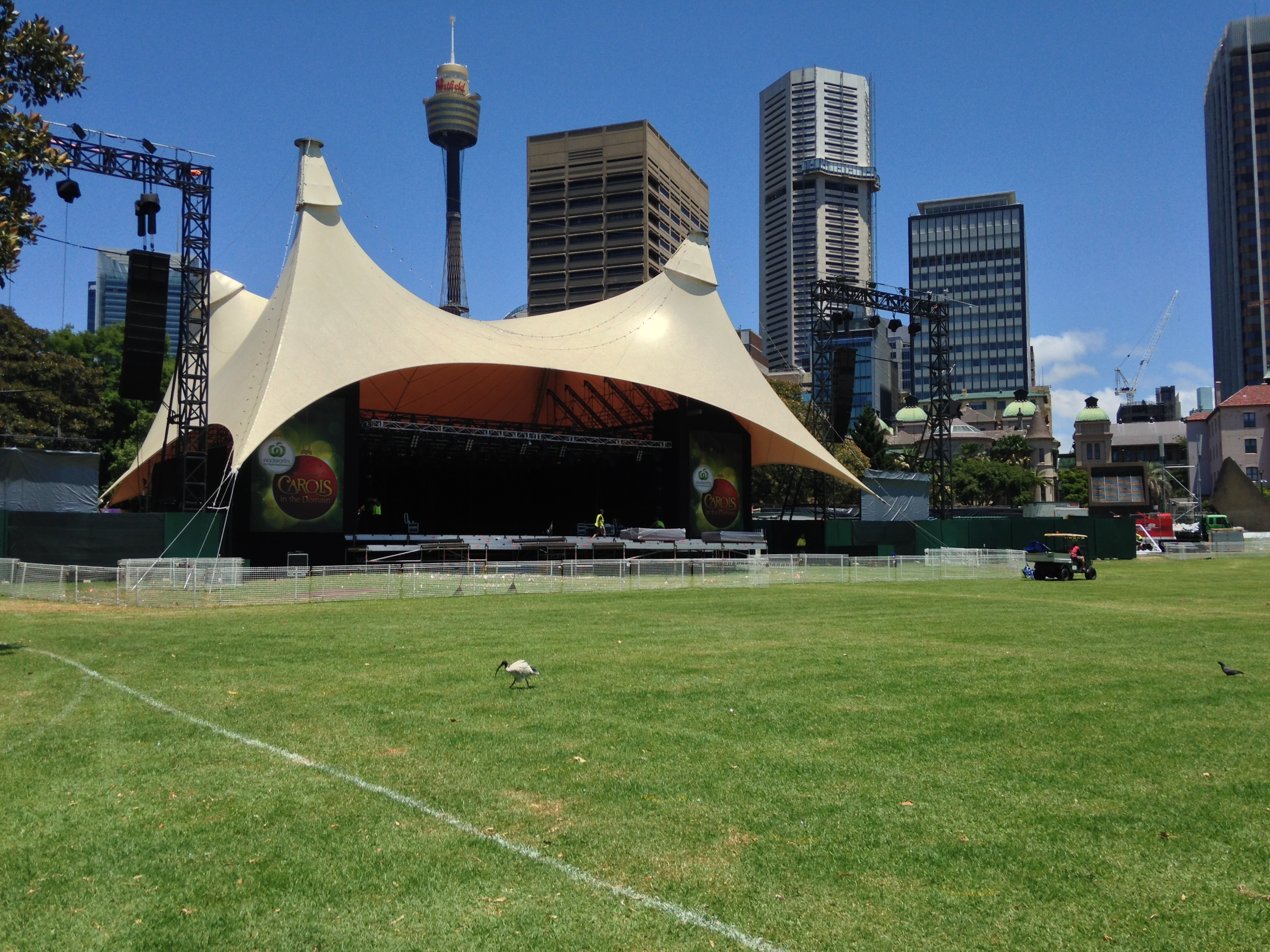
- The Domain, Sydney, the venue of the Carols
- Locations: The Domain, Sydney, New South Wales, Australia
- Years active: 1983–present
- Website: carolsinthedomain.com

Carols in the Domain is an annual Australian Christmas concert event held in The Domain in Sydney, New South Wales, Australia. It began in 1983, and features many national and international performers and guest appearances. It is a free event, broadcast around Australia on the Nine Network since 2026 and simulcast previously on Smooth FM and currently, on the Hit Network since 2023. The event was held on the last Saturday before Christmas Eve until 2015, before moving to the last Sunday before Christmas Eve since 2016, and has been held on the third Saturday in December since 2021. Carols in the Domain has become one of Australia's largest free Christmas events.

== History ==
Carols in the Domain was started in 1983 by former Qantas employee Robyn Anne Hobbs, who observed Christmas carol events in Australia and wanted to develop one for Sydney. In an article in The Sydney Morning Herald, she said "I suppose I started Carols in the Domain from a purely selfish point of view because I'm an only child and Christmas and birthdays were always wonderful occasions to celebrate and yet Sydney didn't really have a major Christmas celebration." She chose The Salvation Army as the corresponding charity. The first Carols event in 1983 was attended by 15,000 people. Hosts of the event have included presenters of morning program Sunrise particularly David Koch and Natalie Barr who have co-presented on several occasions, previous presenters have also included Andrew Daddo (on seven occasions), Grant Denyer, (five occasions), Kate Ritchie, (three occasions) and Barry Crocker (three occasions).

Hobbs was awarded an Order of Australia Medal (OAM – General Division) in 2009 for services to the community in founding Carols in the Domain and her fundraising efforts for the Salvation Army

The main sponsor is designated with naming rights. In 1989, the main sponsor was Esso. In 1996, the main sponsor was Pacific Power, however, because the government had split up the company, they could not fund the sponsorship, but the state government stepped in to sponsor the event, pledging over AUS$300,000. The event was televised for the first time to New Zealand on TVNZ and Southeast Asia on Australia Television. The Sydney Morning Herald also became a sponsor for the event.

In 1997, the naming rights sponsor was RAMS Home Loans. In 2004, the event was called "The Good Guys Good Kid Carols in the Domain". In 2005, the naming rights were assumed to be The Good Guys again, but Woolworths acquired the naming rights and renamed the event to "Woolworths Carols in the Domain". The name remained unchanged until 2025, when The Salvation Army became the event's new naming rights sponsor.

As a mark of respect, organisers of the 2014 Carols in the Domain considered cancelling the event because of the Martin Place siege which took place in Sydney earlier that week, but instead decided to hold it, on Saturday 20 December. The 2014 Carols attracted approximately 80,000 people, and also included a tribute to those killed during the siege. Mark Vincent opened the evening by singing "You Raise Me Up" in honour of the victims, and a minute silence was held.

In December 2020, it was announced that the 2020 event would be held inside at the Aware Theatre without any audience as a response to the COVID-19 pandemic, and then televised on Wednesday 23 December on Channel 7.

In September 2023, it was announced that Southern Cross Austereo's Hit Network had become the official radio partner of the Carols.

In September 2026, it was announced Nine Network had acquired the rights to broadcast the event from 2026, with new hosts Ally Langdon and James Bracey.

== Charity ==
Carols in the Domain supports both The Salvation Army and The Salvation Army OASIS Youth Support Network through the sale of candle bags during the performance. Oasis seeks to assist homeless youths aged between 16 and 24 in the inner city of Sydney with emergency housing, case management and training.

== List of events ==
All events have included a visit by Santa Claus, and music from local orchestras and choirs.

Date	Broadcast Network	Hosts	Guests	Orchestra and choir	Musical director	Refs
20 December 1986			Normie Rowe, Jackie Love, Fabulous Singlettes, Don Spencer	Sydney Conservatorium Orchestra and Chorale, Young Sydney Singers		
19 December 1987				2MBS FM Children's Choir		
17 December 1988	Seven Network		Ian Turpie	Normie Rowe		
22 December 1990	Seven Network	Barry Crocker	Tina Arena, Jackie Trent, Jeanne Little, Grace Knight, Clare Gormley, Sesame Street Cast	Sydney Youth Orchestra, The Salvation Army Massed Choirs, Cafe of the Gate of Salvation		
21 December 1991	Seven Network	Barry Crocker and Jackie Love	Judith Durham, David Hobson, Suzanne Clachair, Mickey and Minnie	The Australian Girls Choir		
19 December 1992	Seven Network	Barry Crocker and Jackie Love	Jeanne Little, Suzanne Johnston, Gregory Tomlinson, Peter Cousens, The Wilson Family Singers, John Williamson, Georgie Parker, Tom Burlinson, Noel Ferrier, June Bronhill, The Tin Lids, Tony Hatch, Jackie Trent and Disney (ft. Mickey Mouse, Minnie Mouse, Donald Duck, Goofy, Pluto, Daisy Duck and Scrooge McDuck)	The Salvation Army Choir, The Sydney Youth Orchestra.		
18 December 1993	Seven Network		Girlfriend, Toni Pearen, Jackie Love, Rob Guest, Suzanne Johnston, David Hobson, The Wiggles, Lee Kernaghan and Tara Morice	The Salvation Army Choir, The Sydney Youth Orchestra.		
17 December 1994	Seven Network	Rob Guest	Julie Anthony, Jeffrey Black, The 4 Trax, Eden Gaha, Gina Jeffreys, Toni Pearen, The Wiggles, Rick Price, Jackie Trent, Miriam Gormley, Cinderella Cast, Janice Breen Showgroup	Sydney Children's Choir, Philharmonic Choir, Sydney Youth Orchestra		
23 December 1995	Seven Network	Rob Guest	Julie Anthony, Peter Cousens, Andrew Daddo, The Wiggles, Monica Trapaga, Home and Away’s Tempany Deckert, Kate Ritchie and Katrina Hobbs, stars of Miss Saigon, Jennifer McGregor, Margaret Urlich, John Waters, Lisa McCune, Janice Breen Showgroup	Sydney Youth Orchestra, Philharmonic Choir, Victorian Boys' Choir	Michael Harvey	
21 December 1996	Seven Network	Noni Hazlehurst and John Jarratt	Belinda Emmett, Julia Morris, Human Nature, Troy Cassar-Daley, Georgie Parker and Jim Walton, Miriam Gormley, Roger Lemke, Gregory Tomlinson, Peter Cousens and Maree Johnson, Sharon Millerchip, Adriana de Caires, Peter Combe, Sesame Street cast, Disney Channel, Disney's Snow White, the Prince and Dopey, The Wiggles, Janice Breen Showgroup.	Sydney Youth Orchestra, Philharmonic Choir, Victorian Boys' Choir	Michael Harvey	
20 December 1997	Seven Network	Noni Hazlehurst and John Jarratt	Ghillian Sullivan, Roger Lemke, Hugh Jackman, Monica Trapaga, Home and Away stars, Madison McKoy, Disney Channel's Mickey, Minnie, Chip and Dale, Santa Goofy, Pluto, Donald, The Wiggles, Janice Breen Showgroup		Michael Harvey	
19 December 1998	Seven Network	Hugh Jackman and Monica Trapaga	Belinda Emmett, CDB, Marie Johnston, David Hobson, Peter Cousens, Dan Tullis Jr., Simon Gallaher, Georgie Parker, Peter Combe, Georgie Parker, Troy Cassar-Daley, John Rowe, Leigh Archer, Janice Breen Showgroup, The Wiggles, Disney Channel (ft. Mickey Mouse, Minnie Mouse, Donald Duck, Goofy, Chip and Dale Rescue Rangers, Pocahontas, Meeko, Aladdin, Jasmine, Baloo and Louie from TaleSpin)	Sydney Youth Orchestra, University of Western Sydney Choir, Leichhardt Espresso Chorus	Michael Harvey	
18 December 1999	Seven Network	Andrew Daddo and Belinda Emmett	Vanessa Amorosi, Lisa McCune and The Sound of Music's Von Trapp children, Vika and Linda, The Wiggles, Adam Brand, Ignatius Jones, Disney Channel (ft. Mickey, Minnie, Donald, Goofy and Pluto), Monica Trapaga, Janice Breen Showgroup		Michael Harvey	
23 December 2000	Seven Network	Andrew Daddo and Katrina Warren	Anthony Warlow, Amelia Farrugia, Peter Hobson, Nikki Webster, Belinda Emmett, Adam Brand, Bardot, Jimmy Little, Todd McKenney, Caroline Craig, Glenn Shorrock, Rachel Marley, Doug Parkinson, Danielle G'aha, Tim Draxl, Morgan Crowley, Maryanne Fogarty, The Wiggles, Monica Trapaga, Mickey Mouse, Minnie Mouse, Janice Breen Showgroup	Sydney Youth Orchestra, Singers 2000, Australian Youth Choir, Beethoven Society	Michael Harvey	
22 December 2001	Seven Network	Andrew Daddo and Katrina Warren	Caroline Craig, Nikki Webster, Sister2Sister, Simon Burke, Bardot, Rob Guest, Clare Gormley, Troy Cassar-Daley, Georgie Parker, Hayley Westenra, Beccy Cole, Amelia Farrugia, Scandal'us, The Wiggles, Monica Trapaga, The Disney Channel with Colin Buchanan, Mickey and Minnie, Goofy, Donald and Daisy, Pluto, Winnie the Pooh, Tigger, Eeyore, Janice Breen Showgroup	Sydney Youth Orchestra, Tenor Australis, Beethoven Society Choir	Michael Harvey	
21 December 2002	Seven Network	Andrew Daddo and Katrina Warren	Rob Guest, Julie Anthony, Adam Brand, Rebecca Cartwright, Tom Burlinson, Caroline Craig, Cameron Daddo, Belinda Emmett, David Hobson, Marcia Hines, Melinda Schneider, Selwyn, Shu Cheen Yu, Katie Underwood, Wayne Scott Kermond, Scott Cain, Daniel Bowden, Natasha Lee, Carolettes, The Wiggles, Disney Channel (ft. Sorcerer Mickey), Janice Breen Showgroup, John Farnham	Sydney Youth Orchestra, Beethoven Society Choir, Australian Girls Choir, Jubilation Gospel Choir	Michael Harvey	
20 December 2003	Seven Network	Andrew Daddo and Katrina Warren	Kane Alexander, Julie Anthony, Rachael Beck, The Carolettes, Troy Cassar-Daley, Peter Cousens, Eran, Amelia Farrugia, David Hobson, Stars of The Lion King, Todd McKenney, Mercury 4, Amanda Muggleton, Georgie Parker, s2s, Melinda Schneider, Katie Underwood, The Wiggles, Disney Channel, Janice Breen Showgroup	Sydney Youth Orchestra, Beethoven Society Choir, Australian Girls Choir, Jubilation Gospel Choir	Michael Harvey	
18 December 2004	Seven Network	Andrew Daddo and Bec Cartwright	Casey Donovan, Kane Alexander, Rachael Beck, Ian Stenlake, Bella, Tim Campbell, Cosima De Vito, Clare Gormley, David Hobson, Janice Breen Showgroup, Lee Kernaghan, Todd McKenney, Andrew O'Keefe, Chloe Dallimore, Guy Sebastian, Reg Livermore, Cast of We Will Rock You, Ross Wilson, Shu Cheen Yu, The Wiggles	Sydney Youth Orchestra, Beethoven Society Choir, Australian Girls Choir, Jubilation Gospel Choir	Michael Harvey	
17 December 2005	Seven Network	Andrew Daddo and Jennifer Hawkins	Todd McKenney, Sophie Monk, Shannon Noll, the Janice Breen Showgroup, Georgie Parker, Paulini, Human Nature, Christine Anu, Nikki Webster, Tim Campbell, Adam Brand, Beccy Cole, Amelia Farrugia, Tenor Australis, a Disney spectacular (ft. Mickey Mouse, Minnie Mouse, Donald Duck and Daisy Duck), The Wiggles, Patrizio Buanne, Leo Sayer, David Hasselhoff	Sydney Youth Orchestra, The Salvation Army Choir, Jubilation	Michael Harvey	
16 December 2006	Seven Network	Grant Denyer and Shelley Craft	Adam Harvey, Chloe Dallimore, Damien Leith, David Hobson, Deni Hines, Guy Sebastian, Human Nature, Jade MacRae, The Janice Breen Showgroup, Melinda Schneider, MiG, Rachael Beck, Raggs, The Wiggles, Tim Campbell, Young Divas, Yvonne Kenny NOTE: The first year Sam Moran filled in for Greg Page as yellow wiggle.	Sydney Youth Orchestra, The Salvation Army Choir, Australian Girls Choir, Jubilation	Michael Harvey	
22 December 2007	Seven Network	Kate Ritchie and Grant Denyer	Tina Arena, Yvonne Kenny, Christine Anu, Tim Campbell, Rachael Beck, Adam Brand, Troy Cassar-Daley, Songbirds, Raggs, The Wiggles, Doug Parkinson, Human Nature, Paulini, Janice Breen Showgroup, David Hobson, Ricki-Lee Coulter, Ross Wilson, Alvin and the Chipmunks	Sydney Youth Orchestra, The Salvation Army Choir, Australian Girls Choir, Jubilation, Australian Contemporary Singers	Michael Harvey, Jamie Rigg	
20 December 2008	Seven Network	Kate Ritchie and Grant Denyer	Brian McFadden, Shannon Noll, Guy Sebastian, Paulini, Delta Goodrem, Charli Robinson, Melinda Schneider, David Hobson, High School Musical on Stage!, Christine Anu, Deni Hines, The Wiggles, University of Newcastle Chamber Choir, Rachael Beck, Amelia Farrugia, ARYA, Janice Breen Showgroup, Justine Clarke, Battle of the Choirs Judges	Sydney Youth Orchestra, Australian Girls Choir, The Salvation Army Choir, Jubilation Gospel Group	Jamie Rigg	
19 December 2009	Seven Network	Kate Ritchie and Grant Denyer	The Wiggles, Justine Clarke, Adam Brand, The McClymonts, Georgie Parker, Mark Vincent, cast of Wicked the Musical, Kasey Chambers, Poppa Bill and The Little Hillbillies, Katherine Jenkins, Kate Ceberano, Ronan Keating, Leo Sayer, Engelbert Humperdinck	Sydney Youth Orchestra, Australian Girls Choir, The Salvation Army Choir, Sydney Childrens Choir, Gondwana National Indigenous Children's Choir	Graeme Press	
18 December 2010	Seven Network	Grant Denyer and Kylie Gillies	Janice Breen Showgroup, Georgie Parker, Mark Vincent, Felicity Urquhart, Greta Bradman, Charli Robinson, Jersey Boys, Troy Cassar-Daley, Straalen McCallum, Josh Groban, Stan Walker, Justice Crew, Cassie Davis, Tap Dogs, The Wiggles	Sydney Youth Orchestra, Australian Girls Choir	Graeme Press	
17 December 2011	Seven Network	Grant Denyer and Natalie Barr	Paulini, Amelia Farrugia, Cosentino, Judith Durham, The Fairies, Brian McFadden, Melinda Schneider, Georgie Parker, Todd McKenney, Danielle Spencer, Shannon Noll, Toybox, Damien Leith, Hugh Sheridan, David Campbell, Mark Vincent, Jack Vidgen, Tania Doko, Jay Laga'aia, Justice Crew, Michael Bublé, Justine Clarke, The cast of Annie, Katie Noonan & Elixir, Chloe Dallimore	Sydney Youth Orchestra, Australian Girls Choir, Jubilation Gospel Group, The Salvation Army Choir, Sydney Children's Choir	Graeme Press	
22 December 2012	Seven Network	Matt White and Natalie Barr	Sid & Scrat, Georgie Parker, Mark Vincent, Jay Laga'aia, Samantha Jade, The Collective, Rachael Beck, cast of Legally Blonde the Musical, The Wiggles, Jessica Mauboy, Ali McGregor, John Waters, The Ten Tenors, Doug Parkinson, Troy Cassar-Daley, Justice Crew, Johnny Ruffo, Rod Stewart, Emma Birdsall	Australian Girls Choir, The Salvation Army Choir, Sydney Youth Orchestra	Graeme Press	
21 December 2013	Seven Network	Matt White and Melissa Doyle	Tina Arena, Jimmy Barnes, The Wiggles, Jessica Mauboy, Human Nature, Samantha Jade, Johnny Ruffo, Stan Walker, Dami Im, Jai Waetford, Mark Vincent, Amanda Harrison, Justine Clarke, Tre-Belle Pop-Opera Trio,cast of Grease the Musical, cast of Strictly Ballroom the Musical, cast of Angelina Ballerina the Mousical, Kelly Clarkson NOTE: The first year for Simon Pryce, filling in for Murray Cook as a red wiggle after his retirement.	Sydney Youth Orchestra, Australian Girls Choir, Jubilation Gospel Group, The Salvation Army Choir	Graeme Press	
20 December 2014	Seven Network	David Koch, Samantha Armytage, Mark Beretta and Natalie Barr	Samantha Jade, Dami Im, Mark Vincent, Taylor Henderson, Lee Kernaghan, The McClymonts, Adam Garcia, Judith Durham, cast of Wicked the Musical, The Wiggles, Jay Laga'aia, Georgie Parker, Marlisa, Nathaniel Willemse, Paulini, Christine Anu, Doug Parkinson	The Salvation Army Choir, Australian Girls Choir, Jubilation Gospel Group	Graeme Press	
19 December 2015	Seven Network	David Koch, Samantha Armytage, Mark Beretta and Natalie Barr	Adam Brand, Cyrus Villanueva, Georgie Parker, Jay Laga'aia, Dami Im, Johnny Ruffo, Justice Crew, Justine Clarke, Ky Baldwin, Mickey Mouse and Minnie Mouse, Mark Vincent, Nathaniel Willemse, Samantha Jade, Swing on This, Teddy Tahu Rhodes, cast of The Sound of Music, The Wiggles	The Salvation Army Choir, Australian Girls Choir, Jubilation Gospel Group	Graeme Press	
18 December 2016	Seven Network	David Koch, Samantha Armytage, Mark Beretta and Natalie Barr	Jessica Mauboy, Dami Im, Paulini Curuenavuli, Harrison Craig, The Wiggles, Swing on This, John Paul Young, Leo Sayer, The McClymonts, Georgie Parker, Todd McKenney, Shannon Noll, Mickey and Minnie Mouse, Mark Vincent, Ky Baldwin, Jay Laga'aia and his 7/8 kids, Isaiah Firebrace, Natalie Ong, stars of Australian Opera	The Salvation Army Australia Choir, The Australian Girls Choir, Jubilation Gospel Group and dancers from the Janice Breen Performance Studio.	Graeme Press	
17 December 2017	Seven Network	David Koch, Samantha Armytage, Mark Beretta and Natalie Barr	Dami Im, Todd McKenney, Big T, stars of Australian Opera, Adam Harvey, Beccy Cole, Mickey Mouse, Jay Lag'aia and his 7/8 kids, Lucy Durack, Samantha Jade, Justice Crew, Penny McNamee, cast of The Wizard of Oz: The Musical, Jersey Boys, Michael Cormick, Justine Clarke, The Wiggles, CBD, Katie Noonan	The Salvation Army Australia Choir, The Australian Girls Choir, Jubilation Gospel Group and dancers from the Janice Breen Performance Studio.	Graeme Press	
22 December 2018	Seven Network	David Koch, Samantha Armytage, Mark Beretta and Natalie Barr	The Wiggles, Penny McNamee, Jack Jones, Rachael Beck, Ashleigh Rubenach, the leads from Muriel's Wedding the Musical-Natalie Abbott and Elizabeth Esguerra, Troy Cassar-Daley, Mickey Mouse, Todd McKenney, cast of Charlie and the Chocolate Factory the Musical, Ross Wilson, Thirsty Merc, Paulini, Isaiah Firebrace, Matt Lee, The Tap Pack, Mark Vincent, Samantha Jade, stars of Australian Opera	The Salvation Army Australia Choir, The Australian Girls Choir, Jubilation Gospel Group and dancers from the Janice Breen Performance Studio, the Sydney youth orchestra	Graeme Press	
21 December 2019	Seven Network	David Koch and Natalie Barr	Paulini, Penny McNamee, Vanessa Amorosi, Shannon Noll, Adam Brand, Lucy Durack, Harrison Craig, Todd McKenney, Mark Vincent, Mirusia Louwerse, The Wiggles, Mickey Mouse, Ashleigh Rubenach, Olina Loau, Jay Laga’aia and family, Hans the German	The Salvation Army Australia Choir, The Australian Girls Choir, The Sydney Male Choir, the Sydney Youth Orchestra and dancers from the Janice Breen Performance Studio & ED5 International	Graeme Press	
23 December 2020	Seven Network	Larry Emdur and Kylie Gillies	Hugh Sheridan, Penny McNamee, Todd McKenney, Shannon Noll, Leo Sayer, Rachael Beck, Mark Vincent, Amber Lawrence, Stephen Madsen, Ashleigh Rubenach, The Wiggles, The Tap Pack, Samantha Jade, Drummer Queens, the cast of Frozen the Musical, Mickey and Minnie Mouse, Annie Jones, Robbie Williams	The Sydney Youth Orchestra, The Salvation Army Choir, dancers from Janice Breen Performance Studio & ED5 International, The Australian Girls Choir	Graeme Press	
18 December 2021	Seven Network	David Koch and Natalie Barr	Carrie Underwood, Mark Vincent, Phil Burton, Penny McNamee, Stefanie Caccamo, Violeta Bozanic, Big T, The Wiggles, Isaiah Firebrace, Samantha Jade, Jordan and Sian Fuller, Bella Taylor Smith, Jay Laga’aia, Melinda Schneider, Paulini, Mickey Mouse and Minnie Mouse, Young Stars of Australian Opera,	The Sydney Youth Orchestra, The Salvation Army Choir, dancers from Janice Breen Performance Studio & Brent Street, The Australian Girls Choir	Graeme Press	
17 December 2022	Seven Network	David Koch and Natalie Barr	Andrea Bocelli, Mark Vincent, Phil Burton, Chloe Zuel, Rachael Beck, the Leads from Moulin Rouge! The Musical- Alinta Chidzey and Des Flanagan, Leo Sayer, Rhonda Burchmore, The Wiggles, Todd McKenney, Samantha Jade, Silvia Colloca, Lachie Gill, Paulini, Hugh Sheridan, the cast of Cinderella the Musical, Tom Burlinson, Mickey Mouse and Minnie Mouse, Young Stars of Australian Opera	The Sydney Youth Orchestra, The Salvation Army Choir, dancers from Janice Breen Performance Studio & ED5 International, The Australian Girls Choir, Rejoice Gospel Choir	Graeme Press	
16 December 2023	Seven Network	Matt Shirvington and Natalie Barr	Dami Im, Casey Donovan, Rhonda Burchmore, Erin Holland, Jonathan Antoine, Silvia Colloca, Tarryn Stokes, Blake Bowden, Matt Lee, Ben Mingay, Paulini, Shubshri Kandiah, Lucy Durack, David Berry, Big T, Mahalia Barnes, The Wiggles, cast of Tina: The Tina Turner Musical, Young Stars of Australian Opera		Chong Lim	
21 December 2024	Seven Network	Matt Shirvington and Natalie Barr	Mark Vincent, The Wiggles, Samantha Jade, Erin Holland, Conrad Sewell, Jael Wena, Hugh Sheridan, Kym Johnson-Herjavec, Budjerah, Rhonda Burchmore, Silvia Colloca, Patrick Roberts, Christine Anu, Amy Manford, Reuben De Melo, Chloe Zuel, Jarrod Draper		Chong Lim	
20 December 2025	Seven Network	Matt Shirvington and Natalie Barr	Marcia Hines, The Wiggles, Kate Miller-Heidke, Leo Sayer, James Johnston, Hugh Sheridan, Kym Johnson-Herjavec, Budjerah, Marshall Hamburger, Erin Holland, Mark Vincent, Patrick Roberts, Jael Wena, Alyssa Delpopolo, Jaedyn Randell, Layla Schillert, Jayme-Lee Hanekom, Stitch, The Cast From Back to the Future: The Musical featuring- Axel Duffy, Ashleigh Rubenach and Javon King	The Dancers from Janice Breen Performance Studio and ED5 International, The Australian Girls Choir, Rejoice Gospel Choir, Sydney Youth Orchestra, The Salvation Amy Choir and The Carols in the Domain Choir	Chong Lim	
19 December 2026	Nine Network	Allison Langdon and James Bracey	The Wiggles, Mark Vincent, Kaylee Bell, Kym Johnson-Herjavec, Budjerah, Charli Robinson, Sam McClymont, Silvia Colloca, Hugh Sheridan, Dami Im, Samantha Jade, Jude York, Brooke McClymont and Adam Eckersley			

== See also ==
- Carols by Candlelight, a similar event in Melbourne.
- Christian music in Australia
