= Christopher Horsey =

Australian entertainer (born 1972)

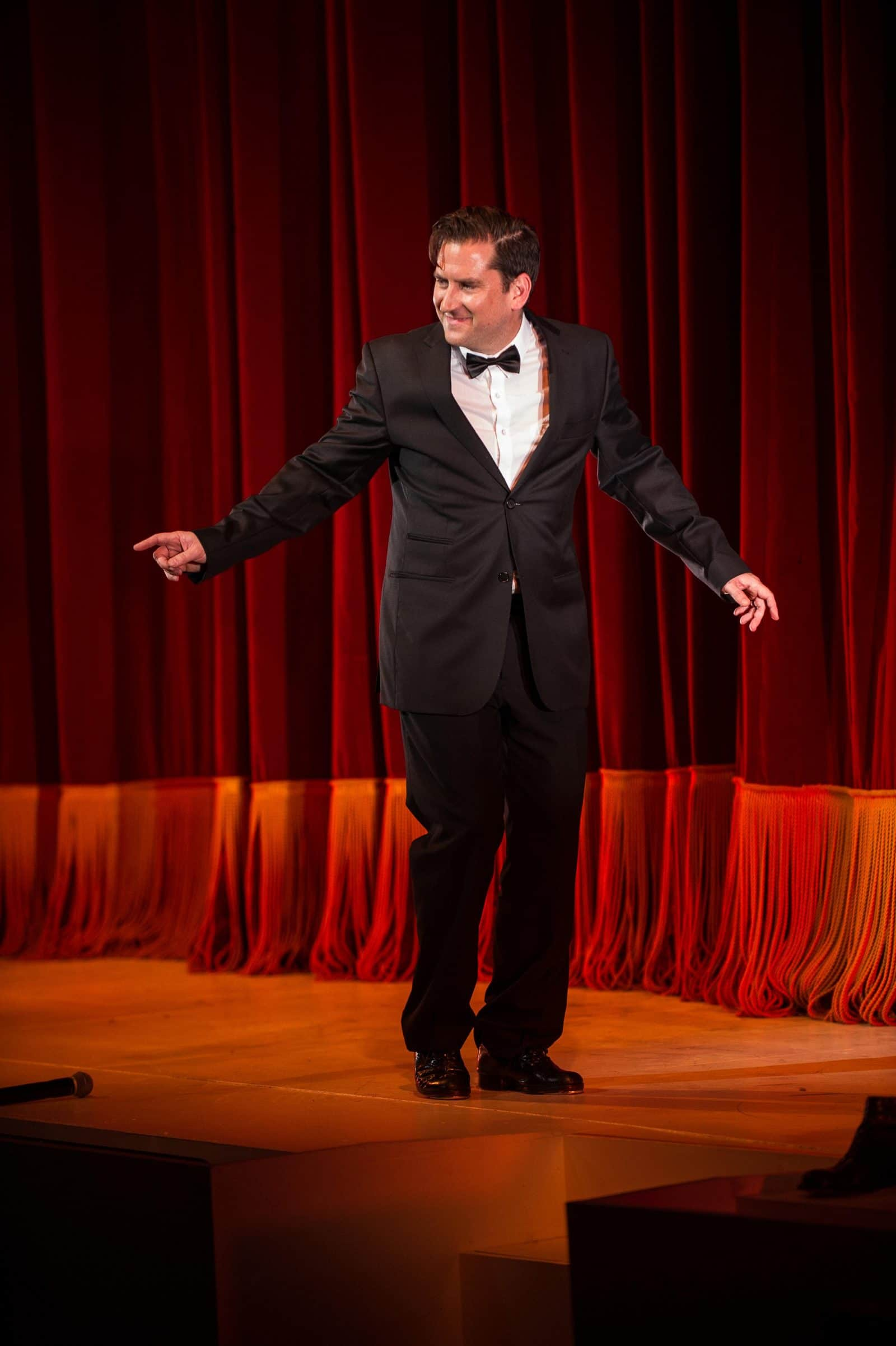
- Horsey in September 2018
- Born: !-- only use if different from name above --> 11 July 1972 (age 54); Gold Coast, Queensland, Australia
- Occupations: Director, Choreographer, performer, teacher
- Years active: 1988–present
- Spouse: Lucy Durack (m. 2014)
- Children: 2

Christopher Horsey (born 11 July 1972) is an Australian entertainer, director, choreographer and performing arts teacher.

== Early life ==
Horsey learnt to perform, teach and choreograph from his mother, Kay Horsey, who had a dance school for 26 years on the Gold Coast.

Horsey began his tap dancing career as a pre-teen in 1984 by finishing in first place in the age 9 to 12 category of the Fred Astaire International Tap and Jazz Championship at the Waldorf Astoria Hotel in New York City. At age 13 he appeared on the Australia television show Young Talent Time as their "Talent Discovery of the Week". At age 16 he performed in the "Ultimate Event" Frank Sinatra concert at Sanctuary Cove, Australia.

== Career ==
=== Performer ===
Horsey has performed onstage since 1989 in productions including 42nd Street (original Australian cast), Funny Girl, West Side Story, Chicago and Singin' in the Rain.

Horsey rose to fame in the early 1990s as an original cast member of Hot Shoe Shuffle, "The first Australian musical with an all-Australian cast to make it to the West End", in which he originated the role of "Tip", touring Australia, New Zealand, Japan and the Queens Theatre in London. He continued working with Dein Perry, joining Tap Dogs on their North American tour which included six months at the Off-Broadway Union Square Theatre.

In 2000, he played the role of Angus in the Fox Searchlight Pictures film Bootmen alongside his friend and collaborator Adam Garcia, as well as Sam Worthington.

In 2007, Horsey portrayed Andy Lee in a limited showing of 42nd Street in Melbourne. In 2009, he played Lank Hawkins in Crazy For You.

In 2014, he plays the role of Benny Southstreet in Guys and Dolls and that same year he played conman Rooster in Annie.

Horsey has appeared in the independently produced Every Single Saturday at Glen Street Theatre and both choreographed and performed in Lifeforce, both written by Joanna Weinberg. In 2014, Horsey joined the cast of The Tap Pack for their Sydney season at the recently established Hayes Theatre in Potts Point and continued a small tour with the show until its debut in the Dunstan Playhouse at the Adelaide Cabaret Festival in 2015.

Horsey originated the role of Officer Peter Hammett and choreographed the New Musicals Australia production of The Detective's Handbook at the Hayes Theatre, directed by Jonathan Biggins.

Horsey has featured in five 'Neglected Musicals' shows, Girl Crazy, My Favorite Year, Seesaw, Nick & Nora and Lucky Stiff. Neglected Musicals are presented with scripts in hand, and with piano accompaniment after only a day's rehearsal.

Horsey presented Arts Friday on Eastside Radio for 5 years

==== Performances ====
- 42nd Street Ensemble
- Hot Shoe Shuffle as 'Tip' (originated)
- West Side Story as 'Big Deal'
- Tap Dogs as '2IC'
- Chicago as 'Harry'/'The Jury'
- Singin' in the Rain as 'Sid Phillips' and first cover for 'Cosmo Brown'
- 42nd Street as 'Andy Lee'
- Crazy For You as 'Lank Hawkins'
- Guys and Dolls as 'Benny Southstreet'
- The Tap Pack as 'Marty'
- Kiss Me, Kate as 'Paul'
- The Detective's Handbook as 'Officer Peter Hammett' (originated)

=== Director/Choreographer ===
Horsey is a 2017 Australian Dance Awards nominee in the 'Outstanding Achievement in Commercial Dance, Musicals or Physical Theatre' category, for his work on Swing on This, a show he has been directing and choreographing since its international debut at the 2014 Adelaide Cabaret Festival. The show stars Matt Lee, Ben Mingay, Luke Kennedy, Rob Mills and Michael Falzon. Swing on This is a collection of classic swing songs reworked with a more contemporary style, as well as more recent popular music arranged for an 18 piece big band.

Horsey was both choreographer and Resident Director for the 2016 Opera Queensland production of Kiss Me, Kate.

Horsey choreographed a new cabaret-style show, Everybody Loves Lucy, starring Elise McCann and choreographed Ruthless! at The Seymour Centre starring Katrina Retallick, Geraldine Turner, Margi De Feranti and Merideth O'Reilly on which he was also Resident Director.

In 2012, Horsey choreographed the opening sequence of the Helpmann Awards at the Sydney Opera House featuring host Simon Burke and Genevieve Lemon, Trevor Ashley, Peter Carroll and corps de ballet dancer Montana Rubin from The Australian Ballet.

Horsey performed in and choreographed Adam Garcia's 2010 and 2011 judges performance on Got To Dance, a British dance competition that was broadcast on Sky 1 in the United Kingdom and Ireland. Horsey was commissioned by Northern Tap Company to create and choreograph a brand new Tap Dance show which he called Soundz Extraordinary for a one night only showing at The Civic Theatre in Barnsley (United Kingdom) on 24 September 2011.

Horsey choreographed 'Mickey's Christmas Big Band' show at Disneyland Paris and is resident choreographer for Carols in the Domain, broadcast on the Seven Network.

Date	Show	Venue	Date	Show	Venue
2018 (27 Aug)	Dance Boss	Network Seven	2018 (10–11 July)	The InBESTigators	Gristmill (ABC/TV)
2018 (29–30 June)	A Night at the Speakeasy	Concert Hall, Opera House	2018 (15–17 Mar)	Godspell	Eternity Playhouse, Sydney
2018 (10 Mar)	Swing on This	Concert Hall, Opera House	2018 (7–19 Mar)	Godspell	Chapel Off Chapel, Melb
2018 (24 Feb – 8 Mar)	The 39 Steps	Cremorne Theatre, QPAC	2018 (14 Feb)	Witches	Joondalup Resort
2017 (17 Dec)	Carols in the Domain	Network Seven	2017 (Oct–Dec)	Mickey's Christmas Big Band	Disneyland Paris
2017 (25 July – 5 Aug)	West Side Story	Conservatorium Theatre, Bris	2017 (6–7 July)	George Michael, Praying For Time	Concert Hall, Opera House
2017 (16–17 June)	Swing on This	Perth Concert Hall	2017 (7 Jan)	Swing on This	Concert Hall, QPAC
2016 (18 Dec)	Carols in the Domain	Network Seven	2016 (14 Nov)	Rob Guest Endowment	Lyric Theatre, Sydney
2016 (12 Nov)	Kiss Me, Kate	Concert Hall, QPAC	2016 (19 June)	Swing on This	Theatre Royal, Sydney
2016 (21 Apr – 7 May)	The Detective's Handbook	Hayes Theatre, Sydney	2015 (10 Nov)	Rob Guest Endowment	The Capitol Theatre, Sydney
2015 (4–6 May)	The Bugalugs Bum Thief	Riverside Theatre, Parramatta	2015 (29 April – 2 May)	The Bugalugs Bum Thief	Glen Street Theatre
2015 (16–24 April)	The Bugalugs Bum Thief	Darling Quarter Theatre, Darling Harbour, Sydney	2015 (16 Feb)	Swing on This	Arts Centre, Gold Coast
2014 (4–6 June)	Everybody Loves Lucy	Hayes Theatre	2014 (12 Oct)	Iconic A Cappella at the House	The Studio, Sydney Opera House

=== Performing Arts Teacher ===
Horsey teaches drama, musical theatre and tap dance.

He has taught and lectured at Queensland Conservatorium Griffith University, Sydney Dance Company, Academy of Music & Performing Arts (AMPA), Victorian College of the Arts (VCA), Excelsia College (formerly Wesley Institute), ED5 International and Brent Street School of Performing Arts.

== Awards ==
First Place – Fred Astaire International Tap & Jazz Championship 1984

People's Choice Award, Short Sweet & Dance Festival 2007 for his Seinfeld inspired Tap show 3 Hits and a Miss

Australian Dance Awards nominee in the 'Outstanding Achievement in Commercial Dance, Musicals or Physical Theatre' category, for his work on Swing on This 2017

== Filmography ==
Year	Title	Role	Director
2005	The Adventures of Roman Pilgrim	Roman Pilgrim	Anny Slater
2001	Changi (miniseries)	Shadow Dancer	Kate Woods
2000	Bootmen	Angus	Dein Perry

== Personal life ==
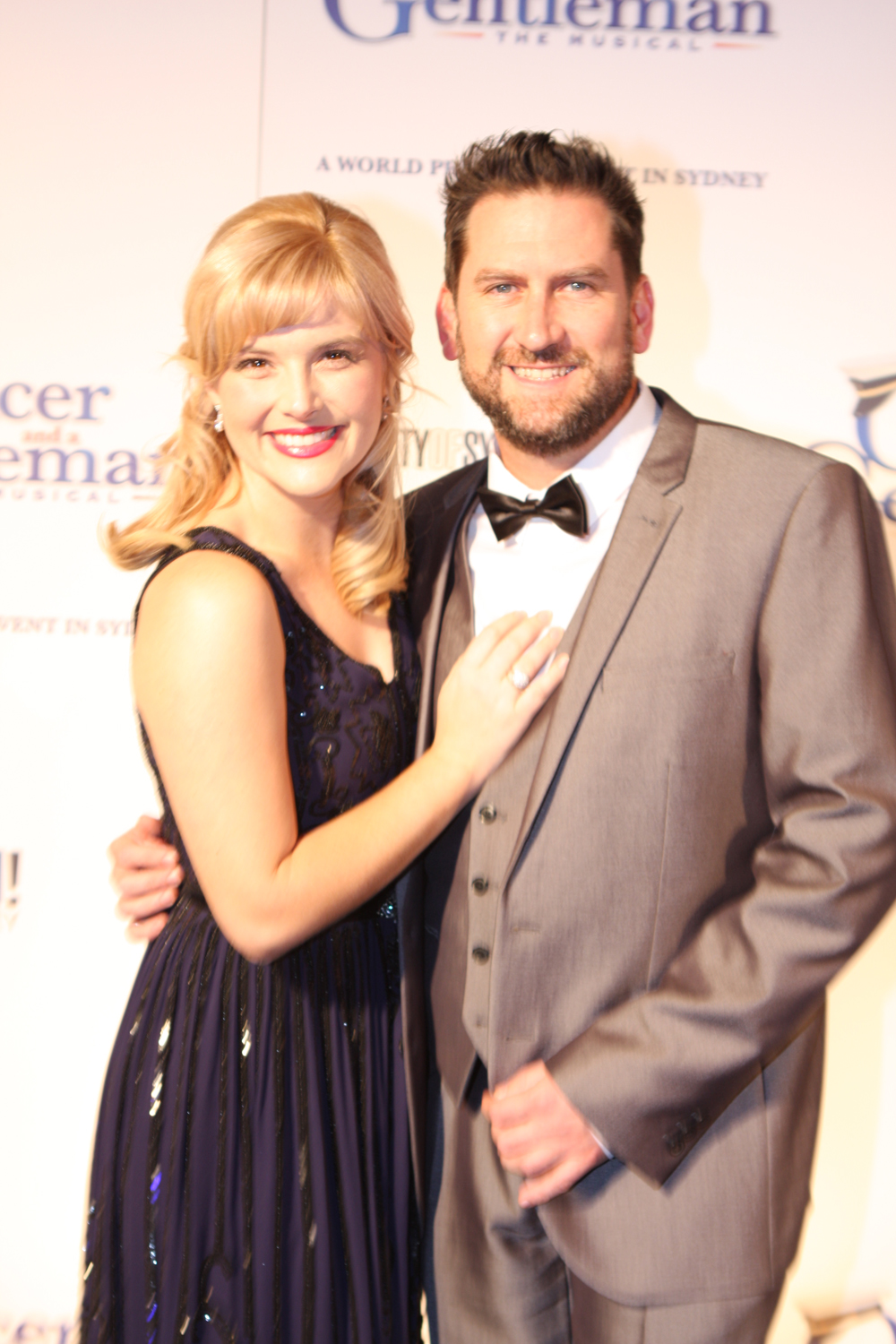
Horsey with wife Lucy Durack

Horsey married Australian film, TV and stage actress Lucy Durack on Rottnest Island off the coast of Perth, Western Australia on 5 April 2014. They have a daughter, Polly Gladys and son Theodore Lindsay.
