= Packemin Productions =

Packemin Productions is a theatre company based in Western Sydney, Australia. The company was formed in 2010 to produce Pro-Am musical theatre in association with Riverside Theatres Parramatta.

== Productions ==
- Joseph and the Amazing Technicolor Dreamcoat 11–26 February 2011. Starring Andrew Conaghan as Joseph, Barry Crocker as Jacob and Mick Gerace as Pharaoh.
- Oliver! 3–18 February 2012. Starring Damian Hempstead as Oliver, Wayne Scott Kermond as Fagin, Katie McKee as Nancy and Todd Keys as Bill Sikes.
- The Wizard of Oz 8–23 February 2013. Starring Jimmy Rees as The Scarecrow, Laura Murphy as Dorothy, Adam Scicluna as The Lion and Luke Joslin as The Tinman.
- Hairspray 26 July–10 August 2013. Starring Jon English as Edna Turnblad, Wayne Scott Kermond as Wilbur Turnblad, Jessica Rookeward as Tracy Turnblad and Cle Morgan as Motormouth Maybelle.
- Annie 7–22 February 2014. Starring Stella Barahona & Isabella Taylor as Annie, Amanda Muggleton as Miss Hannigan, Rodney Dobson as Oliver "Daddy" Warbucks and Christopher Horsey as Rooster.
- Beauty and the Beast 18 July–2 August 2014. Starring Kelsi Boyden as Belle, Scott Irwin as The Beast, Donna Lee as Mrs Potts and Adam Scicluna as Cogsworth.
- The Phantom of the Opera 6–21 February 2015. Starring Ben Mingay as The Phantom, Erin Clare as Christine, Joshua Keane as Raoul and Johanna Allen as Carlotta.
- Mary Poppins 24 July–8 August 2015. Starring Penny McNamee as Mary Poppins, Shaun Rennie as Bert, Sam Moran as George Banks and Kate Maree Hoolihan as Winifred Banks.
- West Side Story 5–20 February 2016. Starring Louis Lucente as Tony, Elisa Colla as Maria and Rowena Vilar as Anita.
- Wicked 29 July–13 August 2016. Starring Ashleigh Taylor as Elphaba, Mikayla Williams as Glinda and Wayne Scott Kermond as The Wizard.
- Miss Saigon 28 July–12 August 2017. Starring Vivien Emsworth as Kim, Marcus Rivera as The Engineer, Haydan Hawkins as Chris, Kyle Sapsford as John and Ashleigh Taylor as Ellen.
- Shrek The Musical 2–17 February 2018. Starring Jay Laga'aia as Shrek, Luke Joslin as Lord Farquaad, Mikayla Williams as Princess Fiona and Nat Jobe as Donkey.
- Legally Blonde 27 July–11 August. Starring Mikayla Williams as Elle Woods, Kyle Sapsford as Emmett, Joshua Keane as Warner, Jocelyn O'Brien as Paulette and Rodney Dobson as Professor Callahan.
- Jesus Christ Superstar 8–23 February 2019, Starring Joe Kalou as Jesus, Toby Francis as Judas, Brittanie Shipway as Mary and Gavin Brightwell as Pontius Pilate.
- Mamma Mia! 2–17 August 2019, and 11-26 February 2022. Starring Louise Butler as Donna, Courtney Bell as Sophie, Scott Irwin as Sam and Debora Krizak as Tanya.
- Les Misérables 14–29 February 2020, and 28 July-12 August 2023. Starring Daniel Belle as Jean Valjean, Robert McDougall as Javert, Georgia Burley as Cosette and Brenton Bell as Marius Pontmercy.
- We Will Rock You 12–27 February 2021. Starring Toby Francis as Galileo, Debora Krizak as Killer Queen and Wayne Scott Kermond as Buddy.
- Kinky Boots 9–24 September 2022. Starring Adam Rennie as Charlie Price, Nat Jobe as Lola/Simon and Laura Garrick as Lauren.
- Les Misérables 28 July-12 August 2023. Starring Daniel Belle as Jean Valjean, Robert McDougall as Javert, Courtney Emmas as Fantine, Daniella Delfin as Eponine, Georgia Burley as Cosette and Brenton Bell as Marius Pontmercy, Tom Kelly as Enjolras.

== Packemin Youth Productions ==
Packemin Youth Productions have presented three shows at The Concourse, Chatswood.

- Joseph and the Amazing Technicolor Dreamcoat 9–24 January 2015. Starring Sam Moran as Jacob
- Back to the 80s 8–23 January 2016. Starring Mark Simpson as Mr Cocker
- Cats 13–28 January 2017. Starring Simon Pryce as Old Deuteronomy / Bustopher Jones
