= Bootmen =

- Theatrical release poster
- Directed by: Dein Perry
- Written by: Steve Worland; Hilary Linstead; Dein Perry
- Produced by: Hilary Linstead; Antonia Barnard
- Starring: Adam Garcia; Sophie Lee; Sam Worthington
- Cinematography: Steve Mason
- Edited by: Jane Moran
- Music by: Cezary Skubiszewski
- Distributed by: Fox Searchlight Pictures
- Release dates: 5 October 2000 (Australia); 6 October 2000 (United States)
- Running time: 92 minutes
- Countries: Australia; United States
- Language: English
- Box office: $2.7 million

Bootmen, known as Tap Dogs in Japan, is a 2000 Australian romantic comedy film directed by Dein Perry. It stars Adam Garcia, Sophie Lee, and Sam Worthington in his film debut.

== Plot ==
Sean and Mitchell are young adult brothers, having grown up in the rugged Australian steel city town of Newcastle. The father is a tough coal miner and they have no mother. Mitchell is a small-time criminal, while Sean dreams of being a professional dancer. Their father does not approve of Sean's dancing, so he hides his passion. Sean meets local hairdresser Linda at a dance class and falls in love with her. Things look promising between them, but Sean leaves to make his mark. Mitchell confesses his love for her and she thinks Sean has left, so they end up getting drunk together and having a one-night stand.

Meanwhile, Sean gets a role as a dancer in a show. The star's girlfriend flirts with him and the star gives Sean a difficult time, culminating with Sean outdancing him. They get into a shouting match. Sean punches the star and is fired.

Sean returns to Newcastle and tries to pick up where he left off with Linda, only to be told that she is pregnant with Mitchell's child. He breaks ties with both Linda and Mitchell, creates his own dance troupe and plans to show the people of Newcastle what they can do. Their father's work is closing, and the workers need money to retrain so Sean plans a benefit show.

Mitchell gets in trouble with local thugs and escapes on his motorbike. They later catch him in a warehouse and he plunges to his death. The police immediately charge the culprit. Sean, depressed over the death of his brother and that he was unforgiving, thinks about quitting until he finds a tool that Mitchell designed, solving a technical problem with the show. Realizing that his brother believes in him, Sean is determined to honor his memory. The show goes on.

They charge $10 a head and estimate 5,000 patrons will attend the event, even Sean's proud Dad who now accepts his son as a dancer and tells Sean even his mother would be happy. Sean realises his dream of being a respected dancer, reconciles with Linda and pledges to help take care of his brother's child.

== Cast ==
- Adam Garcia as Sean Okden
- Sophie Lee as Linda
- Sam Worthington as Mitchell Okden
- Richard Carter as Gary Okden
- Andrew Kaluski as Colin
- Christopher Horsey as Angus
- Lee McDonald as Derrick
- Matt Lee as Johnno
- William Zappa as Walter
- Susie Porter as Sara
- Anthony Hayes as Huey
- Justine Clarke as Kim
- Grant Walmsley
- Andrew Doyle
- Bruce Venables
- Tony Butterfield
- Craig Anderson

== Production ==
The film was funded by the Australian Film Finance Corporation. Production took place from 19 June to 18 August 1999 in Sydney and Newcastle. It was shot by cinematographer Steve Mason.

It was the debut film of Dein Perry, who was previously involved with stage shows such as Tap Dogs and Steel City.

== Release ==
The film was distributed by Fox Searchlight Pictures, and was released in Australia on 5 October 2000 and

It is also known as Tap Dogs in Japan.

== Awards and nominations ==
=== Awards won ===
- Australian Cinematographers Society (2001):
  - Award of Distinction (awarded to Feature Productions Cinema – Steve Mason)
- Australian Film Institute (AFI) (2000):
  - Best Achievement in Cinematography: Steve Mason
  - Best Achievement in Costume Design: Tess Schofield
  - Best Achievement in Production Design: Murray Picknett
  - Best Achievement in Sound: David Lee, Laurence Maddy, Andrew Plain, Ian McLoughlin
  - Best Original Music Score: Cezary Skubiszewski
- Film Critics Circle of Australia Awards (FCCA) (2001):
  - Best Cinematography: Steve Mason
  - Best Editing: Jane Moran
  - Best Music Score: Cezary Skubiszewski (tied with Edmund Choi for The Dish (2000)).

=== Award nominations ===
- Australian Film Institute (AFI) (2000):
  - Best Achievement in Editing: Jane Moran
  - Best Film: Hilary Linstead
  - Best Performance by an Actor in a Leading Role: Sam Worthington

== DVD release ==
The film was released on home video on 27 February 2001 by 20th Century Fox Home Entertainment.

== Soundtrack ==
The Bootmen Soundtrack was released by RCA Victor in 2000 and composed by Cezary Skubiszewski and other various artists.

1. Rumble – You Am I
2. Opening Sequence – Cezary Skubiszewski
3. Strange Human Beings – Regurgitator
4. Tease Me – Paul Kelly
5. My Family – Banana Oil
6. Sign Post – Grinspoon
7. Love Theme – Cezary Skubiszewski
8. Radio Loves This – Deborah Conway
9. Hit Song – Custard
10. Giveway – Supaskuba
11. Better Off Dead – Grinspoon
12. Don't It Get You Down – Deadstar
13. Nothing on My Mind – Paul Kelly
14. Nipple – Icecream Hands
15. Deeper Water – Deadstar
16. Finale Part 2 – Cezary Skubiszewski
17. Shiver – Oblivia
18. "Even When I'm Sleeping" – Leonardo's Bride
19. Junk – You Am I
20. Tap Forge – Dein Perry

== Reception ==
=== Box office ===
Bootmen grossed $2,720,302 at the box office in Australia.

=== Critical reception ===
On review aggregator Rotten Tomatoes, the film holds an approval rating of 39% based on 17 reviews, and an average rating of 4.90/10. On Metacritic, the film has a weighted average score of 45 out of 100, based on 14 critics.

== See also ==
- Cinema of Australia
