= Perth Symphony Orchestra =

Symphony orchestra from Perth, Western Australia

- Short name: PSO
- Founded: November 2011
- Location: Perth, Western Australia
- Website: perthsymphony.com
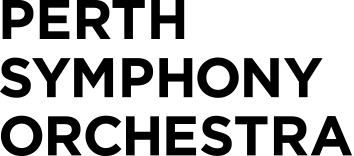

The Perth Symphony Orchestra (PSO), or simply Perth Symphony, is a not-for-profit professional symphony orchestra based in Perth, Western Australia. The orchestra aims to broaden access to classical music by performing in places and spaces not naturally associated with the genre (such as sheds, warehouses and aeroplane hangars).

Since 2011 over 350,000 people have attended a Perth Symphony concert.

== History ==
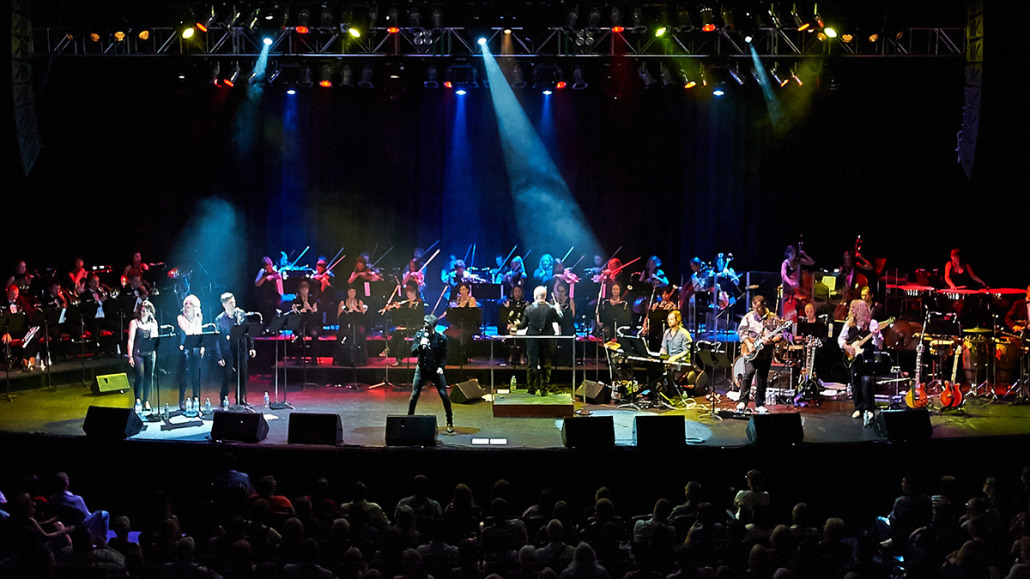
Perth Symphony Orchestra performs the music of Queen

The Perth Symphony Orchestra was founded in November 2011 at an inaugural concert hosted by the University Club of WA, part of the University of Western Australia. The orchestra has rehearsed at Scotch College since 2012. The following year, Perth Symphony expanded to include the Perth Chamber Orchestra and Perth Symphony Voices.

In 2014, Perth Symphony launched the Perth Symphony Big Band which performed the show Swing on This to launch the Bunbury Regional Entertainment Centre in the south-west of Western Australia and the Perth Symphony Touring Ensemble.

== Musicians ==
Membership to the Perth Symphony is by invitation. Players are freelance musicians and younger performers from institutions such as the Western Australian Academy of Performing Arts and the University of Western Australia.

== See also ==
- West Australian Symphony Orchestra
