= Garcia v National Australia Bank Ltd =

Judgement of the High Court of Australia

- Court: High Court of Australia
- Decided: 6 August 1998
- Citations: [1998] HCA 48, (1998) 194 CLR 395
- Transcripts: [1997] HCATrans 48 (13 February 1997) [1998] HCATrans 50 (4 March 1998)

Case history
- Prior actions: Garcia v National Australia Bank Ltd (1993) 5 BPR 11,996, Supreme Court (NSW); National Australia Bank Ltd v Garcia [1996] NSWSC 253, (1996) 39 NSWLR 577, Court of Appeal (NSW)

Court membership
- Judges sitting: Gaudron, McHugh, Gummow, Kirby, Hayne, & Callinan JJ

Garcia v National Australia Bank Ltd, was an important case decided in the High Court of Australia on 6 August 1998. The case determined the circumstances under which it is unconscionable for a lender to enforce a transaction against a wife. It is considered a very important case in Australian equity, as it continues to be the leading case in spouse-surety cases.

== Facts and Judicial History ==
In 1979, Jean Balharry Garcia and her then husband, Fabio Garcia, executed a mortgage over their jointly owned matrimonial home in favour of National Australia Bank. Between 1979 and 1987, Jean Balharry Garcia also signed several guarantees. These documents were signed to secure a loan that was made to Fabio Garcia for use in his company, Citizens Gold Bullion Exchange Pty Limited. The couple separated in 1988, and in the following year, Fabio Garcia's company wound up.

In 1990, Jean Balharry Garcia commenced proceedings in the Supreme Court of New South Wales seeking declarations that the various documents were of no force or effect, and void. The trial judge, Young J, applied the rule in Yerkey v Jones, and granted a declaration that none of the guarantees which the appellant had given bound her.

On appeal, the New South Wales Court of Appeal, Mahoney P, Meagher and Sheller JJA, held that the rule in Yerkey v Jones, should no longer be applied as it had been overruled by Commercial Bank of Australia Ltd v Amadio.

The appellant was granted leave to appeal to the High Court of Australia.

== Judgment ==
By a majority of five to one, the High Court (Gaudron, McHugh, Gummow, Hayne and Callinan JJ) declined to adopt the approach taken by Lord Browne-Wilkinson in Barclays Bank plc v O'Brien, and instead, held that the rule in Yerkey v Jones, still applied in Australia. Kirby J in his dissenting judgement argued that the approach taken in Yerkey v Jones should be rejected. However, the High Court was unanimous in overturning the decision of the Court of Appeal in favour of reinstating the trial judge's orders.

The High Court also held that the law of unconscionability as established in Commercial Bank of Australia Ltd v Amadio, did not cover the rule in Yerkey v Jones, and instead, both of these cases were considered as distinct doctrines.
