= Mister Eleven =

- Logo
- Written by: Amanda Coe
- Directed by: Paul Gay
- Starring: Michelle Ryan; Sean Maguire; Adam Garcia; Lynda Bellingham; Olivia Colman; Denis Lawson
- Country of origin: United Kingdom
- Original language: English
- No. of episodes: 2

Production
- Executive producers: Greg Brenman; Richard Fell
- Producer: Nicola Larder
- Running time: 44 minutes
- Production company: Tiger Aspect Productions

Original release
- Network: ITV
- Release: 11 December – 18 December 2009

Mister Eleven is a 2009 two-part British romantic drama television miniseries starring Michelle Ryan and Sean Maguire. It also stars Adam Garcia, Lynda Bellingham, Olivia Colman and Denis Lawson. It is written by Shameless writer Amanda Coe.

Mister Eleven was released on DVD on 1 February 2010 by IMC Vision.

== Cast ==
- Michelle Ryan - Saz Paley, a new wife who cheats on her husband after reading that the happiest brides marry their eleventh sexual partner
- Sean Maguire - Dan Paley, Saz's new husband and "Mister Ten", who takes Saz back at the end of the miniseries
- Adam Garcia - Alex, Saz' "Mister Eleven"
- Denis Lawson - Len
- Lynda Bellingham - Shirley
- Olivia Colman - Beth
- Jocelyn Osorio - Alicia
- Sarah Niles - Audrey
- Nitzan Sharron - Omar
- Preeya Kalidas - Leanne
- Nicholas Burns - Eddie
- Adrianna Bertola - Young Saz
- Dev Patel - Waiter
- Eliza Elkington - Missy
- Norman Bowman - Rob
