= National Theatre of Parramatta =

Australian professional theatre company

The National Theatre of Parramatta is a professional theatre company based in Parramatta in Western Sydney, Australia. Launched in 2015, the company aims to reflect multicultural Australia on stage, with a particular focus on ethnic and socio-economic diversity.

It is resident at the Riverside Theatres Parramatta.
