= Fabio Garcia =

Colombian criminal

- Born: Fabio Benjamin Garcia; Calarcá, Quindio, Colombia
- Occupation: Convicted criminal
- Spouse: Jean Balharry Garcia
- Children: Adam Garcia
- Convictions: Conspiracy to import cocaine on a large scale Illegal money laundering

Fabio Benjamin Garcia is a Colombian former drug lord and prison breaker who specialized in the smuggling of cocaine from Colombia to the United States on a substantial scale. Garcia was one of the major figures in the cocaine trade and drug smuggling during the 1980s in the United States and South America. During his peak in the late 1980s, he was a part of two major drug cartels including Cali Cartel and Medellín Cartel, which were responsible for up to 90% of the cocaine smuggled into the United States. In 1989, Garcia and his partner Ian Hall Saxon were found guilty by High Court of Australia in the largest drug bust in the history of Australia.

== Life and criminal career ==
Garcia was born in Calarcá, Colombia, in 1939. He was married to Jean Balharry Garcia, a Sydney resident, in the early 1970s. Fabio separated with his wife in 1988.

Garcia joined Colombian illegal drug industry in 1981. He connected with his partner Ian Hall Saxon and started transporting cocaine to Florida under the guidance of Carlos Lehder, the founder of Medellín Cartel. After multiple illegal drugs transportation to the United States and Australia, Garcia and Hall were caught and arrested by New South Wales Police Force in 1988. He was indicted in six different drugs related criminal counts. In 1991, Garcia and his partner Hall were found guilty by High Court of Australia and were sent on remand to Long Bay Correctional Centre. The drug bust in which Garcia was arrested is still the largest drug bust in the history of Australia. In March 1993, Garcia and Hall staged one of the most famous prison breaks in the history of Australia and escaped from Long Bay to the United States. Garcia was eventually tracked down in California, in 1994 and extradited to Australia. Later that year, jury returned verdict of guilty for Garcia on all six counts and he was sentenced to 24 years imprisonment. Although, at that time, due to lack of evidence to prosecute the entire chain of Garcia's drug deals, he was released by higher court.

In 1979, Garcia and his wife, Jean, established a bullion trading company, Citizens Gold Bullion Exchange Pty Limited. Garcia's intention for the establishment of the company was illegal money laundering. The couple executed a mortgage over their family home in favor of National Australia Bank. Between 1979 and 1987, the couple signed several guarantees to secure a loan that was made to Fabio Garcia for use in his company. The company was declared insolvent in 1989 after which banks wanted to take their home against which loans were secured. On 6 August 1998, during Garcia v National Australia Bank Ltd trial, the judiciary granted a declaration that none of the guarantees which Garcia had given bound his ex-wife, Jean, which saved their home from acquisition. The case continues to be an important judgement in spouse-surety cases and has been cited later in multiple similar cases.

== See also ==
- Garcia v National Australia Bank Ltd
- Adam Garcia
