= Hot Shoe Shuffle =

Musical

- Book: Larry Buttrose; Kathryn Riding
- Basis: story by Max Lambert, David Atkins, Dein Perry
- Productions: 1992 Sydney; 1994 West End; 2002 Australia; 2013 Australia

Hot Shoe Shuffle is a 1992 Australian musical produced by David Atkins. A jukebox musical, the score mostly includes American big band and popular songs of the 1920s to 1940s. While set in the United States, the show has a decidedly Australian sense of humor.

The musical concerns seven Tap Brothers, Spring, Slap, Buck, Wing, Tip, Tap and Slide, who learn of the death of their long-absent father. Their father has left them a large inheritance, however to receive it they must rehearse and perform his legendary ‘Act’ – the Hot Shoe Shuffle. They must also include their long-lost sister, April, in the act. The original cast included David Atkins, Rhonda Burchmore, Christopher Horsey and Jack Webster.

It is one of the most popular Australian musicals of all time, being the first one to have a successful run on the West End. The West End production at the Queen's Theatre was nominated in 1995 for the Olivier Award for Best New Musical, and choreographers Atkins and Dein Perry won for Best Theatre Choreographer.

At the ARIA Music Awards of 1994, the cast recording won ARIA Award for Best Original Soundtrack, Cast or Show Album.

The show was partially rewritten for a revival in Houston in 1998.

== Track listing ==
1. "Overture / Telegram Song"
2. "I've Got to Be a Rugcutter"
3. "Where Was I When They Passed Out Luck"
4. "Long ago And Far Away"
5. "Ain't Misbehavin' / Handful of Keys / This Joint Is Jumpin'"
6. "Ac-Cent-Tchu-Ate the Positive"
7. "Fifteen Minute Intermission / Entr'Act"
8. "I Get Along Without You Very Well"
9. "Let's Call the Whole Thing Off"
10. "Shall We Dance"
11. "When I Get My Name In Lights / The Act / Hot Shoe Shuffle / Overture"
12. "Puttin' On the Ritz"
13. "How Lucky Can You Get"
14. "Song of Dance Man"
15. ""Big Band Tap Medley - Little Brown Jug / Pennsylvania 6-5000 / Mood Indigo / Tiger Rag"
16. "How Long Has This Been Going On"
17. "I've Got a Girl in Kalamazoo"
18. "It Don't Mean a Thing if It Ain't Got That Swing"
19. "It Don't Mean a Thing if It Ain't Got That Swing" - (Reprise)
