= Ben Mingay =

Australian singer and actor (born 1979)

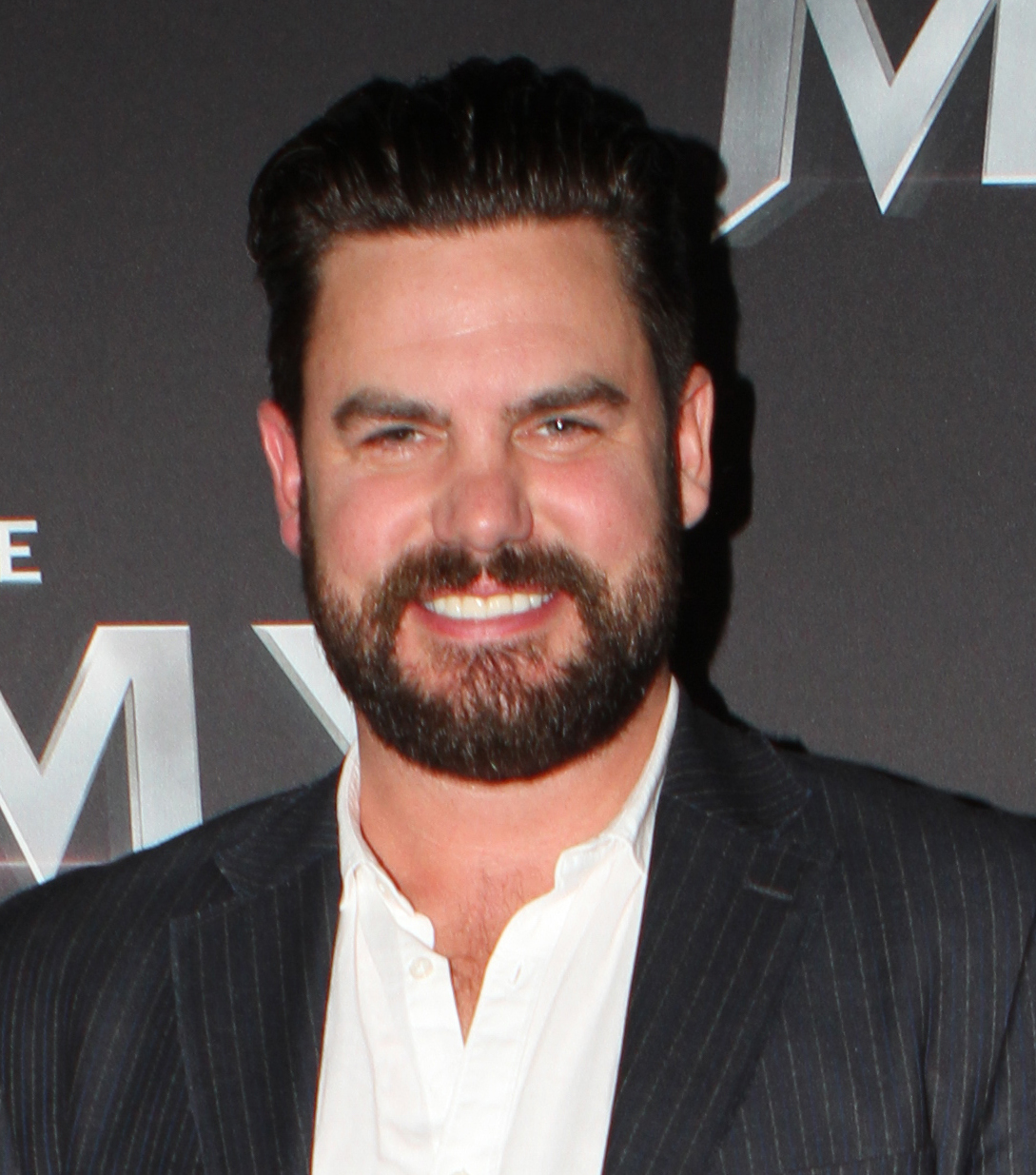
- Mingay at the Sydney premiere of The Mummy in 2017
- Born: 1979 (age 46–47); Elermore Vale, New South Wales, Australia
- Occupations: Actor, singer
- Years active: 1988–present
- Spouse: Kirby Burgess (m. 2018; div. 2020)

Ben Mingay (born 1979) is an Australian actor and singer, perhaps best known for having played Buzz Graham in the series Packed to the Rafters and Rob Duffy in Wonderland. He played the role of Billy in the stage version of Dirty Dancing in Australia, the United Kingdom and the United States. Mingay together with Michael Falzon, Luke Kennedy, and Matt Lee appeared in the Adelaide Cabaret Festival 2014. In 2015, Mingay joined the cast of soap opera Home and Away in the recurring role of Trystan Powell.

== Background ==
Growing up in Elermore Vale, New South Wales on the outskirts of Newcastle, Mingay went to boarding school, The Armidale School, from age 12.. He later completed his HSC at Shore in 1997. His mother suggested he do the school play to occupy his spare time. He thought it was for losers, but agreed to do it for her. He had to perform a song and discovered that he had a bass baritone voice. Mingay studied opera voice at the Sydney Conservatorium of Music. He plays both piano and acoustic guitar. He is also a fire breather and a stunt driver. He was married to actress Kirby Burgess, but they divorced after two years.

== Career ==
In 2004 he appeared as a guest on the police series Blue Heelers where he played Troy Baxter. That same year he starred as Jim Beatson on the medical series All Saints.

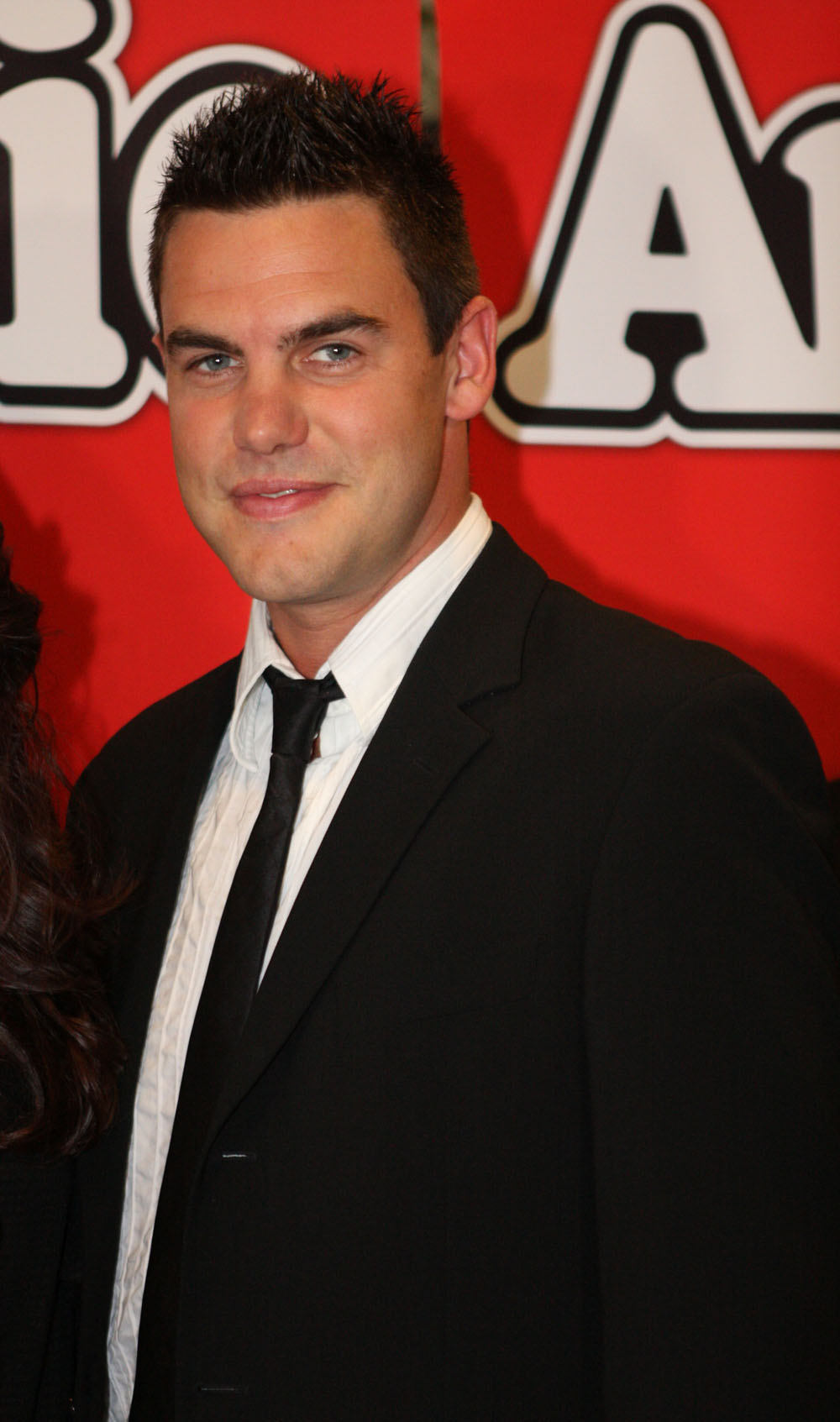
Mingay in 2012

In 2013, Mingay scored his first major role on television when he joined the main cast of the sixth season of Australian series Packed to the Rafters. He played the young electrician Fergus "Buzz" Graham, father of Jackson Graham (Narek Arman) and employee of Dave Rafter (Erik Thomson). Mingay's Graham enters into a relationship with Emma Mackey (Zoe Cramond) until the series finale on 2 July of that year. That same year, Mingay joined the main cast of Wonderland in the role of Rob Duffy.

Mingay performed in the new cabaret act Swing on This at the Adelaide Cabaret Festival on 7 June 2014 with a cast that included Luke Kennedy, Michael Falzon, and Matt Lee. Festival artistic director, and singer in her own right, Kate Ceberano appeared as a special guest. Following Adelaide Cabaret Festival, they performed as the headline act at both the official black tie launch of the refurbished Bunbury Regional Entertainment Centre on 25 July and at the community concert the next evening, again playing to a full house.

Mingay joined the cast of Home and Away as Trystan Powell in 2015.

Mingay has performed at several concerts including the charity benefit Pants Off for Beyond Blue, a concert involving several performers each singing in their underwear.

His professional opera debut came in 2024 in the role of Papageno in an English-language production Mozart's The Magic Flute for Opera Australia at the Sydney Opera House. He had sung in this opera before in a school production in 2000.

In 2019, Mingay appeared in the ABC series Frayed. Mingay would reprise his role from the first season in the second series of the show, which aired in 2021. In February 2021, Mingay was announced as part of the cast for the first series of Foxtel legal drama The Twelve.

== Training ==
- 1997 – Higher School Certificate (Shore) – Ranked top 10% of State in Music
- 1998 – NIDA: workshop stage, acting and improvisation skills
- 1999–2000 – Awarded the Florence Austral Scholarship for Voice from the Newcastle Conservatorium of Music
- 1999–2001 – Newcastle Conservatorium – vocal coach: Christopher Allan
- 2000–2003 – Classical training at Sydney Conservatorium of Music
- 2001–2003 – Sydney Conservatorium, vocal coach: Maree Ryan
- 2002 – Agent Showcase with REACTOR acting services at Fox Studios

== Theatre ==
Year	Title	Role	Company	Location	Ref
2003	Sideshow Alley: The Musical		The Production Company/ Gale Edwards	Melbourne	
2003	Hair	Berger	The Production Company/ David Atkins	Sydney; Melbourne	
2004–2005	Dirty Dancing	Billy	Nina Lannan & Associates; Mirvish Productions/ James Powell; Jacobsen Entertainment/ Karl Sydow; Jacobsen Entertainment	US National Tour; North American Premiere; UK Premiere; Australian Tour	
2011	Jersey Boys	Tommy Devito		Sydney	
	South Pacific				
18 May – 1 July 2012	An Officer and a Gentleman	Zack	Gordon Frost Organisation	Sydney Lyric	
2015	The Phantom of the Opera	The Phantom	Packemin Productions	Riverside Theatres Parramatta	
2020	Shrek the Musical	Shrek		Sydney Lyric, Her Majesty's Theatre, Melbourne & Queensland Performing Arts Centre	
2022	Bright Lights and Big Dreams			Adelaide Symphony Orchestra	
2022	La Cage Aux Folles	George		The Concert Hall	
2023	Sweeney Todd	Sweeney Todd		Sydney Opera House	
2024	The Magic Flute	Papageno	Opera Australia	Sydney Opera House	
2025	The Pirates of Penzance	The Pirate King	West Australian Opera	His Majesty's Theatre	

== Filmography ==
=== Television ===
Year	Title	Role	Notes	Ref
2004	All Saints	Jim Beatson	Episode: "Meltdown"	
2004	Blue Heelers	Troy Baxter	Episode: "Headless Chooks"	
2013	Packed to the Rafters	Fergus 'Buzz' Graham	11 episodes	
2013–15	Wonderland	Rob Duffy	Regular role	
2015	Home and Away	Trystan Powell	Recurring role	
2017	House of Bond	Alan Bond	TV mini-series, 2 episodes	
2017	Behave Yourself!	Himself	Contestant, episode 1	
2019-2021	Frayed	Jim	12 episodes	
2021	Amazing Grace	Jim Delaney	8 episodes	
2022	The Twelve	Flip Menelaus	10 episodes	

=== Film ===
Year	Title	Role	Notes
2013	The Gift	Joel	Short – with Mark Lee, Hannah Marshall, Anne Tenney and Harry Greenwood
2016	Hacksaw Ridge	'Grease' Nolan	
2018	Paper Cut	Pisser	Short
2024	Cut Short	Sid	Short

== Awards and nominations ==
=== ARIA Music Awards ===
The ARIA Music Awards is an annual awards ceremony held by the Australian Recording Industry Association. They commenced in 1987.

Year	Nominee / work	Award	Result	Ref.
2005	Dirty Dancing – The Classic Story on Stage (with Deone Zanotto)	Best Original Cast or Show Album	Nominated	
