= Swing on This =

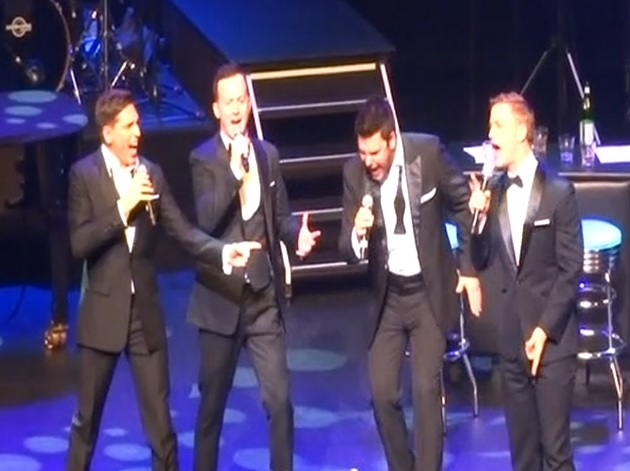
- Swing On This starring Michael Falzon, Matt Lee, Luke Kennedy and Ben Mingay debuting at Adelaide Festival Centre 6 June 2014

Background information
- Origin: Australia
- Genres: swing
- Years active: 2014–present
- Members: Michael Falzon; Luke Kennedy; Ben Mingay; Matt Lee; Bert LaBonte
- Website: swingonthis.com.au

Swing on This is made up of musical theatre leading men, Michael Falzon, Luke Kennedy, Matt Lee and Ben Mingay, singing a collection of classic swing songs reworked with a more contemporary style, as well as more recent popular music arranged for an 18 piece big band. Although songs range from Irving Berlin and Cole Porter through to more recent influences like Oasis, Swing On This embraces a more contemporary style of swing, with Falzon comparing it more to Michael Buble and Robbie Williams. Swing on This includes a medley of Australian classic rock and pop.

== History ==
Swing on This was originally conceived by Michael Falzon and had been in development for several years. Initially produced by Good Egg Creative and Asia Theatricals as a one-off, stand alone cabaret act specifically for the Adelaide Cabaret Festival, Swing on This debuted on 7 June 2014. Falzon claimed his intent was not about creating a boy band, but a group of "mates coming together and having a sing." He added that "The strength of this show is based on individual personalities and everyone brings something different."

Following Adelaide Cabaret Festival, they performed as the headline act at both the official black tie launch of the refurbished Bunbury Regional Entertainment Centre on 25 July and at the community concert the next evening, again playing to a full house. Falzon, Lee, Kennedy and Mingay were accompanied by the Perth Symphony Orchestra Big Band, part of the newly formed Perth Symphony Touring Ensemble. The freshly arranged Australian pop section was performed in Sydney for the first time at the Rob Guest Endowment concert on 13 October 2014. Their Gold Coast debut followed in March 2015 at Queensland's 1100 seat Arts Theatre. Swing on This made their television debut on Channel 9 Gold Telethon, 8 June 2015, a fundraiser for Sydney Children's Hospital. This performance included Mingay, Falzon and Lee. Kennedy and Falzon performed as Swing on This in Perth, Western Australia with Perth Symphony Orchestra Big Band for The Pinnacle Awards.

Swing On This was originally choreographed and directed by Christopher Horsey with Musical Direction by Craig Schneider. Music for Swing On This was arranged by Richard Sidwell, whom Falzon had worked with on Music of Queen: Rock and Symphonic Spectacular.

== Members ==
Whilst retaining its identity as a specific act, Swing on This also refers to the members of the cast. As Falzon describes it: "Rather than putting together a boy band it's about mates coming together and having a sing," Founding members of Swing on This include Michael Falzon, Luke Kennedy, Matt Lee, and Ben Mingay, all seasoned performers in their own right. Rob Mills joined in 2015, as a fifth member, due in part to Lee temporarily returning to Mary Poppins in the UK. The structure of Swing on This is specifically designed for a certain amount of fluidity, allowing the members to continue their individual careers and commitments.

On 23 June 2020, producer and founding member Michael Falzon died after a year long battle with germ cell cancer.

Bert La Bonté joined the group for the Lord Mayor's Christmas Carols in Brisbane, QLD in 2022 and Adelaide Cabaret Festival in June 2024

=== Guest performers ===
- Kate Ceberano

ARIA Hall of Fame singer songwriter Ceberano joined Swing on This on stage for their Adelaide Cabaret Festival debut performance. The successful soul, jazz and pop singer was in her final year as Director of the festival. She again joined Falzon, Kennedy, Mingay and Mills at a charity performance to raise funds for the Otis Foundation.

- Mini Mes

Four young male tap dancers were recruited for the Swing on This Gold Coast performance in Surfers Paradise. Riley Brooker, Harmi Davis, Kieren Bofinger and Brady Burchill were chosen by producer Michael Falzon and choreographer Christopher Horsey to perform on stage at the Arts Centre, which seats 1174. Four more young male dancers (Franco Lastra, Jacob Licastro, Kai Taylor and John Vallentine) were chosen for Swing on This at Theatre Royal, Sydney.

- Prinnie Stevens

The former The Voice contestant and star of Thriller - Live (Australian tour) joined Swing on This for performances at Theatre Royal, Sydney and Noosa Long Weekend Festival in 2016.
