= Riverside Theatres Parramatta =

Performing arts centre in Australia

Riverside Theatres

General information
- Type: Performing arts centre
- Location: Corner Church and Market Streets, Parramatta
- Current tenants: National Theatre of Parramatta; Packemin Productions; Cumberland Gang Show; (+ others)
- Construction started: 1986
- Opened: 27 February 1988
- Renovated: 2024–2028
- Owner: City of Parramatta

Design and construction
- Architects: Bryon Harford (Project Architect), New South Wales Government Architect

Other information
- Seating capacity: Riverside Theatre 761; Lennox Theatre 213; Rafferty's Theatre 88
- Public transit: Prince Alfred Square light rail

Website
- riversideparramatta.com.au

Riverside Theatres is a multi-venue performing arts centre located in the CBD of Parramatta in the western suburbs of Sydney, New South Wales, Australia.

Opened in 1988, its venues include the 761-seat proscenium arch Riverside Theatre, the 213-seat Lennox Theatre, and the 88-seat Rafferty's Theatre. The proscenium arch's architectural design is inspired by the common European Opera House concept, which lends an intimate and live performance space. It is considered to be an A Reserve house, which implies that the sight-lines are perfect for most seats and a standard ticket price is applicable to the entire house at the Hirer's discretion.

The National Theatre of Parramatta is a resident theatre company. Other regular companies and productions that perform there include Packemin Productions, Sydney Theatre Company, Sport For Jove, The Premier State Ballet, Cumberland Gang Show and Pacific Opera.

== History ==
The Riverside Theatres building is on a plot of land called "Prince Alfred Square" and was built where a public bathing building once was. The land was originally home to the Burramattagal Aboriginal people.

The 1970s saw proposals to construct a cultural centre in Parramatta, however this was not acted upon. In 1983, the Commonwealth and state governments recognised a need to build a new cultural centre in Parramatta and so they jointly committed six million dollars.

In 2023, funding was allocated for an upgrade to the existing Riverside Theatres building. In 2024, a design was chosen. Work will commence in late 2025 and is projected to be complete by 2028. During the renovation, Riverside Theatres moved to 5 Parramatta Square at PHIVE and adopted a new name of Riverside Live at PHIVE.
