= Rhonda Burchmore =

Australian entertainer

Rhonda Burchmore OAM
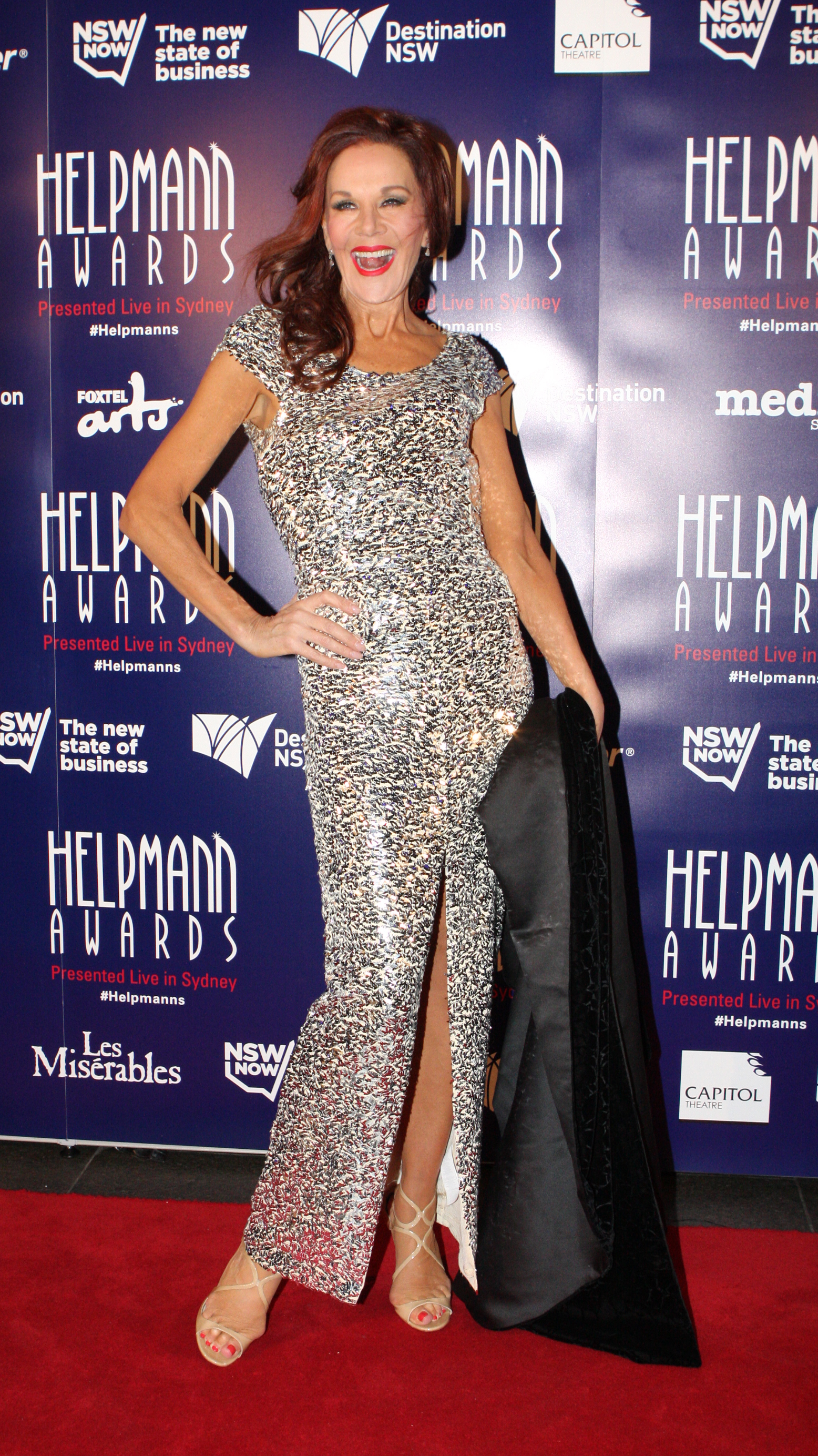
- Burchmore at the 2015 Helpmann Awards
- Born: Rhonda Suzanne Burchmore; 15 May 1960 (age 66); Sydney, New South Wales, Australia
- Occupations: Actress, singer
- Years active: 1982–present
- Website: rhondaburchmore.com

Rhonda Suzanne Burchmore (born 15 May 1960) is an Australian entertainer, most notable as an actress, recording artist and singer in musical theatre, she has appeared in numerous television shows and briefly in film.

== Career ==
Burchmore appeared as Kate in the 1982 film, The Pirate Movie. Burchmore gave her first Australian theatre performance in the 1988 production of Sugar Babies opposite Garry McDonald and Broadway performer Eddie Bracken. Later that year, she had a role in the West End production of Sugar Babies opposite Mickey Rooney and Ann Miller. Whilst in the U.K, Burchmore was cast in the revival of Stop the World – I Want to Get Off as well as a role in Hot Shoe Shuffle.

In 1997, Burchmore opened Melbourne's Crown Casino starring in Red Hot & Rhonda.

Burchmore had a role of Nadine Hale in Tommy Tune's stage version of Irving Berlin's Easter Parade, slated for Broadway but eventually the project stalled. Burchmore later appeared in another show, Stephen Sondheim's Into the Woods with the Melbourne Theatre Company (MTC).

Burchmore released her first album in 1998, the self-titled Rhonda Burchmore. Further albums include Midnight Rendezvous, Live at the Melbourne Concert Hall, Pure Imagination, and a recording of her stage show, Cry Me a River – The World of Julie London.

In 1999, Burchmore played the lead role in The Production Company's first show, Mame. She also played the roles in The Boyfriend Jerry's Girls & La Cage Aux Folles for The Production Company, and later returned in a new production of Mame in 2008.

Further roles followed, including Adelaide in an Australian revival of Guys and Dolls, Tanya in the successful Mamma Mia!, Urinetown The Musical, Tom Foolery, Respect: A Musical Journey of Women, and her own productions; Rhonda Burchmore Sings 'n Swings, My Funny Valentines and Fever.

In 2013, she performed in Trevor Ashley's musical comedy Little Orphan trAshley with Gary Sweet.

Other Australian stage credits include The Drowsy Chaperone in 2010 with Geoffrey Rush for the MTC, Song and Dance, They're Playing Our Song – as one of the alter egos, and Diana in Lend Me a Tenor. With the Victorian Opera Burchmore performed as Queen of the Fairies in Iolanthe, as Prince Orlofsky in Die Fledermaus with Joan Carden, in Ruddigore and An Evening with Sondheim.

Burchmore's television credits include regular appearances on Carols by Candlelight, in the variety show Hey Hey It's Saturday, the quiz show Spicks and Specks and also guest roles in the sitcom Kath & Kim and on the TV series Love Child.

In 2019, it was announced Burchmore had been cast in the role of Grandma Viv in new Seven Network sitcom, Fam Time.

In 2020, Burchmore entered the Jungle to compete in the sixth season of the Australian version of I'm a Celebrity...Get Me Out of Here! and was placed third.

== Personal life ==
Burchmore was born in Sydney, and attended Beverly Hills Girls High School. She gained a scholarship to the University of New England where she majored in Theatre Arts. Burchmore and her husband, Nick, a psychiatrist, have a daughter. In 2010 she published her autobiography, Legs 11: The Rhonda Burchmore Story, named after the bingo-based popular epithet for her long-legged physique.

== Discography ==
=== Albums ===
List of albums, with selected details
Title	Details
Rhonda Burchmore	Released: 1998; Format: CD; Label: Shock (SHOCK 0026)
Midnight Rendezvous (with the Ray Alldridge Trio)	Released: 2001; Format: CD; Label: Shock (RB001)
Live at the Melbourne Concert Hall	Released: 2003; Format: CD; Label: Shock (RB002)
Together Alone (with Bobby Valentine)	Released: 2006; Format: CD; Label: Sound Vault(SV0520)
Pure Imagination	Released: 2008; Format: CD; Label: Shock (RB003)
Cry Me a River – The World of Julie London	Released: 2013; Format: CD, digital; Label: ABC Music (374 3283)
A Red Hot Swinging Christmas with The Jack Earle Big Band)	Scheduled: November 2022; Format: CD, digital; Label: ABC Music (ABCM0005)

=== Charting singles ===
List of singles, with selected chart positions
Title	Year	Peak chart positions	Album
Title	Year	AUS	Album
"Hold Me Now"	1993	55	Non-album single

== Honours ==
In the January 2014 Australia Day Honours List Burchmore was awarded a medal of the Order of Australia (OAM) "For service to the performing arts, and to the community."

=== Mo Awards ===
The Australian Entertainment Mo Awards (commonly known informally as the Mo Awards), were annual Australian entertainment industry awards. They recognise achievements in live entertainment in Australia from 1975 to 2016. Rhonda Burchmore won one award in that time.

Year	Nominee / work	Award	Result (wins only)
1999	Rhonda Burchmore	Female Vocal Variety Performer of the Year	Won

== Filmography ==
Title	Year	Role
The Pirate Movie	1982	Kate
Melvin, Son of Alvin	1984	Phillipa Stanton
The Flying Doctors (TV series)	1986	Carol
The Silence of the Hams (TV movie)	1992	Woman in Black - Bubbles
Remembering Nigel	2009	Rhonda Burchmore
The Wedding Party	2010	Cheryl
Love Child (TV series)	2014	Dawn
Finally Me	2023	Molly Able

== Theatre ==
Sourced from the AusStage database: Rhonda Burchmore Theatre

Title	Year
They're Playing Our Song	1980/1981
The Ritz Company	1983
Song and Dance	1983
Baby	1986
Sugar Babies	1987
Lend Me A Tenor	1987-1991
The Marriage of Fabio	1991
Iolanthe	1991
Petrov: The Musical	1992
Hot Shoe Shuffle	1992/1993/1994
Annie Get Your Gun	1992
An Evening with Fred and Ginger	1993
Ruddigore	1995
Aladdin	1996
Hey, Heys It's Cindearlla	1996
Red Hot and Rhonda	1997
A One Night Stand with the stars of Australian Musical Theatre	1997
Into the Woods	1998
Mame	1999
Guys and Dolls Concert	1999
Mamma Mia!	2001
Guys and Dolls	2002
Rhonda Burchmore Sings and Swings	2003
Sydney Symphony	2005
Urinetown, The Musical	2006
Tomfoolery	2006
Respect: A Musical Journey of Woman	2007
Everybody Loves Rhonda	2008
A Musical Send Off	2008
Gala Concert	2008
An All-Star Tribute to Peter Allen	2008
Rhonda Burchmore	2009
The BoyFriend	2009
Eurobeat	2009
The Drowsy Chaperone	2010
Calendar Girls	2010
Hats Off!	2010
Oz Made Musicals 2010	2010
Cry Me a River: The World of Julie London	2012
Jerry's Girls	2015
Rhonda Burchmore on Broadway	2016
Hairspray	2023
Sister Act the Musical	2024/25
Follies	2025
Anastasia	2026
