= Dein Perry =

Australian tap dancer

Dein Perry is an Australian tap dancer. He is founder of the recurrent tap dance production Tap Dogs. His film credits include work done on the Australian movie Bootmen, as well as choreographic work on Happy Feet 2.

== Early life and career ==
Perry grew up in Newcastle. He received dance lessons from the age of four. He left school at the age of sixteen to work as a Fitter and Turner, before moving to Sydney a year later to pursue dance

== Sydney 2000 Olympics opening ceremony ==
Perry choreographed the tap dance segment "Eternity" for the Sydney 2000 Olympics opening ceremony. The dance troupe was performed by the Tap Dogs and 1300 Tap Dancers led by Bootmen star Adam Garcia.

== Shows ==
- West Side Story (1980) Dancer
- Paint Your Wagon (1986) Dancer
- Rasputin (1987) Dancer
- My Fair Lady (1989) Dancer
- Man of La Mancha (1990) Dancer
- 42nd St (1991) Actor, Dancer
- Hot Shoe Shuffle (1993) Choreographer, Dancer
- Tap Dogs (1995 - Current) Owner, Creator, Director, Choreographer
- Steel City (1998) Creator, Director, Choreographer

== Films ==
- Bootmen (2000) Executive Producer, Director, Choreographer, Actor
- Happy Feet 2 (2011) Tap Choreographer
- Dhoom 3 (2013) Tap Choreographer

== Award ==
Perry won the Laurence Olivier Award for two consecutive years (in 1995 and 1996). At the time he was the youngest person to do so.

| Year | Nominee / work | Award | Result |
|---|---|---|---|
| 1994 | Best Short Program (Tap Dogs) | Video Dance Festival of Strasbourg Prize | Won |
| 1995 | Best Theatre Choreographer (with David Atkins for Hot Shoe Shuffle) | Laurence Olivier Theatre Award | Won |
| 1995 | Best Supporting Role (Hot Shoe Shuffle) | Green Room Awards (Melbourne) | Nominated |
| 1995 | Best Original Choreography (Hot Shoe Shuffle) | Green Room Awards | Won |
| 1995 | Outstanding Production at the Edinburgh Festival (Tap Dogs) | Glasgow Herald Angel Award | Won |
| 1995 | Dance Performer of the Year | Australian Green Room Award | Nominated |
| 1995 | Best Performance by an Ensemble Cast (Tap Dogs) | Australian Green Room Award | Won |
| 1995 | Excellence in Live Performance (Tap Dogs) | Australian Green Room Award | Nominated |
| 1996 | Best Choreographer (Tap Dogs) | Laurence Olivier Theatre Award | Won |
| 1996 | Best New Production Off Broadway Theatre 1996 (Tap Dogs) | NY Obie Award | Won |
| 1996 | Dance Performer of the Year | Mo Awards | Won |
| 1996 | Best Original Choreography (Tap Dogs) | Green Room Awards | Won |
| 1996 | Outstanding Contribution to Musical Theatre (Tap Dogs) | Mo Awards | Nominated |
| 1997 | Outstanding Choreography (Tap Dogs) | Drama Desk Awards | Nominated |
| 1997 | Dance Performer of the Year | Mo Awards | Won |
| 1997 | Most Popular Production at The Spoleto Festival (Tap Dogs) | Pegasus Award | Nominated |
| 1997 | Entertainer of the Year | Variety Heart Award | Won |
| 1997 | Australian Show Business Ambassador of the Year 1997 | Mo Awards | Nominated |
| 1997 | Australian Performer of the Year | Mo Awards | Nominated |
| 1998 | Best Choreography (Tap Dogs) | Australian Dance Awards | Won |
| 1998 | Dance Performer of the Year | Mo Awards | Won |
| 1998 | Show Business Ambassador of the Year (Tap Dogs) | Mo Awards | Won |
| 2000 | Best Film (Bootmen) | AFI Awards | Nominated |
| 2005 | Outstanding Performance by a Male Dancer | Australian Dance Awards | Won |
| 2005 | Best Male Dancer in a Dance Work | Helpman Awards | Nominated |
| 2005 | Best Special Event Tap Dogs 10 Year Anniversary | Helpman Awards | Nominated |
| 2013 | Outstanding Performance in Commercial Dance or Musical Theatre (Tap Dogs) | Australian Dance Awards (Tap Dogs) | Won |
| 2013 | Best Original Choreography (Hot Shoe Shuffle) | Green Room Awards | Won |
