= Patrick Roberts (violinist) =

Australian violinist

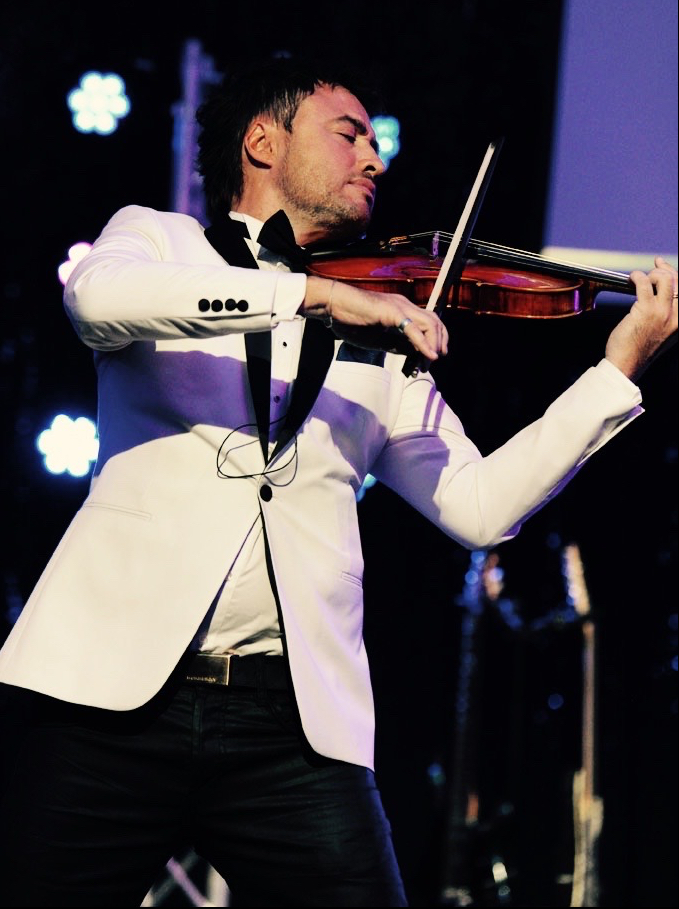
- Patrick Roberts performing in Melbourne in 2015

Background information
- Born: 25 October 1981 (age 45); Melbourne, Australia
- Genres: Classical; crossover
- Occupation: Violinist
- Instrument: Violin
- Years active: 1997-present
- Labels: Sony Australia, Universal Music
- Website: patrickrobertsofficial.com

Patrick Roberts (born 25 October 1981) is an Australian crossover violinist and recording artist. Roberts is best known for his contemporary renditions of popular classical music. He is also an ambassador for the National Breast Cancer Foundation.

== Early life ==
Roberts was born in Melbourne, Australia. At the age of five his mother and father bought him a violin and introduced him to lessons; he soon began performing to close friends and family. At the age of eleven, he was invited to perform live on stage by concert and event organisers at The Australian International Airshow 2017.

In 1998, Roberts trained at the Conservatorium of Music in Melbourne, where he was awarded the Betty Barwell Scholarship and Dame Nellie Melba Scholarship. He studied with Eastern European teachers during his upbringing with notable connections with Mark Mogilevski and Ivana Tomaskova.

Roberts played in the Melbourne Symphony Orchestra for several years before being a soloist for the Victorian Concert Orchestra.

== Career ==
=== 2006-present ===
In 2010, Roberts released his album All in Love is Fair featuring songs inspired by his tour of Europe in 2008.

In 2013, he released his album Vision with guest performances by the National Boys Choir and blind guitarist Lorin Nicholson on the track Ave Maria.

In 2018 Roberts released Pink through Sony Music. Proceeds from the sale of PINK were donated to the National Breast Cancer Foundation.

In 2019 Roberts launched his album All Out of Love while making his performance debut at the Sydney Opera House performing solo alongside Graham Russell and Russell Hitchcock and the Metropolitan Orchestra. In May 2019 Air Supply invited Roberts to perform solo at the Orleans Casino showroom in Las Vegas during their USA tour.

In November 2020, Roberts released his seventh studio album Imagine with Sony Music Australia, mastered by Andy Walter at Abbey Road Studios in London who also mastered the Beatles Anthology edition. The album features classic Beatles songs performed on violin and also a special re-recording of 'Saltwater' featuring Julian Lennon and Tommy Emmanuel. 20% of the proceeds of Imagine went to the Sony Foundation Australia to help young Australians affected by severe illnesses and homelessness and a portion of the proceeds of album sales also went to Julian Lennon's White Feather Foundation. The album reached No.1 on the Classical/Crossover ARIA chart.

In 2022 Roberts signed to Decca records and released his new album Fragile featuring Sting and Tommy Emmanuel on February 18, 2022 through Decca Records. The album debuted at No.1 on the ARIA classical / crossover charts. 50% of all album proceeds went to the Rainforest Fund to help prevent global deforestation.

On June 28 Roberts was invited to perform live with Sting at Chateau de Chambord in France as part of his My Songs tour. This concert was in front of over 18,000 people and also televised throughout France.

== Discography ==
=== Albums ===
Title	Details	Peak chart positions	
Title	Details	AUS	AUS Classical
All in Love Is Fair	Released: 2010; Label: Patrick Roberts; Formats: CD, digital download	—	4
Vision'	Released: 2013; Label: Patrick Roberts; Formats: CD, digital download	—	—
Have Yourself a Merry Little Christmas	Released: December 2016; Label: Patrick Roberts; Formats: CD, digital download	—	—
Pink	Released: 17 September 2017; Label: Sony Music Australia (88985469122); Formats: CD, digital download	—	1
All Out of Love	Released: 12 April 2019; Label: ABC Music (4817991); Formats: CD, digital download	—	—
Imagine	Released: 6 November 2020; Label: Sony Music Australia (19439824272); Formats: CD, digital download	92	1
Fragile	Released: 18 February 2022; Label: Decca Records (4857263); Formats: CD, digital download	—	1
Del Gesu	Released: 17 April 2026; Label: Decca Records (4879367); Formats: CD, digital download	48	2
