= New Musicals Australia =

New Musicals Australia is a music theatre workshopping program founded in 2010 by Century Venues with the support of the Australia Council Music Board.

== History ==
New Musicals Australia was founded in 2010 by director and producer Kris Stewart, who also founded the New York Musical Theatre Festival.

== Panel ==
The program selects a number of original musicals by Australian composers, lyricists and bookwriters to be workshopped and presented to a selected panel of theatre professionals. This panel is also involved in the selection of musicals to be workshopped and includes:

- Stephen Schwartz (Patron), composer and lyricist
- Peter Casey, musical director
- Kellie Dickerson, musical director
- Rodney Dobson, performer
- Neil Gooding, producer and director
- Roger Hodgman, director
- Karen Johnson Mortimer, director
- Jennifer Murphy, director and educator
- Guy Noble, musical director
- Peter Ross, producer and director
- Darren Yap, director

== Venues ==
New Musicals Australia is operated out of a collection of entertainment spaces owned by Century Venues.
