= Suzanne Clachair =

Australian singer and songwriter

- Born: 1961/1962; Australia
- Years active: 1988-1995
- Website: https://www.suzanneclachair.com

Suzanne Clachair (born 1961/1962) is an Australian singer and songwriter.

== Career ==
Clachair developed her interest in music as a child. She made her first professional appearance at the age of fifteen on the ABC show Country Music. She then came to prominence at age 16 after winning the ABC's nationally televised talent show Quest '78 with her performance of "Don't Cry for Me Argentina".

Clachair completed a scholarship in singing at the Queensland Conservatorium of Music and later graduated with a Business Degree in Communication from Queensland University of Technology and a Diploma in Education from The University of Queensland. She found employment first as a High School teacher and later, a Marketing consultant all the while maintaining a passion for her music.

Almost a decade after winning Quest, a TV commercial featuring Clachair singing "Barcarolle" was the catalyst for Clachair's recording career. The commercial took the public by storm; the TV Network was inundated with callers wanting to purchase the vocal soundtrack.

WEA Records signed and released Clachair's debut album of the same name in 1988. The album peaked at number 38 on the ARIA charts in May 1989.

In 1990, Clachair gave birth to her first child and signed with CBS Records, which released Serenade. The album peaked at number 20 on the ARIA chart and was certified gold. A TV special, An Evening with Suzanne Clachair was also aired.

In 1991, Clachair was the special guest during Julio Iglesias' Australian tour and she performed with him in Las Vegas. Clachair's third album, Believe in Love was released in November 1991 and was quickly followed by another TV special.

For the next three years, a hectic touring schedule saw Clachair perform to capacity audiences throughout Australia; from singing the Australian National Anthem at national and international sporting events to headlining at the Sydney Opera House and appearing regularly on Nine Network's The Midday Show with Ray Martin.

In April 1994, Clachair released her fourth studio album, Romance. The album peaked at number 62 on the ARIA charts.

In 1995, Clachair gave birth to her second daughter and reduced her performance commitments to devote time to her family and return to her studies, completing a post-graduate degree in Counselling.

== Discography ==
=== Studio albums ===
List of studio albums, with selected details
Title	Details	Peak chart positions	Certification
Title	Details	AUS	Certification
Barcarolle	Released: December 1988; Label: WEA Records (600151.1); Format: LP, Cassette	38	
Serenade	Released: November 1990; Label: CBS Records (467599.1); Format: LP, Cassette	20	ARIA: Gold
Believe in Love	Released: November 1991; Label: Columbia Records (469169.1); Format: LP, CD	98	
Romance	Released: April 1994; Label: Pacific Rim Productions (SLC.2); Format: CD	62	
