= Adam Garcia =

Australian actor and tap dancer

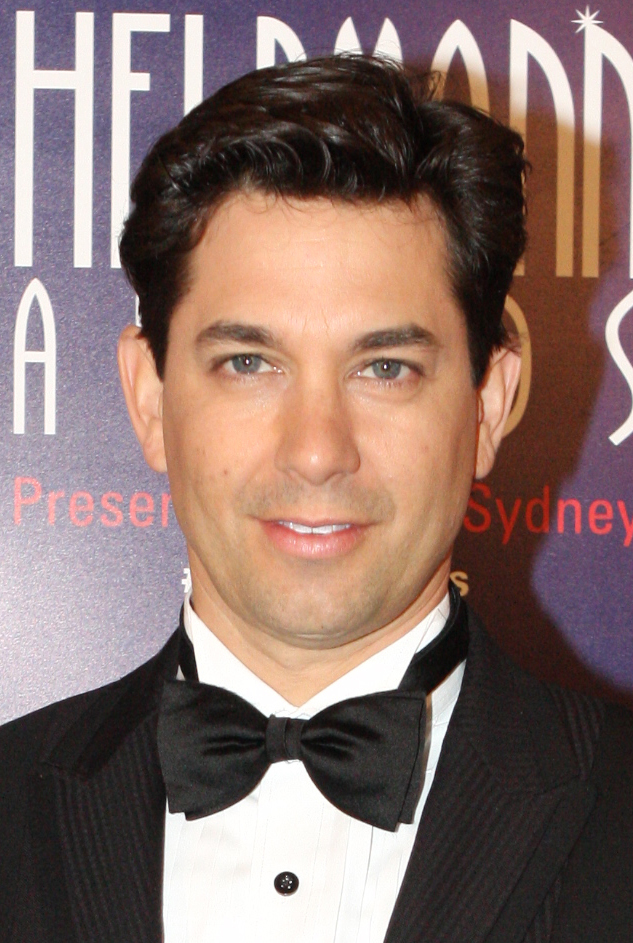
- Garcia in 2015
- Occupations: Actor; singer; dancer
- Years active: 1991–present
- Known for: Saturday Night Fever
- Notable work: Saturday Night Fever; Wicked; Coyote Ugly
- Spouse: Nathalia Chubin (m. 2015)
- Children: 2

Adam Garcia is an Australian actor who is best known for lead roles in musicals such as Saturday Night Fever and Kiss Me, Kate. He is also a trained tap dancer and singer. Garcia has been nominated twice at the Laurence Olivier Awards in 1999 and 2013.

== Early life ==
Garcia is the son of Jean Balharry and Fabio Garcia. His mother is Australian, and his father is from Colombia. Garcia's mother is a retired physiotherapist. Garcia attended Knox Grammar School where he completed his high school education. He also received formal tap dance training at Capital Dance Studio in Sydney, Australia. Garcia attended Sydney University, but did not complete his education as he left the university to take the role of Slide in the production of the musical Hot Shoe Shuffle, which toured Australia for two years before transferring to London, England.

== Career ==
Garcia began his film career in 1997, playing the role of Jones in Brian Gilbert's Wilde. Garcia played Tony Manero in the stage version of Saturday Night Fever, which premiered on 5 May 1998 at the London Palladium, and closed on 26 February 2000. He was nominated for his work in the play at the Laurence Olivier Award for Best Actor in a Musical category in 1999, but lost to the cast of Kat and the Kings. Garcia also reached number 15 in the UK Singles Chart in 1998, with his cover version of the Bee Gees song "Night Fever", taken from the film version of Saturday Night Fever (1977). In 2000, he played a major role in his second feature-film, Coyote Ugly. Later that year, Garcia also appeared in Dein Perry's Bootmen, playing the lead role.

In 2003, he voiced the title character in the film Kangaroo Jack but was not credited for that role.

In 2004, he also played alongside Lindsay Lohan and Megan Fox in Confessions of a Teenage Drama Queen, as the character Stu Wolff, a drunk rock star, who is part of the band Sidarthur and is, in Lola's words, "a greater poet than Shakespeare". Between 2006 and 2007, Garcia played the character of Fiyero in the original West End production of Wicked alongside Idina Menzel, Kerry Ellis and Helen Dallimore. He previously played the same role during the show's early Broadway theatre workshops in 2000. Garcia appeared in two ITV dramas, Britannia High and Mr Eleven, in 2008.

In January 2010, Garcia appeared with Ashley Banjo and Kimberly Wyatt as a judge on the British reality show Got to Dance. He was a judge in the four seasons of the competition, from 2010 to 2012 and then again in 2014.

In 2011, Garcia co-starred with Mischa Barton in The Hen Do, but the film never left the cutting room floor.

In 2012, he appeared in Cole Porter's musical Kiss Me, Kate at the Chichester Festival Theatre, directed by Trevor Nunn and choreographed by Stephen Mear. Garcia was nominated for his role at the 2013 Laurence Olivier Awards in the category Best Performance in a Supporting Role in a Musical.

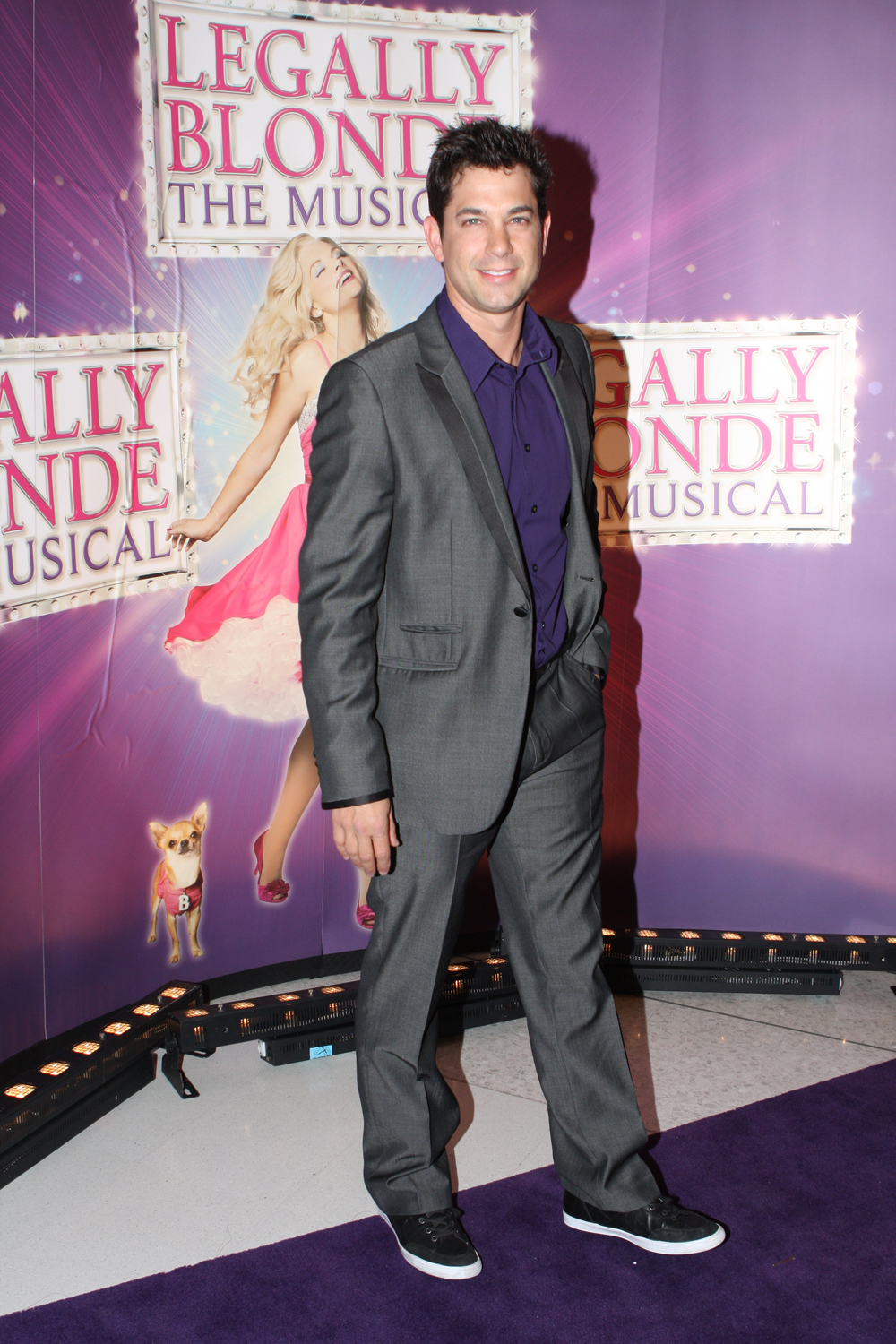
Garcia in 2012

Garcia appeared in Threesome, a 2011 British television sitcom which began airing on 17 October 2011 on Comedy Central. Garcia became the fourth judge during the thirteenth season of the Australian version of Dancing with the Stars.

In 2016, Garcia began an Australian national tour production of Singin' in the Rain as Don Lockwood, but was injured onstage in Melbourne, ending his run. Later that year he played Father Damian Karras in the UK premiere of The Exorcist opening at the Birmingham Repertory Theatre in October 2016 and transferring to the Phoenix Theatre in the West End in October 2017. He also filmed on location for Murder on the Orient Express.

In 2018, Garcia was cast in Dance Boss, an Australian reality television dance competition on the Seven Network presented by Dannii Minogue. He judged the competition alongside singer and dancer Timomatic and actress and performer Sharni Vinson. Later that year he played the Artilleryman in the 40th-anniversary tour of Jeff Wayne’s War of the Worlds, to critical acclaim.

In 2019, he filmed Death on the Nile, and in December starred in a pantomime in Ipswich, England, as Prince Charming.

In 2021, Garcia played the father of a dead girl (Victoria Justice) who comes back to make things right in the teen movie Afterlife of the Party directed by Stephen Herek.

In 2022, Garcia appeared in the second UK series of The Masked Dancer. He finished in second place for the series as the character "Onomatopoeia".

In 2024, Garcia played Caractacus Potts in a UK and Ireland tour of Chitty Chitty Bang Bang.

== Personal life ==
In January 2015, it was reported that Garcia was engaged to British brand manager Nathalia Chubin. He proposed to her in Sydney, Australia while visiting his family. Chubin previously worked as a senior marketing executive for PlayStation. They got married in London later that year. The couple have a daughter and a son together and split their time between Australia, England and the United States.

== Filmography ==
=== Film ===
Year	Title	Role	Notes
1997	Wilde	Jones	
2000	Coyote Ugly	Kevin O'Donnell	
2000	Bootmen	Sean	
2001	Riding in Cars with Boys	Jason D'Onofrio	
2002	The First $20 Million Is Always the Hardest	Andy	
2003	Kangaroo Jack	Kangaroo Jack	Voice-over Uncredited
2004	Love's Brother	Gino Donnini	
2004	Confessions of a Teenage Drama Queen	Stu Wolff	
2004	Fascination	Scott Doherty	
2005	Riot at the Rite	Vaslav Nijinsky	
2005	Standing Still	Michael	
2010	Every Emotion Costs	Wade	
2014	Nativity 3: Dude, Where's My Donkey?	Bradley Finch	Leading role
2017	Murder on the Orient Express	Italian Fan (photographer)	
2021	Afterlife of the Party	Howie	
2021	Death Link	Dr. Yates	
2022	Death on the Nile	Syd (photographer)	

=== Television ===
Year	Title	Role	Notes
2004	Agatha Christie's Marple	Raymond Starr	Episode: "The Body in the Library"
2005	Doctor Who	Alex	Episode: "The Christmas Invasion"
2008	Britannia High	Stefan	5 episodes
2009	Hawthorne	Nick Mancini	4 episodes
2009	The Flight of the Conchords	Obnoxious Australian	Episode: "The Tough Brets"
2009	Mister Eleven	Alex	2 episodes
2009-2012	Got to Dance	Adam García	38 episodes
2010	Bookaboo	Adam García	Episode: "Wolf's Magnificent Master Plan"
2010	Heston's Titanic Feast	Adam García	Television special
2010	House	Theodore Phillip Taylor	Episode: "The Choice"
2011	Threesome	Dave	3 episodes
2013	Camp	Todd	10 episodes
2013-2014	Dancing with the Stars	Adam García	15 episodes
2014	Perception	Dr. Asper	Episode: "Eternity"
2014	The Code	Perry Benson	6 episodes
2016	Bruce's Hall of Fame with Alexander Armstrong	Adam García	Television film Performer (with Kimberly Wyatt)
2017	Genius	Moe Berg	Episode: "Einstein: Chapter Nine"
2018	Dance Boss	Adam García	6 episodes
2019	Agatha Raisin	George Felliet	Episode: "The Deadly Dance"
2022	The Serpent Queen	Sebastio	3 episodes
2022	The Masked Dancer	Adam García / Onomatopoeia	6 episodes

== Awards and nominations ==
Year	Awards	Category	Recipient	Outcome
1999	Laurence Olivier Awards	Best Actor in a Musical	Saturday Night Fever	Nominated
2013	Laurence Olivier Awards	Best Performance in a Supporting Role in a Musical	Kiss Me, Kate	Nominated
