= Matt Lee (dancer) =

Australian dancer and actor

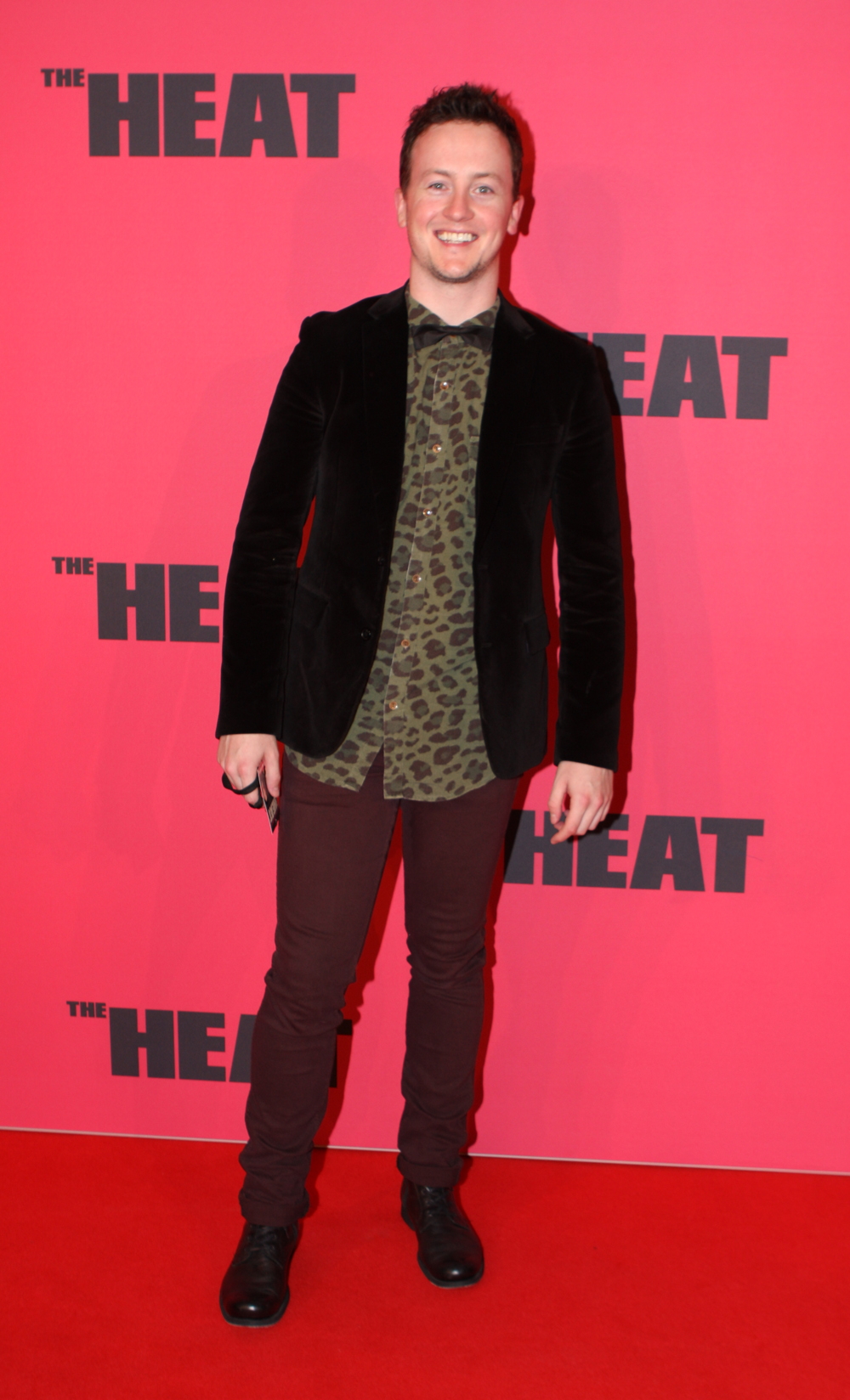
- Matt Lee in July 2013
- Born: Australia
- Occupations: Dancer; Actor; TV personality Choreographer
- Years active: 1994 – present
- Dancing career
- Former groups: Tap Dogs

Matt Lee is an Australian dancer and actor. He has starred in Bootmen, We Will Rock You, Rent, Grease, and Mary Poppins for which he won a Helpmann Award for Best Actor in a Musical. He was a motion capture principal for the Oscar winning film Happy Feet where he brought to life the loveable tap dancing penguin Mumble. He has choreographed for, and worked alongside Paula Abdul, Ricky Martin, Human Nature, Samantha Jade, Hilary Duff and Christine Anu. He was also a judge and choreographer for So You Think You Can Dance.

Lee appeared at the Adelaide Cabaret Festival in June 2014, performing a new show Swing on This together with Ben Mingay, Luke Kennedy, and Michael Falzon. Swing on This is a collection of classic swing songs reworked with a more contemporary style, as well as more recent popular music arranged for an 18 piece big band.

== Biography ==
Lee started dancing at the age of six, and began his professional career at thirteen.

"I think I was just very lucky to have found what I really wanted to do for the rest of my life at a young age,"

During his acceptance speech at the 2011 Helpmann Awards, Lee claimed to have always wanted to sing like fellow nominee, Anthony Warlow.

== Career ==
The first international production of The Witches of Eastwick opened in Australia at the Princess Theatre, Melbourne, with Lee as Michael Spofford, and starring comedian Paul McDermott as Darryl van Horne, Marina Prior as Jane, Angela Toohey as Alexandra and Pippa Grandison as Sukie, with Sabrina Batshon as The Little Girl. The show began previews on 19 August 2002. Revisions were made, including new lyrics and the excision of one number, 'Loose Ends'. However, the show never found an audience and closed on 17 November 2002.

Lee was cast in the role of Bert in the first Australian production of Mary Poppins which began previews at Her Majesty's Theatre in Melbourne on 14 July 2010. The show officially opened on 29 July. The cast also included Australian theatre icons Marina Prior as Mrs Banks, Debra Byrne as The Bird Woman, Philip Quast as Mr Banks, Judi Connelli as Miss Andrew, Sally Anne Upton as Mrs Brill, and Christopher Rickerby as Robertson Ay. Verity Hunt-Ballard played Mary Poppins. The Melbourne production closed on 1 April 2011. It was also confirmed that the musical would play in Sydney at the Capitol Theatre starting in April 2011 concluding its run mid December 2011. The musical then went on an Australian tour, playing at the Lyric Theatre in Brisbane until March 2012 and the Burswood Theatre, Perth until June 2012. After a four-month break, the production opened at the Civic Theatre in Auckland, New Zealand, from 18 October until 30 December. An Australian Cast Recording was released on 18 February 2011. Lee reprised the role of Bert for the Mary Poppins 2015-2017 UK and International tour which began on 12 October 2015 at the Leicester Curve and concluded at the Dubai Royal Opera on 26 May 2017.

The Production Company 2013 performance of Singin' in the Rain saw Lee cast as Cosmo Brown opposite Rohan Browne's Don Lockwood, with Alinta Chidzey as Kathy and Christie Whelan-Browne as Lina Lamont. Traditionally for The Production Company, Singin' in the Rain had a short season, running from 21 to 25 August.

Lee performed in the new cabaret act Swing on This at the Adelaide Cabaret Festival on 7 June 2014 with a cast that included Luke Kennedy, Michael Falzon, and Ben Mingay. Festival Artistic Director, and singer in her own right, Kate Ceberano appeared as a special guest. Following Adelaide Cabaret Festival, they performed as the headline act at both the official black tie launch of the refurbished Bunbury Regional Entertainment Centre on 25 July and at the community concert the next evening, again playing to a full house. Notably, Lee performed the classic swing number Mr Bojangles, including a tap routine choreographed by Chris Horsey.

Lee was a judge on the television talent show So You Think You Can Dance along with Jason Coleman and Bonnie Lythgoe.

Lee was a dance adjudicator at the Gold Coast Eisteddfod in August 2019.

== Awards and nominations ==
| Award | Category | Production | Role | Year | Result |
|---|---|---|---|---|---|
| Helpmann Awards | Best Male Actor in a Musical | Mary Poppins | Bert | 2011 | Won |
| Australian Dance Awards | Outstanding Performance in a Stage Musical | Mary Poppins | Bert | 2011 | Nominated |
| Logie Awards | Most Popular Male Talent | So You Think You Can Dance Australia | | 2009 | Nominated |
