= Jean-Claude Thibaut =

French filmmaker

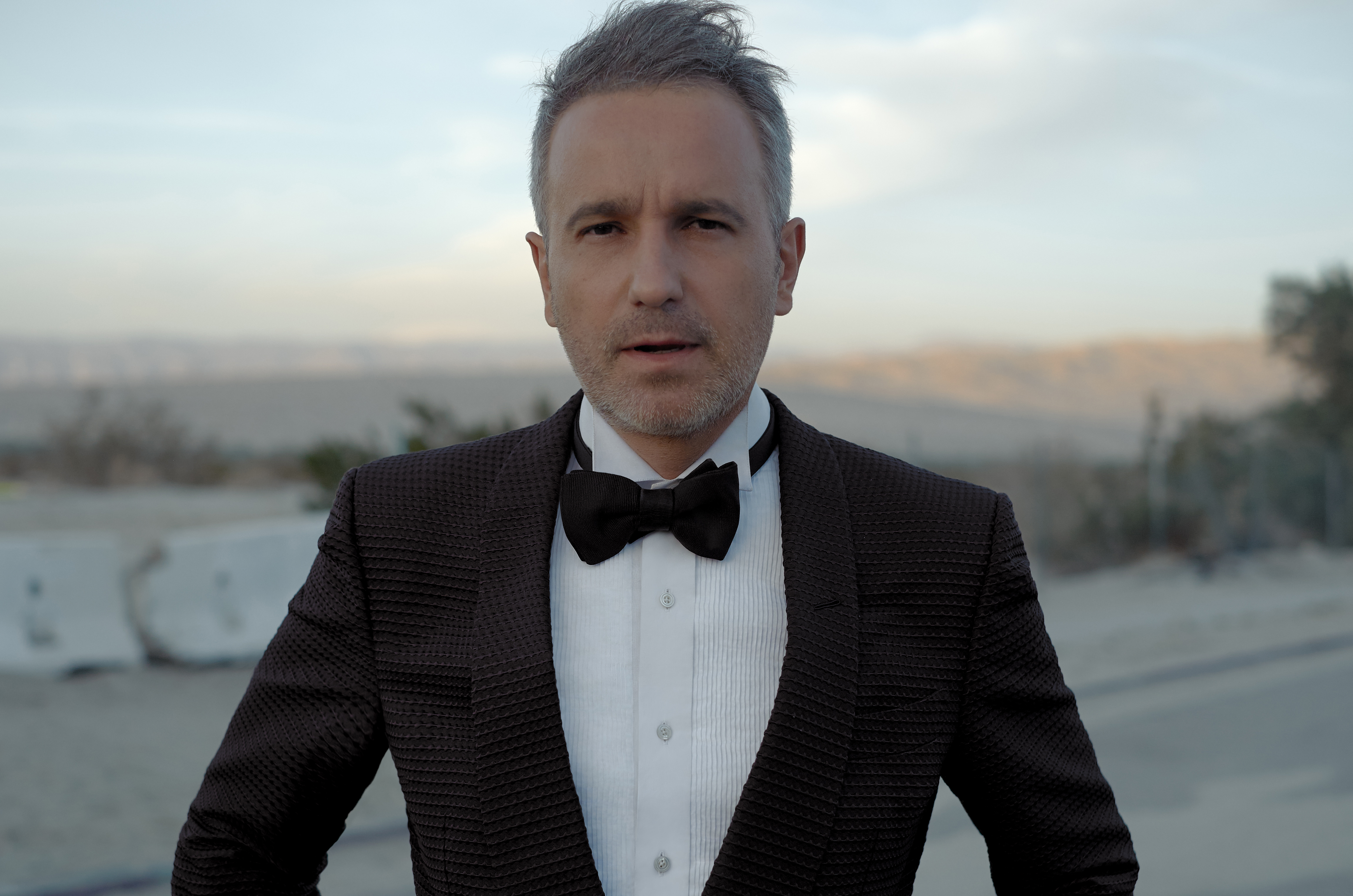
- Jean-Claude Thibaut in a shoot in Paris, 2015
- Born: Jean-Claude Thiabut
- Other names: Thibaut, Jean Claude
- Occupations: Film director, film producer, music video director
- Notable work: When L.A. is a Man for Louis Vuitton
- Website: http://www.armoredpictures.com

Jean-Claude Thibaut is a French filmmaker and producer.

Jean-Claude Thibaut has directed Jon Hamm, Catherine Zeta-Jones, Sophie Marceau and Naomi Campbell among others ...Thibaut collaborates with Estee Lauder, Chanel, Dior and Louis Vuitton.

Thibaut received the 2004 Philips Morris award « 400 Copies in Theater » for his short film about a robot-cop fly in Lethal Wings, underlined by one of the earliest Alexandre Desplat soundtracks, which in turn also received the Audience Award in Beauvais and participated in more than 70 festivals around the world including Los Angeles Film Festival and the Chicago International Film Festival. In 2012 The Peninsula Hotels campaign “Peninsula Moments”, written by Thibaut received the 2012 Bronze Excellence in Branded Content Award, tailing Disney and HSBC.

Jean-Claude Thibaut is well known for his successful brand contents campaign for Louis Vuitton, a film series on cities Los Angeles and Hong Kong using gender as a lens to interpret each city’s identity, introducing young rising stars as Ethan Peck, Grace Huang and Cosmo Wolski and Rosey Chan. In 2011 Thibaut co-produced For Lovers Only, rated top romance Indie film in iTunes USA in 2012, directed by Michael Polish with Stana Katic Castle (TV series).

== Early life and career ==
Thibaut began making movies at age eight with a super 8 camera. He studied animation at the AAA (Annecy Animation Association), leaving his hometown to study at The University of California, San Diego. Thibaut eschewed the film school route, and created a VFX company Explorer Films in Paris, worked on a multitude of TV commercials, including Jan Kounen's Dobermann (film) with Vincent Cassel and Monica Bellucci amongst others.

In 2000, Thibaut ends his career as a director of photography and begins work as film director after serving as a second unit DP on Doug Liman’s Blockbuster The Bourne Identity (principal photography by Oliver Wood and Don Burgess.

After his second short film South, the story of a musician with his home studio build in a huge tree, the original soundtrack composed by Philippe Cohen Solal, leader of Gotan Project, Thibaut started to direct commercial with a first Armani project in 2001 for Partizan Entertainment and l’Oréal luxury division.

He joined Ridley Scott Associates, which represent him in the commercial international market from 2011 to 2019.

Jean-Claude Thibaut founded Armored Pictures, a director-driven production company based in LA, NYC and Paris.

== Armored ==
Set on a directing career, Thibaut formed a creative production company Armored in Paris and LA and started off directing documentary, branded content film, music video and TV commercials for Louis Vuitton, Dior, Hermes, Lanvin, Rick Owens, Vogue Italia, Miu Miu, Dolce & Gabbana and Armani. In 2010, Thibaut produced a series of fashion films: Megan Fox's The Tip and Cristiano Ronaldo's Housekeeping directed by Johan Renck for Armani Jeans with a first 5 million views in a week. The films were released in Cinema worldwide. Thibaut took a new direction with storytelling with the co-production of For Lovers Only directed by Michael Polish.

== Filmography ==
=== Short films ===
- Lethal Wings (1994) - Director
- South (2001) - Director
- Anytime Soon (2010) - Director
- Two Missing Hourds (2020) - Director

=== Feature films ===
- For Lovers Only (2010) - Producer
- Brainious (2018) - Co-producer

=== Fashion Films ===
- Megan Fox's "The Tip" (2011) - Producer
- '"When L.A. is a Man" for Louis Vuitton (2012) - Director
- "When Hong Kong is a Woman" for Louis Vuitton (2012) - Director

== Awards and nominations ==
Award	Year	Category	Title	Result
Societe Auteur et Compositeur Dramatique	2002	Best Script	Mr. Kellar	Won
Philips Morris Award	1994	400 Copies in Theater	Lethal Wings	Won
Bronze Excellence in Branded Content Award	2012	Branded Content	The Peninsula Hotels Campaign Peninsula Moments	Won
