= The Declaration of Independent Filmmaking =

2005 nonfiction book

- Author: Mark Polish, Michael Polish, Jonathan Sheldon
- Language: English
- Genre: Non-fiction
- Publisher: Mariner Books
- Publication date: 2005
- ISBN: 978-0-15-602952-0

The Declaration of Independent Filmmaking (subtitle: An Insider's Guide to Making Movies Outside of Hollywood) is a 2005 non-fiction book by Mark Polish, Michael Polish, and Jonathan Sheldon. Presented as a how-to guide for first time filmmakers, The Declaration details how The Polish brothers made their first three independent films (Twin Falls Idaho, Jackpot, Northfork) and their subsequent experiences in Hollywood selling their films and going to film festivals to promote them. The book was published by Mariner Books, ISBN 978-0-15-602952-0.
