= Logan Polish =

American actress (born 2001)

- Born: 2001 (age 24–25); Los Angeles, California
- Occupation: Actress
- Years active: 2006–present

Logan Polish (born 2001) is an American actress. She is best known for playing Dina Fox in the drama series The Mosquito Coast and Tiger in the horror film Murmur.

== Early life ==
Polish was born in Los Angeles, California on February 13 2001. She is the daughter of actor and director Mark Polish. She is the niece of the actress Kate Bosworth. After appearing in a few family projects she was approached in 2015 at a concert by her future agent. She then told her father that acting was her future.

== Career ==
Polish made her on-screen debut at the age of 4 in The Astronaut Farmer starring Billy Bob Thornton and Virginia Madsen which was co-written by her father Mark Polish and directed by her uncle Michael Polish. In 2019 she directed and starred in her directional debut in the sci-fi short film Margot starring Jackson Pace, Colin Ford and Jack Kilmer. She went on to win the best emerging filmmaker at the Tallgrass Film Festival She was once again directed by her father in the horror film Murmur where she played Tiger. She is best known for playing Dina Fox in the drama series The Mosquito Coast.

== Filmography ==
=== Film ===
Year	Title	Role	Notes
2006	The Astronaut Farmer	Sunshine Farmer	
2011	For Lovers Only	Yves' Daughter	
2015	Once	Girl	Short
2015	Primrose Lane	Hannah	Short
2018	Spectres	Darian	Short
2018	Morreale Paris - Renaissance	Girl	Short
2019	Against the Clock	Sophie Forde	
2019	The Follower	Sophie	Short
2019	Margot	Margot	Short
2022	Murmur	Tiger	
2025	The Dream Machine	Girl	Short
2026	There There		

=== Television ===
Year	Title	Role	Notes
2021-2023	The Mosquito Coast	Dina Fox	17 episodes
