= Sean King O'Grady =

American film director and producer

Sean King O'Grady is an American film director and producer based in Michigan. He made his feature directorial debut with We Need to Do Something (2021). He then made his second feature directorial effort with The Mill (2023). O'Grady also served as a producer of the 2022 film I Love My Dad and the 2024 film Mr. Crocket.

As of October 2024, O'Grady resides in Oakland County, Michigan.

== Select filmography ==
=== As director ===
- We Need to Do Something (2021)
- The Mill (2023)

=== As producer ===
- For Lovers Only (2011)
- In a World... (2013; executive producer)
- Big Sur (2013; co-producer)
- The Assistant (2019; executive producer)
- Dinner in America (2020; executive producer)
- I Love My Dad (2022)
- The Listener (2022)
- The Mill (2023)
- Mr. Crocket (2024)
- Haunted Heist (2025)
