= Haunted Heist =

- Theatrical release poster
- Directed by: Lil Rel Howery
- Written by: Carl Reid
- Produced by: Lil Rel Howery; Josh Feldman; Sean King O'Grady; Feras Majid Shammami; Jesse Ford
- Starring: Lil Rel Howery; Tiffany Haddish
- Cinematography: James McMillan
- Edited by: Shane Patrick Ford
- Music by: Truth
- Production companies: Death Ground; Robinwood7; The Coven
- Distributed by: Saban Films; Sony Pictures (Home video)
- Release dates: September 20, 2025 (Fantastic Fest); July 24, 2026 (United States)
- Running time: 87 minutes
- Country: United States
- Language: English
- Box office: $502,121

Haunted Heist is a 2026 American comedy horror film written by Carl Reid, directed by Lil Rel Howery and starring Howery and Tiffany Haddish. It is Howery's directorial debut.

== Cast ==
- Lil Rel Howery
- Tiffany Haddish
- King Bach
- Karlous Miller
- Brett Gelman
- Ari Dayan
- Tony Baker
- Tara Terry
- Stephen Blackwell as Jared

== Production ==
In November 2024, it was announced that Howery and Haddish were cast in the film. In March 2025, it was announced that several other actors, including Gelman, were cast in the film.

In May 2025, it was announced that production on the film wrapped in Detroit.

== Release ==
The film premiered at Fantastic Fest on September 20, 2025. It was released in the United States by Saban Films on July 24, 2026.

== Reception ==
Trace Thurman of Bloody Disgusting gave the film a negative review and awarded the film one and a half “skulls” out of five.
