= The Astronaut Farmer =

- Theatrical release poster
- Directed by: Michael Polish
- Written by: Mark Polish; Michael Polish
- Produced by: Len Amato; Mark Polish; Michael Polish; Paula Weinstein
- Starring: Billy Bob Thornton; Virginia Madsen; Bruce Dern; Tim Blake Nelson
- Cinematography: M. David Mullen
- Edited by: James Haygood
- Music by: Stuart Matthewman
- Production companies: Polish Brothers Construction; Spring Creek Pictures
- Distributed by: Warner Bros. Pictures
- Release dates: October 15, 2006 (Mill Valley Film Festival); February 23, 2007 (United States)
- Running time: 104 minutes
- Country: United States
- Language: English
- Budget: $13 million
- Box office: $11.1 million

The Astronaut Farmer is a 2006 American drama film directed by Michael Polish, who co-wrote the screenplay with his brother Mark Polish. The film stars Billy Bob Thornton, Virginia Madsen, Bruce Dern and Max Thieriot. The plot is about a Texas rancher who attempts to construct a rocket in his barn and launch himself into outer space.

The film premiered at the Mill Valley Film Festival on October 15, 2006 and was released by Warner Bros. Pictures on February 23, 2007. It grossed $11.1 million against its $13 million budget, and received mixed reviews from critics.

== Plot ==
Charles Farmer is a former United States Air Force fighter pilot and astronaut-in-training who reluctantly resigned from the space program and was discharged from the military before he could fulfill his dream of becoming a vital part of NASA. He did so in order to take over his family's failing ranch in Texas after his financially strapped father's suicide prior to the ranch being foreclosed on.

Having missed the opportunity to travel into space, he decides to build a working replica of the historic Mercury-Atlas rocket and spacecraft in the barn on his secluded ranch in the fictional town of Story, Texas, using all his assets and facing his own foreclosure of the ranch as a result. But he has done so with the ongoing support of his wife Audrey, his teenage son Shepard, and young daughters Stanley and Sunshine. When he begins making inquiries about purchasing rocket fuel, the FBI and FAA step in to investigate, and the ensuing publicity thrusts Farmer into the spotlight and makes him a media darling.

Farmer's launch is delayed by endless red tape created by U.S. government officials from the FAA, FBI, CIA, NASA and the Department of Defense, who seek to stall him beyond his deadline and force his creditors to foreclose on the farm. Farmer was counting on publicity to help him financially. He is denied the hydrazine fuel he requires, with government officials claiming he is a security risk and that it is too dangerous to allow a private citizen to launch a space vehicle. Facing financial ruin, he panics, climbs aboard, and, using a less-than-optimal substitute fuel, somehow launches the rocket. However, after only a foot or two of vertical lift, the rocket descends back down, falls over, and horizontally blasts out of the old wooden barn where it was constructed.

Farmer nearly dies from head trauma and other injuries after his capsule is thrown from the rocket. News media, spectators and all their vehicles are nearly crushed in the process. During the months he spends recuperating, public interest in his project wanes, and while he recovers slowly, he is depressed at the failure of the project and of his dream.

An inheritance from her father, Hal, is unexpectedly left to Audrey after his death, which allows them to bring their debts current. Audrey, realizing how much Charles' dream means to the entire family, encourages Charles to construct another rocket, financing it with the rest of her inheritance. He is able to do so in relative privacy.

Using a ruse to distract snooping government officials, Charles succeeds in launching the rocket The Dreamer, while the FAA claims no such thing has occurred. As the rocket rises out of the barn, the locals and law enforcement authorities in the area are amazed to watch it rise into space. After orbiting Earth nine times and suffering a brief period of a communication blackout, Charles returns safely and is given a hero's welcome home, appearing on The Tonight Show with Jay Leno and as seen in still photos shown during the end credits, while playing Elton John's "Rocket Man".

== Cast ==
- Billy Bob Thornton as Charles Farmer
- Virginia Madsen as Audrey "Audie" Farmer
- Max Thieriot as Shepard Farmer
- Jasper Polish as Stanley Farmer
- Logan Polish as Sunshine Farmer
- Bruce Willis as Colonel Doug Masterson, USAF (uncredited)
- Bruce Dern as Hal
- Mark Polish as FBI Agent Mathis
- Jon Gries as FBI Agent Killbourne
- Tim Blake Nelson as Kevin Munchak
- Sal Lopez as Pepe Garcia
- J. K. Simmons as FAA Administrator Jacobson
- Kiersten Warren as Phyllis
- Rick Overton as Arnold "Arnie" Millard
- Richard Edson as Sheriff "Chopper" Miller
- Elise Eberle as Madison Roberts
- Julie White as Beth Goode
- Graham Beckel as Frank
- Jay Leno as himself
- Marshall Bell as Judge Miller
- Kathleen Arc as Mrs. Harder
- Kathy Lamkin as Jodie
- Gary Houston as Dr. Livingston

== Production ==
In How to Build a Rocket: The Making of The Astronaut Farmer, a bonus feature on the DVD release of the film, screenwriters Michael and Mark Polish reveal they used their father as a role model for the character of Charles Farmer.

The space suit worn by Farmer is a replica of the Mercury-era Navy Mark IV pressure suit worn by all Mercury Seven astronauts prior to Mercury-Atlas 9. Additionally, the rocket featured in the film is a nearly scale replica of the Mercury-Atlas that launched America's first astronauts into orbit.

The film's soundtrack includes "Rocket Man" by Elton John, "Luckenbach, Texas (Back to the Basics of Love)" by Waylon Jennings, "(Hey Baby) Que Paso" by Texas Tornados, "John Saw That Number" by Neko Case, "Stop the World (And Let Me Off)" by Dwight Yoakam, "Before the Next Teardrop Falls" by Freddy Fender, "List of Reasons" by Dale Watson, "I Made a Lover's Prayer" by Gillian Welch.

The film premiered at the 2006 Mill Valley Film Festival. Its February 23, 2007 theatrical release in the United States was three days after the 45th anniversary of the country's first orbital mission, Friendship 7, piloted by John Glenn.

When Thornton's character is being interviewed by Jay Leno during the closing credits, the studio audience members are not extras but the actual audience from that day's filming of The Tonight Show with Jay Leno.

== Reception ==
Review aggregation website Rotten Tomatoes assigned the film an approval rating of 59% based on 135 reviews, with an average rating of 5.97/10. The site's critics consensus states: "The Astronaut Farmer is a charming, inspirational drama that successfully avoids modern cinematic cliches while appealing to the optimistic dreamer in all of us." Metacritic gives the film a weighted average score of 55 out of 100, based on 28 critics, indicating "mixed or average reviews". Audiences polled by CinemaScore gave the film an average grade of "B+" on an A+ to F scale.

A.O. Scott of the New York Times called the film "a disarmingly sincere follow-your-dreams fable" and added, "The tone of the film . . . is wide-eyed and unapologetically sentimental . . . With another actor in the title role . . . the mawkishness would be unbearable, but Mr. Thornton can be relied upon for understated dignity accompanied by an intriguing undertone of serious craziness . . . The Polish brothers, in earlier films like Twin Falls Idaho and Northfork, have always placed wonderment above storytelling, and the availability of big stars and a reasonable special-effects budget has not entirely blunted their taste for odd, resonant images. The opening shots, of Farmer on horseback in his space suit, hint at a strangeness that the rest of the movie never quite lives up to, but it does have a visual freshness that makes the bromides and clichés palatable."

Kevin Crust of the Los Angeles Times observed, "There's something old-fashioned about The Astronaut Farmer that's so conventional it feels unconventional. It follows the paradigm of inspirational movies so perfectly that even the smallest deviation seems rebellious. The movie's orthodoxy is precisely what allows us to take such pleasure in its irregularities . . . With this movie, the [Polish] brothers have been given a giant coloring book. While both write and produce, Mark directs and Michael acts . . . and for the most part, they attempt to stay within the lines. But it's in the few moments when they go outside those lines that the movie momentarily soars."

Ruthe Stein of the San Francisco Chronicle called the film " exemplary family-friendly entertainment" and added, "[I]n less artistic hands, [it] could easily spin into cliche. Michael and Mark Polish . . . avoid triteness by sheer force of imagination. The small Texas town where Charles Farmer . . . handcrafts a rocket in his barn one valve at a time is presented as both familiar and otherworldly, part Norman Rockwell, part Twilight Zone . . . The brothers are following a path set by David Lynch, the king of weird, who ventured into wholesome territory with The Straight Story and came up with something profound in its simplicity . . . The Polishes set up a classic David and Goliath situation, leaving no question of whom the audience will root for. There are sufficient surprises along the way, so the ending is far from predictable. The Astronaut Farmer's goofy quality makes it totally endearing. It's also super entertaining."

Steve Dollar of the New York Sun said, "Even for a comedy with dramatic drive, The Astronaut Farmer demands that the audience suspend its disbelief on multiple fronts . . . What is believable, however, is the passion of Billy Bob. He genuinely makes all the tearjerker, hug-a-munchkin family stuff resonate. Maybe it takes an actress as sensual and earthy as Ms. Madsen to match Mr. Thornton in emotional honesty, but their grown-up dynamic is what keeps the movie from drifting out of orbit."

== Home media ==
The film was released on DVD on July 10, 2007.

== See also ==
- List of American films of 2006
- SpaceShipOne
- Private spaceflight
- Brian Walker
- Salvage 1
- "Trends" (short story)
- Mike Hughes (daredevil)
