= M. David Mullen =

American cinematographer

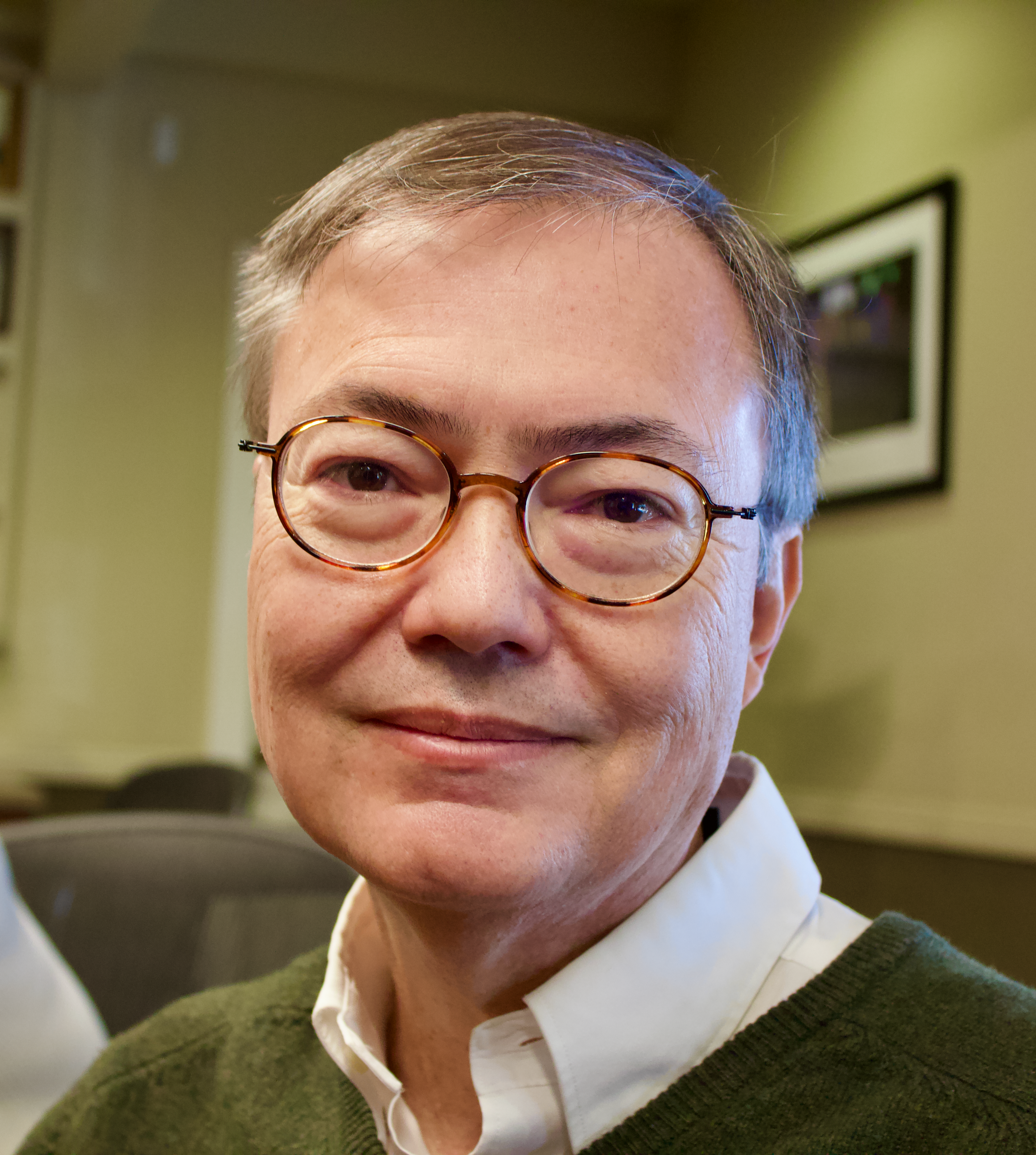
- Mullen in 2023
- Born: Merritt David Mullen III; 26 June 1962 (age 64); Iwakuni, Yamaguchi-ken, Japan
- Occupation: Cinematographer
- Awards: Dublin International Film Festival Award for Best Cinematography; 2016 The Love Witch

M. David Mullen, A.S.C. (born Meritt David Mullen III; 26 June 1962) is an American cinematographer known for his work on Twin Falls Idaho, Northfork, Akeelah and the Bee, The Astronaut Farmer, Jennifer's Body, and The Love Witch, as well as for his contributions to numerous television series, including The Marvelous Mrs. Maisel, for which he won an Emmy Award three times as well an ASC Award twice. He frequently collaborates with The Polish brothers.

Mullen pursued his undergraduate education at the University of California, Los Angeles, where he received his BA in English Literature. While an undergrad, he had acquired technical knowledge of cinematography from utilizing the UCLA film library. In addition to this, he would serve a cinematographer on the student films of his friends that were attending USC film school around the time he was attending UCLA. At the age of 27, he enrolled in the film program at the California Institute of the Arts from 1988 to 1991, where he focused on cinematography. During this time, he was mentored by Krzysztof Malkiewicz. Years later, their collaboration led to their joint effort on Cinematography (Third Edition), a comprehensive guidebook on film production techniques. He also co-edited the 11th Edition of the American Cinematographer Manual.

In the spring of 2004, Mullen attained membership in the American Society of Cinematographers—an esteemed accolade within the cinematography community. Notably, he received nominations for two Independent Spirit Awards for Best Cinematography: first in 2000 for Twin Falls Idaho, and then in 2004 for Northfork. In 2017, he was honored with the Best Cinematography award for his work on The Love Witch by the Dublin Film Critics' Circle.

== Filmography ==
=== Film ===
- The Face of Horror (2026)
- The Love Witch (2016)
- 90 Minutes in Heaven (2015)
- Big Sur (2012)
- Seven Days in Utopia (2011)
- Stay Cool (2011)
- Jennifer's Body (2009)
- The Smell of Success (2009)
- Assassination of a High School President (2009)
- Mary Pickford: The Muse of the Movies (2008)
- Solstice (2007)
- Akeelah and the Bee (2006)
- The Astronaut Farmer (2006)
- When Do We Eat? (2006)
- Shadowboxer (2005)
- The Quiet (2005)
- Out for Blood (2004)
- New Suit (2002)
- D.E.B.S. (2004)
- Dark Arc (2004) - Additional photography
- A Foreign Affair (2003)
- Northfork (2003)
- Tom's Nu Heaven (2003)
- Infested (2002)
- Stuck (2001)
- Jackpot (2001)
- The Perfect Tenant (2000)
- Ritual (2000)
- Devil in the Flesh 2 (2000)
- Alone With a Stranger (2000)
- Twin Falls Idaho (1999)
- Clean and Narrow (1999)
- Captured (1998)
- The Dentist 2 (1998) - 2nd unit photography
- The Night Caller (1998)
- Soulmates (1997)
- Cupid (1997)
- Man of Her Dreams (1997)
- The Last Big Thing (1996)
- Daddy's Girl (1996)
- Black Scorpion (1995) - 2nd unit photography
- Lipstick Camera (1994)
- The River Bottom (1993)

=== Television ===
- Westworld (2018, 1 episode)
- The Marvelous Mrs. Maisel (2017–2023, 27 episodes)
- Get Shorty (2017, 4 episodes)
- Designated Survivor (2016, 1 episode)
- Extant (2014, 11 episodes)
- Mad Men (2014, 1 episode)
- Smash (2013, 14 episodes)
- Sarah Silverman: We Are Miracles (2013, television special)
- The Chicago Code (2011, 1 episode)
- United States of Tara (2009–11, 32 episodes)
- The Good Wife (2009, 1 episode)
- Big Love (2007, 9 episodes)
