= Karen Obilom =

American actress

Karen Obilom is an American actress. She is known for portraying Nia Bullock in the BET television series Games People Play (2019–2021). She also appeared opposite Lil Rel Howery in the 2023 film The Mill (2023).

Obilom is from Texas and is of Nigerian descent.

== Filmography ==
=== Film ===
Year	Title	Role	Notes
2012	Short Film Princess	Teenage Tiffany	Short
2013	5am	Restaurant Patron	Short
2014	Mr. Student Body President	Tamika Wolfe	Short
2014	Christmas Is in the Air	Mary	Short
2014	Bachelorette Party	Tasha	Short
2015	Short Change Hero	Fast Food Manager	Short
2016	Nutcracker	Randi	Short
2017	Neva~eh	Angelic Sorcoress	Short
2018	Congo Cabaret	Myrtle	Short
2018	Rukky	Rukevwe 'Rukky' Odafe	Short
2018	Further Away	Diana	Short
2019	Sirens	Monica	
2021	Show Me What You Got	Niki	
2021	Resort to Love	Janelle Stratford	
2023	House Party	Venus	
2023	Out of Bounds	Moriah	
2023	The Mill	Kate	
2025	The Late Night Creep	Heather	
2025	Food for the Soul	Ada	Short
2026	Doing Life	Trina	

=== Television ===
Year	Title	Role	Notes
2015–16	Rider	Jessica	Recurring Cast
2016	Comedy Bang! Bang!	Queen Bee	Episode: "Tony Hale Wears a Blue Flannel Shirt and Fuchsia Sneakers"
2016	The Coroner: I Speak for the Dead	Stefanie McDuffey	Episode: "Rigor Mortis"
2016	Hello Cupid Reboot	Bj	Recurring Cast
2017	NCIS: Los Angeles	Joy	Episode: "Unleashed"
2017	Chef Julian	Herself	Episode: "Episode #3.2" & "#3.8"
2016–18	Mr. Student Body President	Tamika Wolf	Recurring Cast: Season 1 & 3, Guest: Season 2
2018	Insecure	Antoinette	Episode: "Backwards-Like"
2018	NCIS: New Orleans	Zaire Dupre	Episode: "Pound of Flesh"
2018	The Vampyr Resistance Corps	Demetria	Main Cast
2018	Medal of Honor	Mildred	Episode: "Edward Carter"
2019–21	Games People Play	Nia Bullock	Main Cast
2020–21	Doom Patrol	Roni Evers	Recurring cast (season 2–3); 8 episodes
2022	Send Help	Ashley Young	Main Cast
2023	Grey's Anatomy	Tobey Barrett	Recurring Cast: Season 19
2025	Law & Order	Detective Vanessa Washburn	Episode: "Greater Good"
