= Lenore Kandel =

American poet (1932– 2009)

- Kandel holding a copy of The Love Book
- Born: January 14, 1932; New York City, U.S.
- Died: October 18, 2009 (aged 77); San Francisco, California, U.S.
- Education: LA City College, The New School for Social Research
- Occupations: Poet, Activist
- Years active: 1960–1970
- Notable work: The Love Book (1966); Word Alchemy (1967)
- Movement: Beat Generation, Hippie, Diggers (theater)
- Parent: Aben Kandel (Father)

Lenore Kandel (January 14, 1932, New York City – October 18, 2009, San Francisco, California) was an American poet, affiliated with the Beat Generation and Hippie counterculture.

== Biography ==
Although Kandel was born in New York, her family lived in Bucks County, Pennsylvania during her childhood. Afterward, she moved to Los Angeles to live with her father, screenwriter Aben Kandel. Her brother, prolific screenwriter Stephen Kandel, was best known for co-creating Harry Mudd, a prominent recurring Star Trek character.

She returned to New York to attend The New School for Social Research on scholarship for three and a half years before she dropped out. She moved to San Francisco in 1960. She began living in the East-West House co-op, where she met Jack Kerouac, who later immortalized her as Romana Swartz, "a big Rumanian monster beauty", in his novel Big Sur (1962). In the novel, she is described as being the girlfriend of Dave Wain, who was based on Lew Welch. "Dave" describes how she walked around the "Zen-East House" (East-West House) wearing only purple panties. Kerouac described her as "intelligent, well read, writes poetry, is a Zen student, knows everything [...]" (Big Sur, p. 75).

Her first works of poetry were the chapbooks An Exquisite Navel, A Passing Dragon, and A Passing Dragon Seen Again, published in 1959. Several of her poems also appeared in Beat and Beatific II in 1959.

Kandel was briefly notorious as the author of a short book of poetry, The Love Book. A small pamphlet consisting of four poems, The Love Book provoked censorship with its three-part poem, "To Fuck with Love." Police seized the work as being in violation of state obscenity codes, from both City Lights Books and "The Psychedelic Shop" in 1966. Subsequently, Kandel gained cause célèbre status. She herself defended her verse as "holy erotica." A jury declared the book obscene and lacking in any redeeming social value in 1967 and sales increased; Kandel thanked the police by giving one percent of all profits to the Police Retirement Association. The decision was overturned on appeal and the book continued to sell well.

In 1964, she participated in The Berkeley Poetry Conference organized by Richard Baker, Program Coordinator, University of California Berkeley, Liberal Arts Extension, along with poets Robert Duncan, Charles Olson, Allen Ginsberg, Bob Creeley, and many others. Kandel was a speaker at the Human Be-In in the Golden Gate Park polo fields on January 14, 1967. The only woman to speak from the stage, Kandel defiantly read from The Love Book. It was her 35th birthday, and McClure later stated, "The entire crowd of 20,000 or 30,000 people sang 'Happy Birthday' to her."

Kandel published her only full-length book of poems, Word Alchemy, in 1967. She was one of 15 people interviewed in Voices from the Love Generation (Little, Brown and Company, 1968). In 1976, Kandel recited a poem at the iconic concert The Last Waltz performed by The Band (but was not included in the film or soundtrack).

In 1970, Kandel suffered massive spinal injuries in a motorcycle crash with her then-husband Billy "Sweet Wiliam" Fritsch (poet, stevedore, and member of the Diggers (theater) and Hells Angels). Despite having to cope with excruciating pain for the remainder of her life, she continued to write and maintain social ties.

She died at home on October 18, 2009, of complications from lung cancer, with which she had been diagnosed several weeks earlier.

In 2012, Collected Poems of Lenore Kandel was published. It features 80 of her poems, many of which had never before been published.

== Film and music ==
Kandel appears in the Digger film Nowsreal (1968), sewing a Hells Angel patch on William Fritsch's jacket.

Kandel appears in the Kenneth Anger film Invocation of My Demon Brother (1969), with William Fritsch, smoking a marijuana cigarette contained in a miniature skull.

In the 2013 film Big Sur, Kandel is portrayed by Stana Katic.

== Selected works ==
=== By Lenore Kandel ===
- Lenore Kandel, Collected Poems of Lenore Kandel, North Atlantic Books, 2012, ISBN 1583943722, ISBN 978-1583943724
- Limited edition of The Love Book published by Joe Pachinko of Superstition Street Press in 2003, ISBN 0-9665313-1-0
- Lenore Kandel, Word Alchemy, Grove Press, Evergreen trade paperback, 1967, ISBN 1-299-22275-7
- Lenore Kandel, The Love Book, Stolen Paper Review, San Francisco, 1966, paperbound, 8 pages
- Lenore Kandel, An Exquisite Navel, Three Penny Press, Studio City, 1959.
- Lenore Kandel, A Passing Dragon, Three Penny Press, Studio City, 1959?.
- Lenore Kandel, A Passing Dragon See Again, Three Penny Press, Studio City, 1959.

=== Anthologies featuring Kandel's work ===
- Anne Waldman (ed.), The Beat Book: Writings from the Beat Generation (Shambhala, 2007)
- Jenny Skerl (ed.), Reconstructing the Beats (Palgrave Macmillan, 2004), Ronna C. Johnson, chapter 6, contains an essay about Kandel and selections from her poems
- Carmela Ciuraru (ed.), Beat Poets (Everyman's Library, 2002)
- Alan Kaufman and S.A. Griffin (ed.), The Outlaw Bible of American Poetry (Basic Books, 1999)
- Richard Peabody (ed.), A Different Beat: Writings by Women of the Beat Generation (Serpents Tail, 1997), pp 100–103
- Brenda Knight, Women of the Beat Generation (Conari Press, 1996) contains a biographical portrait of Kandel, as well as three of her poems
- Carole Tonkinson (ed.), Big Sky Mind: Buddhism and the Beat Generation (Riverhead Books, 1995), pp 260–272.
- David Steinberg (ed.), The Erotic Impulse (Tarcher, 1992) contains "Seven of Velvet," which is not available in other collections
- Leonard Wolf (ed.), in collaboration with Deborah Wolf, Voices from the Love Generation (Little, Brown and Company, 1968) hardcover, 283 pages, interviews done in Haight-Ashbury
