= Northfork =

2003 film

- Theatrical release poster
- Directed by: Michael Polish
- Written by: Mark Polish; Michael Polish
- Produced by: Mark Polish; Michael Polish
- Starring: Peter Coyote; Anthony Edwards; Claire Forlani; Daryl Hannah; Kyle MacLachlan; Nick Nolte; Mark Polish; James Woods
- Cinematography: M. David Mullen
- Edited by: Leo Trombetta
- Music by: Stuart Matthewman
- Distributed by: Paramount Classics
- Release dates: January 21, 2003 (Sundance); July 11, 2003 (United States)
- Running time: 103 minutes
- Language: English
- Budget: $1.9 million
- Box office: $1.6 million

Northfork is a 2003 fantasy drama film directed by Michael Polish and written by Michael and Mark Polish. It premiered at the Sundance Film Festival on January 21, 2003 and later received a limited release in the United States on July 11, 2003. The film stars Duel Farnes, James Woods, Nick Nolte, Michele Hicks, Daryl Hannah, Anthony Edwards, Robin Sachs, Ben Foster, Claire Forlani, Clark Gregg, Kyle MacLachlan and Peter Coyote. This is the brothers' third film collaboration, after Twin Falls Idaho (1999) and Jackpot (2001).

== Plot ==
The film's narrative consists of several interwoven subplots taking place in the town of Northfork, Montana circa 1955. A new dam is being built that will flood the valley of Northfork, and the town is in the midst of an evacuation. The narratives focus on several individuals who, for one reason or another, have yet to evacuate.

Walter O'Brien and his son are on the evacuation team, helping to evacuate the last few inhabitants of Northfork. In return, the government will give them acres of lakeside property if they meet their evacuee quota. Father Harlan is one such individual, who has stayed behind to care for Irwin, a dying orphan too weak to leave town.

While the O'Briens and their co-workers encounter an array of unusual characters, Irwin discovers that he is the "unknown angel" through a suitcase with his angel wings in it and a Bible with an angel's feather telling his family story. He finds himself, in his dreams, a family of angels, with whom he makes a deal to take him a thousand miles away.

== Cast ==
- Peter Coyote as Eddie
- Anthony Edwards as Happy
- Daryl Hannah as Flower Hercules
- Kyle MacLachlan as Mr. Hope
- Nick Nolte as Father Harlan
- Mark Polish as Willis O'Brien
- James Woods as Walter O'Brien
- Duel Farnes as Irwin
- Claire Forlani as Mrs. Hadfield
- Michele Hicks as Mrs. Hope
- Jon Gries as Arnold
- Robin Sachs as Cup of Tea
- Ben Foster as Cod
- Rick Overton as Rudolph
- Douglas Sebern as Mayor
- Josh Barker as Matt
- Clark Gregg as Mr. Hadfield (uncredited)

== Production ==
The script for the film was the first screenplay written by the Polish brothers. The brothers, who grew up in California but spent time on relatives' ranches in Montana, based their script on people and places they had known in their youth.

The film was shot in 24 days. Montana locations included Fort Peck, Choteau, Great Falls, Fort Peck Dam, and Augusta. The film was shot in CinemaScope.

== Reception ==
Northfork received mixed to positive reviews from critics and has a rating of 57% on Rotten Tomatoes based on 103 reviews with an average rating of 6 out of 10. The consensus states "Visually poetic, but may be too dramatically inert for some." The film also has a score of 64 on Metacritic based on 31 reviews.

Roger Ebert awarded the film 4 out of 4 stars and screened it as part of his Ebertfest festival. Ebert wrote, "There has never been a movie quite like 'Northfork,' but if you wanted to put it on a list, you would also include 'Days of Heaven' and 'Wings of Desire.' It has the desolate open spaces of the first, the angels of the second, and the feeling in both of deep sadness and pity. The movie is visionary and elegiac, more a fable than a story, and frame by frame, it looks like a portfolio of spaces so wide, so open, that men must wonder if they have a role beneath such indifferent skies."

A.O. Scott of The New York Times wrote, "Like another pair of filmmaking brothers, Joel and Ethan Coen, Mark and Michael Polish have a taste for odd, half-buried Americana. But their quiet, almost morose sensibility is miles away from the Coens' antic whimsy. At times their slow, deadpan style may remind you of David Lynch, but without the unnerving psychological subtext, the undercurrents of dread, sex and mayhem, that lurk below the surface of Mr. Lynch's pictures." Scott likened the Polish brothers' sensibilities as closer to Wim Wenders.

Patrick Z. McGavin of IndieWire wrote that though the film is underdeveloped narratively, its strength is in its cinematography: "Mullen’s crisp, widescreen frame conjures up a magnificent world of verdant plains and ravishing horizontal lines. His graceful camera hovers and floats around the movie’s ineffable subject, the possessive urge for independence and freedom in violent opposition with the need for community and social innovation." He concluded, "The command and assurance of the Polish brothers is impressive, and this insinuating, fascinating movie has a magnetic, eerie pull."

== Accolades ==
- Athens International Film Festival
  - Winner, City of Athens Award: Michael Polish
- Chlotrudis Awards
  - Nominee, Best Cinematography: M. David Mullen
- Deauville Film Festival
  - Nominee, Grand Special Prize: Michael Polish
- Independent Spirit Awards
  - Nominee, Best Cinematography: M. David Mullen
- Oldenburg Film Festival
  - Winner, German Independence Award Audience Award: Michael Polish

== See also ==
- List of films about angels
