= Murmur (2022 film) =

2022 film directed by Mark Polish

- Directed by: Mark Polish
- Written by: Mark Polish
- Production company: Polaco
- Distributed by: Buffalo 8
- Release dates: September 2022 (Oldenburg Film Festival); October 25, 2024 (digital)
- Running time: 93 minutes
- Country: United States
- Language: English

Murmur is a 2022 fantasy horror film directed by Mark Polish starring Logan Polish, Colin Ford, Johnny Jay Lee, Megan Lee, Cyrus Arnold, Brandon Wilson, Francesca Xuereb, and D. W. Moffett.

Its premiere at the Oldenburg International Film Festival 2022 and had a digital release by Buffalo 8 on October 25, 2024.

== Premise ==
After the launch of an augmented reality app that captures players' vital signs to create a personal horror movie experience with a villain chasing them, a group of digital influencers decide to become test subjects.

== Cast ==
- Logan Polish as Tiger
- Colin Ford as Maze
- Jonathan Charles as Buster (credited as Johnny Jay Lee)
- Megan Lee as Kenzie
- Cyrus Arnold as Angel
- Brandon Wilson as Zach
- Francesca Xuereb as Roxy
- D. W. Moffett

== Reception ==
In his review on The Hollywood Reporter, John Defore rated it as "an unscary horror film for TikTok attention spans (...) the result being that most viewers not addicted to such stuff will find it insufferable from its first moments." On Film Threat, Benjamin Franz rated it 8/10, writing in his review consensus section: "a fantastic blend of found footage and augmented reality".

== See also ==
- List of horror films of 2022
