= Rick Overton =

American actor (born 1954)

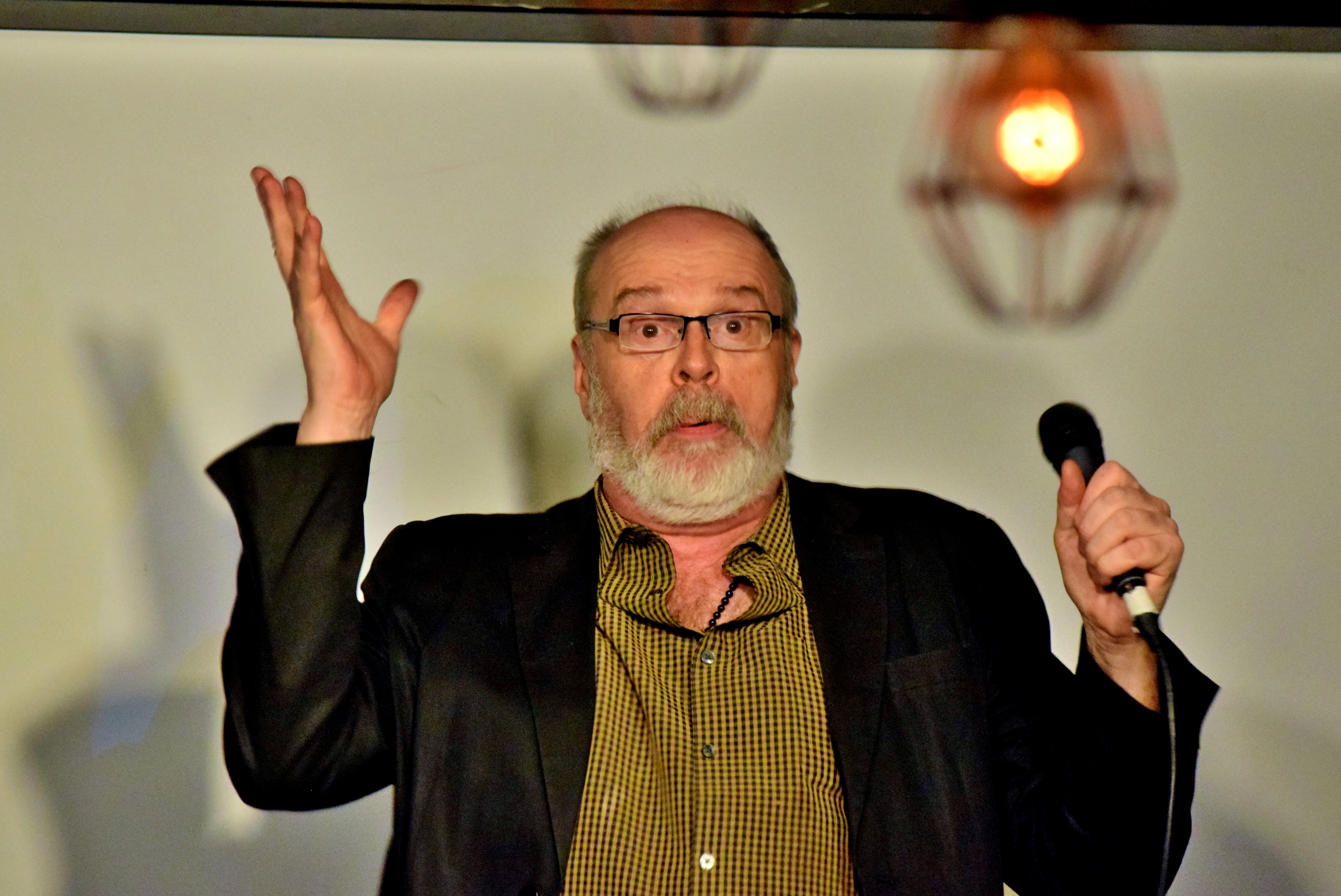
- Overton performing at the Nerdist Showroom in Los Angeles in 2017
- Born: Richard Overton; August 10, 1954 (age 71); Forest Hills, Queens, New York, U.S.
- Occupations: Actor; screenwriter
- Years active: 1982–present

Richard Overton (born August 10, 1954) is an American actor and screenwriter. His writing credits include Dennis Miller Live (1994–2002), for which he received a Primetime Emmy Award, while his acting credits include Gung Ho and Odd Jobs (both 1986), Million Dollar Mystery (1987), Willow (1988), The Rocketeer (1991), Eight Legged Freaks (2002) and Northfork (2003).

== Life and career ==
Overton was born on August 10, 1954, in Forest Hills, Queens, New York, the son of Nancy Overton (née Swain), a singer, and Hall Overton, a teacher and music arranger. He grew up in Englewood, New Jersey, where he attended Dwight Morrow High School.

Overton made his first onscreen appearance performing his standup act in 1981's HBO Presents The 6th Annual Young Comedians. His first movie role was in the 1982 film Young Doctors in Love, followed by a small role in Airplane II: The Sequel later that year. In 1987, he wrote an episode of The New Adventures of Beans Baxter while also appearing in various films and television shows including Willow, Amazing Stories and Million Dollar Mystery.

In 1992, he landed a role in the FOX Network sketch comedy show The Edge. The show ended in 1993. Later that year, Overton appeared in two episodes of Seinfeld and landed a small role in Mrs. Doubtfire. The following year, he won an Emmy for writing an episode of Dennis Miller Live.

In 2005, Overton appeared on Alias and Joan of Arcadia; in the latter he played God explaining to the title character the meaning of real wealth. He also portrayed both H. G. Wells and Orson Welles in a podcast episode of The Radio Adventures of Dr. Floyd that same year.

In 2009, Overton appeared in the film A Fork in the Road alongside Jaime King.

In 2010s, Overton appeared in a General Electric commercial.

== Filmography ==
- Target...Earth? (1980, Documentary) – Himself
- Young Doctors in Love (1982) – Dr. Thurman Flicker
- Airplane II: The Sequel (1982) – Clerk
- Beverly Hills Cop (1984) – Bonded Warehouse Night Supervisor
- Odd Jobs (1986) – Roy
- Gung Ho (1986) – Googie
- A Fine Mess (1986) – Companion
- Modern Girls (1986) – Marsalis
- Million Dollar Mystery (1987) – Stuart Briggs
- Willow (1988) – Franjean
- Traxx (1988) – Frank Williams
- Earth Girls Are Easy (1988) – Dr. Rick
- That's Adequate (1989) – Stand-up Comic
- A Sinful Life (1989) – Janitor
- Blind Fury (1989) – Tector Pike
- The Rocketeer (1991) – South Seas Patron
- Galaxies Are Colliding (1992) – Rex
- Groundhog Day (1993) – Ralph
- Mrs. Doubtfire (1993) – Maitre D'
- The High Crusade (1994) – Sir Roger
- Devil in the Flesh (1998) – Dr. Milletson
- My Giant (1998) – Director
- EDtv (1999) – Barry
- Jackpot (2001) – Roland
- Extreme Honor (2001) – Dr. Lumber
- Shoot or Be Shot (2002) – Sasha
- Eight Legged Freaks (2002) – Deputy Pete Willis
- Northfork (2003) – Rudolph
- Motocross Kids (2004) – Hook
- Serial Killing 4 Dummys (2004) – Mr. Korn
- Off the Lip (2004) – McReady
- Taxi (2004) – Man at Taxi Convention
- Fat Albert (2004) – Coach Gillespie
- Frostbite (2005) – Bartender
- A Lot Like Love (2005) – Tailor
- Keep Your Distance (2005) – Dr. Floyd Beasley
- Popstar (2005) – Mr. Thomas
- Fun with Dick and Jane (2005) – Head Shop Clerk
- Blue Sombrero (2005) – General Hard / Fabio / Major Cajones
- Cloud 9 (2006) – Buckner
- Billy Schulz (2006) – Billy Schulz
- The Last Stand (2006) – Redneck Heckler
- Comedy Hell (2006) – Wayne
- The Tripper (2006) – Mayor Hal Burton
- The Astronaut Farmer (2006) – Arnold 'Arnie' Millard
- National Lampoon's Pledge This! (2006) – Janitor Jones
- Chasing Robert (2007) – Thadeus Wrazinski
- The Metrosexual (2007) – Meter Maid
- A Plumm Summer (2007) – Agent Brinkman
- Totally Baked (2007) – Himself – Street Interview
- Cloverfield (2008) – Frantic Man
- So Long Jimmy (2008) – Dimitri Adams
- The Whole Truth (2009) – Uri Standinoff
- Year One (2009) – Sodom Officer Rick (uncredited)
- The Informant! (2009) – Terry Wilson
- A Fork in the Road (in post-production, 2010) – Sheriff Thompson
- Jelly (Post-Production, 2010) – Tad Wasserstein
- Dinner for Schmucks (2010) – Chuck – Beard Champion
- InSight (2011) – Det. Gehrke
- Bad Teacher (2011) – Philip
- Frogtown (2011) – Steve
- The Babymakers (2012) – Officer Raspler
- Noobz (2012) – Martin Wilson
- A Haunted House 2 (2014) – Professor Wilde
- Such Good People (2014) – Sidney Talmadge
- Muffin Top: A Love Story (2014) – Steve
- Lethal Seduction (2015) – Deacon Williams
- Body High (2015) – Abe
- 30 Years of Dark Seduction (2015) – Himself
- Dave Made a Maze (2017) – Hobo
- Literally, Right Before Aaron (2017) – Dean
- A Futile and Stupid Gesture (2018) – First Publisher
- Duck Duck Goose (2018) – Stanley (voice)

=== Television ===
- HBO Presents The 6th Annual Young Comedians – Himself
- Remington Steele (1 episode, 1983) – New Wave Cop
- Help Wanted: Kids (1986) – Photographer
- Double Switch (1987) – DeeJay
- Amazing Stories (1 episode, 1987) – John Aubrey
- Jonathan Winters: On the Ledge (1987, TV Movie) – Additional Improviser
- Encyclopedia Brown (1 episode, 1989) – Buddy Claggett
- Babes (10 episodes, 1990) – Ronnie Underwood
- Bill and Ted's Excellent Adventures (animated) (1991) – voice of Rufus
- Bill and Ted's Excellent Adventures (live action)'(1992) – Rufus
- The Edge (7 episodes, 1992–1993)
- Seinfeld (2 episodes, 1993) – The Drake
- Attack of the 5 Ft. 2 Women (1994, TV Movie) – Officer Brown
- Lois & Clark: The New Adventures of Superman (2 episodes, 1994–1995) – Victor
- Duckman (1 episode, 1995) – (voice)
- Encino Woman (1996, TV Movie) – Raji
- The Single Guy (2 episodes, 1996) – Carl Gannon / Gannon
- Married... with Children (2 episodes, 1996) – Dr. Fisher
- Ned and Stacey (1 episode, 1997) – Rod
- ER (1 episode, 1997) – Mr. McNamara
- The Weird Al Show (1 episode, 1997) – Mr. Molasses
- Mad About You (2 episodes, 1998) – Earl / Shepherd
- Honey, I Shrunk the Kids: The TV Show (1 episode, 1998) – George
- Ghosts of Fear Street - Fred the Bugman
- It's Like, You Know... (2 episodes, 1999–2001) – Evan / Milosevic
- The Secret Adventures of Jules Verne (5 episodes, 2000) – Count Gregory
- Charmed (3 episodes, 2000) – Triad Member #3
- JAG (1 episode, 2001) – William Markey
- Curb Your Enthusiasm (1 episode, 2001) – Angry Gentile
- Comic Remix (1 episode, 2002)
- My Guide to Becoming a Rock Star (11 episodes, 2002) – Dole Greyson
- NYPD Blue (1 episode, 2002) – Richard Webb
- According to Jim (1 episode, 2004) – Rick
- Six Feet Under (1 episode, 2004) – Thomas Sheedy
- Joan of Arcadia (1 episode, 2004) – Bad Stand-Up Comedian God
- Alias (1 episode, 2005) – Alexei Vasilevich
- Family Plan (2005, TV Movie) – Owens
- Lost (1 episode, 2005) – Matthew Reed
- Van Stone: Tour of Duty (2006, TV Movie) – Gary Seibert's Dad
- Rodney (1 episode, 2006) – Max
- Drive (1 episode, 2007) – Bank Manager
- Leverage (3 episodes, 2008–2009) – Taggert / FBI Agent Taggert
- The Office (2 episodes, 2009) – William Beesly
- True Jackson, VP (1 episode, 2010) – Jimmy's Dad
- The George Lucas Talk Show (1 episode, 2020) – Self
- Secret Level (1 episode, 2024) – Dr. Light

=== Video game ===
- The Incredible Hulk: Ultimate Destruction (2005)

=== Writer ===
- An Evening at the Improv (1 episode, 1983)
- The New Adventures of Beans Baxter (1 episode, 1987)
- Dennis Miller Live (Unknown episodes, 1994)

== Awards and nominations ==
Emmy Awards

- Nominated: Outstanding Writing for a Variety or Music Program, Dennis Miller Live (1997)
- Won: Outstanding Individual Achievement in Writing for a Variety or Music Program, Dennis Miller Live (1996)

Writers Guild of America Award

- Nominated: Comedy/Variety (Including Talk) – Series, Dennis Miller Live (1997)
