= The Mill (2023 film) =

2023 film by Sean King O'Grady

- Promotional release poster
- Directed by: Sean King O'Grady
- Written by: Jeffrey David Thomas
- Produced by: Lil Rel Howery; Josh Feldman; Sean King O'Grady; Jesse Ford; Barbara Goldner; Brooke Goldner
- Starring: Lil Rel Howery; Pat Healy; Karen Obilom; Patrick Fischler
- Cinematography: Seamus Tierney
- Edited by: Shane Patrick Ford
- Music by: David Chapdelaine
- Production companies: 20th Digital Studio; Hulu Originals; Altar Rock Pictures
- Distributed by: Hulu
- Release date: October 9, 2023
- Running time: 106 minutes
- Country: United States
- Language: English

The Mill is a 2023 American science fiction thriller film directed by Sean King O'Grady and written by Jeffrey David Thomas. It stars Lil Rel Howery, Pat Healy, Karen Obilom, and Patrick Fischler. It began streaming on Hulu on October 9, 2023.

== Plot ==
Joe, an employee of the Mallard Corporation, wakes up in a strange courtyard with no recollection of his arrival. As Joe seeks help, he hears the voice of another inmate who explains some — but not all — of the circumstances of the prisoners ("employees"). Any attempts to escape or ask for help during food deliveries results in further isolation. Joe and the other employees' primary task is pushing a millstone in order to reach the targeted quota. He faces the daily pressure of meeting the deadline, and failure carries severe consequences.

Over time, Joe's physical and mental strength are continuously tested. Despite exhaustion and distressing hallucinations, he remains determined to reunite with his pregnant wife, Kate. Joe confronts the malevolent AI orchestrating his ordeal, making a plea for freedom and reuniting with his wife. The AI, now threatened, concedes to his request.

It turns out that Joe has been part of an augmented reality as part of Mallard's training. After he secures his position and reassures contact with Kate, Joe then plots to expose Mallard's wrongdoings.

== Cast ==
- Lil Rel Howery as Joe
- Pat Healy as a guard
- Karen Obilom as Kate
- Patrick Fischler as a neighbor

== Production ==
In February 2023, Deadline Hollywood reported that the film was "recently-wrapped" and was shot in New Jersey.

O'Grady and Howery had previously worked together in the comedy film I Love My Dad (2022), in which the former produced and the latter played a supporting role. In an interview with MovieWeb, O'Grady said that he wanted to collaborate with Howery again but in a drama film rather than a comedy. Upon reading the screenplay of The Mill, O'Grady had Howery in mind as his first choice for the lead. O'Grady said in an interview with Blavity that he "read (the screenplay) in a night", after producer Josh Feldman shared it with him. O'Grady also said in an interview with Comic Book Resources that the screenplay he read was Jeffrey David Thomas’s first draft.

According to O'Grady, Howery chose not to know where the filming location was set and was literally blindfolded as he entered the set.

== Release ==
The film was released on Hulu on October 9, 2023.

== Reception ==
On the review aggregator website Rotten Tomatoes, 42% of 12 critics' reviews are positive, with an average rating of 6/10.

Nick Allen of RogerEbert.com gave the film a score of two out of four. Tyler Nichols of JoBlo.com gave the film a positive review and wrote, "Unless they're given a theatrical release, Hulu Horror films often miss the mark, so I went into this with very low expectations. Thankfully this provided a smart and poignant thriller that really takes aim at a lot of issues going on in society today". Brandon Yu of The New York Times gave the film a negative review, writing, "The film lacks any well-executed surprises to help it push past one-dimensional satire, and Howery is not strong enough of a dramatic actor to keep a single-setting, single-character film like this consistently engaging".
