= The Mosquito Coast (TV series) =

Apple TV+ television series

- Promotional poster
- Genre: Adventure; Crime thriller; Drama
- Created by: Neil Cross
- Based on: The Mosquito Coast by Paul Theroux
- Developed by: Neil Cross; Tom Bissell
- Starring: Justin Theroux; Melissa George; Logan Polish; Gabriel Bateman; Ian Hart; Ariyon Bakare; Natalia Cordova-Buckley; Daniel Raymont
- Music by: Antonio Pinto
- Country of origin: United States
- Original language: English
- No. of seasons: 2
- No. of episodes: 17

Production
- Executive producers: Paul Theroux; Alan Gasmer; Peter Jaysen; Justin Theroux; Ed McDonnell; Rupert Wyatt; Neil Cross; Mark V. Olsen; Will Scheffer; Stefan Schwartz; Evan Katz
- Producers: Christina M. Fitzgerald; Gideon Yago; Tommy Turtle
- Running time: 39–57 minutes
- Production companies: Mr. Cross; Veritas Entertainment Group; Fremantle North America

Original release
- Network: Apple TV+
- Release: April 30, 2021 – January 6, 2023

The Mosquito Coast is an American drama television series developed by Neil Cross and Tom Bissell based on the novel of the same name by Paul Theroux published in 1981. The series stars Justin Theroux, nephew of Paul, and Melissa George in lead roles, with Logan Polish and Gabriel Bateman rounding out the main cast. Justin Theroux also serves as executive producer of the series, along with Rupert Wyatt who directed the first two episodes.

The first season consists of seven episodes and premiered on Apple TV+ on April 30, 2021, and concluded on June 4, 2021. In June 2021, the series was renewed for a second season consisting of ten episodes. The second season premiered on November 4, 2022, and concluded on January 6, 2023. In January 2023, the series was cancelled after two seasons.

== Premise ==
An idealistic inventor, disgusted with the corruption of the industrial world, uproots his family to Latin America. When the U.S. government tries to catch them, they take a dangerous quest through Mexico to flee from their pursuers and find safety.

== Cast ==
=== Main ===
- Justin Theroux as Allie Fox, an idealistic family man and inventor growing increasingly disillusioned with commercialization in the United States.
- Melissa George as Margot Fox, Allie's wife and a former university professor and environmentalist.
- Logan Polish as Dina Fox, Allie and Margot's teenage daughter.
  - Billie Roy portrays a young Dina Fox (guest season 2).
- Gabriel Bateman as Charlie Fox, Allie and Margot's young son.
- Ian Hart as William "Bill" Lee (season 2; recurring season 1), a professional hitman who is hired by Lucrecia to hunt down Allie and is later hired by Guillermo to work as a fixer.
- Ariyon Bakare as Richard Beaumont (season 2), an environmentalist, domestic terrorist and former lover of Margot who he tracks down with the hopes of fulfilling an unknown agenda.
- Natalia Cordova-Buckley as Isela (season 2), the de facto leader of Casa Roja, a remote community of exiles and runaways in the rainforests of Guatemala, and an old friend of Allie.
- Daniel Raymont as Guillermo Bautista (season 2), the drug lord of an influential Central American gang whose dying father owns the land Casa Roja is built on.

=== Recurring ===
- Kimberly Elise as Estelle Jones (season 1), a mysterious government agent tracking Allie and his family.
- James LeGros as Don Voorhees (season 1), an NSA agent and Jones' partner.
- Scotty Tovar as Chuy Padilla (season 1), a coyote who helps smuggle Allie and his family across the Mexico–U.S. Border.
- Ofelia Medina as Lucrecia Salazar (season 1), the vicious matriarch of a powerful Mexican drug cartel.
- Matt McCoy as JJ Raban (season 2), a former high-ranking NSA agent whose career was ruined by Allie.
- Mike Ostroski as Ridley (season 2), an experienced smuggler who brings supplies to Casa Roja.
- Alejandro Akara as Adolfo (season 2), a young smuggler, Ridley's adopted son and Dina's love interest.
- Reed Diamond as Carter Albrecht (season 2), the lead land developer of an urban development project who is working with Andrea to build on the lands where Casa Roja resides.
- Cosima Cabrera as Andrea Bautista (season 2), Guillermo's younger sister, who hopes to sell their family's land to Carter.

=== Guest ===
- Kevin Dunn as Margot's dad. (season 1)
- Kate Burton as Margot's mother. (season 1)
- Emily Chang as Officer V. Chu (season 1), a police officer who has had frequent run-ins with Allie.
- Tommy Martinez as Juan (season 1), Chuy's friend and a coyote in Arizona.
- Bruno Bichir as Enrique Salazar (season 1), the owner of a private estate across the border that serves as a front for a drug cartel.
- Luis de La Rosa as Hugo (season 1), Enrique's young son.
- Alexandre Bar as Patrice (season 1), a French backpacker who befriends Charlie.
- Nicole Rainteau as Tessa (season 1), a British backpacker traveling with Patrice.
- Paterson Joseph as "Calaca" (season 1), the gatekeeper to Casa Roja, a sanctuary for fugitives fleeing from the U.S. government.
- Terry Serpico as Hershey (season 1), a boat salesman in Pichilinque.
- Gustavo Sánchez Parra as Lieutenant A. Flores (season 1), the head of the Pichilinque police department.
- Ritu Lal as Pavani (season 2), Allie's former business partner.
- Will Price as Caleb (season 2), an MIT graduate and computer hacker hired by Guillermo.

== Episodes ==
=== Series overview ===
Season	Episodes	Originally released	
Season	Episodes	First released	Last released
1	7	April 30, 2021	June 4, 2021
2	10	November 4, 2022	January 6, 2023

=== Season 1 (2021) ===
No. overall	No. in season	Title	Directed by	Written by	Original release date
1	1	"Light Out"	Rupert Wyatt	Neil Cross & Tom Bissell	April 30, 2021
Allie Fox lives off the grid in America with his wife Margot and two teenage children, Dina and Charlie, who are both homeschooled outside of the education system. Allie does odd job work for income and is not very successful in selling his inventions for profits. The family has incurred debt and faces the threat of eviction. His wife Margot eventually makes a supposedly risky phone call to her parents and soon the family find themselves tracked down by government agents led by Jones and Voorhees for an unknown reason. Fed up with the constant running, Dina escapes on her own. Margot takes Charlie to safety whilst Allie distracts the agents, who soon search the house extensively. The family meet up at a designated location and Allie learns that Dina has run away on her own. He eventually locates Dina and explains to her that the problem that confronts the family is not the sort that would get resolved by itself over time. The agents then track them down and take Allie into custody. Dina crashes into the police car to free Allie.
2	2	"foxes and coyotes"	Rupert Wyatt	Neil Cross	April 30, 2021
Dina frees Allie from capture and the pair make their way through a homeless community. Allie convinces Dina of his plan to flee America with the family and set up a new life in Mexico. Jones and Voorhees intercept a call Dina makes to Josh. Jones interrogates Dina over the line but she hangs up. Dina and Allie reunite with Margot and Charlie and the couple proceed to steal from Polski before escaping into Arizona. Jones and Voorhees maintain on their trail by interrogating Polski's employees and identifying Hector, who knew Allie. Allie had contacted Hector to reach out to a coyote in Arizona named Juan and convinces him and his friend Chuy to smuggle the family across the border in exchange for helping them break free from their tagging devices through the use of a Faraday cage. The party reach the border before being confronted by three militia members who were alerted about a group of fugitives. A shootout ensues and Juan is killed along with the militia. The family and Chuy continue their journey on foot as their truck is stuck in the sand.
3	3	"Everybody Knows This Is Nowhere"	Jeremy Podeswa	Neil Cross & Ian Scott McCullough	May 7, 2021
Allie, Margot, Dina, Charlie and Chuy continue their trek across the desert. Allie comes up with a plan to reach the nearest town by taking a risky shortcut. He convinces Chuy to link them up with a contact across the border and the group begin their journey. A helicopter search forces the group to run and take cover. Chuy shares with Margot that he has a daughter in Mexico but has been unable to be with her due to his troubles with the cartel. The group take a path through the mountains and come across a grave discovery. Charlie finds a gun and secretly keeps it in his possession. The group continue their journey before having to hide from a group of coyotes traveling on a similar route. Chuy rescues Charlie from a snake whilst they are hiding but gets bitten. The family help a weakening Chuy to a power station where Allie uses electricity to allow Chuy to make a call to his contact across the border. The family are picked up by Chuy's contacts in black Range Rovers.
4	4	"Bus Stop"	Natalia Beristain	Michael D. Fuller	May 14, 2021
Allie and family are taken to an estate run by a man named Enrique. Allie introduces himself as David Richardson and has false identities for all his family members. They settle down and rest for the night. Dina persists in pressing Allie to reveal the truth behind why the family is constantly on the run. Enrique visits the recovering Chuy and the pair dialogue about what to do with the Fox family. It emerges the family are being used for an agenda, and Margot suspects this, prompting Allie to decide they need to leave the estate at the earliest opportunity. He asks Dina to pen a letter to Chuy for help, knowing she has a connection with him. Charlie goes out target hunting with Hugo, a boy from the estate. Aunt Lucrecia arrives at the estate and reveals she wants to trade Allie and the family to free someone of importance to her who is imprisoned in America. As the family is taken captive, Chuy videocalls Lucrecia and holds Hugo at gunpoint, asking for the family to be released. The guards stand off and the family walk out of the estate with Margot deflating the tires of all their vehicles before they leave in a car. They meet Charlie and Chuy in the desert and they drive away to a bus stop where Chuy confronts Allie about his plans for the family before driving away in the car and leaving the Foxes at a bus stop.
5	5	"Elvis, Jesus, Coca-Cola"	Tinge Krishnan	Anya Leta	May 21, 2021
A hitman is shown taking out a target by slitting his throat in calculated fashion. The Fox family arrives in Mexico City after fleeing from the cartel estate and checks into a motel. Lucrecia dials the hitman named Lee and hands him a new assignment with the family as his targets. Allie tells his family that the next part of the plan is to link-up with a past acquaintance of his named Isela, who will provide them with a new place to start afresh. He and Margot head off into the streets in an attempt to locate a man named "Calaca," who might take them to their next destination. Lee enlists the help of street children in learning the family's whereabouts. Dina encourages Charlie to head out on his own to buy food before sneaking out herself and goes to an internet café, still determined to find out what her parents did that has resulted in the family being on the run. She finds out that they are suspects in a kidnapping case. Her activity online puts her back on the grid for the tracking agents Jones and Voorhees. Charlie befriends a backpacker who then takes him to his friends where they get Charlie high. Dina finds her brother and hangs out with the backpackers before leaving with Charlie after getting annoyed at their stereotypical views of America and growing concerned about Charlie beginning to share details about their journey across the border and through the desert with Chuy. Allie and Margot are given the runaround by Calaca before they are eventually led to a market being told it will be the meet-up place. They are pursued by Lee who almost catches up with them before seeing the couple rounded up by a group of men who bundle them into the back of a van.
6	6	"Calaca"	Natalia Beristain	Emmy Grinwis	May 28, 2021
Allie finds himself brought to a compound and brought to meet Calaca. Margot is nowhere to be seen. Lee informs Lucrecia that he was about to track down the couple before they were taken away. She instructs him to continue his pursuit of the children. Agents Jones and Voorhees set up surveillance in the city in hope of locating Dina. Calaca introduces himself as the gatekeeper to a safe sanctuary for fugitives, before beginning to question Allie on his background and why he and his family require a safe haven away from America. Allie sheds some details regarding his NSA background before Calaca begins torturing him to find out what he knows about the sanctuary. Margot is shown to be gagged in a room and Calaca threatens to kill her unless Allie reveals what he knows. Allie pleads that he genuinely has no other intent in trying to reach the sanctuary. Calaca then tells Allie that he has passed the test and Margot is set free. Margot is upset at how little Allie cares for her and the risks he takes with her life. Dina and Charlie go for a meal in the city with Dina growing increasingly suspicious of her and her brother's parentage. She dials Jones for some clarity which allows the agents to locate the family's motel. Allie and Margot return to the room to find the agents with their children, beckoning them to return with them to America as the cartel is on their tail. Lee arrives at the motel and kills Voorhees in a shootout before one of the cartel children slices Jones apart with a knife. The family make use of the commotion to flee from the motel.
7	7	"The Glass Sandwich"	Clare Kilner	Gideon Yago	June 4, 2021
The family continue their journey to a beach by the coast where Allie reiterates his plan to buy a boat and sail upriver and find a place for them to relocate and start afresh. Dina continues to feel uneasy about the family having to go along with her father's plans and confronts him which threatens to divide them. Margot has to step in after Dina and Charlie have a scuffle due to Charlie's continued support for his father. Lee continues his pursuit of the family under the orders of Lucrecia. He assembles a team of henchman to locate the family having gotten information about the campervan they were traveling in. Allie uses one of his contacts to secure a boat for the next phase of their travels. Charlie comes across one of the henchman, Isaias, taking a picture of their campervan. He confronts Isaias with the gun he picked up secretly in the desert and asks him not to send the picture to Lee. Isaias does so anyway and Charlie shoots him, wounding him in the face. The local police chase down Charlie, arrest him and bring him back to the station. Lee finds out that Isaias has succumbed to his injuries. Allie schemes up a plan to release Charlie by using the town's underground drainage system. Margot informs Allie they should contact American authorities to help release Charlie, and that they should then go back to America and send the children to live with her parents. Allie flatly rejects the idea and puts his plan into motion. Margot and Dina create a diversion for the police by setting nearby cars on fire whilst Allie poses as a man who has gotten mugged to enter the police station and subsequently the cell area to release Charlie. Lee and his henchman are hot on their tails. Allie escapes with Charlie via the underground drainage system and reunites with Margot and Dina on a lifeboat before fleeing the town by the river. Allie and his family are then shown to be traveling upriver on the boat he has purchased, heading to a new location for the fresh start that he had promised.

=== Season 2 (2022-23) ===
No. overall	No. in season	Title	Directed by	Written by	Original release date
8	1	"The Damage Done"	Stefan Schwartz	Emmy Grinwis	November 4, 2022
9	2	"Least Concern Species"	Stefan Schwartz	Ian Scott McCullough	November 11, 2022
10	3	"Talk About the Weather"	Metin Hüseyin	George Cornelius	November 18, 2022
11	4	"A Rag, a Bone, a Hank of Hair"	Metin Hüseyin	Anya Leta & Ian Scott McCullough	November 23, 2022
12	5	"Positive, Front-Facing Optics"	Alonso Alvarez	Evan Katz	December 2, 2022
13	6	"Goat Head Taco"	Alonso Alvarez	Natasha Ybarra-Klor and Mark V. Olsen & Will Scheffer	December 9, 2022
14	7	"The Burning of Judas"	Marisol Adler	Ian Scott McCullough and Mark V. Olsen & Will Scheffer	December 16, 2022
15	8	"Dead Totems"	Marisol Adler	Ann Cherkis & Alyson Feltes & Evan Katz and Mark V. Olsen & Will Scheffer	December 23, 2022
16	9	"The Counterfeiters"	Metin Hüseyin	Ann Cherkis & Alyson Feltes & Ian Scott McCullough and Mark V. Olsen & Will Scheffer	December 30, 2022
17	10	"Eulogy"	Metin Hüseyin	Ann Cherkis & Alyson Feltes & Evan Katz and Mark V. Olsen & Will Scheffer	January 6, 2023

== Production ==
=== Development ===
The series was formally given a green light September 16, 2019, with Neil Cross as the show runner and Rupert Wyatt directing the first two episodes and executive producing the series. Cross and Tom Bissell wrote the first episode. On June 2, 2021, Apple TV+ renewed the series for a second season. The series was canceled after two seasons on January 20, 2023.

=== Casting ===
Along with the announcement, Justin Theroux (a nephew of Paul Theroux) was said to star as the main character. On November 4, 2019, it was announced that Melissa George, Gabriel Bateman, and Logan Polish joined the series starring as Theroux's family members in the series. Kimberly Elise joined the project on November 19, 2019. For the second season, Natalia Cordova-Buckley, Ian Hart, and Ariyon Bakare were announced as series regulars on February 16, 2022.

=== Filming ===
Filming for the series began in November 2019 in Los Angeles. Production then shifted to Mexico City only to be canceled due to the COVID-19 pandemic. The series resumed filming October to December in Guadalajara, Zapopan, and Puerto Vallarta. In mid-December, the series filmed in the Riviera Nayarit. On February 1, 2021, in an interview with his cousin Louis Theroux, Justin Theroux revealed he was filming in Guadalajara.

== Release ==
The series premiered on Apple TV+ with its first two episodes on April 30, 2021. The first season consisted of a total of seven episodes, released weekly until June 4, 2021. On June 3, 2021, the series was renewed for a second season.

== Reception ==
On review aggregator Rotten Tomatoes, The Mosquito Coast holds an approval rating of 63% based on 45 reviews, with an average rating of 6.36/10. The website's critics consensus reads, "The Mosquito Coast has suspense to spare, but by burying the best parts of its source material in too many twists it fails to turn into a satisfying series." On Metacritic, which uses a weighted average, the series has a score of 55 out of 100 based on 23 reviews, indicating "mixed or average" reviews.

Nick Allen of RogerEbert.com gave the series a negative review, writing that "the series is far less radical than it posits—especially with plotting that turns a blind eye to the family's inherent advantages—and the tone-deaf tourism of The Mosquito Coast makes for an adventure that's increasingly difficult to go along with."

In a 2023 interview with Deadline Hollywood, the original novel's author Paul Theroux, hoping for a third season that would segue into the events of his novel, praised the series, stating that he was "fascinated" by what the filmmakers had made of his work: "I'm an exec[utive] producer so I was tuned into each episode, but I was still on the edge of my seat wondering what was going to happen. They've done such a great job writing and directing, and the acting is terrific." He also highlighted the beneficial expansion of his story by giving Allie Fox a "plausible backstory", and especially by fleshing out Margot Fox as a "complete" and "believable" character with "reason and accountability".
