= Jon Gries =

American actor and music video director (born 1957)

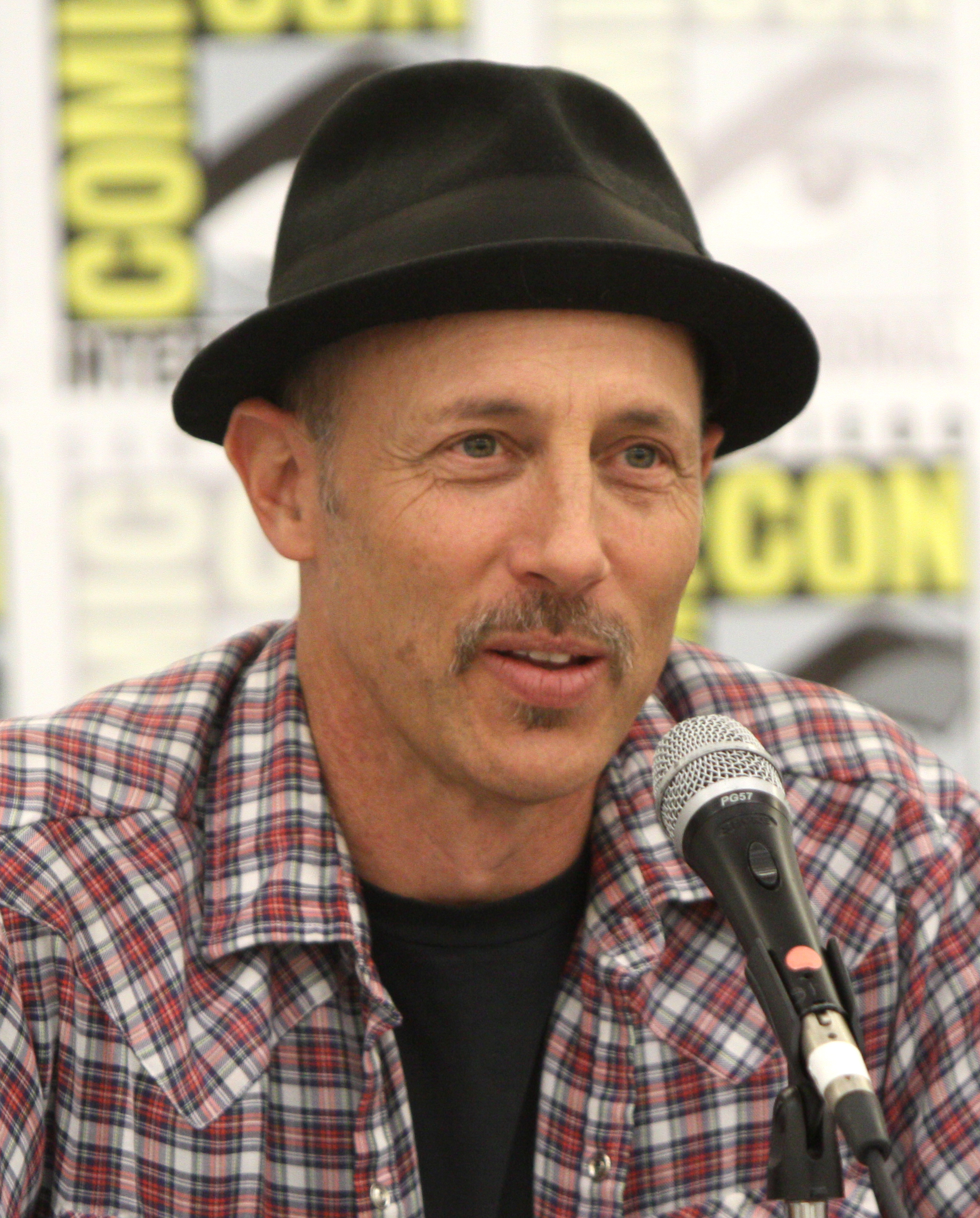
- Gries at the 2011 San Diego Comic-Con
- Born: Jonathan Gries; June 17, 1957 (age 69); Glendale, California, U.S.
- Other name: Jon Francis
- Occupations: Actor; music video director
- Years active: 1968–present

Jonathan Gries (/ɡraɪz/ GRYZ; born June 17, 1957) is an American actor and music video director. He is best known for portraying Uncle Rico in Napoleon Dynamite (2004), for which he was nominated for the Independent Spirit Award for Best Supporting Male; the recurring role of Roger Linus on Lost (2007–2010); and Greg Hunt on The White Lotus (2021–present). He is also known for other film and television credits such as Real Genius (1985), The Monster Squad (1987), Martin (1992–1994), Get Shorty (1995), The Pretender (1996–2000), the Taken trilogy (2008–2014), and Dream Corp LLC (2016–2020).

== Life and career ==
Gries was born in Glendale, California, the son of writer, director, and producer Tom Gries. His first film role came at age 11, when he played the Boy Horace in the Charlton Heston film Will Penny, which was written and directed by his father. Some of his signature roles have come in cult classics. He played Lazlo Hollyfeld in Real Genius (1985), Azzolini in Rainbow Drive, Shawn McDermott in the TV series Martin (1992–1994), Ronnie Wingate in Get Shorty (1995), Harvey in The Rundown, and Uncle Rico in Napoleon Dynamite (2004). Gries has played a werewolf on several occasions, such as Fright Night Part 2 and The Monster Squad.

In the historical Western film September Dawn, he played executed murderer John D. Lee, in a performance praised by critics who otherwise panned the film. He played Casey in the films Taken (2008), Taken 2 (2012), and Taken 3 (2014), and was in TerrorVision, as O.D. He lent his voice for the video game Hitman: Absolution.

Among his television roles are that of a terrorist in season two of the hit show 24 and as Broots on the NBC series The Pretender. He had a guest role on The X-Files in the episode "Sleepless". He played Dylan McKay's drug dealer in season 5 of Beverly Hills, 90210. He played Ben Linus's father Roger in a recurring role on the TV series Lost. He played Shawn on the Fox sitcom Martin during the first two seasons. He appeared twice in the TV series Quantum Leap—first, as a bookie in the episode "The Right Hand of God" and then as a band member in the episode "Glitter Rock". He appeared as Rusty the Bum in two episodes of Seinfeld.

In 2007, he played the menacing dad to Samaire Armstrong in Around June. In 2008, he appeared in the CSI: NY episode "The Box" as the father of that episode's victim. In 2010, he wrapped production on A True Story. Based on Things That Never Actually Happened. ...and Some that Did and appeared in one episode of Nikita. He played Martin in the TV show Supernatural in the episodes "Sam, Interrupted" (2010), "Hello, Cruel World" (2011) and "Citizen Fang" (2012). He played Bob, a former drug addict who operates a safe haven for abused Mexican women, in The Bridge. He played Strabinsky in the TV Show Psych in the episode "One, Maybe Two, Ways Out" (2010).

Gries is a part-owner of the Richmond Flying Mummies, a Northwoods League baseball team that began play in May 2026.

== Filmography ==
=== Film ===
Year	Title	Role	Notes
1968	Will Penny	Horace (Button)	Credited as Jon Francis
1976	Born of Water	Friend	Credited as Jonathan Gries
1977	The Chicken Chronicles	Tom	Credited as Jonathan Gries
1979	Sunnyside	Wild Child	Credited as Jonathan Gries
1979	More American Graffiti	Ron	Credited as Jonathan Gries
1979	Swap Meet	Doug	
1983	Joysticks	King Vidiot	Credited as Jonathan Gries
1985	Real Genius	Lazlo Hollyfeld	Credited as Jonathan Gries
1986	TerrorVision	O.D.	Credited as Jonathan Gries
1986	Running Scared	Det. Tony Montoya	Credited as Jonathan Gries
1987	Number One with a Bullet	Bobby Sweet	Credited as Jonathan Gries
1987	The Monster Squad	Desperate Man/Wolfman	Credited as Jonathan Gries
1987	Che's Revenge	Jack	Short
1988	Fright Night Part 2	Louie	Credited as Jonathan Gries
1989	Kill Me Again	Alan Swayzie	Credited as Jonathan Gries
1989	Pucker Up and Bark Like a Dog	Max	Credited as Jonathan Gries
1990	The Grifters	Drunk's Friend	Credited as Jonathan Gries
1993	Ed and His Dead Mother	Rob Sundheimer	
1995	Get Shorty	Ronnie Wingate	
1997	Casualties	Bill Summers	
1997	Men in Black	Van Driver	
1997	The Maze	Dr. Holmes	
1997	Mitzi & Joe	Joe	
1999	Twin Falls Idaho	Lawyer Jay Harrison	
2001	The Beatnicks	B Cool	
2001	Jackpot	Sunny Holiday / Glen Allen Johnson	Also co-producer
2003	Northfork	Arnold	
2003	The Big Empty	Elron	
2003	The Snow Walker	Pierce	
2003	The Rundown	Harvey	
2004	Napoleon Dynamite	Uncle Rico Dynamite	
2005	Confessions of an Action Star	Donald Buckheim	
2005	Waterborne	Ritter	
2005	Last Best Chance	Bernard Wheeler	Video
2006	The Sasquatch Gang	Chilcutt	
2006	Stick It	Brice Graham	
2006	The Astronaut Farmer	FBI Agent Killbourne	
2006	Car Babes	Gary	
2007	American Pastime	Ed Tully	
2007	Bicentennial Curious	Mick Jones	Short
2007	Fathom		Short
2007	September Dawn	John D. Lee	
2007	The Comebacks	Barber	
2007	Frank	Colin York	
2008	Taken	Casey	
2008	Bar Starz	Ricky Fabulous	
2008	South of Heaven	Hood #1	
2008	So Long Jimmy	Levi Franklin	
2008	Around June	Murry	
2009	Elsewhere	Mr. Tod	
2009	The Smell of Success	Early Dunchamp	
2009	A Lone Star State	Wyatt Kinney	Short
2010	Crazy on the Outside	Edgar	
2010	Good Intentions	Sheriff Ernie	
2010	Pearblossom	Harry	Short
2011	Natural Selection	Peter	
2011	Not Quite College	Tone Cash	
2011	5 Time Champion	Melvin Glee	
2011	Redemption: For Robbing the Dead	Tom Sutter	
2012	Deep in the Heart	Dick Wallrath	
2012	Unicorn City	Shadowhawk	
2012	Noobz	Greg Lipstein	
2012	Taken 2	Casey	
2012	Byron's Theme	Butcher	Short
2013	Bad Turn Worse	Sheriff Shep	
2013	A True Story	Richard Simpkins	
2013	Skinwalker Ranch	Hoyt	
2014	Eternity: The Movie	Barry Goldfield, Jr.	
2014	Faults	Terry	
2014	Locker 13	Archie	Segment: Title Story
2014	After We Rest	Mr. Norman	Short
2014	The Last Survivors	Carson	
2014	Brothers	Ronnie	Short
2014	Taken 3	Casey	
2015	Pass the Light	Franklin	
2015	Endgame	Principal Thomas	
2015	A Country Called Home	Tyler	
2015	Mucho Dinero	Jon Waters	
2016	Durant's Never Closes	Dizzy Dean	
2016	The Axe Murders of Villisca	Greg	
2016	Falsely Accused	Gus	
2016	The Knife Thrower	Circus Manager	
2016	Operation Chromite	Hoyt Vandenberg	
2017	All About the Money	Jon Waters	
2017	Americons	Billy	
2018	Glass Jaw	Sam Austin	
2024	Solvent	Gunner S. Holbrook	
2025	Carolina Caroline	Hank	

=== Television ===
Year	Title	Role	Notes
1976	Helter Skelter	William Garretson	TV movie
1977	Alexander: The Other Side of Dawn	Uncredited	TV movie
1977	Mulligan's Stew	Adams	Episode: "Melinda Special"
1979	240-Robert	Brad	Episode: "Poison Air"
1980	The White Shadow	Uri Kogenski	Episode: "The Russians Are Coming"
1983	The Powers of Matthew Star	Brad	Episode: "The Road Rebels"
1983	September Gun	Brian Brian	TV movie
1983	The Jeffersons	Frank	Episode: "I Do, I Don't"
1983	High School U.S.A.	Dirty Curt	TV movie
1987	The Twilight Zone	Nick Gatlin (Segment: "Shelter Skelter")	Episode: "Joy Ride/Shelter Skelter/Private Channel"
1987	Cagney & Lacey	Hands Callahan	Episode: "The City is Burning"
1988	Tattingers	Rick Jurasky	2 episodes
1989	Paradise	Emmett	Episode: "Dead Run"
1990	Falcon Crest	Stone	Episode: "Finding Lauren"
1990	Jake and the Fatman	Lenny Maddox	Episode: "By Myself"
1990	Tour of Duty	Maj. Rex Chapman, USAF	Episode: "The Raid"
1990	Rainbow Drive	Azzolini	TV movie
1991	Quantum Leap	Flash McGrath	Episode: "Glitter Rock–April 12, 1974"
1991	Fever	Bobby	TV movie
1992	L.A. Law	Dr. Harold Benson	Episode: "I'm Ready for My Closeup, Mr. Markowitz"
1992	Four Eyes and Six Guns		TV movie
1992–1994	Martin	Shawn McDermott	54 episodes
1993	Bakersfield P.D.	Ray Coombs	Episode: "A Bullet for Stiles"
1994	The X-Files	Salvatore Matola	Episode: "Sleepless"
1994	Beverly Hills, 90210	Mr. Trilling, Dope Dealer	4 episodes
1995	Chicago Hope	Jack Kimball	Episode: "Hello Goodbye"
1995	Strange Luck	Henry Bloom	Episode: "Last Chance"
1995	Seinfeld	Homeless Man	Episode: "The Beard"
1996	Race Against Time: The Search for Sarah	Steve	TV movie
1996–2000	The Pretender	Broots	82 episodes
1998	Seinfeld	Rusty	Episode: "The Bookstore"
2001	The Pretender 2001	Broots	TV movie
2001	ER	Defense Attorney Marty Nesmith	Episode: "Fear of Commitment"
2001	The Pretender: Island of the Haunted	Broots	TV movie
2002	24	Joseph Wald	Episode: "Day 2: 11:00 a.m.-12:00 p.m."
2003–2005	Carnivàle	Texas Ranger	2 episodes
2004	Las Vegas	Greg Walker	Episode: "Sons and Lovers"
2007–2010	Lost	Roger Linus	6 episodes
2008	CSI: NY	Jim Warren	Episode: "The Box"
2010	Cold Case	Bill Shepard '78	2 episodes
2010	Sons of Anarchy	Passport Forger	Episode: "So"
2010	Psych	Strabinsky	Episode: "One, Maybe Two, Ways Out"
2010	Nikita	The Engineer	Episode: "Dark Matter"
2010	Supernatural	Martin Creaser	2 episodes
2011	Hawaii Five-0	Liam Miller	Episode: "Lapa'au"
2012	Dr. Fubalous	Dr. Reed	2 episodes
2012	Napoleon Dynamite	Uncle Rico	6 episodes
2012	BlackBoxTV	Dad	Episode: "Silverwood: The Hunger"
2013–2014	The Bridge	Bob	7 episodes
2014	Criminal Minds	Clifford Walsh	Episode: "The Road Home"
2016–2020	Dream Corp LLC	Dr. Roberts	28 episodes
2021–present	The White Lotus	Greg Hunt	Recurring (season 1). Main role (seasons 2 - 3)
2024	It's Florida, Man	Denver	Episode: "Saucy"
2025	Saturday Night Live	Howard Lutnick	Episode: "Jon Hamm / Lizzo"
2025	Devil May Cry	President Hopper	Voice role
2025–present	Fallout	Biff	Recurring role

=== Video games ===
Year	Title	Role
2012	Hitman: Absolution	Sheriff Clive Skurky (voice)

== Music videos ==
As director

- Flies on Fire – "Long Gone Dead" (1989)
- Low Profile – "Pay Ya Dues" (1989)
- Low Profile – "That's Y They Do It" (1989)
- Low Profile – "Funky Song" (1990)
- Mere Mortals – "Cracked" (2006)

As actor

- Lenny Kravitz – "Mr. Cab Driver" (1990)
- Alice in Chains – "Rooster" (1993)
