= Michele Hicks =

American actress

- Occupation: Actress
- Years active: 1999–present
- Spouse: Jonny Lee Miller (m. 2008; div. 2018)
- Children: 1

Michele Hicks is an American actress and former fashion model who has worked in both film and television.

== Career ==
Her television appearances include Law & Order: Criminal Intent, Law & Order: Special Victims Unit, CSI: NY, Cold Case, The Shield and Heist. She also appeared in the music video for the song "Letting the Cables Sleep" by Bush.

== Personal life ==
Hicks married actor Jonny Lee Miller in June 2008 and they have one son.

== Filmography ==
=== Film ===
Year	Title	Role	Notes
1999	Twin Falls Idaho	Penny	
2000	Everything Put Together	April	
2000	Ropewalk	Samantha	
2001	Mulholland Drive	Nicki Pelazza	
2002	Deadly Little Secrets	Kyra Bennett	
2003	Northfork	Mrs. Hope	
2003	New York Stories	Michele	Short film
2003	Distress	Emma Hauser	
2004	Messengers	Sarah Chapel	
2007	What We Do Is Secret	Penelope Spheeris	
2011	Rehab	Sharon	
2013	Chlorine	Elise	
2014	2 Bedroom 1 Bath	Rachel	
2015	The Mother	Elise Harp	Short film
2015	Guns for Hire	Beatle	
2021	The Gateway	Sharon	

=== Television ===
Year	Title	Role	Notes
2001	Law & Order: Criminal Intent	Gia DeLuca	"One"
2003	Law & Order: Special Victims Unit	Kimmie	"Grief"
2004	Slogan	Jesse	TV film
2004	CSI: NY	Robin Prescott	"Creatures of the Night"
2004	Cold Case	Fannie (1943)	"Factory Girls"
2004-08	The Shield	Mara Sewell Vendrell	Recurring role
2006	Heist	Amy Sykes	Main role
2009	Life	Nina Fiske	"3 Women"
2010	The Mentalist	Betsy Meyers	"Red Carpet Treatment"
2015	Blue Bloods	Cat Holloway	"Sins of the Father"
2015	Mr. Robot	Sharon Knowles	Recurring role
2015	Public Morals	Kay O'Bannan	Recurring role
2017	Elementary	Thea Moser	"The Ballad of Lady Frances"
2018	Orange Is the New Black	Michelle Goldstein	Recurring role
2023	Magnum P.I.	Nadine Amherst	Episode: "Charlie Foxtrot"
