= Heist (2006 TV series) =

- Intertitle screen
- Genre: Crime drama
- Created by: Mark Cullen; Robb Cullen
- Starring: Dougray Scott; Michele Hicks; Steve Harris; Marika Dominczyk; Seymour Cassel; Billy Gardell; David Walton
- Country of origin: United States
- Original language: English
- No. of seasons: 1
- No. of episodes: 7 (2 unaired)

Production
- Executive producers: Mark Cullen; Robb Cullen
- Production companies: Cullen Bros. Television; Dutch Oven Productions; NBC Universal Television Studio; Sony Pictures Television

Original release
- Network: NBC
- Release: March 22 – April 19, 2006

Heist is an American crime drama television series created by Mark and Robb Cullen that premiered on NBC on March 22, 2006, but was almost immediately canceled on April 19, 2006, due to low ratings. The series revolves around professional thief Mickey O' Neil (Dougray Scott), who creates a team of experts to try to pull off the biggest heist in history — to simultaneously rob three jewelry stores on Rodeo Drive during Academy Awards week. Meanwhile, Amy Sykes (Michele Hicks), lead detective for LAPD's Robbery Division, leads the task force investigating a series of thefts committed by this new crew. Under high pressure from her superiors, she has to figure out not only who was behind the crimes, but also what larger job they are leading up to.

== Cast ==
- Dougray Scott as Mickey O'Neil
- Michele Hicks as Amy Sykes
- Steve Harris as James Johnson
- Seymour Cassel as Pops
- Marika Dominczyk as Lola
- Billy Gardell as Detective Billy O'Brien
- David Walton as Ricky
- Reno Wilson as Detective Tyrese Evans

== Reception ==
Metacritic gave the series 51 out of 100, from 22 reviews. Alessandra Stanley of The New York Times found "the story lines and characters are layered and more intricate than in most detective series" and compared Heist to the British show Hustle. Matthew Gilbert of The Boston Globe, in reviewing the two new shows premiering that night, Heist and The Evidence, declared "Heist is the better of the dramas." He likened both series to the work of Quentin Tarantino, saying they "have Pulp Fiction and Reservoir Dogs in their DNA." Tim Goodman of The San Francisco Chronicle found "the writing in Heist is self-consciously forced", further describing it as "painful to hear". "Heist is either the best inside joke about appeasing the masses for a monolithic network or, sadly, two guys who needed to pay the rent and buy mama some shoes." Tom Shales of The Washington Post describes this serialized drama as "confusingly shot and edited, populated with snarlingly cranky characters, and crowded with cheap tricks designed to alleviate the show's prevailing pall."

== Episodes ==
No.	Title	Directed by	Written by	Original release date	Prod. code
1	"Pilot"	Doug Liman	Mark Cullen, Robb Cullen	March 22, 2006	101
Note: Based on the Brian Douglas Wells incident.
2	"Sex, Lies, and Vinny Momo"	Andy Wolk	Mark Cullen, Robb Cullen	March 29, 2006	102
3	"Strife"	Andy Wolk	Mark Cullen, Robb Cullen (story); Evan Reilly (teleplay)	April 5, 2006	103
4	"How Billy Got His Groove Back"	Ed Bianchi	Mark Cullen, Robb Cullen	April 12, 2006	104
5	"Bury the Lead"	Ed Bianchi	Mark Cullen, Robb Cullen (story); Chris Mundy (teleplay)	April 19, 2006	105
6	"Ladies and Gentlemen... Sweaty Dynamite"	Guy Ferland	Mark Cullen, Robb Cullen	Unaired	106
7	"Hot Diggity"	TBD	Mark Cullen, Robb Cullen	Unaired	107
