= Pawn Shop (upcoming film) =

- Directed by: Michael Polish
- Written by: Jake Harlen
- Produced by: Dallas Sonnier; Ben Shapiro; Michael Richards; Ari Novak; Amanda Presmyk; Carter Boehm
- Starring: Myles Clohessy; Danny Trejo; Harvey Keitel; Henry Thomas
- Production companies: The Daily Wire; Bonfire Legend; Bonfire Pawn Shop LLC
- Distributed by: The Daily Wire
- Country: United States
- Language: English

Pawn Shop is an upcoming American action film written by Jake Harlen and directed by Michael Polish. The plot follows an ICE agent who runs to escape a mob of protesters after he detains an immigrant, and hides within a pawn shop. Produced by The Daily Wire, a conservative media company founded by Ben Shapiro, the film attracted early controversy for appearing to recreate the killing of Renée Good and for being seen as pro-ICE.

== Premise ==
Set during the civil unrest in Minneapolis during Operation Metro Surge carried out by ICE and CBP, a young ICE agent is left alone after his partner is seriously hurt and must find a way to avoid progressive protestors and an MS-13 death squad seeking to free the Hispanic man in the agent's custody who is a high ranking MS-13 boss. Seeking shelter inside a neighborhood pawn shop, he becomes trapped with a traditional Hispanic father and his progressive college-age son. As tensions rise between those sheltering in the pawn shop and neighboring Korean grocery store, the group must also try to survive the escalating violence of the protestors and gang members surrounding them.

== Cast ==
- Myles Clohessy
- Danny Trejo
- Harvey Keitel
- Henry Thomas
- CJ Salvador
- Noel Gugliemi
- Paris Bravo

== Production ==
The film began production on September 22, 2026 and finished filming on October 9. It was produced with a "conditional start" status from SAG-AFTRA, meaning that producers could start filming while other matters were resolved.

The film's script was released to the public and described the character of Melanie as "a fat blue-hair" along with employees at a grocery store called "Kim's Seoul Market" who were described as "roof Koreans". Other characters include an "overweight liberal in a mobility scooter", a heroin addict who calls another character a "cuck", and an MS-13 gang member who poses as an innocent laborer.

Production companies include Texas-based Bonfire Pawnshop LLC, Cinestate Development Two LLC, owned by producer Dallas Sonnier and Yellowstone Film Ranch owned by Carter Boehm. City managers as well as the police department received multiple complaints from residents, local business owners, and the production regarding the filming and protesters.

=== Controversy ===
The Bozeman Daily Chronicle reported that production on the film began in September 22, 2026 in Livingston, Montana and was scheduled to continue through October 10. It was described as being pro-ICE and received controversy for a scene within the film that appeared to resemble the killing of Renée Good. During production, the film received complaints from residents and local business owners for its political content and for using blank gunshots, pyrotechnics, and a staged car crash without notifying nearby residents, which led to many protesting the film. A call sheet listed Danny Trejo, Harvey Keitel and Henry Thomas among the film's cast.

The Livingston City Commission voted unanimously during a special meeting on October 3 to suspend production over the disruption to local business, impeding access to the Livingston Food Resource Center, and the production's insufficient notice to local residents of the dangerous stunts being performed. The Livingston Food Resource Center reported that clients had felt uncomfortable due to the content of the movie and the private security of the production. During another special meeting on October 5, the Commission unanimously reinstated the filming permit after being revised. The revised permit required the film crew to allow locals access to the food pantry, to shield locals from violent scenes, and to prevent private security from policing or harassing locals.

In his podcast The Ben Shapiro Show, producer Ben Shapiro decried the Livingston City Commission's suspension of Pawn Shop was purely political and "a violation of the First Amendment". Shapiro further stated:

We are obviously right over the target. When you try to shout us down, you only make us more powerful. Your antics are not going to work. The film will be completed and it will be released and it will be highly successful. We call those feathers in our cap. Trophies over our mantle.

After a call sheet was released, Danny Trejo, an actor who depicted a Hispanic shop owner in the film, reported to have received backlash for his association with the project. In response to the backlash, Danny Trejo's son Gilbert said in a social media post that his father had no idea about the film's stances on ICE and immigration and was unfamiliar with Shapiro and his involvement within the film. According to Gilbert and his agent, Gloria Hinojosa, it wasn't until the film was two weeks into filming that Danny became aware of Ben Shapiro's and the Daily Wire's involvement. Gilbert also asserted that Trejo was legally obligated to finish the film and could not badmouth it or make a statement without the risk of being sued for breach of contract.

A crew member, who chose to remain anonymous, reported to IndieWire, that they were told that it was a "fun action movie" and that they quit after discovering its politics. They also stated that about a dozen other crew members quit their posts for similar reasons.
