= Stay Cool =

- Theatrical poster
- Directed by: Michael Polish (as 'Ted Smith')
- Written by: Mark Polish
- Produced by: Ken Johnson
- Starring: Winona Ryder; Mark Polish; Hilary Duff; Sean Astin; Josh Holloway; Jon Cryer; Chevy Chase
- Cinematography: M. David Mullen
- Distributed by: Initiate Productions
- Release dates: April 23, 2009 (Tribeca); September 16, 2011 (United States)
- Running time: 94 minutes
- Country: United States
- Language: English
- Budget: $4.5 million

Stay Cool is a 2009 American comedy film directed by Michael Polish (credited as Ted Smith), and written by Mark Polish. The film stars Winona Ryder, Polish, Hilary Duff, Sean Astin, Josh Holloway, Jon Cryer, and Chevy Chase. The film premiered at the 2009 Tribeca Film Festival and released theatrically in 2011.

== Premise ==
Henry McCarthy, a successful author, is invited back to his old high school to give the commencement address for the class 19 years after his. He finally has to face his past demons to be able to move on as a person and a writer.

== Cast ==
- Mark Polish as Henry McCarthy
- Winona Ryder as Scarlet Smith
- Hilary Duff as Shasta O'Neil
- Josh Holloway as Wino
- Max Thieriot as Luke
- Sean Astin as Big Girl
- Chevy Chase as Principal Marshall
- Jon Cryer as Javier
- Marc Blucas as Brad Nelson
- Frances Conroy as Mrs. Looch

== Production ==
Stay Cool was filmed between July and September 2008 in Santa Clarita, Saugus and Valencia (California).

== Release ==
A film festival version of Stay Cool was shown at the Tribeca Film Festival on April 23, 2009 and received favorable reviews. It was presented under the category for "World Narrative Film Festival". On the official Tribeca Film Festival it was described as a film that "...reminds us that time certainly does fly and old flames are hard to put out." A version of the film was also premiered in May 2010 at the Marché du Film of Cannes (France).

It had a September 16, 2011 theatrical release in the United States.

== Reception ==
MTV ranked the film #5 on the "Top 10 Movies That Will Have You Screaming 'Oh My God!'" calling it "the most adult-minded movie on this list".

On Rotten Tomatoes the film has a rating of 14% based on reviews from 7 critics.

Robert Abele of the Los Angeles Times wrote: "Attempts to pay homage to the '80s oeuvre of filmmaker John Hughes, but its singular lack of emotional logic, charm and humor bring to mind a couple of hours in detention instead."
