= Stephen Blackwell =

American politician

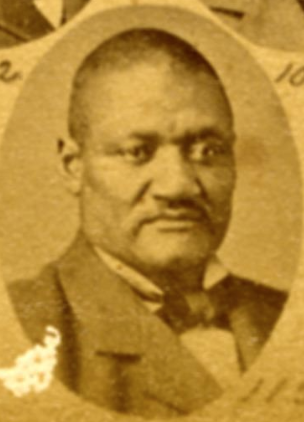

Stephen B. Blackwell (born August 5, 1849) was an American politician. He was a state legislator in Mississippi.

He was born in Issaquena County and represented it in the Mississippi House of Representatives from 1882 to 1889. He was a Republican and a Baptist.

After his 1887 re-election he was to be one of ten Republicans in the Mississippi House, five of them "colored".

== See also ==
- African American officeholders from the end of the Civil War until before 1900
