= Polish brothers =

American twin filmmakers

Mark and Michael Polish
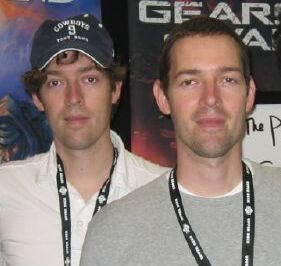
- Michael and Mark Polish in 2007
- Born: Mark J. Polish; Michael J. Polish; October 30, 1970 (age 55); El Centro, California, U.S.
- Occupations: Screenwriters; film producers, film directors; actors
- Years active: 1999–present
- Spouse: Michael: Kate Bosworth (m. 2013; div. 2023)

Mark Polish and Michael Polish (born October 30, 1970), known informally as the Polish brothers, are American twin filmmakers. Michael usually directs their films, and Mark often has an acting role.

== Early lives ==
The Polish brothers were born in El Centro, California. Their father is from Montana, and is of part Austrian ancestry. He used to work at the DEA in Sacramento. Their paternal grandfather worked on the dams of Montana. Their mother's family is Mexican. The brothers were raised Catholic.

== Career ==
The Polish brothers began their film career with the 1999 Sundance debut of their first feature, Twin Falls Idaho. The identical twin siblings wrote and starred in the tale of conjoined twins. Michael directed. Sony Pictures Classics bought the rights for theatrical distribution of the film, which Janet Maslin of The New York Times said had "style, gravity and originality to spare."

In an interview with Robert K. Elder for the book The Film That Changed My Life, Michael Polish said that much of his own inspiration came from watching Once Upon a Time in America in his youth.

... Internally it speaks to me, as just a human, a person alone. I can watch this movie alone and be a fan. Whether a filmmaker or not, I can be a fan because it has so many symbols and situations that reflect life itself, growing up. Even growing up in the suburbs, you still have friendships the same way these kids have friendships.

In 2000, the Polish brothers followed up Twin Falls Idaho with Jackpot, the story of a deluded karaoke singer (Jon Gries) on a tour of American dive-bars. It won the 2001 Independent Spirit John Cassavetes Award and the 2001 Seattle International Film Festival New American Cinema Award. The film was distributed theatrically by Sony Pictures Classics.

In 2002, the brothers were offered the opportunity to make a mainstream film. Instead, they began to put together the independent film Northfork. When financing collapsed days before principal photography, the filmmakers signed their house to creditors, and paid for their movie with personal credit cards. Starring James Woods and Nick Nolte, Northfork was chosen as an early selection by the Sundance Film Festival, and when the movie premiered at Sundance in 2003, Roger Ebert called it "a masterpiece."

In 2005, the Polish brothers, along with producing partner Jonathan Sheldon, wrote and released The Declaration of Independent Filmmaking. The book, a how-to guide for first-time, do-it-yourself filmmakers, follows the filmmaking process and gives firsthand accounts of the Polish Brothers' travails in making their films. The Library Journal said the Polish Brothers "write in a way that illuminates the details more clearly than most technical scribes."

In 2006, the brothers would team with Warner Independent for their fourth film, The Astronaut Farmer about a former NASA astronaut, Charles Farmer (Billy Bob Thornton), who has been obsessively building a rocket in his barn. Warner Bros. released it throughout North America in 2007.

The brothers then shot two films back-to-back, just days apart while launching their new production company Prohibition Pictures with partners Ken Johnson, Janet DuBois, and Jonathan Sheldon. The Polish Brothers' fifth film, Manure (with Billy Bob Thornton and Téa Leoni) began shooting on May 27, 2008 and was released at the Sundance Festival the following year as The Smell of Success), and the Polish Brothers' sixth film, Stay Cool (with Winona Ryder, Mark Polish, Chevy Chase, Sean Astin, Hilary Duff, Jon Cryer, Josh Holloway) began filming in July 2008 (and was shown at Tribeca Festival in 2009).

In May 2010, the Polish brothers began filming For Lovers Only. Said to be inspired by the French New Wave and Claude Lelouch's 1966 double Oscar-winner A Man and a Woman, the romance focuses on a journalist Stana Katic (Castle) in Paris on assignment, who runs into a lover (Mark Polish) from her past. Presumably enraptured by reconciliation, the pair flee Paris and travel "by train, car, and motorcycle as their love affair takes them across France from Normandy to St. Tropez."

In 2013, Michael directed American adventure drama, Big Sur, an adaptation of the 1962 novel of the same name by Jack Kerouac. The story is based on the time Kerouac spent in Big Sur, California and his three brief sojourns to friend Lawrence Ferlinghetti's cabin in Bixby Canyon. The film debuted on January 23, 2013 at the 2013 Sundance Film Festival, where it received generally positive reviews.

In 2014, it was announced that Mark would write, direct, and star in Headlock (later retitled Against the Clock. The film also starred Dianna Agron and Andy Garcia.

== Personal life ==
In July 2011, Michael began dating actress Kate Bosworth, and on August 31, 2013, the couple married in Philipsburg, Montana. They separated in August 2021.

== Filmography ==
Michael Polish

Year	Title	Director	Writer	Producer
1999	Twin Falls Idaho	Yes	Yes	No
2001	Jackpot	Yes	Yes	No
2003	Northfork	Yes	Yes	No
2006	The Astronaut Farmer	Yes	Yes	No
2009	The Smell of Success	Yes	Yes	No
2009	Stay Cool	Yes	No	No
2010	For Lovers Only	Yes	No	Yes
2013	Big Sur	Yes	Yes	Yes
2014	Amnesiac	Yes	No	No
2015	90 Minutes in Heaven	Yes	Yes	Yes
2016	Hot Bot	Yes	Yes	No
2017	Nona	Yes	Yes	No
2019	One of the Good Ones	No	No	Executive
2020	Force of Nature	Yes	No	No
2021	American Traitor: The Trial of Axis Sally	Yes	No	No
2022	Terror on the Prairie	Yes	No	No
2025	Alarum	Yes	No	No
TBA	Pawn Shop	Yes	No	No

Mark Polish

Year	Title	Director	Writer	Producer
1999	Twin Falls Idaho	No	Yes	No
2001	Jackpot	No	Yes	No
2003	Northfork	No	Yes	No
2006	The Astronaut Farmer	No	Yes	No
2009	The Smell of Success	No	Yes	No
2009	Stay Cool	No	Yes	No
2010	For Lovers Only	No	Yes	Yes
2019	Against the Clock	Yes	Yes	No
2022	Murmur	Yes	Yes	No

=== Acting roles ===
Michael Polish

- Hellraiser: Bloodline (1996) – Twin Cenobite No. 1
- The Good Thief (2002)

Mark Polish

- Hellraiser: Bloodline (1996) – Twin Cenobite No. 2
- The Good Thief (2002)
- Twin Falls Idaho (1999)
- Jackpot (2001)
- Northfork (2003)
- The Astronaut Farmer (2006)
- The Smell of Success (2009)
- For Lovers Only (2010)
- Hot Bot (2016)
- Against the Clock (2019)
- Alarum (2025)

== Bibliography ==
- The Declaration of Independent Filmmaking: An Insider's Guide to Making Movies Outside of Hollywood, with Jonathan Sheldon. Mariner Books 2005, ISBN 978-0156029520
