= Rosey Chan =

Pianist

- Born: London, England
- Citizenship: British
- Education: Royal College of Music
- Occupations: Pianist, composer
- Website: roseychan.com

Rosey Chan is a multimedia artist and musician. Her work incorporates cinematic visuals and combines own compositions with selected classical repertoire and electronic fusion. She has collaborated on projects involving architecture, design, poetic spoken word, contemporary dance, experimental music, and film composition.

== Early life and education ==
Rosey Chan was born in the United Kingdom to Chinese parents. She attended the Royal Academy of Music on a piano scholarship. She then went on to be classically trained in composition, piano and violin at the Royal College of Music in South Kensington, London. She also plays guitar, accordion, and keyboards.

== Career ==
After graduating from the Royal College of Music, Chan performed at venues such as the Royal Albert Hall, Wigmore Hall, Royal Festival Hall and Carnegie Hall. She has been a Steinway Artist since 2013.

In 2008, Chan focused expanding her repertoire to include contemporary electronic music, improvisation, film scoring, performance art and working with dance. She has presented her work at The Royal Opera House, The Royal Festival Hall, Pompidou Centre, The 100 club, Le Poisson Rouge in New York, Gagosian Gallery in Paris and The Serpentine Gallery in London.

Chan has also presented contemporary art installations. Her multi-media performance piece March of the Jingoists premiered at the 2009 Frieze Art Fair. Her three-screen video installation Past Present Future premiered at the 2010 Hong Kong Art Fair.

Artists she has worked with include: Marina Abramović, Doug Aitken, Fanny Ardant, Antony Gormley, Patrik Schumacher, Zaha Hadid Architects, Charles Dance, Jonas Mekas, Zowie Broach, Nick Knight, Central School of Ballet and Dance.

Musicians she has collaborated with include: William Orbit, Queen, Sting, Synematik, Stargate Music, Michael Nyman, Carnet de Voyage Music, The Invisible Men, Ali Tennant, Ilan Eshkeri, Gregg Wilson, Mike Figgis, Vaal, Victoria Bond, The English Chamber Orchestra, London Contemporary Orchestra.

In 2009, Chan co-founded a piece of music, food and wine festival in Tuscany with Luca Sanjust, Mike Figgis and ex-Wine Spectator editor James Suckling.

In 2011, Chan curated cultural programming for the first Hong Kong Liberatum Festival, an international cultural festival and summit. The program brought together participants from Europe, the United States, and China and included workshops for students in music, film, architecture, and photography, as well as talks and performances throughout the festival.

In 2019, Rosey Chan was invited by Penny Martin of The Gentlewoman to participate in a series of debates. Chan's debated with Ann Friedman moderated by Martin on the top of “This House Believes There is Nothing Original Under the Sun”.

Chan supports environmental charity Client Earth. She composed and recorded (by the English Chamber Orchestra) Adagio for Planet Earth which she has dedicated to the charity.

=== Solo releases ===
Chan released her debut album ONE in 2010. It was produced by the singer-songwriter Sting and featured tracks by, Bach, Debussy, Bill Evans and Tom Waits.

Her second album 8 years of my life was released in March 2018 with a limited-edition vinyl of her solo piano improvisations.

She released an electronic album in 2019 under the band name Carnet de Voyage Music.

In 2020, during the COVID-19 lockdown, Chan released Mindful Piano Music, a collection of piano compositions intended to support creativity, work and focus while people were confined to their homes. During this period, she produced more singles, notably "Truth and Reconciliation", "How We Danced" and an EP Influence, a salute to some of the iconic women who have inspired Chan (Nina Simone, Jeanne Moreau, Eva Yerbabuena, Margot Fonteyn).

== Personal life ==
Chan resides in London.

== Discography ==
=== Studio Albums ===
- One (2010)
- 8 Years Of My Life (2018)
- Melo Disko (2019)
- Joy, A Rosey Chan Christmas (2020)
- Sonic Apothecary (2021)

=== EPs ===
- Influence (2020)

=== Singles ===
- "Truth and Reconciliation" (2020)
- "How We Danced" (2020)
- "Unity" (2020)
- "After The Affair" (2020)
- "Audrey" (2020)
- "Solstice" (2020)
- "Autumn" (2020)
- "The China Series - Shanghai" (2020)
- "Over The Rainbow" (2020)
- "Live From The Royal Festival Hall" (2020)
- "Silent Night" (2020)
- "Infinity" (2021)
- "Water Is Life" (2021)

=== Compositions (films) ===
- Improvisation for the Left Hand
- China-Town (2011)
- An Afternoon in Como (2014)
- A day In The Life...
- Jaguar Cars campaign "Alive"
- Parametricism
- Millennial
- Adagio for Planet Earth
- Besame
- Petrolo
- My First Red Dress
- Suspicious Talks featuring Fanny Ardant
- Prague 1850
- Transmissions

=== Documentaries ===
- One & Other a Portrait of Trafalgar Square (Red Mullet, 2009)
- Diva - Sky Arts 3D (China-Town Productions, Red Mullet, 2009)
- Just Tell The Truth (Royal Opera House, Deloitte, 2011)
