= Against the Clock =

2019 American thriller film

- Film poster
- Directed by: Mark Polish
- Written by: Mark Polish
- Produced by: Ryan R. Johnson
- Starring: Mark Polish; Dianna Agron; Justin Bartha; Andy Garcia
- Cinematography: Jesse Brunt
- Edited by: Mark Polish; Jamison Forkenbrock; Bryan A. Shaw
- Music by: Michael Andrews
- Production company: Benaroya Pictures
- Distributed by: Gravitas Ventures
- Release date: January 11, 2019
- Running time: 102 minutes
- Country: United States
- Language: English

Against the Clock (formerly titled Headlock, also known as Transference) is a 2019 American thriller film directed by Mark Polish and starring Polish, Dianna Agron, Justin Bartha and Andy Garcia.

== Plot summary ==
Kelley Chandler, a new CIA recruit, is badly injured during a mission and survives only with the help of machines. His wife Tess, a former CIA agent, is determined to find out what really happened to him. As the details of Kelley's last mission come to light, it becomes clear that the accident was actually part of a setup. Tess does everything she can to keep Kelley safe, even when it puts her in dangerous situations.

== Cast ==
- Mark Polish as Kelley Chandler
- Dianna Agron as Tess Chandler
- Andy Garcia as Gerald Hotchkiss
- Justin Bartha as Peter Hobbs
- James Frain as Dr. A
- Bar Paly as Lauren De Isigney
