= The Smell of Success =

- Theatrical poster
- Directed by: Michael Polish (as Larry Smith)
- Written by: Mark Polish; Michael Polish
- Produced by: Janet DuBois; Kenneth Johnson; Jonathan Sheldon
- Starring: Billy Bob Thornton; Téa Leoni; Kyle MacLachlan; Ed Helms
- Cinematography: M. David Mullen
- Edited by: Cary Gries
- Music by: Stuart Matthewman
- Production company: Initiate Productions
- Distributed by: Cinedigm
- Release dates: January 20, 2009 (Sundance Film Festival); August 19, 2011 (United States)
- Running time: 94 minutes
- Country: United States
- Language: English

The Smell of Success is a 2009 American comedy film directed by Michael Polish and starring Billy Bob Thornton, Téa Leoni, Kyle MacLachlan, and Ed Helms.

The film was produced by Initiate Productions, and premiered at the 2009 Sundance Film Festival under its original title Manure. It was given a limited theatrical release under its new title by Cinedigm in the United States on August 19, 2011.

== Plot ==
The film opens in 1963 as the FTC is investigating the company, which is $2 million in debt. It all begins when a tragic fan accident ends the life of Mr. Rose, the scientific genius behind Rose's Manure Company, forcing his cosmetics salesgirl daughter Rosemary (Téa Leoni) to take control of the company. Rosemary isn't sure if she has a nose for the family business, but when she discovers the company is about to go under, she is determined to find a way to keep the company successful. She's going to need the help of her father's best salesmen led by Patrick Fitzpatrick (Billy Bob Thornton), who begins tutoring her in the fine art of bullshitting.

== Cast ==
- Billy Bob Thornton as Patrick Fitzpatrick
- Téa Leoni as Rosemary Rose
- Kyle MacLachlan as Jimmy St. James
- Ed Helms as Chet Pigford
- Mark Polish as Thaddeus Young
- Pruitt Taylor Vince as Cleveland Clod
- Frances Conroy as Agnes May

== Production ==
The Smell of Success was filmed on location in Santa Clarita, California. Its original title was Manure.
