= Big Sur (film) =

- film poster
- Directed by: Michael Polish
- Written by: Michael Polish
- Based on: Big Sur by Jack Kerouac
- Produced by: Ross Jacobson; Orian Williams; Adam Kassen; Michael Polish
- Starring: Jean-Marc Barr; Josh Lucas; Radha Mitchell; Kate Bosworth
- Cinematography: M. David Mullen
- Edited by: Geraud Brisson; Robert Frazen
- Music by: Aaron and Bryce Dessner
- Production company: 3311 Productions
- Distributed by: Ketchup Entertainment
- Release dates: 23 January 2013 (Sundance); 28 April 2013 (SFIFF)
- Running time: 73 minutes (Sundance); 90 minutes (SFIFF)
- Country: United States
- Language: English
- Box office: $35,072

Big Sur is a 2013 adventure drama film written and directed by Michael Polish. It is an adaptation of the 1962 novel of the same name by Jack Kerouac.

The story is based on the time Kerouac spent in Big Sur, California, and his three brief sojourns to his friend Lawrence Ferlinghetti's cabin in Bixby Canyon. These trips were taken by Kerouac in an attempt to recuperate from his mental and physical deterioration due to his alcoholism and the pressures of his sudden success.

The film premiered at the 2013 Sundance Film Festival before receiving a limited theatrical release in the United States on November 1, 2013, and has received generally negative reviews.

== Plot ==
Jack Kerouac, coming off the recent success of On the Road, is unable to cope with a suddenly demanding public and his rise in popularity, and begins battling with advanced alcoholism as a result. He seeks respite first in solitude in the Big Sur cabin, then in a relationship with Billie, the mistress of his long-time friend Neal Cassady. Kerouac finds respite in the Big Sur wilderness, but is driven by loneliness to return to the city, and resumes drinking heavily.

Across Kerouac's subsequent trips to Big Sur and interleaved lifestyle in San Francisco, he drunkenly embarrasses Cassady by introducing Billie to Cassady's wife Carolyn, cannot emotionally provide for the increasingly demanding Billie, and finds himself increasingly unable to integrate into suburban life. Kerouac's inner turmoil culminates in his nervous breakdown during his third journey to Big Sur.

== Cast ==
Unlike the novel, which uses pseudonyms for every major character, the film uses their real names (with the exception of Billie, whose real name is Jackie Gibson Mercer). Also, a few major characters from the novel, such as Allen Ginsberg, Robert LaVigne, Albert Saijo, and Gary Snyder, were cut from the film.

- Jean-Marc Barr as Jack Kerouac
- Josh Lucas as Neal Cassady
- Radha Mitchell as Carolyn Cassady
- Anthony Edwards as Lawrence Ferlinghetti
- Stana Katic as Lenore Kandel
- Balthazar Getty as Michael McClure
- Kate Bosworth as Willamine "Billie" Dabney
- Henry Thomas as Philip Whalen
- Patrick Fischler as Lew Welch
- Jason W. Wong as Victor Wong
- Ryan Teeple as Elliot Dabney
- Jasper Polish as Vulture Girl

== Production ==
Much of the filming was in Monterey County, California, including Big Sur, where the events of the novel take place.

Music was composed by Aaron and Bryce Dessner of The National.

The film was in post-production as of February 2012. A teaser trailer was released on Vimeo on September 23.

== Reception ==
On Rotten Tomatoes, the film has a score of 44%, based on 25 reviews.
