= Stana Katic =

Canadian and American actress (born 1978)

Stana Katić
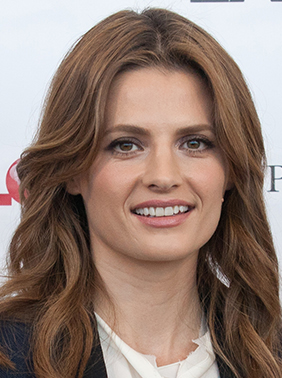
- Katic in 2015
- Born: April 26, 1978 (age 48); Hamilton, Ontario, Canada
- Citizenship: Canada; US
- Education: University of Toronto (BA); DePaul University (attended)
- Occupation: Actress
- Years active: 1999–present
- Spouse: Kris Brkljač (m. 2015)
- Children: 1
- Awards: Full list
- Website: www.stanakatic.com

Stana Katić (/ˈstɑːnə ˈkætɪk/; born April 26, 1978) is a Canadian and American actress. She played Kate Beckett on the ABC television romantic crime series Castle (2009–2016) and FBI Special Agent Emily Byrne in the psychological thriller series Absentia (2017–2020).

== Early life ==
Katic was born in Hamilton, Ontario, Canada. In describing her ethnicity, she has stated "My parents are Serbs from Croatia. I call us Dalmatian because that's the part of the planet that we are originally from. I have Serb, Croat and even a handful of Montenegrin family members." Her father is from Vrlika, Croatia, and her mother is from the surrounding area of Sinj, Croatia.

Katic later moved with her family to Aurora, Illinois. She spent the following years moving back and forth between Canada and the United States. After graduating from West Aurora High School in 1996, Katic enrolled to study International Relations, Economics, and pre-law at the University of Toronto's Trinity College, then enrolled at The Theatre School at DePaul University where she studied toward a Master of Fine Arts in acting from 2000 to 2002. Katic studied acting at the Beverly Hills Playhouse acting school.

== Career ==
Katic played Hana Gitelman in Heroes, Collette Stenger in 24's season five, and Jenny in the film Feast of Love starring Morgan Freeman. She also played Morgenstern in Frank Miller's film The Spirit, Canadian Intelligence agent Corrine Veneau in the James Bond film Quantum of Solace (though she was originally up for the role of Strawberry Fields in the film), and Simone Renoir in the third installment of The Librarian franchise, The Librarian: Curse of the Judas Chalice.

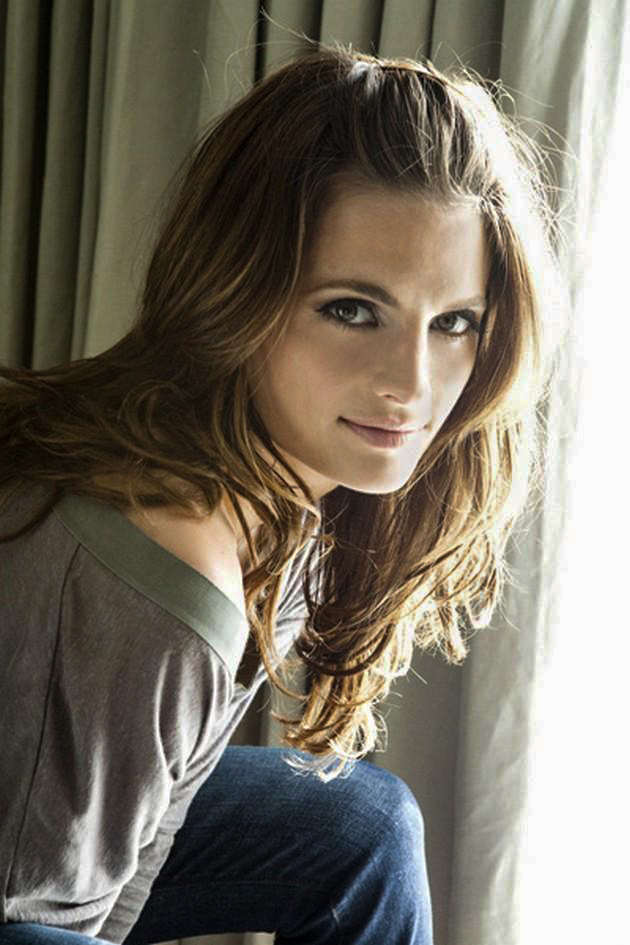
Katic in May 2010

In August 2008, ABC announced acquisition of the television series Castle, starring Katic as Kate Beckett and Nathan Fillion as Richard Castle. In 2008, Katic established her own production company, Sine Timore Productions, which is Latin for "without fear".

The entertainment website BuddyTV placed Katic, as Kate Beckett in Castle, on its annual list of "TV's 100 Sexiest Women" every year from 2009 to 2013, including at No. 1 in 2011. Aside from her looks, the website also gave her some credit as an actress, placing Katic at No. 6 on its list of "The 15 Best Drama Lead Actresses of the 2011–2012 TV Season". Katic was also on the Maxim Hot 100 list from 2012 through 2014.

In the summer of 2010, Katic filmed For Lovers Only with the Polish brothers in France and The Double with Richard Gere. At the third annual Shorty Awards held on 28 March 2011, she won the actress category. In May 2011, she won the Most Glamorous Actress online ballot for the Monte-Carlo Television Festival.

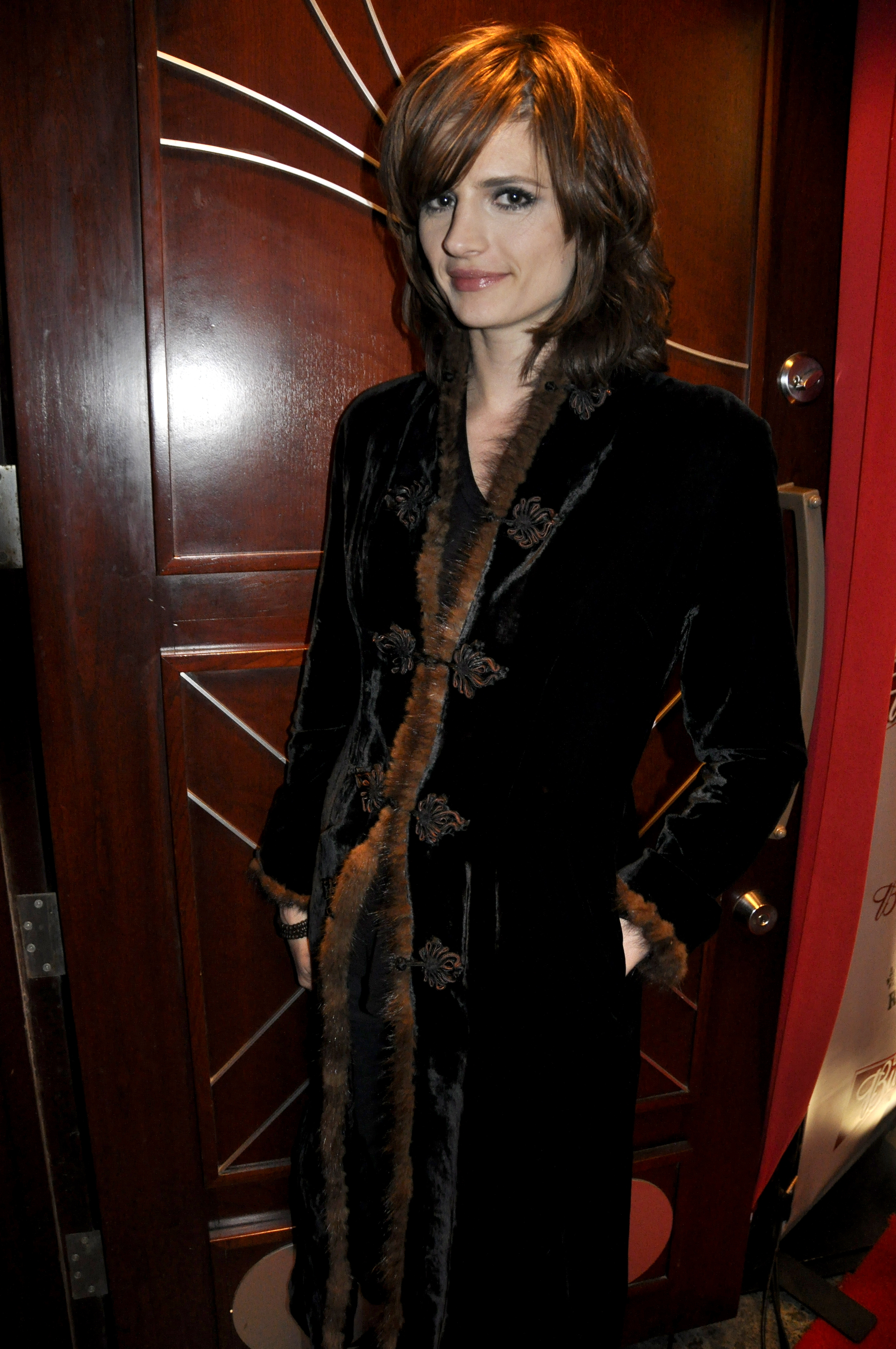
Katic in 2009

In 2011, she served as a jury member at the Film Festival Zlín, where For Lovers Only made its world premiere. Big Sur, in which she plays Lenore Kandel, premiered at the Sundance Film Festival in January 2013. In conjunction with the 2011 San Diego Comic-Con, there was an official announcement in Entertainment Weekly that she would become the voice for Talia al Ghul in Batman: Arkham City.

In January 2012, she was a presenter at the 64th Annual Directors Guild of America Awards. She was the recipient of the PRISM Award for Performance in a Drama Episode at the 16th Annual PRISM Awards for her portrayal of suffering from post-traumatic stress disorder in the Castle season-four episode "Kill Shot". Katic was nominated for the 39th People's Choice Awards in the Favorite Dramatic TV Actress category, before winning the category at the 40th People's Choice Awards.

Katic portrayed rock singer and producer Genya Ravan in the 2013 film CBGB. In April 2016, ABC and ABC Studios confirmed that they would not be renewing Katic's contract for a ninth season of Castle, which would be a shortened season in a cost cutting effort. The series was outright canceled on 12 May 2016.

Katic played Carolina Baxter in the Lifetime film Sister Cities that premiered on 17 September 2016. On 26 September 2016, she appeared in White Rabbit Red Rabbit by Nassim Soleimanpour at New York's Westside Theatre. Katic starred as Rachel Rozman in the 2016 film, The Rendezvous, opposite Raza Jaffrey. In 2016, Katic was cast in the horror film Cadaver In January 2017, Katic appeared as Anna in the film Lost in Florence.

Katic was cast as Emily Byrne in the AXN series Absentia that premiered in 2017.

In 2019, she played Vera Atkins in A Call to Spy, the film is inspired by the stories of three women who worked as spies in World War II.

== Personal life ==
She holds dual citizenship in Canada and the United States.

She founded the Alternative Travel Project in 2010 which is an initiative to encourage people to "GOcarFREE for just ONE day!" and seek out alternative methods of public transportation to reduce the environmental impact of personal vehicles.

Katic wrote the lyrics for "Hey Blue Eyes", which she sang for fans at the 51st Zlín Film Festival in 2011.

Katic married her longtime boyfriend, Kris Brkljac, an Australian business efficiency consultant, in a private ceremony in Croatia on 25 April 2015, one day before her 37th birthday.

On 19 June 2022, a representative of Katic confirmed that Katic and Brkljac welcomed their first child during the winter.

== Filmography ==
Key
†	Denotes films that have not yet been released

=== Film ===
Year	Title	Role	Notes
1999	Acid Freaks	Annie	Short film
2003	Shut-Eye	Angela	Direct-to-video film
2005	Pit Fighter	Marianne	
2007	Feast of Love	Jenny	
2008	Stiletto	Raina	
2008	Quantum of Solace	Corrine Veneau	
2008	The Spirit	Morgenstern	
2010	Truth About Kerry	Emma	
2011	For Lovers Only	Sofia	
2011	The Double	Amber	
2013	Big Sur	Lenore Kandel	
2013	Superman: Unbound	Lois Lane	Voice role
2013	CBGB	Genya Ravan	
2016	The Rendezvous	Rachel Rozman	
2017	Lost in Florence	Anna	
2018	The Possession of Hannah Grace	Lisa Roberts	
2019	A Call to Spy	Vera Atkins	
2021	Justice Society: World War II	Diana / Wonder Woman	Voice role
2023	Justice League: Warworld	Wonder Woman	Voice role
2024	Justice League: Crisis on Infinite Earths	Wonder Woman, Superwoman	Voice role

=== Television ===
Year	Title	Role	Notes
2004	The Handler	Mariella	Episode: "Bleak House"
2004	Alias	Flight Attendant	Episode: "Facade"
2004	L.A. Dragnet	Miriam Nelson	Episode: "Retribution"
2004	The Shield	Ayla	2 episodes
2004	JAG	Lucienne Charmoli	Episode: "This Just in from Baghdad"
2005	The Closer	Nadia Orwell	Episode: "The Big Picture"
2005	ER	Blaire Collins	2 episodes
2006	24	Collette Stenger	3 episodes
2006	Dragon Dynasty	Ava	Television film
2006	Brothers & Sisters	Karen Wells	Episode: "Patriarchy"
2006	Faceless	Diana Palos	Unsold television pilot
2007	Company Man	Donna Baker	Unsold television pilot
2007	Heroes	Hana Gitelman	2 episodes
2007	CSI: Miami	Rita Sullivan	Episode: "Deep Freeze"
2007	The Unit	Special Agent Debra Lane	Episode: "Binary Explosion"
2008	Would Be Kings	Julianna Martinelli	Television miniseries
2008	The Librarian: Curse of the Judas Chalice	Simone Renoir	Television film
2009–2016	Castle	Detective/Captain Kate Beckett	Main role (Episode: "The Blue Butterfly" as Vera Mulqueen)
2012	Fletcher Drive	Greta	Episode: "The Intervention"
2016	Sister Cities	Carolina Baxter Shaw	Television film
2017–2020	Absentia	Agent Emily Byrne	Main role
2024	Murder in a Small Town	Zoe Strachan	1 episode

=== Video games ===
Year	Title	Role	Notes
2011	Batman: Arkham City	Talia al Ghul	Voice role

== Awards and nominations ==
Year	Award	Category	Work	Result	Refs
2009	Satellite Awards	Best Actress in a Series, Drama	Castle	Nominated	
2011	TV Guide Magazine's Fan Favorites Awards	Favorite Couple Who Should (Shared with Nathan Fillion)	Castle	Won	
2012	TV Guide Magazine's Fan Favorites Awards	Favorite TV Couple (Shared with Nathan Fillion)	Castle	Won	
2012	PRISM Awards	Performance in a Drama Episode (Tied with Jon Huertas)	Castle	Won	
2013	TV Guide Magazine's Fan Favorites Awards	Favorite TV Couple (Shared with Nathan Fillion)	Castle	Won	
2013	People's Choice Awards	Favorite Dramatic TV Actress	Castle	Nominated	
2014	People's Choice Awards	Favorite Dramatic TV Actress	Castle	Won	
2014	People's Choice Awards	Favorite On-Screen Chemistry (Shared with (Nathan Fillion)	Castle	Nominated	
2015	People's Choice Awards	Favorite TV Duo (Shared with Nathan Fillion)	Castle	Nominated	
2015	People's Choice Awards	Favorite Crime Drama TV Actress	Castle	Won	
2016	People's Choice Awards	Favorite TV Crime Drama Actress	Castle	Won	
