= For Lovers Only (film) =

- Promotional movie poster
- Directed by: Michael Polish
- Written by: Mark Polish
- Produced by: Polish brothers Sean O'Grady
- Starring: Stana Katic; Mark Polish
- Music by: Kubilai Uner
- Release date: May 29, 2011 (Film Festival Zlín)
- Running time: 87 minutes
- Country: United States
- Language: English

For Lovers Only is a 2011 romance film produced by the Polish brothers and Sean O'Grady. The brothers also had different roles in the film, with Michael as director and Mark as writer and also actor himself. The film also stars Stana Katic. It was expected to be released in theaters in the United States in June 2011, but eventually adopted an online distribution strategy.

== Plot ==
In the film, Katic plays Sofia, a journalist and former model, while Polish plays Yves, a former fashion photographer. Sofia chances upon Yves, her former lover, while on assignment. The story draws upon Claude Lelouch's A Man and a Woman and the French New Wave for inspiration and focuses on the couple's flight from Paris via a variety of forms of transportation: train, car and motorcycle. Their travels extend from Normandy to St. Tropez. Mark Polish notes that the film lies somewhere between A Man and a Woman and The Beatles' A Hard Day's Night. The film, which was shot in Paris and various locations throughout France, premiered for industry guests in Beverly Hills on September 29, 2010.

== Production ==
For Lovers Only was scored by Kubilai Uner. It is a black-and-white film. The film released as video on demand by In Demand in June. On Monday July 11, it ranked number 2 on the iTunes Store romance movies chart, number 4 on the iTunes independent films chart and was among the Top 100 in all movie rental and downloads. Using what is being described as a direct-to-iTunes strategy, it was atop the iTunes romance films for two weeks and in the top ten for four. After topping $500,000 in earnings through digital sales, the movie is expected to appear in United States theaters in the fall 2011.

The film, which was shot over a period of 12 days from a script that was more than a decade old, was promoted without an advertising budget via Twitter and Facebook. The film was shot using a Canon EOS 5D Mark II, which is a digital still photography camera, with video capability. Because of its traditional still photography appearance, they were able to film without attracting attention in public places. They did not use any artificial lighting in any scenes, except for a nightclub scene, where Michael's iPhone provided the lighting. The film was scored by friend Kubilay Uner. The film was classified as an experimental film by the Screen Actors Guild, which meant the Polish brothers did not have to pay Katic, who used her own wardrobe.

== Film festival showings ==
The film had its world premiere at the May 29 – June 5, 2011 Film Festival Zlín on opening night. One Zlin Festival critic compared the film to Richard Linklater's Before Sunset and Katic mentioned that she studied several François Truffaut works to prepare for her role. On August 7, 2011 the film was shown at the Transatlantyk Poznan International Film & Music Festival in Poland. It was also scheduled for the 2011 Oldenburg Film Festival. The film won the Bronze prize for Drama Feature Film at the September 13–15 Trinidad Independent Film Festival.
