= Jackpot (2001 film) =

2001 comedy-drama film by Michael Polish

- Theatrical release poster
- Directed by: Michael Polish
- Written by: Mark Polish; Michael Polish
- Produced by: Mark Polish; Michael Polish
- Starring: Jon Gries; Garrett Morris; Adam Baldwin; Patrick Bauchau; Crystal Bernard; Mac Davis; Anthony Edwards; Daryl Hannah; Peggy Lipton; Rick Overton
- Cinematography: M. David Mullen
- Edited by: Shawna Callahan
- Music by: Stuart Matthewman
- Distributed by: Sony Pictures Classics
- Release date: July 27, 2001
- Running time: 97 minutes
- Country: United States
- Language: English

Jackpot is a 2001 American comedy-drama film directed by Michael Polish and written by Michael and his brother, Mark Polish. It had a limited release in the United States on July 27, 2001.

== Plot ==
Sunny Holiday, an aspiring singer, abandons his wife and young daughter to embark on a tour of karaoke bars in search of the elusive big break that will catapult him to country music stardom. Living out of a pink Chrysler for months, he and his manager meet various strangers along the way, all of whom they inevitably alienate by trying to sell a concentrated household cleaner or committing some other faux pas. Eventually, the frustrations fueled by their many disappointments nearly tear their friendship apart, and they are forced to return to the lives they had left behind.

== Cast ==
- Jon Gries as Sunny Holiday/Glen Allen Johnson
- Daryl Hannah as Bobbi
- Garrett Morris as Lester Irving
- Patrick Bauchau as Santa Claus/Voice of Sevon
- Adam Baldwin as Mel James
- Peggy Lipton as Janice
- Crystal Bernard as Cheryl
- Ricky Trammell as Candy
- Anthony Edwards as Tracy
- Mac Davis as Sammy Bones

== Production ==
It was the first feature film shot on 24P HD and released in cinemas on 35mm film, using the Sony CineAlta F900.

== Reception ==
As of July 2020, the film holds a 29% approval rating on Rotten Tomatoes, based on 55 reviews with an average rating of 4.39/10. The website's critics consensus reads: "A somewhat aimless movie that's too artsy for its own good."

=== Accolades ===
Independent Spirit Awards

- Won: John Cassavetes Award, Michael Polish (director/producer/writer), Mark Polish (producer/writer) (2002)
- Nominated: Best Supporting Male, Garrett Morris (2002)

New American Cinema Award

- Won: Michael Polish
