= Twin Falls Idaho (film) =

- US film poster
- Directed by: Michael Polish
- Written by: Mark Polish; Michael Polish
- Produced by: Marshall Persinger; Rena Ronson; Steven J. Wolfe
- Starring: Mark Polish; Michael Polish; Michele Hicks; Jon Gries; Patrick Bauchau; Garrett Morris; William Katt; Lesley Ann Warren
- Cinematography: M. David Mullen
- Edited by: Leo Trombetta
- Music by: Stuart Matthewman
- Distributed by: Sony Pictures Classics
- Release dates: January 24, 1999 (Sundance); July 30, 1999 (United States)
- Running time: 110 minutes
- Country: United States
- Language: English
- Budget: $500,000
- Box office: $985,341

Twin Falls Idaho is a 1999 independent drama directed by Michael Polish, who co-wrote and co-stars in the film with Mark Polish. It premiered at the 1999 Sundance Film Festival and was acquired by Sony Pictures Classics, who gave the film a limited release on July 30, 1999.

== Plot ==
The film portrays the lives of shy conjoined twins Blake and Francis Falls, who take residence in a rundown hotel to hopefully reunite with their estranged birth mother. They find their gateway to the outside world through an eccentric young prostitute named Penny. They agree to attend a Halloween party with Penny and pretend to be wearing a "Siamese Twins" costume.

The rest of the movie involves the brothers dealing with Francis's health problems, the changing relationship between the brothers, and Blake's budding relationship with Penny. Ultimately, Francis's health deteriorates too far and the twins have to be separated. Francis is too sick to survive and dies, but Blake survives and must begin a life apart from his twin. Penny visits him and the two start a relationship.

== Cast ==
- Mark Polish as Francis
- Michael Polish as Blake
- Michele Hicks as Penny
- Jon Gries as Lawyer Jay Harrison
- Patrick Bauchau as Miles, a Doctor
- Garrett Morris as Jesus
- William Katt as Surgeon
- Lesley Anne Warren as Francine
- Teresa Hill as Sissy
- Ant as Tre
- Sasha Alexander as Miss America
- Holly Woodlawn as Flamboyant at Party
- Mary-Pat Green as Nurse

== Reception ==
The film has an 80% "Fresh" rating on Rotten Tomatoes based on 45 critics’ reviews. Metacritic, which uses a weighted average, assigned the film a score of 71 out of 100, based on 28 critics, indicating "generally favorable" reviews.

Critic Roger Ebert gave the film four out of four stars, writing "It is one of those films not much interested in plot, but is fascinated by what it is like to be somebody, or two somebodies. The movie doesn't depend on special effects to create a shared body..and instead uses the performances." He added, "We can imagine [the brothers’] lifetime of isolation from the normal things people do", and concluded "In its quiet, dark, claustrophobic way, this is one of the best films of the year."

Janet Maslin of The New York Times said, "It's a film that dwells as hauntingly on loneliness as it does on never actually being able to be alone", and that Mark Polish gives an "especially affecting performance.”

=== Accolades ===
At the 1999 Deauville American Film Festival, Twin Falls Idaho was honored with the CinéLive Award, the Fun Radio Trophy, and the Jury Special Prize (tied with Sarah Polley’s Guinevere). It also won the Audience Award at the Athens International Film Festival and was nominated for an Open Palm Award at the Gotham Awards. The film received a Special Recognition notice from the National Board of Review for excellence in filmmaking.
