= List of awards and nominations received by Norman Jewison =

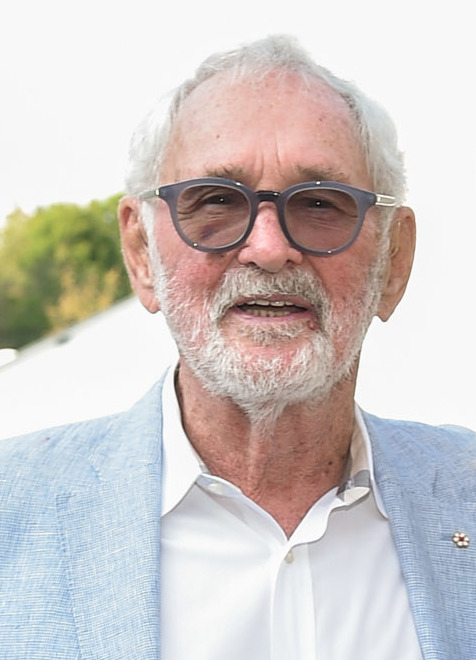
Norman Jewison in 2019

This article is a list of awards and nominations received by Norman Jewison.

Norman Jewison received the Academy of Motion Pictures Arts and Sciences's Irving G. Thalberg Memorial Award in 1999. He received a BAFTA Award and was nominated for 7 Academy Awards and three Golden Globe Awards. He was nominated for the Academy Award for Best Director three times in three separate decades for In the Heat of the Night (1967), Fiddler on the Roof (1971) and Moonstruck (1987).

The Thalberg award was one of many honours Jewison has been awarded, including Honorary Degrees from Trent, Western Ontario and the University of Toronto, and he was made a Companion of the Order of Canada in 1992. Also in 1992, Jewison received the Ramon John Hnatyshyn Award for Voluntarism in the Performing Arts, a companion award of the Governor General's Performing Arts Awards, Canada's highest honour in the performing arts.

In 1971, he was the subject of the award-winning National Film Board of Canada documentary Norman Jewison, Film Maker. In addition, he has received numerous tributes at Canadian and international film festivals and retrospectives, and has been given a star on the Hollywood Walk of Fame and Canada's Walk of Fame. In 2001, a park in downtown Toronto was named after him. In 2003, Jewison received the Governor General's Performing Arts Award for Lifetime Artistic Achievement for his lifetime contribution to film in Canada. On January 30, 2010, Jewison received a lifetime achievement award from the Directors Guild of America at the 62nd Annual DGA Awards, held at the Century Plaza in Los Angeles.

== Major associations ==
=== Academy Awards ===
Year	Category	Nominated work	Result	Ref.
1966	Best Picture	The Russians Are Coming, the Russians Are Coming	Nominated	
1967	Best Director	In the Heat of the Night	Nominated	
1971	Best Picture	Fiddler on the Roof	Nominated	
1971	Best Director	Fiddler on the Roof	Nominated	
1984	Best Picture	A Soldier's Story	Nominated	
1987	Best Picture	Moonstruck	Nominated	
1987	Best Director	Moonstruck	Nominated	
1999	Irving G. Thalberg Memorial Award		Won	

=== BAFTA Awards ===
Year	Category	Nominated work	Result	Ref.
1967	Best Film – Any Source	In the Heat of the Night	Nominated	
1967	United Nations Award	In the Heat of the Night	Won	

=== Emmy Award ===
Year	Category	Nominated work	Result	Ref.
2002	Outstanding Television Movie	Dinner with Friends	Nominated	

=== Golden Globe Awards ===
Year	Category	Nominated work	Result	Ref.
1967	Best Director	In the Heat of the Night	Nominated	
1971	Best Director	Fiddler on the Roof	Nominated	
1999	Best Director	The Hurricane	Nominated	

== Industry awards ==
=== Berlin International Film Festival ===
Year	Category	Nominated work	Result	Ref.
1987	Silver Bear for Best Director	Moonstruck	Won	

=== Moscow International Film Festival ===
Year	Category	Nominated work	Result	Ref.
1985	Golden Prize	A Soldier's Story	Won	

=== New York Film Critics Circle ===
Year	Category	Nominated work	Result	Ref.
1971	Best Direction	Fiddler on the Roof	Nominated	
1971	Best Film	Fiddler on the Roof	Nominated	
1967	Best Film	In the Heat of the Night	Won	
1967	Best Direction	In the Heat of the Night	Nominated	

== Academy Award performances by actors ==
Year	Performer	Film	Result
Academy Award for Best Actor
1967	Alan Arkin	The Russians Are Coming the Russians Are Coming	Nominated
1968	Rod Steiger	In the Heat of the Night	Won
1972	Chaim Topol	Fiddler on the Roof	Nominated
1980	Al Pacino	...And Justice for All	Nominated
2000	Denzel Washington	The Hurricane	Nominated
Academy Award for Best Supporting Actor
1972	Leonard Frey	Fiddler on the Roof	Nominated
1985	Adolph Caesar	A Soldier's Story	Nominated
1988	Vincent Gardenia	Moonstruck	Nominated
Academy Award for Best Actress
1986	Anne Bancroft	Agnes of God	Nominated
1988	Cher	Moonstruck	Won
Academy Award for Best Supporting Actress
1986	Meg Tilly	Agnes of God	Nominated
1988	Olympia Dukakis	Moonstruck	Won

== Miscellaneous accolades ==
- American Cinema Editors Golden Eddie Award (2008)
- Directors Guild of Canada Lifetime Achievement Award (2002)
- Windsor International Film Festival Lifetime Achievement Award (2014)

== Special honours ==
Ribbon	Description	Notes
	Order of Canada (CC)	Companion 1992; Officer 1982
	Order of Ontario (O. Ont)	Member 1989
	1939-45 Star	For Service with the Royal Canadian Navy during World War II
	Defence Medal	For Service with the Royal Canadian Navy during World War II
	Canadian Volunteer Service Medal	For Service with the Royal Canadian Navy during World War II; With Overseas Clasp
	1939-45 War Medal	For Service with the Royal Canadian Navy during World War II
	125th Anniversary of the Confederation of Canada Medal	1992
	Queen Elizabeth II Golden Jubilee Medal	2002: Canadian Version of this Medal
	Queen Elizabeth II Diamond Jubilee Medal	2012: Canadian Version of this Medal
