= Norman Jewison =

Canadian filmmaker (1926–2024)

Norman Jewison CC OOnt
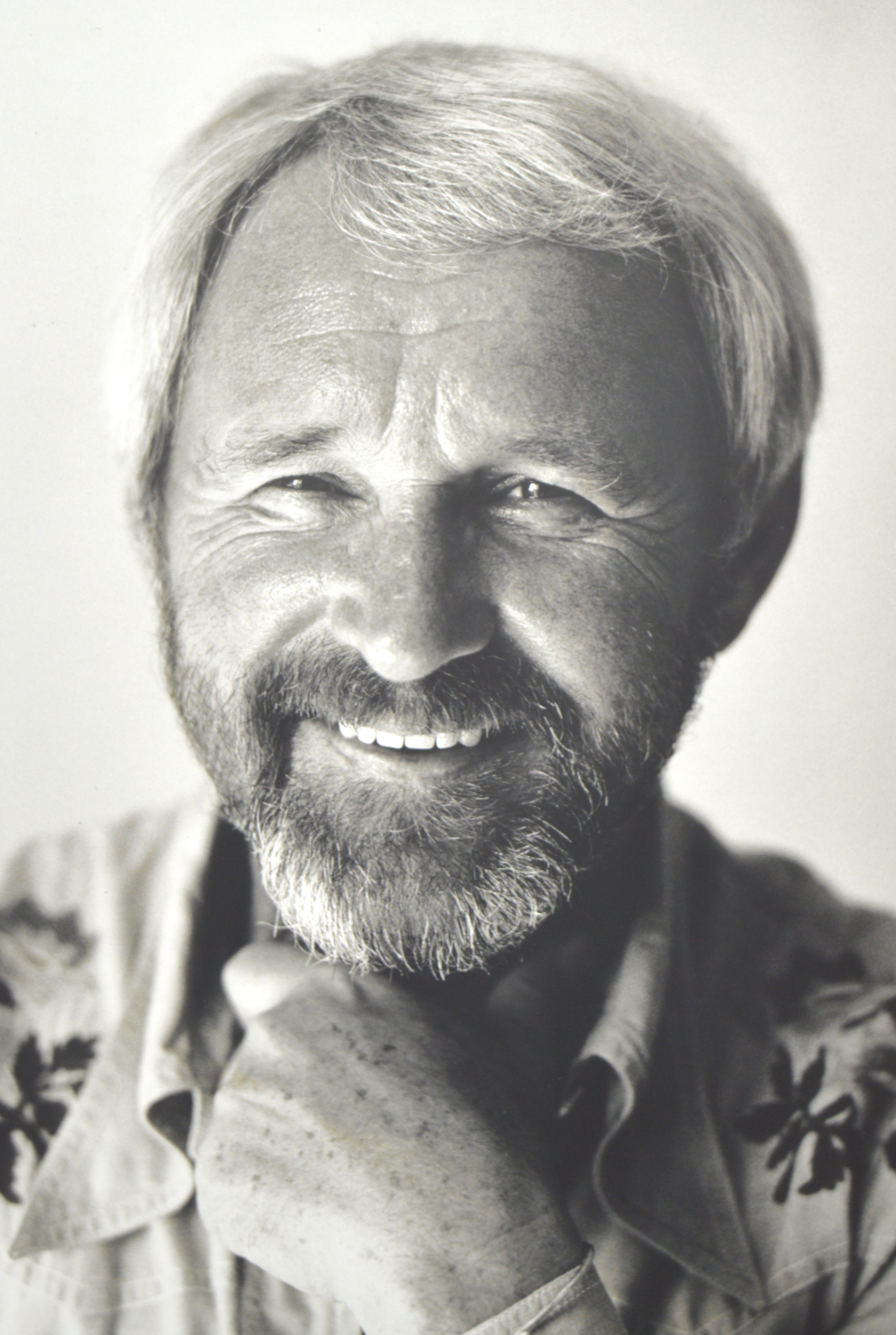

13th Chancellor of Victoria University, Toronto
- In office 2004–2010
- President: Paul W. Gooch
- Preceded by: Kenneth D. Taylor
- Succeeded by: Wendy Marion Cecil

Personal details
- Born: Norman Frederick Jewison; July 21, 1926 Toronto, Ontario, Canada
- Died: January 20, 2024 (aged 97) Malibu, California, U.S.
- Spouses: Margaret Ann Dixon (m. 1953; died 2004); Lynne St. David (m. 2010)
- Children: 3
- Education: Victoria College, Toronto (B.A., 1949)
- Occupation: Director; producer; screenwriter
- Awards: Full list
- Military career
- Allegiance: Canada
- Branch: Royal Canadian Navy
- Service years: 1944–1945
- Conflicts: World War II

Norman Frederick Jewison (July 21, 1926 – January 20, 2024) was a Canadian filmmaker. He is known for directing films which addressed topical social and political issues, often making controversial or complicated subjects accessible to mainstream audiences. Among numerous other accolades, he was nominated for the Academy Award for Best Director three times in three separate decades, for In the Heat of the Night (1967), Fiddler on the Roof (1971) and Moonstruck (1987). He was nominated for an additional four Oscars, three Golden Globe Awards and a Primetime Emmy Award, and won a BAFTA Award. He received the Academy of Motion Pictures Arts and Sciences's Irving G. Thalberg Memorial Award in 1999.

Born and raised in Toronto, Jewison began his career at CBC Television in the 1950s, moving to the United States later in the decade to work at NBC. He made his feature film debut in 1962, with the comedy 40 Pounds of Trouble, and embarked on a motion picture directing career that spanned over 40 years. His notable films included The Cincinnati Kid (1965), The Russians Are Coming, the Russians Are Coming (1966), The Thomas Crown Affair (1968), Jesus Christ Superstar (1973), Rollerball (1975), F.I.S.T. (1978), ...And Justice for All (1979), A Soldier's Story (1984), Agnes of God (1985) and The Hurricane (1999).

In 1988, Jewison founded the Canadian Film Centre. In 2003, he received the Governor General's Performing Arts Award for Lifetime Artistic Achievement for his multiple contributions to the film industry in Canada. He was Chancellor of Victoria University in the University of Toronto, his alma mater, from 2004 until 2010.

For four decades, he worked out of a fifth-floor office in his home at 18 Gloucester Street, a former furniture factory. In 2001, City of Toronto honored Jewison by naming Norman Jewison Park across the street in his honor. In 2023, the Hazelton Hotel named its screening room after him.

== Early life and education ==
Jewison was born in Toronto, Ontario, the son of Percy Joseph Jewison (1890–1974), who managed a convenience store and post office, and Dorothy Irene (née Weaver). He attended Kew Beach School and Malvern Collegiate Institute, and while growing up in the 1930s displayed an aptitude for performing and theatre. He was often mistaken for being Jewish due to his surname and direction of Fiddler on the Roof, but he and his family were in fact Methodists of English descent. He served in the Royal Canadian Navy for a year during World War II (1944–1945), and after being discharged travelled in the American South, where he encountered segregation, an experience that influenced his later work.

Jewison attended Victoria College in the University of Toronto, graduating with a B.A. in 1949. As a student, he was involved in writing, directing and acting in various theatrical productions, including the All-Varsity Revue in 1949. Following graduation, he moved to London England, where he worked sporadically as a script writer for a children's television program and bit part actor for the BBC, while supporting himself with odd jobs. Out of work in Britain in late 1951, he returned to Canada to become a production trainee at CBLT in Toronto, which was preparing for the launch of CBC Television.

== Career ==
=== 1952–1964: Early work ===
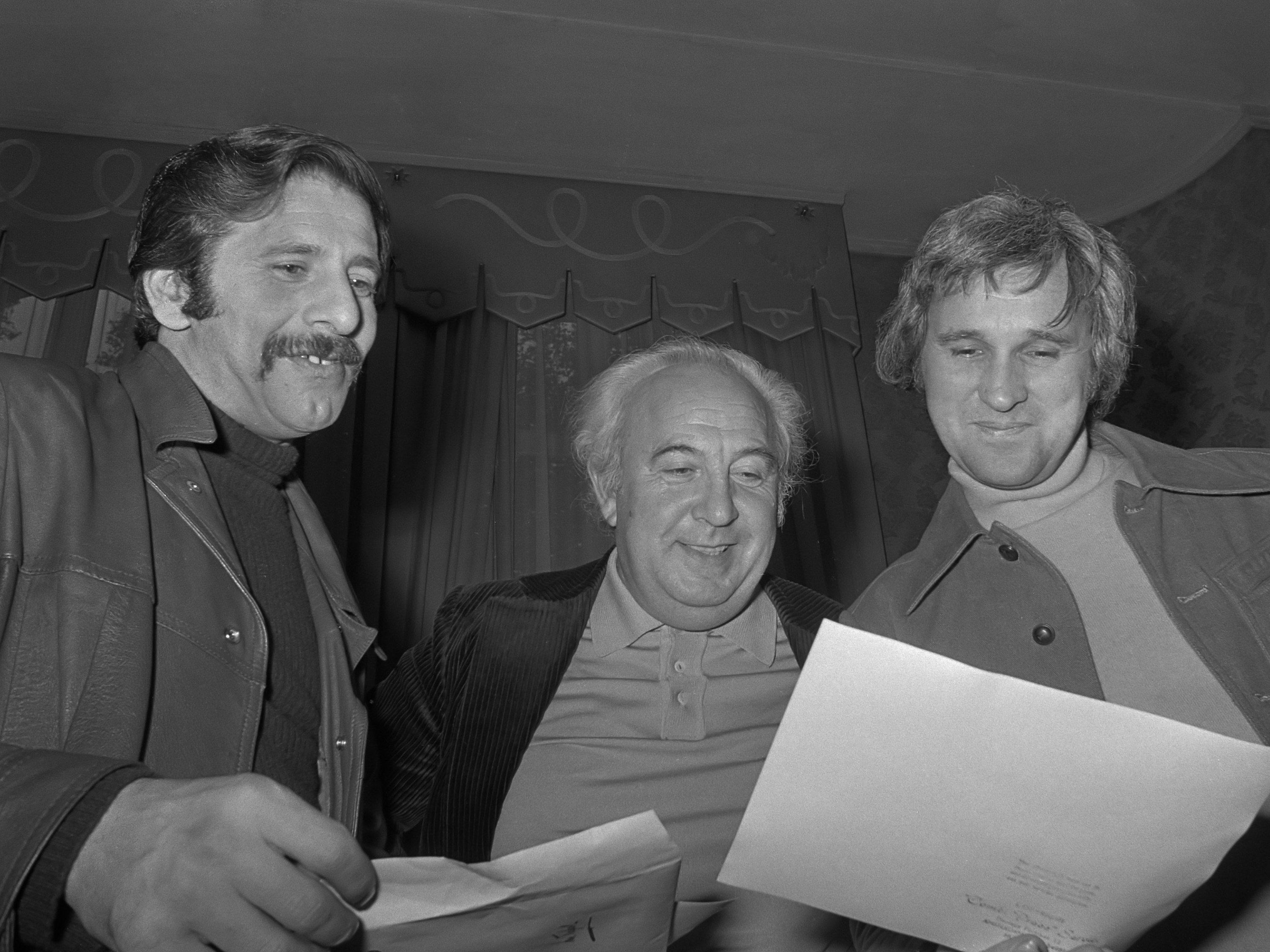
From left to right: Chaim Topol, Lex Goudsmit and Jewison in 1971

When CBC Television went on the air in the fall of 1952, Jewison was an assistant director. During the next seven years he wrote, directed and produced a wide variety of musicals, comedy-variety shows, dramas and specials, including The Big Revue, Showtime and The Barris Beat. In 1953 he married Margaret Ann "Dixie" Dixon, a former model. They had three children—Michael, Kevin and Jennifer—who all pursued careers in the entertainment industry. In 1958 Jewison was recruited to work for NBC in New York, where his first assignment was Your Hit Parade, followed by The Andy Williams Show. The success of these shows led to directing specials featuring performers such as Harry Belafonte, Jackie Gleason and Danny Kaye. The television production that proved pivotal to Jewison's career was the Judy Garland "comeback" special that aired in 1961, which included Frank Sinatra and Dean Martin, and led to a weekly show that Jewison was later called in to direct. Visiting the studio during rehearsal for the special, actor Tony Curtis suggested to Jewison that he should direct a feature film.

Jewison's career as a film director began when Tony Curtis' and Janet Leigh's film production company, Curtleigh Productions, hired him to direct the comedy 40 Pounds of Trouble in February 1962. The film was financed and distributed by Universal-International Pictures and was the first motion picture ever filmed at Disneyland. Curtleigh Productions' contract with Jewison had a negotiable option for further films if the initial picture was successful. In early October 1962, Jewison formed his own independent film production company, Simkoe Productions, and signed a two-picture deal with Curtis' new film production company, Curtis Enterprises, as well as an additional two-picture deal with Universal-International Pictures. Although the two pictures for Curtis Enterprises were not made, both films for Universal-International Pictures were. He made two comedies starring Doris Day: The Thrill of It All, released in 1963 and co-starring James Garner, and Send Me No Flowers, released in 1964 and co-starring Rock Hudson. After another comedy, The Art of Love (1965), Jewison was determined to escape from the genre and tackle more demanding projects.

=== 1965–1987: Breakthrough and acclaim ===
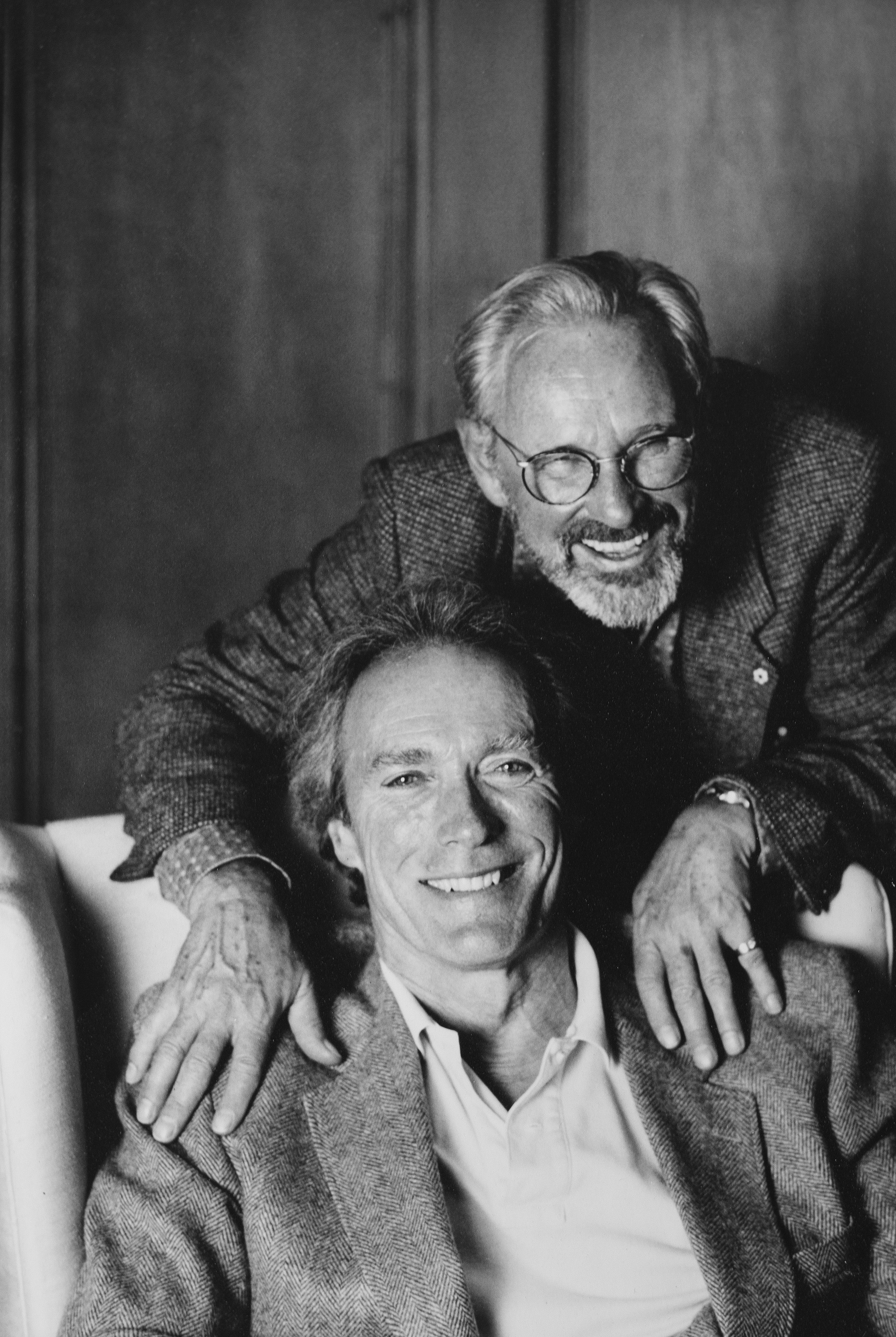
Clint Eastwood with Jewison in 1987

His breakthrough film proved to be The Cincinnati Kid (1965), a drama starring Steve McQueen, and Jewison considered it one of his personal favourites because it was his first challenging drama. This success was followed in 1966 by a satire on Cold War paranoia, The Russians Are Coming, the Russians Are Coming; it was the first film Jewison also produced, and it was nominated for four Academy Awards, including Best Picture. He felt that doing "a plea for coexistence, or the absurdity of international conflict was important right at that moment". While reaction to Russians was positive, Jewison was labelled as "a Canadian pinko" by right-wing commentators.

Continuing his string of successes was one of the films that has become closely identified with Jewison as its director, In the Heat of the Night (1967), a crime drama set in a racially divided Southern town and starring Sidney Poitier and Rod Steiger, which won five Academy Awards, including Best Picture, while Jewison was nominated for Best Director. While he was filming, Robert Kennedy told Jewison that this could be "a very important film. Timing is everything". Kennedy reminded Jewison of that prediction a year and a half later when he presented him with the Critics' Choice Movie Award for best drama. As a follow-up he directed and produced another film with McQueen, using innovative multiple screen images in the crime caper The Thomas Crown Affair (1968). From that point Jewison produced all feature films he directed, often with associate Patrick Palmer, and he also acted as producer for films directed by others, beginning with his former film editor Hal Ashby's directorial debut The Landlord (1970). After the completion of the period comedy Gaily, Gaily (1969), Jewison, having become disenchanted with the political climate in the United States, moved his family to England.

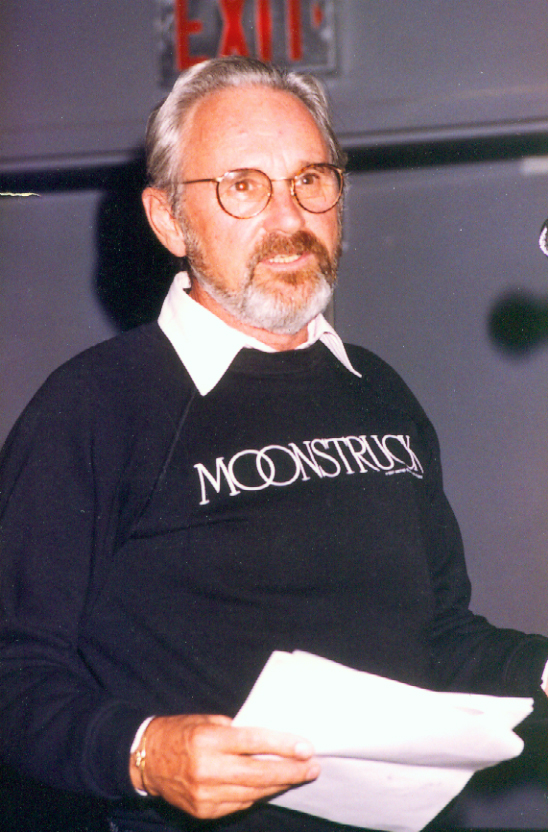
Jewison in 1987

At Pinewood Studios northwest of London, and on location in Yugoslavia, he worked on the musical Fiddler on the Roof (1971, re-issued 1979), which won three Oscars and was nominated for five others, including Best Picture and Director. During the filming of Fiddler, Jewison was also the subject of the 1971 National Film Board of Canada documentary, Norman Jewison, Filmmaker, directed by Douglas Jackson. Jewison's next project was the musical Jesus Christ Superstar (1973), based on the Broadway musical written by Andrew Lloyd Webber and Tim Rice. It was filmed in Israel, where Jewison also produced the western Billy Two Hats (1974), starring Gregory Peck. Superstar, controversial for its treatment of a religious subject, was followed by another movie that sparked critical debate, this time over violence. Rollerball (1975) is set in the near future when corporations rule the world and entertainment is centred around a deadly game. The next film he directed, the labour union drama F.I.S.T. (1978), loosely based on the life of Jimmy Hoffa, also provided some controversy, this time regarding the screenwriting credit. Screenwriter Joe Eszterhas was unhappy to share the screenwriting credit with the film's star Sylvester Stallone, as he felt that Stallone's input had been minor, while Stallone claimed to have basically rewritten the whole script.

In 1978 Jewison returned to Canada, settling in the Caledon area in Ontario and establishing a farm that produced prizewinning cattle, as well as maple syrup. Operating from a base in Toronto, as well as one maintained in California, he directed high-profile actors Al Pacino in ...And Justice for All (1979), and Burt Reynolds and Goldie Hawn in the romantic comedy Best Friends (1982), and he produced The Dogs of War (1981) and Iceman (1984). During this period Jewison also produced the 53rd Annual Academy Awards (1981), which was slated to air the day President Ronald Reagan was shot and had to be rescheduled. Revisiting the theme of racial tension that had characterised In the Heat of the Night, Jewison's A Soldier's Story (1984), based on a Pulitzer Prize winning play, was nominated for three Academy Awards, including Best Picture. His next film was also based on a successful play. Agnes of God (1985), set in a Quebec convent, starred Jane Fonda, Meg Tilly and Anne Bancroft; it received three Academy Award nominations. In 1986, he then discontinued the agreement with film producer Columbia Pictures, citing the behaviour of British filmmaker and head of production David Puttnam. After the falling out with Columbia, his Yorktown Productions company was moved to Metro-Goldwyn-Mayer for a three-year agreement to direct, produce and develop pictures from the studio, and gave MGM the right of first refusal on films he wished to make. Jewison's next film proved to be one of the most popular romantic films ever made. Moonstruck (1987), starring Cher, was a box office hit that garnered three Academy Awards, including Best Actress for Cher. Jewison also received his third Best Director nomination.

=== 1988–2001 ===
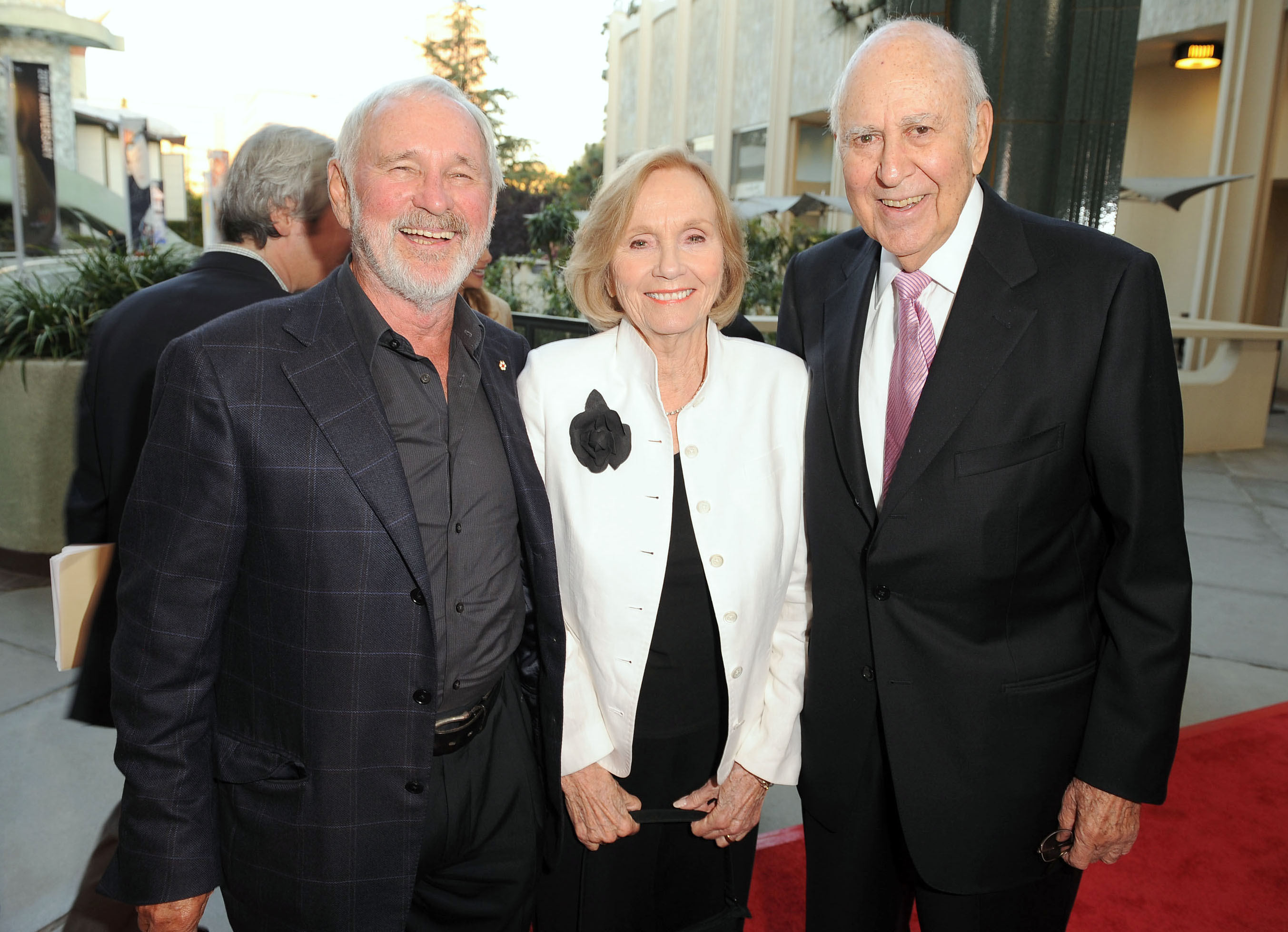
Jewison, Eva Marie Saint and Carl Reiner in 2009

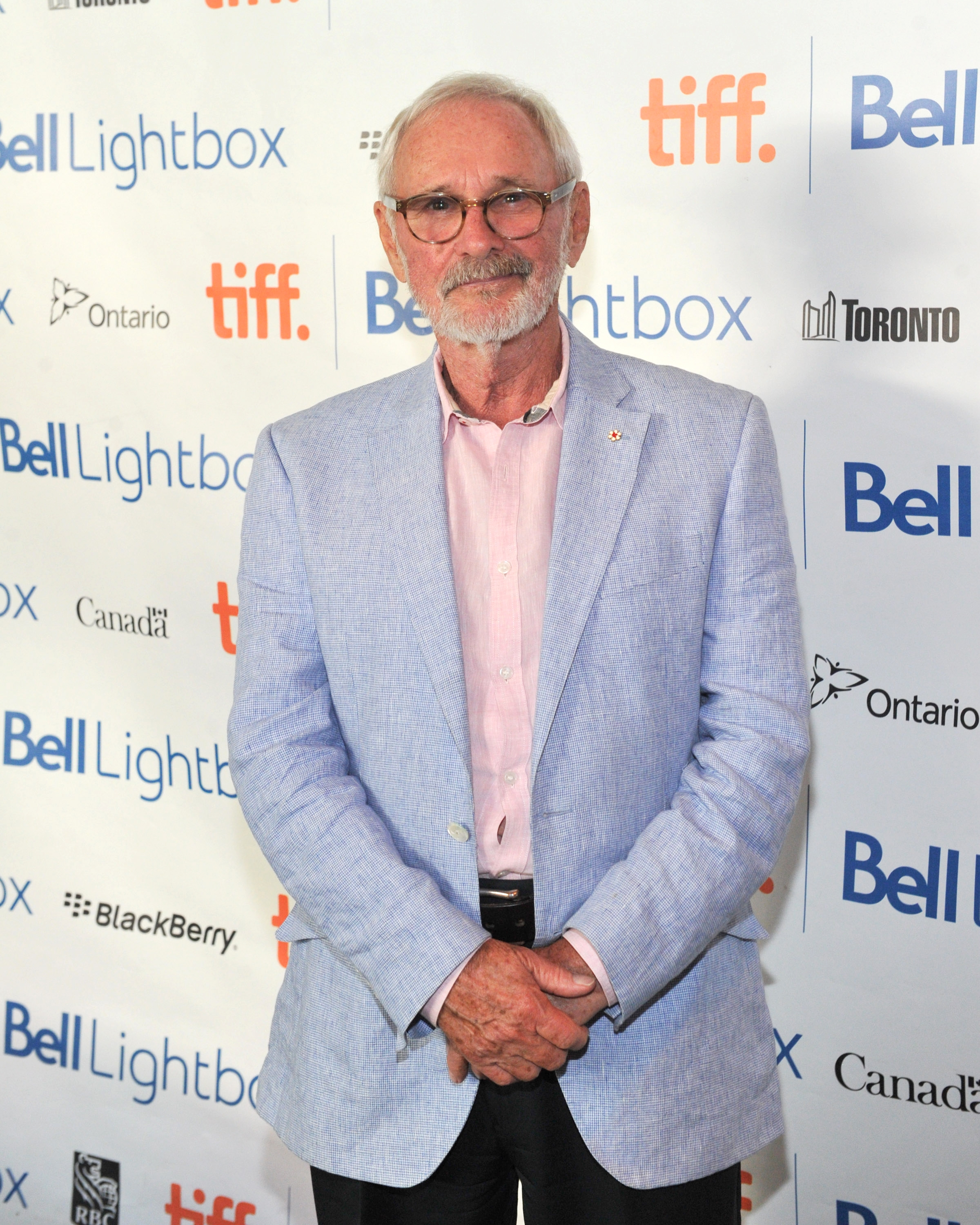
Jewison at the Toronto International Film Festival in 2011

For the next decade Jewison continued to direct feature films released by major studios: In Country (1989), a drama concerned with Vietnam veterans and the daughter of a war casualty; Other People's Money (1991), a social comedy about greed in the 1980s; Only You (1994), a romantic comedy set in Italy; and Bogus (1996), a fantasy about a young boy and his imaginary friend. He also served as producer for the film January Man (1989), executive producer for the Canadian movie Dance Me Outside, and branched back into television both as director and producer, including the TNT biographical film Geronimo (1993) and the series The Rez (1996–1998).

The Hurricane (1999) was Jewison's third film to explore the effects of racism, telling the story of boxer Rubin "Hurricane" Carter, who had been falsely convicted for a triple murder in New Jersey during the mid-1960s. Denzel Washington won a Golden Globe and was nominated for an Oscar for his portrayal of Carter. In 1999, Jewison's work was recognised by The Academy of Motion Picture Arts and Sciences when he was given the Irving G. Thalberg Memorial Award for lifetime achievement. Jewison continued directing and producing up until his last film to be released, the 2003 thriller The Statement, based on a novel by Brian Moore starring Michael Caine. That same year his autobiography This Terrible Business Has Been Good to Me was published, expressing the enthusiasm, conviction and creative passion that sustained his career.

In 1999, he directed the HBO television movie Dinner with Friends starring Andie MacDowell, Greg Kinnear, Toni Collette and Dennis Quaid. The film was based on the play of the same name by Donald Margulies. Jewison was nominated for the Primetime Emmy Award for Outstanding Television Movie.

Describing the key characteristic of the films he made, he once said: "I want people to recognise themselves in the movies I make. I don't enjoy no-brainer action movies."

== Canadian Film Centre ==
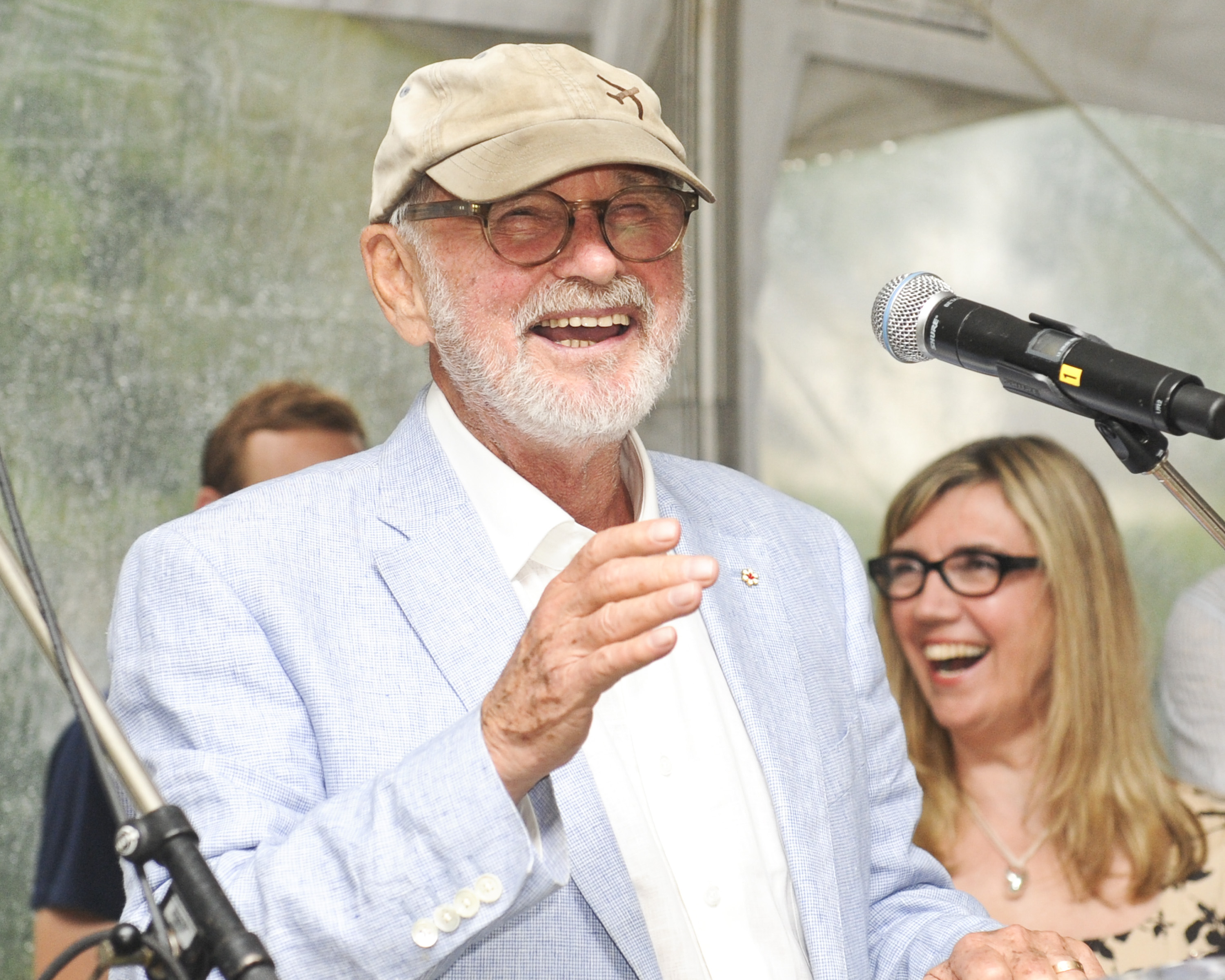
Jewison at a CFC Garden Party in 2012

Jewison's commitment and contribution to film in Canada is evidenced by his creation of the Canadian Centre for Advanced Film Studies in 1986, which opened two years later as an advanced film school on Windfields Estate in Toronto, Ontario. This was subsequently renamed the Canadian Film Centre (CFC).

More than 1,700 alumni and 100 alumni companies have come out of CFC's programs to date, including Shaftesbury Films, Conquering Lion Pictures, CopperHeart Entertainment, Smiley Guy Studios and Secret Location. The centre has helped incubate and/or develop groundbreaking original content, including hit television series Orphan Black (from creators Graeme Manson and John Fawcett, CFC alumni), the award-winning first feature Closet Monster (from writer/director alumnus Stephen Dunn), and internationally award-winning documentary feature Stories We Tell (from director and CFC alumna Sarah Polley).

Additionally, feature films such as Rhymes for Young Ghouls (director Jeff Barnaby), Cube (director Vincenzo Natali) and Rude (director Clement Virgo) have been developed and produced through CFC Features.

Each year in Los Angeles, Jewison bestowed the CFC Award for Creative Excellence to CFC alumni in recognition of their outstanding work and contributions to the screen-based entertainment industry. Jewison presented the inaugural award to CFC alumna Semi Chellas (Mad Men) in 2014, to Graeme Manson and John Fawcett (Orphan Black) in 2015, and to Don McKellar (The Red Violin, Highway 61) in 2016.

Jewison was the Chair Emeritus of the CFC.

== Personal life ==
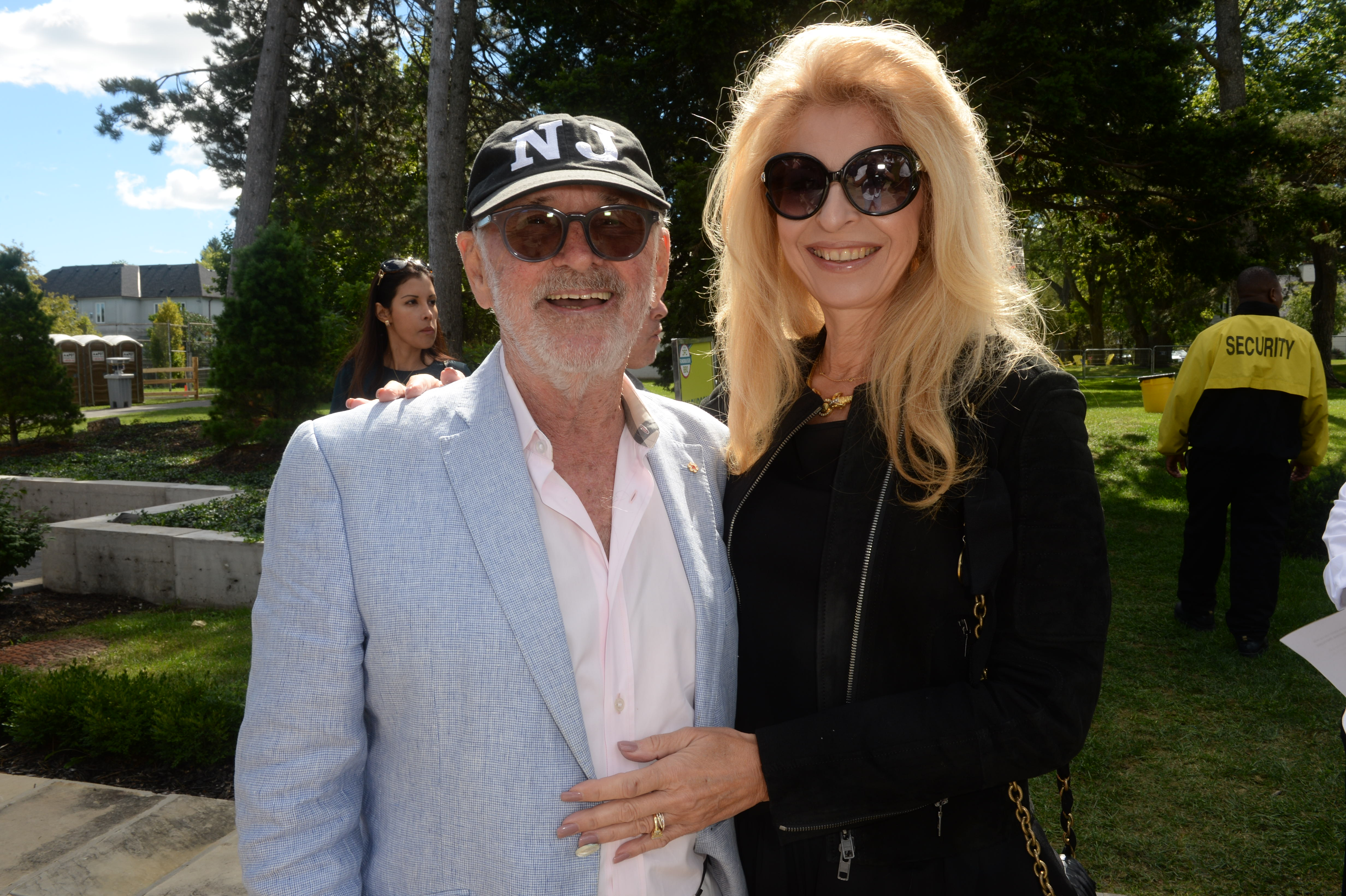
Jewison and wife Lynne St. David-Jewison in September 2016

Norman Jewison and Margaret Ann Dixon married on July 11, 1953. She died on November 26, 2004, the day following her 74th birthday, in Orangeville, Ontario, from cancer. They had three children and five grandchildren.

In recognition of his contributions to the arts, as well as his sustained support, Jewison was installed as Chancellor of Victoria University in the University of Toronto in 2004; he held the position until October 2010.

In 2010, Blake Goldring donated CA$1.0 million (equivalent to $1.4 million in 2025) to Victoria University at the University of Toronto to establish a specialised first-year liberal arts program in Jewison's name. The program began in September 2011, welcoming fewer than 30 select students into Norman Jewison Stream for Imagination and the Arts. Goldring is a 1981 graduate of the school.

Also in 2010, Jewison married Lynne St. David, whom he had begun dating in 2008. However, Jewison reportedly carried on an affair with St. David while his first wife Dixie was still alive, and Dixie found out but did not have the strength to fight it.

=== Death ===
Jewison died in his Malibu home on January 20, 2024, at age 97.

Jewison's $30 million estate was originally to be divided among his three children; however, two months before his death the will was changed to give the bulk of his fortune to his second wife St. David. As a result, Jewison's children sued St. David, arguing that Jewison lacked the mental capacity to make financial decisions after suffering strokes in 2010 and that St. David exerted undue influence for her own gain and alleging that she had progressively cut him off from friends and family starting in 2010. The legal disputes were settled through mediation.

== Filmography ==
=== Film ===
Year	Title	Functioned as		Notes
Year	Title	Director	Producer	Notes
1962	40 Pounds of Trouble	Yes	No	
1963	The Thrill of It All	Yes	No	
1964	Send Me No Flowers	Yes	No	
1965	The Art of Love	Yes	No	
1965	The Cincinnati Kid	Yes	No	
1966	The Russians Are Coming, the Russians Are Coming	Yes	Yes	
1967	In the Heat of the Night	Yes	No	
1968	The Thomas Crown Affair	Yes	Yes	
1969	Gaily, Gaily	Yes	Yes	
1971	Fiddler on the Roof	Yes	Yes	
1973	Jesus Christ Superstar	Yes	Yes	Also screenwriter
1975	Rollerball	Yes	Yes	
1978	F.I.S.T.	Yes	Yes	
1979	...And Justice for All	Yes	Yes	
1982	Best Friends	Yes	Yes	
1984	A Soldier's Story	Yes	Yes	
1985	Agnes of God	Yes	Yes	
1987	Moonstruck	Yes	Yes	
1989	In Country	Yes	Yes	
1991	Other People's Money	Yes	Yes	
1994	Only You	Yes	Yes	
1996	Bogus	Yes	Yes	
1999	The Hurricane	Yes	Yes	
2003	The Statement	Yes	Yes	

==== Producer only ====
- The Landlord (1970)
- Billy Two Hats (1974)
- The Dogs of War (1980)
- Iceman (1984)
- The January Man (1989)

==== Executive producer only ====
- Dance Me Outside (1994)

==== Acting roles ====
Year	Title	Role	Notes
1949	Canadian Pacific	Joe Podge	Uncredited
1970	The Landlord	Wedding Guest	Uncredited
1971	Fiddler on the Roof	Rabbi in 'Tevye's Dream' (voice)	Uncredited
1973	Jesus Christ Superstar	Old Man by Fire (voice)	Uncredited
1996	The Stupids	TV Director	
1997	An Alan Smithee Film: Burn Hollywood Burn	Himself	Uncredited

Ref.:

=== Television ===
Year	Title	Functioned as			Notes
Year	Title	Director	Producer	Executive Producer	Notes
1952	Let's See	No	Yes	No	
1952–53	The Big Revue	Yes	No	Yes	
1954	On Stage	No	Yes	No	
1954	The Denny Vaughan Show	Yes	No	No	
1955	The Wayne and Shuster Show	Yes	No	No	
1956–57	The Barris Beat	Yes	Yes	No	
1958	The Adventures of Chich	Yes	No	No	
1958–59	Your Hit Parade	Yes	No	No	
1959	The Chevy Showroom Starring Andy Williams	Yes	No	No	
1959	The Big Party	Yes	No	No	
1959	The Revlon Revue	Yes	Yes	No	
1963	The Judy Garland Show	Yes	Yes	Yes	
1994–95	Picture Windows	Yes	No	Yes	Directed 1 episode
1996–98	The Rez	No	No	Yes	19 episodes

==== TV specials ====
Year	Title	Functioned as	
Year	Title	Director	Producer
1960	The Fabulous Fifties	Yes	No
1960	An Hour with Danny Kaye	Yes	No
1960	Belafonte, New York 19	Yes	No
1961	Bulova Watch Time with Pat Boone	Yes	No
1962	The Broadway of Lerner and Loewe	Yes	Yes
1981	The 53rd Academy Awards	No	Yes

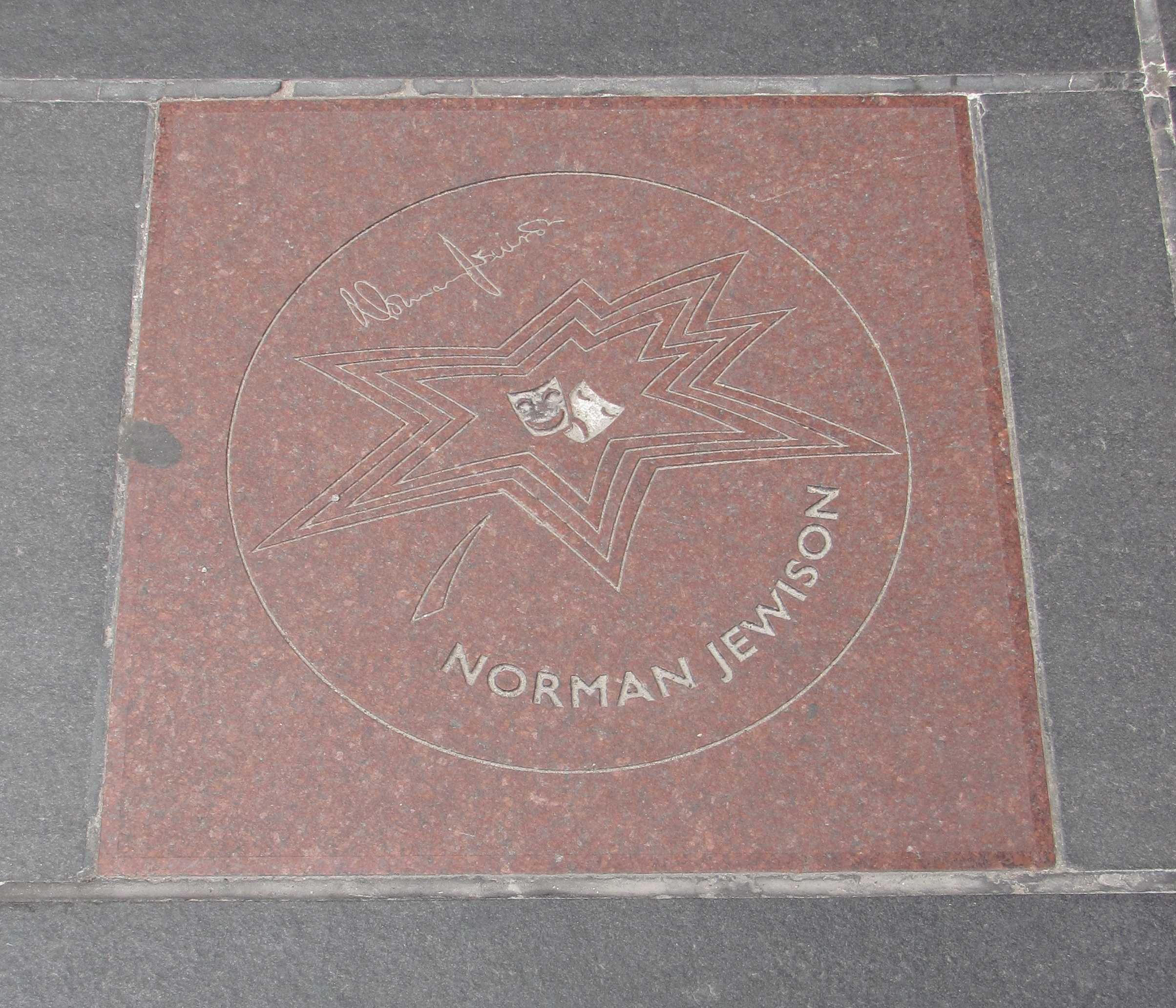
Jewison's star on Canada's Walk of Fame

==== TV movies and miniseries ====
Year	Title	Functioned as		
Year	Title	Director	Producer	Executive Producer
1960	The Secret World of Eddie Hodges	Yes	Yes	No
1961	The Million Dollar Incident	Yes	No	No
1993	Geronimo	No	No	Yes
2001	Dinner with Friends	Yes	No	Yes
2001	Walter and Henry	No	No	Yes

Ref.:

== Achievements and honours ==
Jewison was nominated for the Academy Award for Best Director three times in three separate decades for In the Heat of the Night (1967), Fiddler on the Roof (1971) and Moonstruck (1987). He also won the prestigious Silver Bear for Best Director at the Berlin Film Festival and earned Lifetime Achievement Awards from the Directors Guilds of both Canada and America. He also won a BAFTA Award. In 1981, he received the Order of Canada.

Year	Work	Academy Awards		BAFTA Awards		Golden Globe Awards		Refs
Year	Work	Nominations	Wins	Nominations	Wins	Nominations	Wins	Refs
1965	The Cincinnati Kid					1		
1966	The Russians Are Coming, the Russians Are Coming	4		2		5	2	
1967	In the Heat of the Night	7	5	4	2	7	3	
1968	The Thomas Crown Affair	2	1	1		2	1	
1969	Gaily, Gaily	3						
1971	Fiddler on the Roof	8	3	3		4	2	
1973	Jesus Christ Superstar	1		4	1	6		
1975	Rollerball			4	1			
1979	...And Justice for All	2				1		
1982	Best Friends	1				1		
1984	A Soldier's Story	3				3		
1985	Agnes of God	3				2	1	
1987	Moonstruck	6	3	4		5	2	
1989	In Country					1		
1999	The Hurricane	1				3	1	
Total		41	12	22	4	41	12	
