= Online high schools in California =

The state of California offers online learning for grades 9–12. Over 56,000 of students are taking one or more online classes in California, according to the reports California Department of Education. There are two types of online high school available in California.

== Private online high school ==
- Stanford Online High School
- San Diego Virtual School
- International Virtual Learning Academy
- Laurel Springs School
- Forest Trail Academy
- Halstrom High School Online
- National University Virtual High School
- Orange Lutheran High School Online
- Global Village School
- Sycamore Academy
- Allied High School
- North Star Academy
- The Keystone School
- James Madison High School
- Excel High School
- Penn Foster High School
- K12 International Academy
- National High School
- Apex Learning Virtual School

== Public online high school ==
- California Pacific Charter Schools - https://www.cal-pacs.org/
- Sage Oak Charter Schools
- California Virtual Academies
- Choice 2000 Online High School
- New Day Academy
- Insight School of California
- Ocean Grove Charter School
- South Sutter Charter School
- Oak Knoll Virtual Academy
- Pacific View Charter School
- Delta Pacific Online School
- iHigh Virtual Academy
- Dunlap Leadership Academy
- iQ Academy California
- Riverside Virtual School
- California Online Public Schools
