= Ah, Wilderness! =

Play by Eugene O'Neill

- First edition 1933
- Original language: English
- Written by: Eugene O'Neill
- Genre: Comedy
- Setting: The Miller family home in small town Connecticut, July 4, 1906

Premiere
- Date: October 2, 1933
- Place: Guild Theatre; New York City

Ah, Wilderness! is a comedy play by American playwright Eugene O'Neill that premiered on Broadway at the Guild Theatre on October 2, 1933. It differs from a typical O'Neill play in its happy ending for the central character, and depiction of a happy family in turn-of-the-century America. It is O'Neill's only well-known comedy.

The play was successful in its first Broadway production and the touring production that followed. It has since become a staple of community repertory.

== Theme ==
The play takes place on the Fourth of July 1906 and focuses on the Miller family, presumably of New London, Connecticut. The main plot deals with the middle son of a local newspaper publisher, 16-year-old Richard, and his coming of age in turn-of-the-century America. "Perhaps the most atypical of the author's works, the play presents a sentimental tale of youthful indiscretion in a turn-of-the-century New England town."

== Title ==
The title derives from Quatrain XII of Edward Fitzgerald's translation of the Rubáiyát of Omar Khayyám (5th edition, 1889), one of Richard's favorite poems:

A Book of Verses underneath the Bough,
A Jug of Wine, a Loaf of Bread—and Thou
Beside me singing in the Wilderness—
Oh, Wilderness were Paradise enow!

== Opening night credits ==
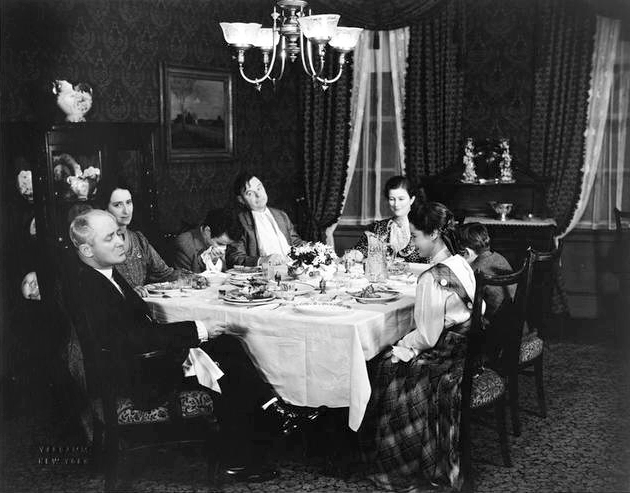
Around the table in the original 1933 Broadway production of Ah, Wilderness! are (from left) George M. Cohan (Nat Miller), Eda Heinemann (Lily), Elisha Cook, Jr. (Richard), Gene Lockhart (Sid), Marjorie Marquis (Mrs. Nat Miller), Walter Vonnegut, Jr. (Tommy) and Adelaide Bean (Mildred).

=== Crew ===
- Theatre Guild Producer
- Philip Moeller Director
- Robert Edmond Jones Scenic Designer

=== Cast ===
- George M. Cohan as Nat Miller
- Adelaide Bean as Mildred Miller
- John Butler as Salesman
- Ruth Chorpenning as Norah
- Elisha Cook, Jr. as the son, Richard Miller
- Ruth Gilbert as Muriel McComber
- Eda Heinemann as Lily Miller
- Ruth Holden as Belle
- Gene Lockhart as Sid Davis
- Marjorie Marquis as Richard's mother, Essie Miller
- Donald McClelland as Bartender
- William Post Jr. as Arthur Miller
- Richard Sterling as David McComber
- Walter Vonnegut, Jr. as Tommy Miller
- John Wynne as Wint Selby

When the play first toured, Will Rogers took the role of the warmhearted Nat, perhaps contributing to the critical and audience success of the play, a staple of community repertory since the original production.

== Reception ==
The play was included in Burns Mantle's The Best Plays of 1933–1934 with George M. Cohan in the cast and again as a revival in 1941–42.

In a review of a 1998 production of the play at The Huntington Theatre in Boston, the reviewer noted O'Neill, who "penned [it] in a single month in 1932, the Harvard educated playwright takes a well deserved vacation from this cold and unrelenting world, and gives us a surprisingly warm portrayal of middle-class family life in "large small-town America."" He further remarked about the play "The character Richard Miller was clearly modeled on O'Neill's image of himself as an aspiring poet, but unlike O'Neill, Richard's rebellion is quelled and his craving for romantic endeavors extinguished by a loving family who cares and wishes him the best."

== Adaptations ==
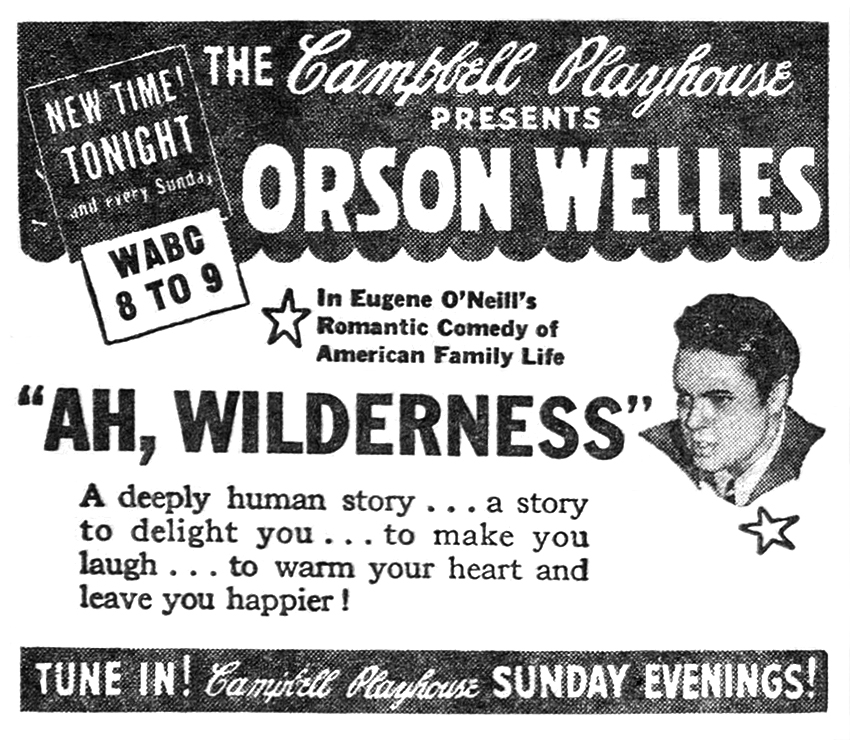
Newspaper advertisement for The Campbell Playhouse presentation of "Ah, Wilderness" (September 17, 1939)

The play was made into a 1935 film of the same title and again in 1948 as the musical Summer Holiday. Mickey Rooney starred as Tommy in the former and Richard in the latter. The success of the first film led MGM to reunite much of the cast in another film based on a small town coming of age play, A Family Affair, which became the basis for the Andy Hardy series.

The play was also adapted for radio on The Campbell Playhouse in a one-hour version produced by and starring Orson Welles on September 17, 1939. Additional one-hour radio adaptations were performed on the Theatre Guild on The Air on October 7, 1945, Studio One on July 15, 1947, and the Ford Theater on November 2, 1947.

On June 15, 1955, a televised adaptation was shown on Front Row Center on CBS.

The story was also made into the 1959 Broadway musical Take Me Along starring Jackie Gleason as the drunken Uncle Sid (Beery's role in the film), Walter Pidgeon as Nat and Robert Morse as Richard. The production ran for 448 performances. Gleason won the 1960 Tony Award for Best Actor in a Musical. A revival in 1984 had a successful run for six months in Connecticut and Washington, D.C., but closed on Broadway after only a short debut and a week of previews.

== Awards and nominations ==
=== 1975 Broadway revival ===
Year	Award	Category	Nominee	Result
1976	Tony Award	Best Direction of a Play	Arvin Brown	Nominated

=== 1988 Broadway revival ===
Year	Award	Category	Nominee	Result
1989	Tony Award	Best Revival		Nominated

=== 1998 Broadway revival ===
Year	Award	Category	Nominee	Result
1998	Tony Award	Best Revival of a Play		Nominated
1998	Tony Award	Best Featured Actor in a Play	Sam Trammell	Nominated
1998	Theatre World Award		Sam Trammell	Won
