= Tom Kneebone =

New Zealand-Canadian actor (1932–2003)

Tom Kneebone CM OOnt
- Born: 12 May 1932; Auckland, New Zealand
- Died: 15 November 2003 (aged 71); Toronto, Ontario, Canada
- Occupations: Cabaret performer and actor

Tom Kneebone, CM OOnt (12 May 1932 – 15 November 2003) was a New Zealand-Canadian cabaret performer and actor.

== Early life ==
Born in Auckland, New Zealand, Kneebone went to England to study at the Bristol Old Vic Theatre School.

== Career ==
He moved to Canada in 1963 and performed in various revues in Toronto, Ontario and across Canada for decades, often with onstage partner Dinah Christie. He performed at the Shaw Festival and the Stratford Festival of Canada. He became artistic director of the Smile Theatre Company in 1987, writing and directing performances at health care facilities and senior citizens' homes.

In early-2003, he was named a member of both the Order of Canada and the Order of Ontario. Kneebone's Order of Canada honour was in recognition of being a "multi-talented performer who has had a long and eclectic career" while his Order of Ontario honour was for having "brought joy to the lives of thousands of seniors confined to nursing homes and long-term care facilities through live theatre".

== Personal life ==
Kneebone died on 15 November 2003, aged 71 in Toronto.

== Filmography ==
=== Film ===
Year	Title	Role	Notes
1964	The Luck of Ginger Coffey	Kenny	
1986	A Judgment in Stone	Norman Smith	

=== Television ===
Year	Title	Role	Notes
1954	Give Them a Ring	Charlie	Television film
1958	On Camera	Steve / Brenden McCoy	2 episodes
1958	The Adventures of Chich	Host	24 episodes
1958–1959	Folio	Njegus / Variety / Diggory	4 episodes
1958–1960	General Motors Theatre	Tom Burton / Drinker / Newsvendor	4 episodes
1960	R.C.M.P.	Newman	Episode: "The Extortionist"
1963	Playdate	Stage Manager	Episode: "The Critic"
1963, 1964	Festival	Stephen Undershaft / Dubois	2 episodes
1963–1966	Mister Rogers' Neighborhood	Thomas Farmer	15 episodes
1964	The Forest Rangers	Bobo the Clown	Episode: "Let There Be Rain"
1979	King of Kensington	Charlie	Episode: "Dear Aunt Martha"
1987	Adderly	Heywood	Episode: "Tiers of Internment"
1990	Road to Avonlea	Rev. Brinsmead	Episode: "Conversions"
1990	Back to the Beanstalk	The Butler	Television film
1990–1993	Counterstrike	Bennett	66 episodes
1991–1992	The Adventures of Tintin	Additional voices	26 episodes
1993	Beyond Reality	Carmichael Williams	Episode: "The Loving Cup"
1994	Kung Fu: The Legend Continues	Murray McCormack	Episode: "Magic Trick"
1994–1995	Side Effects	Mr. Hamburg	4 episodes
1995	Spenser: A Savage Place	Henri	Television film
