= The Barris Beat =

Canadian variety television series

- Genre: Variety
- Written by: Alex Barris; Bernie Orenstein; Sammy Sales
- Directed by: Norman Jewison
- Presented by: Alex Barris
- Narrated by: Bruce Marsh
- Country of origin: Canada
- Original language: English
- No. of seasons: 2

Production
- Producers: Len Casey (1956); Norman Jewison (1956–1957)
- Running time: 30 minutes

Original release
- Network: CBC Television
- Release: 4 July 1956 – 30 June 1957

The Barris Beat is a Canadian variety television series that aired on CBC Television from 1956 to 1957.

== Premise ==
Alex Barris, an entertainment writer for Toronto newspaper The Globe and Mail, hosted this entertainment series. Initially, the series was a mid-year replacement for Cross Canada Hit Parade, then was granted a full season run in October 1956. The Barris Beat functioned as a low-budget version of The Steve Allen Show.

The series featured Bill Isbister's house band, accompanied by the Gino Silvi Octet and vocalists Betty Jean Ferguson and Roy Roberts. Jack Duffy later joined the series as another vocalist and in a recurring role as a newspaper copy assistant with Barris who portrayed a columnist.

For the full season, Ferguson left the series and was replaced by Gloria Lambert. Besides Duffy and Roberts, Larry D. Mann joined as a series regular as did Sammy Sales who was previously a guest in the early episodes. Cynthia Barrett led a regularly seen vocal trio while musical direction was provided by Gordon Kushner and music was arranged by Phil Nimmons. A recurring "billboard girl" character (Sheila Billing, then Babs Christie) was also introduced. Additional writing was provided by Allan Manings and Frank Peppiatt.

Visiting performers during the series included Dave Broadfoot and the Willy Blok Hansen dance trio.

== Production ==
Len Casey initially produced The Barris Beat for the first several weeks. He left the series and was replaced by Norman Jewison for the remainder of the series run. Barris later indicated conflicts with Casey regarding the series concept.

== Scheduling ==
This half-hour series was broadcast Wednesdays at 9:00 p.m. (North American Eastern time) from 4 July to 12 September 1956 as a mid-year replacement.

The series began a full season on alternate Saturdays at approximately 10:30 p.m. from 20 October to 30 June 1957, following the hockey broadcast during the National Hockey League season. Wayne and Shuster was broadcast on the other Saturdays.
