= Meg Tilly =

American actress and writer (born 1960)

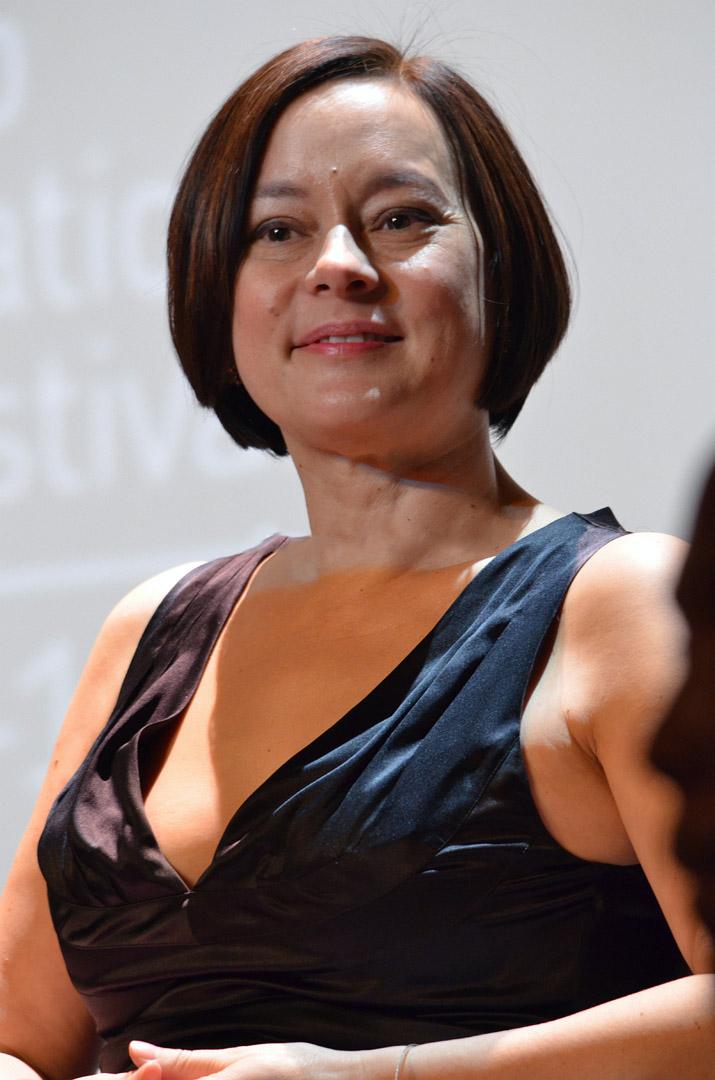
- Tilly in 2013
- Born: Margaret Elizabeth Chan; February 14, 1960 (age 66); Long Beach, California, U.S.
- Occupations: Actress; writer
- Years active: 1980–1995, 2010–present (acting); 1994–present (writing)
- Spouses: Tim Zinnemann (m. 1983; div. 1989) John Calley (m. 1995; div. 2002) Don Calame (m. 2002)
- Partner: Colin Firth (1989–1994)
- Children: 3
- Relatives: Jennifer Tilly (sister)

Meg Tilly (born Margaret Elizabeth Chan on February 14, 1960) is an American actress and writer.

For her role in the 1985 film Agnes of God, she won a Golden Globe Award and was nominated for the Academy Award for Best Supporting Actress. Her other film roles include Psycho II (1983), The Big Chill (1983), Masquerade (1988), and Valmont (1989). For her role in the television series Bomb Girls (2012–13), she won the 2013 Canadian Screen Award for Best Lead Actress in a Drama Series.

Tilly has also written multiple novels, including Porcupine (2007), which was a finalist for the Sheila A. Egoff Children's Literature Prize.

== Early life ==
Tilly was born on February 14, 1960, in Long Beach, California, to Patricia Ann (née Tilly), a Canadian teacher, and businessman Harry Chan. Her father was Chinese-American, while her mother was of Irish and Finnish descent. She is the younger sister of actress Jennifer Tilly.

Following her parents' divorce when she was three, Tilly was raised by her mother and stepfather, John Ward, on rural Texada Island in British Columbia, Canada. She later said that Ward was a violent pedophile. At the age of 12, Tilly started taking dance lessons, in part to avoid her stepfather, and in a few years had developed into a gifted ballerina.

Tilly attended Esquimalt High School in Esquimalt, British Columbia, and also Chief Sealth International High School in Seattle, Washington, where she is listed among its alumni. After graduating from high school, Tilly left home and moved to the United States to pursue a career as a professional dancer. In New York City she studied with Madame Darvash and Melissa Hayden on full scholarship. She joined the Connecticut Ballet Company. She made her screen debut as a dancer in Alan Parker's 1980 musical drama Fame, despite the fact that Tilly's dance career had been halted in 1979, when a dance partner dropped her, leading to a serious back injury.

== Career ==
=== Acting ===
Forced to give up dancing because of complications stemming from her back injury, Tilly moved to Los Angeles to pursue a career as an actress and studied acting under Peggy Feury. She made her television debut in the 1982 half-hour drama The Trouble with Grandpa, co-starring with Elisha Cook Jr. After playing a prostitute in a second-season episode of Hill Street Blues, she appeared in her first starring role in the 1982 coming-of-age adventure film Tex with Matt Dillon.

In 1983, after she starred as the lead in the supernatural horror film One Dark Night, she appeared in Psycho II with Anthony Perkins, and Lawrence Kasdan's award-winning ensemble film The Big Chill, with Kevin Kline, Glenn Close, Tom Berenger, William Hurt, Jeff Goldblum, JoBeth Williams and Mary Kay Place. Tilly's appearance in The Big Chill, which was nominated for three Academy Awards, including Best Picture, helped her career significantly. In 1984, she starred in the movie Impulse.

Tilly was the first choice for the role of Constanze Mozart in Miloš Forman's film Amadeus, having received glowing appraisals of her rehearsal work by both her would-be costar Tom Hulce and director Forman. However, she sustained a leg injury playing soccer and had to abandon the project. The role later went to Elizabeth Berridge.

In 1985, Tilly landed the acclaimed title role in Norman Jewison's Agnes of God, appearing with Jane Fonda and Anne Bancroft. Playing the role of a novitiate nun who confesses her involvement in a virgin conception, Tilly "delivered a magnificent portrayal of a tormented young woman experiencing the ultimate crisis of faith". Tilly's critically praised performance earned her an Academy Award nomination and a Golden Globe Award.

Tilly later appeared in Valmont (1989), The Two Jakes (1990) with Jack Nicholson and Leaving Normal (1992) with Christine Lahti, as well as the 1993 horror film Body Snatchers. After this, she stopped acting for the next 15 years.

Tilly returned to acting in 2010, portraying the Blessed Mother, a Pope-like figure in the Caprica episode "Unvanquished". In 2011 she played Martha in Edward Albee's Who's Afraid of Virginia Woolf?, presented by the Blue Bridge Repertory Theatre in Victoria, B.C.

In January 2012, Global in Canada launched the six-part Bomb Girls about women who work in a munitions factory during World War II. Tilly stars as Lorna, the emotionally closed floor matron who blossoms as a leader and an appealing woman. She won the 2013 Lead Actress, Drama Canadian Screen Award for her work on the series.

=== Writing ===
Tilly is the author of multiple published novels. In 1994, Tilly's first novel Singing Songs was published by Dutton to generally positive reviews. Donna Rifkind from Publishers Weekly called the book "an impressive first novel", and the New York Times Book Review praised Tilly for "the remarkable coherence and clarity" of Anna's narrative voice. The book is about a young girl and her sisters living in the Northwest who are molested by their stepfather.

Her second novel Gemma was published in 2006 by the Syren Book Company. and picked up by St. Martin's Press in 2010. The book is about a twelve-year-old girl who is kidnapped and taken on a cross-country journey in which she is physically and sexually abused by her captor.

Her third novel Porcupine was published in 2007 by Tundra Books. The book is about a twelve-year-old girl, Jacqueline "Jack" Cooper, whose life is shattered by the death of her father by friendly fire in the War in Afghanistan. Porcupine was a finalist for the Sheila A. Egoff Children's Literature Prize, shortlisted for The Canadian Libraries Association Best Children's Book 2008, Foreword Magazine Book of the Year and was an Ontario Library Best Bets 2008.

Her fourth novel First Time was published in 2008 by Orca Book Publishers. The novel is about a sixteen-year-old who is molested and physically abused by her mother's boyfriend, and must deal with the trauma alone without the help of her mother or best friend. First Time was a 2009 Golden Eagle Award Nominee, a 2009 YALSA Quick Picks and 2010 CCBC Best Books.

Tilly's fifth novel A Taste of Heaven was published in 2013 by Puffin Books. A departure from the darker themes of Tilly's previous work, the novel is about two young girls who become friends who experience the "comical, sometimes bittersweet and melodramatic trials and tribulations of tweenhood". One reviewer wrote, "Tilly paints an insightful, memorable portrait of the ups and downs of friendship and the unwavering bonds of family, delving into age-old issues of honesty, trust, and loyalty. A Taste Of Heaven was shortlisted for the 2014 Libris Young Reader Book of the Year, a 2014 Diamond Willow Award and won the 2014/2015 Chocolate Lilly Award.

Her sixth novel, Behind the Scenes, was published in 2014 by Puffin Books (Canada).

In 2018, Tilly published the first of three books in her Solace Island trilogy, a series of romantic thrillers about a young woman, Maggie Harris, dating a mysterious handsome man after recently being dumped by her fiancé. It was quickly followed by two sequels, Cliff's Edge and Hidden Cove.

In 2021, Tilly's latest novel, the new romantic thriller The Runaway Heiress, was published.

== Personal life ==
In 1983, Tilly married Tim Zinnemann, an American film producer and son of film director Fred Zinnemann. They met on the set of her first film, Tex. The couple had two children, Emily (born 1984) and David (born 1986). The marriage ended in divorce in 1989.

In 1989, Tilly began a five-year relationship with English actor Colin Firth, whom she met during the filming of Valmont. They moved from Los Angeles to a log house on five acres of mountainside property about an hour outside Vancouver near the town of Maple Ridge, British Columbia. They have one son, William Joseph (born 1990).

In 1995, Tilly married John Calley, an American film studio executive and producer 30 years her senior. They moved to Los Angeles, where Calley worked as president and CEO of Sony Pictures Entertainment. The marriage ended in divorce in 2002.

In 2002, Tilly married author Don Calame, who writes fiction for adolescents. They met during a writing seminar in Big Sur, California.

Since 1999, Tilly has resided in the Gulf Islands, British Columbia.

== Filmography ==
=== Film ===
Meg Tilly film credits
| Year | Title | Role | Notes |
|---|---|---|---|
| 1980 | Fame | Principal Dancer | |
| 1982 | Tex | Jamie Collins | |
| 1982 | One Dark Night | Julie Wells | |
| 1983 | Psycho II | Mary Loomis | |
| 1983 | The Big Chill | Chloe | |
| 1984 | Impulse | Jennifer | |
| 1985 | Agnes of God | Sister Agnes Devereaux | |
| 1986 | Off Beat | Rachel Wareham | |
| 1988 | Masquerade | Olivia Lawrence | |
| 1988 | The Girl in a Swing | Karin Foster | |
| 1989 | Valmont | Madame de Tourvel | |
| 1990 | The Two Jakes | Katherine "Kitty" Berman | |
| 1992 | Leaving Normal | Marianne Johnson | |
| 1993 | Body Snatchers | Carol Malone | |
| 1994 | Sleep with Me | Sarah | |
| 2016 | Antibirth | Lorna | |
| 2017 | War Machine | Jeanie McMahon | |
| 2024 | Ordinary Angels | —N/a | Screenplay only |

=== Television ===
Meg Tilly television credits
| Year | Title | Role | Notes |
|---|---|---|---|
| 1982 | Insight | Cindy / Dori | Episodes: "To Climb a Mountain" / "The Trouble with Grandpa" |
| 1982 | Hill Street Blues | Prostitute | Episode: "Some Like It Hot-Wired" |
| 1989 | Nightmare Classics | Carmilla | Episode: "Carmilla" |
| 1990 | In the Best Interest of the Child | Jennifer Colton | Television film |
| 1993 | Road to Avonlea | Evelyn Grier | Episode: "Evelyn" |
| 1993 | Fallen Angels | Lois Weldon | Episode: "Dead-End for Delia" |
| 1994 | Winnetka Road | George Grace | Main cast (6 episodes) |
| 1994 | Trick of the Eye | Faith Crowell | Television film |
| 1995 | Journey | Min | Television film |
| 2010 | Caprica | Blessed Mother | Episodes: "Unvanquished" / "The Heavens Will Rise" |
| 2012–13 | Bomb Girls | Lorna Corbett | Main role (19 episodes) |
| 2014 | Bomb Girls: Facing the Enemy | Lorna Corbett | Television film |
| 2022 | Chucky | Meg Tilly | Episodes: "Death on Denial" / "Doll on Doll" |

== Awards and nominations ==
Meg Tilly awards and nominations
| Year | Award | Nominated work | Result |
|---|---|---|---|
| 1984 | Saturn Award for Best Supporting Actress | Psycho II | Nominated |
| 1986 | Golden Globe Award for Best Supporting Actress – Motion Picture | Agnes of God | Won |
| 1986 | Academy Award for Best Supporting Actress | Agnes of God | Nominated |
| 1995 | Fangoria Chainsaw Award for Best Supporting Actress | Body Snatchers | Nominated |
| 2012 | Golden Nymph Award for Outstanding Actress in a Mini-Series | Bomb Girls | Nominated |
| 2012 | Leo Award for Best Lead Performance by a Female in a Dramatic Series | Bomb Girls | Won |
| 2013 | Leo Award for Best Lead Performance by a Female in a Dramatic Series | Bomb Girls | Won |
| 2013 | Canadian Screen Award for Best Actress in a Continuing Leading Dramatic Role | Bomb Girls | Won |
| 2013 | Golden Nymph Award for Outstanding Actress in a Drama Series | Bomb Girls | Nominated |
| 2013 | ACTRA Award for Outstanding Performance – Female | Bomb Girls | Nominated |
| 2014 | Canadian Screen Award for Best Actress in a Continuing Leading Dramatic Role | Bomb Girls | Nominated |
| 2014 | ACTRA Award for Outstanding Performance – Female | Bomb Girls: Facing the Enemy | Nominated |
| 2017 | Fangoria Chainsaw Award for Best Supporting Actress | Antibirth | Nominated |

== Published works ==
Met Tilly Published works
| Year | Title | ISBN | OCLC | Notes |
|---|---|---|---|---|
| 1994 | Singing Songs | 978-0-525-93778-4 | 29357009 | |
| 2006 | Gemma | 978-1-4299-5770-0 | 862069558 | |
| 2007 | Porcupine | 978-0-88776-810-1 | 77046068 | |
| 2008 | First Time | 978-1-55143-946-4 | 298262290 | |
| 2013 | A Taste of Heaven | 978-0-14-318249-8 | 937048604 | |
| 2014 | Behind the Scenes | 978-0-14-318251-1 | 874205901 | |
| 2018 | Solace Island | 978-0-440-00053-2 | 1122589821 | Solace Island series |
| 2019 | Cliff's Edge | 978-0-440-00054-9 | 1077745519 | Solace Island series |
| 2019 | Hidden Cove | 978-0-440-00056-3 | 1090279107 | Solace Island series |
| 2021 | The Runaway Heiress | 978-0-593-20108-4 | 1255182746 | |
