= Lies of the Twins =

- VHS cover
- Genre: Thriller
- Based on: Lives of the Twins by Rosamond Smith
- Teleplay by: Mel Frohman; Walter Klenhard
- Directed by: Tim Hunter
- Starring: Aidan Quinn; Isabella Rossellini; Iman; Claudia Christian; Richard Harrison
- Music by: David McHugh
- Country of origin: United States
- Original language: English

Production
- Executive producers: Gary Adelson; Craig Baumgarten
- Producer: Tim Zinnemann
- Cinematography: Declan Quinn
- Editor: Howard Smith
- Running time: 93 minutes
- Production companies: Adelson-Baumgarten Productions; MCA Television Entertainment

Original release
- Network: USA Network
- Release: August 21, 1991

Lies of the Twins is a 1991 American thriller television film directed by Tim Hunter.

== Plot ==
A fashion model embarks on a romantic affair with her psychiatrist. The relationship is thrown into question when the protagonist espies her lover with another woman. The man she sees winds up being his evil twin, further complicating matters.

== Cast ==
- Aidan Quinn as James McEwan / Jonathan McEwan
- Isabella Rossellini as Rachel Marks
- Iman as Cat (sometimes credited as Elie)
- Claudia Christian as Felice
- Richard Harrison as Jack Roth

== Production ==
Lies of the Twins, which first aired on the USA Network, is based on the novel Lives of the Twins by Joyce Carol Oates, writing under the pen-name Rosamond Smith. In an interview, Oates indicated that the filmmakers "changed the plot quite a bit. I didn't watch it."

Much of the film was shot at Richard Harrison's beachfront home in Malibu. It was one of the first productions that supermodel Iman worked on during her maiden year in Hollywood.

Lies of the Twins was produced by Tim Zinnemann for MCA Television Entertainment (MTE). Mel Frohman and Walter Klenhard prepared the teleplay, with Howard Smith serving as editor. David McHugh provided the film score and Peter Paul Raubertas supplied the production design. Declan Quinn, brother of male lead Aidan Quinn, was in charge of cinematography. It is known as Bugie allo specchio in Italy.

== Home Video ==
Lies of the Twins was released on VHS in 1992 by MCA Universal.

== Reception ==
The film was generally well-received by critics upon release.

== Bibliography ==
- Harris M. Lentz, Science Fiction, Horror & Fantasy Film and Television Credits: Supplement 2, Through 1993, Volume 4, (McFarland: 1994)
