= Tim Zinnemann =

American film producer

- Born: April 15, 1940 (age 86); Los Angeles, California, U.S.
- Occupations: Film producer, assistant director, photographer
- Years active: 1960–present
- Spouses: Sharon M. McLaglen (m. 1967; div. 1972); Meg Tilly (m. 1983; div. 1989); Christine M. Walton (m. 1995; div. 2001)
- Children: 5

Tim Zinnemann (born April 15, 1940) is an American film producer, former assistant director, and photographer. He is best known for his work on the films The Cowboys, The Long Riders, The Running Man and The Island of Dr. Moreau.

== Early life and education ==
Zinnemann was born in Los Angeles, California, the son of director Fred Zinnemann and Renee Bartlett. He attended Columbia University, but left before graduation to work as a film editor in Italy.

== Career ==
He began his career as an assistant director on the film Harlow (1965). Other films followed such as Cast a Giant Shadow, What Did You Do in the War, Daddy? (both released in 1966), The Happening (1967), Bullitt (1968), and the Western television series Cimarron Strip. His other assistant directorial credits include The Great White Hope (1970), The Reivers (1969), Cinderella Liberty (1973), The Day of the Locust (1975), Farewell, My Lovely (1975) and Smile (1975).

He then became a line producer. His credits include Straight Time (1978), A Small Circle of Friends (1980), The Long Riders (1980), Impulse (1984), Fandango (1985), The Running Man (1987), Lies of the Twins (1991), Street Fighter and The Island of Dr. Moreau (1996), his last producing credit. In 1985, he directed an episode of Miami Vice, his only directing credit to date.

Since 1992, Zinnemann focused on photography, working for various publications.

== Personal life ==
Zinnemann married his first wife, Anna Bellini, in Italy. He married his second wife, Sharon M. McLaglen, in 1967. The couple had one child before divorcing in 1972. In 1983, Zinnemann married actress Meg Tilly, who was 20 years his junior. Together they had two children, Emily (b. 1984) and David (b. 1986), before their divorce in 1989. Zinnemann's fourth marriage was to actress Christine M. Walton in 1995. They also had two children, before divorcing in 2001.

== Filmography ==
He was a producer in all films unless otherwise noted.

=== Film ===
Year	Film	Credit
1972	The Cowboys	Associate producer
1975	Smile	Associate producer
1976	Won Ton Ton, the Dog Who Saved Hollywood	Associate producer
1978	Straight Time	
1980	A Small Circle of Friends	
1980	The Long Riders	
1982	Tex	
1984	Impulse	
1985	Fandango	
1986	Crossroads	Executive producer
1987	The Running Man	
1989	Pet Sematary	Executive producer
1994	Street Fighter	Executive producer
1996	The Island of Dr. Moreau	Executive producer

Second unit director or assistant director

Year	Film	Role	Notes
1964	Kiss Me, Stupid	Assistant director	Uncredited
1965	The Hallelujah Trail	Assistant director	Uncredited
1965	Harlow	Assistant director	
1966	Cast a Giant Shadow	Assistant director	
1966	What Did You Do in the War, Daddy?	Assistant director	
1967	The Happening	Assistant director	
1968	Bullitt	Assistant director	
1969	The Reivers	Assistant director	
1970	The Great White Hope	Assistant director	
1971	Carnal Knowledge	Assistant director	
1972	The Cowboys	Assistant director	
1972	The King of Marvin Gardens	Assistant director	
1973	Cinderella Liberty	First assistant director	
1975	Smile	Assistant director	
1975	The Day of the Locust	Assistant director	
1975	Farewell, My Lovely	First assistant director	

Production manager

Year	Film	Role
1973	Cinderella Liberty	Production manager
1973	The Day of the Dolphin	Production manager
1975	Farewell, My Lovely	Unit production manager
1976	Won Ton Ton, the Dog Who Saved Hollywood	Unit production manager

Editorial department

Year	Film	Role
1963	The Pink Panther	Assistant film editor

Thanks

Year	Film	Role
1998	The Thin Red Line	Thanks

=== Television ===
Year	Title	Notes
1979	The Jericho Mile	Television film
1991	Lies of the Twins	Television film

Second unit director or assistant director

Year	Title	Role
1967−68	Cimarron Strip	Assistant director

As director

Year	Title
1985	Miami Vice
