= Impulse (1984 film) =

- Theatrical release poster
- Directed by: Graham Baker
- Written by: Don Carlos Dunaway; Nicholas Kazan
- Produced by: Tim Zinnemann
- Starring: Tim Matheson; Meg Tilly; Hume Cronyn
- Cinematography: Thomas Del Ruth
- Edited by: David Holden
- Music by: Paul Chihara
- Production company: ABC Motion Pictures
- Distributed by: 20th Century Fox
- Release date: September 28, 1984
- Running time: 91 minutes
- Country: United States
- Language: English
- Budget: $10 million
- Box office: $2,773,433

Impulse is a 1984 American science fiction thriller film directed by Graham Baker and starring Tim Matheson, Meg Tilly and Hume Cronyn. The film's plot is about the residents of a small rural town who start to exhibit strange and violent behavior after a small earthquake ruptures the seal on a toxic waste burial site.

== Plot ==
Stuart and his girlfriend Jennifer Russell come to the town to visit her hospitalized mother Margaret. The couple begin to notice increasingly odd behavior by several of the townspeople. Although Stuart drinks the local milk, Jennifer does not. As the day progresses, the townspeople and Stuart begin to exhibit signs of violent and extreme sexual behavior. Jennifer visits her friend Margo where she observes evidence that she broke her son Jimmy's arm. When Jennifer tries to leave in her car, she finds the kids Jimmy and Shawn have slashed her tires. When she tries to leave in Margo's car, Jimmy and Shawn trap her in the garage and set it on fire. Jennifer barely escapes with her life. The local physician Dr. Carr euthanizes Margaret and then takes his own life. Stuart discovers that Jennifer's brother Eddie harbors incestuous feelings for her and kills him. As the town descends into chaos and Stuart becomes violent, Jennifer flees in a pickup truck but gets stuck outside of town.

At the same time, Stuart escapes to the woods where he discovers the recently repaired toxic waste vault which he follows to the milk facility, discovering a pipe leak dripping liquid into a vat of milk. He then begins to walk back to town, but comes across Jennifer in the stuck pickup truck. He helps free the truck, then warns her that as the only uninfected person she needs to leave, but he intends to return to town to help as best he can. Then, two men are seen loading a biplane with barrels of liquid. After the plane takes off, Stuart walks up to the other man whose government vehicle is filled with radios, on which he hears talk about spraying the town. Stuart deduces this man has some connection with the events in the town, but when he confronts the man, he shoots Stuart dead with a shotgun. Jennifer, who had turned around to return to town, witnesses the man kill her boyfriend. She then runs down the man with her pickup truck and kills him. There are views of the town littered with corpses and a news item that government agencies have no explanation for the mass death of the entire town. Jennifer walks away as the sun sets.

== Cast ==
- Tim Matheson as Stuart
- Meg Tilly as Jennifer Russell
- Hume Cronyn as Dr. Carr
- John Karlen as Bob Russell
- Bill Paxton as Eddie Russell
- Amy Stryker as Margo
- Claude Earl Jones as Sheriff Jenkins
- Robert Wightman as Howard
- Lorinne Vozoff as Margaret Russell
- Peter Jason as Man in Truck
- Christian Crane as Shawn
- Chris Giannini as Jimmy
- Allan Graf as Deputy Ned
- Anne Haney as Gladys Piersall

== Reception ==
Audiences polled by CinemaScore gave the film an average grade of "D" on an A+ to F scale.
