= Baptism of Fire (1943 film) =

1943 film

- Starring: Elisha Cook Jr.
- Production company: Signal Corps
- Distributed by: Warner Bros.
- Release date: 1943
- Country: United States
- Language: English

Baptism of Fire is a 1943 American documentary film starring Elisha Cook Jr. It was nominated for an Academy Award for Best Documentary Feature.

== Cast ==
- Elisha Cook Jr. as Bill
- Peter Whitney as Pete
