= Walter Klenhard =

American film director, writer and actor (born 1953)

- Born: September 4, 1953 (age 72)
- Education: UCLA; Goddard College
- Occupations: Film director; writer; actor; educator

Walter Klenhard is an American film director, writer and actor. He has written, produced, or directed more than 30 full-length films as well as written and produced for episodic television.

== Education ==
Klenhard has a BA from UCLA in political science, and an MFA from Goddard College in creative writing.

== Film career ==
Klenhard began his career as an actor, appearing on stage and in film and television. He later transitioned into production, working in various capacities including sound, props, editorial and post-production.

In 1987, Klenhard spent six months in Thailand working on the 20th Century Fox feature Off Limits starring Willem Dafoe and Gregory Hines.

He also has credits as a film composer and played guitar for the 1980s Los Angeles-based punk-rock group The Magnificent Bricks.

Klenhard along with Mel Frohman co-wrote the teleplay for the 1991 Tim Hunter-directed film Lies of the Twins starring Isabella Rossellini, Aidan Quinn and Iman. He also co-wrote the teleplay for the 1991 Bill Condon-directed film Dead in the Water starring Bryan Brown and Teri Hatcher.

In 1998, Klenhard shared story and screenplay credits in the CBS television film Logan's War: Bound by Honor, starring Chuck Norris and Eddie Cibrian

Klenhard's recent work includes the Garage Sale Mystery series of movies (Hallmark, 2013-6), Bringing Ashley Home (Lifetime, 2011) and Murder Among Friends (Lifetime, 2010), which he wrote and directed. He also received an Edgar Award nomination for the USA Network film The Last Hit. "Bringing Ashley Home" won a PRISM Award in 2013.

Klenhard is a current member of the Directors Guild of America, the Writers Guild of America and Screen Actors Guild.

== Academic career ==
As an educator, he was a full-time faculty member at Emerson College in Boston from 2012 to 2014, teaching screenwriting and film directing. He was the Board President of the California Virtual Academy from 2006 to 2012. He is also a founding board member of the CAVA High School in Los Angeles.
