= Elisha Cook Jr. =

American actor (1903–1995)

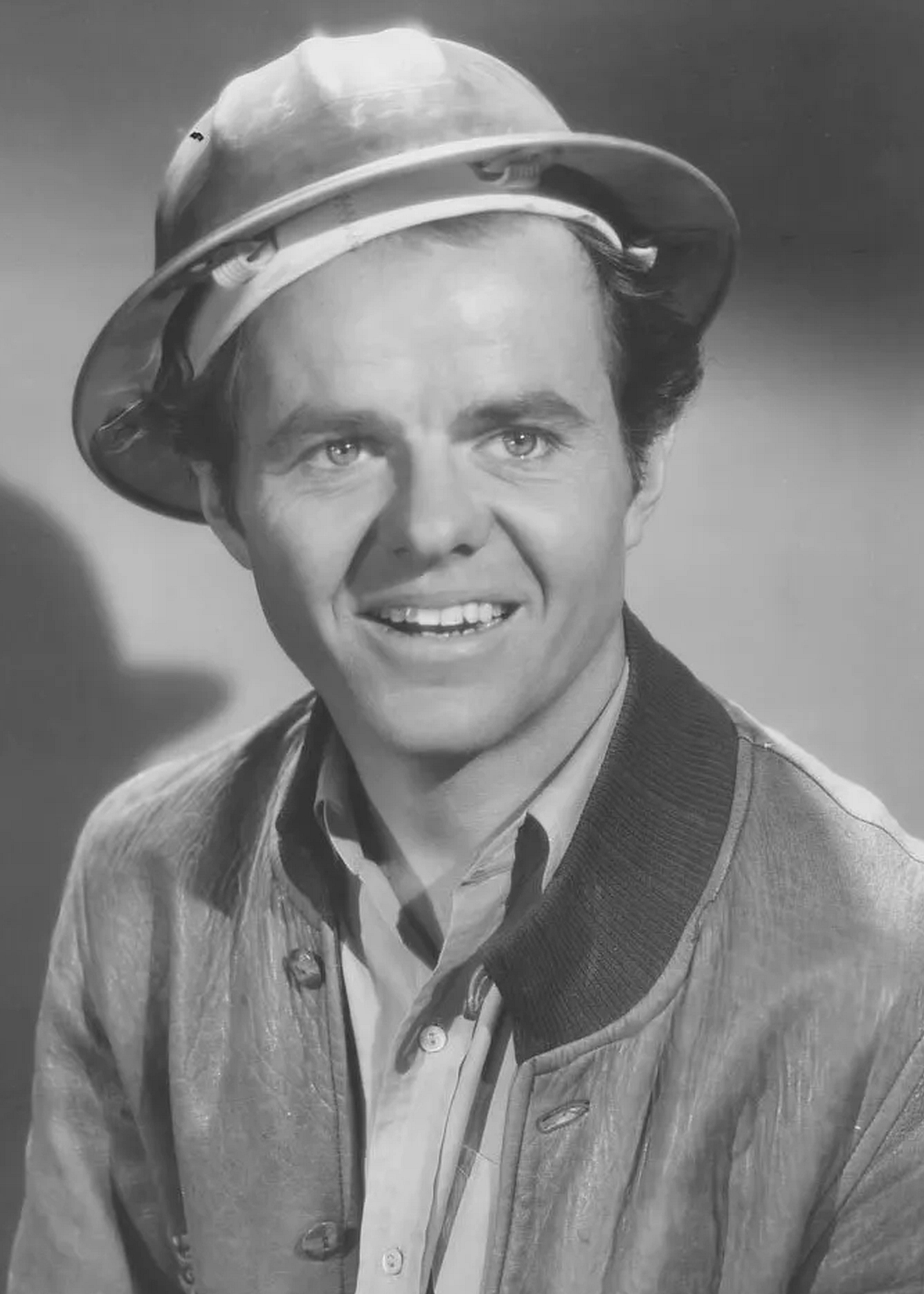
- Cook in Wildcat (1942)
- Born: Elisha Vanslyck Cook Jr. December 26, 1903; San Francisco, California, U.S.
- Died: May 18, 1995 (aged 91); Big Pine, California, U.S.
- Occupation: Actor
- Years active: 1926–1988
- Spouses: Mary Gertrude Dunckley (m. 1928; div. 1941) Peggy McKenna (m. 1943; div. 1968) (m. 1971)

Elisha Vanslyck Cook Jr. (December 26, 1903 – May 18, 1995) was an American character actor famed for his work in film noir. He played cheerful, brainy collegiates until he was cast against type as the bug-eyed baby-faced killer Wilmer Cook in the 1941 version of The Maltese Falcon. He went on to play deceptively mild-mannered villains. Cook's acting career spanned more than 60 years, with roles in productions including The Big Sleep, Shane, The Killing, House on Haunted Hill and Rosemary's Baby.

== Early life, stage, and military service ==
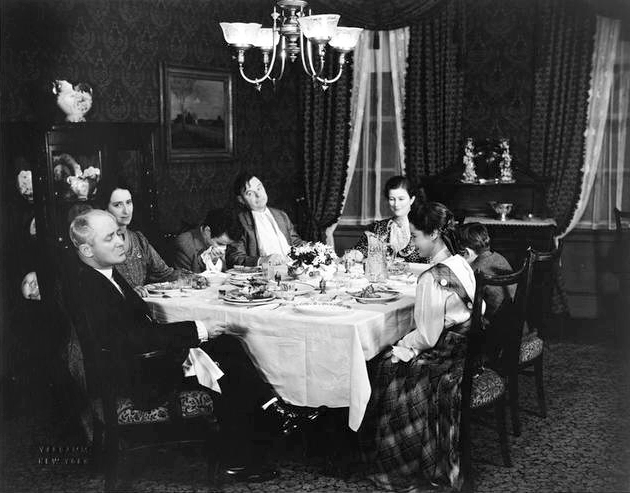
Around the table in the Theatre Guild's original 1933 Broadway production of Ah, Wilderness! are (from left) George M. Cohan, Eda Heinemann, Elisha Cook, Jr., Noah Beery Jr., Marjorie Marquis, Walter Vonnegut, Jr. and Adelaide Bean.

Born in San Francisco and raised in Chicago, Cook was the son of Elisha Vanslyck Cook Sr., a journalist and sometime playwright, and actress Helen Roslyn Henry. He first worked in theater lobbies selling programs, but by the age of 14 he was already performing in vaudeville and stock. In 1933, Eugene O'Neill cast him in the role of Richard Miller in his play Ah, Wilderness, which ran on Broadway for two years.

Cook enlisted in the United States Army in Los Angeles, on August 15, 1942. According to his enlistment record he stood 5-feet-5-inches tall and weighed 123 pounds. Cook's military record documents his level of education at "3 years of high school," received at St. Albans School for Boys in Sycamore, Illinois.

== Career in film ==
In 1930, Cook traveled to California, where he made his film debut in Hollywood’s version of the play Her Unborn Child, a motion picture directed by Albert Ray and produced by Windsor Picture Plays Inc.

At Twentieth Century-Fox, Cook made an impression as a bespectacled college freshman with radical ideas in the musical comedy Pigskin Parade (1936). He was also featured in the unofficial sequel, Life Begins in College (1937). Cook remained at Fox for two years, and then began freelancing at other studios. He did return to Fox occasionally in prominent roles: as a songwriter in the Alice Faye-Betty Grable musical Tin Pan Alley (1940), and as a mobster disguised as an old woman in the Laurel and Hardy feature A-Haunting We Will Go (1942). Typical of his early, bookish roles was his turn as a meek screenwriter in the madcap Olsen and Johnson comedy Hellzapoppin (1941).

After The Maltese Falcon, Cook became typecast again, as weaklings or sadistic losers and hoodlums, who in the plots were usually murdered, either being strangled, poisoned or shot. In Universal's Phantom Lady (1944), he portrays a slimy, intoxicated nightclub-orchestra drummer to memorable effect. He received excellent notices for his portrayal of a happy, breezy disc jockey who turns out to be a homicidal maniac in The Falcon's Alibi (1946). He also had a substantial, though uncredited role as Bobo in the 1953 film noir production I, the Jury.

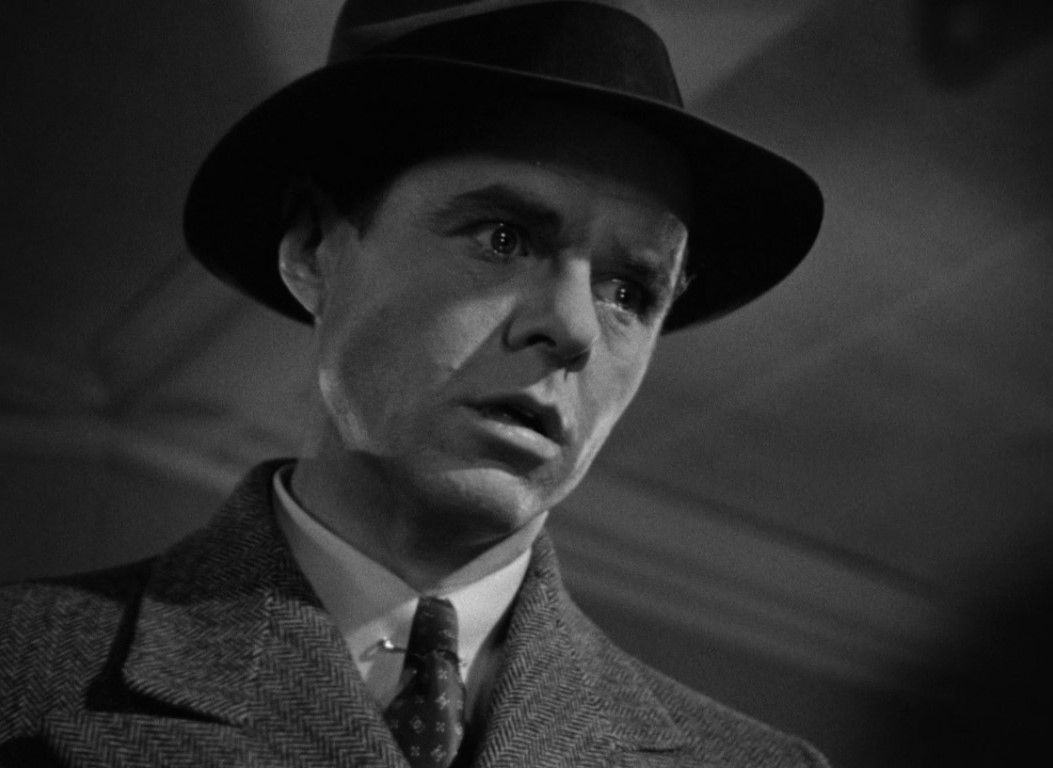
Cook in The Maltese Falcon (1941)

Cook and Lawrence Tierney in Born to Kill (1947)

In addition to his performance as Wilmer in The Maltese Falcon (1941), some of Cook's other notable roles include the doomed informant Harry Jones in The Big Sleep (1946), the henchman (Marty Waterman) of the murderous title character in Born to Kill (1947), the pugnacious ex-Confederate soldier 'Stonewall' Torrey who is gunned down by Jack Palance in Shane (1953), and George Peatty, the shady, cuckolded husband in Stanley Kubrick's The Killing (1956). Other films in which he appeared are William Castle's horror film House on Haunted Hill (1959), One-Eyed Jacks (1961), Papa's Delicate Condition (1963), Blood on the Arrow (1964), Rosemary's Baby (1968), The Great Bank Robbery (1969), El Condor (1970), Blacula (1972), The Great Northfield Minnesota Raid (1972), Pat Garrett and Billy the Kid (1973), The Outfit (1973), Tom Horn and Carny, both in 1980, and Treasure: In Search of the Golden Horse (1984).

== Television ==
Cook appeared on a wide variety of American television series from the early 1950s to the late 1980s. He played a private detective, Homer Garrity, in an episode of Adventures of Superman television series titled "Semi-Private Eye," airing for the first time on January 16, 1954. That same year, on April 12, he guest-starred on NBC's The Dennis Day Show. In 1960, he was cast in the episode "The Hermit" of the ABC sitcom The Real McCoys with Walter Brennan. He appeared too in 1960 as Jeremy Hake in the episode "The Bequest" of the ABC western series The Rebel, which starred Nick Adams. He also portrayed the character Gideon McCoy in the 1966 episode "The Night of the Bars of Hell" on The Wild Wild West. He performed as well in the second episode of ABC's crime drama The Fugitive.

Cook made two guest appearances on the CBS courtroom drama series Perry Mason. In 1958, he played Art Crowley in "The Case of the Pint-Sized Client", and in 1964 he played Reelin' Peter Rockwell in "The Case of the Reckless Rockhound". Cook memorably portrayed lawyer Samuel T. Cogley in the Star Trek 1967 episode "Court Martial". The same year, he played Isaac Isaacson on the Batman television series. He played Weasel Craig in Salem's Lot, and later had a long-term recurring role as Honolulu crime lord "Ice Pick" on CBS's Magnum, P.I. In October 1969 Cook appeared as Frankie in episode 33 of The Ghost & Mrs. Muir. In 1974 he made a surprise guest appearance on The Odd Couple as government agent Eliot Ness. That same year, he guest-starred as Herbie on Mannix in the 1974 episode "The Green Man." He appeared too in The Bionic Woman episode "Once a Thief" in 1977.

Toward the end of his life, Cook often played dimwitted or cranky elderly characters. He played a bum in an episode of The A-Team as well as an elderly uncle in an episode of Alf, which was one of his last roles prior to his retirement entirely from acting in 1988. He died in 1995.

== Personal life ==
Cook was married to singer Mary Gertrude Dunckley (known professionally as Mary Lou Cook of the popular vocal quartet The Merry Macs) from 1928 until their divorce on November 4, 1941. He then married Illinois native Elvira Ann (Peggy) McKenna in 1943. They were married for 25 years until they formally divorced in Inyo County, California in February 1968. They remarried on December 30, 1971. Their second marriage lasted another 19 years until Peggy's death on December 23, 1990. Various references about Cook state that he had no children from his marriages; yet his army enlistment record of 1942 documents his marital status as "Divorced, with dependents," which suggests he may have had a child or children with his first wife, or been responsible for the well-being of others.

Cook never became part of the Hollywood social scene, which he held in low regard. His slight build and calm demeanor belied his offscreen status as a rugged outdoorsman. He resided for many years in Bishop, California, but he typically spent his summers at Lake Sabrina in the Sierra Nevada. According to John Huston, who in 1941 directed him in The Maltese Falcon:

[Cook] lived alone up in the High Sierra, tied flies and caught golden trout between films. When he was wanted in Hollywood, they sent word up to his mountain cabin by courier. He would come down, do a picture, and then withdraw again to his retreat.

== Death ==
Cook died of a stroke at age 91, on May 18, 1995, at a nursing home in Big Pine, California. He was the last surviving member of the main cast of The Maltese Falcon.

== Complete filmography ==
- Her Unborn Child (1930) as Stewart Kennedy (film debut)
- Chills and Fever (1930 short) as Member of the Glee Club (uncredited)
- Honor Among Lovers (1931) as Office Boy (uncredited)
- Two in a Crowd (1936) as Skeeter
- Pigskin Parade (1936) as Herbert Van Dyke
- Breezing Home (1937) as Pete Espinosa (uncredited)
- Love Is News (1937) as Egbert Eggleston
- The Devil Is Driving (1937) as Tony Stevens
- They Won't Forget (1937) as Joe Turner
- Wife, Doctor and Nurse (1937) as Glen Wylie
- Danger - Love at Work (1937) as Chemist
- Life Begins in College (1937) as Ollie Stearns
- Thoroughbreds Don't Cry (1937) as Boots Maguire (uncredited)
- Three Blind Mice (1938) as Boy on Bench (uncredited)
- My Lucky Star (1938) as Waldo
- Submarine Patrol (1938) as Seaman Rutherford Davis Pratt, aka 'The Professor'
- Newsboys' Home (1938) as Danny
- Grand Jury Secrets (1939) as Robert Austin / Norman Hazlitt
- He Married His Wife (1940) as Dicky Brown
- Stranger on the Third Floor (1940) as Joe Briggs
- Public Deb No. 1 (1940) as Communist
- Tin Pan Alley (1940) as Joe Codd
- Love Crazy (1941) as Elevator Man
- Sergeant York (1941) as Piano Player (uncredited)
- Man at Large (1941) as Hotel Clerk
- The Maltese Falcon (1941) as Wilmer Cook
- I Wake Up Screaming (1941) as Harry Williams
- Hellzapoppin' (1941) as Harry Selby
- Ball of Fire (1941) as Waiter
- A Gentleman at Heart (1942) as Genius
- Sleepytime Gal (1942) as Ernie
- A-Haunting We Will Go (1942) as Frank Lucas
- Wildcat (1942) as Harold 'Chicopee' Nevins
- Manila Calling (1942) as Gillman
- Kill or Be Killed (1942)
- Baptism of Fire (1943 documentary) as Bill
- Phantom Lady (1944) as Cliff
- Up in Arms (1944) as Info Jones
- Dark Mountain (1944) as Whitey
- Dark Waters (1944) as Cleeve
- Dillinger (1945) as Kirk Otto
- Why Girls Leave Home (1945) as Jimmy Lobo
- Blonde Alibi (1946) as Sam Collins
- Cinderella Jones (1946) as Oliver S. Patch
- The Falcon's Alibi (1946) as Nick
- Joe Palooka, Champ (1946) as Eugene
- Two Smart People (1946) as Fly Feletti
- The Big Sleep (1946) as Harry Jones
- Fall Guy (1947) as Joe
- Born to Kill (1947) as Marty
- The Long Night (1947) as Frank Dunlap
- The Gangster (1947) as Oval
- Flaxy Martin (1949) as Roper
- The Great Gatsby (1949) as Klipspringer
- Behave Yourself (1951) as Albert Jonas
- Don't Bother to Knock (1952) as Eddie Forbes
- Shane (1953) as Stonewall Torrey
- I, the Jury (1953) as Bobo (uncredited)
- Thunder Over the Plains (1953) as Joseph Standish
- The Outlaw's Daughter (1954) as Lewis 'Tulsa' Cook
- Drum Beat (1954) as Blaine Crackel
- Timberjack (1955) as Punky
- Trial (1955) as Finn
- The Indian Fighter (1955) as Briggs
- Indian Agent (1955, TV movie) as Pete, the Cavalry Scout (uncredited)
- The Killing (1956) as George Peatty
- Accused of Murder (1956) as "Whitey" Pollock
- Voodoo Island (1957) as Martin Schuyler
- The Lonely Man (1957) as Willie
- Chicago Confidential (1957) as Candymouth Duggan
- Plunder Road (1957) as Skeets Jonas
- Baby Face Nelson (1957) as Homer van Meter
- House on Haunted Hill (1959) as Watson Pritchard
- Day of the Outlaw (1959) as Larry Teter (town barber)
- Platinum High School (1960) as Harry Nesbit
- College Confidential (1960) as Ted Blake
- One-Eyed Jacks (1961) as Carvey
- Papa's Delicate Condition (1963) as Mr. Keith
- Black Zoo (1963) as Joe
- The Haunted Palace (1963) as Peter Smith / Micah Smith
- Johnny Cool (1963) as Undertaker
- The Judge (1963, TV movie)
- The Glass Cage (1964) as Girl's father
- Blood on the Arrow (1964) as Tex
- McNab's Lab (1966, TV movie) as Coach
- The Spy in the Green Hat (1967) as Arnold
- Welcome to Hard Times (1967) as Hanson
- Rosemary's Baby (1968) as Mr. Nicklas
- Cry for Poor Wally (1969) as Preacher
- The Great Bank Robbery (1969) as Jeb
- The Movie Murderer (1970, TV movie) as Willie Peanuts
- El Condor (1970) as Old Convict
- Night Slaves (1970, TV movie)
- Night Chase (1970, TV movie) as Proprietor
- The Scarecrow (1972, TV movie) as Micah
- The Night Stalker (1972, TV movie) as Mickey Crawford
- The Great Northfield Minnesota Raid (1972) as Bunker
- Blacula (1972) as Sam
- Messiah of Evil (1973) as Charlie
- Pat Garrett & Billy the Kid (1973) as Cody
- Emperor of the North Pole (1973) as Gray Cat
- Electra Glide in Blue (1973) as Willie
- The Outfit (1973) as Carl
- The Phantom of Hollywood (1974, TV movie) as Studio Engineer (uncredited)
- Winterhawk (1975) as Finley
- The Black Bird (1975) as Wilmer Cook
- Senior Power ...and how to use it! (1975) as Henry Boyle
- St. Ives (1976) as Eddie
- Dead of Night (1977, TV movie) as Karel
- Mad Bull (1977, TV movie) as Sweeper
- The Champ (1979) as Georgie
- Salem's Lot (1979, TV movie) as Gordon "Weasel" Phillips
- 1941 (1979) as The Patron (Dexter)
- Tom Horn (1980) as Stablehand
- Carny (1980) as On-Your-Mark
- Harry's War (1981) as Sgt. Billy
- Leave 'em Laughing (1981 TV movie) as Jetter
- National Lampoon's Movie Madness (1982) as Mousy ("Municipalians")
- Hammett (1982) as Eli the Taxi Driver
- Terror at Alcatraz (1982, TV movie) as Hotel Desk Clerk
- This Girl for Hire (1983, TV movie) as Eddie
- Shadow of Sam Penny (1983, TV movie) as Dutch Silver
- Off Sides (Pigs vs. Freaks) (1984, TV movie) as Novatney
- It Came Upon the Midnight Clear (1984, TV movie) as Mr. Bibbs
- Treasure: In Search of the Golden Horse (1984) as Mr. Maps
- The Man Who Broke 1,000 Chains (1987, TV movie) as Pappy Glue

== Television credits ==
- The Honeymooners in Santa and the Bookies. (December 12, 1953)
- Adventures of Superman in "Semi-Private Eye," (January 16, 1954) as Homer Garrity,
- Alfred Hitchcock Presents (1955) (Season 1 Episode 6: "Salvage") as Shorty
- The Life and Legend of Wyatt Earp as "Guns" McCallum
- Perry Mason in "The Case of the Pint-Sized Client" (1958) as Art Crowley
- Gunsmoke in "Matt for Murder" (1958) as Huggins
- Gunsmoke in "Odd Man Out" (1959) as Cyrus Tucker
- Rawhide (1959) as Bain
- Bat Masterson in "No Funeral For Thorn" (1959) as Thorn Loomis (playing Bat's long time friend in a rare "good guy" role)
- The Real McCoys in "The Hermit" (1960) as Harry
- Peter Gunn in "The Long Long Ride" (1960) as Snooker
- Wagon Train in "The Tracy Sadler Story" (1960) as Cadge Waldo
- Tightrope in "The Long Odds" (1960) as Sam Parker
- Tombstone Territory in "The Witness" (1960) as Adam Kirby
- The Rebel in "The Bequest" (1960) as Jeremy Hake
- Thriller in "The Fatal Impulse" (1960) as The Assassin
- The Islanders in "The Twenty-Six Paper" (1961) as Tomas
- Surfside 6 in "Witness for the Defense" (1961) as Mike Pulaski
- The Deputy in "Brand of Honesty" (1961) as Miller
- Laramie in "The Tumbleweed Wagon" (1961) as Doc
- Rawhide (1961) – Joel Turner in S3:E22, "Incident in the Middle of Nowhere"
- Outlaws in "The Dark Sunrise of Griff Kincaid" (1962) as Cully
- The Dakotas in "A Nice Girl from Goliath" (1963) as Brinkman
- Gunsmoke in "Hung High" (1964) as George
- Gunsmoke in "Breckinridge" (1965) as Jackie Beal (S10E25)
- The Wild Wild West in "The Night of the Double-Edged Knife" (1965) as Mike McGreavy and "The Night of the Bars of Hell" (1966) as Gideon McCoy
- Star Trek in "Court Martial" (1967) as Samuel T. Cogley, Esq
- The Ghost & Mrs. Muir in "Not So Desperate Hours" as Frankie.
- The Odd Couple in "Our Fathers" (1974) as Eliot Ness
- Mannix in "The Green Man" (1974) as Herbie
- Starsky & Hutch in "Lady Blue" (1975) as Polly the snitch
- The Bionic Woman in "Once a Thief" (1977) as Inky (credited as Elisha Cook)
- Insight in "The Trouble with Grandpa" (1982) as Grandpa
- Magnum, P.I. (1980s) as Francis "Ice Pick" Hofstetler in 13 episodes (final television appearance)
- Night Court in "Married Alive" (1985) as Wilbur Posten
- The Twilight Zone in "Welcome to Winfield" (1986) as Weldon
- The A-Team (1985) in Season 4 Ep. 5 "Road To Hope" as Jim Beam
- ALF in "We're So Sorry, Uncle Albert" (1988) as Uncle Albert
