= The Trouble with Grandpa =

- Insight episode
- Episode no.: Season 22; Episode 9
- Directed by: Mike Rhodes
- Written by: Lan O'Kun
- Original air date: January 21, 1982
- Running time: 30 minutes

Guest appearances
- Elisha Cook Jr.; Meg Tilly; Millie Perkins

"The Trouble with Grandpa" is a 1982 episode of the syndicated American religious-themed anthology television series Insight starring Elisha Cook Jr. and Meg Tilly (in her television debut). The episode was produced in 1981 by Paulist Productions and originally aired on January 21, 1982, as a presentation of Capital Cities Family Specials.

== Plot ==
The relationship between a 17-year-old girl named Dori (Meg Tilly) and her 75-year-old grandfather "Grampa" (Elisha Cook Jr.) living in a trailer by the sea. Dori, who has lost her parents, is very insecure and believes herself to be plain, inept and friendless, while her grandfather is active and loves to swim. Together, they are two lonely people both dependent upon each other – he worries about her and she worries about him. When her grandfather soon begins to show signs of senility, Dori must face the possibility of him becoming ever more dependent upon her. She rises to the challenge, getting a new appreciation of herself in the process.

== Cast ==
- Elisha Cook Jr. as Grandpa
- Meg Tilly as Dori
- Millie Perkins as Dr. Langly
- Lee Lucas as Paul
