= Richard Sterling =

Richard Sterling (born in Sebastopol, California, 3 April 1953) is a travel, food and lifestyle journalist, as well as one of the foremost practitioners of the "literature of gusto". Originally from Northern California, he spent many years as a sailor, an engineer, and a diarist before becoming a journalist.

== Early life ==
Sterling is of mixed British and German ancestry. He spent his childhood in the forested areas of Northern California where his family made a living in the timber industry. After the timber industry collapsed the family moved in several places in California. At age 18 he graduated at Vallejo High School. After a brief experience as lumberjack and quarryman he joined the U.S. Navy, where he spent seven years, mainly in South East Asia.

== Literary career ==
He is a pioneer of culinary literature in English. He was encouraged in this by correspondence with the writer M. F. K. Fisher, to whom he dedicated his first book, Dining with Headhunters:Jungle Feasts and Other Culinary Adventures. The author of more than a dozen books, Sterling has been honored by the James Beard Foundation for his food writing, and he holds the Lowell Thomas Award and the ForeWord Award for travel literature. The New York Times book page dubbed him "Indiana Jones of Gastronomy" for his willingness to "go anywhere and court any danger" for the sake of a good meal and a good story. He is also the principal author of Lonely Planet's award-winning World Food series. He has appeared many times on TV and radio in USA, Europe, Australia, and Vietnam.

He resides in Cambodia. Prior to that he lived and wrote in Vietnam, where his food and drink column "Sterling's Saigon" appeared monthly in Asia Life magazine for 48 months.

== Selected bibliography ==
- The Adventure of Food : True Stories of Eating Everything. Travelers' Tales. 1999. ISBN 1-885211-37-6.
- The Fearless Diner: Travel Tips and Wisdom for Eating Around the World. Travelers' Tales. 2000. ISBN 1-885211-22-8.
- Lonely Planet World Food Spain (Lonely Planet World Food Guides). Lonely Planet Publications. 2000. ISBN 1-86450-025-5.
- The Fire Never Dies: One Man's Raucous Romp Down the Road of Food, Passion and Adventure. Travelers' Tales. 2001. ISBN 1-885211-70-8.
- Lonely Planet World Food California (Lonely Planet World Food Guides). Lonely Planet Publications. 2003. ISBN 1-74059-430-4.
- How to Eat Around the World: Tips and Wisdom. Travelers' Tales. 2005. ISBN 1-932361-22-7.
- The Unofficial Guide to San Francisco. Wiley. 2006. ISBN 0-471-77638-6.
