= Dinner with Friends (2001 film) =

2001 television film by Norman Jewison

- Based on: Dinner with Friends by Donald Margulies
- Written by: Donald Margulies
- Directed by: Norman Jewison
- Starring: Dennis Quaid; Andie MacDowell; Greg Kinnear; Toni Collette
- Music by: Dave Grusin
- Country of origin: United States
- Original language: English

Production
- Producer: Patrick Markey
- Cinematography: Roger Deakins
- Editor: Ronald Sanders
- Running time: 94 minutes
- Production companies: HBO Films; Nina Saxon Film Design

Original release
- Network: HBO
- Release: August 11, 2001

Dinner with Friends is a 2001 HBO comedy-drama film directed by Norman Jewison. It is an adaptation of the 1998 play of the same name by Donald Margulies.

== Plot ==
Gabe, Karen, Tom, and Beth have been friends for years. Gabe and Karen, expecting the other couple for a dinner party, receive only Beth, who initially states Tom is away for business. As the dinner winds down, Beth tearfully admits Tom is leaving her for a flight attendant (actually a travel agent) as he is not happy in their marriage. Beth paints Tom as solely wanting sex from her, pointing to an incident at a movie theatre where he attempted to initiate intercourse. During this, Gabe and Karen demonstrate different approaches to the news, with Karen prompting questions out of Beth while Gabe simply listened. After Beth leaves, Gabe and Karen discuss the news, with Karen immediately taking it at face value and disparaging Tom while Gabe defends him. Karen declares he is no longer her friend. Gabe takes offence to learning that should he cheat on Karen she would immediately write him off and throw him out.

Tom arrives home after his flight is cancelled. After a terse discussion when he inquires about the get together, Tom deduces Beth told them they were divorcing after they'd decided they would tell them together. He deems this unfair as they are now biased against him. Their argument escalates as they begin attacking one another and Tom pins her to the bed. However, they begin to make passionate love to one another. Tom leaves shortly after and travels to Gabe and Karen's, hoping to explain his side of things. Karen refuses, stating it's clear cut he is in the wrong. Gabe fixes Tom a plate of the earlier meal, and asks Tom to explain things. He explains how he feels unloved now with Beth, how she rejects any form of intimacy. This led Tom to seek this out in the travel agent. Gabe asks them if he and Beth planned to attend therapy together, not wanting them to end their marriage. Tom says no, not wanting Gabe's opinion, just his understanding. Tom then departs.

A flashback to 1988 Martha's Vineyard shows the day when Gabe and Karen first introduced Tom to Beth at their summer home. Tom is initially unreceptive, having been reminded of her drunken dancing at Gabe and Karen's wedding, as well as their first discussion being fairly awkward and snide toward one another, but they gradually warm to one another. In the present, Tom packs up his belongings and leaves his and Beth's home.

Some months pass by, with Karen and Beth discussing the fallout of the divorce amongst themselves, and Gabe and Tom amongst themselves. Tom has maintained a relationship with the travel agent, named Nancy, and Beth is now seeing someone as well, named David. Karen is shocked at this, insisting Beth should've spent some time alone after divorcing Tom. Beth disputes this, and then states she intends to marry David. She then accuses Karen of not wanting her to be truly happy so she can be superior to her. Karen replies she had hoped to forge a new family amongst her friends after escaping from her own troubled family, with Beth telling her it’s just not that simple, no one is perfect. During Tom's discussion with Gabe, he talks about how happy he is with Nancy. Gabe sarcastically reminds Tom that he's there to listen as Tom doesn't want his opinion. Tom asserts that he was unhappy during the duration of his marriage and that most of the time he was putting on a show of happiness so as to not cause a problem. Gabe takes this personally, as their lives have always been a shared one, and feels Tom's unhappiness applies to him and Karen. He then explains to Tom how he had hoped that they would share the experience of growing old together in their marriages and that leaving Beth spoiled that. As they are parting ways, Tom reveals to Gabe that Beth and David actually had an affair much earlier in their marriage. Gabe shares this with Karen when they return to Martha's Vineyard, changing her perspective of the divorce and feeling hurt Beth never shared this with her. Later that night, they both confess they've grown to no longer feel close to their friends. Karen shares a dream she had of her and Gabe making love next to another couple, who are also them. She is angered when Gabe initially doesn't say anything but he finally says it is symbolic of the natural evolution of a relationship. She frets about how they'll not follow the same path as Tom and Beth. Gabe reassures her by "scaring" her (a tease he does to show her his affection) and kisses her. She kisses him back.

== Cast ==
- Dennis Quaid as Gabe
- Andie MacDowell as Karen
- Greg Kinnear as Tom
- Toni Collette as Beth
- Ruth Reichl as Herself

== Reception ==
On review aggregator Rotten Tomatoes, Dinner with Friends has an approval rating of 90% based on 10 reviews, with an average rating of 6.4/10.

Steven Oxman of Variety wrote: "What makes Dinner with Friends such an impressive work is Margulies’ ability to bring feelings of loss and the fear of change to the forefront in a truly honest fashion, without forcing the issues too bluntly."

== Accolades ==
The film was nominated for two Emmys, including Outstanding Made for Television Movie.
