= The Adventures of Chich =

Canadian children's television series

- Genre: children's puppet
- Created by: John Conway
- Country of origin: Canada
- Original language: English
- No. of seasons: 2
- No. of episodes: 24

Production
- Producer: John Conway
- Production locations: Toronto, ON Canada
- Running time: 15 minutes

Original release
- Network: CBC Television
- Release: 6 October 1958 – 23 March 1959

Related
- Uncle Chichimus

The Adventures of Chich is a Canadian children's television series that aired on CBC Television from 1958 to 1959.

== Premise ==
This series marked the return of puppet characters Uncle Chichimus (Let's See) and Hollyhock, his niece and housekeeper. Each episode features a human cast member played in rotation by Tom Kneebone, Larry Mann or Helene Winston. John Conway was the series creator, producer and puppeteer.

Alternate titles were Uncle Chichimus and Uncle Chichimus Tells a Story.

== Scheduling ==
The 15-minute series was broadcast Mondays at 5:15 p.m. (Eastern) from 6 October 1958 to 23 March 1959.
