= Agnes of God (film) =

1985 film by Norman Jewison

- Theatrical release poster
- Directed by: Norman Jewison
- Screenplay by: John Pielmeier
- Based on: Agnes of God; 1982 play by John Pielmeier
- Produced by: Norman Jewison; Patrick J. Palmer
- Starring: Jane Fonda; Anne Bancroft; Meg Tilly
- Cinematography: Sven Nykvist
- Edited by: Antony Gibbs
- Music by: Georges Delerue
- Distributed by: Columbia Pictures
- Release date: August 21, 1985
- Running time: 99 minutes
- Country: United States
- Language: English
- Budget: $7.5 million
- Box office: $25.6 million

Agnes of God is a 1985 American mystery drama film directed by Norman Jewison and starring Jane Fonda, Anne Bancroft and Meg Tilly. It was written by John Pielmeier, based on his 1979 play of the same name. The plot is about a novice nun (Tilly) who gives birth and insists that the dead child was the result of a virginal conception. A psychiatrist (Fonda) and the mother superior (Bancroft) of the convent clash during the resulting investigation.

Despite generally mixed reviews from critics, the film was nominated for three Academy Awards: Best Actress (Bancroft), Best Supporting Actress (Tilly), and Best Original Score. Tilly won the Golden Globe for Best Supporting Actress, while Bancroft was nominated for the Golden Globe Award for Best Actress in a Motion Picture – Drama. Pielmeier received a Writers Guild of America Award nomination for his screenplay.

The film was a financial success, as it grossed $25,627,836 domestically against a $7.5 million budget.

== Plot ==
In a Roman Catholic convent in Montreal, Quebec, the nuns are awakened by screams coming from the room of Sister Agnes, a young novice. Agnes is found in her room bleeding profusely, and in a basket, Mother Superior Miriam finds a dead infant.

Sister Agnes is charged with manslaughter, so court psychiatrist Martha Livingston is assigned to determine if she is competent to stand trial. In an interview, Agnes claims she does not remember being pregnant or giving birth, and shows a lack of understanding of how babies are conceived. Mother Miriam tells Livingston that Agnes is an "innocent" who was kept at home by her mother and knows nothing about the world. She is desperate to keep Agnes naive and declares that she could not have known what pregnancy was or remember the father.

Mother Miriam tells Livingston about the time Agnes stopped eating in the belief she was getting fat and then exhibited stigmata in her hand that healed itself within a day. Agnes tells Livingston of her friendship with Sister Marie-Paul, the oldest nun, who showed her a "secret place" – a bell tower, which she then shows Livingston. They argue about Agnes' mother and birth and how much Agnes knows about sex and pregnancy.

Mother Miriam tells Livingston that Agnes must have conceived on January 23 because that is the night Agnes burned her bedsheets confessing they were "stained". While looking around the convent grounds, Livingston comes across a barn. She and a young Monsignor argue about whether her lack of faith will leave her unable to treat Agnes with dignity. Livingston learns that Agnes' mother was verbally and sexually abusive, telling her she was a "mistake"; and that Agnes is Mother Miriam's niece.

Livingston receives permission from the court to hypnotize Agnes, but Mother Miriam is strongly against it, believing it will strip her of her innocence. While hypnotized, Agnes admits she gave birth and that another woman in the convent knew about her pregnancy; however, Agnes refuses to reveal who the woman was. Livingston discovers that a workroom in the convent has a concealed staircase to a tunnel leading to the barn. (An archivist explains that many old convents have "secret" tunnels to let the nuns move between buildings during the winter.) Mother Miriam tries to have Livingston removed from the case, but she appeals to the court authorities and is retained.

Livingston obtains a second court order to put Agnes under hypnosis again. Mother Miriam admits that she knew Agnes was pregnant and put the wastebasket in her room but denies she killed the baby. Under hypnosis, Agnes reveals that on the night Sister Marie-Paul died, she told Agnes she had seen "Him" from the bell tower and directed Agnes to meet "Him" in the barn. Under questioning, she appears to describe an encounter with a real presence – human or divine. Suddenly, Agnes exhibits stigmata in her hands and begins bleeding profusely. Agnes declares that "He" raped her, and that she hates God for it. She admits that Mother Miriam was present when the baby was born but then left briefly; whereupon Agnes killed the child believing that, like herself, the baby was a "mistake".

Agnes is found not guilty by reason of insanity and returned to the convent where a doctor can "visit" periodically. She tells the judge that she heard "Him" singing beneath her bedroom window for six nights in a row, and then on the seventh night, he lay on top of her, implying that she may have been raped and impregnated by a trespasser.

== Cast ==
- Jane Fonda as Dr. Martha Livingston
- Anne Bancroft as Mother Miriam Ruth (religious name); Anna Maria Burchetti (birth name)
- Meg Tilly as Sister Agnes Devereaux
- Anne Pitoniak as Mrs. Livingston, the mother of Martha
- Winston Rekert as Det. Langevin
- Gratien Gélinas as Father Martineau
- Guy Hoffman as Justice Joseph Leveau
- Gabriel Arcand as Monsignor
- Françoise Faucher as Eve LeClaire
- Jacques Tourangeau as Eugene Lyon

== Filming ==
Agnes of God was filmed at the former Rockwood Academy in Rockwood, Ontario and mainly in Montreal, also in Boucherville on the south shore of Montreal (Sainte-Famille church).

== Reaction ==
=== Reception ===
Agnes of God was greeted with mixed reviews upon release and currently has a rating of 44% on Rotten Tomatoes based on 32 critics. Reviewers praised the lead performances, but felt that there were holes in the plot and movement. Gene Siskel rated the film 21/2-stars-out-of-4, writing that it played "with some challenging ideas and some sensationalistic events, but ultimately it fails to earn its right to toy with such subjects." He singled out the cast for praise: "Fonda does get into character convincingly, which is a major achievement considering what a character she has become in her own right. Bancroft is subdued and not maudlin as she is capable of being. And Tilly is as other-worldly as one could want. But what's lacking is a clear conception on Jewison's part as to what this film is about." Roger Ebert similarly sided, giving it one star and saying that though it "deals in the basic materials of a criminal investigation (cynical cops, forensic details, courtroom testimony), it has a seriously clouded agenda."

Leonard Maltin had a much more positive response to the film, rating it 31/2-stars-out-of-4, and describing it as "Disturbing, not always satisfying, but electrified by three lead performances, and beautifully photographed by Sven Nykvist." Frederic and Mary Ann Brussat of Spirituality & Practice were also enthusiastic: "Norman Jewison has done a fine job translating this work from the stage to the screen. He draws out an uncanny performance from Meg Tilly in the lead role and two excellent character portraits from Jane Fonda and Anne Bancroft. Cinematographer Sven Nykvist is an old hand at stark religious dramas and his work here creates just the right visual atmosphere for this very impressive drama about the clash between reason and faith."

=== Awards and nominations ===
Award	Category	Recipients	Result	Ref.
Academy Awards	Best Actress	Anne Bancroft	Nominated	
Academy Awards	Best Supporting Actress	Meg Tilly	Nominated	
Academy Awards	Best Original Score	Georges Delerue	Nominated	
Golden Globe Awards	Best Actress in a Motion Picture – Drama	Anne Bancroft	Nominated	
Golden Globe Awards	Best Supporting Actress – Motion Picture	Meg Tilly	Won	
Karlovy Vary International Film Festival	Best Actress	Anne Bancroft	Won	
Karlovy Vary International Film Festival	Best Actress	Jane Fonda	Won	
Karlovy Vary International Film Festival	Best Actress	Meg Tilly	Won	
Writers Guild of America Awards	Best Screenplay – Based on Material from Another Medium	John Pielmeier	Nominated	
