= Adelaide Bean =

American actress

- Born: Connecticut, U.S.
- Died: 1999
- Occupations: Actress, journalist, theatre producer, playwright
- Years active: 1928–1980s
- Known for: Executive secretary of the Theater Arts Committee (TAC)
- Notable work: Bless the Child

Adelaide Bean was an American actress, a journalist, and a member of the Communist Party of the United States of America.

== Early life ==
Adelaide Bean was born in Connecticut, where she studied music and voice at the Oxford School in Hartford and graduated in 1928. Her first theatrical role was playing piano for the traveling Jitney Players. She then taught music in Sarasota, Florida, for two years before moving to New York City to focus on acting.

== Career ==
In New York, Bean's first big acting roles were in the original Broadway productions of The Late Christopher Bean and Eugene O'Neill's Ah, Wilderness. She worked as Herman Shumlin's assistant on The Children's Hour. Shortly after, she produced the original Broadway production of Let Freedom Ring by Albert Bein, which depicts textile strikes in the South.

In 1935-1936, during the Spanish Civil War, Bean produced a play about Spain titled Who Fights This Battle with Joseph Losey as director and Kenneth White as writer. It was written and produced in ten days with 60 actors, at least 50 of which were earning a living through the Works Progress Administration's Federal Theatre Project. There were only three performances.

From Who Fights This Battle came the Theatre Committee to Aid Spanish Democracy, which eventually turned into the Theater Arts Committee (TAC). Adelaide Bean was TAC's executive secretary, and she produced the TAC Cabaret in 1938, which featured political works such as Joe Hill, Peat Bog Soldiers, and Strange Fruit. Performances took place at the Firehouse Theater, and proceeds of the Cabaret helped war relief in Spain. The TAC Cabaret was also influential in the creation of the Actors Front to Win the War, spurred on by Charlie Chaplin.

Bean joined the Communist Party in March 1936, and she and many of her colleagues became involved in the rank and file movement of the Actors' Equity Association.

Throughout the 1940s and 1950s, Adelaide Bean performed in many New York theaters, including the Pulitzer Prize Playhouse, Celanese Theater, Hallmark Hall of Fame, the Firehouse Theater, and others. She also had many television roles. In 1953, however, she was blacklisted from the television industry after another actor reported that she had tried to recruit him to the Communist Party.

Following the blacklisting, Bean moved from New York to Chicago. She continued to work in theater, as well as doing a variety of other jobs to get by. She worked with Barrie Stavis on his play Joe Hill, and was an acting member of the Resident Company of the Cherry County Playhouse in Traverse City, Michigan during the 1957 summer season.

In the early 1960s, Adelaide Bean wrote and produced Bless the Child, which premiered at Karamu Theatre in 1963. It was co-authored by Bernice Blohm and directed by Reuben Silver, with music by Irma Jurist. The play centers a group of women workers at a Chicago electrical parts factory.

Bean was co-editor of Labor Today from 1971-1974. In 1974, Communist Party chairman Gus Hall asked Bean to be the arts editor for the Communist Party's newspaper, The People's Daily World. She accepted his invitation and moved back to New York City, where she wrote for the World into the late 1980s.

Bean died in 1999.
