= California Virtual Academies =

Location
- 2360 Shasta Way, Unit A Simi Valley, California 93065; United States
- Coordinates: 34.277461°N 118.788694°W

Information
- Type: Virtual charter school
- Opened: September 2002; 23 years ago
- Executive Director: Katrina Abston
- Dean: Laura Terrazas
- Head of school: April Warren
- Grades: Kindergarten – 12th grade
- Affiliation: K12 Inc.
- Website: www.k12.com/cava

California Virtual Academies (CAVA) are nine virtual charter schools with business agreements with the curriculum-provider K12 Inc. The nine virtual charter schools are CAVA@Fresno, CAVA@Kings, CAVA@Los Angeles, CAVA@Maricopa, CAVA@San Diego, CAVA@San Joaquin, CAVA@San Mateo, CAVA@Sonoma, and CAVA@Sutter.

Although all public charter schools are nonprofit organizations, they are affiliated with a for-profit company, K12 Inc. Each of the nine academies has its own independent board of directors. Each of the California Virtual Academies follow the educational principles of E.D. Hirsch Jr.

Each student of the California Virtual Academies is assigned to a California-credentialed homeroom teacher with 30–35 students each. The academies, like most K12 Inc.-supplied schools, loan the student textbooks, materials, and a computer so the student can access online lessons.

== Classification and accreditation ==
Each of the California Virtual Academies is considered a public cyber charter school, not a home school. Each of the California Virtual Academies is accredited by the Accrediting Commission for Schools of the Western Association of Schools and Colleges, and each of the California Virtual Academies must meet the requirements of the ACS.

Most courses are approved by the University of California as meeting its a-g high school requirements. As of 2017, some of the laboratory science and art courses are acknowledged as meeting the University of California requirements because they add physical meeting locations to meet the in-person instructional requirements. Minimum attendance days, physical fitness, and participation in state tests is required.

== Notable alumni ==
- Thia Megia, singer and actress

=== Notable staff ===
- Walter Klenhard, film director, board president and member

== See also ==
- Elluminate Live
- Ohio Virtual Academy
- Wisconsin Virtual Academy
