= Paul Theroux bibliography =

List of works by or about Paul Theroux, American novelist, short story writer and travel writer.

== Fiction ==
=== Novels ===
- Waldo, 1967
- Fong and the Indians, 1968
- Girls at Play, 1969, ISBN 978-0-370-01401-2
- Murder in Mount Holly, 1969
- Jungle Lovers, 1971, ISBN 978-0-14-005496-5
- Saint Jack, 1973,
- The Black House, 1974, ISBN 978-0-14-008792-5
- The Family Arsenal, 1976, ISBN 978-0-395-24400-5
- Picture Palace, 1978
- The Mosquito Coast, 1981, ISBN 978-0547525174
- Doctor Slaughter (1984) – filmed as Half Moon Street (1986)
- O-Zone. New York: G. P. Putnam's Sons. 1986. ISBN 0399131868.
- My Secret History. New York: G. P. Putnam's Sons. 1989. ISBN 0399134247.
- Chicago Loop (1990)
- Dr. DeMarr (1990)
- Millroy the Magician (1993)
- The Greenest Island (1995)
- My Other Life (1996)
- Kowloon Tong (1997)
- Hotel Honolulu (2001)
- Nurse Wolf and Dr. Sacks (2001)
- Blinding Light (2006)
- A Dead Hand: A Crime in Calcutta (2009)
- The Lower River (2012)
- Mother Land (2017)
- Under the Wave at Waimea (2021)
- The Bad Angel Brothers (2022)
- Burma Sahib (2024)

=== Short story collections ===
- Sinning with Annie and other stories, 1972, ISBN 978-0-395-13996-7
- The Consul's File, 1977, ISBN 978-0-395-25399-1
- World's End and Other Stories, 1980
- The London Embassy, 1982, ISBN 978-0-14-006570-1
- The Collected Stories. New York: Penguin Group. 1997. ISBN 0-670-86127-8.
- The Stranger at the Palazzo D'Oro and Other Stories, 2004
- The Elephanta Suite, 2007
- Mr. Bones: Twenty Stories, 2014
- The Vanishing Point: Stories, 2025

=== Christmas books ===
- A Christmas Card, 1978, illustrations by John Lawrence, ISBN 978-0395272046
- London Snow, 1980, illustrations by John Lawrence, ISBN 978-0395294581

=== Stories ===
Title	Year	First published	Reprinted/collected	Notes
The prison diary of Jack Faust	1970	Theroux, Paul (September, 1970). The prison diary of Jack Faust. Playboy. 17 (9): 135, 138, 258-264.	Sinning with Annie	Construction by William Koralewski
Dog days	1971	Theroux, Paul (November, 1971). Dog Days. Playboy. 18 (11): 181-182, 240-243	Sinning with Annie	Illustration by Kinuko Craft
Dengue Fever	1975	Theroux, Paul (November, 1975). Dengue fever. Playboy. 22 (11): 148-154	The Consul's File	Illustrations by Bill Imhoff
Set of two	1977	Theroux, Paul (March, 1977). Set of two. Playboy. 24 (3): 114-116, 176.		Illustrations by Tom James
Sex and its substitutes	1982	Theroux, Paul (December, 1982). Sex and its substitutes. Playboy. 24 (3): 173, 178, 267-272	The London Embassy	
Shortest Day of the Year: A Christmas Fantasy	1986	Sixth Chamber Press		Illustrated by Sebastian Carter
The Furies	2013	Theroux, Paul (February 25, 2013). "The Furies". The New Yorker. 89 (2): 66–73.	Mr. Bones	
Action	2014	Theroux, Paul (August 4, 2014). "Action". The New Yorker. 90 (22): 58–62.	Mr. Bones	

== Non-fiction ==
External videos
- Interview with Theroux on Sir Vidia's Shadow, November 19, 1998, C-SPAN
- Booknotes interview with Theroux on Dark Star Safari, May 18, 2003, C-SPAN
- Presentation by Theroux on Ghost Train to the Eastern Star, September 27, 2008, C-SPAN
- Presentation by Theroux on On the Plain of Snakes, October 10, 2019, C-SPAN
- Presentation by Theroux on On the Plain of Snakes, October 12, 2019, C-SPAN

=== Travel ===
- The Great Railway Bazaar (1975)
- The Old Patagonian Express (1979)
- The Kingdom by the Sea (1983)
- Sailing Through China (1984)
- Riding the Iron Rooster (1988)
- The Happy Isles of Oceania (1992)
- The Pillars of Hercules (1995)
- Dark Star Safari (2002)
- Ghost Train to the Eastern Star (2008)
- The Last Train to Zona Verde (2013)
- Deep South: Four Seasons on Back Roads (2015)
- On the Plain of Snakes: A Mexican Journey (2019)
- True North: On the Road in Canada (2026)

=== Travel collections ===
- Sunrise with Seamonsters, 1985
- To the Ends of the Earth: The Selected Travels of Paul Theroux, 1990
- Travelling The World: The Illustrated Travels of Paul Theroux, 1990
- Fresh Air Fiend: Travel Writings (2000)
- The Tao of Travel (2011)
- Figures in a Landscape: People and Places (2018)

=== Miscellaneous travel ===
- The Imperial Way, photography by Steve McCurry, 1985
- Patagonia Revisited, with Bruce Chatwin, 1985

=== On V. S. Naipaul ===
- V. S. Naipaul: An Introduction to his Work (1972)
- Sir Vidia's Shadow (1998)

== Critical studies and reviews of Theroux's work ==
Mr Bones

- Meyers, Jeffrey (21–27 November 2014). "Furies unleashed". New Statesman. 143 (5237): 52.
