= Ghost Train to the Eastern Star =

2008 book by Paul Theroux

- Author: Paul Theroux
- Language: English
- Genre: Travel
- Publisher: Houghton Mifflin
- Publication date: 2008

Ghost Train to the Eastern Star is a 2008 train travel book by Paul Theroux.

== Summary ==
In this book, he retraces some of the trips described in The Great Railway Bazaar. He travels from London, through Europe on the Orient Express and then through Turkey, Turkmenistan, India, Sri Lanka, Vietnam, and Japan before making his way home on the Trans-Siberian Railway. He realizes that what has really changed compared to his first trip is himself and not just the countries. Theroux was 33 years old at the time of the first book, and twice that age for the second trip. In his trip, Theroux encounters beauty and kindness but also various troubling and dysfunctional countries, plagued by poverty, over-crowding, dictators, government control and oppression. This book is similar in concept to the Dark Star Safari, his account of returning to see how Africa had changed, in the long interval since his time of living and working there while an early member of the Peace Corps. Theroux's travel coincides with the early part of the American invasion of Iraq. A previous book, The Happy Isles of Oceania, coincided with the First Gulf War. Theroux includes his experiences with people and their reaction to these wars in his work.

== Encounters with literary figures ==
In the course of his travels, Theroux arranges meetings with several noteworthy figures of the literary scene. In Istanbul, Turkey, Theroux encounters writer and Nobel Prize in Literature recipient Orhan Pamuk. He also meets briefly with Elif Safak. In Sri Lanka, the science fiction writer Arthur C. Clarke agrees to a visit from the author. Haruki Murakami, Japan's most widely read author, spends several days with Theroux, guiding him around various Japanese cities and landmarks. Before leaving Japan for Russia, Theroux explores the area around the city of Nara with Pico Iyer.
