= Bob Swaim =

American film director (born 1943)

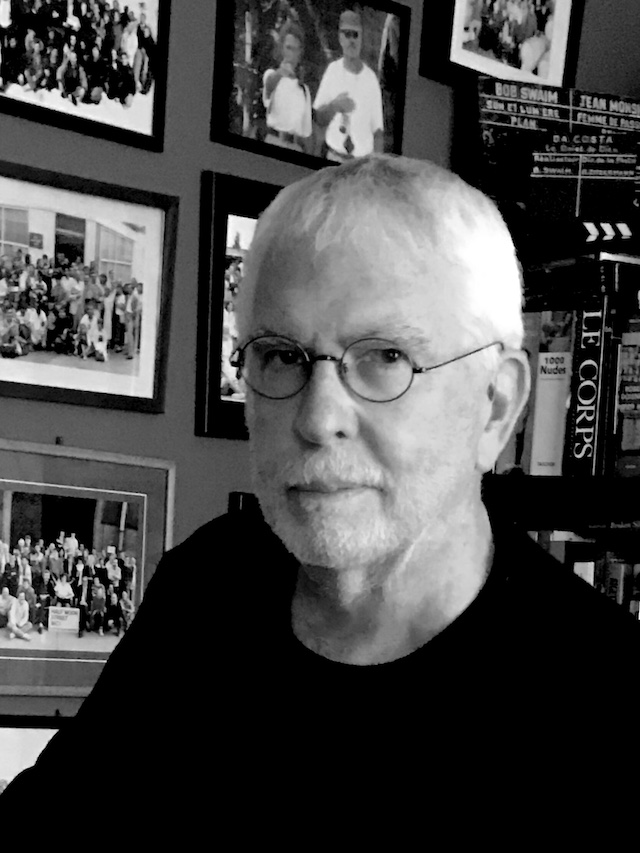
- Bob Swaim in his office in Paris in 2020.
- Born: Robert Frank Swaim, Jr. November 2, 1943 (age 82); Evanston, Illinois

Robert Frank "Bob" Swaim, Jr. (born November 2, 1943) is an American film director who has lived and worked essentially in France.

== Life and career ==
Swaim was born in Evanston, Illinois, and was the son of Eleanor (Connor) and Robert Frank Swaim. He grew up in the Reseda area of Los Angeles and graduated from Reseda High School in 1961. He received a degree in anthropology from California State University, Northridge, then called San Fernando Valley State College, in 1965.

Swaim then went to France to work on his doctorate in ethnology. He studied at the Collège de France with Claude Lévi-Strauss and at L'École des Langues Orientales with Georges Ballandier. However, spending most of his free time at the French Cinématheque, he quickly became interested in filmmaking, dropped out of his doctoral program and entered l'École Nationale de la Cinématographie et la Photographie, later known as École Nationale Supérieure Louis-Lumière.

After graduating in 1970, Swaim spent most of the following decade writing and directing documentaries and commercials. Unable to break into the closed world of feature films, he founded, along with several other young filmmakers, a film company to produce their own films. During the few years of their existence, they produced over fifty theatrical short films of young filmmakers, including three short films that Swaim wrote, directed and produced. The three films won numerous international prizes and awards and enabled Swaim to write and direct his first feature film, La Nuit de Saint Germain des Prés (1977) starring Michel Galabru, Mort Shuman, and, for the first time on screen, Daniel Auteuil. The film marked the re-discovery of a long forgotten French writer, Leo Malet, and introduced his character Nestor Burma to a new generation of mystery fans.

The La Nuit de Saint-Germain-des-Prés, shown at the Director's Fortnight at the Cannes Film Festival, was a critical success but a box office failure, and it was four years before Swaim directed his next feature, La Balance. La Balance was not only one of the biggest box office successes in the history of French cinema, but it also changed the face of the French police film. Le Monde wrote, "Avec La Balance, Bob Swaim a réinventé le film policier" ("With La Balance, Bob Swaim has reinvented the police film"). The film received eight César Award nominations, winning Best Picture, Best Actor (Philippe Léotard), and Best Actress (Nathalie Baye).

La Balance became an international success and led to Swaim's first Hollywood contract. In 1986, Swaim wrote and directed Half Moon Street, adapted from Paul Theroux's award-winning novel Doctor Slaughter. The film starred Sigourney Weaver and Michael Caine and introduced French actor Vincent Lindon.

Swaim, now in Hollywood, signed a contract with MGM as a director, writer, and producer in 1987. There he developed several projects for MGM and directed Masquerade for the studio in 1988, starring Rob Lowe and Meg Tilly. Disenchanted with Hollywood and the studio system, Swaim returned to France where he set up a company to develop European projects for American producers.

In 1989, Swaim left for Rome where he spent two years writing and directing L'Atlantide for Italian producer Roberto Ciccuto. The 19th century adventure drama, shot in Studio 5 at Cinecittà in Rome and in the southern desert of Morocco, starred Tchéky Karyo, Jean Rochefort, Anna Galiena and Fernando Rey.

After L'Atlantide, Swaim went back to Paris and for the next few years developed Police-Secrets, a television series for France Télévisions. The series, consisting of twelve 90-minute films, was one of the first realistic police dramas on French television. It set the tone and pace for the numerous French police series which followed. Apart from writing and producing the series, Swaim also directed several 90 minute films for France Télévision and Canal+.

In 1997, Swaim returned to the movies, directing The Climb (1997–1998) starring John Hurt and David Strathairn. The film was one of Swaim's most critically acclaimed films, winning prizes in numerous festivals including the UNICEF Prize for Best Film at the Berlin Film Festival.

Swaim then adapted Giovanni's Room, the American novel by James Baldwin, for James Ivory and Ismail Merchant. In 2001, Gerard Mortier, director of the Salzburg Festival, asked Swaim to direct the Leoš Janáček opera, Jenůfa with Hildegard Behrens and Karita Mattila, and with John Eliot Gardiner conducting. The opera was the critical and popular success of the festival.

The following year, Swaim began working on his first comedy, Cheap Shot. The film went into production in 2003 and was released in the summer of 2004 under the name Nos Amis les Flics. The film, starring Daniel Auteuil, Frédéric Diefenthal and Lorant Deutsch, won the Grand Prix du Festival de Saint-Malo that year.

Aside from writing, directing and producing, Swaim has acted in several films, including John Landis's Spies Like Us, Caroline Huppert's J'ai Deux Amours, James Ivory's A Soldier's Daughter Never Cries, and Florence Quentin's Ole, starring Gérard Depardieu and Gad Elmaleh.

In 1993, Swaim joined the Association Équinoxe, a screenwriting workshop founded by Jeanne Moreau. The workshops were designed to give an international profile and resonance to selected French and European projects, allowing them to reach a variety of audiences in a more direct way. Since 1993, almost 8000 screenplays have been submitted and over 200 writers selected, 135 international advisers, and 65 films produced and released. In 2003, Swaim was elected to the Board of Directors of Équinoxe.

He has also been an adviser-consultant at the Performing Arts Lab for Screenwriters in Kent, England, and at the Australian Film Commission's workshop in Sydney. Additionally, he has been a guest lecturer at New York University and Columbia University. He has also taught acting at Andreas Voutsinas' Theatre des 50 L'Atelier and the VO/VF Acting School.

In the early 2000s, Swaim was writing his next feature film, Pigalle-Barbès (provisional title), a thriller that takes place in Paris during the Algerian War. He was also preparing a documentary for France Télévisions on the First Congress of Black Writers and Artists that took place in Paris in 1956 as part of the Année des Cultures Francophones-2006. In 2007, he returned to the stage, to direct a Blues Odyssey at the Théâtre du Châtelet.

== Director ==
- 1971 : L'Autoportrait d'un pornographe
- 1972 : Vive les Jacques
- 1977 : La Nuit de Saint-Germain-des-Prés
- 1982 : La Balance
- 1986 : Half Moon Street
- 1988 : Masquerade
- 1992 : L'Atlantide
- 1994 : Parfum de meurtre (TV Canal+)
- 1995 : Femme de passions (TV Canal+ et TF1)
- 1997 : Maître Da Costa (France 2 series) (episode:"Le Doigt de Dieu") with Roger Hanin, based on a Frédéric Dard's novel
- 1998 : The Climb (UNICEF Best Film award at the Berlin Festival)
- 2004 : Nos amis les flics
- 2006 : Lumières noires (medium-length documentary)

== Scriptwriter and director ==
- 1971 : L'Autoportrait d'un pornographe (written with Roland Topor)
- 1972 : Vive les Jacques
- 1977 : La Nuit de Saint-Germain-des-Prés (written with Robert Réa)
- 1982 : La Balance
- 1986 : Half Moon Street
- 1992 : L'Atlantide
- 2004 : Nos amis les flics (written with M. Fabiani) (Saint-Malo Film Festival Grand Prix)
- 2007 : Lumières noires (written with Sebastian Danchin) (France 2 documentary)
- 2007 : La France Made in USA (written with Sebastian Danchin) (ARTE documentary)

== Actor ==
- 1986 : Spies Like Us by John Landis - Special Force Commander
- 1990 : Rainbow Drive, TV film by Bobby Roth - Pablo
- 1994 : Parfum de meurtre, TV film by Bob Swaim - Photographer
- 1996 : J'ai deux amours, TV film by Caroline Huppert - Bob
- 1997 : Viens jouer dans la cour des grands, TV film by Caroline Huppert - Foster
- 1998 : A Soldier's Daughter Never Cries by James Ivory - Bob Smith
- 2006 : Olé ! by Florence Quentin - English Businessman

== Producer ==
- 1991 : Police Secrets TV series (France 3)

Episodes (associate producer and series director):

1. L’Enveloppe
2. Neige dans le Midi
3. Le violeur impuni
4. L’Arnaque
5. Un alibi en or
6. Un flic pourri
7. Le Vin qui Tue
8. La Bavure

== Video clips ==
- Johnny Hallyday, song Casualty of love and Mon p'tit loup
- Doc Gyneco, song C'est beau la vie, duet with Bernard Tapie
