= Mosquito Coast (disambiguation) =

The Mosquito Coast is a coastline along present-day Honduras and Nicaragua.

Mosquito Coast may also refer to:

- The Mosquito Coast (novel), a 1981 novel by Paul Theroux
- The Mosquito Coast (film), a 1986 movie based on the novel
- The Mosquito Coast (TV series), a 2021 television series based on the novel
