= Chinese Box =

1997 US romantic drama film by Wayne Wang

- DVD cover
- Directed by: Wayne Wang
- Written by: Jean-Claude Carrière; Larry Gross; Paul Theroux; Wayne Wang
- Produced by: Lydia Dean Pilcher; Jean-Louis Piel; Wayne Wang
- Starring: Jeremy Irons; Gong Li; Maggie Cheung; Michael Hui; Rubén Blades
- Cinematography: Vilko Filač
- Edited by: Christopher Tellefsen
- Music by: Graeme Revell
- Distributed by: Trimark Pictures
- Release date: September 4, 1997
- Running time: 99 minutes
- Country: United States
- Languages: English; Cantonese
- Box office: $2,178,160

Chinese Box is a 1997 romantic drama film directed by Wayne Wang and starring Jeremy Irons, Gong Li, Maggie Cheung, and Michael Hui. It is set and was made at the time of Hong Kong's handover to the People's Republic of China on June 30, 1997. The film credits Paul Theroux as a source for the story, based on themes he explores in his 1997 novel Kowloon Tong. It enjoyed modest box office success in the United States.

== Plot ==
The movie unfolds through nine different stories.

First, there is John as a reporter, trying to capture interesting scenes on the streets of Hong Kong, persuading himself his work gives his life a tangible meaning.

Second, there is Vivian who is looking to find balance in life, trying to escape from the underground she once was a part of and forget about her past, but is hindered by prejudices that are deep rooted in Chinese society.

Third, there is Vivian (still), with a chance to discard most of her problems by marrying John and moving to England with him. Even though she is tempted, she knows this would mean running away from the problem and is not be a long-term solution, mostly because of their different cultural backgrounds and possibly because of some uncertainty regarding John's ex-wife and former life.

Fourth, there is Jean, who has a here-today-who-knows-where-tomorrow attitude— especially seen in Hong Kong in the late 1990s. She understands life's different hardships, and with her face somewhat disfigured, is marked more intensely than most, but also knows where to draw the line in selling herself. John tries to help her, but does so in a dishonest way, which disappoints her. According to a note in film's credits, Jean's story was inspired by a short story by the American-British author Rachel Ingalls.

Fifth, there is John and Jim, close friends who have a mutual understanding, and shared humor and sarcasm. Even though their outlook to life differs, their love for the job (journalism) creates a strong bond of friendship.

Sixth, there is Chang, a man of high position but a coward at heart. His immense wealth cannot replace what he lacks in personality, charisma and morality. He has no cares, and exists purely on pretentiousness and status. While he is ashamed of Vivian, he does love her, but in a pathetic, cowardly way. He is very much into 'saving face' and can not find equilibrium in life (professional nor personal). He agrees to marry Vivian, but deceives her by arranging a mock wedding photoshoot, so she could have some pictures to send to her family. Vivian burns all of the photos and accepts that she will never be happy nor free.

Seventh, there are John and Vivian. A story of true love that isn't meant to be. Not because they don't want it to, but because of the societal constraints.

Eighth, there is John (again), perplexed with his own mortality, which he is suddenly forced to face.

Ninth, there is the political aspect of Hong Kong becoming a part of China again, which (at the time) was a great uncertainty.

== Cast ==
- Jeremy Irons - John Spencer
- Gong Li - Vivian
- Maggie Cheung - Jean
- Michael Hui - Chang
- Rubén Blades - Jim
- Jared Harris - William
- Chaplin Chang - Homeless Man
- Noel Rands - John's Friend at New Year's Party
- Emma Lucia - Amanda Everheart
- Ken Bennett - Rick
- Russell Cawthorne - New Year's Party MC
- Emotion Cheung - William Wong
- Harvey Stockwin - Weeks
- Jonathan Midgley - Jonathan
- Bruce Walker - Bruce
- Angelica Lofgren - Baby-Lin
- Dr. Julian Chang - Dr. Chang
- Jian Rui Chao - Businessman #1
- Wai Sing Chau - Businessman #2
- Hung Lo - Businessman #3
- Shirley Hung - Girlfriend #1
- Michelle Yeung - Girlfriend #2
- Alex Ng - Drunk karaoke singer
- Chiu Wah Lee - Minibus passenger
- Maria Cordero - Mamasan
- Pao Fong - Godfather
- Hui Fan - Godfather's wife
- Lam Man Cheung - Wedding photographer
- Lee Siu-kei - Gangster #1
- Leung Chi On - Gangster #2
- Tse Yuen Fat - Gangster #3
- Roderick Lee - Manhattan Club bouncer
- Hui Li - Black Moon hostess
- Maria St. Lynne - Black Moon hostess
- Josie Ho - Lilly

== Production ==
The movie shows the actual temporary press room which was set up for the press coverage of the handover, and located in the old part of the Convention and Exhibition Centre.

Certain scenes were shot at the Main Bar of the Foreign Correspondents' Club.

The main characters residence in the film was shot in a flat located along Central–Mid-Levels escalators, just below Hollywood Road in Central.

== Reception ==
On the review aggregator website Rotten Tomatoes, 67% of 21 critics' reviews are positive, with an average rating of 6.5/10.

== See also ==
- List of films set in Hong Kong
- M. Butterfly
