= Figures in a Landscape: People and Places =

2018 book by Paul Theroux

Figures In a Landscape
- Cover, 1st edition, US
- Author: Paul Theroux
- Language: English
- Subject: Collection of essays
- Publisher: Houghton Mifflin Harcourt
- Publication date: May 8, 2018
- Publication place: United States
- Media type: Print, hardback
- Pages: 386
- ISBN: 978-0-544-87030-7

Figures in a Landscape, subtitled: People and Places; Essays: 2001-2016, is a collection of thirty essays, profiles, articles and book introductions all by Paul Theroux. The thirty pieces cover a wide variety of topics including authors, artists, celebrities, Africa, travel experiences, reading and the craft of writing.

This 2018 volume is a companion to earlier published collections of Theroux's essays and articles including Sunrise with Seamonsters (1985) and Fresh Air Fiend (2000).

== Contents ==
| # | Title | Topic(s) | Previously appeared |
|---|---|---|---|
| 1 | My Drug Tour: Searching for Ayahuasca | Trip to Ecuador in search of a psychoactive plant | as "Honey, the Shaman Shrunk My Head", Men's Journal |
| 2 | Thoreau in the Wilderness | Henry David Thoreau, author | Introduction to The Maine Woods (Princeton University Press) |
| 3 | Liz in Neverland | Elizabeth Taylor and Michael Jackson, celebrities and close friends | Talk magazine (defunct) |
| 4 | Greeneland | Graham Greene, author | New York Times and introductions to the Penguin editions of Greene's Journey Without Maps and The Comedians |
| 5 | Hunter in the Kingdom of Fear | Hunter S. Thompson, author and gonzo journalist | The Guardian, newspaper |
| 6 | Conrad at Sea | Joseph Conrad, author | Introduction to Typhoon and Other Tales (Folio Society) |
| 7 | Simenon's World | Georges Simenon, author | Introduction to The Widow (New York Review Books Classics) |
| 8 | Dr. Sacks, the Healer | Oliver Sacks, neurologist, naturalist and author | as "My Friend the Doctor", Prospect (February 20, 1999) |
| 9 | Nurse Wolf, the Hurter | A professional dominatrix in New York | The New Yorker (June 7, 1998) |
| 10 | Robin Williams: "Who’s He When He’s at Home?" | Robin Williams, comedian and actor | Talk magazine |
| 11 | Tea with Muriel Spark | Muriel Spark, Scottish author | Talk magazine |
| 12 | Mrs. Robinson Revisited | Older women, younger men | Harper's Bazaar (March, 2002) |
| 13 | Talismans for Our Dreams | Collecting objects in travels | Departures (March 30, 2010) |
| 14 | The Rock Star's Burden | Bono, Africa, charity & harm done | New York Times (December 15, 2005) |
| 15 | Living with Geese | Raising geese, anthropomorphism and E.B. White | Smithsonian (December 2006) |
| 16 | Trespassing in Africa | A harrowing experience of Theroux as a young man in Africa | Granta |
| 17 | The Seizures in Zimbabwe | Zimbabwe commercial farmers chased from their farms by local gangs and politicians | Epilogue to the paperback edition of Dark Star Safari |
| 18 | Stanley: The Ultimate African Explorer | Review of biography of Henry Morton Stanley by Tim Jeal | New York Times book review (September 30, 2007) |
| 19 | Paul Bowles: Not a Tourist | Paul Bowles | Introduction to The Sheltering Sky (Penguin) |
| 20 | Maugham: Up and Down in Asia | W. Somerset Maugham | Introduction to The Gentleman in the Parlour (Vintage Classics) |
| 21 | English Hours: Nothing Personal | Memories as an expatriate living in England in 1970s and ‘80s | Granta #114 (February 10, 2011) |
| 22 | Traveling Beyond Google | Traveling to places despite receiving warnings to stay away | as "Why We Travel", New York Times (April 1, 2011) |
| 23 | Hawaii: Islands upon Islands | Hawaii; reflections on the author's adopted home of 22 years | as "One Man's Islands", Smithsonian magazine (May 2012) |
| 24 | Mockingbird in Monroeville | A visit to the Monroeville Alabama home town of Harper Lee, the author of To Kill a Mockingbird | as "Return of the Mockingbird" in Smithsonian magazine (July 2015) |
| 25 | Benton's America | Thomas Hart Benton and his work America Today | Smithsonian magazine (December 2014) |
| 26 | My Life as a Reader | Author's reading passions | Introduction to On Reading, photographs by Steve McCurry (Phaidon) |
| 27 | The Real Me: A Memory | A harrowing experience of Theroux as a college student | n/a |
| 28 | Life and the Magazine | Life magazine and meeting Gardner McKay | New York Times Magazine |
| 29 | Dear Old Dad: Memories of My Father | The author's father | Granta #98 (July 2, 2007) |
| 30 | The Trouble with Autobiography | The genre of autobiography | Smithsonian magazine (January 2011) |

== Reception ==
In the Irish Times Dervla Murphy found favor with "a superb set of musings on Graham Greene’s life and works."

In the New York Times Tom Zoellner said "What emerges [instead] is a portrait of an optimist with curiosity and affection for humanity in all its forms, as well as a ravenous appetite for the literary efforts of others."

Kirkus Review called it "A masterfully simple and satisfying collection."

In the Guardian Robert McCrum said "There are several highly entertaining essays here, and some quotably arresting lines, but the voice is elusive, unfixed and dissonant – an echo of the divisions within."
