= Cape to Cairo =

Cape to Cairo may refer to:

- Cape to Cairo Railway
- Cape to Cairo Red Line, the 19th century concept of a British-dominated Africa, promoted by Cecil Rhodes
- Cape to Cairo Road

== See also ==
- Dark Star Safari: Overland from Cairo to Cape Town, a book by Paul Theroux
- The Rhodes Colossus
