= André Mangeot (writer) =

British poet and short story writer

André Mangeot is a British poet, short story writer and novelist.

His publications to date include three collections of poetry and two books of short stories, with additional work in leading journals such as The Spectator, New Statesman andTimes Literary Supplement. For ten years he was a member of a poetry performance group, The Joy of Six, that appeared at many UK festivals. He has also completed three novels, as yet unpublished.

Mangeot travelled widely in his thirties and forties, reflected in his subsequent fiction, and has cited Graham Greene, Paul Theroux and John le Carré as influences.

Of French origin (his paternal grandfather a celebrated violinist of the same name) he was born in Gloucestershire and raised in Kent, Yorkshire and Suffolk before attending Oxford University. He now lives in Cambridge, and has worked for many years in charity fundraising alongside his writing.

== Bibliography ==
=== Poetry collections ===
- Natural Causes (2003)
- Mixer (2005)
- Blood Rain (2020)

=== Short story collections ===
- A Little Javanese (2008)
- True North (2010)
