= Blinded by the Light (disambiguation) =

"Blinded by the Light" is a song by Bruce Springsteen.

Blinded by the Light can also refer to:

- Blinded by the Light (1980 film), a 1980 American film
- Blinded by the Light (2019 film), a 2019 British film
- Blinded by the Light (Dexter), an episode of the American television series Dexter
- Blinded by the Lights, a song by Mike Skinner
- Blinded by the Lights (TV series), a Polish TV series

== See also ==
- Blinding Light, a novel by Paul Theroux
- Blinding Lights, a song by the Weeknd
