= Saint Jack (film) =

1979 film by Peter Bogdanovich

- Directed by: Peter Bogdanovich
- Screenplay by: Howard Sackler; Paul Theroux; Peter Bogdanovich
- Based on: Saint Jack by Paul Theroux
- Produced by: Roger Corman
- Starring: Ben Gazzara; Denholm Elliott; Joss Ackland; James Villiers; Rodney Bewes; Mark Kingston; George Lazenby
- Cinematography: Robby Müller
- Edited by: William C. Carruth
- Production companies: Playboy Productions; Shoals Creek; Copa de Oro
- Distributed by: New World Pictures
- Release date: April 27, 1979
- Running time: 112 minutes
- Country: United States
- Language: English
- Budget: $2 million
- Box office: less than $1 million (US/Canada rentals) $3 million (foreign)

Saint Jack is a 1979 American drama film directed by Peter Bogdanovich and based on the 1973 novel Saint Jack. Ben Gazzara stars as Jack Flowers in the film alongside Denholm Elliott and Lisa Lu.

The movie is notable for being the first to include a gay sub-plot involving a Singaporean character.

== Plot ==
The film follows the life of Jack Flowers, an affable and independent-minded American pimp operating in Singapore during the 1970s. Jack makes his living managing prostitutes while maintaining an appearance of legitimacy by claiming to work for a local Chinese businessman. He is well-integrated into the expatriate underworld and adept at navigating the city's complex social and criminal landscapes. The plot begins with Jack picking up William Leigh, a reserved British accountant from the airport, ostensibly on behalf of his 'boss'. Jack introduces William to the nightlife of Singapore, taking him first to a hotel and then to a bar popular among British expatriates. They eventually accompany a client to a brothel, though William expresses little interest and prefers a quiet game of squash. Their evening ends in a tense encounter when they are pursued by members of a Chinese triad who are hostile to Jack's unauthorized operations. The following day, one of Jack's local friends is found murdered, sending a clear warning from the syndicate.

As the narrative develops, Jack is portrayed as a man of principle despite his profession, forming genuine relationships with locals in contrast to the often cynical or hedonistic attitudes of other expatriates. William's quiet and orderly temperament, along with his desire to retire peacefully in the English countryside, provides a counterpoint to Jack's chaotic existence. The contrast between the two men leads Jack to reflect on his own circumstances. The film reaches its climax when Jack is approached by American agents who attempt to coerce him into helping blackmail a visiting United States senator. Jack's decision in the face of this moral dilemma serves as the film's critical turning point, revealing the depth of his character and underscoring the broader themes of integrity, identity, and displacement.

== Cast ==
- Ben Gazzara as Jack Flowers
- Denholm Elliott as William Leigh
- James Villiers as Frogget
- Joss Ackland as Yardley
- Rodney Bewes as Smale
- Mark Kingston as Mr. Yates
- Lisa Lu as Mrs. Yates
- Monika Subramaniam as Monika
- Judy Lim as Judy
- George Lazenby as Senator
- Peter Bogdanovich as Eddie Schuman
- Joseph Noël as Gopi

== Film adaptation rights ==
Cybill Shepherd sued Playboy magazine after they published photos of her from The Last Picture Show. As part of the settlement, she got the rights to the novel Saint Jack, which she had wanted to make into a film ever since Orson Welles gave her a copy.

== Production ==
Saint Jack was filmed entirely on location in Singapore over the course of May and June 1978. The production captured a range of city landmarks, including the former Empress Place, a hawker centre, Bugis Street, and the former Singapore International Airport, which was repurposed as a military airbase after the opening of Changi Airport in 1981. Due to the controversial nature of the original novel and the conservative social climate of Singapore in the late 1970s, the filmmakers avoided revealing the true nature of the project to local authorities. To obtain filming permits, they submitted a false synopsis for a fictitious romance film titled Jack of Hearts, which Bogdanovich described as "a cross between Love Is a Many Splendored Thing and Pal Joey." Most Singaporeans involved in the production believed this fabricated narrative and were unaware of the film's actual plot during shooting.

The film is notable for being the first feature to depict a gay sub-plot involving a Singaporean character, including scenes with full-frontal male nudity, as well as the first to feature a nude scene with a Singaporean trans woman. Among the cast was Australian actor George Lazenby, known internationally for portraying James Bond in On Her Majesty's Secret Service. His involvement marked one of his few prestige roles outside the Bond franchise. In 2006, Singapore-based writer Ben Slater published Kinda Hot: The Making of Saint Jack, a detailed account of the film's production. Slater traced and interviewed members of the original cast and crew, providing insights into how the controversial project came to be made in Singapore.

== Analysis ==
Kenneth Chan observes that the film focuses on representing the "dark undercurrents" of Singapore, such as the red-light district and acts of prostitution. This subject matter would later make its way into other early queer Singaporean films such as Bugis Street (1995), Untitled (2005), and Pleasure Factory (2007), as it "unwitting[ly]...establish[ed]...thematic trends...that queer cinematic representations in the 1990s and 2000s would continue to build on."

Other writers, like Raphaël Millet as well as Jan Uhde and Yvonne Ng Uhde, have analysed the "documentary" importance of Saint Jack in terms of how it captures the landscape of the city during the 1970s.

== Release ==
As expected, Saint Jack was banned in both Singapore and Malaysia shortly after its release on January 17, 1980. In Singapore, the ban was imposed "largely due to concerns that there would be excessive edits required to the scenes of nudity and some coarse language before it could be shown to a general audience" as well as the inclusion of LGBT-related content. Malaysian authorities also barred the film from distribution, in line with similarly conservative attitudes at the time. However, Saint Jack received a one-time, limited screening in Singapore during the 1997 Singapore International Film Festival.

In March 2006, the Infocomm Media Development Authority (IMDA) fully lifted the ban in Singapore, classifying the film with an M18 rating. The film remains banned in Malaysia. Saint Jack was re-released in North America on DVD in 2001. In the decades after the film's release, it gained more appreciation in Singapore. In 2019, it was screened there as part of Singaporeana!, a curated retrospective by the Asian Film Archive celebrating rarely seen films with local cultural significance.

=== Box office ===
The film was a box office bomb in the United States and Canada, earning less than $1 million. It performed better outside those countries however, with a gross of $3 million.

== Critical reception ==
Filmink argued "A trashier version of this story – one directed by, say, Steve Carver... probably would have been more lucrative. I’ve never read Corman admitting that in an interview, but I bet he felt it."

On the review aggregator website Rotten Tomatoes, 72% of 18 critics' reviews are positive, with an average rating of 6.4/10. Metacritic, which uses a weighted average, assigned the film a score of 57 out of 100, based on 7 critics, indicating "mixed or average" reviews.

Roger Ebert gave the film a four-star review. In praise of Gazzara's performance, he writes: "sometimes a character in a movie inhabits his world so freely, so easily, that he creates it for us as well. Ben Gazzara does that in Saint Jack." He goes on to say: "The film is by Peter Bogdanovich and what a revelation it is, coming after three expensive flops. But here everything is right again. Everything." Stanley Kauffmann of The New Republic described Saint Jack as "otiose and odious". Filmink magazine called it "a great hangout movie. It just works. A peak for Ben Gazzara."
