= The Pillars of Hercules (book) =

1995 travelogue by Paul Theroux

First edition (publ. Putnam)

The Pillars of Hercules: A Grand Tour of the Mediterranean is a travelogue written by the American travel writer and novelist Paul Theroux, first published 1995.

It concerns a year-and-a-half long expedition around the shoreline of the Mediterranean Sea, from one of Hercules' Pillars (Gibraltar) to the other (Ceuta) undertaken during 1993–94. Theroux recounts his experiences from the many diverse countries and regions that border the shores of the sea, including the war-torn Yugoslavia (this was shortly before the break-up of the former republic), the troubled Levant and the recently liberated Albania. Other countries visited include Spain (including Palma de Mallorca), France (including Corsica), Italy (including Sardinia), Slovenia, Croatia, Greece, Turkey, Syria, Egypt, Tunisia, and Morocco. Many authors, politicians, topics, and works are mentioned within the work including: Joshua Hassan, bullfighting, Francisco Franco, tourism, Salvador Dalí, Edward Lear, the Bible, the Odyssey, James Joyce (in Trieste), Silvio Berlusconi, Carlo Levi, pornography, the evil eye, the Croatian War of Independence, the Stari Most, bunkers, Ismail Kadare, Enver Hoxha, cruise ship culture with people from the West, cruise ship culture with people from Turkey, border crossings, Lawrence Durrell (Alexandria Quartet), Christopher W.S. Ross, Abdul Rahman Munif, American-Israeli relations, Israeli-Palestinian relations, Naguib Mahfouz, and Paul Bowles.

The Pillars of Hercules consists of eighteen chapters.
