= The Family Arsenal =

1976 novel by Paul Theroux

- First edition
- Author: Paul Theroux
- Cover artist: Paul Bacon
- Language: English
- Genre: Thriller
- Publisher: Houghton Mifflin Company
- Publication date: 1976
- Publication place: United States
- Pages: 309
- ISBN: 0-395-24400-5

The Family Arsenal is a novel by Paul Theroux originally published in 1976. It is a political thriller following the acts of a terrorist cell in London.

== Synopsis ==
The Family Arsenal follows a bitter former American Consul as he blunders into a terrorist commune in search of a cause; seemingly any cause so long as it offers some way of battling evil, which here takes the guise of a heavy-handed government and a gun-running criminal.

Shortly after Valentine Hood joins a terrorist cell operating from a nondescript house in a once pleasant street in Deptford, South London, he commits a senselessly quixotic killing. The repercussions from this unsanctioned act ripple far and wide, eventually endangering everything and everyone he has been fighting for. Gradually Hood insinuates himself into the confidences of the suspicious, down-trodden members of his new family as they plan and execute equally pointless atrocities around London, either alone or with the assistance of a bored society hostess, an up-and-coming actress and a man who may or may not allow access to the IRA.
