= O-Zone (novel) =

1986 novel by Paul Theroux

First edition (publ. Putman)

O-zone is a science fiction novel by the American author Paul Theroux published in 1986.

== Synopsis ==
Missouri is a nuclear wasteland after leakage of stored radioactive waste, off limits to all but the very rich. Eight of them, referred to as 'Owners', visit this O-Zone as their personal playground. Some of them come to the disturbing realizations that the life-forms outside of their walled in cities, assumed to be just 'things', seem as human as the Owners themselves.
