= My Secret History =

1989 novel by Paul Theroux

- First US edition
- Author: Paul Theroux
- Language: English
- Publisher: Putnam Adult (US); Hamish Hamilton (UK)
- Publication date: June 1989
- Publication place: United States
- Media type: Print
- Pages: 511 (US) 480 (UK)
- ISBN: 0-399-13424-7

My Secret History is a novel by Paul Theroux published in June 1989 by Putnam Adult in the US and Hamish Hamilton in the UK.

The novel follows the life of Andre (Andy) Parent as he "grows" through his life and the person he becomes through his experiences, experiences that have been said by some to be extremely autobiographical, but the author himself states in the book that only some of the events in the book are relevant to his own life, without telling us which bits these are.

== Plot ==
=== Altar Boy [1956] ===
The first chapter is set in the Boston suburb of Medford (Theroux's birthplace) where 15-year-old Andy acts as altar boy at the local Catholic church. He frequently totes his .22 Mossberg rifle to church on his way to the Sandpits - an improvised shooting range complete with glass bottles - for the purpose of impressing his neighbor Tina Spector. He befriends a newly-arrived alcoholic Father Furty, whose easygoing and genial demeanor unburdens Andy in confessional and on boat trips with the Ladies of the Sodality in Father Furty's boat in Boston Harbor. Andy obtains a job attending the locker room at Wright's pond. Throughout the chapter, Andy reads through Dante's Inferno, and his opinion of the other characters is often a reflection of how they respond to this activity. Father Furty is quoted while on his boat saying, "I've seen plenty of bad, but I've never seen evil...Bad yes, evil no. And I'm from New Jersey!" He later repeats a shorter version of this to Andy and winks as Andy walks by. Father Furty's friendship and interest in Andy cultivates Andy's interest in the faith. After Father Furty's death, an interview with the Pastor, who largely viewed Father Furty as weak and in need of prayer for salvation, leads Andy to lose interest in the faith. At the end of the chapter, it's assumed that Andy and Tina have sex.

=== Whale Steaks [1960] ===
The chapter starts at the beginning of Summer after Andy's freshman year of college in Amherst. Andy finished Moby Dick at some point during the past year and is fixated with finding a whale steak to eat. Whilst reading Baudelaire, he negotiates for a job as a lifeguard at an Armenian Country Club - the Maldwyn Country Club - that he describes as exclusive and English, with an overbearing and ignorant Sicilian boss - Mattanza. He grows to dislike Mattanza's surveillance, the barring of reading at work, and the barring of talking with guests unless spoken to first. When he does interact with guests he finds they mostly talk about the powerful people they know. Mattanza reminisces with Andy about his former exploits with women across town, and makes a claim that women enjoy being roughed up. Andy discovers that Mattanza's wife will only have sexual relations with Mattanza when not pregnant, which is not often. While working at the country club, Andy receives attention from a rich fifty-year-old woman - Mrs. Mamalujian. Andy attempts to impress Mamalujian with his knowledge of books. After Mamalujian provides Andy The Henry Miller Reader as a gift, Mattanza confronts Andy about the gift and Andy is fired the next day. On the way out, Andy sabotages all the vehicles in the parking lot (except for Mamalujian's) by placing potatoes from the kitchen into the tailpipes.

The next day Andy applies for a job at the municipal pool - the MCD pool - where he works with two other lifeguards his age, Larry McGinnis and Vinny Muzzaroll. The new pool is lively and accepts a wide assortment of guests. Larry describes the pool to Andy by saying that at the end of every day he expects to find a body at the bottom. Andy receives better pay, shorter hours, and is allowed to read on the job. A girl named Lucy approaches him at the pool carrying On the Road and the two begin a mostly sexual relationship. Lucy is a 21 year-old Boston University student who rents a one bedroom space from a deaf landlady nearby. Andy begins reading Ezra Pound and many female authors during this period. Mamalujian starts to visit him at the pool, and takes him out to eat while he talks about his books. Mamalujian and Lucy do not know about each other. Mamalujian invites Andy to a restaurant in a hotel, but they enter a room and order meals and drinks. After showering and without becoming intimate, Mamalujian leaves and tells Andy the room is reserved for the night. Andy invites Lucy and the two spend the night together. Other gifts Mamalujian provides to Andy are used by Andy to impress Lucy. During one visit to a restaurant with Mamalujian, Andy enjoys his first whale steak. He has difficulty enjoying his steak because Mamalujian reveals that she's leaving her husband. Lucy reveals that she is pregnant, and becomes upset when she learns that Andy is only 19 years-old.

During a weekend trip to New York City with Mamalujian to see Broadway shows, Andy spends most of his time searching for an abortion doctor for Lucy. Andy sleeps with his clothes on in a separate bed. News of Kennedy's presidential campaign fills the airwaves and Andy describes Kennedy as a bad Catholic and a rich man that he dislikes. During the day, he searches bars and visits a doctor whose name Mamalujian mentions when he tells her that he's asking about abortion services for a friend. He is unable to find a doctor in New York. He accompanies Lucy on a visit to see her mother, to whom they do not mention the pregnancy. Lucy ridicules Andy as a child when he departs for the night and sleeps on the beach for lack of lodging. Andy resumes reading Boudelaire. Andy borrows $300 from Mamalujian and gives it to Lucy. Near Labor Day, the last day that the pool is open for the season, Mamalujian confronts Andy at the pool and brings him to a bar, telling Andy that he deceived her and that he can't leave her because of the $300 debt. Andy immediately leaves the bar and borrows money from Larry and Mattanza and donates blood nearby to reimburse Mamalujian within a half-hour. Andy visits with Lucy one last time before they both go back to college. Andy notices that Lucy is no longer pregnant, and she describes how she found a man to perform her abortion. Lucy met the man in a bar, who, after getting drunk, took her at dusk to a rundown shed. There, the man raped her and afterword used a metal tool from his bag to abort the unborn child. Lucy facetiously tells Andy he will be successful in his future endeavors. Andy dreams of escaping his failures.

=== African Girls [1964] ===
The chapter opens at the isolated Chamba Hill Secondary School outside of Zimba at the beginning of a largely governmentless 6-month transition of power from the British Protectorate as Nyasaland in the Federation of Rhodesia and Nyasaland to the independent country Malawi. Andy, now with the Peace Corps, is the headmaster of the school and must decide how to punish a student who is caught smoking marijuana out near the gum trees. Deputy Mambo, who caught the boy, and Miss Natwick, a white part-time needlework instructor from Rhodesia who believes she should be headmaster, both advocate for what Andy considers to be the British form of punishment - corporal punishment. The student mentions Andy's dancing with African girls, and to keep the student quiet and avoid doling out corporal punishment, Andy sentences the boy to make 20 clay bricks - the school needs a new chimbuzi - latrine. Mr. Likoni, the former British headmaster, departed after the December 31, 1963 dissolution of Nyasaland like many of the British in Nyasaland.

We discover that Andy learned the local language Chinyanja at Syracuse University sometime before arriving in Africa. He enjoys conversing with the students and is well-liked in return. The students are well behaved and Andy fears the latrine will not be built. Before Andy became headmaster at the school, he built the road connecting the school to the lower road; after being told the Public Works Department was in stasis because of the government change, and with an allowance of 100 pounds, he first attempted hiring laborers, but they dozed off and asked for a higher rate on the first day. He exchanged his remaining amount of pounds for bags of tickeys, which he flung along the route of the road to the desired width. The students scavenged for the money and the road was created. Andy rides his bicycle through a pine forest planted by the Forestry Commission to travel between Zimpa and the school.

Andy describes his separate weekend life, where on Friday, Saturday, and Sunday nights he takes home a different African girl from the local bar - the Beautiful Bamboo Bar. After the British left, many of the shops in town are disused. The Nyasaland Trading Company sells British items Africans do not buy. The bar plays rock and roll music and the girls enjoy Andy's company. The girls never ask for money and Andy is pleased that the sex comes with no strings attached. Andy reveals that the girls are not considered suitable for marriage to Africans because they have shamed themselves in various ways. The girls live behind the bar, but are not paid to work there. Andy lives in Mr. Likoni's old residence and uses Mr. Likoni's previous cook - Captain, who is a Muslim and a former member of the King's African Rifles - as his own cook. Andy buys powder to kill body lice.

Ed Wently, a Peace Corps supervisor, arrives with a transfer from Sierra Leone, Ward Rockwell. Rockwell moves in with Andre and is tasked with teaching math and building the latrine for the school. Rockwell's frequent talk of and enthusiasm for hygiene and building the latrine annoys Andy, who considers Rockwell's most annoying characteristic as always being partly correct in his statements. Andy moves to a new two-room residence in a run down settlement of about 100 sheds called Kanjedza with Captain. Andy carries a stick for the dogs who only bark at whites. Andy discusses America with his new neighbor Harry Gombo, and when Harry claims that Americans have everything, Andy counters that Americans are starved for sex compared to Africans. Harry states that sex is like eating. Rockwell continues building his Alamo-inspired latrine. Andy continues having sex on weekends with girls from the bar and contracts gonorrhea.

Andy avoids the Peace Corps doctor and is instead prescribed free antibiotics from Mr. Nunka - a medical assistant - from the local hospital in Zimba. The infection leaves in a week and in return, Andy volunteers at the hospital for a few weekends to bathe several sick old men in the ward. Andy recognizes a bar girl, Gloria, who receives antibiotics at the hospital and begins exclusively seeing her for a period. He visits her village and during the visit is displeased with her behavior around her family. After returning, they go about their business as before.

Nearing the inauguration of Malawi, Deputy Mambo, who now sports a Youth League badge with an image of Hastings Kamuzu Banda, brings two Israeli soldiers to the school to drill the children for opening ceremonies. Deputy Mambo wants the students to sing "Everything Belongs" - a song describing how everything in the country belongs to Kamuzu Bundu. Andy asks Wently what to do and Wently tells Andy to play ball. Deputy Mambo is named the new headmaster and Mr. Likoni is the new Education Minister. Andy goes to the bar on inauguration day and the African girl he takes home asks him to pay for sex.

=== Bush Baby [1968] ===
Andy arrives in London to visit his writer friend S. Prasad (resembling V.S. Naipaul in description) for a Christmas vacation away from his job as acting director at the Adult Studies Institute in Kampala, Uganda. Andy met Prasad during Prasad's travels in Africa. While at Prasad's house, Andy receives a letter written in Italian from a female friend in Accra and decides to stop by before returning to Uganda. During a trip to Prasad's publisher, while Prasad is detained for paperwork, Andy encounters a blonde woman named Rosamond who he convinces to meet later for a drink. Although making plans to visit museums, Andy and Rosamond mostly spend their nights at her place, with Andy returning in the early morning to Prasad's house while Prasad lounges restlessly in his office from insomnia. During the day, Prasad and Andy take walks, experience a séance, and tour museums. Prasad's wife Sarah fusses over them before they go out. After Andy suggests the idea of marriage to Rosamond, they visit her family on Christmas day. After her family criticizes Andy's quiet behavior and what they perceive to be American attacks on the British legacy in Africa in their oblique English way, Rosamond apologizes for her family's behavior. Later, with Sarah looking on, Prasad advises Andy not to pay attention to those people, that they are only a danger to themselves, and not to see Rosamond again. Andy does not see Rosamond again. Prasad encourages Andy in his writing career.

Andy arrives in what he describes as a crumbling Accra and visits Francesca. Francesca is an independent Sicilian woman who moved to Britain to learn English, and then moved to Boston where she initially met Andy on a bus. Francesca more recently moved to Accra to teach English after learning that Andy was in Africa. They are searching for beer for the New Year, but cannot find any in the city. In order to pay for his Christmas vacation, Andy requires information to write an article for U.S. media. Francesca agrees to help Andy. Francesca and Andy resume sexual relations while he is in Ghana. Francesca arranges an interview with a man named Kofi who works for the Ministry of Works. Kofi, always smiling, tells Andy that it is all bribery and corruption in Ghana. Kofi offers to arrange an interview with top ministry officials. Prior to leaving, out of a crate of beer, Kofi hands Andy two bottles to leave with over Francesca's objection. Andy and Francesca drive out to Kumasi and Andy tells Francesca that he loves her. They make love in a hotel. Andy feels the familiar itch of gonorrhea and discovers that Francesca received it from Kofi.

During his week-long recovery from gonorrhea, Andy visits Lagos in Nigeria to see a woman, Femi, that he knew from Uganda. She returned to Lagos because she was pregnant from a man in Lagos, but she tells Andy that the child was aborted, and the man wanted nothing to do with her. Femi lives with her family near the airport.

Andy returns to Kampala. His apartment is a mess from his parrot's droppings and roaches - a result of his cook's habit of leaving food in kitchen drawers. Andy thinks about the Chinese grocer and is writing a novel about him. A bush baby frequently looks in on Andy's apartment at night, hanging from the bars covering the window, but Andy will not let it in. Andy speaks Swahili with his staff at the school - which is not any of the staff's or the student's natural language. Andy is mostly restless because Christmas vacation is long in Uganda. He teaches an English for Diplomats class with students from the local embassies in Kampala. Andy sees an African Muslim woman, Rashida, casually. She works at a beauty salon and enjoys dancing. Andy tells Rashida he loves her. While Andy and Rashida sleep, an earthquake tremor wakes Andy but Rashida continues to sleep. When she teases him about his concern for the tremor, he becomes annoyed. When Andy visits Rashida later in the day, he is told she left with an Indian. Andy arrives at the Staff Club for some drinks.

The bar patrons of the Staff Club gossip. The bookkeeper, Alma, reminds Andy that he still owes money on his bar tab - she has not been friendly ever since she called out her husband's name and Andy withdrew while having sex. Another patron asks Andy where his Nubian girl, Femi, is, and Andy replies that she is not Nubian. The patrons discuss which African girls are prettiest. Alma leaves the bar and a patron, Okello, follows. Another patron, Mungai, notes that he went to Wireless Hill during Christmas break to have sex with Alma, but he could not. After the club empties, Potter and Andy head over to a "jazz" festival at an unnamed bar. There, Andy asks a pretty blonde to meet him the following day when her date goes to the bathroom.

The following day Andy meets the girl and they go to a bar. She is a 20 year-old British student studying to get her education diploma so she can teach in the bush. After their meal they drive to Wireless Hill, where Andy sees Alma in a car with Okello. Andy tells the girl that he does not want to have sex with her, but that he really likes her and hopes to have sex with her in the future. The girl's name is Jennifer. Andy and Jennifer spend more time with each other at restaurants and at the Botanical Garden. On a trip to visit Andy's school posts in the country, Andy and Jennifer have sex for the first time. They view many different animals along their route - gazelle, hippos, wildebeest, and zebras. Andy says he loves Jennifer, and Jennifer obliquely indicates she enjoys their time together.

Jennifer informs Andy that she will be teaching in Kenya. After Jennifer departs for Kenya, Andy becomes depressed and considers suicide. Andy makes an impromptu visit to see Jennifer in Kenya at her school near Nairobi and eventually proposes marriage. Andy and Jennifer marry and Jennifer becomes pregnant. Jennifer and Andy argue because Jennifer is upset that she has a degree, does not work, and sacrificed her life for Andy. On a trip through Kampala to go shopping, there is a riot, their car is destroyed, and they are saved by an Indian couple - C.D. Patel and his wife - in the Indian's house. Mr. Patel tells Andy not to mind the political balderdash. Jennifer's water breaks.

=== Leaving Siberia [1974] ===
Andy is in Siberia in Winter near Khabarovsk. The last telephone call he made home was from Hokkaido in Japan, and there was no answer. Andy is on the last leg of a rail road tour around Eurasia, and is taking notes of his observations. In the Soviet Union, he is assisted in his travels by an Intourist guide - an overweight woman named Irina - because he is a solitary traveler. Irina and Andy tour Khabarovsk in a black limousine and visit a museum and a factory. Although Irina says it is unusual, during the course of the tour of Khabarovsk, Irina arranges a telephone call to be placed to London. When Andy's call is connected later that night, Jennifer sounds remote and cold and informs Andy that it is 6 A.M. in London. Andy takes the Trans-Siberian railroad straight through to Moscow and then makes his way back home to Catford.

Andy reunites with Jennifer and his young son Jack after 4½ months. Andy enjoys settling into a domestic routine; while his wife works at Drummonds Bank as a supervisor, Andy cares for Jack, performs house chores, and prepares most of the meals. Andy indicates that Jennifer's idea of freedom is a job, which suits Andy in his writing endeavors. Jennifer reveals that when Andy left for his continental trip, she felt awful and pretended that he had died. Andy makes little headway on the book he was contracted to write about his tour, the first draft of which is due in the Spring. Andy notices that the portable heater in his study is missing. While at Crystal Palace Park with Jack, Jack reveals to Andy that Jennifer's male friend recently showed Jack the dinosaur exhibit. Andy hides his suspicions from Jack.

As Andy recalls his phone call to Jennifer from Siberia, his new secret drives his daily energy. Andy reads all of Jennifer's notes and combs through her personal belongings, but finds nothing suspicious. After returning from an evening out, Andy checks Jennifer's bag and finds a note from a lover without a name. Andy confronts Jennifer and she replies that the affair is over and she does not want to talk about it. An argument erupts and settles.

Andy continually asks Jennifer for the identity of her lover in the following days. Andy describes a primal jealousy and a more abstract anger - deriving from the danger experienced during his tour across Eurasia and his reassurance of returning to a family - that drives his mission to discover Jennifer's lover. Jennifer reassures Andy that it is over. Andy and Jennifer argue in front of Jack. The postman shows Andy how to open letters inconspicuously, which he uses to screen Jennifer's mail. Andy follows Jennifer to work and profiles the other men at Drummonds - going so far as to follow the only male associate in his thirties. After accusing Jennifer of sleeping with the young associate, Jennifer reveals it is another - Terry Slee, an older divorced man who is an assistant manager at Drummonds. This news devastates Andy.

Andy repeatedly telephones Slee but does not indicate who is calling. Andy dreams of ways to torture Slee, including hanging Slee's cat. On a Friday evening, Andy calls Slee's residence and a cleaning lady informs Andy that Slee is out for the weekend. Andy learns from Jennifer the location of one of her other colleague's house in the country, in a development called Sevenoaks. Andy spends Saturday hiding in Sevenoaks until night falls. Andy tricks the maid to enter the bank colleague's house and interrupts a dinner party with Slee in attendance. In front of senior bank staff, Andy forces Slee to eat the love letter Slee wrote to Jennifer and squirts a water gun filled with Andy's urine at Slee.

On Monday morning, Andy informs Jennifer of a censored version of the Saturday incident. After Jennifer returns home from work, Andy spends the next several weeks sleeping in his study. Andy skims his travel notes and laughs when reading a dialogue from an Indian train. Andy gathers new energy to work on his book. It is difficult for Andy to work while Jennifer is home, and they discuss the weather. In the Summer, Andy finishes his book, visits Jennifer at work, and the two go on a picnic during lunch to reconcile. Andy looks forward to the prospect of visiting the United States with Jennifer and Jack.

=== Two of Everything [1984] ===
Andy arrives in Boston and reopens his second house there. Andy alternates his time between Clapham with Jennifer and Jack and Boston with his girlfriend Eden. Andy mentions he has two of everything. Eden visits Andy at the house after Andy settles in. Eden is an insecure thirty-something former dancer turned magazine editor that specializes in antiques and decoration and who enjoys preparing gourmet cooking. Eden knows Andy is married. Eden often acts childish and Andy remarks this is a trait often seen in people without children or who do not wish to have children. Eden makes love to Andy never fully naked - stockings, a ribbon, etc. - explaining that she feels more naked that way.

Andy and Eden travel to India for an article Andy is writing to revisit places from 10 years prior. Andy notes that a trait common with antique lovers and gourmets is that they are usually anglophiles who are class-conscious, and that no matter where they are from in the United States they always include themselves in the English upper-middle class. Eden fusses over the food on the plane trip. Eden and Andy arrive in Delhi and begin touring the Red Fort, the Moti Mahal, the Throne Room, and the Marble Pavilion. Before long, Eden complains of dizziness and returns to the hotel. At the pool, Eden complains about the pestering locals. Andy and Eden meet with Andy's acquaintance and tour guide Indoo, who shows Eden and Andy the local antiques shops after Eden decides she does not want to do any more sightseeing. Indoo convinces Andy and Eden to go whitewater rafting on the Ganges River. The river craft is parked on the bank during their descent to examine human remains. The Indians and Andy bury the remains while Eden cannot bear to look. Andy is reminded of his funeral duties as an altar boy. Indoo tells Eden that the Indians believe the world is maya and that the secret is in letting go of things. A few days later in the hotel, Eden is wearing a human bone necklace of Tibetan origin that a local vendor gave to her. Andy and Eden make love in the hotel room with Eden wearing only the bone necklace. Eden reveals the vendor also gave her a human bone flute and a human bone drum.

Andy and Eden take the slow moving Janata Express to Agra. Andy and Eden hire a new tour guide, Unmesh, who says he knows everything. Unmesh shows them the Taj Mahal and Eden is brought to tears. Unmesh then takes them to Akbar's Mausoleum and to Fatehpur Sikri where they picnic. Andy and Eden take the Madras Express to Madras. Andy and Eden make love on the train. At Madras, their hotel room is run down and Eden is initially displeased. When Andy listens to the radio in Agra he hears an announcer describing the bear market in Europe: If you make the market your mistress you have to put up with its moods. Andy and Eden visit Andy's acquaintance Mahadeva and Mahadeva's wife and children. The group enjoy a meal together, although Mahadeva's family is more distant when Andy reveals that Eden is not his wife and they have no children. In the hotel and on the returning plane flight Eden reveals that she always cries in the shower and that she has rape fantasies, which she supposes is normal.

Eden departs to Boston and Andy takes the train in England home to Clapham. In transit, Andy notes that being alive is being alone, and that he lives in the cracks between two lives. Upon reuniting with Jennifer, Andy cooks Jennifer breakfast. Andy rides his bike to Jack's school. Jack is overwhelmed with schoolwork and Andy reminds Jack not to forget to read Conrad's The Secret Sharer. Jack asks Andy if Andy knows anything about the Avignon Papacy or if Andy speaks Russian. Andy cannot help Jack. Then Jack asks what Manichaean means, and Andy responds that the word is derived from the name of a Persian prophet named Manes and relates to seeing that good and evil are a mixture.

Andy and Jennifer leave for India on a trip almost mirroring the one Andy took with Eden. Jennifer's behavior contrasts with Eden's behavior. Jennifer is interested in sightseeing and lightly critiques Andy's knack for buying knickknacks. Jennifer excludes herself from the river rafting trip, comparing Andy to a boring scoutmaster. Instead she tours Hardwar and cries form joy when recalling all the poor but happy residents. In Agra, Andy and Jennifer visit Humayun's Tomb in addition to the Taj Mahal, the later of which did not disappoint Jennifer. Jennifer tips Unmesh against Andy's wishes. Unmesh translates a passage on a monument attributed to Issa that describes earth as a bridge on which no house shall be built. The ride on the Madras Express is hot and humid and Jennifer notes that a person could dislocate their back trying to make love in one of the berths. When Andy and Jennifer enjoy a meal with Mahadeva's family, Mahadeva's daughter mentions the other Auntie that visited with Andy. Jennifer conferences with Mahadeva's wife but says nothing. Before leaving India, Andy and Jennifer visit Indoo's golf club, and an Indian violinist tells Andy, "You hum it, I play it." Andy tells Jennifer that this is Andy's artistic approach. Jennifer tells Andy that she knows there is another woman and that Andy will have to choose.

== Themes ==
=== Manichaeism ===
Manichaeism, or the belief in the mingling of good and evil and the duality of nature, features prominently in the book. In the first chapter, Father Furty tells the Ladies of the Sodality and Andy that he has witnessed many bad things, but never evil - an indication that Father Furty believes that good and evil are difficult or impossible to find in isolation.

=== Names ===
The importance of names are examined in at least two places in the book. In the third chapter, while in Nyasaland, Andy describes the diversity and quantity of birds there. Andy notes that there is only one word for a bird in the Chinyanja language. Later, in the fourth chapter while in England, Andy describes the numerous lofty names and titles for places in London, all of which are disappointing to visit.

=== Secrets ===
The book examines the nature of secrets in every chapter. In the first chapter, Andy keeps his private life with Tina secret from his mother. In the second chapter, Andy keeps Mamalujian and Lucy from knowing about each other. In the third chapter, Andy keeps his patronage of the African girls a secret from his colleagues and students at his school. In the fourth chapter, Andy briefly examines the secret adulterous life of Alma and of others in general. In the fifth chapter, Andy becomes animated by his wife's secret affair. In the sixth chapter, Andy keeps a secret mistress, Eden, from his own wife.
