= Millroy the Magician =

1993 novel by American writer Paul Theroux

- First edition (UK)
- Author: Paul Theroux
- Cover artist: Marshall Arisman
- Language: English
- Publisher: Hamish Hamilton (UK); Random House (US)
- Publication date: Oct 1993 (UK); Feb 1994 (US)
- Publication place: United States
- Media type: Print, audio & eBook
- ISBN: 0-241-13185-5

Millroy the Magician is a novel by American writer Paul Theroux. It was published in 1993 by Hamish Hamilton in the UK and by Random House the following year in the US, where it was chosen as one of the New York Times notable books of the year. The novel has been identified as one of the best of the 1990s. It is a satire of American consumer culture and love of fast food, and contains elements of parable and magic realism.

== Plot synopsis ==
The book concerns lonely teenager Jilly Farina and her relationship with Millroy. He is performing and calls her out of the audience and tells her he will train her to be his assistant. Millroy leaves the travelling fair and together with Jilly embarks on a mission to transform the food habits of America; converting them to Bible-based vegetarianism and promising his followers that they will live to be 200. His evangelical fervour is backed up by miraculous tricks but attracts growing opposition. He goes on to create a top-rating television show and chain of 'Day One' diners staffed by young volunteers. As his public success grows Jilly becomes increasingly uncomfortable in her role as his confidante.

== Reception ==
Positive review extracts from the rear cover of the 1994 Penguin edition:

- The magic in Millroy is brilliantly done ... This is Theroux's best book for a very long time - Jonathan Raban in the TLS
- Magical ... this is Paul Theroux's best novels for some while ... the real success is Millroy himself, who acts unpredictably whenever the reader feels that he has his measure - Paul Bailey in the Daily Telegraph
- A hugely ambitious, capacious fiction that manages to be at once entertaining and unsettling - Salman Rushdie in the Independent on Sunday
- Fresh and unexpected ... this very accomplished, confident book is among his best - Philip Hensher in The Guardian
