= Masquerade (1988 film) =

1988 American romance mystery thriller film directed by Bob Swaim

- Theatrical release poster
- Directed by: Bob Swaim
- Written by: Dick Wolf; Larry Brody (uncredited)
- Produced by: Michael I. Levy
- Starring: Rob Lowe; Meg Tilly; Kim Cattrall; Doug Savant
- Cinematography: David Watkin
- Edited by: Scott Conrad
- Music by: John Barry
- Production companies: Metro-Goldwyn-Mayer; Michael I. Levy Enterprises
- Distributed by: Metro-Goldwyn-Mayer
- Release date: March 11, 1988
- Running time: 91 minutes
- Country: United States
- Language: English
- Budget: $12 million
- Box office: $15.8 million

Masquerade is a 1988 American neo-noir romantic thriller film directed by Bob Swaim and starring Rob Lowe, Meg Tilly, Kim Cattrall, and Doug Savant. Written by Dick Wolf, the film is about a recently orphaned heiress in the Hamptons who falls in love with a young yacht racing captain who is not completely truthful with her about his past.

Produced and distributed by Metro-Goldwyn-Mayer, Masquerade was filmed on location in Long Island in the spring of 1987. It was released theatrically on March 11, 1988. The film grossed $15.8 million at the box office and was met with mixed reviews from film critics, though it received praise for its performances, cinematography, and elements of classic Hollywood film noir. It was nominated for the Edgar Allan Poe Award for Best (Mystery) Motion Picture in 1989.

== Plot ==
Set in the upscale town of Southampton, Long Island, young yachting captain Tim Whalen is having an affair with Brooke, who is married to Granger Morrison, Tim's boss. Tim is the new captain of Granger's racing sailboat Obsession. Young heiress Olivia Lawrence has returned home to Southampton shortly after her mother's death. She meets Tim at a party, and agrees to go sailing with him.

Olivia's alcoholic stepfather, Tony Gateworth, and his new live-in girlfriend, Anne Briscoe, reside in Olivia's house. Olivia is unable to evict him because her mother's will provided him access to the family's eight properties and grants him a one million dollar a year allowance, which barely covers his gambling debts. Olivia despises her stepfather, who married her mother for money.

Olivia and Tim go sailing on Olivia's late father's sail boat, Masquerade. Later, at Olivia's mansion, a drunken Gateworth insults Tim, his former sailing competitor. Olivia and Tim begin dating and eventually fall in love. However, Olivia's newfound happiness is soon offset by another ugly confrontation with Gateworth who, claiming to be acting as her "guardian," wants Tim out of her life. Olivia confides to her aunt that Tim is the first man she has felt comfortable with and that he is uninterested in her money.

Gateworth and Tim are actually conspiring to murder Olivia for her money. When Tim hesitates, Gateworth threatens to expose his shady past. He says the next step is for Tim to gain Olivia's confidence by protecting her. That weekend, Olivia and Tim sleep together. A drunken Gateworth barges into Olivia's bedroom as planned, but Tim double-crosses him and kills Gateworth with his own gun. Believing the police will accuse Tim of murder, Olivia claims she killed Gateworth in self-defense. Tim establishes an alibi with an unsuspecting Brooke. During the investigation, Officer Mike McGill — a childhood friend with a romantic interest in Olivia — finds evidence that Tim may have been involved in the killing but does not report it, presumably because of his feelings for Olivia.

Anne begins questioning the investigation's findings, and tells the authorities about Olivia and Tim. Meanwhile, Tim ends his relationship with Brooke, who later confirms Tim's alibi to the police. Not long after, Anne informs McGill that her friend saw Gateworth at a diner with Tim; she is found hanged in an apparent suicide. McGill requests an autopsy.

While sailing aboard Masquerade, Olivia proposes to Tim, but he is reluctant, saying he was previously convicted for writing bad checks. He also admits his affair with Brooke. His "honesty" impresses Olivia, and the couple marry. Olivia becomes pregnant soon after. That night, Tim drives to the marina where he secretly meets McGill, who in fact has planned everything. Tim is reluctant about murdering Olivia, but McGill insists she die in a staged accident. He threatens to put Tim away for Gateworth's murder if he fails to cooperate.

When McGill learns Tim will not kill Olivia and they are sailing to Florida on Masquerade the next day, he sabotages the sailboat and plants incriminating evidence in Tim's dresser drawer. Tim discovers McGill's treachery and races to the marina to save Olivia, but the gas explosion kills him. In the marina office immediately after, Olivia discovers a newspaper clipping with a photo of Tim, Gateworth and McGill, just as McGill enters the office. Seeing that she has discovered the conspiracy, McGill tries to kill her. In the ensuing struggle, Olivia pushes McGill out a window, causing his death. At Tim's funeral, Olivia's lawyer says that Tim had recently insisted on being removed from Olivia's will and he came to love her in the end.

== Cast ==
- Rob Lowe as Tim Whalen
- Meg Tilly as Olivia Lawrence
- Kim Cattrall as Brooke Morrison
- Doug Savant as Officer Mike McGill
- John Glover as Tony Gateworth
- Dana Delany as Anne Briscoe
- Erik Holland as Chief of Police
- Brian Davies as Granger Morrison
- Barton Heyman as Tommy McGill
- Bernie McInerney as Harland Fitzgerald
- Bill Lopatto as Weyburn
- Pirie MacDonald as Theodore Cantrell
- Maeve McGuire as Aunt Eleanor
- Ira Wheeler as Uncle Charles
- Timothy Landfield as Sam
- Karen McLaughlin as Jillian
- Nada Rowand as Mrs. Chase
- Bruce Tuthill as Lt. Wacker
- Boz Scaggs as Cop #2
- Henry Ravelo as Alberto

== Production ==
=== Development ===
The film was originally called Dying for Love, though MGM mandated the title change to Masquerade during production. Dick Wolf claimed the title was changed because of studio nervousness due to a series of AIDS-awareness condom ads equating making love with death. It was the first American film from Bob Swaim, an American director who had forged a career in France, and enjoyed success with La Balance. The project was greenlit by Alan Ladd Jr. at Metro-Goldwyn-Mayer (MGM).

Rob Lowe promoted his then-girlfriend Melissa Gilbert for the lead role but she was not cast.

Asked about the torrid sex scene with Lowe, Meg Tilly said, "I have nothing against nudity if it serves a purpose other than bringing in more dollars, but I'd never done a love scene before and I found it hard to do. We all feel sensitive about the way we behave in bed and it's strange having someone watch and correct you--and Bob (Swaim) did give quite a bit of direction in those scenes," she added with a laugh.

=== Filming ===
The film was shot over approximately ten weeks. Principal photography took place on Long Island in Amagansett, Bridgehampton, East Hampton, Gardiners Bay, Montauk Harbor, Riverhead, Sag Harbor, Shelter Island, and Southampton Village. Filming also took place at the Aero Theatre in Santa Monica, California.

== Release ==
Metro-Goldwyn-Mayer released Masquerade theatrically on March 11, 1988 in 1,030 theaters.

=== Home media ===
CBS/Fox Video released Masquerade on VHS in late 1988. MGM Home Entertainment later issued it on DVD in 2004. Kino Lorber released the film on Blu-ray on September 21, 2021.

== Reception ==
=== Box office ===
The film earned $3,500,259 during its opening weekend in the United States, and went on to gross a total of $15,855,828 domestically. Lowe later wrote in his autobiography that "The movie bombed. It was stylish and sexy (maybe too much so), and I still like it very much. But the studio releasing it was being sold and was in chaos. I also heard that the studio president’s wife hated “all that sex” in the movie. At any rate, my stock took another hit and it would be my last starring role in a studio movie for years."

=== Critical response ===
The film received mixed reviews upon its release. In his review in the Chicago Sun-Times, Roger Ebert gave the film three of four stars. Ebert singling out Meg Tilly's performance wrote, "Tilly's acting style is the right choice for the movie: Her dreaminess, which at first seems distracting, becomes an important part of the suspense, because while she drifts in her romantic reverie, a sweet smile on her face, we're mentally screaming at her to wake up and smell the coffee."

In her review in The Washington Post, Rita Kempley called the film "mushy" and "pockey". Kempley reduces the director's efforts to "a gym teacher's sense of the erotic matched with a jackhammer's flair for the subtleties of psychological artifice." Janet Maslin of The New York Times praised the film's casting and performances, as well as John Barry's "swelling score" and David Watkins' "scenic cinematography [which] contribute greatly to the rhapsodic mood."

Ted Mahar of The Oregonian compared the film to Suspicion (1941), The Heiress (1949), and A Place in the Sun (1951), praising it for its "subtle" commentary on social class: "Some may miss most of it, but it's neatly done and often borders on satire... The rest of the film is cleverly written, well acted and richly photographed by David Watkin. Those who can overlook the crime plot's sometimes clumsy mechanics will find a graceful, increasingly engaging tale of an evolving relationship." FilmInk also argued the film was an homage to Suspicion.

Time Out similarly compared the film to classic film noir, likening it to the works of Alfred Hitchcock, though the publication felt that Swain's "analysis of American class structures is limited: the film finally sides with the rich as innocent victims of the criminally-embittered less privileged." Film scholar Martin Rubin describes Masquerade as part of a trend of "noir pastiches whose plots evoke classical noir but whose styles are brighter, glossier, and more mainstream, with at most a patina of noirlike eccentricity."

Rob Lowe said to Variety: "I remember [Wolf] saying to me how frustrated he was in the movie business, that he was going to write a pilot, and he wrote Law & Order. And the rest is history. You're welcome. Yeah, I'm happy to provide the bomb that powers your rise to dominance".

=== Accolades ===
Institution	Year	Category	Recipient(s)	Result	Ref.
Edgar Allan Poe Awards	1989	Best Motion Picture	Dick Wolf	Nominated	

== Sources ==
- Grant, John (2023). A Comprehensive Encyclopedia of Film Noir: The Essential Reference Guide. Milwaukee, Wisconsin: Limelight Editions. ISBN 978-1-493-08165-3.
- Hirsch, Foster (2004). Detours and Lost Highways: A Map of Neo-Noir. New York City, New York: Limelight Editions. ISBN 978-1-617-74784-7.
- Lowe, Rob (2011). Stories I Tell My Friends: The Autobiography. New York City, New York: St. Martin's Griffin. ISBN 978-1-446-46306-2.
- Rubin, Martin (1999). Thrillers. Genres in American Cinema. Cambridge, England: Cambridge University Press. ISBN 978-0-521-58839-3.
