= Conrad Roberts =

American actor

- Born: Antigua, West Indies
- Occupation: Actor
- Years active: 1968-present
- Children: Aishah Roberts

Conrad Roberts is an Antiguan-American actor who has appeared in several television series and films over the past forty years. His most recent film was A Wrinkle In Time.

== Career ==
He began his career in March 1968 when he was cast as "Edward Stark" on the series The Doctors; he appeared in over one hundred episodes of the series. After leaving the series in 1969, Roberts spent the next fifteen years appearing in various film productions. He also has a brief spoken word performance on the final track of Miles Davis's 1971 live/studio album Live-Evil. During the 1980s, he became best known for his appearance in the film The Mosquito Coast as well as for a smaller role in the cult horror film The Serpent and the Rainbow.

In 1989, Roberts was granted a recurring role in Miami Vice as "Police Commissioner Williford". He only appeared in two episodes before returning to film roles. During the 1990s, he appeared in The Mask of Zorro and also appeared as a guest star on The X-Files. In 2002, Roberts gained a higher notoriety as a film star when he appeared in The Scorpion King in a major supporting role.

In the 2000s and beyond, Roberts returned to television with guest roles on NCIS, The Unit, CSI, and most recently The River.

== Filmography ==
=== Film ===
Year	Title	Role
1972	Up the Sandbox	Clay
1979	Firepower	Lestor Wallace
1985	Streetwalkin'	Steller
1986	The Mosquito Coast	Mr. Haddy
1988	The Serpent and the Rainbow	Christophe
1990	Green Card	Taxi Driver
1991	The Hard Way	Witherspoon
1998	The Mask of Zorro	Black Zorro
1999	Man on the Moon	College Promoter
2000	The Million Dollar Hotel	Stix
2002	The Scorpion King	Chieftain
2003	The Dig (Short film)	Stranger
2009	Boppin' at the Glue Factory	Tharin Sanders
2016	Man Rots from the Head (Short film)	Mr. Z
2016	Cardboard Boxer	Methusalah
2017	Lemon	Gilly
2017	And Then There Was Eve	Joe
2018	A Wrinkle in Time	Elegant Man

=== Television ===
Year	Title	Role	Notes
1968–1969	The Doctors	Edward Stark	Main cast
1980	Casino	Inspector Ferber	TV movie
1989	Miami Vice	Commissioner Henry Williford	2 episodes
1993	Ghostwriter	Mr. Braithwaite	2 episodes
1999	The X-Files	Primitive African Man	Episode: "The Sixth Extinction"
2005	NCIS	Benjamin King	Episode: "Pop Life"
2007	The Unit	Elder	Episode: "The Outsiders"
2009	CSI: Crime Scene Investigation	Palo Priest	Episode: "Mascara"
2012	The River	Tribal Elder	Episode: "A Tribal Elder"
2016	The Get Down	Uncle Johnny	Episode: "Where There Is Ruin, There Is Hope for a Treasure"
