= Burma Sahib =

2024 novel by Paul Theroux

- Front cover
- Author: Paul Theroux
- Language: English
- Publisher: Hamish Hamilton (UK, 2024)
- Publication place: United Kingdom
- Media type: Print
- Pages: 400
- ISBN: 978-0063297548

Burma Sahib is a historical novel by American author Paul Theroux, published in 2024. The narrative offers a fictionalized account of George Orwell’s early life, focusing on his tenure as a colonial police officer in Burma (now Myanmar) during the 1920s. The novel explores the formative experiences that influenced Orwell’s later literary works and political views.

== Plot summary ==
Set in the 1920s, Burma Sahib follows Eric Blair (later known by his pen name, George Orwell) as he serves in the Indian Imperial Police in British-ruled Burma. Drawing from historical records and Orwell’s own writings, Theroux reconstructs Blair’s internal conflicts and disillusionment with colonial rule. The narrative delves into Blair’s personal and professional challenges, including his interactions with colonial society and his evolving perspective on imperialism.

== Reception ==
William Boyd in The New York Times wrote that "The Burma that he conjures in these pages is wonderfully present in lush and dense prose ... Theroux is now in his early 80s and this novel is one of his finest, in a long and redoubtable oeuvre. The talent is in remarkable shape."

Toby Lichtig writing in The Wall Street Journal was more critical commenting that "The examination of Blair’s divided self is intriguing, if heavy-handed. Mr. Theroux has done his research and, although he wears his learning gaudily, many readers will enjoy the bright display. But the frequent repetitions and hectoring tone are less forgivable."

Lara Feigel in a generally positive review in The Guardian, suggested that "the evils of empire are brought to life in this fascinating imagining of Orwell’s days as a colonial policeman, but the perspective of Burmese people is sidelined."
