= Girls at Play =

1969 novel by Paul Theroux

Girls At Play
- First US edition
- Author: Paul Theroux
- Language: English
- Publisher: Houghton Mifflin (US); The Bodley Head (UK)
- Publication date: 1969

Girls At Play is the third novel by American author Paul Theroux published in 1969 by Houghton Mifflin in the US and by The Bodley Head in the UK. It is set in 1967 in a girls school in Kenya (though throughout it is only referred to as being in East Africa).

== Inspiration ==
Theroux's first wife taught at a girls' school in upcountry Kenya. He writes an Author Note: "In Kenya, two hundred miles from Nairobi, on the Kampala Road, there is a high cool place which is still called by some 'the White Highlands'. My wife tells me there is a girls’ school there, but I have never seen it, and neither has she...The school and all the girls in this book are fiction."

== Plot summary ==
40-year-old Miss Poole returned to East Africa after spending an unhappy eight years in London following an attack at her family's farm in East Africa. She is now the headmistress of a girls school in the bush, having only cats as her company. English woman Heather Monkhouse having left her previous teaching post in Nairobi arrives, accompanied by her large dog Rufus. Heather thought she was going to teach domestic science but Miss Poole expects her to teach English and Drama. Heather, Miss Poole, Billie Jean (B.J.) from San Diego and Pamela Male a biology teacher met weekly for dinner, rotating meals between them, Heather and Miss Poole vying to make their evenings as unpleasant as possible. The feud between them worsens as B.J. and Male watch. Their respective servants are pulled into the dispute and then leave. Miss Poole then becomes ill as Heather manages the school much to Miss Poole's dismay. Heather's reason for leaving her previous school is not revealed until the end of the novel.

== Reception ==
- Laurence Lafore in The New York Times writes that Paul Theroux "tells his tale of terror and cruelty with cold detachment dressed in wit and irony, and his cold-bloodedness is so relentless that it becomes in itself a sort of cruelty inflicted on the reader. He is out to instruct us in the ways that life and death can be horrible, and he does so with such persuasiveness that quite trivial details become nightmares" And he concludes "The book is very convincing. The punctilious realism of the details, the strange, haunting ubiquity of the African landscape, the plausibility of characters divested of the straitjackets of their own conventional worlds, are lessons in a course in the high cost of sudden social change. Mr. Theroux's intellectual edifice is stunningly logical and eerily lit by the appalling certainty of approaching doom. The horrors are both engrossing and clinging. The reader, dreading tragedy to come, will stay up half the night in avid eagerness for its fulfilment, and then he will have nightmares until he wakes."
- Kirkus Reviews is also positive about the 'brilliant little tale' and writes that Theroux has a "strong impulse toward satiric hilarity, plus his merciless view of human pretensions in an 'emerging' primitive society" which "tilts abruptly toward violence and horror, with intervals of devilish humor...Glittering savagery, exquisitely mounted."
