= Half Moon Street (film) =

1986 American film by Bob Swaim

- Theatrical release poster
- Directed by: Bob Swaim
- Written by: Edward Behr; Bob Swaim; Paul Theroux
- Based on: Doctor Slaughter by Paul Theroux
- Produced by: Geoffrey Reeve
- Starring: Sigourney Weaver; Michael Caine
- Cinematography: Peter Hannan
- Edited by: Richard Marden
- Music by: Richard Harvey
- Production companies: RKO Pictures; Edward R. Pressman Film; Geoff Reeve Enterprises
- Distributed by: 20th Century Fox (United States theatrical); Embassy Home Entertainment (International theatrical and worldwide home video)
- Release date: 13 August 1986
- Running time: 90 minutes
- Country: United States
- Language: English
- Budget: $8 million
- Box office: $2.3 million

Half Moon Street is a 1986 American erotic thriller film directed by Bob Swaim and starring Sigourney Weaver, Michael Caine, Keith Buckley, and P. J. Kavanagh. The film is about an American woman working at a foreign research and policy institute in London who moonlights for a British escort service, becoming involved in the political intrigues surrounding one of her clients.

The film was based on the 1984 novel Doctor Slaughter by Paul Theroux. Despite the source material, the film and book have distinct endings.

Half Moon Street was the first RKO Pictures solo feature film produced in almost a quarter-century. The previous one was Jet Pilot, which had been released in 1957.

== Plot ==
Dr. Lauren Slaughter, Ph.D., is an American academic living in London, where she holds a prestigious but low-paid job at a Middle East policy institute. Her superiors take credit for her work and she struggles to pay the rent on her dilapidated flat.

After an anonymous individual mails her a video tape promoting the financial rewards of working as an escort, Slaughter signs up with the high-end Jasmine Escort Agency and begins moonlighting as an escort to rich men. These include a Palestinian businessman called Karim, who gifts her the lease on his rented apartment on Half Moon Street, and Lord Bulbeck, a trusted member of the House of Lords with a key role in international diplomacy and national defense.

Slaughter and Bulbeck strike up a relationship that goes beyond sex, each enjoying the other's conversation and intelligence. However, Bulbeck's work on a delicate Middle East peace process forces him to miss a series of dates, causing Slaughter to feel rejected.

Slaughter briefly takes up with a playboy called Sonny, who later shows up at her apartment. He attacks her and threatens her with a gun, but she tricks and kills him. Karim arrives and also holds her at gunpoint, revealing that he was the one who sent her the video tape. Karim and Sonny are part of a conspiracy to destroy the peace process by murdering Bulbeck while he is in the company of a prostitute, thus killing both the man and his reputation. A special forces team storms the apartment and kills Karim. Slaughter and Bulbeck rekindle their romance.

== Cast ==
- Sigourney Weaver as Dr. Lauren Slaughter
- Michael Caine as Lord Bulbeck
- Patrick Kavanagh as General Sir George Newhouse
- Faith Kent as Lady Newhouse
- Ram John Holder as Lindsay Walker
- Keith Buckley as Hugo Van Arkady
- Ann Hanson as Mrs. Van Arkady
- Patrick Newman as Julian Shuttle
- Niall O'Brien as Captain Twilley
- Nadim Sawalha as Karim Hatami
- Vincent Lindon as Sonny
- Muriel Villiers as Madame Cybele
- Michael Elwyn as Tom Haldane
- Ninka Scott as Mrs. Haldane
- Jasper Jacob as Rex Lanham
- Donald Pickering as George Hardcastle
- Maria Aitken as The Hon. Maura Hardcastle
- Joseph Karimbeik as Colonel Hassan Ali
- Anita Edwards as Mrs. Hassan Ali
- Angus MacInnes as Bill Rafferty
- John Sinclair as French Businessman
- Eiji Kusuhara as Japanese Businessman
- Togo Igawa as Japanese Waiter
- Rupert Vansittart as Alan Platts-Williams
- Anne Lambton as Sidney Platts-Williams
- Philip Whitchurch as Plainclothesman
- Robert Lee as Chinese Ambassador
- Janet McTeer as Van Arkady's Secretary
- Carol Cleveland as American Wife
- Katherine Schofield as Overdressed Lady
- Siobhan Redmond as Institute Secretary

== Reception ==
Roger Ebert gave Half Moon Street three out of four stars, concluding that the film "is interesting primarily because of the interaction between Weaver and Caine. Swaim deserves credit for the intelligence and wit of the first 80 or 90 minutes, but must also take the blame for the ending, which is a complete surrender to generic conventions."

== See also ==
- Ulajh, a 2024 film with a similar premise
