= The Great Railway Bazaar =

Travel book by Paul Theroux

- First edition (publ. Houghton Mifflin)
- Author: Paul Theroux
- Publication date: 1975
- Followed by: The Old Patagonian Express

The Great Railway Bazaar: By Train Through Asia is a travelogue by American novelist Paul Theroux, first published in 1975. It recounts Theroux's four-month journey by train in 1973 from London through Europe, the Middle East, the Indian subcontinent and Southeast Asia, and his return via the Trans-Siberian Railway. The first part of the route, to India, followed what was then known as the hippie trail. It is widely regarded as a classic in the genre of travel writing. It sold 1.5 million copies upon release.

In the book, Theroux explored themes such as colonialism, American imperialism, poverty, and ignorance. These were embedded in his accounts of sights and sounds he experienced as well as his conversation with other people such as his fellow travelers. It included elements of fiction such as descriptions of places, situations, and people, reflecting the author's own thoughts and outlook. Contemporaneous reviews noted how his background allowed him the breadth of insights to authoritatively describe people even when there are instances when he committed ethnic generalizations. Prior to the publication of The Great Railway Bazaar, Theroux lived in Africa, Singapore, and England.

In a 2013 article, Theroux outlined several inspirations that led him to embark on his journey and publish his experiences. These include his fascination for trains, which offered what he described as an opportunity to break monotony as well as a respite from work. He wrote:

I could think clearly on the London trains and when, on the rare occasions, I travelled out of London – on the Exeter line via Sherborne, Yeovil, and Crewkerne, to visit my in‑laws, or on the Flying Scotsman on a journalistic assignment, my spirits revived and I saw with clarity that it might be possible to conceive a book based on a long railway journey.

== Sequel ==
In 2006, Theroux retraced the journey, finding that people and places had changed, and that while his earlier work was known in many places, he was not recognised in person. His account of this second journey was published as Ghost Train to the Eastern Star.
