= The Kingdom by the Sea =

1983 travel book by Paul Theroux

- Author: Paul Theroux
- Subject: Travel
- Publisher: Penguin Books
- Publication date: 1983
- ISBN: 978-0395346457
- Preceded by: The Old Patagonian Express
- Followed by: Sailing Through China

The Kingdom by the Sea: A Journey Around Great Britain, originally published in 1983, is the account of a three-month-long journey taken by novelist Paul Theroux around the United Kingdom in the summer of 1982. Starting his journey in London, he takes a train to Margate on the English coast. He then travels roughly clockwise round the British coastline, mainly by train, getting as far north as Cape Wrath. He ends his journey in Southend. 1982 was the summer of the Falklands War and the year when Prince William was born.

The title of the book is taken from the opening lines of the poem Annabel Lee by Edgar Allan Poe: It was many and many a year ago/ In a kingdom by the sea,/ That a maiden there lived whom you may know/ By the name of Annabel Lee.
