= Jungle Lovers =

1971 novel by Paul Theroux

- First US edition
- Author: Paul Theroux
- Cover artist: Push Pin Studios
- Language: English
- Publisher: Houghton Mifflin (US); The Bodley Head (UK)
- Publication date: 1971
- Publication place: United Kingdom
- Media type: Print
- Pages: 307
- ISBN: 0-395-12107-8

Jungle Lovers is a 1971 novel by American author Paul Theroux. Set in post-colonial Malawi, it was published by Houghton Mifflin (US) and The Bodley Head (UK). The author worked in Malawi from 1963 to 1965 with the United States Peace Corps, before being deported for public criticism of dictator Hastings Banda. The Banda regime banned the novel in Malawi for many years.

== Background ==
After being deported from Malawi, Theroux was fired from the Peace Corps, as he had violated restrictions against getting involved in country politics. He moved to Asia and in 1968 got a job teaching Jacobean literature at the University of Singapore. One of the conditions was that he neither write nor publish anything about Singapore while he was there. He instead wrote a novel inspired by his time in Malawi, keeping his writing secret from his employers. He contracted dengue fever and was able to work on the book only in the evenings and at weekends. It took him over two years to write.

In an introduction to the novel for the German edition, Theroux revealed that the two main characters, an insurance salesman and a revolutionary activist, were two opposing sides of his own personality. He had thought he could protect his pupils while he was a teacher in the country, but spoke out in support of the opposition at a time of political turmoil. He was deported from Malawi in 1965, charged with "covert revolutionary activities". He later wrote that this was "a novel of futility and failed hopes".

== Plot introduction ==
The story concerns Calvin Mullet from Hudson, Massachusetts, a recently divorced insurance salesman working in Malawi; and Marais, a white leader of a guerrilla army intent on overthrowing the government of the country.

Calvin is based in a brothel in the capital Blantyre but makes frequent journeys to Lilongwe further north, where he is captured by Marais (to whom he tries to sell a policy) and then released. Disillusioned with his work, Calvin is secretly writing a book, The Uninsured, as an outlet to his frustrations. In one of his trips to Lilongwe he meets and falls in love with Mira, a young native girl. On a later return trip, he learns that her brother has been killed and she has been raped by Marais' rebels. He brings her to the south and marries her.

== Reception ==
In The New York Times, Mordecai Richler wrote "Jungle Lovers is filled with incidental delights, some very funny set-pieces. It is also enriched by a clean, ironic prose style and a powerful narrative drive. The novel's architecture is undeniably intelligent, but, alas, the beams show through clearly, the author's hand ever-present. I couldn't believe in the metamorphosis of Mullet from clumsy Babbittry to a character whose perceptions about Africa, though they do his maker credit, rest uneasily on his fragile shoulders. Marais's undoing, I fear, also owes more to ideological geometry than to life. There is too much that is superimposed, too little that flows with inner life."

The back cover of the 1982 Penguin edition quotes the review of The Scotsman: "Linguistic exuberance, imaginative daring, a splendid ear for the rhythms of speech, a keen eye for human oddity." Kirkus Reviews praised the figure of Calvin Mullet, concluding that readers will "again find the exceptional in this disarmingly gifted writer."
