= The Mosquito Coast (film) =

1986 American drama film directed by Peter Weir

- Theatrical release poster by John Alvin
- Directed by: Peter Weir
- Screenplay by: Paul Schrader
- Based on: The Mosquito Coast by Paul Theroux
- Produced by: Jerome Hellman
- Starring: Harrison Ford; Helen Mirren; River Phoenix; Conrad Roberts; Andre Gregory; Martha Plimpton
- Cinematography: John Seale
- Edited by: Thom Noble
- Music by: Maurice Jarre
- Production company: The Saul Zaentz Company
- Distributed by: Warner Bros.
- Release date: November 26, 1986
- Running time: 117 minutes
- Country: United States
- Language: English
- Budget: $25 million
- Box office: $14.3 million

The Mosquito Coast is a 1986 American drama film directed by Peter Weir and starring Harrison Ford, Helen Mirren, Andre Gregory, and River Phoenix. It is based on the 1981 novel by Paul Theroux. The film tells the story of a family that leaves the United States and tries to find a happier and simpler life in the jungles of Central America. However, their jungle paradise quickly turns into a dystopia as the stubborn father's behavior becomes increasingly erratic and aggressive. Filming locations included Cartersville and Rome in Georgia, Baltimore, and Belize.

== Plot ==
Inventor Allie Fox has grown fed up with the American Dream and consumerism. He believes that a nuclear war is on the horizon as a result of American greed and crime. After Allie and his eldest son Charlie acquire the components at a local dump, he finishes assembling an ice machine known as "Fat Boy." Mr. Polski, an asparagus farm owner, has hired Allie to create a cooling system for his barn to keep his crop from spoiling. Allie, Charlie, and Allie's youngest son, Jerry, meet Polski, and Allie shows him "Fat Boy." The machine can use extreme heat to create ice on the spot, but Polski is unimpressed.

The next morning, Allie throws a party for the immigrant workers before telling his family that they will be leaving the United States. On board a Panamanian barge, the family meets Reverend Spellgood, a missionary, his wife, and their daughter, Emily. When the barge docks in Belize City, the families go their separate ways. From a drunken German, Allie purchases Jeronimo, a small village in the rainforest along the river.

Mr. Haddy, a boatman, takes Allie and his family upriver to Jeronimo. Allie meets the inhabitants and builds a new, "advanced" civilization. The locals, including Haddy, take kindly to the family. Spellgood arrives to convert Jeronimo's citizens. In the process, Allie and Spellgood angrily denounce each other, leading to a continuing schism: Allie believes Spellgood to be a religious zealot; Spellgood believes Allie to be a communist. Allie sets out to construct a huge version of "Fat Boy" that can supply the town with ice. Upon completing the machine, he hears rumors of a native tribe in the mountains that has never seen ice. He recruits his sons to carry a load of ice into the jungle to supply the tribe. Upon arriving, Allie finds that the load has melted and the tribe has already been visited by missionaries. Allie also makes contact with three armed men who are hiding in a nearby hut.

After returning to Jeronimo, Allie learns that Spellgood has left with much of the populace, scaring them with stories of God's biblical destruction. The near-empty town is visited by the armed men from the remote village, who demand to use Jeronimo as a base. Allie bunks the rebels in the giant ice machine, tells Charlie to lock its only other exit, and activates it. The rebels try to shoot their way out, and the gunfire sets off an explosion within the machine. By the next morning, the machine and the family's home are in ruins, and chemicals from the destroyed machine have severely polluted the river.

Forced downstream, Allie and his family arrive at the coast. Allie, refusing to believe that his dream has been shattered, announces that they have all they need on the beach and tells them that the United States has been destroyed in a nuclear war. Settling on the beach in a houseboat he has built and refusing assistance from Haddy, Allie believes that the family has accomplished building a utopia. One night, the storm surge from a tropical cyclone nearly forces the family out to sea until Charlie reveals that he has been hiding motor components, allowing them to start the outboard motor on the boat.

Forced to travel upstream again, Charlie and Jerry grow resentful of their father. Coming ashore when the family stumbles across Spellgood's compound, Allie sees barbed wire and mutters that the settlement is a Christian concentration camp. While the rest of the family sleeps, Charlie and Jerry sneak over to the Spellgood home. They find out that the United States was not destroyed and that Emily will assist them in escaping from Allie. Before Charlie can persuade Mother and his sisters to leave, Allie sets Spellgood's church on fire. Spellgood shoots Allie, paralyzing him from the neck down. The family escapes aboard the boat.

The family begins traveling downriver again, with Allie drifting in and out of consciousness. He asks his wife if they are going upstream, and she lies to him for the first time. Allie soon dies.

== Cast ==
- Harrison Ford as Allie Fox
- Helen Mirren as Margot "Mother" Fox
- River Phoenix as Charlie Fox
- Conrad Roberts as Mr. Haddy
- Andre Gregory as Reverend Spellgood
- Martha Plimpton as Emily Spellgood
- Melanie Boland as Mrs. Spellgood
- Dick O'Neill as Mr. Polski
- Jadrien Steele as Jerry Fox
- Hilary Gordon as April Fox
- Rebecca Gordon (Hilary's real-life twin sister) as Clover Fox
- Alice Heffernan-Sneed as Mrs. Polski
- Jason Alexander as Hardware Clerk
- William Newman as Captain Smalls
- Aurora Clavel as Mrs. Maywit
- Butterfly McQueen as Mrs. Kennywick

== Production ==
Producer Jerome Hellman bought the rights to Theroux's novel as soon as it was published, and Weir committed to filming it. Jack Nicholson was originally offered the lead role, but backed out over salary disputes.

As the film went into pre-production, and Weir was in Central America scouting for locations, the financial backing for the film fell through and the project was suspended indefinitely. In the meantime, Weir was approached to direct Witness starring Harrison Ford. The film, which was Weir's first American production, was a critical and commercial success, garnering eight Academy Award nominations including Weir for Best Director, Ford for Best Actor, and the film itself for Best Film. During the production of Witness, Weir discussed The Mosquito Coast with Ford who became interested in the role of Allie Fox (though Ford's agent was less enthusiastic). With Ford attached to the project, financial backing and distribution for the film was easier to find (ultimately from Saul Zaentz and Warner Bros. Pictures).

Filming began the week of February 7, 1986, in Belize and finished there on April 26 before moving to Georgia. Weir and Ford famously missed the Academy Awards ceremony for which they had both been nominated for Witness, which won two Oscars, for Best Original Screenplay and Best Film Editing .

The film contains the last feature film role of Butterfly McQueen, who had a prominent role in Gone with the Wind. She plays a lapsed churchgoer, and in real life was a vocal atheist.

== Reception ==
The film was initially a critical and commercial disappointment but has since received much stronger modern reviews. On Rotten Tomatoes the film has an approval rating of 78% based on 27 reviews, with an average rating of 6.6/10. The site's critics consensus reads: "Harrison Ford capably tackles a tough, unlikable role, producing a fascinating and strange character study." On Metacritic the film has a weighted average score of 49 out of 100, based on 12 critics, indicating "mixed or average reviews". Audiences surveyed by CinemaScore gave the film an average grade B− on an A+ to F scale.

Siskel & Ebert were split, Siskel giving the film a "thumbs up" and Ebert giving it a "thumbs down," criticizing Allie Fox for being "boring." However, he did compliment Ford's performance. Vincent Canby of the New York Times called it "utterly flat." In her review for the Washington Post, Rita Kempley wrote:

Sooner or later a man of invention will pollute paradise, a grand contradiction that gives Mosquito its bite and Ford inspiration for his most complex portrayal to date. As a persona of epic polarities, he animates this muddled, metaphysical journey into the jungle.

Sheila Benson of the Los Angeles Times wrote, "He's orchestrated The Mosquito Coast's action to match Fox's progressive mental state, from rage to explosion to squalls and finally to hurricane velocity; however, the film leaves us not with an apotheosis, but exhaustion." In his review for the Globe and Mail, Jay Scott wrote, "The Mosquito Coast is a work of consummate craftsmanship and it's spectacularly acted, down to the smallest roles ... but its field of vision is as narrow and eventually as claustrophobic as Allie's." The negative reviews the film received prompted Harrison Ford to defend the film in the media:

There have been mixed reviews and I think the film has been very unfairly treated in some quarters. I have never seen a serious film treated so badly by the critics. And I think they're wrong. I don't mind saying I'm here trying to counter those negative reviews.... I'm not defensive about the picture, but I want the public to hear another point of view. Critics see a film and then rush to review it. This is the sort of movie that really doesn't sink home for about three days. It is disturbing and makes you think. It stays with you.

With a production budget of $25 million, the film made a little over $14 million in North America. Despite being one of his least commercially successful films, Ford has defended it, saying in a 1992 interview:

It's the only film I have done that hasn't made its money back. I'm still glad I did it. If there was a fault with the film, it was that it didn't fully enough embrace the language of the book (by Paul Theroux). It may have more properly been a literary rather than a cinematic exercise. But I think it's full of powerful emotions.

Then-U.S. President Ronald Reagan viewed this film at Camp David on November 22, 1986.
