= Deep South (travel book) =

2015 non-fiction book by Paul Theroux

Deep South: Four Seasons on Back Roads
- Authors: Paul Theroux
- Illustrator: Steve McCurry
- Language: English
- Subject: Southern United States
- Genre: Travel literature
- Publisher: Houghton Mifflin Harcourt
- Publication date: 2015
- Pages: 441
- ISBN: 978-0241146729
- OCLC: 919896847

Deep South: Four Seasons on Back Roads is a travel book by Paul Theroux, published in 2015

== Critical reception ==
Critical reception has been mixed.

Deep South received reviews from the Financial Times and The Independent, the latter of which wrote "At the end of the road, the veteran traveller catches a glimpse of an unfamiliar figure in the eyes of those he has met: to them, he realises with a profound shock, he is old. Perhaps he has failed to evade one cliché of the quest narrative – that the final discovery of the traveller is oneself – yet Deep South is none the worse for that."

Critics for The New York Times were mixed, with Dwight Garner criticizing the work for having "slack passages, the repetitions, the lack of anything truly fresh to say" while Geoffrey C. Ward commented that "it's Theroux's remarkable gift for getting strangers to reveal themselves that makes going along for this ride worthwhile."

Reviewing the book for The Spectator, Jan Morris suggested, "Deep South is more truly a work of philosophy and analysis than of movement, and indeed includes some sharpish criticisms of conventional travel writing and its compulsory hardships."
