= Saint Jack =

1973 novel by Paul Theroux

- First edition cover (book) designed by Paul Bacon
- Author: Paul Theroux
- Language: English
- Publisher: Houghton Mifflin
- Publication date: June 1973
- Publication place: United States
- Pages: 247

Saint Jack is a 1973 novel by Paul Theroux that was adapted into a 1979 film of the same name. It tells the life of Jack Flowers, a pimp in Singapore. Feeling hopeless and undervalued, Jack tries to make money by setting up his own bordello, and clashes with Chinese triad members in the process.

== Film adaptation ==
A film adaptation directed by Peter Bogdanovich was released in 1979.
