= The Old Patagonian Express =

1979 book

- First edition (publ. Houghton Mifflin)
- Author: Paul Theroux
- Publication date: 1979
- Preceded by: The Great Railway Bazaar
- Followed by: The Kingdom by the Sea

The Old Patagonian Express, subtitled "by train through the Americas", is Paul Theroux's account of a series of rail journeys he took from the north of the United States to the Patagonian provinces of southern Argentina. It was published in 1979 by the Houghton Mifflin Company in the US and by Hamish Hamilton in the UK.

== "The journey, not the arrival, matters" ==
Starting out in February 1978 on a subway train from his home town in Massachusetts, the author flees the blizzards of North America and travels by rail across the plains to Laredo, Texas. From there he crosses the bridge over the Rio Grande and catches the train south to Veracruz via Mexico City. In his introduction to the book, Theroux explains how he had learned Spanish especially for the journey so as to include the points of view of his fellow travellers rather than concentrate on his own personal impressions. Other rules he had given himself were never to criticize to others the country through which he was passing and to give as his reason for travel that he is a geography teacher. Each of the succeeding chapter titles are where possible the name of the train on which he is riding, or else a descriptive phrase such as "The Passenger Train to Tapachula", which he catches from Veracruz to the border of Guatemala.

Theroux's journey continues across Central America, although avoiding the civil war in Nicaragua. In El Salvador he goes to a football match which descends into violence whenever the ball is kicked into the crowd, who then fight on the stands for its possession. Travelling in a variety of trains, he finally arrives in Colón, Panama and, entering the Canal Zone, travels the length of the waterway by rail at a time of unrest as the US is preparing to hand over control of the canal to the Republic of Panama. Lack of a rail link through the jungles of the Darién Gap then obliges him to take a plane to Barranquilla and from there join the Expresso del Sol over the Andes to Bogotá. By now he is coming to the conclusion "that there was a class stigma attached to the trains. Only the semidestitute, the limpers, the barefoot ones, the Indians, and the half-cracked yokels took the trains, or knew anything about them." Air, or even bus, were the preferred modes of transport.

Another gap in the route, of which he had no prior warning, forces Theroux to catch a bus to the railhead in the Colombian town of Armenia. There he comes across a group of three boys between nine and ten years old, none of them from the town itself, sleeping on cardboard in a doorway. One of them has a tubercular cough and none of them has anyone to turn to. Their parents have expelled them because their families are already too large. Later, while passing through Guayaquil in Ecuador, Theroux calls in on family of his own, distant cousins of Italian origin from his mother's side. As he continues on his journey through Peru and Bolivia, the railway route takes him over the Andes again. There he develops debilitating altitude sickness, which at the more extreme elevations can only be relieved by oxygen-filled balloons for sale on the train. It is only when the line descends to the level plains of northern Argentina that he feels himself restored to health.

A further restorative is a short stay in Buenos Aires, "the Paris of South America". While there, he is befriended by the writer Jorge Luis Borges, who is blind by now and asks Theroux to read to him some of his favourite English-language authors. Eventually, however, Theroux must complete his quest and sets out over the Welsh-settled plains of Patagonia. Eventually detraining in the very early morning at the cold and windy station of Jacobacci junction, he has to wait for the departure of La Trochita, the narrow gauge steam train which will take him to Esquel, the furthest south he can travel by rail on the continent.

== Responses ==
When the Folio Society issued a reprint of The Old Patagonian Express in 2023, they used praise from a former Financial Times as part of the publicity: "One of the most entrancing travel books written in our time". Even then, however, there were dissenting opinions. Paul Fussell, writing in The New York Times, took exception to the author's "morally facile" attitude in using the relation of disturbing experiences as "occasions for mere superior disgust". Chris Newens, on the other hand, argues in Travelmag that Theroux should be given the benefit of the doubt for exposing himself to so much discomfort and hardship and for avoiding the superficial escapism of travel writing in his curmudgeonly "refusal to provide the tourist board sanctioned version of the countries through which he travels".
