= Riding the Iron Rooster =

1988 book by Paul Theroux

- First edition
- Author: Paul Theroux
- Genre: Travel
- Publisher: Putman
- Publication date: 1988
- ISBN: 978-0-14-011295-5

Riding the Iron Rooster (1988) is a travel book by Paul Theroux primarily about his travels through China in the 1980s. One of his aims is to disprove the Chinese maxim, "you can always fool a foreigner". It won the 1989 Thomas Cook Travel Book Award.

Theroux travelled through China for a year, ending his journey in Tibet after visiting Mongolia, Xinjiang and Manchuria. He was accompanied by a bureaucrat who acted as a chaperone.

== Editions ==
- Riding the Iron Rooster, ISBN 978-0-14-011295-5
