= Blinding Light =

2005 novel by Paul Theroux

- Author: Paul Theroux
- Language: English
- Publication date: 2005

Blinding Light is a 2005 novel by Paul Theroux.

The novel had a mixed reception, with many reviewers not seeing it as entirely successful. The novel depicts an American writer and his female companion on their trip to Ecuador and its backcountry. After returning to Martha's Vineyard, the book explores their relationship against the backdrop of the social scenery of Martha's Vineyard, the Clinton–Lewinsky scandal, and the process of book writing and publishing, among other things.

== Themes ==
AV Club reviewer Scott Tobias notes that the novel follows in the tradition of Theroux's other travel writing and novels, taking the principal character to an exotic location to explore social and moral conclusions. The New York Times notes that the novel explores the "texture of psychologically plausible character, real places, and so on" under a "contemporary naturalism". For The Guardian, this writing reminded them of Theroux's travel writing, saying that the novel includes a "luxuriant and uncomfortable jungle setting, and nasty characters made up of inky national stereotypes and lists of commercial products." The book touches on the drug and sex trade that accompanies the crude oil industry in Lago Agrio, in contrast to the suggestion of mysterious and yet undiscovered plants in Ecuador that have powerful affects on the mind and sexuality. Several characters and authors are referenced in the book in regards to blindness including Siegfried Sassoon, King Lear, Ishmael in Moby Dick, Blind Pew in Treasure Island, Jorge Luis Borges, and John Milton. The bible is referenced when the author compares the blindness of Alijah to the blindness of Isaac, Samson, Eli, Zedekiah, Tobit, and Saul. The author also mentions scriptural authority suggesting that God is blind. Sexual relationships focusing on age difference is explored, along with sexual fantasy and the act of sex as a form of trespass. Trespassing, both physical and the trespass into private life, is explored. Metafiction is a part of the text as the book's narrator works on two different books within the book itself. The established authority of medicine is discussed versus the knowledge of local shamanism.

== Critical reception ==
Complete Review called the novel "generally lively and entertaining", and described the consensus of reviewers as having "varying degrees of enthusiasm, with no one thinking he really pulls it off". For example, The New York Times concluded that cultural insensitivity and tone "blot what is otherwise an enjoyable and worldly allegory of the pitfalls of literary success, which retains some of the grandeur of its model." The Guardian reviewer James Buchan described the novel as needing "a journeyman editor [who] would have cut out the repetitions, quotations, boasting, name-dropping, purple passages, dreams, hallucinations, score-settling, bombast and sex fantasies."
