= Waldo (novel) =

1967 novel by Paul Theroux

- First edition
- Author: Paul Theroux
- Language: English
- Publisher: Houghton Mifflin
- Publication date: 1967
- LC Class: PZ4.T394 Wal

Waldo is the debut novel of American novelist and travel writer Paul Theroux. It was originally published in 1967 by Houghton Mifflin.
