= Kowloon Tong (novel) =

1997 novel by Paul Theroux

- First edition (US)
- Author: Paul Theroux
- Cover artist: Michaela Sullivan
- Language: English
- Publisher: Houghton Mifflin (US); Hamish Hamilton (UK)
- Publication date: 1997
- Publication place: United States
- Media type: Print, Audio & eBook
- Pages: 243
- ISBN: 0-395-86029-6

Kowloon Tong (1997) is a novel by Paul Theroux about Neville "Bunt" Mullard, an English mummy's boy born and raised in Hong Kong. The story is set in the days leading up to the handover to China of Hong Kong from the British.

== Synopsis ==
Bunt is made an offer for his textile factory by the shady Mr Hung from the People's Republic of China, and has no choice but to accept, when it is made clear that Mr Hung knows all about the part of Bunt's life that he has kept secret from his mother Betty, namely his frequenting of the "blue hotels" of Kowloon Tong and furtive sex with one of his workers, Mei-Ping.

== Reception ==
Reception was mostly positive. Richard Bernstein in the New York Times wrote "Mr. Theroux's novel is a tingly, spicy, melancholy story reminiscent of the novels of Graham Greene, and its most salient feature is the spiritual smallness, the plain bad taste of its characters". The Wall Street Journal praises Theroux's satirization of British colonialism in his previous novels and in Kowloon Tong he "finds a natural target in the arrogant Betty but an even bigger one in the ruthless Mr. Hung. Bunt is skewered as well, but we are made to feel considerable pity for him, caught between the irresistible force of China's menacing emissary and the immovable object that is his mother". Donna Seaman in Booklist contends that "Theroux's taut and suspenseful unraveling of Bunt's little world is absolutely riveting, capturing, as it does, the haunting sound of the last nail being pounded into the coffin of the British Empire". Barbara Hoffert in the Library Journal writes "The insipid Bunt and his coarse, avaricious mother are almost unbelievably awful, but in his ruthlessness Mr. Hung is even worse. The result can be pretty dispiriting, but this chilling little novel must be read to the end to catch the full effect of Bunt's breathtaking weakness. Whether it is read as a political fable challenging Britain's colonization and abandonment of Hong Kong or a morality tale about the worst in human nature, this is grim, note-perfect in its descriptions, and, one fears, absolutely honest." A more critical note is struck by Kirkus Reviews which concludes "This hybrid story is infused with a powerful sense of menace (and an unfortunate whiff of racism) and manages a doggedly convincing characterization of its complex protagonist. But there are several long stretches during which nothing much happens, and Theroux overindulges a penchant for lengthy summaries in place of developed scenes. As a result, the book feels uneven, and sometimes hurried. A strongly imagined melodrama with a lot on its mind, but not the novel it might have been."
