= Doctor Slaughter =

1984 novel by Paul Theroux

- First edition (publ. Hamish Hamilton)
- Author: Paul Theroux
- Language: English
- Publisher: Hamish Hamilton
- Publication date: 1984
- ISBN: 0-241-11255-9 (first edition)
- Dewey Decimal: 813.54
- LC Class: PS3570.H4 D6

Doctor Slaughter is a 1984 novel by Paul Theroux. The story was also published that year in the book Half Moon Street, alongside an unrelated story, Doctor DeMarr.

The protagonist of Doctor Slaughter, Lauren Slaughter, is a young woman living in near-poverty in London. She has a Ph.D. and works at a research institute. Having already traded sexual favours for help paying the plumber's bills, Lauren easily turns to prostitution to improve her finances. Mysteriously, she receives a video documentary about the Jasmine Escort Agency, a high-priced call-girl service. Feeling herself superior to the women featured on the video, Lauren signs on with the agency. Besides improving her finances, Lauren's second job brings her in contact with the affectionate Lord Bulbeck, a British politician and the mysterious Mr Van Arkady.

In 1986, the story was made into the film Half Moon Street, starring Sigourney Weaver as the titular character.
