= The Happy Isles of Oceania =

1992 travel book by Paul Theroux

- First edition
- Author: Paul Theroux
- Publisher: Putnam
- Publication date: 1992
- Pages: 528
- ISBN: 978-0-399-13726-6
- OCLC: 25009523
- Dewey Decimal: 919.504
- LC Class: DU23.5 .T47 1992

The Happy Isles of Oceania is a travel book written by writer Paul Theroux and published in 1992. It is an account of a trip taken through the Pacific Islands shortly after the break-up of his first marriage. Starting in New Zealand, he travels to Australia and Papua New Guinea and then follows the clusters of islands throughout the Pacific Ocean, passing through Easter Island and finishing his trip in Hawaii.
