= The Mosquito Coast (novel) =

1981 novel by Paul Theroux

- First edition (UK)
- Author: Paul Theroux
- Cover artist: Henri Rousseau; The Snake Charmer (1907)
- Language: English
- Publisher: Hamish Hamilton (UK, 1981); Houghton Mifflin (US, 1982)
- Publication place: United Kingdom
- Media type: Print
- Pages: 392
- ISBN: 0-241-10688-5

The Mosquito Coast is a novel by author Paul Theroux. Published in 1981, it won the James Tait Black Memorial Prize and was the Yorkshire Post Novel of the Year.

== Inspiration ==
Theroux wrote the novel while living in London. Although he is rumored to have based the main character, Allie Fox, on himself, he denied this in an interview for Atlantic Unbound, saying he based the character on a number of people, including Pap, Huckleberry Finn's father.

== Plot ==
=== Part One: Banana Boat ===
Allie, a brilliant inventor ("with nine patents, six pending"), becomes increasingly critical of consumerism in the United States, education and culture. Allie decides to move his family from Hatfield, Massachusetts, to escape the influence of the United States and the world war he fears is imminent, to enjoy a simpler life in La Mosquitia on the eponymous Mosquito Coast of Honduras. They travel in their pick-up truck to Baltimore and after giving away their truck they board a banana boat to La Ceiba. During a violent storm, Allie repairs a bilge pump and has several run-ins with Reverend Spellgood who is traveling with his family to his mission in Honduras. His daughter Emily flirts with Allie's son, fourteen-year-old Charlie Fox.

=== Part Two: The Ice-House at Jeronimo ===
At La Ceiba, Allie buys a tiny settlement called Jeronimo from a drunk German. They then travel up the coast via motor launch to Santa Rosa, during which time Allie, through force of personality, takes over the launch from its captain, Mr. Haddy, and steers it up the Aguán River to Jeronimo. On arrival Allie inspires the local Creoles and Zambus and over the coming weeks they help him transform the overgrown settlement into a thriving community. He builds a huge ice-making machine called 'Fat Boy' powered by hydrogen and ammonia. He transports the ice it produces further up the river to isolated tribesmen, only to find to his disgust that missionaries have already reached them and 'corrupted' them to the ways of the West. He then mounts another expedition to take ice overland into Olancho, but the ice melts on the journey. They arrive at a small settlement and meet a group of Indians and three 'skinny men' whom they take to be slaves. On return to Jeronimo they find the settlement nearly deserted. A missionary, whom Allie had driven away earlier, had returned and persuaded most of the Creoles to leave with him. Soon afterwards, the three 'slaves' from Olancho arrive with guns and threaten Allie's domain. He tricks them and locks them in 'Fat Boy' intending to freeze them to death, but their gunfire causes an explosion which kills the three gunmen, destroys Jeronimo and pollutes the river.

=== Part Three: Brewer's Lagoon ===
Escaping the explosion, Allie leads his family and Mr. Haddy through the jungle to Sico River, determined to move even further from civilization, and become less dependent on technology. They borrow a boat from a Miskito and float down to Brewers Lagoon where Mr. Haddy's mother lives in a nearby village. Mr. Haddy gave directions to the Laguna Miskita, 'it so small, when you get there you ain't believe you there', which sounds ideal to Allie. On arrival they convert an abandoned dugout into a hut, beachcombing for materials (including an outboard motor which Allie repairs) and planting crops on the shore, achieving total self-sufficiency. Then the rainy season starts, and a storm surge from a tropical cyclone washes away all their work. Mr. Haddy arrives under cover of night and gives Charlie a drum of gasoline and spark plugs, which he knows Allie would not accept; Charlie hides them on the shore. Allie finds them and determines to use the supplies to sail upstream, against the flow "that Mosquito Coast is a dead loss...there's death down there...Everything broken, rotten and dead is on that stream and being pulled down to the coast... I've been fighting the current all along". Charlie and his brother Jerry want to return to the United States, but Allie tells them that it has been destroyed.

=== Part Four: Up the Patuca ===
The family heads up the Patuca River, passing several abandoned villages destroyed by the recent tropical storm. Allie bullies his family into agreeing to his plans to head farther away from civilization, and they hear about a village called Guampo far up the river. When they arrive, the Spellgoods' mission settlement is complete with harbor, landing strip and church.

That night, Charlie and his brother Jerry swim ashore and contact Emily. They arrange to borrow the Spellgoods' jeep and escape back to the coast after learning that the United States has not been destroyed. On returning to the boat, they try to persuade their mother to drive them, but they find that their father has also gone ashore. Determined to save the locals from the influence of the Spellgoods, he blows up the airplane and the generator and returns to the boat, but is shot in the neck by Rev. Spellgood. The family manages to drag Allie to the jeep and make it to the coast, where Allie dies.

=== Part Five: The Mosquito Coast ===
Mr Haddy hears of Allie's death and takes the family back to La Ceiba, and they return to the United States.

== Reception ==
Thomas R. Edwards in The New York Times praises the book, concluding "It is, characteristically, a fine entertainment, a gripping adventure story, a remarkable comic portrait of minds and cultures at cross-purposes...This excellent story, is an impressively serious act of imagination."

Kirkus Reviews criticized the novel's plausibility, pacing and thin characterizations, but goes on to say that "though the presentation of the serious ideas here is more noisy and colorful than thoughtful, the storytelling itself—full of clever descriptive writing and inventive action—sustains the entertainment mightily"

== Adaptations ==
=== 1986 film ===
The novel was first adapted into a 1986 film starring Harrison Ford, Helen Mirren and River Phoenix.

=== 2021 television series ===
The novel was adapted into a seventeen-episode television series for Apple TV+ with Justin Theroux, Paul Theroux's nephew, playing the lead role. The series was developed by Neil Cross and the premiere episode was directed by Rupert Wyatt.

== Publication history ==
- 1981, UK, Hamish Hamilton, ISBN 0-241-10688-5, Pub date 12 October 1981, Hardback
- 1982, US, Houghton Mifflin, ISBN 0-395-32075-5, Pub date May 1982, Hardback (limited edition 350 numbered copies)
- 1982, US, Houghton Mifflin, ISBN 0-395-31837-8, Pub date May 1982, Hardback
- 1982, UK, Ulverscroft, ISBN 0-708-98064-3, Pub date Aug 1982, Large print h/b
- 1982, UK, Penguin, ISBN 0-14-006089-8, Pub date 30 September 1982, Paperback
- 1983, US, Avon, ISBN 0-380-61945-8 Pub date Mar 1983, Paperback
- 1986, UK, Penguin, ISBN 0-14-008290-5, Pub date 11 December 1986, Paperback
- 1995, UK, Penguin Readers, ISBN 0-14-081454-X, Pub date 30 March 1995, Paperback
- 1999, US, Penguin Readers, ISBN 0-582-41814-3, Pub date 15 December 1999, Paperback
- 2006, US, Mariner, ISBN 0-618-65896-3, Pub date Jun 2006, Paperback
- 2008, UK, Penguin Readers, ISBN 1-4058-7664-6, Pub date 17 April 2006, Paperback
- 2010, UK, Whole Story, ISBN 1-4074-4916-8, Pub date 1 March 2010, Audio CD read by David Aaron Baker
- 2012, UK, Penguin Readers, ISBN 1-4082-9438-9, Pub date 10 June 2012, Paperback & MP3
