= Dark Star Safari =

2002 travel book by Paul Theroux

- First edition
- Author: Paul Theroux
- Language: English
- Genre: Non-fiction
- Publisher: Houghton Mifflin
- Publication date: 2002
- Publication place: United States
- Media type: Print (Hardback & Paperback)

Theroux describes his reasons for revisiting Africa for the book
from the BBC programme Bookclub, September 1, 2013.

Dark Star Safari (2002) is a written account of a trip taken by American author Paul Theroux from Cairo, Egypt, to Cape Town, South Africa, via trains, buses, cars, and armed convoy. Theroux had lived in Africa as a young and idealistic early member of the Peace Corps and part of the reason for this trip was to assess the impact on Africa of the many years of aid from Western countries. His assessment is generally critical of the long-term impact of aid programs.

Throughout the duration of the trip Theroux describes the writing of an erotic novella. This novella was eventually published in 2003, among a collection of short stories, as "The Stranger at the Palazzo D'Oro".
