= Paul Theroux =

American travel writer and novelist (born 1941)

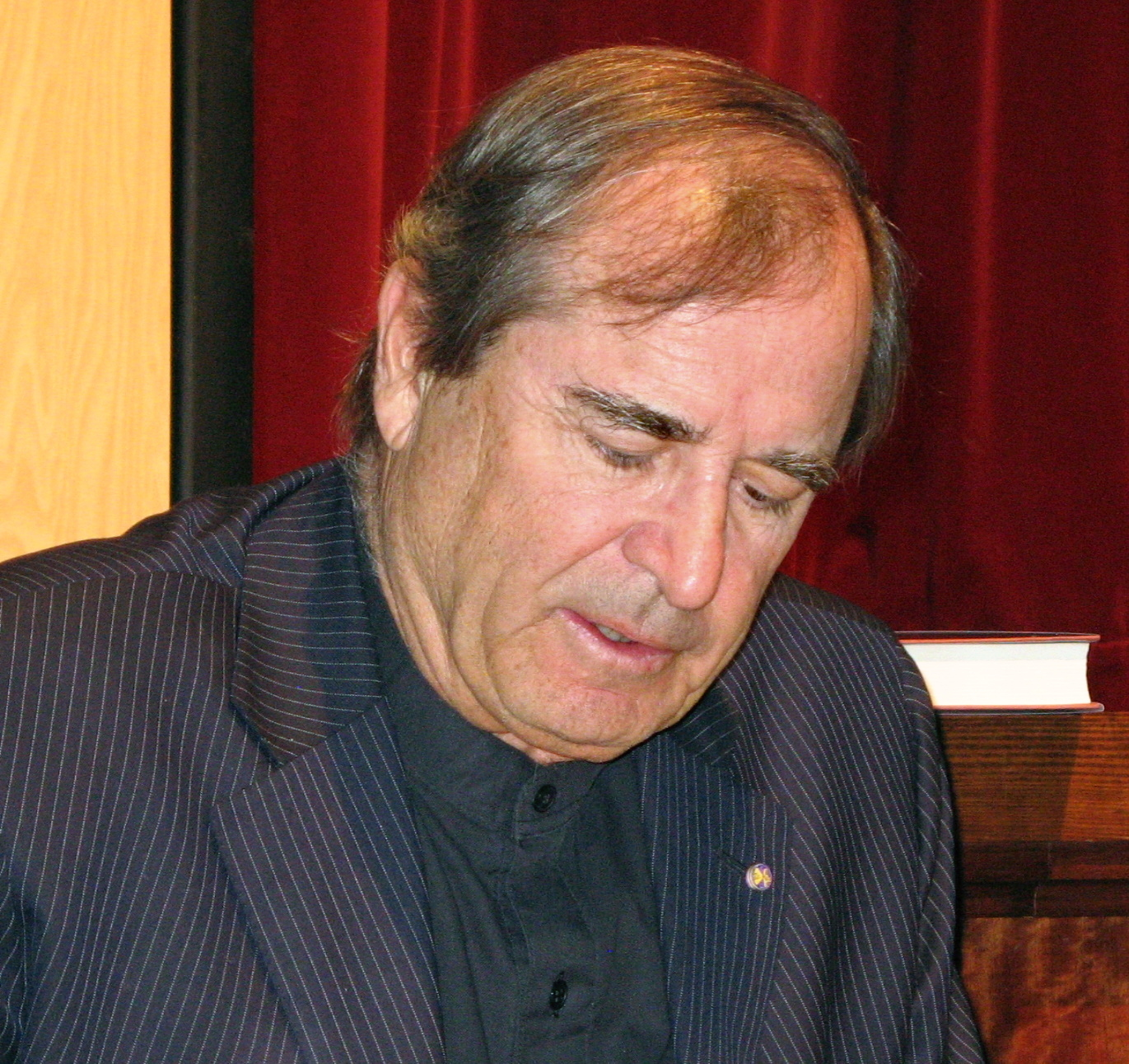
- Theroux in 2008
- Born: Paul Edward Theroux; April 10, 1941 (age 85); Medford, Massachusetts, U.S.
- Education: University of Maine; University of Massachusetts, Amherst (BA)
- Occupations: Novelist; travel writer; short story writer; literary critic
- Spouses: Anne Castle (m. 1967; div. 1993); Sheila Donnelly (m. 1995)
- Children: Marcel Theroux; Louis Theroux
- Relatives: Alexander Theroux (brother); Peter Theroux (brother); Justin Theroux (nephew)
- Writing career
- Period: 1967–present
- Paul Theroux's voice from the BBC programme Bookclub, September 1, 2013.

Paul Edward Theroux (/θəˈruː/ thə-ROO; born April 10, 1941) is an American novelist and travel writer who has written numerous books, including the travelogue The Great Railway Bazaar (1975). Some of his works of fiction have been adapted as feature films. He was awarded the 1981 James Tait Black Memorial Prize for his novel The Mosquito Coast, which was adapted for the 1986 movie of the same name and the 2021 television series of the same name.

He is the father of English-American authors and documentary filmmakers Marcel and Louis Theroux, the brother of authors Alexander Theroux and Peter Theroux, and uncle of the American actor and screenwriter Justin Theroux.

== Early life ==
Paul Theroux was born in Medford, Massachusetts, the third of seven children, and son of Catholic parents; his mother, Anne (née Dittami), was Italian-American, and his father, Albert Eugene Theroux, was of French-Canadian descent. His mother was a former grammar school teacher and painter, and his father was a shoe factory leather salesman for the American Leather Oak company. Theroux was a Boy Scout and ultimately achieved the rank of Eagle Scout.

His brothers are Eugene, Alexander, Joseph and Peter. His sisters are Ann Marie and Mary.

Theroux was educated at Medford High School, followed by the University of Maine, in Orono (1959–60), and the University of Massachusetts Amherst, where he obtained a B.A. in English in 1963.

== Career ==
After finishing his university education, Theroux joined the Peace Corps in 1963 as a teacher in Malawi. Theroux helped a political opponent of Prime Minister Hastings Banda escape to Uganda. For this, Theroux was expelled from Malawi and thrown out of the Peace Corps in 1965. He was declared persona non grata by Banda in Malawi for sympathizing with Yatuta Chisiza. As a consequence, his later novel Jungle Lovers, which concerns an attempted coup in the country, was banned in Malawi for many years.

He moved to Uganda in 1965 to teach English at Makerere University, where he also wrote for the magazine Transition. While at Makerere, Theroux began his friendship with Rajat Neogy, founder of Transition, and novelist V.S. Naipaul, then a visiting scholar at the university. During his time in Uganda, an angry mob at a demonstration threatened to overturn the car in which his pregnant wife was riding, and Theroux decided to leave Africa.

In November 1968, the couple moved with their son Marcel to Singapore, where their second son, Louis, was born. After two years of teaching at the National University of Singapore, Theroux and his family settled in England in November 1971. They lived first in Dorset, and then in south London. After his marriage ended early in 1990, Theroux returned to the United States, where he has since settled.

Theroux's caustic portrait of V. S. Naipaul in his book Sir Vidia's Shadow (1998) contrasts with his earlier, admiring portrait of the same author in V. S. Naipaul: An Introduction to his Work (1972). They had a long friendship, but Theroux said that events during the 26 years between the two books colored his perspective in the later book. The two authors reconciled in 2011 after a chance meeting at the Hay Literary Festival, an episode described in postscript to the subsequent paperback edition of Sir Vidia’s Shadow, and remained close friends until the death of Naipaul in 2018.

His novel Saint Jack (1973) was banned by the government of Singapore for 30 years for casting the country in an unfavorable light. All of Theroux's books were banned by the apartheid government in South Africa, but in 1995 after South Africa's transition to democracy under the presidency of Nelson Mandela, the South African Department of Education made Theroux's The Mosquito Coast required reading for 12th-grade students sitting their final ("Matric") exam.

In 2001, prior to his 60th birthday, Theroux returned to Africa. Despite undergoing various hardships during the trip, he came away with a positive impression of Africa and African people and optimistic views of its future. However, his experiences soured his attitudes towards foreign tourists and activists. He wrote about this journey in the book Dark Star Safari.

Theroux has criticized celebrity activists like Bono, Brad Pitt, and Angelina Jolie as "mythomaniacs, people who wish to convince the world of their worth." He has said that "the impression that Africa is fatally troubled and can be saved only by outside help—not to mention celebrities and charity concerts—is a destructive and misleading conceit".

In an op-ed in The New York Times on October 22, 2016, Theroux recommended that President Obama pardon John Walker Lindh. In the article, he compared his association with rebel ministers and own unwitting involvement while a Peace Corps volunteer in a plot to assassinate President Hastings Banda of Malawi to the complexities in the case of Lindh, who fought with the Taliban in Afghanistan.

== Literary work ==
Theroux published his first novel, Waldo (1967), during his time in Uganda; it was moderately successful. He published several more novels over the next few years, including Fong and the Indians, Jungle Lovers, and The Mosquito Coast. On his return to Malawi many years later, he found that Jungle Lovers, which was set in that country, was still banned. He recounted that in his book Dark Star Safari (2002).

After moving to London in 1972, Theroux set off on an epic journey by train from Great Britain to Japan and back. His account of this journey was published as The Great Railway Bazaar, his first major success as a travel writer and now a classic in the genre.

He has since written a number of travel books, including about traveling by train from Boston to Argentina (The Old Patagonian Express), walking around the United Kingdom (The Kingdom by the Sea), kayaking in the South Pacific (The Happy Isles of Oceania), visiting China (Riding the Iron Rooster), and traveling from Cairo to Cape Town across Africa (Dark Star Safari). In 2015, he published Deep South detailing four road trips through the southern states of the United States. In 2019, he published On the Plain of Snakes, his account of his extensive travels in his own car throughout Mexico. He is noted for his rich descriptions of people and places, laced with a heavy streak of irony. Nonfiction by Theroux includes Sir Vidia's Shadow, an account of his personal and professional friendship with Nobel laureate V. S. Naipaul, which ended abruptly after 30 years.

Theroux has worked extensively with the celebrated photographer Steve McCurry. Their book The Imperial Way appeared in 1987, and McCurry's photographs are included in Theroux's Deep South and On the Plain of Snakes. Magazines such as Smithsonian and The National Geographic have paired Theroux and McCurry on assignments.

A number of Theroux's books have been made into movies. His novella Doctor Slaughter was filmed as Half Moon Street, in 1986, with Michael Caine and Sigourney Weaver. Peter Weir's film The Mosquito Coast (1986) had Harrison Ford, Helen Mirren and River Phoenix in the cast. Theroux's set of short stories The London Embassy became a six-part TV series on British television in 1987. Christmas Snow, a 1986 TV movie starring Sid Caesar, was adapted from Theroux's novel London Snow. Theroux wrote the Hong Kong story on which the Wayne Wang film Chinese Box (1997) was based. In 2019, Apple Films announced that The Mosquito Coast was in production as a 10-part series that was broadcast in 2021.

== Personal life ==
Theroux's 2017 semi-autobiographical novel Mother Land (and earlier related short story in The New Yorker, set in Puerto Rico) refer to an older son born in Puerto Rico in 1961 where his college girlfriend and he had travelled for the birth, giving the baby up for adoption; later, Theroux's son returned into his life.

When Theroux was in Uganda, his friends found him a teaching position at Makerere University in Kampala. There he met Anne Castle, an English graduate student teaching at an upcountry girls' secondary school in Kenya, via Voluntary Service Overseas. They married in 1967. After leaving Asia and Dorset, they moved to south London in 1971, because it was cheaper than the United States. They had two sons: Marcel and Louis, both of whom are writers and documentarians. Theroux and Castle divorced in 1993.

Theroux then married Sheila Donnelly, on November 18, 1995. Donnelly runs a luxury travel/hotel PR agency. They reside in Hawaii and Cape Cod, Massachusetts. Theroux also has a stepson, Brendan Donnelly.

== Select awards and honors ==
Theroux has received numerous awards and honors.

- Fellow, Royal Society of Literature and Royal Geographical Society in UK
- Honorary doctorate in literature from Trinity College in Washington, D.C.
- Honorary doctorate in literature from Tufts University in Medford, Massachusetts
- 1972, 1976, 1977, and 1979: the Playboy Editorial Award for Best Story
- 1977: American Academy and Institute of Arts and Letters award for literature
- 1978: Whitbread Prize for Best Novel – Picture Palace
- 1981: American Book Award nominee – The Old Patagonian Express
- 1981: James Tait Black Memorial Prize – The Mosquito Coast
- 1983: American Book Award nominee – The Mosquito Coast
- 1984: elected to the American Academy of Arts and Letters
- 1989: Thomas Cook Travel Book Award – Riding the Iron Rooster
- 1990: Maria Thomas Fiction Award, lifetime achievement award
- 2015: Patron's Medal from the Royal Geographical Society in UK

== Adaptations ==
- Saint Jack was filmed by director Peter Bogdanovich (1979).
- Doctor Slaughter was adapted as the film Half Moon Street (1986).
- The Mosquito Coast was made into a film of the same name (1986) and a TV series in 2021.
- Chinese Box (1997), a film about the British handover of Hong Kong to the People's Republic of China, credits Theroux as a source for the story, based on themes he explored in his 1997 novel Kowloon Tong.
- A Christmas Card was a radio play dramatized by Nick Warburton and directed by Marilyn Imrie for BBC Radio 4, 29 December 1997.
- The Stranger at the Palazzo D'Oro was a radio play directed by Lu Kemp for BBC Radio 4, 17 December 2004.
