= Peter Jason filmography =

The following is the complete list of the filmography of American actor Peter Jason.

== Film ==
Year	Title	Role	Notes
1970	Rio Lobo	Lt. Ned Forsythe	
1978	The Driver	Commuter	
1979	La ilegal	Police Officer	
1980	The Baltimore Bullet	Bert	
1980	The Long Riders	Pinkerton	
1981	Beyond the Universe	Kent	
1981	Nice Dreams	Detective Drooler	
1981	Texas Lightning	Frank Whitman	
1981	Butterfly	Allen	
1981	Mommie Dearest	Pepsi Executive #4	
1982	Some Kind of Hero	Honcho #1	
1982	Trick or Treats	Malcolm O'Keefe	
1982	48 Hrs.	Torchy's Bartender	
1984	Angel	The John	
1984	Streets of Fire	Harry	
1984	The Karate Kid	Soccer Coach	
1984	Dreamscape	Babcock	
1984	Oxford Blues	Mr. DeAngelo	
1984	Impulse	Man in Truck	
1985	Brewster's Millions	Chuck Fleming	
1985	Eat or Be Eaten	Ambassador	Direct-to-video
1986	Hyper Sapien: People from Another Star	Mr. McAlpin	
1986	Heartbreak Ridge	Major Devin	
1987	Party Camp	Sarge	
1987	Prince of Darkness	Dr. Paul Leahy	
1988	Sunset	Frank Coe	
1988	Red Heat	TV Announcer	
1988	Alien Nation	Fedorchuk	
1988	They Live	Gilbert	
1989	Jack in the Box	Reese	Short film
1989	Johnny Handsome	Mr. Bonet	
1990	The Hunt for Red October	USS Reuben James Commander	Uncredited
1990	Arachnophobia	Coach Henry Beechwood	
1990	Marked for Death	DEA Assistant Director Pete Stone	
1994	In the Mouth of Madness	Mr. Paul	
1995	The Demolitionist	Chief Higgins	
1995	Village of the Damned	Ben Blum	
1995	Congo	Mr. Janus	
1995	Mortal Kombat	Master Boyd	
1995	Rage	Griggs	
1995	Wild Bill	Dave McCandless	
1995	The Adventures of Black Feather	Judge Battle	
1996	Escape from L.A.	Duty Sergeant	
1996	The Glimmer Man	Millie's Father	
1996	Valley Girls	Cop	Short film
1997	Dante's Peak	Councilman Norman Gates	
1997	Java Heads: The Movie		
2000	Finding Kelly	Monte Harrington	
2001	Cahoots	Eddie	
2001	Ghosts of Mars	McSimms	
2002	Hard Cash	The Counter Boss	
2002	The Rose Technique	Detective Atwood	
2002	Undisputed	Oakland TV Announcer	
2002	Invicto	Oakland TV Announcer	
2002	13th Child	Coroner	
2002	Adaptation	Defense Attorney	
2003	Detonator	U.S. Attorney Fred Goldenberg	
2003	Agua Dulce	Walter Tracy	Short film
2003	Seabiscuit	Reporter Max	
2004	Employee of the Month	Bill Gartin	
2004	Hair High	Coach	Voice
2004	Surviving Christmas	Suit	
2005	Confessions of an Action Star		
2005	Frostbite	Colonel Jaffe	Direct-to-video
2005	Kicking & Screaming	Clark	
2006	The Strange Case of Dr. Jekyll and Mr. Hyde	Lt. Hamilton	
2006	The Enigma with a Stigma	Bill Herman	
2007	Moving McAllister	Mr. Robinson	
2007	Richard III	Ringside Announcer	
2008	The Man Who Came Back	The Warden	
2008	Intervention	Chris	Direct-to-video
2008	Milk	Alan Baird	Uncredited
2008	A Woman in the West	Blake	Short film
2009	Falling Up	John O'Shea	
2009	Beaverton	Bob	Short film
2010	How to Make Love to a Woman	Mr. Conners	
2010	The Secret World of Arrietty	Exterminator	Voice, English-language version
2010	Locked In	Super Ray	
2011	Little Murder	Lieutenant Wills	
2011	Ghost of New Orleans	Captain	
2011	Brick Novax's Diary	Skip Michaels / Trip Michaels / Flip Michaels	Short film
2011	From the Head	Jim	
2011	Son of Morning	Ned Jensen	
2011	Valley of the Sun	Myron McGill	
2011	Hopelessly in June	Frankie Flowers	
2012	Heal Thyself	Dennis Hill	Short film
2012	Students Like Us	Dean #1	
2013	Merkin Penal	Sargent Sacrifice	Short film
2013	Queen City	Barry Donovan	
2013	Willow Creek	Ranger Troy Andrews	
2013	Robosapien: Rebooted	Admiral Victor	
2014	Measure	Phinn Garrett	
2014	Cesar Chavez	Almaden Lawyer	Uncredited
2014	Return to Zero	Gerry	
2014	Eiga Doraemon: Shin Nobita no daimakyô	Daburanda	Voice, English-language version
2014	Conjuring Orson	Orson Welles	Short film
2014	Passport	Whip Blackstone	Short film
2015	Welcome to Forever	Spokesman	Short film
2015	The Condo	Clint	
2016	River Guard	Judge Sullivan	
2016	Hail, Caesar!	Director	
2017	The Terror of Hallow's Eve	Dr. Hamilton	
2017	The Nth Ward	Jeffrey	
2017	High & Outside: A Baseball Noir	Harold	
2017	Anywhere, U.S.A.	Earl Norris	Short film
2018	Get Married or Die	Frank	
2018	Jurassic World: Fallen Kingdom	Senator Sherwood	
2018	The Other Side of the Wind	Grover	
2018	Saint Judy	Judge O'Neil	
2018	Daddy Issues	Simon	
2019	Heavenly Deposit	Steven	
2019	The Assent	Father Lambert	
2020	The Downside of Bliss	Mr. James	
2021	Deep in the Forest	Mark Goodman	
2022	We Are Gathered Here Today	Henry Stone	
2022	Combat Radio: A Christmas Carol	Ghost of Christmas Present	Direct-to-video
2022	Tale of 2 Fathers	Grandfather	Short film

== Television ==
Year	Title	Role	Notes
1968	The F.B.I.	Link	Episode: "Homecoming"
1968	Cimarron Strip	David Arlyn / Groom	2 episodes
1968	Judd, for the Defense	Don Daniels	Episode: "Weep the Hunter Home"
1968	Shadow on the Land	Man at Airport	Television film; uncredited
1969	Here Come the Brides	Adam Wilson	Episode: "One to a Customer"
1969	Daniel Boone	Clint Bickford	Episode: "Bickford's Bridge"
1970	Land of the Giants	Mylo	Episode: "The Secret City of Limbo"
1970	The Young Lawyers	Dave Baumgartner	Episode: "The Legacy of Miles Turner"
1970–73	Gunsmoke	Pope / Colt Gentry / Cully Haimes	3 episodes
1971	Hawaii Five-O	Jack Rigney	Episode: "To Kill or Be Killed"
1978	One Day at a Time	Cam Randolph	2 episodes
1979	Starsky & Hutch	Fred Oates	2 episodes
1979	Disaster on the Coastliner	LeBoux	Television film
1980	B. J. and the Bear	Ansel	Episode: "BJ and the Witch"
1980	The Incredible Hulk	Bennett	Episode: "On the Line"
1980	Alcatraz: The Whole Shocking Story	Lieutenant Micklin	Television film
1980–82	Hart to Hart	McCoy / Policeman	2 episodes
1981	Splendor in the Grass	Coach	Television film
1982	Filthy Rich	Tommy Clarkson	Episode: "The Real Men"
1982	Silver Spoons	McConnell	Episode: "The Great Computer Caper"
1982	The Blue and the Gray	Sergeant Ogilvie	Episode: "Part 3"
1982	Cagney & Lacey	Leonard Nolan	Episode: "Recreational Use"
1983	Seven Brides for Seven Brothers	John Cutler	Episode: "Winter Roses"
1983	Starflight: The Plane That Couldn't Land	Schultie	Television film
1984–86	Remington Steele	Martin Rome / Foreman	2 episodes
1984–88	Webster	Kevin / The Coach	2 episodes
1985	A Reason to Live	Dick Biheller	Television film
1985	Cover Up	Ira Loomis	Episode: "Healthy, Wealthy and Dead"
1985	Izzy and Moe	Bartender	Television film
1985	Amazing Stories	Commander	Episode: "The Mission"
1986	The Golden Girls	The Policeman	Episode: "Ladies of the Evening"
1987	Scarecrow and Mrs. King	Brockett	Episode: "Mission of Gold"
1987	The Betty Ford Story	Counselor	Television film
1987	Mickey Spillane's Mike Hammer	Special Agent Cameron	Episode: "A Blinding Fear"
1987	Hard Knocks	Detective	Episode: "Captain Justice"
1987	Billionaire Boys Club	Vince Stoloff	Television film
1987	Laguna Heat	Chief Hanover	Television film
1988	Annie McGuire	Burt	Episode: "The Ferry"
1990	Knots Landing	Security Expert	Episode: "The One to Blame"
1991	Quantum Leap	Kilpatrick	Episode: "Play Ball - August 6, 1961"
1991	Perfect Strangers	Ghost of Chester Bainbridge	Episode: "Fright Night"
1992	Dear John	Bill Conners	Episode: "The Write Stuff"
1992	A Different World	Mr. Schmect	Episode: "Sellmates"
1992	Herman's Head	Fritz	Episode: "Guns 'n' Neurosis"
1992	Afterburn	Colonel Fred Pearson	Television film
1992	Batman: The Animated Series	Mason	Voice, episode: "It's Never Too Late"
1993	The Jackie Thomas Show	Banker Bill Mason	Episode: "Stand up for Bastards"
1993	Roseanne	Jim	Episode: "It Was Twenty Years Ago Today"
1993	Married... with Children	Manager	Episode: "'Tis Time to Smell the Roses"
1993	Body Bags	Gent	Segment: "The Gas Station"
1994	Dr. Quinn, Medicine Woman	Travis Stone	Episode: "Crossing the Line"
1994	Coach	Harry Heftler	Episode: "Coach for a Day: Part 2"
1995	Happily Ever After: Fairy Tales for Every Child	Royal Treasurer	Voice, episode: "The Emperor's New Clothes"
1995	Murder, She Wrote	Vincent Nader	2 episodes
1996	Kung Fu: The Legend Continues	Lou	Episode: "Storm Warning"
1997	The Naked Truth	Senator Wilburn	Episode: "We're at NBC Now"
1997	Pinky and the Brain	Bobby Nacht	Voice, episode: "Hoop Schemes"
1997	Murder One	Mr. Sheehy	Miniseries
1997	Perversions of Science	Priest	Episode: "Dream of Doom"
1997	Women: Stories of Passion	Joan's Husband	Episode: "The Bitter and the Sweet"
1997–98	Mike Hammer, Private Eye	Captain Skip Gleason	26 episodes
1997–98	The New Batman Adventures	Manny / Guard #1 / Cop	Voice, 2 episodes
1998	Air America	Mark McCormick	Episode: "Rebound"
1998–99	Nash Bridges	Frank	3 episodes
1999	Arliss	Marty Polk	Episode: "The Changing of the Guard"
1999	Batman Beyond	Coach Creagar	Voice, episode: "The Winning Edge"
2000–01	Titus	Ridge	2 episodes
2001	JAG	Randy Hamill	Episode: "Miracles"
2001	Out of the Wilderness	Judge Battle	Television film
2001	Providence	Frank Moore	Episode: "Best Man"
2002	Almost a Woman	Mr. Fuller	Television film
2002	Live from Baghdad	Stu	Television film
2003	Jackie Chan Adventures	Farmer MacDonald	Voice, episode: "The Amazing T-Troop"
2003	Carnivàle	Lou Edwards	Episode: "Pick a Number"
2004	Significant Others	Eleanor's Dad	Episode: "A Dad, an Affair & a Blind Date"
2004	Raptor Island	The Captain	Television film
2004	The Perfect Husband: The Laci Peterson Story	Ron Grantski	Television film; uncredited
2004–06	Deadwood	Con Stapleton	26 episodes
2004–13	Arrested Development	Storage Dave / Mr. Jordan	4 episodes
2005	Alien Apocalypse	President Demsky	Television film
2006	The Christmas Card	Uncle Richard	Television film
2006–07	Desperate Housewives	Jeff	2 episodes
2007	Planet Raptor	Sergeant Mathis	Television film
2007	John from Cincinnati	Car Salesman	Episode: "His Visit: Day Nine"
2007	Dirty Sexy Money	Larry Foundry	Episode: "The Game"
2008	Gemini Division	Colonel Black	
2008	Mad Men	Len McKenzie	Episode: "Maidenform"
2009	Castle	Sheriff Sloan	Episode: "A Chill Goes Through Her Veins"
2009	Raising the Bar	Rex	Episode: "Trust Me"
2009	Mending Fences	Hank Bentley	Television film
2009–18	NCIS	SGM Robert King	2 episodes
2010	Cold Case	Charlie Gleason '09 / '10	Episode: "Bullet"
2010	Justified	Owen Carnes	Episode: "The Collection"
2010	Chuck	General Merriweather	Episode: "Chuck Versus the Subway"
2011	Funny or Die Presents	Skip Michaels	3 episodes
2012	CSI: Crime Scene Investigation	Walter Gersh	Episode: "Malice in Wonderland"
2013	1600 Penn	General Harrigan	3 episodes
2014	Scorpion	General Talbertse	Episode: "Talismans"
2015–16	Mixels	Major Nixel / Turg / Wuzzo / Sharx / Tuth	Voice, 2 episodes
2016	Sister Cities	Dr. Timmins	Television film
2017	Longmire	Abel Jenkins	Episode: "The Judas Wolf"
2017–19	Baskets	Uncle Jim	5 episodes
2019	Deadwood: The Movie	Con Stapleton	Television film

== Video games ==
Year	Title	Voice role
1996	Wing Commander IV: The Price of Freedom	Daniel Wilford
1997	Wing Commander: Prophecy	Daniel Wilford
1998	Fallout 2	Sergeant Arch Dornan / Gate Guard
2008	Gears of War 2	Dizzy Wallin / Hanley
2011	Gears of War 3	Dizzy Wallin
