= Kelly Kahl =

American television executive and film producer

- Born: October 20, 1966 (age 59); Burlington, Wisconsin, U.S.
- Education: University of Wisconsin–Madison
- Occupations: Television executive; producer
- Years active: 1990–present
- Known for: President of CBS Entertainment (2017–2022)

Kelly Kahl (born October 20, 1966) is an American television executive and film producer. From 2017 to 2022, he served as the President of Entertainment at CBS.

== Early life and education ==
Kelly Kahl was born in Burlington, Wisconsin to Ronald and Barbara Ann Kahl. He discovered his interest in television while watching Saturday-morning cartoons and noticed programs would change time slots from year to year. He attended Burlington High School, graduating in 1985. He earned a degree in communications from the University of Wisconsin–Madison. He then went on to receive his Master of Arts degree from USC Annenberg School for Communication and Journalism.

== Career ==
Kahl began his career in 1990 at Lorimar Television as a research intern. He then worked at Warner Bros. Television as Director, Network Research before joining CBS as Vice President, Scheduling. While serving in this role he was part of scheduling many successful CBS shows such as Bull, Blue Bloods, The Big Bang Theory, Young Sheldon, CSI, and NCIS. He was instrumental in the green-lighting of the television series Survivor. According to Survivor's host Jeff Probst, Kahl had taken a risk by scheduling Survivor's second season Survivor: The Australian Outback against NBC's Friends. Survivor routinely won viewership against Friends during that season, and as a result, Kahl gained significant influence at CBS that has been used to support Survivor through its 40th season.

He served as executive producer on the films Return to Zero, Sister Cities, and Saint Judy. His favorite CBS shows included SEAL Team, Love Island and Tough as Nails.

On November 16, 2022, CBS announced that Kahl would step down as head of CBS Entertainment at the end of 2022, ending a 26-year career at the network, who announced that Amy Reisenbach would move up from her role as head of current programming to replace him.

In 2025, Kahl served as an executive producer for Just a Bit Outside, a documentary about the Milwaukee Brewers’ 1982 season. Directed and produced by Sean Hanish, the film examines the connection between Milwaukee and its baseball team, which won its only pennant that year before losing to the St. Louis Cardinals in the World Series. The documentary won Best Sports Film at the Louisville International Film Festival and was acquired by Roku, where is set to stream exclusively from April 11 to June 30, 2025.

== Personal life ==
Kahl lives in Hermosa Beach, CA with his wife, Kim and their two dogs, Gracie and Parker. He is a partner at Underground Pub and Grill.
