= Colette Freedman =

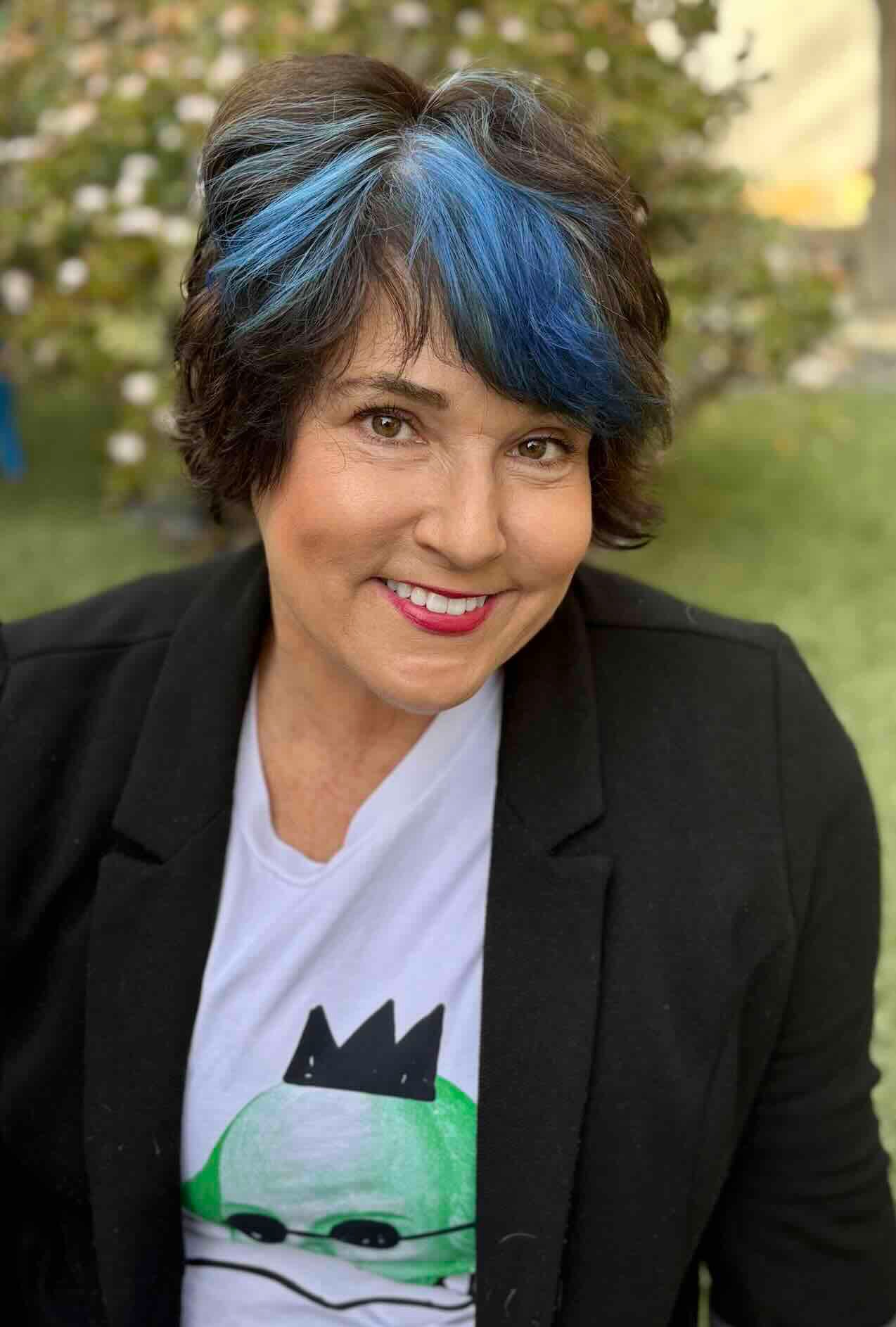
- Born: 19 November 1969; West Point, New York, United States
- Occupations: Playwright, Screenwriter, Novelist, Actress

Colette Freedman (born November 19, 1969) is a playwright, screenwriter, novelist, and actress. She wrote the internationally produced and acclaimed play Sister Cities, which starred Jill Gascoine in its 2008 run at the Edinburgh Fringe Festival. She adapted this play into both a novel and a film of the same name, Sister Cities (2016), featuring Jacki Weaver, Alfred Molina, Stana Katic, Troian Bellisario, Michelle Trachtenberg, Amy Smart and Jess Weixler. She is known for writing indie movies including And Then There Was Eve (2017), which won The Los Angeles Film Festival, and 7,000 Miles (2023) starring Wendie Malick and Juliet Mills.

== Early life ==
Colette Freedman was born in West Point, New York, the daughter of two professors, and grew up in Milwaukee, Wisconsin and Baltimore, Maryland. In Baltimore, she played both field hockey and lacrosse. She was a four-year starter in both sports at Haverford College, where she was honored as both Philadelphia player of the year in Field Hockey and earned All American status in lacrosse. She coached both sports at Colgate University, where she also earned a master's degree, before moving to Los Angeles and pursuing a career as an actress and writer.

== Career ==
=== Writing for the stage ===
Freedman is an internationally produced playwright with over 60 produced plays.

One of her most well-known works is the play Sister Cities, a dark comedy about four estranged sisters–all named after the cities in which they were born– who reunite after their mother's alleged suicide. Called "a masterpiece" (San Jose MET) that is both "heartbreaking and hilarious" (San Jose Stage) and filled with "elements of both Checkhov and sitcom" (Stage Edinburgh) as well as "well honed morbid wit," (Chicago Tribune), it premiered in 2006 and received rave reviews in Los Angeles, New York, and Miami.

After receiving praise as "one of the best new plays of the season" (NYTheatre.com), Sister Cities went on to the 2008 Edinburgh Fringe Festival, starring Jill Gascoine in the role of the family matriarch. Steve Cramer with The Edinburgh Stage wrote, "Colette Freedman's black comedy contrives to constantly amuse with crisp, observant dialogue and nicely tempered performances. It's as much West End fare as Fringe, this is a smart and accomplished piece of drama," while Barry Godron with Edinburgh Evening News promised audiences that Sister Cities would have them "hanging on every word until the final curtain."

Sister Cities has since been produced, around the country and internationally, 31 times including Paris (Une Ville, Une Soeur), Rome (Le Quattro Sorelle) and Australia. Freedman eventually adapted the play into a film (see Screenwriting).

Freedman's musical, Serial Killer Barbie (co-written with Nickella Moschetti) played to sold-out audiences in New Zealand and Los Angeles, where it was called "this season's brightest, bounciest, and crowd-pleasing musical surprise" (Stage Scene LA).

As a Dramaturg, Freedman conceived the story of Mozart: Her Story the Musical, which played at Carnegie Hall and London's Drury Lane Theatre– and which returns to London in 2026. Her musical, BETTIE PAGE, Queen of the Pin Ups, co-written with Tegan Summers, premiered at London's Lyric Theatre in June 2025.

Freedman's other plays include The Affair, Deconstructing the Torah, Ellipses..., Blind Spots, and Iphigenia in Aulis.

With the late International bestselling novelist Jackie Collins, Freedman co-wrote the play, Jackie Collins Hollywood Lies.

=== Screenwriting ===
Freedman is a screenwriter of numerous award-winning independent films. Her Sister Cities (2016), based on the play of the same name, starred Jacki Weaver, Stana Katic, Troian Bellisario, Michelle Trachtenberg, and Jess Weixler and also featured Alfred Molina, Amy Smart, and Tom Everett Scott. Kaia Gerber made her film acting debut playing the younger version of Stana Katic. It was acquired by Lifetime.

In an interview with Channel Guide, Weaver said that when she read the screenplay she "immediately wanted to participate in the film." And when asked about how she got to know the character she played she replied, "The script is so good that everything about the character is there in the text."

Freedman's 2017 film, And Then There Was Eve, co-written with Savannah Bloch, won the LA Film Festival's LA Muse Award for Best Fiction Film. The film stars Tania Nolan as Alyssa, a woman grappling with the loss of her husband while learning to love someone new. Freedman and Bloch (who also directed the film) delayed production to find "the perfect person" to play the lead character, doing a worldwide search and saying they would adapt the script if necessary to fit that person. They said that ultimately, it was about finding the right two people–with just the right chemistry and connection–and found both in Nolan and actress Rachel Crowl.

Freedman's 7,000 Miles (2023) starring Wendie Malick and Juliet Mills, is set in 1977 and follows pilot Jo (Alixzandra Dove) as she returns home to Hawaii to care for her ailing grandmother, Meli, (played by Malick), and begins to suspect that Meli might actually be history's most celebrated aviatrix. The film has garnered numerous awards, including Best Feature (Denali Film Festival), Best Feature Narrative (Gig Harbor Film Festival), Spirit of Independence Award (Fort Lauderdale International Film Festival), Audience Award (Vail Film Festival), and the Lifetime Achievement Award (for Wendie Mallick).

Currently, Freedman is in post-production for her coming of age film, Miles Underwater (co-written with Brooke Purdy) about a thirteen year old who is pathologically afraid of water and must confront the mysteries of his past to save his mother and realize his future.

=== Producing ===
Freedman has produced several independent films including The Seeding (2022), which was a Cleveland International Film Festival Official Selection, and Quality Problems (2017), which won several awards including the Director's Choice Independent Spirit Award at the Sedona International Film Festival, Best Feature Film at the Women Texas Film Festival, The Audience Award at Hell's Half Mile Film and Music Festival, and Best Ensemble Cast at the Jefferson State Flixx Fest.

Freedman is also producing partner in Radical Kindness Productions - a social justice orientated production company. As of September 2025, their films The Colorhouse and Pilgrim (Best Feature Narrative, The Festival of Cinema NYC) are on the festival circuit. Their film, Charlatan is currently in post-production.

In addition to writing and producing independent films, Freedman has written/produced eleven Lifetime thrillers with her writing partner Brooke Purdy. She is also a top Hollywood script doctor and ghostwriter.

=== Books ===
Freedman has authored and co-authored a wide range of books, including a novella, several novels, and a memoir.

Freedman's novella, Tennis Dates (co-written with Hillary Leigh Gross), was released in 2008 and Freedman collaborated with New York Times bestselling author Michael Scott to write The Thirteen Hallows, published in 2011.

Her debut 2013 novel, The Affair (Kensington), told in three parts from three different perspectives (the wife's, the husband's, and the husband's mistress), was featured on NPR's two-minute daily feature, which described Freedman as a "masterful storyteller." Her sequel novel, The Consequences (Kensington), came out January 28, 2014.

Freedman has since gone on to write several more novels, including the YA novel, The Reluctant Fairygodmother (co-written with Kimberly Much), the novel adaptation of her play and film, Sister Cities, and the 2017 futuristic novel, Anomalies (co-written with Sadie Turner). Several prominent actors sang Anomalies's praise, including Randy Jackson, who called it "a fast paced and compelling read which confirms we must fight for what makes us each special and unique." Jason Segel noted Anomalies "leaves you thinking about human nature and what makes us who we are," while Pamela Anderson described it as "a fast paced story which champions individuality and truth."

In 2024, Freedman debuted the novel Tugnutt's Creek (co-written with Nathan Yacos), which has been described as "A Wizard of Oz fever dream," and "A transgressive Alice in Wonderland if Wonderland was filled with woke feminists." Novelist and poet Guadalupe Garcia McCall calls Tugnutt's Creek "an outrageously funny, delightful sardonic social commentary," while novelist Tomas Moniz describes it as "irreverent and playful. A remarkably original, zany ride filled with a wild cast of characters, three-ways, naked tarot card readings and butterflies. The book imagines a bridge to another world, one we'd all be happy to experience."

With Steve Dorff, Freedman co-wrote his 2017 memoir, I Wrote That One Too: A Life In Songwriting From Willie To Whitney, which chronicles Dorff's 25 years as a renowned songwriter of over 20 Top 10 hits for pop and country artists around the world including Barbra Streisand, Celine Dion, Blake Shelton, Smokey Robinson, Kenny Rogers, Ray Charles, Anne Murray, Whitney Houston, George Strait, Dolly Parton, Judy Collins, Cher, Dusty Springfield, Ringo Starr, and Garth Brooks. The book also covers his work as an acclaimed composer of countless scores for television shows and several films, as well as his broadway musical, Josephine.

=== Acting ===
Freedman is also an actress who has performed on the stage and screen. She made a cameo as the prospective house buyer on the penultimate episode of That 70s Show. She originated several roles in her plays and films, including Austin in Sister Cities, Frieda in Blind Spots, Debbi in Quality Problems, Brontë in the film adaptation of Sister Cities, Marnie in And Then There Was Eve, and Dodi, the river god in the upcoming Miles Underwater.

Freedman noted in an interview with her alma mater, Haverford College, that she originally moved to Los Angeles at 24 years old to pursue acting, and that she initially got parts in TV shows, small movies, and plays. However, she quickly became disillusioned by how limited the roles for women in television and film were, stating that "'as a feminist and someone who believes in strong female characters, I was horrified by the roles I was getting." Shortly thereafter, she began writing her own plays–and later, screenplays–in order to create the kind of female roles she felt actresses deserved and that women deserved to see on the screen and stage.

On an episode of Enterprise Radio, Freedman was asked why she thinks women make great writers. She answered, "Women are great listeners. Everyone has stories, but very few people listen to them. And women listen. We're conditioned to listen from the time we're born, and it's a tool that we've developed. We listen, we digest, and then we write."

=== Teaching ===
Freedman currently serves as Dramatic Writing Teaching Faculty at Antioch University's MFA Program. She also teaches screenwriting and playwriting classes at the New York Film Academy, Studio Arts, Rome's Luiss University, China's Sichuan Film and Television University, as well as private coaching.
