= List of awards and nominations received by Alfred Molina =

Alfred Molina awards and nominations
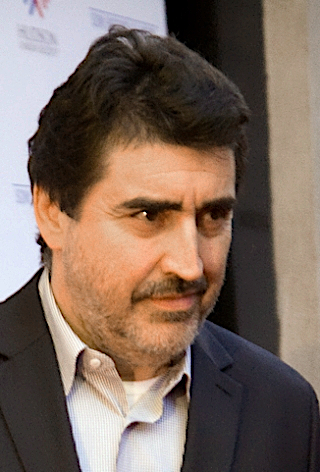
- Molina in 2009
Awards and nominations
Award	Wins	Nominations
Actor Awards	0	4
BAFTA Awards	0	3
Critics Choice	0	3
Emmy Awards	0	2
Golden Globes	0	1
Grammy Awards	0	1
Indie Spirits	0	1
Olivier Awards	0	2
Tony Awards	0	3

Totals (Note: Certain award groups do not simply award one winner. They acknowledge several different recipients, have runners-up, and have third place. Since this is a specific recognition and is different from losing an award, runner-up mentions are considered wins in this award tally. For simplification and to avoid errors, each award in this list has been presumed to have had a prior nomination.)
- Wins: 9
- Nominations: 57

The following is a list of awards and nominations received by Alfred Molina.

Alfred Molina is an English actor known for on stage and screen. He has received numerous award nominations including for four Actor Awards, two British Academy Film Awards, a British Academy Television Award, three Critics Choice Awards, two Primetime Emmy Awards, a Golden Globe Award, a Grammy Award, an Independent Spirit Award, two Laurence Olivier Awards, and a Tony Award.

This includes three Tony Award nominations for his starring roles on the Broadway stage, two for Best Actor in a Play for Yasmina Reza's Art in 1998 and John Logan's Red in 2010 and for Best Actor in a Musical for Fiddler on the Roof in 2004. He received a Drama Desk Award for his performance in Art, and a Drama League Award for Red. He also received two Laurence Olivier Award nominations for his work on the London stage for the musical Oklahoma! in 1988, and David Mamet's play Speed-the-Plow in 1990.

For his performances in film he has received two British Academy Film Award nominations for his performances in Frida (2002), and An Education (2009). He received an Independent Spirit Award nomination for Love is Strange in 2014. He has also received five Screen Actors Guild Award nominations, one as Best Supporting Actor for Frida and four for Outstanding Ensemble Cast in a Motion Picture for Boogie Nights (1997), Magnolia (1999), and Chocolat (2000), and An Education.

For his work on television he was nominated for two Primetime Emmy Awards for Outstanding Supporting Actor in a Limited or Anthology Series or Movie for Ben Weeks in Ryan Murphy's HBO adaptation of The Normal Heart in 2014 and for Robert Aldrich in the FX limited series Feud: Bette and Joan in 2017. He also received a Golden Globe Award nomination for the latter performance.

== Major associations ==
=== Actor Awards ===
Year	Category	Nominated work	Result	Ref.
1997	Outstanding Cast in a Motion Picture	Boogie Nights	Nominated	
1999	Outstanding Cast in a Motion Picture	Magnolia	Nominated	
2000	Outstanding Cast in a Motion Picture	Chocolat	Nominated	
2002	Outstanding Supporting Actor	Frida	Nominated	
2009	Outstanding Cast in a Motion Picture	An Education	Nominated	

=== BAFTA Awards ===
Year	Category	Nominated work	Result	Ref.
British Academy Film Awards
2002	Best Actor in a Supporting Role	Frida	Nominated	
2009	Best Actor in a Supporting Role	An Education	Nominated	
British Academy Television Awards
1990	Best Actor	The Accountant	Nominated	

=== Critics' Choice Awards ===
Year	Category	Nominated work	Result	Ref.
Critics Choice Movie Awards
2002	Best Supporting Actor	Frida	Nominated	
2009	Best Supporting Actor	An Education	Nominated	
Critics' Choice Television Award
2018	Best Supporting Actor in a Movie/Miniseries	Feud: Bette and Joan	Nominated	

=== Emmy Awards ===
Year	Category	Nominated work	Result	Ref.
Primetime Emmy Awards
2014	Outstanding Supporting Actor in a Limited Series or Movie	The Normal Heart	Nominated	
2017	Outstanding Supporting Actor in a Limited Series or Movie	Feud: Bette and Joan	Nominated	

=== Golden Globe Awards ===
Year	Category	Nominated work	Result	Ref.
2017	Best Supporting Actor – Television	Feud: Bette and Joan	Nominated	

=== Grammy Awards ===
Year	Category	Nominated work	Result	Ref.
2001	Best Spoken Word Album	The Complete Shakespeare Sonnets	Nominated	

=== Olivier Awards ===
Year	Category	Nominated work	Result	Ref.
1980	Best Newcomer in a Play	Oklahoma!	Nominated	
1990	Best Comedy Performance	Speed-the-Plow	Nominated	

=== Tony Awards ===
Year	Category	Nominated work	Result	Ref.
1998	Best Actor in a Play	Art	Nominated	
2004	Best Actor in a Musical	Fiddler on the Roof	Nominated	
2010	Best Actor in a Play	Red	Nominated	

== Critics awards ==
Year	Award	Category	Nominated work	Result	Ref.
2004	London Film Critics' Circle	British Supporting Actor	Spider-Man 2	Won	
2007	London Film Critics' Circle	Best Supporting Actor	The Hoax	Nominated	
2009	London Film Critics' Circle	British Supporting Actor of the Year	An Education	Nominated	
1997	Florida Film Critics Circle	Best Cast	Boogie Nights	Won	
1999	Florida Film Critics Circle	Best Cast	Magnolia	Won	
2002	Chicago Film Critics Association	Best Supporting Actor	Frida	Nominated	
2009	Dallas–Fort Worth Film Critics Association	Best Supporting Actor	An Education	Nominated	
2009	Washington D.C. Film Critics Association	Best Supporting Actor	An Education	Nominated	
2009	Vancouver Film Critics Circle	Best Supporting Actor	An Education	Nominated	
2014	Dallas–Fort Worth Film Critics Association	Best Supporting Actor	Love Is Strange	Nominated	

== Theatre awards ==
=== Drama Desk Awards ===
Year	Category	Nominated work	Result	Ref.
1998	Featured Actor in a Play	'Art'	Won	
2004	Outstanding Actor in a Musical	Fiddler on the Roof	Nominated	
2010	Best Actor in a Play	Red	Nominated	

=== Drama League Awards ===
Year	Category	Nominated work	Result	Ref.
2010	Distinguished Performance	Red	Won	

=== Theatre World Award ===
Year	Category	Nominated work	Result	Ref.
1996	Theatre World Award	Molly Sweeney	Won	

== Miscellaneous awards ==
Year	Award	Category	Nominated work	Result	Ref.
1990	Royal Television Society Award	Best Actor – Male	The Accountant	Won	
2003	Imagen Award	Best Actor – Film	Frida	Won	
2003	Satellite Award	Best Supporting Actor	Frida	Nominated	
2005	Visual Effects Society Award	Outstanding Actor - Visual Effects Film	Spider-Man 2	Won	
2005	Satellite Award	Best Supporting Actor	Spider-Man 2	Nominated	
2005	Saturn Award	Best Supporting Actor	Spider-Man 2	Nominated	
2005	Teen Choice Award	Choice Movie Villain	Spider-Man 2	Nominated	
2005	MTV Movie Award	Best Villain	Spider-Man 2	Nominated	
2009	ALMA Award	Best Actor in Film	The Pink Panther 2	Nominated	
2009	British Independent Film Award	Best Supporting Actor	An Education	Nominated	
2009	Satellite Award	Best Supporting Actor	An Education	Nominated	
2014	Independent Spirit Award	Best Supporting Actor	Love Is Strange	Nominated	
2022	Saturn Award	Best Supporting Actor	Spider-Man: No Way Home	Nominated	
2024	Broadway.com Audience Award	Favorite Featured Actor in a Play	Uncle Vanya	Nominated	
