= Anita Brandt-Burgoyne =

American film editor

- Occupation: Film editor
- Years active: 1981–present

Anita Brandt-Burgoyne is an American film editor.

== Filmography ==
Editor
Year	Film	Director	Notes
1995	Payback	Anthony Hickox	
1995	A Kid in King Arthur's Court	Michael Gottlieb	
1996	A Very Brady Sequel	Arlene Sanford	First collaboration with Arlene Sanford
1996	Crossworlds	Krishna Rao	
1997	Good Burger	Brian Robbins	
1998	All I Wanna Do	Sarah Kernochan	
1998	I'll Be Home for Christmas	Arlene Sanford	Second collaboration with Arlene Sanford
2000	The Intern	Michael Lange	
2001	Legally Blonde	Robert Luketic	
2004	Confessions of a Teenage Drama Queen	Sara Sugarman	
2005	Looking for Comedy in the Muslim World	Albert Brooks	
2006	Park	Kurt Voelker	First collaboration with Kurt Voelker
2006	Bonneville	Christopher N. Rowley	
2008	My Sassy Girl	Yann Samuell	
2011	A Good Old Fashioned Orgy	Alex Gregory; Peter Huyck	
2012	That's What She Said	Carrie Preston	
2014	Return to Zero	Sean Hanish	First collaboration with Sean Hanish
2014	Campin' Buddies	Tom Logan	
2017	The Bachelors	Kurt Voelker	Second collaboration with Kurt Voelker
2018	Saint Judy	Sean Hanish	Second collaboration with Sean Hanish
2019	Wish Man	Theo Davies	
2019	Falling Inn Love	Roger Kumble	First collaboration with Roger Kumble
2020	After We Collided	Roger Kumble	Second collaboration with Roger Kumble
2022	Honor Society	Oran Zegman	
2023	Choose Love	Stuart McDonald	

Editorial department
Year	Film	Director	Role
1981	Wolfen	Michael Wadleigh	Apprentice editor
1982	I'm Dancing as Fast as I Can	Jack Hofsiss	Apprentice editor
1983	Touched	John Flynn	Second assistant editor
1983	Smokey and the Bandit Part 3	Dick Lowry	Apprentice editor
1986	9½ Weeks	Adrian Lyne	Assistant editor
1987	The Big Town	Ben Bolt	Assistant editor: USA
1988	The Great Outdoors	Howard Deutch	Assistant editor
2011	Leave It on the Floor	Sheldon Larry	Additional editor

Thanks
Year	Film	Director	Role
2011	High Low	Kevin Hotalen	Special thanks
2022	Always, Lola	Jeffrey Crane Graham	Special thanks

Direct-to-video films

Editor
Year	Film	Director
2001	Skeletons in the Closet	Wayne Powers

Direct-to-video shorts

Editor
Year	Film	Director
2011	Tamale Lesson	Jeremy Kagan

Documentaries

Editor
Year	Film	Director
2008	A Celebration of Women Directors	Laurie Agard; Drew Ann Rosenberg

Shorts

Editor
Year	Film	Director
2011	A Hidden Agender	Tracie Laymon
2013	Conversando entre tamales	Jeremy Kagan
2013	Tamale Lesson	Jeremy Kagan
2018	Mixed Signals	Tracie Laymon
2020	Ghosted	Tracie Laymon

TV movies

Editor
Year	Film	Director
1988	In the Line of Duty: The F.B.I. Murders	Dick Lowry
1989	Unconquered	Dick Lowry
1990	Miracle Landing	Dick Lowry
1990	Archie: To Riverdale and Back Again	Dick Lowry
1990	In the Line of Duty: A Cop for the Killing	Dick Lowry
1991	In the Line of Duty: Manhunt in the Dakotas	Dick Lowry
1991	Dead on the Money	Mark Cullingham
1991	The Gambler Returns: The Luck of the Draw	Dick Lowry
1992	A Woman Scorned: The Betty Broderick Story	Dick Lowry
1992	In the Line of Duty: Street War	Dick Lowry
1992	Her Final Fury: Betty Broderick, the Last Chapter	Dick Lowry
1993	Telling Secrets	Marvin J. Chomsky
1993	In the Line of Duty: Ambush in Waco	Dick Lowry
1994	Dangerous Heart	Michael M. Scott
1994	One More Mountain	Dick Lowry
1995	Letter to My Killer	Janet Meyers
1999	A Murder on Shadow Mountain	Dick Lowry
2002	Cadet Kelly	Larry Shaw
2003	Homeless to Harvard: The Liz Murray Story	Peter Levin
2003	Stealing Christmas	Gregg Champion
2005	Vinegar Hill	Peter Werner
2008	Queen Sized	Peter Levin
2009	12 Men of Christmas	Arlene Sanford
2010	Amish Grace	Gregg Champion
2011	A Fairly Odd Movie: Grow Up, Timmy Turner!	Savage Steve Holland
2011	Innocent	Mike Robe
2011	Good Luck Charlie, It's Christmas!	Arlene Sanford
2012	A Fairly Odd Christmas	Savage Steve Holland
2013	Swindle	Jonathan Judge
2013	Jinxed	Stephen Herek
2014	The Gabby Douglas Story	Gregg Champion
2019	Bixler High Private Eye	Leslie Kolins Small
2021	A Loud House Christmas	Jonathan Judge

Editorial department
Year	Film	Director	Role
1982	Miss All-American Beauty	Gus Trikonis	Apprentice editor
1983	Kenny Rogers as The Gambler: The Adventure Continues	Dick Lowry	Assistant film editor
1984	Flight 90: Disaster on the Potomac	Robert Michael Lewis	Assistant editor
1989	Amityville 4: The Evil Escapes	Sandor Stern	Assistant editor

TV series

Editor
Year	Title	Notes
1989	Hard Time on Planet Earth	1 episode
1995	Extreme	1 episode
1999−2000	Judging Amy	10 episodes
2002	For the People	1 episode
2003	Out of Order	6 episodes
2015−16	The Kicks	10 episodes
2016	Recovery Road	4 episodes
2017	Star	3 episodes
2020	Matched	—N/a
