= Satellite Award for Best Television Film =

Retired annual television award

- Awarded for: Best Television Film
- Country: United States
- Presented by: International Press Academy
- First award: 1999
- Currently held by: Weird: The Al Yankovic Story (2022)

The Satellite Award for Best Film Made for Television was one of the annual Satellite Awards given by the International Press Academy. In 2016, the IPA merged the TV miniseries and film categories.

== Winners and nominees ==
=== 1990s ===
| Year | Winners and nominees | Director | Network(s) |
|---|---|---|---|
| 1999 | Strange Justice | Ernest R. Dickerson | Showtime |
| 1999 | Introducing Dorothy Dandridge | Martha Coolidge | HBO |
| 1999 | A Lesson Before Dying | Joseph Sargent | HBO |
| 1999 | RKO 281 | Benjamin Ross | HBO |
| 1999 | A Slight Case of Murder | Steven Schachter | TNT |

=== 2000s ===
| Year | Winners and nominees | Director | Network(s) |
|---|---|---|---|
| 2000 | Harlan County War | Tony Bill | Showtime |
| 2000 | Cheaters | John McCalmont | Syndication |
| 2000 | Dirty Pictures | Frank Pierson | Showtime |
| 2000 | For Love or Country: The Arturo Sandoval Story | Joseph Sargent | HBO |
| 2000 | Nuremberg | Yves Simoneau | TNT |
| 2001 | The Day Reagan Was Shot | Cyrus Nowrasteh | Showtime |
| 2001 | Conspiracy | Frank Pierson | HBO |
| 2001 | Midwives | Glenn Jordan | Lifetime |
| 2001 | Varian's War | Lionel Chetwynd | Showtime |
| 2001 | Wild Iris | Daniel Petrie | Showtime |
| 2001 | Wit | Mike Nichols | HBO |
| 2002 | Door to Door | Steven Schachter | TNT |
| 2002 | The Gathering Storm | Richard Loncraine | HBO |
| 2002 | Keep the Faith, Baby | Doug McHenry | Showtime |
| 2002 | The Laramie Project | Moisés Kaufman | HBO |
| 2002 | Path to War | John Frankenheimer | HBO |
| 2003 | Rudy: The Rudy Giuliani Story | Robert Dornhelm | USA Network |
| 2003 | And Starring Pancho Villa as Himself | Bruce Beresford | HBO |
| 2003 | My House in Umbria | Richard Loncraine | HBO |
| 2003 | Normal | Jane Anderson | HBO |
| 2003 | Our Town | James Naughton | PBS |
| 2003 | Soldier's Girl | Frank Pierson | Showtime |
| 2004 | Redemption: The Stan Tookie Williams Story | Vondie Curtis-Hall | FX |
| 2004 | Helter Skelter | John Gray | CBS |
| 2004 | Iron Jawed Angels | Katja von Garnier | HBO |
| 2004 | The Life and Death of Peter Sellers | Stephen Hopkins | HBO |
| 2004 | Something the Lord Made | Joseph Sargent | HBO |
| 2005 | Reefer Madness | Andy Fickman | Showtime |
| 2005 | Kidnapped | Brendan Maher | BBC |
| 2005 | Lackawanna Blues | George C. Wolfe | HBO |
| 2005 | The Magic of Ordinary Days | Brent Shields | CBS |
| 2005 | Our Fathers | Dan Curtis | Showtime |
| 2005 | Sometimes in April | Raoul Peck | HBO |
| 2005 | Warm Springs | Joseph Sargent | HBO |
| 2006 | A Little Thing Called Murder | Richard Benjamin | Lifetime |
| 2006 | Gideon's Daughter | Stephen Poliakoff | BBC America |
| 2006 | High School Musical | Kenny Ortega | Disney Channel |
| 2006 | In from the Night | Peter Levin | CBS |
| 2006 | Mrs. Harris | Phyllis Nagy | HBO |
| 2007 | Mitch Albom's For One More Day | Lloyd Kramer | ABC |
| 2007 | Bury My Heart At Wounded Knee | Yves Simoneau | HBO |
| 2007 | Life Support | Nelson George | HBO |
| 2007 | Longford | Tom Hooper | HBO |
| 2007 | The Trial of Tony Blair | Simon Cellan Jones | Channel 4 |
| 2007 | The Wind in the Willows | Rachel Talalay | PBS |
| 2008 | Filth: The Mary Whitehouse Story | Andy DeEmmony | BBC |
| 2008 | 24: Redemption | Jon Cassar | Fox |
| 2008 | Bernard and Doris | Bob Balaban | HBO |
| 2008 | God on Trial | Andy DeEmmony | PBS |
| 2008 | The Memory Keeper's Daughter | Mick Jackson | Lifetime |
| 2008 | Recount | Jay Roach | HBO |
| 2009 | Grey Gardens | Michael Sucsy | HBO |
| 2009 | The Courageous Heart of Irena Sendler | John Kent Harrison | CBS |
| 2009 | Endgame | Pete Travis | PBS |
| 2009 | Into the Storm | Thaddeus O'Sullivan | HBO |
| 2009 | Loving Leah | Jeff Bleckner | CBS |
| 2009 | Taking Chance | Ross Katz | HBO Films |

=== 2010s ===
| Year | Winners and nominees | Director | Network(s) |
|---|---|---|---|
| 2010 | Temple Grandin | Mick Jackson | HBO |
| 2010 | The Diary of Anne Frank | Jon Jones | BBC One |
| 2010 | The Special Relationship | Richard Loncraine | HBO, BBC Two |
| 2010 | When Love Is Not Enough: The Lois Wilson Story | John Kent Harrison | CBS |
| 2010 | You Don't Know Jack | Barry Levinson | HBO |
| 2014 | Return to Zero | Sean Hanish | Lifetime |
| 2014 | The Gabby Douglas Story | Gregg Champion | Lifetime |
| 2014 | The Normal Heart | Ryan Murphy | HBO |
| 2014 | The Trip to Bountiful | Peter Masterson | Lifetime |
| 2014 | Turks & Caicos | David Hare | BBC, PBS |
| 2015 | Stockholm, Pennsylvania | Nikole Beckwith | Lifetime |
| 2015 | Killing Jesus | Christopher Menaul | National Geographic Channel |
| 2015 | Nightingale | Elliott Lester | HBO |
| 2015 | Bessie | Dee Rees | HBO |
| 2017 | The Wizard of Lies | Barry Levinson | HBO |
| 2017 | King Charles III | Rupert Goold | BBC, PBS |
| 2017 | The Immortal Life of Henrietta Lacks | George C. Wolfe | HBO |
| 2017 | To Walk Invisible: The Bronte Sisters | Sally Wainwright | Netflix |
| 2017 | War Machine | David Michôd | HBO |
| 2018 | The Tale | Jennifer Fox | HBO |
| 2018 | Cargo | Ben Howling; Yolanda Ramke | Netflix |
| 2018 | Her Only Choice | Christel Gibson | BET |
| 2018 | King Lear | Richard Eyre | Amazon Studios; BBC |
| 2019 | El Camino: A Breaking Bad Movie | Vince Gilligan | Netflix |
| 2019 | Brexit: The Uncivil War | Toby Haynes | HBO |
| 2019 | Deadwood: The Movie | Daniel Minahan | HBO |
| 2019 | The Highwaymen | John Lee Hancock | Netflix |

=== 2020s ===
| Year | Winners and nominees | Director | Network(s) |
|---|---|---|---|
| 2020 | The Clark Sisters: First Ladies of Gospel | Christine Swanson | Lifetime |
| 2020 | Bad Education | Cory Finley | HBO |
| 2020 | Sylvie's Love | Eugene Ashe | Amazon Prime Video |
| 2020 | Uncle Frank | Alan Ball | Amazon Prime Video |
| 2021 | Oslo | Bartlett Sher | HBO |
| 2021 | Help | Marc Munden | Channel 4 |
| 2021 | Robin Roberts Presents: Mahalia | Kenny Leon | Lifetime |
| 2022 | Weird: The Al Yankovic Story | Eric Appel | The Roku Channel |
| 2022 | Fresh | Mimi Cave | Hulu |
| 2022 | Operation Mincemeat | John Madden | Netflix |
| 2022 | Rescued by Ruby | Katt Shea | Netflix |
| 2022 | The Survivor | Barry Levinson | HBO |
