= Dallas–Fort Worth Film Critics Association Award for Best Supporting Actor =

Annual US film award

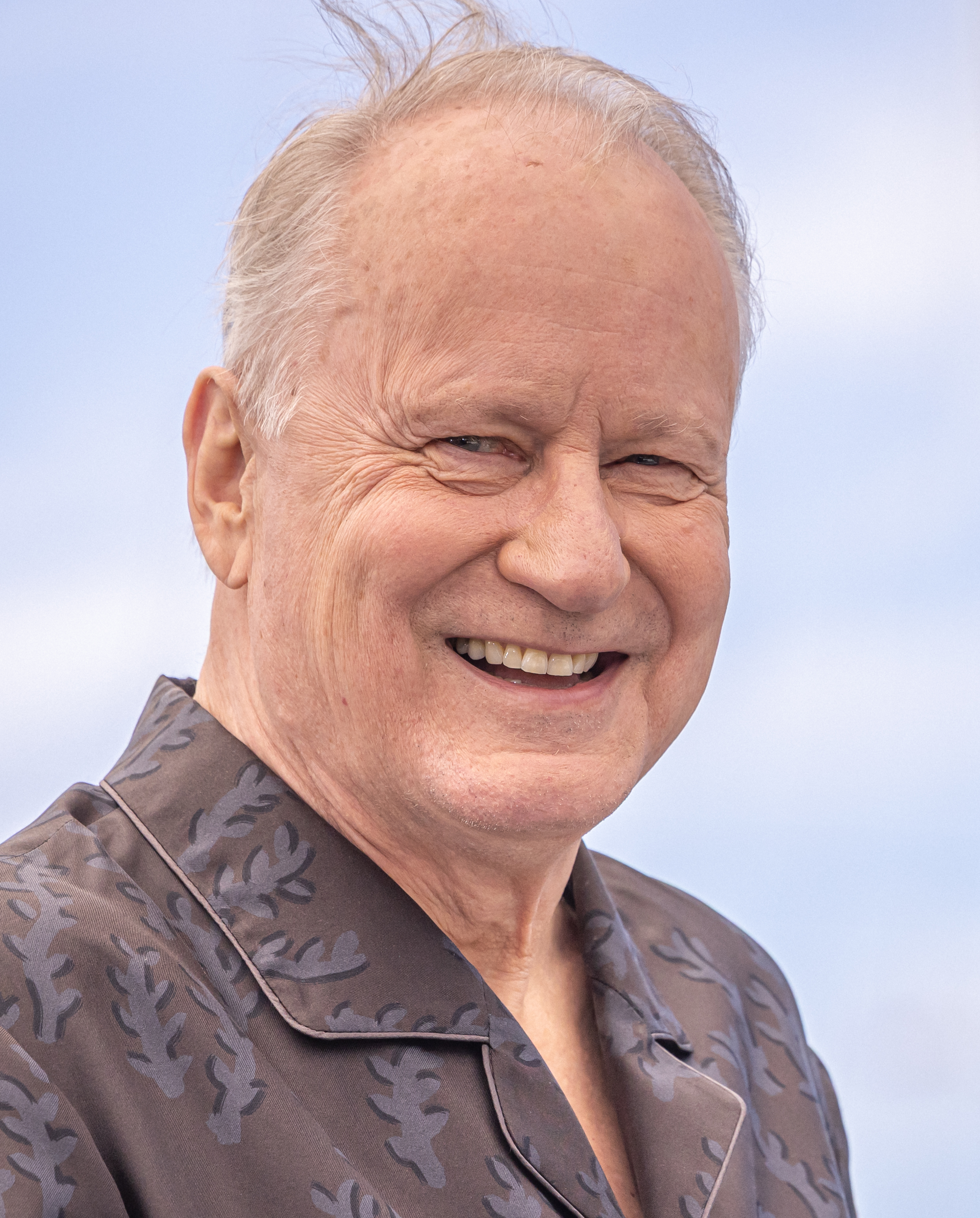
- The 2025 recipient: Stellan Skarsgård
- Awarded for: Best Performance by an Actor in a Supporting Role
- Country: United States
- Presented by: Dallas–Fort Worth Film Critics Association
- First award: Joe Pesci; Goodfellas (1990)
- Currently held by: Stellan Skarsgård; Sentimental Value (2025)
- Website: dfwcritics.com

The Dallas–Fort Worth Film Critics Association Award for Best Supporting Actor is an award presented by the Dallas–Fort Worth Film Critics Association. It is given in honor of an actor who has delivered an outstanding performance in a supporting role.

== Winners ==
- † = Winner of the Academy Award for Best Supporting Actor

Winners are in bold.

=== 1990s ===
Year	Winner	Film	Role
1990	**Joe Pesci** †	Goodfellas	Tommy DeVito
1991	**Tommy Lee Jones**	JFK	Clay Shaw / Clay Bertrand
1992	**Gene Hackman** †	Unforgiven	Little Bill Daggett
1993	**Ralph Fiennes**	Schindler's List	Amon Göth
1994	**Martin Landau** †	Ed Wood	Bela Lugosi
1995	**Kevin Spacey** †	The Usual Suspects	Roger "Verbal" Kint
1996	**Cuba Gooding Jr.** †	Jerry Maguire	Rodney "Rod" Tidwell
1997	**Burt Reynolds**	Boogie Nights	Jack Horner
1998	**Billy Bob Thornton**	A Simple Plan	Jacob Mitchell
1999	**Haley Joel Osment**	The Sixth Sense	Cole Sear

=== 2000s ===
Year	Winner	Film	Role
2000	**Albert Finney**	Erin Brockovich	Edward L. Masry
2001	**Ben Kingsley**	Sexy Beast	Don Logan
2002	**Chris Cooper** †	Adaptation.	John Laroche
2003	**Alec Baldwin**	The Cooler	Sheldon "Shelly" Kaplow
2004	**Thomas Haden Church**	Sideways	Jack Cole
2005	**Matt Dillon**	Crash	Sgt. John Ryan
2006	**Jackie Earle Haley**	Little Children	Ronald James McGorvey
2007	**Javier Bardem** †	No Country for Old Men	Anton Chigurh
2008	**Heath Ledger** (posthumous) †	The Dark Knight	The Joker
2009	**Christoph Waltz** †	**Inglourious Basterds**	**Col. Hans Landa**
2009	Woody Harrelson	The Messenger	Captain Tony Stone
2009	Stanley Tucci	The Lovely Bones	George Harvey
2009	Alfred Molina	An Education	Jack Mellor
2009	Christian McKay	Me and Orson Welles	Orson Welles

=== 2010s ===
Year	Winner	Film	Role
2010	**Christian Bale** †	**The Fighter**	**Dicky Eklund**
2010	Geoffrey Rush	The King's Speech	Lionel Logue
2010	Jeremy Renner	The Town	James "Jem" Coughlin
2010	Bill Murray	Get Low	Frank Quinn
2010	Chris Cooper	The Company Men	Phil Woodward
2011	**Christopher Plummer** †	**Beginners**	**Hal Fields**
2011	Albert Brooks	Drive	Bernie Rose
2011	Max von Sydow	Extremely Loud and Incredibly Close	The Renter
2011	Armie Hammer	J. Edgar	Clyde Tolson
2011	Kenneth Branagh	My Week with Marilyn	Laurence Olivier
2012	**Tommy Lee Jones**	**Lincoln**	**Thaddeus Stevens**
2012	Philip Seymour Hoffman	The Master	Lancaster Dodd
2012	Christoph Waltz †	Django Unchained	Dr. King Schultz
2012	Alan Arkin	Argo	Lester Siegel
2012	Robert De Niro	Silver Linings Playbook	Patrizio "Pat" Solitano Sr.
2013	**Jared Leto** †	**Dallas Buyers Club**	**Rayon**
2013	Michael Fassbender	12 Years a Slave	Edwin Apps
2013	Barkhad Abdi	Captain Phillips	Abduwali Muse
2013	Daniel Bruhl	Rush	Niki Lauda
2013	Jonah Hill	The Wolf of Wall Street	Donnie Azoff
2014	**J. K. Simmons** †	**Whiplash**	**Terence Fletcher**
2014	Edward Norton	Birdman	Mike Shiner
2014	Ethan Hawke	Boyhood	Mason Evans Sr.
2014	Mark Ruffalo	Foxcatcher	Dave Schultz
2014	Alfred Molina	Love Is Strange	George Garea
2015	**Paul Dano**	**Love & Mercy**	**Brian Wilson**
2015	Mark Rylance †	Bridge of Spies	Rudolf Abel
2015	Tom Hardy	The Revenant	John S. Fitzgerald
2015	Idris Elba	Beasts of No Nation	Commandant
2015	Benicio del Toro	Sicario	Alejandro Gillick
2016	**Mahershala Ali** †	**Moonlight**	**Juan**
2016	Jeff Bridges	Hell or High Water	Texas Ranger Marcus Hamilton
2016	Michael Shannon	Nocturnal Animals	Detective Bobby Andes
2016	Lucas Hedges	Manchester by the Sea	Patrick Chandler
2016	Ben Foster	Hell or High Water	Tanner Howard
2017	**Sam Rockwell** †	**Three Billboards Outside Ebbing, Missouri**	**Officer Jason Dixon**
2017	Willem Dafoe	The Florida Project	Bobby Hicks
2017	Richard Jenkins	The Shape of Water	Giles
2017	Armie Hammer	Call Me By Your Name	Oliver
2017	Woody Harrelson	Three Billboards Outside Ebbing, Missouri	Bill Willoughby
2018	**Mahershala Ali** †	**Green Book**	**Don Shirley**
2018	Richard E. Grant	Can You Ever Forgive Me?	Jack Hock
2018	Sam Elliott	A Star Is Born	Bobby Maine
2018	Timothee Chalamet	Beautiful Boy	Nicolas "Nic" Sheff
2018	Michael B. Jordan	Black Panther	N'Jadaka/Erik "Killmonger" Stevens
2019	**Brad Pitt** †	**Once Upon a Time in Hollywood**	**Cliff Booth**
2019	Willem Dafoe	The Lighthouse	Thomas Wake
2019	Joe Pesci	The Irishman	Russell Bufalino
2019	Al Pacino	The Irishman	Jimmy Hoffa
2019	Shia LaBeouf	Honey Boy	James Lort

=== 2020s ===
Year	Winner	Film	Role
2020	**Daniel Kaluuya** †	**Judas and the Black Messiah**	**Fred Hampton**
2020	Leslie Odom Jr.	One Night in Miami	Sam Cooke
2020	Sacha Baron Cohen	The Trial of the Chicago 7	Abbie Hoffman
2020	Bill Murray	On the Rocks	Felix Keane
2020	Paul Raci	Sound of Metal	Joe
2021	**Kodi Smit-McPhee**	**The Power Of The Dog**	**Peter Gordon**
2021	Troy Kotsur †	CODA	Frank Rossi
2021	Ciaran Hinds	Belfast	Pop
2021	Ben Affleck	The Tender Bar	Charlie Maguire
2021	Jesse Plemons	The Power Of The Dog	George Burbank
2022	**Ke Huy Quan** †	**Everything Everywhere All At Once**	**Waymond Wang**
2022	Brendan Gleeson	Banshees of Inisherin	Colm Doherty
2022	Paul Dano	The Fabelmans	Burt Fabelman
2022	Brian Tyree Henry	Causeway	James Aucoin
2022	Ben Whishaw	Women Talking	August
2023	**Robert Downey Jr.** †	**Oppenheimer**	**Lewis Strauss**
2023	Charles Melton	May December	Joe Yoo
2023	Robert De Niro	Killers of the Flower Moon	William King Hale
2023	Mark Ruffalo	Poor Things	Duncan Wedderburn
2023	Dominic Sessa	The Holdovers	Angus Tully
2024	**Guy Pearce**	**The Brutalist**	**Harrison Lee Van Buren**
2024	Kieran Culkin †	A Real Pain	Benji
2024	Edward Norton	A Complete Unknown	Pete Seeger
2024	Denzel Washington	Gladiator II	Marcinus
2024	Clarence Maclin	Sing Sing	Himself
2025	**Stellan Skarsgård**	**Sentimental Value**	**Gustav Borg**
2025	Benicio del Toro	One Battle After Another	Sensei Sergio St. Carlos
2025	Sean Penn †	One Battle After Another	Col. Steven J. Lockjaw
2025	Paul Mescal	Hamnet	William Shakespeare
2025	Adam Sandler	Jay Kelly	Ron Sukenick
