= Roger & Val Have Just Got In =

British television series

- Genre: Sitcom
- Written by: Emma Kilcoyne; Beth Kilcoyne; Dawn French
- Starring: Dawn French; Alfred Molina
- Opening theme: "Come Softly to Me" by The Fleetwoods
- Country of origin: United Kingdom
- Original language: English
- No. of series: 2
- No. of episodes: 12 (list of episodes)

Production
- Executive producer: Dawn French
- Running time: 30 minutes

Original release
- Network: BBC Two
- Release: 6 August 2010 – 14 March 2012

Roger & Val Have Just Got In is a British sitcom that stars Dawn French and Alfred Molina playing married couple Roger and Val Stephenson. The show premiered on BBC Two on 6 August 2010 and six episodes were broadcast for the first series. The show was created by Dawn French, directed by Jamie Rafn, and written by Beth Kilcoyne and Emma Kilcoyne.

Each episode is set in the half-hour after Roger and Val arrive home from work. Episodes play out in real time without a laugh track.

In May 2011, French was nominated for a BAFTA for her role as Val.

The series was briefly available on the Netflix platform in the UK.

== Plot ==
Dawn French and Alfred Molina star in this comedy series focusing on the everyday, seemingly trivial trials and tribulations faced by a middle-aged married couple. The bittersweet comedy looks at how they get on in the first half-hour after walking through their front door. It is set in the fictional area of 'Southmoor', in the south of Bristol.

== Production ==
Six episodes were produced for the first series by the BBC. The show was created by Dawn French, the director was Jamie Rafn and the writers were Beth Kilcoyne and Emma Kilcoyne. A further six episodes were also produced for the BBC for 2012.

== Episode list ==
=== Series 1 (2010) ===
| No. overall | No. in series | Title | Directed by | Original release date | Viewers (millions) |
|---|---|---|---|---|---|
| 1 | 1 | "The Guarantee" | Jamie Rafn | 6 August 2010 | 1.71 million |
The opening episode explores the Roger and Val looking for a Hoover guarantee so they can return it to the shop and get a refund. It takes the whole episode just to find it but when they eventually do find it, Val is so happy, she tears it up by mistake and in the last few minutes of the episode, we see Val cooking the tea and Roger with sellotape sticking the pieces of the guarantee back together.
| 2 | 2 | "The Unglamorous Row" | Jamie Rafn | 13 August 2010 | 1.23 million |
Val comes home to find Roger in an agitated state. She has left that evening's meal, a pack of fish fingers and some frozen peas, in his plant fridge in the conservatory. Thus begins a chain of rows, each one seemingly all about fish fingers. Despite various attempts by both parties to smooth things over, there is a certain amount of tension in the air. It transpires that Roger is in a foul mood not because of the fish fingers, but because there are two new water voles at work who don't get on, and staff have named them after Roger and his boss Phil.
| 3 | 3 | "The Dining Room Curtains" | Jamie Rafn | 20 August 2010 | 1.09 million |
Roger's father is critically ill in hospital. Meanwhile, there's the job of re-hanging the freshly laundered dining room curtains - courtesy of Year 9 - in the newly painted dining room. Top of the agenda, however, is putting on the kettle and unwinding with a cup of tea and a snack. In typical fashion, one scotch pancake leads to another and, with the pressing need to generally put the world to rights, will either of them have the energy for household chores?
| 4 | 4 | "Be Our Guests" | Jamie Rafn | 27 August 2010 | 1.16 million |
Roger's dad is close to death. Roger's cousin Cathy is arriving with her husband so that she can say her farewells. Roger and Val find themselves under pressure to get the spare room ready for their stay. Things become too much for Roger.
| 5 | 5 | "Reply All" | Jamie Rafn | 3 September 2010 | 1.14 million |
Roger lies almost mute in bed in the spare room. Val tries hard to reach him, but there's more to this crisis than the recent news about his father. Roger reveals that, alone in the house, he has followed grief counselling advice and written out an idealised self-image; however he has mistakenly emailed it to his management team at work. Hideously embarrassed, he and Val try to salvage the situation, but it leads to a terrible and definite schism between them. For the first time in the series, someone leaves the house.
| 6 | 6 | "The Valerie Step" | Jamie Rafn | 10 September 2010 | n/a |
Val is curious to find out how Roger's work tribunal has gone but, following recent events, relations between the two of them are less than easy.

=== Series 2 (2012) ===
| No. overall | No. in series | Title | Directed by | Original release date | Viewers (millions) |
|---|---|---|---|---|---|
| 1 | 7 | "A Shock" | Mandie Fletcher | 8 February 2012 | n/a |
Val shows Roger her novel way of overcoming interview nerves with a little help from her friends. Meanwhile, among the weekend's post is a hand-delivered note for Roger that will change every aspect of their world and shatter the balance they have worked so hard to achieve.
| 2 | 8 | "The Woman in the Attic" | Mandie Fletcher | 15 February 2012 | n/a |
It is World Book Day at Val's school, an excellent opportunity to further her deputy headship campaign while dressed as Mrs Danvers. A fellow teacher has given Val a plastic toy to give Roger good luck, but it seems to be strangely multiplying itself inside the house. Meanwhile, a message on Roger's Facebook support group threatens to bring his major misdemeanour to Val's attention.
| 3 | 9 | "Surprise!" | Mandie Fletcher | 22 February 2012 | n/a |
A verdict leads to a meal, and an email leads to a confession.
| 4 | 10 | "Pam's Collage" | Mandie Fletcher | 29 February 2012 | n/a |
Roger is missing a tooth, which could put a very important meal in jeopardy.
| 5 | 11 | "A Poem for Uncle Jack" | Mandie Fletcher | 7 March 2012 | n/a |
Who is the man outside? Why do Roger and Val need help from Julie Andrews?
| 6 | 12 | "The Gift" | Mandie Fletcher | 14 March 2012 | n/a |
Something arrives that will change Roger and Val's lives forever.

== Home media ==
The first series of Roger & Val was released on DVD on 13 September 2010. The second series was released on DVD in February 2013.
