= List of presidents of CBS Entertainment =

The following is a list of presidents of the entertainment division for the CBS television network. Frank Stanton, who served as the president of CBS between 1946 and 1971 and then as vice chairman until 1973, reorganized CBS into various divisions, including separate divisions for television and radio; the following executives served under him, CBS founder William S. Paley and later chairmen.

Name	Years	Notes
Hubbell Robinson	1947–1959; 1962–1963	
Louis G. Cowan	1958–1959	Cowan served as President of CBS Entertainment for two years, until he was forced to resign from CBS in 1959 in the wake of the quiz show scandals.
James T. Aubrey	1958–1965	His formula was characterized by a CBS executive as "broads, bosoms, and fun," resulting in such shows as The Beverly Hillbillies and Gilligan's Island, despised by the critics – and CBS chairman William S. Paley – but extremely popular with viewers. While Aubrey had a great feel for what would be successful with viewers, he had nothing but contempt for them. "The American public is something I fly over," he said.
Michael Dann	1963–1970	He took a pragmatic approach to programming, opting not to enforce a personal vision for the network other than to try to get more viewers without regard to key demographics. To this effect, he commissioned a number of rural sitcoms for the network (a format he personally hated) and, in 1967, canceled all of the network's profitable, but low-rated, game shows. He believed in the notions of hammocking and tent-pole programming, in which a new or struggling sitcom could be made more successful by putting more successful shows before and after it
Fred Silverman	1970–1975	To boost viewership in demographics that were believed to be more willing to respond to commercials, Silverman orchestrated the "rural purge" of 1971, which eventually eliminated many popular country-oriented shows, such as Green Acres, Mayberry R.F.D., Hee Haw and The Beverly Hillbillies from the CBS schedule. In their place, however, came a new wave of classics aimed at the upscale baby boomer generation, such as All in the Family, The Mary Tyler Moore Show, M*A*S*H, The Waltons, Cannon, Barnaby Jones, Kojak and The Sonny & Cher Comedy Hour. Silverman had an uncanny ability to spot burgeoning hit material, especially in the form of spin-offs, new television series developed with characters that appeared on an existing series. For example, he spun off Maude and The Jeffersons from All in the Family, and Rhoda from Mary Tyler Moore (as well as The Bob Newhart Show from MTM's writers). In early 1974, Silverman ordered a Maude spin-off titled Good Times; that series success led Silverman to schedule it against ABC's new hit, Happy Days, the following fall. In other dayparts, Silverman also reintroduced game shows to the network's daytime lineups in 1972 after a four-year absence; among the shows Silverman introduced was an updated version of the 1950s game show The Price Is Right, which remains on the air over four decades later. After the success of The Price Is Right, Silverman had established a working relationship with Mark Goodson and Bill Todman in which most of their game shows would appear on CBS, including a revival of Match Game. On Saturday mornings, Silverman commissioned Hanna-Barbera to produce the series Scooby-Doo, Where Are You!, and the character Fred Jones is named after Silverman. The success of Scooby-Doo led to several other Hanna-Barbera series airing on CBS in the early 1970s.
Lee Currlin	1975–1977	
Robert A. Daly	1977–1980	In addition to his duties as chief of television operations at CBS, Daly was also responsible for CBS Theatrical Films, which was formed in October 1979. During his 25-year association with CBS, Daly served in various posts, including executive vice president of CBS Television Network and vice president of business affairs.
Bud Grant	1980–1987	He was credited with spearheading some of CBS' best known shows of the 1980s, including Newhart and Murder, She Wrote.
Kim Lemasters	1987–1989	
Jeff Sagansky	1989–1994	
Peter Tortorici	1994–1995	
Leslie Moonves	1995–1998	Among the shows that gave CBS a new lease on life were the CSI franchise and Survivor. CBS had six of the ten most-watched primetime shows in the final quarter of 2005: CSI, Without a Trace, CSI: Miami, Survivor: Guatemala, NCIS, and Cold Case.
Nancy Tellem	1998–2004	She was responsible for deciding which shows appeared on CBS, supervised the prime-time, daytime, late-night and Saturday morning lineup on both CBS and The CW Television Network – the merged network of The WB and UPN – including shows like CSI, Survivor, Everybody Loves Raymond and The King of Queens, and helped create the landmark shows Friends and ER.
Nina Tassler	2004–2015	Tassler joined CBS in August 1997 as VP Drama, CBS Productions, before moving to the network as SVP Drama Development in 1998, then becoming President of Entertainment in 2004 and chairman in 2014.
Glenn Geller	2015–2017	
Kelly Kahl	2017–2022	Kahl joined CBS in January 1996 as VP Scheduling, CBS Entertainment, then becoming President of Entertainment in 2017. #1 in Daytime, Primetime and Late Night.
Amy Reisenbach	2023-present	
