= And Then There Was Eve =

- Directed by: Savannah Bloch
- Written by: Colette Freedman; Savannah Bloch
- Produced by: Jen Prince; Jhennifer Webberley
- Starring: Tania Nolan; Rachel Crowl; Mary Holland; Karan Soni; John Kassir; Anne Gee Byrd; Isley Reust
- Release date: June 18, 2017 (LAFF)
- Running time: 96 minutes
- Country: United States
- Language: English

And Then There Was Eve is a 2017 American drama film directed by Savannah Bloch. Bloch also cowrote the script with Colette Freedman. It stars Tania Nolan, Rachel Crowl, Mary Holland, Karan Soni, and John Kassir.

== Cast ==
- Tania Nolan as Alyssa
- Rachel Crowl as Eve
- Mary Holland as Laura
- Karan Soni as Zain
- John Kassir as G. Alexander
- Anne Gee Byrd as Blythe
- Isley Reust as Bartender
- Jenica Bergere as Robyn
- Mike Erwin as Neil
- Dominic Bogart as Julian
- Crystal Marie Denha as Doreen
- Christine Weatherup as Gabby
- Jack Cullison as Maxwell
- Jake Dynabursky as Timmy
- Rizi Timane as Tom
