= Love Is Strange (film) =

2014 film

- Film poster
- Directed by: Ira Sachs
- Written by: Ira Sachs; Mauricio Zacharias
- Produced by: Lucas Joaquin; Lars Knudsen; Ira Sachs; Jayne Baron Sherman; Jay Van Hoy
- Starring: Alfred Molina; John Lithgow; Darren Burrows; Charlie Tahan; Cheyenne Jackson; Manny Pérez; Marisa Tomei
- Cinematography: Christos Voudouris
- Edited by: Affonso Gonçalves; Michael Taylor
- Production companies: Parts & Labor
- Distributed by: Sony Pictures Classics
- Release dates: January 18, 2014 (Sundance); August 22, 2014
- Running time: 94 minutes
- Country: United States
- Languages: English; Russian
- Box office: $2.2 million

Love Is Strange is a 2014 American romantic drama film directed by Ira Sachs. The film had its premiere in the non-Competition programme of the 2014 Sundance Film Festival. The film was also screened in the Panorama section of the 64th Berlin International Film Festival.

== Plot ==
Ben and George, a same-sex couple from Manhattan, get married after 39 years together. George is a Catholic school music teacher, and when word of the marriage reaches the archdiocese, he is fired. Without his salary, the couple can no longer afford their New York apartment and are forced to ask their friends and family for shelter, resulting in their separation. Ben stays in Brooklyn with his nephew Elliot, Elliot's novelist wife Kate, and their teenage son Joey, while George bunks with their (now former) neighbors, a younger same-sex couple of two party-loving NYPD cops, Roberto and Ted. Still partnered but missing each other, Ben and George find ways to spend time together, as all parties involved deal with the happenstance of an additional person living in a space designed for fewer people. Elliot, Kate, Joey, Roberto and Ted decide how much they want to involve themselves in the lives of Ben and George, and vice versa.

== Cast ==
- John Lithgow as Ben Hull
- Alfred Molina as George Garea
- Marisa Tomei as Kate Hull
- Charlie Tahan as Joey Hull
- Cheyenne Jackson as Ted
- Harriet Sansom Harris as Honey
- Darren Burrows as Elliot Hull
- Christian Coulson as Ian
- John Cullum as Father Raymond
- Adriane Lenox as Principal
- Manny Pérez as Roberto
- Sebastian La Cause as Marco
- Christina Kirk as Mindy

== Reception ==
=== Critical response ===
Love Is Strange has a score of 93% on Rotten Tomatoes, based on 176 reviews, with an average rating of 7.73/10. The critical consensus states: "Held aloft by remarkable performances from John Lithgow and Alfred Molina, Love Is Strange serves as a graceful tribute to the beauty of commitment in the face of adversity." The film also has a score of 82 out of 100 on Metacritic, based on 42 reviews.

Keith Uhlich of The A.V. Club named Love Is Strange the best film of 2014.

=== Accolades ===
Award	Category	Recipients and nominees	Result
Dallas–Fort Worth Film Critics Association	Best Supporting Actor	Alfred Molina	Nominated
Gotham Awards	Best Feature	Love Is Strange	Nominated
Independent Spirit Awards	Best Film	Love Is Strange	Nominated
Independent Spirit Awards	Best Male Lead	John Lithgow	Nominated
Independent Spirit Awards	Best Screenplay	Ira Sachs and Mauricio Zacharias	Nominated
Independent Spirit Awards	Best Supporting Male	Alfred Molina	Nominated
Satellite Awards	Best Film	Love is Strange	Nominated
Satellite Awards	Best Original Screenplay	Ira Sachs and Mauricio Zacharias	Nominated
Women Film Critics Circle	Best Male Images in Movies	Love is Strange	Won
