= Out of the Wilderness =

2001 film by Steve Kroschel

- Directed by: Steve Kroschel
- Written by: Gabe Essoe; Steve Kroschel
- Starring: David Carradine; Robert Caso
- Music by: David Reynolds
- Release date: 10 August 2001
- Running time: 98 min
- Country: United States
- Language: English

Out of the Wilderness is a 2001 television film directed by Steve Kroschel.

== Plot ==
This is the story of a raven, considered by ornithologists to be the most intelligent of birds, who through its antics disrupts a family, even to causing enough problems that the town finally decides to put the bird on trial for its life. The tale is told in retrospect during that trial by the young girl who owns it.
