= Tania Nolan =

New Zealand actress (born 1983)

- Born: 19 August 1983 (age 43); Rakaia, Canterbury, New Zealand
- Occupation: Actress
- Years active: 1991–present

Tania Nolan (born 19 August 1983) is a New Zealand actress from Rakaia, Canterbury, New Zealand. She is best known for her roles as Isobel Jones in the New Zealand television series The Hothouse (2007) and Angelina Caulfield in the comedy/drama series Go Girls (2009).

== Early life ==
Nolan was born in Rakaia where she lived until age eight, and then moved to nearby Barrhill for the next two years. She is of Irish descent.

== Career ==
Nolan graduated from Toi Whakaari Drama School in 2005 with a Bachelor in Performing Arts (Acting).

She appeared in The Hothouse as Isobel Jones, a role that earned her a nomination for Best Actress at the 2007 NZ Qantas Television Awards. Nolan had a recurring role in Go Girls as Angelina Caulfield. She has starred in the feature film Kissy Kissy (NZ International Film Festival 2007), with an international debut in Underworld: Rise of the Lycans (2009); Nolan also had a supporting role in the Starz series Spartacus: Blood and Sand.

In 2017, Nolan joined the cast of Home and Away as Scarlett Snow. She made her first appearance on 8 May 2017. She departed the show at the conclusion of her character's storyline.

== Filmography ==
=== Film ===
Year	Title	Role	Notes
2007	When Night Falls	Louise Williams	
2007	Kissy Kissy	Alison	
2008	Night of Sunshine	Rachel	Short
2009	Underworld: Rise of the Lycans	Luka	
2011	You Are Dreaming	Marya Lamotte	Short
2011	The Gift	Emma	Short
2012	For Who I Am	Rona	Short
2012	Croquembouche	Marion	Short
2012	The Knightswood	Mom - Princess	Short
2012	A Better Place Than This	Sophie	Short
2014	Dishonestly Yours	Sofia	Short
2014	9 to 5 Feet Under	Rebecca	Short
2014	Whispers	Alice	Short
2016	The 6th Friend	Sahara	
2016	Break the Will	Mathilda	Short
2017	Into the Rainbow	Lindsay	
2017	And Then There Was Eve	Alyssa	
2019	Take Out Girl	Melissa	
2024	Tinā	Helen	
20??	Static	Nella	Post-production

=== Television ===
Year	Title	Role	Notes
2007	The Hothouse	Isobel Jones	TV series
2008–2009	Legend of the Seeker	Dennee Amnell	Episodes: "Prophecy", "Sacrifice"
2009	The Cult	Karyn	Episode: "The Other Woman"
2009–2011	Go Girls	Angelina Caulfield	Recurring role (series 1–3)
2010	Spartacus: Blood and Sand	Caecilia	Episodes: "Mark of the Brotherhood", "Party Favors", "Kill Them All"
2010	This Is Not My Life	Natasha Collins	Main role
2012	Fight Night Legacy	Nat	Episodes: "Sweet Science", "The Offer"
2014–2015	Step Dave	Julia Deering	Main role
2015	Grayson: Earth One	Emma Walker	Episode: "The Boy and the Bullet"
2017	Home and Away	Scarlett Snow	Regular role
2019	NCIS	Nena Easterling	Episode: "Mona Lisa"
2022	My Life is Murder (TV series NZ)	Gilda	Series 3 Episode 9
2026	Crackhead (TV series NZ)	Emma Solomon	Supporting cast member
2026	Shortland Street	Dr. Sophia Crane	Supporting regular role

== Awards ==
Nominated for Best Actress in the 2007 Qantas Television Awards for her role in The Hothouse.
