= Return to Zero (film) =

- DVD cover
- Directed by: Sean Hanish
- Written by: Sean Hanish
- Produced by: Sean Hanish; Paul Jaconi-Biery
- Starring: Minnie Driver; Paul Adelstein; Alfred Molina; Connie Nielsen; Andrea Anders; Kathy Baker; Sarah Jones
- Cinematography: Harris Charalambous
- Edited by: Anita Brandt-Burgoyne
- Music by: James T. Sale
- Production company: Cannonball Productions
- Release date: March 8, 2014
- Country: United States
- Language: English

Return to Zero is a drama film written and directed by Sean Hanish and stars Minnie Driver, Paul Adelstein, Alfred Molina, Connie Nielsen, Andrea Anders, Kathy Baker, and Sarah Jones with Peter Jason. It was first shown at the Cinequest Film Festival on March 8, 2014, then had an international premiere on the Lifetime Network on May 17, 2014. It was the first Lifetime original to receive a simultaneous international release.

== Plot ==
Return to Zero is based on a true story in which a successful couple named Aaron and Maggie are expecting their first child, only to have their lives devastated when they learn that the child has died in the womb. The film is based on the experiences of its writer, Sean Hanish, and his wife. Driver and Adelstein co-wrote and performed the film's title song.

== Cast ==
- Minnie Driver as Maggie Royal
- Paul Adelstein as Aaron Royal
- Alfred Molina as Robert Royal
- Connie Nielsen as Dr. Claire Holden
- Kathy Baker as Kathleen Callaghan
- Sarah Jones as Dana
- Andrea Anders as Trish
- Peter Jason as Gerry

== Reception ==
Matt Roush of TV Guide called Return to Zero, "A delicately etched and intimately powerful portrait of grief and bitter loss. Return to Zero stars a fearless Minnie Driver and the ever-affable Paul Adelstein as a couple rocked to their emotional core by the loss of their unborn child, discovered to have died in the womb shortly before the delivery date. We follow them through the wrenching procedure and recovery process with a stark realism in which husband and wife are often seen at their worst, as their once-solid relationship frays when Maggie plummets into depression and neither seem able to say or do the right things to be able to heal and move on. Though sometimes hard to watch, Zero is a compelling and beautifully acted character study that will make you care as it dramatizes a domestic tragedy with a minimum of melodrama, so rare for TV and TV-movies."

Robert Bianco of USA Today wrote, "Minnie Driver and Paul Adelstein give first-rate performances in this lovely, moving film about a couple whose marriage falters when their baby is stillborn… It's a subject worthy of education and one that seldom gets dealt with on television."

Brian Lowry of Variety called Return to Zero "a painful portrait of devastating loss, pivoting on a performance by Minnie Driver that acutely captures those raw feelings." He also wrote, "Hanish deftly zeroes in on how all the preparation and enthusiasm surrounding a new baby magnifies the enormity of the parents’ pain here — as well as the different ways people cope, or don’t, with such events."

Minnie Driver was nominated for the award for Best Actress in a Movie or Miniseries at the 4th Critics' Choice Television Awards (the award was won by Jessica Lange for American Horror Story: Coven) and for the Primetime Emmy Award for Outstanding Lead Actress in a Miniseries or a Movie.

== Crowdfunding ==
During post-production, Hanish turned to Kickstarter to raise additional funds to cover music, post-production sound and color-correction. This crowdfunding effort raised more than the requested amount. Minnie Driver stated on the CBS Sunday Morning show (June 8, 2014) that more than 700 families of stillborn children contributed to the crowdsourcing. As the film is based on a true story, Hanish dedicated it to his own son, "in loving memory of Norbert Krekorian Hanish b. July 12, 2005", and listed the names of many other stillborn children.

== Awards and nominations ==
Return To Zero was awarded the 2014 Satellite Award for Motion Picture Made for Television. Writer/Director Sean Hanish was also nominated for a Writers Guild of America Award for his screenplay. For her performance, Minnie Driver was a 2014 Emmy nominee for Outstanding Lead Actress In A Miniseries Or A Movie and was also nominated for a 2014 Satellite Award.

Awards
Year	Award	Category	Recipient	Result
2014	Primetime Emmy Award	Outstanding Lead Actress in a Miniseries or a Movie	Minnie Driver	Nominated
2014	Critics' Choice Television Award	Best Actress in a Movie/Miniseries	Minnie Driver	Nominated
2015	Satellite Award	Best Miniseries or Television Film	Return to Zero	Won
2015	Writers Guild of America Awards	Long Form Original	Sean Hanish	Nominated
