= Sister Cities (film) =

- Promotional poster
- Genre: Drama
- Based on: Sister Cities by Colette Freedman
- Written by: Colette Freedman
- Directed by: Sean Hanish
- Starring: Jess Weixler; Stana Katic; Michelle Trachtenberg; Troian Bellisario; Jacki Weaver
- Composer: James T. Sale
- Country of origin: United States
- Original language: English

Production
- Executive producers: Kelly Kahl; Alfred Molina
- Producers: Sean Hanish; Paul Jaconi-Biery; Eleonore Dailly
- Cinematography: Keith Dunkerley
- Editor: Cecily Rhett
- Running time: 86 minutes
- Production company: Cannonball Productions

Original release
- Network: Lifetime
- Release: September 17, 2016

Sister Cities is a 2016 American drama television film directed by Sean Hanish, based on the 2006 play of the same name by Colette Freedman. The film stars Stana Katic, Jess Weixler, Michelle Trachtenberg, and Troian Bellisario as the four sisters along with Jacki Weaver, Alfred Molina, Amy Smart, and Tom Everett Scott filling out the rest of the cast. It premiered on Lifetime on September 17, 2016.

== Plot ==
After Mary Baxter appears to drown herself in her bathtub, Austin, her second oldest daughter who has been taking care of her, calls home her three half-sisters, Carolina, Dallas and Baltimore. There, the four deal not only with their mother's death but unresolved issues they had with her and each other.

== Cast ==
- Jacki Weaver as Mary Baxter, 71, the mother of the four women.
  - Amy Smart as 41- to 63-year-old Mary Baxter
- Jess Weixler as Austin Baxter, 29, a writer who moved back home to take care of Mary. Her father is Mort, who is also Mary's best friend. She is a lesbian with a girlfriend named Sarah.
  - Ava Kolker as 8-year-old Austin Baxter
- Stana Katic as Carolina "Carol" Baxter Shaw, 37, a lawyer who is on track to being a judge, she is the daughter of Mary and Roger. She is also an alcoholic.
  - Kaia Gerber as 13- to 16-year-old Carolina Baxter
  - Roxie Hanish as 7-year-old Carolina Baxter
- Michelle Trachtenberg as Dallas Baxter, 27, a perfectionist, married to Peter, in the process of a divorce. Her father was Sully, who died in a car accident.
  - Kayla Levine as 6-year-old Dallas Baxter
- Troian Bellisario as Baltimore Baxter, 21, the youngest sister. She is an eccentric college student. Her father was a piano player at a jazz club.
  - Serendipity Lilliana as Young Baltimore Baxter
- Alfred Molina as Mort Stone, 62, Austin's father and best friend of Mary Baxter.
  - Fidel Gomez as Young Mort Stone
- Tom Everett Scott as Chief Barton Brady, 39, Carolina's ex-love interest. He is also chief of police.
- Aimee Garcia as Sarah, 31, Austin's girlfriend
- Kathy Baker as Janis, a publisher
- Peter Jason as Dr. Timmins
- Patrick Davis as Carlos
- Colette Freedman as Brontë

== Production ==
=== Casting ===
On July 16, 2015, Kaia Gerber was cast as a young Carolina. On July 20, 2015, it was confirmed that Troian Bellisario, Stana Katic, Jess Weixler, and Michelle Trachtenberg had signed on to play the four sisters, Baltimore, Carolina, Austin, and Dallas, respectively. The following day, it was confirmed Jacki Weaver and Amy Smart was cast as a Mary and young Mary, respectively along with Alfred Molina. Aimee Garcia joined the cast as Sarah, a girlfriend of one of the sisters.

=== Filming ===
Principal photography began on July 10, 2015, in Los Angeles when, after "only about 3 shots into filming" a grenade was found on set and production was stopped for two hours.
