= Alfred Molina =

British actor (born 1953)

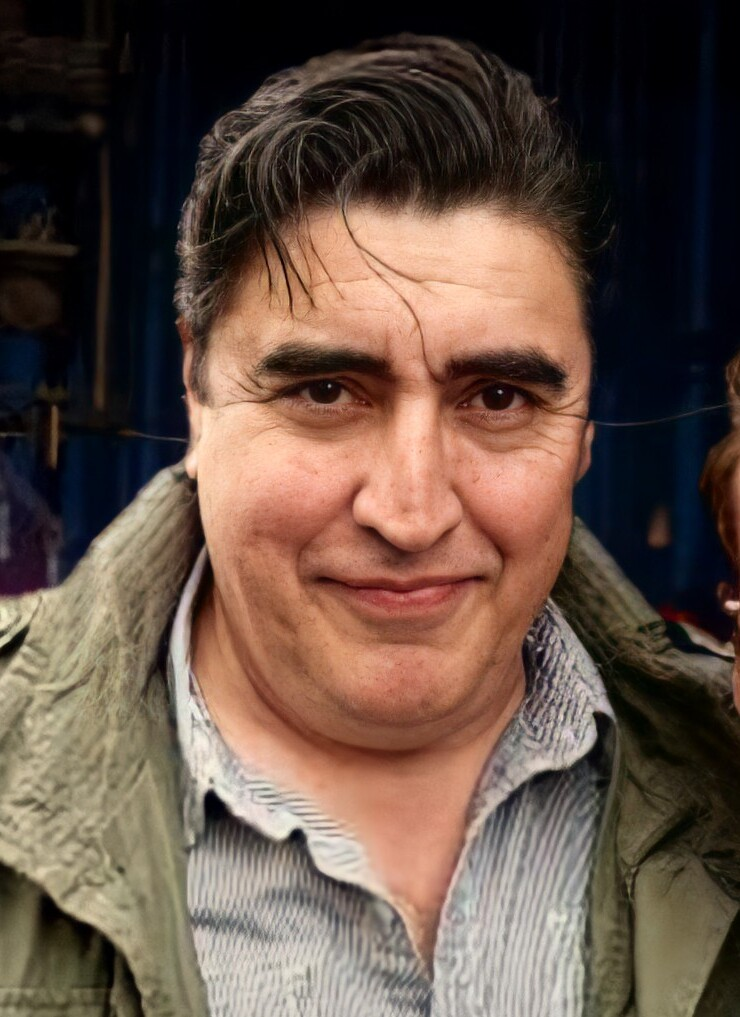
- Molina in 2021
- Born: Alfredo Molina; 24 May 1953 (age 73); London, England
- Citizenship: United Kingdom; United States (since 2004)
- Education: Guildhall School of Music and Drama
- Occupation: Actor
- Years active: 1970–present
- Spouses: Jill Gascoine (m. 1986; died 2020) Jennifer Lee (m. 2021)
- Children: 1
- Awards: Full list

Alfred Molina (born Alfredo Molina; 24 May 1953) is an English actor. He is known for roles on the stage and screen. Molina has received a Drama Desk Award as well as nominations for two British Academy Film Awards, a British Independent Film Award, an Independent Spirit Award, five Screen Actors Guild Awards, and three Tony Awards.

He first rose to prominence in the West End, earning a nomination for the Laurence Olivier Award for Best Newcomer in a Play for his performance in the production of Oklahoma! in 1980. He received Tony Award nominations for his roles on Broadway playing Yvan in Art (1998), Tevye in Fiddler on the Roof (2004), and Mark Rothko in Red (2009). He returned to Broadway playing Professor Serebryakov in a revival of Uncle Vanya (2024).

On film, he made his debut as Satipo in Raiders of the Lost Ark (1981). He went on to receive two BAFTA Award nominations for his roles as Diego Rivera in Frida (2002), and Jack Mellor in An Education (2009). His other notable films include Prick Up Your Ears (1987), Enchanted April (1991), Boogie Nights (1997), Chocolat (2000), Luther (2003), The Da Vinci Code (2006), and Love Is Strange (2014). He has voiced characters in Rango (2011), Monsters University (2013), Ralph Breaks the Internet (2018), Frozen 2 (2019), and Remarkably Bright Creatures (2026). He is also known for his portrayal of Otto Octavius / Doctor Octopus in Sam Raimi's Spider-Man 2 (2004) and the Marvel Cinematic Universe film Spider-Man: No Way Home (2021).

On television, Molina has received two nominations for the Primetime Emmy Award for Outstanding Supporting Actor in a Limited or Anthology Series or Movie for his roles as Ben Weeks in the HBO movie The Normal Heart (2014), and Robert Aldrich in the FX miniseries Feud: Bette and Joan (2017). His other notable television credits include Meantime (1983), Murder on the Orient Express (2001), the Tales of Arcadia series (2019-2021), Three Pines (2022), and The Boroughs (2026).

== Early life and education ==
He was born Alfredo Molina in Paddington, London. His parents were both immigrants: his Spanish father – Esteban Molina from Murcia – was a waiter who had parachuted into France with SOE before D-Day, and his Italian mother – Giovanna Bonelli – worked as a cleaner.

Molina grew up working-class in Notting Hill an area inhabited by many other immigrant families. He attended the nearby Cardinal Manning Roman Catholic School (now St Charles Catholic Sixth Form College). He decided to become an actor after seeing Spartacus at the age of nine, and attended the Guildhall School of Music and Drama, as well as auditioning for and becoming a member of the National Youth Theatre. Molina admitted in May 2024 that his father was disappointed in him for pursuing a career in acting.

At the age of 21, he anglicised his name to Alfred, at the urging of his first agent.

== Career ==
=== 1978–1989: Early work ===
Molina appeared with Leonard Rossiter in the sitcom The Losers (1978). He made his film debut with a minor role alongside Harrison Ford in Steven Spielberg's adventure film Raiders of the Lost Ark (1981) as Indiana Jones's traitorous and ill-fated guide, Satipo, during its iconic opening sequence. Molina stated in an interview in 2013 that he owes his stage and film career to the Indiana Jones series. "I'm very, very proud of that, I have to admit I didn't think at the time, 'Oh, this is going to go down in movie history.' I'd never been in front of a camera before," Molina said about his short but memorable appearance in Raiders of the Lost Ark. He recalled getting the job as a "gift from God" and said, "I've publicly thanked Steven many, many times. That job saved my bacon, in more ways than one." About his now-famous line in the film, Molina stated that "I've never had a problem with people coming up to me about it. They'll shout that line to me, 'Throw me the idol, I'll throw you the whip!' I'm delighted that people still remember it."

However, his big break came with Letter to Brezhnev (1985), which he followed with a starring role in Prick Up Your Ears (1987), playing Joe Orton's lover (and eventual murderer) Kenneth Halliwell. He was originally cast as Arnold Rimmer in the TV sitcom Red Dwarf, but was replaced by Chris Barrie.

=== 1990–1999: Broadway debut and acclaim ===
In the early 1990s, Molina was a ubiquitous presence on British television, with his highest profile role being the lead in the first two series of El C.I.D.. He appeared in the critically acclaimed films such as Mike Newell's costume drama Enchanted April (1992), Richard Donner's western comedy Maverick (1994), and Jim Jarmusch's western Dead Man (1995). Subsequent film roles include the drama Not Without My Daughter (1991), the science fiction horror film Species (1995), the broad comedy Dudley Do-Right (1999). With a midwestern American accent, Molina starred alongside Betty White in the US television series Ladies Man, which ran from 1999 to 2001. In 1993 he appeared in the BBC miniseries adaptation of A Year in Provence, playing the annoying Tony, along with John Thaw and Lindsay Duncan. In 1995, Molina starred with Marisa Tomei in The Perez Family, playing Cuban refugees who pretend to be married so they can more easily stay in America. Marjorie Baumgarten praised Molina as attaining "the right mixture of gentle honor and baffled stupefaction" to portray his character, although Peter Rainer of Los Angeles Times called Molina "so intensely sodden that he's like a great big scowling dark cloud." Molina has worked twice with Paul Thomas Anderson, first in Boogie Nights (1997) and then in Magnolia (1999).

Molina made his Broadway debut in Yasmina Reza's Art in 1998 and subsequently performed on Broadway as Tevye in Fiddler on the Roof and Mark Rothko in Red.

=== 2000–2009: Established actor ===
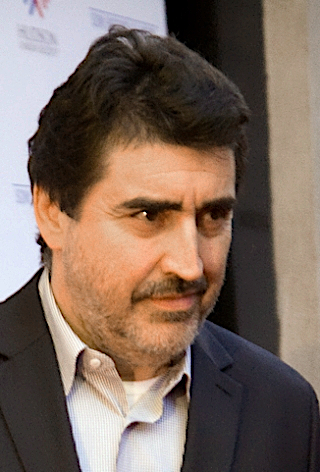
Molina in 2009

In 2000, Molina appeared in Lasse Hallström's Chocolat which received critical acclaim and an Academy Award for Best Picture nomination. He gained wide recognition for his portrayal of Diego Rivera alongside Salma Hayek in the biopic Frida (2002), a role for which he gained BAFTA and SAG award nominations. He played himself alongside Steve Coogan in Jarmusch's Coffee and Cigarettes (2003) and gained further commercial recognition when he portrayed Johann Tetzel in Luther (2003) and Otto Octavius / Doctor Octopus in Spider-Man 2 (2004), which became one of the highest-grossing films of that year. For the latter, Molina was nominated for a Satellite Award as Best Supporting Actor. He reprised his role in the video game adaptation. In 2006, Molina portrayed Touchstone in Kenneth Branagh's film version of Shakespeare's As You Like It and appeared in Ron Howard's adaptation of The Da Vinci Code. Molina provided the voice of the villain Ares in the 2009 animated film Wonder Woman.

Molina's stage work has included two major Royal National Theatre productions, Tennessee Williams' The Night of the Iguana (as Shannon) and David Mamet's Speed-the-Plow (as Fox). In his Broadway debut, Molina performed in Yasmina Reza's Tony Award-winning play 'Art', for which he received a Tony nomination in 1998. In 2004, Molina returned to the stage, starring as Tevye in the Broadway production of Fiddler on the Roof. For his performance he once again received a Tony Award nomination, this time for Best Actor in a Musical. He received his third Tony Award nomination for Red in 2010, for Best Performance by a Leading Actor in a Play.

In 2007, Molina narrated a 17-part original audiobook for Audible.com called The Chopin Manuscript. This serialised novel was written by a team of 15 best-selling thriller writers, including Jeffery Deaver, Lee Child, Joseph Finder and Lisa Scottoline. The novel won the 2008 Audiobook of the Year Award from Audio Publishers Association.

=== 2010–2019 Career expansion ===
On 1 April 2010, Molina opened at Broadway's John Golden Theatre in the role of artist Mark Rothko in John Logan's drama Red opposite Eddie Redmayne for a limited engagement through 27 June. He had played the role to much critical success at the Donmar Warehouse in London in December 2009 and revisited that role at the Wyndham's Theatre in the West End in 2018.

In 2010, Molina starred opposite Dawn French in the six-part BBC sitcom Roger & Val Have Just Got In, with a second series in 2012.

Molina has three Lego Minifigures modelled after him, namely Doctor Octopus from Spider-Man 2 and Spider-Man: No Way Home, Satipo from Raiders of the Lost Ark, and Sheik Amar from Prince of Persia. In July 2010, it was announced that Molina had joined the cast of Law & Order: LA as Deputy District Attorney Morales. He previously guest-starred in a two-part crossover in 2005 in two other Law & Order franchise shows, Law & Order: Special Victims Unit and Law & Order: Trial by Jury.

In 2014, Molina starred with John Lithgow in Love is Strange, portraying a same-sex couple that becomes separated after marrying. Molina was attracted to the film due to the script's polish, and that his character George "shares some of the same idiosyncrasies Alfred Molina has: a tendency towards pedantry, liking things just so, sort of neat and organized. All those things that make George very different from Ben, I found myself relating to very much." The New York Times lauded Lithgow and Molina as being able to "beautifully capture the small pleasures and petty irritations Ben and George live through, and also their pride at having survived, together, for so long." Peter Bradshaw wrote that the two actors "give excellent performances in a film composed in a reflective minor key."

Molina is a patron of the performing arts group Theatretrain. He is also a longtime member of the Los Angeles theatre company The New American Theatre, formerly known as Circus Theatricals, where he often teaches Shakespeare and Scene Study along with the company's artistic director Jack Stehlin. In 2017 he portrayed film director Robert Aldrich in Ryan Murphy's FX limited series Feud: Bette & Joan. The series revolved around the filming of What Ever Happened to Baby Jane? in 1962 and the relationship between actresses Bette Davis and Joan Crawford played by Susan Sarandon and Jessica Lange respectively. Molina received critical praise for the film as well as awards attention received nominations from the Primetime Emmy Awards, and Golden Globe Awards for his performance.

=== 2020–present ===
In 2020, Molina appeared in David Oyelowo's drama The Water Man, and Emerald Fennell's black comedy thriller Promising Young Woman. On 8 December 2020, it was announced that he would be returning as Doctor Octopus for Spider-Man: No Way Home (2021) in the Marvel Cinematic Universe (MCU), set to premiere on 17 December 2021. Molina later confirmed that he would actually be reprising his role as the Spider-Man 2 incarnation of Doctor Octopus in No Way Home, retconning his character's apparent death at the end of the former film. He was digitally de-aged to his 2004 self. On 2 September 2021, it was announced that Alfred Molina was set to star in Amazon Prime police drama series Three Pines, which comes from The Crown producer Left Bank Pictures. Molina plays Chief Inspector Armand Gamache of the Sûreté du Québec, the lead character from Louise Penny's book series (including Still Life, the first entry of the unnamed series), he also serves as executive producer for the show. The trailer came out in October 2022 and the show premiered in December 2022. It was cancelled after one season.

In 2024, Molina returned to Broadway playing Professor Serebryakov in a revival of Anton Chekov's Uncle Vanya (2024). The production was directed by Lila Neugebauer and adapted by Heidi Schreck. Molina co-starred alongside Steve Carell, William Jackson Harper, Alison Pill, Anika Noni Rose, and Jayne Houdyshell. He would also play the narrator in the film version of Harold and the Purple Crayon. In 2026, he voiced the character of Benjamin Franklin in BBC Radio 4's adaptation of the musical 1776. Molina returned to octopus-themed roles in the 2026 Netflix film Remarkably Bright Creatures, where he voices Marcellus, a Giant Pacific octopus.

Currently, Molina is playing Sam Cooper in the Netflix series The Boroughs (2026).

== Personal life ==
Molina has been a dual UK/US citizen since 2004. In 2017, he moved from the city of Los Angeles to La Cañada Flintridge. In addition to English, he is fluent in French, Italian and Spanish.

Molina has a daughter, Rachel, from a previous relationship. In 1986, Molina married actress Jill Gascoine in Tower Hamlets, London. They remained married until her death on 28 April 2020 in Los Angeles from Alzheimer's disease. In November 2019, director Jennifer Lee confirmed that she was in a relationship with Molina, the two having worked together in Frozen 2 (2019), and they later married in August 2021.

Molina is an advocate for people with AIDS. He donates towards AIDS research, participates in the Los Angeles AIDS Walk and appeared as himself in a documentary produced by Joseph Kibler (who has been HIV+ and paraplegic since his birth, c. 1989) about Kibler's life titled Walk On, first screened in 2013.

When playing the role of Sayyed Bozorg Mahmoody in Not Without My Daughter (1991), Molina was physically assaulted on his way to a rehearsal by a man who mistook him for the real Mahmoody.

== Stage credits ==
Year	Title	Role	Theater
1970	King Stag	Cigolotti/ Durandarte	Tower Theatre Company
1971	Twelfth Night	Dramaturge	Hayworth Theatre
1976	King Lear	Walk-on (Knights/Soldiers/Servants)	Royal Shakespeare Theatre
1977	That Good Between Us	Jumbo/ Private Hart/ Riot Soldier	Royal Shakespeare Company
1977	Bandits	P C Boyd/ Pathologist	Warehouse Theatre
1977	The Days of the Commune	Bismarck / Fat Gentleman / Mayor 1 / Priest	Aldwych Theatre
1978	Frozen Assets	Al	Warehouse Theatre
1978	A Miserable and Lonely Death	Major Snyman	Aldwych Theatre
1979	Accidental Death of an Anarchist	The Maniac	Half Moon Theatre
1980–81	Oklahoma!	Jud Fry	Palace Theatre, West End
1981	Can't Pay? Won't Pay!	Giovanni Bardi	Criterion Theatre
1982	Destry Rides Again	Tom Destry	Donmar Warehouse
1982	Wizard of Oz	Witch of the North	Half Moon Theatre
1983	Macbeth	Macbeth	Liverpool Playhouse
1984	A Little Like Drowning	Alfredo	Hampstead Theatre
1985	Happy End	Sammy 'Mammy' Wurlitzer	Royal Shakespeare Company National West Tour
1985	The Taming of the Shrew	Petruchio	Royal Shakespeare Company National West Tour
1986–87	Serious Money	Zac Zackerman	Royal Court Theatre
1989	Speed-the-Plow	Charlie Fox	Royal National Theatre, London
1992	The Night of the Iguana	Rev. T. Lawrence Shannon	Royal National Theatre, London
1995–96	Molly Sweeney	Frank Sweeney	Laura Pels Theatre, RTC
1998	Art	Yvan	Bernard B. Jacobs Theatre, Broadway
2001	True West	Lee	Skirball Cultural Center, Los Angeles
2002	Richard III	Duke of Buckingham	Odyssey Theatre
2004–05	Fiddler on the Roof	Tevye	Minskoff Theatre, Broadway
2006	The Cherry Orchard	Lopakhin	Mark Taper Forum, Los Angeles
2007	Howard Katz	Howard Katz	Laura Pels Theatre, RTC
2009–10	Red	Mark Rothko	Donmar Warehouse, London
2010	Red	Mark Rothko	John Golden Theatre, Broadway
2012	Red	Mark Rothko	Mark Taper Forum, Los Angeles
2013	Red	Mark Rothko	L.A. Theatre Works
2016	And No More Shall We Part	Don	Williamstown Theatre Festival
2017	Long Day's Journey into Night	James Tyrone	Geffen Playhouse, Los Angeles
2018	Red	Mark Rothko	Wyndham's Theatre, West End
2020	The Father	André	Pasadena Playhouse
2023	Inherit the Wind	Henry Drummond	Pasadena Playhouse
2024	Uncle Vanya	Aleksandr Vladimirovich Serebryakov	Lincoln Center Theatre

== Filmography ==
=== Film ===
==== Feature films ====
Year	Title	Role	Notes
1981	Raiders of the Lost Ark	Satipo	
1983	Meantime	Paul	
1985	Letter to Brezhnev	Sergei	
1985	Ladyhawke	Cezar	
1985	Water	Pierre	
1985	Eleni	Young Christos	Uncredited
1987	Prick Up Your Ears	Kenneth Halliwell	
1988	Manifesto	Avanti	
1989	Virtuoso	John Ogdon	
1989	Rescuers Speaking	Italian Priest	
1991	Hancock	Tony Hancock	
1991	Not Without My Daughter	Sayyed Bozorg Mahmoody	
1991	American Friends	Oliver Syme	
1992	Enchanted April	Mellersh Wilkins	
1992	A Very Polish Practice	Tadeusz Melnik	
1993	A Year in Provence	Tony Havers	
1993	The Trial	Titorelli	
1993	When Pigs Fly	Marty	
1994	Maverick	Angel	
1994	White Fang 2: Myth of the White Wolf	Reverend Leland Drury	
1994	Cabin Boy	Nathaniel's History Teacher	Uncredited
1995	Species	Dr. Stephen Arden	
1995	The Steal	Cliff	
1995	The Perez Family	Juan Raúl Perez	
1995	Dead Man	Trading Post Missionary	
1995	Scorpion Spring	Denis Brabant	
1995	Hideaway	Dr. Jonas Nyebern	
1995	Nervous Energy	Ira Moss	
1996	Mojave Moon	Sal	
1996	Before and After	Panos Demeris	
1997	Anna Karenina	Levin	
1997	Boogie Nights	Rahad Jackson	
1997	The Man Who Knew Too Little	Boris 'The Butcher' Blavasky	
1997	A Further Gesture	Tulio	
1998	The Impostors	Sir Jeremy Burtom	
1998	Rescuers: Stories of Courage: Two Couples		
1998	Pete's Meteor	Hugh	
1998	The Treat	The Colonel	
1999	Dudley Do-Right	Snidely K. "Whip" Whiplash	
1999	Magnolia	Solomon Solomon	
2000	The Miracle Maker	Simon the Pharisee (voice)	
2000	Chocolat	Comte De Reynaud	
2001	Texas Rangers	King Fisher	
2002	Frida	Diego Rivera	
2002	Plots with a View	Boris Plots	
2003	My Life Without Me	Ann's Father	
2003	Identity	Dr. Malick	
2003	Coffee and Cigarettes	Himself	
2003	Luther	Johann Tetzel	
2004	Crónicas	Victor Hugo Puente	
2004	Spider-Man 2	Dr. Otto Octavius / Doctor Octopus	
2004	Steamboy	James Edward Steam (voice)	English dub
2006	The Da Vinci Code	Bishop Manuel Aringarosa	
2006	As You Like It	Touchstone	
2007	The Hoax	Dick Suskind	
2007	Silk	Baldabiou	
2007	The Ten Commandments	Ramesses (voice)	
2007	The Moon and the Stars	Davide Rieti	
2007	The Little Traitor	Sergeant Dunlop	
2008	Nothing like the Holidays	Edy Rodriguez	
2009	An Education	Jack Mellor	
2009	The Pink Panther 2	Randall Pepperidge	
2009	Angels & Demons	Narrator (voice)	
2009	The Lodger	Chandler Manning	
2010	The Tempest	Stefano	
2010	Prince of Persia: The Sands of Time	Sheik Amar	
2010	The Sorcerer's Apprentice	Maxim Horvath	
2011	The Dark Ages	Alexander Goldgoff	
2011	Abduction	Frank Burton	
2011	Rango	Roadkill (voice)	
2012	The Forger	Everly Campbell	
2013	Bless Me, Ultima	Antonio (voice)	
2013	The Truth About Emanuel	Dennis	
2013	Justin and the Knights of Valour	Reginald (voice)	
2013	Monsters University	Professor Derek Knight (voice)	
2013	Vivaldi	Tartini	
2014	Love Is Strange	George	
2014	Return to Zero	Robert Royal	
2014	We'll Never Have Paris	Terry Berman	
2014	Swelter	Doc	
2014	Kahlil Gibran's The Prophet	Sergeant (voice)	
2014	Heavenly Sword	King Bohan (voice)	
2015	Strange Magic	Fairy King (voice)	
2015	The Secret in Their Eyes	Martin Morales	
2016	Little Men	Hernán	
2016	Donald Trump's The Art of the Deal: The Movie	Jerry Schrager	
2016	Whiskey Tango Foxtrot	Ali Massoud Sadiq	
2016	Paint It Black	Cal	
2016	Message from the King	Preston	
2016	A Family Man	Lou Wheeler	
2017	Breakable You	Paul Weller	
2018	The Front Runner	Ben Bradlee	
2018	Saint Judy	Ray Hernandez	
2018	Ralph Breaks the Internet	Double Dan (voice)	
2018	Henchmen	Baron Blackout (voice)	
2018	Vice	Waiter	Uncredited cameo
2019	Don't Let Go	Howard Keleshian	
2019	The Devil Has a Name	Big Boss	
2019	Frozen 2	King Agnarr (voice)	
2020	Promising Young Woman	Jordan Green	Uncredited
2020	The Water Man	Jim Bussey	
2021	Trollhunters: Rise of the Titans	Archie (voice)	
2021	Spider-Man: No Way Home	Dr. Otto Octavius / Doctor Octopus	
2022	DC League of Super-Pets	Jor-El (voice)	
2023	Spider-Man: Across the Spider-Verse	Dr. Otto Octavius / Doctor Octopus (voice)	Cameo; Archival audio
2024	The Instigators	Richie Dechico	
2024	Harold and the Purple Crayon	Narrator / Crockett Johnson	
2026	Remarkably Bright Creatures	Marcellus (voice)	
TBA	The Chaperones †	TBA	Post-production

==== Short films ====
Year	Title	Role	Notes
2006	Orchids	Cliff	
2009	Big Guy	Kent	
2017	Sam Did It	Himself	
2019	Frankenstein's Monster's Monster, Frankenstein	Aubrey Fields	

==== Direct-to-video films ====
Year	Title	Role	Notes
2007	Chill Out, Scooby-Doo!	Professor Jeffries (voice)	
2009	Wonder Woman	Ares (voice)	
2017	Justice League Dark	Destiny (voice)	

=== Television ===
==== TV series ====
Year	Title	Role	Notes
1978	The Losers	Nigel	6 episodes
1981	Bognor	Waiter	2 episodes
1982	Joni Jones	Giovanni	Episode: "JONI JONES Y Ffoadur"
1983	Reilly, Ace of Spies	Yakov Blumkin	Episode: "Gambit"
1985	C.A.T.S. Eyes	Det. Sgt. Cropper	Episode: "Blue for Danger"
1986	Casualty	Harry Horner	Episode: "Jump Start"
1987	Miami Vice	Esther's Attorney	Episode: "The Big Thaw"
1989	Saracen	Jose Morazan	Episode: "Proof of Death"
1989	Revolutionary Witness	The Butcher/ Robert Sauveur	Episode: "The Butcher"
1989–92	Screen One	Various characters	4 episodes
1989–95	Screen Two	Various characters	4 episodes
1990–92	El C.I.D.	Bernard Blake	13 episodes
1991	Ashenden	Carmona	Episode: "The Hairless Mexican"
1991	Performance	George Melly	Episode: "The Trials of Oz"
1991	Boon	Mike Hubble	Episode: "The Night Before Christmas"
1996	Tracey Takes On...	Mr. Dragotti	Episode: "Royalty"
1998	The Wild Thornberrys	Elcio (voice)	Episode: "Only Child"
1999–2001	Ladies Man	Jimmy Stiles	30 episodes; also producer
2002	Bram & Alice	Bram	9 episodes
2003	Justice League	King Gustav (voice)	Episode: "Maid of Honor" Pt. 1
2005	Law & Order: Special Victims Unit	Gabriel Duvall	Episode: "Night"
2005	Law & Order: Trial by Jury	Gabriel Duvall	Episode: "Day"
2007	Monk	Peter Magneri	Episode: "Mr. Monk and the Naked Man"
2007	The Company	The Sorcerer	3 episodes
2010–11	Law & Order: LA	Det. Ricardo Morales	16 episodes
2010–12	Roger & Val Have Just Got In	Roger Stephenson	12 episodes
2010–12	The Life & Times of Tim	Chairman (voice)	2 episodes
2011	Harry's Law	Eric Sanders	3 episodes
2011	Late Late Show with Craig Ferguson	Geoff Peterson (voice)	3 episodes
2012	Kung Fu Panda: Legends of Awesomeness	Ke-Pa (voice)	Episode: "Enter the Dragon"
2012, 2015–16	Gravity Falls	Multi-Bear (voice)	3 episodes
2012–20	Robot Chicken	Lex Luthor / Various characters (voices)	7 episodes
2013	Monday Mornings	Dr. Harding Hooten	10 episodes
2013	Drunk History	Arthur Conan Doyle	Episode: "Detroit"
2014	Rick and Morty	Lucius Needful (voice)	Episode: "Something Ricked This Way Comes"
2014	Cosmos: A Spacetime Odyssey	Alhazen (voice)	Episode: "Hiding in the Light"
2014	Matador	Andrés Galan	13 episodes
2014	Wordgirl	Patrick Needlemeyer (voice)	Episode: "Putt with Honor"
2014–17	Penn Zero: Part-Time Hero	Rippen (voice)	53 episodes
2015	Show Me a Hero	Henry J. Spallone	6 episodes
2015	Axe Cop	Various characters (voice)	2 episodes
2015	Oscar's Hotel for Fantastical Creatures	Norbert (voice)	Episode: "Fishy Business"
2015	Long Live the Royals	Rupert / Neil (voice)	2 episodes
2016–18	DreamWorks Dragons	Viggo Grimborn (voice)	19 episodes
2016–17	Angie Tribeca	Dr. Edelweiss	Uncredited; 14 episodes
2016	Close to the Enemy	Harold Lindsay-Jones	7 episodes
2016, 2020	American Dad!	Tow Truck Driver / Kazim (voice)	2 episodes
2017	Feud: Bette and Joan	Robert Aldrich	6 episodes
2017	I'm Dying Up Here	Carl Veisor	Episode: "Pilot"
2017	Welcome to the Wayne	Albert Molina (voice)	3 episodes
2018–23	Summer Camp Island	Monster Under the Bed / Various characters (voices)	12 episodes
2018	I Feel Bad	Max	Episode: "My Kids Barely Know Their Culture"
2019	3Below: Tales of Arcadia	Archie (voice)	Episode: "A Glorious End, Part Two"
2019	Vampirina	Sir Ghoulgood (voice)	Episode: "Haunted Theater"
2020–21, 2024–25	Solar Opposites	The Duke (voice)	9 episodes
2020–22	Big City Greens	Cogburn (voice)	2 episodes
2020	Harley Quinn	Mr. Freeze, Stew (voices)	2 episodes
2020	Family Guy	Panamanian Man (voice)	Episode: "Coma Guy"
2020	Wizards: Tales of Arcadia	Archie (voice)	10 episodes
2020	Crossing Swords	Robin Hood (voice)	Episode: "Hot Tub Death Machine"
2020	Infinity Train	Chandelier (voice)	Episode: "The Debutante Ball Car"
2021, 2024	Monsters at Work	Professor Derek Knight (voice)	2 episodes
2021	Maya and the Three	Lord Mictlan (voice)	7 episodes
2022	Roar	Silas McCall	Episode: "The Girl Who Loved Horses"
2022	Three Pines	Inspecteur-chief Armand Gamache	8 episodes
2023	Praise Petey	Human Shih Tzu (voice)	4 episodes
2024	Star Wars: Skeleton Crew	Benjar Pranic (voice)	Episode: "Very Interesting, as an Astrogation Problem"
2024–25	Hamster & Gretel	Mordros the Annihilator (voice)	4 episodes
2025–present	Chibiverse	Multi-Bear, Snakey (voice)	2 episodes
2025	Blood of Zeus	Cronus (voice)	8 episodes
2026	Family Guy	David Attenborough, Dr. Snelling (voices)	Episode: "Dear Francis"
2026	Family Guy	Mr. Perez (voice)	Episode: "Phony Montana"
2026	The Boroughs	Samuel "Sam" Cooper	Main role

==== TV films and miniseries ====
Year	Title	Role	Notes
1982	Anyone for Denis?	Eric Catchpole	Police C.I.D. Flying Squad
1983	Meantime	John	
1985	Number One	D.C. Rogers	
1985	Angels in the Annexe	Mike Brittain	
1989	The Accountant	Lionel Ellerman	
1994	Requiem Apache	Hamish/Getaway Driver	
2001	Murder on the Orient Express	Hercule Poirot	
2009	Yes, Virginia	Francis Pharcellus Church (voice)	
2011	Innocent	Alejando "Sandy" Stern	
2012	Loving Miss Hatto	Barrie	
2014	The Normal Heart	Ben Weeks	
2016	Sister Cities	Mort	Also executive producer
2017	Hey Arnold!: The Jungle Movie	Lasombra (voice)	
2026	The Pitt	Patient (uncredited)	

=== Radio and audiobooks ===
Year	Title	Voice Role	Radio Station / Production Company
1985	Azari's Aerial Theatre	Azari	BBC Radio 3
1986	Where Are You, Wally	Albert	BBC Radio 4
1987	Aristophanes against the World	Dikaiopolis	BBC Radio 4
1988	After Every Dream	Zvi	BBC Radio 4
1989	Le Far West	Jacques Brel	BBC Radio 3
1989	Plaza Suite	A Waiter	BBC Radio 4
1990	Leaf by Niggle	Niggle	BBC Radio 5
1993	Black Box	Alexander Gideon	BBC Radio 3
1996	Species	Narrator	Soundlines Entertainment
1998	The Vampire Armand	Narrator	Penguin Random House AudioBooks
2000	Just Between Ourselves	Neil	L.A. Theatre Works
2001	The Lion in Winter	Henry Plantagenet	L.A. Theatre Works
2001	True West	Lee	L.A. Theatre Works
2002	The Berrybender Narratives (Volume 1,2,3)	Narrator	Simon & Schuster Audio
2003	Vieux Carré	Nightingale	BBC Radio 3
2004	The Berrybender Narratives (Volume 4)	Narrator	Simon & Schuster Audio
2004	The Intelligencer (Novel)	Narrator with Jan Maxwell	Simon & Schuster Audio
2006	The Pat Hobby Stories	Narrator	BBC Radio 4
2006	The Foreign Correspondent (Novel)	Narrator	HighBridge Audio
2006	Anna Karenina	Narrator	HighBridge Audio
2007–08	Kicking the Habit	Father Bertie	BBC Radio 4
2009	A Small Family Business	Jack	BBC Radio 3
2009	Moving Bodies	Narrator	BBC World Service
2009	A Pattern in Shrouds	Henry	BBC Radio 4
2011	England, Their England	Tommy Huggins	BBC Radio 4
2012	Electric Decade: Uncle Fred in the Springtime	Earl of Ickenham (Uncle Fred)	BBC Radio 4
2014	On Her Majesty's Secret Service	Ernst Stavro Blofeld	BBC Radio 4
2011	Copenhagen	Niels Bohr	L.A. Theatre Works
2011	The Illiad	Narrator	Simon & Schuster Audio
2015	A View from the Bridge	Eddie Carbone	BBC Radio 3
2016	Thunderball	Ernst Stavro Blofeld	BBC Radio 4
2016	Stoner	Narrator	Penguin Random House AudioBooks
2017	Leonardo Da Vinci	Narrator	Simon & Schuster Audio
2018	An Enemy of the People	Dr Thomas Stockmann	BBC Radio 4
2016	Fathers and Sons	Vassily / Nikolai	L.A. Theatre Works
2019	A Walk in the Woods	Andrey Botvinnik	L.A. Theatre Works
2021	The Murder on the Links	Hercule Poirot	L.A. Theatre Works
2025–26	1776	Benjamin Franklin	BBC Radio 4

=== Video games ===
Year	Title	Role	Notes
2004	Spider-Man 2	Otto Octavius / Doctor Octopus	
2014	The Elder Scrolls Online	Abnur Tharn	
2015	The Elder Scrolls Online: Tamriel Unlimited	Abnur Tharn	
2016	The Elder Scrolls Online: Gold Edition	Abnur Tharn	
2017	The Elder Scrolls Online: Morrowind	Abnur Tharn	
2017	Wilson's Heart	Bela Belascó	
2018	The Elder Scrolls Online: Summerset	Abnur Tharn	
2019	The Elder Scrolls Online: Elsweyr	Abnur Tharn	
2019	The Elder Scrolls Online: Dragonhold	Abnur Tharn	
2020	The Elder Scrolls Online: Greymoor	Abnur Tharn	
2021	The Elder Scrolls Online: Blackwood	Abnur Tharn	
2024	Indiana Jones and the Great Circle	Satipo	Likeness used only; role performed by Joe Hernandez-Kolski
