= Saint Judy =

- Film poster
- Directed by: Sean Hanish
- Screenplay by: Dmitry Portnoy
- Produced by: Paul Jaconi-Biery; Sean Hanish
- Starring: Michelle Monaghan; Leem Lubany; Common; Peter Krause; Ben Schnetzer; Waleed Zuaiter; Mykelti Williamson; Gabriel Bateman; Kevin Chapman; Aimee Garcia; Alfred Molina; Alfre Woodard; Fahim Fazli
- Cinematography: Richard Wong
- Edited by: Anita Brandt-Burgoyne
- Production company: Cannonball Productions
- Distributed by: Blue Fox Entertainment
- Release dates: September 22, 2018 (LAFF); March 1, 2019 (United States)
- Running time: 107 minutes
- Country: United States
- Language: English
- Box office: $96,212

Saint Judy is an American biographical drama film directed by Sean Hanish, starring Michelle Monaghan and Alfred Molina. Molina serves as an executive producer of the film. The screenplay was written by a former intern of Wood.

The story is about Judy Wood, an immigration attorney who changed the law on granting asylum in the United States to save the lives of women.

The film premiered at the 2018 LA Film Festival and was released on March 1, 2019, by Blue Fox Entertainment.

== Plot ==
Attorney Judy Wood moves with her son from New Mexico to Los Angeles so he can be closer to his dad, as they share joint custody. Originally a defense lawyer, she starts work in an immigration law office. Soon after starting there, Judy proposes taking on Afghanistani Asefa Ashwari's case who is seeking exile. Barely looking at the file, her boss Ray hands her a form for the woman to request two months to arrange to get her affairs in order so as to return to her country of origin.

Judy drives to the ICE detention center holding Asefa. When she tries to interview the detainee, she has been so heavily medicated she cannot respond to her. Judy appeals to the warden, requesting Asefa be taken off the drugs so they can communicate. Ray again shows little empathy.

While investigating the case, Judy realizes that Asefa came to the US seeking political asylum. She was being persecuted in Afghanistan for educating girls. To obtain a psychological evaluation for the woman, she secures a work visa for another refugee, a psychiatrist. Taking him to the Detention Center, he confirms that Asefa is being overmedicated and recommends that they gradually reduce her medication so they can discover her true mental state.

Judy continues to visit Asefa in the detention center, and each time she becomes more and more alert. On one visit she meets a woman visiting her husband who has also been detained. Judy offers to help. Through that family she gets more contacts with potential clients. Judy takes all of the new possible cases to the lawyer's office. Ray is unhappy with all of the extra cases. Getting frustrated, he fires her. So Judy opens her own office downtown.

Judy single-handedly changes United States asylum law to include women to be a part of the protected class. Wood's victory is believed by immigration advocates to have saved the lives of tens of thousands of female immigrants around the world, in particular Asefa Ashwari, a teacher from Afghanistan facing deportation and her win in the 9th Circuit. It depicts her dedication to her clients over her family.

== Cast ==
- Michelle Monaghan as Judy Wood
- Judith L. Wood as Herself (Cameo before credits)
- Leem Lubany as Asefa
- Common as Benjamin Adebayo
- Fahim Fazli as Taliban Leader
- Peter Krause as Matthew
- Ben Schnetzer as Parker
- Waleed Zuaiter as Omar
- Mykelti Williamson as Dikembe Mustafa
- Gabriel Bateman as Alex Wood
- Aimee Garcia as Celi
- Kevin Chapman as Officer King
- Gil Birmingham as Michael Bowman
- Alfred Molina as Ray Hernandez
- Alfre Woodard as Judge Benton

== Production ==
Principal photography began in May 2017 in Los Angeles.

== Reception ==
=== Box office ===
Saint Judy grossed $78,935 in the United States and Canada and $17,277 in other territories, for a worldwide total of $96,212.

=== Critical reception ===
On review aggregator Rotten Tomatoes, the film holds an approval rating of 67% based on 24 reviews, with an average rating of 7.3/10. On Metacritic, the film has a weighted average score of 51 out of 100, based on 7 critics, indicating "mixed or average reviews".

=== Festivals and awards ===
Saint Judy is nominated for an LA Muse award at the Los Angeles Film Festival 2018, Best International Film at London Raindance Film Festival 2018, and a Mind the Gap award at Mill Valley Film Festival 2018. Michelle Monaghan is nominated for Best Performance at London Raindance Film Festival 2018.
