= Sean Hanish =

American film writer, producer and director

Sean Hanish is an American film writer, producer and director best known for Saint Judy, Return to Zero and Sister Cities.

== Biography ==
Hanish attended the University of Wisconsin, first studying business and later switching to film. He completed his Master of Arts at the University of Southern California School of Cinema-Television.

His 2014 film, Return to Zero, was based on the true story of Hanish and his wife Kiley's experience with stillbirth. Return to Zero was Lifetime’s first ever Global Premiere Film which was seen by over 4 million people when it premiered in May 2014 on Lifetime in the USA, Canada, the UK, and Southeast Asia. Hanish was nominated for a WGA Award for the screenplay, and the film won the International Press Association's Satellite Award for Best Motion Picture Made for Television. Additionally, Minnie Driver was nominated for an Emmy for her role.

In 2016, he directed and produced the Lifetime television film Sister Cities. In 2019, he directed the feature film, Saint Judy. It was filmed in Los Angeles and premiered at the LA Film Festival.

Hanish also writes, directs, and produces commercials through his production company Cannonball Productions.
