= Mistresses (American TV series) season 4 =

Mistresses
- Season 4
- Season 4 promotional poster
- Starring: Yunjin Kim Rochelle Aytes Jes Macallan Brett Tucker Rob Mayes Tabrett Bethell
- No. of episodes: 13

Release
- Original network: ABC
- Original release: May 30 – September 6, 2016

Season chronology
- ← Previous; Season 3

The fourth and final season of the American television drama series Mistresses premiered on May 30, 2016, on ABC. The series is based on the UK series of the same name and was adapted by K.J. Steinberg, it stars Yunjin Kim, Rochelle Aytes, Jes Macallan and Tabrett Bethell as the four lead characters.

== Cast ==
=== Main cast ===
- Yunjin Kim as Dr. Karen Kim
- Rochelle Aytes as April Malloy
- Jes Macallan as Josslyn "Joss" Carver
- Brett Tucker as Harry Davis
- Rob Mayes as Marc Nickleby
- Tabrett Bethell as Kate Davis

=== Recurring cast ===
- Corinne Massiah as Lucy Malloy
- Jerry O'Connell as Robert
- Brian Gattas as Randy
- Navid Negahban as Jonathan Amadi
- Ian Harvie as Michael Hester
- Ella Thomas as Jackie
- Alanna Masterson as Lydia
- Camila Banus as Kylie
- David Sutcliffe as Adam
- Tia Mowry as Barbara Rutledge
- Lynn Whitfield as Marjorie
- Justin Hartley as Scott Trosman
- Haley Ramm as Stacey North

=== Guest cast ===
- Micky Shiloah as Reza
- Ed Quinn as Alec Adams
- Jarod Joseph as Wilson Corvo
- Jason George as Dominic Taylor
- Wilson Cruz as Dante
- Matthew Del Negro as Jacob
- Nathalie Kelley as Kristen Sorbonne
- Hina Abdullah as Mysterious "Karen Kim"

== Production ==
On September 25, 2015, ABC renewed Mistresses for a fourth season, consisting of 14 episodes, which began filming on February 27, 2016. On February 19, 2016, it was announced that Tabrett Bethell, who previously guest starred as Kate Davis in season two for one episode, returned in the remaining lead role during the fourth season from the second episode. Jerry O'Connell is set to recur this season as Robert, Karen's new nanny who also moonlights as an actor. O'Connell will also direct a few episodes later in the season. Tia Mowry will also recur as Barbara Rutledge, a literary agent who signs with Karen. Navid Negahban and Micky Shiloah will both recur this season. Negahban is set to play Jonathan Amadi, an uber-successful Persian businessman who helps finance Harry's business expansion; while Shiloah will recur as Jonathan's privileged nephew, Reza. Ian Harvie has also been tapped for the recurring role of Michael Hester, a rich financier who hires April to decorate his house. Ella Thomas will also recur throughout this season as Jackie, a fitness instructor that befriends Joss. David Sutcliffe will recur in the role of Adam, an extremely handsome, charming and confident suitor of Karen's. Wilson Cruz is also set to guest star this season as Dante, Harry's new personal shopper. Lynn Whitfield is set to return in the role of April's mother Marjorie, for a guest appearance.

== Episodes ==
No. overall	No. in season	Title	Directed by	Written by	Original release date	U.S. viewers (millions)
40	1	"The New Girls"	Chris Misiano	Josh Reims	May 30, 2016	2.94
41	2	"Mistaken Identity"	Chris Misiano	Jessica Lieberman & Molly Margraf	June 6, 2016	3.31
42	3	"Under Pressure"	Sharat Raju	Jordan Budde	June 20, 2016	2.89
43	4	"Blurred Lines"	Sharat Raju	Kiersten Van Horne	June 27, 2016	2.80
44	5	"Lean In"	Constantine Makris	Rina Mimoun	July 4, 2016	1.97
45	6	"What Happens in Vegas"	Constantine Makris	Justin Lo	July 11, 2016	2.97
46	7	"Survival of the Fittest"	John Scott	Sarah Tarkoff	August 2, 2016	2.42
47	8	"Bridge Over Troubled Water"	John Scott	Jessica Lieberman & Molly Margraf	August 8, 2016	2.07
48	9	"The Root of All Evil"	Jerry O'Connell	Justin Lo	August 15, 2016	2.10
49	10	"Confrontations"	Jerry O'Connell	Jordan Budde	August 22, 2016	2.45
50	11	"Fight or Flight"	Hanelle Culpepper	K.J. Steinberg	August 29, 2016	2.74
51	12	"Back to the Start"	Hanelle Culpepper	K.J. Steinberg	September 5, 2016	2.52
52	13	"The Show Must Go On"	John Scott	Story by : Josh Reims; Teleplay by : K.J. Steinberg & Rina Mimoun	September 6, 2016	2.57

== Ratings ==
U.S. ratings
No.	Episode	Air date	Time slot (EST)	Rating/share (18–49)	Viewers (m)
1	"The New Girls"	May 30, 2016	Monday; 10:00 PM	0.7/2	2.94
2	"Mistaken Identity"	June 6, 2016	Monday; 10:00 PM	0.8/3	3.31
3	"Under Pressure"	June 20, 2016	Monday; 10:00 PM	0.7/3	2.89
4	"Blurred Lines"	June 27, 2016	Monday; 10:00 PM	0.7/3	2.80
5	"Lean In"	July 4, 2016	Monday; 10:00 PM	0.4/2	1.97
6	"What Happens in Vegas"	July 11, 2016	Monday; 10:00 PM	0.7/3	2.97
7	"Survival of the Fittest"	August 2, 2016	Tuesday; 10:00 PM	0.6/3	2.42
8	"Bridge Over Troubled Water"	August 8, 2016	Monday; 10:00 PM	0.5/2	2.07
9	"The Root of All Evil"	August 15, 2016	Monday; 10:00 PM	0.5/2	2.10
10	"Confrontations"	August 22, 2016	Monday; 10:00 PM	0.6/2	2.45
11	"Fight or Flight"	August 29, 2016	Monday; 10:00 PM	0.6/2	2.74
12	"Back to the Start"	September 5, 2016	Monday; 10:00 PM	0.5/2	2.52
13	"The Show Must Go On"	September 6, 2016	Tuesday; 10:00 PM	0.6/2	2.57
