= Mistresses (American TV series) season 3 =

Mistresses
- Season 3
- Season 3 promotional poster
- Starring: Yunjin Kim Rochelle Aytes Jes Macallan Brett Tucker Rob Mayes Jennifer Esposito
- No. of episodes: 13

Release
- Original network: ABC
- Original release: June 18 – September 3, 2015

Season chronology
- ← Previous; Season 2 Next → Season 4

The third season of the American television drama series Mistresses premiered on June 18, 2015, on ABC. The series is based on the UK series of the same name and was adapted by K. J. Steinberg, it stars Yunjin Kim, Rochelle Aytes, Jes Macallan and Jennifer Esposito as the four lead characters.

== Cast ==
=== Main cast ===
- Yunjin Kim as Dr. Karen Kim
- Rochelle Aytes as April Malloy
- Jes Macallan as Josslyn "Joss" Carver
- Brett Tucker as Harry Davis
- Rob Mayes as Marc Nickleby
- Jennifer Esposito as Calista Raines

=== Recurring cast ===
- Corinne Massiah as Lucy Malloy
- Ed Quinn as Dr. Alec Adams
- Sonja Bennett as Vivian Adams
- Julius Fair as Scotty Nickleby
- Noam Jenkins as Luca Raines
- Jarod Joseph as Wilson Corvo
- Emmanuelle Vaugier as Niko
- Brian J. White as Blair Patterson
- Corey Sevier as David Hudson
- Carmel Amit as Ariella "Ari" Greenburg
- Christine Willes as Patty Deckler
- Kavan Smith as Ellis Boone
- Andrew Airlie as Father John
- Samantha Ferris as Detective Libby Whitehead
- Katie Messina as Roz

=== Guest stars ===
- Justin Hartley as Scott Trosman
- Kate Beahan as Miranda Nickleby
- Chloe Babcook as Eva Petrov
- Jason George as Dominic Taylor
- Jason Gerhardt as Zack Kilmer
- Rebeka Montoya as Antonia 'Toni' Ruiz
- Chrishell Stause as Yoga Woman
- Lynn Whitfield as Marjorie
- Ricky Whittle as Daniel Zamora
- Rocco DiSpirito as himself

== Production ==
On September 30, 2014, ABC renewed Mistresses for a third season and Alyssa Milano left the series after two seasons in Los Angeles, California. Jennifer Esposito also stars as the new co-lead as Calista Raines, as a creative director of a luxury fashion brand. However, she left the series on September 25, 2015, after the third season.

Rob Mayes then joined the series as new series regular Marc, Miranda's brother who moves in with April. Ed Quinn has booked the recurring role of Dr. Alec Adams, an internist at the hospital, whose wife is going through medical issues. Emmanuelle Vaugier will recur throughout this season as Niko, a tough new mixologist at Wunderbar and a thorn in Joss' side. Brian J. White is set to recur this season as Blair, the headmaster of the school Lucy attends, who takes a liking to April. Chrishell Stause will also guest star in the fifth episode as a woman April meets during hot yoga.

== Episodes ==
No. overall	No. in season	Title	Directed by	Written by	Original release date	U.S. viewers (millions)
27	1	"Gone Girl"	Constantine Makris	Rina Mimoun	June 18, 2015	3.79
28	2	"I'll Be Watching You"	Constantine Makris	K. J. Steinberg	June 18, 2015	3.79
29	3	"Odd Couples"	John Scott	Melissa Carter	June 25, 2015	3.31
30	4	"Into the Woods"	John Scott	Justin Lo	July 2, 2015	3.04
31	5	"Threesomes"	Holly Dale	Jordan Budde	July 9, 2015	3.49
32	6	"Love is an Open Door"	Holly Dale	Stacy Littlejohn	July 16, 2015	3.29
33	7	"The Best Laid Plans"	John Scott	Jerica Lieberman & Molly Margraf	July 23, 2015	2.94
34	8	"Murder She Wrote"	John Scott	Rina Mimoun	July 30, 2015	3.09
35	9	"Unreliable Witness"	Eric Laneuville	Jenna Richman	August 6, 2015	2.54
36	10	"What Could Have Been"	Eric Laneuville	Jordan Budde	August 13, 2015	2.98
37	11	"Guilt By Association"	Liz Allen	Melissa Carter	August 20, 2015	3.30
38	12	"Reasonable Doubt"	Liz Allen	Justin Lo	August 27, 2015	3.23
39	13	"Goodbye Girl"	John Scott	K. J. Steinberg	September 3, 2015	2.70

== Ratings ==
US ratings
No.	Episode	Air date	Time slot (EST)	Rating/share (18–49)	Viewers (m)
1	"Gone Girl"	June 18, 2015	Thursday; 9 pm	0.9/3	3.79
2	"I'll Be Watching You"	June 18, 2015	Thursday; 9 pm	0.9/3	3.79
3	"Odd Couples"	June 25, 2015	Thursday; 9 pm	0.7/3	3.31
4	"Into the Woods"	July 2, 2015	Thursday; 9 pm	0.6/3	3.04
5	"Threesomes"	July 9, 2015	Thursday; 9 pm	0.8/3	3.49
6	"Love is an Open Door"	July 16, 2015	Thursday; 9 pm	0.9/3	3.29
7	"The Best Laid Plans"	July 23, 2015	Thursday; 9 pm	0.7/3	2.94
8	"Murder She Wrote"	July 30, 2015	Thursday; 9 pm	0.7/3	3.09
9	"Unreliable Witness"	August 6, 2015	Thursday; 9 pm	0.6/2	2.54
10	"What Could Have Been"	August 13, 2015	Thursday; 9 pm	0.7/3	2.98
11	"Guilt By Association"	August 20, 2015	Thursday; 9 pm	0.8/3	3.30
12	"Reasonable Doubt"	August 27, 2015	Thursday; 9 pm	0.8/3	3.23
13	"Goodbye Girl"	September 3, 2015	Thursday; 9 pm	0.6/2	2.70
