= Mistresses (American TV series) season 2 =

Mistresses
- Season 2
- Season two promotional poster
- Starring: Alyssa Milano Yunjin Kim Rochelle Aytes Jes Macallan Brett Tucker Jason George
- No. of episodes: 13

Release
- Original network: ABC
- Original release: June 2 – September 1, 2014

Season chronology
- ← Previous; Season 1 Next → Season 3

The second season of the American television drama series Mistresses premiered on June 2, 2014, on ABC. The series is based on the U.K. series of the same name and was adapted by K.J. Steinberg, it stars Alyssa Milano before she left the series, Jes Macallan, Rochelle Aytes and Yunjin Kim as the four lead characters.

== Cast ==
=== Main cast ===
- Alyssa Milano as Savannah "Savi" Davis
- Yunjin Kim as Dr. Karen Kim
- Rochelle Aytes as April Malloy
- Jes Macallan as Josslyn "Joss" Carver
- Brett Tucker as Harry Davis
- Jason George as Dominic Taylor

=== Recurring cast ===
- Justin Hartley as Scott Trosman
- Catherine Kim as Anna Choi
- Ricky Whittle as Daniel Zamora
- Corinne Massiah as Lucy Malloy
- Rebeka Montoya as Antonia 'Toni' Ruiz
- Jason Gerhardt as Zack Kilmer
- Matthew Del Negro as Jacob Pollack
- Jason Gray-Stanford as FBI Agent Adam Thomas
- Brian Hallisay as Ben Odell
- Helena Mattsson as Greta Jager

=== Guest stars ===
- Joseph May as Mickey
- Ashley Newbrough as Kyra
- Krista Allen as Janine Winterbaum
- Elaine Hendrix as Samantha
- Dondre Whitfield as Paul Malloy
- Soleil Moon Frye as Herself
- Penelope Ann Miller as Elizabeth Grey
- Tabrett Bethell as Kate Davis
- John Heard as Bruce Davis

== Production ==
On September 25, 2013, ABC renewed Mistresses for a second season. Jason Gerhardt appeared this season as Zack, a lost soul that has a unique connection with Savi. Rebeka Montoya and Catherine Kim recurred this season, with Montoya in the role of Toni, a lawyer who is set to stir things up, while Kim appeared as Anna Choi, Karen's new patient. Joseph May joined the series in the recurring role of Mickey, the gay friend and business associate of April. Also, Krista Allen guest starred as Janine Winterbaum, a housewife from Beverly Hills who hires Harry and Joss to cater an event. Soleil Moon Frye guest stars as herself, in an episode where Joss attempts to acquire her as a celebrity client in her new party planning business. Justin Hartley signed onto the role of Scott, a new love interest of Joss. Helena Mattsson recurred as Greta Jager, a European supermodel who hires Joss as her restaurant's event planner. John Heard guest starred as Bruce Davis, the estranged father of Savi.

== Episodes ==
No. overall	No. in season	Title	Directed by	Written by	Original release date	U.S. viewers (millions)
14	1	"Rebuild"	Ron Lagomarsino	Rina Mimoun	June 2, 2014	4.66
8 months later, Savi, after cheating death, makes the most of her second chance. Karen struggles to rebound from loss, both personal and professional. April's life gets interesting when an old friend returns and pushes her to make some changes. Joss tries her hand at a new job, party planner to wealthy Angelenos.
15	2	"Boundaries"	Ron Lagomarsino	K.J. Steinberg	June 9, 2014	3.64
Savi must share an office with a new attorney who doesn't respect her personal space. Meanwhile, April begins an affair with an artist; Joss and Harry quarrel about a party they're planning for a rich housewife; and Karen testifies at a parole hearing.
16	3	"Open House"	John Scott	Josh Reims	June 16, 2014	3.72
April must host a party for the parents at Lucy's school, so Mickey organizes a memorable event. Meanwhile, conflict erupts between Savi and Harry when they prepare to sell their home; and Toni makes life at work difficult for Savi.
17	4	"Friends With Benefits"	John Scott	Jenna Richman	June 23, 2014	3.62
Joss attends a charity event to acquire new clients, but she finds a potential suitor instead. Meanwhile, Savi forms an unexpected connection with a new man; April has Daniel meet her friends; and Karen's bad luck in the dating game leaves her blue.
18	5	"Playing With Fire"	Constantine Makris	Justin W. Lo	June 30, 2014	4.09
Savi exposes a reckless side when cavorting with Zack. Meanwhile, Karen tries to curb her new addiction; Scott opens up to Joss about his fantasy; April hears upsetting news about Daniel; and Dom deals with the fallout of unmasking his romance with Savi.
19	6	"What Do You Really Want"	Constantine Makris	Jordan Budde	July 7, 2014	3.75
Joss gets surprising news from Harry. Elsewhere, Karen's secret life becomes a problem when she meets a man she finds intriguing; April turns down a dinner invitation while Daniel's away; and Savi has a revelation prior to finalizing her divorce.
20	7	"Why Do Fools Fall in Love?"	Ron Underwood	Josh Reims	July 14, 2014	3.71
April braces herself for Daniel's response when she finally confronts him to come clean. Joss finds that Scott's work as a plastic surgeon is testing the trust in their relationship. Dom catches Savi in a lie about her friend Zack and suggests they all meet. Jacob tells Karen he wants to make a go of it, but first must take care of another situation.
21	8	"An Affair to Surrender"	Ron Underwood	Justin W. Lo	July 21, 2014	3.74
Savi bids adieu to her house with help from her pals. Meanwhile, Joss plots to keep Harry in the U.S.; Karen faces a challenging predicament regarding Jacob and her client; and April's roles as a mom and a mistress result in unexpected conflict.
22	9	"Coming Clean"	Tara Nicole Weyr	Jerica Lieberman & Molly Kate Margraf	August 4, 2014	3.46
April's haunted by her past, as well as by a mysterious man. Meanwhile, Savi contacts her estranged father; Karen finds it difficult to get Anna to be honest; and Toni shares some news with Dom.
23	10	"Charades"	Tara Nicole Weyr	Jenna Richman	August 11, 2014	3.57
April discovers who's been stalking her. Meanwhile, Karen volunteers to assist Anna; Toni's hidden agenda is revealed, and it affects Savi and Dom; and Harry rattles Joss' confidence as she prepares to meet Scott's large family.
24	11	"Choices"	Michael Grossman	Jordan Budde	August 18, 2014	3.36
April deals with disloyalty in her life. Meanwhile, Joss shares a surprising revelation; Karen receives a tempting offer from Jacob; and Dom wants to turn the tables on Toni.
25	12	"Surprise"	Michael Grossman	Rina Mimoun	August 25, 2014	3.23
As April works with the FBI to help them find Paul, she tries to keep Lucy in the dark about what's going on between her and Daniel. Meanwhile, a former lover has startling news for Karen, who ends up doing some soul-searching; Savi's "real" date with Zack takes a turn for the unexpected; and Joss has a falling-out with Harry over his romancing their boss.
26	13	"'Til Death Do Us Part"	John Scott	K.J. Steinberg	September 1, 2014	3.74
In the second-season finale, Joss plans her engagement party as Scott arranges another surprise for her. Meanwhile, Karen awaits some test results; April turns to Daniel to protect her and Lucy; and Savi considers revealing that she's changed her mind.

== Ratings ==
U.S. ratings
No.	Episode	Air date	Time slot (EST)	Rating/Share (18–49)	Viewers (m)
1	"Rebuild"	June 2, 2014	Monday; 10:00 PM	1.2/4	4.66
2	"Boundaries"	June 9, 2014	Monday; 10:00 PM	0.9/3	3.64
3	"Open House"	June 16, 2014	Monday; 10:00 PM	1.0/3	3.72
4	"Friends With Benefits"	June 23, 2014	Monday; 10:00 PM	1.0/3	3.62
5	"Playing With Fire"	June 30, 2014	Monday; 10:00 PM	1.1/3	4.09
6	"What Do You Really Want"	July 7, 2014	Monday; 10:00 PM	0.9/3	3.75
7	"Why Do Fools Fall in Love?"	July 14, 2014	Monday; 10:00 PM	1.0/3	3.71
8	"An Affair to Surrender"	July 21, 2014	Monday; 10:00 PM	1.0/3	3.74
9	"Coming Clean"	August 4, 2014	Monday; 10:00 PM	0.9/3	3.46
10	"Charades"	August 11, 2014	Monday; 10:00 PM	1.0/3	3.57
11	"Choices"	August 18, 2014	Monday; 10:00 PM	0.8/2	3.36
12	"Surprise"	August 25, 2014	Monday; 10:00 PM	0.9/3	3.23
13	"'Til Death Do Us Part"	September 1, 2014	Monday; 10:00 PM	0.9/3	3.74
