= Mistresses (American TV series) season 1 =

Season of television series

Mistresses
- Season 1
- Season one promotional poster
- Starring: Alyssa Milano Yunjin Kim Rochelle Aytes Jes Macallan Brett Tucker Jason George Erik Stocklin
- No. of episodes: 13

Release
- Original network: ABC
- Original release: June 3 – September 9, 2013

Season chronology
- Next → Season 2

The first season of the American television drama series Mistresses premiered on June 3, 2013, and concluded on September 9, 2013, on ABC. The series is based on the U.K. series of the same name and was adapted by K.J. Steinberg. Mistresses stars Alyssa Milano, Jes Macallan, Rochelle Aytes and Yunjin Kim as the four lead characters.

== Storylines ==
=== Savi ===
As the season begins, Savi and her husband Harry are unsuccessfully trying to get pregnant, due to Harry's sperm morphology. This causes Harry to emotionally pull away from Savi, which leads her into sleeping with her co-worker Dominic. Devastated over what she had done, Savi reveals the affair to her friends. However, April is disgusted and turns her back on Savi, adding to her pain. Savi begins to avoid Dominic at work, and even goes to her boss to get off of a case she shares with him. However, the plan backfires when Dom is reassigned instead. After this, April makes up with a distraught Savi.

Shortly after, Savi discovers that she is pregnant, but she is unsure who the father of the baby is. Savi decides to secretly get a paternity test to find out the real father of the baby. When Harry finds out about her pregnancy, he is initially happy, until Savi reveals to him that she had an affair with Dom. After Harry moves out, Savi informs Dom that she is pregnant, but she fully intends to fix her marriage with Harry and raise the baby with him, whether it is Dom's or not. Adding to this, when Joss finds out that Savi told only Karen and April about her affair and pregnancy, she is so hurt that she moves out.

Still hurt over his wife's betrayal, Harry informs Savi that if the baby isn't his, he will be asking for a divorce. Due to this, Savi decides to hide the paternity test when she receives the results in the mail. However, when Savi and Joss patch up their relationship, Savi entrusts Joss with holding on to the paternity test results. With Harry out of the house, Savi begins to rely on Dominic, and the two begin to get closer. Unbeknownst to Savi, Harry steals the test results from Joss and discovers that the father of Savi's baby is indeed Dominic.

When Joss takes Savi away to Palm Springs for her birthday, Savi decides that whoever the father is, that is the person she should be with. So, as she heads back to L.A. to retrieve the envelope, she gets into a car accident. Savi and her unborn baby survive the accident, only to discover that even though Harry knows that Dom's the father, he still wants to be with Savi and help her raise the baby. When Dom learns he is the father, he fully intends to win Savi over. Unfortunately, before Savi can answer who she wants to be with, she falls unconscious and begins coding.

=== Karen ===
After her patient, Thomas Grey, reveals that he is dying of lung cancer and that he has been in love with her for a year, Karen begins having an affair with him. To help him end his life when the pain becomes too much, Karen prescribes Thomas fatal doses of morphine, which his wife, Elizabeth, helps to administrate. The insurance company begins to investigate Thomas' death, going so far as to approach Karen for the notes from her sessions with Thomas. However, Karen had destroyed anything relating to Thomas being her patient.

While grieving his father's death, Thomas' son Sam turns to Karen for advice as he has discovered that his father was having an affair. Even though Savi advises Karen to cut all ties with the Grey Family, Karen begins helping Sam. Things take a dangerous turn after Sam falls in love with Karen and begins stalking her.

When the insurance company gets even closer to the truth in their investigation, Elizabeth asks Karen to forge notes stating that Thomas was suicidal. Unbeknownst to Karen, Elizabeth is setting her up in an attempt to ruin her career and reputation to exact revenge for sleeping with her husband. When Elizabeth uses the falsified notes to sue Karen for the wrongful death of Thomas, Sam steps in and hires an attorney to help Karen in the suit. He even agrees to provide an alibi for Karen for the night of Thomas' death, which leads to the two having sex. During the deposition for the suit, Sam turns on Karen and decides to be his mother's alibi instead. Even after being brutally honest, the suit against Karen is dismissed. However, the State Licensing Board suspends her license for six months, because Karen's co-worker Jacob had alerted them to Karen's affair with her patient.

Angered over the dismissal of her suit against Karen, Elizabeth decided the only way to get revenge is to hold Karen at gunpoint and have her kill herself the same way Thomas died. However, when Sam realizes what his mother is up to, he races over to Karen's to save her. After a tussle between Elizabeth, Karen and Sam, someone is shot.

=== April ===
April is the single mother of a young daughter, who has been widowed three years prior after her husband Paul, went missing in a boat accident. At her friends' advice, she decides to jump back in the dating pool with a single father, Richard. However, things become complicated when Paul's mistress, Miranda, shows up with the child she had with April's husband, and begins blackmailing April for money.

After working out a payment plan to satisfy Miranda, April attempts to move on with her life, only for it to be rocked again with the revelation that her thought-to-be-dead husband is actually alive. When April confronts Paul, he informs her that the reason he faked his death was because he had lost his job and that the insurance money from his death would leave April with some money. Paul had been living with Miranda the whole time, and Miranda had been keeping tabs on April's finances to blackmail her.

Paul's return causes Miranda to stop blackmailing April, and move back to Florida. April demands that Paul go with her, but he decides to stay so he can patch things up with April and so he can see their daughter, Lucy. When Richard finds out about Paul's decision to stay in town, he decides to talk Paul into leaving. Things get out of control and ends with April breaking up with Richard. Shortly afterwards, Richard and April rekindle their relationship. However, after Lucy temporarily goes missing, April turns to Paul for comfort which rekindles old feelings for her not-so-late husband.

Left to choose between her relationship with Richard or rekindling her romance with Paul, April decides that she should give Paul another chance and breaks up with Richard for good. However, after receiving a phone call from Miranda begging April to have Paul call his son, April tells Paul to go back to Florida.

=== Joss ===
Joss has been having an affair with her boss. However, she breaks it off with him after he tries to get more serious with her. Later, Joss meets new client Alex and strikes up a very close friendship with her. Shortly afterward, Joss finds out that her company has been bought out by Olivier, whom Joss can't seem to crack with her charm.

Unintentionally, Joss convinces Alex to break up with her long-term girlfriend, Sally. This causes both Alex and Joss to get even closer, culminating in the two engaging in a friends-with-benefits relationship. Alex decides that she can't continue with this arrangement, so Joss and Alex begin dating. However, Joss finds it hard to stay away from men and cheats on Alex with her boss, Olivier. The two then break up, realizing that Joss couldn't commit to only women.

== Cast ==
=== Main cast ===
- Alyssa Milano as Savannah "Savi" Davis
- Yunjin Kim as Dr. Karen Kim
- Rochelle Aytes as April Malloy
- Jes Macallan as Josslyn "Joss" Carver
- Brett Tucker as Harry Davis
- Erik Stocklin as Sam Grey
- Jason George as Dominic Taylor

=== Recurring cast ===
- Corinne Massiah as Lucy Malloy
- Cameron Bender as Richard
- Penelope Ann Miller as Elizabeth Grey
- Shannyn Sossamon as Alex
- Mike Dopud as Olivier Dubois
- Matthew Del Negro as Jacob Pollock
- Dondré T. Whitfield as Paul Malloy
- Kate Beahan as Miranda Nickleby
- Gary Dourdan as Anthony Newsome
- Stacy Barnhisel as Lila
- Tory Mussett as Sally
- Kelly Smith as Mona

=== Guest stars ===
- Ashley Newbrough as Kyra
- Tehmina Sunny as Natalie Wade
- John Schneider as Thomas Grey
- JoBeth Williams as Janet
- Mimi Kennedy as Dr. Susannah Ayers

== Production ==
In February 2012, ABC announced that it had green-lighted Mistresses with a direct-to-series order and a planned summer 2013 airdate. Thirteen episodes have been ordered. The pilot episode was written by K.J. Steinberg and directed by Cherie Nowlan, which had previously been under consideration for a pilot order for ABC's fall 2012 schedule.

== Episodes ==
No. overall	No. in season	Title	Directed by	Written by	Original release date	U.S. viewers (millions)
1	1	"Pilot"	Cherie Nowlan	Teleplay by : K. J. Steinberg	June 3, 2013	4.40
As Savannah and her husband are faced with fertility issues, Savannah finds herself attracted to a flirtatious colleague; recent widow April becomes convinced that her husband is actually still alive; Karen deals with the ramifications of an affair.
2	2	"The Morning After"	Chris Misiano	Rina Mimoun	June 10, 2013	4.22
Karen thinks Savi should hold off on telling Harry about her night with Dominic; April investigates a claim that her late husband, Paul, had another life; Joss befriends a new client; Karen agrees to meet with Sam.
3	3	"Breaking and Entering"	Ron Lagomarsino	K.J. Steinberg	June 17, 2013	3.76
Tensions rise between Savi and Dom; Joss gets an impossible work assignment; the Grey family's dysfunctional orbit continues to pull at Karen.
4	4	"A Kiss Is Just a Kiss?"	David Paymer	Chad Gomez Creasey & Dara Resnik Creasey	June 24, 2013	3.57
Savi discovers she's pregnant; Joss befriends a real estate client; Karen continues her relationship with Sam Grey.
5	5	"Decisions, Decisions"	Cherie Nowlan	Jordan Budde	July 1, 2013	3.62
Savi must hide her pregnancy from Harry as she anxiously waits for paternity test results; Joss and Alex's friendship takes an interesting turn; a private investigator asks Karen about her lover's death.
6	6	"Payback"	Eric Laneuville	Josh Reims	July 8, 2013	3.85
Harry resists Savi's efforts to make things right; someone breaks into Karen's office; April and Richard's relationship heats up; Olivier makes life difficult for Joss.
7	7	"All In"	John Scott	Jenna Richman	July 15, 2013	3.47
Joss, terribly hurt that Savi hid her pregnancy and her illicit affair from her, moves in with April; Harry and Dominic angrily face off at a social event; Karen meets up again with Detective Newsome, but this time it's personal; and April struggles to put memories of her dead husband behind her so she can move on with a relationship with Richard.
8	8	"Ultimatum"	Holly Dale	Justin W. Lo	July 22, 2013	3.95
Savi fights for her marriage, regardless of the baby's paternity; April finds out that Paul is actually still alive; Joss and Alex's feelings grow stronger even though Joss isn't the 'relationship type'; Somebody breaks into Karen's office.
9	9	"Guess Who's Coming to Dinner"	Tawnia McKiernan	David Folwell	July 29, 2013	3.96
Savi and Joss's mother, Janet, comes to town much to Savi's disbelief. April and Richard become official, however April continues to struggle with telling Richard about Paul being alive. Karen hires a private detective to look into Elizabeth's past. Savi gives Joss her paternal test results to hold onto. Karen gets served for the wrongful death of Thomas Grey.
10	10	"Indecent Proposals"	Bobby Roth	Chad Gomez Creasey & Dara Resnik Creasey	August 19, 2013	3.17
As single mom-to-be Savi begins to grasp that Harry may never be coming back, Dom offers her a shoulder to lean on; April is furious when Paul shows up at Lucy's school and she shares her frustration with Richard; Olivier asks Joss to help him convince a couple that L.A. is a good place to live; Karen finds out she needs an alibi for the night Thomas Grey died.
11	11	"Full Disclosure"	Jeff Bleckner	Josh Reims	August 26, 2013	3.46
Savi confesses to Joss that she had always had feelings for Dominic but she just tried to push them away; Joss and Alex must face the truth about their relationship; Karen is being put in the middle of an extreme crossfire when she has to face off with Elizabeth and Sam Grey; Harry tries to find out who is the father of Savi's baby; April makes a huge decision.
12	12	"When One Door Closes..."	Constantine Makris	Rina Mimoun	September 2, 2013	4.05
The judge delivers a shocking ruling in Grey vs. Kim and even more trouble on the horizon for Karen; Paul helps a frantic April search for Lucy after the school reports that she's gone missing; Joss tries to salvage her relationship with Alex; Savi is receptive to Dom's advances, and accepts the fact that Harry is no longer part of her life, until she learns some disturbing news about the state of Harry's restaurant.
13	13	"I Choose You"	Allison Liddi-Brown	K.J. Steinberg	September 9, 2013	3.91
The girls (Karen, Joss and April) are planning a casual birthday party for Savi but the whole thing turns out to be a disaster in the end where hearts break and lives are being put into unusual circumstances.

== Ratings ==
=== U.S. ratings ===
No.	Episode	Air date	Time slot (EST)	Rating/Share (18–49)	Viewers (m)
1	"Pilot"	June 3, 2013	Monday; 10:00 P.M.	1.2/3	4.40
2	"The Morning After"	June 10, 2013	Monday; 10:00 P.M.	1.4/4	4.22
3	"Breaking and Entering"	June 17, 2013	Monday; 10:00 P.M.	1.2/3	3.76
4	"A Kiss Is Just a Kiss?"	June 24, 2013	Monday; 10:00 P.M.	1.1/3	3.57
5	"Decisions, Decisions"	July 1, 2013	Monday; 10:00 P.M.	1.1/3	3.62
6	"Payback"	July 8, 2013	Monday; 10:00 P.M.	1.2/3	3.85
7	"All In"	July 15, 2013	Monday; 10:00 P.M.	1.0/3	3.47
8	"Ultimatum"	July 22, 2013	Monday; 10:00 P.M.	1.2/3	3.95
9	"Guess Who's Coming to Dinner"	July 29, 2013	Monday; 10:00 P.M.	1.2/4	3.96
10	"Indecent Proposals"	August 19, 2013	Monday; 10:00 P.M.	0.9/3	3.17
11	"Full Disclosure"	August 26, 2013	Monday; 9:00 P.M.	1.0/3	3.46
12	"When One Door Closes..."	September 2, 2013	Monday; 9:00 P.M.	1.4/4	4.05
13	"I Choose You"	September 9, 2013	Monday; 9:00 P.M.	1.1/3	3.91
