= List of Mistresses (American TV series) episodes =

Mistresses is an American drama television series, which premiered on ABC on June 3, 2013. This is an adaption by K.J. Steinberg, of the 2008–10 British series of the same name. The series stars Alyssa Milano, Rochelle Aytes, Yunjin Kim, Jes Macallan, Jennifer Esposito and Tabrett Bethell, as a close group of female friends whose lives are complicated by illicit and complex relationships and situations. On September 9, 2016, ABC cancelled the series after four seasons.

A total of 52 episodes of Mistresses had aired over four seasons.

== Series overview ==
Season	Episodes	Originally released	
Season	Episodes	First released	Last released
1	13	June 3, 2013	September 9, 2013
2	13	June 2, 2014	September 1, 2014
3	13	June 18, 2015	September 3, 2015
4	13	May 30, 2016	September 6, 2016

== Episodes ==
=== Season 1 (2013) ===
No. overall	No. in season	Title	Directed by	Written by	Original release date	U.S. viewers (millions)
1	1	"Pilot"	Cherie Nowlan	Teleplay by : K. J. Steinberg	June 3, 2013	4.40
2	2	"The Morning After"	Chris Misiano	Rina Mimoun	June 10, 2013	4.22
3	3	"Breaking and Entering"	Ron Lagomarsino	K.J. Steinberg	June 17, 2013	3.76
4	4	"A Kiss Is Just a Kiss?"	David Paymer	Chad Gomez Creasey & Dara Resnik Creasey	June 24, 2013	3.57
5	5	"Decisions, Decisions"	Cherie Nowlan	Jordan Budde	July 1, 2013	3.62
6	6	"Payback"	Eric Laneuville	Josh Reims	July 8, 2013	3.85
7	7	"All In"	John Scott	Jenna Richman	July 15, 2013	3.47
8	8	"Ultimatum"	Holly Dale	Justin W. Lo	July 22, 2013	3.95
9	9	"Guess Who's Coming to Dinner"	Tawnia McKiernan	David Folwell	July 29, 2013	3.96
10	10	"Indecent Proposals"	Bobby Roth	Chad Gomez Creasey & Dara Resnik Creasey	August 19, 2013	3.17
11	11	"Full Disclosure"	Jeff Bleckner	Josh Reims	August 26, 2013	3.46
12	12	"When One Door Closes..."	Constantine Makris	Rina Mimoun	September 2, 2013	4.05
13	13	"I Choose You"	Allison Liddi-Brown	K.J. Steinberg	September 9, 2013	3.91

=== Season 2 (2014) ===
No. overall	No. in season	Title	Directed by	Written by	Original release date	U.S. viewers (millions)
14	1	"Rebuild"	Ron Lagomarsino	Rina Mimoun	June 2, 2014	4.66
15	2	"Boundaries"	Ron Lagomarsino	K.J. Steinberg	June 9, 2014	3.64
16	3	"Open House"	John Scott	Josh Reims	June 16, 2014	3.72
17	4	"Friends With Benefits"	John Scott	Jenna Richman	June 23, 2014	3.62
18	5	"Playing With Fire"	Constantine Makris	Justin W. Lo	June 30, 2014	4.09
19	6	"What Do You Really Want"	Constantine Makris	Jordan Budde	July 7, 2014	3.75
20	7	"Why Do Fools Fall in Love?"	Ron Underwood	Josh Reims	July 14, 2014	3.71
21	8	"An Affair to Surrender"	Ron Underwood	Justin W. Lo	July 21, 2014	3.74
22	9	"Coming Clean"	Tara Nicole Weyr	Jerica Lieberman & Molly Kate Margraf	August 4, 2014	3.46
23	10	"Charades"	Tara Nicole Weyr	Jenna Richman	August 11, 2014	3.57
24	11	"Choices"	Michael Grossman	Jordan Budde	August 18, 2014	3.36
25	12	"Surprise"	Michael Grossman	Rina Mimoun	August 25, 2014	3.23
26	13	"'Til Death Do Us Part"	John Scott	K.J. Steinberg	September 1, 2014	3.74

=== Season 3 (2015) ===
No. overall	No. in season	Title	Directed by	Written by	Original release date	U.S. viewers (millions)
27	1	"Gone Girl"	Constantine Makris	Rina Mimoun	June 18, 2015	3.79
28	2	"I'll Be Watching You"	Constantine Makris	K. J. Steinberg	June 18, 2015	3.79
29	3	"Odd Couples"	John Scott	Melissa Carter	June 25, 2015	3.31
30	4	"Into the Woods"	John Scott	Justin Lo	July 2, 2015	3.04
31	5	"Threesomes"	Holly Dale	Jordan Budde	July 9, 2015	3.49
32	6	"Love is an Open Door"	Holly Dale	Stacy Littlejohn	July 16, 2015	3.29
33	7	"The Best Laid Plans"	John Scott	Jerica Lieberman & Molly Margraf	July 23, 2015	2.94
34	8	"Murder She Wrote"	John Scott	Rina Mimoun	July 30, 2015	3.09
35	9	"Unreliable Witness"	Eric Laneuville	Jenna Richman	August 6, 2015	2.54
36	10	"What Could Have Been"	Eric Laneuville	Jordan Budde	August 13, 2015	2.98
37	11	"Guilt By Association"	Liz Allen	Melissa Carter	August 20, 2015	3.30
38	12	"Reasonable Doubt"	Liz Allen	Justin Lo	August 27, 2015	3.23
39	13	"Goodbye Girl"	John Scott	K. J. Steinberg	September 3, 2015	2.70

=== Season 4 (2016) ===
No. overall	No. in season	Title	Directed by	Written by	Original release date	U.S. viewers (millions)
40	1	"The New Girls"	Chris Misiano	Josh Reims	May 30, 2016	2.94
41	2	"Mistaken Identity"	Chris Misiano	Jessica Lieberman & Molly Margraf	June 6, 2016	3.31
42	3	"Under Pressure"	Sharat Raju	Jordan Budde	June 20, 2016	2.89
43	4	"Blurred Lines"	Sharat Raju	Kiersten Van Horne	June 27, 2016	2.80
44	5	"Lean In"	Constantine Makris	Rina Mimoun	July 4, 2016	1.97
45	6	"What Happens in Vegas"	Constantine Makris	Justin Lo	July 11, 2016	2.97
46	7	"Survival of the Fittest"	John Scott	Sarah Tarkoff	August 2, 2016	2.42
47	8	"Bridge Over Troubled Water"	John Scott	Jessica Lieberman & Molly Margraf	August 8, 2016	2.07
48	9	"The Root of All Evil"	Jerry O'Connell	Justin Lo	August 15, 2016	2.10
49	10	"Confrontations"	Jerry O'Connell	Jordan Budde	August 22, 2016	2.45
50	11	"Fight or Flight"	Hanelle Culpepper	K.J. Steinberg	August 29, 2016	2.74
51	12	"Back to the Start"	Hanelle Culpepper	K.J. Steinberg	September 5, 2016	2.52
52	13	"The Show Must Go On"	John Scott	Story by : Josh Reims; Teleplay by : K.J. Steinberg & Rina Mimoun	September 6, 2016	2.57

== Ratings ==
Mistresses : U.S. viewers per episode (millions)

Season	Episode number												
Season	1	2	3	4	5	6	7	8	9	10	11	12	13
1	4.40	4.22	3.76	3.57	3.62	3.85	3.47	3.95	3.96	3.17	3.46	4.05	3.91
2	4.66	3.64	3.72	3.62	4.09	3.75	3.71	3.74	3.46	3.57	3.36	3.23	3.74
3	3.79	3.79	3.31	3.04	3.49	3.29	2.94	3.09	2.54	2.98	3.30	3.23	2.70
4	2.94	3.31	2.89	2.80	1.97	2.97	2.42	2.07	2.10	2.45	2.74	2.52	2.57

Audience measurement performed by Nielsen Media Research
