= Dondré Whitfield =

American actor (born 1969)

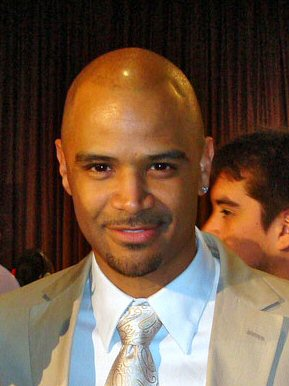
- Whitfield in 2008
- Born: Dondré Terrell Whitfield; May 27, 1969 (age 56); Brooklyn, New York City, U.S.
- Occupation: Actor
- Years active: 1985–present
- Spouse: Salli Richardson (m. 2002)
- Children: 2

Dondré Terrell Whitfield (born May 27, 1969) is an American actor. He began his career appearing in a recurring role as Robert Foreman on the NBC sitcom The Cosby Show (1985–87), before playing Terrence Frye in the ABC Daytime soap opera, All My Children (1991–94). He received three Daytime Emmy Award for Outstanding Younger Actor in a Drama Series nominations for his performance on All My Children.

Whitfield had starring role in a number of short-lived sitcoms, include The Crew (1995–96), Between Brothers (1997–99), and Hidden Hills (2002–03). He also has appeared in a number of films, such as Two Can Play That Game (2001), The Salon (2004), Pastor Brown (2009), and Middle of Nowhere (2012). In 2015, Whitfield joined the cast of BET reality comedy series Real Husbands of Hollywood, and in 2016 began starring in the Oprah Winfrey Network drama series, Queen Sugar.

== Career ==
Whitfield began his television career appearing in a recurring role on the NBC sitcom The Cosby Show as Robert Foreman (the love interest of Tempestt Bledsoe's character Vanessa Huxtable). He later had a two year-run on the NBC daytime soap opera, Another World. From 1991 to 1994, Whitfield portrayed Terrence Frye in the ABC Daytime soap opera, All My Children. The role earned him three nominations for the Daytime Emmy Award for Outstanding Younger Actor in a Drama Series, and two Soap Opera Digest Award nominations.

After leaving daytime television, Whitfield starred in the short-lived Fox sitcom The Crew (1995–1996). In 1997, he starred alongside Kadeem Hardison in another short-lived sitcom, Between Brothers. He had dramatic role in the 2000 UPN series Secret Agent Man, which was cancelled after one season. From 2002 to 2003, he starred alongside Tamara Taylor in another short-lived sitcom, Hidden Hills on NBC. From 2001 to 2002, Whitfield had a recurring role on the UPN sitcom Girlfriends. He has also appeared on The Jamie Foxx Show, NYPD Blue, Strong Medicine, Ghost Whisperer, CSI: Miami, Cold Case, and Grey's Anatomy.

On film, Whitfield has appeared opposite Vivica A. Fox in Two Can Play That Game (2001), and The Salon (2004). He co-starred in White Man's Burden (1995), Mr. 3000 (2003), and Middle of Nowhere (2012). He has appeared with his wife Salli Richardson in the film Pastor Brown (2009), and guest-starred on Stitchers and Eureka (in which he played Richardson's on-screen brother). Whitfield has also had recurring roles on Make It or Break It and Mistresses (as Rochelle Aytes' character's husband). In 2015, he joined the cast of the BET reality comedy series Real Husbands of Hollywood.

In 2016, Whitfield was cast in the Oprah Winfrey Network drama series, Queen Sugar, produced by Ava DuVernay and Oprah Winfrey. For his role as Remy Newell, he received a nomination for Outstanding Supporting Actor in a Drama Series at the 49th NAACP Image Awards.

== Personal life ==
Whitfield was born in Brooklyn, New York, and attended the Performing Arts High School in New York City.

In 2002, Whitfield married actress Salli Richardson. They have a daughter and a son.

== Filmography ==
=== Film ===
Year	Title	Role	Notes
1988	Bright Lights, Big City	Brian Jones	
1988	Homeboy	Billy Harrison	
1989	Homeboyz II: Crack City	Breakdancer	
1995	White Man's Burden	Terrence	
2000	Alien Fury: Countdown to Invasion	Kevin Anjanette	TV movie
2001	Happy Birthday	Trent	Short
2001	Two Can Play That Game	Dwain	
2003	Biker Boyz	Biker	
2003	The Partners	Reggie	TV movie
2004	Mr. 3000	Skillet	
2005	The Salon	Ricky	
2005	Briar & Graves	Dr. Jefferson Sims	TV movie
2006	Our Thirties	Daniel	Short
2009	Pastor Brown	Chaz	
2010	Night and Day	Chris Talbot	TV movie
2011	35 and Ticking	Austin	
2012	Middle of Nowhere	Littleton	
2013	Company Town	Don	TV movie
2016	The Christmas Swap	Gerry Craig	TV movie
2018	Relentless	Coffee Drinking Man	
2018	Christmas Everlasting	Peter	TV movie

=== Television ===
Year	Title	Role	Notes
1985-87	The Cosby Show	Robert Foreman	Recurring cast: Seasons 2-3
1986	Diff'rent Strokes	Leon Davis	Episode: "Lifestyles of the Poor and Unknown"
1989-90	Another World	Jesse Lawrence	Regular Cast
1990	ABC Afterschool Specials	Brian Davidson	Episode: "All That Glitters"
1991-94	All My Children	Terrence Frye	Regular Cast
1995-96	The Crew	MacArthur 'Mac' Edwards	Main cast
1996	The Jamie Foxx Show	Icepick Isaacs	Episode: "A Thanksgiving to Remember"
1997	Martin	Trey Foster	Episode: "Goin' for Mine"
1997-99	Between Brothers	James Gordon	Main cast
1998	Living in Captivity	Curtis Cook	Main cast
2000	Secret Agent Man	Davis	Main cast
2000	The X-Files	Agent	Episode: "Within"
2000	Nash Bridges	Jason	Episode: "Double Trouble"
2001	NYPD Blue	Officer Lawrence	Episode: "Love Hurts"
2001-02	Inside Schwartz	William Morris	Recurring cast
2001-02	Girlfriends	Sean Ellis	Recurring cast: season 1-2
2002-03	Hidden Hills	Zack Timmerman	Main cast
2004	Less than Perfect	William	Episode: "The Pimp Hat"
2004	Half & Half	Brendan	Episode: "The Big Birth-Date Episode"
2004	Strong Medicine	Michael	Episode: "Selective Breeding"
2004	Second Time Around	Chris	Episode: "Coupling Up"
2005-06	Ghost Whisperer	Mitch Marino	Recurring cast: season 1, guest: season 2
2006	Jake in Progress	Mark	Recurring cast: season 2
2006	CSI: Miami	Alan Solner	Episode: "Curse of the Coffin"
2009	Samantha Who?	Wes Green	Episode: "Todd's Job"
2008-10	Cold Case	Jarrod Jones	Recurring cast: season 5, guest: season 7
2010-11	The Event	Mike Garret	Recurring cast
2011	Grey's Anatomy	Oliver Richter	Episode: "Golden Hour"
2012	Make It or Break It	Coach McIntire	Main cast: season 3
2012	Eureka	Dr. Marcus Blake	Episode: "Smarter Carter"
2013	Walk This Way	Himself	Episode: "In His Presence"
2013-14	Mistresses	Paul Malloy	Recurring cast: Season 1, guest: Season 2
2014	Hart of Dixie	Lt. Governor Alex Byrd	Episode: "One More Last Chance"
2015–2016	Real Husbands of Hollywood	Himself	Main cast: season 4
2016	Stitchers	Sam Lewis	Episode: "Pretty Little Lawyers"
2016-19	Queen Sugar	Remy Newell	Main cast: season 1-3, guest: season 4
2024	The Upshaws	James	2 episodes

== Awards and nominations ==
Year	Award	Category	Nominated work	Result	Ref.
1992	Daytime Emmy Awards	Outstanding Younger Actor in a Drama Series	All My Children	Nominated	
1993	Daytime Emmy Awards	Outstanding Younger Actor in a Drama Series	All My Children	Nominated	
1994	Daytime Emmy Awards	Outstanding Younger Actor in a Drama Series	All My Children	Nominated	
2017	NAACP Image Awards	Outstanding Supporting Actor in a Drama Series	Queen Sugar	Nominated	
1993	Soap Opera Digest Awards	Outstanding Male Newcomer	All My Children	Nominated	
1994	Soap Opera Digest Awards	Outstanding Younger Leading Actor	All My Children	Nominated	
