= The Clinic (2010 film) =

- Film poster
- Directed by: James Rabbitts
- Written by: James Rabbitts
- Produced by: Samuel Pinczewski
- Starring: Tabrett Bethell; Freya Stafford; Andy Whitfield; Clare Bowen; Marshall Napier; Liz Alexander; Sophie Lowe; Adrienne Pickering; Anni Finsterer
- Cinematography: Brad Shield
- Edited by: Ryan Boucher
- Music by: Jason Fernandez; Kirke Godfrey; Angela Little
- Production company: The Little Film Company
- Release date: 25 July 2010 (Melbourne)
- Running time: 94 minutes
- Country: Australia
- Language: English

The Clinic is a 2010 Australian horror thriller film written and directed by James Rabbitts, shot in Deniliquin, NSW, Australia. and follows six abducted women and their newborn babies.

== Plot ==
Mother-to-be, Beth, is travelling with her fiancé Cameron. After narrowly avoiding a road accident, they stop at a motel in a small town. Cameron returns from a stroll to find his fiancée missing. After being arrested for attacking the motel owner, he attempts to escape but is killed in a car crash.

Beth awakens naked in a warehouse, in a bath tub filled with ice, with a C-section scar and realises her baby has been stolen. She wanders outside, where she finds three other mothers who have also had their unborn children surgically removed. They find another woman, barely alive, with her womb surgically opened, who declares her child to be 'blue'.

The mothers discover that their babies are alive and locked in cages, each with a coloured clip matched to a tag sewn inside their true mother's abdomen. The only way to match the mother to the child is to remove the tag from their abdomens, which will lead to death by blood loss. One of the mothers decides to kill the other women and find her baby through the process of elimination. One by one, they are picked off until Beth catches and fatally injures the woman. She threatens to drop the remaining tag down a hole unless Beth promises to take care of her baby. After the woman dies, Beth discovers that the babies are no longer in their cages and she is knocked out by an unknown assailant.

Beth regains consciousness and finds herself chained to the floor, with a Russian couple inspecting her baby. They reveal the scam: prospective parents receive a baby to adopt based on their mother's performance in the experiment – the winning mother's child being the one set for adoption. The woman running the operation flees with Beth's baby. Beth frees herself and confronts her, only to discover that she herself was picked up as a baby from this facility by her own adoptive parents. Beth takes revenge on the woman and escapes with her child. Months later, she visits the grave site of her biological mother and goes to meet the man she believes to be her biological father.

== Cast ==
- Tabrett Bethell as Beth Church (DCVIII, Violet)
- Freya Stafford as Veronica (DCVII, Yellow)
- Andy Whitfield as Cameron Marshall
- Clare Bowen as Ivy (DCVI, Orange)
- Marshall Napier as Officer Marvin Underwood
- Liz Alexander as Ms. Shepard
- Sophie Lowe as Allison (DCV, Green)
- Boris Brkic as Hank
- Marcel Bracks as Duncan Shepard
- Adrienne Pickering as Jane Doe (DCIV, Red)
- Anni Finsterer as Locker Room Woman (DCIII, Blue)
- Cecily Polson as Woman on perch
- Harold Hopkins as Grave digger

== Release ==
The film was screened in the USA on 4 November 2009 at the American Film Market. Another screening followed on 10 October 2010 at the ScreamFest Horror Film Festival. The movie received mixed reviews.

== Reception ==
The Clinic received generally negative reviews from critics and audiences.

=== Accolades ===
Tabrett Bethell was nominated for Best Actress at the Fangoria Chainsaw Awards in 2012.
