= Mistresses (American TV series) =

American mystery drama soap opera television series

- Genre: Drama; Mystery; Soap opera
- Based on: Mistresses by Lowri Glain and S. J. Clarkson
- Developed by: K. J. Steinberg
- Starring: Alyssa Milano; Yunjin Kim; Rochelle Aytes; Jes Macallan; Jason George; Brett Tucker; Erik Stocklin; Rob Mayes; Jennifer Esposito; Tabrett Bethell
- Composer: Danny Lux
- Country of origin: United States
- Original language: English
- No. of seasons: 4
- No. of episodes: 52 (list of episodes)

Production
- Executive producers: Rina Mimoun; Douglas Rae; Grant Scharbo; Robert M. Sertner; K. J. Steinberg
- Production locations: Los Angeles, California (2013–16); Vancouver, British Columbia, Canada (2015)
- Running time: 43 minutes
- Production companies: Good Talk Productions (2013–2014; seasons 1–2); Bob Sertner Productions; Ecosse Films; ABC Studios; Tsiporah Productions (2015; season 3)

Original release
- Network: ABC
- Release: June 3, 2013 – September 6, 2016

Mistresses is an American mystery drama soap opera television series based on the 2008–10 British series of the same name, about the lives of four female friends and their involvement in an array of illicit and complex relationships. This adaptation was developed by K. J. Steinberg, and stars Alyssa Milano, Rochelle Aytes, Yunjin Kim, Jes Macallan, Jennifer Esposito, and Tabrett Bethell in the lead roles. The series was originally set to premiere on May 27, 2013. However, ABC announced that Mistresses would premiere on June 3, 2013.

On September 9, 2016, ABC canceled Mistresses after four seasons.

It had been expected that if there had been a fifth season it would have been intended to be the final season.

== Cast and characters ==
Actor	Character	Seasons			
Actor	Character	1	2	3	4
Alyssa Milano	Savi Davis	Main	Main		
Yunjin Kim	Dr. Karen Kim	Main	Main	Main	Main
Rochelle Aytes	April Malloy	Main	Main	Main	Main
Jes Macallan	Joss Carver	Main	Main	Main	Main
Brett Tucker	Harry Davis	Main	Main	Main	Main
Erik Stocklin	Sam Grey	Main			
Jason George	Dominic Taylor	Main	Main	Guest	Guest
Jennifer Esposito	Calista Raines			Main	
Rob Mayes	Marc Nickleby			Main	Main
Tabrett Bethell	Kate Davis		Guest		Main

- Alyssa Milano as Savannah "Savi" Davis (seasons 1–2), a lawyer who is Harry's ex-wife and the older half-sister of Joss.
- Yunjin Kim as Dr. Karen Kim, a psychiatrist who was romantically involved with one of her patients.
- Rochelle Aytes as April Malloy, a widowed single mother, who is the owner of home furnishings boutique and cafe.
- Jes Macallan as Josslyn "Joss" Carver, a real estate agent and the younger half-sister of Savi.
- Brett Tucker as Harry Davis, a chef/restaurateur who is Savi's ex-husband.
- Erik Stocklin as Sam Grey (season 1), the son of Karen's deceased lover.
- Jason George as Dominic Taylor (main, seasons 1–2; guest, seasons 3–4), a lawyer and coworker of Savi's.
- Rob Mayes as Marc Nickleby (seasons 3–4), a handsome new friend and colleague of Harry's and the uncle of Paul and Miranda's son who moves in with April.
- Jennifer Esposito as Calista Raines (born Carla Rizzotti) (season 3), creative director of a luxury fashion brand who befriends Joss.
- Tabrett Bethell as Kate Davis (guest, season 2; main, season 4), Harry's sister who relocates to Los Angeles looking for love after the breakdown of her engagement.

== Episodes ==
Season	Episodes	Originally released	
Season	Episodes	First released	Last released
1	13	June 3, 2013	September 9, 2013
2	13	June 2, 2014	September 1, 2014
3	13	June 18, 2015	September 3, 2015
4	13	May 30, 2016	September 6, 2016

== Production ==
=== Development ===
In February 2012, ABC announced that it had green-lighted Mistresses with a direct-to-series order and a planned summer 2013 airdate. Thirteen episodes were ordered. K.J. Steinberg wrote the pilot episode, which had previously been under consideration for a pilot order for ABC's fall 2012 schedule. This is the second attempt by a network to import the British series to the U.S. In 2008, Lifetime announced it was developing the series, but it never made it to air. The Lifetime version was also to have starred Aytes, alongside Milano's Charmed co-star Holly Marie Combs.

On September 25, 2013, ABC renewed Mistresses for a second season, which aired from June 2 to September 1, 2014. On September 30, 2014, ABC renewed the series for a third season with production of the program being moved from Los Angeles to Vancouver, British Columbia. The season premiered on June 18, 2015, with a special two-hour premiere in a new Thursday timeslot. On September 25, 2015, ABC renewed Mistresses for a fourth season of 13 episodes. In December 2015, Mistresses was selected for the California film and TV tax credit, relocating filming of the series back to Los Angeles.

=== Casting ===
Casting announcements began in early March, with Rochelle Aytes and Jes Macallan being the first actors cast. Aytes portrays April, a widow and mother of one, while Macallan plays Josslyn, a real estate broker and the youngest of the women. Yunjin Kim came on board the project in mid-March in the role of Karen, a psychiatrist who is upset over the death of a patient with whom she was involved. Alyssa Milano completed the lead cast when she signed on to portray Savannah, a married lawyer and older sister to Josslyn.

On September 30, 2014, Milano announced that she would not be returning for the third season of the series as production would be later moved from Los Angeles to Vancouver in order to cut production costs. On February 10, 2015, it was confirmed that actress Jennifer Esposito would join the cast as the new co-lead Calista Raines, described as the creative director of a luxury fashion brand. On September 25, 2015, the same day when ABC announced Mistresses's fourth season renewal, Esposito also left the show after one season. On February 19, 2016, it was announced that Tabrett Bethell, who previously guest starred as Kate Davis in season two for one episode, would return in the remaining lead role during the fourth season.

== Reception ==
=== Critical reception ===
Mistresses holds a score of 42 out of 100, on Metacritic, based on 16 negative reviews by critics from early in the first season. Brian Lowry of Variety was quite optimistic about the series, stating: "A frothy prime time soap with a definite naughty streak, the program looks well suited to scratch an itch for daytime serial fans ABC abandoned." He went on to state: "Although the characters and situations largely mirror its inspiration, this U.S. version wisely seeks a somewhat cheekier and less somber tone." Writing for The Wall Street Journal, Dorothy Rabinowitz likened the show to Sex and the City, stating: "Mistresses carries very little hint of any complex lineage, give or take a few scenes that could, with ferocious effort, evoke memories of Carrie Bradshaw and company." Rabinowitz also stated that "the really delectable fun, the best of the sparkle, is to be found in the darkest plots, the looming catastrophes, which promise to come in an endless flow."

In less positive reviews, New York Daily News' David Hinckley gave the premiere two out of five stars, stating that "ABC loves racy romantic dramas, but Mistresses is not its best work in the genre." He continued by saying that "the problem with Mistresses may lie with the expectations it has set." Mary McNamara of the Los Angeles Times stated that executive producer K.J. Steinberg is "grasping the letter yet not the spirit of the thing, appears more interested in replicating plot from the British version rather than character or anything like nuance."

=== Ratings ===
The premiere episode scored a 1.2 in the 18–49 age demographic and 4.40 million viewers. The first season ranked as the No. 2 scripted summer drama among adults 18–49, behind Under the Dome, and averaged around 5 million viewers and a 2.0 18–49 rating, with DVR ratings factored in.

== Accolades ==
Year	Award	Category	Recipient(s)	Result	Ref.
2013	Seoul International Drama Award	Most Popular Foreign Drama	Received by Yunjin Kim	Won	
2015	People's Choice Awards	Favorite Dramatic TV Actress	Alyssa Milano	Nominated	

== Broadcast ==
Mistresses premiered on CTV in Canada on June 3, 2013, the same day it premiered in the US. The series premiered in the United Kingdom on July 25, 2013, on TLC In Australia, Mistresses premiered on September 30, 2013, on the Seven Network.
