= Rob Mayes =

American actor, musician, and model (born 1984)

- Occupations: Actor; songwriter; country artist; model
- Years active: 2007–present

Rob Mayes is an American actor, musician, and model. He is best known for starring as the title character in the 2012 horror comedy film John Dies at the End, as well as portraying Tommy Nutter in the short-lived comedy drama television series Jane by Design. He also played Barry in the 2019 film Maybe I'm Fine.

== Early life ==
Mayes was raised in Pepper Pike, Ohio. He started modeling when he was five years old.

He attended the U.S. Naval Academy in Annapolis, Maryland. After leaving the Naval Academy, he focused on songwriting and released a seven-track pop album called Glimpses of Truth.

== Career ==
=== Acting ===
Two weeks after moving to New York City in 2007, Mayes was hired for a one-episode role in Law & Order: Special Victims Unit. In 2008, he played the lead role in the MTV musical television film The American Mall.

Mayes had guest starring roles on Cold Case, Valentine, Bones, and Medium and played the lead role in the 2010 film Ice Castles.

In 2012, he starred as John in John Dies at the End, which premiered at the 2012 Sundance Film Festival.

In 2013, he had a recurring role as Tommy Nutter in Jane by Design and guest starring roles in NCIS, The Glades, and 90210.

After a recurring role on The Client List, he portrayed Matthew Blackwood in the 2013 drama film Burning Blue, which was based on the 1992 play of the same name.

In 2014, Mayes played Troy Quinn in Legends.

In 2015, Mayes joined the cast of the ABC drama series Mistresses as a series regular for its third and fourth seasons, playing the role of Mark Rothwell. Following this, he starred in the CW thriller series Frequency (2016–2017) as Detective Kyle Mosbey. In 2018, he appeared in the science fiction horror film Deep Blue Sea 2. Since then, Mayes has become a frequent lead actor in television films for Hallmark Channel and Lifetime, starring in productions such as The Road Home for Christmas (2019), The Christmas Edition (2020), Christmas in the Rockies (2020), and Sweet on You (2023).

=== Music ===
In 2019, Mayes released his debut country single “Closer”, which he co-wrote with Kevin Leach and Ryan Rossebo. In June 2019, he premiered the music video for “Closer,” directed by Christine Solomon, shot in Malibu and Griffith Park. Later that year he released his first EP, titled Closer, featuring 7 tracks. During the same year, he released the single “Road With No Lines”. Other songs include “My Heart Is Bleeding” and "Prospector".

== Filmography ==
=== Film ===
Year	Title	Role	Notes
2010	Ice Castles	Nick	
2012	Melvin Smarty	Kilcline	
2012	John Dies at the End	John	
2013	Burning Blue	Matthew Blackwood	
2013	Enough Said	Waiter	
2017	Different Flowers	Blake	
2017	Thor: Ragnarok	Asgardian Man	
2018	Deep Blue Sea 2	Trent Slater	
2018	Dangerous Matrimony	David	
2019	Maybe I'm Fine	Barry	
2020	A Soldier's Revenge	Briggs	
2021	The Stay	Chris	
2022	Desperate Riders	Deputy Harms	
2022	5000 Blankets	Bobby Saunders	
2024	The Neon Highway	Wayne	
2024	Lost & Found in Cleveland	Frank	
2025	A Blind Bargain	Vincent	

=== Television ===
Year	Title	Role	Notes
2007	Law & Order: Special Victims Unit	Mark Schroeffel	Episode: "Responsible"
2008	The American Mall	Joey	Television film
2008	Cold Case	Jim Horn '64	Episode: "Wednesday's Women"
2009	Valentine	Matt Desanto	Episode: "She's Gone"
2009	Acceptance	Justin Smelling	Television film
2009	Bones	Trey Johnson	Episode: "The Beautiful Day in the Neighborhood"
2009	Sorority Wars	Beau	Television film
2010	Medium	Young fireman	Episode: "Smoke Damage"
2011	Hound Dogs	Cash	Television film
2012	NCIS	Kyle Baxter	Episode: "Psych Out"
2012	Jane by Design	Tommy Nutter	5 episodes
2012	The Glades	Lucas Gardner	Episode: "Islandia"
2012	90210	Colin Bell	3 episodes
2012	A Golden Christmas 3	Bobby Alden	Television film
2012	Love for Christmas	Bobby Alden	Television film
2012	Meddling Mom	Ben	Television film
2013	The Client List	Derek Malloy	12 episodes
2014	Beauty & the Beast	Patrick Franco	Episode: "Ancestors"
2014	Legends	Troy Buchanan	2 episodes
2015	Finding Carter	Rick	2 episodes
2015–2016	Mistresses	Marc Nickleby	Main role
2016–2017	Frequency	Kyle Mosbey	5 episodes
2018	My Christmas Inn	Brian Anderson	Television film
2018	S.W.A.T.	Rick Owens	Episode "Payback"
2019	Proven Innocent	CPO Martin Anderson	Episode: "SEAL Team Deep Six"
2019	The Road Home for Christmas	Wes Bailey	Television Film
2019	House on the Hill (aka He's Out to Get You)	Duke	Television film
2020	The Christmas Edition	Finn	Television film
2022	Promised Land	Sheriff	Episode: "El Regalo (The Gift)"
2023	Sweet on You	Drew	Television film
2023	Just Jake	Jake	Television film
2024	Killer Nurses	Dr. Lawrence C. Hartsen	Television film
2024	Tracker	Jess Pardue	Episode: "Noble Rot"
2025	A Christmas Murder Mystery	Troy Sterling	Television film
