= Tabrett Bethell =

Australian actress (born 1981)

- Born: 13 May 1981 (age 45); Sydney, New South Wales, Australia
- Occupations: Actress, model
- Years active: 1997–2007 (model); 2001–2016 (actress)
- Height: 173 cm (5 ft 8 in)
- Website: twitter.com/therealtabrett

Tabrett Bethell (born 13 May 1981) is an Australian former actress, best known for portraying the character Cara Mason in the television series Legend of the Seeker. Prior to her acting career, she worked as a fashion model from the age of 16, and a cheerleader for the National Rugby League Cronulla-Sutherland Sharks until 2006.

== Early life ==
After Bethell's early years as a model and cheerleader, she decided to actively pursue acting and trained at Screenwise, completing the 12 Month Intensive program in December 2007. During this training she continued to model; most notably a Neill Grigg race day fascinator resembling the Harbour Bridge for a February 2007 cover of The Daily Telegraph.

== Career ==
Early acting work included starring as Amy in Campbell Graham's film Anyone You Want, and the role of Chris in Strangers Lovers Killers, released 2010.

From 2009 to 2010, Bethell filmed Legend of the Seeker, a television show based on Terry Goodkind's Sword of Truth series. She portrays a Mord'Sith named Cara Mason who appeared at the end of the first season before becoming a regular in Season 2. Bethell garnered a large fan following because of her portrayal of Cara Mason in Legend of the Seeker.

After Legend of the Seeker, Bethell played Beth in James Rabbitts's Australian thriller The Clinic, which was shot in Deniliquin, New South Wales, Australia in November 2008. In August 2010 Bethell won Best Actress at the Manhattan Film Festival for her role in Anyone You Want.

In March 2011, Bethell was cast in a Warner Bros TV pilot, "Poe", as the character of Sarah Elmira Royster, Edgar Allan Poe's muse and former lover. In May 2011, it was announced that ABC would not pick up the series.

Tabrett Bethell made her Bollywood debut with the Hindi action thriller film Dhoom 3 which was released 20 December 2013. She joined Aamir Khan and Katrina Kaif in the third installment of the popular Dhoom series. The film became the highest-grossing Bollywood film of all time in international markets. She guest starred in Mistresses Season 2, Episode 6 ("What Do You Really Want"), as Kate. The episode aired 7 July 2014. In March 2014 she was cast in the independent short film Oren as lead. The film won two prizes at the 2015 Hollywood Reel Independent Festival Best Actress Tabrett Bethell and Best International Short Film.

Her last screen credit was as a series regular in the 2016 season of Mistresses.

== Personal life ==
Bethell is named after a street in Sydney, Tabrett Street, something that resulted when her parents disagreed on what to name her while still at the hospital (her mother wanted "Siobhan", and her father wanted "Murray"). Her father went for a drive, saw the name of the street, and returned to the hospital to suggest it to her mother, who said, "Yes, that's it!".

== Filmography ==
=== Film ===
| Year | Title | Role | Notes |
|---|---|---|---|
| 2007 | Mr. Right | Lead | Video short |
| 2007 | The Swallow | Veronika Le'Morel, the beggar | Short film |
| 2007 | Strangers Lovers Killers | Chris | Film |
| 2010 | The Clinic | Beth Church | Feature film |
| 2010 | Anyone You Want | Amy | Film |
| 2012 | Sanctuary | Lia | Short film |
| 2013 | Dhoom 3 | Victoria Williams | Film (India) |
| 2014 | Oren | Emile | Short film |

=== Television ===
| Year | Title | Role | Notes |
|---|---|---|---|
| 2001 | Life Support | | Episode #1.2 |
| 2009–2010 | Legend of the Seeker | Cara Mason | 23 episodes |
| 2010 | Cops L.A.C. | Eve Louizos | Episode: "Life is a Rodio" |
| 2011 | Poe | Sarah Elmira Royster | TV pilot |
| 2014–2016 | Mistresses | Kate Davis | Episode 02x06: "What Do You Really Want"; Series regular (Season 4, episode 2–13) |

== Theatre ==
| Year | Title | Role | Notes |
|---|---|---|---|
| 2008 | Somewhere between the Sky and the Sea by Alex Broun | Stephanie | Short and Sweet Sydney |
| 2012 | Savage in Limbo | | |
