= Mistresses (British TV series) =

British television drama series (2008–2010)

- Genre: Drama
- Created by: S. J. Clarkson; Lowri Glain; Rachel Anthony
- Starring: Sarah Parish; Sharon Small; Shelley Conn; Orla Brady; Raza Jaffrey; Adam Rayner; Patrick Baladi; Max Brown; Adam Astill
- Country of origin: United Kingdom
- Original language: English
- No. of series: 3
- No. of episodes: 16

Production
- Executive producers: Matt Arlidge; Douglas Rae; Lucy Bedford; Bethan Jones
- Producers: Lowri Glain; Rhonda Smith
- Production location: Bristol
- Running time: 60 minutes

Original release
- Network: BBC One; BBC HD
- Release: 8 January 2008 – 26 August 2010

Mistresses is a British drama television series that follows the lives of four female friends and their involvement in an array of illicit and complex relationships. The series was created by S. J. Clarkson, Lowri Glain and Rachel Anthony, and filmed in Bristol by Ecosse Films for BBC Drama, Wales.

The first series was broadcast on BBC One from 8 January to 12 February 2008 in a six-episode run. A second series of six episodes aired from 17 February to 24 March 2009. Mistresses returned for a third and final series comprising four episodes on 5 August 2010.

== Main characters ==
The four central women

Katie Roden (Sarah Parish) is a GP who, at the beginning of series 1, is having an affair with John Grey, a terminally ill patient whom she later helps commit physician assisted suicide. After John's death, his son, Sam (Max Brown), discovers evidence of this. Distraught, he confides in Katie, unaware of her role in his father's life and they begin a reluctant relationship as she struggles with her grief and guilt over helping John die. Ultimately, unable to lie any longer, Katie tells Sam, who informs his mother and the authorities resulting in Katie being suspended from work for a year.

Series 2 begins with Katie taking a junior post in a hospital department working alongside an old lover from medical school, Jack Hudson (Steven Brand), now married to Megan (Natasha Little) but still holds a torch for Katie. Katie also meets Jack and Megan's friend, fellow surgeon Dan Tate (Mark Umbers), with whom she strikes up a relationship. All goes well until Jack decides to act on his feelings for Katie and they embark on a brief affair. Katie ends the affair before she is discovered but Dan witnesses a final kiss between the pair and decides to move to Australia to take up a medical post he's been offered. Katie leaves a heartfelt note of apology for Dan, which he reads before asking her to go with him to Australia.

Series 3 introduces Katie's mother Vivienne Roden (Joanna Lumley), with whom Katie has a tense relationship. Vivienne has found a new man and intends on selling the old family home where Katie lived as a child, much to Katie's distaste. Later, Katie discovers that her (now-deceased) father had a mistress during his marriage to Vivienne, and Katie softens toward her mother. Additionally, Katie becomes close with Trudi's partner, Richard, (Patrick Baladi) and the two lean on each other during hard times as well as sharing a kiss. Katie rejects a relationship with Richard, but agrees to counsel him on his marriage; but Richard is killed in a car accident on his way to meet Katie at the railway station. Trudi later discovers the plan and, feeling betrayed (thinking the two were having an affair and that Richard intended to leave her for Katie), ends her friendship with Katie.

Trudi Malloy (Sharon Small) is a 9/11 widow and mother of two, who is convinced her husband, Paul, is still alive. In the first episode, she receives a cheque from a 9/11 bereavement fund worth around £1 million and begins seeing Richard (Patrick Baladi), a single father whose daughter goes to the same school as Trudi's daughters. A woman, Sally, makes contact with Trudi, claiming she was Paul's lover while he was in New York City and that they have a son together. Trudi decides to split the money with Sally in order to provide for the son Paul fathered with her, but is stunned to discover that she was right all along - Paul is alive, and used 9/11 as an excuse to carry out his plan of leaving Trudi for Sally. Trudi informs the authorities and returns the bereavement money.

In series 2, Richard and his daughter, Amy, have moved in with Trudi and her daughters and put his house on the market. Trudi wants them to divorce their partners and get married but Richard is unsure. Trudi also starts selling her home-made cakes at a local deli where Lucas (Sean Francis), the owner, is clearly keen on her. Concerns over Richard's finances lead Trudi to discover his secret - that his wife, who he had claimed had abandoned him and Amy, is in a residential home for patients suffering early-onset Alzheimer's. Horrified, Trudi insists that Richard tells Amy the truth about her mother. Despite her brief fling with Lucas, she and Richard reconcile eventually, settling down to life together as a family.

In series 3, Richard is feeling sidelined as Trudi spends all of her time at her cake business, which now has its own factory and workforce. Whilst he embarks on a friendship and brief affair with Katie, Trudi is flattered by the attentions of an investor in the cake business, Chris (Vincent Regan), and frustrated by what she feels is a lack of support from Richard. She enjoys a one-night stand with Chris but soon comes to regret it and is distraught when Richard is killed in a car accident whilst on his way to meet Katie at the train station, where he intends to talk about Trudi's infidelity.

Jessica Fraser (Shelley Conn) is an event planner who has had a string of lovers including her boss, Simon (Adam Astill), and who doesn't get involved in committed, long-term relationships. In the first episode, she is organizing a wedding for a lesbian couple and strikes up a friendship with one of the brides, Alex (Anna Torv). There's clear chemistry between the pair and Jessica realises that she has feelings for Alex, which later become complicated when she begins to fall in love with her. After seeing the trouble caused by her friend Siobhan's infidelity, Jessica breaks off the relationship, despite Alex's offer to leave her partner for Jessica.

As series 2 begins, Jessica is in an open marriage with a man named Mark with whom she had a whirlwind affair. Jessica believes the marriage is a strong one but is shocked by how jealous she is when she realizes that Mark has been engaged in a long term sexual relationship with his assistant, Carrie, (Preeya Kalidas). Jessica makes her feelings known, and though Mark realises she is unhappy he can't bring himself to be faithful to one woman, causing them to split. Jess discovers that she is pregnant and, to her surprise, can't bring herself to have a termination. Mark tells her they should make a go of things as a family and cease seeing other people.

At the start of series 3 two years later, Jessica has miscarried and Mark has gone bankrupt. He is forced to accept a lowly job in a call centre to provide for his family, but the shame of how far he has fallen causes him to quit and Jessica realises they can't afford IVF treatment so Mark accepts a loan from Siobhan, claiming it is for the IVF but actually using it to invest in business, in a bid to regain his lost wealth. When Jessica finds out, she's furious, causing her friendship with Siobhan and relationship with Mark to unravel.

Siobhan Dillon (Orla Brady) is a successful lawyer. She and her husband, Hari (Raza Jaffrey), have been trying to start a family for some time and Siobhan is weary of his obsession with their fertility issues. She flirts with and eventually has a brief affair with a colleague, Dominic (Adam Rayner). Upon seeing a specialist, Hari discovers that he is infertile, but the doctor suggests IVF treatment. Before this can take place, Siobhan is shocked to discover she is pregnant and realises the baby must be Dominic's. Initially, she lets Hari think that he is the father but eventually admits the affair. Hari is heartbroken but nonetheless (after a brief split) agrees to take Siobhan back and raise the child as their own.

As series 2 begins, Siobhan has had the baby – a little girl, Elsa – and returned to work. Hari has become a stay-at-home dad but has not been able to forgive Siobhan for her infidelity and they are sleeping in separate beds. To satisfy her sexual needs, Siobhan secretly goes out during the night and picks up men in hotel bars for anonymous sex. When Jessica discovers what Siobhan is doing, Siobhan tries to argue that this is different, and more acceptable, than her relationship with Dominic because she is not emotionally involved. Things become complicated when she meets Tom McCormack (Thomas Lockyer), an older businessman who is unsatisfied with their one night stand and begins to pursue Siobhan, showing up at her home and becoming a client at work in a bid to insert himself into her life. Eventually Tom resorts to sending photos of him and Siobhan together to Hari, destroying her marriage. Hari bids an emotional goodbye to Siobhan and baby Elsa, then leaves for good.

Siobhan's romances take a back seat in series 3 as she continues bringing up Elsa as a single mother. When Dominic, with whom Siobhan has remained friends, tells her that he is engaged to a woman he met whilst working in America, Siobhan is initially pleased but clearly still harbours feelings for the father of her child. The two grow closer again but Siobhan is determined not to act on her feelings and ruin the wedding plans. Eventually Dominic tells Siobhan it's her that he wants and that he's called off the wedding, and the pair reconcile.

== Episodes ==
=== Series overview ===
Series	Episodes	Originally released	
Series	Episodes	First released	Last released
1	6	8 January 2008	12 February 2008
2	6	17 February 2009	24 March 2009
3	4	5 August 2010	26 August 2010

=== Series 1 (2008) ===
No. overall	No. in series	Title	Directed by	Written by	Original release date	UK viewers (millions)
1	1	"Episode One"	S.J. Clarkson	Rachel Anthony	8 January 2008	5.05
The first episode welcomes us to the lives of four women. Katie suffers when her lover, a married man, dies and his son, Sam, confides that his father was having an affair and he wants to know who with. Trudi gets a cheque for $2 million following her husband's death in 9/11, but is finding it hard to move on. Lawyer Siobhan is being pushed away by her husband Hari after pressuring her for a baby, and is drawn to her colleague, Dominic. Jessica is given a lesbian wedding to arrange, and clashes with bride Alex.
2	2	"Episode Two"	S.J. Clarkson	Richard Warlow	15 January 2008	4.92
Siobhan finds out Hari is infertile and feels guilty about her liaison with Dominic, and confesses to Jessica, who tells her she shouldn't confess to Hari. Jessica struggles with her feelings for lesbian bride Alex after they share an intimate moment. Katie takes Sam to see an exhibition of architectural designs, hoping it will convince him to return to college. When he asks her to sign a book, she feels threatened but does it, disguising her handwriting so he won't guess her secret. However, desperate to make up for offending her, Sam invites Katie to dinner, where they share a kiss. Trudi has an uncomfortable date with Richard.
3	3	"Episode Three"	Philip John	Harriet Braun	22 January 2008	4.76
Jessica struggles to let Alex go after their night together, and gets drunk at the wedding, despite Alex suggesting she not marry Lisa. Sam continues pursuing Katie, who decides to take him off her patient list to avert suspicion. Unable to deny their attraction, however, she calls Sam over to her place. Trudi traces the mysterious phone calls to a hotel room, and it turns out to be prank calls from a little boy. Later that night, however, the boy's mother, Sally, arrives and drops a shocking bombshell. Siobhan tries to end her affair with Dominic when she and Hari start to reconcile, before realizing she's pregnant.
4	4	"Episode Four"	Philip John	Richard Warlow	29 January 2008	4.63
Jessica starts to realize she's in love with Alex. Trudi refuses to believe that Sally was Paul's mistress, which affects her relationship with Richard. Katie is beginning to fall for Sam, but feels forced to tell him her secret, leaving her life in pieces. Siobhan's pregnancy is revealed to Hari.
5	5	"Episode Five"	Peter Hoar	Richard Warlow & Catrin Clarke	5 February 2008	4.73
Katie is worried about her confession to Sam, and tells him the full truth about his father's death when he visits her house in the night. Trudi and Richard's relationship is seemingly non-existent, so she focuses on making friends with Sally and little Paul, who she contemplates sharing the $2 million with. But when she goes to give Sally the cheque, she makes a devastating discovery that changes her life forever. Jessica tries to make up with Alex at a business lunch, but it does not go to plan. Siobhan attempts to get Dominic promoted so she won't have to see him after confessing to Hari that the baby isn't his.
6	6	"Episode Six"	Peter Hoar	Rachel Anthony	12 February 2008	5.12
Siobhan tries to sort out her relationship with Hari, and even considers a termination as he refuses to forgive her while she's pregnant. She realizes that she can't go through with it and when she tells Hari, he accepts that and asks her to come home. Jessica has to deal with Alex's choices on her Birthday. Trudi meets Paul and decisions are made about the children. Meanwhile, Katie is on trial about her love affair with John, and Sam's mother claims that she killed him with an overdose of morphine without her consent.

=== Series 2 (2009) ===
No. overall	No. in series	Title	Directed by	Written by	Original release date	UK viewers (millions)
7	1	"Episode One"	Peter Hoar	Richard Warlow	17 February 2009	5.28
Over a year has passed since the troubled love lives of Katie, Trudi, Siobhan and Jessica left them heartbroken, but they have successfully licked their wounds and moved on. Katie's suspension from practicing medicine has come to an end, and she is ready for her first day in a new job. She has sworn off men, but can the temptation of an attentive Dan change her mind, or is there trouble in store when her new boss turns out to be an old flame from medical school? Trudi and Richard's relationship is still going strong, but money is tight and life is chaotic. Trudi takes matters into her own hands, and decides to earn some extra cash baking cakes. But Trudi starts to feel that there is something lacking in her relationship, and when Richard suggests they should live together to make their hectic lives easier, her romantic sensibilities are offended. To those on the outside, Siobhan seems to be living the perfect life with house-husband Hari and baby Elsa. Even Elsa's biological dad, Dominic, seems to be settling into a family routine. However, Siobhan and Hari's relationship is far from perfect, and Siobhan is hiding a very dark secret. Jessica has been swept off her feet by playboy Mark. Together they are sexy, naughty and lots of fun. Could the ultimate commitment-phobe be about to say 'I do'?
8	2	"Episode Two"	Peter Hoar	Richard Warlow	24 February 2009	4.16
Siobhan is floored when her new client at work turns out to be Tom, the man she had a secret liaison with. Siobhan is quick to ensure that Tom knows their night together was a one-off, but he is determined to continue their affair in spite of Siobhan's protestations. Siobhan is desperate for her marriage to work, but faced with continual rejection from Hari, can she resist the lure of persistent Tom? Amongst the chaos of Richard moving in, Trudi is alarmed to find his bank statement showing a mysterious pay-out. Trudi confronts Richard, but he is defensive and will not tell her what the money was for. The mystery seems to be explained when Richard gives her a diamond ring, but it is not long before Trudi's suspicions are further aroused. After a romantic weekend in bed with Dan, Katie has a sudden change of heart. However, when she later sees him with a pretty colleague, she cannot help but feel jealous. Jack is quick to assure her that Dan is crazy about her, but when Jack and Katie enjoy a drink after work, Jack shows a little interest of his own. Jessica and Simon fear their business is sinking until Simon mysteriously announces he has saved the company. Wanting to share the good news with Mark, Jessica is disappointed to find he is busy with his PA, Carrie, and her mischievous jealousy drives her into the arms of another.
9	3	"Episode Three"	Francesca Joseph	Harriet Warner	3 March 2009	4.84
Trudi is still concerned about Richard's financial secrets after her discovery that he is paying out 3,000 pounds a month. When she confronts him, Richard confesses that it is going to a client to whom he is in debt. But further discoveries raise Trudi's suspicions again, and she becomes determined to find out the truth. Katie is confused following her kiss with Jack. She decides to throw herself into her relationship with Dan, and when Jack tells her he wants to kiss her again, she quickly knocks him back. But, unsure if she can control her feelings, Katie questions whether she can continue to work at the hospital with the constant temptation. When Jessica's business partner Simon reveals it was her husband, Mark, who saved Autograph Events, it takes a lot of persuasion from the girls to make her see it was a romantic gesture. When Jessica pays Mark a visit at work, she sees something that gives her an unfamiliar feeling of jealousy. Could it be this modern girl is not as modern as she thought? Siobhan is hurt by Hari's lack of forgiveness over her previous affair with Dominic, and this drives her straight back into Tom's bed. When Siobhan tells Hari she thinks they could have a sexless marriage, Hari cannot believe what he is hearing. It forces him to take a step in the right direction in getting their marriage back on track, but is it already too late?
10	4	"Episode Four"	Francesca Joseph	Muirinn Lane Kelly	10 March 2009	Under 4.41
Jessica is suffering from the worst hangover of her life following the massive drunken bust-up with Mark, and she is mortified when reminded of her actions. The newlyweds soon make-up, and Mark whisks Jessica away for a romantic weekend, but it is not long before an unwelcome visitor bursts their romantic bubble. Trudi's discovery that Richard's estranged wife Natalie is living in a care home has left her horrified. When Trudi lets Richard finally explain, she is terrified that she will hate him. Trudi tentatively forgives him, and they visit Natalie together. But once reality hits, can Trudi ever really trust Richard again? Jack surprises Katie with a trip down memory lane; they spend the perfect day together, until Jack has to go home to his wife and kids. Katie heads round to boyfriend Dan's house for lunch, but is shocked to find Jack and his wife are there to join them. Filled with guilt, Katie cannot play at being the happy couple any more, and their pleasant lunch turns sour. Siobhan is at her wits' end trying to get her marriage with Hari back on track. She encourages him to open his own restaurant so she can leave her job and be a stay-at-home mum. It seems she has found the perfect solution, but there is someone who does not want to make it that easy for her.
11	5	"Episode Five"	Peter Lydon	Harriet Warner	17 March 2009	4.37
Flirty newlyweds Jessica and Mark are trying their best to do exclusivity, but Mark is finding it tough. Jessica and Simon have been booked to arrange a twisted tea party for self-help guru Henrietta, who soon sheds some light on Jessica's need for Mark to change. But does Henrietta really have Jessica's best interests at heart when she dishes out her advice? Trudi's relationship with Richard is over; she cannot live with him, knowing that he put his wife into a care home without a second thought. Determined to get over Richard, she throws herself into her cake-baking business with the support of Lucas, which becomes a welcome distraction in more ways than one. Siobhan is in pieces following Hari's discovery of her affair with her client, Tom. Fully expecting Hari not to turn up at their planned therapy session, she is relieved when he walks in. But the relief does not last, as Hari is not there to resolve things in the way Siobhan had hoped. Katie's boyfriend, Dan, is offered a promotion in Australia. Rather than leave the lovely Katie behind, he wants her to go with him. Can Katie swap England for a life down under with Dan? And can her sordid affair with Jack really go away that easily?
12	6	"Episode Six"	Peter Lydon	Richard Warlow	24 March 2009	4.63
Katie is once again resigned to the single life now that Dan knows about her affair with Jack. Jack begs Dan not to tell his wife, Megan, about the affair. But when Megan witnesses Dan and Jack fighting, she looks to Katie for answers. Trudi has a new love interest: Lucas. He is charming and romantic, and everything she is looking for, but she cannot get Richard out of her system. Trudi, Richard and Lucas are thrown together at her daughter's sports day. When Richard and Lucas enter the three-legged race, Richard is left humiliated. As Trudi tends to Richard's injuries, it becomes clear that they should be together, but can she truly forgive him? Siobhan is unable to escape Tom's controlling grip. Despite Dominic's warnings, she is determined to get revenge. As Siobhan watches Tom destroy his wife in their divorce settlement, she is overwhelmed with guilt, but is she really prepared to give up everything to ruin him? Following her split with husband Mark, Jessica is single and pregnant. She does not intend for that to last long, and is not at all interested in motherhood. It is not long before Mark finds out Jessica's secret; he begs her to take him back, but Jessica is convinced they are not made for marriage or parenthood. Mark is not prepared to give up without a fight, but will his last minute dash end up being too little, too late?

=== Series 3 (2010) ===
No. overall	No. in series	Title	Directed by	Written by	Original release date	UK viewers (millions)
13	1	"Episode One"	Tim Fywell	Richard Warlow	5 August 2010	4.64
Two years have passed and the once-unbreakable bond between best friends Katie, Trudi, Jessica and Siobhan has been shattered. As the girls' godfather, it's clear their relationship has changed dramatically: there's tension in the room and no happy greetings. What could have happened to bring them to this? Six months earlier, Katie had returned from Australia after her relationship with Dan had failed. Her life isn't back on track; she's lonely but pretending she's fine. When her widowed mum, Vivienne, turns up on her doorstep after travelling abroad, she's less than thrilled. The pair have a frosty relationship and Vivienne's interfering doesn't make things easy. Vivienne sees Katie embarking on another potentially explosive and destructive relationship, but Katie refuses to listen to her mother. Trudi's cake-making business has grown and it's taken over her life. Richard is now a stay-at-home dad, and with three teenage girls to keep in line it's a tough job. Their relationship is struggling under Trudi's increasing workload so an offer from investor Chris Webb to buy the business is more than welcomed by Richard. However, Trudi won't consider giving it up, causing Richard to confide in someone who could destroy everything. Jessica is desperate to have a baby. A miscarriage 18 months ago and no luck since has made her realise what she really wants from life: a family. With Mark still recovering from bankruptcy, IVF looks unlikely until he seeks a loan from a secret source. Siobhan is a happily single mum enjoying the quiet life with her daughter Elsa, but when Elsa's father Dominic visits from America it's not just his daughter who's thrilled to see him. There is a huge shock in store for her that will change her plans entirely.
14	2	"Episode Two"	Tim Fywell	Muirinn Lane Kelly	12 August 2010	4.42
Katie is forced to take a trip down memory lane as she visits the house she grew up in when her interfering mother, Vivienne, unexpectedly announces that she's planning to sell the property. But Katie finds more than she bargained for and unearths a disturbing secret that threatens to destroy her fond childhood memories. Trudi is still struggling to juggle her successful cake-making business and life at home. Even though her fears that she's failing in her duties as a mother and wife grow, she still declines an attractive offer to sell her business to an investor, Chris Webb, leaving Richard furious. However, another offer from Chris is more than Trudi ever bargained for. Desperate to have a baby, Jessica can't wait to start her IVF treatment despite the high price tag that comes with it. But financial worries begin to take their strain on Jessica and Mark's relationship and she's forced to face the tough realisation that they might not be able to support a child. Siobhan begrudgingly agrees to be Dominic's 'best woman' at his fast-approaching wedding. However, after collecting the rings with Dominic, she realises that she's not as happy about the wedding as she first thought and risks making her feelings clear when she drinks too much at his stag do.
15	3	"Episode Three"	Tim Fywell	Kate Gartside	19 August 2010	4.84
Trudi is guilt-stricken, having spent the evening with Chris, and confides in Katie to seek guidance on whether she should reveal all to Richard. Katie advises her to focus on the future and forget about it, but will Trudi be able to live with her conscience? The realisation that Dominic has moved on with his life leads Siobhan to go on a date with Jeff, the photographer from Elsa's birthday party. Dominic is overcome with jealousy and makes a pass at Siobhan, but he later realises that it would be better all round if they have some distance, leaving Siobhan disheartened when she stumbles across some plane tickets the following morning. Jessica and Mark's financial troubles continue to drive a wedge between the pair, and things worsen when Siobhan comes clean about her secret loan to Mark, which was intended for Jessica's IVF treatment. It's the last straw for Jessica when Mark contemplates another risky investment, but is their marriage over for good? Katie realises that she and Richard are becoming dangerously close and makes it perfectly clear that she wants nothing more to do with him. Concerned for her daughter's welfare, Vivienne supports Katie's decision and also warns Richard to stay away. A distraught Katie decides that she needs to escape for a while and leaves for the train station, but an unexpected phone call with shocking news stops her boarding the train...
16	4	"Episode Four"	Tim Fywell	Moses Raine & Nina Raine	26 August 2010	4.78
The tension mounts as Mistresses concludes. Trudi, Jessica, Katie and Siobhan are united in grief following the death of a loved one. However, emotions run high at the funeral and, with so many questions left unanswered, grief turns to anger and a bitter row ensues, causing a huge rift between the friends. Several months pass without a word between the women, and it appears that they've all gone their separate ways. But a heartbreaking announcement finally brings them back together. They agree to be united for the sake of their friend in need and start by making an appearance at Siobhan's birthday party. There's obvious tension in the air, but can they rebuild their friendship? Meanwhile, an unexpected guest at the party leaves Siobhan confused about her feelings for new boyfriend Jeff. Trudi is panic stricken when Amy goes missing but, amid the chaos, she's reminded that her friends are there in times of need. Despite the bad feelings that have developed between them, will Trudi, Jessica, Katie and Siobhan get the happy ending they deserve?

== Filming locations ==
Locations used for filming other than Bristol: The wedding sequences in episode 1 of series 2 were shot in the gardens and cloister of Iford Manor, near Bradford-on-Avon, Wiltshire. Siobhan's flings in series 2 are filmed in a suite at the Bath Spa Hotel.

== Viewing figures ==
Series	Episode number	Original airing	Total viewers	Series viewer average
1	1	8 January 2008	5.05m	4.87m
1	2	15 January 2008	4.92m	4.87m
1	3	22 January 2008	4.76m	4.87m
1	4	29 January 2008	4.63m	4.87m
1	5	5 February 2008	4.73m	4.87m
1	6	12 February 2008	5.12m	4.87m
2	1	17 February 2009	5.28m	4.76m
2	2	24 February 2009	4.16m	4.76m
2	3	3 March 2009	4.84m	4.76m
2	4	10 March 2009	?	4.76m
2	5	17 March 2009	4.37m	4.76m
2	6	24 March 2009	4.63m	4.76m
3	1	5 August 2010	4.64m	4.67m
3	2	12 August 2010	4.42m	4.67m
3	3	19 August 2010	4.84m	4.67m
3	4	26 August 2010	4.78m	4.67m

Mistresses : UK viewers per episode (millions)

Season	Episode number					
Season	1	2	3	4	5	6
1	5.05	4.92	4.76	4.63	4.73	5.12
2	5.28	4.16	4.84	4.40	4.37	4.63
3	4.64	4.42	4.84	4.78	–	

Audience measurement performed by Broadcasters' Audience Research Board

== Home releases ==
The first series was released on DVD in the United Kingdom and Ireland on 4 February 2008. The second series was released on 30 March 2009.

== International broadcasts ==
In Australia it was broadcast on the Seven Network from 29 April 2008, New Zealand on TV One from 5 November 2008, USA on BBC America from 20 February 2009, and Ireland on RTÉ One from 23 June 2009.

== Remakes ==
=== American remakes ===
Lifetime produced a pilot in 2009 which was never picked up to series. Coincidentally, Alyssa Milano's Charmed co-star Holly Marie Combs was to star and produce it. Rochelle Aytes was also featured in this version, as well as in the ABC series, which ran for 4 seasons.

American Broadcasting Company (a 50% owner of Lifetime) commissioned another Mistresses version, which began in 2012, starring Yunjin Kim in the role of Karen (based on Katie from the British series), Rochelle Aytes as April (based on Trudi from the British series), Jes Macallan as Josslyn (based on Jessica from the British series), and Alyssa Milano as Savannah (based on Siobhan from the British series).

=== South Korean remake ===
Studio Dragon and Chorokbaem Media announced a South Korean remake of the series, Mistress, set to air in April 2018.

=== Japanese remake ===
NHK has bought the remake rights to Mistresses from BBC. It is the first sale by BBC to the Japanese broadcaster.

The 10-episode series is set to air from April 2019 in Drama 10 of NHK General TV.

=== Turkish remake ===
Fox has bought the remake rights to Mistresses from BBC Studios. It is the first sale by BBC to the Turkish broadcaster.

=== Slovak adaptation ===
TV Markíza bought remake rights for Slovak remakes of series.
