= Rina Mimoun =

American television writer and producer

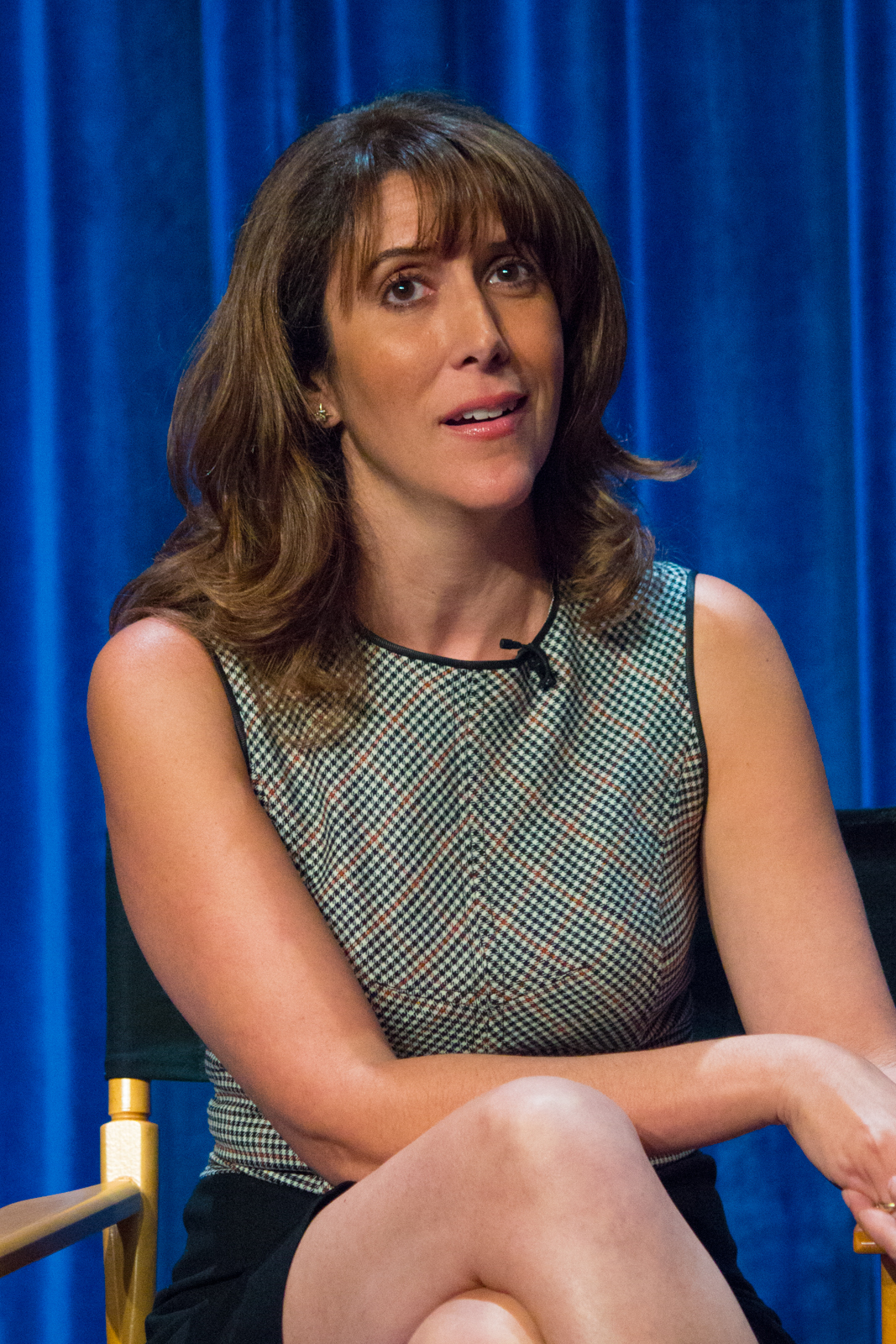
- Mimoun at the PaleyFest Fall TV Previews 2014 for the TV show Red Band Society
- Born: U.S.
- Occupations: Television writer; television producer
- Years active: 1995–present
- Spouse: Scott Weinger (m. 2008)
- Children: 1

Rina Mimoun is an American television writer and producer.

== Career ==
Mimoun's career began at the age of 21 with a Writers Guild of America internship on the Fox comedy Ned and Stacey and a first staff writer job on the UPN sitcom Guys Like Us. She scored her big break when then-Dawson's Creek showrunner Greg Berlanti hired her as a writer on the teen drama series. Mimoun has also written for Jack & Jill, Dawson's Creek, Everwood, Gilmore Girls, Pushing Daisies, Eastwick, and Hart of Dixie.

She served as a supervising producer on Everwood for the first 12 episodes of season 1. She was made a co-executive producer for the rest of season 1 and the entirety of season 2. She became an executive producer and the showrunner for seasons 3 and 4 after creator Greg Berlanti left the series.

Mimoun developed and executive-produced Privileged for The CW Television Network, based on the Zoey Dean novel How To Teach Filthy Rich Girls.

Mimoun serves as an executive producer on Mistresses, an American remake of the 2008–2010 British series of the same name.

== Personal life ==
Mimoun has been married to actor Scott Weinger, the voice of Aladdin, since 2008; together they have a son, who was born in 2009.

Mimoun is Jewish.

== Works ==
Jack & Jill
Title	Year	Credit	Notes
"Not Just a River in Egypt"	1999	Writer, with Randi Mayem Singer	
"To Be Perfectly Honest"	2000	Writer	
"The #@$%!*& Future"	2000	Writer	
"Under Pressure"	2000	Writer, with Randi Mayem Singer	
"A Key Exchange"	2000	Writer	
"Seriously, All Coma Proposals Aside..."	2001	Writer	
"Pressure Points"	2001	Writer	
"Crazy Like a Fox, Hungry Like the Wolf..."	2001	Writer, with Randi Mayem Singer	
"... And Jack & Jill Came Down the Hill, Part 2"	2001	Writer	Series finale

Dawson's Creek
Title	Year	Credit	Notes
"Separation Anxiety"	2001	Writer	
"Use Your Disillusion"	2001	Writer	
"Something Wilder"	2002	Writer	
"100 Light Years from Home"	2002	Writer	

Everwood
Title	Year	Credit	Notes
"The Kissing Bridge"	2002	Writer	
"Turf Wars"	2002	Writer	
"The Price of Fame"	2003	Writer	
"The Unveiling"	2003	Writer, with Greg Berlanti	
"Home"	2003	Teleplay, with Michael Green	Season 1 finale
"The Last of Summer"	2003	Writer, with Greg Berlanti	Season 2 premiere
"Daddy's Little Girl"	2003	Writer, with Joan Binder Weiss	
"Just Like in the Movies"	2003	Writer	
"Unspoken Truths"	2004	Writer, with Greg Berlanti	
"The Day Is Done"	2004	Writer, with Greg Berlanti & Michael Green	Season 2 finale
"For Every Action..."	2004	Writer	Season 3 premiere
"The Reflex"	2004	Writer, with Anna Fricke	
"Oh, the Places You'll Go"	2005	Teleplay, with David Hudgins	
"Where the Heart Is"	2005	Writer, with Michael Green	Season 3 finale
"A Kiss to Build a Dream On"	2005	Writer	Season 4 premiere
"Goodbye, Love"	2006	Writer, with Greg Berlanti	
"Foreverwood, Part 2"	2006	Writer, with David Hudgins	Series finale

Gilmore Girls
Title	Year	Credit	Notes
"Lorelai's First Cotillion"	2006	Writer	

Pushing Daisies
Title	Year	Credit	Notes
"Pigeon"	2007	Writer	

Privileged
Title	Year	Credit	Notes
"Pilot"	2008	Teleplay	Series premiere
"All About Honesty"	2008	Writer	
"All About the Power Position"	2008	Writer, with Christopher Fife	
"All About the Ripple Effect"	2008	Writer, with David Babcock	
"All About Tough Love"	2009	Writer, with Christopher Fife	
"All About a Brand New You!"	2009	Writer	Series finale

Eastwick
Title	Year	Credit	Notes
"Fleas and Casserole"	2009	Writer	
"Bonfire and Betrayal"	2009	Writer, with Maggie Friedman	
"Magic Snow and Creep Gene"	2009	Writer	

Hart of Dixie
Title	Year	Credit	Notes
"In Havoc & In Heat"	2011	Writer	
"Homecoming & Coming Home"	2011	Writer	
"Heart to Hart"	2012	Writer	

Mistresses
Title	Year	Credit	Notes
"The Morning After"	2013	Writer	
"When One Door Closes..."	2013	Writer	
"Rebuild"	2014	Writer	Season 2 premiere
"Surprise"	2014	Writer	
"Gone Girl"	2015	Writer	Season 3 premiere
"Murder She Wrote"	2015	Writer	
