= Brett Tucker =

Australian actor

- Born: Brett Alan Tucker; 21 May 1972 (age 54); Melbourne, Victoria, Australia
- Occupations: Actor, singer
- Years active: 1992–present

Brett Alan Tucker (born 21 May 1972) is an Australian actor and singer. He was a series regular in The Saddle Club, McLeod's Daughters, and Mistresses. He is also known for his role as Daniel Fitzgerald in Neighbours. He played Seattle Fire Battalion Chief Lucas Ripley on ABC's TV series Station 19. He played Colin in the 2024 series of Troppo.

== Career ==
Tucker attended National Theatre, Melbourne.

For his role as Dave Brewer on the drama McLeod's Daughters, he apprenticed with a real country veterinarian to research his role.

Tucker's onstage credits include The Woman in Black in 2006, and The Great Gatsby playing Jay Gatsby in 1997.

From 1999 to 2000, he played the role of Daniel Fitzgerald in Neighbours, a role which he returned to in late 2007. In June 2009, it was announced that he would be leaving the show to pursue acting opportunities in the United States. In addition to Neighbours, Tucker played Max in The Saddle Club. Tucker also had a minor role in the 2005 film The Great Raid.

After securing a green card via the visa lottery, Tucker relocated to the United States. He appeared in an episode of Legend of the Seeker, followed by roles in CSI: NY and CSI: Crime Scene Investigation.

In 2012, Tucker appeared in Spartacus: Vengeance and had a guest role in Castle. He also contributed to the ABC self-help series Agony Uncles, which sees men sharing views about dating. Tucker went on to appear in episodes of Rizzoli & Isles and NCIS, as well as Off The Map and the TV film, Criminal Behaviour. From 2013 until 2016, Tucker played Alyssa Milano's husband Harry Davis in US drama series Mistresses. He made a guest appearance in drama series This Is Us in 2017.

During 2018 and 2019, Tucker played Battalion Chief Lucas Ripley on Station 19 for 17 episodes. He starred in the 2021 miniseries Lie With Me alongside Charlie Brooks. That same year he had a large supporting role as boom operator Linus in dance dramedy The Big Leap. In 2023, Tucker joined the cast of the Shondaland mystery-drama series The Residence as Australian Foreign Minister David Rylance.

On 4 June 2025, Tucker was named in the extended cast for upcoming television series Gnomes.

== Personal life ==
Born on 21 May 1972 to Ken and Janice Tucker, he grew up in the Yarra Valley of Victoria with his three siblings – Nicky, Mark and David.

== Filmography ==
=== Film ===
Year	Title	Role	Notes
1984	Among the Cinders		
2000	Mallboy	Darren	
2003	The Extreme Team	Bookman	
2004	Alpha Male		Short film
2005	The Great Raid	Major Robert Lapham	
2008	Zack's Life		
2010	I Love You Too	Julian	
2013	Thor: The Dark World	Einherjar Guard	
2015	Mine	Sebastian	Short film

=== Television ===
Year	Title	Role	Notes
1992–1993	Neighbours	Davo	Recurring role
1994–1995	Neighbours	Builder/Worker	Guest role
1996	The Man from Snowy River	Ted	aka Snowy River: The McGregor Saga; Season 2, episode 18: "The Cutting Edge"
1996	Neighbours	Ned Goodman	Recurring role
1997	The Last of the Ryans	Detective	TV film
1998	State Coroner	Miles Penfield	Season 2, episode 4: "The Gift of Life"
1998–2003	Blue Heelers	Sgt. Peter Baynes / Steve Camilleri	3 episodes
1999	Thunderstone	Holocop	Season 2, 4 episodes
1999–2000, 2007–2010	Neighbours	Daniel Fitzgerald	Series regular
2000	Halifax f.p: The Spider and the Fly	Scott Lovejoy	TV film
2001	Code Red		TV film
2001	Blonde	Actor at White Party	Miniseries, 2 episodes
2001	Backlands (aka Abschied in den Tod)	Mark Penhalligan	TV film
2001–2003	The Saddle Club	Maximillion "Max" Regnery	Main role
2002	The Lost World	Rixxel	Season 2, episode 17: "The Imposters"
2002	The Outsider	Ben Yoder	TV film
2003–2006	McLeod's Daughters	Dave Brewer	Recurring role (season 3); Main role (seasons 4–6)
2010	Legend Of The Seeker	Phillip	Season 2, episode 10: "Perdition"
2010	CSI: NY	Theodore Westwick	Season 6, episode 1: "The 34th Floor"
2010	CSI: Crime Scene Investigation	Kyle Adams	Season 11, episode 6: "Cold Blooded"
2011	Off the Map	Dr. Jonah Simpson	Season 1, 2 episodes
2011	NCIS	USN Lieutenant Commander Geoffrey Brett	Season 9, episode 4: "Enemy on the Hill"
2011	Rizzoli & Isles	Steve Sanner	Season 2, episode 13: "Seventeen Ain't So Sweet"
2011	Criminal Behavior	Gavin Collins	TV film
2012	Spartacus: Vengeance	Publius Varinius	Season 2, 5 episodes
2012	Castle	Detective Inspector Colin Hunt	Season 4, episode 20: "The Limey"
2012	Agony Uncles	Himself	
2012	Lowdown	Kade Thompson	Season 2, episode 3: "One Fine Gay"
2013–2016	Mistresses	Harry Davis (main role)	Seasons 1–4, 52 episodes
2017	Newton's Law	Callum Docker	Miniseries, 6 episodes
2017	The Americans	Benjamin Stobert	Season 5, 5 episodes
2017	This Is Us	Band Manager	Season 2, episode 1: "A Father's Advice"
2017	Love You More	Simon	TV film
2018	The Brave	Therapist Xander Martin	Season 1, episode 11: "Grounded"
2018–2020	Station 19	Fire Chief Lucas Ripley	Seasons 1–3, 16 episodes
2019	Grey's Anatomy	Fire Chief Lucas Ripley	Season 15, episode 23: "What I Did For Love"
2020	AJ and the Queen	Officer Peter Dembrowski	Season 1, episode 4: "Louisville"
2021	Atypical	Niles Blanderman	Season 4, episode 5: "Dead Dreams"
2021	Lie With Me	Jake Fallmont (main role)	Miniseries, 4 episodes
2021	The Big Leap	Linus	Season 1, 5 episodes
2021–24	Arcane	Singed (voice)	Seasons 1–2, 6 episodes
2022	Dynasty	Ben Carrington	Season 5, 4 episodes
2024	Troppo	Colin	Season 2, 8 episodes
2025	The Residence	David Rylance, Australian Foreign Minister	Limited series
2026	Blue Murder Motel	Peter Coleman	Season 1, 8 episodes
2026	Fire Country	Alexi	Season 4, 2 episodes
2026	Gnomes	TBA	TV series

== Theatre ==
Year	Title	Role	Venue / Co.
1994	Florence Nightingale	Henry Nicholson	National Theatrette, Melbourne
1994	The New Adventures of Robin Hood		Studley Park Boathouse, Melbourne
1995	The Rimers of Eldrich	Josh Johnson	National Theatrette, Melbourne
1996	The Chapel Perilous	Thomas Father	National Theatrette, Melbourne
1996	The Hostage	Pat	National Theatrette, Melbourne
1996	The Hot l Baltimore	Bill Lewis	National Theatrette, Melbourne
1996	Romeo and Juliet		National Theatrette, Melbourne
1997	Life During Wartime		Melbourne Athenaeum
1997	The Great Gatsby	Jay Gatsby	Rippon Lea, Melbourne
2006	The Woman in Black	The Actor – Young Kipps	Theatre Royal, Sydney, Comedy Theatre, Melbourne, Playhouse, Brisbane, Her Majesty's Theatre, Adelaide, Burswood Theatre, Perth
