= Jason Winston George =

American actor and model (born 1972)

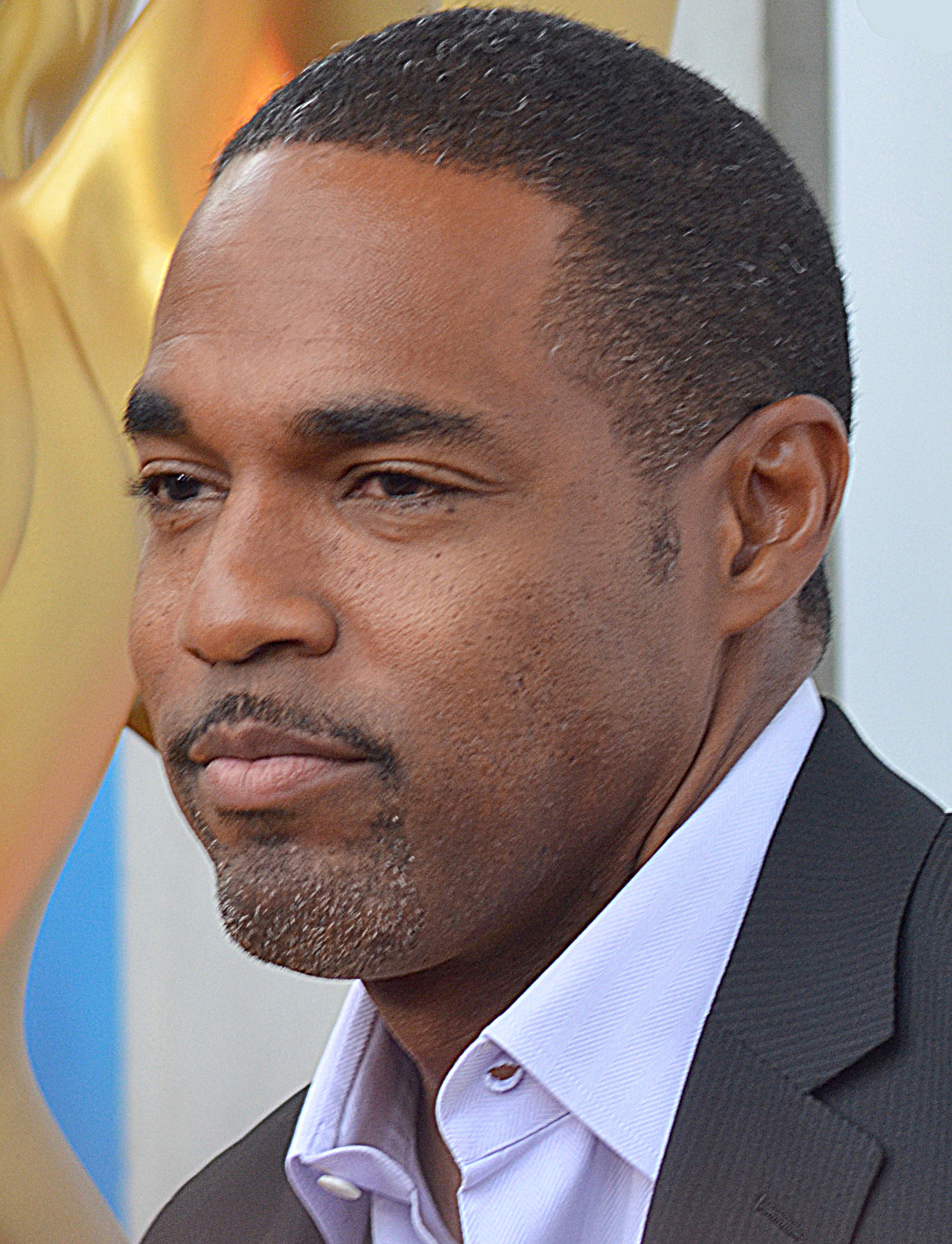
- George at the 2016 37th College Television Awards
- Born: February 9, 1972 (age 54); Virginia Beach, Virginia, U.S.
- Other name: Jason George
- Education: University of Virginia
- Occupations: Actor, model
- Years active: 1997–present
- Spouse: Vandana Khanna (m. 1999)
- Children: 3

Jason Winston George (born February 9, 1972) is an American actor. He is best known for his roles as Michael Bourne on the NBC daytime soap opera Sunset Beach, as Jeremiah Thurgood "J.T." Hunter on the UPN television sitcom Eve, as Dr. Otis Cole on ABC's Off the Map, and as Dr. Ben Warren on Grey's Anatomy and its spinoff Station 19.

== Life and career ==
George was born in Virginia Beach, Virginia. He graduated from the University of Virginia in 1994 with a double major in Rhetoric and Communication Studies and Drama. He met his wife Vandana Khanna, an Indian-American poet, while studying at the University of Virginia. They were married on July 10, 1999, and have three children.

In 1996, George was cast as lifeguard Michael Bourne on the soap opera Sunset Beach, a role he played from the series' first episode on January 6, 1997, until the show ended on December 31, 1999.

In 2000, he made a successful stage appearance in Rita Dove's drama The Darker Face of the Earth at the Fountain Theatre in Los Angeles, where he played the male lead of Augustus.

From 2001 to 2002, he played the rapper Status Quo in Off Centre. In 2002, George had a role in Clockstoppers, a film directed by Jonathan Frakes. He has also appeared on many ABC series, such as What About Brian, Eli Stone, Eastwick, Off the Map, Grey's Anatomy, and guest starred on Castle and Desperate Housewives. He also was cast as a regular on the ABC series Mistresses. He currently stars in Grey's Anatomy as Dr Ben Warren, a surgical resident and former firefighter of Seattle Fire Station 19.

== Filmography ==
=== Film ===
Year	Title	Role	Notes
1998	Fallen	College Kid	
1999	Jigsaw	Boxing Opponent	Video
2002	The Climb	Derrick Williams	
2002	Clockstoppers	Richard	
2002	Barbershop	Kevin	
2003	Straighten Up America	Dennis	Short
2005	Bewitched	E! Anchor	
2005	Good Vibrations	Carl	Short
2006	You Did What?	Ben	
2007	The Box	Kirby Ferguson	
2007	Three Can Play That Game	Byron Thompson	
2008	Race	Luke Harrison	Bollywood film
2008	Broken Window	Walt	
2012	Playing for Keeps	Chip Johnston	
2013	Killing Vivian	Kevin	Short
2016	Sunday	Todd Morgan	Short
2017	Kidnap	David Dyson	
2018	Breaking In	Justin Russell	
2018	Indivisible	Michael Lewis	

=== Television ===
Year	Title	Role	Notes
1998–1999	Moesha	Channing Lawrence	Guest: 2 episodes
1997–1999	Sunset Beach	Michael Bourne	Main cast (seasons 1–3): 352 episodes
2000	Roswell	Agent Matheson	Guest: 2 episodes
2000	Arliss	Charlie Vergotti	Episode: "A Breed Apart"
2000	Girlfriends	Charles	Episode: "Toe Sucking"
2000–2001	Titans	Scott Littleton	Main cast (season 1): 12 episodes
2001	Friends	The Fireman	Episode: "The One Where They're Up All Night"
2001–2002	Off Centre	Nathan 'Status Quo' Cole	Main cast (seasons 1–2): 27 episodes
2002	Jeremiah	Kwame	Episode: "Moon in Gemini"
2002–2003	Half & Half	Miles	Guest: 2 episodes
2003	Platinum	Jackson Rhames	Main cast (season 1): 3 episodes
2003	Abby	Ted	Episode: "Ted & Carrol & Will & Abby"
2003	She Spies	Sammy August	Episode: "First Date"
2003	Boomtown	Thomas Paltrow	Episode: "Inadmissible"
2003–2006	Eve	Jeremiah Thurgood "J.T." Hunter	Main cast (seasons 1–3): 66 episodes
2005	Without a Trace	Adisa Teno	Guest: 2 episodes
2005–2006	Stargate SG-1	Jolan	Guest: 2 episodes
2006–2007	What About Brian	Jimmy	Main cast (season 1): 18 episodes
2007	Shark	Ray Harkin	Episode: "The Wrath of Khan"
2007	House	Brock Hoyt	Episode: "Words and Deeds"
2007–2008	ER	Ethan Mackiner	Guest: 2 episodes
2008–2009	Eli Stone	Keith Bennett	Main cast (seasons 1–2): 20 episodes
2009	CSI: Miami	Steve Bowers	Episode: "Out of Time"
2009–2010	Eastwick	Max Brody	Recurring: 6 episodes
2010	The Deadpool Series: Fan Films	Man #2	Episode: "The Imaginarium of Dr. Deadpool"
2010–present	Grey's Anatomy	Dr. Benjamin "Ben" Warren	Recurring role (seasons 6, 8–11, 15–20); Guest (season 7); Main cast (seasons 12–14, 21–present) 151 episodes
2011	Off the Map	Dr. Otis Cole	Main cast (season 1): 13 episodes
2011	Castle	Charles Kelvin	Episode: "To Love and Die in L.A."
2011	Desperate Housewives	Edgar	Episode: "Come on Over for Dinner"
2011	Against the Wall	Tony Miles	Recurring: 3 episodes
2011	The Closer	Marvin Evans	Episode: "Silent Partner"
2013	Witches of East End	Detective Adam Noble	Recurring: 5 episodes
2013–2014	Hit the Floor	Michael	Recurring: 4 episode
2013–2016	Mistresses	Dominic Taylor	Main cast (seasons 1–2); Guest (seasons 3–4): 28 episodes
2015	With This Ring	Shawn	Television movie
2015	CSI: Cyber	Colin Vickner	Recurring: 2 episodes
2017	Laura	Dr. Bernard / Gary	Episodes: "Is There a Doctor in the House?" and "Life Coach"
2018–2024	Station 19	Dr. Benjamin "Ben" Warren	Main role (season 1-7); 105 episodes
2019–2022	Love, Death & Robots	Afriel	Episode: "Swarm"

== Awards and nominations ==
Year	Award	Category	Nominated work	Result
1999	26th Daytime Emmy Awards	Outstanding Younger Actor in a Drama Series	Sunset Beach	Nominated
