= Rochelle Aytes =

American actress and model

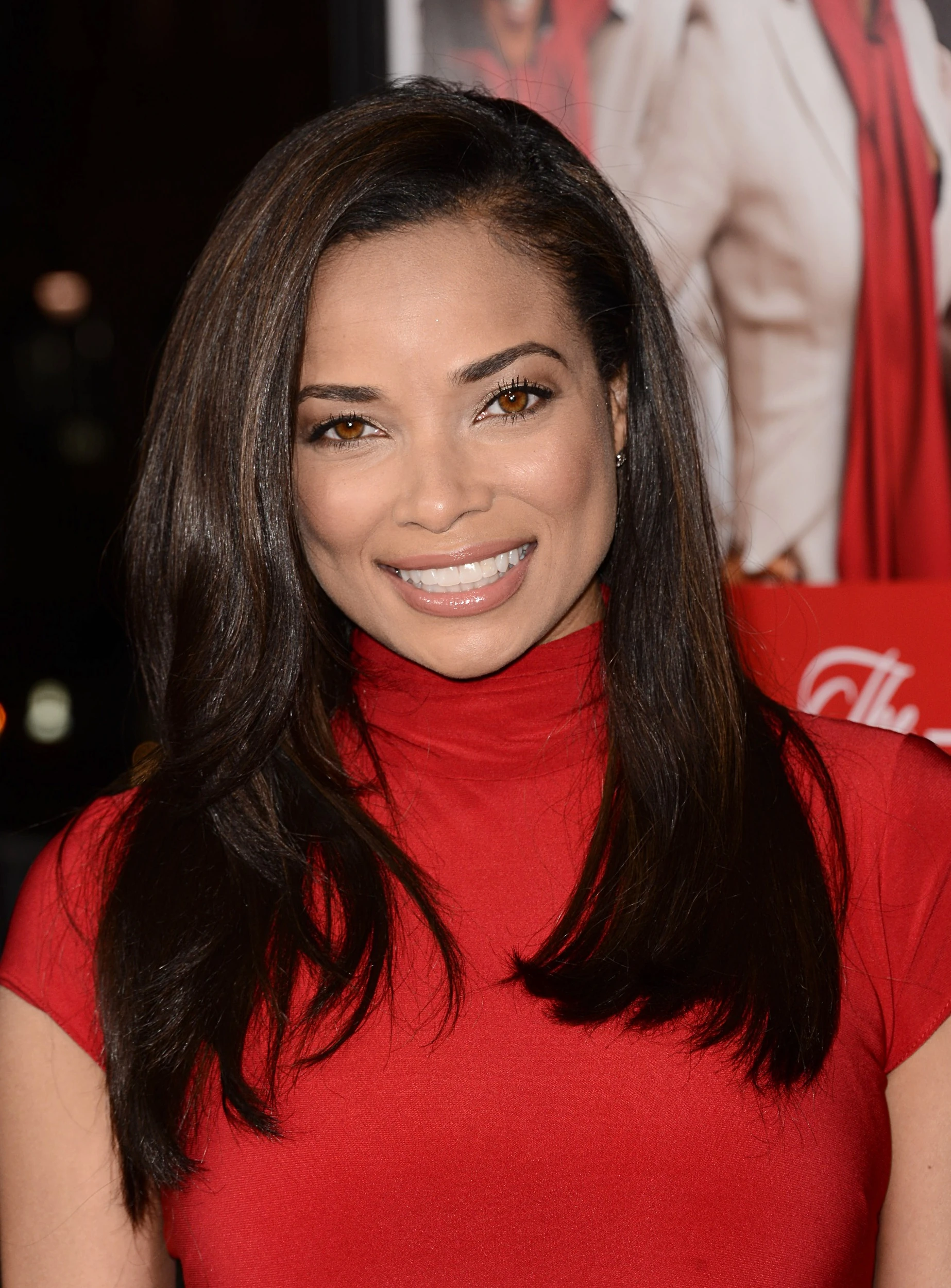
- Aytes in 2011
- Born: New York City, U.S.
- Education: State University of New York, Purchase (BFA)
- Occupations: Actress, model
- Years active: 1999–present
- Spouse: CJ Lindsey (m. 2016)

Rochelle Aytes is an American actress and model. She is best known for her role as April Malloy on the ABC drama series Mistresses (2013–16) and as the voice of Rochelle in the critically acclaimed video game Left 4 Dead 2 (2009). Aytes also starred in the auto-biography story film of TLC titled CrazySexyCool: The TLC Story as Perri "Pebbles" Reid, short-lived series Drive and The Forgotten (2009–10), as well as Criminal Minds and Work It. In film, Aytes has appeared in White Chicks, Madea's Family Reunion and Trick 'r Treat. Aytes also had a recurring role as Agent Greer, an ex-CIA officer, on the CBS television series Hawaii Five-0. From 2019 to 2024, Aytes played Nichelle Carmichael in the CBS action series S.W.A.T.. Since 2025, she has portrayed Dr. Mary Morstan in the CBS mystery-medical drama series Watson.

== Early life and education ==
Aytes was born in Harlem, New York City, and attended Fiorello H. LaGuardia High School. She graduated with a Bachelor of Arts in Fine Arts from State University of New York at Purchase college. She began her career as a model and has appeared in commercials for McDonald's, L'Oreal, Coca-Cola and Mercedes-Benz.

== Career ==
She began her acting career doing commercials for Coca-Cola, McDonalds, L'Oreal and Mercedes Benz. In 2003, she made her television debut as a hostess on an episode of Sex and the City, which led to small roles on the shows Jonny Zero, House of Payne and Half & Half.

Aytes made her film debut in the 2004 comedy White Chicks, as Denise Porter. She is also known for playing Lisa Breaux in Tyler Perry's Madea's Family Reunion, where Aytes plays a woman who is caught in a relationship in which her fiancé (Blair Underwood) beats and threatens her. In 2006, she played Nicole Jamieson in the test pilot episodes of Tyler Perry's House of Payne. She also provides the voice for Rochelle in Left 4 Dead 2. In 2007, Aytes guest starred in the Fox series Bones as Felicia Saroyan, the sister of Lab Supervisor, Cam. She starred in the independent film Trick 'r Treat. She played role Leigh Barnthouse in the 2007 Fox series Drive. She also played Tara Kole in the TV show NCIS from CBS. Aytes also appeared in the TNT drama series Dark Blue in 2010.

Aytes was a regular cast member in the ABC drama series The Forgotten from 2009 to 2010, playing Detective Grace Russell who teams up with a volunteer group, including former Chicago police detective, Christian Slater, to solve cases of missing or unidentified homicide victims. From 2010 to 2011, she had a recurring role in the ABC series Detroit 1-8-7 as prosecutor Alice Williams, until her character was murdered in the episode "Key to the City", which aired on January 11, 2011. In 2011, Aytes guest starred in three episodes as Amber James, the former girlfriend of Keith Watson, in the seventh season of ABC comedy-drama Desperate Housewives. She also starred in the short-lived ABC sitcom Work It in 2012.

In 2012, Aytes was cast as one of the four leads, along with Alyssa Milano, Yunjin Kim and Jes Macallan, in the ABC drama series Mistresses about the lives of four female friends and their involvement in an array of illicit and complex relationships. The series premiered on June 3, 2013. Aytes played the role of Perri "Pebbles" Reid in the 2013 biographical film CrazySexyCool: The TLC Story about the R&B and hip hop musical trio TLC. In 2013, she also began appearing as Dr. Savannah Hayes, the girlfriend of Special Agent Derek Morgan (Shemar Moore) on the CBS crime thriller series Criminal Minds. When Moore moved to S.W.A.T., her character was written out. However, Aytes was then cast as his character Hondo's girlfriend Nichelle on S.W.A.T. as well, starting in season 3. She was promoted to the main cast in season 6.

In 2024, Aytes was cast as a lead in the CBS medical-mystery series Watson, playing Mary Morstan. As a result of her casting, she had to depart the main cast of S.W.A.T. for the eight and final season, although she remained as a guest star.

== Filmography ==
=== Film ===
Year	Title	Role	Notes
1999	A Hot Dog Program	Customer	
2004	White Chicks	Denise Porter	
2006	Madea's Family Reunion	Lisa	
2006	13 Graves	Karen	TV movie
2007	Trick 'r Treat	Maria	
2011	The Inheritance	Lily	
2013	CrazySexyCool: The TLC Story	Perri "Pebbles" Reid	TV movie
2013	Stupid Hype	Tina	TV movie
2015	My Favorite Five	Hailey Colburn	
2017	Doomsday	Elle	TV movie
2020	Magic Camp	Zoe Moses	
2020	A Christmas Tree Grows in Colorado	Erin	TV movie
2021	Redemption in Cherry Springs	Melanie Abrams	TV movie
2021	The Men in My Life	Tish Helms	

=== Television ===
Year	Title	Role	Notes
2003	Sex and the City	Hostess	Episode: "Great Sexpectations"
2005	Jonny Zero	Keisha	Episode: "I Did It All for the Nooky"
2005	My Wife and Kids	Nurse	Episode: "The 'V' Story"
2006	ER	Tamara	Episode: "Split Decisions"
2006	CSI: NY	Sienna	Episode: "Stuck on You"
2006	Half & Half	Yolanda	Episode: "The Big Who You Gonna Call Episode"
2007	Day Break	Woman on Plane	Episode: "What If He's Free?"
2007	Las Vegas	Carley	Episode: "When Life Gives You Lemon Bars"
2007	Bones	Felicia Saroyan	Episode: "Intern in the Incinerator"
2007	Drive	Leigh Bartnhouse	Main Cast
2008	Dirt	Jasmine Ford	Recurring Cast: Season 2
2008	Shark	Karla Ballantine	Episode: "Leaving Las Vegas"
2009	NCIS	Tara Kole	Episode: "Knockout"
2009–2010	The Forgotten	Grace Russell	Main Cast
2010	Dark Blue	Eva	Recurring Cast: Season 2
2010–2011	Detroit 1-8-7	Alice Williams	Recurring Cast
2011	Desperate Housewives	Amber James	Recurring Cast: Season 7
2011	White Collar	Isabelle Wilson	Episode: "As You Were"
2012	Work It	Vanessa Warner	Main Cast
2013–2016	Criminal Minds	Savannah Morgan	Recurring Cast: Season 9–11
2013–2016	Mistresses	April Malloy	Main Cast 52 episodes
2017–2018	Designated Survivor	Senator Cowling	Recurring Cast: Season 2
2018–2019	Hawaii Five-0	Agent Greer	Recurring Cast: Season 9
2019	Dolly Parton's Heartstrings	Scarlett	Episode: "Cracker Jack"
2019	The Purge	Michelle Moore	Recurring Cast: Season 2
2019–24	S.W.A.T.	Nichelle Carmichael	Recurring Cast: Season 3–5, Main Cast: Season 6–7, Guest: Season 8
2022	Monarch	Mackenzie	Recurring Cast
2025–26	Watson	Dr. Mary Morstan	Main Cast

Key
†	Denotes series/miniseries that have not yet been released

=== Video games ===
Year	Title	Role
2009	Left 4 Dead 2	Rochelle
2013	Resident Evil 6	Rochelle
