= Jes Macallan =

American actress

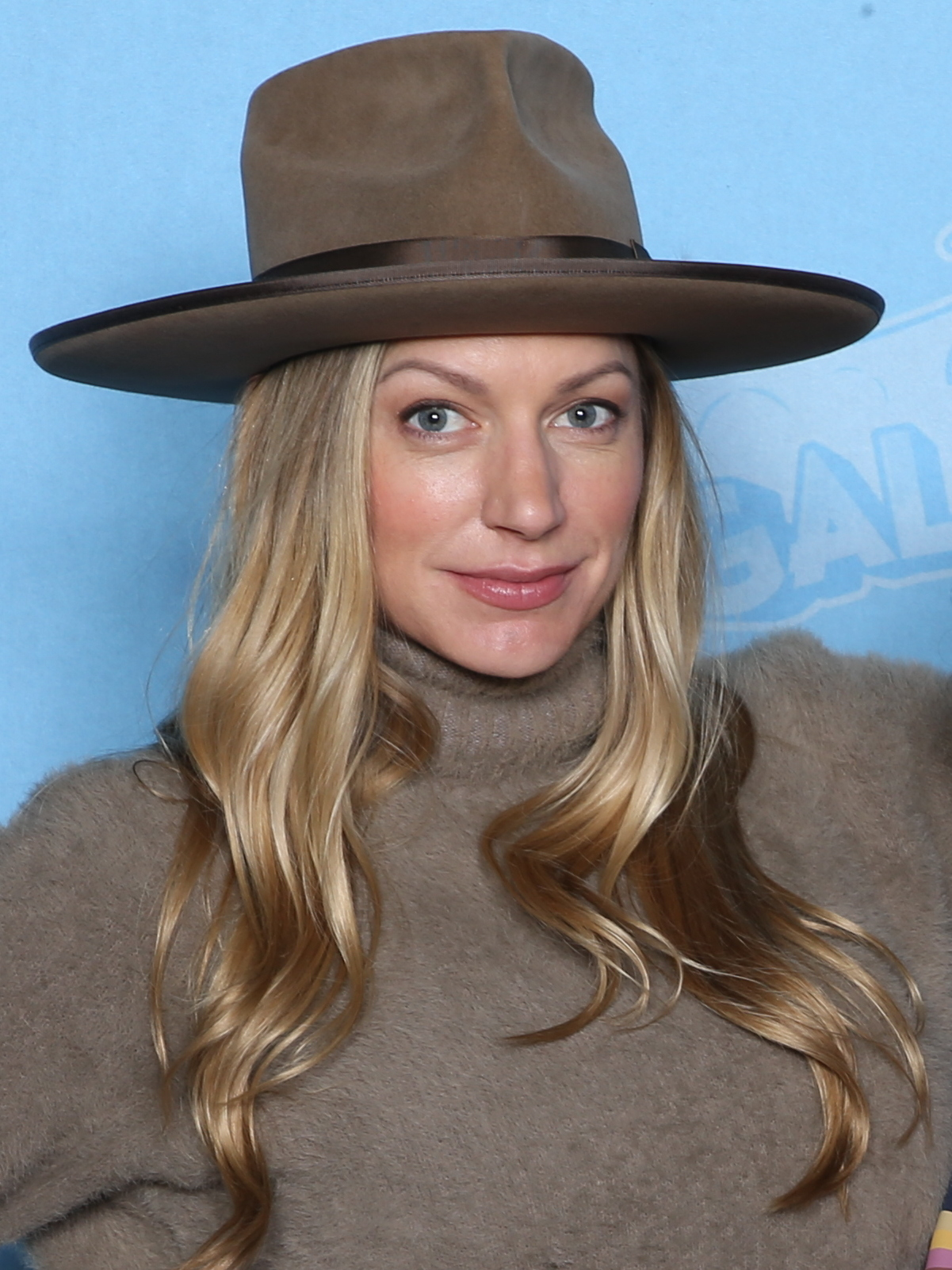
- Macallan in 2022
- Occupations: Actress, director
- Years active: 2008–present
- Spouse: Jason Gray-Stanford (m. 2012; div. 2017)
- Partner(s): Nicholas Bishop (2021–present; engaged)
- Children: 1

Jes Macallan is an American actress. She is best known for her roles as Josslyn Carver in ABC drama series Mistresses and Ava Sharpe in The CW superhero comedy-drama Legends of Tomorrow.

== Career ==
Macallan is an actor and director. From 2013 to 2016, she starred in ABC's drama series, Mistresses. She starred in The CW's Legends of Tomorrow from 2017 to 2022. She directed two episodes of Legends of Tomorrow, as well as episodes of All Rise and All American.

In 2016, Macallan wrote, produced, and directed the short film Self, E. She submitted the film as part of her application to the Warner Bros. television directors workshop. She was accepted into the workshop and graduated in 2019.

== Personal life ==
Macallan was married to Jason Gray-Stanford from 2012 to 2017. Macallan and her fiancé Nic Bishop have a son.

== Filmography ==
=== Film ===
Year	Title	Role	Notes
2008	Ocean's 7-11	Dustee	
2008	One, Two, Many	Woman in bed	
2008	Identity Crisis	Sandy	
2009	Behaving Badly	Cocktail Waitress	
2009	Hired Gun	American Newscaster #2	
2011	Being Bin Laden	Ali	
2011	The Football Fairy	Kelsey	Short film
2014	Kiss Me	Erica	
2015	Thirst	Claire Taylor	
2016	The Engagement Clause	Carrie Tate	
2019	Self E	Director	Short Film
2026	California Scenario	Kelly	

=== Television ===
Year	Title	Role	Notes
2011	Shameless	Tammy	Episode: "Casey Casden"
2011	Justified	Cassie	2 episodes
2011	The Protector	Rachel	Episode: "Affairs"
2012	Grey's Anatomy	Hillary	Episode: "Hope for the Hopeless"
2012	Crash & Burn	Kelly Mitchell	Television film
2012	NCIS: Los Angeles	Megan Stevens / Anya Fournier	Episode: "Blye, K., Part 2"
2012	Femme Fatales	Susan Voight	Episode: "One Man's Death"
2014	The Mentor	Elizabeth	Television film
2013–2016	Mistresses	Josslyn Carver	Main role
2014–2015	Red Band Society	Ashley Cole	2 episodes
2016	Married by Christmas	Carrie	Television film
2017–2022	Legends of Tomorrow	Ava Sharpe	Recurring role (season 3); Main role (seasons 4–7); Directed 2 episodes
2017	An Uncommon Grace	Grace Conner	Television film
2023	The Company You Keep	Martha Pope	1 episode
2025–2026	Tracker	Willa Simms	2 episodes

=== Director ===
Year	Title	Note(s)
2019	Self E	Short
2021-22	Legends of Tomorrow	2 episodes
2022-26	All American	5 episodes
2023	All Rise	Episode: "We Are Family"
2024	All American: Homecoming	2 episodes
2025	Found	Episode: "Missing While a Casualty"
