= Yunjin Kim =

South Korean and American actress (born 1973)

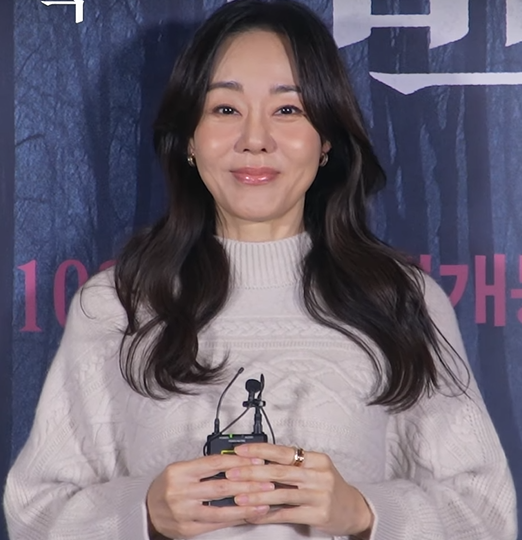
- Kim in 2022
- Born: November 7, 1973 (age 53); Seoul, South Korea
- Citizenship: South Korea; United States
- Education: Boston University (BFA)
- Occupation: Actress
- Years active: 1996–present
- Agent: Zion Entertainment
- Spouse: Park Jeong-hyeok (m. 2010)

Korean name
- Hangul: 김윤진
- RR: Gim Yunjin
- MR: Kim Yunjin

Yunjin Kim (Korean: 김윤진; born November 7, 1973) is a South Korean and American actress. She is best known for her role as North Korean spy Bang-Hee in the South Korean film Shiri (1999) and Sun-Hwa Kwon on the American television series Lost (2004–2010). Her other notable works include Seven Days (2007), Harmony (2010), and Ode to My Father (2014).

== Early life ==
Kim was born in Pyeongchang-dong, Jongno District, Seoul, South Korea. She emigrated to the United States with her family in 1983–1984. They lived in Staten Island, New York. She joined the middle school drama club in the 7th grade and performed in the musical My Fair Lady.

Kim attended high school at the prestigious Fiorello H. LaGuardia High School of Music & Art and Performing Arts in Manhattan, graduating in 1989. From there, she went on to study drama at the London Academy of Performing Arts (LAPA), and later earned her BFA degree in drama at Boston University. She is also a trained dancer and martial arts fighter.

== Career ==
After graduation, Kim played several minor parts on MTV, in soap opera-style dramas on ABC, and on the off-Broadway stage. In 1996, Kim decided to return to Korea, where she starred in Splendid Holiday (1997). She was then cast in the TV drama Wedding Dress. Her breakthrough debut came in the 1999 film Shiri, South Korea's first blockbuster film. Shiri became the highest-grossing film in South Korean history at the time. In November 2000, she continued her association with Kang Je-gyu in The Legend of Gingko.

After acting in a Japanese film and a feature set in Los Angeles, Kim appeared in the sci-fi feature Yesterday. Then in 2002, Kim took the lead role in the feature film debut of documentarist Byun Young-ju, Ardor.

In 2004, Kim started appearing in the U.S. television series Lost, which ran for six seasons.

In 2006 she was featured on the cover of Stuff, as well as an inside spread. In 2006, Maxim named Kim number 98 on its annual Hot 100 List.

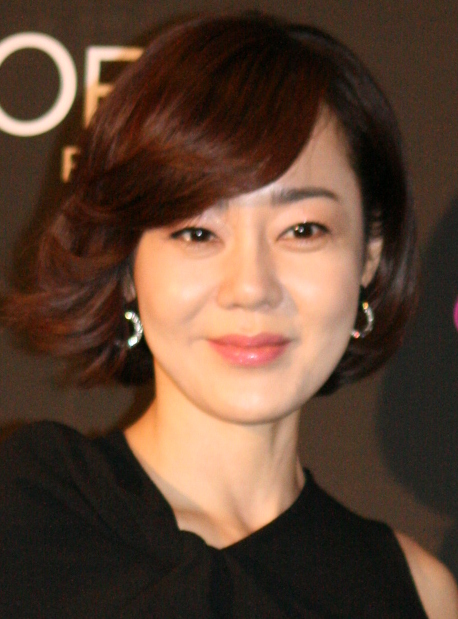
Kim in 2011

In 2013, she had a leading role in the ABC drama series Mistresses.

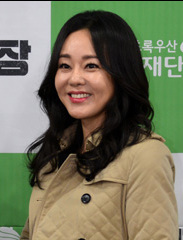
Kim in 2015

In 2018, Kim returned to South Korean television by headlining the series Ms. Ma, Nemesis.

In 2022, she starred as Seon Woo-jin in the South Korean remake of Money Heist, Money Heist: Korea – Joint Economic Area.

In 2023, she acted as Principal Jina Lim in English-Korean Netflix TV Series, XO, Kitty.

In 2025, she appeared in the Sony Pictures Animation/Netflix animated musical film, KPop Demon Hunters as the voice of Celine.

== Personal life ==
Kim married her former manager Park Jeong-hyeok in March 2010 on the island of Oahu, after shooting her final scenes for Lost.

== Filmography ==
=== Film ===
| Year | Title | Role | Notes | Ref. |
|---|---|---|---|---|
| 1999 | Shiri | Lee Myung-hyun / Lee Bang-hee | | |
| 2000 | The Legend of Gingko | Yeon | | |
| 2001 | Rush! | Seo-yeong | | |
| 2002 | Iron Palm | Ji-ni | | |
| 2002 | Yesterday | Kim Hisu / No Hisu | | |
| 2002 | Ardor | Mi-heun | | |
| 2005 | Diary of June | Seo Yun-hee | | |
| 2007 | Seven Days | Yoo Ji-yeon | | |
| 2010 | Harmony | Jeong-hye | | |
| 2011 | Heartbeat | Chae Yeon-hee | | |
| 2012 | The Neighbors | Kyung-hee | | |
| 2014 | Ode to My Father | Young-ja | | |
| 2017 | House of the Disappeared | Kang Mi-hee | | |
| 2020 | Pawn | Myung-ja | Cameo | |
| 2022 | Confession | Yang Shin-ae | | |
| 2024 | Dog Days | Jeong-ah | | |
| 2025 | KPop Demon Hunters | Celine | Voice | |

=== Television ===
Key
| † | Denotes television productions that have not yet been released |

| Year | Title | Role | Notes | Ref. |
|---|---|---|---|---|
| 1996 | Splendid Holiday | | | |
| 1997 | Foreboding | Jang Se-young | | |
| 1998 | Wedding Dress Drama | Gina | | |
| 1999 | Love in 3 Colors | Jang Hee-ju | | |
| 2004–2010 | Lost | Sun-Hwa Kwon | | |
| 2013–2016 | Mistresses | Karen Kim | | |
| 2018 | Ms. Ma, Nemesis | Ms. Ma / Ma Ji Won | | |
| 2022 | Money Heist: Korea – Joint Economic Area | Seon Woo-jin | Part 1–2 | |
| 2023 | XO, Kitty | Principal Jina Lim | Season 1 | |
| 2024 | Station 19 | Jeonghee Lee | Episode: "Ushers of the New World" | |
| 2026 | Notes from the Last Row | Ahn Eun-joo | | |

=== Video games ===
| Year | Title | Voice role | Ref. |
|---|---|---|---|
| 2007 | Lost: Via Domus | Sun-Hwa Kwon | |
| 2012 | Sleeping Dogs | Tiffany Kim | |

== Accolades ==
=== Awards and nominations ===
| Year | Award | Category | Recipient | Result |
|---|---|---|---|---|
| 1999 | 35th Baeksang Arts Awards | Best New Actress (Film) | Shiri | Nominated |
| 1999 | 36th Grand Bell Awards | Best New Actress | Shiri | Won |
| 1999 | 19th Korean Association of Film Critics Awards | Best New Actress | Shiri | Won |
| 1999 | 22nd Golden Cinematography Awards | Best New Actress | Shiri | Won |
| 1999 | 20th Blue Dragon Film Awards | Best New Actress | Shiri | Nominated |
| 2000 | 21st Blue Dragon Film Awards | Best Supporting Actress | The Legend of Gingko | Nominated |
| 2002 | 23rd Blue Dragon Film Awards | Best Leading Actress | Milae | Won |
| 2002 | 5th Director's Cut Awards | Best Actress | Milae | Won |
| 2002 | 7th Women Viewers Film Awards | Best Actress | Milae | Won |
| 2003 | 40th Grand Bell Awards | Best Actress | Milae | Nominated |
| 2003 | 2nd Korean Film Awards | Best Actress | Milae | Nominated |
| 2003 | 39th Baeksang Arts Awards | Best Actress (Film) | Milae | Nominated |
| 2006 | Asian Excellence Awards | Outstanding Television Actress | Lost | Won |
| 2006 | 12th Screen Actors Guild Awards | Outstanding Performance by an Ensemble in a Drama Series | Lost | Won |
| 2007 | 28th Blue Dragon Film Awards | Best Dresser Award | —N/a | Won |
| 2008 | 2nd Asian Film Awards | Best Actress | Seven Days | Nominated |
| 2008 | 44th Baeksang Arts Awards | Best Actress (Film) | Seven Days | Nominated |
| 2008 | 45th Grand Bell Awards | Best Actress | Seven Days | Won |
| 2008 | 5th Max Movie Awards | Best Actress | Seven Days | Won |
| 2008 | 29th Blue Dragon Film Awards | Best Leading Actress | Seven Days | Nominated |
| 2008 | 7th Korean Film Awards | Best Actress | Seven Days | Nominated |
| 2009 | 35th Saturn Awards | Best Supporting Actress | Lost | Nominated |
| 2010 | 47th Grand Bell Awards | Best Actress | Harmony | Nominated |
| 2010 | 31st Blue Dragon Film Awards | Best Leading Actress | Harmony | Nominated |
| 2015 | 52nd Grand Bell Awards | Best Actress | Ode to My Father | Nominated |
| 2015 | 8th Seoul Senior Citizen Movie Awards | Movie in couple Award (with Hwang Jung-min) | Ode to My Father | Won |
| 2017 | 2017 Korean Film Shining Star Awards | Star Award | House of the Disappeared | Won |
| 2017 | 1st The Seoul Awards | Best Actress | House of the Disappeared | Nominated |
| 2018 | SBS Drama Awards | Top Excellence Award, Actress in a Daily and Weekend Drama | Ms. Ma, Nemesis | Nominated |
| 2023 | 43rd Korean Association of Film Critics Awards | Newcomer Criticism Award | —N/a | Won |

=== Listicles ===
Name of publisher, year listed, name of listicle, and placement
| Publisher | Year | Listicle | Rank | Ref. |
|---|---|---|---|---|
| Korean Film Council | 2021 | Korean Actors 200 (Note: Introduces 200 actors that best represent the present and future of Korean cinema to the people in the film industry all over the world.) | Included | |
| The Screen | 2009 | 1984–2008 Top Box Office Powerhouse Actors in Korean Movies | 32nd | |
| The Screen | 2019 | 2009–2019 Top Box Office Powerhouse Actors in Korean Movies | 34th | |
