= Little Engine Productions =

US production company

- Formerly: Roundtable Entertainment (1998–2007)
- Industry: Motion pictures television
- Founded: July 24, 1998; 28 years ago
- Founder: Gina Matthews
- Headquarters: Los Angeles, California, United States
- Key people: Gina Matthews; Grant Scharbo

Little Engine Productions (formerly Roundtable Entertainment) is a Los Angeles–based production company started by Gina Matthews in 1998.

== History ==
The origin of Little Engine Productions dates back to 1998 when Matthews, the former head of Tavel Entertainment's literary and feature department, started Roundtable Entertainment. In 2007, Matthews and co-founder Grant Scharbo rebranded Roundtable Entertainment as Little Engine Productions.

The company's first feature film was 1998's Urban Legend, written by Silvio Horta. Other film producing credits include What Women Want, 13 Going on 30, and Isn’t It Romantic.

The company's first television series, Popular, premiered on The WB in 1999. The teen comedy-drama starred Leslie Bibb and Carly Pope and was co-created by Matthews and Ryan Murphy. The show was named one of the "26 Best Cult TV Shows Ever" by Entertainment Weekly.

The team reunited with Horta in 2001 for SyFy's The Chronicle, and again in 2002 for UPN's Jake 2.0. Signing deals to produce TV shows for Viacom Productions in 2002, 20th Century Fox Television in 2005 and ITV Studios in 2016, the company’s television credits during this period include The Gates, Missing, Rush, and Saints & Strangers.

Little Engine ventured into the holiday genre with Hallmark Channel's Holiday Road in 2023 and the limited series Holidazed filmed in 2022.

== Filmography ==
=== Feature films ===
==== 1990s ====
Year	Title	Director	Distributor	Notes
1998	Urban Legend	Jamie Blanks	Sony Pictures Releasing	co-production with TriStar Pictures, Phoenix Pictures and Original Film

==== 2000s ====
Year	Title	Director	Distributor	Notes
2000	What Women Want	Nancy Meyers	Paramount Pictures	co-production with Icon Productions and Wind Dancer Films
2000	Urban Legends: Final Cut	John Ottman	Sony Pictures Releasing	co-production with Columbia Pictures, Phoenix Pictures and Original Film
2004	13 Going on 30	Gary Winick	Sony Pictures Releasing	co-production with Columbia Pictures, Roth/Arnold Productions and Revolution Studios

==== 2010s ====
Year	Title	Director	Distributor	Notes
2019	Isn't It Romantic	Todd Strauss-Schulson	Warner Bros. Pictures	co-production with New Line Cinema, Bron Creative, Netflix, Camp Sugar and Broken Road Productions

==== 2020s ====
Year	Title	Director	Distributor	Notes
2026	Reminders of Him	Vanessa Caswill	Universal Pictures	co-production with Heartbones Entertainment
2027	Twilight of the Dead	Doron Paz and Yoav Paz	Magenta Light Studios	co-production with SSS Entertainment and Aanaxion

=== Television movies/pilots ===
==== 1990s ====
Year	Title	Director	Network	Notes
1999	Summer's End	Helen Shaver	Showtime	co-production with Temple Street Productions and Hallmark Entertainment
1999	The Wishing Tree	Ivan Passer	Showtime	co-production with Dufferin Gate Productions and Hallmark Entertainment

==== 2000s ====
Year	Title	Director	Network	Notes
2003	Fubar	N/A	FX	co-production with Viacom Productions
2008	The Oaks	Michael Cuesta	Fox	co-production with 20th Century Fox Television
2008	Blue Blood	Brett Ratner	NBC	co-production with 20th Century Fox Television

==== 2020s ====
Year	Title	Director	Network	Notes
2023	Holiday Road	Martin Wood	Hallmark Channel	co-production with Timeless Pictures

=== Television series ===
==== 1990s ====
Years	Title	Creators	Network	Notes
1999–2001	Popular	Ryan Murphy; Gina Matthews	The WB	co-production with Ryan Murphy Productions, The Shepherd/Robin Company and Touchstone Television

==== 2000s ====
Years	Title	Creator	Network	Notes
2001–2002	The Chronicle	Silvio Horta	Sci-Fi Channel	co-production with The Greenblatt/Janollari Studio, Stu Segall Productions, Silent H Productions and 20th Century Fox International Television
2003–2004	Jake 2.0	Silvio Horta	UPN	co-production with David Greenwalt Productions, Silent H Productions and Viacom Productions
2004–2005	The Mountain	David Barrett; Gina Matthews; Grant Scharbo	The WB	uncredited; co-production with Shaun Cassidy Productions, Wonderland Sound and Vision and Warner Bros. Television

==== 2010s ====
Years	Title	Creator	Network	Notes
2010	The Gates	Richard Hatem; Grant Scharbo	ABC	co-production with Summerland Entertainment and Fox Television Studios
2012	Missing	Gregory Poirier	ABC	co-production with Upcountry Productions and ABC Studios
2014	Rush	Jonathan Levine	USA Network	co-production with Fancy Films, Pine City Entertainment and Fox 21
2015	Saints & Strangers	Seth Fisher	National Geographic Channel	miniseries; co-production with Sony Pictures Television
