= Gina Matthews =

American film producer and writer (born 1968)

- Born: San Francisco, California, U.S.
- Education: University of Oregon
- Occupations: Film and television producer
- Years active: 1998–present
- Spouse: Grant Scharbo

Gina Matthews is an American film and television producer and writer, whose credits include the horror film Urban Legend, What Women Want, 13 Going on 30, and Isn't It Romantic.

== Biography ==
Matthews was born in San Francisco and raised in Eugene, Oregon. Her mother, Yolanda, was an Italian immigrant, originally from Naples, and her father worked as a butcher. Matthews graduated from North Eugene High School in 1986 before earning a degree from the University of Oregon in 1990.

== Career ==
After relocating to Los Angeles, Matthews produced her first film, the cult slasher film Urban Legend (1998), which she developed with writer Silvio Horta. For 1999's Summer's End, Matthews won an Emmy Award for Outstanding Children's Special, shared with co-producers Frank Siracusa, Connie Tavel, and Patrick Whitely.

In 2003, Matthews produced the unaired pilot for FX titled Fubar, concerning military recruits at the U.S.-Mexico border. The following year, she produced the romantic comedy 13 Going on 30 (2004), starring Jennifer Garner. In 2008, she produced the television pilot The Oaks, and the television film Blue Blood, directed by Brett Ratner. In 2019, Matthews produced the comedy film Isn't It Romantic, starring Rebel Wilson.

She is the founder, alongside her husband, producer Grant Scharbo, of Little Engine Productions.

== Filmography ==
=== Producer ===
Year	Title	Notes	Ref.
1998	Urban Legend	Producer	
1999	Summer's End	Executive producer Emmy Award for Outstanding Children's Special	
1999	The Wishing Tree	Producer	
2000	Urban Legends: Final Cut	Producer	
2000	What Women Want	Producer	
2001	The Chronicle	Producer	
2003	Fubar	Producer; unaired pilot	
2004	13 Going on 30	Producer	
2004	The Mountain	Television series; executive producer	
2004	Jake 2.0	Television series; executive producer	
2008	The Oaks	Television pilot; executive producer	
2008	Blue Blood	Executive producer	
2010	The Gates	Television series; executive producer	
2012	Missing	Television series; executive producer	
2014	Rush	Television series; executive producer	
2015	Saints & Strangers	Miniseries	
2019	Isn't It Romantic	Producer	
2026	Reminders of Him	Producer	

=== Writer ===
Year	Title	Notes	Ref.
1999–2001	Popular	Television series; also co-creator	
2003	Jake 2.0	Episode: "Last Man Standing"	
2004–2005	The Mountain	Television series; also co-creator	
