= Unlikely Angel =

American made-for-TV Movie

- Genre: Comedy; Fantasy
- Written by: Liz Coe; Robert L. Freedman
- Story by: Katherine Ann Jones
- Directed by: Michael Switzer
- Starring: Dolly Parton; Brian Kerwin; Maria Del Mar; Allison Mack; Gary Sandy; Roddy McDowall
- Music by: Velton Ray Bunch
- Country of origin: United States
- Original language: English

Production
- Executive producers: Peter Locke; Donald Kushner
- Producer: Jonathan Bernstein
- Cinematography: Robert Draper
- Editor: Mark W. Rosenbaum
- Running time: 95 minutes
- Production companies: Sandollar Productions; The Kushner-Locke Company
- Budget: $4,000,000 (estimated)

Original release
- Network: CBS
- Release: December 17, 1996

Unlikely Angel is a 1996 American made-for-television Christmas fantasy-comedy film directed by Michael Switzer and starring Dolly Parton. It was based on the never-aired TV series "Heavens to Betsy", also starring Parton, and premiered on CBS on December 17, 1996.

== Plot ==
While driving home from a bar one night, straight-talking singer Ruby Diamond crashes her car and dies. In heaven, she meets Saint Peter who reveals she can return to Earth, but only to reunite an estranged suburban family who have been torn apart since the mother died. If she succeeds by midnight on Christmas Eve, she will be granted her wings as an angel.

Ruby arrives at the Bartilson house, masquerading as a housekeeper and a nanny for rebellious teenager Sarah and her younger brother Matthew, both of whom have trouble bonding with their distracted father Ben and spend most of their time alone in their bedrooms. The three are initially cold towards Ruby, but as time goes by, she slowly manages to bring the family back together.

Ruby develops feelings for Ben, much to Saint Peter's dismay who tells her a romantic relationship is against the rules of the deal. As Christmas Eve comes around, Matthew runs away from home, and Saint Peter appears to remind Ruby she must reunite them all by midnight. Ruby replies, "I don't care; I'm fixing this family whether I get into Heaven or not." Upon the successful completion of her mission, Saint Peter urges her to leave. As she has become very close with the family, she protests, but Saint Peter reminds her they will no longer remember.

As Ruby is finally awarded her wings, we see the Bartilson family celebrating their first Christmas together in years.

== Cast ==
- Dolly Parton as Ruby Diamond
- Brian Kerwin as Ben Bartilson
- Maria Del Mar as Allison
- Allison Mack as Sarah Bartilson
- Eli Marienthal as Matthew Bartilson
- Gary Sandy as Charlie
- Roddy McDowall as Saint Peter

== See also ==
- List of Christmas films
- List of films about angels
