= David Barrett (director) =

American television director and producer

David McCoy Barrett
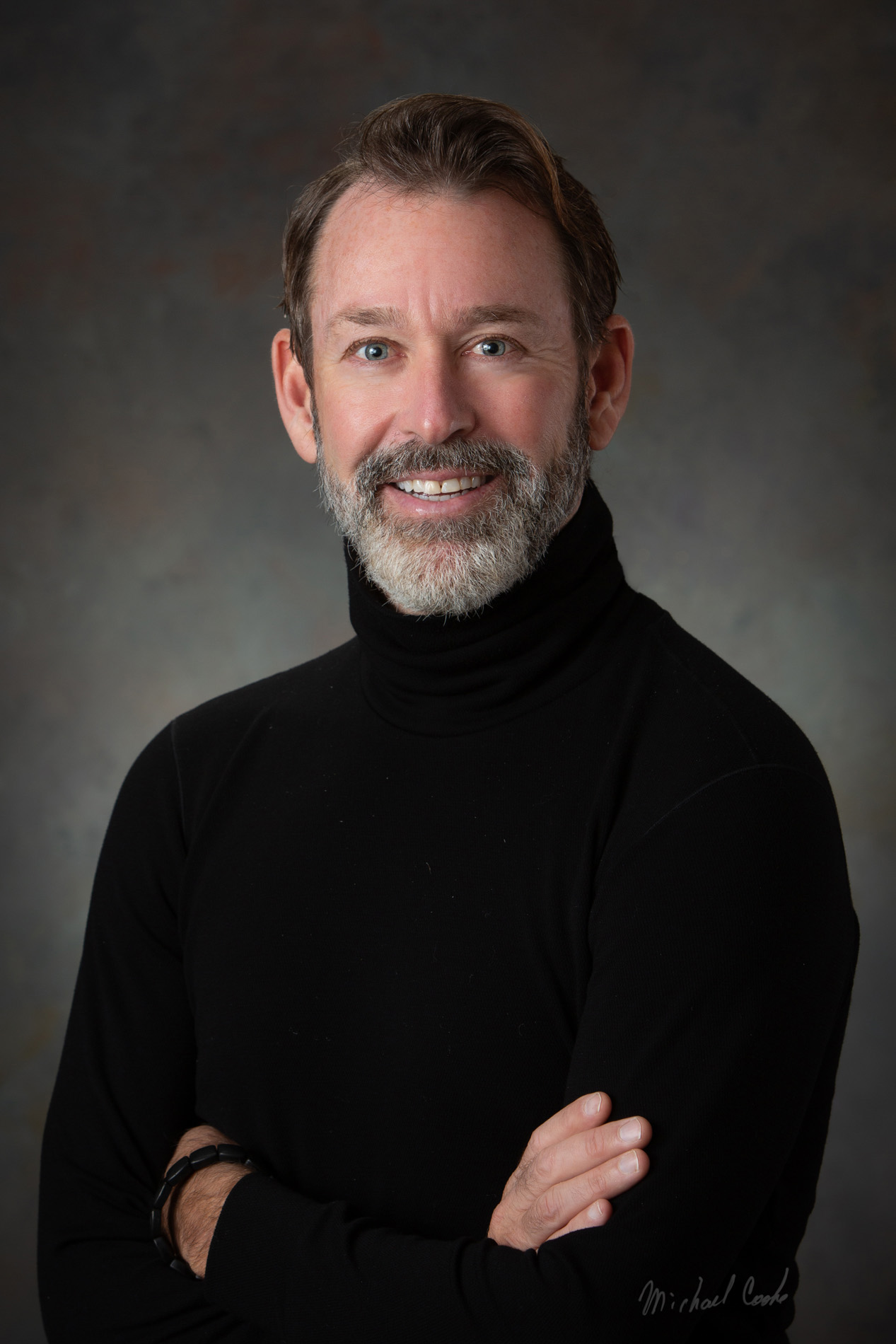
- Born: Bishop, California, U.S.
- Occupations: Television director, film director, producer
- Years active: 1996–present
- Parent: Stan Barrett (father)

David McCoy Barrett is an American television director and producer.

== Career ==
Barrett began his career as a stuntman and transitioned to being stunt coordinator, second unit director, and eventually show creator. He co-created the CW television series The Mountain (2004), a patriarchal family drama loosely based on his upbringing as a struggling motocross racer at Mammoth Mountain.

In 2012, he directed his first feature film Fire With Fire, starring Josh Duhamel, Rosario Dawson, Bruce Willis, and Vincent D'Onofrio.

== Personal life ==
Barrett grew up in Bishop, California. His father, Stan Barrett, was Burt Reynolds’ and Paul Newman’s stunt double. Stan Barrett also raced in 19 Winston Cup series races between 1980 and 1990, and exceeded the speed of sound in 1979. His mother, Penny McCoy, is a former World Cup alpine ski racer. His brother, Stanton Barrett is a NASCAR driver and Hollywood stuntman.

Barrett is the grandson of Dave McCoy, who is the founder of Mammoth Mountain Ski Area. His godfather is Paul Newman.

== Filmography ==
=== Director ===
- Tracker (TV series, 2024) (4 episodes, 2025-2026)
- FBI: Most Wanted (TV series, 2024) (1 episode, 2024)
- True Lies (TV series, 2023) (1 episode, 2023)
- La Brea (TV series 2022) (2 episodes, 2022–2024)
- FBI: International (TV series 2021) (1 episode, 2022)
- Star Trek: Discovery (TV series 2017) (2 episodes, 2017–2019)
- Under the Dome (TV series 2013) (4 episodes, 2013–2015)
- Blue Bloods (TV series 2010) (10 episodes, 2012–2014)
- The Mentalist (TV series 2008) (7 episodes, 2008–2013)
- Once Upon a Time (TV series 2011) (3 episodes, 2011–2013)
- Supah Ninjas (TV series 2011) (2 episodes, 2011–2013)
- Castle (TV series 2009) (5 episodes, 2010–2012)
- Arrow (TV series 2012) (2 episodes, 2012–2013)
- Fire with Fire (Video 2012)
- The Secret Circle (TV series 2011) (3 episodes, 2011–2012)
- V (TV series 2009) (3 episodes, 2010–2011)
- Supernatural (TV series 2005) (1 episode, 2011)
- Human Target (TV series 2010) (1 episode, 2011)
- Nikita (TV series 2010) (1 episode, 2010)
- The Gates (TV series 2010) (2 episodes, 2010)
- NCIS: Los Angeles (TV series 2009) (3 episodes, 2009–2010)
- The Vampire Diaries (TV series 2009) (1 episode, 2010)
- Melrose Place (TV series 2009) (1 episode, 2009)
- The Cleaner (TV series 2008) (2 episodes, 2009)
- Life on Mars (TV series 2008) (1 episode, 2009)
- CSI: NY (TV series 2004) (1 episode, 2009)
- Crash (TV series 2008) (1 episode, 2008)
- Eleventh Hour (TV series 2008) (1 episode, 2008)
- Moonlight (TV series 2007) (1 episode, 2008)
- 2007 Taurus World Stunt Awards (TV special 2007) (opening sequence)
- Cold Case (TV series 2003) (6 episodes, 2004–2007)
- E-Ring (TV series 2005) (4 episodes, 2005–2006)
- Smallville (TV series 2001) (2 episodes, 2004–2005)
- Star Trek: Enterprise (TV series 2001) (1 episode, 2005)
- Veronica Mars (TV series 2004) (1 episode, 2005)
- The Mountain (TV series 2004) (1 episode, 2004)
- Hawaii (TV series 2004) (unknown episodes)
- The O.C. (TV series 2003) (1 episode, 2004)
- Without a Trace (TV series 2002) (1 episode, 2004)
- Tru Calling (TV series 2003) (1 episode, 2003)
- Jake 2.0 (TV series 2003) (3 episodes, 2003)
- Fastlane (TV series 2002) (2 episodes, 2003)
- The Chronicle (TV series 2001) (1 episode, 2002)
- FreakyLinks (TV series 2000) (1 episode, 2001)
- Pacific Blue (TV series 1996) (1 episode, 2000)
- Mission Extreme (TV series 2000)

=== Producer ===
- "Blue Bloods" (TV series 2013) (co-executive producer) (22 episodes, 2014)
- "The Secret Circle" (TV series 2011) (co-executive producer) (9 episodes, 2012)
- "Orphan" (2009)
- "Moonlight" (TV series 2007) (executive producer) (11 episodes, 2007–2008)
- "Cold Case" (TV series 2003) (supervising producer) (24 episodes, 2006–2007)
- "E-Ring" (TV series 2005) (producer) (23 episodes, 2005–2006)
- "The Mountain" (TV series 2004) (executive producer) (13 episodes, 2004–2005)
- "Peak Experience" (2003)

=== Second Unit Director ===
- "Orphan" (2009)
- "Bionic Woman" (TV series 2007) (second unit director) (Episode: "Paradise Lost", 2007)
- "Cold Case" (TV series 2003) (second unit director) (5 episodes, 2006–2007)
- "E-Ring" (TV series 2005) (second unit director) (5 episodes, 2005–2006)
- "The Fog" (2005) (as David M. Barrett)
- "Supercross" (2005)
- "Matando Cabos" (2004)
- "Final Destination 2" (2003)
- "Fastlane" (TV series 2002) (second unit director) (22 episodes, 2002–2003)
- "Deuces Wild" (2002)
- "Motocrossed" (2001)
- "FreakyLinks" (TV series 2000) (second unit director) (Episode: "Subject: The Stone Room", 2001)
- "Ball & Chain" (2001)
- "Gilmore Girls" (TV series 2000) (second unit director) (unknown episodes)
- "Stigmata" (1999)
- "Pacific Blue" (TV series 1996) (second unit director) (13 episodes, 1999–2000)

=== Stunts ===
- "The Double" (2011)
- "The Town" (2010)
- "The Taking of Pelham 1 2 3" (2009)
- "Miss March" (2009)
- "Race to Witch Mountain" (2009)
- "Moonlight" (TV series 2007) (stunts) (Episode: "Love Lasts Forever", 2008)
- "Once Upon a Time in Mexico" (2003)
- "The Matrix Reloaded" (2003) (uncredited)
- "Fastlane" (TV series 2002) (stunt coordinator) (18 episodes, 2002–2003)
- "Gods and Generals" (2003)
- "8 Mile" (2002)
- "Windtalkers" (2002)
- "Spider-Man" (2002) (uncredited)
- "Dragonfly" (2002)
- "Crossing Jordan" (TV series 2001) (stunt coordinator) (Episode "Pilot", 2001)
- "Don't Say a Word" (2001)
- "The Agency" (TV series 2001) (stunt coordinator) (unknown episodes)
- "Dead Last" (TV series 2001) (stunt coordinator) (unknown episodes)
- "Lizzie McGuire" (TV series 2001) (stunt coordinator) (2 episodes, 2001)
- "Jurassic Park III" (2001)
- "FreakyLinks" (TV series 2000) (stunt coordinator) (11 episodes, 2000–2001)
- "Motocrossed" (2001) (as David M. Barrett)
- "Soarin'" (Short 2001)
- "Ball & Chain" (2001)
- "Submerged" (2000) (as David M. Barrett)
- "Shriek If You Know What I Did Last Friday the Thirteenth" (Video 2000)
- "Dancing at the Blue Iguana" (2000) (as David M. Barrett)
- "Stigmata" (1999)
- "Deep Blue Sea" (1999) (as David McCoy Barrett)
- "Johnny Tsunami" (1999)
- "Mystery Men" (1999)
- "Idle Hands" (1999)
- "The Mod Squad" (1999) (uncredited)
- "Splendor" (1999)
- "A Civil Action" (1998)
- "Like Father, Like Santa" (1998) (uncredited)
- "The Famous Jett Jackson" (TV series 1998) (stunt coordinator) (unknown episodes) (stunt pilot) (unknown episodes, 1998–2001)
- "Finding Graceland" (1998)
- "Species II" (1998) (as David M. Barrett)
- "Hush" (1998) (as Dave Barrett)
- "Martian Law" (1998)
- "Money Talks" (1997)
- "Speed 2: Cruise Control" (1997)
- "The Lost World: Jurassic Park" (1997)
- "Truth or Consequences, N.M." (1997)
- "Volcano" (1997)
- "Grosse Pointe Blank" (1997) (uncredited)
- "Liar Liar" (1997)
- "Dante's Peak" (1997)
- "Lost Highway" (1997)
- "Invasion of Privacy" (1996)
- "Pure Danger" (Video 1996)
- "A Time to Kill" (1996) (uncredited)
- "Fled" (1996)
- "Pacific Blue" (TV series 1996) (stunt coordinator) (20 episodes, 1999–2000)
- "Uncle Sam" (Video 1996)
- "Raging Angels" (1995)
- "Waterworld" (1995)
- "Children of the Corn III: Urban Harvest" (1995)
- "The Soft Kill" (1994)
- "Rebel Highway" (TV series 1994) (stunts) (2 episodes, 1994)
- "Dragstrip Girl" (1994)
- "Roadracers" (1994)
- "Ghost in the Machine" (1993) (as David M. Barrett)
- "Striking Distance" (1993)
- "Aspen Extreme" (1993)
- "Rescue 911" (TV series 1989) (stunt coordinator) (unknown episodes) (stunts) (unknown episodes, 1989–1996)

=== Writer ===
- "The Mountain" (TV series 2004) (10 episodes, 2004–2005)
