= Catherine Ann Jones =

American writer

Catherine Ann Jones (Katherine Rao) is an American dramatist and playwright as well as an actor and short story writer.

== Awards ==
Jones's 2013 book, Heal Your Self with Writing, won the Nautilus Book Award in 2014.

== Personal life ==
When Jones was 19 she met Indian writer and novelist Raja Rao who was lecturing on Indian philosophy at the University of Texas, Austin. They were married in Paris in 1965 and had one son. The twenty-year marriage ended in divorce in 1986.

== Works ==
=== Books ===
- The Way of Story the Craft and Soul of Writing. Prasana Press. 2000. ISBN 978-0-9765352-0-1.
- Heal Your Self with Writing. Divine Arts. 2013. ISBN 978-1-61125-016-9.
- Freud's Oracle: A Play Based on the Life of H. D. Prasana Press. 2016. ISBN 978-0-9765352-1-8.
- Buddha and the Dancing Girl: A Creative Life. Prasana Press. 2020. ISBN 978-0-9765352-4-9.
- True Fables: Stories from Childhood. Prasana Press. 2020. ISBN 978-0-9765352-3-2.
- East & West: Stories of India. Pippa Rann Books & Media. 2024. ISBN 978-1-913738-88-4.

=== Television ===
- 1976: Great Performances: "The Patriots" [S3.E28] – actress: Patsy Jefferson).
- 1988: The Christmas Wife (TV film) – writer and producer.
- 1996: Touched by an Angel: "A Joyful Noise" [S3.E2] – writer.
- 1996: Unlikely Angel (TV film) – writer.

=== Plays ===
- Freud’s Oracle
- Calamity Jane
- Calamity Jane the Musical (Best Production 2015)
- The Women of Cedar Creek (NY Drama League Award, Beverly Hills Th. Guild Award)
- The Myth of Annie Beckman
- On the Edge: The Final Years of Virginia Woolf (NEA Award)
- Somewhere-in-Between
- Difficult Friends
- The Hill
- The Friend
- A Fairytale for Adults
- Always a Tomorrow
