= Switching Goals =

- DVD cover
- Written by: David Kukoff; Matt Roshkow
- Directed by: David Steinberg
- Starring: Mary-Kate and Ashley Olsen
- Music by: Patrick Williams
- Country of origin: United States
- Original language: English

Production
- Executive producers: Mary-Kate Olsen; Ashley Olsen
- Producers: Ilana Kukoff; Susan Murdoch
- Cinematography: David A. Makin
- Editor: Bud Friedgen
- Running time: 85 minutes
- Production companies: Dualstar Productions; Warner Bros. Television

Original release
- Network: ABC
- Release: December 12, 1999

Switching Goals is a 1999 American sports comedy television film directed by David Steinberg and starring Mary-Kate and Ashley Olsen. The film was produced by Dualstar Productions and Warner Bros. Television and premiered on December 12, 1999, on ABC as part of The Wonderful World of Disney. The Olsen twins play identical twins who are polar opposites.

== Production ==
The teenage Olsen twins trained with the United States women's national soccer team to prepare for the film.

== Plot ==
Thirteen-year-old twin sisters Sam and Emma Stanton are opposites growing up in Evansville, Indiana. Sam is a star soccer player and a tomboy; however, she wants to attract boys. Emma is a popular girly girl who enjoys fashion and make-up, but she wants to be better at sports. Their dad Jerry, a soccer coach, is pressured by his wife Denise to pick Emma for the Hurricanes co-ed team. Just as Jerry is about to pick Sam for his team after Round 2 of soccer tryouts is over, Buzzards coach Willard Holmes picks Sam. Sam is not thrilled to join a team that hasn't won in years and Emma finds it difficult to please her dad, so the girls come up with a scheme to switch places so each can be on the team they prefer. As a result, Sam learns about letting others share the spotlight and Emma and Jerry finally become closer. Their mom catches them and the girls have to go back to their original teams. When everyone else is mad at them, Sam and Emma decide to quit soccer, but Jerry refuses to let them give up the sport. Denise becomes the Buzzards new coach to prove her husband wrong and gets the team into the finals. Along the way, Emma realizes her skill as a goalie and becomes a better athlete. At the finals, the Hurricanes regular goalie Richie is injured while blocking a kick and is replaced by Emma. With 20 seconds left, Sam kicks the ball into the goal, and it is blocked by Emma, tying the game. The Buzzards and the Hurricanes become co-champions of the Youth soccer league organization tournament. Sam gets a date with Greg. Richie goes on a date with Emma. Jerry learns to treat his daughters equally and that winning isn't everything.

== Cast ==
- Ashley Olsen as Emma Stanton
- Mary-Kate Olsen as Samantha Stanton
- Kathryn Greenwood as Dr. Denise Stanton
- Eric Lutes as Coach Jerry Stanton
- Joe Grifasi as Dave
- Trevor Blumas as Greg Jeffries
- Keith Knight as Coach Willard Holmes
- Jake LeDoux as Richie
- Calvin Rosemond as Frankie
- Michael Cera as Taylor
- Robert Clark as Robert "Helmet Head"
- Brian Heighton as Jim
- Ted Atherton as Mitch
- Vito Rezza as Sal
- Damir Andrei as Arden
- Michael Lamport as Adrian
- Jesse Farb as Oscar
- Marcello Melecca as Danny
- Judah Katz as Mike
- Joseph Yawson as Sean Mark
- Moynan King as Taylor's mom
- Joanna Reece as Bobby's mom
- Wendy Haller as Teacher
- Adrian Griffin as Referee
- Alex House as Kid at arcade
- Alexi Lalas as Himself

== See also ==
- Just for Kicks
- List of association football films
