= Vincent Gardenia =

American actor (1920–1992)

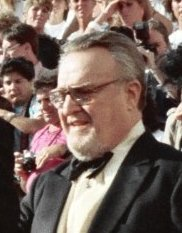
- Gardenia at the 1988 Academy Awards
- Born: Vincenzo Scognamiglio; January 7, 1920 (Note: Other dates of birth attributed to Gardenia include January 7, 1921 [military records, travel manifest giving age of 22 months upon arrival in USA in November 1922], November 30, 1921 [Social Security records], and January 7, 1922—although his gravestone gives the year 1920 but with no date of birth); Ercolano, Kingdom of Italy
- Died: December 9, 1992 (aged 72); Philadelphia, Pennsylvania, U.S.
- Occupation: Actor
- Years active: 1945–1992

Vincent Gardenia (born Vincenzo Scognamiglio; January 7, 1920 – December 9, 1992) was an Italian American stage, film, and television actor. He was nominated twice for the Academy Award for Best Supporting Actor, first for Bang the Drum Slowly (1973) and again for Moonstruck (1987). He also portrayed Det. Frank Ochoa in Death Wish (1974) and its 1982 sequel, Death Wish II, and played Mr. Mushnik in the musical film adaptation Little Shop of Horrors (1986). His other notable feature films include Murder Inc. (1960), The Hustler (1961), The Front Page (1974), Greased Lightning (1977), Heaven Can Wait (1978), and The Super (1991).

In 1990, Gardenia was awarded the Emmy Award for Best Supporting Actor in a television movie or television series for the HBO production Age-Old Friends. He was twice honored for his performances on Broadway. In 1972, he won the Tony Award for Best Supporting Actor in The Prisoner of Second Avenue and was nominated for Best Actor in a Musical in 1979 for Ballroom. Off Broadway, he was twice awarded the Obie Award for Most Distinguished Performance Award by an Actor: in 1960 for Machinal and again in 1969 for Passing Through From Exotic Places.

== Early life ==
Gardenia was born Vincenzo Scognamiglio in Ercolano, Città Metropolitana di Napoli, Campania, Italy, to Elisa (née Ausiello) and Gennaro Scognamiglio.

In November 1922, the family immigrated to the United States and settled in Brooklyn, New York. Both Gardenia's younger brother, Ralph Scognamiglio (1925–2018), and younger sister, Concetta (later, Mrs. Gogliormella; 1924–1989), were born in New York. Gennaro Scognamiglio established an acting troupe that presented Italian-language melodramas. As a child, he performed in the troupe in Italian-American neighborhoods in and around New York, having later said, "The titles changed, but they were usually about a son or daughter who gets in trouble, runs away, then begs forgiveness". He debuted in the company at age five, portraying a shoeshine boy. He graduated to character roles while still a teenager. He remained a member of the company until 1960, five years after his first English-speaking role on Broadway.

Gardenia also served in the U.S. Army during World War II.

== Career ==
Gardenia played a small role in the film The House on 92nd Street and bit parts in other films, including Cop Hater and A View From the Bridge. His first English-speaking role was in 1955, as a pirate in the Broadway play In April Once. The following year, at age 36, he appeared as Piggy in his off-Broadway debut in The Man with the Golden Arm. He described his role in the film Little Murders as a "turning point". He won Obie Awards in 1960 and 1969.

A life member of The Actors Studio, Gardenia won a Tony Award for Best Featured Actor in a Play in 1972 for his performance in The Prisoner of Second Avenue, opposite Peter Falk. In 1979, he was nominated for Best Actor in a Musical for his performance in Ballroom.

In film, he was twice nominated for an Academy Award for Best Supporting Actor for his performances in Bang the Drum Slowly and Moonstruck.

In television, Gardenia won the 1990 Emmy Award for his performance in Age-Old Friends, with Hume Cronyn. Among his best-remembered TV roles is his portrayal of Archie Bunker's neighbor Frank Lorenzo in All in the Family as well as in earlier episodes as neighbor Jim Bowman and later as a part of a swinger couple and of J. Edgar Hoover in the miniseries Kennedy (1983). He was featured in an episode of Voyage to the Bottom of the Sea titled "Escape From Venice". In addition, Gardenia gave memorable performances in such popular TV shows as The Twilight Zone, Mission: Impossible, Mannix, Ironside, The Big Valley, and The Fugitive.

In 1975, Gardenia appeared in season 3, episode 13, of Kojak, "A House of Prayer, a Den of Thieves", in which he portrayed Vince LaGuardia, a former New York police detective and close friend and colleague of Lt. Kojak's but now living and working in Las Vegas. The characters and storyline were tests of audience response, with the goal of selling this as a pilot for a new series starring Gardenia. The pilot was not picked up by CBS.

== Death ==
In December 1992, Gardenia was in Philadelphia to perform in a stage production of the Tom Dulack comedy Breaking Legs. He was beginning a three-week run as restaurant owner Lou Graziano in the Off Broadway hit at the Forrest Theatre. It was a role he had performed since the show's New York opening in May 1991. Around 1 a.m. on December 9, 1992, hours after the final preview performance, Gardenia returned to his hotel room after dining with stage director John Tillinger, producer Elliot Martin, and cast members. According to Martin, Gardenia showed no signs of illness, adding, "It was just a jolly evening." According to authorities, when Gardenia failed to appear the next morning for a radio interview to promote the play's run, press representative Irene Gandy and cast member Vince Viverito became alarmed. When they arrived at Gardenia's hotel room, there was no answer. The hotel sent an engineer, who opened the door, and Gardenia was discovered dead of a heart attack, dressed and clutching the telephone.

That evening, in the theatrical tradition of "the show must go on" and just hours after Gardenia's death, the play's official opening took place. The company dedicated its opening performance to Gardenia's memory. Harry Guardino assumed Gardenia's role as the restaurant owner.

Gardenia never married or had children. He was survived by his younger brother, Ralph Frank Scognamiglio (September 30, 1925 – January 31, 2018). A section of 16th Avenue in the Bensonhurst neighborhood of Brooklyn, where he resided until his death, bears the honorary name of Vincent Gardenia Boulevard in his memory.

== Filmography ==
Year	Title	Role	Notes
1945	The House on 92nd Street	German spy trainee	Uncredited
1958	Cop Hater	Danny Gimp	
1960	Murder, Inc.	Lawyer Laslo	
1961	Parrish	Bit part	Uncredited
1961	Mad Dog Coll	Dutch Schultz	
1961	The Hustler	Bartender	
1962	A View from the Bridge	Liperi	
1965	The Third Day	Preston	
1970	Jenny	Mr. Marsh	
1970	Where's Poppa?	Coach Williams	
1971	Little Murders	Carol Newquist	
1971	Cold Turkey	Mayor Quincey L. Wappler	
1972	Hickey & Boggs	Papadakis	
1973	Bang the Drum Slowly	Dutch Schnell	Nominated—Academy Award for Best Supporting Actor
1973	Lucky Luciano	Colonel Charles Poletti	
1974	Death Wish	Det. Frank Ochoa	
1974	The Front Page	Sheriff Pete Hartmann	
1975	The Manchu Eagle Murder Caper Mystery	Big Daddy Jessup	
1975	La banca di Monate	Santino Paleari	
1976	House of Pleasure for Women	Mr. Chips	
1976	The Big Racket	Pepe	
1976	Luna di miele in tre	Frankie, the journalist	
1977	Fire Sale	Benny Fikus	
1977	Greased Lightning	Sheriff Cotton	
1978	Heaven Can Wait	Det. Lt. Krim	
1979	Firepower	Frank Hull	
1979	Home Movies	Doctor Byrd	
1979	Sensitività	Old painter	
1979	Goldie and the Boxer	Diamond	
1979	That's Life		
1980	The Dream Merchants	Peter Kessler	
1980	The Last Flight of Noah's Ark	Stoney	
1982	Death Wish II	Det. Frank Ochoa	
1983	Odd Squad	General Brigg	
1985	Movers & Shakers	Saul Gritz	
1986	Little Shop of Horrors	Mr. Mushnik	
1987	Moonstruck	Cosmo Castorini	Nominated—Academy Award for Best Supporting Actor
1988	Cheeeese	Bonjour	
1988	Cavalli si nasce	Il Principe	
1989	Skin Deep	Barny the Barkeeper	
1991	The Super	Big Lou Kritski	(final film role)

== Television ==
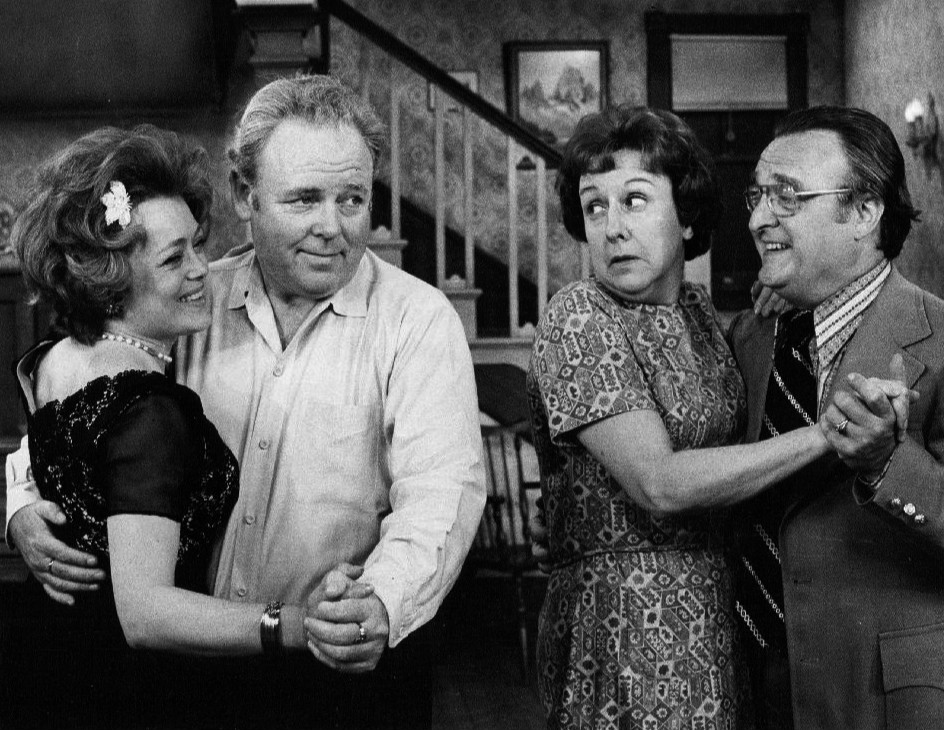
Before becoming a regular cast member on All in the Family, Gardenia and Rue McClanahan played "wife-swappers" who meet the unsuspecting Bunkers in a 1972 episode. L–R: McClanahan, Carroll O'Connor, Jean Stapleton and Gardenia

Some of Gardenia's many television appearances include:

Year	Film	Role	Notes
1954	Studio One	Bailiff (uncredited)	Season 7, episode 1: "Twelve Angry Men"
1955		1st mover	Season 8, episode 2: "Three Empty Rooms"
1957		Dick	Season 10, episode 1: "The Night America Trembled"
1958	Decoy	Bull	Season1, episode 19 ("The Challenger")
1961	The Untouchables	Jake Petrie	Season 3, episode 1 ("The Troubleshooter")
1965	The Big Valley	John Sample	Season 1, episode 1 ("Palms of Glory")
1965	Voyage to the Bottom of the Sea	Bellini	Season 2, episode 5 ("Escape from Venice")
1967	The Fugitive	Capt. Bill Gibbs	Season 4, episode 20 ("There Goes the Ball Game")
1967	Mannix	Eddie Cortina	Season 1, episode 2 ("Skid Marks on a Dry Run")
1967	I Spy	Dr. Mellado	Season 2, episode 23 ("Get Thee to a Nunnery")
1967	The Big Valley	Briggs	Season 2, episode 17 ("Image of Yesterday")
1967	The Rat Patrol	Colonel Centis	Season 1, episode 27 ("Take Me to Your Leader Raid")
1967	The Monkees	Bruno	Season 1 episode 17 ("The Case of the Missing Monkee")
1967	Gunsmoke	Charles Shepherd	Season 12, episode 24 ("Noose of Gold")
1967	Mission: Impossible	Vito Lugana	Season 2, episodes 11 & 12 ("The Council")
1968	Mission: Impossible	Lou Parma	Season 3, episode 5 ("The Execution")
1968	Ironside	Roy Faber	Season 1, episode 22 ("Something for Nothing")
1971	McCloud	Barney Sweetwater	Season 2, episode 2 ("Top of the World, Ma!")
1972	The Rookies	Saul	Season 1, episode 8 ("Dirge for Sunday")
1972	Love American Style	Mr. Cooperman	Season 4, episode 4 ("Love and the Girlish Groom")
1972	Maude	Judge Motorman	Season 1, episode 6 ("The Ticket")
1973–74	All in the Family	Frank Lorenzo	Before being cast regularly as Frank Lorenzo in season 4, Gardenia had played neighbor Jim Bowman in a single episode of season 1 and swinger Curtis Rempley in a single episode of season 3.
1975	Kojak	Vince LaGuardia	Season 3, episode 13 ("A House of Prayer, a Den of Thieves")
1977	The Mary Tyler Moore Show	Frank Coleman	Season 7, episode 24 ("The Last Show")
1980–81	Breaking Away	Ray Stoller	Starring role (all 8 episodes)
1982	Muggable Mary, Street Cop	Maggio	Television film
1983	Charley's Aunt	Stephen Spettigue	Television film
1983	Kennedy	J. Edgar Hoover	Television miniseries
1984	Dark Mirror	Detective Al Church	Television film
1985	Brass	Chief Mike Maldonato	Television film
1985	The Twilight Zone	Harry Faulk	Season 1, episode 3 ("Healer")
1989	Age-Old Friends	Michael Aylott	Television film; Winner—Primetime Emmy Award for Outstanding Supporting Actor in a Limited or Anthology Series or Movie
1990	The Ray Bradbury Theatre	Mr. Terle	Season 4, Episode 10 ("The Day It Rained Forever")
1990	The Tragedy of Flight 103: The Inside Story	Harry Pizer	Television film
1990	L.A. Law	Murray Melman	7 episodes
