= Rush (American TV series) =

2014 American medical drama television series

- Genre: Medical drama
- Created by: Jonathan Levine
- Written by: Jonathan Levine; Gina Matthews; Grant Scharbo
- Starring: Tom Ellis; Larenz Tate; Sarah Habel; Rick Gonzalez
- Theme music composer: Robert Duncan
- Country of origin: United States
- Original language: English
- No. of seasons: 1
- No. of episodes: 10

Production
- Executive producers: Jonathan Levine; Gina Matthews; Grant Scharbo; Adam Fierro; Deran Sarafian; Craig Wright
- Producers: Shawn Williamson; Dan Clarke
- Cinematography: Jon Joffin; Ken Seng
- Editors: John Duffy; Steve Polivka; Joe Leonard; Sue Blainey; Alan Cody; J.Kathleen Gibson
- Running time: 43 minutes
- Production companies: Little Engine Productions; Fancy Films; Pine City Entertainment; Fox 21

Original release
- Network: USA Network
- Release: July 17 – September 18, 2014

Rush is an American medical drama series created by Jonathan Levine and written by Levine, Gina Matthews and Grant Scharbo. It premiered on USA Network on July 17, 2014. On October 2, 2014, USA Network cancelled Rush.

== Plot ==
The series is the story of a hard-partying Los Angeles doctor serving a very specific clientele, the kind with a lot of cash and a lot of secrets. After Dr. William Rush was dismissed from a major L.A. hospital, he entered "concierge" medicine, making personal visits to the homes and workplaces of wealthy clients and Hollywood celebrities who need his care, often with no questions asked. Rush demands payment in cash, often thousands of dollars, and in advance. But some of that money is used to feed his drug habit, and one of the characters in the show, Manny Maquis, is his drug supplier. Dr. Alex Burke is his best friend who, unlike Rush, is still practicing at a major hospital and trying to be a faithful husband and dad. Eve Parker is Rush's personal assistant who not only sets Rush's medical appointments with patients, but also tries to keep him on track, despite her knowledge of his drug and alcohol use.

== Cast ==
=== Main ===
- Tom Ellis as Dr. William P. Rush
- Larenz Tate as Dr. Alex Burke
- Sarah Habel as Eve Parker
- Rick Gonzalez as Manny Maquis

=== Recurring ===
- Odette Annable as Sarah Peterson
- Erica Cerra as Laurel Burke
- Rachel Nichols as Corrine Rush
- Harry Hamlin as Dr. Warren Rush
- Warren Christie as J.P.

== Production ==
This series came from Fox 21 and was written and directed by Jonathan Levine, with Gina Matthews and Gretta Scharbo. Adam Fierro was executive producer. Rush was filmed in Vancouver British Columbia, Canada.

== Critical reception ==
Rush scored 44 out of 100 on Metacritic based on 14 "mixed or average" reviews. The review aggregator website Rotten Tomatoes currently reports a 39% critics rating with an average rating of 4.1/10 based on 18 reviews. The website consensus reads: "A competent but bland medical drama, Rush fails to add anything new to an overly familiar concept".

== Episodes ==
No.	Title	Directed by	Written by	Original release date	Prod. code	U.S. viewers (millions)
1	"Pilot"	Jonathan Levine	Jonathan Levine	July 17, 2014	1WAW79	1.70
After losing his career as an ER doctor, a hard partying physician attends wealthy clients' medical emergencies.
2	"Don't Ask Me Why"	Deran Sarafian	Jonathan Levine & Craig Wright	July 24, 2014	1WAW01	1.64
Rush treats an MMA fighter with a career-jeopardizing condition while Alex tries to save his job and Manny and Eve discuss their roles in Rush's life.
3	"Learning to Fly"	Alex Zakrzewski	Adam E. Fierro	July 31, 2014	1WAW02	1.79
Rush contends with a medical emergency and reaches out to his estranged father while Eve must confront a figure from her past.
4	"We Are Family"	Bill Johnson	Matt Pyken	August 7, 2014	1WAW03	1.83
Rush deals with a private menagerie and his stepmother before being taken hostage by a young criminal; Eve finds a network of personal assistants.
5	"Where Is My Mind?"	David Barrett	Michael Rochford	August 14, 2014	1WAW04	1.55
Rush throws himself into his work to relieve his anxiety; Eve takes charge of an important case.
6	"You Spin Me Round"	David Straiton	Lisa Randolph	August 21, 2014	1WAW05	1.60
Rush and Alex plan a weekend together without realizing Rush's ex and her new boyfriend will also be in attendance. Elsewhere, Rush treats a poliltician on the campaign trail, and Eve tries to start fresh with Lucas.
7	"Because I Got High"	Paul Edwards	Jason George	August 28, 2014	1WAW06	1.49
A rock star introduces Rush to a powerful hallucinogen that changes his perspective entirely. Elsewhere, Alex gets a taste of Rush's lifestyle, and Eve becomes concerned when belongings disappear from her apartment.
8	"Get Lucky"	Elodie Keene	Kathryn Borel	September 4, 2014	1WAW07	1.43
When Rush reconnects with Sarah, he finds her changed; Alex may be in over his head.
9	"Dirty Work"	Allan Kroeker	Adam Fierro & Matt Pyken	September 11, 2014	1WAW08	1.87
Sarah's desire to find a sperm donor complicates things with Rush, while Alex tries to control the fallout with his wife. Elsewhere, Sarah encourages Eve to think about future possibilities, but J.P. devastates them when he resurfaces.
10	"Bitter Sweet Symphony"	Deran Sarafian	Adam Fierro & Matt Pyken	September 18, 2014	1WAW10	1.63
Rush struggles to make life changes for Sarah, but continues to be haunted by the ghost of his past. Eve deals with her last encounter with her ex, and Alex's mistakes come to a head when Steffi comes to him with a shocking proposal.
