= Reminders of Him =

2026 film by Vanessa Caswill

- Theatrical release poster
- Directed by: Vanessa Caswill
- Screenplay by: Colleen Hoover; Lauren Levine
- Based on: Reminders of Him by Colleen Hoover
- Produced by: Colleen Hoover; Lauren Levine; Gina Matthews
- Starring: Maika Monroe; Tyriq Withers; Rudy Pankow; Lainey Wilson; Lauren Graham; Bradley Whitford
- Cinematography: Tim Ives
- Edited by: Michelle Harrison
- Music by: Tom Howe
- Production companies: Heartbones Entertainment; Little Engine Productions
- Distributed by: Universal Pictures
- Release dates: March 9, 2026 (Los Angeles); March 13, 2026 (United States)
- Running time: 114 minutes
- Country: United States
- Language: English
- Budget: $25 million
- Box office: $89 million

Reminders of Him is a 2026 American romance film directed by Vanessa Caswill from a screenplay by Colleen Hoover and Lauren Levine, based on the 2022 novel by Hoover. It stars Maika Monroe, Tyriq Withers, Rudy Pankow, Lainey Wilson (in her film debut), Lauren Graham, and Bradley Whitford.

Paroled from prison six years after being convicted of vehicular manslaughter of her boyfriend Scotty, Kenna attempts to meet her young daughter born during her incarceration, but faces resistance from everyone except bar owner Ledger, who had been Scotty's best friend. They grow closer, working together to heal past wounds to be able to move forward.

Reminders of Him premiered at Los Angeles on March 9, 2026, and was released in the United States by Universal Pictures on March 13, 2026. The film received mixed reviews from critics and was a box office success, grossing $89 million against a $25 million budget.

== Plot ==
Kenna Rowan pleads guilty to vehicular manslaughter for a car accident that resulted in the death of her boyfriend, Scotty Landry. Six years later, she is released from prison on parole and moves back to her hometown. Kenna hopes to meet her five-year-old daughter Diem, whom she gave birth to during her sentence and has been raised by Scotty's parents, Grace and Patrick.

Kenna moves into a low-income housing complex, where she adopts a kitten at her landlady's insistence. She also befriends Lady Diana, her younger neighbor with Down Syndrome whose father is incarcerated. After a fruitless day of job-searching, Kenna wanders into her and Scotty's favorite bookstore, which has been converted into a bar.

Kenna and the owner hit it off, but she declines his invitation to go on a date. She hastily leaves after realizing that he is Ledger Ward, Scotty's lifelong best friend who was in the NFL during their relationship. Ledger still lives across the street from Grace and Patrick and acts as a surrogate uncle to Diem. Grace, meanwhile, dodges Diem's questions about her mother's absence.

With the help of Amy, a sympathetic grocery store worker, Kenna finally finds a job as a grocery bagger. She stops by the Landry house, but Ledger, who is then leaving, realizes she is Diem's mother. He, Grace, and Patrick still blame Kenna for Scotty's death and bar her from seeing her daughter.

While Grace and Diem are out shopping, they nearly wander into Kenna's store, but Ledger intercepts them and prevents Diem from seeing Kenna. After receiving some advice from his friend and co-worker Roman, he visits Kenna and they kiss. However, she pushes Ledger away, out of fear that they will complicate things further.

After a romantic date, Ledger insists on knowing how the evening of Scotty's death unfolded. Kenna then reads to him from her diary; the accident was caused because both she and Scotty were high, and Kenna was able to free herself from the car. The blood supply to Scotty's arm had stopped, so when Kenna could not find a pulse, she assumed he was dead.

Desperate, Kenna sought help, but no one came to her aid. She was eventually arrested, unconscious, by the police. Overwhelmed with guilt over his death and the fact that she had not known Scotty was still alive, Kenna pleaded guilty. Only afterward did she learn that she was pregnant. Kenna also tearfully reveals that she never got the chance to hold Diem after giving birth, because she was born prematurely.

On Mother's Day, Diem expresses a desire to give flowers to her mother, so Ledger delivers a bouquet to Kenna. They go on another date but are discovered by Patrick, who angrily punches Ledger for what he sees as betrayal. Ledger goes to Kenna's apartment but discovers she is packing with the intention of leaving. Unable to make her stay, he steals her diary and delivers it to Grace and Patrick, asking them to read the section on Scotty's death.

After reading the pages, Grace has a change of heart. Visiting Kenna to return the diary, she tells her that Scotty would have wanted her to meet their daughter. Ledger sees Kenna arriving at Grace and Patrick's. They inform him that she is coming for dinner and invite Ledger to join.

A nervous Kenna asks Ledger to come with her to meet Diem. Kenna originally only introduces herself as Ledger's friend but later, while playing, tells Diem that she is her mother. The reconciled family enjoy dinner and Diem falls asleep on Kenna.

Later, Ledger drives Kenna and Diem to the spot where the car crash occurred and they reinstate Scotty's roadside memorial, as Kenna had taken it down on her way into town because Scotty did not like memorials. She tells Diem that putting the memorial back up will make Grace happy.

== Cast ==
- Maika Monroe as Kenna Rowan
- Tyriq Withers as Ledger Ward
- Rudy Pankow as Scotty Landry
- Lainey Wilson as Amy Matthews
- Nicholas Duvernay as Roman
- Lauren Graham as Grace Landry
- Bradley Whitford as Patrick Landry
- Jennifer Robertson as Ruth Clayton
- Zoe Kosovic as Diem Landry
- Monika Myers as Lady Diana
- Hilary Jardine as Mary Anne Walker
- Natascha Girgis as Ivy

== Production ==
In October 2024, Universal Pictures announced an adaptation of Colleen Hoover's novel Reminders of Him was in the works, with Hoover and Lauren Levine writing the script. Hoover and Levine are also responsible for the production of the film together with Gina Matthews. Later in December of that year, Vanessa Caswill was announced as director. In March 2025, Maika Monroe joined the cast. In April, Tyriq Withers, Rudy Pankow, Lauren Graham, Nicholas Duvernay, Bradley Whitford, and Lainey Wilson joined the cast.

=== Filming ===
Principal photography began in Calgary on April 16, 2025, and wrapped on June 12, 2025.

=== Post-production ===
Tom Howe composed the film's score.

== Release ==
Reminders of Him premiered at Los Angeles on March 9, 2026, and was released in the United States on March 13, 2026. It was previously scheduled to be released on February 13, 2026 and February 6.

== Reception ==
=== Box office ===
In the United States and Canada, Reminders of Him was released alongside Undertone, and was projected to gross $10–15 million from 3,402 theaters in its opening weekend. The film made $8 million on its first day, including $1.9 million in Thursday box office previews, which led to an $18 million opening weekend. As of May 15, 2026, it has grossed $49 million in the United States and Canada, and $40 million overseas for a worldwide total of $89 million.

=== Critical response ===
On the review aggregator website Rotten Tomatoes, 56% of 117 critics' reviews are positive, with an average rating of 5.5/10. The website's consensus reads: "Adapted with admirable restraint and sensitive performances, Reminders of Him doesn't stir the passions enough to qualify as quality melodrama but does contain a respectable amount of grace notes." Metacritic, which uses a weighted average, assigned the film a score of 49 out of 100, based on 29 critics, indicating "mixed or average" reviews. Audiences polled by CinemaScore gave the film an average grade of "B" on an A+ to F scale, while 66% surveyed by PostTrak said they would definitely recommend it.

Eileen Jones of Jacobin wrote that the film had "nothing going on but vague sappy fantasies pumped up to hysterical soap opera levels".
