= Kalani Queypo =

American actor (born 1986)

- Born: September 6, 1986 (age 40); Hawaii, U.S.
- Occupations: Actor, Dancer, Filmmaker
- Years active: 1996-present

Kalani Queypo (born September 6, 1986) is an American actor best known for his role as Chacrow on Jamestown and Klah Jackson on Fear the Walking Dead.

== Biography ==
Kalani Queypo claimed that he grew up being "artistic". His family were dancers and he was trained in classic hula dancing. He was raised by a single mother as his father died when he was nine. He had initially wanted to be a lawyer and then a news anchor. When he was placed in an acting program in school, he realized he could be those two things and more. "I think that what interested me was human behavior and the way that people related to each other and I think my family really developed a great empathy with me and the arts sort of found me". After graduating high school, he began searching for acting programs until he decided to move to New York to expand his career.

He found his way into starring in numerous television projects such as Into the West, Mad Men and Saints & Strangers as Squanto. He also appeared in the Terrence Malick epic The New World. He appeared as Klah Jackson on Fear the Walking Dead and has a major role as Chacrow in Jamestown.

At the 9th Canadian Screen Awards in 2021, he received a nomination for Best Supporting Actor in a Drama Series for Trickster.

== Personal life ==
Queypo is a founding member of the National American Indian Committee at SAG/AFTRA.

== Filmography ==
Film roles
Year	Title	Role	Notes
1996	The Juror	Deer Dancer	
1996	Taxi Bhaiya	Amol	
2001	The Royal Tenenbaums	New Guinea Tribesman	
2005	End of the Spear	Angel	
2005	The New World	Parahunt	
2006	Pow Wow Dreams	Cute Native Guy	Short film
2007	Aztec Rex	Xocozin	
2007	He Can't Be Caught	Fred	Short film
2008	Ancestor Eyes	—N/a	Short film; Director, producer and writer
2009	Jason's Big Problem	Dom	
2010	The Sierra	Native Man	Short film
2010	Love & Vengeance		Short film
2011	6B: An Anthology of Hawaii Films		
2014	10,000 Days	Ignacio	
2015	Slow West	Kotori	
2015	The Daughters of Eve	Radley	Short film
2016	Movie Night		Short film
2017	Pandora's Lake	Art	Short film

Television roles
Year	Title	Role	Notes
2000	Strangers with Candy	Hopi	Episode: "Trail of Tears"; Uncredited
2005	Into the West	White Bird	Episode: "Casualties of War"; Miniseries
2006	Bones	Alex Joseph	Episode: "The Skull in the Desert"
2006	The Minor Accomplishments of Jackie Woodman	Russel Two Clouds	Episode: "Peyote Ugly"
2010	10,000 Days	Ignacio	Main cast
2011	Nurse Jackie	Joseph Delaronde	Episode: "Orchids and Salami"
2012	Aspen the Series	James	Main cast
2013	Mad Men	Master of Ceremonies	2 episodes
2015	Saints & Strangers	Squanto	Miniseries
2017	Hawaii Five-0	Kanuha Noe	Episode: "Ka Laina Ma Ke One"
2017	Fear the Walking Dead	Klah Jackson	3 episodes
2017–2019	Jamestown	Chacrow	Main cast
2020	Trickster	Wade	TV series
2022	Curious George	Pool Attendant	Voice: 1 episode

Video game roles
Year	Title	Role	Notes
2005	Age of Empires III	Hiawatha	
2022	Wylde Flowers	Thomas Lightfoot	Voice
2023	Cyberpunk 2077: Phantom Liberty	Shank	Voice
2024	Indiana Jones and the Great Circle	Peruvian Porter	Motion capture
2025	Metroid Prime 4: Beyond	Reger Tokabi	Voice
