= Cape Town Film Studios =

South African film and television studio

Coordinates: 34.0319°S 18.7199°E

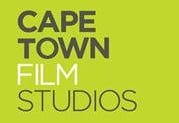
- Company type: Independent
- Industry: Film
- Founded: 2010
- Headquarters: Faure, Cape Town, South Africa
- Key people: Makkie Slamong (CEO)
- Website: www.capetownfilmstudios.co.za

Cape Town Film Studios is a film and television studio in Cape Town, South Africa. It opened in May 2010.

The 200-hectare studio, located about 30 kilometres from the centre of Cape Town, has been involved in the production of a number of blockbusters, including Chronicle (2012), Dredd (2012), Mad Max: Fury Road (2015), Maze Runner: The Death Cure (2018), Tomb Raider (2018), Bloodshot (2020) and Monster Hunter (2020). It was also involved in the production of several television shows, including Black Sails (2014–2017) and Good Omens (2019).

== Productions ==
The studio has been involved in a number of movies and television shows including:

=== Films ===
- Chronicle (2012)
- Safe House (2012)
- Dredd (2012)
- Mad Max: Fury Road (2015)
- Maze Runner: The Death Cure (2018)
- Tomb Raider (2018)
- The Red Sea Diving Resort (2019)
- Inside Man: Most Wanted (2019)
- Bloodshot (2020)
- Monster Hunter (2020)

=== Television ===
- The Great British Story: A People's History (2012)
- Labyrinth (2012)
- Black Sails (2014–2017)
- Saints & Strangers (2015)
- Blood Drive (2017)
- Doctor Who (series 11) (2018)
- Good Omens (2019)
- Warrior (2019–2020)
- Resident Evil (2021)
- One Piece (2023)

== See also ==
- List of film production companies
- List of television production companies
