= Aztec Rex =

- Poster
- Written by: Richard Manning
- Directed by: Brian Trenchard-Smith
- Starring: Ian Ziering; Dichen Lachman; Marc Antonio; Allen Gumapac; Kalani Queypo; Shawn Lathrop
- Country of origin: United States
- Original language: English

Production
- Producer: David Kemper
- Budget: $900,000

Original release
- Network: Syfy
- Release: May 10, 2008

Aztec Rex, also known as Tyrannosaurus Azteca, is a film directed by Brian Trenchard-Smith and starring Ian Ziering. The film debuted on the cable television channel Syfy in 2008. The film was filmed largely on location at Kualoa Ranch on the island of Oahu in Hawaii.

== Plot ==
Taking place in 1521 on the coast of Mexico, a group of Aztecs worships and makes sacrifices to a pair of living Tyrannosaurus rex. which is often the hearts of young women A group of conquistadores led by Hernán Cortés later arrive on the location and venture into the forest to make camp. One of the Tyrannosaurs crosses the path of one of the conquistadores and devours Cortés's horse. His fellow conquistadores do not believe his story and continue to venture through the dense forest. An Aztec who is not aware of the Tyrannosaur is eaten, while another witnesses the event with an expression of deep horror and surprise. Later, the conquistadores try to kill the tribe of Aztecs, but are put to sleep by a hidden Aztec with a tube of tranquilizer darts. Hernán Cortés surrenders and demands a truce, but realizes they cannot understand him. He murmurs to himself that they are savages, not realizing the chief can understand Spanish, and is knocked out. Once he regains consciousness, he meets a Spanish-speaking female Aztec. She tells him the Aztecs call the Tyrannosaurs "Thunder Lizards".

Later, Hernán Cortés is offered up as a sacrifice, but is freed by his new friend, Gria. It is revealed that of Hernán's fault, the female, who was the chief's daughter, was consumed by one of the Tyrannosaurs. The chief becomes enraged, but he does not know that his daughter Ayacoatl is actually alive and it was her friend who was eaten in her place. The chief orders a sacrifice of all the conquistadores, but his mind changes when his daughter returns. The daughter's marriage is postponed when a Tyrannosaur kills another Aztec girl. The conquistadores set out on a mission to kill the Tyrannosaurs with cannons and muskets. They succeed in killing the male at the loss of one of their companions. At night Cortez and his soldiers rob the temple of gold and try to escape to the coast.

They leave lieutenant Rios and sergeant Mendoza to the mercy of the Aztecs as they had become too friendly with them. In their escape to the coast, all but Cortes are brutally slaughtered by the female Tyrannosaurus. Sergeant Mendoza is mortally wounded by the Tyrannosaurus and dies before his devastated comrades. Rios and shaman Xocozin set out to try to kill the animal, but Rios has been secretly drugged by Xocozin who tries to kill him. Xocozin leaves Rios to his fate and heads to the village where he is confronted by the Chief who found out his betrayal. Xocozin and the Chief fight with the latter being mortally wounded. Eventually Rios is found by Ayacoatl and Fra Gria who marries them at their request, the Chief (who witnesses) gives blessing to the union before dying in peace. At the altar Xocozin confronts the survivors and is fatally wounded by Rios after a fierce fight. Ayacoatl then cuts out the dying Xocozin's heart to use as bait for the female Tyrannosaurus who then is killed in a gunpowder explosion. Fra Gria and Cortes are picked up by a Spanish ship, the latter being warned by Rios not to return to the valley; which Cortes never did when he conquered the Aztec Empire. Fra Gria returned to Spain, became a saint and the inventor of Sangria. Ayacoatl and Rios become rulers of the tribe who ended the sacrifice rite.

== Cast ==
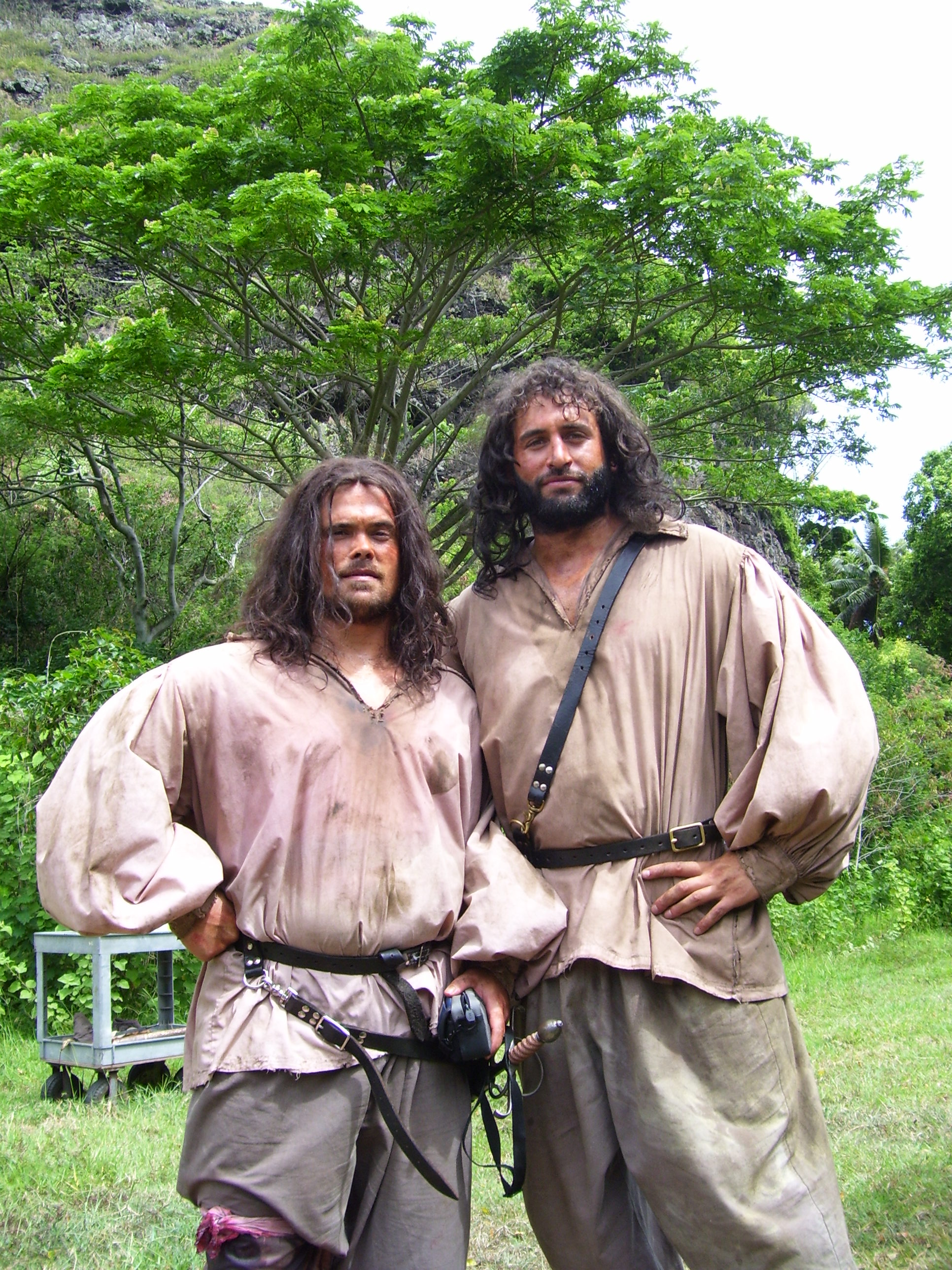
Shawn Lathrop and Marc Antonion on the set of Aztec Rex (July 2007)

- Ian Ziering as Hernán Cortés
- Jack McGee as Fra Gria
- Dichen Lachman as Ayacoatl
- Marco Sanchez as Rios
- Kalani Queypo as Xocozin
- William Snow as Mendoza
- Shawn Lathrop as Alvarado

== See also ==
- List of films featuring dinosaurs
