= As Is (film) =

1986 television film directed by Michael Lindsay-Hogg

- Video cover
- Based on: As Is (play)
- Written by: William M. Hoffman
- Directed by: Michael Lindsay-Hogg
- Starring: Colleen Dewhurst; Robert Carradine; Jonathan Hadary; Joanna Miles; Alan Scarfe
- Theme music composer: Peter Matz
- Composer: Peter Matz
- Country of origin: United States
- Original language: English

Production
- Executive producer: Michael Brandman
- Producers: Iris Merlis; Patrick Whitley
- Cinematography: Rene Ohashi
- Editor: Ruth Foster
- Running time: 86 minutes
- Budget: $600,000

Original release
- Network: Showtime
- Release: July 27, 1986

As Is is a 1986 American television film directed by Michael Lindsay-Hogg. It was adapted by William M. Hoffman from his 1985 play of the same title. The film stars Jonathan Hadary, Robert Carradine, Colleen Dewhurst and Joanna Miles. It premiered on Showtime on July 27, 1986. Several networks rejected the TV adaptation. Hadary and Carradine were both nominated for CableACE Awards. The movie centers on a group of gay male friends dealing with AIDS in New York City.

== Synopsis ==
The movie depicts the effect that AIDS, a relatively new epidemic in the 1980s, has on a group of gay friends living in New York City. The movie begins with gay couple Saul and Rich, who have recently separated. After Rich contracts AIDS from his new lover Chet, he returns to Saul, who ends up caring for him. The movie also shows how people with AIDS were treated by the American public, doctors, co-workers, and families and friends. In the end, Rich recognizes the importance of having a partner who is willing to share the grief of dying, and is also willing to make their own personal sacrifices in order to provide another with proper care.

== Cast ==
- Robert Carradine as Rich
- Jonathan Hadary as Saul
- Doug Annear as Chet
- Colleen Dewhurst as Hospice Worker
- Joanna Miles as Lily
- Alan Scarfe as Brother
- Julie Whitfield as Brother's Wife
- Samantha Langevin as Partner
- Reg Drager as Doctor #1
- Gerald Lenton as Doctor #2
- Tonya Williams as TV Commentator
- Jeremy Ratchford as Pickup #1
- Chris Owens as Pickup #2

== Production notes ==
William Hoffman, who wrote both the movie script and stage play, said the film was toned down from the stage version, mainly in its language. Executive producer Michael Brandman said he didn't want to "muddy the water with gratuitous profanity. We did keep some of the language, but I think it is highlighted more effectively because it's used more sparingly. Four-letter words offend some people tremendously, and we didn't want to risk losing those people who might benefit from what the piece was saying." The movie was filmed in Toronto, on a budget of $600,000, which is slightly higher than that for other filmed plays presented on Showtime.

== Critical reception ==
Entertainment Weekly wrote that the characters in the movie are "brought vividly to life by playwright William Hoffman's eloquently brutal script", and it gave the film an A rating. Richard Christiansen of the Chicago Tribune wrote "the swift, impressionistic flow of images, which worked well in the theater, seems to diffuse the drama in the film version." He also stated that Jonathan Hadary "often delivers his lines with a punch more suited to the stage than to the naturalistic environment of movies". But overall, he said the "profound issue of coming to terms with one's life in the face of death is classic and timeless."

The New York Times wrote the film "finds its emotional anchor in the deeply sensitive performance of Jonathan Hadary as the friend who acts as loyal attendant", and although the movie "occasionally overreaches, as in an awkward attempt at an epiphany, it is buoyed by its humor as characters find a release, if not a relief, in examining their own helplessness." Hadary and Carradine were both nominated for CableACE Awards for Actor in a theatrical or dramatic special.
