= Jake LeDoux =

Canadian actor (born 1985)

- Born: 2 May 1985 (age 40); Port Perry, Ontario, Canada
- Occupation: Actor
- Years active: 1999 – present

Jake LeDoux (born 2 May 1985 in Port Perry, Ontario) is a Canadian actor.

In the movie Summer's End from 1999, he appeared together with Wendy Crewson and James Earl Jones. In 2000 was nominated to "Young Artist Award" in category: "Best Performance in a TV Movie or Pilot – Leading Young Actor"

== Filmography ==
=== Movies ===
- 1999 Summer's End – as Jamie Baldwin
- 1999 Switching Goals – as Richie
- 1999 Killer Deal as Nick Quinn
- 2000 Love Come Down as jung Matthew
- 2007 Devil's Diary as Nate
- 2009 Personal Effects as Maloni

=== TV series ===
- 2000 Real Kids, Real Adventures
- 2006 Smallville
- 2007 The 4400
- 2006 Intelligence
