= The Christmas Wife =

- Genre: Drama
- Based on: A short story by Helen Norris
- Screenplay by: Catherine Ann Jones
- Directed by: David Jones
- Starring: Jason Robards; Julie Harris; Don Francks; James Eckhouse; Patricia Hamilton; Deborah Grover
- Theme music composer: Max Harris
- Country of origin: United States
- Original language: English

Production
- Executive producers: Colin Callender; Eric Landau
- Producers: Patrick Whitley; Edie Landau
- Production location: Toronto
- Cinematography: Brian West
- Editor: Ruth Foster
- Running time: 73 minutes
- Production company: HBO Showcase

Original release
- Network: HBO
- Release: December 12, 1988

The Christmas Wife is a 1988 American drama film directed by David Jones and written by Catherine Ann Jones. It stars Jason Robards, Julie Harris, Don Francks, James Eckhouse, Patricia Hamilton and Deborah Grover. The film premiered at the Denver Film Festival in October 1988. It was shown on HBO on December 12, 1988.

== Plot ==
John Tanner (Robards), a retired architect who is recently widowed, decides to look for a platonic lady companion for the Christmas period at his lakeside cabin (as he always had with his deceased wife), instead of flying out west to see his son and his family. He meets a "social arranger" (Francks) who introduces him to a woman of about his own age, Iris (Harris). They meet at a hotel lobby/plaza in town and she tells him she would like to go ahead, but that they should meet later at the local bus depot before departing for the holiday. She is insistent that he does not ask her any personal questions.

They go to a cabin in the countryside where he had spent many previous Christmases with his wife. After an uneasy start Iris reveals that she used to be a nurse but most of the time she is non-committal.

The next morning, John gives Iris a Christmas present of a music box which she seems very touched by. Before lunch, they take a walk in the woods then return to the cabin where after eating, he tells her that he used to play the tiple at Christmas. When Iris presses him he produces a tiple and plays it while he sings a song. She recites a poem by Dorothy Parker which he applauds her for. She then tells him that she is not being honest with him but not why; she also tells him that it is time he "let go" of his wife; they hug.

Later during the night John is woken from his sleep by the sound of the music box. He goes downstairs to find Iris listening to it. In silence he takes her hand and leads her back upstairs where they look wistfully at each other before going to their separate rooms.

The following morning he rises to find that Iris has cooked breakfast and is preparing to leave. John becomes exasperated at Iris's incommunicative nature and demands to know more about her. She reveals that she is married and John deduces that the social arranger is her husband. She had agreed to meet John only for the $500 agency fee – business was poor at that time of year and they needed the money.

John and Iris part company. Another day, he goes to his usual cafe with a book, where he notices a woman (Helen Frost) that he had seen before, also with a book. He asks the waitress if the woman would tell her about the book she is reading. When the waitress returns she says to him "She says she'll trade ya". John and the woman exchange smiles...

== Cast ==
- Jason Robards as John Tanner
- Julie Harris as Iris
- Don Francks as Social Arranger
- James Eckhouse as Jim Tanner
- Patricia Hamilton as Dora
- Deborah Grover as Micki
- David Gardner as Harry
- Tom Harvey as Jack
- Christopher Andrade as Tommy
- Steven Andrade as Tim
- Bill Lynn as Santa Claus
- Helen Frost as Woman In Restaurant
