= Age-Old Friends =

1989 TV film directed by Allan Kroeker

- Genre: Comedy
- Written by: Bob Larbey
- Directed by: Allan Kroeker
- Starring: Hume Cronyn; Vincent Gardenia; Barry Flatman; Michele Scarabelli; Esther Rolle; Aaron Schwartz
- Theme music composer: Stanley Myers
- Original language: English

Production
- Executive producers: Colin Callender; Simon R. Lewis
- Producer: Patrick Whitley
- Production location: Shouldice, Ontario
- Cinematography: Ludek Bogner
- Editor: Ronald Sanders
- Running time: 87 minutes
- Production companies: Granger Productions; HBO Showcase

Original release
- Network: HBO
- Release: December 16, 1989

Age-Old Friends is a 1989 television drama film directed by Allan Kroeker and starring Hume Cronyn and Vincent Gardenia, who won Primetime Emmy Awards for their performances. It was written by Bob Larbey, based on his play A Month of Sundays.

== Premise ==
Two men at an affluent retirement home fight for their independence and dignity in old age.

== Cast ==
- Hume Cronyn as John Cooper
- Vincent Gardenia as Michael Aylott
- Tandy Cronyn as Julia
- Barry Flatman as Peter
- Michele Scarabelli as Nurse Wilson
- Esther Rolle as Mrs. Baker
- Aaron Schwartz as Dr. Spears

== Reception ==
The Los Angeles Times raved, "HBO tonight gives us the performance of the season in the story of the season. Hume Cronyn and Age-Old Friends are that outstanding."

== Awards ==
Hume Cronyn won a Primetime Emmy Award for Outstanding Lead Actor in a Miniseries or Movie and Vincent Gardenia won Outstanding Supporting Actor in a Miniseries or Movie.
