= Patrick Whitley =

Canadian television producer

- Occupation: Television producer
- Known for: Second City TV; Canada's Next Top Model

Patrick Whitley is a Canadian television producer.

== Background ==
Whitley began in the television industry at CFTO in 1970. He is known for his 5 years with Second City TV, producing award-winning films for Showtime, and as producer of Canada's Next Top Model. In 1994 Whitley founded the Canadian production company Dufferin Gate, and in 1997 founded Temple Street Entertainment. In 1999 he was elected to the board of the Canadian Film & Television Association (CFTA) and in 2000 became its vice-chairman. In 2003 he launched the Ontario Film and Television Consortium (later renamed Film Ontario), and in 2004 he launched the Canadian Film & Television Industry Council. In 2006 he sold his interests in Dufferin Gate and Temple Street Entertainment.

== Awards and recognition ==
- 2003, receives 'Entrepreneur of the Year Award' at Banff Television Festival
- 2000, nominated for Gemini Award for Restless Spirits
- 2000, won Daytime Emmy Award for Summer's End
- 2000, nominated for Daytime Emmy Award for Sea People
- 1999, nominated for Daytime Emmy Award for The Sweetest Gift
- 1998, won Daytime Emmy Award for In His Father's Shoes
- 1997, nominated for Cable Ace Award for In His Father's Shoes
- 1990, won Wise Owl Award from Retirement Research Foundation for Age-Old Friends
- 1983, nominated for an Emmy Award for SCTV Network 90
- 1982, nominated for an Emmy Award for SCTV Network 90

== Filmography ==
- Canada's Next Top Model (8 episodes, 2006)
- Blueprint for Disaster (1 episode, 2005)
- Restless Spirits (1999)
- Sea People (1999)
- Summer's End (1999)
- The Sweetest Gift (1998)
- In His Father's Shoes (1997)
- The Best of John Candy on SCTV (1996)
- The Legend of Gator Face (1996)
- Down Came a Blackbird (1995)
- Mrs. Munck (1995)
- Hostage for a Day (1994)
- To Catch a Killer (1992)
- Rosencrantz & Guildenstern Are Dead (1990)
- Age-Old Friends (1989)
- The Christmas Wife (1988)
- The Best of SCTV 1988)
- Tidy Endings (1988)
- Betrayal of Silence (1988)
- Dynaman (1988)
- Really Weird Tales (1987)
- As Is (1986)
- Grown-Ups (1985)
- SCTV Channel (18 episodes, 1983–1984)
- SCTV Network 90 (31 episodes, 1981–1983)
- Second City TV (52 episodes, 1978–1981)
