= The Oaks (TV pilot) =

- Created by: David Schulner
- Starring: Sienna Guillory; Matt Lanter; Shannon Lucio; Matthew Morrison; Romy Rosemont; Michael Rispoli; Jeremy Renner; Bahar Soomekh; Kyle Kaplan; Mackenzie Milone
- Country of origin: United States

Production
- Production companies: Little Engine Productions; MiddKid Productions; Mount Moriah; 20th Century Fox Television

The Oaks is an American supernatural drama television pilot, created by David Schulner for the Fox network's 2008/2009 season. The addition to the Fox line-up was speculated to be a much-needed high-concept drama, purportedly to compete in ratings with ABC's Lost, Desperate Housewives, and Grey's Anatomy, and with CBS's CSI: Crime Scene Investigation and its various spin-off shows. In spite of making an early blind series commitment, Fox did not pick up the drama for the 2008/2009 season. It was reportedly shopped to other networks, with a UK remake of the show, Marchlands, produced in 2010.

== Overview ==
The Oaks follows the lives of three families, in different time periods, who all occupy the same house haunted by a restless spirit. The previous house owners also appear to their successors as ghosts. Writer Schulner explains, "Each personal story, each small relationship story is tied to a larger ghost story. I can't tell the story of one family without telling the story of another family that lived there."

Three families over the span of four decades, move into the same house, and they are all haunted by a restless spirit. The families are as follows:

- 1968 - A young couple who have just lost their child.
- 1988 - A family of four.
- 2008 - A young couple expecting a baby.

In 1968, estranged couple Sarah and Mike harbor deep feelings of resentment and sorrow, aimed at each other after the death of their young daughter Amelia. In 1988, sexually frustrated husband and wife Frank and Molly raise their two children, Lucy and Brian. In 2008, the power couple of pregnant Hollis and her emasculated husband Dan move into the same house as the other families and during renovation, are quick to find something that sheds light on the house's secrets. It is revealed in the pilot, titled Amelia, that "several characters have unexpected connections to the past in some very novel ways".

== Characters ==
The following has been revealed about the characters:

- Mike (played by Matt Lanter) is a part of the 1968 couple. He is Sarah's husband who is "strong but silent," works at his father's company and seems at first to be under his father's thumb. He has become reticent and distant since the loss of his and Sarah's young daughter Amelia within the last year. The death has somewhat made the two lose their will to continue as a family, and when Mike attempts to reconnect with Sarah, "all he can see is Amelia."
- Sarah (played by Shannon Lucio) is a part of the 1968 couple. "Quietly devastated," she is Mike's wife who has also become increasingly full of sorrow since the death of their child. Sarah seeks counseling from their Priest, but it does little to help as she often believes she can feel Amelia's presence or hear her voice.
- Molly (played by Romy Rosemont) is the mother in the 1988 family. Molly is a mother of two who is struggling to keep her marriage alive.
- Frank (played by Michael Rispoli) is a part of the 1988 family. Frank is husband to Molly and father to Brian and Lucy.
- Brian (played by Kyle Kaplan) is a part of the 1988 family. Brian is brother to Lucy and son to Molly and Frank.
- Lucy (played by Mackenzie Milone) is a part of the 1988 family. Lucy is sister to Brian and daughter to Molly and Frank.
- Hollis (played by Bahar Soomekh) is a pregnant woman in the 2008 couple. She is a type A personality who speaks several languages, and is a highly educated, BlackBerry-obsessed, and capable executive. A power couple with her emasculated husband Dan, whom she is very in love with, she is carrying their first child as well.
- Dan (played by Jeremy Renner) is a part of the 2008 couple, Hollis' husband and an expectant father. Dan and Hollis cannot agree on whether to have their baby tested for disabilities, a point that seems to be brought further to light when they meet their neighbor Jessica, a developmentally disabled woman who seems to have a history with Dan.
- Jessica (played by Sienna Guillory) is the 2008 couple's next-door neighbor. Jessica, who has Asperger syndrome, attended school with the father-to-be and shares a secret with him.
- Young Jessica (played by Johanna E. Braddy) is the 2008 character during the year 1988.
- Young Dan (played by Soren Fulton) is the 2008 character during the year 1988.
- Helen (played by Alexandra Lydon) is a friend of Sarah and Mike, the 1968 couple.
- Jim (played by Matthew Morrison) is a friend of Sarah and Mike, the 1968 couple.

== Production ==
=== Development ===
David Schulner wrote the script and was inspired when moving into a new house himself, thinking about those who had lived there previously. In 2007, after a heated bidding war between Fox, ABC and CBS for Schulner's concept for The Oaks, it was eventually narrowed down to CBS and Fox, with Fox ultimately taking the show for their line up in August, 2007.

Shawn Ryan, Gina Matthews, Grant Scharbo and with Michael Cuesta produced The Oaks. Cuesta directed the pilot titled Amelia. Production on the series officially began on November 5, 2007 with the filming of the pilot episode. "Amelia" was filmed on location in South Pasadena, California, however, Schuler and Ryan participated in the 2007-08 Writers Guild of America strike that began that day at 12:01 A.M., causing the two to be absent on set for filming. On November 12, it was announced that the 1988 portion of the series would make tonal changes to become more comedic, along with other cast changes to accommodate. However, the changes to The Oaks casting and tone was approved by Schulner and Ryan. Filming on the pilot was completed in late November.

=== Casting ===
Linda Lowy and John Brace cast the pilot in Los Angeles. In September 2007, Bahar Soomekh as Hollis, Matt Lanter as Mike and Shannon Lucio as Sarah, were officially cast. October saw the addition of British actresses Gina McKee as Molly and Sienna Guillory as Jessica, and the actor Jeremy Renner as Dan. In November when filming began, Gina Mckee was replaced by actress Romy Rosemont to better accommodate the more comedic and blue collar direction taken for the 1988 family and for the character Molly. The addition of Michael Rispoli as Frank was also announced. Because Schulner and Ryan were absent due to the writers' strike, casting of Rispoli and Rosement was overseen by nonwriting executive producer Gina Matthews.

== International versions ==
A UK-based remake of The Oaks, entitled Marchlands, began airing on ITV1 on 3 February 2011. The UK version stars Alex Kingston. A second series called Lightfields began on ITV1 on 27 February 2013. Featuring different families at a new house, the titular 'Lightfields', across the 1940s, 1970s and present.

A France-based remake of The Oaks, entitled Le Secret d'Élise, began airing on the Switzerland channel RTS Un on 19 September 2015, on the Belgium channel La Une on 22 September 2015 and on the French channel TF1 on 8 February 2016. It stars Bénabar, Hélène de Fougerolles and Bruno Salomone.
