= Summer's End =

1999 TV film by Helen Shaver

- DVD cover
- Screenplay by: Grant Scharbo; Jim Thompson
- Story by: Grant Scharbo
- Directed by: Helen Shaver
- Starring: James Earl Jones; Jake LeDoux; Brendan Fletcher; Wendy Crewson
- Composer: Lawrence Shragge
- Countries of origin: Canada; United States
- Original language: English

Production
- Producers: Gina Matthews; Frank Siracusa; Connie Tavel; Patrick Whitley
- Cinematography: Andreas Poulsson
- Editor: Rick Martin
- Running time: 107 minutes
- Production company: Temple Street Productions

Original release
- Network: Showtime
- Release: February 28, 1999

Summer's End is a 1999 drama television film directed by Helen Shaver (in her directorial debut) from a screenplay by Grant Scharbo and Jim Thompson, based on a story by Scharbo. The film tells the story of two teenage brothers who have lost their father, one of which befriends an African-American physician facing racial prejudice in a small town in Georgia.

The film premiered on Showtime on February 28, 1999. It received nominations for four Daytime Emmy Awards, and won for best children's special and also best actor (James Earl Jones).

== Plot ==
A young boy, still grieving over his father's death, befriends a retired physician, the former chief of cardiology at an Atlanta hospital who has returned to his hometown in North Georgia where he had a traumatic boyhood; but racial intolerance in the local, predominantly white, lakeside community ends up souring the relationship.

== Cast ==
- James Earl Jones as Dr. William 'Bill' Blakely
- Jake LeDoux as Jamie Baldwin
- Brendan Fletcher as Hunter Baldwin
- Wendy Crewson as Virginia Baldwin
- Jonathan Kroeker as Lad Trapnell
- Al Waxman as Grandpa Trapnell
- Andrew Sardella as Alex Rifkin
- R.D. Reid as Henry Whitley
- Gary Reineke as Sheriff Miller
- Patrick McManus as Inspector
- Randy Hughson as Rainey
- Sarah Francis as Erinn
- Victor Garber as narrator
