= Isn't It Romantic (2019 film) =

2019 film by Todd Strauss-Schulson

- Theatrical release poster
- Directed by: Todd Strauss-Schulson
- Screenplay by: Erin Cardillo; Dana Fox; Katie Silberman
- Story by: Erin Cardillo
- Produced by: Todd Garner; Grant Scharbo; Gina Matthews
- Starring: Rebel Wilson; Liam Hemsworth; Adam DeVine; Priyanka Chopra Jonas
- Cinematography: Simon Duggan
- Edited by: Andrew Marcus
- Music by: John Debney
- Production companies: New Line Cinema; Bron Creative; Camp Sugar; Little Engine; Broken Road Productions
- Distributed by: Warner Bros. Pictures (United States and Canada); Netflix (International)
- Release date: February 13, 2019 (United States)
- Running time: 89 minutes
- Country: United States
- Language: English
- Budget: $31 million
- Box office: $48.8 million

Isn't It Romantic is a 2019 American meta romantic comedy film directed by Todd Strauss-Schulson and written by Erin Cardillo, Dana Fox, and Katie Silberman. The film stars Rebel Wilson as a woman who finds herself in a world where everything around her plays out like a clichéd PG-13 romcom. Liam Hemsworth, Adam DeVine, and Priyanka Chopra Jonas appear in supporting roles.

The film was theatrically released in the United States on February 13, 2019, by Warner Bros. Pictures, and in international territories by Netflix on February 28, 2019. It grossed over $48 million on a $31 million budget and received generally positive reviews from critics.

== Plot ==
Natalie is an architect with a strong hatred for romantic comedies, stemmed from her negative mother who told her at an early age that girls like them cannot find love, and exacerbated by her low self-esteem and dating difficulties. Being a pushover, Natalie's lack of self-confidence causes her co-workers to dismiss her position as architect and pawn off menial tasks on her. Natalie's assistant Whitney, a fan of romantic comedies, debates their veracity with her. Natalie sees them as full of lies, corny pop songs, unrealistic, full of montages. Whitney argues that flaws are what make people beautiful. Natalie points out the many cliché Rom-Com tropes: their lack of diversity, always a gay best friend who has no life, voice-over train of thought of the protagonist, make-over montages, and slow-motion segments. Whitney says that Natalie is friend-zoning Josh, their co-worker and her close friend, and believes he is in love with Natalie. She dismisses the notion because she is overweight, and Josh appears to spend all his time staring at a model on a billboard across the street.

One day Natalie, naively believing a guy is hitting on her, is knocked unconscious during an attempted mugging in the subway and finds herself trapped in the stereotypical romantic comedies she has come to despise. Natalie arrives to a luxurious apartment and her relationships radically change. Blake, a sexy billionaire client of her company, suddenly speaks with an Australian accent and develops a romantic interest in her. Her normally gruff neighbor Donny, who has always come across as a misogynist, becomes a flamboyant homosexual friend offering advice. Whitney becomes her enemy coworker, although her other coworkers respect her. Although Josh seems to be the same as always, he uses the Heimlich maneuver to save the billboard model Isabella, who identifies herself as a "yoga ambassador". They seem to fall into love at first sight and enter into a relationship.

Desperate to return to her reality, Natalie deduces that in the tradition of romantic comedies, she can only leave by finding true love. She pursues a relationship with Blake, but when it turns sour, Natalie recognizes that she has feelings for Josh, who has become engaged to Isabella. She attempts to stop their wedding, but soon realizes that instead of loving another person, she needs to learn to first love herself. Following this revelation, Natalie gets into a car accident and loses consciousness.

Natalie wakes up in the real world, but with new self-confidence, which she uses to successfully propose an architectural idea to Blake. After reuniting with Josh, she learns that he has not been staring at the model, but at Natalie's reflection. They kiss and agree to go out on a date.

As Natalie prepares to head home, Whitney tells her that despite her dislike for romantic comedies, everything she just experienced has been comparable to one. Realizing that she has been in a romantic comedy the entire time, Natalie and the rest of the cast proceed to engage in a rendition of "Express Yourself".

== Cast ==
- Rebel Wilson as Natalie, an Australian architect living in New York.
  - Alex Kis as 12-year-old Natalie
- Liam Hemsworth as Blake, a billionaire client of Natalie's company and her potential love interest in the fantasy world.
- Adam DeVine as Josh, Natalie's best friend, co-worker and potential love interest in the fantasy world.
- Priyanka Chopra Jonas as Isabella, a billboard model who appears as a yoga ambassador in the fantasy world.
- Betty Gilpin as Whitney, Natalie's assistant and friend who becomes her nemesis in the fantasy world.
- Brandon Scott Jones as Donny, Natalie's neighbor, depicted as a flamboyant gay friend in the fantasy world.
- Jennifer Saunders as Natalie's mother
- Big Jay Oakerson as Gary
- Tom Ellis as Dr. Todd, the doctor in the fantasy world.
- Michelle Buteau as Martina
- Bowen Yang as Donny's Guy
- Eugenia Kuzmina as Fashion Model

== Production ==
On May 23, 2016, it was reported that Rebel Wilson would star as Natalie in an untitled romantic comedy film by New Line Cinema, from an original script by Erin Cardillo and rewrite by Dana Fox and Katie Silberman, while producers would be Todd Garner, Grant Scharbo, and Gina Matthews. On March 22, 2017, Todd Strauss-Schulson was hired to direct the film, titled Isn't It Romantic. On May 10, Adam DeVine, who had previously co-starred with Wilson in the first two Pitch Perfect movies, and Liam Hemsworth were cast in the film to play love interests in Natalie's life. Priyanka Chopra Jonas was also cast in the film in May. On June 14, 2017, Betty Gilpin was added, playing Natalie's assistant Whitney, one of her best friends.

Principal photography on the film began on July 10, 2017, in New York City. The final dance scene to Madonna's "Express Yourself" took place at 101 Park Avenue.

== Release ==
Isn't It Romantic was theatrically released in the United States on February 13, 2019, by Warner Bros. Pictures. The film was released internationally on February 28, 2019, by Netflix.

=== Home media ===
Isn't It Romantic was released on Blu-ray and DVD on May 21, 2019.

== Reception ==
=== Box office ===
In the United States and Canada, Isn't It Romantic was released alongside Happy Death Day 2U, and was projected to gross around $22 million from 3,300 theaters in its six-day opening weekend. After not holding Tuesday night previews, the film made $1.8 million on its first day, Wednesday, and $4.4 million on Valentine's Day, for a two-day total of $6.2 million. It went on to debut to $14.2 million over the weekend (a five-day gross of $20.4 million), finishing third at the box office. The film dropped 47% in its second weekend, making $7.5 million and finishing fifth.

=== Critical response ===
On review aggregator website Rotten Tomatoes, the film holds an approval rating of 70% based on 182 reviews, with an average rating of 6.1/10. The website's critical consensus reads: "It follows as many genre conventions as it mocks, but Isn't It Romantic is a feel-good rom-com with some satirical bite – and a star well-suited for both." On Metacritic, the film has a weighted average score of 60 out of 100, based on 33 critics, indicating "mixed or average" reviews. Audiences polled by CinemaScore gave the film an average grade of "B" on an A+ to F scale, while those at PostTrak gave it an average 3.5 out of 5 stars and a 50% "definite recommend".

Australian publication QNews reviewed the film positively, with Peter Gray saying it was "one of the better example[s] of the genre, and it helps that its cast are all wholly capable of both playing to and against the stereotypes."

== Sequel ==
New Line was developing a sequel film titled Isn't It Scary to take the same meta approach to the horror genre in 2024. April Prosser wrote the script.
