= Saints & Strangers =

- Genre: Historical drama
- Written by: Seth Fisher
- Directed by: Paul A. Edwards
- Starring: Ray Stevenson; Vincent Kartheiser; Brían F. O'Byrne; Barry Sloane; Anna Camp; Raoul Trujillo; Michael Jibson; Kalani Queypo; Michael Greyeyes; Del Zamora; Tatanka Means; Natascha McElhone; Ron Livingston
- Composer: Hans Zimmer (executive music producer)
- Country of origin: United States
- Original language: English
- No. of episodes: 2

Production
- Executive producers: Teri Weinberg; Seth Fisher; Eric Overmyer; Gina Matthews; Grant Scharbo
- Producer: Peter McAleese
- Production locations: South Africa, Africa
- Cinematography: Balazs Bolygo
- Editors: Steven Kemper; Steve Polivka
- Running time: 192 minutes
- Production companies: Sony Pictures Television; Little Engine Productions

Original release
- Network: National Geographic Channel
- Release: November 22 – November 23, 2015

Saints & Strangers is an American drama television two-part miniseries based on the book by author George Willison. It tells the story of the Mayflower voyage and chronicles the Pilgrims' first year in America and the first Thanksgiving in 1621. The program aired on the National Geographic Channel and premiered on November 22, 2015.

== Plot ==
The miniseries chronicles the real story of the Pilgrims: their harrowing voyage from England to America aboard the Mayflower and settling in Plymouth, Massachusetts; vying to survive in the harsh climate; their struggles with the local tribes, and celebrating their first Thanksgiving with the natives, the Pokanoket people, in 1621.

== Production ==
The Indigenous characters in the miniseries speak Western Abenaki, a language similar to but distinct from the language which would have been spoken by the Wampanoag of the time. National Geographic employed a dialect coach to teach the language to the actors. The miniseries was shot at the Cape Town Film Studios in South Africa.

== Cast ==
- Ray Stevenson as Stephen Hopkins
- Anna Camp as Dorothy Bradford
- Michael Jibson as Myles Standish
- Vincent Kartheiser as William Bradford
- Ron Livingston as John Carver
- Natascha McElhone as Elizabeth Hopkins
- Tatanka Means as Hobbamock
- Brían F. O'Byrne as John Billington, Sr.
- Kalani Queypo as Squanto
- Michael Greyeyes as Canonicus
- Barry Sloane as Edward Winslow
- Raoul Trujillo as Massasoit
- Del Zamora as Aspinet
- Vere Tindale as John Howland
- Chris Fisher as John Alden

== Episodes ==
Note: The miniseries was aired in two parts consisting of two-hour episodes; however, the credits list four parts with four different writers.

No.	Title	Directed by	Written by	Original release date	Viewers (millions)
1	"Part 1"	Paul A. Edwards	Story by : Eric Overmyer and Chip Johannessen; Teleplay by : Chip Johannessen, Walon Green and Eric Overmyer	November 22, 2015	N/A
2	"Part 2"	Paul A. Edwards	Seth Fisher	November 22, 2015	N/A
3	"Part 3"	Paul A Edwards	Seth Fisher	November 23, 2015	N/A
4	"Part 4"	Paul A. Edwards	Eric Overmyer	November 23, 2015	N/A

== Reception ==
Saints & Strangers received generally positive reviews from critics. Review aggregator Rotten Tomatoes gives the season a rating of 80%, based on 20 reviews, with an average rating of 6.9/10. The site's consensus states, "Saints & Strangers presents an immersive, action-fueled portrait of early American settler life, although it's slightly hampered by its somewhat shallow, didactic approach." Metacritic gives the miniseries a score of 70 out of 100, based on 14 critics, indicating "generally favorable reviews".

Critics give the miniseries mixed reviews. Keith Uhlich of The Hollywood Reporter writes, "Not quite a turkey, pilgrim. Nat Geo's two-night miniseries about the first Thanksgiving is admirable in parts, though bland overall." Maureen Ryan of Variety writes, "The serious intent of "Saints" trips it up at times; many characters remain one-dimensional, and some sequences are plodding or repetitive. That said, the mini features nuanced work in a number of the Native Americans portrayals—often the best-developed characters on the screen."

Wampanoag tribal representatives said that National Geographic asked them for linguistic assistance but severed their relationship when they asked to consult on their tribe's portrayal, instead writing the script with the distantly related language of West Abenaki. They objected to the portrayal of their tribe as violent and murderous, saying the incidents portrayed were at odds with documented historical facts.

Saints & Strangers received three Critics Choice Award Nominations as well as a WGA Award nomination for Best Television Original Long Form for which it won.
