= 13 Going on 30 =

2004 film by Gary Winick

- Theatrical release poster
- Directed by: Gary Winick
- Written by: Cathy Yuspa; Josh Goldsmith
- Produced by: Susan Arnold; Donna Arkoff Roth; Gina Matthews
- Starring: Jennifer Garner; Mark Ruffalo; Judy Greer; Andy Serkis
- Cinematography: Don Burgess
- Edited by: Susan Littenberg
- Music by: Theodore Shapiro
- Production companies: Columbia Pictures; Revolution Studios; Roth/Arnold Productions; Gina Matthews Productions
- Distributed by: Sony Pictures Releasing
- Release date: April 23, 2004
- Running time: 97 minutes
- Country: United States
- Language: English
- Budget: $37 million
- Box office: $96 million

13 Going on 30 (released as Suddenly 30 in some countries) is a 2004 American fantasy romantic comedy film written by Cathy Yuspa and Josh Goldsmith, directed by Gary Winick, starring Jennifer Garner, and Mark Ruffalo, and produced by Susan Arnold, Donna Arkoff Roth, and Gina Matthews.

The film is about a 13-year-old girl in 1987 who makes a wish, and awakens to find herself suddenly 30 years old and living in 2004 as a fashion editor.

13 Going on 30 received generally positive reviews from critics, with many praising Garner's performance and its nostalgic environment. It was also praised for its humorous plot and self-empowering message. The film was also a commercial success, earning $22 million in its first week and becoming one of the year's biggest-selling DVD rental titles. Its total box office profit was over $96 million. Additionally, the soundtrack charted inside the top 50 on the US Billboard 200 chart. Garner's acting earned her nominations from both the MTV Movie Awards and the Teen Choice Awards.

== Plot ==
In 1987 in New Jersey, nerdy 13-year-old Jenna Rink yearns to be popular. She persuades the Six Chicks, her school's ruling clique led by "Tom-Tom", to attend her birthday party by doing their homework for them. Jenna's best friend and next-door neighbor Matty Flamhaff, secretly in love with her, gifts her a handmade dollhouse and sprinkles the roof with "magic wishing dust."

The Six Chicks arrive with a group of boys, including Jenna's crush Chris Grandy. They trick Jenna into believing Chris is going to play "seven minutes in heaven" with her while they leave with the completed homework. When Matty discovers her in the closet, a humiliated Jenna barricades herself and tearfully wishes to be "thirty and flirty and thriving" as the wishing dust falls on her.

The next morning, Jenna awakens as an adult in a luxurious Fifth Avenue apartment in 2004, dating a young man she does not recognize and with no memory of the intervening seventeen years. Upon further investigation, she learns that she now works as an editor for her favorite fashion magazine, Poise, alongside her co-editor and best friend, Lucy Wyman. However, the magazine is falling behind its arch-rival Sparkle, which her editor-in-chief, Richard Kneeland, believes is the work of a saboteur. A confused Jenna locates Matty, now a struggling photographer, in Greenwich Village. He explains that in high school, she became the new head of the Six Chicks and subsequently stopped speaking to him; she also learns that Lucy is Tom-Tom.

As Jenna adjusts to her new adult life, she gradually learns that the person she has become is nothing like her shy, sweet teenage self; the adult Jenna plagiarized ideas, became estranged from her parents, and had an affair with a co-worker's husband. After overhearing Lucy plotting to remove her from a presentation on a Poise rebrand, Jenna returns to her childhood home to reunite with her parents before reconciling with Matty and hiring him to help with her presentation. They gradually fall for each other, although Matty's fiancée, Wendy, is eager for him to move to Chicago with her.

Jenna's presentation proves successful, but Lucy lies to Matty and claims Jenna did not use his photos, having him sign them over to her instead. While looking for Matty to deliver the good news, Jenna finds Wendy, who reveals that their wedding is the next day. Moreover, she learns from Kneeland that Lucy became Sparkle's new editor-in-chief by using Jenna's presentation. Outraged, she confronts Lucy, who scornfully reveals that Jenna is the one who sabotaged Poise in exchange for a position at Sparkle, though Lucy took the job first.

Jenna rushes to Matty's childhood home, where the wedding is about to take place, to explain what happened, though Matty says he already knew the truth. She tries to convince him to give their relationship a chance, promising that she is not the awful person she appears to be. Matty acknowledges his feelings for her, but rejects Jenna anyway, claiming that too many years have passed.

Matt gives her the dollhouse, which he has kept despite their estrangement, and confesses that he has always loved her. Jenna goes next door to her childhood home and breaks down in tears while holding the dollhouse. A breeze swirls some remnants of the wishing dust around her.

Jenna reawakens back in 1987 on her thirteenth birthday. When Matty finds her huddled alone in the closet, she happily embraces and kisses him. Jenna berates Lucy and her friends, destroys their completed homework, and ousts them from her house. With this second chance, Jenna lives the subsequent seventeen years differently, eventually going on to marry Matty. The newlywed couple then moves into a suburban house resembling the dollhouse Matty gave Jenna.

== Cast ==
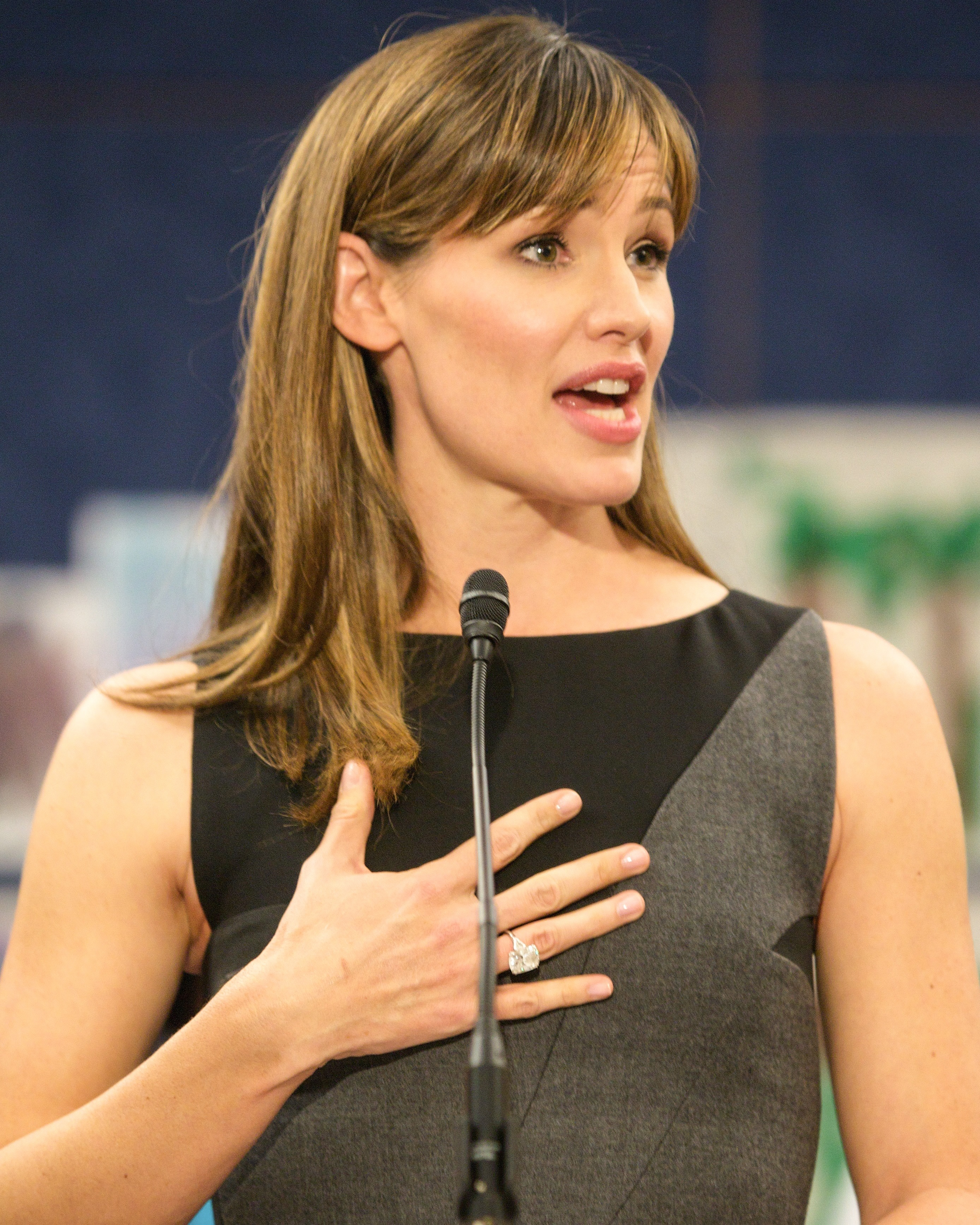
Jennifer Garner, pictured in 2013.

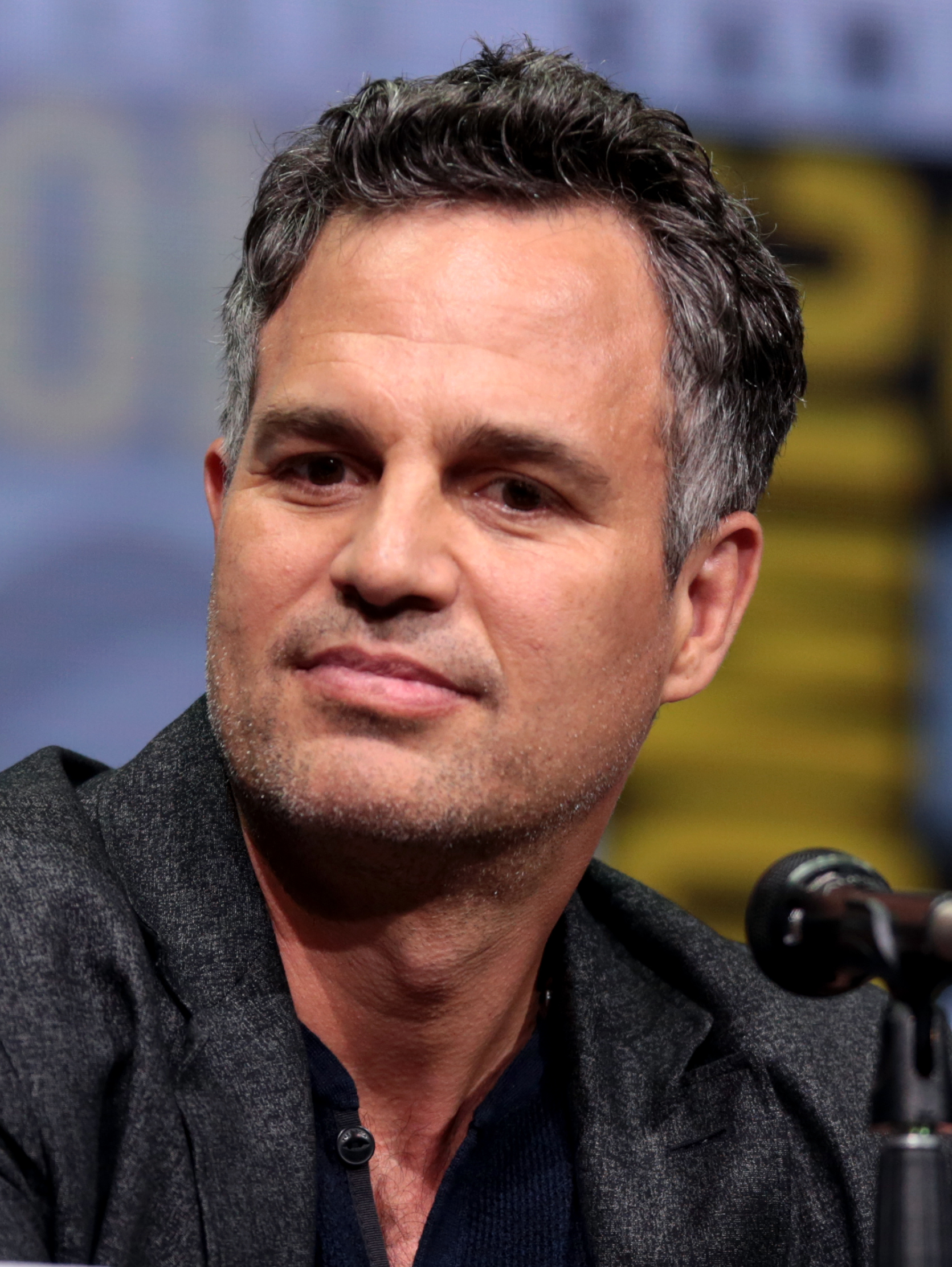
Mark Ruffalo, pictured in 2017.

- Jennifer Garner as Jenna Rink
  - Christa B. Allen as young Jenna
- Mark Ruffalo as Matty Flamhaff
  - Sean Marquette as young Matty
- Judy Greer as Lucy "Tom-Tom" Wyman
  - Alexandra Kyle as young Lucy
- Andy Serkis as Richard Kneeland
- Kathy Baker as Beverly Rink
- Samuel Ball as Alex Carlson
- Marcia DeBonis as Arlene
- Phil Reeves as Wayne Rink
- Kiersten Warren as Trish Sackett
- Jim Gaffigan as Chris Grandy
  - Alex Black as young Chris
- Lynn Collins as Wendy
- Susan Egan as Tracy Hansen
- Ashley Benson as Six Chick
- Brittany Curran as Six Chick
- Brie Larson as Six Chick
- Megan Lusk as Six Chick
- Julia Roth as Six Chick
- Renee Olstead as Becky
- Gia Mantegna as Gina

== Production ==
In October 2002, director Gary Winick was in negotiations to direct 13 Going on 30. It was also announced that Susan Arnold and Donna Arkoff Roth were producing the project with Gina Matthews. Actress Jennifer Garner was cast for the movie's lead role. In order to film the picture, Garner shot it while on break from filming her television series Alias. Gwyneth Paltrow, Hilary Swank, and Renée Zellweger were all considered for the lead role. Judy Greer was cast to play Lucy, Garner's best friend; Kathy Baker and Phil Reeves were cast as Garner's mother and father, respectively. Later, Andy Serkis was selected to play Garner's boss; while Samuel Ball was announced as Garner's boyfriend.

On May 13, 2003, it was reported that filming for the movie was underway in Los Angeles with Revolution Studios. It was filmed in Los Angeles, New York City and South Pasadena, California. Interior shots were filmed in Los Angeles. The crew moved to New York City, where they shot exteriors for 17 days. Principal photography took place from May to November 2003. Written by Josh Goldsmith and Cathy Yuspa, the script was "polished" by Niels Mueller (who lost an initial writing credit in a subsequent dispute arbitrated by the Writers Guild of America).

Co-lead Mark Ruffalo almost left the project during the rehearsals of the "Thriller scene" dance due to him hating the rehearsal process and taking a long time to perfect the choreography.

Christa B. Allen, who portrayed 13-year-old Jenna, later "reprised" her role as a younger version of Garner by portraying the teenage version of Jenny Perotti in Ghosts of Girlfriends Past (2009). In October 2016, it was announced 13 Going on 30 was going to be adapted for Broadway with an estimated debut in late 2017, but plans did not move forward.

== Music ==
=== Soundtrack ===
13 Going on 30 Soundtrack

Soundtrack album by Various Artists
- Released: April 20, 2004
- Genres: Pop; pop rock; new wave; dance-pop
- Label: Hollywood

The soundtrack to 13 Going on 30 was released on April 20, 2004, from Hollywood Records. The album mostly contains music from the 1980s with a range of hits from famous recording artists such as Talking Heads, Billy Joel, Madonna, Pat Benatar and Whitney Houston. There is also a handful of songs performed by contemporary artists, such as Lillix and Liz Phair.

1. "Head Over Heels" – The Go-Go's
2. "Jessie's Girl" – Rick Springfield
3. "What the World Needs Now Is Love" — Jackie DeShannon
4. "Burning Down the House" – Talking Heads
5. "Mad About You" – Belinda Carlisle
6. "I Wanna Dance with Somebody (Who Loves Me)" – Whitney Houston
7. "What I Like About You" – Lillix
8. "Heaven Is a Place on Earth" — Belinda Carlisle
9. "Ice Ice Baby" – Vanilla Ice
10. "Crazy for You" – Madonna
11. "Vienna" – Billy Joel
12. "Why Can't I?" – Liz Phair
13. "Nothing Compares 2 U" — Sinéad O'Connor
14. "Tainted Love" – Soft Cell
15. "Love Is a Battlefield" – Pat Benatar
16. "Will I Ever Make It Home" – Ingram Hill

=== Other songs featured in the film ===
- "Thriller" – Michael Jackson
- "Everybody Have Fun Tonight" – Wang Chung
- "Good Day" – Luce

The songs "Breathe" by Michelle Branch and "Iris" by the Goo Goo Dolls were featured in promotional trailers, but were not featured in the movie or on the soundtrack.

=== Original score ===
13 Going on 30

Film score by Theodore Shapiro
- Released: April 6, 2004
- Length: 29:46
- Label: Hollywood Records

Theodore Shapiro chronology
Starsky & Hutch (2004)	13 Going on 30 (2004)	DodgeBall: A True Underdog Story (2004)

1. "Prologue" (4:19)
2. "Jenna Dream House" (1:13)
3. "Transformation" (0:31)
4. "Wake Up" (2:03)
5. "Naked Guy" (0:36)
6. "Off to Work" (0:29)
7. "Poise" (0:43)
8. "Paper Throw" (0:28)
9. "Can I Go?" (1:05)
10. "Matt's Apt" (0:46)
11. "Fluffy Pillow" (0:49)
12. "Au Revoir" (0:44)
13. "Good Luck with Fractions" (0:35)
14. "Mean Messages" (0:25)
15. "Eavesdropping" (0:46)
16. "Yearbook Idea" (1:14)
17. "Elevator" (0:25)
18. "Swings" (01:49)
19. "Assemble the Proposal" (0:39)
20. "Hang in There" (0:38)
21. "Angry Lucy" (0:15)
22. "Presentation" (2:30)
23. "Sneaking" (0:59)
24. "Rain Montage" (1:08)
25. "Getting Married Tomorrow" (0:29)
26. "Sparkle Bus Overlay" (0:39)
27. "Dream House Revisited" (1:28)
28. "30 to 13" (0:38)
29. "Crazy for You Overlay" (1:09)

== Reception ==
=== Box office ===
The film opened on April 23, 2004, with an initial box office take of $22 million in its first weekend, debuting at number two, almost tied with Denzel Washington's thriller Man on Fire. In its second week, it dropped to number three, earning $9 million. In its third week, it fell to number five, earning $5.5 million. In its fourth week, it took sixth place with an estimated $4.2 million. In its fifth week, it fell to number seven, with an estimated $2.5 million. In its sixth week, the film fell to number 9, earning $1 million. It ended with $57 million at the domestic box office, and a total worldwide gross of $96,455,697.

=== Critical response ===
On Rotten Tomatoes, 13 Going on 30 has an approval rating of 65% based on reviews from 179 critics, with an average rating of 6.20/10. The site's critics consensus reads, "Although the plot leaves a lot to be desired, 13 Going on 30 will tug at your inner teenager's heartstrings thanks in large part to a dazzling performance from Jennifer Garner." On Metacritic, the film has a score of 57% based on reviews from 35 critics, indicating "mixed or average" reviews. Audiences surveyed by CinemaScore gave the film a grade A−, on a scale of A to F.

Owen Gleiberman of Entertainment Weekly gave the film a highly positive review with a grade of "A−", writing, "13 Going on 30 is the rare commercial comedy that leaves you entranced by what can happen only in the movies." Gleiberman also praised Garner's performance, writing: "She cuts out all traces of adult consciousness, of irony and flirtation and manipulation, reducing herself to a keen, goggle-eyed earnestness that's utterly beguiling." Mick LaSalle of the San Francisco Chronicle wrote: "The possibilities of Jenna's confusion are exploited for full comic effect. Garner, who turns out to be a charming, abandoned comedian, makes Jenna's incredulousness and innocence very funny and occasionally even touching." Joe Leydon of Variety also praised her performance, writing "Garner throws herself so fully and effectively into the role that in a few key scenes, she vividly conveys Jenna's high spirits and giddy pleasure through the graceful curling of her toes." Leydon praised director Gary Winick for "bringing a fresh spin to most of the script's cliches and emphasizing nuggets of emotional truth provided by Goldsmith and Yuspa." Wesley Morris of The Boston Globe wrote that "The film is tailor-made for women who openly lust for dream houses, dream jobs, and dream hubbies." He also wrote that "the best stuff involves the childhood preamble. (The young actors playing Jenna, Matt, and Lucy are terrific.) Those moments feel painfully, comically true."

Claudia Puig of USA Today gave the film 3 out of 4 stars, commenting, "This romantic comedy is intended as a cautionary fairy tale. The silly humor works with the film's gentle message of self-empowerment and avoids sappiness in a tender interlude where the adult Jenna returns to her childhood home. Amusing, charming, and pleasantly nostalgic, 13 Going on 30 should fall easily onto moviegoers' wish lists." Mick Martin and Marsha Porter's 2005 DVD and Video Guide called it a "shameless rip-off of the Tom Hanks' classic Big", adding that it was "weak, but predictable and is sparked by the excellent performance of Jennifer Garner".

Elvis Mitchell of The New York Times wrote: "The performances give the film more flavor and life than the situation does; it often feels like pre-chewed Bubble Yum. The message of the plot is that a lack of sophistication is the key to success, even in a fashion magazine that attracts readers through sexy exhibitionism. The movie would have shown some daring savvy if it had played more with the role-playing aspect of fashion spreads. Instead, it is content to eat its retro snack cake and have it, too." Roger Ebert of the Chicago Sun-Times gave it 2 out of 4 and wrote: "You buy the magic because it comes with the territory. What I couldn't buy was the world of the magazine office, and the awkward scenes in which high-powered professionals don't seem to notice that they're dealing with a 13-year-old mind." Andrea Gronvall of the Chicago Reader wrote that "The formula works, thanks in large part to star Jennifer Garner, who's so radiant theaters should be stocking sunblock. Underlying the shenanigans and the pop-psychology moral—self-love is a prerequisite for true love—there's a touching wistfulness about roads not taken." Jorge Morales of The Village Voice commented: "The thirty something in me was all, gag me with a spoon, but the kid in me was like, this film's rad to the max." Nell Minow of Common Sense Media rated four stars out of five saying "Touching, hilarious Jennifer Garner rom-com."

=== Accolades ===
The film received several nominations at the Teen Choice Awards, including a nomination for Garner. The musical performance of Garner and Ruffalo was nominated for an MTV Movie Award.

== Home media ==
The DVD was re-released in 2006 with the subtitle The Fun and Flirty Edition with special packaging and different special features. The Blu-ray version of 13 Going on 30 was released on January 20, 2009.

== Remake ==
In March 2026, a remake based on the film from Netflix was announced. The remake will be written by Hannah Marks and Flora Greeson, and directed by Brett Haley with Emily Bader and Logan Lerman set to star and Garner to executive produce. In June 2026, it was announced Adeline Rudolph joined the cast. In July 2026, Jessica Alba, Taylor Ortega, Tim Meadows and Dan Bucatinsky joined the cast. Later, original cast members Garner and Judy Greer were spotted filming cameo appearances alongside Bader on the Santa Monica set of the Netflix remake, followed by the official casting of Taylor Zakhar Perez, Owen Thiele, Nasim Pedrad, Supriya Ganesh, Myra Molloy, Charley McCain, Henry Samiri, Audrina Miranda and Kai Zen.

== Stage adaptation ==
On 28 September 2023, a UK stage adaptation of the film was announced. The show held several public workshop performances at Battersea Arts Centre in London, ahead of a full production opening in the summer of 2025. The stage production is written by movie writers Josh Goldsmith and Cathy Yuspa and music is by composer/lyricists Alan Zachary and Michael Weiner. Casting for the workshops was announced on 12 October 2023, with Lucie Jones playing Jenna Rink, Jamie Muscato playing Matt Flamhaff, and Grace Mouat playing Lucy Wyman, with Andy Fickman set to direct.

On 29 October 2024 it was announced that the stage adaptation would make its world premiere at the Manchester Opera House from 21 September 2025 through 12 October 2025. The producers for the show include ROYO, Revolution Studios, Wendy Federman, and Phil Kenny.
