= Jake 2.0 =

American science fiction television series

- Genre: Science fiction; Action; Drama
- Created by: Silvio Horta
- Starring: Christopher Gorham; Philip Anthony-Rodriguez; Judith Scott; Marina Black; Keegan Connor Tracy
- Country of origin: United States
- Original language: English
- No. of seasons: 1
- No. of episodes: 16

Production
- Executive producers: David Greenwalt; Silvio Horta; Gina Matthews; Grant Scharbo
- Production locations: Toronto, Ontario (pilot); Vancouver, British Columbia
- Running time: 42 minutes
- Production companies: Viacom Productions; David Greenwalt Productions; Matthews/Scharbo Productions; Roundtable Entertainment; Silent H Productions

Original release
- Network: UPN
- Release: September 10, 2003 – February 6, 2004

Jake 2.0 is an American science fiction television series created by Silvio Horta that premiered on UPN on September 10, 2003. The series was canceled on January 14, 2004, due to low ratings, leaving four episodes unaired in the United States. In the United Kingdom, all the episodes aired on Sky One. The series later aired in syndication on HDNet and the Sci Fi Channel. It was filmed in Toronto and Vancouver, Canada.

The series revolves around a computer expert, Jake Foley, who works for the U.S. government's National Security Agency (NSA) and was accidentally infected by nanobots which give him superhuman powers. He can control technology with his brain, making him "the ultimate human upgrade", according to the show's introduction.

== Cast ==
=== Main ===
- Christopher Gorham as Jake Foley
- Philip Anthony-Rodriguez as Kyle Duarte
- Judith Scott as Deputy Director Louise "Lou" Beckett
- Marina Black as Sarah Carter
- Keegan Connor Tracy as Diane Hughes (doctor)

=== Recurring ===
- Miranda Frigon as Tech Agent Susan Carver
- Rachel Hayward as Executive Director Valerie Warner
- Grace Park as Fran Yoshida (Dr. Hughes' assistant)
- Kurt Evans as Tech Agent Hart
- Jesse Cadotte as DuMont
- Jim Byrnes as Chief Director Skerritt

== Episodes ==
No.	Title	Directed by	Written by	Original release date
1	"The Tech"	Robert Lieberman	Silvio Horta	September 10, 2003
Jake Foley, providing tech support on an NSA laboratory computer, is accidentally infected with nanobots. The next day he begins discovering the new powers the "nanites" have given him – the wound he received has already healed; while fixing his friend Sarah's computer, he notices he can see the tiny computer pieces in high detail and expresses technopathy; walking in the park, he is alarmed by the sound of a far-off Game Boy, and throws a football hard enough to send a boy flying into a tree. He steals files from the NSA lab and discovers the nature of the nanites. After escaping capture at the NSA building, he meets with Sarah, who is later kidnapped by a man wanting the nanobot project. As Jake confronts the enemy, he manages to tap into a nearby nitrogen tank's computer and freeze him. Back at the NSA, Jake is offered a deal to be the focus of a special team and is made a special agent.
2	"Training Day"	David Greenwalt	David Greenwalt & Grant Scharbo	September 17, 2003
While struggling to master his training as an agent, Jake's superiors begin to question his competency, and mention Jake might be locked up for "research" if results are not soon yielded. Jake is instructed to stop Sarah's inquiry into money being routed to the NSA, and is mildly successful, revealing she has a "source". Meanwhile, an electromagnetic bomb is stolen and the NSA scrambles to recover it. While all agents are out chasing false trails, Jake discovers the bomb is inside the building and scuffles with the man responsible. Although mildly affected by some of the blast that he contained in a vault, he comes out victorious and is congratulated by the rest of the team.
3	"Cater Waiter"	Harry Winer	Silvio Horta	September 24, 2003
Jake goes undercover as a catering waiter at the Chinese Embassy to support senior-agent Kyle Duarte's mission to recover stolen tank plans, he is to help reprogramming the surveillance cameras. However, a double agent, who just happens to have a past with Kyle, betrays them and Jake must find a way to get himself and Kyle out alive.
4	"Arms and the Girl"	Milan Cheylov	Mark Wilding	October 1, 2003
Jake is assigned to watch an arms dealer's daughter, a restoration artist, because the man is a suspect in a case involving a specialized explosive. He ends up meeting the woman by accident and becoming friends with her. After her father is supposedly gunned down, however, Jake concludes the woman is only using him and running the "family business" herself, as he finds her father had actually died earlier in an airline crash.
5	"The Good, the Bad, and the Geeky"	David Barrett	Javier Grillo-Marxuach	October 8, 2003
A hacker named DuMont steals two million dollars from the Federal Reserve System but is subsequently tracked down and stopped by Jake and the others. It is discovered DuMont was to meet four other hackers overseas, and Jake convinces his superiors to let him go in his place. There, Jake must find a way to stop the hackers' plans to digitally hijack a passenger jet.
6	"Last Man Standing"	David Barrett	Grant Scharbo & Gina Matthews	October 15, 2003
Jake gets leave to attend a friend's wedding, despite concern about the condition of the nanobots inside of him. He finds himself dateless, but his friend and doctor from the NSA, Diane, flies out to be with him. During the celebrations, Jake begins to become very ill – he believes a man is out to kill him and steal the nanites. Diane tries to stop the faulty-programmed nanites and convince Jake all of his concerns are imaginary, and ultimately, completely reboots the nanites in a risky shot to save him.
7	"Jerry 2.0"	Leslie Libman	Dave Johnson	October 29, 2003
A dangerous bomb is placed in a subway, but Jake captures the man responsible. The man is the son of a militia leader who becomes set on exacting revenge on Jake himself. Jake's younger brother Jerry has come to visit him, but in a mix-up becomes captured by the militia. In desperation to rescue his brother, Jake goes against orders and helps the leader's son escape from the NSA. The trade-off is eventually busted by the NSA and Jake's superiors subsequently cover for his actions.
8	"Middleman"	Michael Grossman	Jesse Stern	November 5, 2003
The NSA taps into a highly-encrypted call in Polish and determine someone is trying to get a piece of the nanite-project. However, when they take measures to protect Jake, it quickly becomes apparent that he is not the target, deduce the man Diane is dating is going to kidnap her – the person who knows the nanites best. Also in this episode, Jake reveals his actual NSA involvement to Sarah, who believes he is lying.
9	"Whiskey-Tango-Foxtrot"	Allan Kroeker	Javier Grillo-Marxuach	November 12, 2003
A nuclear weapon is stolen from a military base, and the NSA suspects someone at the base has turned traitor. Jake and Kyle are sent in undercover, Kyle as a military officer and Jake as a new recruit for the "Wolf Pack", a non-conventional group of assassins. Jake struggles to gain acceptance, but eventually wins the others over. However, after Kyle discovers one of the Wolf Pack is a traitor, he is overtaken, and it is revealed the entire group is corrupt. Jake is forced to shoot Kyle to keep up appearances, but manages to get a message to the NSA, who arrive in time to stop the Wolf Pack from transporting the bomb off-base.
10	"The Spy Who Really Liked Me"	David Straiton	Mark Wilding	November 19, 2003
An emergency inquiry board is called, and the team must relate the investigation of a classified biological weapon's theft: When it's thought the people responsible have been caught, Jake finds himself hooking up with a woman in a bar, encouraged by the discovery the nanites are not able to be passed via sexual intercourse. But Jake later discovers the woman going through his laptop and realizes she is the true thief, the two scuffle, and the woman escapes. Jake manages to catch her again, but she tells him how rebels killed her family and her plan to get revenge. However, the woman's fake deal with the rebels goes sour, and the NSA closes in, handing over the woman to the rebels. As the inquiry closes, Jake bursts out his anger over the deal with the rebels, and finally threatens to send out a copy of the inquiry's transcription. The team is let go, but one of the board members expresses to another she wishes to control Jake for herself.
11	"Prince and the Revolution"	Jorge Montesi	Dave Johnson	December 10, 2003
Jake is offered a chance by the others to leave his life as an agent by using a man who fakes people's deaths. While he thinks it over, he is deployed to guard a college student whose father is the king of a country in the midst of civil war. Although the prince's girlfriend discovers Jake passing off a memory card of the information from his laptop, he redeems himself by saving the prince from an assassin at a party. The prince's father is assassinated, and Jake is recalled to headquarters, where he is told the government is no longer going to help the prince's side. Nevertheless, Jake uses his "out" to let the prince and his girlfriend escape. In a twist, it is revealed the girlfriend is an assassin as well. However, the girl turns out not really wanting to kill the prince, and the two go back to their home country to sort things out.
12	"Double Agent"	David Barrett	David Greenwalt & Silvio Horta	December 17, 2003
After a former KGB agent-turned-terrorist eludes surveillance, Jake convinces his superiors to call Richard Fox (Lee Majors), a legendary ex-spy who was the point man in dealing with her during the Cold War, out of retirement. Jake accompanies Fox to Atlantic City in search of a Soviet sleeper agent, but once there Fox behaves erratically, setting Jake up and kidnapping a cocktail waitress, whom he delivers to the terrorist. When Jake gets back to headquarters, though, he encounters Fox, who claims that the man that they were working with was an imposter and reveals that the waitress was a scientist who could help the terrorists build a dirty bomb. As the NSA races to locate the device, Jake discovers the truth – that Fox was both men, suffering from a split personality due to the years of stress as an agent. With Jake's help, Fox pulls himself together and leads the NSA to the terrorists.
13	"Blackout"	Milan Cheylov	Jesse Stern	January 16, 2004
Jake manages to contain a computer virus that has infected the NSA's system, and goes to confront its apparent designer, DuMont. DuMont convinces the authorities to take him to his secret storage area, saying his girlfriend must have sold the virus to someone else. Inside the room, DuMont has his girlfriend activate a device that knocks Jake unconscious so that they may kidnap him. An amnesiac Jake is told DuMont's girlfriend is his wife and a number of other things, while DuMont tries to find a way to give himself some of Jake's nanites. However, Jake notices a number of discrepancies in his supposed life. After a brief fight, Jake is chased into the woods as the NSA finally shows up, but the confused Jake is convinced they are up to no good and runs away from them. The NSA is forced to issue an APB with deadly force authorization on him.
14	"Get Foley"	Adam Davidson	Javier Grillo-Marxuach	January 23, 2004
Still suffering from amnesia, Jake continues to run from the NSA, who are mostly convinced he has turned rogue. Stumbling upon a fight club, Jake ends up entering and impressing the leader with his skills (in both fighting and working with computers). Due to her distress at the NSA's position, Diane is put on leave, but manages to pinpoint Jake's location. She goes to find him, and although she begins to win his trust, he does discover she is NSA and goes off to help the club's leader commit a large robbery. However, he ends up purposefully muddling the robbery and turning himself in. Back at the lab, Diane gives him an injection that finally helps him restore his memories.
15	"Dead Man Talking"	Leslie Libman	Mark Wilding	January 30, 2004
Alex Brandt, an agent whom Lou believed to have died years ago is found alive. This is a man with whom she has a past and who she was forced to leave behind on a mission. He and his wife both blamed Lou for his death. Meanwhile the nanite project may potentially have a new member.
16	"Upgrade"	Stephen Miner	David Greenwalt & Silvio Horta	February 6, 2004
Jake is assigned to protect Dr. Nanda Sang – a Nobel Prize–winning activist and diplomat – who is targeted by the Junshi clan of assassins. However, for a man of peace, the Nelson Mandela of East Asia isn't quite what they're expecting, particularly Diane, who sees him as a hero. Meanwhile, Warner pays DuMont a visit. The assassin who was assigned to kill Dr. Sang has regrets and fails to kill him. Jake upgrades his nanites to version 3.0, against Diane's orders, in order to improve his image recollection of the failed attack. Jake and the assassin, Shinji Makito, become friends, and they work together to try to stop the second assassin, Yuki Makito, Shinji's sister.

The final four episodes premiered on Sky1 in the UK.

Three more episodes were originally planned before the series was canceled. They were as follows:

- "The Fix"
- "Libra"
- "Nano-A-Nano"

Javier Grillo-Marxuach, a writer on the series, announced that the first of these had been scripted at the time of cancellation, with the other two outlined to conclude this final story arc. The plot outline can be found in a fansite interview.

== Home media ==
Visual Entertainment Inc. (under license from CBS) released Jake 2.0 on DVD on May 3, 2019.

== See also ==
- Chuck
- Intelligence
- Max Steel
- The Six Million Dollar Man
- Joe 90
