= The Mountain (TV series) =

American drama television series

- Genre: Drama
- Created by: David Barrett; Gina Matthews; Grant Scharbo
- Starring: Anson Mount; Oliver Hudson; Tara Thompson; Penn Badgley; Elizabeth Bogush; Alana de la Garza; Tommy Dewey; Johann Urb; Mitch Pileggi; Barbara Hershey
- Opening theme: "I Miss You" by Blink-182
- Country of origin: United States
- Original language: English
- No. of seasons: 1
- No. of episodes: 13

Production
- Executive producers: Shaun Cassidy; McG; Stephanie Savage
- Running time: 43 minutes
- Production companies: Wonderland Sound and Vision; Shaun Cassidy Productions; Warner Bros. Television

Original release
- Network: The WB
- Release: September 22, 2004 – January 2, 2005

The Mountain is an American drama television series created by David Barrett, Gina Matthews and Grant Scharbo, that was broadcast on The WB network for one season from September 22, 2004 to January 2, 2005. The show received very low ratings and was canceled after only thirteen episodes.

== Plot ==
The plot centers on a ski resort run by Will Carver (Anson Mount). When his grandfather dies, Will discovers that the resort has been left to his younger brother David (Oliver Hudson), an irresponsible layabout who returns to pick up the reins. There is familial conflict over the resort and over Maria (Alana de la Garza), a woman who previously dated David, but then dates Will. Additional conflict comes from the efforts of land developer Colin Dowling (Mitch Pileggi) and his attractive daughter, Max (Elizabeth Bogush), who falls for David.

== Cast and characters ==
=== Main ===
- Oliver Hudson as David Carver Jr.
- Anson Mount as Will Carver
- Tara Thompson as Shelley Carver
- Penn Badgley as Sam Tunney
- Elizabeth Bogush as Max Dowling
- Alana de la Garza as Maria Serrano
- Tommy Dewey as Michael Dowling
- Johann Urb as Travis Thorson
- Mitch Pileggi as Colin Dowling
- Barbara Hershey as Gennie Carver

=== Recurring ===
- Kaylee DeFer as Scarlett
- Matt Bellefleur as Fergie
- Sam Easton as Blake
- Brett Cullen as John 'Whit' Whitman
- Martin Cummins as Eric Toth

=== Guest star ===
- Chad Everett as David Carver Sr. (episode: Pilot)

== Episodes ==
| No. | Title | Directed by | Written by | Original release date | Prod. code |
|---|---|---|---|---|---|
| 1 | "Pilot" | David Barrett | Story by : Gina Matthews & Grant Scharbo and David Barrett; Teleplay by : Stephanie Savage and Shaun Cassidy | September 22, 2004 | 2T5350 |
| 2 | "Unbroken" | Rod Hardy | Shaun Cassidy | September 29, 2004 | 2T5351 |
| 3 | "On The Beach" | Sandy Smolan | Stephanie Savage | October 6, 2004 | 2T5352 |
| 4 | "Water" | Rod Hardy | Michael Nankin | October 13, 2004 | 2T5353 |
| 5 | "Masquerade" | Sandy Smolan | Jesse Stern | October 20, 2004 | 2T5354 |
| 6 | "Best Laid Plans" | J. Miller Tobin | Laurie Arent | October 31, 2004 | 2T5355 |
| 7 | "The Letter" | Harry Winer | Karen Barna | November 14, 2004 | 2T5356 |
| 8 | "A Piece of the Rock" | Peter Markle | Jeremy Miller and Dan Cohn | November 21, 2004 | 2T5357 |
| 9 | "Pop Psychology" | Peter Ellis | Jesse Stern | November 28, 2004 | 2T5358 |
| 10 | "The One You're With" | Michael Nankin | Jean Desegonzac | December 5, 2004 | 2T5359 |
| 11 | "Sacred Things" | J. Miller Tobin | Laurie Arent | December 12, 2004 | 2T5360 |
| 12 | "Blood Money" | Lev Spiro | Jesse Stern | December 26, 2004 | 2T5361 |
| 13 | "Great Expectations" | Harry Winer | Karen Barna | January 2, 2005 | 2T5362 |
