= Daniella Evangelista =

Canadian actress and model

- Born: September 20, 1982 (age 43); Vancouver, British Columbia, Canada
- Occupations: Actress, model
- Years active: 1994–present

Daniella Evangelista (born September 20, 1982) is a Canadian actress and model.

== Biography ==
Her early work in television commercials and modeling included national campaigns for Benetton and worldwide exposure through Japanese calendars and other promotions. She was also profiled on the front of the popular Italian teen magazine "Bambini".

She was a coprotagonist on teen drama Edgemont as Tracy Antonelli from 2001 to 2005 and voices Kana in Hamtaro and Asuka Sakurai in the animated series Soultaker in 2002.

In 2000, she appeared in the beginning of Cabin by the Lake, a made for television horror/thriller movie starring Judd Nelson. She portrayed the character "Kimberley Parsons" who was kidnapped and later murdered. She was credited in the sequel, Return to Cabin by the Lake in 2001.

In 2003, she appeared in Nickelback's music video "Someday".

== Filmography ==
=== Film ===
Year	Title	Role	Notes
1995	The Amazing Panda Adventure	Classmate	Uncredited
1998	Disturbing Behavior	Daniella	
1998	The Falling	Bubble Girl	
1998	The Process	Katie	
1999	A Twist of Faith	Kristi	
2001	Ripper	Mary-Anne Nordstrom	
2001	Wishmaster 3: Beyond the Gates of Hell	Anne	
2002	The Mangler 2	Emily Stone	
2002	Try Seventeen	Girlfriend	
2003	National Lampoon's Barely Legal	Wendy	
2003	Scorched	Jewels	
2003	How It All Went Down	Stella	
2008	Kill Switch	Barmaid	
2009	Alien Trespass	Greasers Girlfriend	
2010	ODC [Ordinary Decent Criminal]	Angelina Lynch	
2010	Frankie & Alice	Maria	Uncredited
2010	Guido Superstar: The Rise of Guido	Eva	
2011	Thank You	Secretary	Uncredited
2013	Lucille's Ball	Sharlene	
2013	Pacific Rim	Cadet	Uncredited

=== Television ===
Year	Title	Role	Notes
1994	The Myra Johnson Mystery	Little Sister	Television film
1995	Brothers' Destiny	Pretty Girl	Television film
1996	Madison	Lulu	Episode: "Go Your Own Way"
1999	Don't Look Behind You	Blair	Television film
1999	The Outer Limits	Cindy Parker	Episode: "Stranded"
1999	First Wave	Laura Bennett	Episode: "Normal, Illinois"
1999–2000	Infinite Ryvius	Elina Rigby	11 episodes
1999, 2002	Cold Squad	Jackie / Victim #1	2 episodes
2000	Cabin by the Lake	Kimberly	Television film
2000	Secret Agent Man	Megan	Episode: "Back to School"
2000	The Theory of Everything	Sandra	Television film
2001	The SoulTaker	Asuka Sakurai	3 episodes
2001	Return to Cabin by the Lake	Kimberly Parsons	Television film
2001	Special Unit 2	Teen Girl	Episode: "The Wall"
2001–2005	Edgemont	Tracy Antonelli	67 episodes
2002	Much Ado About Whatever	Melinda	Episode: "Sausage Factory"
2002	The Twilight Zone	Prostitute	Episode: "To Protect and Serve"
2002	Just Cause	Privett Receptionist	Episode: "Making News"
2003	Wilder Days	Distraught Guest	Television film
2003, 2004	Alienated	Julie McBride	2 episodes
2005	The 4400	Karen	2 episodes
2006	The Collector	Ashley Merrin	Episode: "The Vampire"
2006	Stargate SG-1	Denya	Episode: "Crusade"
2006	Engaged to Kill	Sally	Television film
2007	The L Word	Rebecca	Episode: "Lacy Lilting Lyrics"
2007	Blood Ties	Cassis	Episode: "Heart of Fire"
2007	Supernatural	Hanging Vampire #1	Episode: "Fresh Blood"
2013	Warehouse 13	Anna	Episode: "Runaway"
2014	Rush	Groupie #1	Episode: "Because I Got High"
2015	Her Infidelity	Rose Kendall	Television film
2016	The Irresistible Blueberry Farm	DJ	Television film
2016, 2017	The Magicians	Fillorian Mother	2 episodes
2021	Vice Squad: New Orleans	Det. Darian Champlain	2 episodes
2022	Realm of the Waterfall	Warrior Princess Wysaphina	Episode: "Wysaphina"
