= Annie Clark (actress) =

Canadian actress (born 1992)

- Born: Andrea Jeanette Clark; June 4, 1992 (age 34); Toronto, Ontario, Canada
- Education: University of Toronto
- Occupation: Actress
- Years active: 2008–present
- Spouse: Luke Karaim (m. 2024)
- Children: 1

Andrea Jeanette Clark (born June 4, 1992) is a Canadian actress. She is best known for portraying Fiona Coyne on Degrassi: The Next Generation.

== Career ==
Clark joined Degrassi: The Next Generation in 2009, playing the role of Fiona Coyne, a lesbian teenage socalite struggling with alcoholism. She continued to play Fiona on the show through 2013. Clark's portrayal of Coyne would help earn the show a GLAAD Media Award nomination in 2013. Clark was praised by fans, becoming a series favorite, for her portrayals of storylines involving abusive relationships, coming out, and alcoholism.

In 2013, she starred in the Canadian thriller film Solo as Gillian, a reluctant camp counsellor with a troubled past. In 2014 Clark co-starred in the movie Teen Lust, playing Denise the prospective girlfriend of the lead character Neil (Jesse Carere).

In 2021, she starred in the Lifetime romantic comedy film Ghosts of Christmas Past.

== Personal life ==
Following the end of Degrassi filming in 2012, Clark enrolled in the University of Toronto. She pursued several disciplines, with breaks in between due to filming. In 2020, she decided to move to Los Angeles, putting university on hold. When the pandemic began, she returned home to Toronto and enrolled again. She graduated in 2022 with a degree in American studies. She married Luke Karaim in May 2024. In August 2024, she announced via Instagram that she was expecting her first child. Clark gave birth to a son, Bennett Peter Karaim, on January 24, 2025.

== Filmography ==
=== Film ===
Year	Title	Role	Notes
2013	Solo	Gillian	
2014	Teen Lust	Denise	
2018	The New Romantic	Claire	Uncredited
2019	Father by Law	Liz	Short film
2021	Ghosts of Christmas Past	Ellie	

=== Television ===
Year	Title	Role	Notes
2008	Roxy Hunter and the Secret of the Shaman	Teenager	Television movie
2009	The Listener	Girl in Bed	Episode: "Inside the Man"; uncredited
2009	How to be Indie	Forest Greenwood	Episode: "How to Get on Carlos Martinelli's Capital 'L' List, and Live"
2009–2013	Degrassi: The Next Generation	Fiona Coyne	Main role (seasons 9–12)
2010	Degrassi Takes Manhattan	Fiona Coyne	Television movie
2010–2013	Degrassi: Minis	Fiona Coyne	6 episodes
2014	Not With My Daughter	Abby Eco	Television movie; also known as Client Seduction
2017	Semi-Famous	Rosie Wayy-Patrick	Episode: "Star Power"
2018	TMI Crossing the Threshold	Jan Chapman	Unsold television pilot
2021	Ghosts of Christmas Past	Ellie Sanders	Television movie
2023	Love Hacks	Sam Caldwell	Television movie
2023	A Royal Recipe for Love	Alexandra Batcher	Television movie
2025	Ginny & Georgia	Anna	
