= Mr. Rock 'n' Roll: The Alan Freed Story =

- Based on: Big Beat Heat: Alan Freed and the Early Years of Rock & Roll by John A. Jackson
- Screenplay by: Matt Dorff
- Directed by: Andy Wolk
- Starring: Judd Nelson
- Theme music composer: Lawrence Shragge
- Country of origin: United States
- Original language: English

Production
- Executive producers: Matt Dorff; Robert M. Sertner; Frank von Zerneck; Andy Wolk
- Producers: Richard D. Arredondo; Randy Sutter
- Production location: Toronto
- Cinematography: Derick V. Underschultz
- Editor: Mark Conte
- Running time: 120 minutes
- Production company: Von Zerneck Sertner Films

Original release
- Network: NBC
- Release: October 31, 1999

Mr. Rock 'n' Roll: The Alan Freed Story is a 1999 American television film directed by Andy Wolk and starring Judd Nelson as Alan Freed. It is based on John A. Jackson's book Big Beat Heat: Alan Freed and the Early Years of Rock & Roll. The film premiered on NBC on October 31, 1999.

== Cast ==
- Judd Nelson as Alan Freed
- Mädchen Amick as Jackie McCoy
- David Gianopoulos as Morris Levy
- Daniel Kash as Hooke
- Leon Robinson as Jackie Wilson
- Paula Abdul as Denise Walton
- Fabian Forte
- Bobby Rydell
- James C. Victor as Jerry Lee Lewis
- Walter Franks as Little Richard
- Joe Warren Davis as Buddy Holly
- Michael Dunston as Bo Diddley
- LeRoy D. Brazile as Frankie Lymon
- Fulvio Cecere as Pete Bell
- Mark Wilson as Leo Mintz
- Richard Fitzpatrick as VP Programming
- Aron Tager as J. Edgar Hoover
- Reg Dreger as Police Captain
- Bruce Hunter as Head Parent Shaw
- Emidio Michetti as Director
- Egidio Tari as FBI Agent
- Robert Thomas as Bouncer
- David Crean as Surgeon
- Brittney Whalen as Siggy

== Production ==
The film was shot in Toronto.
