= Merle Nelson =

American politician (born 1935)

Member of the Maine House of Representatives
- In office 1977–1986

Personal details
- Born: Merle Royte; May 8, 1935 (age 91) Portland, Maine, U.S.
- Party: Democratic
- Spouse: Leonard Nelson
- Children: 3, including Judd Nelson
- Education: Lesley College (B.A.); Harvard University (M.A.)
- Profession: Court mediator

Merle Nelson (née Royte; born May 8, 1935) is an American politician and court mediator.

== Early life and education ==
Nelson, of Jewish ancestry, was born and raised in Portland, Maine. She graduated from Deering High School in 1953. She earned a teaching degree from Lesley College in Cambridge, Massachusetts. She began teaching and earned a M.A. from Harvard University.

== Political career ==
A Democrat, she served five terms in the Maine House of Representatives from 1977 to 1986. In 1977, while a first-term legislator, Nelson testified to the Subcommittee on Employment, Poverty, and Migratory Labor of the United States Congress on behalf of the Displaced Homemakers Act. Nelson played a leading role in helping establish Seeds of Peace international summer camp in Otisfield, Maine. In 2005, Governor John Baldacci nominated her to the board of trustees of the Maine Community College System. The Maine Centers for Women, Work, and Community's Merle Nelson Making a Difference award is named in her honor.

== Family ==
She is married to a fellow Harvard alumnus Leonard Nelson, a Portland-based corporate attorney. They live in Falmouth Foreside, Maine. One of their children, Judd Nelson (born 1959), is a well-known television and film actor.
