= Emmanuelle Vaugier =

Canadian actress

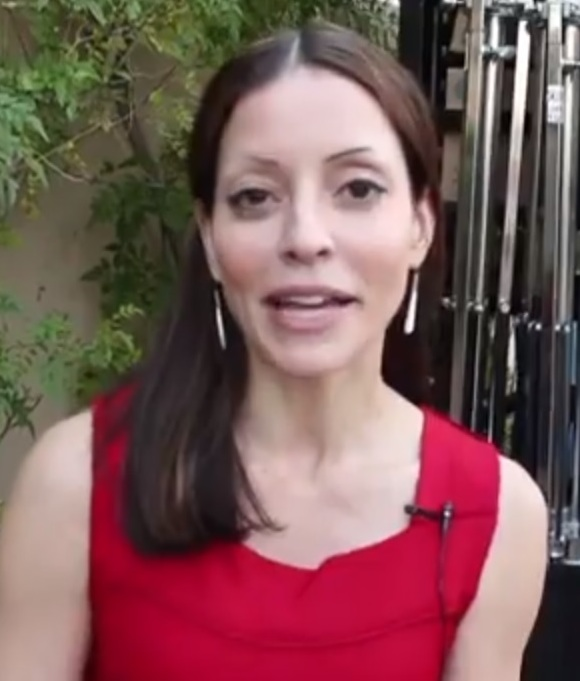
- Born: Emmanuelle Frederique Vaugier; June 23, 1976 (age 50); Vancouver, British Columbia, Canada
- Occupation: Actress
- Years active: 1995–present
- Website: emmanuellevaugier.com

Emmanuelle Frederique Vaugier (/voʊʒiˈeɪ/, voh-zhee-AY; born June 23, 1976) is a Canadian film and television actress. Vaugier has had recurring roles as Detective Jessica Angell on CSI: NY, Mia on Two and a Half Men, Dr. Helen Bryce on Smallville, FBI Special Agent Emma Barnes on Human Target, and as The Morrigan on Lost Girl. In feature films, Vaugier appeared, albeit in a minor role, alongside Michael Caine and Robert Duvall in Secondhand Lions. She starred as Addison in Saw II, reprising her role in Saw IV, and had a supporting part in the Josh Hartnett film 40 Days and 40 Nights.

== Early life ==
Vaugier was born in Vancouver, the daughter of French immigrants. She grew up in a Roman Catholic, French-speaking household. She attended Crofton House School, a girls private school, for 10 years until she transferred to Magee Secondary School, which offers a flexible academic program for professional and pre-professional student athletes, artists and musicians (SPARTS), for the last two years of high school. She has an older brother, Jason.

== Career ==
=== Television ===
Vaugier played the role of young upstart Maria Alcobar in a 1995 episode of Highlander: The Series. In 2004, she played Lindsey Kellogg on the short-lived Fox Television series North Shore. She has also had guest-star spots on Veronica Mars, Supernatural, The Outer Limits, Higher Ground, Andromeda, Smallville, and Charmed. She also appeared in the Emmy Award nominated miniseries The Beach Boys: An American Family where she portrayed Mike Love’s wife, Suzanne. Vaugier also completed a starring role in MOW Veiled Truth for the Lifetime Network. She is also known for her role during the first two seasons of One Tree Hill, as Nicki, Jake's (Bryan Greenberg) ex-girlfriend and mother to their child, Jenny.

From 2005–2015, Vaugier guest starred in twelve episodes of CBS's hit sitcom Two and a Half Men as Mia, a ballet teacher with whom Charlie Harper fell in love with and almost married. In 2005, she also played the title character in the Painkiller Jane television movie for the Sci Fi Channel. She first became noticed by the science fiction community when she portrayed Dr. Helen Bryce, the love interest of Lex Luthor, on the WB drama Smallville in 2002–2003. Vaugier had a recurring role from 2006–2009 on the CBS show CSI: NY as Detective Jessica Angell. She left the show after the fifth season due to budget cuts.

Vaugier appeared in two episodes of the Fox series Human Target as FBI agent Emma Barnes, who is first introduced to the show on January 26, 2010, in the episode "Embassy Row". Vaugier also had a recurring role on the Syfy series Lost Girl as The Morrigan, the leader of the Dark Fae.

=== Film ===
Vaugier appeared as Addison in Saw II and Saw IV. In the Canadian film Unearthed, she played Annie, the sheriff of a small rural desert town. She appeared in the film 40 Days and 40 Nights, which starred Josh Hartnett. She had starring roles in Suddenly Naked, in which she plays a Latin pop sensation; the TV-movie Mindstorm, a science-fiction thriller; and Ripper, a psychological thriller about students who mysteriously disappear after enrolling in a class about serial killers. She stars also in the sequel to Mirrors, which is directed by Víctor Garcia. Maxim magazine featured her on the cover of the February 2006 issue in the United States. Three months later, she landed spot #31 on their annual Hot 100 list.

=== Video games ===
Vaugier appeared in Need for Speed: Carbon (2006) as Nikki. She is the girlfriend of the antagonist Darius in the game and love interest of the player character.

== Personal life ==
Vaugier was in a two-year relationship with Chuck Lorre, which ended in 2012.

== Filmography ==
=== Film ===
Year	Title	Role	Notes
1995	A Family Divided	Rosalie Frank	TV movie
1996	The Halfback of Notre Dame	Esmerelda	TV movie
1996	Home Song	Cheerleader	TV movie
1996	The Limbic Region	Jennifer Lucca - age 21	TV movie
1997	Hysteria	Veronica Bloom	
1999	The Fear: Resurrection	Jennifer	
1999	Assault on Death Mountain	French Woman	TV movie
1999	Shapeshifter	Anika	
2000	My 5 Wives	Sarah	
2000	The Sculptress	Sylvie	
2001	Largo Winch: The Heir	Nikki	TV movie
2001	Mindstorm	Tracy Wellman	
2001	Return to Cabin by the Lake	Vicki	TV movie
2001	Suddenly Naked	Lupe Martinez	
2001	Ripper	Andrea "Andy" Carter	
2001	Wishmaster 3: Beyond the Gates of Hell	Elinor Smith	Video
2002	40 Days and 40 Nights	Susie	
2003	Secondhand Lions	Jasmine	
2003	Water's Edge	Rae Butler	
2004	Call Me: The Rise and Fall of Heidi Fleiss	Lauren	TV movie
2005	House of the Dead 2	Dr. Alexandra "Nightingale" Morgan	
2005	Saw II	Addison Corday	
2005	Painkiller Jane	Captain Jane Elizabeth Browning	TV movie
2005	Cerberus	Dr. Samantha Gaines	TV movie
2006	Veiled Truth	Carolyn	TV movie
2007	Unearthed	Sheriff Annie Flynn	
2007	Saw IV	Addison Corday	
2008	Blonde and Blonder	Cat	
2008	Bachelor Party 2: The Last Temptation	Eva	Video
2008	Far Cry	Valerie Cardinal	
2009	Reverse Angle	Eve Pretson	TV movie
2009	Dolan's Cadillac	Elizabeth Robinson	
2010	A Trace of Danger	Kate	TV movie
2010	Mirrors 2	Elizabeth Reigns	Video
2010	Hysteria	Jennifer	
2010	A Nanny for Christmas	Ally Leeds	TV movie
2011	Where the Road Meets the Sun	Lisa	
2011	Killer Mountain	Kate	TV movie
2011	French Immersion	Jennifer Yates	
2011	Intervention: Cinderella	Evil Stepmother	Short
2012	Stolen Child	Amanda	TV movie
2012	It's Christmas, Carol!	Carol Huffman	TV movie
2013	The Wedding Chapel	Sarah Robertson	
2013	Susie's Hope	Donna Smith Lawrence	
2013	Ivanov Red, White, and Blue	Kara	Short
2013	Absolute Deception	Rebecca Scott	
2013	Hidden Away	Alexandra Cole/Stephanie Bennett	TV movie
2013	Clara's Deadly Secret	Helen	TV movie
2014	Saul: The Journey to Damascus	Mary Magdalene	
2014	Teen Lust	Shelley	
2015	My Stepdaughter	Jill	
2016	Love In Paradise	Heather Twain	TV movie
2016	Love in the Vineyard	Molly	TV movie
2016	Stranger in the House	Jade	TV movie
2016	His Double Life	Linda	TV movie
2017	Washed Away	Gabrielle	TV movie
2017	Destruction: Los Angeles	Margot Taylor	
2018	Killer Ending	Agatha Sayers	TV movie
2019	My Mother's Stalker	Bethany	
2020	Expectant	Genevieve Parker	
2020	Eat Wheaties!	Sarah Getz	
2021	Psycho Intern	Maya	TV movie
2022	Big Sky River	Tara Kendall	TV movie
2023	Big Sky River: The Bridal Path	Tara Kendall	TV movie

=== Television ===
Year	Title	Role	Notes
1995	Highlander: The Series	Maria Alcobar	Episode: "Chivalry"
1996	Madison	Noella D'Angelo	Recurring Cast: Season 4
1997	Breaker High	Monette	Episode: "Chateau L'Feet J'mae"
1997	Police Academy: The Series	Sally	Episode: "Put Down That Nose"
1997	Ninja Turtles: The Next Mutation	Barbra	Episode: "Turtles' Night Out"
1998	First Wave	Esther	Episode: "Lungfish"
1998	Dead Man's Gun	Rose Harris	Episode: "The Pinkerton"
1998–99	The Outer Limits	Shal/Lisa Dobkins	Guest Cast: Season 4-5
1999	Viper	Mitzi/Olga	Episode: "Best Seller"
1999	Seven Days	Princess Lisette D'Arcy	Episode: "Love and Other Disasters"
2000	The Beach Boys: An American Family	Pamela	Episode: "Part 1 & 2"
2000	Higher Ground	Elaine Barringer	Recurring Cast
2000	So Weird	Donna	Episode: "Snapshot"
2001	Level 9	Christina Veedy	Episode: "Mob.com"
2001	Big Sound	Veronica	Episode: "Jam Session"
2001	MythQuest	Persephone	Episode: "Orpheus"
2002	Beyond Belief: Fact or Fiction	Susan	Episode: "The Doll"
2002	Charmed	Dr. Ava Nicolae	Episode: "The Eyes Have It"
2002	Just Cause	Louisa Bennett	Episode: "Making News"
2002	My Guide to Becoming a Rock Star	Sarah Nelson	Main Cast
2002–03	Smallville	Dr. Helen Bryce	Recurring role (seasons 2-3); 9 episodes
2003	The Handler	Angie	Episode: "Off the Edge"
2004	North Shore	Melinda Lindsey Kellogg	Recurring Cast
2004	Veronica Mars	Monica Hadwin Greenblatt	Episode: "An Echolls Family Christmas"
2004–05	One Tree Hill	Nicki	Recurring Cast: Season 1-2
2005	Andromeda	Maura	Episode: "The Heart of the Journey: Part 1 & 2"
2005	Love, Inc.	Girl	Episode: "Amen"
2005–15	Two and a Half Men	Mia	Recurring Cast: Season 3 & 7, Guest: Season 5-6 & 9 & 12
2006	Monk	Pat - Juror No. 12	Episode 4.16: "Mr. Monk Gets Jury Duty"
2006	Masters of Horror	Kim	Episode: "Pro-Life"
2006–09	CSI: NY	Det. Jessica Angell	Recurring Cast: Season 3-5
2007	Supernatural	Madison	Episode: "Heart"
2007	Big Shots	Wanda Barnes	Episode: "Three's a Crowd"
2010	Human Target	Emma Barnes	Recurring Cast: Season 1
2010	Hawaii Five-0	Erica Raines	Episode: "Po'ipu"
2010–11	Covert Affairs	Liza Hearn	Recurring Cast: Season 1, Guest: Season 2
2010–15	Lost Girl	Evony Fleurette Marquise	Recurring Cast
2011	The Haunting Hour: The Series	Abigail	Episode: "The Red Dress"
2011	The Protector	Mrs. Gardener	Episode: "Revisions"
2013	The Mentalist	Melissa Enfield	Episode: "There Will Be Blood"
2013	Republic of Doyle	Gabriela Del Toro	Episode: "Bon Cop, Bueno Cop"
2015	Mistresses	Niko	Recurring Cast: Season 3
2017	Rogue	Regan	Recurring Cast: Season 4
2018	Millennial Mafia	Francesca	Recurring Cast
2019	Magnum P.I.	Katrina	Episode: "I, The Deceased"
2020	MacGyver	Major Anne Frost	Episode: "Red Cell + Quantum + Cold + Committed"
2021	Supergirl	Peggy Bishop, Margaret Bishop	Episode: "Mxy in the Middle"
2024	Polly Pocket	Madame Lulufoofoo / Assistant 3 (voice)	Episode: "The Lulufoofoo Switcherooroo"

=== Video games ===
Year	Title	Role	Notes
2006	Need for Speed: Carbon	Nikki	Voice, motion capture, and likeness
2015	Dying Light	Jade	Motion capture
2015	Hellraid	Maine, The Female Kin	Voice
