= Finding Carter =

2014 American teen drama television series

- Genre: Teen drama; Family drama
- Created by: Emily Jessica Silver
- Developed by: Terri Minsky
- Starring: Kathryn Prescott; Cynthia Watros; Alexis Denisof; Anna Jacoby-Heron; Zac Pullam; Alex Saxon
- Opening theme: "Vagabond" by MisterWives
- Composer: Jacob Yoffee
- Country of origin: United States
- Original language: English
- No. of seasons: 2
- No. of episodes: 36 (list of episodes)

Production
- Executive producers: Terri Minsky; Deborah Spera; Maria Grasso; Alexander A. Motlagh; Emily Whitesell
- Production location: Atlanta, Georgia
- Running time: 42 minutes
- Production companies: The Popfilms Movie Company; Go Dog Go (season 1); One Two Punch Productions (season 1); Stockton Drive, Inc. (season 2); Warner Horizon Television; MTV Production Development; Georgia Media

Original release
- Network: MTV
- Release: July 8, 2014 – December 15, 2015

Finding Carter is an American teen drama television series that aired on MTV for two seasons from July 8, 2014, to December 15, 2015.

The first season, which consisted of 12 episodes, finished airing in September 2014. A month after its debut, MTV renewed Finding Carter for a second season of an additional 12 episodes, which was later extended to 24 episodes. The network later cancelled the series in January 2016.

== Plot ==
The show focuses on 16-year-old Carter Stevens, who lived an idyllic life in Pennsylvania as a popular, smart, and pretty girl with a close relationship with her single mother. However, after getting arrested for breaking and entering, her life is entirely flipped upside down when she discovers the horrifying truth—that she was abducted from Virginia 13 years ago, by the woman who claims to be her mother. She is swiftly forced to adjust to her former family – including her parents, her goody-two-shoes twin sister Taylor, and her overlooked younger brother Grant – while also uncovering dark secrets that make her abduction more complicated than it appears.

== Episodes ==
Season	Episodes		Originally released	
Season	Episodes		First released	Last released
1	12		July 8, 2014	September 16, 2014
2	24	12	March 31, 2015	June 16, 2015
2	24	12	October 6, 2015	December 15, 2015

== Cast ==
=== Main ===
- Kathryn Prescott as Carter Wilson (born Lyndon Wilson, previously Carter Stevens), who was kidnapped at age 3 and is reunited with her birth parents after being arrested. Carter is very rebellious, sneaky and fun-loving. At first she despises Elizabeth for taking her away from Lori, refusing to acknowledge her as her 'mother'. She pulls stunts and different schemes to purposely annoy Elizabeth. However, after realizing the truth of all matters, Carter comes to accept Elizabeth as her mother and learns to deal with her family's chaotic ways.
- Cynthia Watros as Elizabeth Wilson, Carter, Taylor, and Grant's mother and a detective with the Fairfax, VA police department. Elizabeth is very dedicated to finding common ground with Carter, sacrificing much time and resources (often at her family's expense). She was on the brink of divorce before reuniting with Carter, but ultimately decided she wanted her family together for once. She had slept with Kyle extensively before her family found out and forced her to come clean to David.
- Alexis Denisof as David Wilson, Carter, Taylor, and Grant's father and a writer. He is pressured by his agent to write the book 'Finding Carter'. He lies about the book at first, reassuring Carter he would not publish anything or begin writing without her permission. However, he had already completed the memoir before even telling her the truth. He had an affair with Lori Stevens prior to Carter's abduction, revealing to Elizabeth that it was mostly his fault. David later takes a job as a professor at an academy.
- Anna Jacoby-Heron as Taylor Wilson, Carter's fraternal twin sister, and Max's off and on girlfriend. Taylor is extremely intelligent, thoughtful and caring. She often gives Carter advice, eventually resulting in the two becoming very close. She later becomes romantically involved with Max, Carter's ex. They break up when she cannot accept how Max can forgive his former attacker.
- Zac Pullam as Grant Wilson, Carter and Taylor's younger brother. Grant sees himself as the "replacement child", describing this in a way that everyone simply looks over him. He rarely receives attention, making him very impressionable and skeptical. He has an online relationship with a girl he Skypes with regularly.
- Alex Saxon as Max Wagner (season 2; recurring, season 1), Taylor's boyfriend and Carter's best friend that she met while living with Lori. Max is compassionate and understanding, often the one his friends turn to for advice. He had a friends with benefits relationship with Carter before meeting Taylor, later becoming her boyfriend. He had a rather traumatic childhood, witnessing his mother being stabbed by his father when he was young. As a result of this, he does not let hatred build up inside of him; Max forgives Crash for almost taking his life because he wants to spare himself from any additional pain.

=== Recurring ===
- Milena Govich as Lori Stevens, who kidnapped Lyndon when she was three and raised her as Carter Stevens. It is revealed in the first episode of season 2 that she was an egg donor for Elizabeth and David, and is Carter and Taylor's biological mother. She is delusional and deeply convinced that she has all parental rights to Carter and Taylor. Lori is deemed insane and sent to a mental institution, later becoming suicidal.
- Vanessa Morgan as Beatrix "Bird" Castro, Carter's best friend. In "Now You See Me" she reveals to Carter she was assaulted by a guy in a mask. Bird's parents are very well-off, and leave her for the most part to raise herself. After her parents skip town, their home is foreclosed on and she is forced to deal with the repercussions. She has a brief relationship with Madison before dating a guy named Seth. After he overdoses and dies, Bird finds out she is pregnant and has an abortion.
- Jesse Henderson as Gabe Medeiros, Carter's friend and Taylor's best friend/former crush. He is the son of Elizabeth's partner, Kyle. Gabe has a one-sided interest in Carter, which she refuses because she thinks Taylor likes him. He lost his mother to brain cancer at a young age; Gabe firmly believes his father loved Elizabeth.
- Jesse Carere as Ofe, Carter's friend and Taylor's former love interest. He was known for selling drugs that Crash supplies. He is crafty and quick-witted, considering himself a ladies' man by his own standards. He was Taylor's love interest, but decides to break up with Taylor in fear that she will break his heart. He leaves for a rehab program soon after.
- Caleb Ruminer as Cameron "Crash" Mason, an ex-juvenile delinquent who was a drug dealer. He is Carter's boyfriend. He was hated by Carter's family initially, giving the wrong impressions when he shot Max in season 1 and eventually ruining his relationship with her. When the two make up later on, and after becoming friends with Max, proving he is reformed, he gets into trouble with his Uncle Shay, causing him out of fear to leave town and enlist in the army.
- Eddie Matos as Kyle Medeiros, Gabe's father and Elizabeth's partner with whom she had an affair before and briefly after Carter was found. Kyle secretly hopes that Elizabeth will choose him over David and holds out hope almost relentlessly. In season 2, episode 11, he is shot by Crash's uncle, and dies from his injuries.
- Meredith Baxter as Grandma Joan, Elizabeth's mother and the kids' grandmother. She is a wealthy, respected woman around town. Joan disapproves of her daughter's decision to marry David for his uncertain career and financial instability.
- Robert Pine as Grandpa Buddy, Elizabeth's father, Joan's husband and the kids' grandfather. He is supportive of his daughter and caring when it comes to his grandchildren.
- Stephen Guarino as Toby, literary agent of the father
- Molly Kunz as Madison, one of Carter's old "friends" from when she lived with Lori. She visited Carter after getting kicked out by her parents, who despise her for being a lesbian. Madison later tells Bird that she came because Lori sent her, feeling as if she was used to lure Carter away from the Wilsons'.
- Erin Chambers as Hillary, David's assistant and love interest
- Mason Dye as Damon
- Elizabeth Hunter as Reagan, Grant's internet friend and love interest
- Ben Winchell as Benjamin Wallace, Lori and David's biological son
- Madison McLaughlin as Olivia, Ben's foster sister
- Jackson Rathbone as Jared, bartender and owner of bar who hired Carter as a waitress

== Production and development ==
Finding Carter was written as a writing sample by Emily Silver, who then shopped it around to networks such as ABC Family and MTV. Shortly after, Terri Minsky was brought onto the project as an executive producer and the pilot went through a re-write. On September 12, 2013, MTV placed a pilot order. Scott Speer then signed on to direct the pilot.

On January 30, 2014, Finding Carter was given a 12-episode series order. Filming for Finding Carter takes place in Atlanta, Georgia, in Westlake High School's old facility. In April, it was announced that Jesse Henderson would play Gabe, the role in which Nolan Sotillo was previously cast.

On August 19, 2014, MTV renewed the show for a second season containing 12 episodes. On January 10, 2015, it was announced that Season 2 would premier on March 31, 2015. On May 18, 2015, it was announced that there would be a 12 episode extension to season 2 which premiered in October. The season finale of season 2 was on December 15, 2015. On January 29, 2016, MTV announced the show's cancellation because of a drop in viewers.

=== Casting ===
Casting announcements began in October 2013, with Cynthia Watros first cast in the role of Elizabeth Wilson, a police detective and Carter's biological mother. Shortly after, Kathryn Prescott, Anna Jacoby-Heron, Zac Pullam, and Jesse Henderson were cast in the series. Prescott signed onto the role of Carter Stevens, the confident and mischievous lead, who has a close relationship with the woman she thought was her mother; Jacoby-Heron was chosen for the role of Taylor Wilson, Carter's fraternal twin sister; Pullam was cast as Grant, Carter's somewhat-detached younger brother who was born after her disappearance; and Henderson joined in the role of Gabe, Taylor's close friend who immediately finds himself attracted to Carter. In early November, Alexis Denisof was cast as David Wilson, Carter's father, who found success as a novelist after writing a book about his daughter's disappearance. Milena Govich plays the role of Lori, the woman who abducted Carter when she was three.

== Reception ==
Finding Carter has been met with positive reviews from critics. The first season received a 71 out of 100 on Metacritic, indicating generally favorable reviews, based on 9 critic reviews. On Rotten Tomatoes, season one holds a rating of 88%, based on 8 reviews, with an average rating 7.1/10.

== Broadcast ==
In Australia, the series premiered on July 16, 2015, on FOX8. On November 26, 2015, MTV Portugal started broadcasting the show's first season. MTV Denmark started broadcasting both seasons on June 6, 2016. The second season began June 22, 2016. MTV UK began broadcasting the show's first season on June 21, 2016. In Germany Disney Channel started broadcasting the show; in the UK, it was shown on channel 5STAR in 2017.
