= Daniel Kash =

Canadian actor and film director (born 1959)

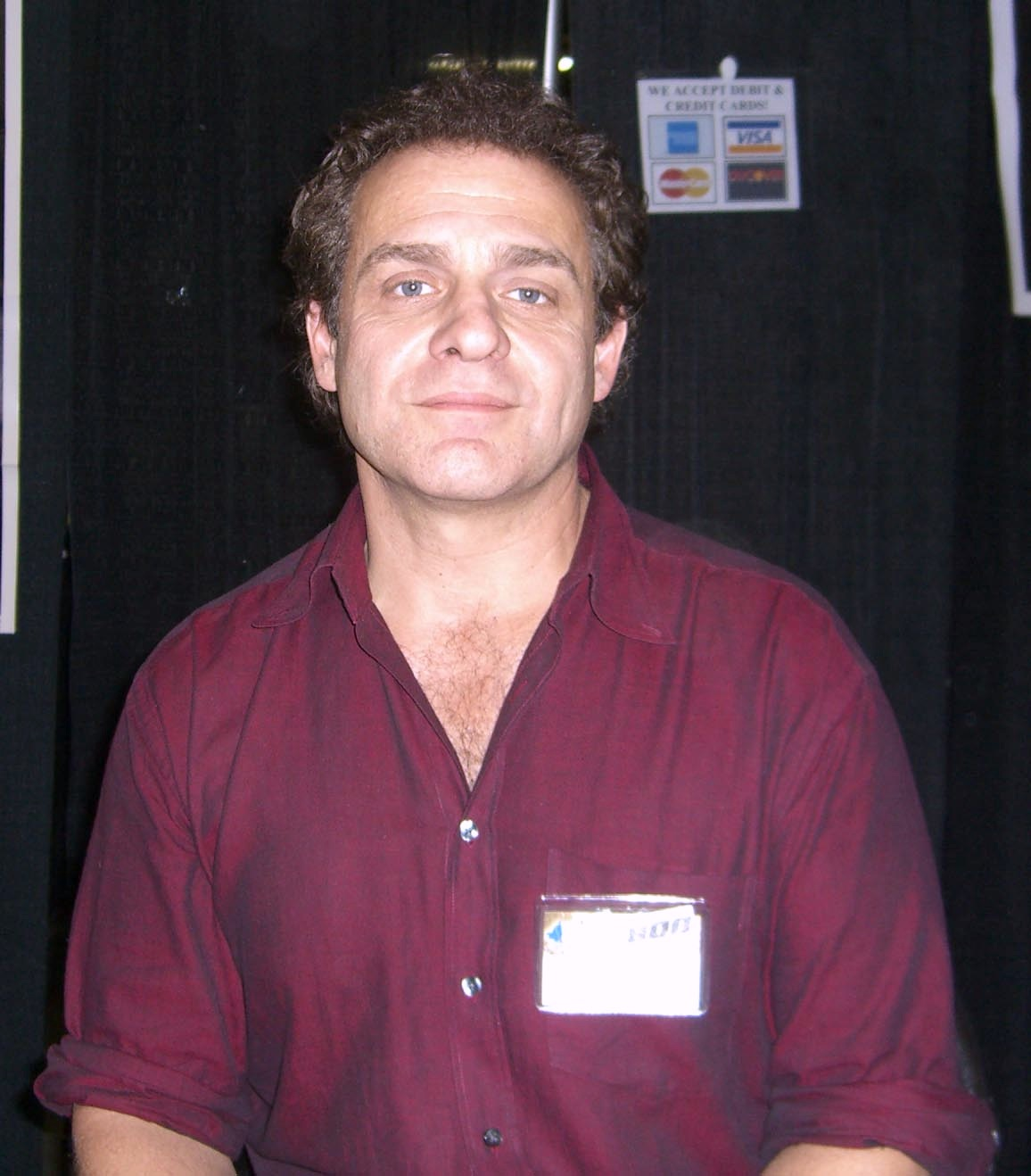
- Kash at the Big Apple Convention in New York City in 2009
- Born: April 25, 1959 (age 67); Montreal, Quebec, Canada
- Education: Drama Centre London
- Occupations: Actor and film director
- Years active: 1986–present
- Spouse: Hayley Tyson (m. 1988)
- Children: 2
- Mother: Maureen Forrester
- Relatives: Linda Kash (sister)

Daniel Joshua Kash (born April 25, 1959) is a Canadian actor and film director. He is known for his appearances in films such as Aliens, The Hunt for the BTK Killer, and The Path to 9/11, and in television series such as Law & Order, Orphan Black and The Expanse.

== Early life ==
Kash was born in Montreal, Quebec, the son of Canadian opera singer Maureen Forrester and Toronto-born violinist and conductor Eugene Kash. He is the brother of actress Linda Kash. His father's family was Jewish, while his mother converted to Judaism.

He studied acting in Britain at Drama Centre London and has appeared in both film and television. His first film role was Private Spunkmeyer in Aliens (1986).

== Career ==
Kash has appeared in the films Life with Judy Garland: Me and My Shadows, Camp Rock 2: The Final Jam (as Axel Turner), The Hunt for the BTK Killer, Crown Heights, True Confections, Gross Misconduct, Mr. Rock 'n' Roll: The Alan Freed Story, The Path to 9/11, Solo, The Last Days of Patton, Mama and Easy Land.

He has appeared in the TV series Nikita, The Event, The Line, A Taste of Shakespeare, Relic Hunter, Goosebumps, Due South, Law & Order, RoboCop: The Series, Street Legal, The Hitchhiker, Forever Knight, Lifetime's MISSING, Angela's Eyes, Hannibal and Orphan Black. He also had recurring roles on the FX TV series The Strain (as Everett Barnes), on the Syfy series The Expanse as the villain Dresden, and Bitten as the Alpha Werewolf for the Russian pack, and a main role in Bad Blood as Enzo Cosoleto.

Kash was featured in Ubisoft's 2014 video game Watch Dogs as main antagonist Damien Brenks. He is also in the 2014 video game Thief as Orion, the main character.

He directed three short films: Germgirl, Flip Phone and For Lease (2007).

== Personal life ==
Kash married actress and producer Hayley Tyson in 1988. They have two sons together, Kenzie and Tyson.

== Filmography ==
=== Film ===
- Aliens (1986) – Private Spunkmeyer
- Nightbreed (1990) – Labowitz
- Hurt Penguins (1992) – Nick Piccione
- Farther West (1992)
- The Michelle Apartments (1995) – Dean
- Virus (1996) – Ripley
- Wounded (1997) – David Boyd
- Ernest in the Army (1998) – Danny / Crew guy
- The Sleep Room (1998) – Aaron Rothenberg
- Bone Daddy (1998) – Rocky
- Hidden Agenda (1999) – Volker Flenske
- External Affairs (1999) – Sergei Kulekin
- Pilgrim (2000) – Hogan
- Exit Wounds (2001) – Rory
- Don't Say a Word (2001) – Detective Garcia
- Under Heavy Fire (aka Going Back, 2001) – Eric
- The Shipping News (2001) – Detective Danzig
- Interstate 60 (2002) – Elmer the Bettor
- The Tuxedo (2002) – Rogers
- The Gospel of John (2003) – Simon Peter
- Cold Creek Manor (2003) – Local
- Direct Action (2004) – LoPresti
- The Good Shepherd (2006) – Jeffrey Altman
- Cinderella Man (2005) – Reporter #3
- Lucky Number Slevin (2006) – Bodyguard #1
- One Way (2006) – Bert Zikinsky
- Fugitive Pieces (2007) – Maurice
- Diary of the Dead (2007) – Police officer
- Jack Brooks: Monster Slayer (2007) – Counselor Silverstein
- Magic Flute Diaries (2008) – Monostatos
- Puck Hogs (2009) – Sergei Ulonov
- Repo Men (2010) – Chipped Tooth
- Casino Jack (2010) – Gus Boulis
- Citizen Gangster (2011) – Al
- On the Road (2012) – Henry Glass
- A Dark Truth (2012) – Caller
- Mama (2013) – Dr. Dreyfuss
- Solo (2013) – Ray
- Breakout (2013) – Chuck
- RoboCop (2014) – John Lake
- Corner Gas: The Movie (2014) – Jerome's Lawyer
- Remember (2015) – Retirement home director
- Born to Be Blue (2015) – Prothodontist (voice)
- Manhattan Undying (2016) – Det. Roberts
- Joseph & Mary (2016) – High priest
- XXX: Return of Xander Cage (2017) – Russian spymaster
- Ordinary Days (2017) – Abe Barnard
- The Kindness of Strangers (2019) – Jeff's landlord
- Easy Land (2019) – Greg
- The Man from Toronto (2022) – Detective Elkins
- Joy to the World (2025) - Merriman
- Den Mother Crimson (2025) — Leo Abrams

=== Television ===
Daniel Kash television credits
Year	Title	Role	Notes
1986	The Last Days of Patton	Melvin	TV movie
1991	True Confections	Laurence Albert Simon	TV movie
1991	Counterstrike	Dr. Luttke	Episode: "Village of the Damned"
1993	Gross Misconduct	Brian Spencer	TV movie
1994–1996	Due South	Detective Louis Gardino	Main cast (seasons 1–2)
1995	Goosebumps	Karl Knave	3 episodes
1998	American Whiskey Bar	P	TV movie
1999	Mr. Rock 'n' Roll: The Alan Freed Story	Hooke	TV movie
2001	Life with Judy Garland: Me and My Shadows	Arthur Freed	Miniseries
2005	The Hunt for the BTK Killer	Hurst Laviana	TV movie
2006	The Path to 9/11	Dave Williams	Miniseries
2010	Camp Rock 2: The Final Jam	Axel	TV movie
2017	Crown Heights	Judah Kwass	TV movie
2018	Bad Blood	Lorenzo "Enzo" Cosoleto	Main cast (season 2)
2020	Tiny Pretty Things	Sgt. Dan Lavery	Recurring role
2024	My Dead Mom	Benjamin	Episode: "Shana Tova"
