= Solo (2013 film) =

- Directed by: Isaac Cravit
- Written by: Isaac Cravit
- Starring: Annie Clark; Daniel Kash; Richard Clarkin
- Cinematography: Stephen Chung
- Edited by: Adam Locke-Norton
- Music by: Todor Kobakov
- Production company: Lumanity Productions
- Distributed by: Shock Till You Drop (US); Indiecan (Canada)
- Release date: August 29, 2013 (Canada)
- Running time: 83 Minutes
- Country: Canada
- Language: English

Solo is a 2013 Canadian mystery thriller film directed by Isaac Cravit and is the first film released under Shock Till You Drop's US film distribution branch. First released on August 29, 2013, in Canada, it stars Annie Clark as a teenager who finds herself terrorized after she is left alone in the woods for a two-night camp counselor initiation process.

Of his inspiration for the film, Cravit mentioned that he was moved to create Solo after a friend of his told him a campfire story in which a girl looks through her summer camp photos to discover that an unknown person had taken pictures of her while she slept.

== Synopsis ==
Gillian (Annie Clark) is a teenager who reluctantly takes a job as a camp counselor at a summer camp. Before she can take the job, Gillian is informed that she must prove her survival skills at a nearby island on the camp's property which is rumored to be haunted by the ghost of a former camper. She's reassured that it's safe, but is put on edge when she comes across Ray (Daniel Kash), a local man who claims that Gillian had sent out a distress call. Her uneasiness grows until later that night, when her seemingly easy two-day initiation rite turns sinister.

== Cast ==
- Annie Clark as Gillian
- Daniel Kash as Ray
- Richard Clarkin as Fred
- Steven Love as Marty
- Alyssa Capriotti as Lacey
- Sarah Emes as Janie
- Sonia Laplante as Therapist
- Megann McCandless as Gillian's Sister

== Reception ==
Critical reception for Solo has been mixed to positive. Common praise centered around the film's restraint and slow build towards suspense, and Fearnet commented that the movie was "rather quietly intense and engaging". Criticisms for Solo tended to center around elements that the reviewers felt were "predictable twists and turns that fans of the genre will be able to catch from the end of the first act". Twitch Film gave a mostly negative review, as they felt that the film did not make use of its full potential and that more use of the film's inspiration or of sound would have improved the movie's tension.
