= Dahlia Salem =

American actress

- Born: New York City, U.S.
- Occupation: Film/television actress
- Years active: 1995 - Present

Dahlia Salem (born November 21) is an American actress. She played Sofia Carlino on Another World and Claire Walsh on General Hospital. At the age of six, she was already impersonating family and friends at gatherings. After enrolling in Boston University, Salem began exploring her interest in acting by performing in several college productions including Othello and Biloxi Blues, and earned a nomination for The Irene Ryan Award for her portrayal of Helena in R.U.R. After earning her bachelor's degree, Salem was accepted to the Circle in the Square Theater Conservatory program in New York City, where she studied for two years. Among her noteworthy stage performances are a staged reading of the classic Strindberg play The Father, opposite Al Pacino, and her Broadway debut as the understudy for the role of Rosa in the Broadway production of Tennessee Williams' classic, The Rose Tattoo, opposite Mercedes Ruehl and Anthony LaPaglia.

Upon completing the Conservatory program, Salem signed on with an agent and landed the role of the sassy and passionate Sofia Carlino on the NBC daytime drama Another World. After three years as Sofia, Salem decided to pursue a career in primetime television and film, and before long, she made guest star appearances on NBC's Third Watch and CBS' Now and Again. Her other acting credits include a seven-episode run as supporting cast in the medical drama series ER, an appearance in Fox Family Channel's The Fearing Mind, and a minor role in the 2001 Disney film New Port South.

== Personal life ==
Salem lives in Los Angeles with her chocolate labrador Amelie.

== Filmography ==
- Another World (unknown episodes, 1995–98) – Sofia Carlino
- Now and Again (2 episodes, "Fire and Ice" and "Disco Inferno", 2000) – Woman / Miss Avalona
- Third Watch (1 episode, "Journey to the Himalayas", 2000) – Sheila
- Return to Cabin by the Lake (2001) (TV) – Alison Gaddis
- New Port South (2001) – Kameron
- The Agency (1 episode, "The Enemy Within", 2002)
- Sex, Politics & Cocktails (2002) (assistant director) (uncredited)
- Alaska (2003) (TV) – Allison Harper
- CSI: Crime Scene Investigation (1 episode, "Crash and Burn", 2003) – Elaine Alcott
- Threat Matrix (1 episode, "Veteran's Day", 2003) – DEA Agent Maria Cruz
- Peacemakers (1 episode, "A Town Without Pity", 2003) – Sabrina Hamilton
- JAG (1 episode, "The Boast", 2003) – Ginny Serrano
- Eyes (1 episode, "Shots", 2005) – Elisa Cruz
- The King of Queens (1 episode, "Sandwiched Out", 2005) – Waitress
- House (1 episode, "Sleeping Dogs Lie", 2006) – Max
- CSI: Miami (1 episode, "One of Our Own", 2006) – FBI Agent Heather Landrey
- ER (7 episodes, 2005–06) – Dr. Jessica Albright
- Criminal Minds (1 episode, "Aftermath", 2006) – Maggie Callahan
- Her Sister's Keeper (2006) (TV) – Kate Brennan
- Justice (2 episodes, "Shotgun" and "Christmas Party", 2006) – DA then DDA Susan Hale
- The Nines (2007) – Herself
- Army Wives (1 episode, "Nobody's Perfect", 2007) – Belinda Greer
- Paul Blart: Mall Cop (2009) – Mother
- Medium (1 episode, "All in the Family", 2009) – Harmony Fletcher
- Love Finds a Home (2009) (TV) – Mabel Mcqueen
- Castle (1 episode, "The Fifth Bullet", 2009) – Tory Westchester
- The Forgotten (1 episode, "Patient John", 2010) – Dr. Mallory Messenger
- In Plain Sight "Love in the Time of Colorado" (2011) – Winnie Kirsh
- General Hospital (96 episodes, 2010) – Claire Walsh
- Cut! (2014) – Chloe Joe
- CSI: Cyber (1 episode, "Click Your Poison", 2015) – Jane Bruno
- NCIS (1 episode, “Decompressed”, 2016) as Maria De La Rosa
