= Wishmaster 3: Beyond the Gates of Hell =

2001 film

- DVD cover
- Directed by: Chris Angel
- Written by: Alex Wright
- Based on: Characters by Peter Atkins
- Produced by: Gary Howsam; Gilles Paquin; Craig Nicholls
- Starring: Jason Connery; A. J. Cook; Tobias Mehler; Louisette Geiss; Aaron Smolinski; Daniella Evangelista; Emmanuelle Vaugier; John Novak
- Cinematography: Curtis J. Petersen
- Edited by: Marcus Manton
- Music by: Daryl Bennet; Jim Guttridge
- Distributed by: Artisan Entertainment
- Release date: October 23, 2001
- Running time: 92 minutes
- Country: United States
- Language: English

Wishmaster 3: Beyond the Gates of Hell, known as Wishmaster 3: Devil Stone in the United Kingdom, is 2001 American fantasy horror film directed by Chris Angel and starring Jason Connery and A. J. Cook. It is the third installment of the Wishmaster series although John Novak replaces Andrew Divoff as the Djinn in the movie. It was the second direct-to-video sequel in the franchise and was filmed in Winnipeg, Manitoba, Canada.

== Plot ==
For the third time, the evil Wishmaster returns to wreck the lives of more innocents. This time, his victim is a studious teenage girl named Diana Collins who accidentally opened up the Djinn's tomb (a strange box with a jewel inside) and released him. After gaining his freedom, the Djinn is asked by Professor Barash to let him be the one who makes the wishes. The professor wishes for two of the world's loveliest ladies to be in love with him. The women summoned by the wish kill the professor and the Djinn assumes his identity. He then kills a secretary when she wishes for "files to burn up" but instead of the files, she burns. He takes the student file of Diana in an effort to find her and force her to fulfill her three wishes. While Diana is on the run, she must endeavor to prevent the Djinn from subjecting the entire world to Hell's wrath. She goes to a church for safety, but the Djinn is there instead of the priest. Her friend Ann, who is now the professor's teaching assistant, wishes to "lose a little weight," causing her to puke up her guts in pain. Diana uses her first wish to stop Ann's pain, which results in the Djinn killing Ann.

Diana, noting that she is in a St. Michael church, uses a wish to summon the archangel Michael who possesses the body of her boyfriend Greg. A fight ensues with the Djinn gaining an upper hand, but Michael and Diana escape into a stage theater. As the Djinn tries to follow them, he encounters a female student named Elinor who makes romantic advances on him, and then wishes for him to "break her heart," which he literally does. The Djinn goes to Diana's room where her friend Billy is. Billy is killed by telling the Djinn to "blow him;" he blows his body onto a wooden head of a bull, impaling him on the horns. The Djinn picks up a photo of Diana and her friends and threatens to hurt Katie unless Diana makes her third wish. Michael has revealed to her that only by using his sword can she kill the Djinn. She is not ready, and when he does try to give her the sword, it burns her arm.

Katie finds the dead body of Billy and is pursued by the Djinn into a laboratory, where the Djinn tricks her into thinking she could hide. When she wishes "for a place to hide," he sticks her head into a cage of lab rats that bite at her head, killing her.

A second battle ensues between Michael and the Djinn, resulting in the Djinn's hand briefly being cut off by the sword, but it grows back. Michael escapes with Diana in a car, but the Djinn runs to the car, jumps on top of it, and tries to hurt them. Diana drives his side into another car, making him fall off. She careens into an information post and the car is flipped, mimicking how her parents had died years earlier. Diana's suicide attempt by jumping off a building gives her the ability to wield Michael's sword, and she kills the Djinn with it, but is fatally injured when they both fall in the process. Michael heals her wounds before returning to Heaven, and Diana is finally able to admit she loves her boyfriend, who has returned to normal.

== Cast ==
- Jason Connery as Professor Joel Barash
- John Novak as The Djinn
- A. J. Cook as Diana Collins
  - Kate Yacula as Young Diana Collins
- Tobias Mehler as Greg Jansen / St. Michael the Archangel
- Louisette Geiss as Katie York
- Aaron Smolinski as Billy Matthews
- Emmanuelle Vaugier as Elinor Smith
- Sarah Carter as Melissa Bell
- Daniella Evangelista as Anne
- Jennifer Pudavick as Jose Rodriguez

== Production ==
In December 2000, it was reported that Overseas Filmgroup intended to produce a third Wishmaster film as part of their development slate. Andrew Divoff, who played the Djinn in Wishmaster and Wishmaster 2: Evil Never Dies, had written his own script for a third Wishmaster film titled Wishmaster: The Third Millennium which would've incorporated real life paranoia about the Y2K and would've been much larger in scope with Divoff describing the opening as having an "American warship getting struck by a missile in Asia, while a meeting at the UN is interrupted by creatures coming to life and tearing apart the crowd". Divoff presented his script to Lions Gate who rejected his script on the grounds it wouldn't be financially feasible. Divoff ultimately departed the series on good terms with the producers and voiced hope that he'd be able to return for a future installment as the Djinn.

Wishmaster 3: Beyond the Gates of Hell and Wishmaster: The Prophecy Fulfilled were shot back-to-back in Winnipeg, Manitoba. David DeCoteau was initially slated to direct the films, but scheduling conflicts with DeCoteau's The Brotherhood led to him leaving the productions.

== Release ==
Wishmaster 3: Beyond the Gates of Hell was given a straight-to-video release in the United States on October 23, 2001.

== Reception ==
On Rotten Tomatoes, the film has four reviews, all of which are negative.

== Sequel ==
A sequel titled Wishmaster: The Prophecy Fulfilled, was released in 2002.

== See also ==
- List of films about angels

== Works cited ==
- Vatnsdal, Caelum (2004). They Came From Within: A History of Canadian Horror Cinema. Arbeiter Ring Publishing. ISBN 9781894037211.
