= Mindstorm (film) =

- Home video cover art
- Written by: Paul A. Birkett
- Directed by: Richard Pepin
- Starring: Emmanuelle Vaugier; Eric Roberts; Michael Ironside; Antonio Sabàto Jr.
- Country of origin: United States
- Original language: English

Production
- Producer: TVA International

Original release
- Network: Sci Fi Channel
- Release: February 28, 2001

Mindstorm is a 2001 Sci Fi Pictures science fiction television film directed by Richard Pepin, and starring Eric Roberts and Michael Ironside. It's not to be confused with Project: Human Weapon (aka Mindstorm) starring Judge Reinhold, released in the same year.

== Plot ==
When psychic private detective Tracy Wellman is retained by presidential candidate Senator William Armitage help to find his missing daughter, Rayanna, she encounters the telepathic cult leader David Mendez, who helps her learn they were both products of Cold War experiments. Mendez wants revenge against Armitage, who at the time was the NSA Director, and who betrayed the program to the Soviets. With the help of her friend, FBI Agent Dan Oliver, Wellman later discovers Mendez's motives go far beyond revenge, forcing her to confront her past and her missing memories.

== Cast ==
- Emmanuelle Vaugier as Tracey Wellman
- Eric Roberts as David Mendez
- Michael Ironside as Senator William Armitage
- Antonio Sabàto Jr. as FBI Agent Dan Oliver
- William B. Davis as Dr. Parish
- Clarence Williams III as Walter Golden
- Mark Holden as FBI Agent Mark Taft

== Production and release ==
The film was shot in Vancouver, British Columbia. It was released as a Sci Fi Pictures science fiction TV-movie.

== Home media ==
Mindstorm was released on DVD in the U.S. by Monarch Home Video.
