= Down and Dangerous =

- Film poster
- Directed by: Zak Forsman
- Written by: Zak Forsman
- Produced by: Kevin K. Shah
- Starring: Ross Marquand; Judd Nelson
- Cinematography: Addison Brock III; Sam Krueger
- Edited by: Jamie Cobb
- Music by: Deklun
- Production companies: The Sabi Company; Artis Entertainment
- Distributed by: Origin Releasing; Gravitas Ventures
- Release date: April 5, 2013 (Phoenix)
- Running time: 95 minutes
- Country: United States
- Languages: English; Spanish

Down and Dangerous is a 2013 American crime thriller film featuring Ross Marquand and Judd Nelson.

== Plot ==
Always one step ahead of the Feds, Paul Boxer is the most inventive and principled smuggler in the trade, and has never needed to carry a gun. When violent mid-level traffickers coerce him into designing a foolproof plan to bring several kilos of cocaine across the México border, he maneuvers to rid himself of their hold over him once and for all. But when a sharp-witted woman from his past enlists his help to escape this rival outfit, Paul must confront the man that is hunting him down, and choose between his livelihood as a smuggler and his integrity as a man.

== Cast ==
- John T. Woods as Paul Boxer
- Paulie Rojas as Olivia Ivarra
- Ross Marquand as Henry Langlois
- Judd Nelson as Charles
- Ernest Curcio as Rafael Garza
- Dusty Sorg as Elliot Reid
- Luis Robledo as DEA Special Agent Arturo Rezendes

== Reception ==
On review aggregator Rotten Tomatoes, the film holds an approval rating of 60% based on 5 reviews, with an average rating of 4.7/10. On Metacritic, the film has a weighted average score of 43 out of 100, based on 4 critics, indicating "mixed or average" reviews.

Frank Scheck of The Hollywood Reporter said that "The convoluted, cliché-ridden storyline, apparently inspired by the director’s father’s real-life experiences in the drug trade, is the least interesting element, while the brief, perfunctory action sequences no doubt reflect the low budget. But the film certainly looks and sounds good".

Peter Labuza of Variety wrote "Relying on a synthesized score, over-saturated cinematography and frustratingly cliched dialogue, this is an extremely generic, truly empty tale of a drug smuggler involved with cops and criminals alike."
