= Hysteria (1997 film) =

1997 film directed by Rene Daalder

- Directed by: Rene Daalder
- Written by: Rene Daalder
- Produced by: Kay Salomon Marchand; Danièle Rohrbach
- Starring: Patrick McGoohan; Amanda Plummer; Michael Maloney; Emmanuelle Vaugier
- Cinematography: Jean Lépine
- Edited by: Gaétan Huot
- Music by: Ralph Grierson
- Production company: August Entertainment
- Release date: 1997
- Running time: 103 minutes
- Countries: Canada; United Kingdom
- Language: English

Hysteria is a 1997 British-Canadian psychological thriller film written and directed by Rene Daalder, starring Patrick McGoohan, Amanda Plummer, Michael Maloney and Emmanuelle Vaugier.

== Plot ==
The inmates of a psychiatric hospital are subjected to radical experiments by being implanted with chips that affect the collective consciousness, with the goal of creating the perfect citizen. Dr. Harvey Langston did indeed attempt to connect the brains of a group of patients, with corresponding implications for the collective consciousness. The spirit and soul of each individual is now present collectively in each patient. This allows each individual to share each other's psychoses, dreams and even sexuality, and also means that someone who is violent towards others feels their pain firsthand, which means that no one is able to have the desire to hurt others anymore. Only the spirit of Myrna Malloy is stronger than that of the others and dominates them. Myrna, on the other hand, who is in a wheelchair, depends on others to meet her needs. The passion of the former dancer still belongs to ballet.

Dr. Samuel Fry has fallen in love with his patient Veronica Bloom, a psychotic woman who, lacking the drugs the patient needs for her treatment, the doctors can do nothing about. As a result, Fry has to release her, even though she still poses a danger to herself and others. He is also aware that she will then be dependent on prescription drugs and essentially have to live the life of a zombie. Fry brings Veronica with him to Dr. Langston, as he expects help for the young woman from the doctor he admires. At this point, Fry is unaware of how radical Langston's methods have become. However, when he becomes aware of what is going on in the asylum, Fry is determined to free Veronica from Langston's clutches. But first, he has to find Veronica's spirit, which has detached itself from her body.

However, Myrna Malloy manages to redirect his love in her direction. Fry's admiration for Langston, who chose him as his successor, has also meant that his resilience to resist Myrna's co-optation is not strong enough. Gradually, he becomes a willing participant, which is also due to the fact that Dr. Langston has long since transferred his own consciousness into his colleague's younger body. The implanted humans are sent back into the community. The plan is to turn more humans into controlled automatons that depend on each other to work together in perfect harmony. On the other hand, Langston's test group is also a monster that will ensure its own survival at any cost, including violence.

== Cast ==
- Patrick McGoohan as Dr. Harvey Langston
- Amanda Plummer as Myrna Malloy
- Michael Maloney as Dr. Samuel Fry
- Jo Vannicola as Blair
- Gregory Hlady as Syd Meeker
- Emmanuelle Vaugier as Veronica Bloom
- Joseph Wynne as Bobby Corrado
- Ralph Allison as Hollister Watcher
- Sam Stone as Vern Huckabee
- David Francis as Dr. Andrew Miller
- Louis Di Bianco as Mr. Corrado Sr.
- Jocelyne Zucco as Mrs. Corrado
- Mark Bromilow as Dr. Dan Wyatt
- Lynn Snelling as Nympho
- Rodrigue Proteau as Bald Man
- Lorne Brass as Sheriff Grierson
- Susan Glover as Mrs. Schmidt
- René-Madeleine Le Guerrier as Psycho Girl
- Gaétan Gingras as Epileptic
- Robert Higden as Man at Piano Bar

== Production ==
The film was produced by August Entertainment in association with Yellowbill Productions Ltd. and Kay Salomon Productions. Filming took place between May 13 and June 22, 1996, in Montreal, Quebec, Canada.

== Soundtrack ==
- "I Only Have Eyes for You" by Harry Warren and Al Dubin, performed by Lisbeth Scott and Lee Curreri
- "West by South West" by Duncan Millar, performed by As One
- Prelude in G minor by Frédéric Chopin, performed by Ralph Grierson
- "Rocks with Rolls" written and performed by Fred Myrow and Andrew Kapner
- "Mental Blues" by Alexander Baker, Clair Marlo and Bruce Watson, performed by Baker and Watson
- "Sarahan Dreaming" written and performed by Fred Myrow, Andrew Kapner and Gregg Arreguin
- The Marriage of Figaro by Wolfgang Amadeus Mozart, performed by Bruna Rizzoli
- "Lost in You" by Mike Stoller and Jerry Leiber, performed by Lisbeth Scott and Lee Curreri
- "Bittersweet" by Fred Myrow
- "Mentat: A Mind Opera" (adaptation) by Fred Myrow, performed by Axis Mundi Musicworks

== Release ==
In October 1997, Hysteria was shown at the Continental Film Festival in Panama and in February 1998 it was presented at the Fantasporto Film Festival in Portugal. The film was also released under the title Histeria in Spain.

The film was first shown on television in Germany on November 5, 2000, on Sat.1.

== Reception ==
=== Critical response ===
The German Lexikon des internationalen Films ("Encyclopedia of International Films") wrote succinctly: "Psychological thriller that combines the classic motif of the mad scientist with the theme of a collective disorder of consciousness.".

DVD Talk’s Tyler Foster said Hysteria is a film that can't quite find the right balance between the bizarre and the intriguing. [...] The film jumps around, never quite settling on a particular rhythm or style, happy to peer into whatever nook and cranny Daalder's mind drifts to at a given moment." Foster concluded that "Hysteria is a very unusual film that will only truly appeal to an extremely specific segment of the audience. It's admirably ambitious, but the bulk of the film ignores Daalder's more intriguing ideas and comes off either too conventional or too aggressively weird."

Chris O'Neill reviewed the film for Experimental Conversations, stating that "Hysteria resembles a science fiction/horror hybrid and in the first 15 minutes director Rene Daalder displays a paired (sic) down, no-nonsense style of storytelling comparable to the sharpest of B features. [...] But it is clear from the outset that things are far from straightforward since the entire cast, both those portraying mentally-unstable patients and the figures who represent authoritative normality, are played with an overtly exaggerated theatricality." O'Neill also describes the film as "a heady mix of elements, and one's reaction might well alternate between frustration, bewilderment and amusement, but the film is never boring, thanks in no small part to the cast. McGoohan (in his last major theatrical role before his death in 2009) embodies the role of the renegade doctor with eccentric relish. [...] Plummer is typically off-the-wall and is allowed to be at her most unrestrained. Vaugier, receiving an 'and introducing' credit, is also equally uninhabited, both mentally and physically, as the young woman at the centre of the story. Maloney is left with the difficult task of representing the only 'normal' (and therefore vaguely sympathetic) character that the viewer can relate to: a fine and sometimes slippery line for an actor to walk, but he just about makes it."

The English site mondo-digital states that "Both heady and orgiastic at the same time, Hysteria wouldn't feel out of place running alongside a later Ken Russell film or, most pointedly, the cinematic freak out [The] Mansion of Madness. The film was obviously shot with a limited budget and sometimes suffers from erratic performances, but the sheer commitment to its loopy concept carries it along quite well. McGoohan is always a riveting presence in all of his scenes, [while] Maloney keeps a firm grasp on the increasing instability of his character."

Ian Jane on Rock! Shock! Pop! Dot Com claims that, "infused with some disturbingly effective moments of black comedy, Hysteria is as much a movie about dominance and power struggle as it is about an insane asylum." Jane also compliments that "the interiors [of the old gothic house that serves as the asylum] do a great job of relaying the madness inherent in the premise of the film", and that "there are a lot of little details that come together here to make this a pretty original movie. The ending feels just a tad too convenient but everything leading up to it is great." In conclusion, Hysteria is said to be "a strange mix of black comedy and gothic horror performed by a talented cast of decidedly quirky actors. It's really nicely shot and it's got plenty of atmosphere. A strange film to be sure, it's nevertheless an impressive picture."

Adrian Halen of Welcome to Daisyland - Horrornews felt that "'Hysteria' was indeed an appropriate title that sets the tone from start to end" as "the movie falls squarely into a b-movie category but in doing so also holds plenty of charm in its own right." Halen culminates saying that "the movie transcends its trappings and manages to come ahead with a clear message about human nature and what can be achieved past our own egos and isolation. [...] It's bizarre, its a love story, its a madhouse, its a message... all wrapped up in one."

=== Accolades ===
In 1998 Rene Daalder was nominated for the "International Fantasy Film Award" in the category "Best Film" at the Fantasporto International Film Festival.
