= Teen Lust (2014 film) =

2014 film

- Theatrical release poster
- Directed by: Blaine Thurier
- Written by: Blaine Thurier; Jason Stone
- Produced by: Kyle Mann
- Starring: Jesse Carere; Daryl Sabara; Annie Clark; Jon Dore; Emmanuelle Vaugier; Kristin Bauer van Straten; Cary Elwes
- Cinematography: James Liston
- Edited by: Mark Shearer
- Music by: Kathryn Calder
- Production companies: Independent Edge Films; Farpoint Films
- Distributed by: eOne
- Release dates: 10 September 2014 (TIFF); 14 August 2015 (Canada)
- Running time: 80 minutes
- Country: Canada
- Language: English

Teen Lust is a 2014 Canadian teen comedy horror film directed by Blaine Thurier and written by Thurier and Jason Stone. The film had its world premiere on 10 September 2014 at the Toronto International Film Festival and stars Jesse Carere, Daryl Sabara and Annie Clark.

== Plot ==
High school student Neil has taken an oath to remain celibate; an upcoming religious ceremony requires him to be a virgin. He is fully aware that his church is actually a Satan-worshiping cult, but only his parents and the other members know that this ceremony will involve actually sacrificing him to Satan. Not until during the ceremony, when Neil sees the dagger, does he realize what's about to happen, and he and best friend Matt narrowly escape. Cult leader Sheldon sends members Collette and Brad to bring them back.

Matt and Neil realize Neil needs to lose his virginity to be safe. The two go to Neil's friend and crush Denise; he frantically explains his situation and asks her to have sex with him. At first, she does not believe him, but when Brad and Collette show up at her house, she realizes Neil is right and helps him escape from the cult.

Matt and Neil show up at Cheryl's party to get Neil laid. He is confronted by two bullies from school, whom he humiliates via a magic trick. Impressed by this, Cheryl leads him upstairs for sex, but before it can happen, Denise shows up and warns him that Brad and Collette are close. Neil and Matt narrowly escape, but Denise is kidnapped.

Neil and Matt's next plan is to use prostitutes. At the brothel, Matt loses his virginity, but before Neil gets his turn, the place is surrounded by cult members, tipped off by the prostitute. Matt distracts them so Neil and Denise can escape in one of their cars. Denise and Neil confess their feelings for each other; she wants him right then. He pulls over into an alley so they can have sex, but he is overexcited and ends up climaxing before intercourse. The cult members catch up with them and capture them.

In a locked cell, Neil is ready to accept his fate. Matt is willing to offer himself for anal sex and take Neil's virginity if it will save his life, but before they can carry out the plan, they are taken to the altar room. Meanwhile, upstairs, Denise has knocked out Brad.

Neil is about to be sacrificed when Denise infiltrates the altar room and knocks over a large candelabra, igniting the drapes behind the altar. The cult members back up in a panic while Denise climbs onto the altar and has sex with Neil and Matt uses that same candelabra to keep everyone at bay. With Neil's virginity taken, the cult's plan is ruined.

Some time later, Neil's parents have become devout Christians. Neil and Denise are now dating, and Matt is off to "bible study" with 3 pretty girls.

== Cast ==
- Jesse Carere as Neil
- Daryl Sabara as Matt
- Annie Clark as Denise
- Jon Dore as Gary
- Emmanuelle Vaugier as Shelley
- Cary Elwes as Sheldon
- Kristin Bauer van Straten as Mary
- Hilary Jardine as Collette
- Jon Cor as Brad
- Amy Groening as Cheryl
- Ali Tartaryn as Ashley
- Matthew Enns as Kent
- Mackenzie Alton Johnson as Mac

== Reception ==
The Hollywood Reporter panned Teen Lust, writing that it was "Uneven as a straightforward comedy and never pointed enough as a send-up of religion or sexuality." Joe Leydon of Variety also panned the film calling it a "conspicuously uninspired mix of teen-sex comedy and horror thriller tropes" but praised Cary Elwes' acting. Fangoria was more positive in their review and gave the film two and a half out of four skulls, as they felt that the movie did have "a few big laughs and a great premise" and that "It might be a missed opportunity, but at least it’s not a blown one."
