= Ross Marquand =

American actor

- Marquand at Dragon Con in 2026
- Born: Roscoe Wayne Marquand; August 22, 1981 (age 45); Fort Collins, Colorado, U.S.
- Education: University of Colorado Boulder
- Occupation: Actor
- Years active: 2006–present
- Website: rossmarquand.com

Roscoe Wayne Marquand (born August 22, 1981) is an American actor and impressionist. He has played Aaron on the television series The Walking Dead (2015–2022), Red Skull and Ultron in various projects connected to the Marvel Cinematic Universe, and voices numerous characters in the adult animated television series Invincible (2021–present) and X-Men '97 (2024–present).

== Early life ==
Marquand was born in Fort Collins, Colorado. His initial foray into acting began at the age of nine when he played a small part in a church play. Soon thereafter, he joined the Boy Scouts of America (where he attained the rank of Eagle Scout) and began impersonating celebrities at campfire ceremonies.

According to Marquand, he suffered from bullying in his youth due to being part of "all nerdy things" such as the Boy Scouts, the student government and the chess club. When he was 11 years old, Marquand watched X-Men: The Animated Series and "fell in love" with the show, taking a particular liking for Wolverine due to all the pain and pathos within his character. Wolverine's line "There's no peace for me here. There's no peace for me anywhere" marked Marquand's life, making him feel like if he could convey a shred of what Cal Dodd could do with Wolverine, that's what he wanted to do in life, deciding to pursue acting.

While in attendance at the University of Colorado at Boulder, Marquand starred in several productions including To Kill a Mockingbird, The Passion of Dracula, and The Cherry Orchard. He graduated with a BFA (Bachelor of Fine Arts) in Theatre Performance.

== Career ==
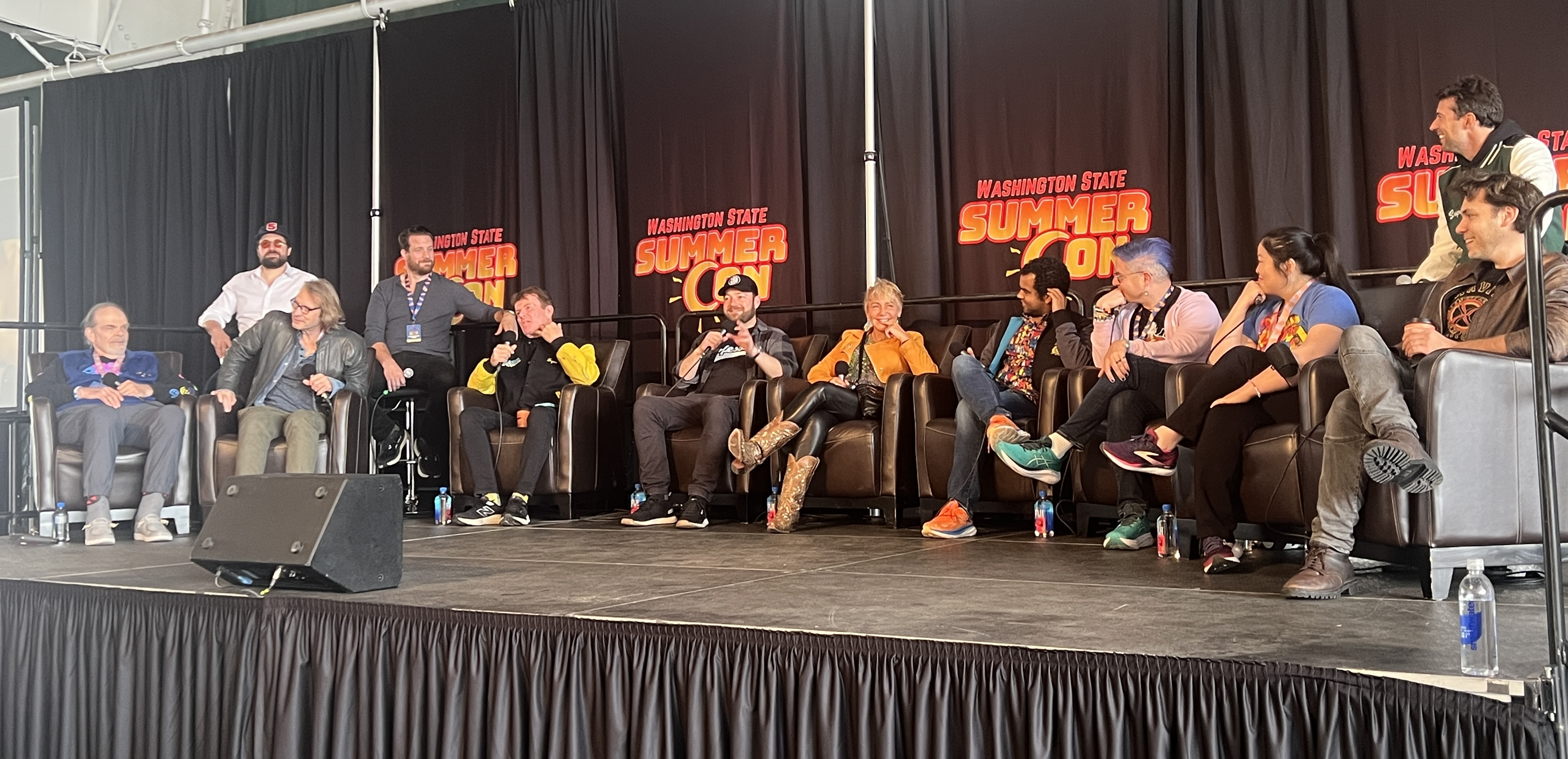
Ross Marquand (center) speaks surrounded by much of the cast of X-Men '97 at a convention in Washington state on June 22, 2025.

After college, Marquand moved to Los Angeles in 2006 and quickly garnered attention in several film and television projects. He played a crooked cop with entertaining gusto in The Sabi Company's Down and Dangerous (2013). Marquand portrayed screen legend Paul Newman on AMC's Mad Men. Marquand is best known for the recurring role of Aaron on The Walking Dead, the series' first gay male character.

Since 2018, Marquand has portrayed and voiced two characters in the Marvel Cinematic Universe: Red Skull in the films Avengers: Infinity War (2018) and Avengers: Endgame (2019), as well as Ultron in the virtual reality experience Avengers: Damage Control (2019) and as an alternate version of the character in the film Doctor Strange in the Multiverse of Madness (2022), replacing Hugo Weaving and James Spader. Marquand voiced both characters in the television series What If...? (2021). He voiced Professor X in X-Men '97.

An accomplished voiceover actor, Marquand has lent his talents to productions such as Phineas and Ferb, Conan, and video games like Battlefield Hardline. He is also known for impersonating a plethora of celebrities including Michael Caine, Sylvester Stallone, Justin Timberlake, Matthew McConaughey, and over 50 others. This expertise led to a starring and producing role on Pop TV's Impress Me, helmed by Ben Shelton and Rainn Wilson. He also voiced the titular character of Wreck-It Ralph in Disney Speedstorm, replacing both John C. Reilly and Brian T. Delaney.

== Filmography ==
=== Film ===
Year	Title	Role	Notes
2006	Love Sick		Short film
2007	Saturday Night Special	Aaron Nash	Short film
2007	The Deadening	Newscaster	Short film
2008	There Will Be Bud	Daniel Puffington	Short film, also executive producer
2008	Sex & Los Angeles	Detective	
2008	Kate Wakes	Neighbor	
2009	A Lonely Place for Dying	Nikolai Dzerzhinsky	Also producer
2009	The Inappropriate Behavior of Our Alleged Loved Ones	Eric	
2010	Happily After	Tristan	
2010	Woodshop	Gary	
2010	Slings and Arrows	Charley	
2011	The Congregation	John Christner	
2012	Eden	Max	
2012	Sabbatical		Short film
2012	Broken Roads	David Warwick	
2013	Down and Dangerous	Henry Langlois	
2013	Christmas Party Conversations: Part I	Angry Young Dad	Video short
2013	The Program	Michael	Short film
2014	Amira & Sam	Greg	
2014	Camera Trap	Jack	
2015	Une Libération	Jean	
2015	Spare Change	Mr. Hartman	
2016	Sheep and Wolves	Ziko	Voice
2018	Avengers: Infinity War	Red Skull (Stonekeeper)	
2019	Avengers: Endgame	Red Skull (Stonekeeper)	
2022	Doctor Strange in the Multiverse of Madness	Ultron Sentries	Voice
2025	Descendent	Sean	
2025	Tuesday's Flu	Jason McCutchen	

=== Television ===
Year	Title	Role	Notes
2006	LA Forensics	FBI Agent	Episode: "Under the Rug"
2009	I <3 Vampires	Siona's Publicist	5 episodes
2012	The Flipside	Actor	Episode: "Second Chance"
2013	Mad Men	Paul Newman	Episode: "The Flood"
2013–2014	Conan	Christopher Walken, James Gandolfini	Voice
2014	Phineas and Ferb: Star Wars	Han Solo	Voice
2015	Impress Me	Ross Marvin	Lead role, also producer
2015–2022	The Walking Dead	Aaron	Recurring (season 5), also starring (seasons 6–7), main (season 8–11); 70 episodes
2016	Deadbeat	Hugh Janus	Episode: "The Duchess of Stourbridge"
2017	Brockmire	Brockmire's Father	Episode: "Road Trip"
2017	The Last Tycoon	Prince of Wales	2 episodes
2018	Family Guy	Bob Costas	Voice, episode: "Griffin Winter Games"
2018–2021	Robot Chicken	Han Solo, Jack Reacher, Jerry Seinfeld, Ethan Hunt, Bob Belcher, Seth Brundle, Ian Malcolm, Red Skull, various	Voice, 7 episodes
2021–present	Invincible	Immortal, Rudy Connors / Robot, various voices	Voice, 17 episodes
2021–2024	What If...?	Johann Schmidt / Red Skull, Infinity Ultron, Sub-Ultron Sentries, W.E.R.N.E.R.	Voice, 6 episodes
2022	Lego Star Wars: Summer Vacation	Han Solo	Voice
2022	Beavis and Butt-Head	Lucas	Voice, episode: "Freaky Friday"
2024–present	X-Men '97	Professor Charles Xavier / Professor X, En Sabah Nur / Apocalypse, Victor von Doom / Doctor Doom	Voice, 15 episodes
2024	Megamind Rules!	Music Man / Metro Man	Voice, 2 episodes
2024	LEGO Star Wars: Rebuild the Galaxy	Han Solo	Voice

=== Video games ===
Year	Title	Voice role	Notes
2015	Battlefield Hardline	Actor	
2016	Star Wars: Trials on Tatooine	Han Solo	
2024	Disney Speedstorm	Wreck-It Ralph	
2026	Invincible VS	Robot, Conquest, Immortal	

=== Theme parks ===
Year	Title	Role	Notes
2019	Avengers: Damage Control	Ultron	
2022	Avengers: Quantum Encounter	Ultron	Show exclusively on the Disney Wish

=== Podcasts ===
Year	Title	Voice role	Notes
2020	Blockbuster	James Cameron	

== Awards and nominations ==
Year	Award	Category	Work	Result	Ref.
2013	Maverick Movie Awards	Best Supporting Actor: Feature	Down and Dangerous	Nominated	
2015	Maverick Movie Awards	Best Actor: Short	Une Libération	Nominated	
