= List of Finding Carter episodes =

Finding Carter is an American drama television series, which aired on MTV from July 8, 2014, to December 15, 2015. The series was created by Emily Silver, and stars Kathryn Prescott in the lead role of Carter Stevens, a young girl whose life is turned upside-down after learning that the woman she thought was her mother, abducted her from her biological family when she was three years old. With this newfound information, Carter is then returned to, and attempts to fit in with, the family she never knew she had.

All episodes of the first season are named after notable films of different eras. For the first half of the second season, all the episodes are named after notable songs. The second half of the second season features episodes named after novels. During the course of the series, 36 episodes of Finding Carter aired over two seasons.

== Series overview ==
Season	Episodes		Originally released	
Season	Episodes		First released	Last released
1	12		July 8, 2014	September 16, 2014
2	24	12	March 31, 2015	June 16, 2015
2	24	12	October 6, 2015	December 15, 2015

== Episodes ==
=== Season 1 (2014) ===
No. overall	No. in season	Title	Directed by	Written by	Original release date	US viewers (millions)
1	1	"Pilot"	Scott Speer	Story by : Emily Silver; Teleplay by : Emily Silver & Terri Minsky	July 8, 2014	1.69
Carter Stevens has a close relationship with her mother, Lori, but her world is turned upside down when she is told by Child Protective Services that she was abducted from her biological family at the age of three. She learns that her real name is Lyndon and is forced to return to the Wilsons, although she has every intention of reuniting with Lori. She meets her fraternal twin sister, Taylor, and her younger brother, Grant. While she begins to form relationships with her siblings, father, and Taylor's best friend, Gabe, Carter clashes with her biological mother, Elizabeth.
2	2	"The Birds"	Scott Speer	Terri Minsky	July 8, 2014	1.44
Carter becomes friends with a group of misfits at school who decide to help her mess with Elizabeth, who is obsessed with tracking down Lori. Elizabeth also insists that everyone show up to therapy, which infuriates Carter even more. Taylor begins to resent Carter re-entering their lives, as she is jealous of Carter's growing bond with Gabe and her "cooler" lifestyle. Grant is becoming attached to Carter and is afraid that she will leave them some day soon for her life back with Lori. After a night of intense partying, Carter lands in the hospital.
3	3	"Drive"	Rob Hardy	Heather Thomason	July 15, 2014	1.27
To get back at Elizabeth for constantly setting new boundaries in her life, Carter starts to hang out with Crash, a juvenile delinquent whom she met at the police station. Elizabeth tries to get her to date Max instead. On the flip side, Carter's relationship with her father becomes stronger. Meanwhile, Gabe, Bird, and Ofe do some research on Lori's aliases in hopes of locating her for Carter. They find someone, but it eventually leads to a dead-end. However, at the end of the episode, Lori is shown watching Carter hug her father from afar.
4	4	"Now You See Me"	Rob Hardy	Maria Maggenti	July 22, 2014	1.22
Carter and Bird have a fall-out because of a disturbing portrait that Bird created of Carter. Max decides to leave the Wilsons and on his way out of town, he runs into Lori, who tells him that she has been keeping tabs on Carter's family and is almost ready to get her back so they can runaway together. Meanwhile, David and Elizabeth are at odds over whether or not they can afford to buy Carter and Taylor a car. When David buys a car anyway, Elizabeth is forced to ask her parents for help and also resumes her affair with Kyle, with the intent of ending it with her husband for good. Max later returns to town and when he asks Carter about Lori, Carter forgets who she was for a minute and panics.
5	5	"The Heat"	John Terlesky	Elle Johnson	July 29, 2014	0.99
In hopes of finding Lori, Carter decides to spend some time with Elizabeth to learn a thing or two about policework. Knowing about the affair, David wants to divorce Elizabeth and cannot cash in a large check for his book until he does so. Carter takes Taylor to the sanctuary, where she learns to kiss during a game of spin the bottle. She also gives into her feelings for Max. Later, Lori approaches Max outside of the Wilson home and he tells her that Carter isn't her daughter and that he has to tell the family that she has been stalking them. Before he finishes his speech, however, Lori has disappeared once again.
6	6	"The Fugitive"	Rose Troche	Sam Wolfson	August 5, 2014	1.19
Carter decides to pursue a relationship with Crash, against the advice from her friends and family. She learns about his rough upbringing and when she finds out that he is set to spend a minimum of three years in prison, he suggests that they run away together. Carter instead wants him to face his problems head-on. Taylor accepts a date with Gabe, only for both of them to realize that they could never be more than just friends. She later decides to meet Max, who is distracted because Lori is back. Carter and Lori reunite, with Lori giving her instructions to leave the Wilsons.
7	7	"Throw Momma From the Train"	Jamie Travis	Sean Reycraft	August 12, 2014	0.94
Carter and Taylor celebrate their 17th birthday on the same day that Carter plans to run away with Lori. Taylor and Max try to convince her not to leave, while Crash wants to leave with her. Grant and Gabe overhear Elizabeth and Kyle talking about their affair. At the end of the day, Carter chooses to stay with her real family and tells David about Lori.
8	8	"Half Baked"	Jamie Travis	Heather Thomason & Sam Wolfson	August 19, 2014	1.12
David has arranged for Carter and Lori to have one last meeting, but Lori never shows up. Grant tells Taylor and Carter about their mother's affair. The girls confront Elizabeth and pressure her to admit the truth to David. When she does, he makes her move out of the house. Taylor gets stoned while hanging out with Carter, Max, and Crash. This causes them to forget to pick Grant up from school, leading him to calling Elizabeth. Carter ends up striking a deal with David in which she allows him to write his book, "Finding Carter", (which he had already written without her permission) if he decides against a divorce. Later, Carter finds out that David had lied to her about how they ended things with Lori.
9	9	"Do the Right Thing"	Jennifer Lynch	Emily Silver	August 26, 2014	1.01
Carter is devastated after finding out that David had already written "Finding Carter". This also causes a lot of tension between David and Elizabeth, who is on Carter's side. Taylor and Max try to take the next step in their relationship. Ofe seeks financial help from Bird after a betting mistake and she gives him one of her mother's necklaces to pawn off. When Bird's mother notices that the necklace has gone missing, Bird blames Carter and gets her arrested. Bird soon admits the truth and the charges are dropped, however, Crash had already bailed Carter out of jail and their whereabouts are unknown.
10	10	"Love Story"	Jennifer Lynch	Elle Johnson	September 2, 2014	0.97
When Carter refuses to return home, Elizabeth sends out an Amber Alert identifying her as a kidnapping victim, with Crash listed as the kidnapper. Carter and Crash decide to destroy their phones and start living off the grid. They visit Carter's old run-down apartment where Lori has left her a phone number. Carter wants to leave a message for Lori with Max. At the gas station, he expresses his disapproval of Crash and doesn't want her running off with him. Tired of waiting in the car, Crash barges inside with a gun and demands that Max give him all of the money in the register. When Carter tries to stop Crash, he ends up shooting Max in the chest. Carter immediately runs to Max's side and cries out to Crash for help, but he runs off instead. At the hospital, the Wilsons are waiting for news of Max's condition and the police show up to question Carter. Taylor is furious and tells Carter that she has done nothing but worsen their lives since she came home.
11	11	"The Long Goodbye"	Peter Lauer	Maria Maggenti	September 9, 2014	0.89
Max remains in serious condition and has entered into a coma. Elizabeth is in charge of the hunt for Crash. Meanwhile, Crash has been trying to contact Carter non-stop before he leaves town and she decides to meet him. However, Elizabeth follows her car and arrests him. Carter reconciles with Taylor and they go in to see Max. While they are hugging his eyes start to open.
12	12	"One Hour Photo"	Peter Lauer	Terri Minsky	September 16, 2014	1.00
When Elizabeth sees Carter with the number from her old apartment, she lets Carter know that it's actually a postal code and they trace it to a photo center in a neighborhood that Elizabeth and David used to live in. There, Carter picks up photos of her parents from three years before she was kidnapped, leading the family to believe that Lori had been their stalker for quite some time. Lori shows up at the Wilson home under the guise of a therapist while Carter is alone and is upset that Carter believes "their side of the story", although Lori won't exactly tell her the truth. She tells Carter to get it from David and gives her a photo of him that she supposedly took. It is suspected that Lori and David have a history, contrary to what he has told Elizabeth and Carter. Meanwhile, Max has woken up and finds it hard to come to terms with his current state of being. He breaks up with Taylor to not interfere with her life. When Carter finds out that Elizabeth had made plans to see her therapist, she tells Elizabeth about Lori. They arrive at the meeting location and Elizabeth tells Carter to wait in a nearby cafe while her squad attempts to capture Lori. However, Lori sends a drugged drink out to Carter and carries her out the back when she begins to black out. Shortly after, Elizabeth runs into the cafe, but the waiter tells her that Carter had left "with her mother" and Lori had already driven off, leaving Elizabeth in tears.

=== Season 2 (2015) ===
No. overall	No. in season	Title	Directed by	Written by	Original release date	US viewers (millions)
Part 1
13	1	"Love the Way You Lie"	Jennifer Lynch	Emily Whitesell	March 31, 2015	1.10
Four hours after her abduction, Carter wakes up in a motel room with Lori. When Carter finds out that Lori plans on kidnapping Taylor as well, Carter makes a run for it, but is quickly caught by Lori, who tearfully begs for one final chance - she forces Carter to text Taylor about a meet-up at a diner with the two of them alone. Informing her family of the text she received, Taylor gets wired with a recording device and walks inside with her mother, and Elizabeth finally confronts Lori with her daughters present. When they're all seated, Lori reveals that Carter and Taylor are actually her biological daughters, because she donated her eggs for Elizabeth and David to have children. Lori threatens Elizabeth with a gun unless she lets her leave with the girls. Carter then tampers with one of Taylor's wires, sending a signal to Kyle and David about a troubling situation. After a physical struggle involving the four adults, David is able to restrain Lori and she is finally arrested. Carter and Taylor are brought home and while they are still shaken from the news that Elizabeth isn't their biological mother, they insist that nothing's changed between them. Privately, however, they confide in each other at how to cope. Taylor and Max get back together after realizing breaking up was a mistake. As Lori is taken away, she tells Elizabeth David has deceived them and there is another truth he is keeping from them.
14	2	"Shut Up and Drive"	Scott Speer	Maria Maggenti	April 7, 2015	0.83
Taylor is desperate to get back to a state of normalcy, while Carter desperately seeks answers from Lori and David ends up telling her that he had a one-night stand with Lori while he was going through a rough patch with Elizabeth many years ago. He tells her to keep this information a secret from her mother until the time is right for him to reveal it himself. Meanwhile, Max runs into Crash, who attempts to apologize. He later shows up to Carter's "welcome home" party, where he is confronted by Carter for abandoning her and Max. Taylor is angry that Max wants to put the incident behind him and tells him that she loves him, but that they need to break-up for now. Lori is having her interrogation and admits that she had an affair with David when the twins were a year old and he was having marital issues. They had met at a park and later met up at a bar. Lori then claims that David was supposed to leave Elizabeth and take the twins with him to be with her, while David recalls something different and that Lori didn't express particular interest in the girls at the time. David and Carter head to the police station to tell Elizabeth everything, but it is revealed that Elizabeth heard Lori's entire interrogation and has found out about David and Lori.
15	3	"We Are Never Ever Getting Back Together"	Gavin Polone	Sean Reycraft	April 14, 2015	0.82
Since the reveal of David's affair with Lori 16 years ago, Elizabeth and David decide to separate. They agree to alternate with time spent at the house. Carter tries to mend the relationship between Max and Taylor by inviting him to a party. Taylor quickly becomes drunk whilst playing beer pong with the staff only to be rescued by Max who admits that he misses them. They kiss, however Taylor refuses to rekindle the relationship as she can't understand how Max can be so forgiving. Taylor then argues with Carter as the dean of admissions at Stanford seems more interested in Carter than Taylor who has a real want to attend there and for interfering in her love life with Max.
16	4	"Pretty When You Cry"	Gavin Polone	Joshua Senter	April 21, 2015	0.79
Bird finds out that her parents have committed mortgage fraud as the FBI comes to her house to seize belongings. Lori's ex-boyfriend, whom Carter remembers from her childhood, contacts her to testify and help Lori get placed into a mental health facility instead of prison. This puts Carter in a difficult position, as she wonders if Lori is indeed mentally ill or if she's being manipulated by Lori once again. Carter decides to help Lori, but she needs $2,000 to do so. Crash helps her out. When Carter and the psychiatrist visit Lori, Lori admits that she's not really crazy and just wanted to see Carter, but when she says that they can still get her old life together back, Carter sees that she is indeed in need of psychiatric help and leaves. Bird later throws a party to get her mind off of everything. During the party, Taylor feels uneasy watching new roommates Bird and Max hang out, which prompts her to hook up with Ofe. Joan sees that Grant is having a hard time dealing with his parents' separation, so she introduces him to her therapist friend.
17	5	"Wake Up Call"	Norman Buckley	Sam Wolfson	April 28, 2015	0.76
David, Elizabeth, and Carter have a meeting with the school guidance counselor, Abby, who informs them that Carter is in danger of flunking out of school. She also reminds them about the SATs the next day, which Carter scoffs at, as she never really saw college as a part of her future. Taylor and Grant finally find out about David and Lori's affair when Taylor finds the old photo of David in Carter's desk. Carter and Crash go on their first real date and head to the town fair afterwards, where they meet up with Taylor, Ofe, Bird, Max, and Grant. Carter also runs into Abby and restarts worrying about her future. Crash gets a call from his uncle, who needs help at the car shop, but he passes the job onto Max so that he can stay behind with Carter. When Max receives the car that he was supposed to get into the garage, he inspects the back and finds that it's filled with cocaine.
18	6	"Stay with Me"	Norman Buckley	Heather Thomason	May 5, 2015	0.66
Thinking that he has been set up, Max confronts Crash about possible illegal drug dealing, but Crash insists that he didn't know his uncle was participating in such activities. Carter arrives and takes Max's side, thinking that the $2,000 that Crash gave her before was from selling drugs. Grant is still seeing his therapist regularly and asks Taylor for advice when he considers going on anxiety meds. Taylor tells him that he has other options and the two share a bonding moment. Crash confronts his uncle Shay about the cocaine and Shay lashes out at him for exposing his operation by letting Max take care of the car. Carter happens to stumble upon the two arguing and gets dragged into it. Crash decides to leave Shay when he's threatened and Carter insists that he stay at the Wilson house under Elizabeth's protection, though Elizabeth hasn't forgiven him for his past wrongdoings. Taylor faints over at Ofe's due to taking some pills that she had stolen from him. Shay ends up finding Crash at the Wilsons' and after a short confrontation, they get him to leave. Crash tells Elizabeth the truth about his situation with Shay and the next day, the cops show up to raid the car shop, only to find that Shay has packed up everything and left. Not wanting to get the Wilsons into more trouble, Crash decides to leave them and enlist in the military.
19	7	"Something to Talk About"	Jennifer Lynch	Rayna McClendon	May 12, 2015	0.72
Carter begins to really worry about Taylor's recent behavior after they get in a car accident, for which Carter takes the fall because Taylor is still taking pills. Taylor is in charge of putting together a college information day in the gym and shows signs of cracking under the pressure. Taylor reluctantly hands over the night shift to Carter so that she can finish an important application. Bird stumbles upon Gabe having an affair with guidance counselor Abby. He begs her to keep it a secret, as Abby could go to jail for being with a minor. When the situation comes to light, Bird insists that she didn't tell, though Gabe doesn't believe her until he finds out that Abby's fiancé was the one who turned her in. Elizabeth is mad at Joan when she finds out that Grant was still seeing a therapist behind her back. He later tells his parents that he wants to move in with his grandparents.
20	8	"Riptide"	Jennifer Lynch	Jen Braeden	May 19, 2015	0.58
Carter is grounded for getting into the car accident while texting and driving. Taylor feels bad and wants to tell their parents the truth, but Carter tells her not to. Carter's old best friend Madison shows up at her front door, gets Carter to sneak out of the house and the two check out an apartment that Madison wants them to move into. Madison keeps speaking about Lori in a positive light and how Carter's life was full of freedom before the Wilsons. The constant negative talk about her family leads to Carter kicking Madison out of the house and going to stay with Bird temporarily. The arrival of Madison also brings up talk about a piece of Max's past that he had previously not divulged to Taylor. The family tries to hold a celebratory dinner for Elizabeth's birthday, the night seems to be ending well until Carter receives a call from Lori's facility saying that Lori had just tried to kill herself.
21	9	"I Knew You Were Trouble"	Jay Karas	Emily Silver	May 26, 2015	0.54
Even though her loved ones are trying to get her not to, Carter wants to meet with Lori. Max drives Carter to the psych ward to visit Lori, who is in a disturbed and depressed state. After Lori refuses to have a real conversation, Carter tells her that she still loves her and leaves in tears. Right after Carter walks out, Lori tells the nurse that she knew Carter would come when she got the news. Gabe lets Elizabeth know that Kyle wants to ask her to move in with them, which might be faster than Elizabeth wants to be going with the relationship. On the drive back from the visitation, Carter breaks down and Max pulls over to comfort her. The two end up sleeping together in the back of his truck and they realize their mistake when they wake up afterwards. Back at home, Taylor apologizes to Carter for not being more supportive regarding the events with Lori and Carter is left feeling even more guilty.
22	10	"Rumour Has It"	Rodman Flender	Maria Maggenti	June 2, 2015	0.69
Wanting to escape all of recent drama, Carter and Taylor invite Max, Bird, Gabe, Damon, and Madison to their grandparents' cabin for a weekend getaway. Max and Carter are feeling the weight of their secret and struggle to find the right time to tell Taylor. Carter ends up telling Madison about the hook up and word soon spreads to everyone except Taylor. Gabe insists that Taylor needs to know and gets a small fight with Max over the secret. Taylor tells Max that she still loves him and that they can work to get their relationship back to where it was. When it's his turn to speak, Max still doesn't tell her about him and Carter. The next morning, Taylor finds Carter's necklace in the back of Max's truck as they're clearing the gear and questions Max about it.
23	11	"Wrecking Ball"	Scott Speer	Sean Reycraft	June 9, 2015	0.53
Carter walks into the garage as Taylor is holding the necklace and blurts out that she and Max had slept together. David and Elizabeth are officially back together and they end things with Hillary and Kyle. The girls receive their SAT scores and David and Elizabeth decide to take everyone to dinner, though Taylor isn't in the celebratory mood. Crash and Max join the Wilsons at the restaurant for dinner and after Max makes a toast in Taylor's honor, she decides to get revenge on Carter by telling Crash about the hookup before Carter can. He's upset, but tells Carter to give him some time and that he'll see her in the morning. However, Shay has been keeping tabs on Crash and shows up in his hotel room. In the morning, Shay makes Crash say goodbye to Carter while they take him hostage on the road with them. Carter shows up to the hotel and finds his broken phone on the ground, prompting her to call Elizabeth for help. Elizabeth and Kyle are able to track Shay and Crash down at a car dealership. Crash is able to knockout Shay's sidekick, but when Shay is about to shoot Elizabeth, Kyle knocks him down from behind and gets shot in the neck in the process. Kyle later dies at the hospital.
24	12	"I'm Not the Only One"	John Terlesky	Emily Whitesell	June 16, 2015	0.56
Carter gets served with papers that tell her that Lori is going to be on trial and is seeking custody of her. Carter wants nothing to do with Lori and visits her to try to get her to accept a plea deal, but Lori is convinced that she will win the trial. Taylor and Max reconcile as she seeks his support during this difficult time. Elizabeth packs up Kyle's desk and pays Gabe a visit, where he exchanges some harsh words with her. After pushing aside his friends' offers of help, Gabe finally gives in and decides to stay with Damon for the time being. During the trial, Carter is called to the witness stand, where she admits that she might still love Lori and consider her to be a mother figure. The judge then calls for Lori's last-minute witness, Benjamin Wallace, who happens to be the boy that Carter had briefly talked to outside of the courtroom during the break. He gets up on the stand and claims that he is the son of Lori Stevens and David Wilson.
Part 2
25	13	"Native Son"	Scott Speer	Emily Whitesell	October 6, 2015	0.47
Carter is determined to get to know her new brother, Ben. David and Elizabeth come to blows over Lori's latest bombshell. Taylor is concerned about Gabe's methods of coping with his father's death.
26	14	"Anywhere But Here"	Anna Mastro	Salvatore Stabile	October 13, 2015	0.52
Loving her new secret job at the bar, Carter struggles to keep up with school until her double life becomes untenable. Taylor and Max attempt to celebrate a big anniversary, and Crash gets his new assignment.
27	15	"Rabbit, Run"	Jeff Melman	Heather Thomason	October 20, 2015	0.36
Carter is alarmed when Lori tells her shocking news about Ben. As Carter digs deeper into Ben's shocking secret life, Taylor urges Max to help Gabe get back on track.
28	16	"The Sound and the Fury"	Jeff Melman	Joshua Senter	October 27, 2015	0.49
Carter is still worried about where Ben is but then Elizabeth finds Ben and Gabe together in a jail cell. Carter continues to work in the bar where she and Jared are starting to get closer with each other. They start to kiss and something is starting to blossom between them which makes Carter feel that she has to tell him the truth about her age. Jared tells her that the bar isn't going so well and that they have money problems. So Carter starts an after-hours-party thing to make money. Eventually Carter tells the truth about her age to Jared.
29	17	"The Consequences of Longing"	Scott Speer	Elle Triedman	November 3, 2015	0.40
Carter is still working for Jared although he isn't speaking to her because she lied about her age. Carter catches Ben stealing from Jared so Carter threatens Ben that she will tell on him. Ben tells Carter's mom that she works in a bar so Carter's mom comes to the bar to shout at her. Jared thinks that it's one of his co-workers who stole from the bar so Carter is forced to reveal the truth that it was Ben who stole. Eventually Carter and Jared meet up outside somewhere and he says that he gives up, trying not to like her, and they kiss.
30	18	"She's Come Undone"	Brian Dannelly	Maria Maggenti	November 10, 2015	0.54
Bird's DJ-boyfriend has invited everyone to a house concert which everyone is excited to go to. Although Carter has other plans as she is looking forward to having her first real date and overnighter at Jared's. Although, after a little misunderstanding Carter ends up at the house concert anyway. Ben brings his foster sister to the party. This leads to a medical crisis that Carter and Ben have to try to sort out together. Carter goes to the bar and finds out Jared has prepared a romantic dinner for her.
31	19	"Never Let Me Go"	Brian Dannelly	Joshua Senter	November 17, 2015	0.47
Elizabeth is worried that she doesn't know so much about Carter anymore so Carter tells her that she's dating Jared. Elizabeth thinks that Jared is way too old for her which leads to Carter threatening to move out. Jared decides to close the bar early and have a barbecue in order to cheer Carter up. Carter ends up inviting Lori to the barbecue because she didn't want Lori to be alone on her birthday. Elizabeth does a background check on Jared, so she barges in at the barbecue and tells Carter that Jared is married. Carter feels that she needs a break from Elizabeth, so she moves out.
32	20	"The Heart is a Lonely Hunter"	Jonathan Frakes	Jen Braeden	November 24, 2015	0.36
Carter moves at Lori's place. She later finds out that Jared's wife works at a boutique down town so she goes there with Bird to check it out. Eventually Carter learns to trust Jared again.
33	21	"The Death of the Heart"	Jonathan Frakes	Sam Wolfson	December 1, 2015	0.30
Max is worried about his mother upon news of his abusive father's release from prison and Taylor accompanies him as he heads over for a visit with her. They are shocked to find out that his father is there with his mother and they appear to have reconciled. Max, however, is not convinced that his father has gone through any change and sets out to prove it. Carter catches Ben dealing drugs at her and Jared's new legal rave establishment and confronts him over it. The night takes a deadly turn when Seth is found dead from a molly overdose. Jared drags his body off of the property to avoid any responsibility for the events, despite Carter's pleas to tell the cops the truth.
34	22	"The Corrections"	Jeff Melman	Heather Thomason	December 8, 2015	0.36
Everyone rallies around Bird in the aftermath of Seth's death, while Carter tries to get to the bottom of the whole situation. She is convinced that Ben had given Seth the deadly drugs until Bird reveals that she was there when it occurred and Jared was the one who was actually dealing to them. Carter tries to get evidence against Jared, but Lori and Elizabeth get involved. The two women stage an ordeal at the bar and are able to get Jared to confess, letting both Carter and Ben off the hook. Bird tells her friends that she's pregnant.
35	23	"The Sheltering Sky"	Sharat Raju	Maria Maggenti	December 15, 2015	0.34
David returns home to find his entire family in chaos. They find out that Jared has been let out of jail, as he is willing to turn in a list of people that were involved with Rick and the drug-dealing. Carter later meets up with him and he promises to not mention Ben to the authorities, telling Carter that he still loves her. Carter tells him that it's best if they break up for good. The cops later show up to Lori's house to arrest Ben for his involvement. This leads Carter back to the bar to confront him one last time about going back on his word and their verbal tiff quickly turns physical. Carter hits her head on the counter and falls to the ground unconscious.
36	24	"Atonement"	Norman Buckley	Emily Whitesell	December 15, 2015	0.33
Carter awakens in the bar to find Jared dead, with Lori looming over her. As she tries to piece together what exactly happened to Jared, Lori confesses to his murder. Carter believes that Lori is actually innocent and is covering for someone. When the family finds out that Ben had run away en route to his group home, he becomes the main suspect. However, he is later found to have escaped to Max's apartment with no knowledge of the night's events. Taylor remains completely convinced that Lori is the real murderer as suspicions start pointing away from her. Meanwhile, David and Elizabeth are able to get custody of Ben. Ben later meets up with Rick and threatens him in the name of protecting the Wilsons, leading to a physical fight that ends up with Ben unconscious on the street. It is then revealed that Max was the one who knocked Jared to his death when he came upon Jared and Carter's altercation at the bar. Lori had come in as Max was trying to revive the man but told him to leave the scene before the ambulance came. In the end, the guilt of letting Lori take the fall becomes too much and Max turns himself in to the police, to Lori's shock and Taylor's devastation.
