= Return to Cabin by the Lake =

2001 film by Po-Chih Leong

- Movie Poster
- Directed by: Po-Chih Leong
- Written by: Jeffrey Reddick (based on characters created by); David Stephens
- Produced by: John V. Stuckmeyer
- Starring: Judd Nelson; Brian Krause; Dahlia Salem; Claudette Mink; Kandyse McClure; Emmanuelle Vaugier; JR Bourne; Will Sanderson
- Cinematography: Stephen M. Katz
- Edited by: Anthony Redman
- Music by: Frankie Blue
- Distributed by: USA Network
- Release date: August 14, 2001
- Running time: 89 minutes
- Country: United States
- Language: English

Return to Cabin by the Lake is a 2001 American crime comedy telefilm, starring Judd Nelson. It was directed by Po-Chih Leong. The movie is a sequel to Cabin by the Lake.

== Plot ==
Two years after being presumed dead, Stanley Caldwell (under the alias of "Alan") meets with an agent named Lauren on a boat to discuss a new screenplay. They soon learn that despite public protest, director Mike Helton has begun principal photography on Cabin by the Lake, a film based on Stanley's exploits as a serial killer. When Lauren confesses to hiring someone to rewrite his screenplay, Stanley binds her to a cement flower pot. A horrified Lauren realizes Alan's true identity and desperately suggests that he become a director. Although intrigued by the idea, Stanley pushes her overboard to drown.

Paul Parsons, the brother of deceased victim Kimberly Parsons, confronts Mike Helton on the set and demands that he cease the production, but is dragged away by security. Stanley then arrives in disguise, claiming that he owns the cabin where the film is being shot. While wandering the set, he bumps into screenwriter Alison Gaddis, who praises Stanley's work and is curious about his background.

Helton receives a call from J.C. Reddick, the producer's nephew and second unit director whom no one has ever met. Helton tells him he will send a plane for him at the airport. Stanley leaves the set and races to the airport while donning a new disguise. He collects J.C., then drugs and kills him on the lake. Posing as J.C. himself, Stanley returns to the set and once again runs into Alison. He claims to be acquainted with Stanley and gives her several details about him, mentioning his preference for strong women as victims. She invites him out for coffee at a later date, which Stanley accepts.

Helton unveils the indoor set for Cabin by the Lake: An enormous water tank almost identical to Stanley's original "garden". Tasked with shooting the underwater scenes, Stanley dons scuba gear and dives into the tank to tend his garden, infuriating Helton by ignoring his stage directions. Later, Stanley and Alison finally meet to discuss Stanley at length. He describes how Kimberly Parsons had fought the hardest of all his victims, remembering vividly how she had scratched and clawed him.

When Alison returns to the tank alone to continue writing, she is ambushed by an unknown person. Helton believes that Paul Parsons is responsible, in an effort to sabotage the production. Helton then discovers that Stanley has made changes to the script without his knowledge, further angering him. In turn, Stanley drugs Helton and buries him alive, using fireworks to cover his panicked screams. Stanley then takes over as director.

Paul confronts Alison about her part in the production and invites her to meet him at the bar to discuss his sister. He gives details of Kimberly's death that eerily correspond with those from Stanley himself, rousing Alison's suspicions. When she confronts Stanley, he gives her a drugged glass of wine that renders her unconscious. She awakens in Stanley's cabin basement, chained to the floor by her ankle just like all his previous victims. As he greets her with food, the scars on his forearm confirm his identity.

Paul repeatedly calls the set looking for Alison, but is told that she finished rewriting the script and went home. Stanley then falsely informs Paul that he is planning to scrap the production and invites Paul to meet him at the stage that night. Stanley directs the final scene of the movie, but secretly rigs a light fixture to fall into the tank and electrocute the actress inside. When Paul arrives afterward, Stanley frames him for the incident and sends him fleeing.

Stanley coerces the lead actors to come back to the set for one final shot, then returns to the cabin where a defiant Alison manipulates him into bringing her along. She tries to warn the two actors that Stanley is planning to kill them, but to no avail. Holding them at gunpoint, Stanley carries out his plan to drown Mallory's actress. As the actor playing Boone struggles to free her, Alison pushes Stanley off the platform before shooting the tank with Stanley's gun, flooding the stage. Paul returns to help, but Alison is recaptured by Stanley and forced into his car. While driving, Alison deliberately crashes the car and escapes, but Stanley recovers and pursues her back to the cabin.

Alison ambushes Stanley in the bathroom and knocks him into a bathtub full of water. After a brief standoff, she throws a hair dryer into the tub and electrocutes him. The police arrive with Paul but a search of the cabin yields no sign of Stanley. They find his boat on the lake, and Alison finds a watch he had stolen from J.C. on the dock. The police decide they will drag the lake tomorrow and try to reassure Alison that Stanley is dead.

A news report states that Cabin by the Lake was a surprise hit in its opening weekend, earning $36 million at the box office with a sequel already in the works. Alison and Paul have since started a relationship, but Alison still has nightmares about Stanley, who is shown reading the newspaper article about the film's success.

== Cast ==
- Judd Nelson as Stanley Caldwell
- Brian Krause as Mike Helton
- Dahlia Salem as Alison Gaddis
- Claudette Mink as Lauren Majors
- Kandyse McClure as Jade
- Emmanuelle Vaugier as Vicki
- JR Bourne as J.C. Reddick
- Will Sanderson as Chad

== Reception ==
The Los Angeles Times panned the sequel, writing, "Nelson is so resolutely expressionless, however--so completely lacking in charisma--that it's difficult to believe anyone could fall under his spell." In contrast, Michael Speier from Variety gave the movie a good review, writing, "USA’s “Return to Cabin by the Lake” is nothing like its predecessor — and that's a good thing. Campy to the max, this sequel to last year's highly rated telepic does away with the original's misogyny and replaces it with in-jokes about the Hollywood production process. Completely in tune with just how flaky showbiz types can be, this serial killer story is comfortable in the confines of feather-light, jokey fright".
