= Jesse Carere =

Canadian actor

- Born: June 6, 1993 (age 32); Woodbridge, Ontario, Canada
- Occupation: Actor
- Years active: 2011–2016

Jesse Carere (born June 6, 1993) is a Canadian actor. He is best known for playing Ofe, a recurring character in the MTV series Finding Carter. He is also known for his role as Adam Jones in the Netflix / City series Between. Carere also played Chris Collins in the MTV version of Skins and has appeared in various independent films.

== Personal life ==
Carere was born and raised in Woodbridge, Ontario, in the city of Vaughan. His parents are Milva and Vince Carere, and he is the eldest of four children. He loves cinema, and his favorite actors are Johnny Depp, Leonardo DiCaprio, Matt Damon, and Robert Downey Jr. Jesse attended St. Michael's College School in downtown Toronto.

Jesse dropped out of university to pursue acting full-time, saying college was not for him.

== Career ==
Jesse's first acting role was in a short called Money in 2006. Jesse's interest in acting led to his very first main role as Chris in MTV's version of Skins in 2011. For season 2 of Between Jesse was promoted to Managing Director, adding a behind-the-scenes role to his acting role in front of the camera.

=== Film ===
Year	Title	Role	Notes
2014	Teen Lust	Neil	Main role
2015	The Stanford Prison Experiment	Paul	

=== Television ===
Year	Title	Role	Notes
2011	Skins	Chris Collins	
2013	Cracked	Griffin Dunlow	Episode: How the Light Gets In (1.1)
2013	NCIS	Navy Seaman Eric Landis	Episode: Squall (10.19)
2014–2015	Finding Carter	Ofe	Recurring Character
2015–2016	Between	Adam	Leading Role (Throughout), Managing Director (Season 2)

=== Shorts ===
Year	Title	Role	Notes
2006	Money	Pickpocket #1	
2011	Skins	Chris Collins	

== Awards and nominations ==
Year	Association	Category	Work	Result	Ref.
2011	Gemini Awards	Best Performance by an Actor in a Featured Supporting Role in a Dramatic Series	Skins	Nominated	
