= Judd Nelson =

American actor (born 1959)

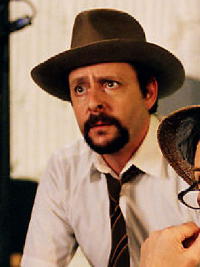
- Nelson in 2006
- Born: Judd Asher Nelson; November 28, 1959 (age 66); Portland, Maine, U.S.
- Occupation: Actor
- Years active: 1983–present
- Notable work: The Breakfast Club; St. Elmo's Fire
- Relatives: Merle Nelson (mother)

Judd Asher Nelson (born November 28, 1959) is an American actor. His roles include Hot Rod/Rodimus Prime in The Transformers: The Movie, John Bender in The Breakfast Club, Alec Newbury in St. Elmo's Fire, Alex in Cybermutt, Joe Hunt in Billionaire Boys Club, Nick Peretti in New Jack City, Billy Beretti in Empire, and Jack Richmond in the television series Suddenly Susan.

== Early life ==
Nelson was born in Portland, Maine, the son of Merle (née Royte), a court mediator and former member of the Maine House of Representatives, and Leonard Nelson, a corporate lawyer. He grew up in a Conservative Jewish home, although his family did not keep kosher. His father was the first Jewish president of the Portland Symphony Orchestra. He has two sisters, Eve and Julie.

He went to school at St. Paul's School in Concord, New Hampshire and Waynflete School. While at St Paul's School, an Episcopalian school, he started embracing his Jewish identity after experiencing antisemitism. He studied at Haverford College in Pennsylvania, leaving during his sophomore year. He subsequently moved to Manhattan to study acting with Stella Adler.

== Career ==
Nelson began acting in the mid-1980s, starring in Making the Grade (1984), and in Fandango (1985) opposite Kevin Costner. It was his roles in John Hughes's The Breakfast Club (1985) and Joel Schumacher's St. Elmo's Fire (1985) that made Nelson a star. He was affiliated with the Brat Pack of young 1980s actors, along with Emilio Estevez, Anthony Michael Hall, Rob Lowe, Andrew McCarthy, Demi Moore, Molly Ringwald, and Ally Sheedy. The "St. Elmo's Fire (Man in Motion)" music video – also directed by Schumacher – reached No. 1 in the US (1985). It was written by David Foster and John Parr and performed by Parr. Nelson appears in the video. He also appeared on a video for the Simple Minds' song "Don't You (Forget About Me)", from The Breakfast Club, in which members of the "Pack" feature prominently. A subsequent article in New York magazine, which focused primarily on the success of these films, resulted in the term "Brat Pack" being coined.

In 1986, Nelson provided the voice of Hot Rod/Rodimus Prime in The Transformers: The Movie and teamed up with Breakfast Club alumna Ally Sheedy for a third time in Blue City. He also provided narration for Bill Couturie's Dear America: Letters Home from Vietnam, a critically acclaimed war documentary that featured a cast including Tom Berenger, Robert De Niro, Willem Dafoe, and Matt Dillon. Film critic Roger Ebert praised the documentary, and it maintains a 100% rating on Rotten Tomatoes.

He starred opposite Burt Reynolds in the ABC Afterschool Special Shattered If Your Kid's On Drugs, which also featured Megan Follows and Dermot Mulroney. In 1987, he starred in the Bob Clark courtroom comedy From the Hip, which co-starred John Hurt and Elizabeth Perkins; he also provided a stand-out performance in Billionaire Boys Club, a courtroom thriller based on actual events; his performance earned him a Golden Globe Award nomination for Best Actor in a Mini-Series. In late 1988, he played Konstantin in Chekhov's The Seagull directed by Charles Marowitz at the Los Angeles Theatre Center, earning praise, as did the entire production.

Nelson closed the 1980s with the William Lustig thriller, Relentless (1989), in which he plays a Los Angeles serial killer hunted by two police officers (Robert Loggia and Leo Rossi); he provided a cameo in the Adam Rifkin road film Never on Tuesday (1989) along with Nicolas Cage, Cary Elwes, Emilio Estevez and Charlie Sheen; and appeared in Tommy Chong's Far Out Man (1989) with Rae Dawn Chong and C. Thomas Howell.

Key TV roles in the 1980s included Moonlighting (1986) – episode "Camille" – in which he played a police officer opposite Cybill Shepherd and Bruce Willis.

Nelson began the 1990s with a starring role opposite Max von Sydow in the World War II drama Hiroshima: Out of the Ashes (1990). The film focused on the horror of the Hiroshima bombing. It co-stars Mako Iwamatsu and Pat Morita. In the Fall of 1990, he appeared on stage in Chicago and New York in Jules Feiffer's Carnal Knowledge with Jon Cryer. He then worked for a second time with Adam Rifkin, this time starring in The Dark Backward (1991) with Bill Paxton. This quirky comedy featured fellow actor Rob Lowe, as well as Lara Flynn Boyle, James Caan, and Wayne Newton. Nelson plays the worst comedian in stand-up comedy history.

In 1991, he had a starring role in the Mario Van Peebles-directed New Jack City, an urban gangster film with Wesley Snipes, Ice-T, Vanessa A. Williams, and Chris Rock. The film was a commercial success. He then had a special guest appearance in the HBO TV series Tales from the Crypt – on the episode What's Cookin (1992) – with Christopher Reeve and Meat Loaf, followed by a starring role with Richard Jordan in the thriller Primary Motive (1992), and a similar role in Entangled (1993) opposite Pierce Brosnan, which was set in Paris.

In 1994, Nelson appeared with Brendan Fraser, Steve Buscemi, Chris Farley, and Adam Sandler in the comedy Airheads, with Gina Gershon in the psychological thriller Flinch, and with then partner Shannen Doherty in the thriller Blindfold: Acts of Obsession. Nelson wrote, produced, and starred in the thriller Every Breath in which he co-starred with Joanna Pacula. He headlined the Australian thriller, Blackwater Trail (1995), with Peter Phelps. He had a starring role on the NBC television sitcom Suddenly Susan (1996), which saw success for a four-season run. He had a starring role in the Shaquille O'Neal film Steel (1997), which became a commercial flop.

Nelson wrapped up the 1990s with another urban gangster thriller, Light It Up (1999), which featured an ensemble cast including R&B singer/actor Usher Raymond (in his first leading role), Rosario Dawson, Forest Whitaker, and Vanessa L. Williams. He played Alan Freed in the latter's life story, Mr. Rock 'N' Roll: The Alan Freed Story (1999) opposite Mädchen Amick and Paula Abdul.

Nelson appeared in such TV series as The Outer Limits (2000), CSI: Crime Scene Investigation (2006), CSI: NY (2007), Las Vegas (2007), Eleventh Hour (2008) as a psychologist researching soldiers returning from Iraq who suffer from posttraumatic stress disorder, Psych (2010), and a recurring role in Two and a Half Men (2010) with Charlie Sheen.

Other film credits include the psychological thriller Cabin by the Lake (2000), its sequel Return to Cabin by the Lake (2001), and a cameo appearance in the 2001 film Jay and Silent Bob Strike Back; the film's writer-director, Kevin Smith, had been a long-time fan of Nelson and the "Brat Pack" films. In 2002, he co-starred with Lauren Holly in Santa Jr. and reprised his role as John Bender in an episode of Family Guy (2007). Later, Nelson reprised his role of Rodimus Prime in Transformers Animated (2009) and appeared in The Boondock Saints II: All Saints Day (2009), the latter with Julie Benz, Billy Connolly, Sean Patrick Flanery, and Peter Fonda.

He portrayed Father Charley Lock on Brookwood Sleazebags (2010), a pilot he did for HBO. In 2012, Nelson played the role of Headmaster Nash in the live-action feature film Bad Kids Go to Hell, based on the graphic novel of the same name. The same year, Nelson co-wrote and starred in the short film The Spin Room: Super Tuesday. Nelson reprised his role as Rodimus in Transformers: Animated and voiced Ben 10,000, Eon, and Atomic-X in Ben 10: Omniverse.

In 2013, Nelson authored four books released on Kindle: The Power of Speech, Nine of Diamonds, The Gig, and Water Music.

Nelson played a pivotal role in the final season of Nikita.

Nelson played a lead role in the 2010 Hallmark movie, Cancel Christmas. He portrayed Chris Frost, who is also Santa Claus.

In 2019, he starred in the suspense thriller, Dead Water.

In 2021, Nelson starred as Don Cody in the Lifetime film Girl in the Basement which was inspired by the Fritzl case.

== Filmography ==
=== Film ===
Year	Title	Role	Notes
1983	Rock 'n' Roll Hotel	Rocker Johnny	
1984	Making the Grade	Eddie Keaton	
1985	The Breakfast Club	John Bender	Won – MTV Movie Silver Bucket of Excellence Award
1985	St. Elmo's Fire	Alec Newbury	
1985	Fandango	Phil Hicks, Groover	
1986	The Transformers: The Movie	Hot Rod / Rodimus Prime	Voice
1986	Blue City	Billy Turner	
1987	From the Hip	Robin 'Stormy' Weathers	
1989	Relentless	Arthur 'Buck' Taylor	
1989	Never on Tuesday	Motorcycle Cop	Direct-to-video; uncredited cameo
1990	Far Out Man	Himself	Cameo
1991	New Jack City	Nick Peretti	
1991	The Dark Backward	Marty Malt	
1992	Primary Motive	Andrew Blumenthal	
1993	Conflict of Interest	Gideon	
1993	Entangled	David	
1993	Caroline at Midnight	Phil Gallo	Direct-to-video
1994	Every Breath	Jimmy	Also writer and producer
1994	Hail Caesar	Prisoner One	
1994	Airheads	Jimmie Wing	
1994	Flinch	Harry Mirapolsky	
1995	Blackwater Trail	Matt Curren	
1996	For a Few Lousy Dollars	Hitman	
1997	Steel	Nathaniel Burke	
1999	Light It Up	Ken Knowles	
2000	Endsville	Rufus the Buck-Toothed Sluggard	
2000	Falcon Down	Harold Peters	
2001	Jay and Silent Bob Strike Back	Sheriff	
2001	Dark Asylum	Quitz	
2001	The Cure for Boredom	Max	
2002	Deceived	Jack Jones	
2003	White Rush	Brian Nathanson	
2005	Lethal Eviction	Shep	
2005	The Lost Angel	Father Brian	
2006	National Lampoon's TV: The Movie	Fear Factor Host / Judd	
2007	Netherbeast Incorporated	Steven P.D. Landry	
2007	Nevermore	Jonathon Usher	
2008	The Caretaker	Ella's Dad	
2008	The Day the Earth Stopped	Charlie	Direct-to-video
2008	A Single Woman	Jewish reporter	
2009	Dirty Politics	Billy	
2009	Little Hercules in 3-D	Kevin	
2009	The Boondock Saints II: All Saints Day	Concezio Yakavetta	
2010	The Terror Experiment (Fight or Flight)	Agent Wilson	
2010	Endure	Emory Lane	
2010	Mayor Cupcake	Donald Maroni	
2012	Bad Kids Go to Hell	Headmaster Nash	
2013	Down and Dangerous	Charles	Nominated – Maverick Movie Award
2013	Nurse 3D	Dr. Morris	
2014	Bigfoot Wars	Dr. Leonard Evans	
2014	Private Number	Sheriff Stance	
2014	Road to the Open	Anger Management Therapist	
2016	Stagecoach: The Texas Jack Story	Sid Dalton	
2018	Billionaire Boys Club	Ryan Hunt	
2018	1/1	Robert	
2019	Dead Water	San McLean	
2019	Santa Fake	Seb	
2019	Electric Jesus	Pastor Wember	
2019	Madness in the Method	Miscreant	
2019	Dauntless: The Battle of Midway	Rear Admiral Raymond A. Spruance	
2020	Iceland Is Best	Mr. Sondquist	
2022	The Most Dangerous Game	Marcus Rainsford	

=== Television ===
Year	Title	Role	Notes
1986	Moonlighting	Policeman	Episode: "Camille"
1987	Billionaire Boys Club	Joe Hunt	2 episodes Nominated—Golden Globe Award for Best Actor – Miniseries or Television Film
1990	Hiroshima: Out of the Ashes	Pete Dunham	Television film
1992	Tales from the Crypt	Gaston	Episode: "What's Cookin'"
1994	Blindfold: Acts of Obsession	Dr. Jannings	Television film
1995	Circumstances Unknown	Paul Kinsey	Television film
1996–1999	Suddenly Susan	Jack Richmond	71 episodes
1999	Mr. Rock 'n' Roll: The Alan Freed Story	Alan Freed	Television film
2000	The Outer Limits	Harry Longworth	Episode: "Something About Harry"
2000	Cabin by the Lake	Stanley	Television film
2000	The Spiral Staircase	Phillip Warren	Television film
2000	The New Adventures of Spin and Marty: Suspect Behavior	Jack Hulka	Television film
2001	Strange Frequency	Martin Potter	Television film
2001	Return to Cabin by the Lake	Stanley	Television film
2002	Lost Voyage	Aaron Roberts	Television film
2002	Cybermutt	Alex	Television film
2002	Santa Jr.	Darryl Bedford	Television film
2005	Three Wise Guys	George	Television film
2006	The Black Hole	Eric	Television film
2006	CSI: Crime Scene Investigation	Mick Sheridan	Episode: "Time of Your Death"
2007	Las Vegas	Ollie	Episode: "Fleeting Cheating Meeting"
2007	The Kidnapping	Glen	Television film
2007	CSI: NY	Cigarette Company Executive	Episode: "The Ride In"
2007	Family Guy	John Bender	Voice; episode: "Blue Harvest"
2008	Infected	Malcolm Burgess	Television film
2009	Phineas and Ferb	The Guru	Voice; episode: "Isabella and the Temple of Sap"
2009	Transformers: Animated	Rodimus Prime	Voice; episode: "TransWarped Part 1"
2010	Psych	Dr. Steven Reidman	Episode: "Death Is in the Air"
2010	Two and a Half Men	Chris McElroy	2 episodes
2011	Cancel Christmas	Santa / Chris Frost	Television film
2013–2014	Ben 10: Omniverse	Eon, Ben 10,000, Atomic-X	Voice; 5 episodes
2013	Nikita	Ronald Peller	2 episodes
2013	Kristin's Christmas Past	Glenn Cartwell	Television film
2015–2019	Empire	Billy Beretti	5 episodes
2017	Transformers: Titans Return	Rodimus Prime / Hot Rod	Voice; main role
2017	From Straight A's to XXX	Don	Television film
2018	Power of the Primes	Rodimus Prime / Hot Rod / Rodimus Cron	Voice; recurring role
2021	Girl in the Basement	Don Cody	Television film
2024	The Engagement Plan	Dash Donnelly	Television film

=== Music videos ===
Year	Title	Artist
1981	″As Above, So Below″	Tom Tom Club
1985	"St. Elmo's Fire (Man in Motion)"	John Parr
2012	"Gotten"	Slash featuring Adam Levine

=== Theatre ===
Year	Title	Role	Notes
1986	Sleeping Dogs	Henry Hitchcock	Mark Taper Forum
1986	Planet Fires	Sling and Bartender	Mark Taper Forum
1986	Orphans		Burt Reynolds Dinner Theatre, Jupiter, Florida
1986	Wrestlers		Burt Reynolds Dinner Theatre, Jupiter, Florida
1988	The Seagull	Konstantin	The Los Angeles Theatre Center
1988	Temple	Paulie	American Jewish Theatre, New York City
1990	Carnal Knowledge	Jonathan Fuerst	Martin R. Kaufman Theatre, New York City
2001	The Cocktail Hour		The Cape Playhouse, Massachusetts
2003	He She Them		The Shubert Theatre

=== Video games ===
Year	Title	Role	Notes
2026	Romeo is a Dead Man	J.E.H.	Voice; English version
