= Hole in the Wall (Justified) =

- Justified episode
- Episode no.: Season 4 Episode 1
- Directed by: Michael Dinner
- Written by: Graham Yost
- Cinematography by: Francis Kenny
- Editing by: Harvey Rosenstock
- Original air date: January 8, 2013
- Running time: 45 minutes

Guest appearances
- Patton Oswalt as Constable Bob Sweeney; Ron Eldard as Colton "Colt" Rhodes; Joseph Mazzello as Billy St. Cyr; Chris Chalk as Jody Adair; Brian Howe as Arnold; Jenn Lyon as Lindsey Salazar; David Meunier as Johnny Crowder; Abby Miller as Ellen May; Lindsay Pulsipher as Cassie St. Cyr; Alexandra Kyle as Roz; Casey Brown as Benny; David Ury as Hiram; Raymond J. Barry as Arlo Givens

Episode chronology
← Previous "Slaughterhouse"	Next → "Where's Waldo?"
- Justified (season 4)

"Hole in the Wall" is the first episode of the fourth season of the American Neo-Western television series Justified. It is the 40th overall episode of the series and was written by series developer Graham Yost and directed by executive producer Michael Dinner. It originally aired on FX on January 8, 2013.

The series is based on Elmore Leonard's stories about the character Raylan Givens, particularly "Fire in the Hole", which serves as the basis for the episode. The series follows Raylan Givens, a tough deputy U.S. Marshal enforcing his own brand of justice. The series revolves around the inhabitants and culture in the Appalachian Mountains area of eastern Kentucky, specifically Harlan County where many of the main characters grew up. In the episode, Raylan begins unconvering a 30-year-old mysterious case that may trace back to his jailed father. Meanwhile, Boyd's business is threatened by the arrival of a new church and he also reconnects with an old friend.

According to Nielsen Media Research, the episode was seen by an estimated 3.59 million household viewers and gained a 1.3 ratings share among adults aged 18–49. These numbers were higher than any episode of the second and third season and is the second most watched episode in the series. The episode received positive reviews from critics, who praised the lighter tone, new characters and new direction for the series.

== Plot ==
=== January 21, 1983 ===
A man picks up his newspaper in front of his house in the suburbs. As he is about to enter, he heads back outside when he hears a noise. He finds a dead parachutist in the street, with packages of cocaine surrounding him. The man tells his wife to call the police.

=== Present day ===
In the present day, Raylan (Timothy Olyphant) receives a phone call from a former acquaintance/romantic partner, Sharon Edmonds (Aja Evans), who is now a bail bondswoman in Knoxville, Tennessee. She enlists Raylan's help in finding a fugitive named Jody Adair (Chris Chalk), who is hiding out in Lexington and wanted by the Knoxville police. Raylan finds Jody at his wife's house after she refuses to let him and he prepares to take a gun from his car. He takes him into custody after a standoff in which Raylan subdues Jody by shooting the airbag in his Jeep, making it blow up in Jody's face.

Boyd (Walton Goggins) confronts Oxy dealer Hiram (David Ury) as he owes him money. Hiram claims that a newly-arrived preacher motivated him to turn religious and abandon his criminal life. Boyd causes an explosion outside and threatens Hiram to get the money or he will kill him. In Harlan, two teenage burglars, Benny (Casey Brown) and Roz (Alexandra Kyle), invade Arlo Givens' old house and start breaking into a wall. They see the bag with an ID for a "Waldo Truth" in the wall, and are about to take it when they see a car with police lights approaching. They run out of the house without the bag. Constable Bob Sweeney (Patton Oswalt) sees them but fails to catch them.

Bob alerts Raylan, who shows up at the house with Jody in the trunk of his car. He and Bob find the bag, which contains an ID for someone named "Waldo Truth", and Raylan stashes it in his trunk along with Jody. They leave the house, unaware that Benny and Roz are watching them. Raylan goes to a hardware store to inquire about Arlo's work on the house. He runs into Roz, who flashes him to distract him. She escapes and Raylan discovers that this was a distraction so they could steal his car. Meanwhile, Ellen May (Abby Miller) is visited by a constant client, Arnold (Brian Howe), who gives her an undisclosed drug. Arnold dresses in a bear costume, but Ellen May, under the influence of drugs, shoots him when she mistakes him for a real bear. Ava (Joelle Carter) reprimands Ellen May for her actions, although Arnold won't press charges.

Ava shares this information with Boyd and Johnny (David Meunier), whose condition has improved although he still needs to use a cane. At the bar, a client named Colton "Colt" Rhodes (Ron Eldard) arrives asking for Boyd. Ava and Johnny feign ignorance but Colt sees through their lies. He attacks Johnny and heads for Boyd's office, prompting Ava to take a shotgun. But when they enter the office, they find Colt and Boyd happily reunited as friends, as Colt worked on the military police and even arrested Boyd a couple of times before they turned friends.

Raylan, with Bob's help, tracks his car to a scrapyard, where Benny and Roz were headed to dispose of the car. They find the car but Jody is not in the trunk. Bob provokes a scrapyard worker who gets the upper hand on him while Raylan is gone to check on the whereabouts of Jody and the teens, who are hiding in a nearby shed. They release Jody from his handcuffs just as Raylan enters and Roz targets a gun at him while Jody tells her to kill Raylan. The situation escalates when Jody puts a gun to Roz' head. Bob stabs Roz in the foot and Raylan is able to get his gun and the bag back and arrests Jody once again.

Raylan visits Arlo (Raymond J. Barry) in prison to ask Arlo about the bag in the wall, as the teens were hired to retrieve it for him. Arlo claims not to know anything about the bag and leaves. Meanwhile, Boyd and Colt decide to visit Hiram once again for the money. They tie him at a chair with dynamite just as a fuse is about to kill him unless he gives them the money. Hiram finally gives the location of the money, which he intended to donate to the Last Chance Holiness Church. Boyd then tells Colt to "take care of him" and Colt kills Hiram. Boyd is surprised, as he meant that he would just untie him.

Boyd hides the money in the bar's ceiling. At the Last Chance Holiness Church, preacher Billy St. Cyr (Joe Mazzello) dances in front of the crowd with a snake in hand. One of the attendees is revealed to be Ellen May. In prison, Arlo is visited by an inmate, who is curious about the bag after overhearing Raylan. This prompts Arlo to kill the inmate for his knowledge of the bag.

== Production ==
=== Development ===
In March 2012, FX renewed Justified for a fourth season. Nick Grad, FX Executive Vice President of Original Programming, said "Justified is one of television's best series and this season has reinforced that excellence. Graham Yost and his writing team continue to deliver compelling material and richly drawn characters brought to life by the brilliance of Timothy Olyphant and our terrific ensemble cast. Their work is validated by universal acclaim, awards, and ratings that have grown every year. We look forward to many more seasons to come."

In December 2012, it was reported that the first episode of the fourth season would be titled "Hole in the Wall", and was to be directed by executive producer Michael Dinner and written by series developer Graham Yost.

=== Writing ===
The opening scene and mystery of the episode was inspired by the true story of Andrew C. Thornton II, a former narcotics officer and lawyer who became the head member of "The Company", a drug smuggling ring in Kentucky. While jumping out of a plane, he was caught in his parachute and ended up in a free fall to the ground. His body was found in the driveway of a Knoxville, Tennessee resident. The idea of a mystery was brought by the writers, instead of focusing on another "Big Bad" season. Waldo Truth's name was conceived by Yost "from a bad pitch" on 2012. The writers laughed at the name but eventually decided to use it.

Series developer Graham Yost previewed that Arlo would do something "shocking, and that it would set the mystery in motion." Yost said, "So if Arlo does something like that, it's probably not to save Raylan. I had originally pitched that Arlo would grab the guy and slashed his femoral artery, and Michael Dinner said, 'Yeah, that's pretty hard to read, I need him to go for the neck', and I said, 'Okay' and it became very bloody." Yost also teased the involvement of snakes in the episode, "Maybe this year, it would be fun to do something with a real backwoods snake-handling church. So the writers went to a church. The minister didn't feel a call that night to pull out the snakes, but there they were in the boxes on the side of the church."

=== Casting ===
Despite being credited, Nick Searcy and Jacob Pitts do not appear in the episode as their respective characters.

Starting with this episode, Natalie Zea is no longer credited as part of the main cast for the season, now deemed "recurring guest star". This was due to Zea's commitment to new series The Following. Recurring cast actor David Meunier, who plays Johnny Crowder was announced to return to the series in September 2012 despite his commitment to the new series Revolution.

In October 2012, it was announced that Patton Oswalt was cast in the recurring role of Bob Sweeney, "a local constable who went to high school with Raylan and has been hired by the lawman to watch Arlo's house." Oswalt viewed the character as "a guy that basically sorta wants to be Raylan Givens, but is not, which I think most men can relate to" On the same month, it was announced that Ron Eldard was cast in the recurring role of Colton "Colt" Rhodes, "a violent, dark-humored and rule-bending sergeant with the military police." Joseph Mazzello was also announced to join the series in the recurring role of Billy St. Cyr, "a preacher who has saved the lives of drug addicts."

=== Filming ===
Due to director Michael Dinner's unavailability but wanting to direct the first episode, this episode was the second episode filmed for the season.

== Reception ==
=== Viewers ===
In its original American broadcast, "Hole in the Wall" was seen by an estimated 3.59 million household viewers and gained a 1.3 ratings share among adults aged 18–49, according to Nielsen Media Research. This means that 1.3 percent of all households with televisions watched the episode. This was a 34% increase in viewership from the previous episode, which was watched by 2.66 million viewers with a 1.1 in the 18-49 demographics. This was also a 16% increase in viewership from the previous season premiere, which was watched by 3.07 million viewers with a 1.0 in the 18-49 demographics.

=== Critical reviews ===
"Hole in the Wall" received positive reviews from critics. Seth Amitin of IGN gave the episode a "great" 8 out of 10 and wrote, "So 'Hole in the Wall' was our little preview into Season 4. It was cool, calm, collective, well-written and showed we're in for some bigger things. This is gonna be a great season."

Scott Tobias of The A.V. Club gave the episode an "A−" grade and wrote, "Justified is coming off of a very good third season that suffered mainly in comparison to the show's even better second season, and it's continuing what I found to be one of the strongest elements of last season: the willingness to show Raylan as an entitled, exploitative son of a bitch." Kevin Fitzpatrick of Screen Crush wrote, "It's a relatively simple outing for Raylan Givens in Justified's season 4 premiere 'Hole in the Wall', but one we have every confidence in the series to expand and deliver upon."

Alan Sepinwall of HitFix wrote, "This is mainly a set-up for the many stories Yost will be telling this season, with the story of Raylan's bounty gone wrong to provide us some standalone satisfaction. That's the way Justified seasons tend to begin, and this was a very entertaining start." Chuck Bowen of Slant Magazine wrote, "Justified is the strongest, liveliest, and most tonally accurate adaptation of the writer's work to date, and the latest season bracingly suggests that isn't likely to change anytime soon."

Ken Tucker of Entertainment Weekly wrote, "The last-minute shanking Arlo performed in the closing seconds — this is one old coot who gives better than he gets — and I'd say Justified is off to a very good start." Joe Reid of Vulture gave the episode a 4 star rating out of 5 and wrote, "So Boyd's set up against the drug-dealing preacher boy. Raylan's got Arlo Givens Mystery Adventure to solve. And Ava's going to have to keep Ellen May from fucking it all up for everybody. Welcome to season four!"

Dan Forcella of TV Fanatic gave the episode a 4.5 star rating out of 5 and wrote, "Over the past couple years Justified has been my favorite drama on television. With its riveting performances, exciting story lines and endless charm, the series has received equally high praise from critics across the country. But if the Justified Season 4 premiere is any indication, this intense drama is likely to have a bit of a lighter feeling to it. There have always been comedic moments spread sporadically through Justified but with Patton Oswalt joining the fold, loads of comedy is likely to ensue." Jack McKinney of Paste gave the episode a 9 out of 10 rating and wrote, "In the end, the fourth season of Justified managed to start off with an effective blend of instant familiarity and an appealing freshness. That's a tough tightrope to walk. But, when you're talking about one of the best shows on television, more of the same is exactly what you want."
