= Slaughterhouse (Justified) =

- Justified episode
- Episode no.: Season 3 Episode 13
- Directed by: Dean Parisot
- Story by: Graham Yost
- Teleplay by: Fred Golan
- Cinematography by: Francis Kenny
- Editing by: Bill Johnson
- Original air date: April 10, 2012
- Running time: 40 minutes

Guest appearances
- Raymond J. Barry as Arlo Givens; Jere Burns as Wynn Duffy; Adam Arkin as Theo Tonin; Jim Beaver as Shelby Parlow; Demetrius Grosse as Errol; David Meunier as Johnny Crowder; Cathy Cahlin Ryan as Sally Jenson; David Carpenter as Captain Gene Reynolds; Cleavon R. McClendon III as Bernard; Abby Miller as Ellen May; Tyler Neitzel as Pete Jenson; Mykelti Williamson as Ellstin Limehouse; Neal McDonough as Robert Quarles

Episode chronology
← Previous "Coalition"	Next → "Hole in the Wall"
- Justified (season 3)

"Slaughterhouse" is the thirteenth episode and season finale of the third season of the American Neo-Western television series Justified. It is the 39th overall episode of the series and was written by executive producer Fred Golan from a story by series developer Graham Yost and directed by Dean Parisot. It originally aired on FX on April 10, 2012.

The series is based on Elmore Leonard's stories about the character Raylan Givens, particularly "Fire in the Hole", which serves as the basis for the episode. The series follows Raylan Givens, a tough deputy U.S. Marshal enforcing his own brand of justice. The series revolves around the inhabitants and culture in the Appalachian Mountains area of eastern Kentucky, specifically Harlan County where many of the main characters grew up. In the episode, Quarles is trying to escape from the police and Theo Tonin's hitmen while Boyd faces problems when his past comes back to haunt him.

According to Nielsen Media Research, the episode was seen by an estimated 2.66 million household viewers and gained a 1.1 ratings share among adults aged 18–49. The episode received very positive reviews from critics, who praised the resolution to Quarles' storyline, writing and twists. For the episode, writer Fred Golan was nominated for an Edgar Allan Poe Award for Best Episode in a TV Series.

== Plot ==
In the aftermath of the car bombing, Raylan (Timothy Olyphant) is told that Trooper Tom Bergen has died from his wounds, angering him. Boyd (Walton Goggins) tells him that Duffy (Jere Burns) was involved in the bombing and Raylan sends an all-points bulletin on Duffy. Boyd and Johnny (David Meunier) also confront Arlo (Raymond J. Barry) for locking Ava (Joelle Carter) in the basement, which he defends as "Helen" had him do it.

Raylan questions Duffy, going as far as to use the Russian roulette on him, scaring Duffy. Duffy confesses that Limehouse (Mykelti Williamson) set everything to get rid of Quarles. At a bridge, Limehouse and Boyd meet to finally conclude their business together. When Limehouse returns to the Holler, he finds Raylan waiting for him. Raylan threatens Limehouse but is overcome by Limehouse's hitmen surrounding them. Despite this, Limehouse offers to get rid of Boyd. Elsewhere, Quarles takes a family hostage and forces them to drive him in their car. He contacts Theo Tonin (Adam Arkin), who says that he must pay $500,000 to return home, but Tonin does not want him to continue working with him anymore.

Newly-inaugurated Sheriff Shelby Parlow (Jim Beaver) informs Boyd that the police and the Marshals received a tip about Boyd killing Devil and they will arrest him when they find the body. Shelby then proclaims that they are square after Boyd saved his life, cutting ties with him. Boyd, Ava and Johnny immediately suspect Arlo, given that his health has been deteriorating lately. Ava suggests that he flees but Boyd refuses to run anymore. Raylan, Mullen (Nick Searcy) and the Marshals arrive and arrest Boyd for Devil's murder. After the arrest, they are notified that Quarles has dropped off the mother, Sally Jenson (Cathy Cahlin Ryan) and is now with her children Pete and Mitch somewhere else.

Ava and Johnny start working on getting revenge on whoever may have told the police about Devil's murder. Johnny suspects Ellen May (Abby Miller) was involved as she met with Dickie, so Ava visits her to confront her. Ellen May does not cooperate, prompting Ava to assault her. However, Johnny is revealed to be in an alliance with Limehouse, who reported the murder to the police. Johnny wants revenge against Boyd for ruining his life. Limehouse also confronts Errol (Demetrius Grosse) for his constant betrayals and forces him to leave the Holler or face death.

Raylan is called by Quarles, who is forcing the elder son Pete (Tyler Neitzel) to drive the vehicle while he threatens his brother Mitch (Uriah Shelton). He forces him to meet with him and joins them in the car. They meet with Limehouse at the Holler, where Quarles threatens to kill the kids and Raylan if he does not give him $500,000. Limehouse is reluctant but Raylan convinces him as it would bring peace to him. Limehouse removes money from a pig carcass, to Quarles' joy. During this, Raylan mentions Trooper Tom's murder, surprising Quarles, as he didn't shoot him. Just then, Errol shoots at Quarles, who fires back. This gives time for Limehouse to take his butcher knife and chops off Quarles' left arm. With his dying breath, he reveals to Raylan that Arlo is the one who killed Trooper Tom.

Raylan and his team arrest Arlo in the night, taking him to the office. Before interrogating him, he shares a talk with Boyd in his cell, explaining that because of Arlo's association and Devil's murder, Boyd could face up to 20 years in prison. Boyd states that he saw a father figure in Arlo, deeming him part of his family. Raylan then goes to Arlo's interrogation, where he confesses to Trooper Tom's murder, but he also "confesses" to killing Devil to protect Boyd. Arlo is taken into custody while Boyd is released. The episode ends as Raylan visits Winona (Natalie Zea) at her sister's house to talk about his day. Before leaving, he tells Winona that he thinks Arlo just shot a "man in a hat" to protect Boyd and wonders if Arlo thought he was killing Raylan instead of Trooper Tom.

== Production ==
=== Development ===
In March 2012, it was reported that the thirteenth episode of the third season would be titled "Slaughterhouse", and was to be directed by Dean Parisot and written by executive producer Fred Golan from a story by series developer Graham Yost. Walton Goggins teased the finale by deeming it, "Different. Violent. And sad."

=== Writing ===
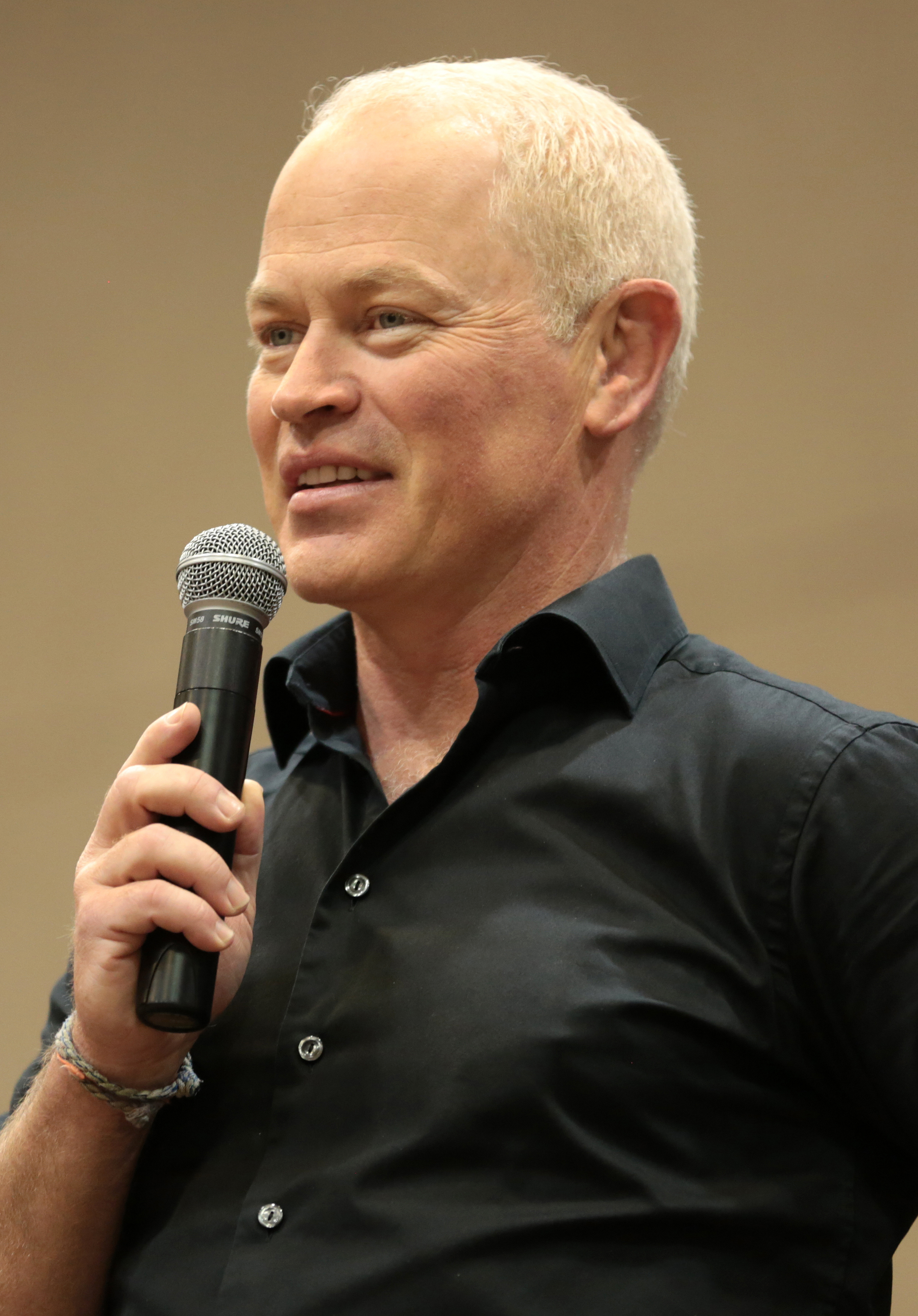
The episode marked Neal McDonough's final appearance in the series.

The final scene was an idea from Fred Golan while he wrote the episode, having consulted with series developer Graham Yost about it. About the idea of Arlo turning himself in, Yost said that it was because the writers didn't want Boyd in jail by the end of the season, "in our minds, it was just Arlo coming up with it himself. We had thought about having some kind of shot of Arlo seeing Boyd in the holding cell and a look passing between them — not necessarily that Boyd was giving instructions, but more that Arlo was just seeing Boyd and making a decision. But that idea of Arlo taking the fall was something Fred [Golan] came up with fairly early on, because we just felt it would be a really big screw you from Arlo to Raylan, as well as a sort of declaration of his affection for Boyd and his loyalty to Boyd." Arlo's actions were often reworked, with many involving Raylan questioning his father figure and who he may be when his child is born. Yost came up with the line, "I just saw a guy in a hat and I pulled the trigger", which impressed the writers.

Quarles' death was discussed by the writers, as many struggled in integrating his confession as they feared it would overshadow the scene where his character's arm was chopped off. Yost said, "I felt that the character moment was more important, so it needed to come late." Actor Neal McDonough questioned the decision, as his character would be bleeding and wouldn't make a confession as his last words. Fred Golan explained to him that he compared the scene to Messala's death in Ben-Hur, explaining that he is "just screwing with Raylan one last time." This convinced McDonough about the scene's meaning and purpose. Raylan was originally going to wield the cleaver to kill Quarles, per a suggestion from Olyphant. However, on the filming day, Olyphant suggested that it would be better if Limehouse was the one to kill him, which was accepted by the writers. Yost also revealed that they considered bringing Quarles back in the series, citing his rule that "unless you see someone zipped up in a body bag, they're probably okay." He said, "we talked about it. It just would have involved us spending more time in prison, because he would be in prison. It just never organically came into the story, much to my chagrin. Because I love Neal and I love Quarles."

Walton Goggins revealed on a 2015 interview that he pitched an idea to Yost where Boyd would die in the episode, saying "it was this beautiful trajectory, and I thought it was a fitting way to end this journey that I had hoped to continue on."

The episode was the first season finale of the series where "You'll Never Leave Harlan Alive" by Brad Paisley does not play. Yost said, "it just didn't fit for the last scene, because we didn't have someone dying or going off for vengeance. It just didn't play."

=== Casting ===
This was the last episode with Natalie Zea as a main cast member. In February 2012, she was announced to join the cast of the new series, The Following. Originally, Zea planned to leave the series after the second season but executive producer Sarah Timberman convinced her to renew her contract while she could look for other projects. The producers asked The Following's creator Kevin Williamson to carve out a schedule so they could get Zea on the series for the last episode of the season.

== Reception ==
=== Viewers ===
In its original American broadcast, "Slaughterhouse" was seen by an estimated 2.66 million household viewers and gained a 1.1 ratings share among adults aged 18–49, according to Nielsen Media Research. This means that 1.1 percent of all households with televisions watched the episode. This was a 8% increase in viewership from the previous episode, which was watched by 2.46 million viewers with a 0.8 in the 18-49 demographics.

=== Critical reviews ===
"Slaughterhouse" received extremely positive reviews from critics. Seth Amitin of IGN gave the episode a "great" 8 out of 10 and wrote, "'Slaughterhouse' was a little madcap for an ending, but it was still rational. That's why I'm not disappointed. Everything fell into place because the writers set the table beforehand and the episode paid off. It was action-packed. It was funny. It was clever. It was even a little moving at the end. Justified has become a great series."

Scott Tobias of The A.V. Club gave the episode an "A" grade and wrote, "For the most part, season three's best hours have been the most streamlined, like 'Thick As Mud' and 'Watching The Detectives', which attached themselves to really strong A-plots and relegated bits of the larger narrative to the periphery. Yet the series of payoffs in 'Slaughterhouse' are clean and immensely satisfying, both in terms of tension and suspense and servicing the many characters with skin in the game." Kevin Fitzpatrick of Screen Crush wrote, "Pour a bourbon out for Justified Season 3, y'all. The season may have lacked a bit of the emotional punch that last year had, and a particularly strong villain like Mags Bennett, but each season seems to bring Justified closer and tighter as far as being a well-oiled machine. And did we mention they chopped off Quarles' derringer arm with a frickin' meat cleaver?! An epic climax, and a bittersweet ending make Justified Season 4 feel far too long away."

Alan Sepinwall of HitFix wrote, "This was a fun season, but probably not as deep or tragic overall as the one before it. But then we come to the end, to Raylan with the woman he loves but can never be with for long, to the room where his unborn child will soon sleep, pondering the fact that his own father was once again willing to kill him, and some of that grandeur and pathos came back, big time. And this was a great close to the season." Luke de Smet of Slant Magazine wrote, "The major criticism of Justified's third season is that it's included a few too many plot elements. Especially in its latter half, season three has been a nonstop cavalcade of conniving and double crossing, and as such has, at times, been too busy to truly resonate. This was especially the case in last week's episode, which moved neatly from one plot point to another, wrapping up the story of the Bennett money. However, this week's finale, 'Slaughterhouse', is the sort of episode that can prompt a reexamination of an entire season's worth of themes and ideas."

Ben Lee of Digital Spy wrote, "Justified is done for the season, but 'Slaughterhouse' is one heck of a way to close it out. The death of Trooper Tom causes the authorities to execute a manhunt against Quarles while Raylan's father Arlo reveals where his loyalties really lie." Joe Reid of Vulture wrote, "I guess the question after 'Slaughterhouse' becomes: Can a loosey-goosey season like this be redeemed (for lack of a better word) by one righteously severed limb? Well... not quite. But it comes damn close."

Todd VanDerWerff of Los Angeles Times wrote, "'Slaughterhouse' can't redeem everything leading up to it, but it does its best to try, and it's helped immeasurably by the way that last week's episode cleared out a bunch of plot to give it some breathing room." Dan Forcella of TV Fanatic gave the episode a perfect 5 star rating out of 5 and wrote, "It was an exciting yet emotional end to Justified's third season. 'Slaughterhouse' definitely wrapped up some story arcs effectively, while allowing others to grow into new plots for next season." Jack McKinney of Paste gave the episode a 9.3 out of 10 rating and wrote, "Since this will be the last closing thoughts of the season, I'm making it an all dialogue celebration. The whole season has been rife with great lines, and the finale did not disappoint."
