= Dara Resnik =

American filmmaker

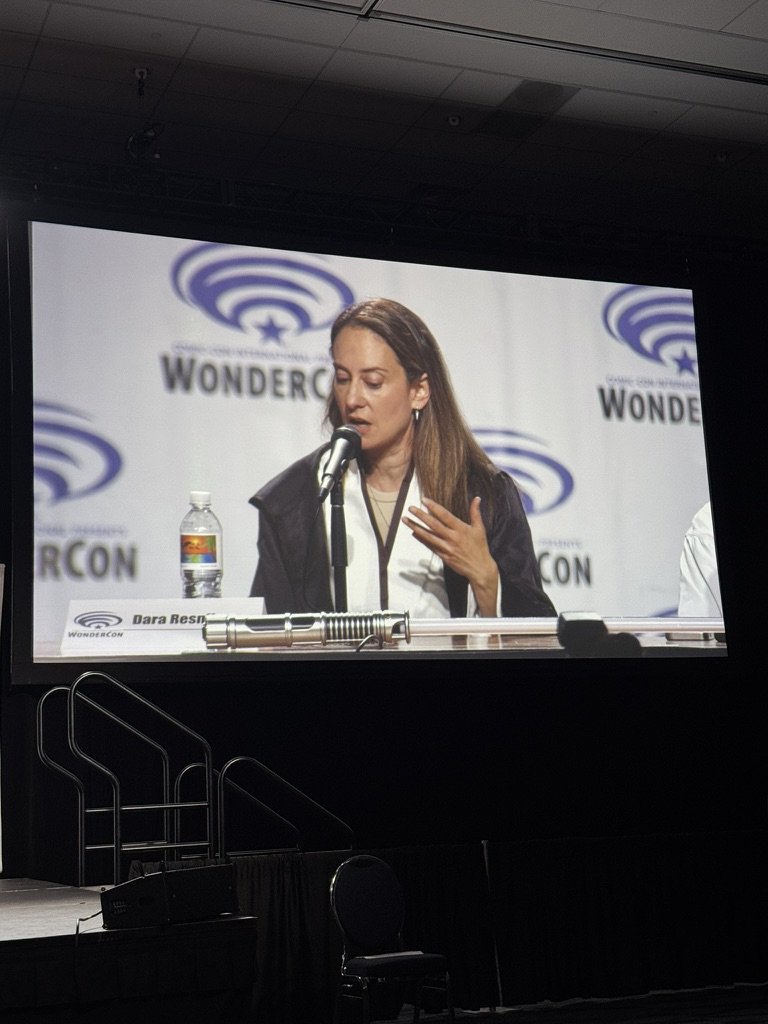
- Resnik in 2025
- Born: September 29, 1978 (age 47); New York, New York, U.S.
- Education: Tufts University; University of Southern California
- Occupation: Screenwriter
- Years active: 1996–present
- Children: 1

Dara Resnik (born September 29, 1978) is an American screenwriter, producer, and award-winning director involved in the writing and producing of television series I Love Dick, Marvel's Daredevil, and Shooter. She is the co-creator and showrunner of Apple TV+’s Home Before Dark.

== Early life ==
Resnik was born and raised in New York, New York. She is the daughter of Richard and Elise Resnik. Her father is a corporate and real estate attorney and her paternal grandfather was a Jewish immigrant from Russia who sold pianos including the prop pianos featured in the 1967 film The Producers.

Resnik attended The Dalton School and later earned a Bachelor of Arts in Economics and Communications from Tufts University and a Master of Fine Arts in Motion Picture Producing from the University of Southern California’s School of Cinematic Arts’ Peter Stark Producing Program .

== Career ==
Following a feature career as a writer for Legally Blondes and a co-producer on Sydney White, Resnik was a writer for Aaron Sorkin’s Studio 60 on the Sunset Strip in 2007 and the comedy series Pushing Daisies, which was nominated in 2008 for a Writers Guild of America Award for Best New Series.

Resnik later wrote and produced Mistresses and Castle for ABC Studios, Jane the Virgin for The CW, and USA Network’s Shooter. She was a co-executive producer for Marvel’s Daredevil series, which was released on Netflix in 2015, and Amazon’s series I Love Dick.

Resnik was the creator, showrunner, and executive producer, along with writer and producer Dana Fox, of Home Before Dark, a Paramount series for Apple TV+ inspired by real-life 12-year-old crime reporter Hilde Lysiak. The mystery drama series focuses on the experiences of a young woman returning to "the small lakeside town her father left behind."

Resnik is currently showrunning The Horror of Dolores Roach for Amazon.

Resnik is a faculty member of the Peter Stark Producing Program and the John Wells Division of Writing for Screen & Television at the University of Southern California and also teaches at the Sundance Institute Labs program.

== Awards ==
In 2004, Resnik's short film Great Lengths won two Gold awards at the WorldFest-Houston International Film Festival in the short film and short film director categories. Resnik was a writer for the comedy series Pushing Daisies, which was nominated in 2008 for a Writers Guild of America Award for Best New Series.

== Personal life ==
Resnik is a single mom. She lives in Los Angeles with her daughter. Resnik participated in the LA Marathon and is involved at IKAR, a Los Angeles-based progressive Jewish congregation.

== Filmography ==
=== Television ===
Year	TV Series	Credit/Role	Notes	Ref.
2007	Studio 60 on the Sunset Strip	Writer		
2007-2009	Pushing Daisies	Writer	Nominated – Writers Guild of America Award for Best New Series	
2007	Sydney White	Co-producer		
2013	Mistresses	Writer, producer		
2013-2015	Castle	Producer		
2015	Jane the Virgin	Writer, producer		
2016-2017	Shooter	Writer, producer		
2017	I Love Dick	Writer, producer		
2018	Daredevil	Writer, producer		
2019	Home Before Dark	Creator, writer, producer		

=== Films ===
Year	Films	Credit/Role	Notes	Ref.
2009	Legally Blondes	Writer		
2026	California Scenario	Writer		

=== Short films ===
Year	Short Films	Credit/Role	Notes	Ref.
2004	Great Lengths	Director	WorldFest-Houston International Film Festival Gold Award for Short Subject Film and Video WorldFest-Houston International Film Festival Gold Award for Independent Short Subject - Films & Video - Directing - Shorts	
