= Joy Gorman Wettels =

American film and television producer

Joy Gorman Wettels (born October 26, 1973) is an American television producer and founder of Joy Coalition. She is executive producer of Unprisoned, 13 Reasons Why and Home Before Dark.

== Early life ==
Gorman Wettels grew up in Yonkers, New York. A graduate of Barnard College at Columbia University, she was a member of the college's revue The Varsity Show. After graduation, she worked in casting and development. In 2002, she became a manager, with two clients: Dana Fox and Brian Yorkey, both of whom she had met through The Varsity Show. Subsequently, she worked with Yorkey on the musical Next to Normal on Broadway for over a decade.

== Career ==
Joy Gorman Wettels founded the production compoany Joy Coalition. She was previously a partner at Anonymous Content, where she worked with producer Steve Golin for 14 years.

Gorman Wettels executive produced Unprisoned, Tracy McMillan's semi-autobiographical exploration of the effects of incarceration on a family, starring Kerry Washington. The series debuted on Hulu March 10, 2023.

After producing the Netflix series 13 Reasons Why in 2017, she produced Apple TV+'s series Home Before Dark in 2020. She has also served as a producer on the films Seeking a Friend for the End of the World (2012) and The Meddler (2015).

In 2026, she executive produced the updated Little House on the Prairie for Netflix.

Gorman Wettels serves on the Advisory Council for UCLA's Center for Scholars and Storytellers and the advisory board for Hollywood, Health & Society at USC Annenberg's Norman Lear Center.

== Filmography ==
Year	Title	Role
2012	Seeking a Friend for the End of the World	Producer
2013	Adult World	Producer
2015	The Meddler	Producer
2017–2020	13 Reasons Why	Executive producer
2019	This is Personal	Producer
2020–present	Home Before Dark	Executive producer
2021	Eyes on the Prize: Hallowed Ground	Executive producer
2023	Unprisoned	
2026	Little House on the Prairie	Executive producer
