= List of Castle episodes =

Castle is an American comedy-drama police procedural television series on ABC which was created by Andrew W. Marlowe. It stars Nathan Fillion as Richard Castle, a famous mystery novelist, and Stana Katic as NYPD detective Kate Beckett. The series premiered as a midseason replacement on March 9, 2009. On May 12, 2016, it was announced that, despite several cast members signing one-year deals for a potential ninth season, the show would be canceled instead. During the course of the series, 173 episodes of Castle aired over eight seasons, between March 9, 2009, and May 16, 2016.

== Series overview ==
| Season | Episodes | Originally released | |
| Season | Episodes | First released | Last released |
|---|---|---|---|
| 1 | 10 | March 9, 2009 | May 11, 2009 |
| 2 | 24 | September 21, 2009 | May 17, 2010 |
| 3 | 24 | September 20, 2010 | May 16, 2011 |
| 4 | 23 | September 19, 2011 | May 7, 2012 |
| 5 | 24 | September 24, 2012 | May 13, 2013 |
| 6 | 23 | September 23, 2013 | May 12, 2014 |
| 7 | 23 | September 29, 2014 | May 11, 2015 |
| 8 | 22 | September 21, 2015 | May 16, 2016 |

== Episodes ==
=== Season 1 (2009) ===
| No. overall | No. in season | Title | Directed by | Written by | Original release date | Prod. code | US viewers (millions) |
|---|---|---|---|---|---|---|---|
| 1 | 1 | "Flowers for Your Grave" | Rob Bowman | Andrew W. Marlowe | March 9, 2009 | 101 | 10.76 |
| 2 | 2 | "Nanny McDead" | John Terlesky | Barry Schindel | March 16, 2009 | 103 | 10.97 |
| 3 | 3 | "Hedge Fund Homeboys" | Rob Bowman | David Grae | March 23, 2009 | 104 | 9.14 |
| 4 | 4 | "Hell Hath No Fury" | Rob Bowman | Andrew W. Marlowe | March 30, 2009 | 102 | 9.09 |
| 5 | 5 | "A Chill Goes Through Her Veins" | Bryan Spicer | Charles Murray | April 6, 2009 | 105 | 9.03 |
| 6 | 6 | "Always Buy Retail" | Jamie Babbit | Gabrielle Stanton & Harry Werksman | April 13, 2009 | 107 | 7.28 |
| 7 | 7 | "Home Is Where the Heart Stops" | Dean White | Will Beall | April 20, 2009 | 106 | 8.21 |
| 8 | 8 | "Ghosts" | Bryan Spicer | Moira Kirland | April 27, 2009 | 108 | 8.24 |
| 9 | 9 | "Little Girl Lost" | John Terlesky | Elizabeth Davis | May 4, 2009 | 109 | 9.97 |
| 10 | 10 | "A Death in the Family" | Bryan Spicer | Story by : Andrew W. Marlowe & Barry Schindel; Teleplay by : Andrew W. Marlowe | May 11, 2009 | 110 | 9.96 |

=== Season 2 (2009–10) ===
| No. overall | No. in season | Title | Directed by | Written by | Original release date | Prod. code | US viewers (millions) |
|---|---|---|---|---|---|---|---|
| 11 | 1 | "Deep in Death" | Rob Bowman | Andrew W. Marlowe | September 21, 2009 | 201 | 9.27 |
| 12 | 2 | "The Double Down" | Rob Bowman | David Grae | September 28, 2009 | 204 | 9.15 |
| 13 | 3 | "Inventing the Girl" | Dwight Little | Moira Kirland | October 5, 2009 | 202 | 9.23 |
| 14 | 4 | "Fool Me Once..." | Bryan Spicer | Alexi Hawley | October 12, 2009 | 203 | 9.77 |
| 15 | 5 | "When the Bough Breaks" | John Terlesky | René Echevarria | October 19, 2009 | 205 | 9.69 |
| 16 | 6 | "Vampire Weekend" | Karen Gaviola | Terri Miller | October 26, 2009 | 206 | 9.99 |
| 17 | 7 | "Famous Last Words" | Rob Bowman | Jose Molina | November 2, 2009 | 207 | 9.43 |
| 18 | 8 | "Kill the Messenger" | Jonathan Frakes | Terence Paul Winter | November 9, 2009 | 208 | 9.82 |
| 19 | 9 | "Love Me Dead" | Bryan Spicer | Alexi Hawley | November 16, 2009 | 209 | 10.53 |
| 20 | 10 | "One Man's Treasure" | Helen Shaver | Elizabeth Davis | November 23, 2009 | 210 | 10.31 |
| 21 | 11 | "The Fifth Bullet" | John Terlesky | David Grae | December 7, 2009 | 211 | 7.80 |
| 22 | 12 | "A Rose for Everafter" | Bryan Spicer | Story by : Alexi Hawley; Teleplay by : Terri Miller & Terence Paul Winter | January 11, 2010 | 212 | 9.47 |
| 23 | 13 | "Sucker Punch" | Tom Wright | Will Beall | January 18, 2010 | 213 | 9.48 |
| 24 | 14 | "The Third Man" | Rosemary Rodriguez | Terence Paul Winter | January 25, 2010 | 214 | 10.55 |
| 25 | 15 | "Suicide Squeeze" | David Barrett | Jose Molina | February 8, 2010 | 215 | 9.54 |
| 26 | 16 | "The Mistress Always Spanks Twice" | Tom Wright | Kate Sargeant | March 8, 2010 | 216 | 9.11 |
| 27 | 17 | "Tick, Tick, Tick..." | Bryan Spicer | Moira Kirland | March 22, 2010 | 217 | 12.21 |
| 28 | 18 | "Boom!" | John Terlesky | Elizabeth Davis | March 29, 2010 | 218 | 13.86 |
| 29 | 19 | "Wrapped Up in Death" | Bill Roe | Alexi Hawley | April 5, 2010 | 219 | 11.70 |
| 30 | 20 | "The Late Shaft" | Bryan Spicer | David Grae | April 12, 2010 | 220 | 12.68 |
| 31 | 21 | "Den of Thieves" | John Terlesky | Will Beall | April 19, 2010 | 221 | 10.39 |
| 32 | 22 | "Food to Die For" | Ron Underwood | Terri Miller | May 3, 2010 | 222 | 10.69 |
| 33 | 23 | "Overkill" | John Terlesky | René Echevarria | May 10, 2010 | 223 | 10.86 |
| 34 | 24 | "A Deadly Game" | Rob Bowman | Andrew W. Marlowe | May 17, 2010 | 224 | 10.07 |

=== Season 3 (2010–11) ===
| No. overall | No. in season | Title | Directed by | Written by | Original release date | Prod. code | US viewers (millions) |
|---|---|---|---|---|---|---|---|
| 35 | 1 | "A Deadly Affair" | Rob Bowman | Andrew W. Marlowe | September 20, 2010 | 301 | 10.70 |
| 36 | 2 | "He's Dead, She's Dead" | John Terlesky | Moira Kirland | September 27, 2010 | 303 | 11.08 |
| 37 | 3 | "Under the Gun" | Bryan Spicer | Alexi Hawley | October 4, 2010 | 302 | 10.83 |
| 38 | 4 | "Punked" | Rob Bowman | David Grae | October 11, 2010 | 304 | 10.66 |
| 39 | 5 | "Anatomy of a Murder" | John Terlesky | Terence Paul Winter | October 18, 2010 | 305 | 10.95 |
| 40 | 6 | "3XK" | Bill Roe | David Amann | October 25, 2010 | 307 | 11.32 |
| 41 | 7 | "Almost Famous" | Félix Alcalá | Elizabeth Davis | November 1, 2010 | 306 | 11.27 |
| 42 | 8 | "Murder Most Fowl" | Bryan Spicer | Matt Pyken | November 8, 2010 | 308 | 10.83 |
| 43 | 9 | "Close Encounters of the Murderous Kind" | Bethany Rooney | Shalisha Francis | November 15, 2010 | 309 | 9.98 |
| 44 | 10 | "Last Call" | Bryan Spicer | Scott Williams | December 6, 2010 | 310 | 7.63 |
| 45 | 11 | "Nikki Heat" | Jeff Bleckner | David Grae | January 3, 2011 | 312 | 9.61 |
| 46 | 12 | "Poof! You're Dead" | Millicent Shelton | Terri Miller | January 10, 2011 | 311 | 9.05 |
| 47 | 13 | "Knockdown" | Tom Wright | Will Beall | January 24, 2011 | 313 | 9.08 |
| 48 | 14 | "Lucky Stiff" | Emile Levisetti | Alexi Hawley | February 7, 2011 | 314 | 9.26 |
| 49 | 15 | "The Final Nail" | John Terlesky | Moira Kirland | February 14, 2011 | 315 | 8.75 |
| 50 | 16 | "Setup" | Rob Bowman | David Amann | February 21, 2011 | 316 | 8.99 |
| 51 | 17 | "Countdown" | Bill Roe | Andrew W. Marlowe | February 28, 2011 | 317 | 10.11 |
| 52 | 18 | "One Life to Lose" | David M. Barrett | Elizabeth Davis | March 21, 2011 | 318 | 12.03 |
| 53 | 19 | "Law & Murder" | Jeff Bleckner | Terence Paul Winter | March 28, 2011 | 319 | 12.56 |
| 54 | 20 | "Slice of Death" | Steve Boyum | Scott Williams | April 4, 2011 | 320 | 11.45 |
| 55 | 21 | "The Dead Pool" | Paul Holahan | Matt Pyken | April 11, 2011 | 321 | 12.33 |
| 56 | 22 | "To Love and Die in L.A." | John Terlesky | Alexi Hawley | May 2, 2011 | 322 | 12.11 |
| 57 | 23 | "Pretty Dead" | Jeff Bleckner | Terri Miller | May 9, 2011 | 323 | 12.60 |
| 58 | 24 | "Knockout" | Rob Bowman | Will Beall | May 16, 2011 | 324 | 12.93 |

=== Season 4 (2011–12) ===
| No. overall | No. in season | Title | Directed by | Written by | Original release date | Prod. code | US viewers (millions) |
|---|---|---|---|---|---|---|---|
| 59 | 1 | "Rise" | Rob Bowman | Andrew W. Marlowe | September 19, 2011 | 401 | 13.28 |
| 60 | 2 | "Heroes & Villains" | Jeff Bleckner | David Amann | September 26, 2011 | 402 | 11.67 |
| 61 | 3 | "Head Case" | Holly Dale | David Grae | October 3, 2011 | 403 | 11.18 |
| 62 | 4 | "Kick the Ballistics" | Rob Bowman | Moira Kirland | October 10, 2011 | 404 | 10.23 |
| 63 | 5 | "Eye of the Beholder" | John Terlesky | Shalisha Francis | October 17, 2011 | 405 | 11.23 |
| 64 | 6 | "Demons" | Bill Roe | Rob Hanning | October 24, 2011 | 406 | 10.81 |
| 65 | 7 | "Cops & Robbers" | Bryan Spicer | Terence Paul Winter | October 31, 2011 | 407 | 12.58 |
| 66 | 8 | "Heartbreak Hotel" | Bill Roe | Elizabeth Davis | November 7, 2011 | 408 | 11.07 |
| 67 | 9 | "Kill Shot" | David M. Barrett | Alexi Hawley | November 21, 2011 | 409 | 10.85 |
| 68 | 10 | "Cuffed" | John Terlesky | Terri Miller & Andrew W. Marlowe | December 5, 2011 | 410 | 8.12 |
| 69 | 11 | "Till Death Do Us Part" | Jeff Bleckner | David Grae | January 9, 2012 | 411 | 9.76 |
| 70 | 12 | "Dial M for Mayor" | Kate Woods | Christine Boylan | January 16, 2012 | 412 | 9.41 |
| 71 | 13 | "An Embarrassment of Bitches" | Tom Wright | Rob Hanning | January 23, 2012 | 413 | 10.05 |
| 72 | 14 | "The Blue Butterfly" | Chuck Bowman | Terence Paul Winter | February 6, 2012 | 414 | 8.70 |
| 73 | 15 | "Pandora" | Bryan Spicer | David Amann | February 13, 2012 | 415 | 8.86 |
| 74 | 16 | "Linchpin" | Rob Bowman | Andrew W. Marlowe | February 20, 2012 | 416 | 9.73 |
| 75 | 17 | "Once Upon a Crime" | Jeff Bleckner | Kate Sargeant | February 27, 2012 | 417 | 9.10 |
| 76 | 18 | "A Dance with Death" | Kevin Hooks | Moira Kirland | March 19, 2012 | 418 | 11.52 |
| 77 | 19 | "47 Seconds" | Paul Holahan | Shalisha Francis | March 26, 2012 | 419 | 11.87 |
| 78 | 20 | "The Limey" | Bill Roe | Elizabeth Davis | April 2, 2012 | 420 | 11.69 |
| 79 | 21 | "Headhunters" | John Terlesky | Alexi Hawley | April 16, 2012 | 421 | 11.23 |
| 80 | 22 | "Undead Again" | Bill Roe | Christine Boylan | April 30, 2012 | 422 | 11.08 |
| 81 | 23 | "Always" | Rob Bowman | Terri Miller & Andrew W. Marlowe | May 7, 2012 | 423 | 12.36 |

=== Season 5 (2012–13) ===
| No. overall | No. in season | Title | Directed by | Written by | Original release date | Prod. code | U.S. viewers (millions) |
|---|---|---|---|---|---|---|---|
| 82 | 1 | "After the Storm" | Rob Bowman | David Amann | September 24, 2012 | 501 | 10.45 |
| 83 | 2 | "Cloudy with a Chance of Murder" | Kate Woods | Elizabeth Beall | October 1, 2012 | 503 | 10.35 |
| 84 | 3 | "Secret's Safe with Me" | John Terlesky | Terence Paul Winter | October 8, 2012 | 502 | 10.61 |
| 85 | 4 | "Murder, He Wrote" | Rob Bowman | David Grae | October 15, 2012 | 505 | 10.94 |
| 86 | 5 | "Probable Cause" | John Terlesky | Andrew W. Marlowe | October 29, 2012 | 506 | 10.84 |
| 87 | 6 | "The Final Frontier" | Jonathan Frakes | Kate Sargeant | November 5, 2012 | 507 | 10.02 |
| 88 | 7 | "Swan Song" | David M. Barrett | Rob Hanning | November 12, 2012 | 504 | 10.07 |
| 89 | 8 | "After Hours" | David M. Barrett | Shalisha Francis | November 19, 2012 | 508 | 10.48 |
| 90 | 9 | "Secret Santa" | Paul Holahan | Christine Roum | December 3, 2012 | 509 | 8.50 |
| 91 | 10 | "Significant Others" | Holly Dale | Terence Paul Winter | January 7, 2013 | 510 | 8.66 |
| 92 | 11 | "Under the Influence" | John Terlesky | Elizabeth Beall | January 14, 2013 | 512 | 9.14 |
| 93 | 12 | "Death Gone Crazy" | Bill Roe | Jason Wilborn | January 21, 2013 | 511 | 8.82 |
| 94 | 13 | "Recoil" | Tom Wright | Story by : Rob Hanning & Cooper McMains; Teleplay by : Rob Hanning | February 4, 2013 | 513 | 8.89 |
| 95 | 14 | "Reality Star Struck" | Larry Shaw | David Grae | February 11, 2013 | 514 | 8.97 |
| 96 | 15 | "Target" | Bill Roe | David Amann | February 18, 2013 | 515 | 9.85 |
| 97 | 16 | "Hunt" | Rob Bowman | Andrew W. Marlowe | February 25, 2013 | 516 | 10.77 |
| 98 | 17 | "Scared to Death" | Ron Underwood | Shalisha Francis | March 18, 2013 | 517 | 11.26 |
| 99 | 18 | "The Wild Rover" | Rob Hardy | Terence Paul Winter | March 25, 2013 | 518 | 10.57 |
| 100 | 19 | "The Lives of Others" | Larry Shaw | Terri Miller & Andrew W. Marlowe | April 1, 2013 | 519 | 11.79 |
| 101 | 20 | "The Fast and the Furriest" | Jonathan Frakes | Christine Roum | April 15, 2013 | 520 | 10.18 |
| 102 | 21 | "The Squab and the Quail" | Paul Holahan | Story by : Jason Wilborn & Adam Frost; Teleplay by : Jason Wilborn | April 22, 2013 (Note: "Still" was originally scheduled to be broadcast prior to "The Squab and the Quail", but was rescheduled following the Boston Marathon bombing.) | 521 | 11.76 |
| 103 | 22 | "Still" | Bill Roe | Rob Hanning | April 29, 2013 | 524 | 10.53 |
| 104 | 23 | "The Human Factor" | Bill Roe | David Amann | May 6, 2013 | 522 | 10.84 |
| 105 | 24 | "Watershed" | John Terlesky | Andrew W. Marlowe | May 13, 2013 | 523 | 11.16 |

=== Season 6 (2013–14) ===
| No. overall | No. in season | Title | Directed by | Written by | Original release date (Note: Season six episodes 1–11, 15 and 16 were broadcast one day earlier in Canada. The remaining episodes of the season were broadcast the same day as ABC.) | Prod. code | U.S. viewers (millions) |
|---|---|---|---|---|---|---|---|
| 106 | 1 | "Valkyrie" | John Terlesky | Rob Hanning | September 23, 2013 | 601 | 11.46 |
| 107 | 2 | "Dreamworld" | Tom Wright | David Grae | September 30, 2013 | 602 | 10.88 |
| 108 | 3 | "Need to Know" | Larry Shaw | Elizabeth Beall | October 7, 2013 | 603 | 10.51 |
| 109 | 4 | "Number One Fan" | John Terlesky | Terence Paul Winter | October 14, 2013 | 604 | 11.11 |
| 110 | 5 | "Time Will Tell" | Rob Bowman | Terri Miller & Andrew W. Marlowe | October 21, 2013 | 605 | 10.59 |
| 111 | 6 | "Get a Clue" | Holly Dale | Christine Roum | October 28, 2013 | 606 | 10.69 |
| 112 | 7 | "Like Father, Like Daughter" | Paul Holahan | Marc Dube | November 4, 2013 | 607 | 10.87 |
| 113 | 8 | "A Murder is Forever" | Bill Roe | Chad Gomez Creasey & Dara Resnik Creasey | November 11, 2013 | 608 | 10.05 |
| 114 | 9 | "Disciple" | Rob Bowman | David Amann | November 18, 2013 | 609 | 10.93 |
| 115 | 10 | "The Good, the Bad and the Baby" | John Terlesky | Terri Miller | November 25, 2013 | 610 | 11.41 |
| 116 | 11 | "Under Fire" | Paul Holahan | Andrew W. Marlowe & David Amann | January 6, 2014 | 612 | 8.83 |
| 117 | 12 | "Deep Cover" | Tom Wright | Terence Paul Winter | January 13, 2014 | 613 | 9.03 |
| 118 | 13 | "Limelight" | Bill Roe | Rob Hanning | January 20, 2014 | 611 | 8.96 |
| 119 | 14 | "Dressed to Kill" | Jeannot Szwarc | Elizabeth Beall | February 3, 2014 | 614 | 10.02 |
| 120 | 15 | "Smells Like Teen Spirit" | Kevin Hooks | Chad Gomez Creasey & Dara Resnik Creasey | February 17, 2014 | 615 | 7.75 |
| 121 | 16 | "Room 147" | Bill Roe | Adam Frost | February 24, 2014 | 616 | 8.69 |
| 122 | 17 | "In the Belly of the Beast" | Rob Bowman | Andrew W. Marlowe & David Amann | March 3, 2014 | 617 | 8.38 |
| 123 | 18 | "The Way of the Ninja" | Larry Shaw | Story by : Christine Roum & Shawn Waugh; Teleplay by : Christine Roum | March 17, 2014 | 618 | 9.99 |
| 124 | 19 | "The Greater Good" | Holly Dale | David Grae | March 24, 2014 | 619 | 9.78 |
| 125 | 20 | "That '70s Show" | John Terlesky | David Amann | April 21, 2014 | 620 | 9.76 |
| 126 | 21 | "Law & Boarder" | Tom Wright | Jim Adler | April 28, 2014 | 621 | 10.39 |
| 127 | 22 | "Veritas" | Rob Bowman | Rob Hanning & Terence Paul Winter | May 5, 2014 | 622 | 9.00 |
| 128 | 23 | "For Better or Worse" | John Terlesky | Terri Miller & Andrew W. Marlowe | May 12, 2014 | 623 | 10.59 |

=== Season 7 (2014–15) ===
| No. overall | No. in season | Title | Directed by | Written by | Original release date | Prod. code | US viewers (millions) |
|---|---|---|---|---|---|---|---|
| 129 | 1 | "Driven" | Rob Bowman | David Amann | September 29, 2014 | 701 | 10.75 |
| 130 | 2 | "Montreal" | Alrick Riley | Andrew W. Marlowe | October 6, 2014 | 702 | 9.60 |
| 131 | 3 | "Clear and Present Danger" | Kate Woods | Chad Gomez Creasey & Dara Resnik Creasey | October 13, 2014 | 703 | 9.30 |
| 132 | 4 | "Child's Play" | Rob Bowman | Rob Hanning | October 20, 2014 | 704 | 8.82 |
| 133 | 5 | "Meme is Murder" | Bill Roe | Jim Adler | October 27, 2014 | 705 | 8.75 |
| 134 | 6 | "The Time of Our Lives" | Paul Holahan | Terri Miller | November 10, 2014 | 706 | 9.52 |
| 135 | 7 | "Once Upon a Time in the West" | Alrick Riley | Terence Paul Winter | November 17, 2014 | 707 | 9.38 |
| 136 | 8 | "Kill Switch" | Jeannot Szwarc | David Amann | November 24, 2014 | 708 | 9.55 |
| 137 | 9 | "Last Action Hero" | Paul Holahan | Christine Roum | December 1, 2014 | 709 | 8.45 |
| 138 | 10 | "Bad Santa" | Bill Roe | Chad Gomez Creasey & Dara Resnik Creasey | December 8, 2014 | 710 | 7.32 |
| 139 | 11 | "Castle, P.I." | Milan Cheylov | Rob Hanning | January 12, 2015 | 711 | 6.77 |
| 140 | 12 | "Private Eye Caramba!" | Hanelle Culpepper | Adam Frost | January 19, 2015 | 712 | 7.60 |
| 141 | 13 | "I, Witness" | Tom Wright | Terence Paul Winter & Amanda Johns | February 2, 2015 | 713 | 7.41 |
| 142 | 14 | "Resurrection" | Bill Roe | David Amann | February 9, 2015 | 714 | 7.43 |
| 143 | 15 | "Reckoning" | Rob Bowman | Andrew W. Marlowe | February 16, 2015 | 715 | 8.47 |
| 144 | 16 | "The Wrong Stuff" | Paul Holahan | Terri Miller | February 23, 2015 | 716 | 7.61 |
| 145 | 17 | "Hong Kong Hustle" | Jann Turner | Chad Gomez Creasey | March 16, 2015 | 717 | 8.95 |
| 146 | 18 | "At Close Range" | Bill Roe | Jim Adler | March 23, 2015 | 718 | 8.04 |
| 147 | 19 | "Habeas Corpse" | Kate Woods | Rob Hanning | March 30, 2015 | 719 | 8.16 |
| 148 | 20 | "Sleeper" | Paul Holahan | David Amann | April 20, 2015 | 720 | 8.34 |
| 149 | 21 | "In Plane Sight" | Bill Roe | Dara Resnik Creasey | April 27, 2015 | 721 | 8.31 |
| 150 | 22 | "Dead from New York" | Jeannot Szwarc | Terence Paul Winter | May 4, 2015 | 722 | 8.26 |
| 151 | 23 | "Hollander's Woods" | Paul Holahan | Andrew W. Marlowe & Terri Miller | May 11, 2015 | 723 | 8.44 |

=== Season 8 (2015–16) ===
| No. overall | No. in season | Title | Directed by | Written by | Original release date | Prod. code | US viewers (millions) |
|---|---|---|---|---|---|---|---|
| 152 | 1 | "XY" | Rob Bowman | Terence Paul Winter & Alexi Hawley | September 21, 2015 | 801 | 6.84 |
| 153 | 2 | "XX" | Paul Holahan | Alexi Hawley & Terence Paul Winter | September 28, 2015 | 802 | 6.70 |
| 154 | 3 | "PhDead" | Rob Bowman | Chad Gomez Creasey | October 5, 2015 | 804 | 6.76 |
| 155 | 4 | "What Lies Beneath..." | Larry Shaw | Barry O'Brien | October 12, 2015 | 803 | 6.78 |
| 156 | 5 | "The Nose" | Steve Robin | Nancy Kiu | October 19, 2015 | 805 | 6.67 |
| 157 | 6 | "Cool Boys" | Paul Holahan | Alexi Hawley | November 9, 2015 | 808 | 6.07 |
| 158 | 7 | "The Last Seduction" | John Terlesky | Rob Hanning | November 16, 2015 | 806 | 6.66 |
| 159 | 8 | "Mr. & Mrs. Castle" | Jeff Bleckner | Christine Roum | November 23, 2015 | 807 | 6.65 |
| 160 | 9 | "Tone Death" | Hanelle Culpepper | Robert Bella | February 8, 2016 | 809 | 5.72 |
| 161 | 10 | "Witness for the Prosecution" | Bill Roe | Terence Paul Winter | February 14, 2016 | 810 | 4.19 |
| 162 | 11 | "Dead Red" | Jeannot Szwarc | Jim Adler | February 15, 2016 | 811 | 5.15 |
| 163 | 12 | "The Blame Game" | Jessica Yu | Michal Zebede | February 22, 2016 | 812 | 5.48 |
| 164 | 13 | "And Justice for All" | Kate Woods | Adam Frost | February 29, 2016 | 813 | 5.26 |
| 165 | 14 | "The G.D.S." | John Terlesky | Alexi Hawley | March 7, 2016 | 814 | 5.68 |
| 166 | 15 | "Fidelis Ad Mortem" | Rob Bowman | Chad Gomez Creasey | March 21, 2016 | 815 | 6.50 |
| 167 | 16 | "Heartbreaker" | Tom Wright | Barry O'Brien | April 4, 2016 | 816 | 6.90 |
| 168 | 17 | "Death Wish" | Bill Roe | Stephanie Hicks | April 11, 2016 | 817 | 6.44 |
| 169 | 18 | "Backstabber" | Jessica Yu | Robert Bella | April 18, 2016 | 818 | 5.86 |
| 170 | 19 | "Dead Again" | Bill Roe | Rob Hanning | April 25, 2016 | 819 | 6.19 |
| 171 | 20 | "Much Ado About Murder" | Hanelle Culpepper | Christine Roum | May 2, 2016 | 820 | 6.03 |
| 172 | 21 | "Hell to Pay" | John Terlesky | Story by : Jim Adler; Teleplay by : Adam Frost & Nancy Kiu | May 9, 2016 | 821 | 6.74 |
| 173 | 22 | "Crossfire" | Rob Bowman | Alexi Hawley & Terence Paul Winter | May 16, 2016 | 822 | 7.65 |
