= Where's Waldo? (Justified) =

- Justified episode
- Episode no.: Season 4 Episode 2
- Directed by: Bill Johnson
- Written by: Dave Andron
- Cinematography by: Francis Kenny
- Editing by: Steve Polivka
- Original air date: January 15, 2013
- Running time: 40 minutes

Guest appearances
- Jere Burns as Wynn Duffy; Ron Eldard as Colton "Colt" Rhodes; Joseph Mazzello as Billy St. Cyr; Robert Baker as Randall Kusik; Jim Beaver as Sheriff Shelby Parlow; Josh Close as Joe Hoppus; Dave Florek as Harold Shawn; Beth Grant as Mother Truth; Jenn Lyon as Lindsey Salazar; David Meunier as Johnny Crowder; Abby Miller as Ellen May; Lindsay Pulsipher as Cassie St. Cyr; Don Harvey as Patrick Massett; Ethan Jamieson as Milo Truth; Ted Welch as Jed Truth

Episode chronology
← Previous "Hole in the Wall"	Next → "Truth and Consequences"
- Justified (season 4)

"Where's Waldo?" is the second episode of the fourth season of the American Neo-Western television series Justified. It is the 41st overall episode of the series and was written by co-executive producer Dave Andron and directed by Bill Johnson. It originally aired on FX on January 15, 2013.

The series is based on Elmore Leonard's stories about the character Raylan Givens, particularly "Fire in the Hole", which serves as the basis for the episode. The series follows Raylan Givens, a tough deputy U.S. Marshal enforcing his own brand of justice. The series revolves around the inhabitants and culture in the Appalachian Mountains area of eastern Kentucky, specifically Harlan County where many of the main characters grew up. In the episode, Raylan, Mullen and Tim start investigating the origin of "Waldo Truth" and why was so important to Arlo. Meanwhile, Boyd starts running into trouble with preacher Billy St. Cyr.

According to Nielsen Media Research, the episode was seen by an estimated 2.45 million household viewers and gained a 0.9 ratings share among adults aged 18–49. The episode received universal acclaim from critics, who praised the writing, acting, character development, humor and building momentum for the season.

== Plot ==
Raylan (Timothy Olyphant) is informed by Art (Nick Searcy) that Arlo killed an inmate in prison for his knowledge of the bag. Meanwhile, Ellen May (Abby Miller) claims to have found a new direction in her life thanks to the Last Chance Holiness Church, but Ava (Joelle Carter) tells her to focus on her job. Ellen May visits preacher Billy St. Cyr (Joe Mazzello), who convinces her to stay in the congregation.

Boyd (Walton Goggins) is annoyed when the Church choir children stop by his installations, impacting his business. He consults with Sheriff Shelby Parlow (Jim Beaver) about the Church. Shelby explains that Billy and his sister Cassie (Lindsay Pulsipher) have worked on the church, which has been moving around cities for the past months without any illegal activities reports. But Boyd suspects they are behind something. He and Colt (Ron Eldard) confront Billy at his congregation, in front of the crowd. Boyd questions his intentions and wanting to take advantage of the citizens. Billy then proclaims that the Church won't accept any money, which earns him support.

At the office, Raylan talks with Art and Tim (Jacob Pitts) about the content of the bag. They also discover something: Waldo Truth has been collecting social security checks for 30 years, but the Marshals think he's dead. This means someone has been cashing federal checks unlawfully, which makes finding Waldo Truth the purview of the US Marshals. Together with his colleagues, Raylan tracks down Waldo Truth's family. The Truth family tells them the last time they saw Waldo Truth was when he left with an airplane pilot named Drew Thompson. Art immediately suggests they leave, as he recognizes the name.

Boyd meets with Johnny and Ava and shares his theory that Cassie is running the Church and they set to find out anything about her. Boyd also welcomes Wynn Duffy (Jere Burns) in the bar as they previously caught a dealer that worked for the Dixie Mafia. Duffy acknowledges that he works for him. When Boyd offers a partnership, Duffy refuses for a lack of trust, but he also kills the dealer for failing to respect Boyd's territory. Before leaving, Duffy informs Boyd about Arlo killing an inmate in prison, surprising him.

At the office, Art discloses with Raylan and Tim that he remembers the case about the dead parachutist, who authorities originally identified as Drew Thompson. But the visit to the Truths actually solved something for him: the dead parachutist was not Thompson, but in fact Waldo Truth. Later that night, Raylan talks with Lindsey (Jenn Lyon) when a man named Randall Kusik (Robert Baker) enters. Raylan and Randall previously had a confrontation earlier that day and Raylan tells him to leave. However, Randall reveals he was looking for Lindsey because he is her ex-husband, shocking Raylan.

== Production ==
=== Development ===
In December 2012, it was reported that the second episode of the fourth season would be titled "Where's Waldo?", and was to be directed by Bill Johnson and written by co-executive producer Dave Andron.

=== Writing ===
Series developer Graham Yost addressed a plotline in the episode involving Art Mullen: in the United States Marshals Service, the mandatory retirement age is 57 and the character is revealed to be 56 in the episode, which is also mentioned. Yost said, "in our world, we're now in our fourth season and the whole timeline of the Justified story really has taken place over maybe six months, or at most a year. So, in other words, don't think that we're going to be having a retirement party for Art Mullen anytime soon, but at least it's on the table."

Yost previewed Colt's role in the episode, "he's smart, he's observant — he was good at his job as an MP. But you look at Ron Eldard with the long hair and kind of unkempt, and you know that this guy didn't get discharged from the military last week. Life has maybe not been going exactly the way he hoped it would upon his return." Yost said that the idea of having Ellen May be part of the Last Chance Holiness Church was conceived as the writers wanted to explore "the idea of Ellen May being at a real low point and really kind of needing to be saved. Not only is she a prostitute, but she's on and off again pretty wired into drugs. She needs saving, because we like her and we hope for her even in her small world."

The Truth family was inspired by the 2009 documentary film The Wild and Wonderful Whites of West Virginia. Mother Truth's name was conceived by writer Leonard Chang, who wrote "Mother" followed by the word "Truth", which impressed Yost. The scene where Boyd and Ava are visited by the church choir was inspired by The Wild Bunch, where they share the same song "Shall We Gather at the River?".

=== Casting ===
Despite being credited, Erica Tazel does not appear in the episode as her respective character.

=== Filming ===
Due to director Michael Dinner's unavailability but wanting to direct the first episode, this episode was the first episode filmed for the season.

== Reception ==
=== Viewers ===
In its original American broadcast, "Where's Waldo?" was seen by an estimated 2.45 million household viewers and gained a 0.9 ratings share among adults aged 18–49, according to Nielsen Media Research. This means that 0.9 percent of all households with televisions watched the episode. This was a 32% decrease in viewership from the previous episode, which was watched by 3.59 million viewers with a 1.3 in the 18-49 demographics.

=== Critical reviews ===
"Where's Waldo?" received universal acclaim from critics. Seth Amitin of IGN gave the episode an "amazing" 9.5 out of 10 and wrote, "If they can bring in characters and knead them into the plot this easily, I think we're in for Justified's best season yet. The Waldo Truth plot is interesting. The characters are moving. The actors are delivering. The whole show is a roiling powder keg. Who's in?"

Scott Tobias of The A.V. Club gave the episode an "A" grade and wrote, "But what most impressed me about the scenes with Randall The Amateur Fighter are where they take place: in a nice neighborhood, with swimming pools and big new houses. Justified loves its shacks and small towns. But this lush suburbia is also Kentucky." Kevin Fitzpatrick of Screen Crush wrote, "Justified's fourth season seems to be spinning a number of plates at the moment, and we'll be interested to see if the 'Waldo Truth' mystery has any intersection with the mysterious Last Chance Holiness Church. Both are engaging enough stories in their own right, but don't seem to feed into one another as much as we might hope."

Alan Sepinwall of HitFix wrote, "A snappy, entertaining hour, and we're only getting warmed up on the season." Rachel Larimore of Slate wrote, "Justified's winding mythology is such that I'm not inclined to rule out any unsavory connections coming out in the episodes ahead. I'll never get tired of Wynn — how many characters on TV can make a bullet to the head almost feel like a sight gag?"

Mandl Blerly of Entertainment Weekly wrote, "If this episode taught me anything, it's that I would watch Justified even if it was just Raylan, Tim, and Art on one stakeout after another. Bonus points if an episode involves Raylan having sex, which this one did." Joe Reid of Vulture gave the episode a 4 star rating out of 5 and wrote, "As we move confidently into the season-four story lines in this episode, we see a whole lot of people trying to hold on to what they've got, despite the intrusion of outsiders."

Dan Forcella of TV Fanatic gave the episode a 4.5 star rating out of 5 and wrote, "One of the great things about Justified is how often so many things are going on... yet it never feels like too much is going on. In 'Where's Waldo?' our two conflicting protagonists were being pulled in a number of directions, both of which put Raylan and Boyd in some difficult situations early on in the season, but allowed the viewers to watch their struggles with joy." Jack McKinney of Paste gave the episode a 9 out of 10 rating and wrote, "We've had two really strong episodes so far and it's hard for me to nitpick, but the one thing I will say is that I feel like there's a real feeling of outward expansion as far as the core group of characters goes."
