= Brooklynn Prince =

American child actress

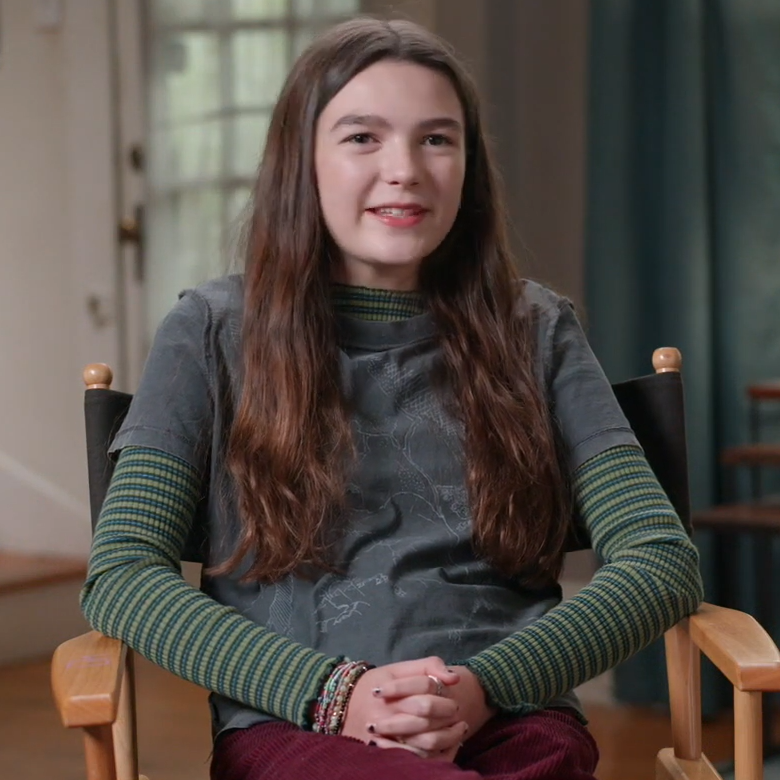
- Prince in 2024
- Born: May 4, 2010 (age 16)
- Occupations: Actress, filmmaker
- Years active: 2015–present

Brooklynn Kimberly Prince (born May 4, 2010) is an American actress and filmmaker known for her roles as Moonee in the drama film The Florida Project (2017) and Hilde Lisko in the Apple TV+ series Home Before Dark (2020–2021).

Prince made her directorial debut in 2019 with the short film Colours. In 2025, she wrote, produced, and directed the student short film Happy Thanksgiving. The film is a dark comedy and satire centered on a family gathering that escalates into a murder investigation following a dispute over orange juice. Happy Thanksgiving was featured as an official selection at the 2025 Orlando Independent Film Festival (OIFF) and the All American High School Film Festival. For her work on the film, Prince received the Audience Choice Award at the All American High School Film Festival and was recognized as the "Best Young Female Filmmaker" at the Indie Short Fest in January 2026.

Prince also appeared in The Lego Movie 2: The Second Part, The Angry Birds Movie 2 (both 2019), The Turning (2020), and Cocaine Bear (2023).

== Career ==
Prince's parents, including her acting coach mother, began her career at age two, as she appeared in print and screen advertisements for Parenting, Chuck E. Cheese's, and Visit Orlando, among others.

In 2017, she starred in The Florida Project, for which she received critical praise. Director Sean Baker has said that Brooklynn was the Spanky in his take on the Little Rascals. She has since taken leading roles in The Lego Movie 2: The Second Part and The Angry Birds Movie 2.

In 2020, Prince starred in the horror film The Turning. She headlined the Apple TV+ series Home Before Dark, which is inspired by the life of Hilde Lysiak, a nine-year-old journalist. She also starred in the Disney+ movie The One and Only Ivan, voicing Ruby the elephant.

In 2023, Prince published a comic book she co-wrote with Aliz Fernandez entitled Misfortune's Eyes.

== Filmography ==
Film and television roles
Year	Title	Role	Director	Writer	Notes
2017	Robo-Dog: Airborne	Mira Perry			
2017	The Florida Project	Moonee			
2018	Monsters at Large	Sophie			
2019	The Lego Movie 2: The Second Part	Bianca			
2019	The Angry Birds Movie 2	Zoe			Voice role
2019	Colours	Natalie	Yes	Yes	Directorial debut; short film written and directed with mentorship from Sean Baker.
2020	The Turning	Flora Fairchild			
2020	The One and Only Ivan	Ruby			Voice role
2020–2021	Home Before Dark	Hilde Lisko			Television series; main role
2021	Settlers	Younger Remmy			
2023	Cocaine Bear	Dee Dee			
2023	The Marsh King's Daughter	Young Helena			
2024	Little Wing	Kaitlyn			
2025	Happy Thanksgiving	—N/a	Yes	Yes	Student short film; won the Audience Choice Award at the 2025 All American High School Film Festival.
2026	California Scenario	Phoebe Acker			
TBA	Akari		Yes	Yes	Short film

== Awards and nominations ==
Year	Work	Award	Category	Result	Ref
2017	The Florida Project	Chicago Film Critics Association	Most Promising Performer	Nominated	
2017	The Florida Project	Dublin Film Critics' Circle	Breakthrough Artist of the Year	Nominated	
2017	The Florida Project	Gotham Independent Film Award	Breakthrough Actor	Nominated	
2017	The Florida Project	Los Angeles Online Film Critics Society	Best Performance by an Actor or Actress 23 and Under	Nominated	
2017	The Florida Project	Online Film Critics Society	Breakout Star	Nominated	
2017	The Florida Project	San Diego Film Critics Society	Breakthrough Artist	Nominated	
2017	The Florida Project	Seattle Film Critics Society	Best Youth Performance	Won	
2017	The Florida Project	Washington D.C. Area Film Critics Association	Best Youth Performance	Won	
2017	The Florida Project	Women Film Critics Circle	Best Young Actress	Won	
2018	The Florida Project	Alliance of Women Film Journalists	Best Breakthrough Performance	Won	
2018	The Florida Project	Austin Film Critics Association	Bobby McCurdy Memorial Breakthrough Artist Award	Nominated	
2018	The Florida Project	Chlotrudis Awards	Best Actress	Nominated	
2018	The Florida Project	Critics' Choice Movie Awards	Best Young Actor/Actress	Won	
2018	The Florida Project	Georgia Film Critics Association	Breakthrough Award	Nominated	
2018	The Florida Project	Houston Film Critics Society	Best Actress	Nominated	
2018	The Florida Project	Young Artist Award	Best Performance by a Leading Young Actress in a Feature Film	Nominated	
2020	Herself	Hollywood Critics Association	Next Generation of Hollywood	Won	
2025	Happy Thanksgiving	All American High School Film Festival	Audience Choice Award	Won	
2025	Happy Thanksgiving	Indie Short Fest	Best Young Female Filmmaker	Won	
