= California Scenario =

- Festival poster
- Directed by: James Takata
- Written by: Dara Resnik; James Takata
- Produced by: Jhennifer Webberley; Jen Prince; Dara Resnik; Jon Huertas; Jennie Yamaki; Chloe Durkin; Carter Smith
- Starring: Will Yun Lee; Abby Miller; Jon Huertas; Brooklynn Prince; Minnie Mills; Jes Macallan; James Saito; Jean Yoon; Ellen Greene
- Cinematography: Yasu Tanida
- Edited by: Jen Prince; Jhennifer Webberley
- Music by: Sidney Manansala
- Production company: Metamorfic Productions
- Release date: February 7, 2026 (Santa Barbara International Film Festival)
- Running time: 99 minutes
- Country: United States
- Language: English

California Scenario is a 2026 American independent drama film directed by James Takata and co-written by Dara Resnik.

== Premise ==
Divorced single parents Jacob Hara and Laura Acker search for truth in their diverse family narratives, and at Isamu Noguchi's timeless sculpture garden, find each other.

== Cast ==
- Will Yun Lee as Jacob Hara
- Abby Miller as Laura Acker
- Jon Huertas
- Brooklynn Prince as Phoebe
- Minnie Mills as Lexi
- Jes Macallan as Kelly
- James Saito as Bill
- Jean Yoon as Nancy
- Ellen Greene as Renee
- Emmylou Diaz as Anna
- Jack Stuart as Jack
- Zhaleh as Stephanie
- Dove Meir as Michael
- Reema Zaman

== Production ==
In February 2025, principal photography wrapped at the Isamu Noguchi's garden in Costa Mesa, California, with Yasu Tanida serving as the cinematographer, which marked this project as the first and only film to be shot at that location. James Takata directed and co-wrote an independent drama film with Dara Resnik, with Will Yun Lee, Abby Miller, Jon Huertas, Brooklynn Prince, Minnie Mills, Jes Macallan, James Saito, Jean Yoon, Ellen Greene, Emmylou Diaz, Jack Stuart, Zhaleh, Dove Meir, and Reema Zaman rounding out the cast. In February 2026, the film was revealed as a line-up for the Santa Barbara International Film Festival.

== Release ==
California Scenario premiered at the 41st Santa Barbara International Film Festival on February 7, 2026.
