= William Mesnik =

American actor, musician and playwright (born 1953

William Mesnik (born May 21, 1953) is an American character actor, musician and playwright who appeared in numerous films and television series of the 1990s and 2000s.

He started his career as a singer-songwriter in the mid-1970s, playing in such Greenwich Village coffee houses as Paul Colby's The Other End.

He honed his playwriting skills as a regular contributor to The West Bank Downstairs Theater Bar repertory during the 1980s, then went on to create several genre-bending musical theater pieces, including his music-drama about folk singers during the blacklist Three Songs (Fremont Centre Theatre, 1997, revived in 2002), garnering "Critic's Choice" in the Los Angeles Times and a "Best Ensemble" nomination (LA Weekly Theater Awards).

In 2000, he released an album, Campaign Songs, as an accompaniment to his drama Muckrakers: an evening of presidential campaign songs and family dysfunction, which debuted at FCT on the eve of the 2000 United States presidential election.

A graduate of the Yale School of Drama, Mesnik's theatrical resume encompasses the Broadway theatre (La Bute; Oh! Calcutta!), Off-Broadway theatre (Modigliani; A Weekend Near Madison; Smoke on the Mountain; The Good Times Are Killing Me; The Rimers of Eldritch – and others), major regional venues, including Yale Rep, The Old Globe, McCarter Theatre, The Kennedy Center, and Actors Theater of Louisville, and European-American collaborative productions of Shakespeare's King Lear and Chekhov’s Ivanov (Moscow Art Theatre). In 2002, he was nominated for an Ovation Award for his role as Holofernes in Shakespeare's Love's Labour's Lost, produced by A Noise Within.

He became a familiar face in the 1990s and 2000s from his numerous commercial, episodic television and film appearances, including: L.A. Law, Law & Order, Lois and Clark, Murphy Brown, That '70s Show, Spin City, 3rd Rock from the Sun, Dharma & Greg, Curb Your Enthusiasm (Season 1, Episode 9), Minority Report, Titanic, Stonebrooke, and two films by John Schlesinger: The Next Best Thing and Eye for an Eye.

== Filmography ==
Year	Title	Role	Notes
1995	Batman Forever	Bald Guy	
1996	Eye for an Eye	Albert Gratz	
1999	Stonebrook	Oliver Franklin	
2000	The Next Best Thing	Ashby	
2002	Minority Report	Cyber Parlor Customer	
2004	In the Land of Milk and Money	Mr. Gordon	

He also appeared in Titanic's deleted scene portrayed as man in the freezing water.
