= This Bird Has Flown =

This Bird Has Flown may refer to:

- "Norwegian Wood (This Bird Has Flown)", a 1965 song by The Beatles
- This Bird Has Flown, a 2005 Beatles tribute album
- "This Bird Has Flown" (Justified), a 2013 episode of the TV series Justified
- "This Bird Has Flown", a season 1 episode of The Casagrandes
- "This Bird Has Flown", a novel by Susanna Hoffs
