= Home Before Dark (TV series) =

2020 American mystery drama streaming series

- Genre: Mystery; Teen drama
- Created by: Dana Fox; Dara Resnik
- Inspired by: The reporting of young investigative journalist Hilde Lysiak
- Starring: Brooklynn Prince; Jim Sturgess; Abby Miller; Louis Herthum; Michael Weston; Kylie Rogers; Aziza Scott; Adrian Hough; Kiefer O'Reilly; Joelle Carter; Jibrail Nantambu; Deric McCabe; Rio Mangini
- Country of origin: United States
- Original language: English
- No. of seasons: 2
- No. of episodes: 20

Production
- Executive producers: Dana Fox; Dara Resnik; Joy Gorman Wettels; Sharlene Martin; Jon M. Chu
- Running time: 41–57 minutes
- Production companies: Electric Somewhere Co.; Foxy, Inc.; Little Bear Ink (season 1 only); Anonymous Content; Paramount Television Studios

Original release
- Network: Apple TV
- Release: April 3, 2020 – August 13, 2021

Home Before Dark is an American mystery drama television series created by Dana Fox and Dara Resnik and produced for Apple TV. The series is inspired by the life of young journalist Hilde Lysiak and stars Brooklynn Prince, Jim Sturgess, Abby Miller, Louis Herthum, Michael Weston, Kiefer O'Reilly, Kylie Rogers, Aziza Scott, Adrian Hough, Joelle Carter, Jibrail Nantambu, and Deric McCabe. It premiered on April 3, 2020. The second season premiered on June 11, 2021.

== Premise ==
Home Before Dark follows "a young girl who moves from Brooklyn to the small coastal town her father left behind. While there, her dogged pursuit of the truth leads her to unearth a cold case that everyone in town, including her own father, tried hard to bury."

== Cast ==
=== Main ===
- Brooklynn Prince as Hilde Lisko
- Jim Sturgess as Matthew Lisko
- Abby Miller as Bridget Jensen
- Louis Herthum as Frank Briggs Sr. (season 1; guest season 2)
- Michael Weston as Frank Briggs Jr.
- Kylie Rogers as Izzy Lisko
- Aziza Scott as Mackenzie "Trip" Johnson
- Adrian Hough as Jack Fife (season 1; guest season 2)
- Joelle Carter as Kim Collins
- Jibrail Nantambu as Donny Davis
- Deric McCabe as Wesley "Spoon" Witherspoon
- Rio Mangini as Ethan (season 2; recurring season 1)

=== Recurring ===
- Reed Birney as Sylvester Lisko
- Mila Morgan as Ginny Lisko
- Kiefer O'Reilly as Richie Fife
- Nicholas Holmes as Young Frank
- Dean Petriw as Young Matt
- Whitney Peak as Alpha Jessica
- Michael Greyeyes as Sam Gillis
- Sarah Giles as Beta Jessica
- Aubrey Arnason as Lucy Fife
- Malcolm Sparrow-Crawford as Young Sam Gillis
- James Sanders as Mr. Sipple
- Laiken Laverock as Young Kim
- Sharon Lawrence as Carol Collins (season 1)
- Serge Houde as Roger Collins (season 1)
- Mark Gibbon as Karl Kurz (season 2)
- Scott Lawrence as Mackenzie Johnson Jr. (season 2)
- Alexa Mansour as Emma (season 2)
- Damon Runyan as Paul Rutherford (season 2)

== Episodes ==
Season	Episodes	Originally released	
Season	Episodes	First released	Last released
1	10	April 3, 2020	
2	10	June 11, 2021	August 13, 2021

=== Season 1 (2020) ===
No. overall	No. in season	Title	Directed by	Written by	Original release date
1	1	"Magic Hour"	Jon M. Chu	Dana Fox & Dara Resnik	April 3, 2020
2	2	"Never Be the Same"	Jon M. Chu	Garrett Lerner	April 3, 2020
3	3	"Sting Like a Bee"	Rosemary Rodriguez	Ann Cherkis	April 3, 2020
4	4	"The Bird, Man"	Rosemary Rodriguez	Carla Ching	April 3, 2020
5	5	"The Green Bike"	Kat Candler	Joe Hortua	April 3, 2020
6	6	"88 Miles an Hour"	Kat Candler	Lucas O'Connor	April 3, 2020
7	7	"Search Party"	Jim McKay	Thembi L. Banks	April 3, 2020
8	8	"The Future Is Female"	Jim McKay	Hillary Cunin	April 3, 2020
9	9	"Superhero Monster Slayer"	Kate Woods	Dara Resnik & Dana Fox	April 3, 2020
10	10	"Bigger Than All of Us"	Rosemary Rodriguez	Russel Friend	April 3, 2020

=== Season 2 (2021) ===
No. overall	No. in season	Title	Directed by	Written by	Original release date
11	1	"Not Giving Up"	Kat Candler	Dana Fox & Dara Resnik	June 11, 2021
12	2	"I Believe You"	Howard Deutch	Russel Friend & Hillary Cunin	June 18, 2021
13	3	"Fighting His Ghost"	David Katzenberg	Garrett Lerner & Chloe Durkin	June 25, 2021
14	4	"Dark Rooms"	Kate Woods	Christine Roum & Russel Friend & Garrett Lerner	July 2, 2021
15	5	"The Black Box"	Myron Kerstein	Russel Friend & Krystle Drew	July 9, 2021
16	6	"What's Out There"	Edward Ornelas	Molly Nussbaum	July 16, 2021
17	7	"Just a Bird"	Karen Moncrieff	Joe Hortua	July 23, 2021
18	8	"The Bad Guy"	Edward Ornelas	Molly Nussbaum & Adam Starks	July 30, 2021
19	9	"The Biggest Life"	Howard Deutch	Joe Hortua	August 6, 2021
20	10	"The Smoking Gun"	Norma Bailey	Dana Fox & Chloe Durkin	August 13, 2021

== Production ==
=== Development ===
On August 25, 2016, it was reported that Paramount Television Studios and Anonymous Content had optioned the screen rights to Hilde and Matthew Lysiak's forthcoming book series, Hilde Cracks the Case. The deal also reportedly include Hilde's life rights as well. Paramount Television Studios was expected to act as lead production company, and Joy Gorman Wettels and Sharlene Martin were set to serve as executive producers.

On June 13, 2018, it was announced that Apple had given the untitled production a series order for a first season consisting of ten episodes. The series was created by Dana Fox and Dara Resnik, both of whom are set to executive produce alongside Wettels, Martin, and Jon M. Chu. Production companies involved with the series were set to include Anonymous Content and Paramount Television Studios.

=== Casting ===
On August 17, 2018, it was announced that Brooklynn Prince had been cast in the series' lead role. On October 23, 2018, it was reported that Jim Sturgess had been cast in a starring role. In November 2018, it was announced that Abby Miller, Louis Herthum, Michael Weston, Kylie Rogers, Aziza Scott, Adrian Hough, Joelle Carter, Jibrail Nantambu, and Deric McCabe had joined the cast in series regular roles.

=== Filming ===
Principal photography for the first season was scheduled to take place from November 12, 2018, to April 15, 2019, in Vancouver, British Columbia, Canada.

Apple renewed the series for a second season before the first season had aired, which Dana Fox called "an enormous vote of confidence". Filming for the second season was set to take place in Vancouver from January 27 to June 17, 2020. Production of the second season was shut down on March 13, due to the COVID-19 pandemic, during filming of the fourth episode. Production on the season resumed on September 14, 2020, and concluded on January 28, 2021.

Initially untitled, the series was known as Magic Hour before being renamed Home Before Dark. "Magic Hour" became the title of the pilot episode.

Cinematographer Alice Brooks shot the series with Panavision Millennium DXL2 digital cameras and customized Panavision G-Series anamorphic lenses.

== Reception ==
On Rotten Tomatoes, the series has an approval rating of 81% based on 31 reviews, with an average rating of 6.21/10. The website's critical consensus is, "Home Before Dark's central mystery is more intriguing than its mawkish writing lets on, but Brooklyn Prince's fiercely dedicated performance more than makes up for any narrative shortcomings." On Metacritic, it has a weighted average score of 64 out of 100, based on 12 critics, indicating "generally favorable" reviews.
