= Eye for an Eye (1996 film) =

- Theatrical release poster
- Directed by: John Schlesinger
- Screenplay by: Amanda Silver; Rick Jaffa
- Based on: Eye for an Eye by Erika Holzer
- Produced by: Michael I. Levy
- Starring: Sally Field; Kiefer Sutherland; Ed Harris; Beverly D'Angelo; Joe Mantegna
- Cinematography: Amir M. Mokri
- Edited by: Peter Honess
- Music by: James Newton Howard
- Production company: Paramount Pictures
- Distributed by: Paramount Pictures
- Release date: January 12, 1996
- Running time: 101 minutes
- Country: United States
- Language: English
- Budget: $20 million
- Box office: $26.9 million

Eye for an Eye is a 1996 American psychological thriller film, directed by John Schlesinger and written by Rick Jaffa and Amanda Silver, adapted from Erika Holzer's novel of the same name. It stars Sally Field, Kiefer Sutherland, Ed Harris, Beverly D'Angelo, and Joe Mantegna. Released by Paramount Pictures on January 12, 1996, the film received mostly negative reviews from critics and grossed $26.9 million against a $20 million budget.

== Plot ==
Karen and Mack McCann are happily married with two daughters, seventeen-year-old Julie (from Karen's previous marriage) and six-year-old Megan. One afternoon while Karen is out shopping, Julie is violently raped and murdered after answering the door to a stranger, which Karen overhears on the phone. Detective Joe Denillo assures the McCanns there is enough DNA evidence to find and convict the killer, and encourages Karen to seek counselling.

At a grief support group, Karen meets Albert and Regina Gratz, and Sidney Hughes. Karen overhears Albert telling Sidney something that alarms Regina. Meanwhile, DNA tests reveal Julie's killer to be Robert Doob, a delivery driver with a criminal record. However, at a pre-trial hearing, the judge dismisses the case because the defense failed to receive a DNA sample for testing. Karen and Mack are distraught as Doob walks free.

While Mack wants to resume a normal life, Karen becomes increasingly obsessed with Doob. She tails him around town, learns where he lives and monitoring his activity while he goes out on deliveries. She attempts to warn one of his regular customers, a young Spanish woman, but she does not speak English. Karen later learns that the Gratzes' son's murderer was killed in a drive-by shooting just days after being released from prison. Angel, a support group member whose young son was murdered, advises Karen to emotionally heal by focusing on having good experiences with her surviving daughter.

When Doob discovers Karen is stalking him, he appears at Megan's school when Karen is picking her up. He threatens to harm Megan if Karen continues following him. Worried for Megan's safety, and with her sanity declining, Karen approaches Sidney, who admits to arranging the drive-by shooting. He agrees to help plan a hit on Doob but insists she carry it out. Karen agrees and also joins a self-defense class, which increases her confidence, helps rekindle her marriage, and improves her relationship with Megan. However, after Sidney gives Karen a revolver, she discovers that Angel's son is actually alive and that she is an undercover FBI agent investigating vigilante activity within the support group. Angel warns her against carrying out the hit; Karen then calls Sidney to withdraw her involvement.

Soon after, Doob is arrested for murdering the woman Karen had tried to warn. To Karen's outrage, he is freed yet again due to a lack of admissible evidence; Karen decides to take matters into her own hands. While Mack plans a family vacation, Karen fabricates a work emergency to stay behind, telling him and Megan to go on ahead of her. She sneaks into and trashes Doob's apartment while he is away, knowing he will realize she was responsible. That evening, Doob breaks into Karen's home. She confronts him with the revolver Sidney provided her. Doob declares that he has no personal reason for killing her daughter, simply stating it felt good to do so. Doob rushes at Karen and, as the two struggle, Karen falls down the stairs. Doob prepares to kill her while again declaring that it is not personal. To his shock, Karen reveals she has recovered the dropped revolver, and she shoots a stunned Doob multiple times, killing him.

When the police arrive, Denillo tells Karen that he knows what she did, but unable to prove Doob's killing was premeditated, he tells his colleague that Karen acted in self-defense. At the same time, Mack returns home with Megan, having realized Karen's plan, and sees the police removing Doob's corpse. Mack quietly comforts Karen, understanding what she has done.

== Cast ==
- Sally Field as Karen McCann
- Kiefer Sutherland as Robert Doob
- Ed Harris as Mack McCann, Karen's husband
- Joe Mantegna as Detective Joe Denillo
- Beverly D'Angelo as Dolly Green
- Charlayne Woodard as FBI Agent Angel Kosinsky
- Olivia Burnette as Julie McCann, Karen teenage daughter from her previous marriage
- Alexandra Kyle as Megan McCann, Karen and Mack's daughter
- Keith David as Martin
- Philip Baker Hall as Sidney Hughes
- Natalia Nogulich as Susan Juke
- Armin Shimerman as Judge Arthur Younger
- Nicholas Cascone as District Attorney Howard Bolinger
- Darrell Larson as Peter Green
- William Mesnik as Albert Gratz
- Rondi Reed as Regina Gratz
- Donal Logue as Tony
- Grand L. Bush as Tyrone
- Ross Bagley as Sean Kosinsky
- Cynthia Rothrock as Tina
- Stella Garcia as Maria

== Critical reception ==
On Rotten Tomatoes, the film holds a score of 7% with an average rating of 3.6/10, based on 41 reviews. The site's consensus states: "Overwrought, thinly written, and all-around unpleasant, Eye for an Eye crudely exploits every parent's nightmare with deeply offensive results." On Metacritic, the film holds a rating of 25/100 based on reviews from 23 critics, indicating "generally unfavorable" reviews. Audiences polled by CinemaScore gave the film an average grade of "A−" on an A+ to F scale.

Roger Ebert gave the film one star (out of four), calling it "a particularly nasty little example of audience manipulation" and writing that it "is intellectually corrupt because it deliberately avoids dealing with the issues it raises." Ebert also compared the film to Dead Man Walking, writing that it "challenges us to deal with a wide range of ethical and moral issues. Eye for an Eye cynically blinkers us, excluding morality as much as it can, to service an exploitation plot." Janet Maslin of The New York Times wrote: "Never in his varied career has Mr. Schlesinger made a film as mean-spirited and empty as this." She also felt "The sole purpose of Eye for an Eye is to excite blood lust from the audience".

== See also ==
- List of films featuring home invasions
- Vigilante film
