= Hilde Lysiak =

American journalist (born 2006)

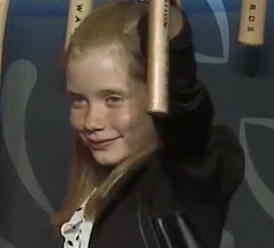
- Lysiak in 2016
- Born: Hilde Kate Lysiak; November 2, 2006 (age 19); New York City, U.S.
- Occupation: Journalist
- Years active: 2014–present
- Website: https://orangestreetnews.com

Hilde Kate Lysiak (/ˈliːʃæk/ LEE-shak; born November 2, 2006) is an American journalist who published the Orange Street News, a local newspaper, in Selinsgrove, Pennsylvania from 2014 to 2019 and in Patagonia, Arizona from 2019 to 2020. She is the youngest member of the Society of Professional Journalists. She has a book series with Scholastic and a TV mystery series inspired by her life, titled Home Before Dark, premiered on Apple TV+ in April 2020, with Brooklynn Prince playing Lysiak. Lysiak was awarded a Junior Zenger Award for Press Freedom in 2019, given to a journalist who fights for freedom of the press and the people's right to know.

== Early life ==
Lysiak was born in Brooklyn, New York, to Matthew and Bridget Lysiak. She has three sisters. Her father worked as a journalist for the New York Daily News until moving back to his hometown of Selinsgrove; he used to take Hilde to the newsroom while researching stories, and in his words "hooked her on the rush of chasing news". Her father told Today Show host Sheinelle Jones "[S]he loves it ... I don't really want to get in the way of her passion." In an interview for Brit+Co, Lysiak stated that her "favorite beat is crime. My second favorite beat is crime. And my third favorite beat is crime! Covering crime is like solving a giant moving puzzle. The job of a crime reporter might be the best job in the world." She told the Columbia Journalism Review in 2015 that rather than working for a newspaper, she ultimately wants to own her own. Lysiak strongly defends the right for children to have a voice, saying, "Kids should know that if they work hard, they can do amazing things."

In 2019, Lysiak and her family moved cross-country from Selinsgrove, Pennsylvania to Patagonia, Arizona.

== Orange Street News ==
Lysiak founded the Orange Street News in 2014 with her father's assistance. The paper's tagline was The ONLY Newspaper Devoted to Selinsgrove. Its first news item was an exclusive story announcing the birth of Lysiak's baby sister, Juliet. Initially a family newspaper written in crayon, it grew to include a Facebook page, a website, a YouTube channel, and print subscriptions with postal delivery.

Lysiak is assisted by her older sister Izzy, who edits articles, posts videos and wrote a kids' column for a local newspaper, The Daily Item. Her father talks with Lysiak about her stories and occasionally helps tighten up a lede, but mostly leaves her in command so that it remains "a kid's paper".

On April 2, 2016, Lysiak was at the police station asking the police about the conclusion of a vandalism case she was following, when she overheard the police chief explain he was leaving the station because something important had occurred. Lysiak quickly discovered that the call was for a murder only a few blocks away from her home: a woman had died violently, and the police suspected her husband had murdered her with a hammer. Lysiak went to the crime scene and then hurried home to give her father a report, which he edited and posted on the website with the headline "EXCLUSIVE: MURDER ON NINTH STREET". She returned to the murder scene and created a short video. Her story included quotes from neighbors and police. She scooped other news sources by several hours.

Lysiak was mentioned in the January 2017 issue of National Geographic article "I Am Nine Years Old". In his book LikeWar, Peter Singer uses Lysiak as one of two examples to illustrate the "shift" in journalism "eliminating gatekeepers" in favor of everyone telling their story.

== Defense of crime reporting ==
Immediately after Lysiak reported on the local murder, her newspaper's Facebook page received negative comments about a 9-year-old covering such a scene. Commenters challenged her parents' choices to allow a child to "pretend to be a reporter"; some wrote that she should be playing with a tea set or with dolls. Lysiak responded that she normally does not read the comments, but felt that she should respond to the negativity from her readers. She read out several of the comments on video to her sister, and then they posted the video on their website and on YouTube.

I don't think people should be able to decide for me who I should be and what I should be doing. I never began my newspaper so that people would think I was cute. I started the Orange Street News to give people the information they need to know... I want to be taken seriously. I'm sure other kids do, too.

If you want me to stop covering news, then you get off your computers and do something about the news. There, is that cute enough for you?

== Threatened with arrest ==
In February 2019, Lysiak was in Patagonia, Arizona, researching stories including residents' opinions on the Border Patrol and the proposed Border Wall, when she was stopped by the town marshal, Joseph A. Patterson, who asked "You taping me?" and then falsely claimed "if you put my face on the Internet, it's against the law in Arizona." He also told Lysiak, "I don't want to hear any of that freedom of press stuff."

She posted the video on YouTube and on her newspaper's website, noting that this is permitted under the First Amendment. The town disciplined the marshal, who later resigned because of the derisive international attention.

== Awards and honors ==
In 2016, Lysiak and her sister Izzy received a Tribeca Disruptive Innovations Award.

Lysiak interviewed Nobel Peace Prize recipient Malala Yousafzai during a visit to Providence, Rhode Island. Lysiak donated all the advertising revenue from the Orange Street News for a month to the Malala Fund which promotes female education.

On September 20, 2019, Lysiak was awarded a Junior Zenger Award for Press Freedom. In her acceptance speech, Lysiak spoke about the need for reporters to stay focused on the truth.

== Commencement speech ==
On May 10, 2019, Lysiak (aged 12 years, 6 months, 8 days) became possibly the youngest person in U.S. history to deliver a college commencement speech when she outlined her vision for the future of journalism for the graduating class at West Virginia University's Reed College of Media. The speech was called "one of the year's most inspirational commencement speeches." In the 13-minute speech, which was covered nationally, Lysiak confronted the current generation of journalists.

== Books ==
In June 2016, Lysiak signed a deal with Scholastic to co-write a series of four books with her father under the title Hilde Cracks the Case. The main characters are based on Lysiak and her sister and photographer, Izzy, with fictionalized versions of real stories that Lysiak has written. A series of six books was published between 2017 and 2019. Lysiak's memoir, Hilde on the Record, was published in April 2022.

== Television series ==
Paramount Television and Anonymous Content also developed a television show based on the books and optioned Lysiak's life story. Apple announced in 2018 that they would be producing the series titled Home Before Dark, with Brooklynn Prince in the lead role of Lysiak. Home Before Dark premiered on Apple TV+ on April 3, 2020.

== Personal life ==
In March 2016, Lysiak began a GoFundMe site to raise $40,000 for her borough in Selinsgrove to hire an additional police officer in response to increasing vandalism. She attended the borough council meeting and addressed the council members. On April 5, 2016, the Orange Street News reported that a new police officer had been hired for the borough.
