= Alexandra Kyle =

American actress

- Years active: 1996–present
- Children: 1

Alexandra Kyle is an American actress.

== Career ==
Kyle appeared in 1996's Eye for an Eye starring Sally Field and Kiefer Sutherland. She co-starred again with Sutherland in 1996's A Time to Kill, which also starred Sandra Bullock, Samuel L. Jackson, Matthew McConaughey, Ashley Judd and Kevin Spacey.

She had a lead role in 1998's In Quiet Night, and made guest appearances spots on JAG, ER and The Practice.

In 2004, she had a part in Gary Winick's film 13 Going on 30 as the young Tom-Tom, the younger version of Judy Greer's character Lucy, in which she was both praised for the perfect portrait of the character and the uncanny resemblance to her older version.

She made a guest appearance on Without a Trace on CBS, which aired as the fourth episode of the fifth season in 2006.

In 2011, she landed the role of Leah, a 17-year-old runaway, on NBC's long-running soap opera Days of Our Lives and was also cast as Shelly in "DisCONNECTED", an MTV Original Movie based on the true story of Abraham K. Biggs.

She also played the minor role of Roz, a teenager who is a petty criminal on Justified.

== Filmography ==
=== Film ===
Year	Title	Role	Notes
1996	Eye for an Eye	Megan McCann	Supporting role
1996	A Time to Kill	Hannah Brigance	
1998	In Quiet Night	Dinah Wolcott	Supporting role
2004	13 Going on 30	Young Lucy "Tom-Tom" Wyman	Supporting role
2004	Funky Monkey	Katie	

=== Television ===
Year	Title	Role	Notes
1996	JAG	Young Meg	Episode: "Hemlock"
2001	The Practice	Amanda McGowan	Recurring role (season 5); 4 episodes
2002	ER	Marlene	Episode: "Walk Like a Man"
2006-2007	Without a Trace	Jamie Asher	3 episodes
2011	Days of Our Lives	Leah	2 episodes
2011	A Thin Line	Shelly	TV movie
2011	DisCONNECTED	Shelly	TV movie
2013	Justified	Roz	3 episodes
2015	NCIS	Emma Vickers	Episode: No Good Deed
2016	Mary + Jane	Emily	Episode: MarijuanaCon
2017	Rosewood	Sandy Langford	Episode: Calliphoridae & Country Roads

=== Other work ===
Year	Title	Role	Notes
2014	Pretty Baby	Angel	Music video by Stephan Bishop
2019	Anxiety’s Wilma	Wilma	Short film
2019	Forevering	TBA	Short film Post-production
