= Dana Fox =

American screenwriter (born 1976)

- Born: September 18, 1976 (age 49); Brighton, New York, U.S.
- Education: Stanford University (BA); University of Southern California (MFA)
- Occupation: Screenwriter
- Spouse: Quinn Emmett (m. 2010)
- Writing career
- Notable works: What Happens in Vegas (2008); Wicked (2024)

Dana Fox (born September 18, 1976) is an American screenwriter. She is best known as the writer of the films The Wedding Date (2005), What Happens in Vegas (2008) and Wicked (2024, co-written with Winnie Holzman), and the television comedy series Ben and Kate (2012–13).

== Career ==
Fox graduated from Stanford University in 1998 with a degree in English and art history, and went on to attend the University of Southern California (USC), where she took part in the USC School of Cinematic Arts' Peter Stark Producing Program and graduated in 2000. She had originally intended to become a film producer, but when assigned a homework task at USC to write a 30-page screenplay, she found that she enjoyed writing more and decided to become a screenwriter instead. She became an assistant to writers Alfred Gough and Miles Millar while they were creating the Superman television series Smallville, and later worked for writer-director John August.

While represented by Gough and Millar's agent, established screenwriter Jessica Bendinger sought after an unpublished writer who would work inexpensively on a screenplay. Fox had not yet written a sample screenplay, but Bendinger was so impressed with her ideas for the story that Fox was hired to write the script. The produced film was The Wedding Date, which ultimately was panned by critics but a financial success. After The Wedding Date's release, she was attached to three separate writing projects. Her next produced screenplay was What Happens in Vegas, which was bought by 20th Century Fox in a high six-figure deal for the script's first draft, and which stars Cameron Diaz and Ashton Kutcher. After What Happens in Vegas was bought, Fox performed rewrites on 27 Dresses (2008) and Knight and Day (2010), and was named one of Variety magazine's "10 Screenwriters to Watch" of 2007.

In 2012, Fox developed a half hour comedy for FOX based loosely on her older brother. The show, Ben and Kate, premiered on September 25, 2012.

Fox is good friends with fellow writers Diablo Cody (Juno), Lorene Scafaria (Nick and Nora's Infinite Playlist), and Liz Meriwether (No Strings Attached) with whom she collaborates in a writing group they call the "Fempire". In 2012, Fox and the "Fempire" received the Athena Film Festival Award for Creativity and Sisterhood.

== Personal life ==
Fox was born in Brighton, New York, and lives in Los Angeles, California. Fox married Quinn Emmett on October 23, 2010 at Historic Jamestowne in Williamsburg, Virginia.

== Filmography ==
=== Film ===
Year	Title	Writer	Producer
2005	The Wedding Date	Yes	No
2008	What Happens in Vegas	Yes	No
2009	Couples Retreat	Yes	No
2015	Hot Pursuit	No	Yes
2016	How to Be Single	Yes	Yes
2019	Isn't It Romantic	Yes	No
2021	Cruella	Yes	No
2022	The Lost City	Yes	Yes
2024	Wicked	Yes	Executive
2025	Wicked: For Good	Yes	Executive

Additional literary material

- Fly Me to the Moon (2024)
- Back in Action (2025)
- A Minecraft Movie (2025)

=== Television ===
Year	Title	Writer	Creator	Executive Producer	Notes
2010	Children's Hospital	Yes	No	No	Episode: "Show Me on Montana"
2012–2013	Ben and Kate	Yes	Yes	Yes	
2020–2021	Home Before Dark	Yes	Yes	Yes	
