= Abby Miller =

American actress

- Born: Abigail Miller; Clay Center, Nebraska, United States
- Occupation: Actress
- Years active: 2005–present

Abigail "Abby" Miller is an American actress best known for her recurring role as Ellen May on the FX series Justified.

She graduated from the University of Nebraska–Lincoln and studied theater in London before moving to Los Angeles to pursue an acting career.

Prior to her work on television, Miller toured throughout the western United States as one half of the folk pop band Jen & Abby. In Los Angeles, the band found a home at the Hotel Café.

== Filmography ==
Film and television roles
Year	Title	Role	Notes
2005	Gilmore Girls	Girl #1	Episode: "Women of Questionable Morals"
2006	The Girl	Jasmine	
2006–2007	The Nine	Jenine	3 episodes
2007	Veronica Mars	Blonde Female Caller	Episode: "Debasement Tapes"
2007	Cavemen	Pendleton Sister	Episode: "Andy, the Stand-Up"
2010	One Too Many Mornings	Henry	
2010	Mad Men	Dorothy	Episode: "The Rejected"
2011	Private Practice	Simone Parker	Episode: "Heaven Can Wait"
2011–2013, 2015	Justified	Ellen May	Recurring role (seasons 2–4, 6), 16 episodes
2012	Congratulations	Bridget Gardener	
2012	Fuzz Track City	Jo	
2012	The Booth at the End	Theresa	Main role (season 2)
2013	Feeding Mr. Baldwin	Katie	
2013	Film Pigs	Gore Verbinski's Assistant	Episode: " The One Year Anniversary Spectacular, Part One"
2013	It's Not You, It's Me	Tracy	
2013	Speak Now	Ella	
2014	Caper	Penny Blue	9 episodes
2014	Swelter	Peaches	
2015	Aquarius	Mary Brunner	4 episodes
2015	Grey's Anatomy	Kate Shaw	Episode: "One Flight Down"
2016	Law & Order SVU	Libby Parker	Episode: "Forty-One Witnesses"
2016	The Catch	Gwen Ericsson	Episode: "The Princess and the I.P."
2016–2017	The Magicians	Emily Greenstreet	3 episodes
2017	The Sinner	Caitlin Sulivan	Main role (season 1)
2018	Imposters	Charlotte	2 episodes
2020	Home Before Dark	Bridget Jensen	Main role
2023	Jess Plus None	Jess	
2026	California Scenario	Laura Acker	
